= 2026 West Bengal Legislative Assembly election =

Election to the 18th Legislative Assembly of the Indian state of West Bengal

- 23 and 29 April 2026 (293 seats); 21 May 2026 (1 seat)

All 294 elected seats in the West Bengal Legislative Assembly 148 seats needed for a majority
- Registered: 68,362,033
- Turnout: 93.71% (▲11.41 pp)
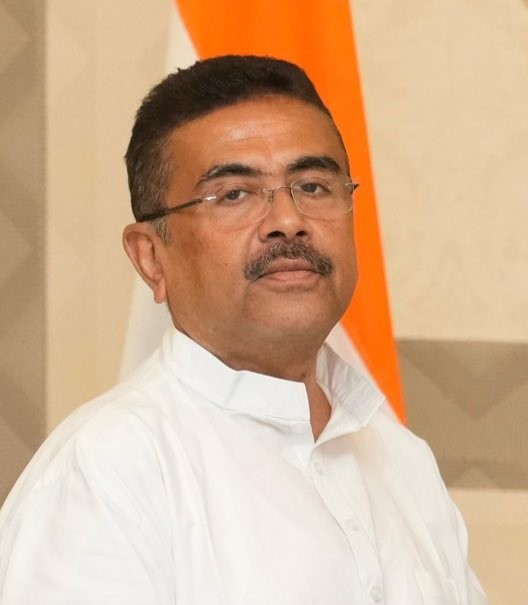

	Majority party	Minority party
Leader	Suvendu Adhikari	Mamata Banerjee
Party	BJP	AITC
Alliance	NDA	AITC+
Leader since	2021	1998
Leader's seat	Bhabanipur (won, retained); Nandigram (won, vacated)	Bhabanipur (lost)
Last election	37.97%, 77 seats	48.02%, 215 seats
Seats won	208	80
Seat change	▲131	▼135
Popular vote	29,374,470	26,021,160
Percentage	45.92%	40.68%
Swing	▲7.95 pp	▼7.34 pp

Chief Minister before election
Mamata Banerjee
AITC
Chief Minister after election
Suvendu Adhikari
BJP

The 2026 West Bengal Legislative Assembly election was the 18th quinquennial legislative assembly election held in the Indian state of West Bengal on 23 and 29 April in two phases, to elect 294 MLAs to the 18th West Bengal Legislative Assembly. The votes were counted and the result declared on Monday, 4 May. The election saw the defeat of the incumbent All India Trinamool Congress (AITC), led by Mamata Banerjee. The Bharatiya Janata Party (BJP) won the election in a landslide and formed the government for the first time in the state.

Over 9 million voters were removed through the Special Intensive Revision (SIR) prior to the elections. This move has been criticized as erosion of democracy in India. The election recorded a historic voter turnout of about 94%, surpassing even the 2011 election, highest ever for a General election for the Parliament or State Legislative Assembly in India. It was the first time since 1946 that a right-wing party has won the highest number of seats in the Bengal Legislative Assembly. The Indian National Congress and the Communist Party of India (Marxist) returned to the assembly after having no seats since the last election. The All India Secular Front also retained its sole constituency, while the newly formed Aam Janata Unnayan Party of Humayun Kabir gained two seats.

The Election Commission deployed over 350,000 security personnel in this state election, and conducted a largely violence-free election in a state with a history of political violence. There were 85,379 polling booths and about 4.5 lakh polling officers involved in the election. New booths were set up in urban areas in high rises and housing complexes due to allegations of voter intimidation in the previous election.

Many political analysts reported strong anti-incumbency against the 15-year rule of the All India Trinamool Congress, widely known as AITC. Several politicians, blamed AITC misrule, filled with corruption, political violence, and especially cases of violence against women, such as the 2024 Kolkata rape and murder at R. G. Medical college, as the main reasons for the defeat of AITC.

Initially, after the results were declared on 4 May, Mathabhanga Naxalbari had the highest winning margin. However, a full repoll for 21 May was ordered in Falta due to allegations of election malpractice. Results for Falta were declared on 24 May, and the BJP won a landslide victory with the highest margin in the state.

== Background ==
The tenure of West Bengal Legislative Assembly was scheduled to end on 7 May 2026. The previous assembly elections were held in March to April 2021. After the election, the incumbent All India Trinamool Congress (AITC) formed the state government again after winning 215 out of 294 seats in the assembly, with Mamata Banerjee sworn in as the Chief Minister.

=== Collapse of Left-Congress alliance ===
On 5 February 2026, the Communist Party of India (Marxist) chief Mohammad Salim announced that the Left Front will contest all the seats without its ally, Indian National Congress, marking the end of the Left-Congress alliance. The alliance was made in 2015 as both the opposition parties wanted to put up a joint front against AITC and prevent BJP from growing. This split occurred mainly as in 2016 they won a moderate amount of seats, but did not win, and they faced major wipeouts (~0) in 2019, 2024 Lok Sabha elections and 2021 assembly elections.

== Political issues ==
The campaign was shaped by disputes over electoral rolls and citizenship, border security and undocumented migration, and broader debates over identity, governance, women's safety, employment, development, and anti-incumbency after 15 years of AITC rule.

=== SIR and electoral rolls ===
The Special Intensive Revision (SIR) of electoral rolls became one of the central controversies of the campaign. The SIR removed around 9 million voter entries from the rolls in West Bengal, representing about 12% of the electorate. Over six million were categorized as absentee or deceased, while the status of 2.7 million remained pending before tribunals. Dalit Hindus, especially from the Matua community, were affected in certain districts. The move was criticised as "bloodless political genocide" and erosion of democracy in India.

In February 2026, the Supreme court told the Calcutta high court to appoint judicial officers for helping West Bengal in carrying out the SIR exercise. It was decided to engage 150 judges from district session courts in the exercise.

The deletion of names from the rolls and the subsequent adjudication process became major political issues during the election period. The AITC said that the exercise risked disenfranchising genuine voters, while the Bharatiya Janata Party (BJP) defended it as a revision of bogus entries and illegal migrants. The issue remained under judicial scrutiny during the campaign.

=== Citizenship Amendment Act ===
The Citizenship Amendment Act (CAA) remained a separate campaign issue, particularly in areas where refugee and Matua politics were significant. The Union government published details of the act's implementation in the Citizenship (Amendment) Rules, 2024, in March 2024, and BJP leaders said that a BJP government in West Bengal would speed up citizenship processing under the Act. The AITC argued that the issue was being used to polarise the electorate and that the overlap between CAA, SIR and citizenship rhetoric had increased anxiety among minorities and some migrant communities.

=== Border security and migration ===
Border security and undocumented migration were also major issues in the campaign. BJP leaders framed cross-border movement, border fencing and the Siliguri Corridor as matters of national security and linked them to their wider argument on infiltration. The AITC rejected these claims as politically motivated and linked them to communal polarisation.

=== Identity politics ===
Identity politics remained significant in the campaign. Bengali asmita (identity), the Matua vote, and questions of language, belonging and representation were prominent themes in several regions of the state. The AITC sought to present itself as the defender of Bengali identity and state autonomy, while the BJP tied identity questions to citizenship, migration and Hindu consolidation in selected constituencies.

=== Corruption ===
Corruption and governance remained important opposition themes, especially because of the school recruitment scam and other ongoing investigations by central agencies. These allegations formed a major opposition line of attack on the AITC government's record in administration, public recruitment and institutional credibility. The AITC, by contrast, emphasised welfare delivery, continuity and its development record.

=== Women's safety ===
Women's safety was a recurring issue in the campaign, especially after the 2024 R. G. Kar Medical College and Hospital rape and murder case, which drew national attention and remained part of the wider law and order debate. The AITC cited NCRB data showing Kolkata's comparatively low reported crime rate among large cities, while the BJP argued that such data did not capture under-reporting or failures to register cases.

=== Economy and employment ===
Employment, industrial development and public recruitment were also prominent issues, particularly among younger and urban voters. Concerns about job creation, delayed recruitment examinations, the effects of the recruitment scandal, and competing claims over investment and industrial growth featured prominently in the campaign. The BJP foregrounded jobs and industrial revival in its criticism of the state government, while the AITC campaigned on welfare schemes and promised continued investment and infrastructure expansion.

=== Anti-incumbency ===
Anti-incumbency after 15 years of AITC rule was also noted as a factor in the contest, although it overlapped with disputes over SIR, identity and citizenship. Dissatisfaction over jobs, corruption, governance and law and order was often discussed alongside these issues rather than separately.

== Schedule ==
The Election Commission of India announced the schedule for the West Bengal Legislative Assembly election on 15 March 2026.

Phases of the West Bengal Legislative Assembly election

On consideration of severe electoral offences in Falta Assembly constituency, re-polling happened on 21 May 2026, with results for the seat on 24 May 2026.

Poll event	Phases	
Poll event	I	II
Notification date	30 March 2026	2 April 2026
Last date for filing nomination	6 April 2026	9 April 2026
Scrutiny of nomination	7 April 2026	10 April 2026
Last date for withdrawal of nomination	9 April 2026	13 April 2026
Date of poll	23 April 2026	29 April 2026
Number of constituencies	152	142
Assembly Constituency numbers	AC 1–76; AC 203–258; AC 275–294	AC 77–202; AC 259–274
Date of counting of votes	4 May 2026	
Date of completion of electoral process	6 May 2026	

== Parties and alliances ==
=== Bharatiya Janata Party ===
National Democratic Alliance
Party	Flag	Symbol	State President	Leader	Seats
Bharatiya Janata Party			Samik Bhattacharya	Suvendu Adhikari	294

=== All India Trinamool Congress+ ===
Seat-sharing map of the AITC+ alliance

AITC+ Seat Sharing

Trinamool Congress+
Party	Flag	Symbol	Leader	Seats
All India Trinamool Congress			Mamata Banerjee	291
Bharatiya Gorkha Prajatantrik Morcha			Anit Thapa	3
Total				294

=== Left Front+ ===
Seat-sharing map of the Left Front+ alliance

Left Front+ Seat Sharing

Left Front+
Party	Flag	Symbol	Leader	Seats	
Communist Party of India (Marxist)			Mohammed Salim	195	197
Marxist Forward Bloc			Ashish Chakraborty	1	197
Revolutionary Communist Party of India			Subhas Roy	1	197
All India Secular Front			Nawsad Siddiqui	30	31
Social Democratic Party of India			Hakikul Islam	1	31
All India Forward Bloc			Naren Chatterjee	24	
Revolutionary Socialist Party			Tapan Hore	18	
Communist Party of India			Swapan Banerjee	17	
Communist Party of India (Marxist–Leninist) Liberation			Abhijit Majumder	10	
West Bengal Socialist Party			Manindra Chandra Paul	1	
Independent			Ajoy Edwards	1	
Total				293+6	

==== Friendly Contests ====
No.	Parties	Constituency	
No.	Parties	No.	Name
1	RSP and CPI(ML)L	69	Bharatpur
2	AISF and AIFB	118	Madhyamgram
3	AISF and RSP	128	Basanti (SC)
4	AISF and RSP	202	Khanakul
5	AISF and CPI	210	Nandigram
6	AISF and CPI(M)	294	Murarai

=== Indian National Congress ===
Party	Flag	Symbol	Leader	Seats
Indian National Congress			Subhankar Sarkar	293

=== Others ===
Party	Flag	Symbol	Leader	Seats
Socialist Unity Centre of India (Communist)		Torch Light	Chandidas Bhattacharya	230
Bahujan Samaj Party			Jay Prakash Singh	152
Aam Janata Unnayan Party			Humayun Kabir	115
All India Majlis-e-Ittehadul Muslimeen			Imran Solanki	12
Jharkhand Loktantrik Krantikari Morcha			Motilal Mahato	2

== Candidates ==
BJP released the first list of 144 candidates on 16 March 2026; the second list of 111 candidates (also included replacement of a candidate and support to an independent candidate) on 19 March 2026. The third list of BJP candidates was released on 25 March 2026 wherein 19 candidates were named. BJP released the fourth list of candidates on 31 March 2026 announcing 13 candidates and another 1 previously announced candidate was replaced. (Note: The initial candidate from BJP in Maynaguri was the incumbent MLA Kaushik Roy, however his name was replaced with that of Dalim Roy.)

AITC+ released their first list of 3 candidates on 15 March 2026, including 3 candidates for BGPM. AITC released their list of 291 candidates on 17 March 2026.

Left Front announced the first list of 192 candidates on 16 March 2026, including 142 seats for CPI(M), 21 seats for AIFB, 14 seats for CPI, 13 seats for RSP, and 1 seat each for RCPI and MFB; the second list of 32 candidates on 19 March 2026, including 28 seats for CPI(M), 3 seats for CPI and 1 seat for RSP; the third list of 15 candidates including 13 seats for CPI(M) and 2 seats for AIFB and the fourth list containing 7 candidates for CPI(M). CPI(ML)L announced the names of their candidates on 10 seats on 17 March 2026.

INC released first list of 284 candidates on 29 March 2026; INC released second list of 9 candidates on 1 April 2026.

=== List ===
Voting date	District	No.	Constituency	AITC+		NDA		LF+		UPA	
Voting date	District	No.	Constituency	Party	Candidate	Party	Candidate	Party	Candidate	Party	Candidate
23 April 2026	Cooch Behar	1	Mekliganj (SC)	AITC	Paresh Adhikary	BJP	Dadhiram Ray	AIFB	Kamal Roy	INC	Ila Rani Roy
23 April 2026	Cooch Behar	2	Mathabhanga (SC)	AITC	Sablu Barman	BJP	Nisith Pramanik	CPI(M)	Khagen Barman	INC	Khitendra Nath Barman
23 April 2026	Cooch Behar	3	Cooch Behar Uttar (SC)	AITC	Partha Pratim Roy	BJP	Sukumar Roy	CPI(M)	Pranay Karji	INC	Partha Pratim Ishore
23 April 2026	Cooch Behar	4	Cooch Behar Dakshin	AITC	Avijit Dey Bhowmik	BJP	Rathindra Bose	AIFB	Nazmul Alam Sarkar	INC	Khokan Mian
23 April 2026	Cooch Behar	5	Sitalkuchi (SC)	AITC	Harihar Das	BJP	Sabitri Barman	CPI(M)	Nabadipti Adhikari	INC	Sukamal Barman
23 April 2026	Cooch Behar	6	Sitai (SC)	AITC	Sangita Roy	BJP	Ashutosh Barma	AIFB	Arun Kumar Barma	INC	Rabin Roy
23 April 2026	Cooch Behar	7	Dinhata	AITC	Udayan Guha	BJP	Ajay Ray	AIFB	Bikash Mondal	INC	Harihar Ray Singha
23 April 2026	Cooch Behar	8	Natabari	AITC	Sailen Barman	BJP	Girija Shankar Ray	CPI(M)	Akik Hassan	INC	Biswajit Sarkar
23 April 2026	Cooch Behar	9	Tufanganj	AITC	Shib Shankar Paul	BJP	Malati Rava Roy	CPI(M)	Dhananjoy Rava	INC	Debendra Nath Barma
23 April 2026	Alipurduar	10	Kumargram (ST)	AITC	Rajeev Tirkey	BJP	Manoj Kumar Oraon	RSP	Kishore Minz	INC	Sudham Lama
23 April 2026	Alipurduar	11	Kalchini (ST)	AITC	Birendra Bara	BJP	Bishal Lama	RSP	Passang Sherpa	INC	Anjan Chik Baraik
23 April 2026	Alipurduar	12	Alipurduars	AITC	Suman Kanjilal	BJP	Paritosh Das	CPI(M)	Shyamal Roy	INC	Mrinmoy Sarkar
23 April 2026	Alipurduar	13	Falakata (SC)	AITC	Subhas Chandra Roy	BJP	Dipak Barman	CPI(M)	Kamal Kishore Roy	INC	Akshoy Kumar Barman
23 April 2026	Alipurduar	14	Madarihat (ST)	AITC	Jay Prakash Toppo	BJP	Laxuman Limbu	RSP	Subhas Lohar	INC	Joy Prafulla Lakra
23 April 2026	Jalpaiguri	15	Dhupguri (SC)	AITC	Nirmal Chandra Roy	BJP	Naresh Roy	CPI(M)	Niranjan Roy	INC	Harish Chandra Roy
23 April 2026	Jalpaiguri	16	Maynaguri (SC)	AITC	Rammohan Roy	BJP	Dalim Chandra Roy	RSP	Sudeb Roy	INC	Jogen Sarkar
23 April 2026	Jalpaiguri	17	Jalpaiguri (SC)	AITC	Krishna Das	BJP	Ananta Deb Adhikary	CPI(M)	Debraj Barman	INC	Sudipto Mohonto
23 April 2026	Jalpaiguri	18	Rajganj (SC)	AITC	Swapna Barman	BJP	Dinesh Sarkar	CPI(M)	Kharendranath Roy	INC	Tushar Kanti Roy
23 April 2026	Jalpaiguri	19	Dabgram-Phulbari	AITC	Ranjan Shil Sharma	BJP	Shikha Chatterjee	CPI(M)	Dilip Singh	INC	Rohit Singh Sisodia
23 April 2026	Jalpaiguri	20	Mal (ST)	AITC	Bulu Chik Baraik	BJP	Sukra Munda	CPI(M)	Manu Oraon	INC	Rakesh Kujur
23 April 2026	Jalpaiguri	21	Nagrakata (ST)	AITC	Sanjay Kujur	BJP	Puna Bhengra	CPI(M)	Dilkumar Oraon	INC	Shinu Munda
23 April 2026	Kalimpong	22	Kalimpong	BGPM	Ruden Sada Lepcha	BJP	Bharat Chhetri	CPI(M)	Rita Thapa	INC	Santa Kumar Pradhan
23 April 2026	Darjeeling	23	Darjeeling	BGPM	Bijoy Kumar Rai	BJP	Noman Rai	IND	Ajoy Edwards	INC	Madhap Rai
23 April 2026	Darjeeling	24	Kurseong	BGPM	Amar Lama	BJP	Sonam Lama	CPI(M)	Uttam Sharma	INC	Saroj Kumar Khatri
23 April 2026	Darjeeling	25	Matigara-Naxalbari (SC)	AITC	Shankar Malakar	BJP	Anandamoy Barman	CPI(M)	Jharen Roy	INC	Amitava Sarkar
23 April 2026	Darjeeling	26	Siliguri	AITC	Goutam Deb	BJP	Shankar Ghosh	CPI(M)	Sharadindu Chakraborty	INC	Aloke Dhara
23 April 2026	Darjeeling	27	Phansidewa (ST)	AITC	Reena Toppo Ekka	BJP	Durga Murmu	CPI(ML)L	Sumanti Ekka	INC	Nabanita Tirkey
23 April 2026	Uttar Dinajpur	28	Chopra	AITC	Hamidul Rahaman	BJP	Shankar Adhikari	CPI(M)	Makleswar Rahaman	INC	Zakir Abedin
23 April 2026	Uttar Dinajpur	29	Islampur	AITC	Kanaia Lal Agarwal	BJP	Chitrajit Roy	CPI(M)	Sami Khan	INC	Guddi Riaz
23 April 2026	Uttar Dinajpur	30	Goalpokhar	AITC	Md. Ghulam Rabbani	BJP	Sarajit Biswas	AIFB	Zamaluddin	INC	Masood Md. Naseem Ahsen
23 April 2026	Uttar Dinajpur	31	Chakulia	AITC	Minhajul Arfin Azad	BJP	Manoj Jain	AIFB	Amjad Ali	INC	Ali Imran Ramz
23 April 2026	Uttar Dinajpur	32	Karandighi	AITC	Goutam Paul	BJP	Biraj Biswas	CPI(M)	Md. Sahabuddin	INC	Murshid Alam
23 April 2026	Uttar Dinajpur	33	Hemtabad (SC)	AITC	Satyajit Barman	BJP	Haripada Barman	CPI(M)	Tanushree Das	INC	Anamika Roy
23 April 2026	Uttar Dinajpur	34	Kaliaganj (SC)	AITC	Nitai Baishya	BJP	Utpal Brahmacharo	CPI(M)	Hirubala Roy	INC	Girdhari Pramanik
23 April 2026	Uttar Dinajpur	35	Raiganj	AITC	Krishna Kalyani	BJP	Koushik Chowdhury	CPI(M)	Jibananda Singha	INC	Mohit Sengupta
23 April 2026	Uttar Dinajpur	36	Itahar	AITC	Mosaraf Hussen	BJP	Sabita Barman	CPI	Utpal Das	INC	Amal Acharjee
23 April 2026	Dakshin Dinajpur	37	Kushmandi (SC)	AITC	Rekha Roy	BJP	Tapas Chandra Roy	RSP	Jyotirmoy Roy	INC	Bablu Sarkar
23 April 2026	Dakshin Dinajpur	38	Kumarganj	AITC	Toraf Hossain Mandal	BJP	Suvendu Sarkar	CPI(M)	Mofazzal Hossain	INC	Gulam Martuja Mandal
23 April 2026	Dakshin Dinajpur	39	Balurghat	AITC	Arpita Ghosh	BJP	Bidyut Roy	RSP	Arnab Choudhury	INC	Pradip Kumar Mitra
23 April 2026	Dakshin Dinajpur	40	Tapan (ST)	AITC	Chintamoni Biha	BJP	Budhrai Tudu	RSP	Bappai Haro	INC	Bankim Chandra Toppo
23 April 2026	Dakshin Dinajpur	41	Gangarampur (SC)	AITC	Goutam Das	BJP	Satyendra Nath Ray	CPI(M)	Biplab Barman	INC	Jui Barman
23 April 2026	Dakshin Dinajpur	42	Harirampur	AITC	Biplab Mitra	BJP	Debabrata Majumder	CPI(M)	Gautam Goswami	INC	Subhasish Pal
23 April 2026	Malda	43	Habibpur (ST)	AITC	Amal Kisku	BJP	Joyel Murmu	CPI(M)	Basudeb Barman	INC	Rajen Soren
23 April 2026	Malda	44	Gazole (SC)	AITC	Prasenjit Das	BJP	Chinmoy Deb Barman	CPI(M)	Khitish Sarkar	INC	Prem Chowdhury
23 April 2026	Malda	45	Chanchal	AITC	Prasun Banerjee	BJP	Ratan Das	CPI(M)	Anawarul Haque	INC	Asif Mehbub
23 April 2026	Malda	46	Harishchandrapur	AITC	Md. Matibur Rahaman	BJP	Ratan Das	CPI(M)	Sheikh Khalil	INC	Mostaque Alam
23 April 2026	Malda	47	Malatipur	AITC	Abdur Rahim Boxi	BJP	Ashish Das	CPI(M)	Minarul Hossain	INC	Mausam Noor
23 April 2026	Malda	48	Ratua	AITC	Samar Mukherjee	BJP	Abhishek Singhania	CPI(M)	Jahur Alam	INC	Mottakin Alam
23 April 2026	Malda	49	Manikchak	AITC	Kabita Mandal	BJP	Gour Chandra Mondal	CPI(M)	Debojyoti Sinha	INC	Md. Ansarul Hoque
23 April 2026	Malda	50	Maldaha (SC)	AITC	Lipika Barman Ghosh	BJP	Gopal Chandra Saha	CPI	Dipak Barman	INC	Bhupendra Nath Halder
23 April 2026	Malda	51	English Bazar	AITC	Ashish Kundu	BJP	Amlan Bhaduri	CPI(M)	Ambar Mitra	INC	Masud Alam
23 April 2026	Malda	52	Mothabari	AITC	Md. Najrul Islam	BJP	Nibaran Ghosh	AISF	Moulana Shajahan Ali	INC	Sayem Chowdhury
23 April 2026	Malda	53	Sujapur	AITC	Sabina Yeasmin	BJP	Abhiraj Chowdhury	AISF	Md. Karimullah Haque	INC	Md. Abdul Hannan
23 April 2026	Malda	54	Baisnabnagar	AITC	Chandana Sarkar	BJP	Raju Karmakar	RSP	Dundubhi Saha	INC	Mamuni Mandal
23 April 2026	Murshidabad	55	Farakka	AITC	Amirul Islam	BJP	Sunil Chowdhury	CPI(M)	Mojaffar Hossain	INC	Md. Mahtab Sheikh
23 April 2026	Murshidabad	56	Samserganj	AITC	Nur Alam	BJP	Shashthi Charan Ghosh	Did not contest (Note: The alliance field an ISF candidate, but the nomination was rejected)		INC	Nazme Alam
23 April 2026	Murshidabad	57	Suti	AITC	Emani Biswas	BJP	Mahabir Ghosh	RSP	A.K.M. Hasanuzzaman	INC	Alfazuddin Biswas
23 April 2026	Murshidabad	58	Jangipur	AITC	Jakir Hossain	BJP	Chitta Mukherjee	CPI(M)	Alok Kumar Das	INC	Mohammad Imran Ali
23 April 2026	Murshidabad	59	Raghunathganj	AITC	Akhruzzaman	BJP	Surajit Poddar	CPI(M)	Abul Hasnat	INC	Nasir Sheikh
23 April 2026	Murshidabad	60	Sagardighi	AITC	Bayron Biswas	BJP	Tapas Chakraborty	SDPI	Masiur Rahaman	INC	Manoj Chakraborty
23 April 2026	Murshidabad	61	Lalgola	AITC	Abdul Aziz	BJP	Amar Kumar Das	CPI(M)	Babluzzaman	INC	Md. Touhidur Rahaman
23 April 2026	Murshidabad	62	Bhagabangola	AITC	Reyat Hossain Sarkar	BJP	Bhaskar Sarkar	CPI(M)	Mahmudal Hassan	INC	Anju Begum
23 April 2026	Murshidabad	63	Raninagar	AITC	Abdul Soumik Hossain	BJP	Rana Pratap Singha Roy	CPI(M)	Jamal Hossain	INC	Zulfikur Ali
23 April 2026	Murshidabad	64	Murshidabad	AITC	Shaoni Singha Roy	BJP	Gouri Shankar Ghosh	AIFB	Abdul Mannan	INC	Siddiqui Ali
23 April 2026	Murshidabad	65	Nabagram (SC)	AITC	Pranab Chandra Das	BJP	Dilip Saha	CPI(M)	Purnima Das	INC	Hiru Haldar
23 April 2026	Murshidabad	66	Khargram (SC)	AITC	Ashish Marjit	BJP	Mitali Mal	CPI(M)	Dhrubajyoti Saha	INC	Mandar Kanti Mandal
23 April 2026	Murshidabad	67	Burwan (SC)	AITC	Protima Rajak	BJP	Sukhen Kumar Bagdi	RSP	Ananda Das	INC	Sujit Das
23 April 2026	Murshidabad	68	Kandi	AITC	Apurba Sarkar	BJP	Gargi Das Ghosh	CPI	Rejaul Karim	INC	Dr. Shamim Rana
23 April 2026	Murshidabad	69	Bharatpur	AITC	Mustafizur Rahaman	BJP	Anamika Ghosh	RSP	Naofel Md Shafiullah	INC	Md. Azharudddin
23 April 2026	Murshidabad	70	Rejinagar	AITC	Ataur Rahman	BJP	Bapan Ghosh	WBSP	Tushar Kanti Chatterjee	INC	Jillu Sheikh
23 April 2026	Murshidabad	71	Beldanga	AITC	Rabiul Alam Chowdhury	BJP	Bharat Kumar Jhawar	RSP	Rajesh Ghosh	INC	Md. Saharuddin Sheikh
23 April 2026	Murshidabad	72	Baharampur	AITC	Naru Gopal Mukherjee	BJP	Subrata Maitra	CPI(ML)L	Abul Kashem Seikh	INC	Adhir Ranjan Chowdhury
23 April 2026	Murshidabad	73	Hariharpara	AITC	Niamot Sheikh	BJP	Tanmoy Biswas	CPI(M)	Zamiruddin Molla	INC	Mousumi Begum
23 April 2026	Murshidabad	74	Naoda	AITC	Sahina Mumtaz Begum	BJP	Rana Mondal	RSP	Habibur Rahaman Mondal	INC	Moshiur Rahman
23 April 2026	Murshidabad	75	Domkal	AITC	Humayun Kabir	BJP	Nanda Dulal Pal	CPI(M)	Mostafizur Rahaman	INC	Shehnaz Begum
23 April 2026	Murshidabad	76	Jalangi	AITC	Babar Ali	BJP	Naba Kumar Sarkar	CPI(M)	Yunus Ali Sarkar	INC	Abdul Rezzak Molla
29 April 2026	Nadia	77	Karimpur	AITC	Soham Chakraborty	BJP	Samarendranath Ghosh	CPI(M)	Pravas Majumder	INC	Pooja Roy Chowdhury
29 April 2026	Nadia	78	Tehatta	AITC	Dilip Poddar	BJP	Subrata Kabiraj	CPI(M)	Subodh Biswas	INC	Jyotirmoy Sarkar
29 April 2026	Nadia	79	Palashipara	AITC	Rukbanur Rahman	BJP	Anima Dutta	AISF	Samshur Ali Mallick	INC	Hamidul Haque
29 April 2026	Nadia	80	Kaliganj	AITC	Alifa Ahmed	BJP	Bapan Ghosh	CPI(M)	Sabina Yasmin	INC	Kabil Uddin Shaikh
29 April 2026	Nadia	81	Nakashipara	AITC	Kallol Khan	BJP	Shantanu Dey	CPI(M)	Sukla Saha	INC	Golam Kibria Mandal
29 April 2026	Nadia	82	Chapra	AITC	Jeber Sekh	BJP	Saikat Sarkar	AISF	Jakir Mondal	INC	Rahidul Mandal
29 April 2026	Nadia	83	Krishnanagar Uttar	AITC	Somnath Dutta	BJP	Taraknath Chatterjee	CPI(M)	Adwaita Biswas	INC	Arghya Gon
29 April 2026	Nadia	84	Nabadwip	AITC	Pundarikakshya Saha	BJP	Shruti Shekhar Goswami	CPI(M)	Swarnendu Sinha	INC	Samir Saha
29 April 2026	Nadia	85	Krishnanagar Dakshin	AITC	Ujjal Biswas	BJP	Sadhan Ghosh	CPI(ML)L	Laboni Jangi	INC	Abdur Rahim Shaikh
29 April 2026	Nadia	86	Santipur	AITC	Braja Kishore Goswami	BJP	Swapan Das	CPI(M)	Soumen Mahato	INC	Alok Chatterjee
29 April 2026	Nadia	87	Ranaghat Uttar Paschim	AITC	Tapas Ghosh	BJP	Parthasarathi Chatterjee	CPI(M)	Debashis Chakraborty	INC	Naba Kumar Mondal
29 April 2026	Nadia	88	Krishnaganj (SC)	AITC	Samir Kumar Poddar	BJP	Sukanta Biswas	CPI(M)	Archana Biswas	INC	Sankar Kumar Sarkar
29 April 2026	Nadia	89	Ranaghat Uttar Purba (SC)	AITC	Barnali Dey Roy	BJP	Ashim Biswas	CPI(M)	Mrinal Biswas	INC	Nitya Gopal Mondal
29 April 2026	Nadia	90	Ranaghat Dakshin (SC)	AITC	Sougata Kumar Burman	BJP	Ashim Kumar Biswas	CPI(M)	Arindram Biswas	INC	Rita Pal Das
29 April 2026	Nadia	91	Chakdaha	AITC	Subhankar Singha	BJP	Bankim Chandra Ghosh	CPI(M)	Narayan Dasgupta	INC	Malay Saha
29 April 2026	Nadia	92	Kalyani (SC)	AITC	Atindra Nath Mondal	BJP	Anupam Biswas	CPI(M)	Sabuj Das	INC	Asimananda Majumder
29 April 2026	Nadia	93	Haringhata (SC)	AITC	Rajib Biswas	BJP	Ashim Kumar Sarkar	CPI(M)	Swapan Sarkar	INC	Himanti Das
29 April 2026	North 24 Parganas	94	Bagdah (SC)	AITC	Madhuparna Thakur	BJP	Soma Thakur	AIFB	Gour Biswas	INC	Prabir Kirtania
29 April 2026	North 24 Parganas	95	Bangaon Uttar (SC)	AITC	Biswajit Das	BJP	Ashok Kirtania	CPI(M)	Pijush Saha	INC	Nilanjan Saha
29 April 2026	North 24 Parganas	96	Bangaon Dakshin (SC)	AITC	Rituparna Addhya	BJP	Swapan Majumder	CPI(M)	Asish Sarkar	INC	Kishor Biswas
29 April 2026	North 24 Parganas	97	Gaighata (SC)	AITC	Narottam Biswas	BJP	Subrata Thakur	CPI	Sajal Biswas	INC	Anil Kumar Pandey
29 April 2026	North 24 Parganas	98	Swarupnagar (SC)	AITC	Bina Mondal	BJP	Tarak Saha	CPI(M)	Biswajit Mondal	INC	Ritesh Mondal
29 April 2026	North 24 Parganas	99	Baduria	AITC	Burhanul Mokaddin	BJP	Sukriti Sarkar	AISF	Md. Qutubuddin Fatehi	INC	Abdur Rahim Quazi
29 April 2026	North 24 Parganas	100	Habra	AITC	Jyotipriya Mallick	BJP	Debdas Mondal	CPI(M)	Rijinandan Biswas	INC	Pronob Bhattacharya
29 April 2026	North 24 Parganas	101	Ashoknagar	AITC	Narayan Goswami	BJP	Sumay Hira	AISF	Tapas Banerjee	INC	Angshuman Roy
29 April 2026	North 24 Parganas	102	Amdanga	AITC	Pirzada Kasem Siddiqui	BJP	Arindam Dey	AISF	Biswajit Maity	INC	Gopal Ghosh
29 April 2026	North 24 Parganas	103	Bijpur	AITC	Subodh Adhikary	BJP	Sudipta Das	CPI(M)	Debasish Rakshit	INC	Sibabrata Guha Roy
29 April 2026	North 24 Parganas	104	Naihati	AITC	Sanat Dey	BJP	Sumitro Chatterjee	CPI(ML)L	Debojyoti Majumder	INC	Pradip Kumar Kundu
29 April 2026	North 24 Parganas	105	Bhatpara	AITC	Amit Gupta	BJP	Pawan Singh	CPI(M)	Aasnarayan Singh	INC	Dharmendra Shaw
29 April 2026	North 24 Parganas	106	Jagatdal	AITC	Somenath Shyam Ichini	BJP	Rajesh Kumar	AIFB	Parvej Ahmad Khan	INC	Mandira Chakraborty
29 April 2026	North 24 Parganas	107	Noapara	AITC	Trinankur Bhattacharya	BJP	Arjun Singh	CPI(M)	Gargi Chatterjee	INC	Ashok Bhattacharya
29 April 2026	North 24 Parganas	108	Barrackpore	AITC	Raj Chakraborty	BJP	Kaustuv Bagchi	CPI(M)	Suman Bandyopadhyay	INC	Sambhu Das
29 April 2026	North 24 Parganas	109	Khardaha	AITC	Devdeep Purohit	BJP	Kalyan Chakraborti	CPI(M)	Debojyoti Das	INC	Joydev Ghosh
29 April 2026	North 24 Parganas	110	Dum Dum Uttar	AITC	Chandrima Bhattacharya	BJP	Sourav Sikdar	CPI(M)	Dipsita Dhar	INC	Dhananjoy Moitra
29 April 2026	North 24 Parganas	111	Panihati	AITC	Tirthankar Ghosh	BJP	Ratna Debnath	CPI(M)	Kalatan Dasgupta	INC	Subhashis Bhattacharya
29 April 2026	North 24 Parganas	112	Kamarhati	AITC	Madan Mitra	BJP	Arup Choudhury	CPI(M)	Manash Mukherjee	INC	Kallol Mukherjee
29 April 2026	North 24 Parganas	113	Baranagar	AITC	Sayantika Banerjee	BJP	Sajal Ghosh	CPI(M)	Sayandip Mitra	INC	Kalyani Chakraborty
29 April 2026	North 24 Parganas	114	Dum Dum	AITC	Bratya Basu	BJP	Arijit Bakshi	CPI(M)	Mayukh Biswas	INC	Susmita Biswas
29 April 2026	North 24 Parganas	115	Rajarhat New Town	AITC	Tapash Chatterjee	BJP	Piyush Kanodia	CPI(M)	Saptarshi Deb	INC	Sheikh Nijamuddin
29 April 2026	North 24 Parganas	116	Bidhannagar	AITC	Sujit Bose	BJP	Sharadwat Mukhopadhyay	CPI(M)	Soumyajit Raha	INC	Ranajit Mukherjee
29 April 2026	North 24 Parganas	117	Rajarhat Gopalpur	AITC	Aditi Munshi	BJP	Tarunjyoti Tiwari	CPI(M)	Subhajit Dasgupta	INC	Partha Bhaumik
29 April 2026	North 24 Parganas	118	Madhyamgram	AITC	Rathin Ghosh	BJP	Anindya Banerjee	AISF	Priyanka Barman	INC	Ananta Roy
29 April 2026	North 24 Parganas	119	Barasat	AITC	Sabyasachi Dutta	BJP	Sankar Chatterjee	AIFB	Hemanta Das	INC	Tarak Mukherjee
29 April 2026	North 24 Parganas	120	Deganga	AITC	Anisur Rahaman Bidesh	BJP	Tarun Kanti Ghosh	AISF	Md. Mafidul Haque Sahaji	INC	Miaraj Baidya
29 April 2026	North 24 Parganas	121	Haroa	AITC	Md. Mufti Abdul Matin	BJP	Bhaskar Mondal	AISF	Piyarul Islam	INC	Md. Rabiul Molla
29 April 2026	North 24 Parganas	122	Minakhan (SC)	AITC	Usha Rani Mondal	BJP	Rudrendra Patra	AISF	Pratik Mondal	INC	Barnali Naskar
29 April 2026	North 24 Parganas	123	Sandeshkhali (ST)	AITC	Jharna Sardar	BJP	Sanat Sardar	CPI(M)	Rabindra Nath Mahato	INC	Judhisthir Bhumiji
29 April 2026	North 24 Parganas	124	Basirhat Dakshin	AITC	Surajit Mitra	BJP	Sourya Banerjee	CPI(M)	Ainul Arefin	INC	Abu Ishak Gazi
29 April 2026	North 24 Parganas	125	Basirhat Uttar	AITC	Md. Tauseef Rahman	BJP	Kaushik Siddharth	AISF	Md. Mucha Karimullah	INC	Musa Haque Mondal
29 April 2026	North 24 Parganas	126	Hingalganj (SC)	AITC	Ananda Sarkar	BJP	Rekha Patra	CPI	Nirmal Kumar Biswas	INC	Biswajit Roy
29 April 2026	South 24 Parganas	127	Gosaba (SC)	AITC	Subrata Mondal	BJP	Bikarno Naskar	RSP	Aditya Jotdar	INC	Bhupal Chandra Das
29 April 2026	South 24 Parganas	128	Basanti (SC)	AITC	Nilima Bishal Mistry	BJP	Bikash Sardar	AISF	Asit Roy	INC	Gopinath Naiya
29 April 2026	South 24 Parganas	129	Kultali (SC)	AITC	Ganesh Chandra Mondal	BJP	Madhabi Mahalder	CPI(M)	Ram Sankar Halder	INC	Rupa Halder
29 April 2026	South 24 Parganas	130	Patharpratima	AITC	Samir Kumar Jana	BJP	Asit Kumar Halder	CPI(M)	Satya Ranjan Das	INC	Subhrangshu Nayek
29 April 2026	South 24 Parganas	131	Kakdwip	AITC	Manturam Pakhira	BJP	Dipankar Jana	CPI(M)	Narayan Das	INC	Nasiruddin Ahamed
29 April 2026	South 24 Parganas	132	Sagar	AITC	Bankim Chandra Hazra	BJP	Sumanta Mandal	CPI(M)	Swapan Singha	INC	Prasanta Khutia
29 April 2026	South 24 Parganas	133	Kulpi	AITC	Barnali Dhara	BJP	Abni Naskar	AISF	Abdul Malek Mollah	INC	Kutub Uddin Molla
29 April 2026	South 24 Parganas	134	Raidighi	AITC	Tapas Mondal	BJP	Palash Rana	CPI(M)	Samya Ganguly	INC	Ashish Kumar Mandal
29 April 2026	South 24 Parganas	135	Mandirbazar (SC)	AITC	Joydeb Halder	BJP	Mallika Paik	AISF	Ashok Kumar Gayen	INC	Kaushik Baidya
29 April 2026	South 24 Parganas	136	Jaynagar (SC)	AITC	Biswanath Das	BJP	Alok Halder	CPI(M)	Apurba Pramanik	INC	Tapas Baidya
29 April 2026	South 24 Parganas	137	Baruipur Purba (SC)	AITC	Bivas Sardar	BJP	Tumpa Sardar	CPI(M)	Swapan Naskar	INC	Pratap Chandra Mondal
29 April 2026	South 24 Parganas	138	Canning Paschim (SC)	AITC	Paresh Ram Das	BJP	Prashanta Bayen	AISF	Prabir Mondal	INC	Haran Chandra Mistry
29 April 2026	South 24 Parganas	139	Canning Purba	AITC	Md. Baharul Islam	BJP	Ashim Sapui	AISF	Arabul Islam	INC	Sabir Ali Sardar
29 April 2026	South 24 Parganas	140	Baruipur Paschim	AITC	Biman Banerjee	BJP	Biswajit Paul	CPI(M)	Lahek Ali	INC	Asitlal Nag
29 April 2026	South 24 Parganas	141	Magrahat Purba (SC)	AITC	Sarmistha Purkait	BJP	Uttam Kumar Banik	CPI(M)	Chandan Saha	INC	Atanu Halder
29 April 2026	South 24 Parganas	142	Magrahat Paschim	AITC	Md. Samim Ahamed Molla	BJP	Gour Sundar Ghosh	AISF	Abdul Ajij al Hasan	Did not contest	
29 April 2026	South 24 Parganas	143	Diamond Harbour	AITC	Pannalal Halder	BJP	Dipak Kumar Halder	CPI(M)	Samarendra Nath Naiya	INC	Goutam Bhattacharya
29 April 2026	South 24 Parganas	144	Falta	AITC	Jahangir Khan (Note: AITC candidate Jahangir Khan withdrew himself from the election. However, since as per ECI schedule, last date to withdraw name was 13 April 2026, the candidate's name still appeared on the EVM.)	BJP	Debangshu Panda	CPI(M)	Sambhu Kurmi	INC	Abdur Rajjak Molla
29 April 2026	South 24 Parganas	145	Satgachhia	AITC	Somashree Betal	BJP	Agniswar Naskar	CPI(M)	Gautam Pal	INC	Pravash Ghosh
29 April 2026	South 24 Parganas	146	Bishnupur (SC)	AITC	Dilip Mondal	BJP	Abhijit Sardar	CPI(M)	Shyamal Dal	INC	Arghya Naskar
29 April 2026	South 24 Parganas	147	Sonarpur Dakshin	AITC	Arundhuti Maitra	BJP	Roopa Ganguly	CPI	Paramita Dasgupta	INC	Subrata Datta
29 April 2026	South 24 Parganas	148	Bhangar	AITC	Saokat Molla	BJP	Jayanta Gayen	AISF	Naushad Siddiqui	INC	Mahabubul Islam
29 April 2026	South 24 Parganas	149	Kasba	AITC	Javed Ahmed Khan	BJP	Sandeep Banerjee	CPI(M)	Dipu Das	INC	Md. Hasim Zeshan Ahmad
29 April 2026	South 24 Parganas	150	Jadavpur	AITC	Debabrata Majumdar	BJP	Sarbori Mukherjee	CPI(M)	Bikash Ranjan Bhattacharya	INC	Shyamali Mandal
29 April 2026	South 24 Parganas	151	Sonarpur Uttar	AITC	Firdousi Begum	BJP	Debashish Dhar	CPI(M)	Monalisa Sinha	INC	Jagannath Kumir
29 April 2026	South 24 Parganas	152	Tollygunge	AITC	Aroop Biswas	BJP	Papiya Adhikari	CPI(M)	Partha Pratim Biswas	INC	Manas Sinha Roy
29 April 2026	South 24 Parganas	153	Behala Purba	AITC	Subhasish Chakraborty	BJP	Shankar Sikdar	CPI(M)	Niloy Majumder	INC	Abhijit Raha
29 April 2026	South 24 Parganas	154	Behala Paschim	AITC	Ratna Chatterjee	BJP	Indranil Khan	CPI(M)	Nihar Bhakta	INC	Saibal Roy
29 April 2026	South 24 Parganas	155	Maheshtala	AITC	Subhasis Das	BJP	Tamanath Bhowmik	CPI(M)	Sayan Banerjee	INC	Haji Abdul Hannan
29 April 2026	South 24 Parganas	156	Budge Budge	AITC	Ashok Kumar Deb	BJP	Tarun Kumar Adak	CPI(ML)L	Kajol Dutta Ghosh	INC	Mujibar Rahaman Kayal
29 April 2026	South 24 Parganas	157	Metiaburuz	AITC	Abdul Khaleque Molla	BJP	Veer Bahadur Singh	CPI(M)	Monirul Islam	INC	Md. Mukhtar
29 April 2026	Kolkata	158	Kolkata Port	AITC	Firhad Hakim	BJP	Rakesh Singh	CPI(M)	Faiyaz Khan	INC	Aquib Gulzar
29 April 2026	Kolkata	159	Bhabanipur	AITC	Mamata Banerjee	BJP	Suvendu Adhikari	CPI(M)	Shrijeeb Biswas	INC	Pradip Prasad
29 April 2026	Kolkata	160	Rashbehari	AITC	Debasish Kumar	BJP	Swapan Dasgupta	CPI(ML)L	Manas Ghosh	INC	Ashutosh Chatterjee
29 April 2026	Kolkata	161	Ballygunge	AITC	Sovandeb Chattopadhyay	BJP	Shatarupa	CPI(M)	Afrin Begum	INC	Rohan Mitra
29 April 2026	Kolkata	162	Chowrangee	AITC	Nayna Bandopadhyay	BJP	Santosh Pathak	CPI(M)	Sanjoy Basu (Note: RCPI candidate fighting on CPI(M) symbol.)	INC	Manash Sarkar
29 April 2026	Kolkata	163	Entally	AITC	Sandipan Saha	BJP	Priyanka Tibrewal	CPI(M)	Abdur Rouf	INC	Kashif Reza
29 April 2026	Kolkata	164	Beleghata	AITC	Kunal Ghosh	BJP	Partha Choudhary	CPI(M)	Paramita Roy	INC	Shahina Javed
29 April 2026	Kolkata	165	Jorasanko	AITC	Vijay Upadhayay	BJP	Vijay Ojha	CPI(M)	Bharat Ram Tiwari	INC	Deepak Singh
29 April 2026	Kolkata	166	Shyampukur	AITC	Sashi Panja	BJP	Poornima Chakraborty	AIFB	Jhuma Das	INC	Purna Ghosh
29 April 2026	Kolkata	167	Maniktala	AITC	Shreya Pandey	BJP	Tapas Roy	CPI	Mousumi Ghosh	INC	Suman Roy Chowdhury
29 April 2026	Kolkata	168	Kashipur–Belgachhia	AITC	Atin Ghosh	BJP	Ritesh Tiwari	CPI(M)	Rajinder Gupta	INC	Tarak Pal
29 April 2026	Howrah	169	Bally	AITC	Kailash Mishra	BJP	Sanjay Kumar Singh	CPI(M)	Sankar Moitra	INC	Priyanka Choudhury
29 April 2026	Howrah	170	Howrah Uttar	AITC	Goutam Chowdhuri	BJP	Umesh Rai	CPI(M)	Gautam Roy	INC	Om Prakash Jaiswal
29 April 2026	Howrah	171	Howrah Madhya	AITC	Arup Roy	BJP	Biplab Mondal	CPI(M)	Imteaz Ahmed	INC	Aparna Bose
29 April 2026	Howrah	172	Shibpur	AITC	Rana Chatterjee	BJP	Rudranil Ghosh	AIFB	Jagannath Bhattacharya	INC	Shrabanti Singh
29 April 2026	Howrah	173	Howrah Dakshin	AITC	Nandita Chowdhury	BJP	Shyamal Hati	CPI(M)	Abhijit Bandyopadhyay	INC	Deepsikha Bhowmick
29 April 2026	Howrah	174	Sankrail (SC)	AITC	Priya Paul	BJP	Barnali Dhali	CPI(M)	Samir Malick	INC	Bechu Ram Malik
29 April 2026	Howrah	175	Panchla	AITC	Gulsan Mullick	BJP	Ranjan Kumar Paul	AIFB	Farid Molla	INC	Rahul Pandey
29 April 2026	Howrah	176	Uluberia Purba	AITC	Ritabrata Banerjee	BJP	Rudra Prasad Banerjee	AISF	Ansar Ali Sheikh	INC	Alam Deiyan Sheikh
29 April 2026	Howrah	177	Uluberia Uttar (SC)	AITC	Bimal Kumar Das	BJP	Chiran Bera	CPI(M)	Ashok Dolui	INC	Kalyani Haldar
29 April 2026	Howrah	178	Uluberia Dakshin	AITC	Pulak Roy	BJP	Mangalanand Puri Maharaj	AIFB	Amirul Islam Khan	INC	Intaz Ali Shah
29 April 2026	Howrah	179	Shyampur	AITC	Nadebasi Jana	BJP	Hiran Chatterjee	AIFB	Asit Baran Sau	INC	Sheikh Manjur Alam
29 April 2026	Howrah	180	Bagnan	AITC	Arunava Sen	BJP	Premangshu Rana	CPI(M)	Bhaskar Roy	INC	Sheikh Hafizur Rahaman
29 April 2026	Howrah	181	Amta	AITC	Sukanta Kumar Paul	BJP	Amit Samanta	CPI(M)	Joshimuddin Mallick	INC	Tapan Das
29 April 2026	Howrah	182	Udaynarayanpur	AITC	Samir Kumar Panja	BJP	Prabhakar Pandit	CPI(M)	Shasthi Maji	INC	Asit Bakuly
29 April 2026	Howrah	183	Jagatballavpur	AITC	Subir Chatterjee	BJP	Anupam Ghosh	AISF	Nazira Khatoon	INC	Koushik Roy
29 April 2026	Howrah	184	Domjur	AITC	Tapas Maity	BJP	Gobinda Hazra	CPI(M)	Dulu Das	INC	Aloke Koley
29 April 2026	Hooghly	185	Uttarpara	AITC	Sirsanya Banerjee	BJP	Dipanjan Chakraborty	CPI(M)	Minakshi Mukherjee	INC	Subrata Mukherjee
29 April 2026	Hooghly	186	Sreerampur	AITC	Tanmay Ghosh	BJP	Bhaskar Bhattacharya	CPI(M)	Nabanita Chakraborty	INC	Subhankar Sarkar
29 April 2026	Hooghly	187	Champdani	AITC	Arindam Guin	BJP	Dilip Singh	CPI(M)	Chandranath Banerjee	INC	Pritam Ghosh
29 April 2026	Hooghly	188	Singur	AITC	Becharam Manna	BJP	Arup Kumar Das	CPI(M)	Debasish Chatterjee	INC	Barun Kumar Malik
29 April 2026	Hooghly	189	Chandannagar	AITC	Indranil Sen	BJP	Dipanjan Guha	CPI(M)	Manish Panda	INC	Ratan Kumar Goldar
29 April 2026	Hooghly	190	Chunchura	AITC	Debangshu Bhattacharya	BJP	Subir Nag	AIFB	Sunil Saha	INC	Moinul Haque
29 April 2026	Hooghly	191	Balagarh (SC)	AITC	Ranjan Dhara	BJP	Sumana Sarkar	CPI(M)	Bikash Goldar	INC	Ashok Biswas
29 April 2026	Hooghly	192	Pandua	AITC	Samir Chakraborty	BJP	Tushar Kumar Majumdar	CPI(M)	Amjad Hossain	INC	Sanatan Mandi
29 April 2026	Hooghly	193	Saptagram	AITC	Bidesh Ranjan Bose	BJP	Swaraj Ghosh	CPI(M)	Anirban Sarkar	INC	Sougata Ghosh
29 April 2026	Hooghly	194	Chanditala	AITC	Swati Khandoker	BJP	Debasish Mukherjee	CPI(M)	Sheikh Asif Ali	INC	Sheikh Abu Abbasuddin
29 April 2026	Hooghly	195	Jangipara	AITC	Snehasish Chakraborty	BJP	Prasenjit Bag	CPI(M)	Sudipto Sarkar	INC	Subhashis Datta
29 April 2026	Hooghly	196	Haripal	AITC	Karabi Manna	BJP	Madhumita Ghosh	AISF	Sheikh Muzaffar Ali	INC	Saif Azad
29 April 2026	Hooghly	197	Dhanekhali (SC)	AITC	Ashima Patra	BJP	Barnali Das	CPI(ML)L	Ruma Aheri	INC	Jyoti Kumari Das
29 April 2026	Hooghly	198	Tarakeswar	AITC	Ramendu Sinharay	BJP	Santu Pan	CPI(M)	Abesh Khamrui	INC	Bhabani Prasad Mondal
29 April 2026	Hooghly	199	Pursurah	AITC	Partha Hazari	BJP	Biman Ghosh	CPI(M)	Sandip Kumar Samanta	INC	Sheikh Habibur Rahaman
29 April 2026	Hooghly	200	Arambagh (SC)	AITC	Mita Bag	BJP	Hemanta Bag	CPI(M)	Bithika Pandit	INC	Sushil Kumar Santra
29 April 2026	Hooghly	201	Goghat (SC)	AITC	Nirmal Maji	BJP	Prasanta Digar	AIFB	Muktaram Dhaure	INC	Haradhan Santra
29 April 2026	Hooghly	202	Khanakul	AITC	Palash Roy	BJP	Susanta Ghosh	AISF	Sheikh Saddam Hossein	INC	Pradip Kumar Kar
23 April 2026	Purba Medinipur	203	Tamluk	AITC	Dipendra Narayan Roy	BJP	Hare Krishna Bera	CPI	Nabendu Ghara	INC	Haradhan Mazumder
23 April 2026	Purba Medinipur	204	Panskura Purba	AITC	Asim Kumar Maji	BJP	Subrata Maity	CPI(M)	Sheikh Ibrahim Ali	INC	Dipak Patra
23 April 2026	Purba Medinipur	205	Panskura Paschim	AITC	Siraj Khan	BJP	Sintu Senapati	AISF	Afjal Ali Shah	INC	Kalyan Roy
23 April 2026	Purba Medinipur	206	Moyna	AITC	Chandan Mondal	BJP	Ashok Dinda	CPI	Swapan Barman	INC	Nimai Barman
23 April 2026	Purba Medinipur	207	Nandakumar	AITC	Sukumar Dey	BJP	Nirmal Khanra	CPI(M)	Chandan Maity	INC	Sheikh Matin
23 April 2026	Purba Medinipur	208	Mahisadal	AITC	Tilak Chakraborty	BJP	Subhas Chandra Panja	CPI(M)	Paritosh Patnayak	INC	Kajal Nayek Das
23 April 2026	Purba Medinipur	209	Haldia (SC)	AITC	Tapasi Mondal	BJP	Pradip Kumar Bijali	CPI(M)	Ashok Patra	INC	Abhimanyu Mandal
23 April 2026	Purba Medinipur	210	Nandigram	AITC	Pabitra Kar	BJP	Suvendu Adhikari	CPI	Shanti Giri	INC	Sheikh Jariatul Hossain
23 April 2026	Purba Medinipur	210	Nandigram	AITC	Pabitra Kar	BJP	Suvendu Adhikari	AISF	Ali Mohammad Sabe Miraj Khan (Note: Friendly contests between the two candidates)	INC	Sheikh Jariatul Hossain
23 April 2026	Purba Medinipur	211	Chandipur	AITC	Uttam Barik	BJP	Pijush Kanti Das	CPI(M)	Rita Das	INC	Sheikh Taslim Ahmed
23 April 2026	Purba Medinipur	212	Patashpur	AITC	Pijush Kanti Panda	BJP	Tapan Maity	CPI	Saikat Giri	INC	Pranab Kumar Mahapatra
23 April 2026	Purba Medinipur	213	Kanthi Uttar	AITC	Debasis Bhunia	BJP	Sumita Sinha	CPI(M)	Sutanu Maity	INC	Subrata Mahapatra
23 April 2026	Purba Medinipur	214	Bhagabanpur	AITC	Manab Kumar Porua	BJP	Shantanu Pramanik	RSP	Pratibha Rani Kar Sasamal	INC	Biswajit Panigrahi
23 April 2026	Purba Medinipur	215	Khejuri (SC)	AITC	Rabin Chandra Mandal	BJP	Subrata Paik	CPI(M)	Himangshu Das	INC	Asit Pramanik
23 April 2026	Purba Medinipur	216	Kanthi Dakshin	AITC	Tarun Kumar Jana	BJP	Arup Kumar Das	CPI	Teheran Hossain	INC	Sheikh Masud Malik
23 April 2026	Purba Medinipur	217	Ramnagar	AITC	Akhil Giri	BJP	Chandra Sekhar Mondal	CPI(M)	Ashoke Kumar Maity	INC	Nomination rejected
23 April 2026	Purba Medinipur	218	Egra	AITC	Tarun Maity	BJP	Dibyendu Adhikari	CPI(M)	Subrata Panda	INC	Anjan Kumar Pattnayak
23 April 2026	Paschim Medinipur	219	Dantan	AITC	Manik Maity	BJP	Ajit Kumar Jana	CPI	Shyamalkanti Das Pattanayek	INC	Utpal Dutta
23 April 2026	Jhargram	220	Nayagram (ST)	AITC	Dulal Murmu	BJP	Amiya Kisku	CPI(M)	Pulin Bihari Baske	INC	Prasanta Murmu
23 April 2026	Jhargram	221	Gopiballavpur	AITC	Ajit Mahata	BJP	Rajesh Mahata	CPI	Bikash Sarangi	INC	Sourav Ghosh
23 April 2026	Jhargram	222	Jhargram	AITC	Mangal Saren	BJP	Lakshmi Kanta Sau	CPI(M)	Arjun Mahato	INC	Prasenjit Dey
23 April 2026	Paschim Medinipur	223	Keshiary (ST)	AITC	Ramjiban Mandi	BJP	Bhadra Hembram	CPI(M)	Malina Murmu	INC	Kaluchand Tudu
23 April 2026	Paschim Medinipur	224	Kharagpur Sadar	AITC	Pradip Sarkar	BJP	Dilip Ghosh	CPI(M)	Madhusudan Roy	INC	Papiya Chakraborty
23 April 2026	Paschim Medinipur	225	Narayangarh	AITC	Pratibha Rani Maity	BJP	Rama Prasad Giri	CPI(M)	Tapas Sinha	INC	Sheikh Alam Hossain
23 April 2026	Paschim Medinipur	226	Sabang	AITC	Manas Bhunia	BJP	Amal Panda	CPI(M)	Nakul Chandra Bera	INC	Aloke Kumar Samui
23 April 2026	Paschim Medinipur	227	Pingla	AITC	Ajit Maity	BJP	Swagata Manna	CPI	Ashoke Sen	INC	Sushanta Mandal
23 April 2026	Paschim Medinipur	228	Kharagpur	AITC	Dinen Roy	BJP	Tapan Bhuiya	CPI(M)	Sheikh Shahjahan Ali	INC	Ujjal Mukherjee
23 April 2026	Paschim Medinipur	229	Debra	AITC	Rajib Banerjee	BJP	Subhashis Om	CPI(M)	Sumit Adhikary	INC	Chittaranjan Jana
23 April 2026	Paschim Medinipur	230	Daspur	AITC	Ashish Hudait	BJP	Tapan Dutta	CPI(M)	Ranjit Pal	INC	Kousik Goswami
23 April 2026	Paschim Medinipur	231	Ghatal (SC)	AITC	Shyamali Sardar	BJP	Shital Kapat	CPI(M)	Shantinath Satik	INC	Kaberi Dolui
23 April 2026	Paschim Medinipur	232	Chandrakona (SC)	AITC	Surjya Kanta Dolui	BJP	Sukanta Dolui	CPI(M)	Suparna Dolui	INC	Manika Middya
23 April 2026	Paschim Medinipur	233	Garbeta	AITC	Uttara Singha	BJP	Pradip Lodha	CPI(M)	Tapan Ghosh	INC	Siddhartha Bishoyee
23 April 2026	Paschim Medinipur	234	Salboni	AITC	Srikanta Mahata	BJP	Biman Mahata	AISF	Piyush Hansda	INC	Arup Mukherjee
23 April 2026	Paschim Medinipur	235	Keshpur (SC)	AITC	Seuli Saha	BJP	Suvendu Samanta	CPI(M)	Gurupada Mondal	INC	Kamal Kishore Khanna
23 April 2026	Paschim Medinipur	236	Medinipur	AITC	Sujoy Hazra	BJP	Sankar Kumar Guchhait	CPI	Monikuntal Khamrui	INC	Sambhunath Chattopadhyay
23 April 2026	Jhargram	237	Binpur (ST)	AITC	Birbaha Hansda	BJP	Pranat Tudu	CPI(M)	Rabi Sing Sardar	INC	Golapi Soren
23 April 2026	Purulia	238	Bandwan (ST)	AITC	Rajib Lochan Saren	BJP	Labsen Baskey	CPI(M)	Rathu Singh Sardar	INC	Siten Mandi
23 April 2026	Purulia	239	Balarampur	AITC	Shantiram Mahato	BJP	Jaladhar Mahato	CPI(M)	Namita Mahato	INC	Sukanta Mahato
23 April 2026	Purulia	240	Baghmundi	AITC	Sushanta Mahato	BJP	Rahidas Mahato	AIFB	Parimal Kumar	INC	Nepal Mahato
23 April 2026	Purulia	241	Joypur	AITC	Arjun Mahato	BJP	Biswajit Mahato (Note: Independent candidate fighting on BJP symbol.)	AIFB	Dhirendra Nath Mahato	INC	Phani Bhushan Kumar
23 April 2026	Purulia	242	Purulia	AITC	Sujoy Banerjee	BJP	Sudip Kumar Mukherjee	CPI(M)	Sayantan Ghosh	INC	Dibyajyoti Prasad Singh Deo
23 April 2026	Purulia	243	Manbazar (ST)	AITC	Sandhya Rani Tudu	BJP	Moyna Murmu	CPI(M)	Shantimani Murmu	INC	Sombari Mahali
23 April 2026	Purulia	244	Kashipur	AITC	Soumen Beltharia	BJP	Kamalakanta Hansda	CPI(M)	Sulekha Bauri	INC	Subhas Mahato
23 April 2026	Purulia	245	Para (SC)	AITC	Manik Bauri	BJP	Nadiar Chand Bouri	CPI(M)	Aloke Bauri	INC	Phalguni Bauri
23 April 2026	Purulia	246	Raghunathpur (SC)	AITC	Hazari Bauri	BJP	Mamoni Bauri	CPI(M)	Ganesh Bauri	INC	Sandhya Bauri
23 April 2026	Bankura	247	Saltora (SC)	AITC	Uttam Bauri	BJP	Chandana Bauri	CPI(M)	Nandalal Bauri	INC	Amar Kanti Mandal
23 April 2026	Bankura	248	Chhatna	AITC	Swapan Kumar Mandal	BJP	Satyanarayan Mukhopadhyay	RSP	Rajib Kar	INC	Partha Pratim Bose
23 April 2026	Bankura	249	Ranibandh (ST)	AITC	Tanushree Hansda	BJP	Kshudiram Tudu	CPI(M)	Deblina Hembram	INC	Gurupada Sardar
23 April 2026	Bankura	250	Raipur (ST)	AITC	Thakur Moni Soren	BJP	Kshetra Mohan Hansda	CPI(M)	Ram Mandi	INC	Subhra Hembram Murmu
23 April 2026	Bankura	251	Taldangra	AITC	Falguni Singhababu	BJP	Souvik Patra	CPI(M)	Debkanti Mohanti	INC	Nayan Das Chakraborty
23 April 2026	Bankura	252	Bankura	AITC	Anup Mondal	BJP	Niladri Sekhar Dana	CPI(M)	Abhayananda Mukherjee	INC	Arup Banerjee
23 April 2026	Bankura	253	Barjora	AITC	Gautam Mishra	BJP	Billeswar Sinha	CPI(M)	Sujit Chakraborty	INC	Vivekananda Keora
23 April 2026	Bankura	254	Onda	AITC	Subrata Dutta	BJP	Amarnath Shakha	AIFB	Asit Sharma	INC	Paban Salampuria
23 April 2026	Bankura	255	Bishnupur	AITC	Tanmay Ghosh	BJP	Shukla Chatterjee	CPI(ML)L	Titas Gupta	INC	Ujjal Chandra
23 April 2026	Bankura	256	Katulpur (SC)	AITC	Harakali Protiher	BJP	Lakshmikanta Majumdar	CPI(M)	Ramchandra Roy	INC	Sumitra Mallick Santra
23 April 2026	Bankura	257	Indas (SC)	AITC	Shyamali Roy Bagdi	BJP	Nirmal Kumar Dhara	CPI(M)	Mona Mallick	INC	Mou Mandal Samanta
23 April 2026	Bankura	258	Sonamukhi (SC)	AITC	Kallol Saha	BJP	Dibakar Gharami	CPI(M)	Ajit Roy	INC	Rahul Bauri
29 April 2026	Purba Bardhaman	259	Khandaghosh (SC)	AITC	Nabin Chandra Bag	BJP	Gautam Dhara	CPI(M)	Ramjiban Roy	INC	Arup Kumar Saha
29 April 2026	Purba Bardhaman	260	Bardhaman Dakshin	AITC	Khokan Das	BJP	Moumita Biswas	CPI(M)	Sudipta Gupta	INC	Gourab Samaddar
29 April 2026	Purba Bardhaman	261	Raina (SC)	AITC	Madira Dalui	BJP	Subhash Patra	CPI(M)	Somnath Majhi	INC	Anik Saha
29 April 2026	Purba Bardhaman	262	Jamalpur (SC)	AITC	Bhootnath Mallick	BJP	Arun Halder	CPI(M)	Samar Hazra (Note: MFB candidate fighting on CPI(M) symbol.)	INC	Rajib Saha
29 April 2026	Purba Bardhaman	263	Monteswar	AITC	Siddiqullah Chowdhury	BJP	Saikat Panja	CPI(M)	Anupam Ghosh	INC	Jyotirmoy Mondal
29 April 2026	Purba Bardhaman	264	Kalna (SC)	AITC	Deboprasad Bag	BJP	Siddhartha Majumdar	CPI(M)	Sarmistha Nag Saha	INC	Amal Kumar Saha
29 April 2026	Purba Bardhaman	265	Memari	AITC	Rasbihari Halder	BJP	Manab Guha	CPI(M)	Krishanu Bhadra	INC	Prabir Ganguly
29 April 2026	Purba Bardhaman	266	Bardhaman Uttar (SC)	AITC	Nisith Kumar Malik	BJP	Sanjay Das	CPI(M)	Mamoni Mondal Roy	INC	Sandip Das
29 April 2026	Purba Bardhaman	267	Bhatar	AITC	Shantanu Koner	BJP	Soumen Karfa	CPI(M)	Hasina Khatoon	INC	Dhurjati Bijoy Maji
29 April 2026	Purba Bardhaman	268	Purbasthali Dakshin	AITC	Swapan Debnath	BJP	Prankrishna Tapadar	CPI(ML)L	Ziadul Sekh	INC	Rabindranath Mondal
29 April 2026	Purba Bardhaman	269	Purbasthali Uttar	AITC	Vasundhara Goswami	BJP	Gopal Chattopadhyay	CPI(M)	Pradip Saha	INC	Amitava Bhattacharya
29 April 2026	Purba Bardhaman	270	Katwa	AITC	Rabindranath Chatterjee	BJP	Krishna Ghosh	CPI(M)	Sanjib Das	INC	Ranajit Chatterjee
29 April 2026	Purba Bardhaman	271	Ketugram	AITC	Sekh Sahonawez	BJP	Anadi Ghosh	AISF	Qari Jakir Hossain	INC	Md. Mofirul Kassem
29 April 2026	Purba Bardhaman	272	Mangalkot	AITC	Apurba Chowdhury	BJP	Shishir Ghosh	CPI(M)	Miraj Alam	INC	Jagadish Dutta
29 April 2026	Purba Bardhaman	273	Ausgram (SC)	AITC	Shyama Prasanna Lohar	BJP	Kalita Maji	CPI(M)	Chanchal Majhi	INC	Nisha Boral
29 April 2026	Purba Bardhaman	274	Galsi (SC)	AITC	Alok Kumar Majhi	BJP	Raju Patra	CPI(M)	Monimala Das	INC	Debasish Biswas
23 April 2026	Paschim Bardhaman	275	Pandabeswar	AITC	Narendranath Chakraborty	BJP	Jitendra Tiwari	CPI(M)	Prabir Mondal	INC	Uttam Kumar Roy
23 April 2026	Paschim Bardhaman	276	Durgapur Purba	AITC	Pradip Mazumdar	BJP	Chandra Shekhar Banerjee	CPI(M)	Simanta Chatterjee	INC	Debesh Chakraborty
23 April 2026	Paschim Bardhaman	277	Durgapur Paschim	AITC	Kavi Dutta	BJP	Lakshman Chandra Ghorui	CPI(M)	Pravas Sain	INC	Tarun Roy
23 April 2026	Paschim Bardhaman	278	Raniganj	AITC	Kalobaran Mondal	BJP	Partho Ghosh	CPI(M)	Naran Bauri	INC	Faiz Ahmed
23 April 2026	Paschim Bardhaman	279	Jamuria	AITC	Hareram Singh	BJP	Bijan Mukherjee	CPI(M)	Md. Sabbir Hussain	INC	Tarun Kumar Ganguly
23 April 2026	Paschim Bardhaman	280	Asansol Dakshin	AITC	Tapas Banerjee	BJP	Agnimitra Paul	CPI(M)	Shilpi Chakraborty	INC	Souvik Mukherjee
23 April 2026	Paschim Bardhaman	281	Asansol Uttar	AITC	Moloy Ghatak	BJP	Krishnendu Mukherjee	CPI	Akhilesh Kumar Singh	INC	Prasenjit Puitandi
23 April 2026	Paschim Bardhaman	282	Kulti	AITC	Abhijit Ghatak	BJP	Ajay Kumar Poddar	AIFB	Bhabani Acharya	INC	Rabi Yadav
23 April 2026	Paschim Bardhaman	283	Barabani	AITC	Bidhan Upadhyay	BJP	Arijit Roy	AISF	Biswajit Bauri	INC	Joydev Roy
23 April 2026	Birbhum	284	Dubrajpur (SC)	AITC	Chandra Naresh Bauri	BJP	Anup Kumar Saha	AIFB	Bijoy Bagdi	INC	Sanjoy Byapari
23 April 2026	Birbhum	285	Suri	AITC	Ujjal Chatterjee	BJP	Jagannath Chattopadhyay	CPI(M)	Motiur Rahaman	INC	Sanjoy Adhikary
23 April 2026	Birbhum	286	Bolpur	AITC	Chandranath Sinha	BJP	Dilip Kumar Ghosh	AISF	Bapi Soren	INC	Rathin Sen
23 April 2026	Birbhum	287	Nanoor (SC)	AITC	Bidhan Chandra Majhi	BJP	Khokan Das	CPI(M)	Shyamali Pradhan	INC	Abhay Das
23 April 2026	Birbhum	288	Labpur	AITC	Abhijit Sinha	BJP	Debasish Ojha	CPI(M)	Mansa Hansda	INC	Ratna Sen
23 April 2026	Birbhum	289	Sainthia (SC)	AITC	Nilabati Saha	BJP	Krishna Kanta Saha	CPI(M)	Debu Chunari	INC	Archana Ankur
23 April 2026	Birbhum	290	Mayureswar	AITC	Abhijit Roy	BJP	Dudh Kumar Mondal	CPI(M)	Jayanta Bhalla	INC	Syed Kasafoddoza
23 April 2026	Birbhum	291	Rampurhat	AITC	Ashish Banerjee	BJP	Dhruba Saha	CPI(M)	Sanjib Mallick	INC	Vivekananda Shaw
23 April 2026	Birbhum	292	Hansan	AITC	Fayezul Haque	BJP	Nikhil Banerjee	CPI(M)	Kamal Hasan	INC	Milton Rashid
23 April 2026	Birbhum	293	Nalhati	AITC	Rajendra Prasad Singh	BJP	Anil Singh	AIFB	Dipak Chatterjee	INC	Abdul Karim
23 April 2026	Birbhum	294	Murarai	AITC	Mosarraf Hossain	BJP	Rinki Ghosh	CPI(M)	Md. Ali Reza Mandal	INC	Sanjibur Rahaman

== Surveys and polls ==
=== Opinion polls ===
Seat projections
Polling Agency	Date Published	Sample size	Margin of Error				Lead
Polling Agency	Date Published	Sample size	Margin of Error	AITC+	BJP	Others	Lead
IANS-Matrize	15 March 2026	22630	±3%	155-170	100-115	5-7	40-70
VoteVibe CNN-News18 Opinion Poll-1	23 March 2026	128360	±3%	184-200	98-108	1-3	76-96
VoteVibe CNN-News18 Opinion Poll-2	30 March 2026	128360	±3%	169-179	113-123	1-3	46-66
VoteVibe CNN News18 Opinion Poll-3	6 April 2026	128360	±3%	159-169	120-130	3-7	29-49
Matrize-ABP News	6 April 2026	–	–	140-160	130-150	8-16	Hung

Vote share projections
Polling Agency	Date Published	Sample size	Margin of Error				Lead
Polling Agency	Date Published	Sample size	Margin of Error	AITC+	BJP	Others	Lead
IANS-Matrize	15 March 2026	22630	±3%	43-45%	41-43%	12-16%	0-4%
VoteVibe CNN-News18Opinion Poll-1	23 March 2026	128360	±3%	41.9%	34.9%	22%	7%
VoteVibe CNN-News18 Opinion Poll-2	30 March 2026	128360	±3%	43.4%	38.1%	18%	5.3%
VoteVibe CNN News18 Opinion Poll-3	6 April 2026	128360	±3%	43.7%	39.7%	16%	4%
Matrize-ABP News	6 April 2026	–	–	43%	41%	16%	2%
CVoter Opinion Poll	8 April 2026	–	–	44%	40%	16%	4%
Chanakya Strategies ABP News	8 April 2026	–	–	45-47%	40-42%	12-16%	3-7%

=== Exit polls ===
Seat projections
Polling Agency	Date Published				Lead
Polling Agency	Date Published	AITC+	BJP	Others	Lead
P-MARQ	29 April 2026	118-138	150-175	2-6	12-57
Matrize	29 April 2026	125-140	146-161	6-10	6-36
Chanakya Strategies	29 April 2026	130-140	150-160	6-10	10-30
People's Pulse	29 April 2026	177-187	95-110	0-2	77-82
JVC	29 April 2026	131-152	138-159	0-2	Hung
Poll Diary	29 April 2026	99-127	142-171	5-9	43-44
Praja Poll	29 April 2026	85-110	178-208	0-5	93-98
People's Insight	29 April 2026	138-150	144-154	0-2	Hung
Today's Chanakya	30 April 2026	100±11	192 ± 11	2±2	92
CNN-News18 - VoteVibe	30 April 2026	127-147	143-163	0-6	16
Overall Average		131	157	6	26
Actual Results		80	208	6	128

Vote share projections
Polling Agency	Date Published				Lead
Polling Agency	Date Published	AITC+	BJP	Others	Lead
People's Pulse	29 April 2026	47.2%	41.5%	11.3%	5.7%
Today's Chanakya	30 April 2026	38%±3%	48%±3%	14%±3%	10%
Overall Average		42.6%	44.8%	12.7%	2.15%
Actual Results		40.96%	45.92%	12.36%	4.96%

== Voting ==
=== Vote statistics ===
According to the Election Commission of India, 70,459,284 voters were eligible to vote in the assembly elections in West Bengal. This includes 36,022,642 male, 34,435,260 female, and 1,382 third gender.

As per the Election Commission of India, a total of 9,102,577 voters were removed since October 2025 during the entire program of Special Intensive Revision, shrinking total eligible voters by 11.88% to 67,534,952 compared to 76,637,529 in October 2025. After addition through additional supplementary lists, the final voter count stood at 68,251,008.

The second and final phase of voting across 142 constituencies concluded on 29 April 2026, with the Election Commission deploying over 350,000 security personnel statewide — including the National Investigation Agency for the first time in a state election — amid reports of localised violence in Howrah and Hooghly districts. There were 85,379 polling booths and about 4.5 lakh polling officers involved in the election.

=== Voting turnout ===
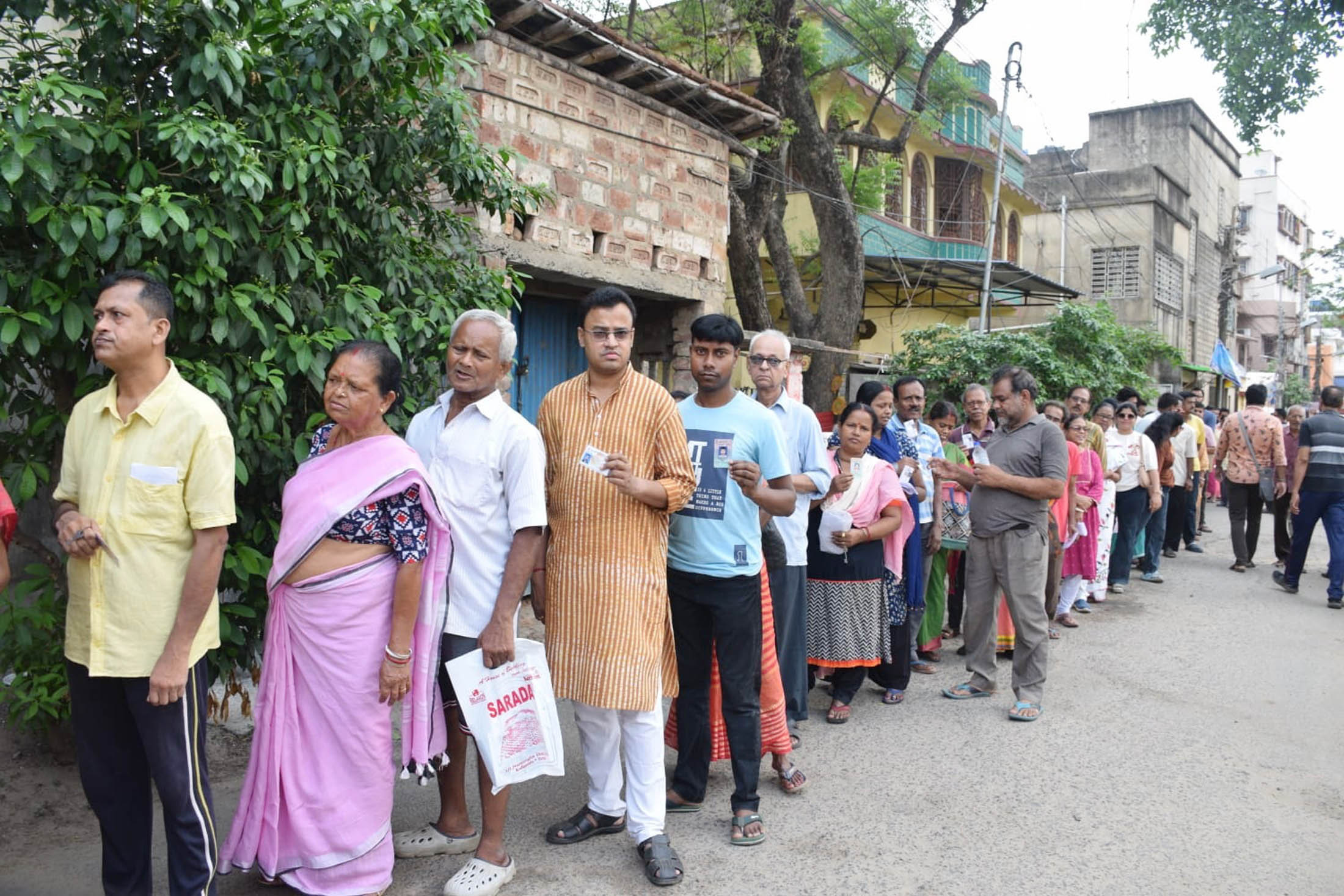
Voter queue outside a booth in Howrah district

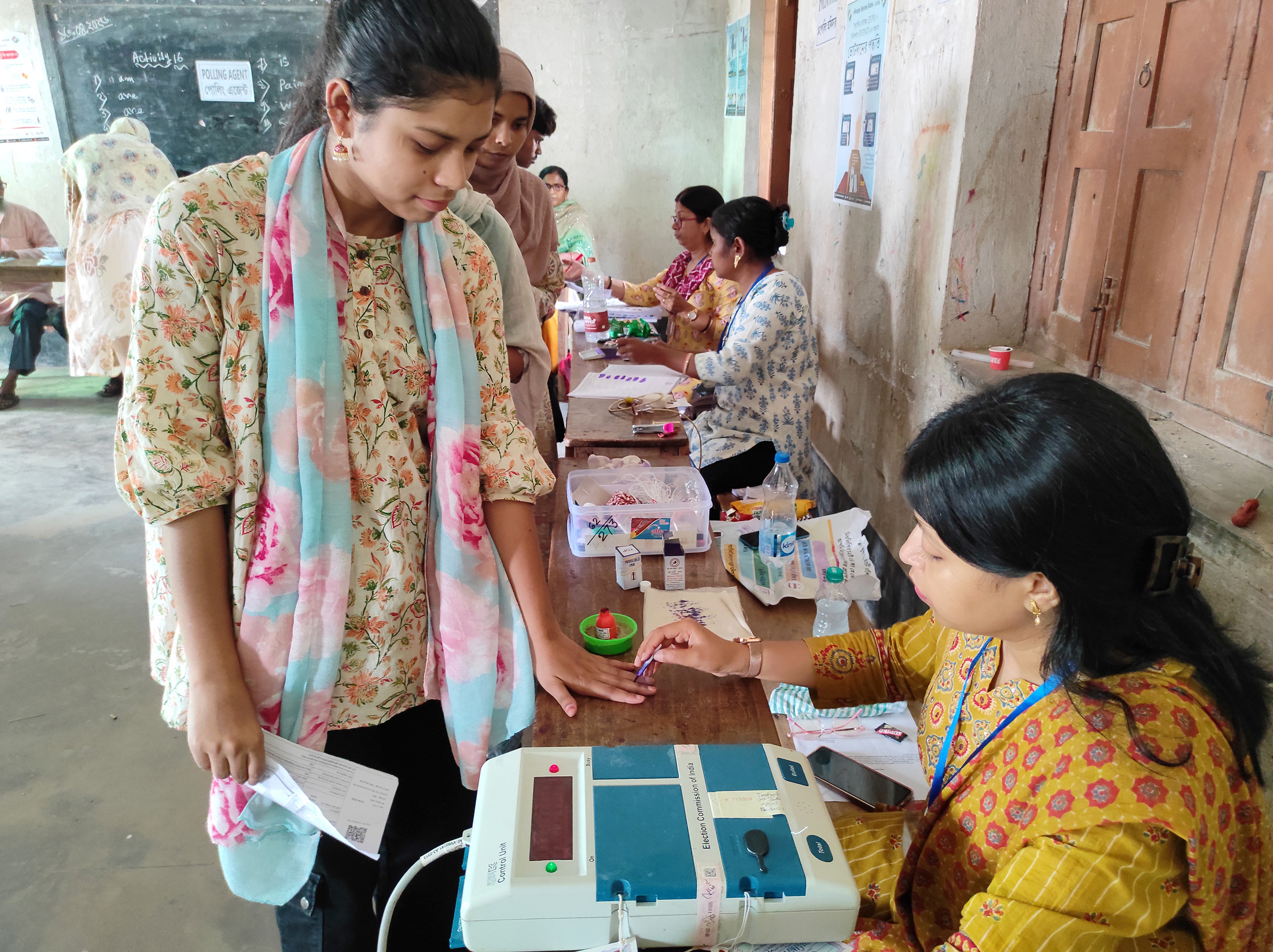
Voting procedures inside a polling booth in Murshidabad district

A huge and historic voter turnout of about 93% was recorded in the state, surpassing the previous record of 84% in 2011 assembly, when the 34 year rule of the Left Front fell to TMC. Over 6.3 crore votes were cast, at least 30 lakh more than the previous assembly and parliamentary elections in 2021 and 2024 respectively, in spite of a decrease of near 11% in voter list. Analysts cite the high voter turnout mainly due to the following possibilities:

- The conduction of SIR in the state before the election, removed about 60 lakh ASDD (Absent, Shifted, Dead and Duplicate) voter entries leading to reduced total voters and a high turnout.
- Due to high deletion in the voter list, voters have felt importance to cast vote and use their democratic rights. Some, especially Muslims and Bangladeshi refugees, feared if they don't, it may create problems in their future voting rights, further leading to cancellation of other government facilities or even citizenship.
- Media reported high numbers of migrant labours coming from other states for the election. Upon one viral video from Gujarat, TMC accused BJP of breaching Election code by arranging train tickets and foods to migrant voters of Bengal working in other states, who were returning to the state in order to vote.
- Possibilities of potential anti-incumbency like the previous 2011 election and a general trend all over the world during ruling party change in elections. This turned out to be true after the results.
- In urban centres, mainly Kolkata metropolis, the usual low turnout trend changed. One of the main reason of this change was setting up of new booths in high rises and housing complexes. The residents, especially aged persons, felt excitement, ease and comfort in that while avoiding possibilities of poll violence outside. In previous elections, there were cases of such high rises and complexes being locked up by mobs linked to the ruling party TMC, during the elections. Such cases done by the ruling party, had been observed since the left era. TMC continuously opposed setting up of such booths by ECI.

==== Voting turnout by phase ====
Phase	Gender	Turnout	
Phase 1	Male	92.33%	93.19%
Phase 1	Female	94.09%	93.19%
Phase 1	3rd Gender	94.62%	93.19%
Phase 2	Male	91.07%	92.67%
Phase 2	Female	92.28%	92.67%
Phase 2	3rd Gender	91.28%	92.67%
Total		92.93%	

==== Voting turnout by district ====
Phase	District	Seats		Turnout	
Phase 1	Cooch Behar	9	152	96.04%	93.19%
Phase 1	Alipurduar	5	152	93.20%	93.19%
Phase 1	Jalpaiguri	7	152	94.76%	93.19%
Phase 1	Kalimpong	1	152	83.04%	93.19%
Phase 1	Darjeeling	5	152	88.98%	93.19%
Phase 1	Uttar Dinajpur	9	152	94.16%	93.19%
Phase 1	Dakshin Dinajpur	6	152	95.44%	93.19%
Phase 1	Malda	12	152	94.79%	93.19%
Phase 1	Murshidabad	22	152	93.67%	93.19%
Phase 1	Purba Medinipur	16	152	92.75%	93.19%
Phase 1	Paschim Medinipur	15	152	92.19%	93.19%
Phase 1	Jhargram	4	152	92.26%	93.19%
Phase 1	Purulia	9	152	91.59%	93.19%
Phase 1	Bankura	12	152	92.55%	93.19%
Phase 1	Paschim Bardhaman	9	152	90.32%	93.19%
Phase 1	Birbhum	11	152	94.51%	93.19%
Phase 2	Nadia	17	142	92.14%	92.67%
Phase 2	North 24 Parganas	33	142	92.92%	92.67%
Phase 2	South 24 Parganas	31	142	93.48%	92.67%
Phase 2	Kolkata	11	142	88.60%	92.67%
Phase 2	Howrah	16	142	92.59%	92.67%
Phase 2	Hooghly	18	142	91.98%	92.67%
Phase 2	Purba Bardhaman	16	142	93.83%	92.67%
Total		294		92.93%	

=== Repoll ===
After receiving complaints about obstructing EVM buttons of opposition candidates with tapes, bubble gums or inking the BJP candidates' name and symbol by TMC cadre, the ECI took steps to verify these claims. Such cases were also observed in last general election in 2024. After verifying these cases, the ECI decided to do repoll in 15 booths of two assembly constituencies: 11 in Magrahat Paschim and 4 in Diamond Harbour on 2 May 2026. Beside that, due to heavy breaching in election procedures and EVM tampering, the whole assembly constituency of Falta was scheduled to be repolled.

The alleged EVM tampering by done at the directions of TMC candidate Jahangir Khan, and the entire assembly constituency was scheduled for repolling on 21 May, with counting and results on 24 May.

The BJP won a landslide victory in Falta assembly repoll with a margin exceeding 1 Lakh, highest in the state.

== Results ==
The votes were counted and results were announced on 4 May 2026. There were 77 counting centres across the state.

208	80	2	2	1	1
BJP	AITC	INC	AJUP	AISF	CPI(M)

Vote share by alliance
1. BJP (45.9%)
2. AITC+ (41.0%)
3. LF+ (6.77%)
4. INC (2.96%)
5. AJUP (0.74%)
6. SUCI(C) (0.25%)
7. NOTA (0.77%)
8. Others (1.93%)

Seat share by alliance
1. BJP (70.7%)
2. AITC+ (27.2%)
3. LF+ (0.68%)
4. INC (0.68%)
5. AJUP (0.68%)

=== Results by alliance or party ===
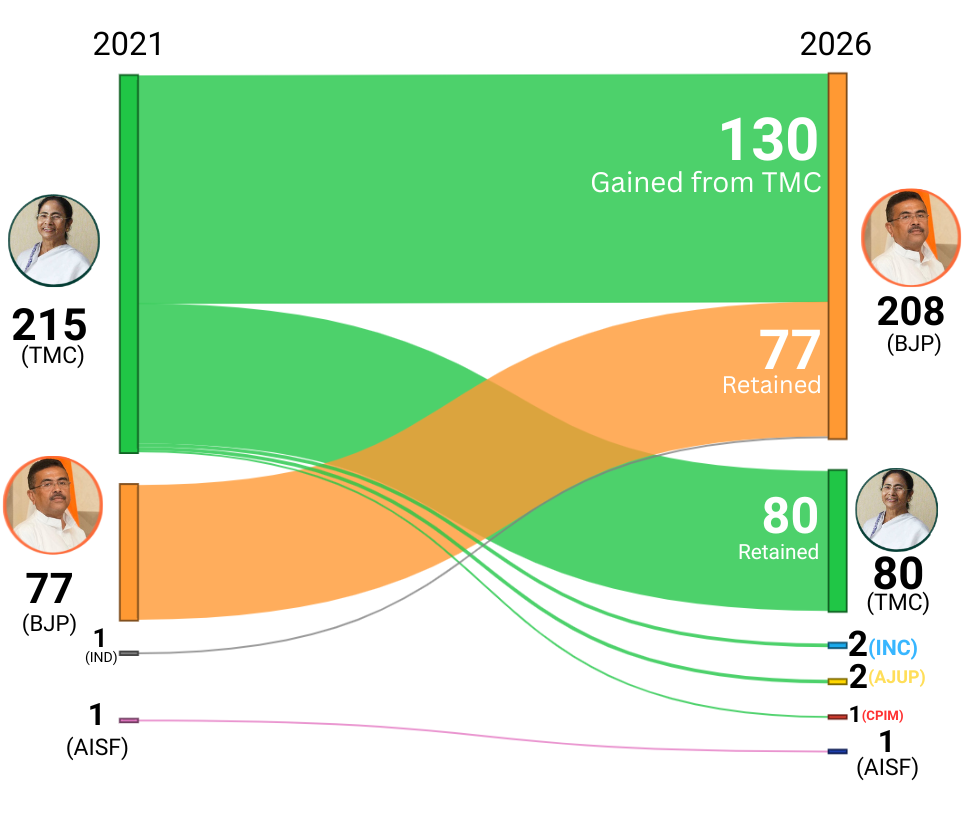
Seats Shifted in West Bengal

Alliance/ Party		Popular vote			Seats		
Alliance/ Party		Votes	%	±pp	Contested	Won	+/-
BJP		29,374,470	45.92	▲7.95	294	208	▲131
AITC+	AITC	26,021,160	40.68	▼7.34	291	80	▼135
AITC+	BGPM	176,716	0.28	New	3	0	New
Total		26,197,876	40.96	▼7.5	294	80	▼135
LF+	CPI(M)	2,879,712	4.50	▼0.23	197	1	▲1
LF+	AISF	972,280	1.52	▲0.16	30	1	Steady
LF+	AIFB	176,980	0.28	▼0.25	24	0	Steady
LF+	CPI	99,223	0.16	▼0.04	17	0	Steady
LF+	RSP	64,209	0.10	▼0.11	18	0	Steady
LF+	CPI(ML)L	46,399	0.07		10	0	Steady
LF+	SDPI	42,389	0.07		1	0	Steady
LF+	WBSP	748	0.00		1	0	Steady
LF+	IND	48,635	0.08		1	0	Steady
Total		4,330,575	6.77	▼0.34	293+6	2	▲1
INC		1,894,984	2.96	▲0.03	293	2	▲2
AJUP		470,649	0.74	New	115	2	New
SUCI(C)		162,529	0.25		229	0	
Other parties		298,212	0.47		380	0	▼1
IND		731,705	1.15		1022	0	Steady
NOTA		495,568	0.77	▲0.2			
Total		63,963,262	100	—	2926	294	—

=== Results by phase ===
Phase	Seats			
Phase	Seats	BJP	AITC	OTH
Phase 1	152	116	31	5
Phase 2	142	92	49	1
Total	294	208	80	6

=== Results by division ===
Division	Seats			
Division	Seats	BJP	AITC	OTH
Jalpaiguri division	27	26	1	0
Malda division	49	22	22	5
Burdwan division	54	45	9	0
Medinipur division	56	54	2	0
Presidency division	108	61	46	1
Total Seats	294	208	80	6

=== Results by reservation category ===
Category	Seats			
Category	Seats	BJP	AITC	Others
Scheduled Castes	68	51	17	0
Scheduled Tribes	16	16	0	0
Unreserved	209	141	63	6
Total	294	208	80	6

=== Results by region ===
Region	District	Seats						
Region	District	Seats	BJP		AITC		Others	
Region	District	Seats	Won	+/-	Won	+/-	Won	+/-
Uttar Banga	Cooch Behar	9	8	▲1	1	▼1	0	Steady
Uttar Banga	Alipurduar	5	5	Steady	0	Steady	0	Steady
Uttar Banga	Jalpaiguri	7	7	▲3	0	▼3	0	Steady
Uttar Banga	Kalimpong	1	1	▲1	0	▼1	0	Steady
Uttar Banga	Darjeeling	5	5	Steady	0	Steady	0	Steady
Uttar Banga	Uttar Dinajpur	9	4	▲2	5	▼2	0	Steady
Uttar Banga	Dakshin Dinajpur	6	4	▲1	2	▼1	0	Steady
Uttar Banga	Malda	12	6	▲2	6	▼2	0	Steady
Total		54	40	▲10	14	▼10	0	Steady
Dakshin Banga	Murshidabad	22	8	▲6	9	▼11	5	▲5
Dakshin Banga	Nadia	17	14	▲5	3	▼5	0	Steady
Dakshin Banga	North 24 Parganas	33	23	▲18	10	▼18	0	Steady
Dakshin Banga	South 24 Parganas	31	11	▲11	19	▼11	1	Steady
Dakshin Banga	Kolkata	11	6	▲6	5	▼6	0	Steady
Dakshin Banga	Howrah	16	7	▲7	9	▼7	0	Steady
Dakshin Banga	Hooghly	18	16	▲12	2	▼12	0	Steady
Dakshin Banga	Purba Medinipur	16	16	▲9	0	▼9	0	Steady
Dakshin Banga	Paschim Medinipur	15	13	▲11	2	▼11	0	Steady
Dakshin Banga	Jhargram	4	4	▲4	0	▼4	0	Steady
Total		183	117	▲89	59	▼94	6	▲5
Rarh Banga	Purulia	9	9	▲3	0	▼3	0	Steady
Rarh Banga	Bankura	12	12	▲4	0	▼4	0	Steady
Rarh Banga	Purba Bardhaman	16	14	▲14	2	▼14	0	Steady
Rarh Banga	Paschim Bardhaman	9	9	▲6	0	▼6	0	Steady
Rarh Banga	Birbhum	11	6	▲5	5	▼5	0	Steady
Total		57	50	▲32	7	▼32	0	Steady
Total		294	208	▲131	80	▼136	6	▲5

=== Results by constituency ===
District	Constituency		Winner				Runner Up				Margin	%
District	#	Name	Candidate	Party	Votes	%	Candidate	Party	Votes	%	Margin	%
Cooch Behar	1	Mekliganj (SC)	Dadhiram Ray	BJP	1,19,109	54.42	Paresh Adhikary	AITC	89,525	40.91	29,584	13.51
Cooch Behar	2	Mathabhanga (SC)	Nisith Pramanik	BJP	1,43,340	59.27	Sablu Barman	AITC	86,250	35.66	57,090	23.61
Cooch Behar	3	Cooch Behar Uttar (SC)	Sukumar Ray	BJP	1,55,327	61.11	Partha Pratim Roy	AITC	84,943	33.42	70,384	27.69
Cooch Behar	4	Cooch Behar Dakshin	Rathindra Bose	BJP	1,08,482	52.75	Avijit De Bhowmik	AITC	84,237	41.53	22,747	11.22
Cooch Behar	5	Sitalkuchi (SC)	Sabitri Barman	BJP	1,44,367	51.59	Harihar Das	AITC	1,19,089	42.56	25,278	9.03
Cooch Behar	6	Sitai (SC)	Sangita Roy	AITC	1,28,188	48.31	Ashutosh Barma	BJP	1,25,467	47.29	2,721	1.02
Cooch Behar	7	Dinhata	Ajay Ray	BJP	1,38,255	51.60	Udayan Guha	AITC	1,20,808	45.09	17,447	6.51
Cooch Behar	8	Natabari	Girija Shankar Ray	BJP	1,26,911	54.53	Sailendra Nath Barma	AITC	92,298	39.66	34,613	14.87
Cooch Behar	9	Tufanganj	Malati Rava Roy	BJP	1,22,525	53.08	Shibshankar Paul	AITC	96,068	41.62	26,457	11.46
Alipurduar	10	Kumargram (ST)	Manoj Kumar Oraon	BJP	1,43,044	57.95	Rajeev Tirkey	AITC	90,167	36.53	52,877	21.42
Alipurduar	11	Kalchini (ST)	Bishal Lama	BJP	1,14,759	56.64	Birendra Bara	AITC	76,916	37.96	37,843	18.68
Alipurduar	12	Alipurduars	Paritosh Das	BJP	1,43,242	61.62	Suman Kanjilal	AITC	72,822	31.33	70,420	30.29
Alipurduar	13	Falakata	Dipak Barman	BJP	1,34,370	56.95	Subhash Chandra Roy	AITC	88,371	37.45	45,999	19.5
Alipurduar	14	Madarihat	Laxuman Limbu	BJP	1,02,488	57.98	Jay Prakash Toppo	AITC	61,578	34.84	40,910	23.14
Jalpaiguri	15	Dhupguri (SC)	Naresh Roy	BJP	1,34,798	54.25	Nirmal Chandra Roy	AITC	96,248	38.73	38,550	15.52
Jalpaiguri	16	Maynaguri (SC)	Dalim Chandra Roy	BJP	1,47,403	58.62	Rammohan Ray	AITC	90,900	36.15	56,503	22.47
Jalpaiguri	17	Jalpaiguri (SC)	Ananta Deb Adhikary	BJP	1,42,987	60.11	Krishna Das	AITC	74,182	31.19	68,805	28.92
Jalpaiguri	18	Rajganj (SC)	Dinesh Sarkar	BJP	1,14,657	51.10	Swapna Barman	AITC	93,180	41.53	21,477	9.57
Jalpaiguri	19	Dabgram-Phulbari	Sikha Chatterjee	BJP	1,66,300	66.02	Ranjan Shil Sharma	AITC	68,585	27.23	97,715	38.79
Jalpaiguri	20	Mal (ST)	Sukra Munda	BJP	1,12,095	49.94	Bulu Chik Baraik	AITC	96,603	43.04	15,492	6.90
Jalpaiguri	21	Nagrakata (ST)	Puna Bhengra	BJP	1,03,478	50.73	Sanjay Kujur	AITC	77,620	38.06	25,858	12.67
Kalimpong	22	Kalimpong	Bharat Kumar Chetri	BJP	84,290	49.74	Ruden Sada Lepcha	BGPM	62,826	37.07	21,464	12.67
Darjeeling	23	Darjeeling	Noman Rai	BJP	62,076	35.72	Bijoy Kumar Rai	BGPM	56,019	32.23	6,057	3.49
Darjeeling	24	Kurseong	Sonam Lama	BJP	74,878	41.18	Amar Lama	BGPM	57,871	31.83	17,007	9.35
Darjeeling	25	Matigara-Naxalbari (SC)	Anandamoy Barman	BJP	1,66,905	66.50	Sankar Malakar	AITC	62,640	24.96	1,04,265	41.54
Darjeeling	26	Siliguri	Shankar Ghosh	BJP	1,20,760	65.78	Goutam Deb	AITC	47,568	25.91	73,192	39.87
Darjeeling	27	Phansidewa (ST)	Durga Murmu	BJP	1,18,241	56.92	Reena Toppo Ekka	AITC	72,978	35.13	45,263	21.79
Uttar Dinajpur	28	Chopra	Hamidul Rahaman	AITC	1,20,986	57.30	Shankar Adhikari	BJP	51,862	24.56	69,124	32.74
Uttar Dinajpur	29	Islampur	Kanaia Lal Agarwal	AITC	1,08,117	58.14	Chitrajit Roy	BJP	68,054	36.60	40,063	21.54
Uttar Dinajpur	30	Goalpokhar	Md. Ghulam Rabbani	AITC	1,22,105	66.66	Sarajit Biswas	BJP	38,315	20.92	83,790	45.74
Uttar Dinajpur	31	Chakulia	Minhajul Arfin Azad	AITC	90,277	45.34	Manoj Kumar Jain	BJP	62,266	31.27	28,011	14.07
Uttar Dinajpur	32	Karandighi	Biraj Biswas	BJP	96,260	43.76	Goutam Paul	AITC	76,391	34.73	19,869	9.03
Uttar Dinajpur	33	Hemtabad (SC)	Haripada Barman	BJP	1,15,529	48.26	Satyajit Barman	AITC	1,03,168	43.10	12,361	5.16
Uttar Dinajpur	34	Kaliaganj (SC)	Utpal Brahmacharo	BJP	1,58,349	61.32	Nitai Baishya	AITC	81,924	31.73	76,425	29.59
Uttar Dinajpur	35	Raiganj	Koushik Chowdhury	BJP	1,05,561	63.69	Krishna Kalyani	AITC	46,828	28.54	58,641	35.58
Uttar Dinajpur	36	Itahar	Mosaraf Hussen	AITC	98,172	48.09	Sabita Barman	BJP	70,294	34.43	27,878	13.66
Dakshin Dinajpur	37	Kushmandi (SC)	Tapas Chandra Roy	BJP	97,437	48.83	Rekha Roy	AITC	88,374	44.29	9,063	4.54
Dakshin Dinajpur	38	Kumarganj	Toraf Hossain Mandal	AITC	82,791	47.62	Subhendu Sarkar	BJP	76,106	43.77	6,685	3.85
Dakshin Dinajpur	39	Balurghat	Bidyut Kumar Roy	BJP	95,697	60.45	Arpita Ghosh	AITC	48,121	30.40	47,576	30.05
Dakshin Dinajpur	40	Tapan (ST)	Budhrai Tudu	BJP	1,05,780	56.66	Chintamoni Biha	AITC	68,793	36.85	36,987	19.81
Dakshin Dinajpur	41	Gangarampur (SC)	Satyendra Nath Roy	BJP	1,05,083	54.50	Goutam Das	AITC	76,744	39.80	28,339	14.7
Dakshin Dinajpur	42	Harirampur	Biplab Mitra	AITC	93,098	45.62	Debabrata Majumder	BJP	91,112	44.65	1,986	0.97
Malda	43	Habibpur (ST)	Joyel Murmu	BJP	1,42,062	62.41	Amal Kisku	AITC	63,874	28.06	78,188	34.35
Malda	44	Gazole (SC)	Chinmoy Deb Barman	BJP	1,31,541	53.94	Prasenjit Das	AITC	93,349	38.28	38,192	15.66
Malda	45	Chanchal	Prasun Banerjee	AITC	1,28,014	54.61	Ratan Das	BJP	64,140	27.36	63,874	27.25
Malda	46	Harishchandrapur	Md. Matibur Rahaman	AITC	1,13,104	49.80	Ratan Das	BJP	64,833	28.55	48,271	21.25
Malda	47	Malatipur	Abdur Rahim Boxi	AITC	1,04,123	51.54	Mausam Noor	INC	44,376	21.96	59,747	29.58
Malda	48	Ratua	Samar Mukherjee	AITC	1,06,834	45.82	Abhishek Singhania	BJP	74,272	31.86	32,562	13.96
Malda	49	Manikchak	Gour Chandra Mandal	BJP	1,10,118	48.86	Kabita Mandal	AITC	96,180	42.68	38,192	6.18
Malda	50	Maldaha	Gopal Chandra Saha	BJP	1,23,656	56.00	Lipika Barman Ghosh	AITC	73,528	33.30	50,128	22.70
Malda	51	English Bazar	Amlan Bhaduri	BJP	1,54,096	65.70	Asis Kundu	AITC	60,312	25.71	93,784	39.99
Malda	52	Mothabari	Md. Najrul Islam	AITC	65,705	40.51	Nibaran Ghosh	BJP	55,209	34.04	10,496	6.47
Malda	53	Sujapur	Sabina Yeasmin	AITC	1,12,795	49.66	Md. Abdul Hannan	INC	52,508	23.12	60,287	26.54
Malda	54	Baisnabnagar	Raju Karmakar	BJP	1,08,692	48.34	Chandana Sarkar	AITC	61,811	27.49	46,881	20.85
Murshidabad	55	Farakka	Motab Shaikh	INC	63,050	36.06	Sunil Chowdhuri	BJP	54,857	31.38	8,193	4.68
Murshidabad	56	Samserganj	Mohammad Noor Alam	AITC	61,918	39.84	Nazme Alam	INC	54,331	34.96	7,587	4.88
Murshidabad	57	Suti	Emani Biswas	AITC	81,330	36.83	Mahabir Ghosh	BJP	68,973	31.23	12,357	5.60
Murshidabad	58	Jangipur	Chitta Mukherjee	BJP	91,201	42.90	Jakir Hossain	AITC	80,659	37.94	10,542	4.96
Murshidabad	59	Raghunathganj	Akhruzzaman	AITC	88,909	45.65	Nasir Saikh	INC	43,854	24.83	40,555	20.82
Murshidabad	60	Sagardighi	Bayron Biswas	AITC	90,781	43.72	Tapas Kumar Chakraborty	BJP	56,521	27.22	34,260	16.50
Murshidabad	61	Lalgola	Abdul Aziz Doctor	AITC	67,954	37.72	Md. Touhidur Rahaman	INC	48,994	27.19	18,960	10.53
Murshidabad	62	Bhagabangola	Reyat Hossain Sarkar	AITC	1,05,997	48.57	Mahmudal Hassan	CPI(M)	49,590	22.73	56,407	25.84
Murshidabad	63	Raninagar	Julfikar Ali	INC	79,423	33.48	Abdul Soumik Hossain	AITC	76,722	32.34	2,701	1.14
Murshidabad	64	Murshidabad	Gouri Shankar Ghosh	BJP	1,14,443	48.18	Shaoni Singha Roy	AITC	82,922	34.91	31,521	13.27
Murshidabad	65	Nabagram (SC)	Dilip Saha	BJP	78,739	35.54	Pronab Chandra Das	AITC	72,820	32.86	5,919	2.68
Murshidabad	66	Khargram (SC)	Mitali Mal	BJP	77,748	38.02	Ashis Marjit	AITC	68,415	33.46	9,333	4.56
Murshidabad	67	Burwan (SC)	Sukhen Kumar Bagdi	BJP	91,661	48.52	Protima Rajak	AITC	69,361	36.72	22,300	21.80
Murshidabad	68	Kandi	Gargi Das Ghosh	BJP	73,355	36.78	Apurba Sarkar	AITC	63,020	31.60	10,335	5.18
Murshidabad	69	Bharatpur	Mustafizur Rahaman	AITC	90,870	42.38	Anamika Ghosh	BJP	60,117	28.04	30,753	14.34
Murshidabad	70	Rejinagar	Humayun Kabir	AJUP	1,23,536	51.62	Bapan Ghosh	BJP	64,660	27.02	58,876	24.60
Murshidabad	71	Beldanga	Bharat Kumar Jhawar	BJP	72,872	31.88	Rabiul Alam Chowdhury	AITC	59,664	26.10	13,208	5.78
Murshidabad	72	Baharampur	Subrata Maitra	BJP	91,088	40.62	Adhir Ranjan Chowdhury	INC	73,540	32.79	17,548	7.83
Murshidabad	73	Hariharpara	Niamot Sheikh	AITC	80,338	34.14	Bijoy Sekh	AJUP	67,673	28.76	12,665	5.38
Murshidabad	74	Naoda	Humayun Kabir	AJUP	86,463	39.02	Rana Mondal	BJP	58,520	26.41	27,943	12.61
Murshidabad	75	Domkal	Md. Mostafijur Rahaman	CPI(M)	1,07,882	41.85	Humayun Kabir	AITC	91,586	35.53	16,296	6.32
Murshidabad	76	Jalangi	Babar Ali	AITC	88,684	35.01	Ianus Ali Sarkar	CPI(M)	67,168	26.52	21,516	8.49
Nadia	77	Karimpur	Samarendranath Ghosh	BJP	1,05,234	43.68	Soham Chakraborty	AITC	95,049	39.45	10,185	4.23
Nadia	78	Tehatta	Subrata Kabiraj	BJP	1,12,138	48.01	Dilip Kumar Poddar	AITC	83,885	35.91	28,253	12.10
Nadia	79	Palashipara	Rukbanur Rahman	AITC	89,241	41.58	Anima Dutta	BJP	77,187	36.24	11,454	5.34
Nadia	80	Kaliganj	Alifa Ahmed	AITC	89,292	40.77	Bapan Ghosh	BJP	79,120	36.12	10,172	4.65
Nadia	81	Nakashipara	Santanu Dey	BJP	1,00,600	48.85	Kallol Khan	AITC	83,273	40.44	17,327	8.41
Nadia	82	Chapra	Jeber Sekh	AITC	97,085	46.06	Saikat Sarkar	BJP	66,305	31.46	30,780	14.60
Nadia	83	Krishnanagar Uttar	Tarak Nath Chatterjee	BJP	1,33,211	65.93	Somnath Dutta	AITC	54,850	27.15	78,361	38.78
Nadia	84	Nabadwip	Srutisekhar Goswami	BJP	1,08,631	49.79	Pundarikakshya Saha	AITC	87,187	39.96	21,444	9.83
Nadia	85	Krishnanagar Dakshin	Sadhan Ghosh	BJP	1,02,862	52.19	Ujjal Biswas	AITC	75,061	38.09	27,801	14.10
Nadia	86	Santipur	Swapan Kumar Das	BJP	1,17,941	54.86	Braja Kishore Goswami	AITC	72,565	33.76	45,376	21.10
Nadia	87	Ranaghat Uttar Paschim	Parthasarathi Chatterjee	BJP	1,29,046	59.43	Tapas Kumar Ghosh	AITC	71,495	32.93	57,551	26.50
Nadia	88	Krishnaganj (SC)	Sukanta Biswas	BJP	1,39,838	60.15	Samir Kumar Poddar	AITC	78,939	33.96	60,899	26.19
Nadia	89	Ranaghat Uttar Purba (SC)	Ashim Biswas	BJP	1,26,235	59.71	Barnali Dey Roy	AITC	74,492	35.24	51,743	24.47
Nadia	90	Ranaghat Dakshin (SC)	Ashim Kumar Biswas	BJP	1,40,010	60.17	Sougata Kumar Burman	AITC	75,546	32.47	64,464	27.70
Nadia	91	Chakdaha	Bankim Chandra Ghosh	BJP	1,15,433	54.78	Subhankar Singha	AITC	78,488	37.25	36,945	17.53
Nadia	92	Kalyani (SC)	Anupam Biswas	BJP	1,14,469	53.12	Atindra Nath Mondal	AITC	79,677	36.97	34,792	16.15
Nadia	93	Haringhata (SC)	Asim Kumar Sarkar	BJP	1,07,900	50.72	Rajib Biswas	AITC	85,845	40.35	22,055	10.37
North 24 Parganas	94	Bagdah (SC)	Soma Thakur	BJP	1,21,307	55.84	Madhuparna Thakur	AITC	86,691	39.91	34,616	15.93
North 24 Parganas	95	Bangaon Uttar (SC)	Ashok Kirtania	BJP	1,19,317	56.46	Biswajit Das	AITC	78,647	37.21	40,670	19.25
North 24 Parganas	96	Bangaon Dakshin (SC)	Swapan Majumder	BJP	1,19,399	56.27	Rituparna Addhya	AITC	81,585	38.45	37,814	17.82
North 24 Parganas	97	Gaighata (SC)	Subrata Thakur	BJP	1,21,322	57.99	Narottam Biswas	AITC	73,639	35.20	47,683	22.79
North 24 Parganas	98	Swarupnagar (SC)	Bina Mondal	AITC	94,813	43.47	Tarak Saha	BJP	78,796	36.13	16,017	7.34
North 24 Parganas	99	Baduria	Burhanul Mokaddin	AITC	1,03,334	45.45	Sukriti Kumar Sarkar	BJP	63,273	27.83	40,061	17.62
North 24 Parganas	100	Habra	Debdas Mondal	BJP	1,04,645	52.66	Jyotipriya Mallick	AITC	73,183	36.82	31,462	15.84
North 24 Parganas	101	Ashoknagar	Dr. Sumay Hira	BJP	96,807	44.05	Narayan Goswami	AITC	87,399	39.77	9,408	4.28
North 24 Parganas	102	Amdanga	Mohammad Kasem Siddique	AITC	81,670	38.25	Arindam Dey	BJP	78,675	36.85	2,995	1.40
North 24 Parganas	103	Bijpur	Sudipta Das	BJP	71,799	49.56	Subodh Adhikary	AITC	58,456	40.35	13,343	9.21
North 24 Parganas	104	Naihati	Sumitro Chatterjee	BJP	77,484	49.15	Sanat Dey	AITC	67,054	42.53	10,430	6.62
North 24 Parganas	105	Bhatpara	Pawan Kumar Singh	BJP	61,683	58.02	Amit Gupta	AITC	38,876	36.57	22,807	21.45
North 24 Parganas	106	Jagatdal	Rajesh Kumar	BJP	94,351	51.50	Somenath Shyam Ichini	AITC	73,442	40.09	20,909	11.41
North 24 Parganas	107	Noapara	Arjun Singh	BJP	94,415	48.37	Trinankur Bhattacharjee	AITC	76,759	39.33	17,656	9.04
North 24 Parganas	108	Barrackpur	Kaustuv Bagchi	BJP	78,466	50.65	Raj Chakraborty	AITC	62,644	40.44	15,822	10.21
North 24 Parganas	109	Khardaha	Kalyan Chakraborti	BJP	97,752	49.75	Devadeep Purohit	AITC	73,266	37.28	24,486	12.47
North 24 Parganas	110	Dum Dum Uttar	Sourav Sikdar	BJP	1,03,284	46.24	Chandrima Bhattacharya	AITC	76,880	34.42	26,404	11.82
North 24 Parganas	111	Panihati	Ratna Debnath	BJP	87,977	50.28	Tirthankar Ghosh	AITC	59,141	33.80	28,836	16.48
North 24 Parganas	112	Kamarhati	Madan Mitra	AITC	64,817	43.71	Arup Choudhury	BJP	59,171	39.91	5,646	3.80
North 24 Parganas	113	Baranagar	Sajal Ghosh	BJP	81,730	48.26	Sayantika Banerjee	AITC	64,774	38.25	16,956	10.01
North 24 Parganas	114	Dum Dum	Arijit Bakshi	BJP	99,181	50.07	Bratya Basu	AITC	73,908	37.31	25,273	12.76
North 24 Parganas	115	Rajarhat New Town	Piyush Kanodia	BJP	1,06,564	42.19	Tapash Chatterjee	AITC	1,06,248	42.07	316	0.12
North 24 Parganas	116	Bidhannagar	Sharadwat Mukherjee	BJP	97,979	55.20	Sujit Bose	AITC	60,649	34.17	37,330	21.03
North 24 Parganas	117	Rajarhat Gopalpur	Tarunjyoti Tewari	BJP	1,01,277	51.74	Aditi Munshi	AITC	73,520	37.56	27,757	14.18
North 24 Parganas	118	Madhyamgram	Rathin Ghosh	AITC	95,995	41.21	Anindya Banerjee	BJP	93,596	40.18	2,399	1.03
North 24 Parganas	119	Barasat	Sankar Chatterjee	BJP	1,22,171	51.64	Sabyasachi Dutta	AITC	87,613	37.03	34,558	14.61
North 24 Parganas	120	Deganga	Anisur Rahaman Bidesh	AITC	1,01,114	43.31	Md Mofidul Hoque Sahaji	AISF	83,296	35.68	17,818	7.63
North 24 Parganas	121	Haroa	Abdul Matin Muhammad	AITC	1,17,591	49.52	Piyarul Islam	AISF	68,250	28.74	49,341	20.78
North 24 Parganas	122	Minakhan (SC)	Usha Rani Mondal	AITC	92,079	42.66	Rudrendra Patra	BJP	59,787	27.70	32,292	14.96
North 24 Parganas	123	Sandeshkhali (ST)	Sanat Sardar	BJP	1,07,189	49.58	Jharna Sardar	AITC	89,679	41.48	17,510	8.10
North 24 Parganas	124	Basirhat Dakshin	Surajit Mitra	AITC	1,12,965	45.09	Sourya Banerjee	BJP	1,03,421	41.28	9,544	3.81
North 24 Parganas	125	Basirhat Uttar	Md. Tauseef Rahman	AITC	1,15,503	48.42	Md. Musa Karemulla	AISF	58,233	24.41	57,270	24.01
North 24 Parganas	126	Hingalganj (SC)	Rekha Patra	BJP	1,00,207	48.39	Ananda Sarkar	AITC	94,786	45.77	5,421	2.62
South 24 Parganas	127	Gosaba (SC)	Bikarna Naskar	BJP	1,08,492	51.34	Subrata Mondal	AITC	92,392	43.72	16,100	7.62
South 24 Parganas	128	Basanti (SC)	Nilima Mistry	AITC	1,27,495	54.99	Bikash Sardar	BJP	71,314	30.76	56,181	24.23
South 24 Parganas	129	Kultali (SC)	Ganesh Chandra Mondal	AITC	1,46,435	57.75	Madhabi Mahalder	BJP	87,159	34.38	59,276	23.37
South 24 Parganas	130	Patharpratima	Samir Kumar Jana	AITC	1,17,164	47.62	Asit Kumar Haldar	BJP	1,12,291	45.64	4,873	1.98
South 24 Parganas	131	Kakdwip	Dipankar Jana	BJP	1,09,373	47.29	Manturam Pakhira	AITC	1,04,613	45.23	4,760	2.06
South 24 Parganas	132	Sagar	Sumanta Mandal	BJP	1,27,802	49.52	Bankim Chandra Hazra	AITC	1,19,921	46.46	7,881	3.06
South 24 Parganas	133	Kulpi	Barnali Dhara	AITC	91,266	43.94	Abani Naskar	BJP	80,883	38.94	10,383	5.00
South 24 Parganas	134	Raidighi	Tapas Mondal	AITC	1,18,991	46.16	Palash Rana	BJP	1,13,034	43.85	5,957	2.31
South 24 Parganas	135	Mandirbazar (SC)	Joydeb Halder	AITC	93,686	43.94	Mallika Paik	BJP	91,691	43.00	1,995	0.94
South 24 Parganas	136	Jaynagar (SC)	Biswanath Das	AITC	1,08,194	49.38	Aloke Halder	BJP	81,844	37.35	26,350	12.03
South 24 Parganas	137	Baruipur Purba (SC)	Bivas Sardar	AITC	1,20,987	50.98	Tumpa Sardar	BJP	89,172	37.57	31,815	13.41
South 24 Parganas	138	Canning Paschim (SC)	Paresh Ram Das	AITC	1,20,548	52.26	Prasanta Bayen	BJP	79,883	34.63	40,665	17.63
South 24 Parganas	139	Canning Purba	Md. Baharul Islam	AITC	1,48,687	61.53	Arabul Islam	AISF	56,733	23.48	91,954	38.05
South 24 Parganas	140	Baruipur Paschim	Biman Banerjee	AITC	1,04,781	47.41	Biswajit Paul	BJP	86,919	39.32	17,862	8.09
South 24 Parganas	141	Magrahat Purba (SC)	Sarmistha Purkait	AITC	1,08,412	48.80	Uttam Kumar Banik	BJP	76,805	34.57	31,607	14.23
South 24 Parganas	142	Magrahat Paschim	Md. Samim Ahamed Molla	AITC	1,13,834	55.43	Gour Sundar Ghosh	BJP	55,331	26.94	58,503	28.49
South 24 Parganas	143	Diamond Harbour	Pannalal Halder	AITC	1,19,320	51.38	Dipak Kumar Halder	BJP	88,054	37.92	31,266	13.46
South 24 Parganas	144	Falta	Debangshu Panda	BJP	1,49,666	71.20	Sambhu Nath Kurmi	CPI(M)	40,645	19.34	1,09,021	51.86
South 24 Parganas	145	Satgachhia	Agniswar Naskar	BJP	1,11,023	46.38	Somashree Betal	AITC	1,10,622	46.21	401	0.17
South 24 Parganas	146	Bishnupur (SC)	Dilip Mondal	AITC	1,32,647	52.93	Abhijit Sardar	BJP	95,722	38.20	36,925	14.73
South 24 Parganas	147	Sonarpur Dakshin	Roopa Ganguly	BJP	1,28,970	52.34	Arundhuti Maitra	AITC	93,188	37.82	35,782	14.52
South 24 Parganas	148	Bhangar	Naushad Siddiqui	AISF	1,26,555	47.33	Saokat Molla	AITC	94,467	35.33	32,088	12.00
South 24 Parganas	149	Kasba	Javed Ahmed Khan	AITC	1,17,893	48.88	Sandeep Banerjee	BJP	96,919	40.18	20,974	8.70
South 24 Parganas	150	Jadavpur	Sarbori Mukherjee	BJP	1,06,199	45.96	Debabrata Majumdar	AITC	78,483	33.96	27,716	12.00
South 24 Parganas	151	Sonarpur Uttar	Debasish Dhar	BJP	1,19,824	46.73	Firdousi Begum	AITC	1,10,017	42.90	9,807	3.83
South 24 Parganas	152	Tollygunge	Papiya Adhikari	BJP	88,407	42.99	Aroop Biswas	AITC	82,394	40.06	6,013	2.93
South 24 Parganas	153	Behala Purba	Sankar Sikder	BJP	1,15,502	49.22	Subhasish Chakraborty	AITC	90,365	38.50	25,137	10.72
South 24 Parganas	154	Behala Paschim	Indranil Khan	BJP	1,13,502	47.39	Ratna Chatterjee	AITC	88,472	37.05	24,699	10.34
South 24 Parganas	155	Maheshtala	Subhasis Das	AITC	1,16,811	50.83	Tamanath Bhowmick	BJP	83,898	36.51	32,913	14.32
South 24 Parganas	156	Budge Budge	Ashok Kumar Deb	AITC	1,27,091	58.27	Tarun Kumar Adak	BJP	80,241	36.79	46,850	21.48
South 24 Parganas	157	Metiaburuz	Abdul Khaleque Molla	AITC	1,24,230	68.99	Veer Bahadur Singh	BJP	36,351	20.19	87,879	48.80
Kolkata	158	Kolkata Port	Firhad Hakim	AITC	1,01,266	65.43	Rakesh Singh	BJP	45,146	29.18	56,080	36.25
Kolkata	159	Bhabanipur	Suvendu Adhikari	BJP	73,917	53.02	Mamata Banerjee	AITC	58,812	42.19	15,105	10.83
Kolkata	160	Rashbehari	Swapan Dasgupta	BJP	74,123	53.39	Debasish Kumar	AITC	53,258	38.36	20,865	15.03
Kolkata	161	Ballygunge	Sovandeb Chattopadhyay	AITC	1,08,481	64.81	Shatarupa	BJP	47,005	28.08	61,476	36.73
Kolkata	162	Chowrangee	Nayna Bandyopadhyay	AITC	62,938	57.15	Santosh Pathak	BJP	40,936	37.17	22,002	19.98
Kolkata	163	Entally	Sandipan Saha	AITC	94,427	57.16	Priyanka Tibrewal	BJP	60,421	36.57	34,006	20.59
Kolkata	164	Beleghata	Kunal Ghosh	AITC	93,757	53.85	Partha Chaudhury	BJP	65,181	37.44	28,576	16.41
Kolkata	165	Jorasanko	Vijay Ojha	BJP	52,668	49.48	Vijay Upadhyay	AITC	47,071	44.05	5,797	5.43
Kolkata	166	Shyampukur	Purnima Chakraborty	BJP	60,248	51.60	Shashi Panja	AITC	45,615	39.06	14,633	12.54
Kolkata	167	Maniktala	Tapas Roy	BJP	76,370	50.67	Shreya Pandey	AITC	60,726	40.29	15,644	10.38
Kolkata	168	Kashipur-Belgachhia	Ritesh Tiwari	BJP	68,368	45.41	Atin Ghosh	AITC	66,717	44.32	1,651	1.09
Howrah	169	Bally	Sanjay Kumar Singh	BJP	57,639	48.91	Kailash Kumar Mishra	AITC	45,642	38.73	11,997	10.81
Howrah	170	Howrah Uttar	Umesh Rai	BJP	67,539	50.76	Gautam Chowdhuri	AITC	56,289	42.30	11,250	8.46
Howrah	171	Howrah Madhya	Arup Roy	AITC	95,948	49.60	Biplab Kumar Mondal	BJP	79,865	41.28	16,083	8.32
Howrah	172	Shibpur	Rudranil Ghosh	BJP	89,615	49.42	Rana Chatterjee	AITC	73,557	40.57	16,058	8.85
Howrah	173	Howrah Dakshin	Nandita Chowdhury	AITC	1,00,540	45.28	Shyamal Kumar Hati	BJP	92,712	41.75	7,828	3.53
Howrah	174	Sankrail (SC)	Priya Paul	AITC	1,05,412	45.99	Barnali Dhali Naskar	BJP	88,672	38.69	16,740	7.30
Howrah	175	Panchla	Gulsan Mullick	AITC	1,23,967	52.72	Ranjan Paul	BJP	85,647	36.42	38,320	16.30
Howrah	176	Uluberia Purba	Ritabrata Banerjee	AITC	95,633	45.97	Rudra Prasad Banerjee	BJP	83,795	40.28	11,838	5.69
Howrah	177	Uluberia Uttar (SC)	Chiran Bera	BJP	93,320	45.87	Bimal Kumar Das	AITC	89,143	43.81	4,177	2.06
Howrah	178	Uluberia Dakshin	Pulak Roy	AITC	1,09,649	48.46	Swami Mangalanand Puri	BJP	92,462	40.86	17,187	7.60
Howrah	179	Shyampur	Hiran Chatterjee	BJP	1,25,651	51.36	Nadebasi Jana	AITC	1,03,391	42.26	22,260	9.10
Howrah	180	Bagnan	Arunava Sen	AITC	1,05,060	48.10	Pramanshu Rana	BJP	93,744	42.92	11,316	5.18
Howrah	181	Amta	Amit Samanta	BJP	1,04,649	44.16	Sukanta Kumar Paul	AITC	100,195	42.28	4,454	1.88
Howrah	182	Udaynarayanpur	Samir Kumar Panja	AITC	1,05,802	49.53	Probhakar Pandit	BJP	93,575	43.81	12,227	5.72
Howrah	183	Jagatballavpur	Anupam Ghosh	BJP	1,15,608	45.78	Subir Chatterjee	AITC	1,08,937	43.14	6,671	2.64
Howrah	184	Domjur	Tapas Maity	AITC	1,34,036	52.73	Gobinda Hazra	BJP	91,859	36.14	42,177	16.59
Hooghly	185	Uttarpara	Dipanjan Chakraborty	BJP	80,612	39.24	Sirsanya Bandhopadhyay	AITC	70,197	34.17	10,415	5.17
Hooghly	186	Sreerampur	Bhaskar Bhattacharya	BJP	85,644	45.97	Tanmoy Ghosh	AITC	76,959	41.31	8,685	4.66
Hooghly	187	Champdani	Dilip Singh	BJP	93,704	45.84	Arindam Guin	AITC	90,678	44.36	3,026	1.48
Hooghly	188	Singur	Arup Kumar Das	BJP	1,13,008	50.77	Becharam Manna	AITC	91,570	41.14	21,438	9.63
Hooghly	189	Chandannagar	Deepanjan Kumar Guha	BJP	86,273	46.16	Indranil Sen	AITC	72,832	38.97	13,441	7.19
Hooghly	190	Chunchura	Subir Nag	BJP	1,37,704	53.96	Debangshu Bhattacharya	AITC	94,269	36.94	43,435	17.02
Hooghly	191	Balagarh (SC)	Sumana Sarkar	BJP	1,25,624	55.58	Ranjan Dhara	AITC	83,710	37.03	41,914	18.55
Hooghly	192	Pandua	Tusar Kumar Majumdar	BJP	1,01,349	43.36	Samir Chakraborty	AITC	96,121	41.13	5,228	2.23
Hooghly	193	Saptagram	Swaraj Ghosh	BJP	1,02,414	52.10	Bidesh Ranjan Bose	AITC	79,125	40.25	23,289	11.85
Hooghly	194	Chanditala	Swati Khandoker	AITC	1,07,143	47.10	Debashish Mukherjee	BJP	87,480	38.46	19,663	8.64
Hooghly	195	Jangipara	Prosenjit Bag	BJP	1,02,409	44.09	Snehasis Chakraborty	AITC	1,01,457	43.72	862	0.37
Hooghly	196	Haripal	Madhumita Ghosh	BJP	1,13,332	46.07	Karabi Manna	AITC	1,09,844	44.65	3,488	1.42
Hooghly	197	Dhanekhali (SC)	Asima Patra	AITC	1,23,462	49.85	Barnali Das	BJP	1,10,405	44.57	13,057	5.28
Hooghly	198	Tarakeswar	Santu Pan	BJP	1,16,901	52.76	Ramendu Sinharay	AITC	85,902	38.77	30,999	13.99
Hooghly	199	Pursurah	Biman Ghosh	BJP	1,38,821	57.62	Partha Hazari	AITC	85,368	35.43	53,453	22.19
Hooghly	200	Arambagh (SC)	Hemanta Bag	BJP	1,23,000	52.15	Mita Bag	AITC	94,041	39.87	28,959	12.28
Hooghly	201	Goghat (SC)	Prasanta Digar	BJP	1,34,498	57.39	Nirmal Maji	AITC	84,916	36.29	49,582	21.15
Hooghly	202	Khanakul	Susanta Ghosh	BJP	1,26,729	53.44	Palash Kumar Roy	AITC	92,246	38.90	34,483	14.54
Purba Medinipur	203	Tamluk	Hare Krishna Bera	BJP	1,36,566	53.15	Dipendra Narayan Roy	AITC	1,01,837	39.64	34,729	13.51
Purba Medinipur	204	Panskura Purba	Subrata Maity	BJP	1,09,264	49.50	Ashim Kumar Maji	AITC	91,361	41.39	17,903	8.11
Purba Medinipur	205	Panskura Paschim	Sintu Senapati	BJP	1,37,919	53.37	Siraj Khan	AITC	1,05,352	40.77	32,567	12.60
Purba Medinipur	206	Moyna	Ashok Dinda	BJP	1,27,166	51.62	Chandan Mondal	AITC	1,10,925	45.03	16,241	6.59
Purba Medinipur	207	Nandakumar	Nirmal Khanra	BJP	1,31,476	52.73	Sukumar De	AITC	1,00,873	40.46	30,603	12.27
Purba Medinipur	208	Mahisadal	Subhas Chandra Panja	BJP	1,21,584	51.05	Tilak Kumar Chakraborty	AITC	95,346	40.03	26,238	11.02
Purba Medinipur	209	Haldia (SC)	Pradip Kumar Bijali	BJP	1,32,183	55.20	Tapasi Mondal	AITC	83,121	34.71	49,062	20.49
Purba Medinipur	210	Nandigram	Suvendu Adhikari	BJP	1,27,301	50.37	Pabitra Kar	AITC	1,17,636	46.55	9,665	3.82
Purba Medinipur	211	Chandipur	Pijush Kanti Das	BJP	1,26,047	52.09	Uttam Barik	AITC	1,05,777	43.72	20,270	8.37
Purba Medinipur	212	Patashpur	Tapan Maity	BJP	1,16,589	50.24	Pijush Kanti Panda	AITC	1,07,538	46.34	9,051	3.90
Purba Medinipur	213	Kanthi Uttar	Sumita Sinha	BJP	1,30,088	52.16	Debabsis Bhunya	AITC	1,10,033	44.12	20,055	8.04
Purba Medinipur	214	Bhagabanpur	Santanu Pramanik	BJP	1,30,586	52.73	Manab Kumar Parua	AITC	1,09,708	44.30	20,878	8.40
Purba Medinipur	215	Khejuri (SC)	Subrata Paik	BJP	1,29,875	54.96	Rabin Chandra Mondal	AITC	97,185	41.12	32,690	13.84
Purba Medinipur	216	Kanthi Dakshin	Arup Kumar Das	BJP	1,18,219	55.54	Tarun Kumar Jana	AITC	86,747	40.76	31,472	14.78
Purba Medinipur	217	Ramnagar	Chandra Sekhar Mondal	BJP	1,31,808	53.83	Akhil Giri	AITC	1,04,869	42.83	26,939	11.00
Purba Medinipur	218	Egra	Dibyendu Adhikari	BJP	1,42,670	52.96	Tarun Kumar Maity	AITC	1,16,978	43.43	25,692	9.53
Paschim Medinipur	219	Dantan	Ajit Kumar Jana	BJP	1,10,259	50.49	Manik Maiti	AITC	99,883	45.74	10,376	4.75
Jhargram	220	Nayagram (ST)	Amiya Kisku	BJP	1,00,857	48.56	Dulal Murmu	AITC	94,433	45.46	6,424	3.10
Jhargram	221	Gopiballavpur	Rajesh Mahata	BJP	1,14,683	53.75	Ajit Mahata	AITC	88,008	41.24	26,675	11.51
Jhargram	222	Jhargram	Lakshmi Kanta Sau	BJP	1,20,877	54.71	Mongal Saren	AITC	82,730	37.44	38,147	17.27
Paschim Medinipur	223	Keshiary (ST)	Bhadra Hemram	BJP	1,13,713	50.80	Ramjiban Mandi	AITC	97,826	43.70	15,887	7.10
Paschim Medinipur	224	Kharagpur Sadar	Dilip Ghosh	BJP	89,885	55.60	Pradip Sarkar	AITC	59,379	36.73	30,506	18.87
Paschim Medinipur	225	Narayangarh	Rama Prasad Giri	BJP	1,16,050	51.25	Pratibha Maiti	AITC	95,683	42.42	20,367	8.83
Paschim Medinipur	226	Sabang	Amal Kumar Panda	BJP	1,27,783	49.66	Manas Bhunia	AITC	1,16,647	45.33	11,136	4.33
Paschim Medinipur	227	Pingla	Swagata Manna	BJP	1,24,189	51.16	Ajit Maity	AITC	1,05,709	43.55	18,480	7.61
Paschim Medinipur	228	Kharagpur	Dinen Roy	AITC	98,320	47.14	Tapan Bhuya	BJP	95,448	45.77	2,872	1.37
Paschim Medinipur	229	Debra	Subhashis Om	BJP	1,14,463	52.67	Rajib Banerjee	AITC	85,662	39.42	28,801	13.25
Paschim Medinipur	230	Daspur	Tapan Kumar Dutta	BJP	1,33,071	52.80	Ashis Hudait	AITC	1,00,937	40.05	32,134	12.75
Paschim Medinipur	231	Ghatal	Shital Kapat	BJP	1,31,550	54.35	Shyamali Sardar	AITC	93,893	38.79	37,657	15.56
Paschim Medinipur	232	Chandrakona (SC)	Sukanta Dolui	BJP	1,40,517	53.09	Surjya Kanta Doloi	AITC	1,07,036	40.44	33,481	12.65
Paschim Medinipur	233	Garbeta	Pradip Lodha	BJP	1,13,752	51.23	Uttara Singha	AITC	87,257	39.42	26,225	11.81
Paschim Medinipur	234	Salboni	Biman Mahata	BJP	1,32,856	49.86	Srikanta Mahata	AITC	1,17,613	44.14	15,243	5.72
Paschim Medinipur	235	Keshpur	Seuli Saha	AITC	1,43,123	56.36	Suvendu Samanta	BJP	93,018	36.63	50,105	19.73
Paschim Medinipur	236	Medinipur	Sankar Kumar Guchhait	BJP	1,33,041	54.51	Sujoy Hazra	AITC	94,294	38.63	38,747	15.88
Jhargram	237	Binpur (ST)	Pranat Tudu	BJP	1,07,238	51.54	Birbaha Hansda	AITC	84,261	40.49	22,977	11.05
Purulia	238	Bandwan (ST)	Labsen Baskey	BJP	1,34,080	50.37	Rajib Lochan Saren	AITC	1,04,503	39.26	29,577	11.11
Purulia	239	Balarampur	Jaladhar Mahato	BJP	1,18,421	53.84	Shantiram Mahato	AITC	83,370	37.90	35,051	15.94
Purulia	240	Baghmundi	Rahidas Mahato	BJP	1,12,663	48.95	Sushanta Mahato	AITC	71,846	31.22	40,817	17.73
Purulia	241	Joypur	Biswajit Mahato	BJP	1,04,668	44.88	Arjun Mahato	AITC	82,450	35.36	22,218	9.52
Purulia	242	Purulia	Sudip Kumar Mukherjee	BJP	1,28,454	55.69	Sujoy Banerjee	AITC	79,201	34.34	49,253	21.35
Purulia	243	Manbazar (ST)	Mayna Murmu	BJP	1,20,487	50.95	Sandhya Rani Tudu	AITC	93,204	39.42	27,283	11.53
Purulia	244	Kashipur	Kamalakanta Hansda	BJP	1,06,571	50.28	Soumen Beltharia	AITC	85,295	40.24	21,276	10.04
Purulia	245	Para (SC)	Nadiar Chand Bouri	BJP	1,13,488	52.55	Manik Chandra Bauri	AITC	79,767	36.94	33,721	15.61
Purulia	246	Raghunathpur (SC)	Mamoni Bauri	BJP	1,27,628	54.44	Hazari Bauri	AITC	83,569	35.65	44,059	16.90
Bankura	247	Saltora (SC)	Chandana Bauri	BJP	1,15,180	52.72	Uttam Bauri	AITC	83,045	38.01	32,135	14.71
Bankura	248	Chhatna	Satyanarayan Mukhopadhyay	BJP	1,25,972	56.76	Swapan Kumar Mandal	AITC	78,798	35.50	47,174	21.26
Bankura	249	Ranibandh (ST)	Kshudiram Tudu	BJP	1,31,145	55.38	Tanushree Hansda	AITC	78,876	33.31	52,269	22.07
Bankura	250	Raipur (ST)	Kshetra Mohan Hansda	BJP	1,11,443	53.01	Thakur Moni Soren	AITC	82,701	39.34	28,742	13.67
Bankura	251	Taldangra	Souvik Patra	BJP	1,24,537	56.62	Falguni Singhababu	AITC	74,464	33.86	50,073	22.76
Bankura	252	Bankura	Niladri Sekhar Dana	BJP	1,36,992	57.24	Anup Mondal	AITC	82,815	34.60	54,177	22.64
Bankura	253	Barjora	Billeswar Sinha	BJP	1,25,419	53.29	Gautam Mishra	AITC	84,109	35.74	41,310	17.55
Bankura	254	Onda	Amarnath Shakha	BJP	1,28,296	52.09	Subrata Dutta	AITC	96,573	39.21	31,723	12.88
Bankura	255	Bishnupur	Shukla Chatterjee	BJP	1,11,082	53.54	Tanmay Ghosh	AITC	80,477	38.79	30,605	14.75
Bankura	256	Katulpur (SC)	Lakshmi Kanta Majumdar	BJP	1,26,241	52.55	Harakali Protiher	AITC	91,874	38.24	34,367	14.31
Bankura	257	Indas (SC)	Nirmal Kumar Dhara	BJP	1,08,733	46.79	Shyamali Roy Bagdi	AITC	1,07,833	46.40	900	0.39
Bankura	258	Sonamukhi (SC)	Dibakar Gharami	BJP	1,15,549	52.08	Kallol Saha	AITC	86,139	38.83	29,410	13.25
Purba Bardhaman	259	Khandaghosh (SC)	Nabin Chandra Bag	AITC	1,04,183	46.67	Goutam Dhara	BJP	95,899	42.96	6,528	3.71
Purba Bardhaman	260	Bardhaman Dakshin	Moumita Biswas Misra	BJP	1,07,754	52.61	Khokan Das	AITC	77,284	37.73	30,470	14.88
Purba Bardhaman	261	Raina (SC)	Subhash Patra	BJP	1,03,487	44.37	Mandira Dalui	AITC	1,02,653	44.01	834	0.36
Purba Bardhaman	262	Jamalpur (SC)	Arun Halder	BJP	99,936	46.53	Bhootnath Mallick	AITC	88,758	41.33	11,178	5.20
Purba Bardhaman	263	Monteswar	Saikat Panja	BJP	96,559	47.29	Siddiqullah Chowdhury	AITC	81,761	40.05	14,798	7.24
Purba Bardhaman	264	Kalna (SC)	Siddhartha Majumdar	BJP	1,10,790	51.96	Deboprasad Bag	AITC	82,160	38.53	28,630	13.43
Purba Bardhaman	265	Memari	Manab Guha	BJP	1,06,428	46.78	Rasbihari Halder	AITC	99,322	43.66	7,106	3.12
Purba Bardhaman	266	Bardhaman Uttar (SC)	Nisith Kumar Malik	AITC	1,12,688	45.45	Sanjay Das	BJP	1,06,228	42.85	6,460	2.60
Purba Bardhaman	267	Bhatar	Soumen Karfa	BJP	98,820	46.03	Shantanu Koner	AITC	92,292	42.99	6,528	3.04
Purba Bardhaman	268	Purbasthali Dakshin	Prankrishna Tapadar	BJP	1,11,004	50.44	Swapan Debnath	AITC	94,342	42.87	16,662	7.57
Purba Bardhaman	269	Purbasthali Uttar	Gopal Chattopadhyay	BJP	1,11,379	49.53	Vasundhara Goswami	AITC	81,153	36.09	30,226	13.44
Purba Bardhaman	270	Katwa	Krishna Ghosh	BJP	1,22,020	50.94	Rabindranath Chatterjee	AITC	86,954	36.30	35,066	14.64
Purba Bardhaman	271	Ketugram	Anadi Ghosh	BJP	1,11,104	50.69	Sekh Sahonawez	AITC	83,494	38.09	27,610	12.60
Purba Bardhaman	272	Mangalkot	Shishir Ghosh	BJP	1,04,020	47.44	Apurba Chowdhury	AITC	91,297	41.64	12,723	5.80
Purba Bardhaman	273	Ausgram (SC)	Kalita Maji	BJP	1,07,692	47.68	Shyama Prasanna Lohar	AITC	95,157	42.13	12,535	5.55
Purba Bardhaman	274	Galsi (SC)	Raju Patra	BJP	1,10,640	47.62	Alok Kumar Majhi	AITC	1,00,146	43.10	10,494	4.52
Paschim Bardhaman	275	Pandabeswar	Jitendra Tiwari	BJP	80,501	46.08	Narendranath Chakraborty	AITC	79,103	45.28	1,398	0.80
Paschim Bardhaman	276	Durgapur Purba	Chandra Sekhar Banerjee	BJP	1,08,888	50.69	Pradip Mazumdar	AITC	77,954	36.29	30,934	14.40
Paschim Bardhaman	277	Durgapur Paschim	Lakshman Chandra Ghorui	BJP	1,14,729	52.93	Kabi Dutta	AITC	77,131	35.58	37,598	17.35
Paschim Bardhaman	278	Raniganj	Partha Ghosh	BJP	97,416	49.58	Kalobaran Mondal	AITC	79,630	40.53	17,786	9.05
Paschim Bardhaman	279	Jamuria	Bijan Mukherjee	BJP	90,150	49.64	Hareram Singh	AITC	67,636	37.25	22,514	12.39
Paschim Bardhaman	280	Asansol Dakshin	Agnimitra Paul	BJP	1,19,582	55.42	Tapas Banerjee	AITC	78,743	36.49	40,839	18.93
Paschim Bardhaman	281	Asansol Uttar	Krishnendu Mukherjee	BJP	1,04,516	49.63	Moloy Ghatak	AITC	92,901	44.11	11,615	5.52
Paschim Bardhaman	282	Kulti	Ajay Kumar Poddar	BJP	1,03,570	54.44	Abhijit Ghatak	AITC	77,072	40.51	26,498	13.93
Paschim Bardhaman	283	Barabani	Arijit Roy	BJP	91,777	49.54	Bidhan Upadhyay	AITC	80,055	43.21	11,722	6.33
Birbhum	284	Dubrajpur (SC)	Anup Kumar Saha	BJP	1,17,437	53.33	Chandra Naresh Bauri	AITC	89,790	40.78	27,647	12.55
Birbhum	285	Suri	Jagannath Chattopadhyay	BJP	1,24,243	52.09	Ujjal Chatterjee	AITC	95,557	40.07	28,686	12.02
Birbhum	286	Bolpur	Chandranath Sinha	AITC	1,14,915	46.65	Dilip Ghosh	BJP	101,727	41.30	13,188	5.35
Birbhum	287	Nanoor (SC)	Bidhan Chandra Majhi	AITC	1,19,910	47.37	Khokan Das	BJP	111,788	44.16	8,122	3.21
Birbhum	288	Labpur	Debasis Ojha	BJP	1,06,402	47.71	Abhijit Sinha	AITC	102,852	46.12	3,550	1.59
Birbhum	289	Sainthia (SC)	Krishna Kanta Saha	BJP	1,15,054	47.71	Nilabati Saha	AITC	104,748	43.43	10,306	4.28
Birbhum	290	Mayureswar	Dudh Kumar Mondal	BJP	1,07,056	50.15	Abhijit Roy	AITC	86,054	40.31	21,002	9.84
Birbhum	291	Rampurhat	Dhruba Saha	BJP	1,11,920	47.89	Asish Banerjee	AITC	87,687	37.52	24,233	10.37
Birbhum	292	Hansan	Fayezul Haque	AITC	1,03,223	45.56	Nikhil Banerjee	BJP	74,925	33.07	28,298	12.49
Birbhum	293	Nalhati	Rajendra Prasad Singh	AITC	87,744	39.43	Anil Kumar Singh	BJP	74,298	33.39	13,446	6.04
Birbhum	294	Murarai	Mosarraf Hossain	AITC	96,902	39.89	Sanjibur Rahaman	INC	59,197	24.37	37,705	15.52

=== Results by margin ===
Highest
	Name	Constituency	District	Party	Margin	%
1.	Debangshu Panda	Falta	South 24 Parganas	BJP	1,09,021	51.86
2.	Anandamoy Barman	Matigara-Naxalbari	Darjeeling	BJP	1,04,265	41.54
3.	Shikha Chatterjee	Dabgram-Phulbari	Jalpaiguri	BJP	97,715	38.79
4.	Amlan Bhaduri	English Bazar	Malda	BJP	93,784	39.99
5.	Mohammad Baharul Islam	Canning Purba	South 24 Parganas	AITC	91,954	38.05

Lowest
	Name	Constituency	District	Party	Margin	%
1.	Piyush Kanodia	Rajarhat New Town	North 24 Parganas	BJP	316	0.12
2.	Agniswar Naskar	Satgachhia	South 24 Parganas	BJP	401	0.17
3.	Subhash Patra	Raina	Purba Bardhaman	BJP	834	0.36
4.	Prosenjit Bag	Jangipara	Hooghly	BJP	862	0.37
5.	Nirmal Kumar Dhara	Indas	Bankura	BJP	900	0.39

== Reactions ==
=== Domestic ===
As soon as trends suggested a victory for the BJP, celebrations were observed all over Bengal by BJP workers. TMC headquarters was observed to be emptying on the other hand.

The monumental electoral outcome in West Bengal resonated nationwide across India, generating widespread political commentary, public debate, and official reactions from national parties and leaders. Prime Minister Narendra Modi and senior Bharatiya Janata Party (BJP) leaders hailed the mandate as a historic and transformative turning point for the state, declaring that West Bengal had been "freed from fear" and paving the way for administrative reform, growth, and development. National strategists noted that the landslide victory substantially strengthened the ruling party's political hegemony in eastern India and provided a powerful counterweight to previous setbacks in the 2024 general elections.

==== Trinamool Congress ====
During the vote counting process, sitting CM Mamata Banerjee visited Bhabanipur counting centre where she publicly claimed about being physically attacked, and CCTV to have stopped working. This was denied by DEO of South Kolkata, West Bengal Chief Electoral Officer (CEO) from ECI among others terming it as a lie. Thereafter, in an unprecedented act she refused to resign from her post and called the BJP victory as immoral. However, her own party's overall reaction was opposite i.e. acceptance towards defeat and self-criticism. Many in TMC had blamed Abhishek and Indian Political Action Committee (I-PAC) for corporatizing the party which led to the disastrous result. TMC candidate from Kashipur-Belgachia and Deputy Mayor of Kolkata, Atin Ghosh accepted the election results as clean and fair while also blaming Abhishek for overly depending on technology rather than doing grassroot work to remain informed about the public opinion. Former state minister and chairman of the English Bazar Municipality, Krishnendu Narayan Choudhury, directly criticized Abhishek and I-PAC for the defeat, while terming Mamata as Dhritarashtra. The same was also reflected in the comments made by Mamata's own counting agent who is Firhad Hakim's daughter, Priyadarshini where besides Mamata as Dhritarashtra she also called out her nephew, Abhishek as 'Duryodhana'. She signaled by stating "Don't blindfold yourself and see through the ears. The two epics are a lesson. When loyalty blinds judgment, history repeats itself." On the other hand, outgoing MLA and defeated TMC candidate of Behala Paschim, Ratna Chatterjee blamed syndicate, insolence and arrogance of the local leaders for the statewide defeat.

Among the sitting MPs of TMC, Mahua Moitra and Saayoni Ghosh respectfully accepted the public mandate to the BJP. Dev, accepting the BJP win, gave congratulations and good wishes to the BJP on getting the public mandate and requested upcoming government to complete Ghatal masterplan and end the political culture of 'ban and division' in Bengali film industry, pointing to the dominance and political discrimination by the TMC's Biswas brothers over it. Saugata Roy, terming the election as peaceful and deathless, commented: "People were angry at us. We could not handle the oppression and extortion by our local leaders. Besides, we were wrong for not being able to understand that Hindu polarization would reach this level". Although he did not expect the results to be bad for them up to that extent, but the election results led to his conclusion that he and his party had failed to read the public mind and people had voted against them en masse as if 'all people assembled in ground and took a decision to vote'. Kalyan Banerjee heavily attacked I-PAC by accusing it of hijacking and ruining the party, creating divisions among leaders by grooming multiple individuals for potential candidacy. He also criticised Abhishek for making the party overly dependent on the firm which was not accepted within the party.

==== Left and Congress ====
Congress Leader Rahul Gandhi accused the Trinamool Congress (TMC) of misgovernance paving the way for the Bharatiya Janata Party (BJP) in West Bengal, as it did not stop violence or work for raising the income of the people.

Bengal Congress president Subhankar Sarkar called the 15 years of Trinamool Congress rule as "filled with endless corruption, political violence, violence against women which include heinous crimes like the R. G. Kar case and the attempt to hide the involved criminals, underdevelopment, unemployment, etc. created agitation among the public that got reflected in the election results with the defeat of TMC and a first-time-win for the BJP". He further blamed TMC for paving the road for BJP to come to power in Bengal while respectfully accepting the people's verdict and also to play the role of a responsible and constructive opposition. Senior Congress leader and candidate from Baharampur, Adhir Ranjan Chowdhury accepted his defeat from his seat while being personally happy about the defeat of Mamata. Over Mamata's claim of electoral malpractice leading to her defeat, he said "You have lost, first accept that defeat politely. Why are you so greedy to stay in power? The people of Bengal wanted to oust Mamata and were able to breathe a sigh of relief as she lost. You yourself are a thief, looting in every local elections". According to his analysis, he lost due to the first priority of Hindus to oust Mamata led TMC as they were fearing a "West Bangladesh" which on TMC winning would have caused a statewide 'Saffron Cyclone' and unprecedented Hindu polarization. On the other hand, Congress workers were distributing sweets to people with joy as they celebrated the loss of TMC in Shyampur.

CPI(M) State General Secretary Mohammed Salim on behalf of the party in his press release stated: "The results clearly indicate that the people have mandated against the TMC’s limitless corruption, autocratic rule, and misgovernance. The citizens of the state sought the downfall of the TMC government, and the BJP has reaped the benefits of this public anger". Some left workers openly admitted voting for BJP in order to remove TMC from power. Unsuccessful CPI(M) candidate from Kaliganj, Sabina Yasmin felt happy for the fall of Mamata and TMC as her daughter Tamanna was killed via bombing during the TMC led victory procession after a bypoll win in 2025. This happened due to their family being linked to CPI(M). Now with BJP in power, she is further expecting a clean investigation and proper justice to the new government.

=== International ===
The historic defeat of the All India Trinamool Congress (AITC) and the Bharatiya Janata Party's (BJP) transition into power after 15 years of opposition drew significant global attention, capturing wide coverage across international media and responses from prominent world leaders.

==== Global Media Coverage ====
Major international news organizations, including The New York Times, BBC News, and The Guardian, characterized the election outcome as a major political turning point in India. Publications noted that the BJP's breakthrough in West Bengal—a long-standing eastern regional bastion—marked a key milestone for Prime Minister Narendra Modi's national political dominance and significantly altered the state's traditional political landscape.

==== Foreign Government Statements ====
Following the announcement of the election results, several world leaders and foreign officials extended their congratulations. U.S. President Donald Trump praised Prime Minister Narendra Modi, describing the mandate as a "historic" and "decisive" victory for the ruling coalition and praising India's democratic trajectory under Modi's leadership. Other global commentators and diplomatic circles also noted the significance of the peaceful transition of power in one of India's most politically volatile and populous states.

=== Bangladesh ===
Bangladesh, the neighboring country which borders West Bengal and also shares in common the Bengali language, culture and other cross-border ties is influenced by the development in West Bengal politics. Bangladeshi analysts are portraying the developments in West Bengal with contentions. Although they highlighted that power shift in a state will not impact the central government's external affairs at large, they asserted that internal policy shifts in the state of West Bengal can create influence in Bangladesh's internal politics. Analysts were optimistic on the proposed treaty on Teesta water sharing, which had been stalled for a long-time due to former state government's objections. Further they added that the state foreign policy would not be at a disadvantage because of the newly elected government. Some analysts expressed fear for a refugee crisis along the border.

The Bangladesh Nationalist Party-led government of Bangladesh refused to comment on the election, calling it "India's internal affairs", and expressed desire to cooperate with "BJP or any other political party" in charge of the state. However, the government considerably increased security along the Indian border in concerns of possible push-ins of alleged Bangladeshi immigrants from India.

Members of the Jamaat-e-Islami-led opposition commented on the elections. Jamaat-aligned Islamist party Bangladesh Khelafat Majlis had organized a protest in Dhaka against alleged repression of Muslims in West Bengal and Assam after the elections.

Nahid Islam, MP and the convener of National Citizen Party and one of the leading figures of Bangladesh's July Uprising, alleged that Muslims and Matuas were denied the right to vote and faced persecution after the election, which he said had implications for Bangladesh. He called on Bangladesh to set an example for South Asia by ensuring safety for the minorities.

== Aftermath ==
=== Fall of the incumbent government ===
In a move unprecedented in Indian politics, Mamata Banerjee, the incumbent chief minister of Trinamool Congress, refused to resign from her office despite losing her seat and an assembly majority in the election results. She had further alleged irregularities in the election conduct. Her tenure as chief minister came to an end on 7 May 2026 after the dissolution of the assembly by the state governor, R. N. Ravi.

=== New government formation ===
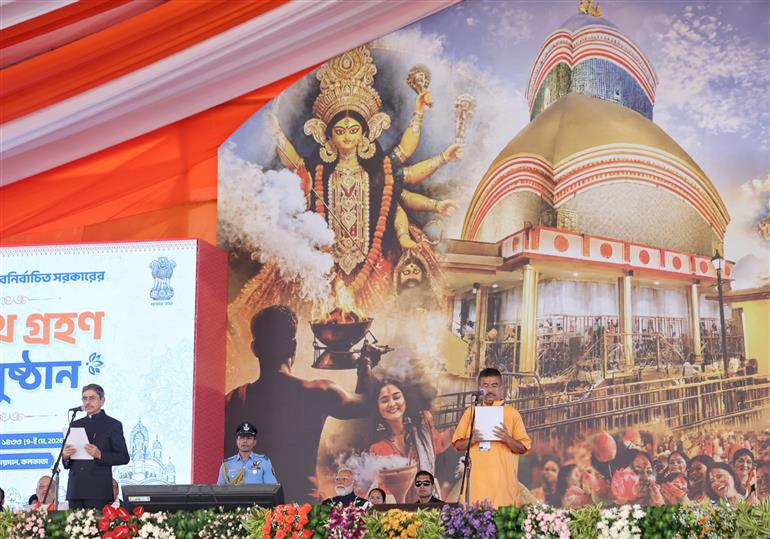
Suvendu Adhikari taking oath as chief minister of West Bengal

The BJP leadership selected the day of Rabindra Jayanti or 25 Baishakh of Bengali calendar as the day of swearing in of the new government, which fell on 9 May and is a cultural day of the state marking the birth anniversary of Rabindranath Tagore. On 8 May, Union Home minister Amit Shah came to Kolkata in order to have the Legislative Party meeting for selecting the Chief Minister candidate. Suvendu Adhikari, the outgoing Leader of Opposition, was selected as the Chief Ministerial candidate. On the next day, Adhikari took oath as the chief minister at Brigade along with five other BJP leaders from the state including Dilip Ghosh, Agnimitra Paul, Ashok Kirtania, Kshudiram Tudu and Nisith Pramanik as ministers of the inaugural cabinet. On 1 June, it was expanded to a full cabinet with swearing in of 35 more members.

=== Rebellion in Trinamool Congress ===
After the election, various politicians from the Trinamool Congress rebelled against the top leadership of the party. A split occurred in its legislative party, leading to disagreement over the office of Leader of Opposition. Several members of parliament also rebelled against the top leadership. Certain members of parliament in the Lok Sabha extended their support to the governing National Democratic Alliance.

== 2026–2031 re-elections and by-elections ==
=== Re-elections ===
Date	S.No	Constituency	MLA before election	Party before election	Reason	Elected MLA	Party after election
21 May 2026	144	Falta	Shankar Kumar Naskar	Trinamool Congress	Voting irregularities	Debangshu Panda	Bharatiya Janata Party

=== By-elections ===
Date	S.No	Constituency	MLA before election	Party before election	Reason	Elected MLA	Party after election
6 October 2026	70	Rejinagar	Humayun Kabir	Aam Janata Unnayan Party	Resignation	Sakharav Sarkar	Bharatiya Janata Party
6 October 2026	210	Nandigram	Suvendu Adhikari	Bharatiya Janata Party	Resignation	Hasi Rani Rath	Bharatiya Janata Party

== See also ==
- 2026 elections in India
- 2024 Indian general election in West Bengal
- 2026 Kolkata Municipal Corporation election
- 2026 Rajya Sabha elections
- Elections in West Bengal
- Politics of West Bengal
