= List of candidates in the 2021 West Bengal Legislative Assembly election =

This is a list of candidates in the 2021 West Bengal Legislative Assembly election.

A total of 2,116 candidates contested 292 seats. The voting in two constituencies had to be postponed to 16 May, after the death of one candidate from each constituency. Voting for said constituencies was postponed again and finally took place on 30 September. A total of 16 candidates contested for these two constituencies.

== List of candidates ==
List of the candidates (constituency wise) of the four main parties/alliance:

List of candidates
| Assembly Constituency | | AITC+ | | NDA | | Sanjukta Morcha | | Voting On |
| # | Name | Party | Candidate | Party | Candidate | Party | Candidate | Voting On |
Cooch Behar district
| 1 | Mekliganj | AITC | Paresh Chandra Adhikary | BJP | Dadhiram Ray | AIFB | Gobindo Ray | 10 April 2021 |
| 2 | Mathabhanga | AITC | Girindra Nath Barman | BJP | Sushil Barman | CPI(M) | Ashok Barman | 10 April 2021 |
| 3 | Cooch Behar Uttar | AITC | Binay Krishna Barman | BJP | Sukumar Roy | AIFB | Nagendra Nath Ray | 10 April 2021 |
| 4 | Cooch Behar Dakshin | AITC | Avijit Dey Bhowmik | BJP | Nikhil Ranjan Dey | AIFB | Akshay Thakur | 10 April 2021 |
| 5 | Sitalkuchi | AITC | Partha Pratim Ray | BJP | Baren Chandra Barman | CPI(M) | Sudhangsu Pramanik | 10 April 2021 |
| 6 | Sitai | AITC | Jagadish Basunia | BJP | Dipak Kumar Roy | INC | Keshab Chandra Roy | 10 April 2021 |
| 7 | Dinhata | AITC | Udayan Guha | BJP | Nisith Pramanik | AIFB | Abdul Rauf | 10 April 2021 |
| 8 | Natabari | AITC | Rabindra Nath Ghosh | BJP | Mihir Goswami | CPI(M) | Akik Hasan | 10 April 2021 |
| 9 | Tufanganj | AITC | Pranab Kumar Dey | BJP | Maloti Rava Roy | INC | Rabin Roy | 10 April 2021 |
Alipurdar district
| 10 | Kumargram | AITC | Leos Kujur | BJP | Manoj Oraon | RSP | Kishor Minz | 10 April 2021 |
| 11 | Kalchini | AITC | Pasang Lama | BJP | Bishal Lama | INC | Abhijit Narzinari | 10 April 2021 |
| 12 | Alipurduars | AITC | Sourav Chakraborty | BJP | Suman Kanjilal | INC | Debprosad Roy | 10 April 2021 |
| 13 | Falakata | AITC | Subhash Roy | BJP | Dipak Barman | CPI(M) | Khsitish Chandra Roy | 10 April 2021 |
| 14 | Madarihat | AITC | Rajesh Lakra | BJP | Manoj Tigga | RSP | Subhas Lohar | 10 April 2021 |
Jalpaiguri district
| 15 | Dhupguri | AITC | Mitali Roy | BJP | Bishnu Pada Roy | CPI(M) | Dr. Pradip Kumar Roy | 17 April 2021 |
| 16 | Maynaguri | AITC | Manoj Roy | BJP | Koushik Roy | RSP | Naresh Chandra Roy | 17 April 2021 |
| 17 | Jalpaiguri | AITC | Pradip Kumar Barma | BJP | Sujit Singha | INC | Sukhbilas Barma | 17 April 2021 |
| 18 | Rajganj | AITC | Khageswar Roy | BJP | Supen Roy | CPI(M) | Ratan Ray | 17 April 2021 |
| 19 | Dabgram-Phulbari | AITC | Goutam Deb | BJP | Sikha Chatterjee | CPI(M) | Dilip Singh | 17 April 2021 |
| 20 | Mal | AITC | Bulu Chik Baraik | BJP | Mahesh Bagey | CPI(M) | Manu Oraon | 17 April 2021 |
| 21 | Nagrakata | AITC | Joseph Munda | BJP | Puna Bhengra | INC | Sukhbir Subba | 17 April 2021 |
Kalimpong district
| 22 | Kalimpong | GJM (Gurung) | Dr. Ram Bahadur Bhujel | BJP | Suva Pradhan | INC | Dilip Pradhan | 17 April 2021 |
| 22 | Kalimpong | GJM (Tamang) | Ruden Sada Lepcha | BJP | Suva Pradhan | INC | Dilip Pradhan | 17 April 2021 |
Darjeeling district
| 23 | Darjeeling | GJM (Gurung) | Pemba Tshering | BJP | Neeraj Zimba | CPI(M) | Gautam Raj Rai | 17 April 2021 |
| 23 | Darjeeling | GJM (Tamang) | Keshav Raj Sharma | BJP | Neeraj Zimba | CPI(M) | Gautam Raj Rai | 17 April 2021 |
| 24 | Kurseong | GJM (Gurung) | Narbu Lama | BJP | Bishnu Prasad Sharma | CPI(M) | Uttam Brahman | 17 April 2021 |
| 24 | Kurseong | GJM (Tamang) | Tshering Lama Dahal | BJP | Bishnu Prasad Sharma | CPI(M) | Uttam Brahman | 17 April 2021 |
| 25 | Matigara-Naxalbari | AITC | Rajan Sundas | BJP | Anandamoy Barman | INC | Sankar Malakar | 17 April 2021 |
| 26 | Siliguri | AITC | Prof. Omprakash Mishra | BJP | Shankar Ghosh | CPI(M) | Ashok Bhattacharya | 17 April 2021 |
| 27 | Phansidewa | AITC | Choton Kisku | BJP | Durga Murmu | INC | Sunil Chandra Tirkey | 17 April 2021 |
Uttar Dinajpur district
| 28 | Chopra | AITC | Hamidul Rahaman | BJP | Md. Shahin Akhtar | CPI(M) | Anwarul Haque | 22 April 2021 |
| 29 | Islampur | AITC | Abdul Karim Chowdhury | BJP | Saumya Roop Mandal | INC | Sadikul Islam | 22 April 2021 |
| 30 | Goalpokhar | AITC | Md.Ghulam Rabbani | BJP | Gulam Sarwar | INC | Masud Nasim Ehsan | 22 April 2021 |
| 31 | Chakulia | AITC | Minhajul Arfin Azad | BJP | Sachin Prasad | AIFB | Ali Imran Ramz | 22 April 2021 |
| 32 | Karandighi | AITC | Goutam Pal | BJP | Subhash Singha | AIFB | Hafizul Iqbal | 22 April 2021 |
| 33 | Hemtabad | AITC | Satyajit Barman | BJP | Chandrima Roy | CPI(M) | Bhupendra Nath Barman | 22 April 2021 |
| 34 | Kaliaganj | AITC | Tapan Dev Singha | BJP | Soumen Roy | INC | Provas Sarkar | 22 April 2021 |
| 35 | Raiganj | AITC | Kanaia Lal Agarwal | BJP | Krishna Kalyani | INC | Mohit Sengupta | 22 April 2021 |
| 36 | Itahar | AITC | Mosaraf Hossain | BJP | Amit Kumar Kundu | CPI | Srikumar Mukherjee | 22 April 2021 |
Dakshin Dinajpur district
| 37 | Kushmandi | AITC | Rekha Roy | BJP | Ranjit Kumar Roy | RSP | Narmada Chandra Roy | 26 April 2021 |
| 38 | Kumarganj | AITC | Toraf Hossain Mandal | BJP | Manas Sarkar | INC | Nargis Banu Chowdhury | 26 April 2021 |
| 39 | Balurghat | AITC | Sekhar Dasgupta | BJP | Ashok Lahiri | RSP | Sucheta Biswas | 26 April 2021 |
| 40 | Tapan | AITC | Kalpana Kisku | BJP | Budhrai Tudu | RSP | Raghu Urwo | 26 April 2021 |
| 41 | Gangarampur | AITC | Goutam Das | BJP | Satyendra Nath Roy | CPI(M) | Nandalal Hazra | 26 April 2021 |
| 42 | Harirampur | AITC | Biplab Mitra | BJP | Nilanjan Roy | CPI(M) | Rafikul Islam | 26 April 2021 |
Malda district
| 43 | Habibpur | AITC | Pradip Baskey | BJP | Joyel Murmu | CPI(M) | Thakur Tudu | 26 April 2021 |
| 44 | Gazole | AITC | Basanti Barman | BJP | Chinmoy Deb Barman | CPI(M) | Arun Biswas | 26 April 2021 |
| 45 | Chanchal | AITC | Nihar Ranjan Ghosh | BJP | Dipankar Ram | INC | Asif Mehbub | 26 April 2021 |
| 46 | Harishchandrapur | AITC | Tajmul Hossain | BJP | Md. Matiur Rahaman | INC | Alam Mostaque | 26 April 2021 |
| 47 | Malatipur | AITC | Abdul Rahim Boxi | BJP | Mausumi Das | INC | Alberuni Zulkarnain | 26 April 2021 |
| 48 | Ratua | AITC | Samar Mukherjee | BJP | Abhishek Singhania | INC | Najima Khatun | 26 April 2021 |
| 49 | Manikchak | AITC | Sabitri Mitra | BJP | Gour Chand Mandal | INC | Md. Mottakin Alam | 29 April 2021 |
| 50 | Maldaha | AITC | Ujjal Chowdhury | BJP | Gopal Chandra Saha | INC | Bhupendra Nath Halder | 29 April 2021 |
| 51 | English Bazar | AITC | Krishnendu Narayan Chowdhury | BJP | Sreerupa Mitra Chaudhury | CPI(M) | Koushik Mishra | 29 April 2021 |
| 52 | Mothabari | AITC | Sabina Yeasmin | BJP | Shyam Chand Ghosh | INC | Md. Dulal Sekh | 29 April 2021 |
| 53 | Sujapur | AITC | Md. Abdul Ghani | BJP | S K Jiyauddin | INC | Isha Khan Choudhury | 29 April 2021 |
| 54 | Baisnabnagar | AITC | Chandana Sarkar | BJP | Swadhin Kumar Sarkar | INC | Azizul Haque | 29 April 2021 |
Murshidabad district
| 55 | Farakka | AITC | Monirul Islam | BJP | Hemanta Ghosh | INC | Mainul Haque | 26 April 2021 |
| 56 | Samserganj (Note: Polling for two constituencies, namely Samserganj and Jangipur, was postponed due to the death of two candidates - Rezaul Haque, Congress nominee of Samserganj and Pradeep Nandi, RSP nominee of Jangipur. After 30 September was finalised as the date of voting for said constituencies, Samserganj's Congress candidate Zaidur Rahaman decided not to contest the election. As a result, Congress had to announce that they would support the CPI(M) candidate Mohammad Modassar Hossain in that constituency. Later, however, Zaidur Rahaman agreed to contest the election. RSP had fielded Jane Alam Mia as their candidate in Jangipur.) | AITC | Amirul Islam | BJP | Milan Ghosh | CPI(M) | Md. Modassar Hossain | 30 September 2021 |
| 56 | Samserganj | AITC | Amirul Islam | BJP | Milan Ghosh | INC | Zaidur Rahaman | 30 September 2021 |
| 57 | Suti | AITC | Emani Biswas | BJP | Kaushik Das | INC | Humayun Roja | 26 April 2021 |
| 58 | Jangipur | AITC | Jakir Hossain | BJP | Sujit Das | RSP | Janey Alam Mia | 30 September 2021 |
| 59 | Raghunathganj | AITC | Akhruzzaman | BJP | Golam Modarsha | INC | Abdul Kasem Biswas | 26 April 2021 |
| 60 | Sagardighi | AITC | Subrata Saha | BJP | Mafuja Khatun | INC | S. K. Hasnuzzaman | 26 April 2021 |
| 61 | Lalgola | AITC | Mohammad Ali | BJP | Kalpana Ghosh | INC | Abu Hena | 26 April 2021 |
| 62 | Bhagabangola | AITC | Idris Ali | BJP | Mehbub Alam | CPI(M) | Kamaal Hossain | 26 April 2021 |
| 63 | Raninagar | AITC | Soumik Hossain | BJP | Masuhara Khatun | INC | Firoza Begam | 26 April 2021 |
| 64 | Murshidabad | AITC | Shaoni Singha Roy | BJP | Gouri Sankar Ghosh | INC | Niazuddin Sekh | 26 April 2021 |
| 65 | Nabagram | AITC | Kanai Chandra Mondal | BJP | Mohan Halder | CPI(M) | Kripalini Ghosh | 26 April 2021 |
| 66 | Khargram | AITC | Ashis Marjit | BJP | Aditya Moulik | INC | Bipadtaran Bagdi | 29 April 2021 |
| 67 | Burwan | AITC | Jiban Krishna Saha | BJP | Amiya Kumar Das | INC | Shiladitya Haldar | 29 April 2021 |
| 68 | Kandi | AITC | Apurba Sarkar (David) | BJP | Goutam Roy | INC | Saiful Alam Khan | 29 April 2021 |
| 69 | Bharatpur | AITC | Humayun Kabir | BJP | Iman Kalyan Mukherje | INC | Kamalesh Chatterjee | 29 April 2021 |
| 70 | Rejinagar | AITC | Rabiul Alam Chowdhury | BJP | Arobindo Biswas | INC | Kafiruddin Sekh | 29 April 2021 |
| 71 | Beldanga | AITC | Hasanuzzaman Sk. | BJP | Sumit Ghosh | INC | Seikh Safiujjaman | 29 April 2021 |
| 72 | Baharampur | AITC | Naru Gopal Mukherjee | BJP | Subrata Moitra | INC | Manoj Chakraborty | 29 April 2021 |
| 73 | Hariharpara | AITC | Niamot Sheikh | BJP | Tanmoy Biswas | INC | Mir Almagir | 29 April 2021 |
| 74 | Naoda | AITC | Sahina Mamtaz Begum (Khan) | BJP | Anupam Mondal | INC | Mosharaf Hossain Mondal | 29 April 2021 |
| 75 | Domkal | AITC | Jafikul Islam | BJP | Rubiya Khatun | CPI(M) | Mustafizur Rahman | 29 April 2021 |
| 76 | Jalangi | AITC | Abdur Razzak | BJP | Chandan Mondal | CPI(M) | Saiful Islam Molla | 29 April 2021 |
Nadia district
| 77 | Karimpur | AITC | Bimalendu Sinha Roy | BJP | Samarendra Nath Ghosh | CPI(M) | Pravas Majumdar | 22 April 2021 |
| 78 | Tehatta | AITC | Tapas Kumar Saha | BJP | Ashutosh Paul | CPI(M) | Subodh Biswas | 22 April 2021 |
| 79 | Palashipara | AITC | Manik Bhattacharya | BJP | Bibhash Chandra Mandal | CPI(M) | M. S. Sadi | 22 April 2021 |
| 80 | Kaliganj | AITC | Naseeruddin Ahamed (Lal) | BJP | Abhijit Ghosh | INC | Abdul Kasem | 22 April 2021 |
| 81 | Nakashipara | AITC | Kallol Khan | BJP | Shantanu Deb | CPI(M) | Sukla Saha Chakraborty | 22 April 2021 |
| 82 | Chapra | AITC | Rukbanur Rahman | BJP | Kalyan Kumar Nandi | RSMP (Note: ISF borrowed the symbol of RSMP for this election.) | Kanchan Moitra | 22 April 2021 |
| 83 | Krishnanagar Uttar | AITC | Koushani Mukherjee | BJP | Mukul Roy | INC | Sylvie Saha | 22 April 2021 |
| 84 | Nabadwip | AITC | Pundarikakshya Saha (Nanda) | BJP | Siddartha Naskar | CPI(M) | Swarnendu Singha | 22 April 2021 |
| 85 | Krishnanagar Dakshin | AITC | Ujjal Biswas | BJP | Mahadev Sarkar | CPI(M) | Sumit Biswas | 22 April 2021 |
| 86 | Santipur | AITC | Ajoy Dey | BJP | Jagannath Sarkar | INC | Riju Ghoshal | 17 April 2021 |
| 87 | Ranaghat Uttar Paschim | AITC | Sankar Singha | BJP | Partha Sarathi Chatterjee | INC | Bijoyendu Biswas | 17 April 2021 |
| 88 | Krishnaganj | AITC | Dr. Tapas Mandal | BJP | Ashis Kumar Biswas | CPI(M) | Jhunu Baidya | 17 April 2021 |
| 89 | Ranaghat Uttar Purba | AITC | Samir Kumar Poddar | BJP | Ashim Biswas | RSMP | Dinesh Chandra Biswas | 17 April 2021 |
| 90 | Ranaghat Dakshin | AITC | Barnali Dey | BJP | Mukut Mani Adhikari | CPI(M) | Rama Biswas | 17 April 2021 |
| 91 | Chakdaha | AITC | Subhankar Singha (Jishu) | BJP | Bankim Ch. Ghosh | CPI(M) | Narayan Dasgupta | 17 April 2021 |
| 92 | Kalyani | AITC | Aniruddha Biswas | BJP | Ambika Roy | CPI(M) | Sabuj Das | 17 April 2021 |
| 93 | Haringhata | AITC | Nilima Nag (Mallick) | BJP | Ashim Sarkar | CPI(M) | Alakesh Das | 17 April 2021 |
North 24 Parganas district
| 94 | Bagda | AITC | Paritosh Kumar Saha | BJP | Biswajit Das | INC | Prabir Kirtania | 22 April 2021 |
| 95 | Bangaon Uttar | AITC | Shyamal Roy | BJP | Ashok Kritonia | CPI(M) | Piyush Kanti Saha | 22 April 2021 |
| 96 | Bangaon Dakshin | AITC | Alo Rani Sarkar | BJP | Swapan Majumdar | CPI(M) | Tapas Kumar Biswas | 22 April 2021 |
| 97 | Gaighata | AITC | Narottam Biswas | BJP | Subrata Thakur | CPI | Kapil Krishna Thakur | 22 April 2021 |
| 98 | Swarupnagar | AITC | Bina Mandal | BJP | Brindaban Sarkar | CPI(M) | Biswajit Mondal | 22 April 2021 |
| 99 | Baduria | AITC | Quasi Abdul Mallick | BJP | Sukalyan Baidya | INC | Dr. Abdus Sattar | 22 April 2021 |
| 100 | Habra | AITC | Jyotipriyo Mallick | BJP | Rahul Sinha | CPI(M) | Rijinandan Biswas | 22 April 2021 |
| 101 | Ashokenagar | AITC | Narayan Goswami | BJP | Tanuja Chakraborty | RSMP | Tapas Banerjee | 22 April 2021 |
| 102 | Amdanga | AITC | Rafiqur Rahman | BJP | Jaydeb Manna | RSMP | Jamal Uddin | 22 April 2021 |
| 103 | Bijpur | AITC | Subodh Adhikary | BJP | Subhranshu Roy | CPI(M) | Sukanta Rakshit | 22 April 2021 |
| 104 | Naihati | AITC | Partha Bhowmick | BJP | Phalguni Patra | CPI(M) | Indrani Kundu Mukherjee | 22 April 2021 |
| 105 | Bhatpara | AITC | Jitendra Shaw | BJP | Pawan Singh | INC | Dharmendra Shaw | 22 April 2021 |
| 106 | Jagatdal | AITC | Somnath Shyam | BJP | Arindam Bhattacharya | AIFB | Nimai Saha | 22 April 2021 |
| 107 | Noapara | AITC | Manju Basu | BJP | Sunil Singh | INC | Suvankar Sarkar | 22 April 2021 |
| 108 | Barrackpore | AITC | Raj Chakraborty | BJP | Dr. Chandramani Shukla | CPI(M) | Debasish Bhowmick | 22 April 2021 |
| 109 | Khardaha | AITC | Kajal Sinha | BJP | Shilbhadra Dutta | CPI(M) | Debojyoti Das | 22 April 2021 |
| 110 | Dum Dum Uttar | AITC | Chandrima Bhattacharya | BJP | Archana Majumdar | CPI(M) | Tanmoy Bhattacharya | 22 April 2021 |
| 111 | Panihati | AITC | Nirmal Ghosh | BJP | Sonmoy Bandopadhyay | INC | Tapas Mazumdar | 17 April 2021 |
| 112 | Kamarhati | AITC | Madan Mitra | BJP | Anindya Raju Banarjee | CPI(M) | Sayandip Mitra | 17 April 2021 |
| 113 | Baranagar | AITC | Tapas Roy | BJP | Parno Mittra | INC | Amal Kumar Mukhopadhyay | 17 April 2021 |
| 114 | Dum Dum | AITC | Bratya Basu | BJP | Bimal Shankar Nanda | CPI(M) | Palash Das | 17 April 2021 |
| 115 | Rajarhat New Town | AITC | Tapas Chatterjee | BJP | Bhaskar Roy | CPI(M) | Saptarshi Deb | 17 April 2021 |
| 116 | Bidhannagar | AITC | Sujit Bose | BJP | Sabyasachi Dutta | INC | Abhishek Bandopadhyay | 17 April 2021 |
| 117 | Rajarhat Gopalpur | AITC | Aditi Munsi | BJP | Samik Bhattacharya | CPI(M) | Subhajit Dasgupta | 17 April 2021 |
| 118 | Madhyamgram | AITC | Rathin Ghosh | BJP | Rajashree Rajbanshi | RSMP | Biswajit Maity | 17 April 2021 |
| 119 | Barasat | AITC | Chiranjeet Chakraborty | BJP | Shankar Chaterjee | AIFB | Sanjib Chattopadhyay | 17 April 2021 |
| 120 | Deganga | AITC | Rahima Mondal | BJP | Deepika Chatterjee | RSMP | Karim Ali | 17 April 2021 |
| 121 | Haroa | AITC | Haji Sk. Nurul Islam | BJP | Rajendra Saha | RSMP | Kutubuddin Fatehi | 17 April 2021 |
| 122 | Minakhan | AITC | Usha Rani Mondal | BJP | Jayanta Mondal | CPI(M) | Pradyot Ray | 17 April 2021 |
| 123 | Sandeshkhali | AITC | Sukumar Mahata | BJP | Bhaskar Sardar | RSMP | Barun Mahato | 17 April 2021 |
| 124 | Basirhat Dakshin | AITC | Dr. Saptarshi Banerjee | BJP | Taraknath Ghosh | INC | Amit Majumder | 17 April 2021 |
| 125 | Basirhat Uttar | AITC | Rafikul Islam Mondal | BJP | Narayan Mondal | RSMP | Baijid Amin | 17 April 2021 |
| 126 | Hingalganj | AITC | Debes Mondal | BJP | Nimai Das | CPI | Dr. Ranjan Mondal | 17 April 2021 |
South 24 Parganas district
| 127 | Gosaba | AITC | Jayanta Naskar | BJP | Chitta Pramanik | RSP | Anil Chandra Mondal | 1 April 2021 |
| 128 | Basanti | AITC | Shyamal Mondal | BJP | Ramesh Maji | RSP | Subhas Naskar | 6 April 2021 |
| 129 | Kultali | AITC | Ganesh Chandra Mondal | BJP | Mintu Haldar | CPI(M) | Ram Shankar Haldar | 6 April 2021 |
| 130 | Patharpratima | AITC | Samir Kumar Jana | BJP | Ashit Haldar | INC | Sukhdeb Bera | 1 April 2021 |
| 131 | Kakdwip | AITC | Manturam Pakhira | BJP | Deepankar Jana | INC | Indranil Raut | 1 April 2021 |
| 132 | Sagar | AITC | Bankim Chandra Hazra | BJP | Bikash Kamila | CPI(M) | Sk. Mukuleshwar Rahman | 1 April 2021 |
| 133 | Kulpi | AITC | Jogaranjan Halder | BJP | Pranab Mallik | RSMP | Shirajuddin Gazi | 6 April 2021 |
| 134 | Raidighi | AITC | Alok Jaldata | BJP | Shantanu Bapuli | CPI(M) | Kanti Ganguly | 6 April 2021 |
| 135 | Mandirbazar | AITC | Jaydeb Halder | BJP | Dilip Jatuwa | RSMP | Sanjay Sarkar | 6 April 2021 |
| 136 | Jaynagar | AITC | Biswanath Das | BJP | Rabin Sardar | CPI(M) | Apurba Pramanik | 6 April 2021 |
| 137 | Baruipur Purba | AITC | Bibhas Sardar | BJP | Chandan Mandal | CPI(M) | Swapan Naskar | 6 April 2021 |
| 138 | Canning Paschim | AITC | Paresh Ram Das | BJP | Arnab Roy | INC | Pratap Mondal | 6 April 2021 |
| 139 | Canning Purba | AITC | Saokat Molla | BJP | Kalipada Naskar | RSMP | Gazi Sahabuddin Siraj | 6 April 2021 |
| 140 | Baruipur Paschim | AITC | Biman Banerjee | BJP | Debapam Chaatopadhyay | CPI(M) | Lahek Ali | 6 April 2021 |
| 141 | Magrahat Purba | AITC | Namita Saha | BJP | Chandan Naskar | CPI(M) | Chandan Saha | 6 April 2021 |
| 142 | Magrahat Paschim | AITC | Giasuddin Molla | BJP | Manash Saha | RSMP | Maidul Islam | 6 April 2021 |
| 143 | Diamond Harbour | AITC | Pannalal Halder | BJP | Dipak Haldar | CPI(M) | Pratik Ur Rahman | 6 April 2021 |
| 144 | Falta | AITC | Sankar Kumar Naskar | BJP | Bidhan Parui | INC | Abdur Rezzak Molla | 6 April 2021 |
| 145 | Satgachia | AITC | Mohan Chandra Naskar | BJP | Chandan Paul Das | CPI(M) | Goutam Paul | 6 April 2021 |
| 146 | Bishnupur (S 24) | AITC | Dilip Mondal | BJP | Agnishwar Naskar | CPI(M) | Jhuma Kayal | 6 April 2021 |
| 147 | Sonarpur Dakshin | AITC | Arundhuti Moitra | BJP | Anjana Basu | CPI | Shuvam Banerjee | 10 April 2021 |
| 148 | Bhangar | AITC | Md. Rezaul Karim | BJP | Soumi Hati | RSMP | Naushad Siddiqui | 10 April 2021 |
| 149 | Kasba | AITC | Javed Ahmed Khan | BJP | Indranil Khan | CPI(M) | Shatarup Ghosh | 10 April 2021 |
| 150 | Jadavpur | AITC | Moloy Majumder | BJP | Rinku Naskar | CPI(M) | Sujan Chakraborty | 10 April 2021 |
| 151 | Sonarpur Uttar | AITC | Firdousi Begum | BJP | Ranjan Baidya | CPI(M) | Monalisa Sinha | 10 April 2021 |
| 152 | Tollygunge | AITC | Aroop Biswas | BJP | Babul Supriyo | CPI(M) | Debdut Ghosh | 10 April 2021 |
| 153 | Behala Purba | AITC | Ratna Chatterjee | BJP | Payel Sarkar | CPI(M) | Samita Har Chowdhury | 10 April 2021 |
| 154 | Behala Paschim | AITC | Partha Chatterjee | BJP | Srabanti Chatterjee | CPI(M) | Nihar Bhakta | 10 April 2021 |
| 155 | Maheshtala | AITC | Dulal Chandra Das | BJP | Umesh Das | CPI(M) | Pradyut Chowdhury | 10 April 2021 |
| 156 | Budge Budge | AITC | Ashok Deb | BJP | Tarun Adak | INC | Sk. Mujibar Rahman | 10 April 2021 |
| 157 | Metiaburuz | AITC | Abdul Khaleque Molla | BJP | Ramji Prasad | RSMP | Nurujjaman | 10 April 2021 |
Kolkata district
| 158 | Kolkata Port | AITC | Firhad Hakim | BJP | Awad Kishore Gupta | INC | Md. Muktar | 26 April 2021 |
| 159 | Bhabanipur | AITC | Sovandeb Chattopadhyay | BJP | Rudranil Ghosh | INC | Md. Shadab Khan | 26 April 2021 |
| 160 | Rashbehari | AITC | Debasish Kumar | BJP | Lt. Gen Subrata Saha | INC | Ashutosh Chatterjee | 26 April 2021 |
| 161 | Ballygunge | AITC | Subrata Mukherjee | BJP | Loknath Chatterjee | CPI(M) | Dr. Fuad Halim | 26 April 2021 |
| 162 | Chowrangee | AITC | Nayana Bandopadhyay | BJP | Devdutta Maji | INC | Santosh Pathak | 29 April 2021 |
| 163 | Entally | AITC | Swarna Kamal Saha | BJP | Priyanka Tibrewal | RSMP | Md. Iqbal Alam | 29 April 2021 |
| 164 | Beleghata | AITC | Paresh Paul | BJP | Adv. Kashinath Biswas | CPI(M) | Rajib Biswas | 29 April 2021 |
| 165 | Jorasanko | AITC | Vivek Gupta | BJP | Mina Devi Purohit | INC | Janab Ajmal Khan | 29 April 2021 |
| 166 | Shyampukur | AITC | Sashi Panja | BJP | Sandipan Biswas | AIFB | Jiban Prakash Saha | 29 April 2021 |
| 167 | Maniktala | AITC | Sadhan Pande | BJP | Kalyan Chaubey | CPI(M) | Rupa Bagchi | 29 April 2021 |
| 168 | Kashipur-Belgachia | AITC | Atin Ghosh | BJP | Shivaji Singha Roy | CPI(M) | Pratip Dasgupta | 29 April 2021 |
Howrah district
| 169 | Bally | AITC | Rana Chatterjee | BJP | Baishali Dalmiya | CPI(M) | Dipsita Dhar | 10 April 2021 |
| 170 | Howrah Uttar | AITC | Goutam Chowdhury | BJP | Umesh Rai | CPI(M) | Pawan Singh | 10 April 2021 |
| 171 | Howrah Madhya | AITC | Arup Roy | BJP | Sanjay Singh | INC | Palash Bhandary | 10 April 2021 |
| 172 | Shibpur | AITC | Manoj Tiwary | BJP | Rathindranath Chakraborty | AIFB | Dr. Jagannath Bhattacharya | 10 April 2021 |
| 173 | Howrah Dakshin | AITC | Nandita Chowdhury | BJP | Rantideb Sengupta | CPI(M) | Sumitra Adhikari | 10 April 2021 |
| 174 | Sankrail | AITC | Priya Paul | BJP | Prabakar Pandit | CPI(M) | Samir Malik | 10 April 2021 |
| 175 | Panchla | AITC | Gulsan Mallick | BJP | Mohit Ghanti | RSMP | Md. Jaleel | 10 April 2021 |
| 176 | Uluberia Purba | AITC | Bidesh Bose | BJP | Pratyush Mondal | RSMP | Abbasuddin Khan | 10 April 2021 |
| 177 | Uluberia Uttar | AITC | Dr. Nirmal Maji | BJP | Chiran Bera | CPI(M) | Ashok Dolui | 6 April 2021 |
| 178 | Uluberia Dakshin | AITC | Pulak Roy | BJP | Papia Dey (Adhikari) | AIFB | Kutubuddin Ahmed | 6 April 2021 |
| 179 | Shyampur | AITC | Kalipada Mandal | BJP | Tanusree Chakraborty | INC | Amitabha Chakraborty | 6 April 2021 |
| 180 | Bagnan | AITC | Arunava Sen | BJP | Anupam Mallik | CPI(M) | Bashir Ahmed | 6 April 2021 |
| 181 | Amta | AITC | Sukanto Paul | BJP | Debtanu Bhattacharya | INC | Asit Mitra | 6 April 2021 |
| 182 | Udaynarayanpur | AITC | Samir Kumar Panja | BJP | Sumit Ranjan Karar | INC | Alok Koley | 6 April 2021 |
| 183 | Jagatballavpur | AITC | Sitanath Ghosh | BJP | Anupam Ghosh | RSMP | Sk. Sabbir Ahmed | 6 April 2021 |
| 184 | Domjur | AITC | Kalyan Ghosh | BJP | Rajib Banerjee | CPI(M) | Uttam Bera | 10 April 2021 |
Hooghly district
| 185 | Uttarpara | AITC | Kanchan Mullick | BJP | Prabir Ghoshal | CPI(M) | Rajat Banerjee | 10 April 2021 |
| 186 | Sreerampur | AITC | Sudipto Roy | BJP | Kabir Sankar Bose | INC | Alok Ranjan Banerjee | 10 April 2021 |
| 187 | Champdani | AITC | Arindam Guin | BJP | Dilip Singh | INC | Abdul Mannan | 10 April 2021 |
| 188 | Singur | AITC | Becharam Manna | BJP | Rabindranath Bhattacharjee | CPI(M) | Srijan Bhattacharya | 10 April 2021 |
| 189 | Chandannagar | AITC | Indranil Sen | BJP | Deepanjan Ghuha | CPI(M) | Goutam Sarkar | 10 April 2021 |
| 190 | Chunchura | AITC | Asit Mazumdar | BJP | Locket Chatterjee | AIFB | Dr. Pranab Ghosh | 10 April 2021 |
| 191 | Balagarh | AITC | Monoranjan Byapari | BJP | Subhas Chandra Haldar | CPI(M) | Mahamaya Mondal | 10 April 2021 |
| 192 | Pandua | AITC | Dr. Ratna De Nag | BJP | Partha Sharma | CPI(M) | Sk. Amjad Hossain | 10 April 2021 |
| 193 | Saptagram | AITC | Tapan Dasgupta | BJP | Debbrata Biswas (Baban) | INC | Pabitra Deb | 10 April 2021 |
| 194 | Chanditala | AITC | Swati Khandoker | BJP | Yash Dasgupta | CPI(M) | Mohammed Salim | 10 April 2021 |
| 195 | Jangipara | AITC | Snehashis Chakraborty | BJP | Debjit Sarkar | RSMP | Sk. Moinuddin (Budo) | 6 April 2021 |
| 196 | Haripal | AITC | Karabi Manna | BJP | Samiran Mitra | RSMP | Simal Soren | 6 April 2021 |
| 197 | Dhanekhali | AITC | Ashima Patra | BJP | Tushar Majumdar | INC | Anirban Saha | 6 April 2021 |
| 198 | Tarakeswar | AITC | Ramendu Singha Roy | BJP | Swapan Dasgupta | CPI(M) | Surajit Ghosh | 6 April 2021 |
| 199 | Pursurah | AITC | Dilip Yadav | BJP | Biman Ghosh | INC | Monika Mallick Ghosh | 6 April 2021 |
| 200 | Arambagh | AITC | Sujata Mondal Khan | BJP | Madhusudhan Bag | CPI(M) | Sakti Mohan Malik | 6 April 2021 |
| 201 | Goghat | AITC | Manas Mazumder | BJP | Biswanath Karak | AIFB | Shivprasad Malik | 6 April 2021 |
| 202 | Khanakul | AITC | Munsi Nazbul Karim | BJP | Susanta Ghosh | RSMP | Faisal Khan | 6 April 2021 |
Purba Medinipur district
| 203 | Tamluk | AITC | Soumen Mahapatra | BJP | Harekrishna Bera | CPI | Goutam Panda | 1 April 2021 |
| 204 | Panskura Purba | AITC | Biplab Roychowdhury | BJP | Debabrata Patnayak | CPI(M) | Sk. Ibrahim Ali | 1 April 2021 |
| 205 | Panskura Paschim | AITC | Firoza Bibi | BJP | Shintu Senapati | CPI | Chittaranjan Das Thakur | 1 April 2021 |
| 206 | Moyna | AITC | Sangram Kumar Dolui | BJP | Ashoke Dinda | INC | Manik Bhownik | 1 April 2021 |
| 207 | Nandakumar | AITC | Sukumar Dey | BJP | Nilanjan Adhikari | CPI(M) | Karuna Shankar Bhowmick | 1 April 2021 |
| 208 | Mahisadal | AITC | Tilak Chakraborty | BJP | Biswanath Banarjee | RSMP | Bikram Chatterjee | 1 April 2021 |
| 209 | Haldia | AITC | Swapan Naskar | BJP | Tapasi Mondal | CPI(M) | Manika Kar Paik | 1 April 2021 |
| 210 | Nandigram | AITC | Mamata Banerjee | BJP | Suvendu Adhikari | CPI(M) | Minakshi Mukherjee | 1 April 2021 |
| 211 | Chandipur | AITC | Soham Chakraborty | BJP | Pulak Kanti Guriya | CPI(M) | Ashish Guchhait | 1 April 2021 |
| 212 | Patashpur | AITC | Uttam Basak | BJP | Ambujaksha Mahanti | CPI | Saikat Giri | 27 March 2021 |
| 213 | Kanthi Uttar | AITC | Tarun Kumar Jana | BJP | Sunita Singha | CPI(M) | Sutanu Maity | 27 March 2021 |
| 214 | Bhagabanpur | AITC | Ardhendu Maity | BJP | Rabindranath Maity | INC | Shiu Maiti | 27 March 2021 |
| 215 | Khejuri | AITC | Parthapratim Das | BJP | Santanu Pramanik | CPI(M) | Himangshu Das | 27 March 2021 |
| 216 | Kanthi Dakshin | AITC | Jyotirmoy Kar | BJP | Arup Kumar Das | CPI | Anulup Panda | 27 March 2021 |
| 217 | Ramnagar | AITC | Akhil Giri | BJP | Swadesh Ranjan Nayak | CPI(M) | Sabyasachi Jana | 27 March 2021 |
| 218 | Egra | AITC | Tarun Maity | BJP | Arup Das | INC | Manas Kumar Karmahapatra | 27 March 2021 |
Paschim Medinipur district
| 219 | Dantan | AITC | Bikram Chandra Pradhan | BJP | Sakti Pada Nayak | CPI | Sisir Patra | 27 March 2021 |
Jhargram district
| 220 | Nayagram | AITC | Dulal Murmu | BJP | Bakul Murmu | CPI(M) | Haripada Soren | 27 March 2021 |
| 221 | Gopiballavpur | AITC | Khagendranath Mahato | BJP | Sanjit Mahato | CPI(M) | Prashanta Das | 27 March 2021 |
| 222 | Jhargram | AITC | Birbaha Hansda | BJP | Sukhmoy Satpati | CPI(M) | Madhuja Sen Roy | 27 March 2021 |
Paschim Medinipur district
| 223 | Keshiary | AITC | Paresh Murmu | BJP | Sonali Murmu | CPI(M) | Pulin Bihari Baske | 27 March 2021 |
| 224 | Kharagpur Sadar | AITC | Pradip Sarkar | BJP | Hiranmoy Chattopadhyaya | INC | Reeta Sharma | 1 April 2021 |
| 225 | Narayangarh | AITC | Suryakanta Atta | BJP | Ramprasad Giri | CPI(M) | Tapas Sinha | 1 April 2021 |
| 226 | Sabang | AITC | Manas Bhunia | BJP | Amulya Maity | INC | Chiranjib Bhowmik | 1 April 2021 |
| 227 | Pingla | AITC | Ajit Maity | BJP | Antara Bhattacharya | INC | Samir Roy | 1 April 2021 |
| 228 | Kharagpur | AITC | Dinen Ray | BJP | Tapan Bhuiya | CPI(M) | Sk. Saddam Ali | 27 March 2021 |
| 229 | Debra | AITC | Humayun Kabir | BJP | Bharati Ghosh | CPI(M) | Prankrishna Mondal | 1 April 2021 |
| 230 | Daspur | AITC | Mamata Bhunia | BJP | Prashanth Bera | CPI(M) | Dhrubasekhar Mondal | 1 April 2021 |
| 231 | Ghatal | AITC | Shankar Dolui | BJP | Shital Kapat | CPI(M) | Kamal Dolui | 1 April 2021 |
| 232 | Chandrakona | AITC | Arup Dhara | BJP | Shibram Das | RSMP | Gouranga Das | 1 April 2021 |
| 233 | Garbeta | AITC | Uttara Singha | BJP | Madan Ruidas | CPI(M) | Tapan Ghosh | 27 March 2021 |
| 234 | Salboni | AITC | Srikanta Mahata | BJP | Rajib Kundu | CPI(M) | Susanta Ghosh | 27 March 2021 |
| 235 | Keshpur | AITC | Siuli Saha | BJP | Pritish Ranjan | CPI(M) | Rameshwar Dolui | 1 April 2021 |
| 236 | Medinipur | AITC | June Malia | BJP | Shamit Dash | CPI | Tarun Kumar Ghosh | 27 March 2021 |
Jhargram district
| 237 | Binpur | AITC | Debnath Hansda | BJP | Palan Saren | CPI(M) | Dibakar Hansda | 27 March 2021 |
Purulia district
| 238 | Bandwan | AITC | Rajib Lochan Saren | BJP | Parsi Murmu | CPI(M) | Sushanta Besra | 27 March 2021 |
| 239 | Balarampur | AITC | Shantiram Mahato | BJP | Baneswar Mahato | INC | Uttam Banerjee | 27 March 2021 |
| 240 | Baghmundi | AITC | Sushanta Mahato | AJSU | Ashutosh Mahato | INC | Nepal Mahata | 27 March 2021 |
| 241 | Joypur | IND | Dibyojyoti Singh Deo | BJP | Narahari Mahato | AIFB | Dhiren Mahato | 27 March 2021 |
| 242 | Purulia | AITC | Sujoy Banerjee | BJP | Sudip Mukherjee | INC | Partha Prathim Banerjee | 27 March 2021 |
| 243 | Manbazar | AITC | Sandhya Rani Tudu | BJP | Gouri Singh Sardar | CPI(M) | Jaminikanta Mandi | 27 March 2021 |
| 244 | Kashipur | AITC | Swapan Kumar Beltharia | BJP | Kamalakanta Hansda | CPI(M) | Mallika Mahata | 27 March 2021 |
| 245 | Para | AITC | Umapada Bauri | BJP | Nadia Chand Bauri | CPI(M) | Swapan Bauri | 27 March 2021 |
| 246 | Raghunathpur | AITC | Hazari Bauri | BJP | Bivekananda Bauri | CPI(M) | Ganesh Bauri | 27 March 2021 |
Bankura district
| 247 | Saltora | AITC | Santosh Mondal | BJP | Chandana Bauri | CPI(M) | Nandadulal Bauri | 27 March 2021 |
| 248 | Chhatna | AITC | Subhasis Batabyal | BJP | Satyanarayan Mukherjee | RSP | Falguni Mukherjee | 27 March 2021 |
| 249 | Ranibandh | AITC | Jyostna Mandi | BJP | Khudiram Tudu | CPI(M) | Deblina Hembram | 27 March 2021 |
| 250 | Raipur | AITC | Mrittunjay Murmu | BJP | Sudhangsu Hansda | RSMP | Milan Mandi | 27 March 2021 |
| 251 | Taldangra | AITC | Arup Chakraborty | BJP | Shyamal Kumar Sarkar | CPI(M) | Manoranjan Patra | 1 April 2021 |
| 252 | Bankura | AITC | Sayantika Banerjee | BJP | Niladri Sekhar Dana | INC | Radha Rani Banerjee | 1 April 2021 |
| 253 | Barjora | AITC | Alok Mukherjee | BJP | Supriti Chatterji | CPI(M) | Sujit Chakraborty | 1 April 2021 |
| 254 | Onda | AITC | Arup Kumar Khan | BJP | Amar Sakha | AIFB | Tarapada Chakraborty | 1 April 2021 |
| 255 | Bishnupur (Bankura) | AITC | Archita Bid | BJP | Tanmoy Ghosh | INC | Debu Chatterjee | 1 April 2021 |
| 256 | Katulpur | AITC | Sangeeta Malik | BJP | Harkali Patihar | INC | Akshay Santra | 1 April 2021 |
| 257 | Indas | AITC | Runu Mete | BJP | Nirmal Dhara | CPI(M) | Nayan Sil | 1 April 2021 |
| 258 | Sonamukhi | AITC | Shyamal Santra | BJP | Dibakar Ghourmi | CPI(M) | Ajit Roy | 1 April 2021 |
Purba Bardhaman district
| 259 | Khandaghosh | AITC | Nabin Chandra Bag | BJP | Bijon Mondal | CPI(M) | Ashima Roy | 17 April 2021 |
| 260 | Bardhaman Dakshin | AITC | Khokon Das | BJP | Sandip Nandi | CPI(M) | Pritha Ta | 17 April 2021 |
| 261 | Raina | AITC | Shampa Dhara | BJP | Manik Roy | CPI(M) | Basudev Khan | 17 April 2021 |
| 262 | Jamalpur | AITC | Alok Kumar Majhi | BJP | Balaram Bapari | MFB (Note: Samar Hazra is a member of the Marxist Forward Bloc, however he is contesting the election as a CPIM candidate) | Samar Hazra | 17 April 2021 |
| 263 | Manteswar | AITC | Siddiqulla Chowdhury | BJP | Saikat Panja | CPI(M) | Anupam Ghosh | 17 April 2021 |
| 264 | Kalna | AITC | Deboprasad Bag | BJP | Bishwajit Kundu | CPI(M) | Nirab Khan | 17 April 2021 |
| 265 | Memari | AITC | Madhusudan Bhattacharya | BJP | Bhismadeb Bhattacharya | CPI(M) | Sanat Banerjee | 17 April 2021 |
| 266 | Bardhaman Uttar | AITC | Nisith Kumar Malik | BJP | Radhakanta Roy | CPI(M) | Chandi Charan Let | 17 April 2021 |
| 267 | Bhatar | AITC | Mangobindo Adhikary | BJP | Mahendra Konar | CPI(M) | Najrul Haque | 22 April 2021 |
| 268 | Purbasthali Dakshin | AITC | Swapan Debnath | BJP | Rajib Kumar Bhowmik | INC | Abhijit Bhattacharya | 22 April 2021 |
| 269 | Purbasthali Uttar | AITC | Tapan Chatterjee | BJP | Gobardhan Das | CPI(M) | Pradip Kumar Saha | 22 April 2021 |
| 270 | Katwa | AITC | Rabindranath Chatterjee | BJP | Shyama Majumdar | INC | Prabir Gangopadhyay | 22 April 2021 |
| 271 | Ketugram | AITC | Sekh Sahonawez | BJP | Mathura Ghosh | CPI(M) | Mizanur Rahman | 22 April 2021 |
| 272 | Mangalkot | AITC | Apurba Chowdhury | BJP | Rana Pratap Goswami | CPI(M) | Shah Jahan Chowdhury | 22 April 2021 |
| 273 | Ausgram | AITC | Abhedananda Thander | BJP | Kalita Majhi | CPI(M) | Chanchal Majhi | 22 April 2021 |
| 274 | Galsi | AITC | Nepal Ghorui | BJP | Bikash Biswas | AIFB | Nanda Pandit | 22 April 2021 |
Paschim Bardhaman district
| 275 | Pandaveswar | AITC | Narendranath Chakraborty | BJP | Jitendra Tiwari | CPI(M) | Subhas Bauri | 26 April 2021 |
| 276 | Durgapur Purba | AITC | Pradip Majumder | BJP | Col.Diptangshu Chaudhury | CPI(M) | Abhas Raychowdhury | 26 April 2021 |
| 277 | Durgapur Paschim | AITC | Biswanath Parial | BJP | Lakshman Ghorai | INC | Debesh Chakraborty | 26 April 2021 |
| 278 | Raniganj | AITC | Tapas Banerjee | BJP | Dr. Bijan Mukherjee | CPI(M) | Hemant Pravakar | 26 April 2021 |
| 279 | Jamuria | AITC | Hareram Singh | BJP | Tapas Roy | CPI(M) | Aishe Ghosh | 26 April 2021 |
| 280 | Asansol Dakshin | AITC | Saayoni Ghosh | BJP | Agnimitra Paul | CPI(M) | Prashanta Ghosh | 26 April 2021 |
| 281 | Asansol Uttar | AITC | Moloy Ghatak | BJP | Krishnendu Mukherjee | RSMP | Md. Mustakin | 26 April 2021 |
| 282 | Kulti | AITC | Ujjal Chatterjee | BJP | Dr. Ajoy Poddar | INC | Chandidas Chatterjee | 26 April 2021 |
| 283 | Barabani | AITC | Bidhan Upadhyay | BJP | Arijit Roy | INC | Ranendra Bath Bagchi | 26 April 2021 |
Birbhum district
| 284 | Dubrajpur | AITC | Debabrata Saha | BJP | Anup Kumar Saha | AIFB | Bijoy Bagdi | 29 April 2021 |
| 285 | Suri | AITC | Bikash Roy Chowdhury | BJP | Jagannath Chattopadhyay | INC | Chanchal Chatterjee | 29 April 2021 |
| 286 | Bolpur | AITC | Chandranath Singha | BJP | Anirban Ganguly | RSP | Tapan Hore | 29 April 2021 |
| 287 | Nanoor | AITC | Bidhan Chandra Majhi | BJP | Tarak Saha | CPI(M) | Shyamali Pradhan | 29 April 2021 |
| 288 | Labpur | AITC | Abhijit Sinha | BJP | Biswajit Mondal | CPI(M) | Syed Mahfuzul Karim | 29 April 2021 |
| 289 | Sainthia | AITC | Nilabati Saha | BJP | Piya Saha | CPI(M) | Mausumi Konai | 29 April 2021 |
| 290 | Mayureswar | AITC | Abhijit Roy | BJP | Shyamapada Mondal | RSMP | Kashinath Pal | 29 April 2021 |
| 291 | Rampurhat | AITC | Dr.Asish Banerjee | BJP | Subhasis Choudhury | CPI(M) | Sanjib Barman | 29 April 2021 |
| 292 | Hansan | AITC | Ashok Kumar Chattopadhay | BJP | Nikhil Banerjee | INC | Miltan Rashid | 29 April 2021 |
| 293 | Nalhati | AITC | Rajendra Prasad Singh | BJP | Tapas Kumar Yadav | AIFB | Dipak Chatterjee | 29 April 2021 |
| 294 | Murarai | AITC | Mosaraf Hossain | BJP | Debashis Roy | INC | Md. Asif Iqbal | 29 April 2021 |
