= Results of the 2021 West Bengal Legislative Assembly election =

This is a list of constituency wise results of 2021 West Bengal Legislative Assembly election.

== Constituency Wise Results ==
| Assembly Constituency | | Winner | | | | Runner-up | | | | Margin | Voting date |
| # | Name | Party | Candidate | Votes | % | Party | Candidate | Votes | % | Margin | Voting date |
|---|---|---|---|---|---|---|---|---|---|---|---|
Cooch Behar district
| 1 | Mekliganj (SC) | AITC | Paresh Chandra Adhikary | 99338 | 49.98 | BJP | Dadhiram Ray | 84653 | 42.59 | 14685 | 10 April 2021 |
| 2 | Mathabhanga (SC) | BJP | Sushil Barman | 113249 | 52.87 | AITC | Girindra Nath Barman | 87115 | 40.67 | 26134 | 10 April 2021 |
| 3 | Cooch Behar Uttar (SC) | BJP | Sukumar Roy | 120483 | 49.40 | AITC | Binay Krishna Barman | 105868 | 43.40 | 14615 | 10 April 2021 |
| 4 | Cooch Behar Dakshin | BJP | Nikhil Ranjan Dey | 96629 | 46.83 | AITC | Avijit De Bhowmik | 91830 | 44.31 | 4799 | 10 April 2021 |
| 5 | Sitalkuchi (SC) | BJP | Baren Chandra Barman | 124955 | 50.80 | AITC | Partha Pratim Ray | 107140 | 43.56 | 17815 | 10 April 2021 |
| 6 | Sitai (SC) | AITC | Jagadish Chandra Barma Basunia | 117908 | 49.42 | BJP | Dipak Kumar Roy | 107796 | 45.18 | 10112 | 10 April 2021 |
| 7 | Dinhata | BJP | Nisith Pramanik | 116035 | 47.60 | AITC | Udayan Guha | 115978 | 47.58 | 57 | 10 April 2021 |
| 8 | Natabari | BJP | Mihir Goswami | 111743 | 51.45 | AITC | Rabindra Nath Ghosh | 88303 | 40.66 | 23440 | 10 April 2021 |
| 9 | Tufanganj | BJP | Malati Rava Roy | 114503 | 54.69 | AITC | Pranab Kumar Dey | 83305 | 39.79 | 31198 | 10 April 2021 |
Alipurduar district
| 10 | Kumargram (ST) | BJP | Manoj Kumar Oraon | 111974 | 48.16 | AITC | Leos Kujar | 100973 | 43.43 | 11001 | 10 April 2021 |
| 11 | Kalchini (ST) | BJP | Bishal Lama | 103104 | 52.65 | AITC | Pasang Lama | 74528 | 38.06 | 28576 | 10 April 2021 |
| 12 | Alipurduars | BJP | Suman Kanjilal | 107333 | 48.19 | AITC | Sourav Chakraborty | 91326 | 41.00 | 16007 | 10 April 2021 |
| 13 | Falakata | BJP | Dipak Barman | 102993 | 46.71 | AITC | Subhash Chanda Roy | 99003 | 44.90 | 3990 | 10 April 2021 |
| 14 | Madarihat | BJP | Manoj Tigga | 90718 | 54.35 | AITC | Rajesh Lakra | 61033 | 36.56 | 29685 | 10 April 2021 |
Jalpaiguri district
| 15 | Dhupguri (SC) | BJP | Bishnu Pada Ray | 104688 | 45.64 | AITC | Mitali Roy | 100333 | 43.75 | 4355 | 17 April 2021 |
| 16 | Maynaguri (SC) | BJP | Kaushik Roy | 115306 | 48.84 | AITC | Manoj Roy | 103395 | 43.79 | 11911 | 17 April 2021 |
| 17 | Jalpaiguri (SC) | AITC | Pradip Kumar Barma | 95668 | 42.34 | BJP | Sujit Singha | 94727 | 41.93 | 941 | 17 April 2021 |
| 18 | Rajganj (SC) | AITC | Khageswar Roy | 104641 | 48.5 | BJP | Supen Roy | 88868 | 41.19 | 15773 | 17 April 2021 |
| 19 | Dabgram-Phulbari | BJP | Sikha Chatteree | 129088 | 49.85 | AITC | Goutam Deb | 101495 | 39.19 | 27593 | 17 April 2021 |
| 20 | Mal (ST) | AITC | Bulu Chik Baraik | 99086 | 46.46 | BJP | Mahesh Bagey | 93621 | 43.9 | 5465 | 17 April 2021 |
| 21 | Nagrakata (ST) | BJP | Puna Bhengra | 70945 | 47.78 | AITC | Joseph Munda | 56543 | 38.08 | 14402 | 17 April 2021 |
Kalimpong district
| 22 | Kalimpong | GJM (Tamang) | Ruden Sada Lepcha | 58206 | 37.59 | BJP | Suva Pradhan | 54336 | 35.09 | 3870 | 17 April 2021 |
Darjeeling district
| 23 | Darjeeling | BJP | Neeraj Zimba | 68907 | 40.88 | GJM (Tamang) | Keshav Raj Sharma | 47631 | 28.26 | 21726 | 17 April 2021 |
| 24 | Kurseong | BJP | Bishnu Prasad Sharma | 73475 | 41.86 | GJM (Tamang) | Tshering Lama Dahal | 57960 | 33.02 | 15515 | 17 April 2021 |
| 25 | Matigara-Naxalbari (SC) | BJP | Anandamoy Barman | 139785 | 58.10 | AITC | Rajen Sundas | 68454 | 28.65 | 70848 | 17 April 2021 |
| 26 | Siliguri | BJP | Shankar Ghosh | 89370 | 50.03 | AITC | Om Prakash Mishra | 53784 | 30.11 | 35586 | 17 April 2021 |
| 27 | Phansidewa (ST) | BJP | Durga Murmu | 105651 | 50.89 | AITC | Choton Kisku | 77940 | 37.55 | 27711 | 17 April 2021 |
Uttar Dinajpur district
| 28 | Chopra | AITC | Hamidul Rahaman | 124923 | 61.2 | BJP | Md. Shahin Akhtar | 59604 | 29.4 | 65319 | 22 April 2021 |
| 29 | Islampur | AITC | Abdul Karim Chowdhury | 100131 | 58.91 | BJP | Saumya Roop Mandal | 62691 | 36.88 | 37440 | 22 April 2021 |
| 30 | Goalpokhar | AITC | Md. Ghulam Rabbani | 105649 | 65.4 | BJP | Gulam Sarwar | 32135 | 19.89 | 73514 | 22 April 2021 |
| 31 | Chakulia | AITC | Minhajul Arfin Azad | 86311 | 49.78 | BJP | Sachin Prasad | 52474 | 30.26 | 33837 | 22 April 2021 |
| 32 | Karandighi | AITC | Goutam Pal | 116594 | 54.7 | BJP | Subhash Singha | 79968 | 37.52 | 36626 | 22 April 2021 |
| 33 | Hemtabad (SC) | AITC | Satyajit Burman | 116425 | 52.14 | BJP | Chandima Roy | 89210 | 39.95 | 27215 | 22 April 2021 |
| 34 | Kaliaganj (SC) | BJP | Soumen Roy | 116768 | 48.71 | AITC | Tapan Dev Singha | 94948 | 39.61 | 21820 | 22 April 2021 |
| 35 | Raiganj | BJP | Krishna Kalyani | 79775 | 49.44 | AITC | Kanaia Lal Agarwal | 59027 | 36.58 | 20748 | 22 April 2021 |
| 36 | Itahar | AITC | Mosaraf Hossain | 114645 | 59.10 | BJP | Amit Kumar Kundu | 70670 | 36.43 | 43975 | 22 April 2021 |
Dakshin Dinajpur district
| 37 | Kushmandi (SC) | AITC | Rekha Roy | 89968 | 48.88 | BJP | Ranjit Kumar Roy | 77384 | 42.08 | 12584 | 26 April 2021 |
| 38 | Kumarganj | AITC | Toraf Hossain Mondal | 89117 | 52.58 | BJP | Manas Sarkar | 59736 | 35.24 | 29381 | 26 April 2021 |
| 39 | Balurghat | BJP | Ashok Lahiri | 70484 | 47.25 | AITC | Sekhar Dasgupta | 57585 | 38.60 | 12899 | 26 April 2021 |
| 40 | Tapan (ST) | BJP | Budhrai Tudu | 84381 | 45.29 | AITC | Kalpana Kisku | 82731 | 44.41 | 1650 | 26 April 2021 |
| 41 | Gangarampur (SC) | BJP | Satyendra Nath Ray | 88724 | 46.82 | AITC | Goutam Das | 84132 | 44.40 | 4592 | 26 April 2021 |
| 42 | Harirampur | AITC | Biplab Mitra | 96131 | 51.23 | BJP | Nilanjan Roy | 73459 | 39.15 | 22672 | 26 April 2021 |
Malda district
| 43 | Habibpur (ST) | BJP | Joyel Murmu | 94075 | 47.52 | AITC | Prodip Baskey | 74558 | 37.66 | 19517 | 26 April 2021 |
| 44 | Gazole (SC) | BJP | Chinmoy Deb Barman | 100655 | 45.5 | AITC | Basanti Barman | 98857 | 44.69 | 1798 | 26 April 2021 |
| 45 | Chanchal | AITC | Nihar Ranjan Ghosh | 115966 | 58.08 | BJP | Dipankar Ram | 48628 | 24.35 | 67338 | 26 April 2021 |
| 46 | Harishchandrapur | AITC | Tajmul Hossain | 122527 | 60.31 | BJP | Matibur Rahaman | 45054 | 22.18 | 77473 | 26 April 2021 |
| 47 | Malatipur | AITC | Abdur Rahim Boxi | 126157 | 68.02 | BJP | Mousumi Das | 34208 | 18.44 | 91949 | 26 April 2021 |
| 48 | Ratua | AITC | Samar Mukherjee | 130674 | 59.63 | BJP | Abhishek Singhania | 55024 | 25.11 | 75650 | 26 April 2021 |
| 49 | Manikchak | AITC | Sabitri Mitra | 110234 | 53.26 | BJP | Gour Chandra Mandal | 76356 | 36.89 | 33878 | 29 April 2021 |
| 50 | Maldaha | BJP | Gopal Chandra Saha | 93398 | 45.23 | AITC | Ujjwal Kumar Chowdhury | 77942 | 37.75 | 15456 | 29 April 2021 |
| 51 | English Bazar | BJP | Sreerupa Mitra Chaudhury | 107755 | 49.96 | AITC | Krishnendu Narayan Choudhury | 87656 | 40.64 | 20099 | 29 April 2021 |
| 52 | Mothabari | AITC | Yeasmin Sabina | 97397 | 59.70 | BJP | Shyamchand Ghosh | 40824 | 25.02 | 56573 | 29 April 2021 |
| 53 | Sujapur | AITC | Md. Abdul Ghani | 152445 | 73.44 | INC | Isha Khan Choudhury | 22282 | 10.73 | 130163 | 29 April 2021 |
| 54 | Baisnabnagar | AITC | Chandana Sarkar | 83061 | 39.81 | BJP | Swadhin Kumar Sarkar | 80590 | 38.62 | 2471 | 29 April 2021 |
Murshidabad district
| 55 | Farakka | AITC | Manirul Islam | 102319 | 54.89 | BJP | Hemanta Ghosh | 42374 | 22.73 | 59945 | 26 April 2021 |
| 56 | Samserganj (Note: Election postponed due to candidate's death before the scheduled date of poll) | AITC | Amirul Islam | 96417 | 51.13 | INC | Zaidur Rahaman | 70038 | 37.14 | 26379 | 30 September 2021 |
| 57 | Suti | AITC | Emani Biswas | 127351 | 58.87 | BJP | Koushik Das | 56650 | 26.19 | 70701 | 26 April 2021 |
| 58 | Jangipur | AITC | Jakir Hossain | 136444 | 68.82 | BJP | Sujit Das | 43964 | 22.17 | 92480 | 30 September 2021 |
| 59 | Raghunathganj | AITC | Akhruzzaman | 126834 | 66.59 | BJP | Golam Modaswer | 28521 | 14.97 | 98313 | 26 April 2021 |
| 60 | Sagardighi | AITC | Subrata Saha | 95189 | 50.95 | BJP | Mafuja Khatun | 44983 | 24.08 | 50206 | 26 April 2021 |
| 61 | Lalgola | AITC | Mohammad Ali | 107860 | 56.64 | INC | Abu Hena | 47153 | 24.76 | 60707 | 26 April 2021 |
| 62 | Bhagabangola | AITC | Idris Ali | 153795 | 68.05 | CPI(M) | Md Kamal Hossain | 47787 | 21.15 | 106008 | 26 April 2021 |
| 63 | Raninagar | AITC | Abdul Soumik Hossain | 134957 | 60.79 | INC | Firoza Begam | 55255 | 24.89 | 79702 | 26 April 2021 |
| 64 | Murshidabad | BJP | Gouri Shankar Ghosh | 95967 | 41.86 | AITC | Shaoni Singha Roy | 93476 | 40.78 | 2491 | 26 April 2021 |
| 65 | Nabagram (SC) | AITC | Kanai Chandra Mondal | 100455 | 48.18 | BJP | Mohan Halder | 64922 | 31.14 | 35533 | 26 April 2021 |
| 66 | Khargram (SC) | AITC | Ashis Marjit | 93255 | 50.15 | BJP | Aditya Moulik | 60682 | 32.64 | 32573 | 29 April 2021 |
| 67 | Burwan (SC) | AITC | Jiban Krishna Saha | 81890 | 46.32 | BJP | Amiya Kumar Das | 79141 | 44.76 | 2749 | 29 April 2021 |
| 68 | Kandi | AITC | Apurba Sarkar | 95399 | 51.16 | BJP | Goutam Roy | 57319 | 30.74 | 38080 | 29 April 2021 |
| 69 | Bharatpur | AITC | Humayun Kabir | 96226 | 50.90 | BJP | Iman Kalyan Mukherjee | 53143 | 28.11 | 43083 | 29 April 2021 |
| 70 | Rejinagar | AITC | Rabiul Alam Chowdhury | 118494 | 56.31 | BJP | Arabinda Biswas | 50226 | 23.87 | 68268 | 29 April 2021 |
| 71 | Beldanga | AITC | SK Hasanuzzaman | 112862 | 55.19 | BJP | Sumit Ghosh | 59030 | 28.86 | 53832 | 29 April 2021 |
| 72 | Baharampur | BJP | Subrata Maitra | 89340 | 45.21 | AITC | Naru Gopal Mukherjee | 62488 | 31.62 | 26852 | 29 April 2021 |
| 73 | Hariharpara | AITC | Niamot Sheikh | 102660 | 47.51 | INC | Mir Alamgir | 88594 | 41.00 | 14066 | 29 April 2021 |
| 74 | Naoda | AITC | Sahina Momtaz Khan | 117684 | 58.16 | BJP | Anupam Mandal | 43531 | 21.51 | 74153 | 29 April 2021 |
| 75 | Domkal | AITC | Jafikul Islam | 127671 | 56.45 | CPI(M) | Md Mostafizur Rahaman | 80442 | 35.57 | 47229 | 29 April 2021 |
| 76 | Jalangi | AITC | Abdur Razzak | 123840 | 55.74 | CPI(M) | Saiful Islam Molla | 44564 | 20.06 | 79276 | 29 April 2021 |
Nadia district
| 77 | Karimpur | AITC | Bimlendu Sinha Roy | 110911 | 50.07 | BJP | Samarendra Nath Ghosh | 87336 | 39.43 | 23575 | 22 April 2021 |
| 78 | Tehatta | AITC | Tapas Kumar Saha | 97848 | 44.86 | BJP | Ashutosh Paul | 90933 | 41.69 | 6915 | 22 April 2021 |
| 79 | Palashipara | AITC | Dr. Manik Bhattacharya | 110274 | 54.22 | BJP | Bibhash Chandra Mandal | 58938 | 28.98 | 51336 | 22 April 2021 |
| 80 | Kaliganj | AITC | Nasiruddin Ahamed | 111696 | 53.35 | BJP | Abhijit Ghosh | 64709 | 30.91 | 46987 | 22 April 2021 |
| 81 | Nakashipara | AITC | Kallol Khan | 104812 | 50.01 | BJP | Santanu Dey | 83541 | 39.86 | 21271 | 22 April 2021 |
| 82 | Chapra | AITC | Rukbanur Rahman | 73866 | 34.65 | IND | Jeber Sekh | 61748 | 28.97 | 12118 | 22 April 2021 |
| 83 | Krishnanagar Uttar | BJP | Mukul Roy | 109357 | 54.19 | AITC | Koushani Mukherjee | 74268 | 36.80 | 35089 | 22 April 2021 |
| 84 | Nabadwip | AITC | Pundarikakshya Saha | 102170 | 48.52 | BJP | Sidhartha Shankar Naskar | 83599 | 39.70 | 18571 | 22 April 2021 |
| 85 | Krishnanagar Dakshin | AITC | Ujjal Biswas | 91738 | 46.88 | BJP | Mahadev Sarkar | 82433 | 42.13 | 9305 | 22 April 2021 |
| 86 | Santipur | BJP | Jagannath Sarkar | 109722 | 49.94 | AITC | Ajoy Dey | 93844 | 42.72 | 15878 | 17 April 2021 |
| 87 | Ranaghat Uttar Paschim | BJP | Parthasarathi Chatterjee | 113637 | 50.91 | AITC | Sankar Singha | 90509 | 40.55 | 23128 | 17 April 2021 |
| 88 | Krishnaganj (SC) | BJP | Ashis Kumar Biswas | 117668 | 50.73 | AITC | Dr. Tapas Mandal | 96391 | 41.56 | 21277 | 17 April 2021 |
| 89 | Ranaghat Uttar Purba (SC) | BJP | Ashim Biswas | 116786 | 54.39 | AITC | Samir Kumar Poddar | 85004 | 39.59 | 31782 | 17 April 2021 |
| 90 | Ranaghat Dakshin (SC) | BJP | Mukut Mani Adhikari | 119260 | 49.34 | AITC | Barnali Dey Roy | 102745 | 42.51 | 16515 | 17 April 2021 |
| 91 | Chakdaha | BJP | Bankim Chandra Ghosh | 99368 | 46.86 | AITC | Subhankar Singha | 87688 | 41.35 | 11680 | 17 April 2021 |
| 92 | Kalyani (SC) | BJP | Ambika Roy | 97026 | 44.04 | AITC | Aniruddha Biswas | 94820 | 43.03 | 2206 | 17 April 2021 |
| 93 | Haringhata (SC) | BJP | Asim Kumar Sarkar | 97666 | 46.31 | AITC | Nilima Nag | 82466 | 39.11 | 15200 | 17 April 2021 |
North 24 Parganas district
| 94 | Bagda (SC) | BJP | Biswajit Das | 108111 | 49.41 | AITC | Paritosh Kumar Saha | 98319 | 44.94 | 9792 | 22 April 2021 |
| 95 | Bangaon Uttar (SC) | BJP | Ashok Kirtania | 97761 | 47.65 | AITC | Shyamal Roy | 87,273 | 42.54 | 10488 | 22 April 2021 |
| 96 | Bangaon Dakshin (SC) | BJP | Swapan Majumder | 97,828 | 47.07 | AITC | Alo Rani Sarkar | 95824 | 46.11 | 2004 | 22 April 2021 |
| 97 | Gaighata (SC) | BJP | Subrata Thakur | 100,808 | 47.27 | AITC | Narottam Biswas | 91,230 | 42.78 | 9578 | 22 April 2021 |
| 98 | Swarupnagar (SC) | AITC | Bina Mondal | 99,784 | 47.11 | BJP | Brindaban Sarkar | 64,984 | 30.68 | 34800 | 22 April 2021 |
| 99 | Baduria | AITC | Abdur Rahim Quazi | 109,701 | 51.53 | BJP | Sukalyan Baidya | 53,257 | 25.02 | 56,444 | 22 April 2021 |
| 100 | Habra | AITC | Jyotipriya Mallick | 90533 | 44.34 | BJP | Biswajit Sinha | 86692 | 42.46 | 3841 | 22 April 2021 |
| 101 | Ashoknagar | AITC | Narayan Goswami | 93,587 | 43.18 | BJP | Tanuja Chakraborty | 70,055 | 32.32 | 23,532 | 22 April 2021 |
| 102 | Amdanga | AITC | Rafiqur Rahaman | 88,935 | 42.00 | BJP | Joydev Manna | 63,455 | 29.97 | 25,480 | 22 April 2021 |
| 103 | Bijpur | AITC | Subodh Adhikary | 66,625 | 47.90 | BJP | Subhranshu Roy | 53,278 | 38.30 | 13,347 | 22 April 2021 |
| 104 | Naihati | AITC | Partha Bhowmick | 77753 | 49.69 | BJP | Phalguni Patra | 58898 | 37.64 | 18855 | 22 April 2021 |
| 105 | Bhatpara | BJP | Pawan Kumar Singh | 57244 | 53.40 | AITC | Jitendra Shaw | 43557 | 40.63 | 13687 | 22 April 2021 |
| 106 | Jagatdal | AITC | Somenath Shyam Ichini | 87030 | 48.01 | BJP | Arindam Bhattacharya | 68666 | 37.88 | 18364 | 22 April 2021 |
| 107 | Noapara | AITC | Manju Basu | 94203 | 48.9 | BJP | Sunil Singh | 67493 | 35.04 | 26710 | 22 April 2021 |
| 108 | Barrackpore | AITC | Raj Chakraborty | 68887 | 46.47 | BJP | Chandramani Shukla | 59665 | 40.25 | 9222 | 22 April 2021 |
| 109 | Khardaha | AITC | Kajal Sinha | 89807 | 49.04 | BJP | Silbhadra Datta | 61667 | 33.67 | 28140 | 22 April 2021 |
| 110 | Dum Dum Uttar | AITC | Chandrima Bhattacharya | 95465 | 44.79 | BJP | Dr. Archana Majumdar | 66966 | 31.42 | 28499 | 22 April 2021 |
| 111 | Panihati | AITC | Nirmal Ghosh | 86,495 | 49.61 | BJP | Sanmoy Bandyopadhyay | 61,318 | 35.17 | 25,177 | 17 April 2021 |
| 112 | Kamarhati | AITC | Madan Mitra | 73,845 | 51.17 | BJP | Anindya Banerjee | 38,437 | 26.64 | 35,408 | 17 April 2021 |
| 113 | Baranagar | AITC | Tapas Roy | 85,615 | 53.42 | BJP | Parno Mitra | 50,468 | 31.49 | 35,147 | 17 April 2021 |
| 114 | Dum Dum | AITC | Bratya Basu | 87,999 | 47.48 | BJP | Bimalshankar Nanda | 61,368 | 33.06 | 26,731 | 17 April 2021 |
| 115 | Rajarhat New Town | AITC | Tapash Chatterjee | 1,27,374 | 54.22 | BJP | Bhaskar Roy | 70,942 | 30.2 | 56,432 | 17 April 2021 |
| 116 | Bidhannagar | AITC | Sujit Bose | 75,912 | 46.85 | BJP | Sabyasachi Dutta | 67,915 | 41.91 | 7,997 | 17 April 2021 |
| 117 | Rajarhat Gopalpur | AITC | Aditi Munshi | 87,650 | 49.04 | BJP | Samik Bhattacharya | 62,354 | 34.89 | 25,296 | 17 April 2021 |
| 118 | Madhyamgram | AITC | Rathin Ghosh | 1,12,741 | 48.93 | BJP | Rajasree Rajbanshi | 64,615 | 28.04 | 48,126 | 17 April 2021 |
| 119 | Barasat | AITC | Chiranjeet Chakraborty | 1,04,431 | 46.27 | BJP | Sankar Chatterjee | 80,648 | 35.73 | 23,783 | 17 April 2021 |
| 120 | Deganga | AITC | Rahima Mondal | 1,00,105 | 46.7 | ISF | Karim Ali | 67,568 | 31.52 | 32,537 | 17 April 2021 |
| 121 | Haroa | AITC | Islam Sk Nurul (Haji) | 1,30,398 | 57.34 | ISF | Kutubuddin Fathe | 49,420 | 21.73 | 80,978 | 17 April 2021 |
| 122 | Minakhan (SC) | AITC | Usha Rani Mondal | 1,09,818 | 51.72 | BJP | Jayanta Mondal | 53,988 | 25.42 | 55,830 | 17 April 2021 |
| 123 | Sandeshkhali (ST) | AITC | Sukumar Mahata | 1,12,450 | 54.64 | BJP | Dr. Bhaskar Sardar | 72,765 | 35.36 | 39,685 | 17 April 2021 |
| 124 | Basirhat Dakshin | AITC | Dr. Saptarshi Banerjee | 1,15,873 | 49.15 | BJP | Tarak Nath Ghosh | 91,405 | 38.77 | 24,468 | 17 April 2021 |
| 125 | Basirhat Uttar | AITC | Rafikul Islam Mondal | 1,37,216 | 57.55 | ISF | Md. Baijid Amin | 47,865 | 20.08 | 89,351 | 17 April 2021 |
| 126 | Hingalganj (SC) | AITC | Debes Mandal | 1,04,706 | 53.78 | BJP | Nemai Das | 79,790 | 40.98 | 24,916 | 17 April 2021 |
South 24 Parganas district
| 127 | Gosaba (SC) | AITC | Jayanta Naskar | 1,05,723 | 53.99 | BJP | Barun Pramanik (Chitta) | 82,014 | 41.88 | 23,709 | 1 April 2021 |
| 128 | Basanti (SC) | AITC | Shyamal Mondal | 1,11,453 | 52.1 | BJP | Ramesh Majhi | 60,811 | 28.43 | 50,642 | 6 April 2021 |
| 129 | Kultali (SC) | AITC | Ganesh Chandra Mondal | 1,17,238 | 51.57 | BJP | Mintu Halder | 70,061 | 30.82 | 47,177 | 6 April 2021 |
| 130 | Patharpratima | AITC | Samir Kumar Jana | 1,20,181 | 51.85 | BJP | Asit Kumar Haldar | 98,047 | 42.3 | 22,134 | 1 April 2021 |
| 131 | Kakdwip | AITC | Manturam Pakhira | 1,14,493 | 52.14 | BJP | Dipankar Jana | 89,191 | 40.62 | 25,302 | 1 April 2021 |
| 132 | Sagar | AITC | Bankim Chandra Hazra | 1,29,000 | 53.96 | BJP | Kamila Bikash | 99,154 | 41.48 | 29846 | 1 April 2021 |
| 133 | Kulpi | AITC | Jogaranjan Halder | 96,577 | 50.01 | BJP | Pranab Kumar Mallik | 62,759 | 32.5 | 33,818 | 6 April 2021 |
| 134 | Raidighi | AITC | Aloke Jaldata | 1,15,707 | 48.47 | BJP | Santanu Bapuli | 80,139 | 33.57 | 35568 | 6 April 2021 |
| 135 | Mandirbazar (SC) | AITC | Joydeb Halder | 95,834 | 48.04 | BJP | Dilip Kumar Jatua | 72,342 | 36.26 | 23,492 | 6 April 2021 |
| 136 | Jaynagar (SC) | AITC | Biswanath Das | 1,04,952 | 51.85 | BJP | Rabin Sardar | 66,269 | 32.74 | 38,683 | 6 April 2021 |
| 137 | Baruipur Purba (SC) | AITC | Bivas Sardar (Vobo) | 1,23,243 | 54.75 | BJP | Chandan Mondal | 73,602 | 32.7 | 49,641 | 6 April 2021 |
| 138 | Canning Paschim (SC) | AITC | Paresh Ram Das | 1,11,059 | 50.86 | BJP | Arnab Roy | 75,816 | 34.72 | 35,243 | 6 April 2021 |
| 139 | Canning Purba | AITC | Saokat Molla | 1,22,301 | 52.54 | ISF | Gazi Shahabuddin Siraji | 69,294 | 29.77 | 53,007 | 6 April 2021 |
| 140 | Baruipur Paschim | AITC | Biman Banerjee | 1,21,006 | 57.27 | BJP | Debopam Chattopadhyaya (Babu) | 59,096 | 27.97 | 61,910 | 6 April 2021 |
| 141 | Magrahat Purba (SC) | AITC | Namita Saha | 1,10,945 | 53.82 | BJP | Chandan Kumar Naskar | 56,866 | 27.58 | 54,079 | 6 April 2021 |
| 142 | Magrahat Paschim | AITC | Gias Uddin Molla | 97,006 | 49.93 | BJP | Dhurjati Saha (Manas) | 50,065 | 25.77 | 46,941 | 6 April 2021 |
| 143 | Diamond Harbour | AITC | Pannalal Halder | 98,478 | 43.69 | BJP | Dipak Kumar Halder | 81,482 | 36.15 | 16996 | 6 April 2021 |
| 144 | Falta | AITC | Sankar Kumar Naskar | 1,17,179 | 56.35 | BJP | Bidhan Parui | 76,405 | 36.75 | 40,774 | 6 April 2021 |
| 145 | Satgachia | AITC | Mohan Chandra Naskar | 1,18,635 | 50.37 | BJP | Chandan Pal | 95,317 | 40.47 | 23,318 | 6 April 2021 |
| 146 | Bishnupur (South 24 Parganas) (SC) | AITC | Dilip Mondal | 1,36,509 | 57.46 | BJP | Agniswar Naskar | 77,677 | 32.7 | 58,832 | 6 April 2021 |
| 147 | Sonarpur Dakshin | AITC | Arundhuti Maitra (Lovely) | 1,09,222 | 46.92 | BJP | Anjana Basu | 83,041 | 35.67 | 26,181 | 10 April 2021 |
| 148 | Bhangar | ISF | Nawsad Siddique | 1,09,237 | 45.1 | AITC | Karim Rezaul | 83,086 | 34.31 | 26,151 | 10 April 2021 |
| 149 | Kasba | AITC | Javed Ahmed Khan | 1,21,372 | 54.39 | BJP | Dr. Indranil Khan | 57,750 | 25.88 | 63,622 | 10 April 2021 |
| 150 | Jadavpur | AITC | Debabrata Majumdar (Malay) | 98,100 | 45.54 | CPI(M) | Dr. Sujan Chakraborty | 59,231 | 27.5 | 38,869 | 10 April 2021 |
| 151 | Sonarpur Uttar | AITC | Firdousi Begum | 1,19,957 | 49.88 | BJP | Ranjan Baidya | 83,867 | 34.87 | 36,090 | 10 April 2021 |
| 152 | Tollygunge | AITC | Aroop Biswas | 1,01,440 | 51.4 | BJP | Babul Supriyo | 51,360 | 26.02 | 50,080 | 10 April 2021 |
| 153 | Behala Purba | AITC | Ratna Chatterjee | 1,10,968 | 50.01 | BJP | Payel Sarkar | 73,540 | 33.15 | 37,428 | 10 April 2021 |
| 154 | Behala Paschim | AITC | Partha Chatterjee | 1,14,778 | 49.51 | BJP | Srabanti Chatterjee | 63,894 | 27.56 | 50,884 | 10 April 2021 |
| 155 | Maheshtala | AITC | Dulal Chandra Das | 1,24,008 | 56.38 | BJP | Umesh Das | 66,059 | 30.03 | 57,949 | 10 April 2021 |
| 156 | Budge Budge | AITC | Ashok Kumar Deb | 1,22,357 | 56.41 | BJP | Dr. Tarun Kumar Adak | 77,643 | 35.8 | 44,714 | 10 April 2021 |
| 157 | Metiaburuz | AITC | Abdul Khaleque Molla | 1,51,066 | 76.85 | BJP | Ramjit Prasad | 31,462 | 16 | 1,19,604 | 10 April 2021 |
Kolkata district
| 158 | Kolkata Port | AITC | Firhad Hakim | 1,05,543 | 69.23 | BJP | Awadh Kishore Gupta | 36,989 | 24.26 | 68,554 | 26 April 2021 |
| 159 | Bhabanipur | AITC | Sobhandeb Chattopadhyay | 73,505 | 57.71 | BJP | Rudranil Ghosh | 44,786 | 35.16 | 28,719 | 26 April 2021 |
| 160 | Rashbehari | AITC | Debasish Kumar | 65,704 | 52.79 | BJP | Lt. Gen. (Dr.) Subrata Saha | 44,290 | 35.59 | 21,414 | 26 April 2021 |
| 161 | Ballygunge | AITC | Subrata Mukherjee | 1,06,585 | 70.6 | BJP | Lokenath Chatterjee | 31,226 | 20.68 | 75,359 | 26 April 2021 |
| 162 | Chowrangee | AITC | Nayna Bandyopadhyay | 70,101 | 62.87 | BJP | Devdutta Maji | 24,757 | 22.2 | 45,344 | 29 April 2021 |
| 163 | Entally | AITC | Swarna Kamal Saha | 1,01,709 | 64.83 | BJP | Priyanka Tibrewal | 43,452 | 27.7 | 58,257 | 29 April 2021 |
| 164 | Beleghata | AITC | Paresh Paul | 1,03,182 | 65.1 | BJP | Kashinath Biswas | 36,042 | 22.74 | 67,140 | 29 April 2021 |
| 165 | Jorasanko | AITC | Vivek Gupta | 52,123 | 52.67 | BJP | Meena Devi Purohit | 39,380 | 39.8 | 12,743 | 29 April 2021 |
| 166 | Shyampukur | AITC | Dr. Shashi Panja | 55,785 | 54.18 | BJP | Sandipan Biswas | 33,265 | 32.31 | 22,520 | 29 April 2021 |
| 167 | Maniktala | AITC | Sadhan Pande | 67,577 | 50.82 | BJP | Kalyan Chaubey | 47,339 | 35.6 | 20,238 | 29 April 2021 |
| 168 | Kashipur-Belgachia | AITC | Atin Ghosh | 76,182 | 56.48 | BJP | Sibaji Sinha Roy | 40,792 | 30.24 | 35,390 | 29 April 2021 |
Howrah district
| 169 | Bally | AITC | Rana Chatterjee | 53,347 | 42.38 | BJP | Baishali Dalmiya | 47,110 | 37.43 | 6,237 | 10 April 2021 |
| 170 | Howrah Uttar | AITC | Gautam Chowdhuri | 71,575 | 47.81 | BJP | Umesh Rai | 66,053 | 44.12 | 5,522 | 10 April 2021 |
| 171 | Howrah Madhya | AITC | Arup Roy | 1,11,554 | 57.16 | BJP | Sanjay Singh | 65,007 | 33.31 | 46,547 | 10 April 2021 |
| 172 | Shibpur | AITC | Manoj Tiwary | 92,372 | 50.69 | BJP | Rathin Chakrabarty | 59,769 | 32.8 | 32,603 | 10 April 2021 |
| 173 | Howrah Dakshin | AITC | Nandita Chowdhury | 1,16,839 | 53.85 | BJP | Rantidev Sengupta | 66,270 | 30.55 | 50,569 | 10 April 2021 |
| 174 | Sankrail (SC) | AITC | Priya Paul | 1,11,888 | 50.37 | BJP | Probhakar Pandit | 71,461 | 32.17 | 40,427 | 10 April 2021 |
| 175 | Panchla | AITC | Gulsan Mullick | 1,04,572 | 48.19 | BJP | Mohit Lal Ghanti | 71,821 | 33.1 | 32,751 | 10 April 2021 |
| 176 | Uluberia Purba | AITC | Bidesh Ranjan Bose | 86,526 | 44.83 | BJP | Pratyush Mandal | 69,400 | 35.95 | 17,126 | 10 April 2021 |
| 177 | Uluberia Uttar (SC) | AITC | Dr. Nirmal Maji | 91,501 | 49.25 | BJP | Chiran Bera | 70,498 | 37.95 | 21,003 | 6 April 2021 |
| 178 | Uluberia Dakshin | AITC | Pulak Roy | 1,01,880 | 50.37 | BJP | Papia Dey (Adhikary) | 73,442 | 36.31 | 28,438 | 6 April 2021 |
| 179 | Shyampur | AITC | Kalipada Mandal | 1,14,804 | 51.74 | BJP | Tanusree Chakraborty | 83,293 | 37.54 | 31,511 | 6 April 2021 |
| 180 | Bagnan | AITC | Arunava Sen (Raja) | 1,06,042 | 53.04 | BJP | Anupam Mallik | 75,922 | 37.97 | 30,120 | 6 April 2021 |
| 181 | Amta | AITC | Sukanta Kumar Paul | 1,02,445 | 49.06 | BJP | Debtanu Bhattacharya | 76,240 | 36.51 | 26,205 | 6 April 2021 |
| 182 | Udaynarayanpur | AITC | Samir Kumar Panja | 1,01,510 | 51.21 | BJP | Sumit Ranjan Karar | 87,512 | 44.15 | 13,998 | 6 April 2021 |
| 183 | Jagatballavpur | AITC | Sitanath Ghosh | 1,16,562 | 49.45 | BJP | Anupam Ghosh | 87,366 | 37.06 | 29196 | 6 April 2021 |
| 184 | Domjur | AITC | Kalyan Ghosh | 1,30,499 | 52 | BJP | Rajib Banerjee | 87,879 | 35.01 | 42620 | 10 April 2021 |
Hooghly district
| 185 | Uttarpara | AITC | Kanchan Mullick | 93,878 | 46.96 | BJP | Prabir Kumar Ghosal | 57,889 | 28.96 | 35,989 | 10 April 2021 |
| 186 | Sreerampur | AITC | Dr. Sudipto Roy | 93,021 | 49.46 | BJP | Kabir Shankar Bose | 69,588 | 37 | 23,433 | 10 April 2021 |
| 187 | Champdani | AITC | Arindam Guin (Bubai) | 1,00,972 | 50.2 | BJP | Dilip Singh | 70,894 | 35.25 | 30,078 | 10 April 2021 |
| 188 | Singur | AITC | Becharam Manna | 1,01,077 | 48.15 | BJP | Rabindranath Bhattacharya | 75,154 | 35.8 | 25,923 | 10 April 2021 |
| 189 | Chandannagar | AITC | Indranil Sen | 86,778 | 47.63 | BJP | Deepanjan Kumar Guha | 55,749 | 30.6 | 31,029 | 10 April 2021 |
| 190 | Chunchura | AITC | Asit Mazumder (Tapan) | 1,17,104 | 45.97 | BJP | Locket Chatterjee | 98,687 | 38.74 | 18,417 | 10 April 2021 |
| 191 | Balagarh (SC) | AITC | Manoranjan Byapari | 1,00,364 | 45.63 | BJP | Subhas Chandra Haldar | 94,580 | 43 | 5,784 | 10 April 2021 |
| 192 | Pandua | AITC | Dr. Ratna De Nag | 1,02,874 | 45.99 | BJP | Partha Sharma | 71,016 | 31.75 | 31,858 | 10 April 2021 |
| 193 | Saptagram | AITC | Tapan Dasgupta | 93,328 | 48.56 | BJP | Debabrata Biswas | 83,556 | 43.48 | 9,772 | 10 April 2021 |
| 194 | Chanditala | AITC | Swati Khandoker | 1,03,118 | 49.79 | BJP | Yash Dasgupta | 61,771 | 29.83 | 41,347 | 10 April 2021 |
| 195 | Jangipara | AITC | Snehasis Chakraborty | 1,01,885 | 48.42 | BJP | Debjit Sarkar | 83,959 | 39.9 | 17,926 | 6 April 2021 |
| 196 | Haripal | AITC | Dr. Karabi Manna | 1,10,215 | 49.92 | BJP | Samiran Mitra | 87,143 | 39.47 | 23,072 | 6 April 2021 |
| 197 | Dhanekhali (SC) | AITC | Asima Patra | 1,24,776 | 53.36 | BJP | Tusar Kumar Majumdar | 94,617 | 40.46 | 30,159 | 6 April 2021 |
| 198 | Tarakeswar | AITC | Ramendu Sinharay | 96,698 | 46.96 | BJP | Dr. Swapan Dasgupta | 89,214 | 43.33 | 7484 | 6 April 2021 |
| 199 | Pursurah | BJP | Biman Ghosh | 1,19,334 | 53.5 | AITC | Dilip Yadav | 91,156 | 40.86 | 28,178 | 6 April 2021 |
| 200 | Arambagh (SC) | BJP | Madhusudan Bag | 1,03,108 | 46.88 | AITC | Sujata Mondal | 95,936 | 43.62 | 7,172 | 6 April 2021 |
| 201 | Goghat (SC) | BJP | Biswanath Karak | 1,02,227 | 46.56 | AITC | Manas Majumdar | 98,080 | 44.67 | 4,147 | 6 April 2021 |
| 202 | Khanakul | BJP | Susanta Ghosh | 1,07,403 | 49.27 | AITC | Munsi Nazbul Karim | 94,519 | 43.36 | 12,884 | 6 April 2021 |
Purba Medinipur district
| 203 | Tamluk | AITC | Saumen Kumar Mahapatra | 1,08,243 | 45.86 | BJP | Hare Krishna Bera | 1,07,450 | 45.52 | 793 | 1 April 2021 |
| 204 | Panskura Purba | AITC | Biplab Roy Chowdhury | 91,213 | 45.97 | BJP | Debabrata Pattanayek | 81,553 | 41.11 | 9,660 | 1 April 2021 |
| 205 | Panskura Paschim | AITC | Phiroja Bibi | 1,11,705 | 47.71 | BJP | Sintu Senapati | 1,02,816 | 43.91 | 8,889 | 1 April 2021 |
| 206 | Moyna | BJP | Ashoke Dinda | 1,08,109 | 48.17 | AITC | Sangram Kumar Dolai | 1,06,849 | 47.61 | 1,260 | 1 April 2021 |
| 207 | Nandakumar | AITC | Sukumar De | 1,08,181 | 47.6 | BJP | Nilanjan Adhikary | 1,02,775 | 45.22 | 5,406 | 1 April 2021 |
| 208 | Mahisadal | AITC | Tilak Kumar Chakraborty | 1,01,986 | 46.49 | BJP | Biswanath Banerjee | 99,600 | 45.41 | 2,386 | 1 April 2021 |
| 209 | Haldia (SC) | BJP | Tapasi Mondal | 1,04,126 | 47.15 | AITC | Swapan Naskar | 89,118 | 40.36 | 15,008 | 1 April 2021 |
| 210 | Nandigram | BJP | Suvendu Adhikari | 1,10,764 | 48.49 | AITC | Mamata Banerjee | 1,08,808 | 47.64 | 1,956 | 1 April 2021 |
| 211 | Chandipur | AITC | Soham Chakraborty | 1,09,770 | 49.82 | BJP | Pulak Kanti Guria | 96,298 | 43.71 | 13,472 | 1 April 2021 |
| 212 | Patashpur | AITC | Uttam Barik | 1,05,299 | 50.42 | BJP | Ambujaksha Mahanti | 95,305 | 45.64 | 9,994 | 27 March 2021 |
| 213 | Kanthi Uttar | BJP | Sumita Sinha | 1,13,524 | 49.7 | AITC | Tarun Kumar Jana | 1,04,194 | 45.62 | 9,330 | 27 March 2021 |
| 214 | Bhagabanpur | BJP | Rabindranath Maity | 1,21,480 | 54.46 | AITC | Ardhendu Maity | 93,931 | 42.19 | 27,549 | 27 March 2021 |
| 215 | Khejuri (SC) | BJP | Santanu Pramanik | 1,10,407 | 51.93 | AITC | Partha Pratim Das | 92,442 | 43.48 | 17,965 | 27 March 2021 |
| 216 | Kanthi Dakshin | BJP | Arup Kumar Das | 98,477 | 50.58 | AITC | Jyotirmoy Kar | 88,184 | 45.3 | 10,293 | 27 March 2021 |
| 217 | Ramnagar | AITC | Akhil Giri | 1,12,622 | 50.72 | BJP | Swadesh Ranjan Nayak | 1,00,105 | 45.08 | 12,517 | 27 March 2021 |
| 218 | Egra | AITC | Tarun Kumar Maity | 1,25,763 | 52.22 | BJP | Arup Dash | 1,07,272 | 44.55 | 18,491 | 27 March 2021 |
Paschim Medinipur district
| 219 | Dantan | AITC | Bikram Chandra Pradhan | 94,609 | 48.18 | BJP | Saktipada Nayak | 93,834 | 47.79 | 775 | 27 March 2021 |
Jhargram district
| 220 | Nayagram (ST) | AITC | Dulal Murmu | 99,825 | 52.52 | BJP | Bakul Murmu | 77,089 | 40.55 | 22,736 | 27 March 2021 |
| 221 | Gopiballavpur | AITC | Dr. Khagendra Nath Mahata | 1,02,710 | 52.34 | BJP | Sanjit Mahata | 79,106 | 40.31 | 23,604 | 27 March 2021 |
| 222 | Jhargram | AITC | Birbaha Hansda | 1,08,044 | 54.34 | BJP | Sukhamay Satpathy (Jahar) | 70,048 | 35.23 | 37,996 | 27 March 2021 |
Paschim Medinipur district
| 223 | Keshiary (ST) | AITC | Paresh Murmu | 1,06,366 | 50.01 | BJP | Sonali Murmu | 91,036 | 42.8 | 15,330 | 27 March 2021 |
| 224 | Kharagpur Sadar | BJP | Hiran Chatterjee | 79,607 | 46.45 | AITC | Pradip Sarkar | 75,836 | 44.25 | 3,771 | 1 April 2021 |
| 225 | Narayangarh | AITC | Suryakanta Atta | 1,00,894 | 46.33 | BJP | Ramprasad Giri | 98,478 | 45.23 | 2,416 | 1 April 2021 |
| 226 | Sabang | AITC | Manas Bhunia | 1,12,098 | 47.46 | BJP | Amulya Maity | 1,02,234 | 43.28 | 9,864 | 1 April 2021 |
| 227 | Pingla | AITC | Ajit Maity | 1,12,435 | 49.17 | BJP | Antara Bhattacharya | 1,05,779 | 46.26 | 6,656 | 1 April 2021 |
| 228 | Kharagpur | AITC | Dinen Ray | 1,09,727 | 54.85 | BJP | Tapan Bhuiya | 73,497 | 36.74 | 36,230 | 27 March 2021 |
| 229 | Debra | AITC | Humayun Kabir | 95,850 | 46.79 | BJP | Bharati Ghosh | 84,624 | 41.31 | 11,226 | 1 April 2021 |
| 230 | Daspur | AITC | Mamata Bhunia | 1,14,753 | 51.58 | BJP | Prashanth Bera | 87,911 | 39.52 | 26,842 | 1 April 2021 |
| 231 | Ghatal | BJP | Shital Kapat | 1,05,812 | 46.95 | AITC | Shankar Dolai | 1,04,846 | 46.52 | 966 | 1 April 2021 |
| 232 | Chandrakona (SC) | AITC | Arup Dhara | 1,21,846 | 48.87 | BJP | Shibram Das | 1,10,565 | 44.35 | 11,281 | 1 April 2021 |
| 233 | Garbeta | AITC | Uttara Singha | 94,928 | 45.71 | BJP | Madan Ruidas | 84,356 | 40.62 | 10,572 | 27 March 2021 |
| 234 | Salboni | AITC | Srikanta Mahata | 1,26,020 | 50.57 | BJP | Rajib Kundu | 93,376 | 37.47 | 32,644 | 27 March 2021 |
| 235 | Keshpur | AITC | Siuli Saha | 1,16,992 | 50.81 | BJP | Pritish Ranjan | 96,272 | 41.82 | 20,720 | 1 April 2021 |
| 236 | Medinipur | AITC | June Malia | 1,21,175 | 50.72 | BJP | Shamit Dash | 96,778 | 40.51 | 24,397 | 27 March 2021 |
Jhargram district
| 237 | Binpur (ST) | AITC | Debnath Hansda | 99,786 | 53.18 | BJP | Palan Saren | 60,213 | 32.09 | 39,573 | 27 March 2021 |
Purulia district
| 238 | Bandwan (ST) | AITC | Rajib Lochan Saren | 1,12,183 | 47.07 | BJP | Parsi Murmu | 93,298 | 39.14 | 18,885 | 27 March 2021 |
| 239 | Balarampur | BJP | Baneswar Mahato | 88,803 | 45.17 | AITC | Shantiram Mahato | 88,530 | 45.03 | 273 | 27 March 2021 |
| 240 | Baghmundi | AITC | Sushanta Mahato | 75,245 | 36.76 | AJSU | Ashutosh Mahato | 61,510 | 30.05 | 13,735 | 27 March 2021 |
| 241 | Joypur | BJP | Narahari Mahato | 73,713 | 36.66 | INC | Phanibhushan Kumar | 61,611 | 30.64 | 12,102 | 27 March 2021 |
| 242 | Purulia | BJP | Sudip Kumar Mukherjee | 88,899 | 43.33 | AITC | Sujoy Banerjee | 82,134 | 40.12 | 6,585 | 27 March 2021 |
| 243 | Manbazar (ST) | AITC | Sandhyarani Tudu | 1,02,169 | 48.39 | BJP | Gouri Singh Sardar | 86,679 | 41.05 | 15,490 | 27 March 2021 |
| 244 | Kashipur | BJP | Kamalakanta Hansda | 92,061 | 47.68 | AITC | Swapan Kumar Beltharia | 84,829 | 43.93 | 7,240 | 27 March 2021 |
| 245 | Para (SC) | BJP | Nadiar Chand Bouri | 86,930 | 45.01 | AITC | Umapada Bauri | 82,986 | 42.96 | 3944 | 27 March 2021 |
| 246 | Raghunathpur (SC) | BJP | Vivekananda Bauri | 94,994 | 44.59 | AITC | Bouri Hazari | 89,671 | 42.04 | 5,323 | 27 March 2021 |
Bankura district
| 247 | Saltora (SC) | BJP | Chandana Bauri | 91,648 | 45.28 | AITC | Santosh Kumar Mondal | 87,503 | 43.23 | 4,145 | 27 March 2021 |
| 248 | Chhatna | BJP | Satyanarayan Mukhopadhyay | 90,233 | 45.84 | AITC | Subasish Batabyal | 83,069 | 42.20 | 7,164 | 27 March 2021 |
| 249 | Ranibandh (ST) | AITC | Jyotsna Mandi | 90,928 | 43.06 | BJP | Kshudiram Tudu | 86,989 | 41.19 | 3,939 | 27 March 2021 |
| 250 | Raipur (ST) | AITC | Mrityunjoy Murmu | 1,01,043 | 51.96 | BJP | Sudhanshu Hansda | 81,645 | 41.98 | 19,398 | 27 March 2021 |
| 251 | Taldangra | AITC | Arup Chakraborty | 92,026 | 45.29 | BJP | Shyamal Kumar Sarkar | 79,649 | 39.20 | 12,377 | 1 April 2021 |
| 252 | Bankura | BJP | Niladri Sekhar Dana | 95,466 | 43.79 | AITC | Sayantika Banerjee | 93,998 | 43.12 | 1,468 | 1 April 2021 |
| 253 | Barjora | AITC | Alok Mukherjee | 93,290 | 42.51 | BJP | Supriti Chatterjee | 90,021 | 41.02 | 3,269 | 1 April 2021 |
| 254 | Onda | BJP | Amarnath Shakha | 10,4940 | 46.48 | AITC | Arup Kumar Khan | 93,389 | 41.37 | 11,551 | 1 April 2021 |
| 255 | Bishnupur (Bankura) | BJP | Tanmay Ghosh | 88,743 | 46.79 | AITC | Archita Bid | 77,610 | 40.92 | 11,133 | 1 April 2021 |
| 256 | Katulpur (SC) | BJP | Harakali Protiher | 10,6022 | 47.31 | AITC | Sangeeta Malik | 94,237 | 42.05 | 11,785 | 1 April 2021 |
| 257 | Indas (SC) | BJP | Nirmal Kumar Dhara | 1,04,936 | 48.04 | AITC | Runu Mete | 97,716 | 44.73 | 7,220 | 1 April 2021 |
| 258 | Sonamukhi (SC) | BJP | Dibakar Gharami | 98,161 | 47.25 | AITC | Dr Shyamal Santra | 87,273 | 42.01 | 10,888 | 1 April 2021 |
Purba Bardhaman district
| 259 | Khandaghosh (SC) | AITC | Nabin Chandra Bag | 1,04,264 | 47.85 | BJP | Bijan Mandal | 83,378 | 38.26 | 20,886 | 17 April 2021 |
| 260 | Bardhaman Dakshin | AITC | Khokan Das | 91,015 | 44.32 | BJP | Sandip Nandi | 82,910 | 40.38 | 8,105 | 17 April 2021 |
| 261 | Raina (SC) | AITC | Shampa Dhara | 1,08,752 | 47.46 | BJP | Manik Roy | 90,547 | 39.51 | 18,205 | 17 April 2021 |
| 262 | Jamalpur (SC) | AITC | Alok Kumar Majhi | 96,999 | 46.93 | BJP | Balaram Bapari | 79,028 | 38.24 | 17,971 | 17 April 2021 |
| 263 | Manteswar | AITC | Chowdhury Siddiqullah | 1,05,460 | 50.45 | BJP | Saikat Panja | 73,655 | 35.24 | 31,805 | 17 April 2021 |
| 264 | Kalna (SC) | AITC | Deboprasad Bag (Poltu) | 96,073 | 45.98 | BJP | Biswajit Kundu | 88,595 | 42.4 | 7,478 | 17 April 2021 |
| 265 | Memari | AITC | Madhusudan Bhattacharya | 1,04,851 | 47.92 | BJP | Bhismadeb Bhattacharya | 81,773 | 37.37 | 23,078 | 17 April 2021 |
| 266 | Bardhaman Uttar (SC) | AITC | Nisith Kumar Malik | 1,11,211 | 45.97 | BJP | Radha Kanta Roy | 93,943 | 38.83 | 17,268 | 17 April 2021 |
| 267 | Bhatar | AITC | Adhikari Mangobinda | 1,08,028 | 50.44 | BJP | Mahendranath Kowar | 76,287 | 35.62 | 31,741 | 22 April 2021 |
| 268 | Purbasthali Dakshin | AITC | Swapan Debnath | 1,05,698 | 49.08 | BJP | Rajib Kumar Bhowmick | 88,288 | 41 | 17,410 | 22 April 2021 |
| 269 | Purbasthali Uttar | AITC | Tapan Chatterjee | 92,421 | 43.52 | BJP | Gobardhan Das | 85,715 | 40.37 | 6,706 | 22 April 2021 |
| 270 | Katwa | AITC | Rabindranath Chatterjee | 1,07,894 | 48.07 | BJP | Shyama Majumdar | 98,739 | 43.99 | 9,155 | 22 April 2021 |
| 271 | Ketugram | AITC | Sekh Sahonawez | 1,00,226 | 46.55 | BJP | Anadi Ghosh (Mathura) | 87,543 | 40.66 | 12,683 | 22 April 2021 |
| 272 | Mangalkot | AITC | Apurba Chowdhury (Achal) | 1,07,596 | 49.51 | BJP | Rana Protap Goswami | 85,259 | 39.23 | 22,337 | 22 April 2021 |
| 273 | Ausgram (SC) | AITC | Abhedananda Thander | 1,00,392 | 46.25 | BJP | Kalita Maji | 88,577 | 40.8 | 11,815 | 22 April 2021 |
| 274 | Galsi (SC) | AITC | Nepal Ghorui | 1,09,504 | 49.21 | BJP | Bikash Biswas | 90,242 | 40.55 | 19,262 | 22 April 2021 |
Paschim Bardhaman district
| 275 | Pandaveswar | AITC | Narendranath Chakraborty | 73922 | 44.99 | BJP | Jitendra Tiwari | 70119 | 42.68 | 3803 | 26 April 2021 |
| 276 | Durgapur Purba | AITC | Pradip Mazumdar | 79303 | 41.16 | BJP | Colonel Diptansu Chaudhury | 75557 | 39.21 | 3746 | 26 April 2021 |
| 277 | Durgapur Paschim | BJP | Lakshman Chandra Ghorui | 91186 | 46.31 | AITC | Biswanath Parial | 76522 | 38.86 | 14664 | 26 April 2021 |
| 278 | Raniganj | AITC | Tapas Banerjee | 78164 | 42.90 | BJP | Dr. Bijan Mukherjee | 74608 | 40.95 | 3556 | 26 April 2021 |
| 279 | Jamuria | AITC | Hareram Singh | 71002 | 42.59 | BJP | Tapas Kumar Roy | 62951 | 37.76 | 8051 | 26 April 2021 |
| 280 | Asansol Dakshin | BJP | Agnimitra Paul | 87881 | 45.13 | AITC | Sayani Ghosh | 83394 | 42.82 | 4487 | 26 April 2021 |
| 281 | Asansol Uttar | AITC | Moloy Ghatak | 100931 | 52.32 | BJP | Krishnendu Mukherjee | 79821 | 41.38 | 21110 | 26 April 2021 |
| 282 | Kulti | BJP | Ajay Kumar Poddar | 81112 | 46.41 | AITC | Ujjal Chatterjee | 80433 | 46.02 | 679 | 26 April 2021 |
| 283 | Barabani | AITC | Bidhan Upadhyay | 88430 | 52.26 | BJP | Arijit Roy | 64973 | 38.40 | 23457 | 26 April 2021 |
Birbhum district
| 284 | Dubrajpur (SC) | BJP | Anup Kumar Saha | 98,083 | 47.94 | AITC | Debabrata Saha | 94,220 | 46.05 | 3,863 | 29 April 2021 |
| 285 | Suri | AITC | Bikash Roychoudhury | 1,05,871 | 48.43 | BJP | Jagannath Chattopadhyay | 98,551 | 45.08 | 7,320 | 29 April 2021 |
| 286 | Bolpur | AITC | Sinha Chandranath | 1,16,443 | 50.57 | BJP | Anirban Ganguly | 94,163 | 40.89 | 22,280 | 29 April 2021 |
| 287 | Nanoor (SC) | AITC | Bidhan Chandra Majhi | 1,12,116 | 47.64 | BJP | Tarakeswar Saha | 1,05,446 | 44.81 | 6670 | 29 April 2021 |
| 288 | Labpur | AITC | Abhijit Sinha (Rana) | 1,08,423 | 51.14 | BJP | Biswajit Mondal | 90,448 | 42.66 | 17,975 | 29 April 2021 |
| 289 | Sainthia (SC) | AITC | Nilabati Saha | 1,10,572 | 49.84 | BJP | Piya Saha | 95,329 | 42.97 | 15,243 | 29 April 2021 |
| 290 | Mayureswar | AITC | Abhijit Roy | 1,00,425 | 50.36 | BJP | Shyamapada Mondal | 88,350 | 44.3 | 12,075 | 29 April 2021 |
| 291 | Rampurhat | AITC | Asish Banerjee | 1,03,276 | 47.52 | BJP | Subhasis Choudhury (Khokan) | 94,804 | 43.62 | 8,472 | 29 April 2021 |
| 292 | Hansan | AITC | Dr. Asok Kumar Chattopadhyay | 1,08,289 | 51.42 | BJP | Nikhil Banerjee | 57,676 | 27.39 | 50,613 | 29 April 2021 |
| 293 | Nalhati | AITC | Rajendra Prasad Singh (Raju Singh) | 1,17,438 | 56.54 | BJP | Tapas Kumar Yadav (Ananda Yadav) | 60,533 | 29.15 | 56,905 | 29 April 2021 |
| 294 | Murarai | AITC | Dr Mosarraf Hossain | 1,46,496 | 67.23 | BJP | Debasish Roy | 48,250 | 22.14 | 98,246 | 29 April 2021 |
