= Dipsita Dhar =

Indian student activist (born 1993)

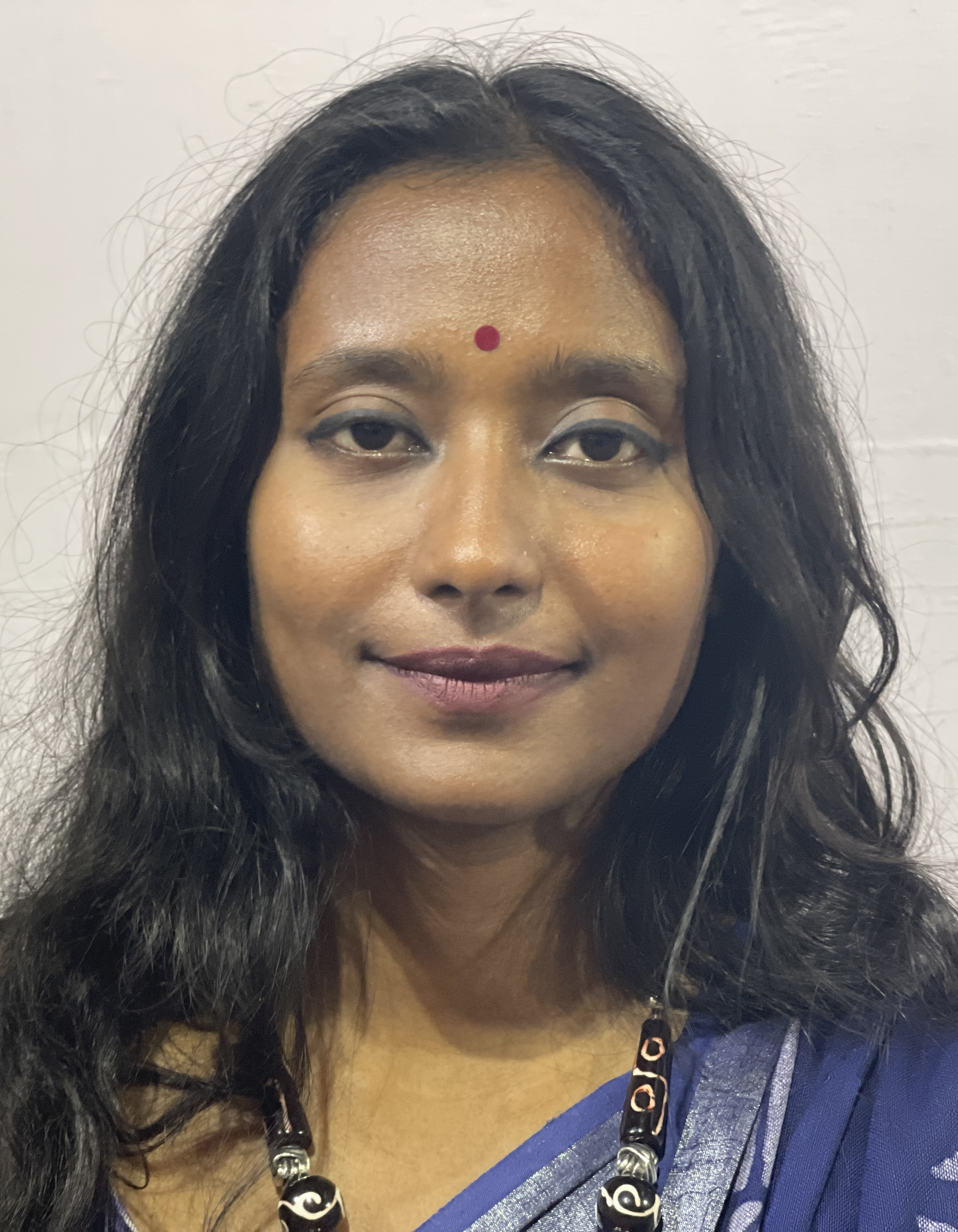
- Dipsita Dhar in 2022
- Born: 9 August 1993 (age 33); Howrah, West Bengal, India
- Education: BA (Geography), Asutosh College; MA, MPhil, PhD (Population Studies), Jawaharlal Nehru University
- Occupations: Student activist; Politician
- Organization: Students' Federation of India
- Known for: All India SFI leader; social worker; motivational speaker
- Notable work: Red Volunteer
- Height: 5 ft 5 in (165 cm)
- Political party: Communist Party of India (Marxist)
- Relatives: Padma Nidhi Dhar (grandfather)

Dipsita Dhar (born 9 August 1993) is an Indian politician and student activist. She serves as the All-India Joint Secretary of the Students' Federation of India. She was the CPI(M) candidate for the Bally constituency in the 2021 West Bengal Legislative Assembly election. She contested the 2024 Indian general election as a CPI(M) candidate from Serampore but lost.

== Early life and education ==
Dipsita Dhar was born in Howrah, West Bengal on 9 August 1993 to Pijush Dhar and Dipika Thakur Chakraborty. She graduated with a degree in geography from Asutosh College in Southern Kolkata. She completed her Post Graduation and MPhil in geography from Jawaharlal Nehru University, New Delhi. She did her PhD in Population Geography at Jawaharlal Nehru University and her fieldwork was in Kerala.

== Political life ==
=== Student politics ===
Dipsita Dhar started her organisational activities through Kishore Bahini, a children's group in West Bengal. She then joined Students' Federation of India (SFI) at Asutosh College, Southern Kolkata and became the acting president of SFI College Unit and later the District Committee member of Kolkata. She joined Jawaharlal Nehru University in 2013 and became the Councillor for School of Social Sciences, the first victory in JNUSU for SFI after its disruption in 2012. She unsuccessfully contested for the post of JNUSU vice president in 2015. She later became the unit president and secretary of SFI unit in JNU. She was elected as the vice president of SFI in Delhi State Committee in 2015. She then became the Central Committee Member and Central Secretariat Member of SFI. In 2017 convention at Vijayawada in Andhra Pradesh, Dipsita became the SFI's All India Girls Student Sub Committee Convener. She again got re-elected as the SFI's All India Girls Student Sub Committee Convener in a convention held at Sikar, Rajasthan in 2021. Dipsita was also part of the Student Politician Delegation to United Kingdom along with 8 others from India, organised by the British High Commission, New Delhi in 2015.

In 2018, All India Conference of SFI at Shimla, Himachal Pradesh, she was elected as the All India Joint Secretary of SFI. She has faced attack from Delhi Police for the participation in political movements including Justice for Rohit Vemula movement. Her street slogans during the anti-CAA protests helped more people connect with the political cause. During the Shaheen Bagh sit-in protests in Delhi against CAA, she was active in organising protests in Votebagan and Pilkhan of Howrah, West Bengal. She was one of the Panelist in Global Indian Progressive Panel held on 2 October 2020. She frequently appears on India's English, Hindi and Bengali visual media as a panelist in political debates.

==== Gender issues ====
She has been a public advocate and activist for several gender issues, including against violence and abuse of women. In 2016, as the president, Student Federation of India, Jawaharlal Nehru University Unit, she told Al Jazeera, "The patriarchal Indian culture is to be blamed for the rape and abuse cases. If women are not considered equal to men, they will be vulnerable to abuse within the family. Indian women need to be educated about their rights so that they can fight and defend themselves against all kinds of abuse." She has also advocated for girl students to organize and speak out against violence against women and girls. In 2019, as the SFI national girls’ convener, she addressed female students in a speech, noting ongoing violence against women and girls, and spoke of a lack of basics, including toilets, at state-run schools. In 2019, as the All India Joint Secretary of SFI, she spoke out against the ICC process for addressing sexual harassment allegations.

She has also been an organizer of the 2017 campaign to send sanitary napkins to union ministers after its taxation (bleed without fear campaign). In 2017, as a member of Central Executive Committee of SFI, she said, "Sanitary pads should be considered as a health necessity and ideally to be provided to every underprivileged girl for free or in nominal cost, as a large sections of them, due to social taboo and economic reasons cannot not attain a satisfactory menstrual hygiene." During the COVID-19 lockdown in India, the SFI committee freely distributed sanitary napkins as a part of the campaign. She said the Covid-19 pandemic has increased the dropout rates in schools and colleges, and girl students got most affected.

==== LGBTQIA rights ====
She has publicly expressed support for the LGBTQIA community as the joint secretary of SFI and a candidate in the 2021 Bengal Assembly Elections during a meeting organized by the group Left for Rainbow Rights.

==== Higher education ====
She is a vocal figure on policy issues in Indian Higher Education. She has also led the SFI delegation to the Union Ministry for addressing the under representation of marginalised students in Indian Institutes of Technology's (IIT) and frequently advocates against caste oppression in India. She played a crucial role in Nabanna agitation in West Bengal that demanded employment and education for youth and the protests after the murder of CPI(M) activist Maidul Islam Midda.

Red Volunteer

She played a instrumental role in organising red volunteer, a civic action group in West Bengal, which provided medicines, oxygen, home-cooked food, sanitary napkin, to those affected adversely by COVID-19 pandemic.

=== 2021 West Bengal Legislative Assembly election ===
Dipsita Dhar contested against Dr. Rana Chatterjee from All India Trinamool Congress and Baishali Dalmiya from Bharatiya Janata Party at Bally (Vidhan Sabha Constituency), West Bengal. She lost the seat to TMC's Dr. Rana Chatterjee with a margin of more than 30,000 votes. As part of her campaign, she has said, "Hindus and Muslims all feel hungry in the same manner. Hunger does not distinguish between communities." She has also said, "Education has to be a fundamental right. Babasaheb Ambedkar, while writing the Constitution, understood that education can be a very important tool for mobility. [...] Education was not just an avenue to gain knowledge but a vessel to fight oppression." She also gave high importance for youth's employment issue in her campaign. Social activist and celebrities including Kafeel Khan and Rahul Banerjee extended support for her campaign. The Wire described her as the " New Face of Left Politics in Bengal." However, she lost the election and gathered 16.20% votes.

=== 2026 West Bengal Legislative Assembly election ===
Dipsita Dhar contested against Sourav Sikdar from Bharatiya Janata Party and Dr. Chandrima Bhattacharya from All India Trinamool Congress at Dum Dum Uttar (Vidhan Sabha Constituency), West Bengal securing just 17.21% placing at 3rd place .

== Works ==
1. Dhar, Dipsita (July 28, 2020). Black Lives Matter Should Inspire a Challenge to Caste and Religious Oppression in India, Jacobin.
2. Dhar, Dipsita (July 30, 2020). Vanilla Or Chocolate Fudge? What NEP 2020 Offers Is A Fatal Illusion Of Choice, Outlook.
3. Dhar, Dipsita (October 12, 2020). Rape, A Caste Continuum, Outlook.

== Personal life ==
She is the granddaughter of Padma Nidhi Dhar, the three time Member of Legislative Assembly (MLA) in Domjur, Howrah district. She is also the cousin of Shovan Ganguly, the Bengali play back singer.
