= Padma Nidhi Dhar =

Indian politician (1935–2020)

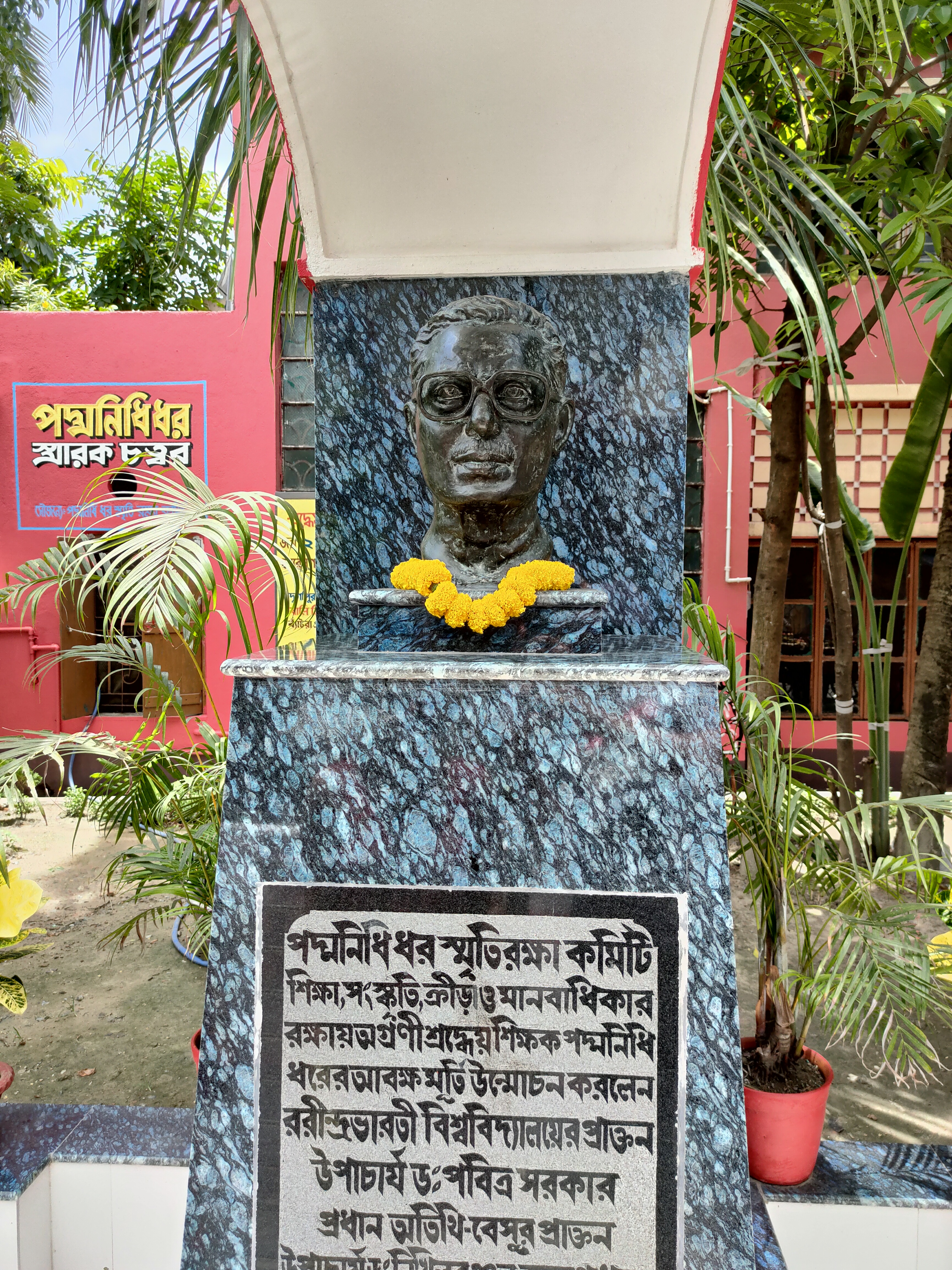
- Padma Nidhi Dhar Memorial

Member of West Bengal Legislative Assembly
- In office 1991–2006
- Constituency: Domjur

Personal details
- Born: 21 July 1935 Baisari, Backergunge District, British India (present day Banaripara Upazila, Barisal District, Bangladesh.
- Died: 11 July 2020 (aged 84)
- Party: Communist Party of India (Marxist)

Padma Nidhi Dhar (21 July 1935 – 11 July 2020) was a three time MLA from Domjur. He was elected to West Bengal State Assembly in 1991, 1996 and 2001 from Communist Party of India (Marxist).

== Life and politics ==
He was born on 21 July 1935 in Baisari village of Backergunge District of undivided Bengal. His family moved to West Bengal when he was in the ninth grade at Baisari High School and lived in a rented house in Tiffin Bazaar area. He completed his schooling from Bally Jora Ashwathtala School and did his graduation from Surendranath College of Kolkata. Later he pursued master's degrees in Bengali and History as a private student. He worked as a rail hawker. He died on 11 July 2020. He is the grandfather of SFI All India Joint Secretary, Dipsita Dhar.

Padma Nidhi Dhar was first jailed on 1956 for a month during the political movement against Bengal Bihar unification. Then in 1966 again he was arrested and jailed for a year in PD act, as he was active in the food movement. He was elected to the Howrah district committee of CPI in 1960. Later he became CPI(M) Howrah district secretariat member.

After his death, Padma Nidhi Dhar memorial trust was formed, where they take up different social, welfare and cultural activities, including blood donation camp, examination workshops etc.
