= Pradip Kumar Bijali =

Indian politician (born 1970)

Pradip Kumar Bijali (born 1970) is an Indian politician from West Bengal. He is a member of West Bengal Legislative Assembly from the Haldia Assembly constituency, which is reserved for Scheduled Caste community, in Purba Medinipur district representing the Bharatiya Janata Party.

== Early life and education ==
Bijali is from Haldia, Purba Medinipur district, West Bengal. He is the son of the late Gouri Sankar Bijali. He studied till Class 10 at Dumdum Ananda Asram Sarada Vidyapith and passed the Madhyamik examinations conducted by the West Bengal Council of Rabindra Open Schooling in June 2022. He was a retired employee of the Haldia Dock Complex, Syama Prasad Mookerjee Port, Kolkata. He declared assets worth Rs.1 crore in his affidavit with the Election Commission of India.

== Career ==
Bijali won the Haldia Assembly constituency, representing the Bharatiya Janata Party in the 2026 West Bengal Legislative Assembly election. He polled 1,32,183 votes and defeated his nearest rival and two time sitting MLA, Tapasi Mondal of the All India Trinamool Congress (AITC), by a margin of 49,062 votes.
