= Baisari =

- Upazila
- Location in Bangladesh
- Coordinates: 22°47.402′N 90°7.881′E
- Country: Bangladesh
- Division: Barisal Division
- District: Barisal District
- Time zone: UTC+6 (BST)

Baisari is a village in Banaripara Upazila in southern Bangladesh and the headquarters of Baisari Union.

== Demography ==
According to the 2011 Bangladesh census, Baisari had 1,013 households and a population of 4,316. 9.3% of the population was under the age of 5. The literacy rate (age 7 and over) was 66.7%, compared to the national average of 51.8%.

== Education ==
There is one college in the village, Syed Bazlul Haque College.

There are two secondary schools, Baisari Secondary School, founded in 1901, and Baisari Secondary Girls School.
