= Sanjay Kumar Singh (Bally politician) =

Indian politician (born 1969)

Sanjay Kumar Singh (born 1969) is an Indian politician from West Bengal. He is a member of the West Bengal Legislative Assembly from the Bally Assembly constituency in Howrah district representing the Bharatiya Janata Party.

== Early life and education ==
Singh is from Howrah, Howrah district, West Bengal. He is the son of the late Ram Narayan Singh. He completed his BCom at Umes Chandra College which is affiliated with University of Calcutta in the year 1988. He runs his own business. His wife is a former councillor of the Howrah Municipal Corporation. He declared assets worth Rs.6.6 crore in his affidavit to the Election Commission of India.

== Career ==
Singh won the Bally Assembly constituency representing the Bharatiya Janata Party in the 2026 West Bengal Legislative Assembly election. He polled 57,639 votes and defeated his nearest rival, Kailash Kumar Mishra of the All India Trinamool Congress, by a margin of 11,997 votes.
