= Rana Chatterjee =

Indian politician

Member of the West Bengal Legislative Assembly
- In office 6 May 2021 – 2026
- Preceded by: Baishali Dalmiya
- Succeeded by: Sanjay Kumar Singh
- Constituency: Bally
- Majority: 6,237

Personal details
- Party: All India Trinamool Congress

Rana Chatterjee is a politician serving as the MLA of Bally constituency, since May 2021. He is a politician from All India Trinamool Congress.

== Life ==
Rana Chatterjee did his Bachelor of Medicine & Surgery from R. G. Kar Medical College, University of Calcutta in 1998. He holds a Diploma in Child Health from R. G. Kar Medical College, University of Calcutta in 2003, DCH (Sydney, Australia), PGPN (Boston).

Consultant Paediatrician at Woodlands Multispeciality Hospital, Belle Vue Hospital (Kolkata)

Spouse: Dr Rituparna Chatterjee (Ophthalmologist)

Children: Rishika Chatterjee

== Political life ==
He contested as All India Trinamool Congress candidate from Bally constituency. He won by a margin of 6,237 votes by defeating Baishali Dalmiya of Bharatiya Janata Party.
