= Bally Assembly constituency =

West Bengal Legislative Assembly constituency

Bally
- Constituency No. 169 for the West Bengal Legislative Assembly
- Interactive Map Outlining Bally Assembly Constituency

Constituency details
- Country: India
- Region: East India
- State: West Bengal
- District: Howrah
- Lok Sabha constituency: Howrah
- Established: 1951
- Total electors: 142,337
- Reservation: None

Member of Legislative Assembly
- 18th West Bengal Legislative Assembly
- Incumbent Sanjay Kumar Singh
- Party: BJP
- Alliance: NDA
- Elected year: 2026

Bally Assembly constituency is an assembly constituency in Howrah district in the Indian state of West Bengal.

== Overview ==
As per orders of the Delimitation Commission, No. 169 Bally Assembly constituency is composed of Bally Municipality which is merged with Howrah Municipal Corporation now.

Bally Assembly constituency is part of No. 25 Howrah (Lok Sabha constituency).

== Members of the Legislative Assembly ==
Year	Member	Party
1951	Ratan Moni Chattopadhyay	Indian National Congress
1957	Motilal Basu	Indian National Congress
1962	Shankar Lal Mukhopadhyay	Indian National Congress
1967	S.N. Mukherjee	Indian National Congress
1969	Patit Paban Pathak	Communist Party of India (Marxist)
1971	Patit Paban Pathak	Communist Party of India (Marxist)
1972	Bhabani Shankar Mukherjee	Indian National Congress
1977	Patit Paban Pathak	Communist Party of India (Marxist)
1982	Patit Paban Pathak	Communist Party of India (Marxist)
1987	Supriyo Basu	Indian National Congress
1991	Patit Paban Pathak	Communist Party of India (Marxist)
1996	Kanika Ganguly	Communist Party of India (Marxist)
2001	Kanika Ganguly	Communist Party of India (Marxist)
2006	Kanika Ganguly	Communist Party of India (Marxist)
2011	Sultan Singh	Trinamool Congress
2016	Baishali Dalmiya	Trinamool Congress
2021	Rana Chatterjee	Trinamool Congress
2026	Sanjay Kumar Singh	Bharatiya Janata Party

== Election results ==
Vote share of Winning candidates
2026	48.91%
2021	42.38%
2016	46.97%
2011	50.42%
2006	59.21%
2001	72.63%
1996	50.54%
1991	50.49%
1987	50.38%
1982	54.26%
1977	59.22%
1972	56.16%
1971	51.25%
1969	53.38%
1967	43.77%
1962	50.56%
1957	48.73%
1951	41.97%

=== 2026 ===
2026 West Bengal Legislative Assembly election: Bally
Party	Candidate	Votes	%	±%
BJP	Sanjay Kumar Singh	57,639	48.91	
AITC	Kailash Kumar Mishra	45,642	38.73	
CPI(M)	Sankar Maitra	11,284	9.58	
INC	Priyanka Choudhury	1,283	1.09	
NOTA	None of the above	924	0.78	
Majority		11,997	10.18	
Turnout		117,838	88.08	
BJP gain from AITC		Swing		

=== 2021 ===
2021 West Bengal Legislative Assembly election: Bally
Party	Candidate	Votes	%	±%
AITC	Rana Chatterjee	53,347	42.38	
BJP	Baishali Dalmiya	47,110	37.43	
CPI(M)	Dipsita Dhar	22,040	17.51	
NOTA	None of the above	1,206	0.96	
SUCI(C)	Putul Chowdhury	442	0.35	
Independents	~7 Independent Candidates	1,728	1.37	
Majority		6,237	4.95	
Turnout		125,873	71.44	
AITC hold		Swing		

=== 2016 ===
2016 West Bengal Legislative Assembly election: Bally
Party	Candidate	Votes	%	±%
AITC	Baishali Dalmiya	52,702	46.97	
CPI(M)	Saumendranath Bera	37,299	33.25	
BJP	Kaushik Chakraborty	17,418	15.53	
NOTA	None of the above	1,598	1.42	
SUCI(C)	Putul Chowdhury	591	0.53	
JD(S)	Punit Kumar Singh	197	0.18	
IND	8 Independent Candidates	2,387	2.13	
Majority		15,403	13.72	
Turnout		112,192	70.15	
AITC hold		Swing		

=== 2011 ===
2011 West Bengal Legislative Assembly election: Bally
Party	Candidate	Votes	%	±%
AITC	Sultan Singh	52,770	50.42	
CPI(M)	Kanika Ganguly	46,170	44.11	
BJP	Bharat Bhushan Ojha	2,677	2.56	
JD(U)	Saumadip Chatterjee	458	0.44	
IND	9 Independent Candidates	2,590	2.47	
Majority		6,600	6.31	
Swing to AITC from CPI(M)		Swing		

=== 2006 ===
2006 West Bengal Legislative Assembly election: Bally
Party	Candidate	Votes	%	±%
CPI(M)	Kanika Ganguly	54,262	59.21	
AITC	Rekha Raut	24,737	26.99	
INC	Tapan Ganguly	9,690	10.57	
IND	4 Independent Candidates	2,462	2.69	
OTH	1 Other Party Candidate	486	0.53	
Majority		29,525	32.22	
CPI(M) hold		Swing		

=== 2001 ===
2001 West Bengal Legislative Assembly election: Bally
Party	Candidate	Votes	%	±%
CPI(M)	Kanika Ganguly	92,876	72.63	
INC	Supriyo Basu	32,423	25.36	
NCP	Mousumni Chatterjee (Dutta)	626	0.49	
IND	6 Independent Candidates	1,945	1.53	
Majority		60,453	47.27	
Turnout		127,892	78.24	
CPI(M) hold		Swing		

=== 1996 ===
1996 West Bengal Legislative Assembly election: Bally
Party	Candidate	Votes	%	±%
CPI(M)	Kanika Ganguly	54,996	50.54	
INC	Bani Kumar Singha	39,369	36.18	
BJP	Rakhal Das	12,903	11.86	
IND	7 Independent Candidates	1,546	1.41	
Majority		15,627	14.36	
Turnout		111,133	70.40	
CPI(M) hold		Swing		

=== 1991 ===
1991 West Bengal Legislative Assembly election: Bally
Party	Candidate	Votes	%	±%
CPI(M)	Patit Paban Pathak	47,719	50.49	
INC	Supryo Basu	33,999	35.97	
BJP	Rakhal Ch Das	10,696	11.32	
IPF	Kalyan Goswami	977	1.03	
BSP	Mukesh Kansal	274	0.29	
IND	5 Independent Candidates	844	0.89	
Majority		13,720	14.52	
Turnout		96,343	65.76	
CPI(M) hold		Swing		

=== 1987 ===
1987 West Bengal Legislative Assembly election: Bally
Party	Candidate	Votes	%	±%
INC	Supriya Basu	43,575	50.38	
CPI(M)	Patitpaban Pathak	41,841	48.38	
IND	4 Independent Candidates	1,075	1.24	
Majority		1,734	2.00	
Turnout		88,080	69.29	
Swing to INC from CPI(M)		Swing		

=== 1982 ===
1982 West Bengal Legislative Assembly election: Bally
Party	Candidate	Votes	%	±%
CPI(M)	Patit Paban Pathak	39,970	54.26	
INC	Bani Kumar Singha	31,963	43.39	
SUCI(C)	Sarat Chandra Chattopadhyay	926	1.26	
IND	Madan Kumar Singh	516	0.70	
IND	Salendranath Ghosh	291	0.40	
Majority		8,007	10.87	
Turnout		75,573	64.97	
CPI(M) hold		Swing		

=== 1977 ===
1977 West Bengal Legislative Assembly election: Bally
Party	Candidate	Votes	%	±%
CPI(M)	Patipaban Pathak	28,632	59.22	
INC	Ganesh Pathak	12,353	25.55	
IND	Tarak Banerjee	3,773	7.80	
JP	Bhabani Sankar Mukherjee	3,407	7.05	
IND	Madan Kumar Singh	183	0.38	
Majority		16,279	33.67	
Turnout		49,097	46.95	
Swing to CPI(M) from INC		Swing		

=== 1972 ===
1972 West Bengal Legislative Assembly election: Bally
Party	Candidate	Votes	%	±%
INC	Bhabani Sankar Mukherjee	28,857	56.16	
CPI(M)	Patit Pabon Pathak	22,522	43.84	
Majority		6,335	12.32	
Turnout		52,873	58.70	
Swing to INC from CPI(M)		Swing		

=== 1971 ===
1971 West Bengal Legislative Assembly election: Bally
Party	Candidate	Votes	%	±%
CPI(M)	Patit Paban Pathak	24,233	51.25	
INC	Bhabani Sankar Mukherjee	19,060	40.31	
INC(O)	Trak Nath Banerjee	2,711	5.73	
Bangla Congress	Gopal Mukherjee	784	1.66	
SSP	Rameswar Tiwari	292	0.62	
PSP	Srikant Pathak	201	0.43	
Majority		5,173	10.94	
Turnout		48,941	46.01	
CPI(M) hold		Swing		

=== 1969 ===
1969 West Bengal Legislative Assembly election: Bally
Party	Candidate	Votes	%	±%
CPI(M)	Patit Paban Pathak	33,912	53.38	
INC	Sailendra Nath Mukherjee	28,633	45.07	
PBI (Note: Proutist Bloc India)	Sailendra Nath Bhosh	836	1.32	
NDF	Sourendra Nath Mukherjee	151	0.24	
Majority		5,279	8.31	
Turnout		64,891	61.42	
Swing to CPI(M) from INC		Swing		

=== 1967 ===
1967 West Bengal Legislative Assembly election: Bally
Party	Candidate	Votes	%	±%
INC	S. N. Mukhrjee	25,632	43.77	
CPI(M)	P. P. Pathak	23,469	40.07	
Bangla Congress	S. Mukhrjee	7,649	13.06	
IND	M. K. Singh	1,815	3.10	
Majority		2,163	3.70	
Turnout		61,133	60.72	
INC hold		Swing		

=== 1962 ===
1962 West Bengal Legislative Assembly election: Bally
Party	Candidate	Votes	%	±%
INC	Shahkar Lal Mukharjee	27,322	50.56	
CPI	Patit Paban Pathak	25,195	46.62	
ABJS	Sukumar Chowdhury	1,526	2.82	
Majority		2,127	3.94	
Turnout		55,622	56.70	
INC hold		Swing		

=== 1957 ===
1957 West Bengal Legislative Assembly election: Bally
Party	Candidate	Votes	%	±%
INC	Monilal Basu	16,600	48.73	
CPI	Biren Banerjee	16,048	47.11	
IND	Biswanath Das	993	2.91	
IND	Chandreswar Prasad Singha	426	1.25	
Majority		552	1.62	
Turnout		34,067	32.73	
INC hold		Swing		

=== 1951 ===
1951 West Bengal Legislative Assembly election: Bally
Party	Candidate	Votes	%	±%
INC	Ratan Moni Chattopadhyaya	8,950	41.97	
FBL(MG) (Note: Forward Bloc (Marxist Group))	Saroj Ghosal	6,297	29.53	
IND	Hemonta Dey	1,863	8.74	
IND	Subodh Chandra Pal	1,474	6.91	
ABJS	Abani Mohan Mukherjee	1,051	4.93	
CPI	Patit Paban Pathak	870	4.08	
Socialist	Ram Chandra Sharma	401	1.88	
IND	Narsingh Singh	147	0.69	
RRP	Banarasi Das Sarma	140	0.66	
IND	Nityananda Bhaduri	132	0.62	
Majority		2,653	12.44	
Turnout		21,325	41.93	
INC win (new seat)				
