= Samir Kumar Panja =

Indian politician

Member of the West Bengal Legislative Assembly
- Incumbent
- Assumed office 2011
- Preceded by: Chandralekha Bag
- Constituency: Udaynarayanpur

Personal details
- Party: AITC (until 2026); Democratic Trinamool Congress (from 2026)
- Profession: Politician

Samir Kumar Panja is an Indian politician member of Democratic Trinamool Congress. He is an MLA, elected from the Udaynarayanpur constituency in the 2011 West Bengal Legislative Assembly election. In 2016 and 2021 assembly election he was re-elected from the same constituency.
