= Udaynarayanpur Assembly constituency =

Udaynarayanpur
- Constituency No. 182 for the West Bengal Legislative Assembly
- Interactive Map Outlining Udaynarayanpur Assembly Constituency

Constituency details
- Country: India
- Region: East India
- State: West Bengal
- District: Howrah
- Lok Sabha constituency: Uluberia
- Established: 1962
- Total electors: 190,722
- Reservation: None

Member of Legislative Assembly
- 18th West Bengal Legislative Assembly
- Incumbent Samir Kumar Panja
- Party: Democratic Trinamool Congress
- Elected year: 2026

Udaynarayanpur Assembly constituency is an assembly constituency in Howrah district in the Indian state of West Bengal.

== Overview ==
As per orders of the Delimitation Commission, No. 182 Udaynarayanpur Assembly constituency is composed of the following: Udaynarayanpur community development block, and Anulia, Balichak, Basantapur, Kanpur and Khosalpur gram panchayats of Amta I community development block.

Udaynarayanpur Assembly constituency is part of No. 26 Uluberia (Lok Sabha constituency).

== Members of the Legislative Assembly ==
Year	Name	Party
1962	Arabinda Roy	Indian National Congress
1967	Pannalal Maji	Communist Party of India
1969	Pannalal Maji	Communist Party of India
1971	Pannalal Maji	Communist Party of India
1972	Saroj Karar	Indian National Congress
1977	Pannalal Maji	Communist Party of India
1982	Pannalal Maji	Communist Party of India
1987	Pannalal Maji	Communist Party of India
1991	Pannalal Maji	Communist Party of India
1996	Nani Gopal Chowdhury	Communist Party of India
2001	Nani Gopal Chowdhury	Communist Party of India
2006	Chandralekha Bag	Communist Party of India
2011	Samir Kumar Panja	All India Trinamool Congress
2016	Samir Kumar Panja	All India Trinamool Congress
2021	Samir Kumar Panja	All India Trinamool Congress
2026	Samir Kumar Panja	All India Trinamool Congress

== Election results ==
=== 2026 ===
2026 West Bengal Legislative Assembly election: Udaynarayanpur
Party	Candidate	Votes	%	±%
AITC	Samir Kumar Panja	105,802	49.53	−1.68
BJP	Prabhakar Pandit	93,575	43.81	−0.34
CPI(M)	Shasthi Maji	7,849	3.67	
NOTA	None of the above	1,022	0.48	−0.14
Majority		12,227	5.72	−1.34
Turnout		213,603	93.15	+8.97
AITC hold		Swing		

=== 2021 ===
2021 West Bengal Legislative Assembly election: Udaynarayanpur constituency
Party	Candidate	Votes	%	±%
AITC	Samir Kumar Panja	101,510	51.21	
BJP	Sumit Ranjan Karar	87,512	44.15	+39.56
INC	Aloke Koley	5,178	2.61	−36.45
NOTA	None of the above	1,220	0.62	
Majority		13,998	7.06	
Turnout		198,211	84.18	
AITC hold		Swing		

=== 2016 ===
West Bengal assembly elections, 2016: Udaynarayanpur constituency
Party	Candidate	Votes	%	±%
AITC	Samir Kumar Panja	94,828	52.12	−2.99
INC	Saroj Ranjan Karar	71,070	39.06	
BJP	Samui Bhola	8,356	4.59	+2.34.
Indian Unity Centre	Satyanarayan Rajwar	2,466		
NOTA	None of the above	1,971	1.08	
Independent	Banamali Gayen	1,415	0.78	
Independent	Pradip Maiti	1,120	0.62	
Independent	Debananda Maji	705	0.39	
Turnout		181,931	87.42	−2.30
AITC hold		Swing		

=== 2011 ===
West Bengal assembly elections, 2011: Udaynarayanpur constituency
Party	Candidate	Votes	%	±%
AITC	Samir Panja	91,879	55.11	+8.45#
CPI(M)	Chandralekha Bag	67,988	40.78	−9.13
BJP	Tapan Dhara	3,746	2.25	
Independent	Narayan Chandra Bhunyia	1,724		
Independent	Gobinda Pandit	1,386		
Turnout		166,723	87.42	
AITC gain from CPI(M)		Swing	17.58#	

.# Swing calculated on Congress+Trinamool Congress vote percentages taken together in 2006.

=== 2006 ===
In the 2006 state assembly elections, Chandralekha Bag of CPI(M) won the Udaynarayanpur seat defeating her nearest rival Samir Kumar Panja of Trinamool Congress. Contests in most years were multi cornered but only winners and runners are being mentioned. Nani Gopal Chowdhury of CPI(M) defeated Sukhendu Sekhar Roy of Trinamool Congress in 2001 and Shyamal Ranjan Karar of Congress in 1996. Pannalal Maji of CPI(M) defeated Saroj Ranjan Karar of Congress in 1991, 1987, 1982 and 1977.

=== 1977 ===
Saroj Karar of Congress won in 1972. Pannalal Maji of CPI(M) won in 1971, 1969 and 1967. Arabinda Roy of Congress won in 1962. Prior to that the Udaynarayanpur seat did not exist.
