= Haldia Assembly constituency =

Haldia
- Constituency No. 209 for the West Bengal Legislative Assembly
- Interactive Map Outlining Haldia Assembly Constituency

Constituency details
- Country: India
- Region: East India
- State: West Bengal
- District: Purba Medinipur
- Lok Sabha constituency: Tamluk
- Established: 2011
- Total electors: 188,135
- Reservation: SC

Member of Legislative Assembly
- 18th West Bengal Legislative Assembly
- Incumbent Pradip Kumar Bijali
- Party: BJP
- Alliance: NDA
- Elected year: 2026
- Preceded by: Tapasi Mondal

Haldia Assembly constituency is an assembly constituency in Purba Medinipur district in the Indian state of West Bengal. It is reserved for scheduled castes.

== Overview ==
As per orders of the Delimitation Commission, No. 209 Haldia Assembly constituency (SC) is composed of the following: Haldia municipality and Sutahata community development block.

Haldia Assembly constituency is part of No. 30 Tamluk Lok Sabha constituency.

== Members of the Legislative Assembly ==
Year	Name	Party
2011	Seuli Saha	Trinamool Congress
2016	Tapasi Mondal	Communist Party of India (Marxist)
2021	Tapasi Mondal	Bharatiya Janata Party
2026	Pradip Kumar Bijali	Bharatiya Janata Party

== Election results ==
=== 2026 ===
2026 West Bengal Legislative Assembly election: Haldia
Party	Candidate	Votes	%	±%
BJP	Pradip Kumar Bijali	132,183	55.2	▲8.05
AITC	Tapasi Mondal	83,121	34.71	▼5.65
CPI(M)	Asoke Kumar Patra	19,121	7.99	▼2.28
NOTA	None of the above	1,066	0.45	▼0.19
Majority		49,062	20.49	▲13.7
Turnout		239,446	94.98	▲7.02
BJP hold		Swing		

=== 2021 ===
2021 West Bengal Legislative Assembly election: Haldia
Party	Candidate	Votes	%	±%
BJP	Tapasi Mondal (Note: Tapasi Mondal was elected as a BJP MLA. However, on 10 March 2025, she defected to the Trinamool Congress)	104,126	47.15	
AITC	Swapan Naskar	89,118	40.36	
CPI(M)	Karpaik Manika	22,688	10.27	
NOTA	None of the above	1,413	0.64	
Majority		15,008	6.79	
Turnout		220,823	87.96	
BJP gain from CPI(M)		Swing		

=== 2016 ===
2016 West Bengal Legislative Assembly election: Haldia
Party	Candidate	Votes	%	±%
CPI(M)	Tapasi Mondal	101,330	50.17	▲5.66
AITC	Madhurima Mandal	79,837	39.53	▼11.81
BJP	Pradip Kumar Bijali	13,471	6.67	▲4.01
BHNP	Abhimanyu Mondal	2,996	1.48	New
NOTA	None of the Above	2,383	1.18	New
PDS	Utpal Dalui	1,005	0.5	New
SUCI(C)	Narayan Pramanik	959	0.47	New
Majority		21,493	10.64	▲3.81
Turnout		2,01,981	90.42	▼2.06
CPI(M) gain from AITC		Swing		

=== 2011 ===
2011 West Bengal Legislative Assembly election: Haldia
Party	Candidate	Votes	%	±%
AITC	Seuli Saha	89,573	51.34	
CPI(M)	Nityananda Bera	77,649	44.51	
BJP	Kalipada Das	4,640	2.66	
INL	Basanti Manna (Patra)	1,332	0.76	
Independent	Debaprasad Mandal	1,275	0.73	
Majority		11,924	6.83	
Turnout		1,74,469	92.74	
AITC win (new seat)				
