= Tapasi Mondal =

Indian politician (born 1972)

Member of the West Bengal Legislative Assembly
- In office 2016–2026
- Preceded by: Seuli Saha
- Succeeded by: Pradip Kumar Bijali
- Constituency: Haldia

Personal details
- Born: 1 March 1972 (age 54)
- Party: Trinamool Congress (2025–present)
- Other political affiliations: Bharatiya Janata Party (2020–2025); Communist Party of India (Marxist) (until 2020)

Tapasi Mondal (born 1 March 1972) is an Indian politician and member of the West Bengal Legislative Assembly representing Haldia constituency from 2016. She was elected as a Communist Party of India (Marxist) member. In 2020, she joined Bharatiya Janata Party. She switched to TMC in 2025.

== Personal life ==
Mondal is married to Arjun Kumar Mondal and is a resident of Durgachak town in the district of Purba Medinipur, West Bengal. She received her education at the Sutahata Labanyaprava Balika Vidyalya.

== Political career ==
In the 2016 West Bengal Legislative Assembly election, Tapasi Mondal was nominated to contest as the candidate of the Left Front coalition in West Bengal from the Haldia constituency of Purba Medinipur district. Her primary opponent in the election was Madhurima Mandal who was the candidate of the Trinamool Congress. The election resulted in Tapasi Mondal emerging as the winning candidate with a margin of over 21,000 votes and polling at 50.17% of the votes cast against 39.53% of the votes cast in favor of Madhurima Mandal. In December 2020, she was expelled from her party after she declared that she intended to join the Bharatiya Janata Party along with a number of Trinamool Congress legislators.
