= Baishali Dalmiya =

Indian politician

Member of West Bengal Legislative Assembly
- In office 2016 – 2 May 2021
- Preceded by: Sultan Singh
- Succeeded by: Rana Chatterjee
- Constituency: Bally

Personal details
- Party: Bharatiya Janata Party (2021-present)
- Other political affiliations: Trinamool Congress (2015-2021)
- Parent: Jagmohan Dalmiya (father)
- Occupation: Social Worker; Politician

Baishali Dalmiya is an Indian politician and businesswoman. She serves as the director of the construction company M L Dalmiya & Co. Ltd. She is a former member of the West Bengal Legislative Assembly. From 2016 to April 2021 she represented the Bally Assembly Constituency. She is daughter of Indian cricket administrator and businessman Jagmohan Dalmiya.

She joined politics in 2016, shortly after her father's death, and joined the All India Trinamool Congress, was given the ticket to contest the assembly election from the Bally Assembly Constituency, and was subsequently elected to the state assembly.

On 22 January 2021, Baishali Dalmiya was expelled from All India Trinamool Congress for anti-party activities. On 30 January 2021, she joined the Bharatiya Janata Party along with Rajib Banerjee, Prabir Ghoshal, Rathin Chakraborty and Rudranil Ghosh in presence of Amit Shah in New Delhi. She unsuccessfully contested the 2021 West Bengal Assembly Election from the Bally Assembly Constituency as the Bharatiya Janata Party candidate and lost to the All India Trinamool Congress candidate Dr. Rana Chatterjee.

== Controversies ==
On 13 April 2015, the Calcutta Leather Complex Tanner's Association filed a complaint of cheating and misappropriation of funds against M L Dalmiya & Co. Ltd. and its directors which included Baishali Dalmiya and her brother Avishek Dalmiya. According to General Secretary Imran Ahmed Khan, the Police visited the site to conduct a probe and turned the complaint into an FIR (no. 90/15). On 5 March 2021, the then All India Trinamool Congress election agent Rana Chatterjee filed complaint with the Election Commission to take action against Baishali Dalmiya for suppression of material facts and not providing proper information regarding criminal antecedent in her nomination document.

State Legislative Assembly
Preceded by Sultan Singh	Member of the West Bengal Legislative Assembly from Bally Assembly constituency 2016–	Incumbent
