= Suvendu Adhikari ministry =

Current cabinet of the state of West Bengal since 2026

- 22nd Ministry of West Bengal

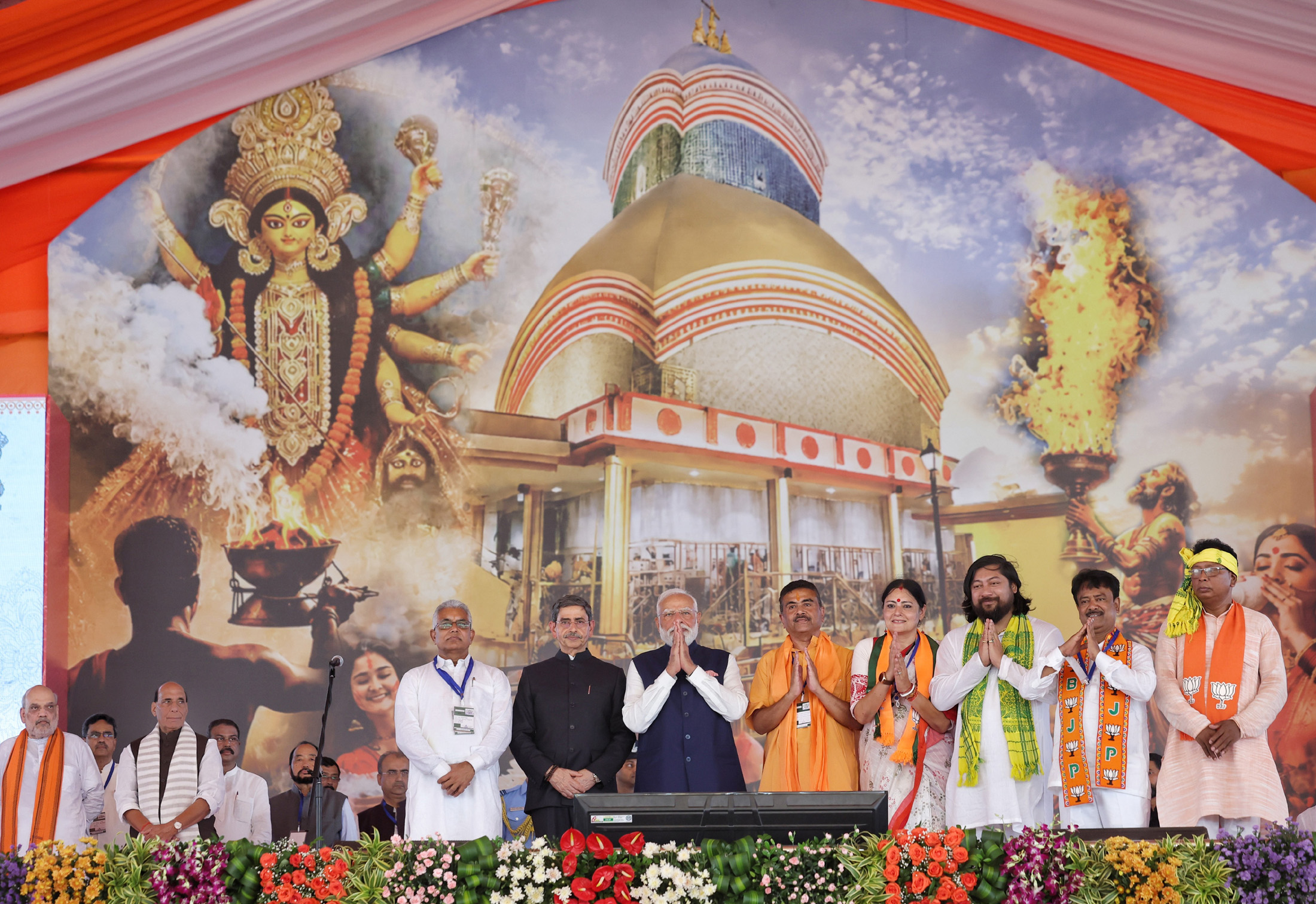
- After cabinet oath on 9 May 2026 at Brigade Parade Ground, Kolkata
- Date formed: 9 May 2026

People and organisations
- Governor: R. N. Ravi
- Chief Minister: Suvendu Adhikari
- No. of ministers: 19 Cabinet Ministers; 3 Ministers of state (I/C) (Note: I/C stands for independent charge. It means that a minister can hold portfolios independently in a junior rank.); 19 Ministers of state
- Ministers removed: 0
- Total no. of members: 41
- Member parties: Bharatiya Janata Party
- Status in legislature: Majority
- Opposition party: Democratic Trinamool Congress
- Opposition leader: Ritabrata Banerjee

History
- Incoming formation: 18th West Bengal Assembly
- Election: 2026
- Legislature term: 197 days
- Budget: 2026 budget of West Bengal
- Predecessor: Third Mamata Banerjee ministry

The Suvendu Adhikari ministry is the State Council of Ministers of West Bengal headed by Chief Minister of West Bengal Suvendu Adhikari, which was formed after the 2026 West Bengal Legislative Assembly election held in two phases on 23 and 29 April 2026. The results of the election were announced on 4 May 2026, leading to the formation of the 18th Vidhan Sabha. Suvendu Adhikari sworn in as the Chief Minister (CM) on 9 May 2026 along with 5 other council of Ministers. 35 MLAs took oath as ministers on 1 June. The oath ceremony was arranged for West Bengal Chief Minister Suvendu Adhikari and his cabinet ministers was held at the iconic Brigade Parade Ground in Kolkata.

== History ==
Suvendu Adhikari ministry came into existence following the 2026 West Bengal Legislative Assembly election to the 18th Vidhan Sabha in which the Bharatiya Janata Party alone emerged victorious winning 208 of the 294 seats of the Vidhan Sabha (West Bengal).

Chief Minister Suvendu Adhikari chaired his 1st Cabinet meeting on Monday, May 11, 2026 followed by 2nd Cabinet meeting on Monday, May 18, 2026, at the state secretariat Nabanna in Kolkata & later the others Union Council of Ministers were released shortly on 1 June 2026 for cabinet expansion.

29 out of 40 Ministers (73%) in Suvendu Adhikari Ministry have declared criminal cases against themselves as per report of Association for Democratic Reforms (ADR) and West Bengal Election Watch. Of these, 25 Ministers (63%) have declared serious criminal cases against themselves like attempted murder, heinous crimes against women, vulgar & abusive speeches etc. 1 Minister has declared case related to murder (IPC section 302). 10 Ministers have declared cases related to attempt to murder (IPC Section 307). 12 Ministers have declared cases related to crimes against women & 10 Ministers have declared cases related to Hate Speeches as per official analysis report of ADR & based on the Election Commission of India (ECI) affidavits submitted by the ministers prior to West Bengal 2026 Assembly Elections.

== List of Ministers ==
The following is the complete list of the Cabinet Ministers, Ministers of State of West Bengal:

Portrait	Portfolio	Minister	Took office	Left office	Party					
Portrait	Portfolio	Minister	Took office	Left office	Party	Chief Minister: Home and Hill Affairs; Land and Land Reforms & Refugee Relief and Rehabilitation; Power; Information and Cultural Affairs; Personnel and Administrative Reforms; Other Department not allotted to other Ministers.	Suvendu Adhikari	9 May 2026	Incumbent	BJP
Cabinet Ministers
	North Bengal Development; Water Resources Investigation and Development	Nisith Pramanik	9 May 2026	Incumbent	BJP					
	Food and Supplies; Co-operation	Ashok Kirtania	9 May 2026	Incumbent	BJP					
	Panchayats and Rural Development; Agricultural Marketing	Dilip Ghosh	9 May 2026	Incumbent	BJP					
	Tribal Development; Minority Affairs and Madrasah Education	Kshudiram Tudu	9 May 2026	Incumbent	BJP					
	Urban Development and Municipal Affairs	Agnimitra Paul	9 May 2026	Incumbent	BJP					
	School Education; Micro, Small & Medium Enterprises and Textiles; Housing	Dipak Barman	1 June 2026	Incumbent	BJP					
	Industry, Commerce and Enterprises; Public Enterprises and Industrial Reconstruction; Non-Conventional and Renewable Energy Sources	Tapas Roy	1 June 2026	Incumbent	BJP					
	Parliamentary Affairs; Tourism	Shankar Ghosh	1 June 2026	Incumbent	BJP					
	Environment; Forests	Manoj Kumar Oraon	1 June 2026	Incumbent	BJP					
	Transport; Labour	Arjun Singh	1 June 2026	Incumbent	BJP					
	Backward Classes Welfare; Mass Education Extension and Library Services	Gouri Shankar Ghosh	1 June 2026	Incumbent	BJP					
	Higher Education; Technical Education, Training & Skill Development	Jagannath Chattopadhyay	1 June 2026	Incumbent	BJP					
	Finance	Swapan Dasgupta	1 June 2026	Incumbent	BJP					
	Information Technology and Electronics; Science and Technology and Bio-Technology; Food Processing Industries and Horticulture	Kalyan Chakraborty	1 June 2026	Incumbent	BJP					
	Health and Family Welfare	Sharadwat Mukherjee	1 June 2026	Incumbent	BJP					
	Irrigation and Waterways	Arup Kumar Das	1 June 2026	Incumbent	BJP					
	Public Health Engineering; Public Works Department (PWD)	Ajay Kumar Poddar	1 June 2026	Incumbent	BJP					
	Agriculture	Dudh Kumar Mondal	1 June 2026	Incumbent	BJP					
Ministers of State (Independent Charge)
	Women and Child Development and Social Welfare; Self Help Group and Self Employment; Programme Monitoring	Malati Rava Roy	1 June 2026	Incumbent	BJP					
	Animal Resources Development; Fisheries	Rajesh Mahata	1 June 2026	Incumbent	BJP					
	Youth Services and Sports; Consumer Affairs	Indranil Khan	1 June 2026	Incumbent	BJP					
Ministers of State
	Tribal Development; Irrigation and Waterways	Joyel Murmu	1 June 2026	Incumbent	BJP					
	Higher Education; Technical Education, Training & Skill Development	Hare Krishna Bera	1 June 2026	Incumbent	BJP					
	Finance; Transport	Anandamay Barman	1 June 2026	Incumbent	BJP					
	Agricultural Marketing; Micro, Small & Medium Enterprises and Textiles	Ashok Dinda	1 June 2026	Incumbent	BJP					
	Public Works Department (PWD); Backward Classes Welfare	Nadiar Chand Bouri	1 June 2026	Incumbent	BJP					
	Home and Hill Affairs; Minority Affairs and Madrasah Education	Bishal Lama	1 June 2026	Incumbent	BJP					
	Food and Supplies; Panchayats and Rural Development	Santanu Pramanik	1 June 2026	Incumbent	BJP					
	Industry, Commerce and Enterprises; Science and Technology and Biotechnology	Moumita Biswas Mishra	1 June 2026	Incumbent	BJP					
	Parliamentary Affairs; Urban Development and Municipal Affairs	Umesh Rai	1 June 2026	Incumbent	BJP					
	Information and Cultural Affairs; Tourism	Purnima Chakraborty	1 June 2026	Incumbent	BJP					
	School Education; Fire and Emergency Services	Koushik Chowdhury	1 June 2026	Incumbent	BJP					
	Public Health Engineering; Labour	Bhaskar Bhattacharya	1 June 2026	Incumbent	BJP					
	Co-operation; Environment; Forests	Dibakar Gharami	1 June 2026	Incumbent	BJP					
	Food Processing Industries and Horticulture; Agriculture	Amiya Kisku	1 June 2026	Incumbent	BJP					
	Housing	Kalita Maji	1 June 2026	Incumbent	BJP					
	Power; Non-Conventional and Renewable Energy Sources	Gargi Das Ghosh	1 June 2026	Incumbent	BJP					
	Law; Judicial; North Bengal Development	Biraj Biswas	1 June 2026	Incumbent	BJP					
	Land and Land Reforms & Refugee Relief and Rehabilitation; Sundarban Affairs	Dipankar Jana	1 June 2026	Incumbent	BJP					
	Health and Family Welfare	Sumana Sarkar	1 June 2026	Incumbent	BJP					

Representation of Cabinet Ministers by district
1. Cooch Behar (4.88%)
2. North 24 Parganas (9.75%)
3. Paschim Medinipur (2.44%)
4. Paschim Bardhaman (4.88%)
5. Bankura (4.88%)
6. Kolkata (9.75%)
7. Alipurduar (7.31%)
8. Birbhum (4.88%)
9. Darjeeling (4.88%)
10. Hooghly (4.88%)
11. Howrah (2.44%)
12. Jhargram (4.88%)
13. Malda (2.44%)
14. Murshidabad (4.88%)
15. Purba Bardhaman (4.88%)
16. Purba Medinipur (9.75%)
17. Purulia (2.44%)
18. South 24 Parganas (4.88%)
19. Uttar Dinajpur (4.88%)

== Demographics of Council of Ministers ==
=== Parties ===
Party	Cabinet	MoS(I/C)	MoS	Total
BJP	19 (Note: Including Chief Minister of West Bengal)	3	19	41
Total	19	3	19	41

=== District ===
District	Number of Ministers	Name of Ministers	Constituency	Lok Sabha
Alipurduar	3	Manoj Kumar Oraon	Kumargram (ST)	Alipurduars (ST)
Alipurduar	3	Bishal Lama	Kalchini (ST)	Alipurduars (ST)
Alipurduar	3	Dipak Barman	Falakata (SC)	Alipurduars (ST)
Bankura	2	Kshudiram Tudu	Ranibandh (ST)	Bankura
Bankura	2	Dibakar Gharami	Sonamukhi (SC)	Bishnupur (SC)
Birbhum	2	Jagannath Chattopadhyay	Suri	Birbhum
Birbhum	2	Dudh Kumar Mondal	Mayureswar	Bolpur (SC)
Cooch Behar	2	Nisith Pramanik	Mathabhanga (SC)	Cooch Behar
Cooch Behar	2	Malati Rava Roy	Tufanganj	Alipurduars (ST)
Dakshin Dinajpur	—			
Darjeeling	2	Anandamoy Barman	Matigara-Naxalbari (SC)	Darjeeling
Darjeeling	2	Shankar Ghosh	Siliguri	Darjeeling
Hooghly	2	Bhaskar Bhattacharya	Sreerampur	Sreerampur
Hooghly	2	Sumana Sarkar	Balagarh (SC)	Hooghly
Howrah	1	Umesh Rai	Howrah Uttar	Howrah
Jalpaiguri	—			
Jhargram	2	Amiya Kisku	Nayagram (ST)	Jhargram (ST)
Jhargram	2	Rajesh Mahata	Gopiballavpur	Jhargram (ST)
Kalimpong	—			
Kolkata	4	Suvendu Adhikari	Bhabanipur	Kolkata Dakshin
Kolkata	4	Swapan Dasgupta	Rashbehari	Kolkata Dakshin
Kolkata	4	Purnima Chakraborty	Shyampukur	Kolkata Uttar
Kolkata	4	Tapas Roy	Maniktala	Kolkata Uttar
Malda	1	Joyel Murmu	Habibpur (ST)	Maldaha Uttar
Murshidabad	2	Gouri Shankar Ghosh	Murshidabad	Murshidabad
Murshidabad	2	Gargi Das Ghosh	Kandi	Baharampur
North 24 Parganas	4	Ashok Kirtania	Bangaon Uttar (SC)	Bangaon
North 24 Parganas	4	Arjun Singh	Noapara	Barrackpore
North 24 Parganas	4	Kalyan Chakraborty	Khardaha	Dum Dum
North 24 Parganas	4	Sharadwat Mukherjee	Bidhannagar	Barasat
Nadia	—			
Paschim Bardhaman	2	Agnimitra Paul	Asansol Dakshin	Asansol
Paschim Bardhaman	2	Ajay Kumar Poddar	Kulti	Asansol
Paschim Medinipur	1	Dilip Ghosh	Kharagpur Sadar	Medinipur
Purba Bardhaman	2	Moumita Biswas Mishra	Bardhaman Dakshin	Bardhaman–Durgapur
Purba Bardhaman	2	Kalita Maji	Ausgram (SC)	Bolpur (SC)
Purba Medinipur	4	Hare Krishna Bera	Tamluk	Tamluk
Purba Medinipur	4	Ashok Dinda	Moyna	Tamluk
Purba Medinipur	4	Shantanu Pramanik	Bhagabanpur	Kanthi
Purba Medinipur	4	Arup Kumar Das	Kanthi Dakshin	Kanthi
Purulia	1	Nadiar Chand Bouri	Para (SC)	Purulia
South 24 Parganas	2	Dipankar Jana	Kakdwip	Mathurapur
South 24 Parganas	2	Indranil Khan	Behala Paschim	Kolkata Dakshin
Uttar Dinajpur	2	Biraj Biswas	Karandighi	Raiganj
Uttar Dinajpur	2	Koushik Chowdhury	Raiganj	Raiganj
Total	41			

== See also ==
- Government of West Bengal
- West Bengal Legislative Assembly
- 2026 West Bengal Legislative Assembly election
