= 18th West Bengal Assembly =

Indian state assembly

←	17th Assembly	19th Assembly	→

Overview
- Legislative body: West Bengal Legislative Assembly
- Term: 15 May 2026 –
- Election: 2026
- Government: Adhikari ministry
- Opposition: DTC
- Members: 294
- Speaker of the House: Rathindra Bose
- Leader of the House: Suvendu Adhikari
- Leader of the Opposition: Ritabrata Banerjee
- Deputy Leaders of the Opposition: Javed Khan; Sandipan Saha; Sabina Yeasmin; Seuli Saha
- Party control: BJP

The Eighteenth Legislative Assembly of West Bengal constituted after the 2026 West Bengal Legislative Assembly elections which were concluded on 23 April & 29 April 2026 and the results announced on 4 May 2026.

== Outcome ==
=== Party- wise ===
Date	Rulling Party	Seats	Party in Opposition	Seats	Others
As of 4 May 2026	Bharatiya Janata Party	208	Trinamool Congress	80	6 (Note: AJUP - 2 INC- 2 CPI(M) - 1 ISF - 1)
As of 10 November 2026	Bharatiya Janata Party	209	Democratic Trinamool Congress	65	20 (Note: MAITC - 15 Indian National Congress - 2 AJUP - 1 CPI(M) - 1 ISF - 1)

=== Alliance- wise ===
Date	Rulling coalition	Seats	Alliance in opposition	Seats	Others
As of 4 May 2026	National Democratic Alliance	208	Trinamool Congress+	80	6 (Note: LF- 2 UPA- 2 AJUP+- 2)
As of 10 November 2026	National Democratic Alliance	209	Democratic Trinamool Congress+	65	20 (Note: TMC+- 15 LF- 2 UPA- 2 AJUP+- 1)

== Present members ==
=== Present party members ===
==== As of 4 May 2026 ====
#	Party	Seats
1	Bharatiya Janata Party	208
2	Trinamool Congress	80
3	Indian National Congress	2
4	Aam Janata Unnayan Party	2
5	Communist Party of India (Marxist)	1
6	All India Secular Front	1

==== As of 10 November 2026 ====
#	Party	Seats
1	Bharatiya Janata Party	209
2	Democratic Trinamool Congress	65
3	Mamata All India Trinamool Congress	15
4	Indian National Congress	2
5	Aam Janata Unnayan Party	1
6	Communist Party of India (Marxist)	1
7	All India Secular Front	1

== Office bearers ==
S.No	Position	Portrait	Name	Party	Constituency	Office Taken	Ref
1	Speaker		Rathindra Bose	BJP	Cooch Behar Dakshin	14 May 2026	
2	Leader of the House (Chief Minister)		Suvendu Adhikari	BJP	Bhabanipur	9 May 2026	
3	Government Chief Whip		Amlan Bhaduri	BJP	English Bazar	18 June 2026	
3	Leader of the Opposition		Ritabrata Banerjee	DTC	Uluberia Purba	3 June 2026	
4	Deputy Leaders of the Opposition		Javed Khan	DTC	Kasba	3 June 2026	
5	Deputy Leaders of the Opposition		Sandipan Saha	DTC	Entally	3 June 2026	
6	Deputy Leaders of the Opposition		Sabina Yeasmin	DTC	Sujapur	3 June 2026	
7	Deputy Leaders of the Opposition		Seuli Saha	DTC	Keshpur	3 June 2026	
8	Opposition Chief Whip		Akhruzzaman	DTC	Raghunathganj	3 June 2026	

== Members of Legislative Assembly ==
District	No.	Constituency	Name	Party	Remarks
Cooch Behar	1	Mekliganj (SC)	Dadhiram Ray	BJP	
Cooch Behar	2	Mathabhanga (SC)	Nisith Pramanik	BJP	Cabinet Minister
Cooch Behar	3	Cooch Behar Uttar	Sukumar Ray	BJP	
Cooch Behar	4	Cooch Behar Dakshin	Rathindra Bose	BJP	Speaker
Cooch Behar	5	Sitalkuchi (SC)	Sabitri Barman	BJP	
Cooch Behar	6	Sitai (SC)	Sangita Roy	MAITC	
Cooch Behar	7	Dinhata	Ajay Ray	BJP	
Cooch Behar	8	Natabari	Girija Shankar Ray	BJP	
Cooch Behar	9	Tufanganj	Malati Rava Roy	BJP	Minister of State (Independent Charge)
Alipurduar	10	Kumargram (ST)	Manoj Kumar Oraon	BJP	Cabinet Minister
Alipurduar	11	Kalchini (ST)	Bishal Lama	BJP	Minister of State
Alipurduar	12	Alipurduars	Paritosh Das	BJP	
Alipurduar	13	Falakata (SC)	Dipak Barman	BJP	Cabinet Minister
Alipurduar	14	Madarihat (ST)	Laxuman Limbu	BJP	
Jalpaiguri	15	Dhupguri (SC)	Naresh Roy	BJP	
Jalpaiguri	16	Maynaguri (SC)	Dalim Chandra Roy	BJP	
Jalpaiguri	17	Jalpaiguri (SC)	Ananta Deb Adhikari	BJP	
Jalpaiguri	18	Rajganj (SC)	Dinesh Sarkar	BJP	
Jalpaiguri	19	Dabgram-Phulbari	Shikha Chatterjee	BJP	
Jalpaiguri	20	Mal (ST)	Sukra Munda	BJP	
Jalpaiguri	21	Nagrakata	Puna Bhengra	BJP	
Kalimpong	22	Kalimpong	Bharat Chhetri	BJP	
Darjeeling	23	Darjeeling	Noman Rai	BJP	
Darjeeling	24	Kurseong	Sonam Lama	BJP	
Darjeeling	25	Matigara–Naxalbari (SC)	Anandamoy Barman	BJP	Minister of State
Darjeeling	26	Siliguri	Shankar Ghosh	BJP	Cabinet Minister
Darjeeling	27	Phansidewa (ST)	Durga Murmu	BJP	
Uttar Dinajpur	28	Chopra	Hamidul Rahaman	MAITC	
Uttar Dinajpur	29	Islampur	Kanaia Lal Agarwal	MAITC	
Uttar Dinajpur	30	Goalpokhar	Md. Ghulam Rabbani	MAITC	
Uttar Dinajpur	31	Chakulia	Minhajul Arfin Azad	MAITC	
Uttar Dinajpur	32	Karandighi	Biraj Biswas	BJP	Minister of State
Uttar Dinajpur	33	Hemtabad (SC)	Haripada Barman	BJP	
Uttar Dinajpur	34	Kaliaganj (SC)	Utpal Brahmacharo	BJP	
Uttar Dinajpur	35	Raiganj	Koushik Chowdhury	BJP	Minister of State
Uttar Dinajpur	36	Itahar	Mosaraf Hussen	MAITC	
Dakshin Dinajpur	37	Kushmandi (SC)	Tapas Chandra Roy	BJP	
Dakshin Dinajpur	38	Kumarganj	Toraf Hossain Mandal	DTC	
Dakshin Dinajpur	39	Balurghat	Bidyut Kumar Roy	BJP	
Dakshin Dinajpur	40	Tapan (ST)	Budhrai Tudu	BJP	
Dakshin Dinajpur	41	Gangarampur (SC)	Satyendra Nath Roy	BJP	
Dakshin Dinajpur	42	Harirampur	Biplab Mitra	DTC	
Malda	43	Habibpur (ST)	Joyel Murmu	BJP	Minister of State
Malda	44	Gazole (SC)	Chinmoy Deb Barman	BJP	
Malda	45	Chanchal	Prasun Banerjee	DTC	
Malda	46	Harishchandrapur	Md. Matibur Rahaman	DTC	
Malda	47	Malatipur	Abdur Rahim Boxi	DTC	
Malda	48	Ratua	Samar Mukherjee	DTC	
Malda	49	Manikchak	Gour Chandra Mandal	BJP	
Malda	50	Maldaha (SC)	Gopal Chandra Saha	BJP	
Malda	51	English Bazar	Amlan Bhaduri	BJP	
Malda	52	Mothabari	Md. Najrul Islam	DTC	
Malda	53	Sujapur	Sabina Yeasmin	DTC	
Malda	54	Baisnabnagar	Raju Karmakar	BJP	
Murshidabad	55	Farakka	Motab Shaikh	INC	
Murshidabad	56	Samserganj	Mohammad Noor Alam	DTC	
Murshidabad	57	Suti	Emani Biswas	DTC	
Murshidabad	58	Jangipur	Chitta Mukherjee	BJP	
Murshidabad	59	Raghunathganj	Akhruzzaman	DTC	
Murshidabad	60	Sagardighi	Bayron Biswas	DTC	
Murshidabad	61	Lalgola	Abdul Aziz	DTC	
Murshidabad	62	Bhagabangola	Reyat Hossain Sarkar	MAITC	
Murshidabad	63	Raninagar	Julfikar Ali	INC	
Murshidabad	64	Murshidabad	Gouri Shankar Ghosh	BJP	Cabinet Minister
Murshidabad	65	Nabagram (SC)	Dilip Saha	BJP	
Murshidabad	66	Khargram (SC)	Mitali Mal	BJP	
Murshidabad	67	Burwan (SC)	Sukhen Kumar Bagdi	BJP	
Murshidabad	68	Kandi	Gargi Das Ghosh	BJP	Minister of State
Murshidabad	69	Bharatpur	Mustafizur Rahaman	DTC	
Murshidabad	70	Rejinagar	Humayun Kabir	AJUP	Resigned on 15 May 2026
Murshidabad	70	Rejinagar	Shankharav Sarkar	BJP	Elected in 2026 by-election
Murshidabad	71	Beldanga	Bharat Kumar Jhawar	BJP	
Murshidabad	72	Baharampur	Subrata Maitra	BJP	
Murshidabad	73	Hariharpara	Niamot Sheikh	DTC	
Murshidabad	74	Naoda	Humayun Kabir	AJUP	
Murshidabad	75	Domkal	Md. Mostafijur Rahaman	CPI(M)	
Murshidabad	76	Jalangi	Babar Ali	DTC	
Nadia	77	Karimpur	Samarendranath Ghosh	BJP	
Nadia	78	Tehatta	Subrata Kabiraj	BJP	
Nadia	79	Palashipara	Rukbanur Rahman	DTC	
Nadia	80	Kaliganj	Alifa Ahmed	DTC	
Nadia	81	Nakashipara	Santanu Dey	BJP	
Nadia	82	Chapra	Jeber Sekh	DTC	
Nadia	83	Krishnanagar Uttar	Tarak Nath Chatterjee	BJP	
Nadia	84	Nabadwip	Srutisekhar Goswami	BJP	
Nadia	85	Krishnanagar Dakshin	Sadhan Ghosh	BJP	
Nadia	86	Santipur	Swapan Kumar Das	BJP	
Nadia	87	Ranaghat Uttar Paschim	Parthasarathi Chatterjee	BJP	
Nadia	88	Krishnaganj (SC)	Sukanta Biswas	BJP	
Nadia	89	Ranaghat Uttar Purba (SC)	Ashim Biswas	BJP	
Nadia	90	Ranaghat Dakshin (SC)	Ashis Kumar Biswas	BJP	
Nadia	91	Chakdaha	Bankim Chandra Ghosh	BJP	
Nadia	92	Kalyani (SC)	Anupam Biswas	BJP	
Nadia	93	Haringhata (SC)	Ashim Kumar Sarkar	BJP	
North 24 Parganas	94	Bagdah (SC)	Soma Thakur	BJP	
North 24 Parganas	95	Bangaon Uttar (SC)	Ashok Kirtania	BJP	Cabinet Minister
North 24 Parganas	96	Bangaon Dakshin (SC)	Swapan Majumder	BJP	
North 24 Parganas	97	Gaighata (SC)	Subrata Thakur	BJP	
North 24 Parganas	98	Swarupnagar (SC)	Bina Mondal	DTC	
North 24 Parganas	99	Baduria	Burhanul Mukaddim	DTC	
North 24 Parganas	100	Habra	Debdas Mondal	BJP	
North 24 Parganas	101	Ashoknagar	Sumay Hira	BJP	
North 24 Parganas	102	Amdanga	Mohammad Kasem Siddique	DTC	
North 24 Parganas	103	Bijpur	Sudipta Das	BJP	
North 24 Parganas	104	Naihati	Sumitro Chatterjee	BJP	
North 24 Parganas	105	Bhatpara	Pawan Kumar Singh	BJP	
North 24 Parganas	106	Jagatdal	Rajesh Kumar	BJP	
North 24 Parganas	107	Noapara	Arjun Singh	BJP	Cabinet Minister
North 24 Parganas	108	Barrackpore	Kaustuv Bagchi	BJP	
North 24 Parganas	109	Khardaha	Kalyan Chakraborty	BJP	Cabinet Minister
North 24 Parganas	110	Dum Dum Uttar	Sourav Sikdar	BJP	
North 24 Parganas	111	Panihati	Ratna Debnath	BJP	
North 24 Parganas	112	Kamarhati	Madan Mitra	DTC	
North 24 Parganas	113	Baranagar	Sajal Ghosh	BJP	
North 24 Parganas	114	Dum Dum	Arijit Bakshi	BJP	
North 24 Parganas	115	Rajarhat New Town	Piyush Kanodia	BJP	
North 24 Parganas	116	Bidhannagar	Sharadwat Mukhopadhyay	BJP	Cabinet Minister
North 24 Parganas	117	Rajarhat Gopalpur	Tarunjyoti Tewari	BJP	
North 24 Parganas	118	Madhyamgram	Rathin Ghosh	MAITC	
North 24 Parganas	119	Barasat	Sankar Chatterjee	BJP	
North 24 Parganas	120	Deganga	Anisur Rahaman Bidesh	MAITC	
North 24 Parganas	121	Haroa	Abdul Matin Muhammad	MAITC	
North 24 Parganas	122	Minakhan (SC)	Usha Rani Mondal	MAITC	
North 24 Parganas	123	Sandeshkhali (ST)	Sanat Sardar	BJP	
North 24 Parganas	124	Basirhat Dakshin	Surajit Mitra	DTC	
North 24 Parganas	125	Basirhat Uttar	Mohammad Tauseef Rahman	DTC	
North 24 Parganas	126	Hingalganj (SC)	Rekha Patra	BJP	
South 24 Parganas	127	Gosaba (SC)	Bikarna Naskar	BJP	
South 24 Parganas	128	Basanti (SC)	Nilima Mistry Bishal	DTC	
South 24 Parganas	129	Kultali (SC)	Ganesh Chandra Mondal	DTC	
South 24 Parganas	130	Patharpratima	Samir Kumar Jana	DTC	
South 24 Parganas	131	Kakdwip	Dipankar Jana	BJP	Minister of State
South 24 Parganas	132	Sagar	Sumanta Mandal	BJP	
South 24 Parganas	133	Kulpi	Barnali Dhara	DTC	
South 24 Parganas	134	Raidighi	Tapas Mondal	DTC	
South 24 Parganas	135	Mandirbazar (SC)	Joydeb Halder	DTC	
South 24 Parganas	136	Jaynagar (SC)	Biswanath Das	DTC	
South 24 Parganas	137	Baruipur Purba (SC)	Bivas Sardar	DTC	
South 24 Parganas	138	Canning Paschim (SC)	Paresh Ram Das	DTC	
South 24 Parganas	139	Canning Purba	Mohammad Baharul Islam	DTC	
South 24 Parganas	140	Baruipur Paschim	Biman Banerjee	DTC	
South 24 Parganas	141	Magrahat Purba (SC)	Sarmistha Purkait	DTC	
South 24 Parganas	142	Magrahat Paschim	Md. Samim Ahamed Molla	DTC	
South 24 Parganas	143	Diamond Harbour	Pannalal Halder	DTC	
South 24 Parganas	144	Falta	Debangshu Panda	BJP	
South 24 Parganas	145	Satgachia	Agniswar Naskar	BJP	
South 24 Parganas	146	Bishnupur (SC)	Dilip Mondal	DTC	
South 24 Parganas	147	Sonarpur Dakshin	Roopa Ganguly	BJP	
South 24 Parganas	148	Bhangar	Naushad Siddiqui	AISF	
South 24 Parganas	149	Kasba	Javed Ahmed Khan	DTC	Deputy Leader of Opposition
South 24 Parganas	150	Jadavpur	Sarbori Mukherjee	BJP	
South 24 Parganas	151	Sonarpur Uttar	Debasish Dhar	BJP	
South 24 Parganas	152	Tollygunge	Papiya Adhikari	BJP	
South 24 Parganas	153	Behala Purba	Sankar Sikder	BJP	
South 24 Parganas	154	Behala Paschim	Indranil Khan	BJP	Minister of State (Independent Charge)
South 24 Parganas	155	Maheshtala	Subhasis Das	DTC	
South 24 Parganas	156	Budge Budge	Ashok Kumar Deb	DTC	
South 24 Parganas	157	Metiaburuz	Abdul Khaleque Molla	DTC	
Kolkata	158	Kolkata Port	Firhad Hakim	DTC	
Kolkata	159	Bhabanipur	Suvendu Adhikari	BJP	Chief Minister
Kolkata	160	Rashbehari	Swapan Dasgupta	BJP	Cabinet Minister
Kolkata	161	Ballygunge	Sovandeb Chattopadhyay	MAITC	
Kolkata	162	Chowrangee	Nayna Bandyopadhyay	MAITC	
Kolkata	163	Entally	Sandipan Saha	DTC	Deputy Leader of Opposition
Kolkata	164	Beleghata	Kunal Ghosh	MAITC	
Kolkata	165	Jorasanko	Vijay Ojha	BJP	
Kolkata	166	Shyampukur	Purnima Chakraborty	BJP	Minister of State
Kolkata	167	Maniktala	Tapas Roy	BJP	Cabinet Minister
Kolkata	168	Kashipur–Belgachhia	Ritesh Tiwari	BJP	
Howrah	169	Bally	Sanjay Kumar Singh	BJP	
Howrah	170	Howrah Uttar	Umesh Rai	BJP	Minister of State
Howrah	171	Howrah Madhya	Arup Roy	DTC	
Howrah	172	Shibpur	Rudranil Ghosh	BJP	
Howrah	173	Howrah Dakshin	Nandita Chowdhury	DTC	
Howrah	174	Sankrail (SC)	Priya Paul	DTC	
Howrah	175	Panchla	Gulshan Mullick	DTC	
Howrah	176	Uluberia Purba	Ritabrata Banerjee	DTC	Leader of the Opposition
Howrah	177	Uluberia Uttar (SC)	Chiran Bera	BJP	
Howrah	178	Uluberia Dakshin	Pulak Roy	DTC	
Howrah	179	Shyampur	Hiran Chatterjee	BJP	
Howrah	180	Bagnan	Arunava Sen	DTC	
Howrah	181	Amta	Amit Samanta	BJP	
Howrah	182	Udaynarayanpur	Samir Kumar Panja	DTC	
Howrah	183	Jagatballavpur	Anupam Ghosh	BJP	
Howrah	184	Domjur	Tapas Maity	DTC	
Hooghly	185	Uttarpara	Dipanjan Chakraborty	BJP	
Hooghly	186	Sreerampur	Bhaskar Bhattacharya	BJP	Minister of State
Hooghly	187	Champdani	Dilip Singh	BJP	
Hooghly	188	Singur	Arup Kumar Das	BJP	
Hooghly	189	Chandannagar	Deepanjan Kumar Guha	BJP	
Hooghly	190	Chunchura	Subir Nag	BJP	
Hooghly	191	Balagarh (SC)	Sumana Sarkar	BJP	Minister of State
Hooghly	192	Pandua	Tushar Kumar Majumdar	BJP	
Hooghly	193	Saptagram	Swaraj Ghosh	BJP	
Hooghly	194	Chanditala	Swati Khandoker	DTC	
Hooghly	195	Jangipara	Prosenjit Bag	BJP	
Hooghly	196	Haripal	Madhumita Ghosh	BJP	
Hooghly	197	Dhanekhali (SC)	Ashima Patra	MAITC	
Hooghly	198	Tarakeswar	Santu Pan	BJP	
Hooghly	199	Pursurah	Biman Ghosh	BJP	
Hooghly	200	Arambagh (SC)	Hemanta Bag	BJP	
Hooghly	201	Goghat (SC)	Prasanta Digar	BJP	
Hooghly	202	Khanakul	Susanta Ghosh	BJP	
Purba Medinipur	203	Tamluk	Hare Krishna Bera	BJP	Minister of State
Purba Medinipur	204	Panskura Purba	Subrata Maity	BJP	
Purba Medinipur	205	Panskura Paschim	Sintu Senapati	BJP	
Purba Medinipur	206	Moyna	Ashok Dinda	BJP	Minister of State
Purba Medinipur	207	Nandakumar	Nirmal Khanra	BJP	
Purba Medinipur	208	Mahisadal	Subhas Chandra Panja	BJP	
Purba Medinipur	209	Haldia (SC)	Pradip Kumar Bijali	BJP	
Purba Medinipur	210	Nandigram	Suvendu Adhikari	BJP	Chief Minister; Resigned on 13 May 2026
Purba Medinipur	210	Nandigram	Hasirani Rath	BJP	Elected through 2026 bypoll
Purba Medinipur	211	Chandipur	Pijush Kanti Das	BJP	
Purba Medinipur	212	Patashpur	Tapan Maity	BJP	
Purba Medinipur	213	Kanthi Uttar	Sumita Sinha	BJP	
Purba Medinipur	214	Bhagabanpur	Shantanu Pramanik	BJP	Minister of State
Purba Medinipur	215	Khejuri (SC)	Subrata Paik	BJP	
Purba Medinipur	216	Kanthi Dakshin	Arup Kumar Das	BJP	Cabinet Minister
Purba Medinipur	217	Ramnagar	Chandra Shekhar Mondal	BJP	
Purba Medinipur	218	Egra	Dibyendu Adhikari	BJP	
Paschim Medinipur	219	Dantan	Ajit Kumar Jana	BJP	
Jhargram	220	Nayagram (ST)	Amiya Kisku	BJP	Minister of State
Jhargram	221	Gopiballavpur	Rajesh Mahata	BJP	Minister of State (Independent Charge)
Jhargram	222	Jhargram	Lakshmikanta Sau	BJP	
Paschim Medinipur	223	Keshiary (ST)	Bhadra Hemram	BJP	
Paschim Medinipur	224	Kharagpur Sadar	Dilip Ghosh	BJP	Cabinet Minister
Paschim Medinipur	225	Narayangarh	Rama Prasad Giri	BJP	
Paschim Medinipur	226	Sabang	Amal Kumar Panda	BJP	
Paschim Medinipur	227	Pingla	Swagata Manna	BJP	
Paschim Medinipur	228	Kharagpur	Dinen Roy	DTC	
Paschim Medinipur	229	Debra	Subhasish Om	BJP	
Paschim Medinipur	230	Daspur	Tapan Kumar Dutta	BJP	
Paschim Medinipur	231	Ghatal (SC)	Shital Kapat	BJP	
Paschim Medinipur	232	Chandrakona (SC)	Sukanta Dolui	BJP	
Paschim Medinipur	233	Garbeta	Pradip Lodha	BJP	
Paschim Medinipur	234	Salboni	Biman Mahata	BJP	
Paschim Medinipur	235	Keshpur (SC)	Seuli Saha	DTC	
Paschim Medinipur	236	Medinipur	Sankar Guchhait	BJP	
Jhargram	237	Binpur	Pranat Tudu	BJP	
Purulia	238	Bandwan (ST)	Labsen Baskey	BJP	
Purulia	239	Balarampur	Jaladhar Mahato	BJP	
Purulia	240	Baghmundi	Rahidas Mahato	BJP	
Purulia	241	Joypur	Biswajit Mahato	BJP	
Purulia	242	Purulia	Sudip Kumar Mukherjee	BJP	
Purulia	243	Manbazar (ST)	Mayna Murmu	BJP	
Purulia	244	Kashipur	Kamalakanta Hansda	BJP	
Purulia	245	Para (SC)	Nadiar Chand Bouri	BJP	Minister of State
Purulia	246	Raghunathpur (SC)	Mamoni Bauri	BJP	
Bankura	247	Saltora (SC)	Chandana Bauri	BJP	
Bankura	248	Chhatna	Satyanarayan Mukhopadhyay	BJP	
Bankura	249	Ranibandh (ST)	Kshudiram Tudu	BJP	Cabinet Minister
Bankura	250	Raipur (ST)	Kshetra Mohan Hansda	BJP	
Bankura	251	Taldangra	Souvik Patra	BJP	
Bankura	252	Bankura	Niladri Sekhar Dana	BJP	
Bankura	253	Barjora	Billeshwar Sinha	BJP	
Bankura	254	Onda	Amarnath Shakha	BJP	
Bankura	255	Bishnupur	Shukla Chatterjee	BJP	
Bankura	256	Katulpur (SC)	Lakshmikanta Majumdar	BJP	
Bankura	257	Indas (SC)	Nirmal Kumar Dhara	BJP	
Bankura	258	Sonamukhi (SC)	Dibakar Gharami	BJP	Minister of State
Purba Bardhaman	259	Khandaghosh (SC)	Nabin Chandra Bag	DTC	
Purba Bardhaman	260	Bardhaman Dakshin	Moumita Biswas Mishra	BJP	Minister of State
Purba Bardhaman	261	Raina (SC)	Souvik Patra	BJP	
Purba Bardhaman	262	Jamalpur (SC)	Arun Halder	BJP	
Purba Bardhaman	263	Monteswar	Saikat Panja	BJP	
Purba Bardhaman	264	Kalna	Siddharth Majumdar	BJP	
Purba Bardhaman	265	Memari	Manab Guha	BJP	
Purba Bardhaman	266	Bardhaman Uttar (SC)	Nisith Kumar Malik	DTC	
Purba Bardhaman	267	Bhatar	Soumen Karfa	BJP	
Purba Bardhaman	268	Purbasthali Dakshin	Prankrishna Tapadar	BJP	
Purba Bardhaman	269	Purbasthali Uttar	Gopal Chattopadhyay	BJP	
Purba Bardhaman	270	Katwa	Krishna Ghosh	BJP	
Purba Bardhaman	271	Ketugram	Anadi Ghosh	BJP	
Purba Bardhaman	272	Mangalkot	Shishir Ghosh	BJP	
Purba Bardhaman	273	Ausgram (SC)	Kalita Maji	BJP	Minister of State
Purba Bardhaman	274	Galsi (SC)	Raju Patra	BJP	
Paschim Bardhaman	275	Pandabeswar	Jitendra Tiwari	BJP	
Paschim Bardhaman	276	Durgapur Purba	Chandra Shekhar Banerjee	BJP	
Paschim Bardhaman	277	Durgapur Paschim	Lakshman Chandra Ghorui	BJP	
Paschim Bardhaman	278	Raniganj	Partho Ghosh	BJP	
Paschim Bardhaman	279	Jamuria	Bijan Mukherjee	BJP	
Paschim Bardhaman	280	Asansol Dakshin	Agnimitra Paul	BJP	Cabinet Minister
Paschim Bardhaman	281	Asansol Uttar	Krishnendu Mukherjee	BJP	
Paschim Bardhaman	282	Kulti	Ajay Kumar Poddar	BJP	Cabinet Minister
Paschim Bardhaman	283	Barabani	Arijit Roy	BJP	
Birbhum	284	Dubrajpur (SC)	Anup Kumar Saha	BJP	
Birbhum	285	Suri	Jagannath Chattopadhyay	BJP	Cabinet Minister
Birbhum	286	Bolpur	Chandranath Sinha	DTC	
Birbhum	287	Nanoor (SC)	Bidhan Chandra Majhi	DTC	
Birbhum	288	Labhpur	Debasis Ojha	BJP	
Birbhum	289	Sainthia (SC)	Krishna Kanta Saha	BJP	
Birbhum	290	Mayureswar	Dudh Kumar Mondal	BJP	Cabinet Minister
Birbhum	291	Rampurhat	Dhruba Saha	BJP	
Birbhum	292	Hansan	Fayezul Haque	DTC	
Birbhum	293	Nalhati	Rajendra Prasad Singh	DTC	
Birbhum	294	Murarai	Mosarraf Hossain	DTC	

== Re-elections ==
Date	Constituency		Winning candidate	Party	Losing candidate	Party
21 May 2026	144	Falta	Debangsu Panda	BJP	Sambhu Nath Kurmi	CPI(M)
Re- elections in the Falta Assembly constituency was necessited following the voting irregularities during the actual voting day.

== By-elections ==
Date	Constituency		Winning Candidate	Party	Losing candidate	Party
6 October 2026	70	Rejinagar	Sakharav Sarkar	BJP	Golam Nabi Azad (Robin)	AJUP
By- elections in the Rejinagar Assembly constituency was necessited following the resignation of sitting MLA Humayun Kabir on 15 May 2026.
6 October 2026	210	Nandigram	Hasirani Rath	BJP	Milan Pradhan	INC
6 October 2026	210	Nandigram	By- elections in Nandigram Assembly constituency was necessited following the resignation of sitting MLA Suvendu Adhikari on 13 May 2026.			

== See also ==
- West Bengal Legislative Assembly
- 2026 West Bengal Legislative Assembly Elections
- West Bengal
- Suvendu Adhikari
