= KTV Bangla =

Indian 23 schedule language TV channel

KTV বাংলা earlier known as Tribe TV
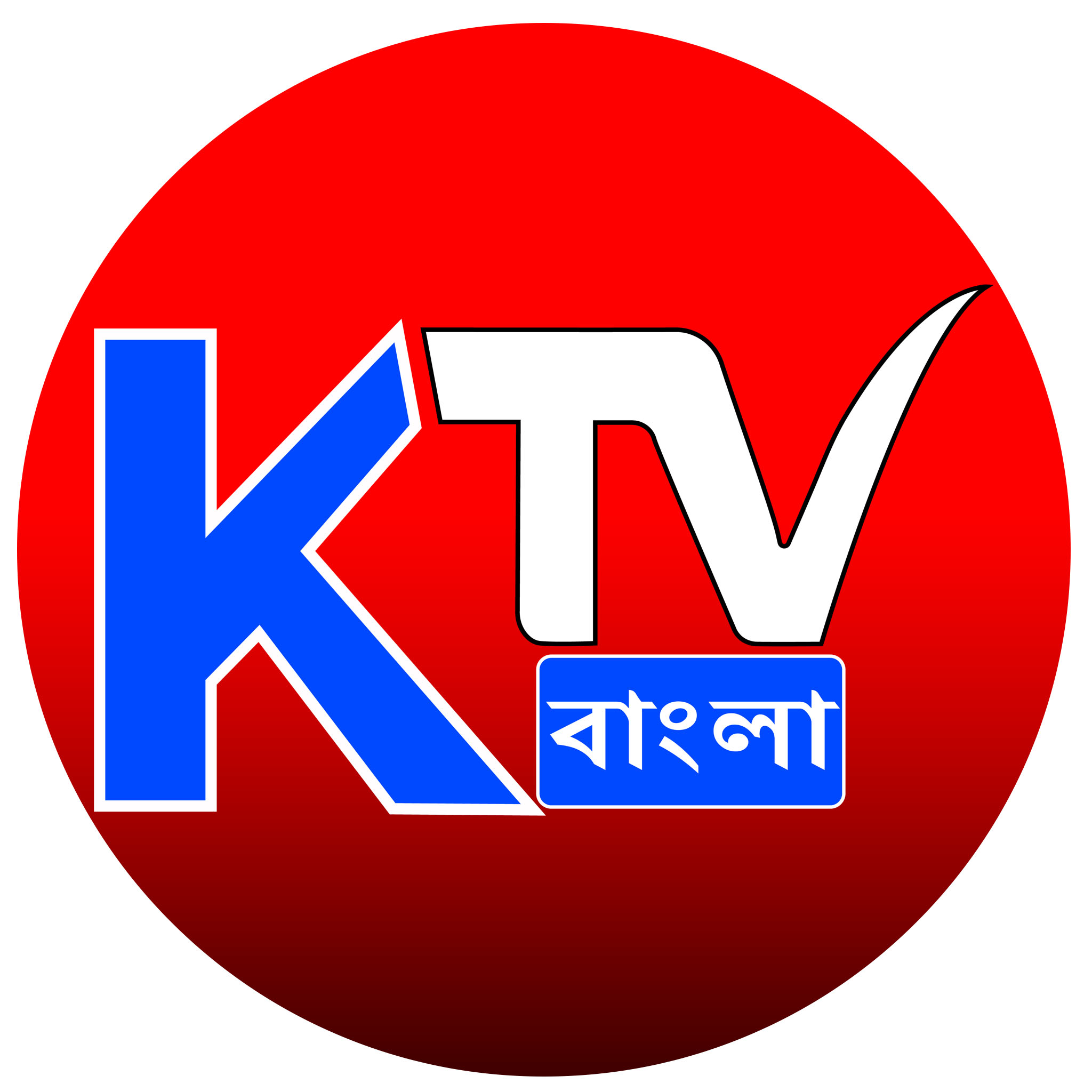
- Type: Broadcast television network
- Country: India
- Broadcast area: PAN India
- Headquarters: Raiganj, West Bengal

Programming
- Language: Bengali
- Picture format: 4:3 (576i, SDTV)

Ownership
- Owner: Kalyani Solvex Private Limited

History
- Launched: 9 August 2021; 4 years ago
- Founder: Krishna Kalyani

Links
- Website: http://ktvbangla.com

KTV Bangla (KTV বাংলা) (formerly Tribe TV) is an Indian television channel broadcast in the Bengali language. The channel is the first satellite channel owned by Kalyani Solvex Private Limited and the channel's co-founder is Raiganj Vidhan Sabha constituency's MLA Krishna Kalyani.

== History ==
In 2020, Kalyani Solvex Private Limited established the channel at Raiganj, West Bengal. The channel broadcasts daily news bulletins, including world news, live from Delhi.

The channel was launched on 9 August 2021 through various satellite and cable platforms. The channel has a wide range of diverse programming, which includes drama and news.

== Shows ==
- Good Morning Bengal গুডমর্নিং বেঙ্গল
- Khabar Saradin খবর সারাদিন
- Jelar khabor জেলার খবর
- Bengal Today বেঙ্গল টুডে
- Bengal X-press বেঙ্গল এক্সপ্রেস
- News at 9 (Santali)
- Uttorer Udan _ Dakshner Darpan উত্তরের উড়ান _ দক্ষিণের দর্পন
- Weekly Special Show সাপ্তহিক বিশেষ
- Sobdo Katakati শব্দ কাটাকাটি
- Ingit ইঙ্গিত
- Pothe Panchali পথে পাঁচালী
- Rasona Asan রসনা আসান
- Cinema Safor সিনেমা সফর
- Dutor Dunia দুটোর দুনিয়া
- Deshe Bideshe দেশে বিদেশে
- Metro Junction মেট্রো জংশন

== Satellite ==
Tribe TV channel started on GSAT-17/ GSAT-17 at 93.5 East.

- Channel name: TRIBE TV
- Frequency: 4175.5
- Popularization: H
- Symbol Rate: 13.6
- Video Pid: 8025
- Audio Pid: Default MPEG PID 8026 Hin
- Service Id: 16
- Satellite Position: GSAT 17 – Gsat 17

== MSO PARTNERS (Tribe TV is available to watch) ==
- SITI CABLE # 84
- KCBPL GTPL # 69
- MEGHBELA # 277
- DIGICABLE # 41
- MRMPL # 53
- BHORER ALO # 53
- CCN # 53
- DIGICAST NETWORK # 871
- BRT DIGITAL # 916

== See also ==
- Lists of television channels in India
- India TV
- Zee News
