= Chakradhar Meikap =

Minister of State (Independent Charge), Government of West Bengal
- In office 2006–2011
- Department: Technical Education
- Preceded by: Mohammed Salim
- Succeeded by: Purnendu Basu

Member of the West Bengal Legislative Assembly
- In office 2006–2011
- Preceded by: Jyotirmoy Kar
- Succeeded by: Banasri Maity
- Constituency: Contai North

Personal details
- Party: CPIM
- Education: Calcutta University
- Profession: Politician

Chakradhar Meikap is an Indian politician from West Bengal. He was elected as a Member of the Legislative Assembly in 2006 West Bengal Legislative Assembly election from Contai North, as a member of the CPIM. He served as a minister of state (I/C) of Technical Education in Third Bhattacharjee ministry
