= Desher Barta =

Indian Bengali-language TV channel

- Headquarters: Raiganj, West Bengal

Programming
- Language: Bengali

Ownership
- Owner: Nearbymade International Private Limited

History
- Launched: 12 July 2019; 6 years ago
- Founder: Dwip Narayan Chakraborty

Desher Barta ( in English Country News) is a Bengali regional Television channel owned by Nearbymade International private limited. The Channel was launched in 2019 and broadcast from Raiganj, West Bengal. covering agriculture and rural development episodes and educational programs.

== History ==
In 2019 the channel started broadcasting through IPTV. In 2020 the channel fully digitalized and joined with a few TRAI-listed Multiple system operator for large-scale distribution.

== Popular shows ==
Matir Kotha ( Agriculture and Rural development related show).

Bigganer Duniya ( Science education related show).

Surer Aaksh ( Entertainment related show).

== Sister concerns ==
- Desher Barta Digital (Mobile app)

== See also ==
- List of Bengali-language television channels in India
- High News
- Tribe TV
