= Abhijit Roy =

Abhijit Roy may refer to:

- Abhijit Roy (cricketer)
- Abhijit Roy (politician)

== See also ==
- Avijit Roy, Bangladeshi-American engineer and online activist
