= Department of Agriculture (West Bengal) =

Bengal government ministry

Agency overview
- Jurisdiction: Government of West Bengal
- Headquarters: Nabanna
- Minister responsible: Dudh Kumar Mondal, Cabinet Minister
- Website: matirkatha.wb.gov.in

The Department of Agriculture is the specific arm of the Government of West Bengal working to improve agriculture, develop export opportunities for agri produce and look after the welfare of farmers.

== Works ==
It takes policy decisions on agricultural production and productivity, and by extension, on technology generation, ensuring availability and timely distribution of agriculture inputs specially seeds, fertilisers, subsidy, credit etc. Support service is provided through soil testing, soil and water conservation, seed testing and certification, plan production, quality control of fertilisers and pesticides, etc. Main stake holders for the Department are--(i) Farmers (ii) Government (iii) Manufacturer, dealers and retailers of Fertiliser, Seed and Pesticide (iv) Citizens in General.

== See also ==
- Regional Research Station
