= Department of Information & Cultural Affairs (West Bengal) =

Indian state government ministry

Department overview
- Jurisdiction: Government of West Bengal
- Headquarters: Writers' Building, Kolkata
- Minister responsible: Suvendu Adhikari
- Deputy Minister responsible: Purnima Chakraborty, MoS
- Website: icad.wb.gov.in

The Department of Information & Cultural Affairs of West Bengal, previously known as the Department of Information & Public Relations, is a Bengal government ministry. It is a nodal ministry mainly responsible for the information, culture, film and archaeological heritage-related activities of the State. The principal objectives of the department are to disseminate information about the activities & achievements of the state government through the media, keep the ministers & other senior government functionaries aware of the public reaction reflected through the media & other sources, promote & preserve Bengali cultural heritage (including the folk culture), preserve West Bengal's archaeological heritage, coordinate with important personalities, and facilitate all activities related to films, theatre, art, etc., organize state ceremonies, and extend hospitality to visiting Indian and foreign dignitaries.

== Ministerial team ==
The ministerial team is headed by the Cabinet Minister for Information & Cultural Affairs, who may or may not be supported by Ministers of State. Civil servants are assigned to them to manage the ministers' office and ministry.

The current Minister in Suvendu Adhikari ministry is Chief Minister himself formed on 09 May 2026. Minister of State is Purnima Chakraborty.

== Directorates ==
- Information
- Culture
- Archaeology and Museums
- Films
- Basumati Corporation Limited

== Information Directorate ==
The Information Directorate is entrusted with the responsibility of disseminating information of public importance, maintaining public relation, generating public awareness about different issues of great significance, propagating policy and programmes of the Government, ventilating news and views of the State Government, co-coordinating media related issues, releasing advertisements on behalf of the State Government through its various offices in Kolkata, Delhi, Siliguri and other offices stretching from sub-divisions to district level and also gather information about the socio-economic and cultural situation and public opinion of the society from grass root level. It has a State hospitality wing which facilitates guests and dignitaries during their visit in the State. It organizes the State ceremonies as well as birth and death anniversaries of many notable persons.

== Culture Directorate ==
The Directorate of Culture regularly organizes festivals and events on various genres such as music, literature, theatre, fine arts, and dance. It promotes the wide-ranging folk varieties of the state. It focuses on nurturing new talents, providing a platform to artistes and organizations, and ensuring assistance to artistes who are elderly or belong to the financially weaker strata. A number of academies and institutes operate under the Directorate to ensure promotion of languages spoken in the state and representation to all sections of the society.

== Archaeology and Museums Directorate ==
The Directorate of Archaeology and Museums has been looking after ancient and historical monuments as well as conducts excavation works regularly to unearth archaeological sites and remains by itself or by encouraging educational institutions of repute to explore these objectives. Apart from State Archaeological Museum in Kolkata, this Directorate has six District level museums where invaluable antiquities are well preserved and displayed to the public. This Directorate publishes books regularly and has had its own publication named “Purabritya”. The Centre for Archaeological Studies & Training and West Bengal Heritage Commission also comes under the directorate.

== Film Directorate ==
The major activities and initiatives of the Directorate includes the organization of the Kolkata International Film Festival, provision of filming facilities at the West Bengal Tele Academy in Baruipur, commercial screening of Bengali films at subsidized rates at Nandan and Radha Studio, offering a two-year diploma course in filmmaking at Roopkala Kendra, digitization and restoration of cinematographic films preserved in the State Government-owned film vaults at the Cinema Centenary Building and Rupayan, and facilitating film and television shooting activities at the Technicians' Studio.

The directorate also administers the Film Workers' Welfare Fund for distinguished cine worker and provides medical insurance coverage for cine artists, technicians, and their family members.
