= Kanthi Uttar Assembly constituency =

Kanthi Uttar
- Constituency No. 213 for the West Bengal Legislative Assembly
- Interactive Map Outlining Kanthi Uttar Assembly Constituency

Constituency details
- Country: India
- Region: East India
- State: West Bengal
- District: Purba Medinipur
- Lok Sabha constituency: Kanthi
- Established: 1951
- Total electors: 2,57,427
- Reservation: None

Member of Legislative Assembly
- 18th West Bengal Legislative Assembly
- Incumbent Sumita Sinha
- Party: BJP
- Alliance: NDA
- Elected year: 2026

Kanthi Uttar Assembly constituency is an assembly constituency in Purba Medinipur district in the Indian state of West Bengal.

== Overview ==
As per orders of the Delimitation Commission, No. 213 Kanthi Uttar Assembly constituency is composed of the following: Deshapran CD Block, Brajachauli, Debendra, Kanaidighi, Kumirda, Lauda and Marishda gram panchayats of Contai III and Bathuari gram panchayat of Egra II community development block.

Kanthi Uttar Assembly constituency is part of No. 31 Kanthi (Lok Sabha constituency).

== Members of the Legislative Assembly ==
Year	Name	Party
1952	Sudhir Chandra Das	Kisan Mazdoor Praja Party
1957	Natendra Nath Das	Praja Socialist Party
1962	Bejoy Krishna Maity	Indian National Congress
1967	L Das	Indian National Congress
1969	Subodh Gopal Guchhait	Praja Socialist Party
1971	Anil Kumar Manna	Praja Socialist Party
1972	Kamakshyanandan Das Mahapatra	Communist Party of India
1977	Rashbehari Pal	Janata Party
1982	Mukul Bikash Maity	Indian National Congress
1987	Ram Shankar Kar	Communist Party of India
1991	Mukul Bikash Maity	Indian National Congress
1996	Chakradhar Meikap	Communist Party of India
2001	Jyotirmoy Kar	All India Trinamool Congress
2006	Chakradhar Meikap	Communist Party of India
2011	Banasri Maity	All India Trinamool Congress
2016	Banasri Maity	All India Trinamool Congress
2021	Sumita Sinha	Bharatiya Janata Party
2026	Sumita Sinha	Bharatiya Janata Party

== Election results ==
=== 2026 ===
2026 West Bengal Legislative Assembly election: Kanthi Uttar
Party	Candidate	Votes	%	±%
BJP	Sumita Sinha	130,088	52.16	+2.46
AITC	Debasis Bhunya	110,033	44.12	−1.5
CPI(M)	Sutanu Maity	4,645	1.86	−0.99
NOTA	None of the above	1,467	0.59	−0.06
Majority		20,055	8.04	+3.96
Turnout		249,421	94.52	+5.79
BJP hold		Swing		

=== 2021 ===
West Bengal Legislative Assembly Election, 2021: Kanthi Uttar
Party	Candidate	Votes	%	±%
BJP	Sumita Sinha	113,524	49.70	
AITC	Tarun Kumar Jana	104,194	45.62	
CPI(M)	Sutanu Maity	6,504	2.85	
NOTA	None of the above	1,492	0.65	
Majority		9,330	4.08	
Turnout		228,416	88.73	
BJP gain from AITC		Swing		

=== 2016 ===
West Bengal Legislative Assembly Election, 2016: Kanthi Uttar
Party	Candidate	Votes	%	±%
AITC	Banasri Maity	100,378		
CPI(M)	Chakradhar Maikap	85,207		
NOTA	None of the above			
Majority		18,576		
Turnout				
AITC hold		Swing		

=== 2011 ===
West Bengal assembly elections, 2011: Kanthi Uttar
Party	Candidate	Votes	%	±%
AITC	Banasri Maity	91,528	49.78	−0.55
CPI(M)	Chakradhar Meikap	83,573	45.45	−2.85
BJP	Gour Hari Jana	5,859	3.19	
JD(U)	Bhaskar Mahakur	1,518		
Independent	Biswajit Choudhury	1,400		
Turnout		183,878	91.04	
AITC gain from CPI(M)		Swing	2.30	

.# Swing calculated on Congress+Trinamool Congress vote percentages taken together in 2006.

=== 2006 ===
In the 2006 state assembly elections, Chakradhar Meikap of CPI(M) won the Contai North assembly seat defeating his nearest rival Jyotirmoy Kar of Trinamool Congress. Contests in most years were multi cornered but only winners and runners are being mentioned. Jyotirmoy Kar of Trinamool Congress defeated Chakradhar Maikap of CPI(M) in 2001. Chakradhar Maikap of CPI(M) defeated Mukul Bikash Maiti of Congress in 1996. Mukul Bikash Maity of Congress defeated Anil Kumar Manna of Janata Dal in 1991. Ram Sankar Kar of CPI(M) defeated Dwijendra Maiti of Congress in 1987. Mukul Bikash Maity of Congress defeated Anurup Panda of CPI(M) in 1982. Rashbehari Pal of Janata Party defeated Sailaja Das of Congress in 1977.

=== 1972 ===
Kamakshyanandan Das Mohapatra of CPI won in 1972. Anil Kumar Manna of PSP won in 1971. Subodh Gopal Guchhati of PSP won in 1969. L.Das of Congress won in 1967. Bejoy Krishna Maity of Congress won in 1962. Natendra Nath Das of PSP won in 1957. In independent India's first election in 1951 Sudhir Chandra Das of KMPP won the Contai North seat.
