= Nadiar Chand Bouri =

Indian politician

Minister of State, Government of West Bengal
- Incumbent
- Assumed office 1 June 2026
- Governor: R. N. Ravi
- Chief Minister: Suvendu Adhikari

Member of the West Bengal Legislative Assembly
- Incumbent
- Assumed office 2 May 2021
- Preceded by: Umapada Bauri
- Constituency: Para

Personal details
- Party: Bharatiya Janata Party

Nadiar Chand Bouri (Bengali: নদীয়ারচাঁদ বাউড়ি ; Hindi: नदीयारचाँद बाउड़ि) is an Indian politician from Bharatiya Janata Party. In May 2021, he was elected as a member of the West Bengal Legislative Assembly from Para (constituency). He defeated Umapada Bauri of All India Trinamool Congress by 3,944 votes in 2021 West Bengal Assembly election.

== Electoral performance ==
West Bengal Legislative Assembly
Year	Constituency	Party	Votes	%	Opponent	Party	Votes	%	Margin	Result
2021	Para	BJP	87,347	45.02	Umapada Bauri	AITC	83,340	42.95	4,007	Won
2026	Para	BJP	113,488	52.55	Manik Chandra Bauri	AITC	79,767	36.94	33,721	Won

== See also ==
- 2026 West Bengal Legislative Assembly election
- List of chief ministers of West Bengal
- West Bengal Legislative Assembly
- 18th West Bengal Assembly
