= Dudh Kumar Mondal =

Indian politician

Minister for Agriculture in Government of West Bengal
- Incumbent
- Assumed office 1 June 2026
- Governor: R. N. Ravi
- Chief Minister: Suvendu Adhikari

Member of the West Bengal Legislative Assembly
- Incumbent
- Assumed office 4 May 2026
- Preceded by: Abhijit Roy
- Constituency: Mayureswar

Personal details
- Party: Bharatiya Janata Party
- Profession: Politician

Dudh Kumar Mondal is an Indian politician from West Bengal. He is a member of the West Bengal Legislative Assembly representing Mayureswar as a member of the Bharatiya Janata Party. He is currently serving as the Agriculture Minister of West Bengal.

== Political career ==
Mondal won the Mayureswar seat in the 2026 West Bengal Legislative Assembly election as a candidate of the Bharatiya Janata Party. He received 1,07,056 votes and defeats Abhijit Roy of the All India Trinamool Congress by a margin of 21,002 votes.

On 1 June 2026, he was sworn in as a Cabinet Minister of West Bengal, along with twelve other members.

== Electoral performance ==
West Bengal Legislative Assembly
Year	Constituency	Party	Votes	%	Opponent	Party	Votes	%	Margin	Result
2011	Mayureswar	BJP	31,031	19.46	Ashok Ray	CPI(M)	67,478	42.31	36,447	Lost
2026	Mayureswar	BJP	1,07,056	50.15	Abhijit Roy	AITC	86,054	40.31	21,002	Won

== See also ==
- 2026 West Bengal Legislative Assembly election
- List of chief ministers of West Bengal
- West Bengal Legislative Assembly
- 18th West Bengal Assembly
