= Kanutia =

- Village
- Location in West Bengal, India
- Coordinates: 23°59′40.16″N 87°50′25.95″E
- Country: India
- State: West Bengal
- District: Birbhum
- Subdivision: Rampurhat
- Block: Mayureswar II

Government
  - Type: Kaleswar Gram Panchayat(কলেশ্বর গ্রাম পঞ্চায়েত)
  - MLA: Abhijit Roy(TMC)
  - MP: Asit Kumar Mal(TMC)

Languages
  - Official: Bengali, English
- Time zone: UTC+5:30 (IST)
- PIN: 731213
- Telephone code: 91 3462
- Lok Sabha constituency: Bolpur
- Vidhan Sabha constituency: Mayureswar
- Website: birbhum.nic.in

Kanutia is a village in Mayureswar II block of Birbhum District in the Indian state of West Bengal.
