= Hare Krishna Bera =

Indian politician (born 1960)

Dr. Hare Krishna Bera

Minister of State, Government of West Bengal
- Incumbent
- Assumed office 1 June 2026
- Governor: R. N. Ravi
- Chief Minister: Suvendu Adhikari
- Departments: Higher Education; Technical Education
- Cabinet Minister: Jagannath Chattopadhyay

Member of the West Bengal Legislative Assembly
- Incumbent
- Assumed office 9 May 2026
- Preceded by: Soumen Kumar Mahapatra
- Constituency: Tamluk

Personal details
- Born: July 31, 1960 (age 66) Tamluk, Purba Medinipur, West Bengal, India
- Party: Bharatiya Janata Party
- Education: University of Calcutta (MD); Calcutta National Medical College (MBBS)
- Occupation: Doctor, Politician

Dr. Hare Krishna Bera (born 31 July 1960) is an Indian politician from West Bengal. He is a member of West Bengal Legislative Assembly from Tamluk Assembly constituency in Purba Medinipur district representing the Bharatiya Janata Party.

== Early life ==
Bera is from Tamluk, West Bengal. He is the son of the late Kumed Chandra Bera. He completed his MBBS in the year 1985 from Calcutta National Medical College and his MD (General Medicine) in 1992 from University of Calcutta. His wife is a retired state government employment. He is a physician and declared assets worth ₹7 crore in his affidavit to the Election Commission of India.

== Career ==
Bera won the Tamluk Assembly constituency representing the Bharatiya Janata Party in the 2026 West Bengal Legislative Assembly election. He polled 1,36,566 votes and defeated his nearest rival, Dipendra Narayan Roy of the Trinamool Congress, by a margin of 34,729 votes. In the 2021 West Bengal Legislative Assembly election, he lost the Tamluk seat on BJP ticket to Saumen Kumar Mahapatra of the Trinamool Congress.
