= Sujit Bose (politician) =

Indian politician

Minister of State (Independent Charge), Government of West Bengal
- In office 2 May 2021 – 4 May 2026
- Governor: Jagdeep Dhankhar; La. Ganesan (additional charge); C. V. Ananda Bose; R. N. Ravi
- Department: Department of Fire and Emergency Services (I/C)
- Chief Minister: Mamata Banerjee

Member of the West Bengal Legislative Assembly
- In office 10 May 2011 – 4 May 2026
- Preceded by: Constituency established
- Succeeded by: Dr. Sharadwat Mukherjee
- Constituency: Bidhannagar

Personal details
- Born: 1 December 1962 (age 63) Kolkata, West Bengal, India
- Party: Trinamool Congress
- Profession: Politician

Sujit Bose (born 1 December 1962) is an Indian politician who served as a Minister in the Department of Fire and Emergency Services for the Government of West Bengal and also as a Member of the Legislative Assembly from Bidhannagar. He belonged to the All India Trinamool Congress. He had been elected from Bidhannagar for four terms consecutively and has served between 2009 and 2026. He lost the seat in the 2026 West Bengal Legislative Assembly election to the Bharatiya Janata Party candidate, Sharadwat Mukherjee.

The Bidhannagar constituency was formed following a delimitation exercise in West Bengal in 2008.

Following his defeat in the 2026 Legislative Assembly election, the Enforcement Directorate arrested him on 11 May 2026, following hours of interrogation regarding the Municipality recruitment scam and eventually, incarceration.
