= Mohit Sengupta =

Indian politician

Member of West Bengal Legislative Assembly
- In office 10 May 2011 – 2 May 2021
- Preceded by: Chittaranjan Roy
- Succeeded by: Krishna Kalyani
- Constituency: Raiganj

Personal details
- Party: Indian National Congress
- Profession: Politician

Mohit Sengupta is an Indian politician from Raiganj, West Bengal. He was a member of the West Bengal Legislative Assembly from 2011 to 2021, having been elected twice from the Raiganj Legislative Assembly seat.

== See also ==
- West Bengal Legislative Assembly
- 2011 West Bengal Legislative Assembly election
