= West Bengal State Council of Technical and Vocational Education and Skill Development =

Organization

West Bengal State Council of Technical & Vocational Education & Skill Development
- Abbreviation: WBSCT&VE&SD
- Established: 2005
- Type: Government organization
- Headquarters: Karigori Bhavan, 5th Floor, Plot-B/7, Action Area-III, Newtown, Rajarhat, Kolkata, West Bengal, 700160, India
- Website: https://sctvesd.wb.gov.in/

The West Bengal State Council of Technical & Vocational Education and Skill Development (Erstwhile West Bengal State Council of Vocational Education and Training) is a statutory body under the Department of Technical Education, Training and Skill Development of Government of West Bengal for administration and examining vocational courses in West Bengal. The courses are offered from various affiliated institutions, including Higher Secondary, Secondary Schools and Polytechnic Colleges across the state. Its headquarters are in Karigori Bhavan in Kolkata.

== History ==
Before 2005 West Bengal Council of Higher Secondary Education was in the administration of vocational education in West Bengal. Vocational Stream emerged as an Autonomous body in 2005 and running successfully since then in West Bengal. On 5 December 2013 the Govt. of West Bengal brought a bill in Assembly. This bill passed on 15 July 2015 in the Assembly and a new Council was formed in the name of “West Bengal State Council of Technical and Vocational Education and Skill Development” by merging ‘West Bengal State Council of Technical Education’ and ‘West Bengal State Council of Vocational Education and Training.’Presently this stream is equivalent to General Stream of H.S. Education.

== Divisions ==
- Technical Education Division
- Vocational Education Division

== Curriculum ==
The Higher Secondary Course offered by the Council consist of two parts, Class XI and Class XII. Sectionsinclude Engineering and Technology, Agriculture, Business and Commerce, Home Science. Subjects under Higher Secondary Examination level are

- 1st Language
- 2nd Language

Language group is common to all. Available languages are Bengali, Hindi, Nepali, and English.

Also common subjects like Technical Drawing, Physics, Chemistry, Mathematics Also certificate course for VIII pass students is also offered from this council under various affiliated Institutes. These courses are-

=== Engineering and technology ===
- Civil Construction and Maintenance Technology
- Automobile Mechanics
- Air-Conditioner and Refrigerator Mechanic
- Computer Assembly & Maintenance
- Computer Application
- IT Enabled Services
- Maintenance & Repair of Electrical Domestic Appliances
- Consumer & Industrial Electronics Mechanics

=== Agriculture ===
- Marine Fisheries
- Ornamental Fish Culture
- Mushroom Cultivation
- Composting

=== Business ===
- Marketing and salesmanship
- Modern Office Practice
- Library and Information Service
- Travel & Tourism

=== Home Science ===
- Tailoring
- Commercial Art
- Jori and Kantha Embroidery
- Toy making
- Interior Decoration

=== Business and Commerce ===
- Rural Marketing
- Marketing

=== Paramedical ===
- Blood collection assistant
- Health worker

== Facility to Diploma Engineering ==
Students can apply to enter in 2nd year of Diploma Engineering of West Bengal State Council of Technical Education through a VOCLET (Lateral Entry) examination after passing (X+2) level course of WBSCVET.
