= Lalchand Fulamali =

Indian politician (born 1935)

Lalchand Fulamali (Bengali: লালচাঁদ ফুলমালি) (born November 1935) is an Indian politician, hailing from Brahmanbahara village in Birbhum District. Fulamali became a member of the Communist Party of India in 1957 and represented the party in the West Bengal Legislative Assembly from 1971 to 1977.

== Youth ==
Fulamali was born in Bramhanbahara. His father was Nanigopal Fulamali. He was educated at Bramhanbahara Primary Vidyalaya and completed the 4th grade .

== Political worker ==
Fulamali became a member of the CPI in 1957. He was active in the local area and became a member of the gram panchayat ('village council'). In 1962 he was jailed during a food movement. Fulamali stood as the CPI candidate in the Mayureswar (SC) constituency in the 1967 West Bengal Legislative Assembly election; with 5,738 votes (19.28%) he finished in third place behind the Congress and CPI(M) candidates. He did not contest the subsequent 1969 West Bengal Legislative Assembly election. From 1967-1970 he was arrested at a number of times.

== Legislator ==
He was elected to the West Bengal Legislative Assembly in the 1971 election and the 1972 election from the Mayureswar (SC) constituency. In 1971 he obtained 10,925 (35.13%) defeating Congress, CPI(M) and Congress(O) candidates. In 1972 he obtained 15,089 (50.74%), defeating the CPI(M) and Congress(O) candidates.

== Later period ==
Fulamali lost the Mayureswar (SC) seat in the 1977 West Bengal Legislative Assembly election, where he finished in third place with 4,760 votes (13.60%). As of 2014 Fulamali was involved in an all-party committee demanding to secure a hospital at Mayureswar.
