= Tamluk Assembly constituency =

Tamluk
- Constituency No. 203 for the West Bengal Legislative Assembly
- Interactive Map Outlining Tamluk Assembly Constituency

Constituency details
- Country: India
- Region: East India
- State: West Bengal
- District: Purba Medinipur
- Lok Sabha constituency: Tamluk
- Established: 1951
- Total electors: 209,751
- Reservation: None

Member of Legislative Assembly
- 18th West Bengal Legislative Assembly
- Incumbent Dr. Hare Krishna Bera
- Party: BJP
- Alliance: NDA
- Elected year: 2026
- Preceded by: Soumen Mahapatra

Most Successful parties from Tamluk assembly
1. Indian National Congress (7 times) (36.8%)
2. Communist Party of India (5 times) (26.3%)
3. Bangla Congress (3 times) (15.8%)
4. All India Trinamool Congress (3 time) (15.8%)
5. Bharatiya Janata Party (1 time) (5.26%)

Tamluk Assembly constituency is an assembly constituency in Purba Medinipur district in the Indian state of West Bengal.

== Overview ==
As per orders of the Delimitation Commission, No. 203 Tamluk Assembly constituency is composed of the following: Tamluk municipality, Bishnubarh II, Pipulberia I, Pipulberia II and Uttar Sonamui gram panchayats of Tamluk community development block, and Sahid Matangini community development block.

Tamluk Assembly constituency is part of No. 30 Tamluk (Lok Sabha constituency).

== Members of the Legislative Assembly ==
Year	Name	Party
1951	Ajoy Mukherjee	Indian National Congress
1957	Ajoy Mukherjee	Indian National Congress
1962	Ajoy Mukherjee	Indian National Congress
1967	Ajoy Mukherjee	Bangla Congress
1967^	Ajoy Malakar	Bangla Congress
1969	Ajoy Mukherjee	Bangla Congress
1971	Ajoy Mukherjee	Bangla Congress
1972	Ajoy Mukherjee	Indian National Congress
1977	Biswanath Mukherjee	Communist Party of India
1982	Biswanath Mukherjee	Communist Party of India
1987	Surajit Bagchi	Communist Party of India
1991	Anil Mudi	Indian National Congress
1996	Anil Mudi	Indian National Congress
2001	Nirbed Roy	Trinamool Congress
2006	Jagannath Mitra	Communist Party of India
2011	Dr. Soumen Mahapatra	Trinamool Congress
2016	Ashok Kumar Dinda	Communist Party of India
2021	Soumen Kumar Mahapatra	Trinamool Congress
2026	Hare Krishna Bera	Bharatiya Janata Party

- ^ by-election

== Election results ==
Vote share of Winning candidates
2026	53.15%
2021	45.86%
2016	44.72%
2011	52.82%
2006	49.00%
2001	49.78%
1996	46.99%
1991	46.25%
1987	51.58%
1982	52.34%
1977	27.13%
1972	74.54%
1971	63.85%
1969	76.10%
1967 (by-poll)	87.54%
1967	81.66%
1962	52.39%
1957	57.56%
1951	47.20%

=== 2026 ===
2026 West Bengal Legislative Assembly election: Tamluk
Party	Candidate	Votes	%	±%
BJP	Hare Krishna Bera	136,566	53.15	▲7.63
AITC	Dipendra Narayan Roy	101,837	39.64	▼6.22
CPI	Nabendu Ghara	8,801	3.43	▼2.81
JUNP	Ajijul Mallik	3,471	1.35	
NOTA	None of the above	1,583	0.62	▲0.14
Majority		34,729	13.51	▲13.17
Turnout		256,930	93.49	▲5.05
BJP gain from AITC		Swing		

=== 2021 ===
2021 West Bengal Legislative Assembly election: Tamluk
Party	Candidate	Votes	%	±%
AITC	Saumen Kumar Mahapatra	108,243	45.86	
BJP	Hare Krishna Bera	107,450	45.52	
CPI	Goutam Panda	14,718	6.24	
SUCI(C)	Jnanananda Roy	2,756	1.17	
NOTA	None of the Above	1,136	0.48	
IND	Bhim Patra	774	0.33	
IND	Sandip Batabyal	762	0.32	
AMB	Sulalit Mallick	192	0.08	
Majority		793	0.34	
Turnout		236,031	88.44	
Swing to AITC from CPI		Swing		

=== 2016 ===
2016 West Bengal Legislative Assembly election: Tamluk
Party	Candidate	Votes	%	±%
CPI	Ashok Dinda	95,432	44.72	
AITC	Nirbed Ray	94,912	44.47	
BJP	Biswajit Dutta (Mana)	14,144	6.63	
SUCI(C)	Satish Sau	4,244	1.99	
NOTA	None of the Above	2,394	1.12	
IND	Gautam Dutta	874	0.41	
BHNP	Ranjan Malakar	758	0.36	
RAJSP	Tapas Chakraborty	329	0.15	
IUC	Rejman Mullick	323	0.15	
Majority		520	0.25	
Turnout		213,410	87.83	
Swing to CPI from AITC		Swing		

=== 2011 ===
2011 West Bengal Legislative Assembly election: Tamluk
Party	Candidate	Votes	%	±%
AITC	Saumen Kumar Mahapatra	99,765	52.82	
CPI	Jagannath Mitra	79,089	41.88	
BJP	Malay Kumar Singha	5,423	2.87	
IND	Ram Chandra Maity	1,610	0.85	
PDCI (Note: People's Democratic Conference of India)	Sk. Khairuddin Rahaman	1,563	0.83	
IUC (Note: Indian Unity Centre)	Ataul Rahaman Bhuniya	1,414	0.75	
Majority		20,676	10.94	
Turnout		188,864	89.96	
Swing to AITC from CPI		Swing		

=== 2006 ===
2006 West Bengal Legislative Assembly election: Tamluk
Party	Candidate	Votes	%	±%
CPI	Jagannath Mitra	74,425	49.00	
AITC	Chitta Ranjan Maiti	63,485	41.97	
INC	Anil Mudi	6,197	4.08	
IND	Tapan Bhaumik	5,996	3.95	
SP	Rameshwar Upadhyay	1,781	1.17	
Majority		10,940	7.03	
Turnout		151,884		
Swing to CPI from AITC		Swing		

=== 2001 ===
2001 West Bengal Legislative Assembly election: Tamluk
Party	Candidate	Votes	%	±%
AITC	Nirbed Roy	69,630	49.78	
CPI	Santosh Rana	62,184	44.45	
IND	Tapan Bhaumik	3,182	2.27	
BJP	Sudhansusekhar Samanta	2,821	2.02	
IND	Subhasish Basu	908	0.65	
IND	Sowkat Mallik	695	0.50	
IND	Tushar Kanti Das	466	0.33	
Majority		7,446	5.33	
Turnout		139,903	86.69	
Swing to AITC from INC		Swing		

=== 1996 ===
1996 West Bengal Legislative Assembly election: Tamluk
Party	Candidate	Votes	%	±%
INC	Anil Mudi	61,409	46.99	
CPI	Surajit Bagchi	61,079	46.74	
IND	Manab Bera	4,488	3.43	
BJP	Matilal Khatua	3,346	2.56	
IND	Sudhir Ranjan Adhikary	266	0.20	
IND	Tridivesh Pramanik	90	0.07	
Majority		330	0.25	
Turnout		132,499	89.25	
INC hold		Swing		

=== 1991 ===
1991 West Bengal Legislative Assembly election: Tamluk
Party	Candidate	Votes	%	±%
INC	Anil Mudi	50,032	46.25	
CPI	Surajit Saran Bagchi	45,557	42.11	
BJP	Kanai Lal Nayak	5,359	4.95	
IND	Manab Bera	4,662	4.31	
IND	Sunil Kumar Sarkar	2,572	2.38	
Majority		4,475	4.14	
Turnout		110,810	78.12	
Swing to INC from CPI		Swing		

=== 1987 ===
1987 West Bengal Legislative Assembly election: Tamluk
Party	Candidate	Votes	%	±%
CPI	Surajit Saran Bagchi	48,279	51.58	
INC	Anil Chandra Mudi	39,888	42.62	
SUCI(C)	Asutosh Samanta	4,485	4.79	
IND	Nagendra Nath Pattanayak	632	0.68	
IND	Ahindra Misra	313	0.33	
Majority		8,391	8.96	
Turnout		94,990	83.43	
CPI hold		Swing		

=== 1982 ===
1982 West Bengal Legislative Assembly election: Tamluk
Party	Candidate	Votes	%	±%
CPI	Biswanath Mukherjee	43,457	52.34	
IC(S)	Sukumar Das	34,312	41.32	
SUCI(C)	Manab Bera	4,956	5.97	
IND	Milan Kuila	305	0.37	
Majority		9,145	11.02	
Turnout		84,252	84.66	
CPI hold		Swing		

=== 1977 ===
1977 West Bengal Legislative Assembly election: Tamluk
Party	Candidate	Votes	%	±%
CPI	Biswanath Mukherjee	14,449	27.13	
INC	Sukumar Das	14,333	26.91	
JP	Pannalal Bhattacharyya	12,382	23.25	
CPI(M)	Deba Prasad Bhowmik	10,388	19.50	
IND	Radhaballav Bera	780	1.46	
IND	Baneswar Das	521	0.98	
IND	Jagadish Chandra Si	264	0.50	
IND	Surendra Nath Gorai	146	0.27	
Majority		116	0.22	
Turnout		53,999	61.70	
Swing to CPI from INC		Swing		

=== 1972 ===
1972 West Bengal Legislative Assembly election: Tamluk
Party	Candidate	Votes	%	±%
INC	Ajoy Mukherjee	33,924	74.54	
CPI(M)	Deva Prasad Bhowmik	11,040	24.26	
IND	Mangorinda Manna	547	1.20	
Majority		22,884	50.28	
Turnout		46,902	58.49	
Swing to INC from Bangla Congress		Swing		

=== 1971 ===
1971 West Bengal Legislative Assembly election: Tamluk
Party	Candidate	Votes	%	±%
BAC	Ajoy Mukherjee	32,498	63.85	
CPI(M)	Deva Prasad Bhowmik	12,425	24.41	
INC(O)	Radha Ballav Bera	2,862	5.62	
IND	Shibjee Dobey	2,240	4.40	
IND	Birendra Nath Parai	874	1.72	
Majority		20,073	39.44	
Turnout		54,012	68.76	
Bangla Congress hold		Swing		

=== 1969 ===
1969 West Bengal Legislative Assembly election: Tamluk
Party	Candidate	Votes	%	±%
BAC	Ajoy Mukherjee	41,094	76.10	
INC	Kumar Chandra Jana	12,905	23.90	
Majority		28,189	52.20	
Turnout		54,968	75.56	
Bangla Congress hold		Swing		

=== 1967 by-election ===
1967 Tamluk Assembly by-election
Party	Candidate	Votes	%	±%
BAC	Ajoy Malakar	33,606	87.54	
INC	H. Adhhikary	3,285	8.56	
IND	S. N. Ghori	1,499	3.90	
Majority		30,321	78.98	
Turnout				
Bangla Congress hold		Swing		

=== 1967 ===
1967 West Bengal Legislative Assembly election: Tamluk
Party	Candidate	Votes	%	±%
BAC	Ajoy Mukherjee	47,099	81.66	
INC	S. N. Mandal	10,580	18.34	
Majority		36,519	63.32	
Turnout		58,965	81.37	
Swing to Bangla Congress from INC		Swing		

=== 1962 ===
1962 West Bengal Legislative Assembly election: Tamluk
Party	Candidate	Votes	%	±%
INC	Ajoy Mukherjee	25,993	52.39	
CPI	Deva Prasad Bhowmik	23,624	47.61	
Majority		2,369	4.78	
Turnout		51,063	72.57	
INC hold		Swing		

=== 1957 ===
1957 West Bengal Legislative Assembly election: Tamluk
Party	Candidate	Votes	%	±%
INC	Ajoy Mukherjee	26,522	57.56	
CPI	Biswanath Mukherjee	19,553	42.44	
Majority		6,969	15.12	
Turnout		46,075	71.42	
INC hold		Swing		

=== 1951 ===
1951 West Bengal Legislative Assembly election: Tamluk
Party	Candidate	Votes	%	±%
INC	Ajoy Mukherjee	15,351	47.20	
CPI	Biswanath Mukherjee	12,945	39.81	
ABJS	Gorachand Giri	2,706	8.32	
KMPP	Bholanath Mahapatra	1,519	4.67	
Majority		2,406	7.39	
Turnout		32,521	67.56	
INC win (new seat)				
