= Sumita Sinha =

Indian politician

Member of the West Bengal Legislative Assembly
- Incumbent
- Assumed office 2 May 2021
- Preceded by: Banasri Maity
- Constituency: Kanthi Uttar

Personal details
- Born: January 19, 1968 (age 58)
- Party: Bharatiya Janata Party
- Education: B.Sc
- Profession: Businessman

Sumita Sinha is an Indian politician from West Bengal. She was elected to the West Bengal Legislative Assembly from Kanthi Uttar as a member of the Bharatiya Janata Party.

== Political career ==
She is a member of West Bengal Legislative Assembly, from Kanthi Uttar Assembly constituency.

=== Electoral performance ===
West Bengal Legislative Assembly
Year	Constituency	Party	Votes	%	Opponent	Party	Votes	%	Margin	Result
2026	Kanthi Uttar	BJP	130,088	52.16	Debasis Bhunya	AITC	110,033	44.12	20,055	Won

== See also ==
- 2026 West Bengal Legislative Assembly election
- List of chief ministers of West Bengal
- West Bengal Legislative Assembly
