= Chittaranjan Roy =

Indian politician

Member of West Bengal Legislative Assembly
- In office 10 May 2001 – 17 April 2006
- Preceded by: Dilip Kumar Das
- Constituency: Raiganj

Member of West Bengal Legislative Assembly
- In office 8 May 2006 – 18 April 2011
- Succeeded by: Mohit Sengupta

Personal details
- Party: Indian National Congress
- Profession: Politician, Teacher

Chittaranjan Roy was an Indian politician and teacher from Raiganj in West Bengal. He was a Member of the West Bengal Legislative Assembly from 2001 to 2011, representing the Raiganj Legislative Assembly seat on an Indian National Congress ticket.

== See also ==
- 2001 West Bengal Legislative Assembly election
- West Bengal Legislative Assembly
