= Dhiren Let =

Indian politician (born 1945)

Member of West Bengal Legislative Assembly
- In office 1982–1998
- Preceded by: Panchanan Let
- Constituency: Mayureswar

President of Birbhum Zilla Parishad
- In office 1998–2003

Personal details
- Born: 1945
- Party: Communist Party of India (Marxist)

Dhiren Let is an Indian politician and the former four-time MLA of Mayureswar Assembly constituency in the state of West Bengal, India. He is a member of Communist Party of India (Marxist) (CPI(M)). He is a prominent leader of CPI(M) in the district of Birbhum in West Bengal. He was the Birbhum Zilla Parishad chief from 1998 to 2003.

Dhiren Let belongs to the village of Paruliya in Mayureshwar, Birbhum, West Bengal. He works as a share cropper. He lives with his wife Sandhya.

In November 2015, before the 2016 West Bengal Legislative Assembly election, he was attacked by Trinamool Congress goons and was seriously injured.

He is active leader with the All India Kisan Sabha and the All India Agricultural Workers Union.
