= Biswanath Mukherjee (politician) =

Indian politician

Cabinet Minister, Government of West Bengal
- In office 1982–1987
- Ministry: Minister, Irrigation, Water Investigation & Development Department, Government of West Bengal

Member of the West Bengal Legislative Assembly
- In office 1977–1987
- Preceded by: Ajoy Mukherjee
- Succeeded by: Surajit Saran Bagchi
- Constituency: Tamluk

Member of the West Bengal Legislative Assembly
- In office 1971–1977
- Preceded by: Kamakhya Charan Ghosh
- Succeeded by: Bankim Behari Pal
- Constituency: Midnapore

Personal details
- Born: 17 April 1915 Tamluk, Bengal Presidency, British India
- Died: 16 October 1991 (aged 76) Calcutta, West Bengal, India
- Party: Communist Party of India
- Spouse: Geeta Mukherjee
- Children: 1 son (deceased in 1949); Bhagabat Jana (adopted)
- Relatives: Madhumita Jana (grandchild)
- Education: Vidyasagar College B.A.

Biswanath Mukherjee (17 April 1915 – 16 October 1991) was an Indian politician and leader of Communist Party of India. He was elected as a Member of Legislative Assembly in 1971 from Midnapore Constituency and 1977 and 1982 from Tamluk Constituency.

He started his political career as a student; he was one of the founder leaders of All India Students' Federation in Bengal. He was the Joint Secretary of AISF. In 1938, students of Calcutta University refused to salute the British flag and restricted by Syama Prasad Mukherjee. He led the huge students' movement to revoke their restriction.

He was married to Geeta Mukherjee on 8 November 1942.
