= Suniti Chattaraj =

Indian politician

MLA of Suri
- In office 1972–1987
- Preceded by: Protiva Mukherjee
- Succeeded by: Tapan Roy
- In office 1996–1999
- Preceded by: Tapan Roy
- Succeeded by: Braja Mukherjee

Personal details
- Born: 30 October 1938
- Died: 9 January 2017 (aged 78) Kolkata, West Bengal, India
- Party: Trinamool Congress
- Education: Kolkata University

Suniti Chattaraj (30 November 1943 – 9 January 2017) was an Indian lawyer and politician belonging to Trinamool Congress. He was a former state minister of West Bengal Government. He was elected as a legislator in West Bengal Legislative Assembly for four times.

== Biography ==
Chattaraj was born on 30 November 1943. He was a student of Kolkata University's Law department. After finishing student he practised law.

Chattaraj lost from Suri in 1971. He was elected a member of West Bengal Legislative Assembly from Suri in 1972. After electing he was appointed as Electricity, Irrigation and Water Resource State Minister of West Bengal Government. He was elected again as MLA of Suri in 1977. He was elected from Suri for consecutive three times in 1982.

Chattaraj lost in 1987 and 1991. He was elected as MLA of Suri in 1996.

Chattaraj resigned in 1998 and became a candidate in Bolpur in general election but, he could not win. He joined Trinamool Congress in 1999. He lost again from Bolpur in 1999.

Chattaraj lost bypoll in Suri in 2000. He lost agrain in 2001 when he contested from Suri.

Chattaraj died on 9 January 2017.

== Controversy ==
For Chattaraj's corruption charge he was sacked from West Bengal Government. He was arrested on 12 January 2006 for another corruption charge.
