= Protiva Mukherjee =

Indian politician

- Born: 1934; Birbhum district, West Bengal, India
- Died: 2013 (aged 78–79)
- Occupation: Politician

Protiva Mukherjee (1934–2013) was an Indian politician, belonging to the Socialist Unity Centre of India (Communist).

== Biography ==
Mukherjee was born in 1934 in a middle-class family in Birbhum District. After joining SUCI she became active in organizing peasants in her district. She contested the Suri constituency seat in the 1962 West Bengal Legislative Assembly election, finishing in second place with 7,702 votes (21.12%). She again contested the Suri seat in the 1967 West Bengal Legislative Assembly election, finishing in second place with 14,828 votes (36.34%). As of 1968 she served as president of the Birbhum District Central Co-operative Bank Limited Employees Union, based in Suri.

She was elected to the West Bengal Legislative Assembly from the Suri constituency seat in the 1969 and 1971 elections. In the 1969 West Bengal Legislative Assembly election she got 27,517 votes (57.40%). She held the post of Minister of State for Roads and Road Development in the second United Front government of West Bengal, formed in 1969. She was the only female minister in the West Bengal government at the time. In the 1971 West Bengal Legislative Assembly election she got 12,060 votes (34.54% of the votes in Suri), defeating the candidates of CPI(M), Bangla Congress and Congress(I). In the violent environment of the area during the polls, Mukherjee was the sole prominent local political leader that had not sought refugee elsewhere.

Mukherjee lost the Suri seat in the 1972 West Bengal Legislative Assembly election, being defeated by the Congress(I) candidate in a straight contest. She got 20,894 votes (44.01%). She again contested the Suri seat in the 1977 West Bengal Legislative Assembly election, finishing in third place behind the Congress(I) and CPI(M) candidates. She got 9,880 votes (19.50%). She again finished in third place in Suri in the 1982 West Bengal Legislative Assembly election, winning 4,797 votes (5.88%).

Mukherjee died in 2013.
