= Umapada Bauri =

Indian politician

- Born: March 12, 1983 (age 42); Para, Purulia district, West Bengal
- Occupation: politician

Umapada Bauri (12 March 1983) is an Indian politician from West Bengal. He is a former member of the West Bengal Legislative Assembly from Para Assembly constituency, which is reserved for Scheduled Caste community, in Purulia district. He was last elected in the 2016 West Bengal Legislative Assembly election representing the All India Trinamool Congress.

== Early life and education ==
Bauri is from Para, Purulia district, West Bengal. He is the son of Rajdeb Bauri. He completed his BA at Raghunathpur College in the year 2006. He is a primary school teacher.

== Career ==
Bauri was first elected as an MLA in the Para Assembly constituency representing the Indian National Congress Party in the 2011 West Bengal Legislative Assembly election. He polled 62,208 votes and defeated his nearest rival, Dipak Bauri of the Communist Party of India (Marxist), by a margin of 586 votes. Later, he shifted to the All India Trinamool Congress. He contested the 2016 West Bengal Legislative Assembly election on Trinamool Congress ticket and retained the Para seat. In 2016, he polled 84,337 votes and defeated his closest opponent, Dinanath Bauri of the Communist Party of India (Marxist), by a margin of 13,878 votes. In the 2021 West Bengal Legislative Assembly election, he lost to Nadiar Chand Bouri of the Bharatiya Janata Party by a margin of 4,007 votes.
