= Jagannath Chattopadhyay =

Indian politician in West Bengal

Cabinet Minister, Government of West Bengal
- Incumbent
- Assumed office 1 June 2026
- Governor: R. N. Ravi
- Chief Minister: Suvendu Adhikari
- Departments: Higher Education and Technical Education; Training and Skill Development

Member of the West Bengal Legislative Assembly
- Incumbent
- Assumed office 4 May 2026
- Preceded by: Bikash Roy Chowdhury
- Constituency: Suri

Vice President, Bharatiya Janata Party - West Bengal
- In office July 2026 – September 2026
- President: Samik Bhattacharya

General Secretary, Bharatiya Janata Party - West Bengal
- In office 2021–2026
- President: Sukanta Majumder; Samik Bhattacharya

Personal details
- Party: Bharatiya Janata Party
- Spouse: Debapriya Chattopadhyay
- Education: University of Burdwan, (BSc); Calcutta University, (MA)
- Profession: Politician, Journalist

Jagannath Chattopadhay is a politician from West Bengal. He is a member of West Bengal Legislative Assembly, from Suri Assembly constituency. He is a member of Bharatiya Janata Party.He is currently serving as the Minister of Higher Education and Technical Education and Training and Skill Development of West Bengal.

== Early life and education ==
He is from Birbhum district of West Bengal. He has done B.Sc in Physics from the University of Burdwan in the year of 1996 and Masters of Arts in Journalism & Mass Communication in the year of 2001 under the Calcutta University.

== Political career ==
=== Early politics ===
Chattopadhyay was appointed as one of the general secretary of the West Bengal unit of the Bharatiya Janata Party in 2021. His appointment was contributed to his influence on the administrative sphere within West Bengal. In early 2026, ahead of the assembly elections, he was appointed as one of the vice presidents of the state unit of the party.

=== 2026 elections and appointment as cabinet minister ===
He is a member of West Bengal Legislative Assembly, from Suri Assembly constituency. He is currently serving as an MLA and The Higher education, Technical education Minister of West Bengal.

On 1 June 2026, he was sworn in as a Cabinet Minister of West Bengal, along with twelve other members.

== Electoral performance ==
West Bengal Legislative Assembly
Year	Constituency	Party	Votes	%	Opponent	Party	Votes	%	Margin	Result
2026	Suri	BJP	1,24,243	52.09	Bikash Roy Chowdhury	AITC	95,557	40.07	28,686	Won

== See also ==
- 2026 West Bengal Legislative Assembly election
- List of chief ministers of West Bengal
- West Bengal Legislative Assembly
