= Biswanath Mukherjee =

Indian-American Distinguished Professor of computer science

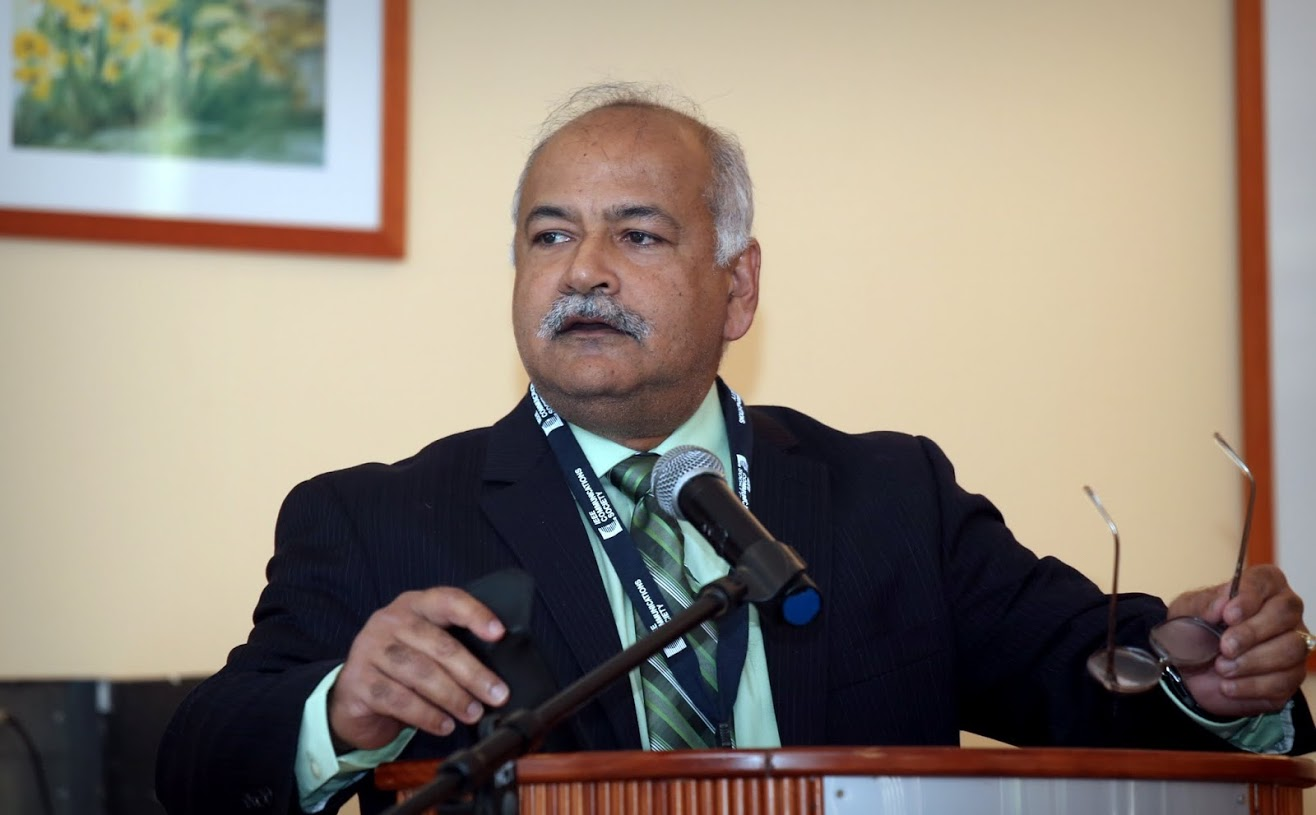
- Education: Indian Institute of Technology Kharagpur
- Scientific career
- Fields: Computer science
- Workplaces: University of California, Davis
- Website: https://networks.cs.ucdavis.edu/bmukherjee.html

Biswanath Mukherjee is an Indian-American Distinguished Professor of Computer Science at the University of California, Davis. His research focuses on optical networking architectures, algorithms, and protocols. He was elected an IEEE Fellow in 2007.

== Early life ==
Mukherjee received his Bachelor of Technology degree with honors from the Indian Institute of Technology Kharagpur in 1980 and completed his Ph.D. in computer science at the University of Washington in 1987. That same year, he joined the faculty of the computer science department at UC Davis. He was promoted to professor in 1995, held the Child Family Professorship from 1999 to 2000, and served as department chair from 1997 to 2000. In 2011, he was named a Distinguished Professor.

== Career ==
Mukherjee served as Technical Program Chair for the IEEE INFOCOM 1996 conference in 1996, Technical Program Co-Chair for the Optical Fiber Communication Conference 2009 in 2009, and General Co-Chair in 2011.

Mukherjee is editor of the Springer book series on optical networks. He has served on the editorial boards of several journals, including IEEE/ACM Transactions on Networking and IEEE Network. He also serves on the advisory board of IEEE Communications Surveys & Tutorials. In addition, he has guest-edited special issues for journals including Proceedings of the IEEE, Journal of Lightwave Technology, IEEE Journal on Selected Areas in Communications, and IEEE Communications Magazine.

He was the first elected chair of the Optical Networking Technical Committee of the IEEE Communications Society.

Mukherjee was a founding board member of IPLocks from 2002 to 2007. The company was later acquired by Fortinet. He also served on the founding board of directors of Optella from 2015 to 2018; the company was subsequently acquired by Cosemi. He has also served on the technical advisory board of Teknovus, which was acquired by Broadcom.

Mukherjee is the founder and president of Ennetix, a network analytics startup incubated at University of California, Davis.

== Research and Contributions ==
- First proposal/prototype for a network intrusion detection system (1990): L. Todd Heberlein, B. Mukherjee, et al., "A Network Security Monitor (NSM)," Proc., 1990 IEEE Symposium on Security and Privacy, pp. 296–304, Oakland, CA, May 1990.
- First proposal/prototype for a filtering firewall (1990): C. Kwok and B. Mukherjee, "Cut-through bridging for CSMA/CD Local Area Networks," IEEE Transactions on Communications, vol. 38, pp. 938–942, July 1990.
- First proposal/prototype for dynamic bandwidth allocation in Ethernet optical access networks (2002): G. Kramer, B. Mukherjee, and G. Pesavento, "IPACT: A dynamic protocol for an Ethernet PON," IEEE Communications Magazine, vol. 40, no. 2, pp. 74–80, Feb. 2002.
- First proposal to integrate optical and wireless networks (2007): Suman Sarkar, Sudhir Dixit, and Biswanath Mukherjee, "Hybrid Wireless-Optical Broadband Access Network (WOBAN): A Review of Relevant Challenges," IEEE/OSA Journal of Lightwave Technology, vol. 25, no. 11, Nov. 2007.

== Selected awards ==
- 1991: Co-winner, Best Paper Award, 14th National Computer Security Conference, for the paper "DIDS (Distributed Intrusion Detection System – Motivation, Architecture, and an Early Prototype."
- 1994: Co-winner, Paper Award, 17th National Computer Security Conference, for the paper "Testing Intrusion Detection Systems: Design Methodologies and Results from an Early Prototype."
- 2004: Distinguished Graduate Mentoring Award, University of California, Davis.
- 2009: Winner, Outstanding Senior Faculty Award, College of Engineering, UC Davis.
- 2015: Winner of the IEEE Communications Society's inaugural Outstanding Technical Achievement Award "for pioneering work on shaping the optical networking area."
- 2016: Winner, of UC Davis International Community Building Award.
- 2017: IEEE Communications Society's Transmission, Access, and Optical Systems (TAOS) Best Paper Award for IEEE Globecom 2017 Optical Networks and Systems (ONS) Symposium, along with his co-authors, for the paper "TDM EPON Fronthaul Upstream Capacity Improvement Via Classification and Sifting".
- 2018: IEEE Communications Society Charles Kao Award (named after Nobel Laureate and Fiber Optic Pioneer Charles Kao) for the Best Paper in the IEEE Journal on Optical Communications and Networks (JOCN), along with his co-authors for the paper "5G Fronthaul–Latency and Jitter Studies of CPRI Over Ethernet".
- 2026: IEEE Eric E. Sumner Award, "for pioneering contributions to optical networks and systems"

== Bibliography ==
- Optical Communication (1997)
- Survivable Optical WDM Networks (2005; with Canhui Ou)
- Traffic Grooming in Optical WDM Mesh Networks (2005; with Keyao Zhu and Hongyue Zhu)
- Optical WDM Networks (2006)
