= GSAT-17 =

Indian telecommunications satellite

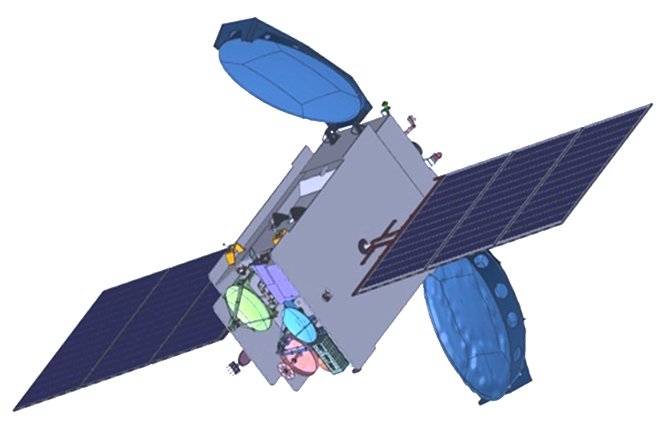
- Mission type: Communication
- Operator: Indian National Satellite System
- COSPAR ID: 2017-040B
- SATCAT no.: 42815
- Website: http://www.isro.gov.in/Spacecraft/gsat-17
- Mission duration: Planned: 15 years Elapsed: 9 years, 2 months, 28 days

Spacecraft properties
- Bus: I-3K
- Manufacturer: ISRO Satellite Centre; Space Applications Centre
- Launch mass: 3,477 kg (7,665 lb)
- Dry mass: 1,480 kg (3,263 lb)
- Power: 6,200 watts

Start of mission
- Launch date: 28 June 2017, 21:15 UTC
- Rocket: Ariane 5 ECA, VA238
- Launch site: Guiana Space Centre, ELA-3
- Contractor: Arianespace

Orbital parameters
- Reference system: Geocentric
- Regime: Geostationary
- Longitude: 93.5° E

Transponders
- Band: 24 × C band 2 × lower C band 12 × upper C band 2 × C-up/S-down; 1 × S-up/C-down; 1 × DRT & SAR
- Coverage area: India, Middle East, Southeast Asia and Antarctica

GSAT-17 is an Indian communications satellite. Built by ISRO and operated by INSAT, it carries 24 C-band, 2 lower C-band, 12 upper C-band, 2 CxS (C-band up/S-band down), and 1 SxC (S-band up/C-band down) transponders. It additionally carries a dedicated transponder for data relay (DRT) and search-and-rescue (SAR) services. At the time of launch, GSAT-17 was the heaviest satellite built by ISRO.

The satellite was launched on 28 June 2017 aboard an Ariane 5 ECA rocket from the Guiana Space Centre in Kourou, French Guiana. GSAT-17 is the 21st satellite from ISRO to be launched by Arianespace.
