= Department of Technical Education, Training and Skill Development =

West Bengal government department

Department overview
- Jurisdiction: Government of West Bengal
- Headquarters: Karigari Bhawan, MAR(E-W), Newtown, Dharmatala Pachuria, New Town, West Bengal 700156
- Minister responsible: Jagannath Chattopadhyay, Cabinet minister
- Deputy Minister responsible: Hare Krishna Bera, Minister of State
- Department executive: Anoop Kumar Agrawal, IAS, Additional Chief Secretary
- Child agencies: WBSCT&VE&SD; West Bengal State Council for Vocational Training; Paschimbanga Society for Skill Development
- Website: Official Website

The Department of Technical Education, Training and Skill Development is a West Bengal government department. It is an interior ministry mainly responsible for the administration of the development of Technical Education.

== Verticals and Sections ==
- Establishment Section
- Budget Section
- Directorate of Industrial Training
- Directorate of Vocational Education and Training
- Directorate of Technical Education

== Four tiers of Upskilling Programme ==
- Panchayat Level
  - Vocational Education and Training Centers
- Block Level
  - Industrial Training Centers
- Subdivision Level
  - Polytechnique
- State Level
  - Centers of Excellence in Industrial Education

== Ministers ==
- Jagannath Chattopadhyay (01 June 2026 - Incumbent)
- Hare Krishna Bera, MoS (01 June 2026 - Incumbent)
- Indranil Sen (3 August 2022 - 7 May 2026)
- Humayun Kabir (10 May 2021 - 3 August 2022)
- Purnendu Basu (2017 - 4 May 2021)
- Ashima Patra (26 May 2016 - 2017)
- Purnendu Basu (20 May 2011 - 25 May 2016)
- Chakradhar Meikap (18 May 2006 - 19 May 2011)
- Mohammed Salim (15 May 2001 - 17 May 2004)
- Satya Sadhan Chakraborty (1991 - 2001)
