= Para Assembly constituency =

Para
- Constituency No. 245 for the West Bengal Legislative Assembly
- Interactive Map Outlining Para Assembly Constituency

Constituency details
- Country: India
- Region: East India
- State: West Bengal
- District: Purulia
- Lok Sabha constituency: Purulia
- Established: 1962
- Total electors: 184,034
- Reservation: SC

Member of Legislative Assembly
- 18th West Bengal Legislative Assembly
- Incumbent Nadiar Chand Bouri
- Party: BJP
- Alliance: NDA
- Elected year: 2021

Para Assembly constituency is an assembly constituency in Purulia district in the Indian state of West Bengal. It is reserved for scheduled castes.

== Overview ==
As per orders of the Delimitation Commission, No. 245 Para Assembly constituency (SC) is composed of the following: Para and Raghunathpur II community development blocks.

Para Assembly constituency is part of No. 35 Purulia (Lok Sabha constituency). It was earlier part of Bankura (Lok Sabha constituency).

== Members of the Legislative Assembly ==
Year	Name	Party
1962	Nepal Bauri	Indian National Congress
1967	S. Bauri	Bangla Congress
1969	Tinkori Bauri	Bangla Congress
1971	Sarat Das	Indian National Congress
1972	Sarat Das	Indian National Congress
1977	Gobinda Bauri	Communist Party of India (Marxist)
1982	Gobinda Bauri	Communist Party of India (Marxist)
1987	Gobinda Bauri	Communist Party of India (Marxist)
1991	Bilasibala Sahis	Communist Party of India (Marxist)
1996	Bilasibala Sahis	Communist Party of India (Marxist)
2001	Bilasibala Sahis	Communist Party of India (Marxist)
2006	Bilasibala Sahis	Communist Party of India (Marxist)
2009^	Minu Bauri	Communist Party of India
2011	Umapada Bauri	Indian National Congress
2016	Umapada Bauri	All India Trinamool Congress
2021	Nadiar Chand Bouri	Bharatiya Janata Party
2026	Nadiar Chand Bouri	Bharatiya Janata Party

- ^ by-election

== Election results ==
=== 2026 ===
2026 West Bengal Legislative Assembly election: Para
Party	Candidate	Votes	%	±%
BJP	Nadiar Chand Bouri	113,488	52.55	+7.53
AITC	Manik Chandra Bauri	79,767	36.94	−6.01
CPI(M)	Aloke Kumar Bauri	10,419	4.82	−2.23
INC	Falguni Bauri	2,887	1.34	
NOTA	None of the above	2,788	1.29	−0.59
Majority		33,721	15.61	+13.54
Turnout		215,946	91.36	+11.81
BJP hold		Swing		

=== 2021 ===
West Bengal Legislative Assembly Election, 2021: Para
Party	Candidate	Votes	%	±%
BJP	Nadiar Chand Bouri	87,347	45.02	
AITC	Umapada Bauri	83,340	42.95	
CPI(M)	Swapan Kumar Bauri	13,681	7.05	
SUCI(C)	Jagannath Bauri	1,897	0.98	
NOTA	None of the above	3,657	1.88	
Majority		4,007	2.07	
Turnout		194,021	79.55	
BJP gain from AITC		Swing		

=== 2016 ===
2016 West Bengal Legislative Assembly election: Para
Party	Candidate	Votes	%	±%
AITC	Umapada Bauri	84,337	47.59	
CPI(M)	Dinanath Bauri	70,459	39.76	
BJP	Nadiar Chand Bouri	11,092	6.26	
JMM	Gobordhan Bagdi	2,334	1.32	
SUCI(C)	Mihir Kumar Sahis	2,211	1.25	
Independent	Ananta Rajak	1,532	0.86	
BSP	Pabitra Bauri	898	0.51	
AJSU	Uttam Das	665	0.38	
NOTA	None of the above	3,676	2.07	
Majority		13878		
Turnout		177,203	81.92	
AITC gain from INC		Swing		

=== 2011 ===
West Bengal assembly elections, 2011: Para
Party	Candidate	Votes	%	±%
INC	Umapada Bauri	62,208	42.6	+9.08#
CPI(M)	Dipak Bauri	61,622	42.2	−10.45
SUCI	Shibani Bouri	6,503	4.45	
JMM	Charan Bauri	6,302	4.32	
BJP	Swapan Bouri	4,681		
JVM(P)	Satyanarayan Rajwar	3,441		
BSP	Sandip Rajwar	1,274		
Turnout		146,031	79.35	
INC gain from CPI(M)		Swing	19.53#	

.# Swing calculated on Congress+Trinamool Congress vote percentages taken together in 2006. Intervening by-election ignored for comparisons.

=== 2009 ===
Subsequent to the resignation of the sitting MLA, Bilasibala Sahis, after her election to the Zilla Parishad (district council), Minu Bauri of CPI(M) won the Para seat in the 2009 by-elections defeating Charan Bauri of JMM.

In 2006, 2001, 1996 and 1991 Bilasibala Sahis of CPI(M) won the Para assembly seat defeating her nearest rivals Sima Bauri of Trinamool Congress, Mira Bauri of Trinamool Congress, Gobordhan Bagdi of JMM and Durgadas Bauri of Congress respectively. Contests in most years were multi cornered but only winners and runners are being mentioned. Gobinda Bauri of CPI(M) defeated Kashinath Bauri of Congress in 1987, and Sarat Das of Congress in 1982 and 1977.

=== 1972 ===
Sarat Das of Congress won in 1972 and 1971. Tinkori Bouri of Bangla Congress won in 1969. S. Bauri of Bangla Congress won in 1967. Nepal Bauri of Congress won in 1962.
