= Suri Assembly constituency =

Constituency of the West Bengal Legislative Assembly, in India

Suri
- Constituency No. 285 for the West Bengal Legislative Assembly
- Interactive Map Outlining Suri Assembly Constituency

Constituency details
- Country: India
- Region: East India
- State: West Bengal
- Division: Burdwan
- District: Birbhum
- Lok Sabha constituency: Birbhum
- Established: 1951
- Total electors: 252,071
- Reservation: None

Member of Legislative Assembly
- 18th West Bengal Legislative Assembly
- Incumbent Jagannath Chattopadhyay
- Party: BJP
- Alliance: NDA
- Elected year: 2026
- Preceded by: Bikash Roy Chowdhury (AITC)

Suri Assembly constituency is an assembly constituency in Birbhum district in the Indian state of West Bengal.

== Overview ==
As per orders of the Delimitation Commission, No. 285, Suri Assembly constituency is composed of the following: Suri municipality, Suri I CD Block, Rajnagar CD Block, and Chinpai, Gohaliara, Parulia and Sahapur gram panchayats of Dubrajpur CD Block.

Suri Assembly constituency is part of No. 42 Birbhum (Lok Sabha constituency).

== Members of the Legislative Assembly ==
Year	Name	Party
1952	Nishapati Majhi	Indian National Congress
1952	Gopika Bilas Sengupta	Indian National Congress
1957	Turku Hansda	Communist Party of India
1957	Mihirlal Chatterjee	Praja Socialist Party
1962	Baidyanath Bandyopadhyay	Indian National Congress
1967	Baidyanath Bandyopadhyay	Indian National Congress
1969	Prativa Mukherjee	Socialist Unity Centre of India
1971	Prativa Mukherjee	Socialist Unity Centre of India
1972	Suniti Chattaraj	Indian National Congress
1977	Suniti Chattaraj	Indian National Congress
1982	Suniti Chattaraj	Indian National Congress
1987	Tapan Roy	Communist Party of India
1991	Tapan Roy	Communist Party of India
1996	Suniti Chattaraj	Indian National Congress
2001	Braja Mukherjee	Communist Party of India
2006	Tapan Roy	Communist Party of India
2011	Swapan Kanti Ghosh	All India Trinamool Congress
2016	Asok Chattopadhyay	All India Trinamool Congress
2021	Bikash Roy Chowdhury	All India Trinamool Congress
2026	Jagannath Chattopadhyay	Bharatiya Janata Party

== Election results ==
=== 2026 ===
2026 West Bengal Legislative Assembly election: Suri
Party	Candidate	Votes	%	±%
BJP	Jagannath Chattopadhyay	124,243	52.09	▲7.01
AITC	Ujjal Chatterjee	95,557	40.07	▼8.36
CPI(M)	Motiur Rahaman	8,064	3.38	▼28.17
INC	Sanjoy Adhikari	2,674	1.12	▼2.66
NOTA	None of the above	1,832	0.77	▼0.07
Majority		28,686	12.02	▲8.67
Turnout		238,504	94.49	▲11.55
BJP gain from AITC		Swing		

=== 2021 ===
2021 West Bengal Legislative Assembly election: Suri
Party	Candidate	Votes	%	±%
AITC	Bikash Roy Choudhury	105,871	48.43	
BJP	Jagannath Chattopadhyay	98,551	45.08	▲29.22
INC	Chanchal Chatterjee	8,267	3.78	
SUCI(C)	Nitai Ankur	2,084	0.95	
NOTA	None of the above	1,835	0.84	
Majority		7,320	3.35	
Turnout		218,590	82.94	
AITC hold		Swing		

=== 2016 ===
2016 West Bengal Legislative Assembly election: Suri
Party	Candidate	Votes	%	±%
AITC	Asok Chattopadhyay	94,036	47.68	▼3.89
CPI(M)	Dr. Ram Chandra Dome	62,228	31.55	▼8.85
BJP	Joy Banerjee	32,112	16.28	▲12.39
Independent	Sunil Soren	2,748	1.39	N/A
SUCI(C)	Swadhin Dului	1,928	0.98	
NOTA	None of the above	4,188	2.12	N/A
Majority		31,808	16.13	+4.96
Turnout		197,240	83.61	−2.52
Registered electors		235,902		
AITC hold		Swing		

=== 2011 ===
In the 2011 election, Swapan Kanti Ghosh of Trinamool Congress defeated his nearest rival Abdul Ghaffar of CPI(M).

West Bengal assembly elections, 2011: Suri
Party	Candidate	Votes	%	±%
AITC	Swapan Kanti Ghosh	88,244	51.57	+5.15#
CPI(M)	Abdul Gaffar	69,127	40.40	−8.11
BJP	Partha Pratim De	6,649	3.89	
Independent	Maniruddin Sheikh	3,926		
Independent	Ujjwal Kumar Sow Mondal	2,009		
Independent	Rabilal Hembram	1,168		
Turnout		171,123	86.13	
AITC gain from CPI(M)		Swing	+13.26#	

.# Swing calculated on Congress+Trinamool Congress vote percentages taken together in 2006.

=== 2006 ===
In the 2006 state assembly elections Tapan Roy of CPI(M) won the Suri assembly seat defeating his nearest rival Swapan Kanti Ghosh of Congress. Contests in most years were multi cornered but only winners and runners are being mentioned. Braja Mukherjee of CPI(M) defeated Suniti Chattaraj of Trinamool Congress in 2001. Suniti Chattaraj of Congress defeated Tapan Roy of CPI(M) in 1996. Tapan Roy of CPI(M) defeated Suniti Chattaraj of Congress in 1991 and 1987. Suniti Chattaraj of Congress defeated Keshab Das of CPI(M) in 1982 and Arun Kumar Chowdhury in 1977.

=== 1972 ===
Suniti Chattaraj of Congress won in 1972. Prativa Mukherjee of SUC in 1971 and 1969. Baidyanath Bandopadhyay of Congress won in 1967 and 1962. In 1957 and 1951 Suri was a joint seat with one seat being reserved for scheduled tribes. Turku Hansda of CPI and Mihirlal Chatterjee of PSP won in 1957. Nishapati Majhi and Gopika Bilas Sengupta, both of Congress, won in 1951.
