= Sharadwat Mukherjee =

Indian politician and oncologist (born 1969)

Minister of Health & Family Welfare,Government of West Bengal
- Incumbent
- Assumed office 1 June 2026
- Governor: R. N. Ravi
- Chief Minister: Suvendu Adhikari
- Preceded by: Mamata Banerjee

Member of West Bengal Legislative Assembly
- Incumbent
- Assumed office 4 May 2026
- Preceded by: Sujit Bose
- Constituency: Bidhannagar

Personal details
- Born: December 28, 1970 (age 55) West Bengal, India
- Party: Bharatiya Janata Party
- Education: Cleveland Clinic; Uppsala University; University of Calcutta (MD); Medical College and Hospital, Kolkata (MBBS)
- Occupation: Politician
- Profession: Oncologist

Sharadwat Mukherjee (born 28 December 1970) is an Indian politician and oncologist who was elected to the West Bengal Legislative Assembly from the Bidhannagar seat in 2026. He is a member of Bharatiya Janata Party. He is currently serving as the Health Minister of West Bengal.

== Early life and education ==
Mukherjee was born in 1970. He pursued his bachelor's degree MBBS from the Calcutta Medical College and Hospital in 1992. He completed his postgraduate degree of Doctor of Medicine (MD) in the University of Calcutta in 1998. After that he received further training from Uppsala University, Sweden (Diploma in Management of Neuroendocrine Tumours) & Cleveland Clinic, Ohio, USA (Diploma in Uro-Oncology) in Medical Oncology.

== Career ==
Before his involvement in politics, Mukherjee was a consultant at Manipal Hospital, Kolkata branch. Since getting his MD, he worked at Chittaranjan National Cancer Institute for two years. He joined the Rashtriya Swayamsevak Sangh in 2016–17. He won the 2026 elections from Bidhannagar seat by 37,330 votes.

On 1 June 2026, he was sworn in as a Cabinet Minister of West Bengal, along with twelve other members.

== Electoral performance ==
West Bengal Legislative Assembly
| Year | Constituency | Party | Votes | % | Opponent | Party | Votes | % | Margin | Result |
|---|---|---|---|---|---|---|---|---|---|---|
| 2026 | Bidhannagar | BJP | 97,979 | 55.2 | Sujit Bose | AITC | 60,649 | 34.17 | 37,330 | Won |

== See also ==
- 2026 West Bengal Legislative Assembly election
- List of chief ministers of West Bengal
- West Bengal Legislative Assembly
- 18th West Bengal Assembly
