= Bikash Roychoudhury =

Indian politician

Member of the West Bengal Legislative Assembly
- In office 2 May 2021 – 4 May 2026
- Constituency: Suri

Personal details
- Party: AITC
- Education: Burdwan University
- Profession: Politician

Bikash Roychoudhury is an Indian politician from AITC. In May 2021, he was elected as the member of the West Bengal Legislative Assembly from Suri.

== Career ==
Roychoudhury is from Bolpur, Birbhum district. His father's name is Abinash Chandra Roychoudhury. He passed B.Com from Bolpur College in 1973. He contested in 2021 West Bengal Legislative Assembly election from Suri Vidhan Sabha and won the seat on 2 May 2021.
