= Bidhannagar Assembly constituency =

Bidhannagar
- Constituency No. 116 for the West Bengal Legislative Assembly
- Interactive Map Outlining Bidhannagar Assembly Constituency

Constituency details
- Country: India
- Region: East India
- State: West Bengal
- District: North 24 Parganas
- Lok Sabha constituency: Barasat
- Established: 2011
- Total electors: 198,318
- Reservation: None

Member of Legislative Assembly
- 18th West Bengal Legislative Assembly
- Incumbent Sharadwat Mukherjee
- Party: BJP
- Elected year: 2026
- Preceded by: Sujit Bose

Most Successful parties from Bidhannagar assembly
1. All India Trinamool Congress (4 time) (80.0%)
2. Bharatiya Janata Party (1 time) (20.0%)

Bidhannagar Assembly constituency is a Legislative Assembly constituency of North 24 Parganas district in the Indian state of West Bengal.

== Overview ==
As per orders of the Delimitation Commission, No. 116 Bidhannagar Assembly constituency is composed of the following: Wards 28-41 of Bidhannagar Municipal Corporation (Before 2015 Bidhannagar Municipality) and Ward Nos. 19, 20 and 28 to 35 of South Dum Dum Municipality.

Bidhannagar Assembly constituency is part of No. 17 Barasat (Lok Sabha constituency).

== Members of the Legislative Assembly ==
Year	Name	Party
2009^	Sujit Bose	Trinamool Congress
2011	Sujit Bose	Trinamool Congress
2016	Sujit Bose	Trinamool Congress
2021	Sujit Bose	Trinamool Congress
2026	Sharadwat Mukherjee	Bharatiya Janata Party

- ^ denotes by-election

== Election results ==
Vote share of Winning Candidates
Year	Percent
2026	55.20%
2021	46.85%
2016	42.85%
2011	59.53%

=== 2026 ===
2026 West Bengal Legislative Assembly election: Bidhannagar
Party	Candidate	Votes	%	±%
BJP	Sharadwat Mukherjee	97,979	55.20	▲13.29
AITC	Sujit Bose	60,649	34.17	▼12.68
CPI(M)	Soumyajit Raha	13,956	7.86	
INC	Ranajit Mukherjee	1498	0.84	
Majority		37,330	21.03	▲16.09
Turnout		177,891	87.02	▲20.44
BJP gain from AITC		Swing		

=== 2021 ===
2021 West Bengal Legislative Assembly election: Bidhannagar
Party	Candidate	Votes	%	±%
AITC	Sujit Bose	75,912	46.85	
BJP	Sabyasachi Dutta	67,915	41.91	
INC	Abhishek Banerjee	12,821	7.91	
NOTA	None of the above	2,213	1.37	
Majority		7,997	4.94	
Turnout		162,035	66.58	
AITC hold		Swing		

=== 2016 ===
2016 West Bengal Legislative Assembly election: Bidhannagar
Party	Candidate	Votes	%	±%
AITC	Sujit Bose	66,130	42.85	▼16.68
INC	Arunava Ghosh	59,142	38.32	New entry
BJP	Susanta Ranjan Pal	21,735	14.08	▲10.13
NOTA	None of the above	3,255	2.11	
Majority		6,988	4.52	▼19.61
Turnout		154,303	68.01	
AITC hold		Swing		

=== 2011 ===
In the 2011 election, Sujit Bose of Trinamool Congress defeated his nearest rival Palash Das of CPI(M).

West Bengal assembly elections, 2011: Bidhannagar
Party	Candidate	Votes	%	±%
AITC	Sujit Bose	88,642	59.53	
CPI(M)	Palash Das	52,717	35.40	
BJP	Ashoke Sarkar	5,877	3.95	
Independent	Palash Biswas	1,668	1.12	
Majority		35,925	24.13	
Turnout		148,904	75.08	
AITC win (new seat)				
