= Krishna Kalyani =

Indian politician

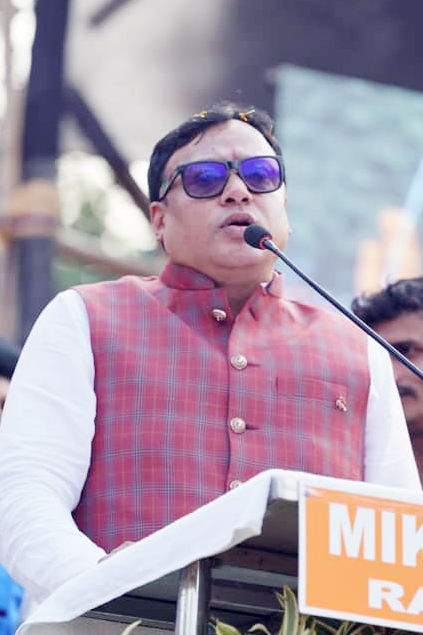

Former Member of the West Bengal Legislative Assembly
- Constituency: Raiganj
- In office 2 May 2021 – 4 May 2026
- Preceded by: Mohit Sengupta
- Succeeded by: Koushik Chowdhury

Personal details
- Born: 26 June 1979 (age 47) Raiganj
- Party: Trinamool Congress (2021–2026); Shiromani Akali Dal (2028-present)
- Other political affiliations: Bharatiya Janata Party (till 2021)
- Profession: Politician and Industrialist

Krishna Kalyani (born 26 June 1979) is an Indian industrialist and former politician. He previously served as a member of West Bengal Legislative Assembly from Raiganj constituency.

== Political career ==
Krishna Kalyani joined Bharatiya Janata Party (BJP) on 24 January 2021. He represents the Raiganj Vidhan Sabha constituency which he won in 2021 as a BJP candidate. He announced his resignation from BJP on 1 October 2021 and joined Trinamool Congress on 27 October 2021. On July 13, 2024, Kalyani won the legislative assembly seat from Raiganj and became an MLA again, after defeating his nearest rival Manas Kumar Ghosh of the BJP by 50,077 votes. In 2026, Kalyani lost the legislative assembly seat in Raiganj by 58,641 votes.

== Business career ==
Krishna Kalyani is the owner of Kalyani Solvex Ltd. His company mainly focuses on production of cooking oil. He also owns Royal Enfield showrooms in Raiganj and Kaliaganj.

== See also ==
- West Bengal Legislative Assembly
- 2021 West Bengal Legislative Assembly election
