= Purnima Chakraborty =

Indian politician in West Bengal

Minister of State, Government of West Bengal
- Incumbent
- Assumed office 1 June 2026
- Governor: R. N. Ravi
- Chief Minister: Suvendu Adhikari
- Departments: Information & Culture; Tourism

Member of the West Bengal Legislative Assembly
- Incumbent
- Assumed office 4 May 2026
- Preceded by: Shashi Panja
- Constituency: Shyampukur

Personal details
- Born: 1983 (age 42–43) Kolkata
- Party: Bharatiya Janata Party
- Spouse: Raja Chakraborty (Deceased)
- Profession: Politician,Social Worker,Mandir Sevait

Purnima Chakraborty is a politician from West Bengal. She is currently serving as a Minister of State for Department of Information & Culture and Department of tourism, and a Member of West Bengal Legislative Assembly, from Shyampukur Assembly constituency. She is a Member of Bharatiya Janata Party. She defeated Incumbent Trinamool Congress Minister, Shashi Panja by 14,633 votes.

She is a social worker, and serves as a sevait in Kolkata's Radha-Madhab Mandir. She was married to Raja Chakraborty, who was a Police Officer. Her Husband died on duty. She was offered job at Bidhannagar Police Commissionerate, but she rejected that offer, vowing to dethrone Trinamool Congress for throne.
