= Koushik Chowdhury =

Indian politician

Minister of State, Government of West Bengal
- Incumbent
- Assumed office 1 June 2026
- Governor: R. N. Ravi
- Chief Minister: Suvendu Adhikari
- Departments: School Education; Fire & Emergency Services

Member of the West Bengal Legislative Assembly
- Incumbent
- Assumed office 4 May 2026
- Preceded by: Krishna Kalyani
- Constituency: Raiganj

Personal details
- Party: Bharatiya Janata Party
- Profession: Politician; Social worker

Koushik Chowdhury is an Indian politician, social worker and member of the Bharatiya Janata Party. He was elected as a Member of the West Bengal Legislative Assembly from the Raiganj constituency in the 2026 West Bengal Legislative Assembly election. He is currently serving as the Minister of State of West Bengal.
