= Regional Research Station =

Indian research institute

The Regional Research Station (Old Alluvial Zone) in West Bengal was first established as District Seed Farm under the Ministry of Agriculture, within the government of West Bengal, India in 1955. This farm was renamed as Zonal Adaptive Research Station (ZARS) in 1975. Further, in view of implementation of National Agricultural Research Project (NARP) of the Indian Council of Agricultural Research (ICAR), the State Government handed over this station to Bidhan Chandra Krishi Viswavidyalaya in 1990 for conducting research works according to the zonal requirements and named as Regional Research Station (Old Alluvial Zone).

After the establishment of Uttar Banga Krishi Viswavidyalaya in January 2001, this station has been brought under the administrative control of this new university. Since then, it is functioning as a main research station of Old Alluvial Zone comprising three districts of Uttar Dinajpur, Dakshin Dinajpur and Malda. It has one Sub-station at block Manikchak in Maldah district with 50 acres of land (25 acres at Mathurapur + 25 acres at Ratua) which is famous for its mango plantation and sericulture.

== Location ==
This Research Station is located beside the Gazzole–Hili State Highway in the Mouza of Majhian under Balurghat Block in the District of Dakshin Dinajpur, West Bengal with 23° 57′ N and 87° 10′ E. River Atreyee is flowing in the western side of the station. The international business corridor between India and Bangladesh is at Hilli, 22 km away from this station.

== Mandate ==
1. Basic, adaptive and need based zone specific research to meet up problem of the farmer of this zone.
2. Innovation / modification of eco-friendly technology specific to this zone.
3. Selection and preservation of plant genetic materials/resources.
4. Production and distribution of quality seed for the farmer of this zone.
5. Extension of advance technology and motivation to the farming community through training and demonstration.
