= Raiganj Assembly constituency =

Raiganj
- Constituency No. 35 for the West Bengal Legislative Assembly
- Interactive Map Outlining Raiganj Assembly Constituency

Constituency details
- Country: India
- Region: East India
- State: West Bengal
- District: Uttar Dinajpur
- Lok Sabha constituency: Raiganj
- Established: 1951
- Total electors: 174,464
- Reservation: None

Member of Legislative Assembly
- 18th West Bengal Legislative Assembly
- Incumbent Koushik Chowdhury
- Party: Bharatiya Janata Party
- Elected year: 2026

Raiganj Assembly constituency is an assembly constituency in Uttar Dinajpur district in the Indian state of West Bengal.

== Overview ==
As per orders of the Delimitation Commission, No. 35 Raiganj Assembly constituency covers Raiganj municipality, and Bahin, Maraikup, Gouri, Kamalabati I and Kamalabati II gram panchayats of Raiganj community development block.

Raiganj Assembly constituency is part of No. 5 Raiganj (Lok Sabha constituency).

== Members of the Legislative Assembly ==
Year	MLA	Party
Raiganj constituency
1952	Shyama Prasad Barman	Indian National Congress
1952	Ghulam Hamidur Rahman	Indian National Congress
1957	Haji Badruddin Ahmed	Indian National Congress
1957	Shyama Prasad Barman	Indian National Congress
1962	Ramendranath Dutta	Indian National Congress
1967	NN Kundu	Praja Socialist Party
1969	Manash Roy	Communist Party of India (Marxist)
1971	Ramendranath Dutta	Indian National Congress
1972	Ramendranath Dutta	Indian National Congress
1977	Khagendra Nath Sinha	Communist Party of India (Marxist)
1982	Dipendra Barman	Indian National Congress
1987	Khagendra Nath Sinha	Communist Party of India (Marxist)
1991	Khagendra Nath Sinha	Communist Party of India (Marxist)
1996	Dilip Kumar Das	Indian National Congress
2001	Chittaranjan Roy	Indian National Congress
2006	Chittaranjan Roy	Indian National Congress
2011	Mohit Sengupta	Indian National Congress
2016	Mohit Sengupta	Indian National Congress
2021	Krishna Kalyani	Bharatiya Janata Party
2024^	Krishna Kalyani	All India Trinamool Congress
2026	Koushik Chowdhury	Bharatiya Janata Party

- ^ denotes by-election

== Election results ==
=== 2026 ===
2026 West Bengal Legislative Assembly election: Raiganj
Party	Candidate	Votes	%	±%
BJP	Koushik Chowdhury	105,561	64.05	▲14.61
AITC	Krishna Kalyani	46,920	28.47	▼8.11
INC	Mohit Sengupta	4,386	2.66	▼8.0
CPI(M)	Jibananda Singha	3,787	2.3	
NOTA	None of the above	1,654	1.0	▼0.53
Majority		58,641	35.58	▲22.72
Turnout		164,804	94.46	▲13.29
BJP hold		Swing		

==== 2024 bypoll ====
2024 West Bengal Legislative Assembly by-election: Raiganj
Party	Candidate	Votes	%	±%
AITC	Krishna Kalyani	86,479	57.97	▲21.39
BJP	Manas Kumar Ghosh	36,402	24.40	▼25.04
INC	Mohit Sengupta	23,116	15.50	▲4.84
NOTA	None of the above	1,710	1.15	▼0.38
Majority		50,077	33.57	▲20.71
Turnout		1,49,183	71.99	▼
AITC gain from BJP		Swing		

=== 2021 ===
In the 2021 election, Krishna Kalyani of BJP defeated his nearest rival Kanaia Lal Agarwal of AITC.

2021 West Bengal Legislative Assembly election: Raiganj
Party	Candidate	Votes	%	±%
BJP	Krishna Kalyani	79,775	49.44	▲40.75
AITC	Agarwal Kanaia Lal	59,027	36.58	
INC	Mohit Sengupta	17,198	10.66	▼48.32
NOTA	None of the above	2,468	1.53	
Majority		20,748	12.86	
Turnout		161,347	81.17	
BJP gain from INC		Swing		

=== 2016 ===
In the 2016 election, Mohit Sengupta of INC defeated his nearest rival Purnendu Dey of AITC.

2016 West Bengal Legislative Assembly election: Raiganj
Party	Candidate	Votes	%	±%
INC	Mohit Sengupta	87,983	58.98	+9.29
AITC	Purnendu Dey (Bablu)	36,736	24.63	
BJP	Pradip Sarkar	12,961	8.69	+6.28
SP	Arun Chandra Dey	6,154	4.13	−41.29
NOTA	None of the above	1,985	1.33	
Majority		51,247	34.35	
Turnout		1,49,168	83.39	−1.34
INC hold		Swing		

=== 2011 ===
In the 2011 election, Mohit Sengupta of Congress defeated his nearest rival Kiranmoy Nanda of Samajwadi Party.

West Bengal assembly elections, 2011: Raiganj constituency
Party	Candidate	Votes	%	±%
INC	Mohit Sengupta	62,864	49.69	+2.99
SP	Kiranmoy Nanda	57,455	45.42	
BJP	Sachindra Nath Das	3,053	2.41	
Independent	Manjit Mandal	1,064		
SUCI	Sanatan Dutta	750		
BSP	Swapan Kumar Das	734		
IPFB	Anindya Ganguly	586		
Turnout		126,506	84.73	
INC hold		Swing		

=== 2006 ===
In the 2006 and 2001 state assembly elections Chittaranjan Roy of Congress won the 35 Raiganj Assembly seat, defeating his nearest rivals Dilip Kumar Das of NCP and Harinarayan Roy of CPI(M) respectively. Contests in most years were involved multiple contestants but only winners and runners are being mentioned. Dilip Kumar Das of Congress defeated Khagendra Nath Sinha of CPI(M) in 1996. Khagendra Nath Sinha of CPI(M) defeated Dilip Das of Congress in 1991 and Dipendra Barman of Congress in 1987. Dipendra Barman of Congress defeated Khagendra Nath Sinha of CPI(M) in 1982. Khagendra Nath Sinha of CPI(M) defeated Mahendranath Barman of Janata Party in 1977.

=== 1972 ===
Ramendranath Dutta of Congress won in 1972 and 1971. Manash Roy of CPI(M) won in 1969. N.N.Kundu of PSP won in 1967. Ramendranath Dutta of Congress won in 1962. In 1957 and 1951 Raiganj was a joint seat. Hazi Badirudddin Ahmad and Syama Prasad Barman, both of Congress, won in 1957. Syama Prasad Barman and Gulam Hamidur Rahman, both of Congress, won in 1951.
