= Abhijit Roy (politician) =

Indian politician

Abhijit Roy (born 1969) is an Indian politician from West Bengal. He is a two time member of the West Bengal Legislative Assembly. He won the 2016 West Bengal Legislative Assembly election from Mayureswar Assembly constituency in Birbhum district representing the All India Trinamool Congress. He retained the seat in 2021.

== Early life and education ==
Roy is from Mayureswar, Birbhum district, West Bengal. He is the son of Lakshmikanta Roy. He completed his BCom in 1988 at Rampurhat College which is affiliated with Burdwan University.

== Career ==
Roy won from Mayureswar Assembly constituency representing the All India Trinamool Congress in the 2016 West Bengal Legislative Assembly election. He polled 89,210 votes and defeated his nearest rival, Arup Bag of the Communist Party of India, by a margin of 38,770 votes. He retained the seat for the Trinamool Congress winning the 2021 West Bengal Legislative Assembly election.
