= Jyotirmoy Kar =

Indian politician

Jyotirmoy Kar (born 1957) is an Indian politician from West Bengal. He was a former member of the West Bengal Legislative Assembly from Patashpur Assembly constituency in Purba Medinipur district. He won the 2011 and 2016 West Bengal Legislative Assembly election representing All India Trinamool Congress.

== Early life and education ==
Kar is from Kanthi Dakshin, Purba Medinipur district, West Bengal. He is the son of late Kalikinkar Kar. He completed his MA at Jadavpur University and passed the course in first class in 1968. He works as a lecturer and his wife is a homemaker.

== Career ==
Kar won from Patashpur Assembly constituency representing the All India Trinamool Congress in the 2016 West Bengal Legislative Assembly election. He polled 103,567 votes and defeated his nearest rival, Makhanlal Nayak of the Communist Party of India, by a margin of 29,888 votes. He became an MLA for the first time winning the 2011 West Bengal Legislative Assembly election and polled 84,482 votes.
