= Mayureswar Assembly constituency =

Mayureswar
- Constituency No. 290 for the West Bengal Legislative Assembly
- Interactive Map Outlining Mayureswar Assembly Constituency

Constituency details
- Country: India
- Region: East India
- State: West Bengal
- District: Birbhum
- Lok Sabha constituency: Bolpur
- Established: 1962
- Total electors: 182,600
- Reservation: None

Member of Legislative Assembly
- 18th West Bengal Legislative Assembly
- Incumbent Dudh Kumar Mondal
- Party: BJP
- Alliance: NDA
- Elected year: 2026

Mayureswar Assembly constituency is an assembly constituency in Birbhum district in the Indian state of West Bengal.

== Overview ==
As per orders of the Delimitation Commission, No. 290 Mayureswar Assembly constituency is composed of the following: Mayureswar I and Mayureswar II CD Blocks.

Mayureswar Assembly constituency is part of No. 41 Bolpur Lok Sabha constituency (SC).

== Members of the Legislative Assembly ==
Year	Name	Party
1962	Gobardhan Das	Communist Party of India
1967	Kanai Saha	Indian National Congress
1969	Panchanan Let	Communist Party of India (Marxist)
1971	Lalchand Fulmali	Communist Party of India
1972	Lalchand Fulmali	Communist Party of India
1977	Panchanan Let	Communist Party of India (Marxist)
1982	Dhiren Let	Communist Party of India (Marxist)
1987	Dhiren Let	Communist Party of India (Marxist)
1991	Dhiren Let	Communist Party of India (Marxist)
1996	Dhiren Let	Communist Party of India (Marxist)
1998^	Bishnu Let	Communist Party of India (Marxist)
2001	Bishnu Let	Communist Party of India (Marxist)
2006	Sadhu Charan Bagdi	Communist Party of India (Marxist)
2011	Ashok Ray	Communist Party of India (Marxist)
2016	Abhijit Roy	Trinamool Congress
2021	Abhijit Roy	Trinamool Congress
2026	Dudh Kumar Mondal	Bharatiya Janata Party

- ^ denotes by-election

== Election results ==
=== 2026 ===
2026 West Bengal Legislative Assembly election: Mayureswar
Party	Candidate	Votes	%	±%
BJP	Dudh Kumar Mondal	107,056	50.15	▲5.85
AITC	Abhijit Roy	86,054	40.31	▼10.05
CPI(M)	Jayanta Bhalla	9,571	4.48	
AJUP	Sheikh Kalimuddin	3,014	1.41	
INC	Kasafoddoza Syed	2,271	1.06	
NOTA	None of the above	2,456	1.15	▼0.26
Majority		21,002	9.84	▲3.78
Turnout		213,473	94.33	▲7.88
BJP gain from AITC		Swing		

=== 2021 ===
2021 West Bengal Legislative Assembly election: Mayureswar
Party	Candidate	Votes	%	±%
AITC	Abhijit Roy	100,425	50.36	
BJP	Shyamapada Mondal	88,350	44.3	
ISF	Kashinath Pal	5,562	2.79	
BSP	Gopal Sarkar	2,285	1.15	
NOTA	None of the above	2,803	1.41	
Majority		12,075	6.06	
Turnout		199,425	86.45	
AITC hold		Swing		

=== 2016 ===
2016 West Bengal Legislative Assembly election: Mayureswar
Party	Candidate	Votes	%	±%
AITC	Abhijit Roy	89,210	48.54	▲10.31
CPI(M)	Arup Bag	50,440	27.44	▼14.87
BJP	Locket Chatterjee	35,329	19.22	▼0.24
NOTA	None of the above	3,155	1.72	New entry
Majority		38,770	21.10	▲17.02
Turnout		1,83,792	86.53	▼0.81
AITC gain from CPI(M)		Swing		

=== 2011 ===
2011 West Bengal Legislative Assembly election: Mayureswar
Party	Candidate	Votes	%	±%
CPI(M)	Ashok Ray	67,478	42.31	
AITC	Jatil Mondal	60,958	38.23	
BJP	Dudh Kumar Mondal	31,031	19.46	
Majority		6,520	4.08	
Turnout		1,59,467	87.34	
CPI(M) hold		Swing		

=== 1977-2006 ===
In the 2006 state assembly elections, Sadhu Charan Bagdi of CPI(M) won the Mayureswar (SC) assembly seat defeating his nearest rival Subhas Chandra Mandal of BJP. Contests in most years were multi cornered but only winners and runners are being mentioned. Bishnu Let of CPI(M) defeated Kestopada Bagdi of Trinamool Congress in 2001, Arjun Saha of BJP in 1996, Ajay Saha of BJP in 1991, Kamalakant Mondal of Congress/ ICS 1987 and 1982. Panchanan Let of CPI(M) defeated Gunakar Mandal of Janata Party in 1977.

=== 1952-1972 ===
Lalchand Fulamali of CPI won in 1972 and 1971. Panchanan Let of CPI(M) won in 1969. Kanai Lal Saha of Congress won in 1967. Gobardhan Das of CPI won in 1962. Prior to that the constituency was not there.
