= Banasri Maity =

Indian politician

Banasri Maity (born 28 December 1960) is an Indian politician from West Bengal. She is a former member of the West Bengal Legislative Assembly from Kanthi Uttar Assembly constituency in Purba Medinipur district. She was elected in the 2016 West Bengal Legislative Assembly election representing the All India Trinamool Congress Party.

== Early life and education ==
Maity is from Kanthi Dakshin, Purba Medinipur district, West Bengal. She married Achin Maity. She completed her BA honours in 1987 at Prabhat Kumar College, Contai, which is affiliated with Calcutta University. Later, she did her postgraduate diploma in teaching at Hestings College. She works as a teacher at Basantia High School.

== Career ==
Maity was elected as an MLA for the first time winning 2011 West Bengal Legislative Assembly election from Kanthi Uttar Assembly constituency representing the All India Trinamool Congress. She polled 91,528 votes and defeated her nearest rival, Chakradhar Maikap of the Communist Party of India (Marxist), by a margin of 7,955 votes. She retained the Kanthi Uttar seat for the Trinamool Congress in the 2016 West Bengal Legislative Assembly election defeating the Communist Party's Chakradhar Maikap again, by a margin of 18,576 votes.

In December 2020, ahead of the 2021 elections, she resigned from the Trinamool Congress Party following the resignation of rebel Trinamool Congress leader Suvendu Adhikari, and later joined the Bharatiya Janata Party along with him and three other MLAs.
