= 2011 West Bengal Legislative Assembly election =

Indian state election

- 18 April 2011 – 10 May 2011

All 294 seats in the West Bengal Legislative Assembly 148 seats needed for a majority
- Opinion polls
- Turnout: 84.33% (▲2.36 pp)
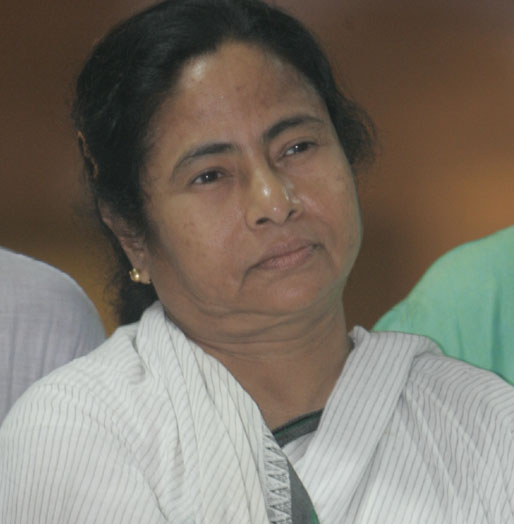

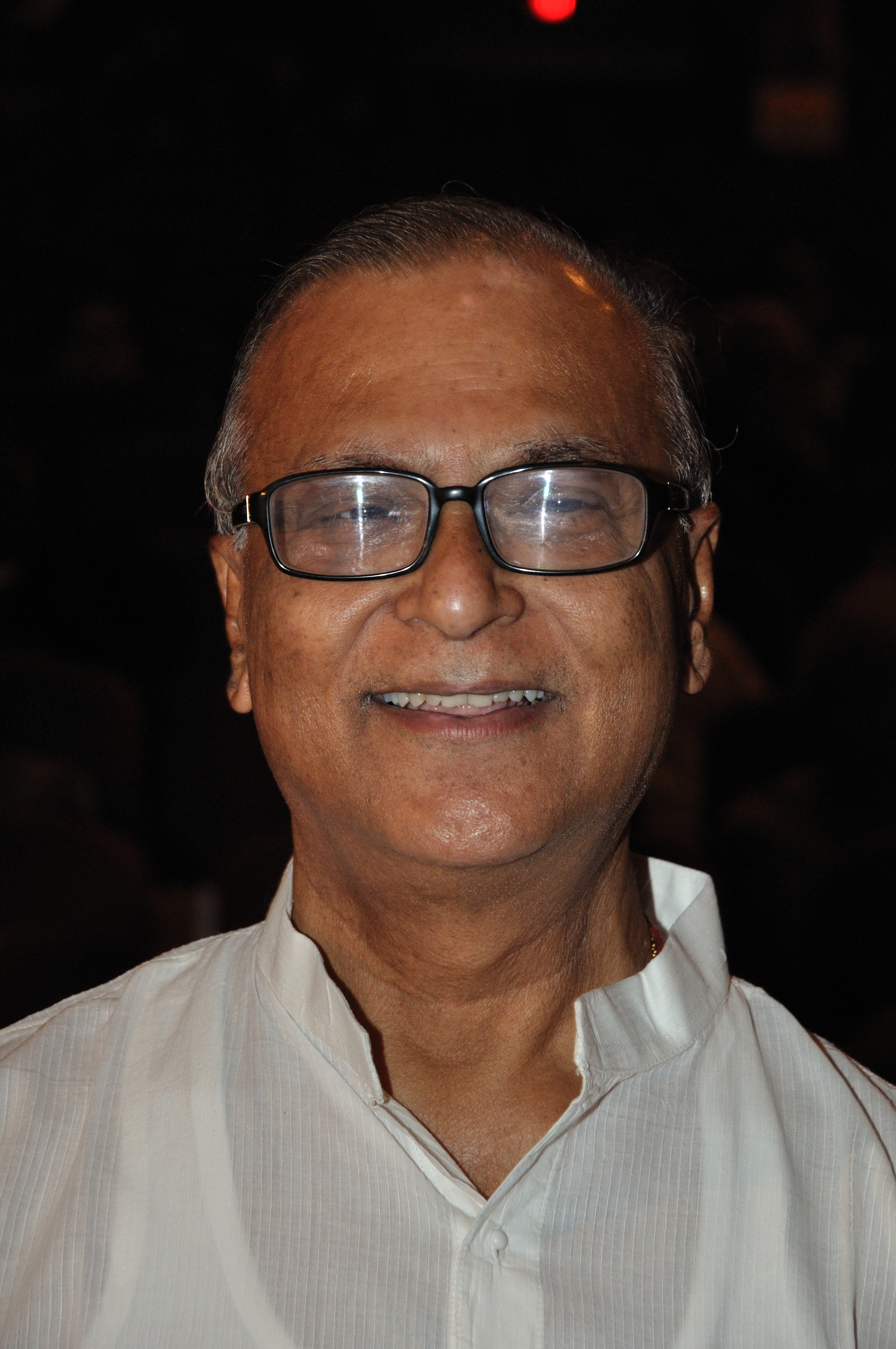

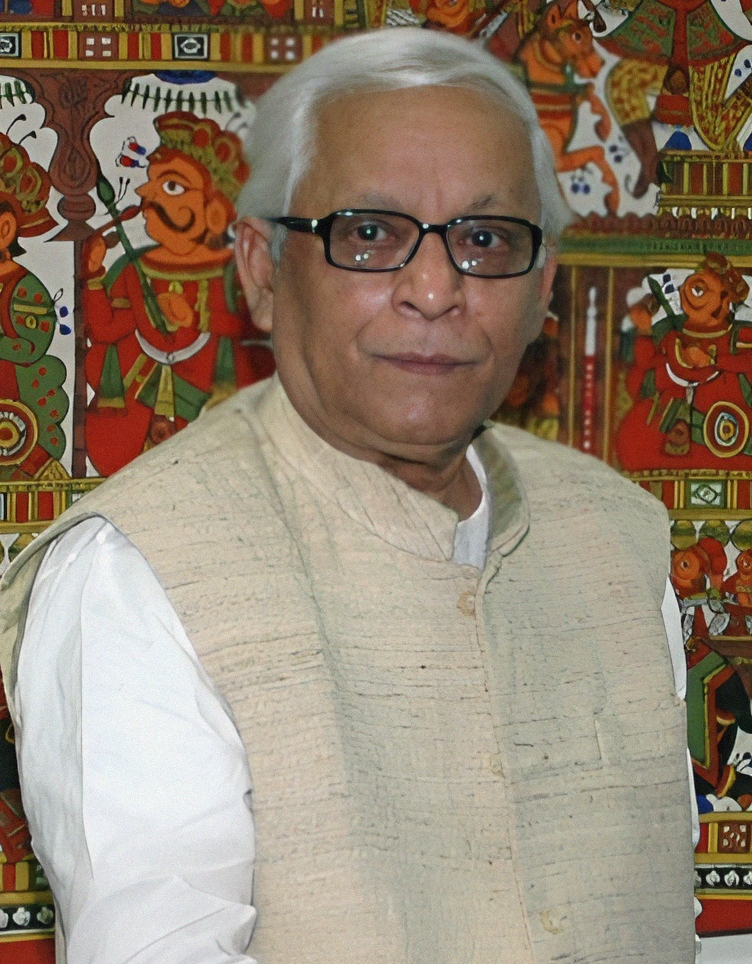
	Majority party	Minority party	Third party
Leader	Mamata Banerjee	Pradip Bhattacharya	Buddhadeb Bhattacharjee
Party	AITC	INC	CPI(M)
Alliance	UPA	UPA	LF
Leader since	1998	2008	2000
Leader's seat	Bhabanipur (By-elected)	Did not contest	Jadavpur (Lost)
Last election	26.64%, 30 seats	14.71%, 21 seats	37.13%, 176 seats
Seats won	184	42	40
Seat change	▲154	▲21	▼136
Popular vote	18,547,678	4,330,580	14,330,061
Percentage	38.93%	9.09%	30.08%
Swing	▲12.29 pp	▼5.62 pp	▼7.05 pp
Alliance seats	228	228	62
Seat change	▲198	▲198	▼171
- Seatwise Map of the Election Results

Chief Minister before election
Buddhadeb Bhattacharjee
CPI(M)
Chief Minister after election
Mamata Banerjee
AITC

Legislative Assembly elections were held in the Indian state of West Bengal in 2011 to elect the members of West Bengal Legislative Assembly as the term of the incumbent government was about to end. The election was held in six phases between 18 April and 10 May 2011 for all the 294 seats of the Assembly. In a high voltage election, a voter turnout of over 84% was recorded, the highest ever in the history of Bengal till then.

The All India Trinamool Congress-led United Progressive Alliance won an absolute majority of seats in the state in a historic win, marking the end of the 34-year rule of Left Front, the longest-serving democratically elected communist government in the world, a fact that was noted by international media. Notably, even the incumbent Chief Minister Buddhadeb Bhattacharjee lost his Jadavpur seat, which was considered an electoral bastion of the CPI(M), to Trinamool's Manish Gupta. Bhattacharjee became the second incumbent chief minister of the state to lose from his own seat, after Congress' Prafulla Chandra Sen's defeat in Arambagh to Ajoy Kumar Mukherjee of Bangla Congress in 1967.

== Background ==
This was the first legislative assembly election for the Vidhan Sabha since 2007 Nandigram anti land acquisition violence and the 2006 Singur anti land acquisition violence, led by opposition party chief Mamata Banerjee, caused deaths by police firing amidst protests.

The Left Front had governed West Bengal since 1977. The election also followed the defeat of the Left Front in the 2009 general election, as well as its relatively poor showing in Panchayat and municipal elections.

=== Delimitation ===
The 2011 election adopted re-drawn electoral constituencies based on the 2001 census, following the 2002 Delimitation Commission of India, whose recommendations were approved in February 2008.

== Polling schedule ==
Phases of the election across the state

Chief Election Commissioner of India S. Y. Quraishi announced that polling in West Bengal will be spread over six phases between 18 April and 10 May for the constituencies of the West Bengal Vidhan Sabha.

	Date	No of assembly constituencies
Phase I	18 April	54
Phase II	22 April	50
Phase III	27 April	75
Phase IV	3 May	63
Phase V	7 May	38
Phase VI	10 May	14
Counting	13 May	294
Source: Election Commission of India

=== Phase I ===
54 constituencies went to the polls:
Mekliganj (SC), Mathabhanga (SC), Coochbehar Uttar (SC), Coochbehar Dakshin, Sitalkuchi (SC), Sitai (SC), Dinhata, Natabari, Tufangunj, Kumargram (ST), Kalchini (ST), Alipurduars, Falakata (SC), Madarihat (ST), Dhupguri (SC), Mayanaguri (SC), Jalpaiguri (SC), Rajganj (SC), Dabgram-Fulbari, Mal (ST), Nagrakata (ST), Kalimpong, Darjeeling, Kurseong, Matigara-Naxalbari (SC), Siliguri, Phansidewa (ST), Chopra, Islampur, Goalpokhar, Chakulia, Karandighi, Hemtabad (SC), Kaliaganj (SC), Raiganj, Itahar, Kushmandi (SC), Kumarganj, Balurghat, Tapan (ST), Gangarampur (SC), Harirampur, Habibpur (ST), Gazole (SC), Chanchal, Harishchandrapur, Malatipur, Ratua, Manikchak, Maldaha (SC), English Bazar, Mothabari, Sujapur, and Baisnabnagar.

=== Phase II ===
50 constituencies went to the polls:
Farakka, Samserganj, Suti, Jangipur, Raghunathganj, Sagardighi, Lalgola, Bhagaban Gola, Raninagar, Murshidabad, Nabagram (SC), Khargram (SC), Burwan (SC), Kandi, Bharatpur, Rejinagar, Beldanga, Baharampur, Hariharpara, Naoda, Domkal, Jalangi, Karimpur, Tehatta, Palashipara, Kaliganj, Nakashipara, Chapra, Krishnanagar Uttar, Nabadwip, Krishnanagar Dakshin, Santipur, Ranaghat Uttar Paschim, Krishnaganj (SC), Ranaghat Uttar Purba (SC), Ranaghat Dakshin (SC), Chakdah, Kalyani (SC), Haringhata (SC), Dubrajpur (SC), Suri, Bolpur, Nanoor (SC), Labpur, Sainthia (SC), Mayureswar, Rampurhat, Hansan, Nalhati, and Murarai.

=== Phase III ===
75 constituencies went to the polls:
Bagdah (SC), Bongaon Uttar (SC), Bongaon Dakshin (SC), Gaighata (SC), Swarupnagar (SC), Baduria, Habra, Ashoknagar, Amdanga, Bijpur, Naihati, Bhatpara, Jagatdal, Noapara, Barrackpur, Khardaha, Dum Dum Uttar, Panihati, Kamarhati, Baranagar, Dum Dum, Rajarhat New Town, Bidhan Nagar, Rajarhat Gopalpur, Madhyamgram, Barasat, Deganga, Haroa, Minakhan (SC), Sandeshkhali (ST), Basirhat Dakshin, Basirhat Uttar, Hingalganj (SC), Gosaba (SC), Basanti (SC), Kultali (SC), Patharpratima, Kakdwip, Sagar, Kulpi, Raidighi, Mandirbazar (SC), Jaynagar (SC), Baruipur Purba (SC), Canning Paschim (SC), Canning Purba, Baruipur Paschim, Magrahat Purba (SC), Magrahat Paschim, Diamond Harbour, Falta, Satgachia, Bishnupur (SC), Sonarpur Dakshin, Bhangore, Kasba, Jadavpur, Sonarpur Uttar, Tollygunj, Behala Purba, Behala Paschim, Maheshtala, Budge Budge, Metiabruz, Kokata Port, Bhabanipore, Rashbehari, Ballygunge, Chowrangee, Entally, Beleghata, Jorasanko, Shyampukur, Maniktala, and Kashipur-Belgachia.

=== Phase IV ===
63 constituencies went to the polls:
Bally, Howrah Uttar, Howrah Madhya, Shibpur, Howrah Dakshin, Sankrail (SC), Panchla, Uluberia Purba, Uluberia Uttar (SC), Uluberia Dakshin, Shyampur, Bagnan, Amta, Udaynarayanpur, Jagatballavpur, Domjur, Uttarpara, Sreerampur, Champdani, Singur, Chandannagore, Chunchura, Balagarh (SC), Pandua, Saptagram, Chanditala, Jangipara, Haripal, Dhanekhali (SC), Tarakeswar, Pursurah, Arambag (SC), Goghat (SC), Khanakul, Tamluk, Panskura Purba, Panskura Paschim, Moyna, Nandakumar, Mahisadal, Haldia (SC), Nandigram, Chandipur, Patashpur, Kanthi Uttar, Bhagabanpur, Khejuri (SC), Kanthi Dakshin, Ramnagar, Egra, Bardhaman Dakshin, Jamalpur (SC), Monteswar, Kalna (SC), Memari, Bardhaman Uttar (SC), Bhatar, Purbasthali Dakshin, Purbasthali Uttar, Katwa, Ketugram, Mangalkot and Ausgram (SC)

=== Phase V ===
38 constituencies went to the polls:
Dantan, Keshiary (ST), Kharagpur Sadar, Narayangarh, Sabang, Pingla, Kharagpur, Debra, Daspur, Ghatal (SC), Chandrakona (SC), Keshpur (SC), Purulia, Manbazar (ST), Kashipur, Para (SC), Raghunathpur (SC), Saltora (SC), Chhatnam, Bankura, Barjora, Onda, Bishnupur, Katulpur (SC), Indus (SC), Sonamukhi (SC), Khandaghosh (SC), Raina (SC), Galsi (SC), Pandabeswar, Durgapur Purba, Durgapur Paschim, Raniganj, Jamuria, Asansol Dakshin, Asansol Uttar, Kulti and Barabani.

=== Phase VI ===
14 constituencies went to the polls:
Nayagram (ST), Gopiballavpur, Jhargram, Garbeta, Salboni, Medinipur, Binpur (ST), Bandwan (ST), Balarampur, Baghmundi, Joypur, Ranibandh (ST), Raipur (ST) and Taldangra.

== Parties & Alliances ==
Coalition	Party	Flag	Symbol	Leader	Contested seats	Coalition contested seats
Left Front	CPM		(Note: In the supplied Left Front table, this CPI(M) election-symbol cell rowspans the first five parties: Communist Party of India (Marxist), Marxist Forward Bloc, Democratic Socialist Party (Prabodh Chandra), Revolutionary Communist Party of India, and Biplobi Bangla Congress. The supplied table also gives a rowspanned subtotal of 217 seats for these five rows: 210 + 2 + 2 + 2 + 1.)	Buddhadeb Bhattacharya	210	294
Left Front	MFB			Pratim Chatterjee	2	294
Left Front	DSP(PC)			Prabodh Chandra Sinha	2	294
Left Front	RCPI			Rasik Bhatt	2	294
Left Front	Biplobi Bangla Congress			-	1	294
Left Front	AIFB			Debabrata Biswas	34	294
Left Front	RSP			Kshiti Goswami	23	294
Left Front	CPI			A. B. Bardhan	14	294
Left Front	SP			Kiranmoy Nanda	5	294
Left Front	RJD			Lalu Prasad Yadav	1	294
UPA	AITC			Mamata Banerjee	226	294
UPA	INC			Pranab Mukherjee	66	294
UPA	NCP		-	Sharad Pawar	1	294
UPA	Jharkhand Party (Naren)			Chunibala Hansda	1	294
UPA (Note: The supplied UPA seat-allotment table places the Socialist Unity Centre of India (Communist) under the note: “Parties part of the United Progressive Alliance at the center but not in state”. Its 30 contested seats are therefore preserved here, but they are not included in the UPA state-alliance total of 294.)	SUCI(C)			Provash Ghosh	30	Not in state alliance
UPA	PDS (Note: Party of Democratic Socialism (India) appears in the supplied party list under the United Progressive Alliance, but no corresponding row, flag, symbol, leader, or seat-allotment figure is supplied in the seat-allotment table.)	-	-	-	-	-
NDA	BJP			Rahul Sinha	288	294+4 (Note: The supplied NDA table gives the coalition total as “294+4” and notes: “Friendly contests in 4 constituencies between BJP and AJSU.”)
NDA	AJSU			Sudesh Mahto	5	294+4
NDA	GJM		(Note: The supplied table notes that the ECI allotted the Table symbol in AC 23 Darjeeling and AC 22 Kalimpong, and the Candle symbol in AC 24 Kurseong.)	Bimal Gurung	3	294+4
NDA	Independent			-	2	294+4

== Candidates ==
List of the candidates (constituency wise) of the 3 main parties/alliance:

District	Constituency		UPA		Left Front		NDA	
District	#	Name	Party	Candidate	Party	Candidate	Party	Candidate
Cooch Behar	1	Mekliganj	INC	Jayanta Kumar Ray	AIFB	Paresh Chandra Adhikary	BJP	Subhash Barman
Cooch Behar	2	Mathabhanga	AITC	Binay Krishna Barman	CPM	Ananta Roy	BJP	Sushil Barman
Cooch Behar	3	Cooch Behar Uttar	AITC	Prasenjit Barman	AIFB	Nagendra Nath Roy	BJP	Malati Rava Roy
Cooch Behar	4	Cooch Behar Dakshin	AITC	Abdul Jalil Ahmed	AIFB	Akshay Thakur	BJP	Gayetri Kar
Cooch Behar	5	Sitalkuchi	AITC	Hiten Barman	CPM	Biswanath Pramanik	BJP	Bhabendra Nath Barman
Cooch Behar	6	Sitai	INC	Keshab Ch. Ray	AIFB	Dipak Kumar Roy	BJP	Brojo Gobinda Barman
Cooch Behar	7	Dinhata	NCP	Amiya Kumar Sarkar	AIFB	Udayan Guha	BJP	Sudhangshu Kumar Roy
Cooch Behar	8	Natabari	AITC	Rabindra Nath Ghosh	CPM	Tamser Ali	BJP	Utpal Deb
Cooch Behar	9	Tufanganj	AITC	Arghya Roy Pradhan	CPM	Dhananjoy Rava	BJP	Bimal Kumar Sarkar
Alipurduar	10	Kumargram	AITC	Joachim Baxla	RSP	Dasrath Tirkey	BJP	Hopna Soren
Alipurduar	11	Kalchini	AITC	Paban Kumar Lakra	RSP	Binay Bhusan Kerketta	IND	Wilson Champramary
Alipurduar	12	Alipurduars	INC	Debaprasad Roy	RSP	Kshiti Goswami	BJP	Manik Chandra Saha
Alipurduar	13	Falakata	AITC	Anil Adhikari	CPM	Rabindra Nath Barman	BJP	Hemanta Kumar Ray
Alipurduar	14	Madarihat	INC	Atul Suba	RSP	Kumari Kujur	BJP	Manoj Tigga
Jalpaiguri	15	Dhupguri	AITC	Mina Barman	CPM	Mamata Roy	BJP	Amar Chan Sarkar
Jalpaiguri	16	Maynaguri	AITC	Juthika Roy Basunia	RSP	Ananta Deb Adhikari	BJP	Bibhash Chandra Paul
Jalpaiguri	17	Jalpaiguri	INC	Sukhbilas Barma	AIFB	Gobinda Chandra Roy	BJP	Sisir Kanti Mondal
Jalpaiguri	18	Rajganj	AITC	Khageswar Roy	CPM	Amulya Kumar Roy	BJP	Supen Roy
Jalpaiguri	19	Dabgram-Phulbari	AITC	Goutam Deb	CPM	Dilip Singh	BJP	Dulal Kanti Das
Jalpaiguri	20	Mal	INC	Hiraman Oraon	CPM	Bulu Chik Baraik	BJP	Baliram Ekka
Jalpaiguri	21	Nagrakata	INC	Joseph Munda	CPM	Sukhmoith (Piting) Oraon	IND	Rajesh Lakra
Kalimpong	22	Kalimpong	INC	Shanti Kumar Sharma	CPI	Bikram Chhetri	GJM	Harka Bahadur Chhetri
Darjeeling	23	Darjeeling	INC	Nahakul Chandra Chhetri	CPM	K. B. Wattar	GJM	Trilok Kumar Dewan
Darjeeling	24	Kurseong	INC	Chhabi Chandra Rai	CPM	Deepa Chhetri	GJM	Rohit Sharma
Darjeeling	25	Matigara-Naxalbari	INC	Sankar Malakar	CPM	Jharen Roy	BJP	Ashim Kumar Sarkar
Darjeeling	26	Siliguri	AITC	Rudra Nath Bhattacharya	CPM	Ashok Bhattacharya	BJP	Arun Prasad Sarker
Darjeeling	27	Phansidewa	INC	Sunil Chandra Tirkey	CPM	Choton Kisku	BJP	Dila Saibo
Uttar Dinajpur	28	Chopra	AITC	Sekh Jalaluddin	CPM	Anwarul Haque	BJP	Ashim Chandra Barman
Uttar Dinajpur	29	Islampur	AITC	Abdul Karim Chowdhury	CPM	Sayeda Farhat Afroz	BJP	Nepal Dutta
Uttar Dinajpur	30	Goalpokhar	INC	Md. Ghulam Rabbani	AIFB	Safiur Rahaman	BJP	Shaukat Ali
Uttar Dinajpur	31	Chakulia	INC	Serajul Islam	AIFB	Ali Imran Ramz	BJP	Kalipada Ghosh
Uttar Dinajpur	32	Karandighi	INC	Subhas Goswami	AIFB	Gokul Roy	BJP	Arshad Alam
Uttar Dinajpur	33	Hemtabad	AITC	Shekhar Chandra Roy	CPM	Khagendra Nath Sinha	BJP	Bhanu Ram Barman
Uttar Dinajpur	34	Kaliaganj	INC	Pramatha Nath Ray	CPM	Nani Gopal Roy	BJP	Bhupati Roy
Uttar Dinajpur	35	Raiganj	INC	Mohit Sengupta	SP	Kiranmoy Nanda	BJP	Sachindra Nath Das
Uttar Dinajpur	36	Itahar	AITC	Amal Acharjee	CPI	Srikumar Mukherjee	BJP	Suman Kr Acharjee
Dakshin Dinajpur	37	Kushmandi	INC	Parthasarathi Sarkar	RSP	Narmada Chandra Roy	BJP	Ranjit Kumar Roy
Dakshin Dinajpur	38	Kumarganj	AITC	Mahmuda Begum	CPM	Khatun Mafuja	BJP	Sanjib Chandra Roy
Dakshin Dinajpur	39	Balurghat	AITC	Sankar Chakraborty	RSP	Biswanath Chowdhury	BJP	Ranjan Kumar Mondal
Dakshin Dinajpur	40	Tapan	AITC	Bachchu Hansda	RSP	Khara Soren	BJP	Colombas Tirkey
Dakshin Dinajpur	41	Gangarampur	AITC	Satyendra Nath Ray	CPM	Nandalal Hazra	BJP	Dipankar Roy
Dakshin Dinajpur	42	Harirampur	AITC	Biplab Mitra	CPM	Narayan Biswas	BJP	Phani Bhushan Mahato
Malda	43	Habibpur	AITC	Mohan Tudu	CPM	Khagen Murmu	BJP	Krishna Chandra Munda
Malda	44	Gazole	INC	Sushil Chandra Ray	CPM	Gobinda Mandal	BJP	Prafulla Chandra Sarkar
Malda	45	Chanchal	INC	Asif Mehbub	CPM	Anjuman Ara Begam	BJP	Sital Prasad Chakraborty
Malda	46	Harischandrapur	INC	Mostaque Alam	AIFB	Tajmul Hossain	BJP	Rina Saha
Malda	47	Malatipur	AITC	Gautam Chakraborty	RSP	Abdur Rahim Boxi	BJP	Harendra Nath Paul
Malda	48	Ratua	INC	Samar Mukherjee	CPM	Sailen Sarkar	BJP	Dilip Agarwalla
Malda	49	Manickchak	AITC	Sabitri Mitra	CPM	Ratna Bhattacharya	BJP	Dipankar Panday
Malda	50	Maldaha	INC	Bhupendra Nath Halder	CPM	Rahul Ranjan Das	BJP	Kusum Roy
Malda	51	Englishbazar	INC	Krishnendu Narayan Choudhury	CPM	Samar Roy	BJP	Gobinda Chandra Mandal
Malda	52	Mothabari	INC	Sabina Yeasmin	CPM	Naimuddin Sheikh	BJP	Nandan Kumar Ghosh
Malda	53	Sujapur	INC	Abu Nasar Khan Choudhury	CPM	Hazi Ketabuddin	BJP	Tutul Saha
Malda	54	Baishnab Nagar	INC	Isha Khan Choudhury	CPM	Biswanath Ghosh	BJP	Swadhin Kumar Sarkar
Murshidabad	55	Farakka	INC	Mainul Haque	CPM	Abdus Salam	BJP	Ghosh Hemanta
Murshidabad	56	Samserganj	INC	Mousumi Begum	CPM	Touab Ali	BJP	Sasthi Charan Ghosh
Murshidabad	57	Suti	INC	Emani Biswas	RSP	Jane Alam Mian	BJP	Nilkanta Roy
Murshidabad	58	Jangipur	INC	Md. Sohrab	CPM	Purnima Bhattacharya	BJP	Anamitra Banerjee
Murshidabad	59	Raghunathganj	INC	Akhruzzaman	RSP	Abul Hasnat Khan	BJP	Sougata Singha Roy
Murshidabad	60	Sagardighi	AITC	Subrata Saha	CPM	Ismail Sekh	BJP	Shekharendu Das
Murshidabad	61	Lalgola	INC	Abu Hena	CPM	Md Yean Ali	BJP	Amar Kumar Das
Murshidabad	62	Bhagabangola	AITC	Sagir Hossain	SP	Chand Mohammad	BJP	Mehebub Alam
Murshidabad	63	Raninagar	INC	Firoza Begam	AIFB	Mst. Maksuda Begum	BJP	Dinesh Mondal
Murshidabad	64	Murshidabad	INC	Shaoni Singha Roy	AIFB	Bivas Chakraborty	BJP	Ranajit Kumar Das
Murshidabad	65	Nabagram	INC	Probal Sarkar	CPM	Kanai Chandra Mondal	BJP	Dilip Haldar
Murshidabad	66	Khargram	INC	Ashis Marjit	CPM	Goutam Mondal	BJP	Harekrishna Konai
Murshidabad	67	Burwan	INC	Protima Rajak	RSP	Binoy Sarkar	BJP	Sukhen Kumar Bagdi
Murshidabad	68	Kandi	INC	Apurba Sarkar	CPI	Ainal Haque	BJP	Dhananjoy Mondal
Murshidabad	69	Bharatpur	INC	Daliya Begum	RSP	Id Mohammad	BJP	Madhusudan Saha
Murshidabad	70	Rejinagar	INC	Humayun Kabir	RSP	Sirajul Islam Mondal	BJP	Arabindu Biswas
Murshidabad	71	Beldanga	INC	Safiujjaman Seikh	RSP	Md. Refatullah	BJP	Alok Ghosh
Murshidabad	72	Baharampur	INC	Manoj Chakraborty	RSP	Tarit Kumar Brahmachari	BJP	Debasis Sarkar
Murshidabad	73	Hariharpara	AITC	Niamot Sheikh	CPM	Insar Ali Biswas	BJP	Bishnu Charan Sikdar
Murshidabad	74	Naoda	INC	Abu Taher Khan	RSP	Jayanta Kumar Biswas	BJP	Biplab Mondal
Murshidabad	75	Domkal	INC	Soumik Hossain	CPM	Anisur Rahman	BJP	Santosh Mondal
Murshidabad	76	Jalangi	AITC	Idris Ali	CPM	Abdur Razzak	BJP	Naba Kumar Sarkar
Nadia	77	Karimpur	AITC	Dr. Ramendra Nath Sarkar	CPM	Samarendranath Ghosh	BJP	Indrajit Mondal
Nadia	78	Tehatta	AITC	Gouri Sankar Dutta	CPM	Ranjit Kumar Mandal	BJP	Ashutosh Paul
Nadia	79	Palashipara	AITC	Manik Bhattacharjee	CPM	S. M. Saadi	BJP	Arjun Kumar Biswas
Nadia	80	Kaliganj	AITC	Nasiruddin Ahamed	RSP	Sankar Sarkar	BJP	Mahadeb Ghosh
Nadia	81	Nakashipara	AITC	Kallol Khan	CPM	Gayatri Sardar	BJP	Sushil Barman
Nadia	82	Chapra	AITC	Rukbanur Rahman	CPM	Shamsul Islam Mollah	BJP	Baidyanath Biswas
Nadia	83	Krishnanagar Uttar	AITC	Abani Mohan Joardar	CPM	Ghosh Subinay	BJP	Ramen Biswas
Nadia	84	Nabadwip	AITC	Pundarikakshya Saha	CPM	Biswas Sumit	BJP	Pinki Agarwal
Nadia	85	Krishnanagar Dakshin	AITC	Ujjal Biswas	CPM	Biswas Rama	BJP	Mahadev Sarkar
Nadia	86	Santipur	INC	Ajoy Dey	RCPI	Iyar Mallik	BJP	Kanoj Biswas
Nadia	87	Ranaghat Uttar Paschim	AITC	Parthasarathi Chatterjee	CPM	Meena Bhattacharya	BJP	Megh Lal Karmaker
Nadia	88	Krishnaganj	AITC	Sushil Biswas	CPM	Barun Biswas	BJP	Bipul Chandra Sen
Nadia	89	Ranaghat Uttar Purba	AITC	Samir Kumar Poddar	CPM	Archana Biswas	BJP	Basudeb Majumdar
Nadia	90	Ranaghat Dakshin	AITC	Abir Biswas	CPM	Aloke Kumar Das	BJP	Benoy Bhusan Roy
Nadia	91	Chakdaha	AITC	Naresh Chandra Chaki	CPM	Biswanath Gupta	BJP	Biswajit Ghosh
Nadia	92	Kalyani	AITC	Ramendra Nath Biswas	CPM	Jyotsna Sarkar (Sikder)	BJP	Dipali Bharati
Nadia	93	Haringhata	AITC	Nilima Nag	CPM	Biswajit Paul	BJP	Binay Krishna Biswas
North 24 Parganas	94	Bagdah	AITC	Upendra Nath Biswas	AIFB	Mrinal Kanti Sikdar	BJP	Arabinda Biswas
North 24 Parganas	95	Bongaon Uttar	AITC	Biswajit Das	CPM	Biswajit Kumar Biswas	BJP	Hari Chand Biswas
North 24 Parganas	96	Bongaon Dakshin	AITC	Surajit Kumar Biswas	CPM	Anuj Baran Sarkar	BJP	Arun Halder
North 24 Parganas	97	Gaighata	AITC	Manjul Krishna Thakur	CPI	Manoj Kanti Biswas	BJP	Sukha Ranjan Bepari
North 24 Parganas	98	Swarupnagar	AITC	Bina Mondal	CPM	Siva Pada Das	BJP	Rakhal Halder
North 24 Parganas	99	Baduria	INC	Abdul Gaffar Quazi	CPM	Md. Shelim Gain	BJP	Sukumar Dey
North 24 Parganas	100	Habra	AITC	Jyotipriya Mallick	CPM	Pranab Kumar Bhattacharyya	BJP	Utpal Kumar Paul
North 24 Parganas	101	Ashoknagar	AITC	Dhiman Roy	CPM	Satyasebi Kar	BJP	Gopal Nandi
North 24 Parganas	102	Amdanga	AITC	Rafiqur Rahaman	CPM	Abdus Sattar	BJP	Joydev Ghosh
North 24 Parganas	103	Bijpur	AITC	Subhranshu Roy	CPM	Dr. Nirjharini Chakraborty	BJP	Kamala Kant Choudhury
North 24 Parganas	104	Naihati	AITC	Partha Bhowmick	CPM	Ranjit Kundu	BJP	Biswajit Sur
North 24 Parganas	105	Bhatpara	AITC	Arjun Singh	CPM	Nepaldev Bhattacharya	BJP	Pradyot Kumar Chowdhury
North 24 Parganas	106	Jagatdal	AITC	Parash Dutta	AIFB	Haripada Biswas	BJP	Dilip Mitra
North 24 Parganas	107	Noapara	AITC	Manju Basu	CPM	Kusadhwaj Ghosh	BJP	Swapan Halder
North 24 Parganas	108	Barrackpur	AITC	Silbhadra Dutta	CPM	Madhusudan Samanta	BJP	Sambhu Nath Gupta
North 24 Parganas	109	Khardaha	AITC	Amit Mitra	CPM	Asim Dasgupta	BJP	Anadi Biswas
North 24 Parganas	110	Dum Dum Uttar	AITC	Chandrima Bhattacharya	CPM	Rekha Goswami	BJP	Chandan Roy
North 24 Parganas	111	Panihati	AITC	Nirmal Ghosh	CPM	Ahibhusan (Dulal) Chakraborty	BJP	Kishor Kumar Shaw
North 24 Parganas	112	Kamarhati	AITC	Madan Mitra	CPM	Manash Mukherjee	BJP	Shikha Sarkar
North 24 Parganas	113	Baranagar	AITC	Tapas Roy	RSP	Sukumar Ghosh	BJP	Bijay Shankar Agarwal
North 24 Parganas	114	Dum Dum	AITC	Bratya Basu	CPM	Gautam Deb	BJP	Anjana Chaturvedi
North 24 Parganas	115	Rajarhat New Town	AITC	Sabyasachi Dutta	CPM	Tapash Chatterjee	BJP	Priyalal Dutta
North 24 Parganas	116	Bidhannagar	AITC	Sujit Bose	CPM	Palash Das	BJP	Ashoke Sarkar
North 24 Parganas	117	Rajarhat Gopalpur	AITC	Purnendu Basu	CPM	Rabindra Nath Mandal	BJP	Manoranjan Das
North 24 Parganas	118	Madhyamgram	AITC	Rathin Ghosh	AIFB	Ranjit Chowdhury	BJP	Bijoy Banerjee
North 24 Parganas	119	Barasat	AITC	Chiranjeet Chakraborty	AIFB	Sanjib Chattopadhaya	BJP	Tuhin Kumar Mondal
North 24 Parganas	120	Deganga	AITC	Dr. M. Nuruzzaman	AIFB	Mortaza Hossain	BJP	Tarun Kanti Ghosh
North 24 Parganas	121	Haroa	AITC	Julfikar Molla	CPM	Imtiaz Hossain	BJP	Subodh Kumar Chakraborty
North 24 Parganas	122	Minakhan	AITC	Usha Rani Mondal	CPM	Dilip Roy	BJP	Bhabesh Patra
North 24 Parganas	123	Sandeshkhali	AITC	Padma Mahato	CPM	Nirapada Sardar	BJP	Sukumar Sardar
North 24 Parganas	124	Basirhat Dakshin	AITC	Narayan Goswami	CPM	Narayan Mukherjee	BJP	Hajari Lal Sarkar
North 24 Parganas	125	Basirhat Uttar	AITC	Sardar Amjad Ali	CPM	Mostafa Bin Quasem	BJP	Soumen Mandal
North 24 Parganas	126	Hingalganj	AITC	Debes Mondal	CPI	Anandamay Mandal	BJP	Rati Kanta Bauliya
South 24 Parganas	127	Gosaba	AITC	Jayanta Naskar	RSP	Samarendra Nath Mondal	BJP	Sukumar Mondal
South 24 Parganas	128	Basanti	INC	Arnab Ray	RSP	Subhas Naskar	BJP	Amal Kanti Ray
South 24 Parganas	129	Kultali	INC	Sujit Patwari	CPM	Ram Sankar Halder	BJP	Nilkantha Mondal
South 24 Parganas	130	Patharpratima	AITC	Samir Kumar Jana	CPM	Jajneswar Das	BJP	Mantu Ram Gayen
South 24 Parganas	131	Kakdwip	AITC	Manturam Pakhira	CPM	Milan Bhattacharyya	BJP	Nirmal Kumar Das
South 24 Parganas	132	Sagar	AITC	Bankim Chandra Hazra	CPM	Milan Parua	BJP	Bimal Maity
South 24 Parganas	133	Kulpi	AITC	Jogaranjan Halder	CPM	Sakuntala Paik	BJP	Swapan Halder
South 24 Parganas	134	Raidighi	AITC	Debashree Roy	CPM	Kanti Ganguly	BJP	Dwijendranath Haldar
South 24 Parganas	135	Mandirbazar	AITC	Joydeb Halder	CPM	Dr. Sarat Chandra Halder	BJP	Goutam Naskar
South 24 Parganas	136	Jaynagar	INC	Manoranjan Halder	CPM	Shyamali Halder	BJP	Utpal Kumar Mandal
South 24 Parganas	137	Baruipur Purba	AITC	Nirmal Mondal	CPM	Bimal Mistry	BJP	Tapas Naskar
South 24 Parganas	138	Canning Paschim	AITC	Shyamal Mondal	CPM	Jaydeb Purkait	BJP	Manojit Mondal
South 24 Parganas	139	Canning Purba	INC	Ibrahim Molya	CPM	Abdur Razzak Molla	BJP	Ghanashyam Mondal
South 24 Parganas	140	Baruipur Paschim	AITC	Biman Banerjee	CPM	Kanak Kanti Paria	BJP	Raneswar Das
South 24 Parganas	141	Magrahat Purba	AITC	Namita Saha	CPM	Chandan Saha	BJP	Ratan Kumar Sardar
South 24 Parganas	142	Magrahat Paschim	AITC	Giasuddin Molla	CPM	Abul Hasnat	BJP	Subhas Mondal
South 24 Parganas	143	Diamond Harbour	AITC	Dipak Kumar Halder	CPM	Subhra Sau	BJP	Krishna Baidya
South 24 Parganas	144	Falta	AITC	Tamonash Ghosh	CPM	Ardhendu Sekhar Bindu	BJP	Ajit Kumar Haldar
South 24 Parganas	145	Satgachia	AITC	Sonali Guha	CPM	Barun Naskar	BJP	Subrata Samanta
South 24 Parganas	146	Bishnupur (SC)	AITC	Dilip Mondal	CPM	Sudhin Sinha	BJP	Sekhar Naskar
South 24 Parganas	147	Sonarpur Dakshin	AITC	Jiban Mukhopadhyay	CPI	Tarit Chakraborty	BJP	Hasi Singha Roy
South 24 Parganas	148	Bhangore	AITC	Arabul Islam	CPM	Badal Jamadar	BJP	Madhusudan Sanpui
South 24 Parganas	149	Kasba	AITC	Javed Ahmed Khan	CPM	Shatarup Ghosh	BJP	Bikash Debnath
South 24 Parganas	150	Jadavpur	AITC	Manish Gupta	CPM	Buddhadeb Bhattacharjee	BJP	Dhononjoy Mukherjee
South 24 Parganas	151	Sonarpur Uttar	AITC	Firdousi Begum	CPM	Shyamal Naskar	BJP	Debasish Purkait
South 24 Parganas	152	Tollygunj	AITC	Aroop Biswas	CPM	Partha Pratim Biswas	BJP	Bibekananda Singha Ray
South 24 Parganas	153	Behala Purba	AITC	Sovan Chatterjee	CPM	Kumkum Chakraborti	BJP	A. Biswajit Naidu
South 24 Parganas	154	Behala Paschim	AITC	Partha Chatterjee	CPM	Anupam Debsarkar	BJP	Amalendu Roychowdhury
South 24 Parganas	155	Maheshtala	AITC	Kasturi Das	CPM	Sk. Md. Israil	BJP	Sisir Kumar Mukhapadhyay
South 24 Parganas	156	Budge Budge	AITC	Ashok Kumar Deb	CPM	Hrishikesh Podder	BJP	Ariful Islam
South 24 Parganas	157	Metiaburuz	AITC	Mumtaz Begum	CPM	Badruddoza Molla	BJP	Md. Sajjad
Kolkata	158	Kolkata Port	AITC	Firhad Hakim	AIFB	Moinuddin Shams	BJP	Raj Kumari Shaw
Kolkata	159	Bhabanipur	AITC	Subrata Bakshi	CPM	Narayan Prasad Jain	BJP	Ram Chandra Jaiswal
Kolkata	160	Rashbehari	AITC	Sovandeb Chattopadhyay	CPM	Shantanu Basu	BJP	Jiban Kumar Sen
Kolkata	161	Ballygunge	AITC	Subrata Mukherjee	CPM	Dr. Fuad Halim	BJP	Shatorupa
Kolkata	162	Chowrangee	AITC	Sikha Chowdhury	RJD	Bimal Singh	BJP	Shahnawaz Ahmed
Kolkata	163	Entally	AITC	Swarna Kamal Saha	CPM	Debesh Das	BJP	Sudhir Kumar Pandey
Kolkata	164	Beleghata	AITC	Paresh Paul	CPM	Anadi Kumar Sahu	BJP	Arun Shaw
Kolkata	165	Jorasanko	AITC	Smita Bakshi	CPM	Janki Singh	BJP	Mina Devi Purohit
Kolkata	166	Shyampukur	AITC	Shashi Panja	AIFB	Jiban Prakash Saha	BJP	Ganesh Kumar Dhanania
Kolkata	167	Maniktala	AITC	Sadhan Pande	CPM	Rupa Bagchi	BJP	Nandalal Singhania
Kolkata	168	Kashipur-Belgachia	AITC	Mala Saha	CPM	Kaninika Ghosh	BJP	Aditya Tandon
Howrah	169	Bally	AITC	Sultan Singh	CPM	Kanika Ganguly	BJP	Bharat Bhushan Ojha
Howrah	170	Howrah Uttar	AITC	Ashok Ghosh	CPM	Nimai Samanta	BJP	Umesh Rai
Howrah	171	Howrah Madhya	AITC	Arup Roy	CPM	Arup Ray (Tukun)	BJP	Mousumi Biswas
Howrah	172	Shibpur	AITC	Jatu Lahiri	AIFB	Jagannath Bhattacharya	BJP	Prabir Ray
Howrah	173	Howrah Dakshin	AITC	Brajamohan Mazumder	CPM	Krishna Kisor Ray	BJP	Pramila Singh
Howrah	174	Sankrail	AITC	Sital Kumar Sardar	CPM	Dr. Anirban Hazra	BJP	Jnan Prakash Ray
Howrah	175	Panchla	AITC	Gulsan Mullick	AIFB	Doli Roy	BJP	Shyamal Kumar Adak
Howrah	176	Uluberia Purba	AITC	Haider Aziz Safwi	CPM	Mohan Mondal	BJP	Papiya Mondal
Howrah	177	Uluberia Uttar	AITC	Nirmal Maji	CPM	Ghuku Bhim	BJP	Archana Ray
Howrah	178	Uluberia Dakshin	AITC	Pulak Roy	AIFB	Sk. Ahmed Kutubuddin	BJP	Goutam Mukherjee
Howrah	179	Shyampur	AITC	Kalipada Mandal	AIFB	Minati Pramanik	BJP	Gour Mohan Das
Howrah	180	Bagnan	AITC	Arunava Sen	CPM	Akkel Ali Khan	BJP	Tapan Kumar Mondal
Howrah	181	Amta	INC	Asit Mitra	CPM	Rabindranath Mitra	BJP	Sanat Hajra
Howrah	182	Udaynarayanpur	AITC	Samir Kumar Panja	CPM	Chandralekha Bag	BJP	Tapan Dhara
Howrah	183	Jagatballavpur	AITC	Abul Kasem Molla	CPM	Kazi Jafar Ahmed	BJP	Baij Nath Sha
Howrah	184	Domjur	AITC	Rajib Banerjee	CPM	Mohanta Chatterjee	BJP	Parthasarathi Baksi
Hooghly	185	Uttarpara	AITC	Anup Ghosal	CPM	Srutinath Praharaj	BJP	Pranab Chakraborty
Hooghly	186	Sreerampur	AITC	Sudipto Roy	CPI	Partha Sarathi Rej	BJP	Vidya Sagar Pandey
Hooghly	187	Champdani	AITC	Muzaffar Khan	CPM	Jibesh Chakraborty	BJP	Durga Verma
Hooghly	188	Singur	AITC	Rabindranath Bhattacharya	CPM	Dr. Asit Das	BJP	Patra Souren
Hooghly	189	Chandannagore	AITC	Ashok Kumar Shaw	CPM	Siba Prosad Bandyopadhyay	BJP	Satya Bhusan Pathak
Hooghly	190	Chunchura	AITC	Asit Mazumdar	AIFB	Naren Dey	BJP	Champa Chakraborty
Hooghly	191	Balagarh	AITC	Ashim Kumar Majhi	CPM	Bhuban Pramanick	BJP	Bangshi Rauth
Hooghly	192	Pandua	AITC	Nargis Begum	CPM	Sheikh Amjad Hossain	BJP	Debaprasad Chakrabortty
Hooghly	193	Saptagram	AITC	Tapan Dasgupta	CPM	Ashutosh Mukhopadhyay	BJP	Kartick Chandra Paul
Hooghly	194	Chanditala	AITC	Swati Khandoker	CPM	Sk. Azim Ali Md	BJP	Sudipta Chattopadhyay
Hooghly	195	Jangipara	AITC	Snehasis Chakraborty	CPM	Sudarsan Raychaudhuri	BJP	Prosenjit Bag
Hooghly	196	Haripal	AITC	Becharam Manna	CPM	Bharati Mukherjee	BJP	Partha Sarathi Banerjee
Hooghly	197	Dhanekhali	AITC	Ashima Patra	AIFB	Shrabani Sarkar	BJP	Kripasindhu Roy
Hooghly	198	Tarakeswar	AITC	Rachhpal Singh	CPM	Pratim Chatterjee	BJP	Ganesh Chakraborty
Hooghly	199	Pursurah	AITC	Parvez Rahman	CPM	Saumendranath Bera	BJP	Sukumar Dhara
Hooghly	200	Arambag	AITC	Krishna Chandra Santra	CPM	Asit Kumar Malik	BJP	Sukumar Santra
Hooghly	201	Goghat	INC	Debasish Medda	AIFB	Biswanath Karak	BJP	Sukumar Bag
Hooghly	202	Khanakul	AITC	Iqbal Ahmed	CPM	Subhra Parui	BJP	Arabinda Maity
Purba Medinipur	203	Tamluk	AITC	Soumen Mahapatra	CPI	Jagannath Mitra	BJP	Malay Kumar Singha
Purba Medinipur	204	Panskura Purba	AITC	Biplab Roy Chowdhury	CPM	Amiya Kumar Sahoo	BJP	Debkumar Maiti
Purba Medinipur	205	Panskura Paschim	AITC	Sk. Omar Ali	CPI	Nirmal Kumar Bera	BJP	Narayankinkar Misra
Purba Medinipur	206	Moyna	AITC	Bhushan Chandra Dolai	CPM	Sk. Mujibur Rahaman	BJP	Asit Pattanayak
Purba Medinipur	207	Nandakumar	AITC	Sukumar De	SP	Brahmamay Nanda	BJP	Adhikary Nilanjan
Purba Medinipur	208	Mahisadal	AITC	Sudarshan Ghosh Dastidar	CPM	Tamalika Ponda Seth	BJP	Prasenjit Samanta
Purba Medinipur	209	Haldia	AITC	Seuli Saha	CPM	Nityananda Bera	BJP	Kalipada Das
Purba Medinipur	210	Nandigram	AITC	Phiroja Bibi	CPI	Paramananda Bharati	BJP	Kumar Bijan Das
Purba Medinipur	211	Chandipur	AITC	Amiya Kanti Bhattacharjee	CPM	Bidyut Guchhait	BJP	Chanchal Kumar Maiti
Purba Medinipur	212	Patashpur	AITC	Jyotirmoy Kar	CPI	Makhan Lal Nayak	BJP	Ashish Das
Purba Medinipur	213	Kanthi Uttar	AITC	Banasri Maity	CPM	Chakradhar Maikap	BJP	Gourhari Jana
Purba Medinipur	214	Bhagabanpur	AITC	Ardhendu Maity	SP	Ranajit Manna	BJP	Sadananda De
Purba Medinipur	215	Khejuri	AITC	Ranajit Mondal	SP	Asim Kumar Mandal	BJP	Kalipada Mandal
Purba Medinipur	216	Kanthi Dakshin	AITC	Dibyendu Adhikari	CPI	Uttam Pradhan	BJP	Kamalesh Mishra
Purba Medinipur	217	Ramnagar	AITC	Akhil Giri	CPM	Swadesh Ranjan Nayak	BJP	Satyaranjan Das
Purba Medinipur	218	Egra	AITC	Samares Das	DSP	Hrishikesh Paria	BJP	Minati Sur
Paschim Medinipur	219	Dantan	AITC	Shaibal Giri	CPI	Arun Mohapatra	BJP	Shailendra Jana
Jhargram	220	Nayagram	AITC	Dulal Murmu	CPM	Bhutnath Saren	BJP	Chitta Ranjan Hembram
Jhargram	221	Gopiballavpur	AITC	Churamani Mahato	CPM	Rabi Lal Maitra	BJP	Sanjit Mahata
Jhargram	222	Jhargram	AITC	Sukumar Hansda	CPM	Amar Basu	BJP	Bijay Mahato
Paschim Medinipur	223	Keshiary	AITC	Shyam Charan Mandi	CPM	Biram Mandi	BJP	Dilip Routh
Paschim Medinipur	224	Kharagpur Sadar	INC	Gyan Singh Sohanpal	CPM	Anil Kumar Das	BJP	Prem Chandra Jha
Paschim Medinipur	225	Narayangarh	AITC	Surja Kanta Atta	CPM	Surjya Kanta Mishra	BJP	Krishna Prasad Roy
Paschim Medinipur	226	Sabang	INC	Manas Bhunia	CPM	Rampada Sahoo	BJP	Sabyasachi Sahu
Paschim Medinipur	227	Pingla	AITC	Ajit Maity	DSP	Prabodh Chandra Sinha	BJP	Sambhunath Hansda
Paschim Medinipur	228	Kharagpur	AITC	Bilkis Khanam	CPM	Sheikh Najmul Haque	BJP	Prabir Kumar Sahu
Paschim Medinipur	229	Debra	AITC	Radhakanta Maiti	CPM	Sk. Sorab Hossein	BJP	Dilip Kumar Roy
Paschim Medinipur	230	Daspur	AITC	Ajit Bhunia	CPM	Sunil Adhikari	BJP	Sujit Pain
Paschim Medinipur	231	Ghatal	AITC	Shankar Dolai	CPM	Chhabi Pakhira	BJP	Ashok Malik
Paschim Medinipur	232	Chandrakona	AITC	Sibaram Das	CPM	Chhaya Dolai	BJP	Bapi Dera
Paschim Medinipur	233	Garbeta	INC	Hema Choubey	CPM	Susanta Ghosh	BJP	Tarak Nath Gan
Paschim Medinipur	234	Salboni	AITC	Srikanta Mahata	CPM	Abhiram Mahata	BJP	Dhiman Kumar Kolay
Paschim Medinipur	235	Keshpur	INC	Rajani Kanta Doloi	CPM	Rameswar Doloi	BJP	Dipak Patra
Paschim Medinipur	236	Medinipur	AITC	Mrigendra Nath Maiti	CPI	Santosh Rana	BJP	Subhajit Roy
Jhargram	237	Binpur	JKP	Chunibala Hansda	CPM	Dibakar Hansda	BJP	Panchanan Hansda
Purulia	238	Bandwan	INC	Sital Chandra Hembram	CPM	Besra Susanta	BJP	Manika Murmu
Purulia	239	Balarampur	AITC	Santiram Mahato	CPM	Manindra Gope	BJP	Batulal Mahato
Purulia	240	Baghmundi	INC	Nepal Mahata	AIFB	Mangal Mahato	AJSU	Rakesh Mahato
Purulia	241	Joypur	AITC	Kirton Chandra Mahato	AIFB	Dhirendra Nath Mahato	BJP	Shripati Mahato
Purulia	242	Purulia	AITC	K. P. Singh Deo	CPM	Kaushik Mazumdar	BJP	Panch Kari Mukherjee
Purulia	243	Manbazar	AITC	Sandhya Rani Tudu	CPM	Himani Hansda	BJP	Gouri Sardar
Purulia	244	Kashipur	AITC	Swapan Kumar Beltharia	CPM	Subhas Chandra Mahata	BJP	Prasanta Singh Deo
Purulia	245	Para	INC	Umapada Bauri	CPM	Dipak Bauri	BJP	Bauri Swapan
Purulia	246	Raghunathpur (SC)	AITC	Purna Chandra Bauri	CPM	Dipali Bauri	BJP	Subhas Chandra Mondal
Bankura	247	Saltora	AITC	Swapan Bauri	CPM	Sasthi Charan Bauri	BJP	Mangal Chandra Mondal
Bankura	248	Chhatna	AITC	Subhasis Batabyal	RSP	Anath Bandhu Mondal	BJP	Rabindranath Mandal
Bankura	249	Ranibundh	AITC	Falguni Hembram	CPM	Deblina Hembram	BJP	Lakshmi Kanta Sardar
Bankura	250	Raipur (ST)	AITC	Pramila Murmu	CPM	Upen Kisku	BJP	Pelaram Murmu
Bankura	251	Taldangra	INC	Arun Kumar Pathak	CPM	Manoranjan Patra	BJP	Milan Singhamahapatra
Bankura	252	Bankura	AITC	Kashinath Mishra	CPM	Pratip Mukherjee	BJP	Anil Ghosh
Bankura	253	Barjora	AITC	Asutosh Mukherjee	CPM	Susmita Biswas	BJP	Sanjoy Pal
Bankura	254	Onda	AITC	Arup Kumar Khan	AIFB	Tarapada Chakrabarti	BJP	Amarnath Shakha
Bankura	255	Bishnupur	AITC	Shyam Mukherjee	CPM	Ghosh Swapan	BJP	Pankaj Dhar
Bankura	256	Katulpur	INC	Saumitra Khan	CPM	Purnima Bagdi	BJP	Kotal Tarun
Bankura	257	Indus	AITC	Gurupada Mete	CPM	Santanu Kumar Bora	BJP	Srikanta Bagdi
Bankura	258	Sonamukhi	AITC	Dipali Saha	CPM	Chongre Manoranjan	BJP	Madhab Bagdi
Purba Bardhaman	259	Khandaghosh	AITC	Alok Kumar Majhi	CPM	Nabin Chandra Bag	BJP	Krishna Das Singha
Purba Bardhaman	260	Bardhaman Dakshin	AITC	Rabiranjan Chattopadhyay	CPM	Nirupam Sen	BJP	Sandip Nandi
Purba Bardhaman	261	Raina	AITC	Nepal Ghorui	CPM	Khan Basudeb	BJP	Pandit Krishna Chandra
Purba Bardhaman	262	Jamalpur (SC)	AITC	Ujjal Pramanick	CPM	Samar Hazra	BJP	Subrata Malik
Purba Bardhaman	263	Monteswar	AITC	Abu Ayesh Mondal	CPM	Chowdhury Md Hedayatullah	BJP	Sakshi Gopal Ghosh
Purba Bardhaman	264	Kalna	AITC	Biswajit Kundu	CPM	Sukul Chandra Sikdar	BJP	Dilip Mondal
Purba Bardhaman	265	Memari	AITC	Abul Hasem Mondal	CPM	Debashis Ghosh	BJP	Biswajit Poddar
Purba Bardhaman	266	Bardhaman Uttar	AITC	Nisith Kumar Malik	CPM	Aparna Saha	BJP	Sunil Sen
Purba Bardhaman	267	Bhatar	AITC	Banamali Hazra	CPM	Srijit Konar	BJP	Konyar Dhatripada
Purba Bardhaman	268	Purbasthali Dakshin	AITC	Swapan Debnath	CPM	Aleya Begam Sekh	BJP	Mahadeb Basak
Purba Bardhaman	269	Purbasthali Uttar	AITC	Tapan Chatterjee	CPM	Pradip Kumar Saha	BJP	Swapan Bhattacharya
Purba Bardhaman	270	Katwa	INC	Rabindranath Chatterjee	CPM	Sudipta Bagchi	BJP	Anil Dutta
Purba Bardhaman	271	Ketugram	AITC	Sekh Sahonawez	CPM	Abul Kadar Syed	BJP	Debabrata Basu
Purba Bardhaman	272	Mangalkot	AITC	Apurba Chowdhury	CPM	Sahajahan Choudhury	BJP	Aloke Taranga Goswami
Purba Bardhaman	273	Ausgram	INC	Chanchal Kumar Mondal	CPM	Basudev Mete	BJP	Santi Karmakar
Purba Bardhaman	274	Galsi	AITC	Joydeb Saha	AIFB	Sunil Kumar Mondal	BJP	Tapan Bagdi
Paschim Bardhaman	275	Pandabeswar	AITC	Zahir Alam	CPM	Gauranga Chatterjee	BJP	Ashish Garai
Paschim Bardhaman	276	Durgapur Purba	AITC	Nikhil Kumar Banerjee	CPM	Alpana Chowdhury	BJP	Lakshman Chandra Ghorui
Paschim Bardhaman	277	Durgapur Paschim	AITC	Apurba Mukherjee	CPM	Biprendu Chakraborty	BJP	Kalyan Chaubey
Paschim Bardhaman	278	Raniganj	AITC	Sohrab Ali	CPM	Runu Dutta	BJP	Shobhapati Singh
Paschim Bardhaman	279	Jamuria	AITC	Prabhat Kumar Chatterjee	CPM	Jahanara Khan	BJP	Pramod Pathak
Paschim Bardhaman	280	Asansol Dakshin	AITC	Tapas Banerjee	CPM	Ashok Kumar Mukherjee	BJP	Pawan Singh
Paschim Bardhaman	281	Asansol Uttar	AITC	Moloy Ghatak	CPM	Ranu Roychowdhury	BJP	Madan Mohan Choubey
Paschim Bardhaman	282	Kulti	AITC	Ujjal Chatterjee	AIFB	Acharya Maniklal	BJP	Vivekananda Bhattacharjee
Paschim Bardhaman	283	Barbani	AITC	Bidhan Upadhyay	CPM	Abhas Ray Chaudhuri	BJP	Biswanath Roy
Birbhum	284	Dubrajpur	AITC	Santoshi Saha	AIFB	Bijoy Bagdi	BJP	Paltu Pada Dhibar
Birbhum	285	Suri	AITC	Swapan Kanti Ghosh	CPM	Abdul Gaffar	BJP	Partha De
Birbhum	286	Bolpur	AITC	Chandranath Sinha	RSP	Tapan Hore	BJP	Dilip Ghosh
Birbhum	287	Nanoor	AITC	Gadhadhar Hazra	CPM	Shyamali Pradhan	BJP	Rajkumar Fulmali
Birbhum	288	Labhpur	AITC	Monirul Islam	CPM	Nabanita Mukherjee	BJP	Kashi Nath Mishra
Birbhum	289	Sainthia	AITC	Parikshit Bala	CPM	Dhiren Bagdi	BJP	Shibnath Saha
Birbhum	290	Mayureswar	AITC	Jatil Mondal	CPM	Asok Ray	BJP	Dudh Kumar Mondal
Birbhum	291	Rampurhat	AITC	Asish Banerjee	AIFB	Rebati Bhattacharya	BJP	Subhasis Choudhury (Khokon)
Birbhum	292	Hansan	INC	Asit Kumar Mal	RCPI	Kamal Hasan	BJP	Ruparani Mondal
Birbhum	293	Nalhati	INC	Abhijit Mukherjee	AIFB	Dipak Chatterjee	BJP	Anil Singha
Birbhum	294	Murarai	AITC	Noor Alam Chowdhury	CPM	Qamre Elahi	BJP	Sudhir Ranjan Das Goswami

=== Party/Alliance Seat Wise Matrix ===
Alliance and Party
Alliance and Party		UPA			
Alliance and Party		TMC	INC	NCP	JKP
LF					
LF	CPI(M)	175	37	—N/a	1
LF	AIFB	21	12	1	—N/a
LF	RSP	11	12	—N/a	—N/a
LF	CPI	12	2	—N/a	—N/a
LF	SP	4	1	—N/a	—N/a
LF	RJD	1	—N/a	—N/a	—N/a
LF	RCPI	—N/a	2	—N/a	—N/a
LF	DSP(PC)	2	—N/a	—N/a	—N/a
Total		294			

== Campaign ==
Mamata Banerjee ended her campaign on 9 May in the constituency of the incumbent CM Bhattacharjee in Jadavpur a day after Bhattacharjee appealed to the electorate there to return him to power. Before campaigning ended at 17:00, she appealed to the electorate to "Help me bring about change." The Trinamool Congress heavily campaigned for Paribartan ('change' in Bengali) under its slogan Badla noy Badal chai ('We don't want revenge, we want change' in Bengali), referring the political violence unleashed by the CPI(M) in Singur, Nandigram & Netai.

=== Land reform ===
Following the general election, with the TMC being an important part of the central government's coalition, the central government eased its controversial land acquisition policy for Special Economic Zones. Part of the proposal was that the government would not get involved in land acquisition for private organizations. One official from the central ruling coalition was quoted as saying that "There is a tacit understanding between these two critical allies that there will be no decision on the Land Acquisition Bill until the results of West Bengal state elections are clear." The issue of land acquisition for development also created a battle zone like situation in the villages between armed cadres of the ruling CPM and the Maoists. as seen in the 2006 Singur anti-land acquisition movement & 2007 Nandigram anti-land acquisition movement.

=== Gorkhaland ===
During the general election the issue of the founding of Gorkhaland as separate from West Bengal gained prominence along with the victory of Jaswant Singh from Darjeeling for the Bharatiya Janata Party, and supported by the Gorkha Janmukti Morcha (which advocates the creation of a separate Gorkhaland for ethnic Nepalis as opposed to ethnic Bengalis).

Since the election the issue again cropped up as demands for a separate Telangana being bifurcated from Andhra Pradesh grew. During this election CM Bhattacharjee said that Gorkhaland should not be separated but instead an additional development of the region should occur. He said in Lichupokhri that those advocating the separation should "stop your movement for a Gorkhaland. It will never be fulfilled. Concentrate on the all-round development of Darjeeling as it is the only solution to the issue."

== Election ==
On 17 April, the Election Commission of India issued an appeal for all registered voters to turn out for their respective electoral dates.

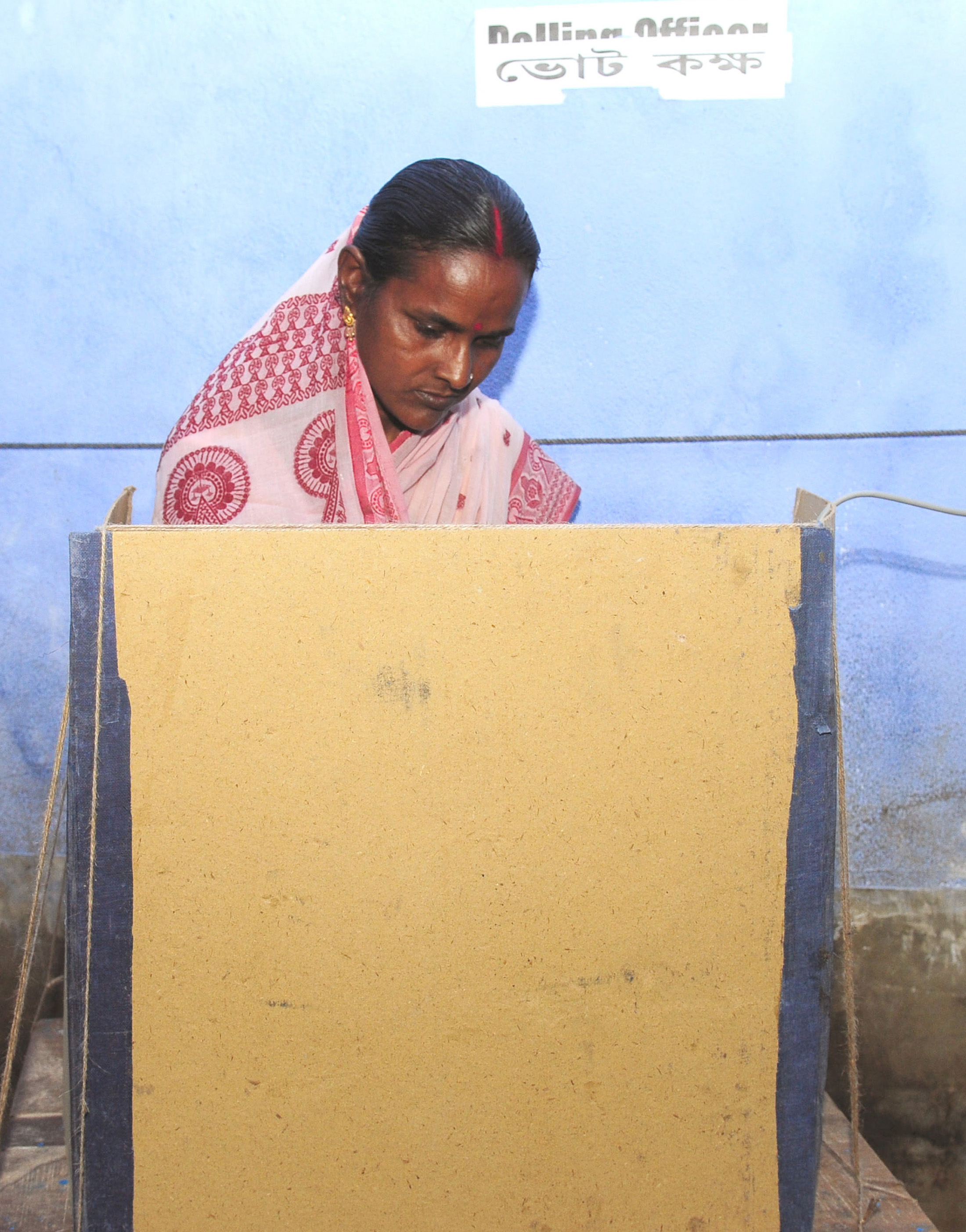
A female voter casting her vote at a polling station, in Abadanga, Birbhum district, during the Assembly Election in West Bengal on April 23, 2011

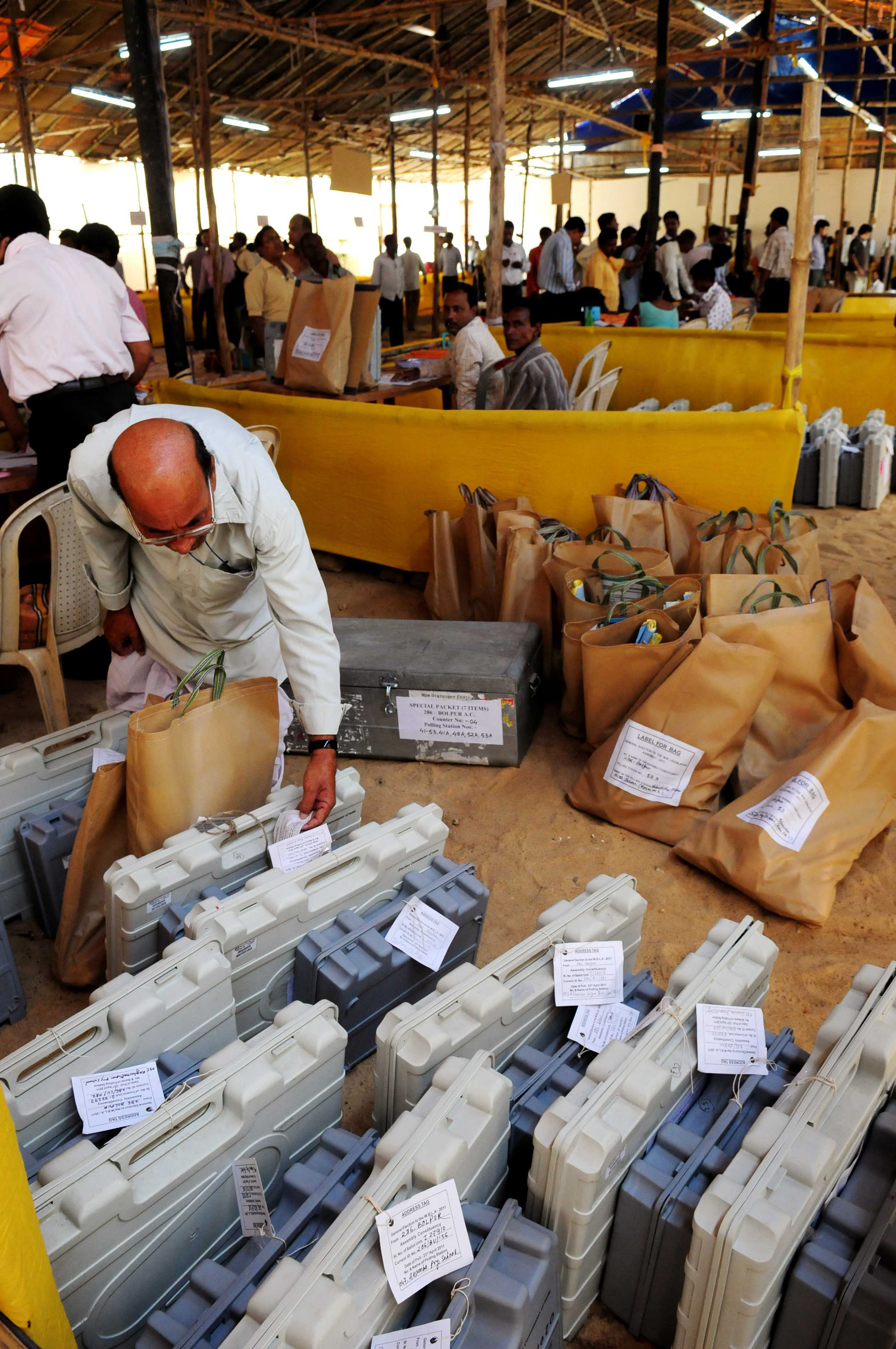
A Polling Officer checking the Electronic Voting Machines (EVM's) and other necessary inputs required in the West Bengal Assembly Election, before the distribution of machines, at Bolpur Govt. High School on April 22, 2011

During the first phase, the Indian border with Bangladesh at the Maldaha constituency was sealed from 16 April, two days before the election, to "prevent miscreants from causing trouble." One-hundred and twelve companies of central paramilitary forces were delegated to man 260 voting booths, 150 of which were decreed to be "sensitive." The district magistrate Rajesh Kumar Sinha also said that 50 booths would be put under round-the-clock online surveillance.

Seven Bengali film stars and theatre personalities won seats with the TMC ticket.

=== Exit polls ===
Party	Seats Contested	Star News-Nielsen	CNN-IBN-Week
AITC & INC Alliance	294	225	222-234
Left Front	294	34	60-72
Bharatiya Janata Party	294	2	2
Independent/Others	-	33	10-2
Total	294		
Source: a

== Results ==
=== Party/Alliance wise ===
Alliance/ Party		Popular vote			Seats		
Alliance/ Party		Votes	%	±pp	Contested	Won	+/−
UPA	AITC	1,85,47,678	38.93	▲12.29	226	184	▲154
UPA	INC	43,30,580	9.09	▼5.62	66	42	▲21
UPA	JKP(N)	53,118	0.11	▼0.15	1	0	▼1
UPA	NCP	13,093	0.03	▼0.16	1	0	Steady
UPA	Total	2,29,44,469	48.16	Steady	294	226	Steady
LF	CPI(M)	1,43,30,061	30.08	▼7.05	213	40	▼136
LF	AIFB	22,85,829	4.80	▼0.86	34	11	▼12
LF	RSP	14,11,254	2.96	▼0.75	23	7	▼13
LF	CPI	8,76,576	1.84	▼0.07	14	2	▼6
LF	SP	3,54,788	0.74	▲0.56	5	1	▲1
LF	DSP	1,67,963	0.35	▼0.01	2	1	Steady
LF	RCPI	1,07,662	0.23	New entry	2	0	Steady
LF	RJD	21,711	0.05	▼0.03	1	0	▼1
LF	Total	1,95,55,844	41.05		294	62	
NDA	BJP	19,34,650	4.06	▲2.13	288 + 1	0	Steady
NDA	GJM	3,43,931	0.72	New entry	3	3	▲3
NDA	AJSU	18,220	0.04	New entry	1 + 4	0	Steady
NDA	IND	67,201	0.14	Steady	2	1	Steady
NDA	Total	23,64,002	4.96	Steady	294 + 5	4	Steady
SUCI(C)		2,09,795	0.44		30	1	▲1
BSP		2,91,602	0.61	▼0.09	150	0	Steady
JMM		2,26,047	0.47	▲0.29	30	0	Steady
Others		6,21,630	1.29	Steady	296	0	Steady
IND		14,24,743	2.99	Steady	399	1	Steady
Total		4,76,38,132	100%	-	1792	294	-

=== Results by constituency ===
District	Constituency		Winner				Runner Up				Margin	%
District	#	Name	Candidate	Party	Votes	%	Candidate	Party	Votes	%	Margin	%
Cooch; Behar	1	Mekliganj (SC)	Paresh Chandra Adhikary	AIFB	72,040	48.89	Jayanta Kumar Ray	INC	39,408	26.74	32,632	22.15
Cooch; Behar	2	Mathabhanga (SC)	Binay Krishna Barman	AITC	78,249	46.46	Ananta Roy	CPI(M)	72,925	43.30	5,324	3.16
Cooch; Behar	3	Cooch Behar Uttar (SC)	Nagendra Nath Roy	AIFB	84,825	45.11	Prasenjit Barman	AITC	82,628	43.94	2,197	1.17
Cooch; Behar	4	Cooch Behar Dakshin	Akshay Thakur	AIFB	72,028	47.04	Abdul Jalil Ahmed	AITC	69,165	45.17	2,863	1.87
Cooch; Behar	5	Sitalkuchi (SC)	Hiten Barman	AITC	84,651	44.22	Biswanath Pramanik	CPI(M)	84,394	44.08	257	0.14
Cooch; Behar	6	Sitai (SC)	Keshab Ch. Ray	INC	79,791	46.67	Dipak Kumar Roy	AIFB	78,214	45.75	1,577	0.92
Cooch; Behar	7	Dinhata	Udayan Guha	AIFB	93,050	50.52	Dr. Md. Fazle Haque	IND	63,024	34.22	30,026	16.30
Cooch; Behar	8	Natabari	Rabindra Nath Ghosh	AITC	81,951	47.56	Tamser Ali	CPI(M)	74,386	43.17	7,565	4.39
Cooch; Behar	9	Tufanganj	Arghya Roy Pradhan	AITC	73,721	45.02	Dhananjoy Rava	CPI(M)	67,539	41.24	6,182	3.78
Alipurduar	10	Kumargram (ST)	Dasrath Tirkey	RSP	71,545	40.84	Joachim Baxla	AITC	58,964	33.66	12,581	7.18
Alipurduar	11	Kalchini (ST)	Wilson Champramary	IND	46,455	30.05	Binay Bhusan Kerketta	RSP	39,210	25.37	7,245	4.68
Alipurduar	12	Alipurduars	Debaprasad Roy	INC	79,605	46.02	Kshiti Goswami	RSP	72,822	42.10	6,783	3.92
Alipurduar	13	Falakata (SC)	Anil Adhikari	AITC	77,821	47.44	Rabindra Nath Barman	CPI(M)	69,775	42.54	8,046	4.90
Alipurduar	14	Madarihat (ST)	Kumari Kujur	RSP	42,539	31.93	Manoj Tigga	BJP	34,630	26.00	7,909	5.93
Jalpaiguri	15	Dhupguri (SC)	Mamata Roy	CPI(M)	73,644	42.25	Mina Barman	AITC	69,406	39.82	4,238	2.43
Jalpaiguri	16	Maynaguri (SC)	Ananta Deb Adhikari	RSP	84,887	48.71	Juthika Roy Basunia	AITC	68,611	39.37	16,276	9.34
Jalpaiguri	17	Jalpaiguri (SC)	Sukhbilas Barma	INC	86,273	48.64	Gobinda Chandra Roy	AIFB	75,222	42.41	11,051	6.23
Jalpaiguri	18	Rajganj (SC)	Khageswar Roy	AITC	74,546	46.64	Amulya Kumar Roy	CPI(M)	67,526	42.25	7,020	4.39
Jalpaiguri	19	Dabgram-Phulbari	Goutam Deb	AITC	84,649	48.29	Dilip Singh	CPI(M)	73,413	41.88	11,236	6.41
Jalpaiguri	20	Mal (ST)	Bulu Chik Baraik	CPI(M)	62,037	39.69	Hiraman Oraon	INC	57,821	36.99	4,216	2.70
Jalpaiguri	21	Nagrakata (ST)	Joseph Munda	INC	46,537	30.27	Sukhmoith Oraon	CPI(M)	45,774	29.77	763	0.50
Kalimpong	22	Kalimpong	Harka B. Chettri	GJM	1,09,102	87.36	Prakash Dahal	GNLF	7,427	5.95	1,01,675	81.41
Darjeeling	23	Darjeeling	Trilok Kumar Dewan	GJM	1,20,532	78.51	Bim Subba	GNLF	13,977	9.10	1,06,555	69.41
Darjeeling	24	Kurseong	Rohit Sharma	GJM	1,14,297	74.00	Pemu Chhetri	GNLF	21,201	13.73	93,096	60.27
Darjeeling	25	Matigara-Naxalbari (SC)	Sankar Malakar	INC	74,334	45.19	Jharen Roy	CPI(M)	67,501	41.04	6,833	4.15
Darjeeling	26	Siliguri	Rudranath Bhattacharya	AITC	72,019	48.08	Asok Bhattacharya	CPI(M)	67,013	44.73	5,006	3.35
Darjeeling	27	Phansidewa (ST)	Sunil Chandra Tirkey	INC	61,388	42.55	Chhotan Kisku	CPI(M)	59,151	41.00	2,237	1.55
Uttar; Dinajpur	28	Chopra	Hamidul Rahaman	IND	64,289	44.62	Anwarul Haque	CPI(M)	57,719	40.06	6,570	4.56
Uttar; Dinajpur	29	Islampur	Ab. Karim Chowdhary	AITC	49,326	41.48	Sayeda Farhat Afroz	CPI(M)	38,054	32.00	11,272	9.48
Uttar; Dinajpur	30	Goalpokhar	Md. Ghulam Rabbani	INC	61,313	49.05	Safiur Rahaman	AIFB	47,900	38.32	13,413	10.73
Uttar; Dinajpur	31	Chakulia	Ali Imran Ramz	AIFB	65,265	52.13	Serajul Islam	INC	44,852	35.82	20,413	16.31
Uttar; Dinajpur	32	Karandighi	Gokul Roy	AIFB	57,023	37.99	Subhas Goswami	INC	51,245	34.14	5,778	3.85
Uttar; Dinajpur	33	Hemtabad (SC)	Khagendra Nath Sinha	CPI(M)	71,553	45.51	Shekhar Chandra Roy	AITC	35,849	22.80	35,704	22.71
Uttar; Dinajpur	34	Kaliaganj (SC)	Pramatha Nath Ray	INC	84,873	47.59	Nani Gopal Roy	CPI(M)	77,583	43.51	7,290	4.08
Uttar; Dinajpur	35	Raiganj	Mohit Sengupta	INC	62,864	49.69	Kiranmay Nanda	SP	57,455	45.42	5,409	4.27
Uttar; Dinajpur	36	Itahar	Amal Acharjee	AITC	61,707	43.95	Srikumar Mukherjee	CPI	54,655	38.93	7,052	5.02
Dakshin; Dinajpur	37	Kushmandi (SC)	Narmada Chandra Roy	RSP	66,368	47.42	Parthasarathi Sarkar	INC	62,725	44.82	3,643	2.60
Dakshin; Dinajpur	38	Kumarganj	Begam Mahamuda	AITC	62,212	46.93	Khatun Mafuja	CPI(M)	57,994	43.75	4,218	3.18
Dakshin; Dinajpur	39	Balurghat	Chakraborty Shankar	AITC	67,495	54.27	Biswanath Choudhury	RSP	49,204	39.56	18,291	14.71
Dakshin; Dinajpur	40	Tapan (ST)	Bachchu Hansda	AITC	72,643	51.61	Khara Soren	RSP	53,986	38.36	18,657	13.25
Dakshin; Dinajpur	41	Gangarampur (SC)	Satyendra Nath Roy	AITC	65,666	45.85	Nandalal Hazra	CPI(M)	64,998	45.38	668	0.47
Dakshin; Dinajpur	42	Harirampur	Biplab Mitra	AITC	65,099	47.44	Narayan Biswas	CPI(M)	58,032	42.29	7,067	5.15
Malda	43	Habibpur (ST)	Khagen Murmu	CPI(M)	59,286	37.60	Mohan Tudu	AITC	57,028	36.17	2,258	1.43
Malda	44	Gazole (SC)	Sushil Chandra Ray	INC	74,654	46.10	Gobinda Mandal	CPI(M)	69,070	42.65	5,584	3.45
Malda	45	Chanchal	Asif Mehbub	INC	68,586	48.69	Anjuman Ara Begam	CPI(M)	54,399	38.62	14,187	10.07
Malda	46	Harischandrapur	Tajmul Hossain	AIFB	62,019	46.19	Alam Mostaque	INC	59,578	44.37	2,441	1.82
Malda	47	Malatipur	Abdur Rahim Boxi	RSP	54,794	43.44	Al-Beruni	IND	48,093	38.13	6,701	5.31
Malda	48	Ratua	Samar Mukherjee	INC	74,936	48.34	Sailen Sarkar	CPI(M)	68,075	43.92	6,861	4.42
Malda	49	Manickchak	Sabitri Mitra	AITC	64,641	46.20	Ratna Bhattacharya	CPI(M)	58,424	41.75	6,217	4.45
Malda	50	Maldaha (SC)	Bhupendra Halder	INC	68,155	46.55	Rahul Ranjan Das	CPI(M)	57,400	39.21	10,755	7.34
Malda	51	Englishbazar	Krishnendu Choudhury	INC	89,421	51.79	Samar Roy	CPI(M)	67,592	39.15	21,829	12.64
Malda	52	Mothabari	Sabina Yeasmin	INC	47,466	44.11	Naimuddin Sheikh	CPI(M)	41,446	38.52	6,020	5.59
Malda	53	Sujapur	Abu Nasar Ch.	INC	70,640	52.75	Hazi Ketabuddin	CPI(M)	53,279	39.79	17,361	12.96
Malda	54	Baishnab Nagar	Isha Khan Ch.	INC	62,589	43.02	Biswanath Ghosh	CPI(M)	57,566	39.57	5,023	3.45
Murshidabad	55	Farakka	Mainul Haque	INC	52,780	38.77	Abdus Salam	CPI(M)	48,041	35.29	4,739	3.48
Murshidabad	56	Samserganj	Touab Ali	CPI(M)	61,138	46.43	Mousumi Begum	INC	53,349	40.52	7,789	5.91
Murshidabad	57	Suti	Emani Biswas	INC	73,465	48.87	Jane Alam Mian	RSP	56,056	37.29	17,409	11.58
Murshidabad	58	Jangipur	Md. Sohrab	INC	68,699	46.76	Purnima Bhattacharya	CPI(M)	62,363	42.45	6,336	4.31
Murshidabad	59	Raghunathganj	Akhruzzaman	INC	74,683	50.99	Abul Hasnat	RSP	59,143	40.38	15,540	10.61
Murshidabad	60	Sagardighi	Subrata Saha	AITC	54,708	38.02	Ismail Sekh	CPI(M)	50,134	34.85	4,574	3.17
Murshidabad	61	Lalgola	Abu Hena	INC	74,317	51.97	Md Yean Ali	CPI(M)	58,133	40.65	16,184	11.32
Murshidabad	62	Bhagabangola	Chand Mohammad	SP	62,862	38.63	Sagir Hossain	AITC	49,528	30.43	13,334	8.20
Murshidabad	63	Raninagar	Firoza Begam	INC	76,092	46.45	Mst. Maksuda Begum	AIFB	75,003	45.79	1,089	0.66
Murshidabad	64	Murshidabad	Shaoni Singha Roy	INC	75,441	46.03	Bivas Chakraborty	AIFB	69,089	42.15	6,352	3.88
Murshidabad	65	Nabagram (SC)	Kanai Chandra Mandal	CPI(M)	78,703	48.98	Probal Sarkar	INC	71,147	44.27	7,556	4.71
Murshidabad	66	Khargram (SC)	Ashis Marjit	INC	74,093	49.96	Goutam Mondal	CPI(M)	65,123	43.91	8,970	6.05
Murshidabad	67	Burwan (SC)	Protima Rajak	INC	66,304	47.09	Binoy Sarkar	RSP	65,688	46.65	616	0.44
Murshidabad	68	Kandi	Apurba Sarkar	INC	66,513	46.10	Ainal Haque	CPI	58,703	40.68	7,810	5.42
Murshidabad	69	Bharatpur	Id Mohammad	RSP	70,658	47.78	Daliya Begum	INC	68,729	46.48	1,929	1.30
Murshidabad	70	Rejinagar	Humayun Kabir	INC	77,542	49.74	Sirajul Islam Mondal	RSP	68,781	44.12	8,761	5.62
Murshidabad	71	Beldanga	Safiujjaman Seikh	INC	67,888	45.32	Md. Refatullah	RSP	54,005	36.05	13,883	9.27
Murshidabad	72	Baharampur	Manoj Chakraborty	INC	91,578	54.90	Tarit Kumar Brahmachari	RSP	48,265	28.93	43,313	25.97
Murshidabad	73	Hariharpara	Insar Ali Biswas	CPI(M)	58,293	35.56	Niamot Sheikh	AITC	51,935	31.68	6,358	3.88
Murshidabad	74	Naoda	Abu Taher Khan	INC	80,758	51.60	Jayanta Kumar Biswas	RSP	66,963	42.79	13,795	8.81
Murshidabad	75	Domkal	Anisur Rahaman	CPI(M)	81,812	47.22	Soumik Hossain	INC	78,737	45.45	3,075	1.77
Murshidabad	76	Jalangi	Abdur Razzak	CPI(M)	85,144	49.55	Idris Ali	AITC	47,283	27.52	37,861	22.03
Nadia	77	Karimpur	Samarendranath	CPI(M)	82,244	46.17	Dr. Ramendra Nath Sarkar	AITC	77,159	43.32	5,085	2.85
Nadia	78	Tehatta	Ranjit Kumar Mandal	CPI(M)	75,445	42.78	Tapas Kumar Saha	IND	56,248	31.90	19,197	10.88
Nadia	79	Palashipara	S.M. Sadi	CPI(M)	73,619	46.12	Manik Bhattacharjee	AITC	71,967	45.09	1,652	1.03
Nadia	80	Kaliganj	Nasiruddin Ah.	AITC	74,091	47.33	Sankar Sarkar	RSP	56,913	36.35	17,178	10.98
Nadia	81	Nakashipara	Kollol Khan	AITC	79,644	48.63	Gayatri Sardar	CPI(M)	63,170	38.57	16,474	10.06
Nadia	82	Chapra	Rukbanur Rahman	AITC	77,435	47.14	Shamsul Islam Mollah	CPI(M)	74,802	45.54	2,633	1.60
Nadia	83	Krishnanagar Uttar	Abani Mohan Joardar	AITC	96,677	56.69	Ghosh Subinay	CPI(M)	61,567	36.10	35,110	20.59
Nadia	84	Nabadwip	Pundarikakshya Saha	AITC	94,117	53.45	Biswas Sumit	CPI(M)	71,282	40.49	22,835	12.96
Nadia	85	Krishnanagar Dakshin	Ujjal Biswas	AITC	71,392	46.38	Biswas Rama	CPI(M)	60,364	39.21	11,028	7.17
Nadia	86	Santipur	Ajoy Dey	INC	98,902	57.77	Iyar Mallik	RCPI(R)	60,744	35.48	38,158	22.29
Nadia	87	Ranaghat Uttar Paschim	Partha Chatterjee	AITC	1,01,395	54.41	Bhattacharya Mina	CPI(M)	74,051	39.74	27,344	14.67
Nadia	88	Krishnaganj (SC)	Sushil Biswas	AITC	96,550	52.17	Barun Biswas	CPI(M)	75,616	40.86	20,934	11.31
Nadia	89	Ranaghat Uttar Purba (SC)	Samir Kumar Poddar	AITC	93,836	55.03	Archana Biswas	CPI(M)	62,644	36.74	31,192	18.29
Nadia	90	Ranaghat Dakshin (SC)	Abir Ranjan Biswas	AITC	99,432	51.23	Aloke Kumar Das	CPI(M)	79,824	41.13	19,608	10.10
Nadia	91	Chakdaha	Naresh Chandra Chaki	AITC	88,771	51.20	Biswanath Gupta	CPI(M)	74,672	43.06	14,099	8.14
Nadia	92	Kalyani (SC)	Ramendra Biswas	AITC	92,322	51.55	Jyotsna Sarkar	CPI(M)	76,632	42.79	15,690	8.76
Nadia	93	Haringhata (SC)	Nilima Nag	AITC	83,366	49.45	Biswajit Paul	CPI(M)	70,363	41.74	13,003	7.71
North 24; Parganas	94	Bagdah (SC)	Upendra Nath Biswas	AITC	91,821	52.91	Mrinal Kanti Sikdar	AIFB	70,865	40.84	20,956	12.07
North 24; Parganas	95	Bongaon Uttar (SC)	Biswajit Das	AITC	89,265	54.55	Dr. Biswajit Kumar Biswas	CPI(M)	65,645	40.12	23,620	14.43
North 24; Parganas	96	Bongaon Dakshin (SC)	Surajit Kumar Biswas	AITC	87,677	53.71	Anuj Baran Sarkar	CPI(M)	65,788	40.30	21,889	13.41
North 24; Parganas	97	Gaighata (SC)	Manjul Krishna Thakur	AITC	91,487	55.58	Manoj Kanti Biswas	CPI	66,040	40.12	25,447	15.46
North 24; Parganas	98	Swarupnagar (SC)	Bina Mondal	AITC	83,641	48.94	Siva Pada Das	CPI(M)	76,227	44.60	7,414	4.34
North 24; Parganas	99	Baduria	Abdul Gaffar Quazi	INC	89,952	53.17	Md. Shelim Gain	CPI(M)	66,992	39.60	22,960	13.57
North 24; Parganas	100	Habra	Jyoti Priya Mallick	AITC	86,218	55.00	Pranab Bhattacharyya	CPI(M)	60,826	38.80	25,392	16.20
North 24; Parganas	101	Ashoknagar	Dhiman Roy	AITC	94,451	55.39	Satyasebi Kar	CPI(M)	66,759	39.15	27,692	16.24
North 24; Parganas	102	Amdanga	Rafiqur Rahaman	AITC	87,162	53.79	Abdus Sattar	CPI(M)	65,605	40.48	21,557	13.31
North 24; Parganas	103	Bijpur	Subhranshu Roy	AITC	65,479	51.49	Dr. Nirjharini Chakraborty	CPI(M)	52,867	41.57	12,612	9.92
North 24; Parganas	104	Naihati	Partha Bhowmick	AITC	75,482	57.39	Ranjit Kundu	CPI(M)	48,012	36.50	27,470	20.89
North 24; Parganas	105	Bhatpara	Arjun Singh	AITC	66,938	70.94	Nepaldeb Bhattacharyya	CPI(M)	22,553	23.90	44,385	47.04
North 24; Parganas	106	Jagatdal	Parash Dutta	AITC	86,388	58.80	Haripada Biswas	AIFB	50,356	34.28	36,032	24.52
North 24; Parganas	107	Noapara	Manju Basu	AITC	1,00,369	59.03	Kusadhwaj Ghosh	CPI(M)	59,221	34.83	41,148	24.20
North 24; Parganas	108	Barrackpur	Silbhadra Datta	AITC	79,515	60.02	Dr. Madhusudan Samanta	CPI(M)	43,392	32.75	36,123	27.27
North 24; Parganas	109	Khardaha	Amit Mitra	AITC	83,608	56.49	Asim Kumar Dasgupta	CPI(M)	57,454	38.82	26,154	17.67
North 24; Parganas	110	Dum Dum Uttar	Chandrima Bhattacharya	AITC	94,676	53.43	Rekha Goswami	CPI(M)	75,650	42.69	19,026	10.74
North 24; Parganas	111	Panihati	Nirmal Ghosh	AITC	88,334	58.34	Ahibhusan Chakraborty	CPI(M)	56,902	37.58	31,432	20.76
North 24; Parganas	112	Kamarhati	Madan Mitra	AITC	74,112	57.96	Manash Mukherjee	CPI(M)	49,758	38.91	24,354	19.05
North 24; Parganas	113	Baranagar	Tapas Roy	AITC	89,883	60.58	Sukumar Ghosh	RSP	53,055	35.76	36,828	24.82
North 24; Parganas	114	Dum Dum	Bratya Basu	AITC	92,635	57.50	Gautam Deb	CPI(M)	61,138	37.95	31,497	19.55
North 24; Parganas	115	Rajarhat New Town	Sabyasachi Dutta	AITC	80,738	49.23	Tapash Chatterjee	CPI(M)	72,991	44.50	7,747	4.73
North 24; Parganas	116	Bidhannagar	Sujit Bose	AITC	88,642	59.53	Palash Das	CPI(M)	52,717	35.40	35,925	24.13
North 24; Parganas	117	Rajarhat Gopalpur	Purnendu Basu	AITC	89,829	59.76	Rabindra Nath Mandal	CPI(M)	54,104	35.99	35,725	23.77
North 24; Parganas	118	Madhyamgram	Rathin Ghosh	AITC	99,841	57.18	Ranjit Chowdhury	AIFB	65,173	37.33	34,668	19.85
North 24; Parganas	119	Barasat	Chiranjeet Chakrabarti	AITC	1,03,954	58.28	Sanjib Chattopadhaya	AIFB	63,743	35.74	40,211	22.54
North 24; Parganas	120	Deganga	Dr. M. Nuruzzaman	AITC	78,395	49.39	Dr. Mortoza Hossain	AIFB	61,095	38.49	17,300	10.90
North 24; Parganas	121	Haroa	Julfikar Molla	AITC	76,627	45.70	Imtiaz Hossain	CPI(M)	75,503	45.03	1,124	0.67
North 24; Parganas	122	Minakhan (SC)	Usha Rani Mondal	AITC	73,533	48.66	Dilip Roy	CPI(M)	66,397	43.94	7,136	4.72
North 24; Parganas	123	Sandeshkhali (ST)	Nirapada Sardar	CPI(M)	66,815	43.21	Srimati Padma Mahato	AITC	62,583	40.47	4,232	2.74
North 24; Parganas	124	Basirhat Dakshin	Narayan Mukherjee	CPI(M)	66,914	35.94	Narayan Goswami	AITC	54,514	29.28	12,400	6.66
North 24; Parganas	125	Basirhat Uttar	Mostafa Bin Quasem	CPI(M)	75,575	45.19	Sardar Amjad Ali	AITC	71,632	42.83	3,943	2.36
North 24; Parganas	126	Hingalganj (SC)	Anandamay Mandal	CPI	72,741	45.75	Debes Mandal	AITC	71,726	45.11	1,015	0.64
South 24; Parganas	127	Gosaba (SC)	Jayanta Naskar	AITC	78,840	51.00	Samarendra Nath Mondal	RSP	68,158	44.09	10,682	6.91
South 24; Parganas	128	Basanti (SC)	Subhas Naskar	RSP	72,871	49.07	Arnab Ray	INC	66,636	44.87	6,235	4.20
South 24; Parganas	129	Kultali (SC)	Ramsankar Halder	CPI(M)	81,297	48.60	Joy Krishna Halder	SUCI	76,484	45.73	4,813	2.87
South 24; Parganas	130	Patharpratima	Samir Kumar Jana	AITC	95,422	52.39	Jajneswar Das	CPI(M)	80,649	44.28	14,773	8.11
South 24; Parganas	131	Kakdwip	Manturam Pakhira	AITC	84,483	51.46	Milan Bhattacharyya	CPI(M)	73,980	45.07	10,503	6.39
South 24; Parganas	132	Sagar	Bankim Chandra Hazra	AITC	94,264	50.39	Milan Parua	CPI(M)	86,115	46.03	8,149	4.36
South 24; Parganas	133	Kulpi	Jogoranjan Halder	AITC	76,693	53.75	Sakuntala Paik	CPI(M)	58,414	40.94	18,279	12.81
South 24; Parganas	134	Raidighi	Debasree Roy	AITC	93,236	49.76	Kanti Ganguly	CPI(M)	87,683	46.80	5,553	2.96
South 24; Parganas	135	Mandirbazar (SC)	Joydeb Halder	AITC	83,524	53.65	Dr. Sarat Chandra Halder	CPI(M)	64,883	41.68	18,641	11.97
South 24; Parganas	136	Joynagar (SC)	Tarun Kanti Naskar	SUCI	71,566	49.38	Shyamali Halder	CPI(M)	44,976	31.03	26,590	18.35
South 24; Parganas	137	Baruipur Purba (SC)	Nirmal Chandra Mandal	AITC	83,636	52.19	Bimal Mistry	CPI(M)	65,157	40.66	18,479	11.53
South 24; Parganas	138	Canning Paschim (SC)	Shyamal Mondal	AITC	81,736	53.35	Jaydeb Purkait	CPI(M)	62,122	40.55	19,614	12.80
South 24; Parganas	139	Canning Purba	Abdur Razzak Molla	CPI(M)	85,105	54.30	Ibrahim Molya	INC	63,992	40.83	21,113	13.47
South 24; Parganas	140	Baruipur Paschim	Biman Banerjee	AITC	88,187	57.54	Kanak Kanti Paria	CPI(M)	56,299	36.74	31,888	20.80
South 24; Parganas	141	Magrahat Purba (SC)	Namita Saha	AITC	75,217	49.68	Chandan Saha	CPI(M)	66,414	43.87	8,803	5.81
South 24; Parganas	142	Magrahat Paschim	Giasuddin Molla	AITC	66,878	47.11	Dr. Abul Hasnat	CPI(M)	54,908	38.68	11,970	8.43
South 24; Parganas	143	Diamond Harbour	Dipak Kumar Halder	AITC	87,645	53.37	Subhra Sau	CPI(M)	66,871	40.72	20,774	12.65
South 24; Parganas	144	Falta	Tamonash Ghosh	AITC	86,966	55.61	Ardhendu Sekhar Bindu	CPI(M)	59,295	37.92	27,671	17.69
South 24; Parganas	145	Satgachia	Sonali Guha (Bose)	AITC	93,902	51.18	Barun Naskar	CPI(M)	75,792	41.31	18,110	9.87
South 24; Parganas	146	Bishnupur (SC)	Dilip Mondal	AITC	95,912	53.92	Sudhin Sinha	CPI(M)	70,862	39.83	25,050	14.09
South 24; Parganas	147	Sonarpur Dakshin	Jiban Mukhopadhyay	AITC	1,00,243	59.03	Tarit Chakraborty (Saheb)	CPI	62,469	36.79	37,774	22.24
South 24; Parganas	148	Bhangore	Badal Jamadar	CPI(M)	81,965	47.33	Arabul Islam	AITC	76,859	44.38	5,106	2.95
South 24; Parganas	149	Kasba	Ahmed Javed Khan	AITC	92,460	53.81	Shatarup Ghosh	CPI(M)	72,571	42.23	19,889	11.58
South 24; Parganas	150	Jadavpur	Manish Gupta	AITC	1,03,972	52.65	Buddhadeb Bhattacharjee	CPI(M)	87,288	44.20	16,684	8.45
South 24; Parganas	151	Sonarpur Uttar	Firdousi Begum	AITC	89,841	55.40	Shyamal Naskar	CPI(M)	63,817	39.36	26,024	16.04
South 24; Parganas	152	Tollygunj	Aroop Biswas	AITC	1,02,743	56.17	Partha Pratim Biswas	CPI(M)	75,063	41.04	27,680	15.13
South 24; Parganas	153	Behala Purba	Sovan Chatterjee	AITC	1,16,709	60.28	Kumkum Chakraborti	CPI(M)	68,536	35.40	48,173	24.88
South 24; Parganas	154	Behala Paschim	Partha Chatterjee	AITC	1,27,870	62.96	Anupam Debsarkar	CPI(M)	68,849	33.90	59,021	29.06
South 24; Parganas	155	Maheshtala	Kasturi Das	AITC	92,211	52.50	Sk. Md. Israil	CPI(M)	67,928	38.67	24,283	13.83
South 24; Parganas	156	Budge Budge	Ashok Kumar Deb	AITC	99,915	60.04	Hrishikesh Podder	CPI(M)	53,426	32.11	46,489	27.93
South 24; Parganas	157	Metiaburuz	Mamtaj Begam	AITC	55,003	41.56	Badruddoza Molla	CPI(M)	48,409	36.58	6,594	4.98
Kolkata	158	Kolkata Port	Firhad Hakim	AITC	63,866	48.64	Moinuddin Shams	AIFB	38,833	29.57	25,033	19.07
Kolkata	159	Bhabanipur	Subrata Bakshi	AITC	87,903	64.77	Narayan Prasad Jain	CPI(M)	37,967	27.98	49,936	36.79
Kolkata	160	Rashbehari	Sobhandeb Chattopadhyay	AITC	88,892	65.55	Shantanu Basu	CPI(M)	38,998	28.76	49,894	36.79
Kolkata	161	Ballygunge	Subrata Mukherjee	AITC	88,194	60.65	Dr. Fuad Halim	CPI(M)	47,009	32.33	41,185	28.32
Kolkata	162	Chowrangee	Sikha Chowdhury (Mitra)	AITC	79,450	71.90	Bimal Singh	RJD	21,711	19.65	57,739	52.25
Kolkata	163	Entally	Swarna Kamal Saha	AITC	75,891	56.24	Debesh Das	CPI(M)	50,895	37.71	24,996	18.53
Kolkata	164	Beleghata	Paresh Paul	AITC	93,185	57.45	Anadi Kumar Sahu	CPI(M)	61,497	37.92	31,688	19.53
Kolkata	165	Jorasanko	Smita Bakshi	AITC	57,970	51.11	Janki Singh	CPI(M)	26,461	23.33	31,509	27.78
Kolkata	166	Shyampukur	Dr. Shashi Panja	AITC	72,904	57.97	Jiban Prakash Saha	AIFB	45,868	36.47	27,036	21.50
Kolkata	167	Maniktala	Sadhan Pande	AITC	89,039	60.05	Rupa Bagchi	CPI(M)	52,489	35.40	36,550	24.65
Kolkata	168	Kashipur-Belgachia	Mala Saha	AITC	87,408	61.68	Kaninika Ghosh (Bose)	CPI(M)	47,124	33.25	40,284	28.43
Howrah	169	Bally	Sultan Singh	AITC	52,770	50.42	Kanika Ganguly	CPI(M)	46,170	44.11	6,600	6.31
Howrah	170	Howrah Uttar	Asok Ghosh	AITC	61,466	49.25	Nimai Samanta	CPI(M)	41,858	33.54	19,608	15.71
Howrah	171	Howrah Madhya	Arup Roy (Apu)	AITC	1,03,184	62.07	Arup Ray (Tukun)	CPI(M)	52,514	31.59	50,670	30.48
Howrah	172	Shibpur	Jatu Lahiri	AITC	1,00,739	61.83	Jagannath Bhattacharyya	AIFB	54,335	33.35	46,404	28.48
Howrah	173	Howrah Dakshin	Brajamohan Majumder	AITC	1,01,066	56.06	K. K. Ray	CPI(M)	69,644	38.63	31,422	17.43
Howrah	174	Sankrail (SC)	Sital Kumar Sardar	AITC	88,029	51.21	Dr. Anirban Hazra	CPI(M)	70,172	40.82	17,857	10.39
Howrah	175	Panchla	Gulsan Mullick	AITC	76,628	45.76	Doli Roy	AIFB	64,510	38.53	12,118	7.23
Howrah	176	Uluberia Purba	Haider Aziz Safwi	AITC	68,975	46.48	Mohan Mondal	CPI(M)	49,391	33.28	19,584	13.20
Howrah	177	Uluberia Uttar (SC)	Dr. Nirmal Maji	AITC	76,469	52.45	Ghuku Bhim	CPI(M)	58,021	39.79	18,448	12.66
Howrah	178	Uluberia Dakshin	Pulak Roy	AITC	73,734	49.48	Ahmed Kutubuddin Sk.	AIFB	61,902	41.54	11,832	7.94
Howrah	179	Shyampur	Kalipada Mandal	AITC	99,501	56.64	Minati Pramanik	AIFB	64,882	36.94	34,619	19.70
Howrah	180	Bagnan	Arunava Sen (Raja)	AITC	82,730	53.55	Akkel Ali Khan	CPI(M)	63,460	41.08	19,270	12.47
Howrah	181	Amta	Asit Mitra	INC	88,264	51.82	Rabindranath Mitra	CPI(M)	74,545	43.76	13,719	8.06
Howrah	182	Udaynarayanpur	Samir Kumar Panja	AITC	91,879	55.11	Chandralekha Bag	CPI(M)	67,988	40.78	23,891	14.33
Howrah	183	Jagatballavpur	Abul Kasem Molla	AITC	1,02,580	54.19	Kazi Jafar Ahmed	CPI(M)	74,800	39.51	27,780	14.68
Howrah	184	Domjur	Rajib Banerjee	AITC	1,01,042	54.07	Mohanta Chatterjee	CPI(M)	76,056	40.70	24,986	13.37
Hooghly	185	Uttarpara	Anup Ghosal	AITC	1,04,753	59.77	Srutinath Praharaj	CPI(M)	61,560	35.12	43,193	24.65
Hooghly	186	Sreerampur	Dr. Sudipto Roy	AITC	97,540	63.83	Partha Sarathi Rej	CPI	45,849	30.00	51,691	33.83
Hooghly	187	Champdani	Muzaffar Khan	AITC	92,476	57.16	Jibesh Chakraborty	CPI(M)	56,163	34.72	36,313	22.44
Hooghly	188	Singur	Rabindranath Bhattacharya	AITC	1,00,869	57.61	Dr. Asit Das	CPI(M)	66,058	37.73	34,811	19.88
Hooghly	189	Chandannagore	Ashok Kumar Shaw	AITC	96,430	60.76	Siba Bandyopadhyay	CPI(M)	53,391	33.64	43,039	27.12
Hooghly	190	Chunchura	Asit Mazumder (Tapan)	AITC	1,27,206	56.90	Naren Dey	AIFB	82,614	36.95	44,592	19.95
Hooghly	191	Balagarh (SC)	Asim Kumar Majhi	AITC	96,254	52.35	Bhuban Pramanick	CPI(M)	74,671	40.61	21,583	11.74
Hooghly	192	Pandua	Amjad Hossain Sk.	CPI(M)	84,830	46.64	Nargis Begum	AITC	84,433	46.42	397	0.22
Hooghly	193	Saptagram	Tapan Dasgupta	AITC	90,289	56.51	Ashutosh Mukhopadhyay	CPI(M)	59,421	37.19	30,868	19.32
Hooghly	194	Chanditala	Swati Khandoker	AITC	86,394	52.46	Azim Ali Md Sk	CPI(M)	69,474	42.18	16,920	10.28
Hooghly	195	Jangipara	Snehasis Chakraborty	AITC	87,133	50.54	Sudarsan Raychaudhuri	CPI(M)	74,057	42.95	13,076	7.59
Hooghly	196	Haripal	Becharam Manna	AITC	98,146	53.70	Bharati Mukherjee	CPI(M)	76,073	41.62	22,073	12.08
Hooghly	197	Dhanekhali (SC)	Asima Patra	AITC	1,00,529	51.18	Shrabani Sarkar	AIFB	84,252	42.89	16,277	8.29
Hooghly	198	Tarakeswar	Rachhpal Singh	AITC	97,022	55.10	Pratim Chatterjee	CPI(M)	71,550	40.64	25,472	14.46
Hooghly	199	Pursurah	Parvez Rahman	AITC	1,07,794	56.26	Saumendranath Bera	CPI(M)	76,104	39.72	31,690	16.54
Hooghly	200	Arambag (SC)	Krishna Chandra Santra	AITC	98,011	53.37	Asit Kumar Malik	CPI(M)	78,448	42.72	19,563	10.65
Hooghly	201	Goghat (SC)	Karak Biswanath	AIFB	86,514	49.04	Debasish Medda	INC	82,249	46.62	4,265	2.42
Hooghly	202	Khanakul	Iqbal Ahmed	AITC	1,02,450	55.56	Subhra Parui	CPI(M)	74,571	40.44	27,879	15.12
Purba; Medinipur	203	Tamluk	Saumen Kumar Mahapatra	AITC	99,765	52.82	Jagannath Mitra	CPI	79,089	41.88	20,676	10.94
Purba; Medinipur	204	Panskura Purba	Biplab Roy Chowdhury	AITC	82,957	50.71	Amiya Kumar Sahoo	CPI(M)	69,790	42.66	13,167	8.05
Purba; Medinipur	205	Panskura Paschim	Omar Ali	AITC	93,349	49.97	Nirmal Kumar Bera	CPI	84,209	45.08	9,140	4.89
Purba; Medinipur	206	Moyna	Bhushan Chandra Dolai	AITC	91,038	50.95	Sk. Mujibur Rahaman	CPI(M)	81,081	45.38	9,957	5.57
Purba; Medinipur	207	Nandakumar	Sukumar De	AITC	89,717	50.94	Brahmamay Nanda	SP	77,850	44.20	11,867	6.74
Purba; Medinipur	208	Mahisadal	Sudarsan Ghosh Dastidar	AITC	95,640	55.29	Tamalika Ponda Seth	CPI(M)	67,478	39.01	28,162	16.28
Purba; Medinipur	209	Haldia (SC)	Seuli Saha	AITC	89,573	51.34	Nityananda Bera	CPI(M)	77,649	44.51	11,924	6.83
Purba; Medinipur	210	Nandigram	Phiroja Bibi	AITC	1,03,300	60.17	Paramananda Bharati	CPI	59,660	34.75	43,640	25.42
Purba; Medinipur	211	Chandipur	Amiya Bhattacharjee	AITC	88,010	50.80	Bidyut Guchhait	CPI(M)	76,301	44.04	11,709	6.76
Purba; Medinipur	212	Patashpur	Jyotirmoy Kar	AITC	84,452	49.93	Makhan Lal Nayak	CPI	77,802	46.00	6,650	3.93
Purba; Medinipur	213	Kanthi Uttar	Banasri Maity	AITC	91,528	49.78	Chakradhar Maikap	CPI(M)	83,573	45.45	7,955	4.33
Purba; Medinipur	214	Bhagabanpur	Ardhendu Maity	AITC	93,945	51.15	Ranajit Manna	SP	84,948	46.25	8,997	4.90
Purba; Medinipur	215	Khejuri (SC)	Ranajit Mondal	AITC	87,833	53.11	Asim Kumar Mandal	SP	71,673	43.34	16,160	9.77
Purba; Medinipur	216	Kanthi Dakshin	Dibyendu Adhikari	AITC	86,933	57.12	Uttam Pradhan	CPI	58,296	38.31	28,637	18.81
Purba; Medinipur	217	Ramnagar	Akhil Giri	AITC	93,801	52.56	Swadesh Ranjan Nayak	CPI(M)	77,242	43.28	16,559	9.28
Purba; Medinipur	218	Egra	Das Samares	AITC	99,178	51.57	Hrishikesh Paria	DSP(P)	83,225	43.27	15,953	8.30
Paschim; Medinipur	219	Dantan	Arun Mohapatra	CPI	79,118	49.35	Shaibal Giri	AITC	74,468	46.45	4,650	2.90
Jhargram	220	Nayagram (ST)	Dulal Murmu	AITC	75,656	50.34	Bhutnath Saren	CPI(M)	59,382	39.51	16,274	10.83
Jhargram	221	Gopiballavpur	Chudamani Mahato	AITC	90,070	56.70	Rabi Lal Maitra	CPI(M)	58,050	36.55	32,020	20.15
Jhargram	222	Jhargram	Sukumar Hansda	AITC	69,464	44.67	Amar Basu	CPI(M)	54,191	34.85	15,273	9.82
Paschim; Medinipur	223	Keshiary (ST)	Biram Mandi	CPI(M)	76,976	45.97	Shyam Charan Mandi	AITC	75,939	45.35	1,037	0.62
Paschim; Medinipur	224	Kharagpur Sadar	Gyan Singh Sohanpal	INC	75,425	55.06	Anil Kumar Das	CPI(M)	43,056	31.43	32,369	23.63
Paschim; Medinipur	225	Narayangarh	Surjya Kanta Mishra	CPI(M)	89,804	50.50	Atta Surja Kanta	AITC	82,695	46.50	7,109	4.00
Paschim; Medinipur	226	Sabang	Manas Ranjan Bhunia	INC	98,755	51.25	Rampada Sahoo	CPI(M)	85,571	44.41	13,184	6.84
Paschim; Medinipur	227	Pingla	Prabodh Chandra Sinha	DSP(P)	84,738	47.24	Ajit Maity	AITC	83,504	46.56	1,234	0.68
Paschim; Medinipur	228	Kharagpur	Haque Nazmul	CPI(M)	70,178	46.78	Bilkis Khanam	AITC	67,674	45.11	2,504	1.67
Paschim; Medinipur	229	Debra	Radhakanta Maiti	AITC	86,215	50.57	Sk. Sorab Hossein	CPI(M)	77,402	45.40	8,813	5.17
Paschim; Medinipur	230	Daspur	Ajit Bhunia	AITC	1,09,048	54.76	Sunil Adhikari	CPI(M)	84,121	42.24	24,927	12.52
Paschim; Medinipur	231	Ghatal (SC)	Shankar Dolai	AITC	1,01,355	52.24	Chhabi Pakhira	CPI(M)	85,078	43.85	16,277	8.39
Paschim; Medinipur	232	Chandrakona (SC)	Chhaya Dolai	CPI(M)	97,280	48.39	Sibaram Das	AITC	95,984	47.75	1,296	0.64
Paschim; Medinipur	233	Garbeta	Ghosh Susanta	CPI(M)	86,047	52.23	Hema Choubey	INC	70,977	43.08	15,070	9.15
Paschim; Medinipur	234	Salboni	Srikanta Mahata	AITC	92,082	47.54	Abhiram Mahata	CPI(M)	87,727	45.29	4,355	2.25
Paschim; Medinipur	235	Keshpur (SC)	Rameswar Doloi	CPI(M)	1,03,901	57.58	Rajani Kanta Doloi	INC	70,059	38.82	33,842	18.76
Paschim; Medinipur	236	Medinipur	Mrigendra Nath Maiti	AITC	1,03,060	54.43	Santosh Rana	CPI	74,840	39.53	28,220	14.90
Jhargram	237	Binpur (ST)	Dibakar Hansda	CPI(M)	60,728	41.17	Chunibala Hansda	JKP(N)	53,118	36.01	7,610	5.16
Purulia	238	Bandwan (ST)	Besra Susanta	CPI(M)	87,183	48.38	Sital Chandra Hembram	INC	65,163	36.16	22,020	12.22
Purulia	239	Balarampur	Shantiram Mahato	AITC	65,244	45.79	Gope Manindra	CPI(M)	54,716	38.40	10,528	7.39
Purulia	240	Baghmundi	Nepal Mahata	INC	77,458	49.48	Mangal Mahato	AIFB	59,814	38.21	17,644	11.27
Purulia	241	Joypur	Dhirendra Nath Mahato	AIFB	62,060	41.48	Shakti Pada Mahato	IND	51,449	34.39	10,611	7.09
Purulia	242	Purulia	K. P. Singh Deo	AITC	83,396	53.95	Kaushik Mazumdar	CPI(M)	56,909	36.81	26,487	17.14
Purulia	243	Manbazar (ST)	Sandhyarani Tudu	AITC	78,520	47.02	Himani Hansda	CPI(M)	73,354	43.93	5,166	3.09
Purulia	244	Kashipur	Swapan Kumar Belthariya	AITC	69,492	44.73	Subhas Chandra Mahata	CPI(M)	65,771	42.33	3,721	2.40
Purulia	245	Para (SC)	Umapada Bauri	INC	62,208	42.60	Dipak Bauri	CPI(M)	61,622	42.20	586	0.40
Purulia	246	Raghunathpur (SC)	Purna Chandra Bauri	AITC	78,096	48.34	Dipali Bauri	CPI(M)	65,353	40.46	12,743	7.88
Bankura	247	Saltora (SC)	Swapan Bouri	AITC	82,597	50.60	Sasthi Charan Bauri	CPI(M)	69,900	42.82	12,697	7.78
Bankura	248	Chhatna	Subhasis Batabyal	AITC	70,340	45.58	Anath Bandhu Mondal	RSP	62,576	40.55	7,764	5.03
Bankura	249	Ranibundh (ST)	Debalina Hembram	CPI(M)	75,388	44.25	Falguni Hembram	AITC	68,529	40.22	6,859	4.03
Bankura	250	Raipur (ST)	Upen Kisku	CPI(M)	69,008	44.38	Pramila Murmu	AITC	68,826	44.26	182	0.12
Bankura	251	Taldangra	Manoranjan Patra	CPI(M)	74,779	47.59	Arun Kumar Pathak	INC	67,614	43.03	7,165	4.56
Bankura	252	Bankura	Kashinath Mishra	AITC	92,835	53.93	Pratip Mukherjee	CPI(M)	63,745	37.03	29,090	16.90
Bankura	253	Barjora	Asutosh Mukherjee	AITC	84,457	47.69	Susmita Biswas	CPI(M)	75,966	42.89	8,491	4.80
Bankura	254	Onda	Arup Kumar Khan	AITC	75,699	43.50	Tarapada Chakrabarti	AIFB	75,103	43.16	596	0.34
Bankura	255	Bishnupur	Shyama Prasad Mukherjee	AITC	77,662	50.30	Ghosh Swapan	CPI(M)	67,805	43.91	9,857	6.39
Bankura	256	Katulpur (SC)	Khan Saumitra	INC	83,355	47.40	Purnima Bagdi	CPI(M)	81,922	46.59	1,433	0.81
Bankura	257	Indus (SC)	Gurupada Mete	AITC	85,589	49.05	Santanu Kumar Bora	CPI(M)	81,584	46.76	4,005	2.29
Bankura	258	Sonamukhi (SC)	Dipali Saha	AITC	82,199	49.80	Chongre Manoranjan	CPI(M)	74,910	45.38	7,289	4.42
Purba; Bardhaman	259	Khandaghosh (SC)	Nabin Chandra Bag	CPI(M)	94,284	52.11	Alok Kumar Majhi	AITC	81,137	44.85	13,147	7.26
Purba; Bardhaman	260	Bardhaman Dakshin	Rabiranjan Chattopadhyay	AITC	1,07,520	57.70	Nirupam Sen	CPI(M)	70,604	37.89	36,916	19.81
Purba; Bardhaman	261	Raina (SC)	Khan Basudeb	CPI(M)	98,897	51.12	Nepal Ghorui	AITC	86,676	44.80	12,221	6.32
Purba; Bardhaman	262	Jamalpur (SC)	Ujjal Pramanick	AITC	84,434	48.73	Samar Hazra	CPI(M)	81,891	47.27	2,543	1.46
Purba; Bardhaman	263	Monteswar	Ch Md Hedayatullah	CPI(M)	81,822	47.24	Abu Ayesh Mondal	AITC	78,524	45.34	3,298	1.90
Purba; Bardhaman	264	Kalna (SC)	Kundu Biswajit	AITC	85,096	49.98	Sukul Chandra Sikdar	CPI(M)	72,459	42.56	12,637	7.42
Purba; Bardhaman	265	Memari	Abul Hasem Mondal	AITC	89,083	48.24	Debashis Ghosh	CPI(M)	85,905	46.52	3,178	1.72
Purba; Bardhaman	266	Bardhaman Uttar (SC)	Aparna Saha	CPI(M)	98,182	50.87	Nisith Kumar Malik	AITC	83,949	43.50	14,233	7.37
Purba; Bardhaman	267	Bhatar	Banamali Hazra	AITC	83,883	47.29	Konar Srijit	CPI(M)	83,585	47.12	298	0.17
Purba; Bardhaman	268	Purbasthali Dakshin	Swapan Debnath	AITC	86,039	49.72	Aleya Begam Sekh	CPI(M)	70,181	40.56	15,858	9.16
Purba; Bardhaman	269	Purbasthali Uttar	Tapan Chatterjee	AITC	71,107	42.63	Pradip Kumar Saha	CPI(M)	68,967	41.35	2,140	1.28
Purba; Bardhaman	270	Katwa	Rabindranath Chatterjee	INC	97,951	52.53	Sudipta Bagchi	CPI(M)	70,426	37.77	27,525	14.76
Purba; Bardhaman	271	Ketugram	Sekh Sahonawez	AITC	77,323	45.70	Abul Kadar Syed	CPI(M)	75,724	44.75	1,599	0.95
Purba; Bardhaman	272	Mangalkot	Sahajahan Choudhury	CPI(M)	81,316	46.22	Apurba Chaudhuri	AITC	81,190	46.15	126	0.07
Purba; Bardhaman	273	Ausgram (SC)	Basudev Mete	CPI(M)	90,863	52.21	Chanchal Kumar Mondal	INC	67,767	38.94	23,096	13.27
Purba; Bardhaman	274	Galsi (SC)	Sunil Kumar Mondal	AIFB	92,126	50.59	Joydeb Saha	AITC	81,272	44.63	10,854	5.96
Paschim; Bardhaman	275	Pandabeswar	Gauranga Chatterjee	CPI(M)	67,240	49.69	Zahir Alam	AITC	59,429	43.92	7,811	5.77
Paschim; Bardhaman	276	Durgapur Purba	Dr. Nikhil Kumar Banerjee	AITC	87,050	50.32	Alpana Chowdhury	CPI(M)	78,484	45.37	8,566	4.95
Paschim; Bardhaman	277	Durgapur Paschim	Apurba Mukherjee	AITC	92,454	51.94	Biprendu Chakraborty	CPI(M)	75,448	42.38	17,006	9.56
Paschim; Bardhaman	278	Raniganj	Ali Sohrab	AITC	73,810	47.83	Runu Dutta	CPI(M)	72,059	46.70	1,751	1.13
Paschim; Bardhaman	279	Jamuria	Jahanara Khan	CPI(M)	72,411	52.82	Prabhat Kumar Chatterjee	AITC	58,538	42.70	13,873	10.12
Paschim; Bardhaman	280	Asansol Dakshin	Tapas Banerjee	AITC	89,645	55.75	Ashok Kumar Mukherjee	CPI(M)	61,104	38.00	28,541	17.75
Paschim; Bardhaman	281	Asansol Uttar	Ghatak Moloy	AITC	96,011	62.14	Ranu Roychowdhury	CPI(M)	48,218	31.21	47,793	30.93
Paschim; Bardhaman	282	Kulti	Ujjal Chatterjee	AITC	77,610	56.09	Acharya Maniklal	AIFB	49,044	35.45	28,566	20.64
Paschim; Bardhaman	283	Barbani	Bidhan Upadhyay	AITC	78,628	52.92	Abhas Raychaudhuri	CPI(M)	58,051	39.07	20,577	13.85
Birbhum	284	Dubrajpur (SC)	Bijoy Bagdi	AIFB	75,347	47.67	Santoshi Saha	AITC	72,634	45.95	2,713	1.72
Birbhum	285	Suri	Swapan Kanti Ghosh	AITC	88,244	51.57	Abdul Gaffar	CPI(M)	69,127	40.40	19,117	11.17
Birbhum	286	Bolpur	Chandra Nath Sinha	AITC	89,394	50.51	Tapan Hore	RSP	72,767	41.11	16,627	9.40
Birbhum	287	Nanoor (SC)	Gadadhar Hazra	AITC	91,818	49.21	Shyamali Pradhan	CPI(M)	85,955	46.07	5,863	3.14
Birbhum	288	Labhpur	Islam Monirul	AITC	78,697	47.68	Nabanita Mukherjee	CPI(M)	75,691	45.86	3,006	1.82
Birbhum	289	Sainthia (SC)	Dhiren Bagdi	CPI(M)	77,512	46.91	Parikshit Bala	AITC	73,194	44.29	4,318	2.62
Birbhum	290	Mayureswar	Asok Ray	CPI(M)	67,478	42.31	Jatil Mondal	AITC	60,958	38.23	6,520	4.08
Birbhum	291	Rampurhat	Asish Banerjee	AITC	75,066	45.80	Rebati Bhattacharya	AIFB	64,828	39.55	10,238	6.25
Birbhum	292	Hansan	Asit Mal	INC	73,370	46.73	Kamal Hasan	RCPI(R)	46,918	29.88	26,452	16.85
Birbhum	293	Nalhati	Abhijit Mukherjee	INC	76,047	49.03	Dipak Chatterjee	AIFB	60,887	39.25	15,160	9.78
Birbhum	294	Murarai	Nure Alam Chowdhury	AITC	77,817	47.75	Elahi Kamre Dr	CPI(M)	73,414	45.05	4,403	2.70

=== Results by District ===
District	Seats				
District	Seats	UPA	Left	NDA	OTH
Cooch Behar	9	5	4	0	0
Alipurduar	5	2	2	1	0
Jalpaiguri	7	4	3	0	0
Kalimpong	1	0	0	1	0
Darjeeling	5	3	0	2	0
Uttar Dinajpur	9	5	3	0	1
Dakshin Dinajpur	6	5	1	0	0
Malda	12	9	3	0	0
Murshidabad	22	15	7	0	0
Nadia	17	14	3	0	0
North 24 Parganas	33	29	4	0	0
South 24 Parganas	31	26	4	0	1
Kolkata	11	11	0	0	0
Howrah	16	16	0	0	0
Hooghly	18	16	2	0	0
Purba Medinipur	16	16	0	0	0
Paschim Medinipur	15	7	8	0	0
Jhargram	4	3	1	0	0
Purulia	9	7	2	0	0
Bankura	12	9	3	0	0
Purba Bardhaman	16	9	7	0	0
Paschim Bardhaman	9	7	2	0	0
Birbhum	11	8	3	0	0
Total	294	226	62	4	2

== Reactions ==
=== Domestic ===
Mamata Banerjee's Oath of Office
Taking the Oath at Raj Bhavan, Kolkata
Mamata Banerjee takes the oath of office
as Chief Minister administered by Governor M. K. Narayanan on 20 May 2011.

- AITC's Mamata Banerjee responded to her victory saying "This is a victory of democracy, victory of Maa, Maati, Manush (mother, land and people). There will be end of autocracy and atrocities." (sic) She thanked the INC chief Sonia Gandhi, who sent congratulatory messages, and Prime Minister Manmohan Singh: "The Prime Minister sent me a congratulatory message from Afghanistan for our victory. I am overwhelmed. I am grateful to him." She also said that the day marked "Communism [a]s history in Bengal, we have won a decisive victory. This is a day of liberation for our people." She also added that the TMC intended to emphasize a return to "true democracy that has been undermined by the communist politics of control" and that her government would promote what she termed a more "inclusive development that benefits rural and urban poor by balancing allocations between agriculture and industry" while seeking a more "efficient" government "especially in terms of maintaining law and order in what has become a fairly violent state." She said "I will continue to live like a commoner because I don't like a luxury. The support of my people is more important. I am against the Left here but not against Leftism. I share the values of the old Left."
- West Bengal CPIM leader Biman Bose said that "We are down, but not out. We will perform our role in opposition and win back the people's trust...[as in Tripura] where the Communists messed up and people brought us back. That will happen in Bengal. They went out of power in 1988 and came back to power five years later...ruling it until now.""
- On CNN-IBN BJP leader Arun Jaitley and fellow national cabinet member Kapil Sibal congratulated Banerjee for the TMC's victory.

=== International ===
- Bangladesh: Fellow Bengali and Bangladeshi Prime Minister Sheikh Hasina offered her congratulations to Banerjee. Banerjee told the press that "Sheikh Hasinaji called me and congratulated us on behalf of the people of Bangladesh. I told her our relations have been since the time of Bangabandhu (Mujibur Rahman) and told her that we will work together for betterment. I quoted from Rabindranath Tagore's ‘Amar Sonar Bangla Ami Tomay Bhalobashi’ and told her that both Bangladesh and West Bengal will flourish." (sic)

=== Media ===
In the media, she was dubbed as "India's Lech Wałęsa." Editor Prabhu Chawla said that "Their (Communist) future in Indian politics is in jeopardy. This is an obsolete ideology and will not work here anymore."

Tarun Vijay, the editor of the Organiser Weekly said that "Now Indian politics at the federal level will be more bipolar - with the Congress leading one coalition and the Hindu nationalist BJP leading the other."

Al Jazeera said that the only hope for a Communist resurgence is "if Banerji, whose performance as India's railway minister has not been overly impressive, fails in her position of governance." It also said Banerjee's "austere lifestyle appears closer to the old icons of the Bengal communist movement than their successors who had become corrupted by three decades of power."

=== Academia ===
Sabyasachi Basu Roy Choudhury of the Calcutta Research Group said that the election was "the most dramatic reversal of fortunes in Bengal's history...The anti-left mass got a powerful leader in Mamata Banerjee and she started to reach out to the floating voters, issue by issue. That explains why the tide has turned against the communists...Bengal's communism was unique in that it grew among the people not through armed revolution. This was a party that grew by consensus by carrying with them all sections of the middle class, rural and urban poor - even the gentry. But somewhere down the line, the arrogance of power led them to adopt narrow, sectarian politics and that is their undoing now."

Pradip Bose said of the results reasons that: "How could a communist government ask the police to fire on peasants as they did in Nandigram to set up a chemical industry. That has eroded their support amongst the rural poor and Mamata Banerji has gained by leading campaigns against the acquisitions." But according to the latest CBI reports, the then C.M. Buddhadev Bhattacharya was awarded a clean-chit for falsely-held allegations of Nandigram police firing against him and his party. Economist Bibek Debroy said that "The Communists were functioning within the parameters of Indian democracy but they tried to create a party whereby they could control all segments of Bengali society. They are paying dearly for their obsession for control because the fiercely independent Bengali middle class would take it no more." Ranabir Sammadar said that: "Within thirteen years of breaking away from the Congress and forming her Trinmool Congress, she has marginalized the Congress in Bengal as much as the communists now. That's a major achievement." Paula Banerji said of the win that it was a "demonstration of the political power of the Bengali women. Now Banerjee has done 'a Hasina' in our state. (sic) Both the Bengals will now be ruled by women and in Bangladesh, even the main opposition leader is a woman. The communists don't have a female leader of Banerji's stature and unless they find one, they cannot take her on."

== Analysis ==
The election result was read as having a significant impact on the national political scene as it effectively destroyed the importance of the CPI(M) in national politics.

The election marked the defeat of the 34-year rule of the CPI (M) government, thereby marking an end to the world's longest-serving democratically elected communist government.

== Bypolls (2011–2016) ==
S.No	Date	Constituency	MLA before election	Party before election	Elected MLA	Party after election
125	25 September 2011	Basirhat Uttar	Mostafa Bin Qaseem	Communist Party of India (Marxist)	ATM Abdullah	Trinamool Congress
159	25 September 2011	Bhabanipur	Subrata Bakshi	Trinamool Congress	Mamata Banerjee	Trinamool Congress
230	12 June 2012	Daspur	Ajit Bhunia	Trinamool Congress	Mamata Bhunia	Trinamool Congress
252	12 June 2012	Bankura	Kashinath Misra	Trinamool Congress	Minati Misra	Trinamool Congress
51	23 February 2013	English Bazar	Krishnendu Narayan Choudhury	Indian National Congress	Krishnendu Narayan Choudhury	Trinamool Congress
70	23 February 2013	Rejinagar	Humayun Kabir	Indian National Congress	Rabiul Alam Chowdhury	Indian National Congress
293	23 February 2013	Nalhati	Abhijit Mukherjee	Indian National Congress	Dipak Chatterjee	All India Forward Bloc
16	17 April 2014	Maynaguri	Ananta Deb Adhikari	Revolutionary Socialist Party (India)	Ananta Deb Adhikari	Trinamool Congress
124	13 September 2014	Basirhat Dakshin	Narayan Mukherjee	Communist Party of India (Marxist)	Samik Bhattacharya	Bharatiya Janata Party
162	13 September 2014	Chowrangee	Sikha Mitra Mukherjee	Trinamool Congress	Nayna Bandopadhyay	Trinamool Congress
88	13 February 2015	Krishnaganj	Sushil Biswas	Trinamool Congress	Satyajit Biswas	Trinamool Congress
