= Protima Rajak =

Indian politician

Protima Rajak (born 1978) is an Indian politician from West Bengal. She is a former member of the West Bengal Legislative Assembly from Burwan Assembly constituency which is reserved for Scheduled Caste community in Murshidabad district. She won for the first time in the 2016 West Bengal Legislative Assembly election representing the Indian National Congress.

== Early life and education ==
Rajak is from Burwan, Murshidabad district, West Bengal. She married Kanuhari Rajak. She completed her BA at a college affiliated with the University of Kolkata in 1998. She is an ICDS worker.

== Career ==
Rajak was elected from the Burwan Assembly constituency representing the Indian National Congress in the 2016 West Bengal Legislative Assembly election. She polled 55,906 votes and defeated her nearest rival, Shasthi Charan Mal of the All India Trinamool Congress, by a margin of 15,002 votes. She became an MLA for the first time winning the 2011 West Bengal Legislative Assembly election where she polled 66,034 votes. In March 2021, she resigned from the Congress party.
