= Nirmal Khanra =

Indian politician (born 1986)

Nirmal Khanra (born 1986) is an Indian politician from West Bengal. He is a member of the West Bengal Legislative Assembly from the Nandakumar Assembly constituency in Purba Medinipur district representing the Bharatiya Janata Party.

== Early life and education ==
Khanra is from Nandakumar, Purba Medinipur district, West Bengal. He is the son of the Satish Khanra. He completed his Master of Arts in education and later, did his Bachelor of Education at Fakir Chand College, Kolkata, in 2010. Both he and his wife are teachers. He declared assets worth Rs.1 crore in his affidavit to the Election Commission of India.

== Career ==
Khanra won the Nandakumar Assembly constituency representing the Bharatiya Janata Party in the 2026 West Bengal Legislative Assembly election. He polled 1,31,476 and defeated his nearest rival and sitting MLA, Sukumar De of the All India Trinamool Congress by a margin of 15,243 votes.
