= Shyamali Pradhan =

Indian politician

Member of West Bengal Legislative Assembly
- In office 2016–2021
- Preceded by: Gadhadhar Hazra
- Succeeded by: Bidhan Chandra Majhi
- Constituency: Nanoor constituency

Personal details
- Born: 2 August 1972 (age 54)
- Party: Communist Party of India (Marxist)
- Education: University of Burdwan

Shyamali Pradhan (born 2 August 1972) is an Indian politician and former member of the West Bengal Legislative Assembly. She was elected as the representative the Nanoor constituency in the 2016 West Bengal Legislative Assembly election as a member of the Communist Party of India (Marxist). Pradhan is a member of the party state committee from the Birbhum district in West Bengal.

== Personal life ==
Shyamali Pradhan is a resident of Nanoor town in the district of Birbhum, West Bengal belonging to a Scheduled Caste family. She graduated from the Chandidas Mahavidyalaya affiliated to the University of Burdwan.

== Political career ==
In the 2011 West Bengal Legislative Assembly election, Shyamali Pradhan was nominated to contest from the Nanoor constituency in West Bengal as the candidate of the Communist Party of India (Marxist), one of the constituent parties of the Left Front coalition. She lost the election to the opposition candidate Gadadhar Hazra of the Trinamool Congress while polling at 46.07% of the votes cast against 49.21% in favor of Hazra.

In the 2016 West Bengal Legislative Assembly election, she was re-nominated as the candidate of the party from the constituency. The anti-communist Trinamool Congress in the prior four years had reportedly engaged in political repression through intimidation and violence against volunteers of the Communist Party of India (Marxist) and later became the subject of factional infighting with the emergence of two local factions in the Nanoor constituency, one of which openly backed Pradhan's candidacy during the campaigning period. She was subsequently elected as the representative from the constituency polling at 50.07% of the votes cast against 37.73% of the votes cast in favor of the incumbent Hazra. In light of the election results, a spate of political violence erupted between the two Trinamool Congress factions with Hazra's faction attacking the other. The leadership of the Trinamool Congress reacted to the incident by claiming that the infighting was orchestrated by the communists which was denied by Pradhan.

In 2019, she was inducted as the Birbhum representative in the West Bengal state committee of the Communist Party.
