= Sukumar De =

Indian politician

Member of the West Bengal Legislative Assembly
- In office 2011–2026
- Preceded by: Constituency established
- Succeeded by: Nirmal Khanra
- Constituency: Nandakumar

Personal details
- Born: 9 October 1960 (age 65) Nandakumar, West Bengal, India
- Party: Trinamool Congress
- Profession: Politician

Sukumar De (born 1960) is an Indian politician from West Bengal. He won as an three time MLA from Nandakumar Assembly constituency representing the Trinamool Congress.

== Early life and education ==
De is from Nandakumar, Purba Medinipur District, West Bengal. He is the son of Kshudiram De. He is a graduate in arts.

== Career ==
De first became an MLA winning the 2011 West Bengal Legislative Assembly election defeating Brahmamoy Nanda of the Samajwadi Party. He retained the seat in the 2016 West Bengal Legislative Assembly election representing Trinamool Congress. In 2016, he defeated his nearest rival Siraj Khan, who was an independent candidate supported by the LF - INC alliance. He won for the third consecutive time in the 2021 West Bengal Legislative Assembly election defeating Nilanjan Adhikary of the Bhratiya Janata Party by a margin of 5,406 votes.
