= Mortaza Hossain =

Indian politician and doctor

Mortoza Hossain

MLA of Deganga Vidhan Sabha Constituency
- In office 1982–1987
- Preceded by: A. K. M. Hasanuzzaman
- Succeeded by: A. K. M. Hasanuzzaman
- In office 2006–2011
- Preceded by: Md. Yakub
- Succeeded by: M. Nuruzzaman

Agriculture Marketing and Disaster Management Minister of West Bengal
- In office 2006–2011

Personal details
- Party: Indian National Congress

Mortoza Hossain is an Indian politician and doctor belonging to Indian National Congress. He was elected as MLA of Vidhan Sabha Constituency in 1982 and 2006. He was a minister of West Bengal Government.
