= Nandakumar Assembly constituency =

Nandakumar
- Constituency No. 207 for the West Bengal Legislative Assembly
- Interactive Map Outlining Nandakumar Assembly Constituency

Constituency details
- Country: India
- Region: East India
- State: West Bengal
- District: Purba Medinipur
- Lok Sabha constituency: Tamluk
- Established: 2011
- Total electors: 192,113
- Reservation: None

Member of Legislative Assembly
- 18th West Bengal Legislative Assembly
- Incumbent Nirmal Khanra
- Party: BJP
- Alliance: NDA
- Elected year: 2026

Nandakumar Assembly constituency is an assembly constituency in Purba Medinipur district in the Indian state of West Bengal.

== Overview ==
As per orders of the Delimitation Commission, No. 207 Nandakumar Assembly constituency is composed of the following: Nandakumar community development block and Bishnubarh I, Padumpur I and Padumpur II gram panchayats of Tamluk community development block.

Nandakumar Assembly constituency is part of No. 30 Tamluk (Lok Sabha constituency).

== Members of the Legislative Assembly ==
Year	Name	Party
2011	Sukumar De	Trinamool Congress
2016	Sukumar De	Trinamool Congress
2021	Sukumar De	Trinamool Congress
2026	Nirmal Khanra	Bharatiya Janata Party

== Election results ==
=== 2026 ===
2026 West Bengal Legislative Assembly election: Nandakumar
Party	Candidate	Votes	%	±%
BJP	Nirmal Khanra	131,476	52.73	+7.51
AITC	Sukumar De	100,873	40.46	−7.14
CPI(M)	Chandan Maiti	9,020	3.62	−2.0
Jatiya Unnayan Party	Abdul Kader Din	3,456	1.39	
NOTA	None of the above	1,198	0.48	−0.17
Majority		30,603	12.27	+9.89
Turnout		249,316	94.17	+4.63
BJP gain from AITC		Swing		

=== 2021 ===
In the 2021 West Bengal Legislative Assembly election Sukumar De of Trinamool Congress defeated his nearest rival Nilanjan Ashikary of Bharatiya Janta Party.

2016 West Bengal Legislative Assembly election: Nandakumar constituency
Party	Candidate	Votes	%	±%
AITC	Sukumar De	108,181	47.6	
BJP	Adhikary Nilanjan	102,775	45.22	
CPI(M)	Karuna Shankar Bhowmik	12,782	5.62	
NOTA	None of the above	1,473	0.65	
Majority		5,406	2.38	
Turnout		227,275	89.54	
AITC hold		Swing		

=== 2016 ===
In the 2016 West Bengal Legislative Assembly election Sukumar De of Trinamool Congress defeated his nearest rival Siraj Khan, who was an Independent candidate supported by the LF - INC Alliance.

2016 West Bengal Legislative Assembly election: Nandakumar constituency
Party	Candidate	Votes	%	±%
AITC	Sukumar De	98,549	48.11	−2.83
Independent	Siraj Khan	87,683	42.80	
BJP	Nilanjan Adhikary	10,668	5.21	+2.28
NOTA	None of the above	2,099	1.02	
Independent	Marphat Ali Khan	1,872	0.91	
SP	Prakash Chandra Bera	1,698	0.83	−43.37
WPI	Mirja Rabiul Islam	798	0.39	
LJP	Md. Sahalam Molla	793	0.39	
SUCI(C)	Saumitra Pattanayak	696	0.34	
Turnout		204,856	89.61	−2.07
AITC hold		Swing		

=== 2011 ===
West Bengal assembly elections, 2011: Nandakumar
Party	Candidate	Votes	%	±%
AITC	Sukumar De	89,717	50.94	+2.76#
SP	Brahmamoy Nanda	77,850	44.20	−5.96#
BJP	Nilanjan Adhikari	5,152	2.93	
Independent	Maphijul Islam Sekh	1,807		
People’s Democratic Conference of India	Abdur Razak Sk.	160		
Turnout		176,131	91.68	
AITC gain from SP		Swing	7.72#	

.# Swing calculated on Congress+Trinamool Congress vote percentages taken together and vote percentage of WBSP, in the now-defunct Narghat constituency in 2006.
