= Mala Saha =

Indian politician

Mala Saha (born 1956) is an Indian politician from West Bengal. She is a former two-time member of the West Bengal Legislative Assembly from Kashipur Belgachia Assembly constituency in Kolkata district. She won seat in 2011 and 2016 West Bengal Legislative Assembly election representing the All India Trinamool Congress.

== Early life and education ==
Saha is from Kashipur, Belgachia, Kolkata district, West Bengal. She married Tarun Saha. She completed her MA in history at Rabindra Bharati University in 1981. Later, she did B.Ed. at Calcutta University in 1983 and also obtained a Special Education (Mental Retardation) certificate from Rehabilitation Council of India. She is a retired school teacher.

== Career ==
Saha won from Kashipur Belgachia Assembly constituency representing the All India Trinamool Congress in the 2011 West Bengal Legislative Assembly election. She polled 87,408 votes and defeated her nearest rival, Kaninika Ghosh Bose of the Communist Party of India (Marxist), by a margin of 40,284 votes. She retained the seat for the Trinamool Congress in the 2016 West Bengal Legislative Assembly election defeating Kaninika Bose of the Communist Party of India (Marxist), by a margin of 25,810 votes. She was denied a ticket by Trinamool Congress for the 2021 Assembly election.
