= Tapan Hore =

Indian politician

Tapan Hore is an Indian politician belonging to Revolutionary Socialist Party. He is currently serving as the secretary of the West Bengal unit of the party. He also represented Bolpur Assembly constituency from 1991 to 2011.
