= Gadhadhar Hazra =

Gadadhar Hazra

Member of the West Bengal Legislative Assembly
- In office 2011–2016
- Preceded by: Jaydeb Hazra
- Succeeded by: Shyamali Pradhan
- Constituency: Nanoor

Personal details
- Party: All India Trinamool Congress

Gadadhar Hazra is an Indian politician affiliated with the Bharatiya Janata Party. He served as the Member of the Legislative Assembly from the Nanoor constituency in West Bengal Legislative Assembly from 2011 to 2016.

== Political career ==
Gadadhar Hazra was elected as a member of the West Bengal Legislative Assembly in 2011. At that time, he was associated with the All India Trinamool Congress. In the 2016 election, he contested from his constituency but was defeated by CPI(M) candidate Shyamali Pradhan. However, in 2019, he changed his party affiliation and joined the Bharatiya Janata Party.
