= Dr. M. Nuruzzaman =

Indian politician

M. Nuruzzaman is an Indian doctor and politician who has been MLA of the Deganga constituency (120 AC) since 2011. He is the son of A.K.M. Hasanuzzaman, the founding father of the Muslim League and ex-minister of commerce and industries in the state of West Bengal. In 2001 he lost by a mere 64 votes against the then speaker Hashim Abdul Halim. From the Amdanga constituency. He has served as the chairman of the minorities cell of the TMC party from 2006 to 2010. He has also served as the general secretary of the TMC party from 2006 to 2011.

== Academics and career ==
Nuruzzaman was born 18 October 1961 in Mograhat (south 24 pgs), West Bengal. He began his career in a village madrasah school. He passed his high school from Taltala High school in 1976 securing a rank of 32 all over Bengal including highest marks in the Bengali language in which he scored 140 out of 200. He was awarded a national scholarship. Thereafter he went on to join Presidency College to study Chemistry (Hons) passing out in the year 1979. From the year 1980-85 he pursued MBBS from Nil Ratan Sircar Medical College from under Calcutta University. In 1988 he completed a DMRD (Radio Diagnosis) from Calcutta University. From 1990 to 1992 he pursued MD (community medicine) from Calcutta University. He served as Assistant Prof in Tripura Medical College (2007–2011). He currently serves as a medical consultant in an individual capacity.

Apart from being a doctor and a politician he likes to use his free time writing. He was the editor of Bengali weekly Al-Hilal from 1980 to 1995. He also served as editor of Bengali magazine Subarna Bangla Somoy till 2013.

He is also known for his various charity works and is the chairman of the AKM Hassanuzzaman foundation.

== Political career ==
Nuruzzaman's political career began early under the tutelage of his dynamic politician father AKM Hassanuzzaman. From a very early age he began accompanying his father for various political meets and caught the attention of senior politicians for being very rooted to the cause of Grameen (rural) Bengal even though he could have chosen to have a comfortable lifestyle. He served as the General Secretary of the Muslim League till the year 1999. In 1998 he joined the 'save Bengal front (Bangla Bachao Front)' launched by Mamata Banerjee. In 1999 he joined Mamata Banerjee's clarion call to unite all secular and democratic forces against the incumbent left rule of 34 years. He represented TMC as the Lok Sabha candidate from the Bashirhat constituency in that year. In 2001 he created history of sorts when he lost by only 64 votes to the then speaker Hashim Abdul Halim from the Amdanga assembly constituency. In 2011 he won the Deganga constituency for the TMC party in the general assembly elections and has been serving as an MLA ever since.
