= 17th West Bengal Assembly =

Indian state assembly, 2021–26

←	16th Assembly	18th Assembly	→

Overview
- Legislative body: West Bengal Legislative Assembly
- Term: 8 May 2021 – 7 May 2026
- Election: 2021 West Bengal Legislative Assembly election
- Government: Third Banerjee ministry
- Opposition: Bharatiya Janata Party
- Members: 294
- Speaker of the House: Biman Banerjee
- Deputy Speaker of the House: Ashish Banerjee
- Leader of the House: Mamata Banerjee
- Deputy Leader of the House: Sovandeb Chattopadhyay
- Leader of the Opposition: Suvendu Adhikari
- Deputy Leader of the Opposition: Mihir Goswami
- Party control: Trinamool Congress

The Seventeenth Legislative Assembly of West Bengal constituted after the 2021 West Bengal Legislative Assembly elections which were concluded on 29 April 2021 and the results announced on 2 May 2021. The tenure of West Bengal Legislative Assembly ended on 7 May 2026.

== Members of Legislative Assembly ==
District	No.	Constituency	Name	Party	Remarks
Cooch Behar	1	Mekliganj	Paresh Adhikary	Trinamool Congress	
Cooch Behar	2	Mathabhanga	Sushil Barman	Bharatiya Janata Party	
Cooch Behar	3	Cooch Behar Uttar	Sukumar Roy	Bharatiya Janata Party	
Cooch Behar	4	Cooch Behar Dakshin	Nikhil Ranjan Dey	Bharatiya Janata Party	
Cooch Behar	5	Sitalkuchi	Baren Chandra Barman	Bharatiya Janata Party	
Cooch Behar	6	Sitai	Jagadish Basunia	Trinamool Congress	Elected to Lok Sabha in June 2024
Cooch Behar	6	Sitai	Sangita Roy	Trinamool Congress	Won in November 2024 bypoll
Cooch Behar	7	Dinhata	Nisith Pramanik	Bharatiya Janata Party	Resigned in May 2021
Cooch Behar	7	Dinhata	Udayan Guha	Trinamool Congress	Won in October 2021 bypoll
Cooch Behar	8	Natabari	Mihir Goswami	Bharatiya Janata Party	Deputy Leader of Opposition
Cooch Behar	9	Tufanganj	Malati Rava Roy	Bharatiya Janata Party	
Alipurduar	10	Kumargram	Manoj Kumar Oraon	Bharatiya Janata Party	
Alipurduar	11	Kalchini	Bishal Lama	Bharatiya Janata Party	
Alipurduar	12	Alipurduars	Suman Kanjilal	Trinamool Congress	Defected from BJP to AITC
Alipurduar	13	Falakata	Dipak Barman	Bharatiya Janata Party	
Alipurduar	14	Madarihat	Manoj Tigga	Bharatiya Janata Party	Elected to Lok Sabha in June 2024
Alipurduar	14	Madarihat	Jay Prakash Toppo	Trinamool Congress	Won in November 2024 bypoll
Jalpaiguri	15	Dhupguri	Bishnu Pada Roy	Bharatiya Janata Party	Died on 25 July 2023
Jalpaiguri	15	Dhupguri	Nirmal Chandra Roy	Trinamool Congress	Won in 2023 bypoll
Jalpaiguri	16	Maynaguri	Kaushik Roy	Bharatiya Janata Party	
Jalpaiguri	17	Jalpaiguri	Pradip Kumar Barma	Trinamool Congress	
Jalpaiguri	18	Rajganj	Khageshwar Roy	Trinamool Congress	
Jalpaiguri	19	Dabgram-Phulbari	Shikha Chatterjee	Bharatiya Janata Party	
Jalpaiguri	20	Mal	Bulu Chik Baraik	Trinamool Congress	
Jalpaiguri	21	Nagrakata	Puna Bhengra	Bharatiya Janata Party	
Kalimpong	22	Kalimpong	Ruden Sada Lepcha	Bharatiya Gorkha Prajatantrik Morcha	Switched from GJM to BGPM
Darjeeling	23	Darjeeling	Neeraj Zimba	Bharatiya Janata Party	
Darjeeling	24	Kurseong	Bishnu Prasad Sharma	Trinamool Congress	Defected from BJP to AITC.
Darjeeling	25	Matigara-Naxalbari	Anandamay Barman	Bharatiya Janata Party	
Darjeeling	26	Siliguri	Shankar Ghosh	Bharatiya Janata Party	
Darjeeling	27	Phansidewa	Durga Murmu	Bharatiya Janata Party	
Uttar Dinajpur	28	Chopra	Hamidul Rahman	Trinamool Congress	
Uttar Dinajpur	29	Islampur	Abdul Karim Chowdhury	Trinamool Congress	
Uttar Dinajpur	30	Goalpokhar	Md. Ghulam Rabbani	Trinamool Congress	
Uttar Dinajpur	31	Chakulia	Minhajul Arfin Azad	Trinamool Congress	
Uttar Dinajpur	32	Karandighi	Goutam Paul	Trinamool Congress	
Uttar Dinajpur	33	Hemtabad	Satyajit Barman	Trinamool Congress	
Uttar Dinajpur	34	Kaliaganj	Soumen Roy	Bharatiya Janata Party	Defected from BJP to AITC; later returned
Uttar Dinajpur	35	Raiganj	Krishna Kalyani	Bharatiya Janata Party	Defected from BJP to AITC; later resigned
Uttar Dinajpur	35	Raiganj	Krishna Kalyani	Trinamool Congress	Won in July 2024 bypoll
Uttar Dinajpur	36	Itahar	Mosaraf Hussen	Trinamool Congress	
Dakshin Dinajpur	37	Kushmandi	Rekha Roy	Trinamool Congress	
Dakshin Dinajpur	38	Kumarganj	Toraf Hossain Mandal	Trinamool Congress	
Dakshin Dinajpur	39	Balurghat	Ashok Lahiri	Bharatiya Janata Party	
Dakshin Dinajpur	40	Tapan	Budhrai Tudu	Bharatiya Janata Party	
Dakshin Dinajpur	41	Gangarampur	Satyendra Nath Ray	Bharatiya Janata Party	
Dakshin Dinajpur	42	Harirampur	Biplab Mitra	Trinamool Congress	
Malda	43	Habibpur	Joyel Murmu	Bharatiya Janata Party	
Malda	44	Gazole	Chinmoy Deb Barman	Bharatiya Janata Party	
Malda	45	Chanchal	Nihar Ranjan Ghosh	Trinamool Congress	
Malda	46	Harishchandrapur	Tajmul Hossain	Trinamool Congress	
Malda	47	Malatipur	Abdur Rahim Boxi	Trinamool Congress	
Malda	48	Ratua	Samar Mukherjee	Trinamool Congress	
Malda	49	Manikchak	Sabitri Mitra	Trinamool Congress	
Malda	50	Maldaha	Gopal Chandra Saha	Bharatiya Janata Party	
Malda	51	English Bazar	Sreerupa Mitra Chaudhury	Bharatiya Janata Party	
Malda	52	Mothabari	Sabina Yeasmin	Trinamool Congress	
Malda	53	Sujapur	Muhammad Abdul Ghani	Trinamool Congress	
Malda	54	Baisnabnagar	Chandana Sarkar	Trinamool Congress	
Murshidabad	55	Farakka	Manirul Islam	Trinamool Congress	
Murshidabad	56	Samserganj	Amirul Islam	Trinamool Congress	
Murshidabad	57	Suti	Emani Biswas	Trinamool Congress	
Murshidabad	58	Jangipur	Jakir Hossain	Trinamool Congress	
Murshidabad	59	Raghunathganj	Akhruzzaman	Trinamool Congress	
Murshidabad	60	Sagardighi	Subrata Saha	Trinamool Congress	Died on 29 December 2022
Murshidabad	60	Sagardighi	Bayron Biswas	Trinamool Congress	Won in 2023 bypoll as INC candidate, later defected to AITC
Murshidabad	61	Lalgola	Ali Mohammad	Trinamool Congress	
Murshidabad	62	Bhagabangola	Reyat Hossain Sarkar	Trinamool Congress	Won in May 2024 bypoll
Murshidabad	63	Raninagar	Abdul Soumik Hossain	Trinamool Congress	
Murshidabad	64	Murshidabad	Gouri Sankar Ghosh	Bharatiya Janata Party	
Murshidabad	65	Nabagram	Kanai Chandra Mondal	Bharatiya Janata Party	Defected from AITC to BJP
Murshidabad	66	Khargram	Ashish Marjit	Trinamool Congress	
Murshidabad	67	Burwan	Jiban Krishna Saha	Trinamool Congress	
Murshidabad	68	Kandi	Apurba Sarkar	Trinamool Congress	
Murshidabad	69	Bharatpur	Humayun Kabir	Aam Janata Unnayan Party	Suspended from AITC, formed JUP
Murshidabad	70	Rejinagar	Rabiul Alam Chowdhury	Trinamool Congress	
Murshidabad	71	Beldanga	Hasanuzzaman Sheikh	Trinamool Congress	
Murshidabad	72	Baharampur	Subrata Maitra	Bharatiya Janata Party	
Murshidabad	73	Hariharpara	Niamot Sheikh	Trinamool Congress	
Murshidabad	74	Naoda	Sahina Mumtaz Begum	Trinamool Congress	
Murshidabad	75	Domkal	Jafikul Islam	Trinamool Congress	Died on 4 September 2025
Murshidabad	75	Domkal	Vacant		
Murshidabad	76	Jalangi	Abdur Razzak	Independent politician	Resigned from AITC amid candidate change
Nadia	77	Karimpur	Bimalendu Sinha Roy	Trinamool Congress	
Nadia	78	Tehatta	Tapas Kumar Saha	Trinamool Congress	Died on 15 May 2025
Nadia	78	Tehatta	Vacant		
Nadia	79	Palashipara	Manik Bhattacharya	Trinamool Congress	
Nadia	80	Kaliganj	Nasiruddin Ahamed	Trinamool Congress	Died on 1 February 2025
Nadia	80	Kaliganj	Alifa Ahmed	Trinamool Congress	Elected in June 2025 bypoll
Nadia	81	Nakashipara	Kallol Khan	Trinamool Congress	
Nadia	82	Chapra	Rukbanur Rahman	Trinamool Congress	
Nadia	83	Krishnanagar Uttar	Mukul Roy	Trinamool Congress	Defected from BJP to AITC; Died on 23 February 2026
Nadia	83	Krishnanagar Uttar	Vacant		
Nadia	84	Nabadwip	Pundarikakhsa Saha	Trinamool Congress	
Nadia	85	Krishnanagar Dakshin	Ujjal Biswas	Trinamool Congress	
Nadia	86	Santipur	Jagannath Sarkar	Bharatiya Janata Party	Resigned in May 2021
Nadia	86	Santipur	Braja Kishore Goswami	Trinamool Congress	Won in October 2021 bypoll
Nadia	87	Ranaghat Uttar Paschim	Parthasarathi Chatterjee	Bharatiya Janata Party	
Nadia	88	Krishnaganj	Ashis Kumar Biswas	Bharatiya Janata Party	
Nadia	89	Ranaghat Uttar Purba	Ashim Biswas	Bharatiya Janata Party	
Nadia	90	Ranaghat Dakshin	Mukut Mani Adhikari	Bharatiya Janata Party	Defected from BJP to AITC; later resigned
Nadia	90	Ranaghat Dakshin	Mukut Mani Adhikari	Trinamool Congress	Won in July 2024 bypoll
Nadia	91	Chakdaha	Bankim Chandra Ghosh	Bharatiya Janata Party	
Nadia	92	Kalyani	Ambika Roy	Bharatiya Janata Party	
Nadia	93	Haringhata	Ashim Kumar Sarkar	Bharatiya Janata Party	
North 24 Parganas	94	Bagdah	Biswajit Das	Bharatiya Janata Party	Defected from BJP to AITC; later resigned
North 24 Parganas	94	Bagdah	Madhuparna Thakur	Trinamool Congress	Won in July 2024 bypoll
North 24 Parganas	95	Bangaon Uttar	Ashok Kirtania	Bharatiya Janata Party	
North 24 Parganas	96	Bangaon Dakshin	Swapan Majumder	Bharatiya Janata Party	
North 24 Parganas	97	Gaighata	Subrata Thakur	Bharatiya Janata Party	
North 24 Parganas	98	Swarupnagar	Bina Mondal	Trinamool Congress	
North 24 Parganas	99	Baduria	Abdur Rahim Quazi	Indian National Congress	Defected from AITC to INC
North 24 Parganas	100	Habra	Jyotipriya Mallick	Trinamool Congress	
North 24 Parganas	101	Ashokenagar	Narayan Goswami	Trinamool Congress	
North 24 Parganas	102	Amdanga	Rafiqur Rahaman	Trinamool Congress	
North 24 Parganas	103	Bijpur	Subodh Adhikary	Trinamool Congress	
North 24 Parganas	104	Naihati	Partha Bhowmick	Trinamool Congress	Elected to Lok Sabha in June 2024
North 24 Parganas	104	Naihati	Sanat Dey	Trinamool Congress	Won in November 2024 bypoll
North 24 Parganas	105	Bhatpara	Pawan Singh	Bharatiya Janata Party	
North 24 Parganas	106	Jagatdal	Somenath Shyam Ichini	Trinamool Congress	
North 24 Parganas	107	Noapara	Manju Basu	Trinamool Congress	
North 24 Parganas	108	Barrackpore	Raj Chakraborty	Trinamool Congress	
North 24 Parganas	109	Khardaha	Kajal Sinha	Trinamool Congress	Died on 25 April 2021
North 24 Parganas	109	Khardaha	Sovandeb Chattopadhyay	Trinamool Congress	Cabinet Minister; won in October 2021 bypoll
North 24 Parganas	110	Dum Dum Uttar	Chandrima Bhattacharya	Trinamool Congress	
North 24 Parganas	111	Panihati	Nirmal Ghosh	Trinamool Congress	
North 24 Parganas	112	Kamarhati	Madan Mitra	Trinamool Congress	
North 24 Parganas	113	Baranagar	Tapas Roy	Trinamool Congress	Resigned on 4 March 2024
North 24 Parganas	113	Baranagar	Sayantika Banerjee	Trinamool Congress	Won in June 2024 bypoll
North 24 Parganas	114	Dum Dum	Bratya Basu	Trinamool Congress	Cabinet Minister
North 24 Parganas	115	Rajarhat New Town	Tapash Chatterjee	Trinamool Congress	
North 24 Parganas	116	Bidhannagar	Sujit Bose	Trinamool Congress	
North 24 Parganas	117	Rajarhat Gopalpur	Aditi Munshi	Trinamool Congress	
North 24 Parganas	118	Madhyamgram	Rathin Ghosh	Trinamool Congress	Cabinet Minister
North 24 Parganas	119	Barasat	Chiranjeet Chakraborty	Trinamool Congress	
North 24 Parganas	120	Deganga	Rahima Mondal	Trinamool Congress	
North 24 Parganas	121	Haroa	Haji Nurul Islam	Trinamool Congress	Elected to Lok Sabha in June 2024
North 24 Parganas	121	Haroa	Sheikh Rabiul Islam	Trinamool Congress	Won in November 2024 bypoll
North 24 Parganas	122	Minakhan	Usha Rani Mondal	Trinamool Congress	
North 24 Parganas	123	Sandeshkhali	Sukumar Mahata	Trinamool Congress	
North 24 Parganas	124	Basirhat Dakshin	Saptarshi Banerjee	Trinamool Congress	
North 24 Parganas	125	Basirhat Uttar	Rafikul Islam Mondal	Trinamool Congress	
North 24 Parganas	126	Hingalganj	Debesh Mondal	Trinamool Congress	
South 24 Parganas	127	Gosaba	Jayanta Naskar	Trinamool Congress	Died on 19 June 2021
South 24 Parganas	127	Gosaba	Subrata Mondal	Trinamool Congress	Won in October 2021 bypoll
South 24 Parganas	128	Basanti	Shyamal Mondal	Trinamool Congress	
South 24 Parganas	129	Kultali	Ganesh Chandra Mondal	Trinamool Congress	
South 24 Parganas	130	Patharpratima	Samir Kumar Jana	Trinamool Congress	
South 24 Parganas	131	Kakdwip	Manturam Pakhira	Trinamool Congress	
South 24 Parganas	132	Sagar	Bankim Chandra Hazra	Trinamool Congress	
South 24 Parganas	133	Kulpi	Jogaranjan Halder	Trinamool Congress	
South 24 Parganas	134	Raidighi	Aloke Jaldata	Trinamool Congress	
South 24 Parganas	135	Mandirbazar	Joydeb Halder	Trinamool Congress	
South 24 Parganas	136	Jaynagar	Biswanath Das	Trinamool Congress	
South 24 Parganas	137	Baruipur Purba	Bivas Sardar	Trinamool Congress	
South 24 Parganas	138	Canning Paschim	Paresh Ram Das	Trinamool Congress	
South 24 Parganas	139	Canning Purba	Saokat Molla	Trinamool Congress	
South 24 Parganas	140	Baruipur Paschim	Biman Banerjee	Trinamool Congress	Speaker
South 24 Parganas	141	Magrahat Purba	Namita Saha	Trinamool Congress	
South 24 Parganas	142	Magrahat Paschim	Giasuddin Molla	Trinamool Congress	
South 24 Parganas	143	Diamond Harbour	Pannalal Halder	Trinamool Congress	
South 24 Parganas	144	Falta	Sankar Kumar Naskar	Trinamool Congress	
South 24 Parganas	145	Satgachia	Mohan Chandra Naskar	Trinamool Congress	
South 24 Parganas	146	Bishnupur	Dilip Mondal	Trinamool Congress	
South 24 Parganas	147	Sonarpur Dakshin	Arundhuti Maitra	Trinamool Congress	
South 24 Parganas	148	Bhangar	Nawsad Siddique	Indian Secular Front	
South 24 Parganas	149	Kasba	Javed Ahmed Khan	Trinamool Congress	
South 24 Parganas	150	Jadavpur	Debabrata Majumdar	Trinamool Congress	
South 24 Parganas	151	Sonarpur Uttar	Firdousi Begum	Trinamool Congress	
South 24 Parganas	152	Tollygunge	Aroop Biswas	Trinamool Congress	Cabinet Minister
South 24 Parganas	153	Behala Purba	Ratna Chatterjee	Trinamool Congress	
South 24 Parganas	154	Behala Paschim	Partha Chatterjee	Independent	Suspended from AITC
South 24 Parganas	155	Maheshtala	Dulal Chandra Das	Trinamool Congress	
South 24 Parganas	156	Budge Budge	Ashok Kumar Deb	Trinamool Congress	
South 24 Parganas	157	Metiaburuz	Abdul Khaleque Molla	Trinamool Congress	
Kolkata	158	Kolkata Port	Firhad Hakim	Trinamool Congress	Cabinet Minister & Mayor of Kolkata
Kolkata	159	Bhabanipur	Sovandeb Chattopadhyay	Trinamool Congress	Resigned on 21 May 2021
Kolkata	159	Bhabanipur	Mamata Banerjee	Trinamool Congress	Chief Minister; won in September 2021 bypoll
Kolkata	160	Rashbehari	Debasish Kumar	Trinamool Congress	
Kolkata	161	Ballygunge	Subrata Mukherjee	Trinamool Congress	Died in 2021
Kolkata	161	Ballygunge	Babul Supriyo	Trinamool Congress	Won in April 2022 bypoll
Kolkata	162	Chowrangee	Nayna Bandyopadhyay	Trinamool Congress	
Kolkata	163	Entally	Swarna Kamal Saha	Trinamool Congress	
Kolkata	164	Beleghata	Paresh Paul	Trinamool Congress	
Kolkata	165	Jorasanko	Vivek Gupta	Trinamool Congress	
Kolkata	166	Shyampukur	Shashi Panja	Trinamool Congress	
Kolkata	167	Maniktala	Sadhan Pande	Trinamool Congress	Died on 20 February 2022
Kolkata	167	Maniktala	Supti Pandey	Trinamool Congress	Won in July 2024 bypoll
Kolkata	168	Kashipur-Belgachhia	Atin Ghosh	Trinamool Congress	
Howrah	169	Bally	Rana Chatterjee	Trinamool Congress	
Howrah	170	Howrah Uttar	Gautam Chowdhuri	Trinamool Congress	
Howrah	171	Howrah Madhya	Arup Roy	Trinamool Congress	Cabinet Minister
Howrah	172	Shibpur	Manoj Tiwary	Trinamool Congress	Cabinet Minister
Howrah	173	Howrah Dakshin	Nandita Chowdhury	Trinamool Congress	
Howrah	174	Sankrail	Priya Paul	Trinamool Congress	
Howrah	175	Panchla	Gulshan Mullick	Trinamool Congress	
Howrah	176	Uluberia Purba	Bidesh Ranjan Bose	Trinamool Congress	
Howrah	177	Uluberia Uttar	Nirmal Maji	Trinamool Congress	
Howrah	178	Uluberia Dakshin	Pulak Roy	Trinamool Congress	
Howrah	179	Shyampur	Kalipada Mondal	Trinamool Congress	
Howrah	180	Bagnan	Arunava Sen	Trinamool Congress	
Howrah	181	Amta	Sukanta Kumar Paul	Trinamool Congress	
Howrah	182	Udaynarayanpur	Samir Kumar Panja	Trinamool Congress	
Howrah	183	Jagatballavpur	Sitanath Ghosh	Trinamool Congress	
Howrah	184	Domjur	Kalyan Ghosh	Trinamool Congress	
Hooghly	185	Uttarpara	Kanchan Mullick	Trinamool Congress	
Hooghly	186	Sreerampur	Sudipto Roy	Trinamool Congress	
Hooghly	187	Champdani	Arindam Guin	Trinamool Congress	
Hooghly	188	Singur	Becharam Manna	Trinamool Congress	
Hooghly	189	Chandannagar	Indranil Sen	Trinamool Congress	
Hooghly	190	Chunchura	Asit Mazumdar	Trinamool Congress	
Hooghly	191	Balagarh	Manoranjan Byapari	Trinamool Congress	
Hooghly	192	Pandua	Ratna De Nag	Trinamool Congress	
Hooghly	193	Saptagram	Tapan Dasgupta	Trinamool Congress	
Hooghly	194	Chanditala	Swati Khandoker	Trinamool Congress	
Hooghly	195	Jangipara	Snehasis Chakraborty	Trinamool Congress	
Hooghly	196	Haripal	Karabi Manna	Trinamool Congress	
Hooghly	197	Dhanekhali	Ashima Patra	Trinamool Congress	
Hooghly	198	Tarakeswar	Ramendu Sinharay	Trinamool Congress	
Hooghly	199	Pursurah	Biman Ghosh	Bharatiya Janata Party	
Hooghly	200	Arambagh	Madhusudan Bag	Bharatiya Janata Party	
Hooghly	201	Goghat	Biswanath Karak	Bharatiya Janata Party	
Hooghly	202	Khanakul	Susanta Ghosh	Bharatiya Janata Party	
Purba Medinipur	203	Tamluk	Soumen Mahapatra	Trinamool Congress	
Purba Medinipur	204	Panskura Purba	Biplab Roy Chowdhury	Trinamool Congress	
Purba Medinipur	205	Panskura Paschim	Firoja Bibi	Trinamool Congress	
Purba Medinipur	206	Moyna	Ashoke Dinda	Bharatiya Janata Party	
Purba Medinipur	207	Nandakumar	Sukumar De	Trinamool Congress	
Purba Medinipur	208	Mahisadal	Tilak Kumar Chakraborty	Trinamool Congress	
Purba Medinipur	209	Haldia	Tapasi Mondal	Trinamool Congress	Defected from BJP to AITC
Purba Medinipur	210	Nandigram	Suvendu Adhikari	Bharatiya Janata Party	Leader of the Opposition
Purba Medinipur	211	Chandipur	Soham Chakraborty	Trinamool Congress	
Purba Medinipur	212	Patashpur	Uttam Barik	Trinamool Congress	
Purba Medinipur	213	Kanthi Uttar	Sumita Sinha	Bharatiya Janata Party	
Purba Medinipur	214	Bhagabanpur	Rabindranath Maity	Bharatiya Janata Party	
Purba Medinipur	215	Khejuri	Santanu Pramanik	Bharatiya Janata Party	
Purba Medinipur	216	Kanthi Dakshin	Arup Kumar Das	Bharatiya Janata Party	
Purba Medinipur	217	Ramnagar	Akhil Giri	Trinamool Congress	
Purba Medinipur	218	Egra	Tarun Kumar Maity	Trinamool Congress	
Paschim Medinipur	219	Dantan	Bikram Chandra Pradhan	Trinamool Congress	
Jhargram	220	Nayagram	Dulal Murmu	Trinamool Congress	
Jhargram	221	Gopiballavpur	Khagendra Nath Mahata	Trinamool Congress	
Jhargram	222	Jhargram	Birbaha Hansda	Trinamool Congress	
Paschim Medinipur	223	Keshiary	Paresh Murmu	Trinamool Congress	
Paschim Medinipur	224	Kharagpur Sadar	Hiran Chatterjee	Bharatiya Janata Party	
Paschim Medinipur	225	Narayangarh	Surja Kanta Atta	Trinamool Congress	
Paschim Medinipur	226	Sabang	Manas Bhunia	Trinamool Congress	
Paschim Medinipur	227	Pingla	Ajit Maity	Trinamool Congress	
Paschim Medinipur	228	Kharagpur	Dinen Roy	Trinamool Congress	
Paschim Medinipur	229	Debra	Humayun Kabir	Trinamool Congress	
Paschim Medinipur	230	Daspur	Mamata Bhunia	Trinamool Congress	
Paschim Medinipur	231	Ghatal	Sital Kapat	Bharatiya Janata Party	
Paschim Medinipur	232	Chandrakona	Arup Dhara	Trinamool Congress	
Paschim Medinipur	233	Garbeta	Uttara Singha	Trinamool Congress	
Paschim Medinipur	234	Salboni	Srikanta Mahata	Trinamool Congress	
Paschim Medinipur	235	Keshpur	Seuli Saha	Trinamool Congress	
Paschim Medinipur	236	Medinipur	June Malia	Trinamool Congress	Elected to Lok Sabha in June 2024
Paschim Medinipur	236	Medinipur	Sujoy Hazra	Trinamool Congress	Won in November 2024 bypoll
Jhargram	237	Binpur	Debnath Hansda	Trinamool Congress	
Purulia	238	Bandwan	Rajib Lochan Saren	Trinamool Congress	
Purulia	239	Balarampur	Baneswar Mahato	Bharatiya Janata Party	
Purulia	240	Baghmundi	Sushanta Mahato	Trinamool Congress	
Purulia	241	Joypur	Narahari Mahato	Bharatiya Janata Party	
Purulia	242	Purulia	Sudip Kumar Mukherjee	Bharatiya Janata Party	
Purulia	243	Manbazar	Sandhya Rani Tudu	Trinamool Congress	
Purulia	244	Kashipur	Kamalakanta Hansda	Bharatiya Janata Party	
Purulia	245	Para	Nadiar Chand Bouri	Bharatiya Janata Party	
Purulia	246	Raghunathpur	Vivekananda Bauri	Bharatiya Janata Party	
Bankura	247	Saltora	Chandana Bauri	Bharatiya Janata Party	
Bankura	248	Chhatna	Satyanarayan Mukhopadhyay	Bharatiya Janata Party	
Bankura	249	Ranibandh	Jyotsna Mandi	Trinamool Congress	
Bankura	250	Raipur	Mrityunjoy Murmu	Trinamool Congress	
Bankura	251	Taldangra	Arup Chakraborty	Trinamool Congress	Elected to Lok Sabha in June 2024
Bankura	251	Taldangra	Falguni Singhababu	Trinamool Congress	Won in November 2024 bypoll
Bankura	252	Bankura	Niladri Sekhar Dana	Bharatiya Janata Party	
Bankura	253	Barjora	Alok Mukherjee	Trinamool Congress	
Bankura	254	Onda	Amarnath Shakha	Bharatiya Janata Party	
Bankura	255	Bishnupur	Tanmay Ghosh	Trinamool Congress	Defected from BJP to AITC
Bankura	256	Katulpur	Harakali Protiher	Trinamool Congress	Defected from BJP to AITC
Bankura	257	Indas	Nirmal Kumar Dhara	Bharatiya Janata Party	
Bankura	258	Sonamukhi	Dibakar Gharami	Bharatiya Janata Party	
Purba Bardhaman	259	Khandaghosh	Nabin Chandra Bag	Trinamool Congress	
Purba Bardhaman	260	Bardhaman Dakshin	Khokan Das	Trinamool Congress	
Purba Bardhaman	261	Raina	Shampa Dhara	Trinamool Congress	
Purba Bardhaman	262	Jamalpur	Alok Kumar Majhi	Trinamool Congress	
Purba Bardhaman	263	Monteswar	Siddiqullah Chowdhury	Trinamool Congress	
Purba Bardhaman	264	Kalna	Deboprasad Bag	Trinamool Congress	
Purba Bardhaman	265	Memari	Madhusudan Bhattacharya	Trinamool Congress	
Purba Bardhaman	266	Bardhaman Uttar	Nisith Kumar Malik	Trinamool Congress	
Purba Bardhaman	267	Bhatar	Mangobinda Adhikari	Trinamool Congress	
Purba Bardhaman	268	Purbasthali Dakshin	Swapan Debnath	Trinamool Congress	
Purba Bardhaman	269	Purbasthali Uttar	Tapan Chatterjee	Trinamool Congress	
Purba Bardhaman	270	Katwa	Rabindranath Chatterjee	Trinamool Congress	
Purba Bardhaman	271	Ketugram	Sekh Sahonawez	Trinamool Congress	
Purba Bardhaman	272	Mangalkot	Apurba Chowdhury	Trinamool Congress	
Purba Bardhaman	273	Ausgram	Abhedananda Thander	Trinamool Congress	
Purba Bardhaman	274	Galsi	Nepal Ghorui	Trinamool Congress	
Paschim Bardhaman	275	Pandabeswar	Narendranath Chakraborty	Trinamool Congress	
Paschim Bardhaman	276	Durgapur Purba	Pradip Mazumdar	Trinamool Congress	
Paschim Bardhaman	277	Durgapur Paschim	Lakshman Chandra Ghorui	Bharatiya Janata Party	
Paschim Bardhaman	278	Raniganj	Tapas Banerjee	Trinamool Congress	
Paschim Bardhaman	279	Jamuria	Hareram Singh	Trinamool Congress	
Paschim Bardhaman	280	Asansol Dakshin	Agnimitra Paul	Bharatiya Janata Party	
Paschim Bardhaman	281	Asansol Uttar	Moloy Ghatak	Trinamool Congress	
Paschim Bardhaman	282	Kulti	Ajay Kumar Poddar	Bharatiya Janata Party	
Paschim Bardhaman	283	Barabani	Bidhan Upadhyay	Trinamool Congress	
Birbhum	284	Dubrajpur	Anup Kumar Saha	Bharatiya Janata Party	
Birbhum	285	Suri	Bikash Roychoudhury	Trinamool Congress	
Birbhum	286	Bolpur	Chandranath Singha	Trinamool Congress	
Birbhum	287	Nanoor	Bidhan Chandra Majhi	Trinamool Congress	
Birbhum	288	Labpur	Abhijit Sinha	Trinamool Congress	
Birbhum	289	Sainthia	Nilabati Saha	Trinamool Congress	
Birbhum	290	Mayureswar	Abhijit Roy	Trinamool Congress	
Birbhum	291	Rampurhat	Asish Banerjee	Trinamool Congress	Deputy Speaker
Birbhum	292	Hansan	Asok Kumar Chattopadhyay	Trinamool Congress	
Birbhum	293	Nalhati	Rajendra Prasad Singh	Trinamool Congress	
Birbhum	294	Murarai	Mosarraf Hossain	Trinamool Congress	

== See also ==
- West Bengal Legislative Assembly
- 2021 West Bengal Legislative Assembly Elections
- West Bengal
- Mamata Banerjee
