= Third Banerjee ministry =

2021–26 government of West Bengal, India

- 21st Ministry of West Bengal
- 2021—2026
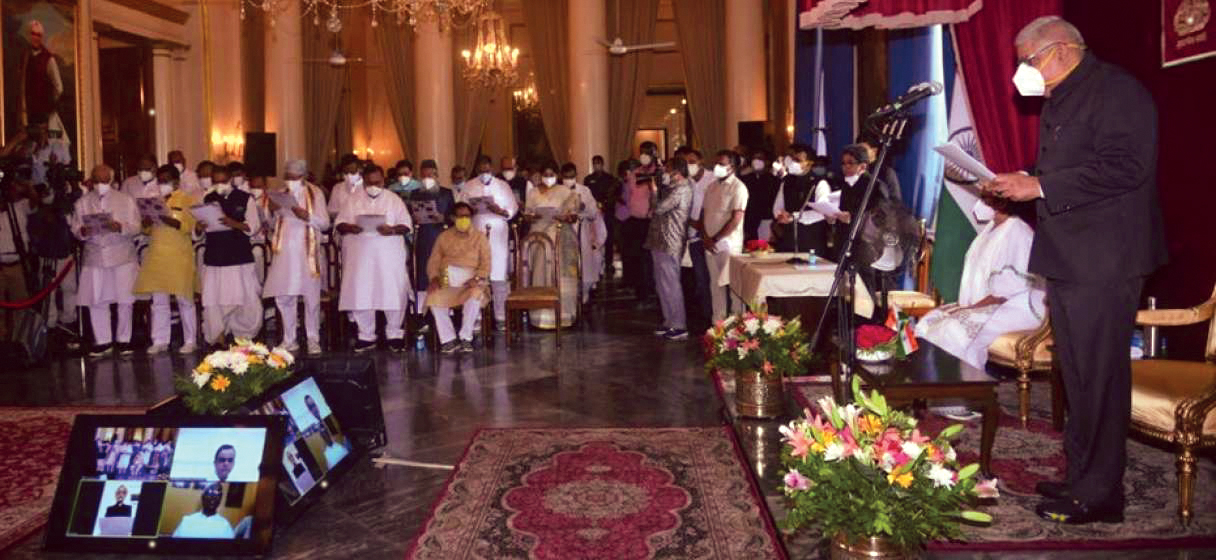
- Cabinet oath on 10 May 2021 at Raj Bhavan, Kolkata.
- Date established: 5 May 2021
- Date dissolved: 7 May 2026

Leadership and composition
- Governor: Jagdeep Dhankhar (until 2022); C. V. Ananda Bose (until 2026); R. N. Ravi (from 2026)
- Chief Minister: Mamata Banerjee
- Chief Minister's history: 2011 — 2026
- No. of ministers: 23 Cabinet Ministers; 8 Minister of state (I/C) (Note: I/C stands for independent charge. It means that a minister can hold portfolios independently in a junior rank.); 8 Minister of state
- Ministers removed: 3 death 9 resigned
- Total no. of members: 39 members
- Member party: All India Trinamool Congress
- Status in legislature: Majority
- Opposition party: Bharatiya Janata Party
- Opposition leader: Suvendu Adhikari

Formation and history
- Election: 2021
- Legislature term: 17th West Bengal Assembly (2021-2026)
- Predecessor: Second Banerjee ministry
- Successor: Suvendu Adhikari ministry

The 21st Council of Ministers for the state of West Bengal was formed under the leadership of Mamata Banerjee. She was sworn in as Chief Minister of West Bengal for the third time on 5 May 2021. The remaining council of ministers was sworn in on 10 May 2021.

Taking the Oath at Throne Room, Raj Bhavan, Kolkata
Mamata Banerjee takes the oath of office as Chief Minister administered by Governor Jagdeep Dhankhar on 5 May 2021.

== Constitutional requirement ==
=== For the Council of Ministers to aid and advise Governor ===
According to Article 163 of the Indian Constitution,

1. There shall be a Council of Ministers with the Chief Minister at the head to aid and advise the Governor in the exercise of his/her function, except in so far as he/she is by or under this Constitution required to exercise her/his functions or any of them in her/his discretion.
2. If any question arises whether any matter is or is not a matter as respects which the Governor is by or under this Constitution required to act in her/his discretion, the decision of the Governor in her/his discretion shall be final, and the validity of anything done by the Governor shall not be called in question on the ground that she/he ought or ought not to have acted in her/his discretion.
3. The question whether any, and if so what, advice was tendered by Ministers to the Governor shall not be inquired into in any court.

This means that the Ministers serve under the pleasure of the Governor and he/she may remove them, on the advice of the Chief Minister, whenever they want.

=== For other provisions as to Ministers ===
According to Article 164 of the Indian Constitution,

1. The Chief Minister shall be appointed by the Governor and the other Ministers shall be appointed by the Governor on the advice of the Chief Minister, and the Minister shall hold office during the pleasure of the Governor:
  Provided that in the States of Bihar, Madhya Pradesh and Orissa, there shall be a Minister in charge of tribal welfare who may in addition be in charge of the welfare of the Scheduled Castes and backward classes or any other work.
2. The Council of Minister shall be collectively responsible to the Legislative Assembly of the State.
3. Before a Minister enters upon his office, the Governor shall administer to him the oaths of office and of secrecy according to the forms set out for the purpose in the Third Schedule.
4. A Minister who for any period of six consecutive months is not a member of the Legislature of the State shall at the expiration of that period cease to be a Minister.
5. The salaries and allowances of Ministers shall be such as the Legislature of the State may from time to time by law determine and, until the Legislature of the State so determines, shall be a specified in the Second Schedule.

== Council of ministers ==
S.No	Portrait	Name	Constituency	Assumed office	Department	Party
1		Mamata Banerjee (Chief Minister)	Bhabanipur	5 May 2021	Home and Hill Affairs; Personnel & Administration; Planning; Revenue; Tourism; Information Technology & Electronics; Industrial Reconstruction; Statistics Program Implementation; Department of Youth Affairs and Sports; Health and Family Welfare; Land and Land Reforms; Refugee Rehabilitation; Information & Cultural Affairs; Law, Judicial	AITC
Cabinet Ministers
2		Sovandeb Chattopadhyay	Khardaha	10 May 2021	Parliamentary Affairs; Agriculture	AITC
3		Manas Bhunia	Sabang	10 May 2021	Water Resources Investigation Development; Irrigation Waterways	AITC
4		Snehasis Chakraborty	Jangipara	03 August 2022	Transport	AITC
5		Moloy Ghatak	Asansol Uttar	10 May 2021	Public Works	AITC
6		Aroop Biswas	Tollyganj	10 May 2021	Power; Housing	AITC
7		Ujjal Biswas	Krishnanagar Dakshin	10 May 2021	Science, Technology & Bio-technology	AITC
8		Arup Roy	Howrah Madhya	10 May 2021	Co-operatives	AITC
9		Rathin Ghosh	Madhyamgram	10 May 2021	Food Supplies Department	AITC
10		Firhad Hakim	Kolkata Port	10 May 2021	Urban Development & Municipal Affairs	AITC
11		Chandranath Sinha	Bolpur	10 May 2021	Micro, Small Medium Enterprises; Textiles; Correctional Administration	AITC
12		Bankim Chandra Hazra	Sagar	10 May 2021	Sundarban Affairs	AITC
13		Bratya Basu	Dum Dum	10 May 2021	School and Higher Education	AITC
14		Pulak Roy	Uluberia Dakshin	10 May 2021	Public Health Engineering	AITC
15		Shashi Panja	Shyampukur	10 May 2021	Women and Child Development Social Welfare; Department of Industries	AITC
16		Biplab Mitra	Harirampur	10 May 2021	Agricultural Marketing	AITC
17		Javed Ahmed Khan	Kasba	10 May 2021	Disaster Management Civil Defence	AITC
18		Swapan Debnath	Purbasthali Dakshin	10 May 2021	Animal Resources Development	AITC
19		Siddiqullah Chowdhury	Manteswar	10 May 2021	Mass Education Extension Library Services	AITC
20		Udayan Guha	Dinhata	03 August 2022	North Bengal Development	AITC
21		Pradip Mazumdar	Durgapur Purba	03 August 2022	Rural Development and Panchayati Raj	AITC
22		Md. Ghulam Rabbani	Goalpokhar	10 May 2021	Non-Conventional Renewable Energy Sources	AITC
Ministers of State (Independent Charge)
23		Becharam Manna	Singur	10 May 2021	Labour; MoS in Panchayet Rural Development	AITC
24		Chandrima Bhattacharya	Dum Dum Uttar	10 May 2021	MoS in Health Family Welfare; MoS in Land & Land Reforms; MoS in Refugee Rehabilitiation; MoS in Finance Excise (I/C); Environment	AITC
25		Sandhya Rani Tudu	Manbazar	10 May 2021	Paschimanchal Unnayan Affairs; MoS in Parliament Affairs	AITC
26		Bulu Chik Baraik	Mal	10 May 2021	Backward Classes Welfare; Tribal Development	AITC
27		Sujit Bose	Bidhannagar	10 May 2021	Fire and Emergency Services	AITC
28		Indranil Sen	Chandannagar	10 May 2021	Tourism; Technical Education, Training and Skill Development; MoS in Information and Cultural Affairs	AITC
29		Birbaha Hansda	Jhargram	10 May 2021	Forests; Self Help Group Self Employment	AITC
30		Biplab Roy Chowdhury	Panskura Purba	03 August 2022	Fisheries	AITC
Ministers Of State
31		Dilip Mondal	Bishnupur	10 May 2021	Transport	AITC
32		Akhruzzaman	Raghunathganj	10 May 2021	Power	AITC
33		Seuli Saha	Keshpur	10 May 2021	Panchayet Rural Development	AITC
34		Tajmul Hossain	Harishchandrapur	03 August 2022	Micro, Small Medium Enterprises and Textiles	AITC
35		Jyotsna Mandi	Ranibandh	10 May 2021	Food Supplies	AITC
36		Satyajit Barman	Hemtabad	03 August 2022	School Education	AITC
37		Sabina Yeasmin	Mothabari	10 May 2021	Irrigation Waterways; North Bengal Development	AITC
38		Manoj Tiwary	Shibpur	10 May 2021	Youth Affairs Sports	AITC
39		Srikanta Mahata	Salboni	10 May 2021	Consumer Affairs	AITC

== Demographics of Council of Ministers ==
Representation of Cabinet Ministers by district
1. Bankura (2.43%)
2. Birbhum (2.43%)
3. Cooch Behar (2.43%)
4. Dakshin Dinajpur (2.43%)
5. Hooghly (7.31%)
6. Howrah (7.31%)
7. Jalpaiguri (2.43%)
8. Jhargram (2.43%)
9. Kolkata (7.31%)
10. Malda (2.43%)
11. Murshidabad (4.87%)
12. Nadia (2.43%)
13. Uttar 24 Parganas (14.6%)
14. Paschim Bardhaman (2.43%)
15. Paschim Medinipur (9.75%)
16. Purba Bardhaman (4.87%)
17. Purba Medinipur (4.87%)
18. Purulia (2.43%)
19. Dakshin 24 Parganas (12.2%)
20. Uttar Dinajpur (2.43%)

District	Number of Ministers	Name of Ministers
Bankura	1	Jyotsna Mandi
Birbhum	1	Chandranath Sinha
Cooch Behar	1	Udayan Guha
Kolkata	4	Mamata Banerjee (Chief Minister); Firhad Hakim; Shashi Panja; Babul Supriyo
Paschim Bardhaman	2	Moloy Ghatak; Pradip Mazumdar
Purba Bardhaman	2	Swapan Debnath; Siddiqullah Chowdhury
Paschim Medinipur	2	Manas Ranjan Bhunia; Seuli Saha
Uttar 24 Parganas	5	Sovandeb Chattopadhyay; Rathin Ghosh; Bratya Basu; Chandrima Bhattacharya; Sujit Bose
Dakshin 24 Parganas	4	Aroop Biswas; Bankim Chandra Hazra; Javed Ahmed Khan; Dilip Mondal
Uttar Dinajpur	2	Md. Ghulam Rabbani; Satyajit Barman
Dakshin Dinajpur	1	Biplab Mitra
Hooghly	3	Snehasis Chakraborty; Becharam Manna; Indranil Sen
Howrah	3	Arup Roy; Pulak Roy; Manoj Tiwary
Jalpaiguri	1	Bulu Chik Baraik
Jhargram	1	Birbaha Hansda
Mursidabad	1	Akhruzzaman
Malda	2	Tajmul Hossain; Sabina Yeasmin
Nadia	1	Ujjal Biswas
Purulia	1	Sandhya Rani Tudu
Alipurduar	—	—
Darjeeling	—	—
Kalimpong	—	—
Purba Medinipur	—	—
Total	38	

== Former Ministers ==
S.No	Name	Portrait	Constituency	Assumed office	Left office	Department served	Party
1	Subrata Mukherjee		Ballygunge	10 May 2021	4 November 2021	Panchayet and Rural Development; Public Enterprises; Industrial Reconstruction	AITC
2	Amit Mitra		No constituency	10 May 2021	9 November 2021	Finance; Planning Statistics; Programme Monitoring	AITC
3	Sadhan Pande		Maniktala	10 May 2021	9 November 2021	Consumer Affairs; Self Help Group and Self Employment	AITC
4	Partha Chatterjee		Behala Paschim	10 May 2021	28 July 2022	Industry, Commerce Enterprise; Information Technology Electronics; Parliamentary Affairs; Public Enterprise; Industrial Reconstruction0	AITC
5	Ratna De (Nag)		Pandua	10 May 2021	3 August 2022	Environment; Science Technology and Bio-Technology	AITC
6	Humayun Kabir		Debra	10 May 2021	3 August 2022	Technical Education, Training Skill Development	AITC
7	Paresh Chandra Adhikary		Mekliganj	10 May 2021	3 August 2022	School Higher Education	AITC
8	Soumen Kumar Mahapatra		Tamluk	10 May 2021	3 August 2022	Irrigation and Waterways	AITC
9	Subrata Saha		Sagardighi	10 May 2021	29 December 2022	Food Processing Industries Horticulture	AITC
10	Akhil Giri		Ramnagar	10 May 2021	4 August 2024	Fisheries	AITC
11	Jyotipriya Mallick		Habra	10 May 2021	17 February 2024	Forest	AITC
12	Partha Bhowmick		Naihati	03 August 2022	08 August 2024	Public Enterprises & Industrial Reconstruction; Irrigation and waterways	AITC
13	Babul Supriyo		Ballygunge	03 August 2022	. March 2026		AITC
