= Babul Supriyo =

Indian singer and politician (born 1970)

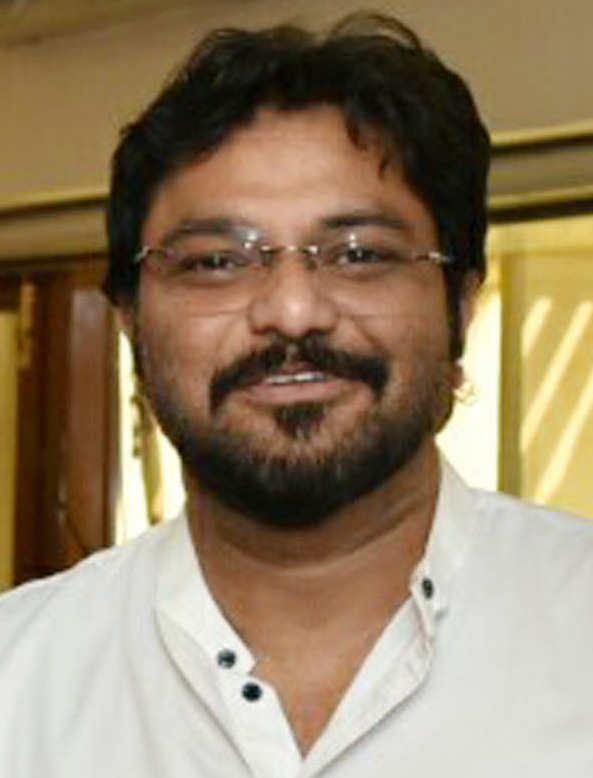
- Supriyo in 2018

Member of Parliament, Rajya Sabha
- Incumbent
- Assumed office 3 April 2026
- Preceded by: Subrata Bakshi
- Constituency: West Bengal

Minister of Public Enterprises and Industrial Reconstruction of West Bengal
- In office 7 August 2024 – 3 April 2026
- Chief Minister: Mamata Banerjee
- Preceded by: Partha Bhowmick

Minister of Information Technology and Electronics of West Bengal
- In office 3 August 2022 – 3 April 2026
- Chief Minister: Mamata Banerjee
- Preceded by: Partha Chatterjee
- Succeeded by: Kalyan Chakraborti

Minister of Tourism of West Bengal
- In office 3 August 2022 – 11 September 2023
- Chief Minister: Mamata Banerjee
- Preceded by: Indranil Sen
- Succeeded by: Indranil Sen
Ministerial portfolios in Union Government
Minister of State for Environment, Forest and Climate Change
In office 31 May 2019 ‍–‍ 7 July 2021
Prime Minister	Narendra Modi
Preceded by	Mahesh Sharma
Succeeded by	Ashwini Kumar Choubey
Minister of State for Heavy Industries and Public Enterprises
In office 12 July 2016 ‍–‍ 30 May 2019
Prime Minister	Narendra Modi
Preceded by	G. M. Siddeshwara
Succeeded by	Arjun Ram Meghwal
Minister of State for Housing and Urban Development
In office 9 November 2014 ‍–‍ 12 July 2016
Prime Minister	Narendra Modi
Preceded by	Deepa Dasmunsi
Succeeded by	Rao Inderjit Singh

Member of West Bengal Legislative Assembly
- In office 16 April 2022 – 3 April 2026
- Preceded by: Subrata Mukherjee
- Succeeded by: Sovandeb Chattopadhyay
- Constituency: Ballygunge

Member of Parliament, Lok Sabha
- In office 16 May 2014 ‍–‍ 31 July 2021
- Preceded by: Bansa Gopal Chowdhury
- Succeeded by: Shatrughan Sinha
- Constituency: Asansol, West Bengal

Personal details
- Born: Babul Supriya Baral; 15 December 1970 (age 55) Uttarpara, West Bengal, India
- Party: All India Trinamool Congress (since 2021) (until 2026); Mamata All India Trinamool Congress (from 2026)
- Other political affiliations: Bharatiya Janata Party (2014–2021)
- Occupation: Politician; actor; playback singer

Babul Supriya Baral (born 15 December 1970) is an Indian playback singer, live performer, television host, actor and politician who currently serves as Member of Parliament, Rajya Sabha from West Bengal. He previously served as Cabinet Minister of Information Technology and Electronics of the Government of West Bengal from 2024 till 2026. He was elected Member of Parliament from Asansol in the 16th and 17th Lok Sabha and also served as the Minister of State for Environment, Forest and Climate Change, in the Union Council of Ministers. He officially resigned as MP on 19 October 2021 and was elected as a Member of the West Bengal Legislative Assembly on 16 April 2022 from Ballygunge Assembly seat.

He started his career as playback singer in Hindi cinema in the mid-nineties and has sung for many films since then. He primarily sings in Hindi, Bengali, and Odia languages. However, he has also done playback singing in 11 other languages during his musical career. He entered politics in 2014 and joined Narendra Modi's government. He previously served as Union Minister of State for Ministry of Urban Development, Ministry of Housing and Urban Poverty Alleviation and Ministry of Heavy Industries and Public Enterprises.

Supriyo quit the Bharatiya Janata Party and joined the Trinamool Congress Party in September 2021.

== Early life ==
Supriyo was born and brought up in Uttarpara, a suburb town of Kolkata on the banks of the Hooghly River in West Bengal. His parents are Sunil Chandra Baral and Sumitra Baral. Babul comes from a musically inclined family and was greatly influenced by his grandfather, Banikantha NC Baral, a Bengali vocalist and composer. He won several inter-school and inter-college music compositions, and had performed in All India Radio and Doordarshan. He attended Don Bosco School during which he became an "All India Don Bosco Music Champion" in 1983, and "The Most Enriching Talent" in 1985. He completed his bachelor's degree in commerce from Serampore College in 1991.

When he entered the entertainment industry, he changed his birth name Supriya Baral to Babul Supriyo.

== Personal life ==
Supriyo was introduced to Riaa at a Shah Rukh Khan concert in Toronto. They got married in 1995. They have one child. Supriyo and Riaa divorced in October 2015. He remarried on 9 August 2016 to Rachna Sharma, an air hostess of Jet Airways.

== Political career ==
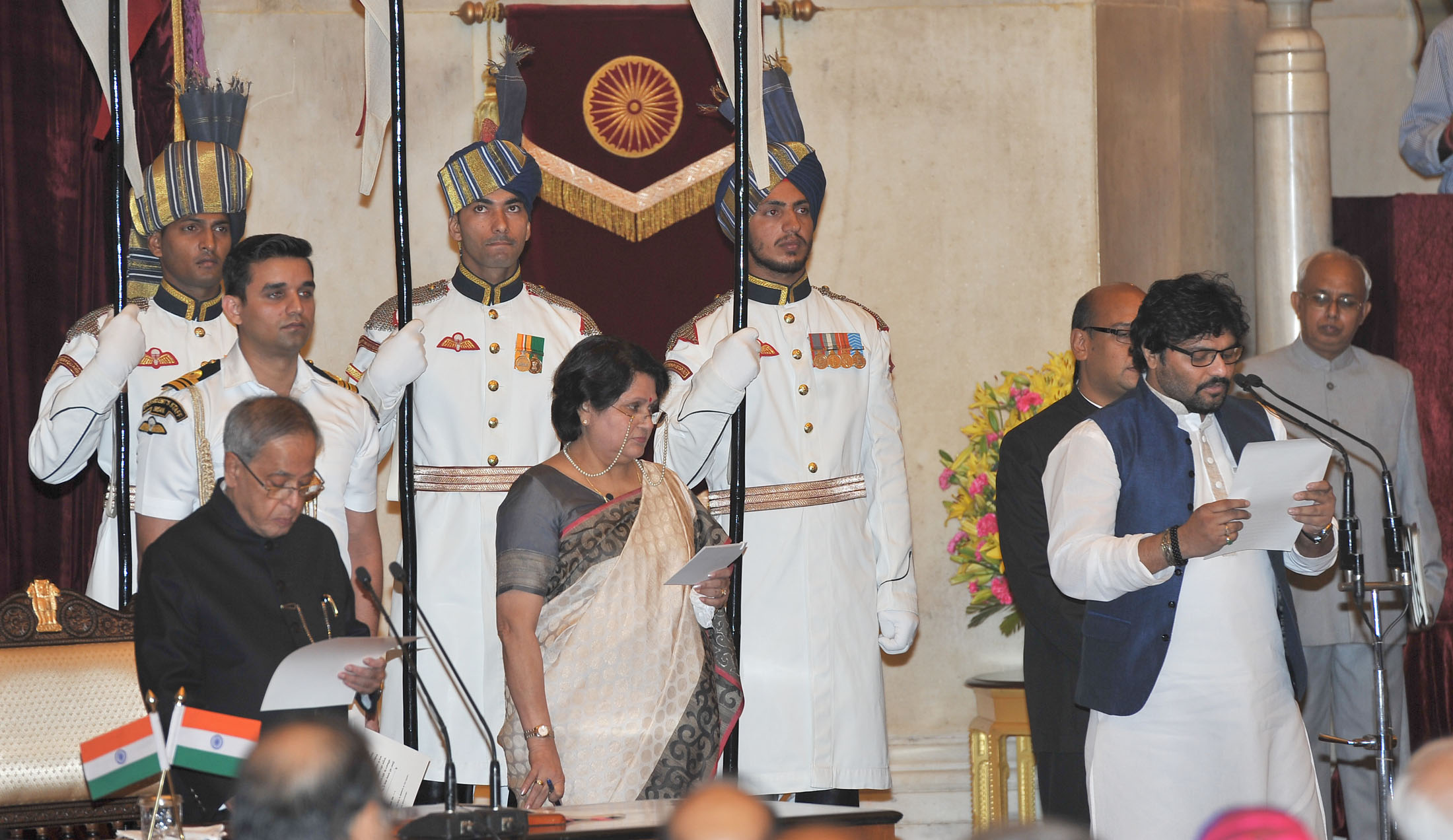
The President, Shri Pranab Mukherjee administering the oath as Minister of State to Shri Babul Supriya (Babul Supriyo) Baral, at a Swearing-in Ceremony, at Rashtrapati Bhavan, in New Delhi on 9 November 2014.

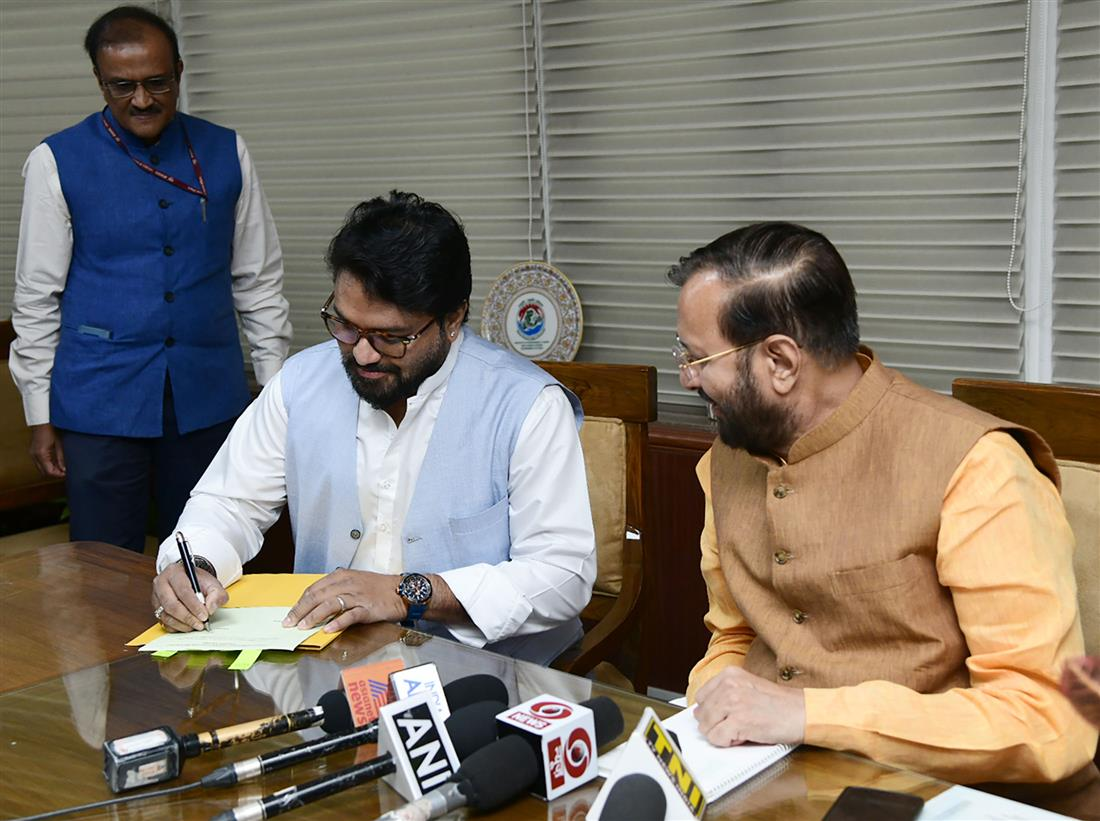
Babul Supriyo taking charge as the Minister of State for Environment, Forest and Climate Change, on 1 June 2019

An ardent admirer of Atal Bihari Vajpayee and Narendra Modi, Supriyo was introduced to Bharatiya Janata Party in March 2014. In 2014 Indian general election, he was nominated by the party as their candidate for Asansol, West Bengal and won it by defeating Dola Sen. He was inducted to Narendra Modi's government as the Union Minister of State, Ministry of Urban Development; and Ministry of Housing and Urban Poverty Alleviation on 9 November 2014. He became the youngest minister. He served in these ministries till 12 July 2016, after which his portfolio was changed to Minister of State for Heavy Industries and Public Enterprises.

In the 2019 Indian general election, Supriyo again won from the Asansol as a Bharatiya Janata Party candidate defeating Moon Moon Sen by 1.97 lakh votes, and securing a total of 6.32 lakh votes. In May 2019, he became Minister of State for Environment, Forest and Climate Change.

Member of Parliament

Election	Constituency	Party	Votes	%	±
2019	Asansol	Bharatiya Janata Party	6,33,378	51.16	▲14.41
2014	Asansol	Bharatiya Janata Party	4,19,983	36.75	▲31.19

On 19 September 2019, Supriyo was attacked by students after he was invited to attend an event at Calcutta's Jadavpur University.

On 13 August 2019, Supriyo Babul, accused the state government of not giving food for the cyclone affected people in Fazarganj for 5 days.

In the 2021 West Bengal Legislative Assembly election, Babul Supriyo ran from Tollyganj (Vidhan Sabha constituency) as the Bharatiya Janata Party candidate and lost by more than 50,000 votes. Probably stung by an unexpected defeat, Supriyo stated that Bengal had made a 'historic mistake' by voting for TMC. However the Facebook post was later deleted.

On 31 July 2021, Babul Supriyo announced on social media his decision to quit politics and also resign as a Lok Sabha MP. However, days later he decided to complete his tenure as MP. He then edited his Facebook post deleting the "won't join any party" remark raising speculations. On 18 September 2021 he joined TMC in presence of Abhishek Banerjee.

On 16 April 2022 he was elected as a Member of the West Bengal Legislative Assembly from Ballygunge Assembly seat.

On 27 February 2026, Supriyo was announced as the Trinamool Congress party candidate from West Bengal for the 2026 Rajya Sabha elections to be held on 16 March. After he was elected as an MP, he resigned as a cabinet minister and as a member of legislative assembly.

== Singing career ==
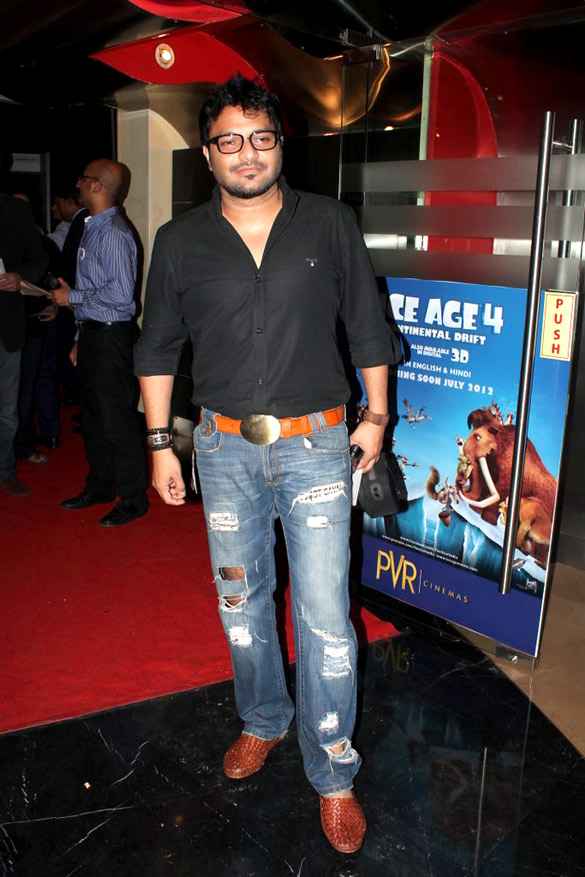
Babul Supriyo at Premiere of 'Rock Of Ages'

After a brief work at the Standard Chartered Bank, Supriyo chose singing as a full-time career. He moved to Mumbai in 1992 to make a career in Hindi cinema. Kalyanji gave him a break, and took him to perform abroad at their live shows. In 1993 he toured Canada and USA with Amitabh Bachchan. He also toured US with Asha Bhonsle in 1997 and 1999. Besides playback singing, he has also done several stage shows. Babul Supriyo performed at Powai Sarvajanin Durgotsav in 2011.

His breakthrough came with "Dil Ne Dil Ko Pukara" in Kaho Naa... Pyaar Hai in 2000, the debut film of Hrithik Roshan. Some of his other popular Hindi cinema songs are "Pari Pari Hai Ek Pari" (Hungama), "Hum Tum" (Hum Tum) and "Chanda Chamke" (Fanaa). He is the anchor of the hit television show K for Kishore. He sang the opening themes of Balaji Telefilms serials.

== Discography ==
=== Albums ===
- Monoroma Tilottama (1997)
- Hoyto Tomari Jannya (1999)
- Sochta Hun (2003)
- Mon Uri Jai (2003)
- Kuch Aisa Lagta Hai
- Untitled - Babul Supriyo (2008)
- Kotobaaro Bhebechhinu (Rabindra Sangeet) (2009) - Asha Audio
- Jodi Jantem (Rabindra Sangeet) (2010) - Asha Audio
- Babul Baul (2014)
- Mone Robe (2011, Rabindra Sangeet album comprising 10 songs sung by Babul Supriyo & Alka Yagnik)
- Just Tomake
- What The Folk
- Timeless
- Suna Pharua (2016, Odia)

=== As a playback singer ===
==== Bengali films ====
Key
†	Denotes films that have not yet been released

Year	Film/Album	Song name	Composer	Notes
1994	Ekka Raja Rani	Dil Ko Zara Sa	Nadeem–Shravan	
1994	Prem Yog	Zindagi Char Din Ki	Bappi Lahiri	
1994	Kranti Kshetra	Malan Thara Baag Mein; Shor Machaongi	Nadeem–Shravan	
1995	Gaddaar	Baraste Paani Ka Maza	Nadeem–Shravan	Uncredited
1995	Oorja: The High Energy Versions	Q-Funk	Phil & Jerry	Debut remix song
1996	Agni Sakshi	O Piya O Piya	Nadeem–Shravan	
1996	Shastra	Kuch Hua Re Hua Re	Aadesh Shrivastava	
1996	Jung	Kya Dekh Raha Hai	Nadeem–Shravan	
1996	Khiladiyon Ka Khiladi	Aaj Meri Zindagi	Anu Malik	
1996	Himmatvar	Kitni Chahat Chhupaye Baitha Hoon	Nadeem–Shravan	
1997	Saat Rang Ke Sapne	Aati Hai To Chal; Dilon Ka Haal; Ba Ba Batao Na	Nadeem–Shravan	
1997	Naseeb	Tumhi Ne Meri Zindagi	Nadeem–Shravan	
1997	Aar Ya Paar	Jo Hoga Hone Do	Viju Shah	
1997	Jeevan Yudh	Sun Sajana Tere Bin	Nadeem–Shravan	
1998	Doli Saja Ke Rakhna	Taram Pam	A. R. Rahman	
1999	Hello Brother	Hata Saawan Ki Ghata	Sajid–Wajid	
2000	Bechainee	Tumse Nahin Koi Pyaara Sanam	Charles Srinivasan	
2000	Kaho Naa... Pyaar Hai	Dil Ne Dil Ko Pukara	Rajesh Roshan	
2000	Dhaai Akshar Prem Ke	Dhaai Akshar Prem Ke; Do Lafzo Mein; Hai Deewane Yeh Ishq Mera; Yeh Sama Yeh Nazare; Koi Taza Hawa; Ek Haseen Ladki	Jatin–Lalit	
2000	Tera Jadoo Chal Gayaa	Chori Chori Chupke Chupke	Ismail Darbar	
2000	Aaghaaz	Aaghaaz Karo; Man Tera Mera Man	Anu Malik	
2000	Kaali Ki Saugandh		Raees	
2001	Chori Chori Chupke Chupke	Chori Chori Chupke Chupke	Anu Malik	
2001	Mujhe Kucch Kehna Hai	Maine Koi Jadoo; Jabse Dekha Hai	Anu Malik	
2001	Yeh Teraa Ghar Yeh Meraa Ghar	Govinda	Anand–Milind	
2001	Kasautii Zindagii Kay	Kasautii Zindagii Kay		TV series
2001	Aamdani Atthanni Kharcha Rupaiya	Style Nasha Tera; Sajanniya Re	Himesh Reshammiya	
2001	Boond	Goriya Re Goriya Re	Rajendara-Liyaqat	
2001	Albela	Hai Mera Dil Tu; Sarse Sarak Gayee	Jatin–Lalit	
2001	Ittefaq	Main Aashiq Hoon	Dilip Sen-Sameer Sen	
2001	Dial 100		Sunil Jha & Raja Sen	
2002	Dil Vil Pyar Vyar	Yeh Jo Mohabbat Hai; Kehna Hai; Ab Ke Saawan Mein; Kehna Hai (Solo)	Babloo Chakravorty	
2002	Jeena Sirf Merre Liye	Jeena Sirf Merre Liye; Pyaar Mange	Nadeem-Shravan	
2002	Kaaboo	Aey Babu	Anchal Talesara	
2002	Company	Pyar Pyar Mein	Sandeep Chowta	
2002	Yeh Kya Ho Raha Hai?	Aarzoo	Shankar–Ehsaan–Loy	
2002	Kya Yehi Pyaar Hai	Meri Tarah Tum Bhi	Sajid–Wajid	
2002	Gunaah	Hamne Tumko Dil Ye De Diya; Jab Dil Churaya	Anand Raj Anand	
2002	Deewangee	Dholi O Dholi	Ismail Darbar	
	Santana	Phaguna re Phaguna	Malay Mishra	Mohammad Mohsin
2003	Dil Ka Rishta	Dil Ka Rishta (Sad)	Nadeem-Shravan	
2003	Hungama	Pari Pari Hai Ek Pari	Nadeem-Shravan	
2003	Chori Chori	Aate Aate	Sajid–Wajid	
2003	Out of Control	Tera Chandsa Yeh Chehera; Kudhi Vi Soni; Tu Mera Hai Sanam	Anand Raj Anand	
2003	Kucch To Hai	Hai Rey	Anu Malik	
2003	Leena On The Chhuk Chhuk Mix	Leena O Leena; Tum Aa Gaye Ho; Chhookar Mere Mann Ko; Meri Pyaari Behniya; Le Jaaynge	Harry Anand	Remix video which had TV actor Eijaz Khan in his first few roles
2003	DJ Hot Remix	Kehdoon Tumhain	Harry Anand	Remix video which had TV actor Eijaz Khan in his first few roles
2003	Escape from Taliban	Rimil Baba	Babul Bose	
2003	Ek Aur Ek Gyarah	Yeh Mann Mera Bada Hi Chaliyan	Shankar–Ehsaan–Loy	
2003	Andaaz	Aayega Maza Ab Barsaat Ka	Nadeem-Shravan	
2003	Zameen	Bas Ek Baar	Himesh Reshammiya	
2003	Wrong Number	Kabhi Jabhi Koi Chehra	Daboo Malik	
2004	Plan	Aane Wala Pal	Anand Raj Anand	
2004	Hum Tum	Hum Tum	Jatin–Lalit	
2004	DJ Hot Remix Vol.2 & The Return Of Kaanta Mix	Tere Jaisa Yaar Kahaan; Kehdoon Tumhain; Yeh Kaali Kaali Aankain; Vaada Karo Nahi Chhodogi Tum Meraa Saath; Khizaan Ke Phool Pe; Leena O Leena	Harry Anand	Remix album
2004	Naam Gum Jaayegaa	Tera Palkein Jo Uthin	Anand–Milind	
2004	Suno Sasurjee	Saason Se Saasein	Sanjeev–Darshan	
2004	Sweet Honey Mix	Pardesiya	Harry Anand	Remix album
2004	Miss Spicy Mix	Pardesiya; Aaj Rapat Jaayn	Harry Anand	Remix album featuring Rakhi Sawant in one of her first few roles
2004	Baby Love – Ek Pardesi Mera Dil Le Gaya	Lekar Hum Deewanaa Dil; Yeh Raat Bheegi Bheegi	Remix album	
2004	DJ Aqeel – Disco 82	Disco 82	DJ Aqeel	Remix album
2004	Play Gal Mix	Mere Piya Gaye Rangoon (Version 2)	Harry Anand	Remix album
2004	Rok Sako To Rok Lo	Haan Mujhe Thaam Le; Rok Sako To Rok Lo	Jatin–Lalit	
2005	Vaada	Main Ishq Uska	Himesh Reshammiya	
2005	DJ Hot Remix Vol 3	Aray Yaar	Harry Anand	Remix album
2005	Chaahat – Ek Nasha	Dil Ki Baat	Anand Raj Anand	
2005	Chehraa	Kabhi Khamosh Baithogi	Anu Malik	
2005	Zameer	Dil Ke Badle Dil To; Tere Pyar Ne Deewana; Zindagi Ke Faisle Mein	Jatin–Lalit	
2005	DJ Hot Remix Vol 4	Pardesiya; Khizzaan Ke Phool Pe	Harry Anand	Remix album
2005	Dus	Chhaam Se	Vishal-Shekhar	
2005	Maine Pyaar Kyun Kiya	Teri Meri Love Story	Himesh Reshammiya	
2005	7½ Phere	Tera Saath Hai Kitna Pyare	Shantanu Moitra	
2006	Fanaa	Chanda Chamke	Jatin–Lalit	
2006	Bombay Vikings – Zara Nazron Se Kahdo	Kehdoon Tumhain; Pardesiya; Khizzaan Ke Phool Pe; Leena O Leena	Harry Anand	Remix album
2006	Sanober & The Masti Express	Pardesiya	Harry Anand	Remix album
2006	Vivah	Hamari Shaadi Mein	Ravindra Jain	
2006	Mantra Shakti		Jackson & Shakeer	
2007	Laaga Chunari Mein Daag	Zara Gungunalein Chalo	Shantanu Moitra	
2010	Sanam Hum Aapke Hain...	Dil Ne Jo Bhi Kaha Maine Manna	Manoj–Vijay	
2018	Laila Majnu	Sarphira	Niladri Kumar	

==== Bengali songs ====
Year	Film	Songs	Composers	Co-singers
2001	Jamaibabu Jindabad	"Jamaibabu Jindabad"	Babul Bose	Priya Bhattacharya
2001	Jamaibabu Jindabad	"Sneher Chayay Bhalobasay"	Babul Bose	Priya Bhattacharya
2001	Pratibad	"Aasbe Ghare Khokon Sona"	Babul Bose	Sadhana Sargam
2001	Pratibad	"Koli Kale Ghore Koli Haar"	Babul Bose	Arshad, Priya Bhattacharya
2001	Bachao	"Aar To Kodin Pore"	Babul Bose	Emon Saha
2001	Bachao	"Amar Ekdike Prithibi"	Babul Bose	Emon Saha
2002	Devdas	N/A	Babul Bose	
2002	Barkane	"Ki Name Dakbo Tomake"	Babul Bose	
2002	Annadata	"Hate Chabi Niye Bose"	Babul Bose	
2002	Annadata	"Amader Katha Sudhu Mane Rekho"	Babul Bose	Sadhana Sargam, Deepa Narayan
2002	Kurukshetra	"Kokhono Megh Kokhono Rodh"	Ashok Bhadra	
2003	Champion	"Kobe Je Amar Naam"	S. P. Venkatesh	
2003	Sangee	"Bombay Kapiye"	S. P. Venkatesh	
2003	Sangee	"Kere Nili" (Happy)	S. P. Venkatesh	Mano
2003	Guru	"Takei Bale Bhalobasa"	Sadhna Sargam	Babul Bose
2004	Dadu No. 1	"Oi Chokhete Misti Hasi"	Malay Ganguly	Shreya Ghoshal
2004	Dadu No. 1	"Ae Bhai Re Are Bol Na Re"	Malay Ganguly	Udit Narayan
2004	Dadu No. 1	"Aj Aei Shubhodine"	Malay Ganguly	Shreya Ghoshal, Udit Narayan
2005	Swapno	"Muche Jaowa Dinguli"	Hemanta Mukherjee, Madhu Mukherjee	
2005	Swapno	"O Akash Sona Sona"	Hemanta Mukherjee, Madhu Mukherjee	Shaan
2005	Yuddho	"Tomar O Chokhete"	Jeet Gannguli	Sadhana Sargam
2005	Yuddho	"Sure Sure Aaj O Mon"	Jeet Gannguli	Sonu Nigam, Shreya Ghoshal, Jeet Gannguli, Sadhana Sargam
2005	Manik	"Subho Janmodin"	Babul Bose	
2005	Manik	"Tomake Peye Chena Prithibi"	Babul Bose	Shreya Ghoshal
2005	Manik	"Ke Dekheche Age"	Babul Bose	
2005	Manik	"Kauke Bhalo Laage"	Babul Bose	Shreya Ghoshal, Priya Bhattacharya
2006	Hero	"Aaha Mori Sundori"		Sabeha
2006	Kranti	"Prithibi Bodle Geche"	Jeet Gannguli	Shreya Ghoshal
2006	Ghatak	"Swapno Koto Swapno Jibone"	Jeet Gannguli	Risha
2006	Ghatak	"Alo Ashar Alo"	Jeet Gannguli	Shreya Ghoshal
2007	I Love You	"Ekta Kotha Bolbo"	Jeet Gannguli	Shreya Ghoshal
2007	I Love You	"Dhure oi Pahar Miseche"	Jeet Gannguli	Shreya Ghoshal, Sweta
2008	10:10	"Kolkata"	Drono Acharya	Sree
2009	Antaheen	"Alo Alo Rong Jomkalo Chand" (Pherari Mon)	Shantanu Moitra	Shreya Ghoshal
2009	Premer Kahini	"Aaj Swopno Sukher"	Jeet Gannguli	Mahalaxmi Iyer
2009	Premer Kahini	"Sangsar Sukhi Hoy Romonir"	Jeet Gannguli	Shreya Ghoshal
2010	Ogo Bodhu Sundori	"Ei To Jibon Jak Na Jedike"	Jeet Gannguli	
2010	Bolo Na Tumi Aamar	"Hate You"	Yuvan Shankar Raja, Jeet Gannguli (Arranger)	Monali Thakur
2011	Bedroom	Piya Tumi	Rupam Islam, Ashok Bhodro	
2011	Bedroom	"Bodle Jay"	Rupam Islam, Ashok Bhodro	
2011	Bedroom	"Bajbe Dudin Pore Biyer Sanai"	Rupam Islam, Ashok Bhodro	
2015	Coke Studio@MTV Season 4 Album	I Wanna Fly	Anupam Roy	Sharmilee Supriyo
2015	Coke Studio@MTV Season 4 Album	Moner Manush	Lalon Fakir, Anupam Roy	Satyaki Banerjee, Anupam Roy
2016	Jodi Jantem Album	Jodi Jantem	Durbadal Chatterjee	
2016	Kotobaro Bhebechinu Album	Kotobaro Bhebechinu	Violin Brothers	
2016	Mone Robe Album	Mone Robe	Atanu Sen	Alka Yagnik
2017	Bengali Puja Song	Aaye Phirey Aaye	Jeet Gannguli	
2018	Kishore Kumar Junior	Sedino Akashe Chilo Kato Tara	Indraadip Dasgupta	
2019	BJP Theme Song	Ei Trinamool R Na		
2019	Gotro	Mashima Hitler	Anindya Chatterjee	
2019	Gumnaami	Subh Sukh Chain	Ram Singh Thakuri	

==== Kannada songs ====
Year	Film	Songs	Composers	Lyrics	Co-singers
2002	Ninagoskara	Prema Lokadinda"	L. N. Shastri	K. Kalyan	Mahalakshmi Iyer

==== Odia songs ====
Supriyo sang Phaguna re Phaguna in Mohammad Mohsin's movie Santana which made him a household name in Odisha. Subsequently, he sang many songs in Odia.

Year	Film	Songs	Composers	Director	Co-singers
2002	Santana	Phaguna Re Phaguna		Mohammad Mohsin	
2006	Rakhi Bandhili Mo Rakhiba Mana		Malay Misra		
2007	To Bina Mo Kahani Adha	Kholide Tora Gabhaa	Santiraj Khosla		
2007	To Bina Mo Kahani Adha	Sabuthu Alagaa Aama Prema	Santiraj Khosla		
2010	Diwana	Tu Tha mu Jachirushi	Malay Misra		
2011	Balunga Toka		Abhijit Mazumdar		
2013	Paribeni Kehi Alaga Kari				

==== Assamese songs ====
Year	Film	Songs	Composers	Lyrics	Co-singers
2000	Jun Jole Kopalot	"Hojau Geetare Godhuli	Jayanta Das	Rubul Bora	Mahalakshmi Iyer
2000	Jun Jole Kopalot	"Kuwasun Kuwana"	Jayanta Das	Rubul Bora	Zubeen Garg, Shaan, Anupam Saikia, Krishnamoni Nath, Jayanta Das
2002	Tyag	"Dekhile Sinaki Hridoy"	Jitu-Tapan	Charukamal Hazarika	Pamela Jain

==== Marathi songs ====
Year	Film	Songs	Composers	Lyrics	Co-singers
2018	Patil	"Dhin Tak Dhin"	Anand–Milind	Sameer	Shreya Ghoshal

== Awards and honours ==
- 2002: Honorary citizenship by the State Council of Atlanta.
- 2002: Bengal Film Journalists' Association Awards: Best Male Playback for Tak Jhal Mishti
- 2003: Kalakar Awards – Best Playback Singer for Kasautii Zindagii Kay
- 2004: Kalakar Awards – Best Playback Singer for Mayer Anchal
- 2006: Bengal Film Journalists' Association – Best Male Playback Award for Subho Drishti.
- 2007: Zee Gold Awards – Best Playback Singer for Kasautii Zindagii Kay
- 2016: Walked at Grande finale show of Indian Federation for Fashion Development's India Runway Week season 6 for designer Agnimitra Paul

== Criticism ==
Babul Supriyo has been criticised for his communal politics before joining Trinamool Congress.

He frequently made derogatory remarks on Rohingyas and Muslim minorities of India.

Lok Sabha
Preceded by Bansa Gopal Chowdhury	Member of Parliament for Asansol; 2014 – 2021	Succeeded by Shatrughan Sinha
