= Sankar Sen =

Indian academic (c.1928–2020)

Power Minister of West Bengal
- In office 1991–1999

West Bengal Legislative Assembly
- In office 1991–2001
- Preceded by: Santi Ranjan Ghatak
- Succeeded by: Arunava Ghosh
- Constituency: Dum Dum

Personal details
- Born: 12 December 1928
- Died: 8 February 2020 (aged 92)
- Party: Communist Party of India (Marxist)

Sankar Sen (c. 1928 – 8 February 2020) was an Indian academic, electrical engineer and politician from West Bengal belonging to Communist Party of India (Marxist). He was the vice chancellor of Jadavpur University. He served as a legislator of the West Bengal Legislative Assembly. He also served as the Minister of Power of the Government of West Bengal from 1991 to 1999.

== Biography ==
Sen was the vice chancellor of Jadavpur University. He was a professor of electrical engineering department of Bengal Engineering College too.

Sen was elected as a legislator of the West Bengal Legislative Assembly from Dum Dum in 1991. He was also elected from Dum Dum in 1996. Besides, he served as the Minister of Power of the Government of West Bengal from 1991 to 1999.

Sen died on 8 February 2020 at the age of 92.
