= 2025 West Bengal teachers' protests =

Protests in West Bengal, India

West Bengal jobless teachers' protests 2025
- Date: April 2025 – ongoing
- Location: West Bengal, India (mainly Kolkata, Howrah, and state government offices)
- Caused by: Annulment of 25,753 teaching and non-teaching posts; Alleged corruption
- Goals: Reinstatement of untainted teachers; Fair recruitment review; Punishment of those responsible for illegal appointments; Job and financial security; Increase in dearness allowance (DA)
- Methods: Sit-ins, rallies, hunger strikes, protest marches, road blockades, picketing of government buildings
- Status: Ongoing (as of 28 July 2025)
- Result: Review process for "untainted" teachers underway; no large-scale reinstatement yet; escalated public, political, and legal debate

Parties
Dismissed school teachers, government employees, support organizations (Sangrami Joutho Manch, others)	Government of West Bengal, West Bengal School Service Commission, law enforcement

Lead figures
	Mamata Banerjee (Chief Minister), Bratya Basu (Education Minister)

Casualties
- Arrested: Several teachers and protestors detained during demonstrations
- Damage: Disruption to public transport and administration; allegations of damage to government property during marches
- Marches and rallies continue as of late July 2025; review of candidates ongoing by state authorities and Supreme Court directives.

The West Bengal jobless teachers' protests 2025 refers to a large-scale and ongoing series of demonstrations by thousands of school staff in West Bengal who lost their jobs following a Supreme Court verdict on the state's teacher recruitment scam. The protests, which have been centered in the state capital of Kolkata since early 2025, represent a major social and political crisis. The core of the issue is the conflict between a judicial order to cancel illegal appointments and the humanitarian situation of nearly 26,000 people being left unemployed, with the most recent major event being a 'Nabanna Chalo' rally on 28 July 2025.

== Background ==
The foundation of the 2025 protests was laid during the teacher recruitment process conducted by the West Bengal School Service Commission (SSC) between 2016 and 2018. Following the recruitment, numerous candidates filed petitions in the Calcutta High Court. They alleged major corruption and irregularities in the process. They claimed that many candidates with high scores were deliberately failed, while jobs were sold to candidates with lower scores for large sums of money.

Investigations by the Central Bureau of Investigation (CBI) and the Enforcement Directorate (ED) uncovered evidence of a widespread scam. The investigation reports suggested that the corruption was systematic. It involved tampering with OMR (Optical Mark Recognition) answer sheets, manipulating marks on the SSC's main server, and creating fake appointment letters. The involvement of middlemen and influential political figures was also alleged, turning the issue into a major political scandal in the state.

A major turning point in the investigation was the arrest of Partha Chatterjee, who was the state's Education Minister when the recruitment took place. In July 2022, the Enforcement Directorate arrested Chatterjee, then a senior cabinet minister, in connection with the scam. The arrest came after the recovery of crores of rupees in cash from the residence of his close associate, which created a sensation across the country and gave significant weight to the allegations of high-level corruption.

== Timeline ==
2016-18
The School Service Commission conducts recruitment for teaching and non-teaching staff in state-run schools.
2021
A series of petitions are filed in the Calcutta High Court alleging corruption in the recruitment process.
July 2022
The Enforcement Directorate (ED) arrests Partha Chatterjee, the then-Education Minister and a senior cabinet minister, in connection with the scam. The arrest follows the recovery of large amounts of cash from the residence of his associate, making national headlines.
April 2024
In a landmark judgment, the Calcutta High Court cancels all 25,753 appointments made through the 2016 selection process, calling the entire process null and void.
May 2024
The West Bengal government and a section of the teachers challenge the High Court's order in the Supreme Court of India.
December 2024
The Supreme Court upholds the Calcutta High Court's decision, confirming the cancellation of all jobs. It noted that the scale of the scam made it impossible to separate the valid appointments from the illegal ones.
March 2025
Protesters organise a massive rally, in Kolkata, which brings the city to a standstill and draws national media attention.
May-June 2025
With no solution in sight, groups of protesters begin indefinite hunger strikes, leading to several hospitalisations.
28 July 2025
Protesters organise a 'Nabanna Chalo' (March to the State Secretariat) rally. The march is stopped by a large police force, leading to a tense standoff for several hours.

== Protest ==
The protests in 2025 have been marked by their persistence and emotional appeals. After losing their jobs, thousands of individuals, many with their families, established a continuous protest site, or 'dharna manch', in the heart of Kolkata.

The movement saw a significant escalation on 28 July 2025, when protesters organised a 'Nabanna Chalo' rally, a march towards the state secretariat. The stated objective was to directly submit a memorandum of their demands to the Chief Minister's office. However, the march, which saw the participation of thousands, was stopped by heavy police barricades and a large police deployment in the Santragachi area, several kilometres away from Nabanna. This led to a tense standoff that lasted for several hours and caused major traffic disruptions in Kolkata and Howrah. The event highlighted the growing frustration among the protesters and the government's firm stance on preventing them from reaching the administrative headquarters.

== Demands ==
The primary and most urgent demand of the protesters is the immediate reinstatement of all 25,753 sacked employees. They argue that the government should find a legal or political way to give them their jobs back. Flowing from this is the demand to separate the innocent from the guilty. Protesters insist that the government and the justice system must identify and punish the real culprits behind the scam, rather than punishing everyone with a blanket order. They feel they are being made scapegoats. Furthermore, they have been appealing directly to Chief Minister Mamata Banerjee to intervene and provide a political solution, believing that only she has the power to resolve this crisis and save their families from financial ruin.

== Response ==
=== West Bengal Government ===
The West Bengal government finds itself in a difficult position, caught between a court order and public pressure. Officially, the government has stated that it is bound by the Supreme Court's verdict and cannot legally reinstate the teachers on its own. Chief Minister Mamata Banerjee has publicly expressed her sympathy for the teachers and their families, while blaming the opposition parties for pursuing the court cases that led to the mass terminations.

The state has explored options to resolve the issue. The most prominent proposal was to create supernumerary posts, which are temporary positions created to accommodate staff. However, this move has been criticised by legal experts and the opposition as an attempt to bypass the court's judgment. As of late July 2025, the government has held several rounds of talks with the protesters but has failed to offer a concrete solution that is both legally sound and acceptable to the teachers.

=== Court Verdict and Legal Position ===
The legal basis for the current situation is the firm stand taken by both the Calcutta High Court and the Supreme Court. The judiciary concluded that the corruption in the 2016 recruitment was so deep and widespread that the entire process was 'vitiated' or contaminated. The courts found it impossible to "separate the grain from the chaff" – meaning, to reliably identify the few genuine candidates from the many who were hired illegally. Because the entire selection list was deemed fraudulent, the only legal remedy was to scrap it completely. This legal position prevents the government from simply re-hiring the teachers without conducting a fresh, transparent recruitment process.

== See also ==
- Partha Chatterjee
- West Bengal School Service Commission
- Government of West Bengal
