= Kalyan Chakraborti =

Indian politician

Minister of Information Technology and Electronics of (West Bengal
- Incumbent
- Assumed office 1 June 2026
- Governor: R. N. Ravi
- Chief Minister: Suvendu Adhikari
- Departments: Information Technology and Electronics
- Preceded by: Babul Supriyo

Minister of Science and Technology and Bio-Technology (West Bengal)
- Incumbent
- Assumed office 1 June 2026
- Preceded by: Ujjal Biswas

Minister of Food Processing Industries and Horticulture (West Bengal)
- Incumbent
- Assumed office 1 June 2026
- Preceded by: Arup Roy

Member of West Bengal Legislative Assembly
- Incumbent
- Assumed office 4 May 2026
- Preceded by: Sovandeb Chattopadhyay
- Constituency: Khardaha

Personal details
- Born: 7 August 1966 (age 60)
- Party: Bharatiya Janata Party
- Education: Bidhan Chandra Krishi Viswavidyalaya (Ph.D.)
- Profession: Professor; Politician

Kalyan Chakraborti is an Indian academic and politician from West Bengal. He is a member of West Bengal Legislative Assembly, from Khardaha Assembly constituency. He is a member of Bharatiya Janata Party. He is currently serving as a Cabinet Minister of West Bengal.
