= Rajesh Khaitan =

Indian politician (1945–2019)

Member, West Bengal Legislative Assembly
- In office 1982–2001
- Preceded by: Rabi Shankar Pandey
- Succeeded by: Tapas Roy
- Constituency: Bara Bazar

Personal details
- Born: 16 February 1945
- Died: 15 December 2019 (aged 74)
- Political party: Indian National Congress(1975-2001); Nationalist Congress Party (2001-2008)

Rajesh Khaitan (February 16, 1945 – 15 December 2019) was an Indian politician from West Bengal belonging to Indian National Congress. He was a legislator of the West Bengal Legislative Assembly.

== Biography ==
Khaitan was elected as a legislator of the West Bengal Legislative Assembly from Bara Bazar in 1982. He was also elected from Bara Bazar in 1987, 1991 and 1996.

Khaitan died on 15 December 2019 at the age of 75.
