= Sovandeb Chattopadhyay =

Indian politician (born 1944)

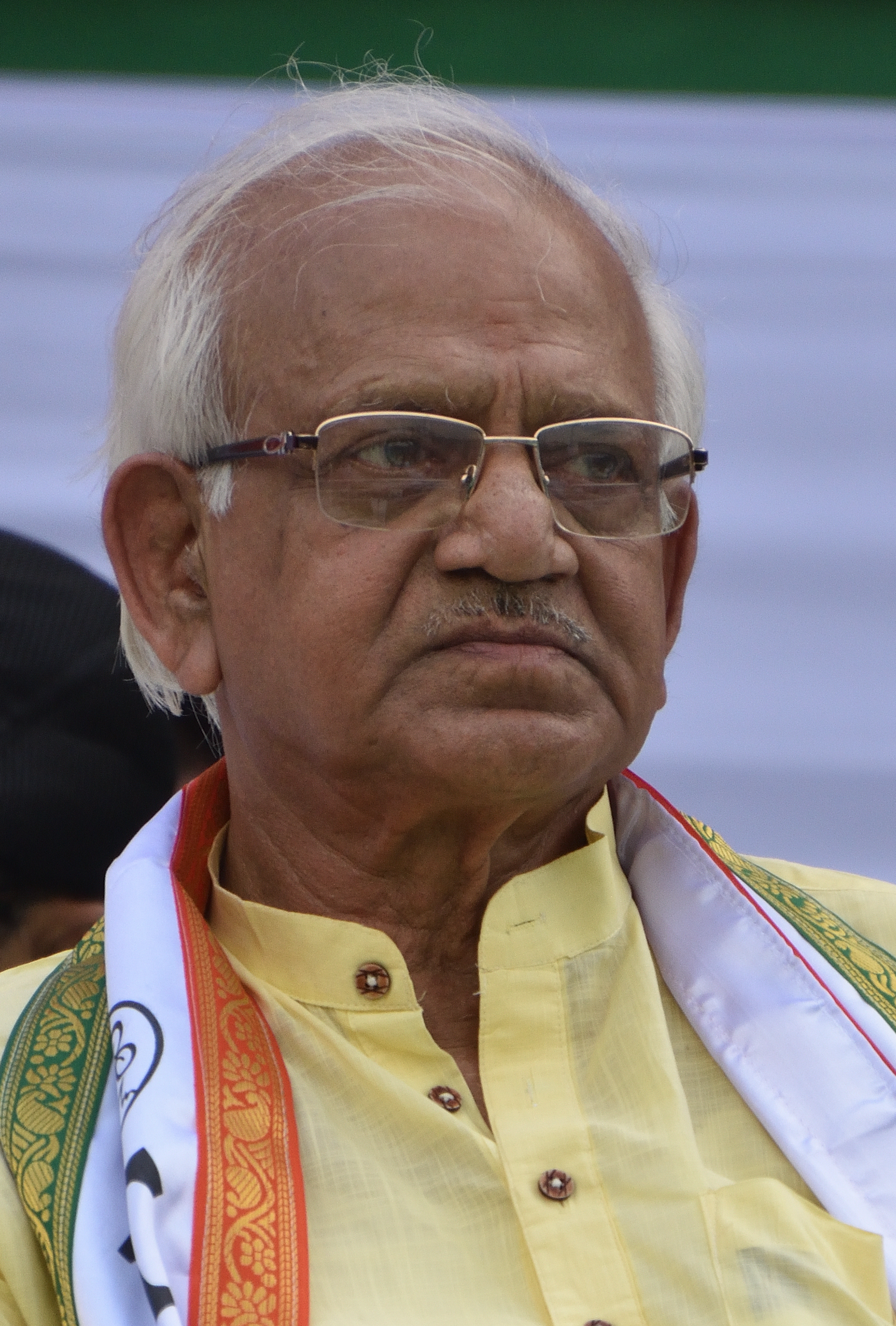
- Chattopadhyay in March 2023

Minister of Legislative Affairs of West Bengal Deputy Leader of the House in West Bengal Legislative Assembly
- In office 5 August 2022 – 7 May 2026
- Chief Minister: Mamata Banerjee
- Preceded by: Partha Chatterjee

Minister of Agriculture of West Bengal
- In office 10 May 2021 – 7 May 2026
- Chief Minister: Mamata Banerjee
- Preceded by: Asish Banerjee

Minister of Power and Non-Conventional Energy of West Bengal
- In office 27 May 2016 – 7 May 2021
- Chief Minister: Mamata Banerjee
- Preceded by: Manish Gupta
- Succeeded by: Aroop Biswas

Chief Whip of the Government of West Bengal
- In office 20 May 2011 – 27 May 2016
- Leader: Mamata Banerjee
- Succeeded by: Nirmal Ghosh

Member of West Bengal Legislative Assembly
- Incumbent
- Assumed office 19 June 1991
- 2026–present: Ballygunge
- 2021–2026 (Note: Elected in a by-election in November 2021.): Khardaha
- 2021 (Note: Resigned on 21 May 2021.): Bhabanipur
- 1998–2021: Rashbehari
- 1991–1998: Baruipur Paschim

Editor of Jago Bangla
- Incumbent
- Assumed office 17 September 2024
- Preceded by: Sukhendu Shekhar Roy

Personal details
- Born: 30 January 1944 (age 82) Calcutta, Bengal Presidency, British India (present-day Kolkata, West Bengal, India)
- Party: All India Trinamool Congress (1998–present) (until 2026); Mamata All India Trinamool Congress (from 2026)
- Other political affiliations: Indian National Congress (1976–1998)
- Spouse: Supriya Chattopadhyay
- Children: 2 sons
- Education: University of Calcutta (B.Sc., LL.B.)

Sovandeb Chattopadhyay (born 30 January 1944) is an Indian politician representing the All India Trinamool Congress and is the first elected MLA of the party (elected in 1998). He was the founder president of INTTUC, the labour wing of All India Trinamool Congress.

== Life and career ==
He is one of the close associates of Mamata Banerjee since mid 80s and was a prominent face in her fights against CPI(M). He is also one of the founding members of Trinamool Congress in 1998.

He was the Government Chief Whip of his first TMC government in the West Bengal Vidhan Sabha from 2011 to 2016. On 27 May 2016 he took charge as the Hon'ble Minister of Power & Non Conventional Energy, Government of West Bengal.

A boxer in his younger days, he is a veteran trade union leader, holding degrees in science and law. He is president of Kolkata Auto Rickshaw Operators' Union. He previously worked in the Kolkata Municipal Corporation as an employee.

He won the Baruipur seat as a Congress candidate in 1991 and 1996 and as a Trinamool Congress candidate won the Rasbehari seat in 2001 and 2006. In 2011 he was pitted against a green-horn and won by nearly 50,000 votes and was further re-elected in 2016. He was the Minister-in-Charge, Department of Agriculture and Parliamentary Affairs in the Government of West Bengal. He resigned from his seat Bhabanipur for CM Mamata Banerjee to contest West Bengal Legislative Assembly by-election. He then contested the by election from Khardaha and won with a margin of 93,832 votes.

During the Banerjee government, he served in the West Bengal Cabinet in various roles and also as the Deputy Leader of the House in West Bengal Legislative Assembly. After AITC's defeat in 2026, he name was suggested as the Leader of the Opposition in the West Bengal Legislative Assembly by Abhishek Banerjee. However, due to irregularities in the process, his appointment was rejected by the speaker.
