= Shashi Panja =

Indian politician

Dr. Shashi Panja
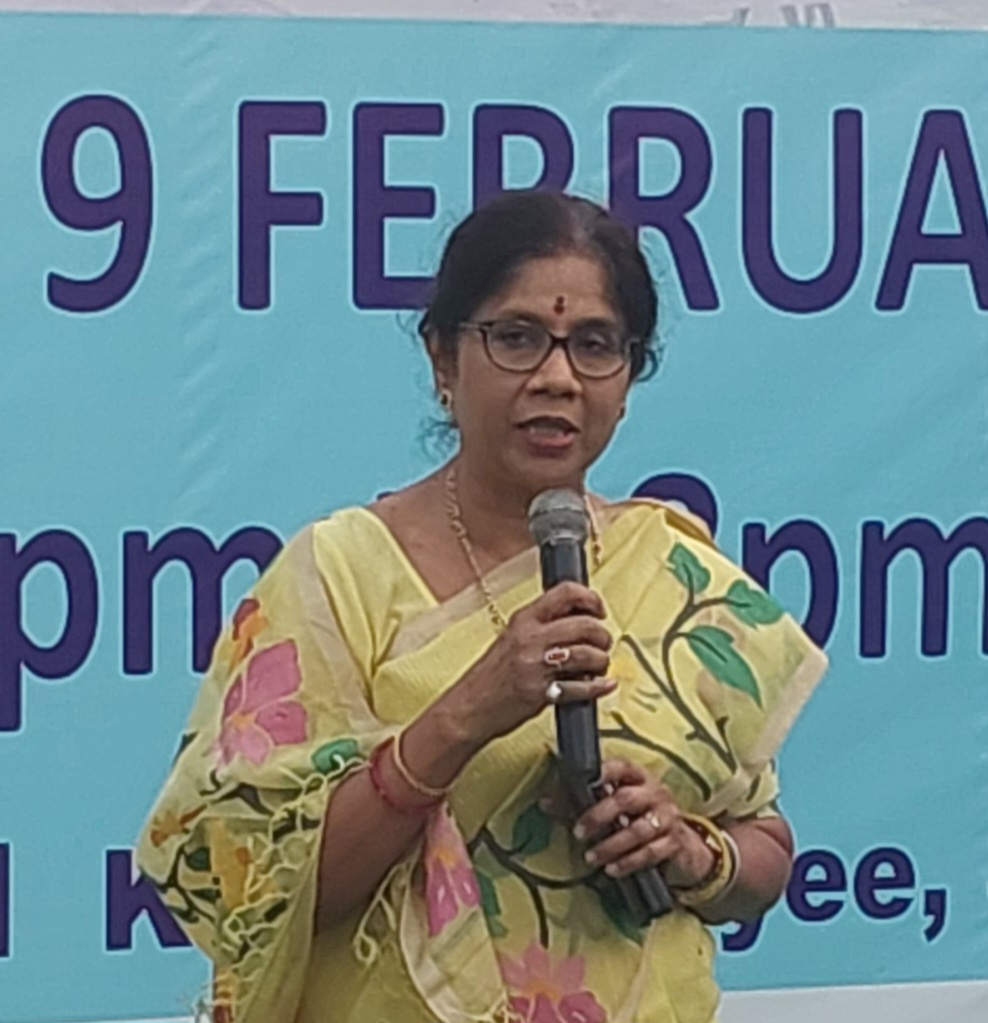
- Panja delivering speech in Kolkata Book Fair c. 2025.

Minister of Commerce and Industries Government of West Bengal
- In office 28 July 2022 – 7 May 2026
- Chief Minister: Mamata Banerjee
- Preceded by: Partha Chatterjee
- Succeeded by: Tapas Roy

Minister of Women, Child Development and Social Welfare Government of West Bengal as Minister of State (Independent Charge) (2013‍–‍2021)
- In office 26 December 2013 – 7 May 2026
- Chief Minister: Mamata Banerjee
- Preceded by: Sabitri Mitra
- Succeeded by: Agnimitra Paul & Malati Rava Roy

Member of the West Bengal Legislative Assembly for Shyampukur
- In office 13 May 2011 – 4 May 2026
- Preceded by: Jiban Prakash Saha
- Succeeded by: Purnima Chakraborty

Personal details
- Born: 4 October 1962 (age 63) Calcutta (now Kolkata), West Bengal
- Party: Trinamool Congress
- Spouse: Prasun Kumar Panja
- Children: Pooja and Namrata
- Education: R. G. Kar Medical College and Hospital

Dr. Shashi Panja is a doctor and politician, a former MLA and former minister who previously served as Cabinet Minister for Industries, Commerce & Enterprises and Department of Women and Child Development and Social Welfare of the Government of West Bengal.

== Early life ==
Panja was born in a Telugu family hailing from Tenali in Andhra Pradesh. Her father Pillalamari T Krishnaiyya was the Chief Industrial Engineer at Hindustan Motors & had settled in the town of Hindmotor. She did her MBBS from R. G. Kar Medical College and Hospital at Kolkata, with specialisation in ultrasound and infertility practice. She married Prasun Kumar Panja, son of the veteran politician Ajit Kumar Panja.

== Political career ==
Panja was elected a councillor of Kolkata Municipal Corporation in 2010 and was appointed mayoral council member in charge of education.

She was elected to the West Bengal State Assembly from Shyampukur (Vidhan Sabha constituency) in 2011 and re-elected in 2016 and 2021 from same constituency. In 2026 Vidhan Sabha election, she was defeated by the BJP candidate.

She was inducted into the Council of Ministers of West Bengal as a minister of state and given independent charge of the women & child welfare ministry in December 2013. In May 2014, she was given additional charge of the social welfare department.

In 2021 she was sworn in as the cabinet minister as a part of the 21st Council of Ministers for the state of West Bengal under the leadership of Mamata Banerjee with the portfolios of Department of Women and Child Development and Social Welfare.
