= Kanailal Bhattacharyya =

Indian politician

- Born: 12 October 1917; Santragachi, Howrah, India
- Died: 17 December 1983 (aged 66); Kolkata
- Education: Presidency College, Narasinha Dutt College
- Occupations: Politician and minister of Govt
- Known for: Educator, social reformer
- Office: West Bengal Commerce and Industries Department
- Term: 1977–1983
- Successor: Jyoti Basu
- Political party: All India Forward Bloc
- Spouse: Bani
- Father: Sishir Kumar Bhattacharyya

Kanailal Bhattacharyya (12 October 1917 – 17 December 1983) was an educator, politician and former minister of Ministry of Commerce & Industries (West Bengal).

== Early life ==
Kanailal Bhattacharyya was born in 1917 to Sishir Kumar Bhattacharyya. From childhood, he lived at Santragachi area. He was early educated in Santragachi Kedarnath Institution, Howrah. He attended Narasinha Dutt College. After that he completed M.Sc. and D.Phil. (Science) degree from Presidency College. He was married to Bani, the daughter of Satyanarayan Biswas.

== Political life ==
Bhattacharyya joined All India Forward Bloc. He was connected with the trade union movement in India and was imprisonex from 1943 to 1945. He was elected a member of the Legislative Assembly for Shibpur in the 1972 and 1977 elections.

== Educator ==
He was a social reformer and educator. He was the minister of West Bengal Ministry of Commerce and Industries from 1977 to 1983. Dr. Kanailal Bhattacharya College is named after him.
