= Mohammad Sohrab =

Indian politician

Member of Legislative Assembly for Bara Bazar
- In office 2006–2011
- Preceded by: Tapas Roy
- Succeeded by: Constituency Dissolved

Personal details
- Party: All India Trinamool Congress (2014-Present); Janata Dal (United)(2011-2014); Rashtriya Janata Dal (2001-2011)

Mohammad Sohrab is an Indian politician belonging to Trinamool Congress. He was elected as MLA of Bara Bazar in 2006 as a Rashtriya Janata Dal candidate. Later he joined Trinamool Congress.
