= Bara Bazar Assembly constituency =

Former West Bengal Legislative Assembly constituency

Coordinates: 22°34′55″N 88°21′07″E

Bara Bazar
- Former constituency No. 144 for the West Bengal Legislative Assembly

Constituency details
- Country: India
- Region: East India
- State: West Bengal
- District: Kolkata
- Lok Sabha constituency: Calcutta North West
- Established: 1951
- Abolished: 2011
- Reservation: None

Bara Bazar Assembly constituency was a Legislative Assembly constituency of Kolkata district in the Indian state of West Bengal.

== Overview ==
As a consequence of the orders of the Delimitation Commission, Bara Bazar Assembly constituency ceases to exist from 2011.

It was part of Calcutta North West (Lok Sabha constituency).

== Members of the Legislative Assembly ==
Election Year	Name of M.L.A.	Party affiliation
1951	Ishwar Das Jalan	Indian National Congress
1957	Ishwar Das Jalan	Indian National Congress
1962	Ishwar Das Jalan	Indian National Congress
1967	Ishwar Das Jalan	Indian National Congress
1969	Ram Krishna Saraogi	Indian National Congress
1971	Ram Krishna Saraogi	Indian National Congress
1972	Ram Krishna Saraogi	Indian National Congress
1977	Rabi Shankar Pandey	Janata Party
1982	Rajesh Khaitan	Indian National Congress
1987	Rajesh Khaitan	Indian National Congress
1991	Rajesh Khaitan	Indian National Congress
1996	Rajesh Khaitan	Indian National Congress
2001	Tapas Roy	All India Trinamool Congress
2006	Mohammad Sohrab	Rashtriya Janata Dal

== Results ==
=== 2006 ===
In the 2006 election, Mohammed Sohrab of Rashtriya Janata Dal defeated his nearest rival Amitabha Chakraborty of Congress.

2006 West Bengal state assembly election: Bara Bazar constituency
Party	Candidate	Votes	%	±%
RJD	Mohammed Sohrab	9,527	34.3	
INC	Amitabha Chakraborty	8,760	31.6	
AITC	Tapas Roy	8,405	30.3	
Independent	Md. Asiruddin	241	0.9	
Independent	Shyamal Chandra Karmakar	193	0.7	
BSP	Rizwan Ahmed Siddique	157	0.5	
Independent	Kanhaiyalal Agarwal	123	0.4	
Independent	Kishore Kumar Mishra	113	0.4	
Independent	Rajiv Roy	82	0.3	
Independent	Dara Singh	63	0.2	
Independent	Manik Chand Bose	54	0.2	
Independent	Kamlesh Kumar Tiwari	25	0.1	
Independent	Janmejoy Pandey	20	0.1	
Majority		767	2.8%	
Turnout		27,772	(42.2%)	
RJD gain from AITC		Swing		

=== 1977-2009 ===
In the 2006 elections to the state assembly, Mohammad Sohrab of RJD won the Burrabazarr seat defeating Amitabha Chakrabarty of Congress. In 2001, Tapas Roy Trinamool Congress defeated Md. Asiruddin of RJD. Rajesh Khaitan of Congress defeated Md Asiruddin of JD in 1996, Satya Narayan Bajaj of JD in 1991, Shaukat Rahmani, Independent, in 1987 and Rabi Shankar Pandey in 1982. In 1977, Rabi Shankar Pandey of Janata Party defeated Ramkrishna Sarogi of Congress.

=== 1951-1972 ===
Ramkrishna Sarogi of Congress won the seat defeating Murlidhar Santhalia of CPI(M) in 1972, Durga Prasad Nathany of Bharatiya Jan Sangh and Ajodhya Singh of CPI(M) in 1971, and Ram Niwas Lakhotia of BJS and Bijay Krishna Dhandhania of Samyukta Socialist Party in 1969. Ishawar Das Jalan of Congress won the seat defeating B.P.Kedia of BJS, and R.S.Pandey of SSP in 1967, Kishan Lal Makharia of CPI) in 1962, Sitaram Seth, Independent, and Sachidanand Pandey of BJS in 1957, and Rashbehari Sarkar of Forward Bloc (Marxists) in independent India’s first general election in 1951.
