= Narasinha Dutt College =

College in West Bengal

- Type: Undergraduate & Postgraduate college
- Established: 1924; 102 years ago
- Affiliations: University of Calcutta
- President: Prof. Prithwish Kr. Roy
- Principal: Dr. Soma Bandyopadhyay
- Location: 129, Belilious Road, Tikiapara, Howrah, West Bengal, 711101, India; 22.592528°N 88.3272793°E
- Campus: Urban
- Website: Narasinha Dutt College

- Location in Kolkata Narasinha Dutt College (India)

Narasinha Dutt College is an undergraduate college in Howrah, West Bengal, India. Established in 1924, it claims to be the oldest college in Howrah district. It is affiliated with the University of Calcutta.

== History ==
Narasinha Dutt College was established in July 1924 in the home of I. R. Belilious, at Howrah. It started with seven teachers and 124 students. The initiative in this regard was taken by Late Suranjan Dutta, the second son of Late Narasinha Dutta. The College started with Motilal Chatterjee as Principal and renowned scholar Jnanendranath Sen as Vice-Principal. Later on Prof. Sen became the Principal and remained in office for a long time to play the role of the architect of the college. Haripada Bharati also served as principal of the college.

With the passage of time, new building came to be erected, enrolment of students steadily picked up and fourteen honours courses were opened. The Morning Shift is exclusively for girls, the Evening Shift exclusively for boys and the Day Shift is Co-educational.

== Departments and courses ==
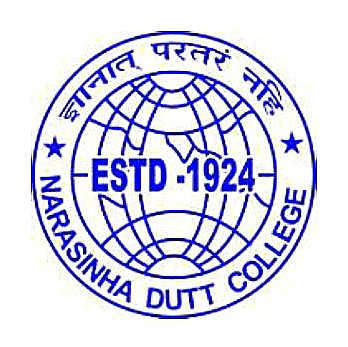
Narasinha Dutt College

The college offers different undergraduate and postgraduate courses and aims at imparting education to the undergraduates of lower- and middle-class people of Howrah and its adjoining areas.

=== Science ===
Science faculty consists of the departments of Chemistry, Physics, Mathematics, Computer Science & Application, Botany, Zoology, Anthropology, and Economics.

=== Arts & Commerce ===
Arts and Commerce faculty consists of departments of Bengali, English, Sanskrit, Urdu, History, Political Science, Philosophy, Education, and Commerce.

== Accreditation ==
Recently, Narasinha Dutt College has been re-accredited and awarded B+ grade by the National Assessment and Accreditation Council (NAAC). The college is also recognized by the University Grants Commission (UGC).

== Notable alumni ==
- Rudranil Ghosh, Actor, Screenplay Writer and Politician.
- Sourav Mukhopadhyay, Bengali author
- Kanailal Bhattacharyya, former minister of Ministry of Commerce & Industries (West Bengal).

== See also ==
- List of colleges affiliated to the University of Calcutta
- Education in India
- Education in West Bengal
