= West Bengal Commission for Women =

State women and child welfare board

- Formation: 3 February 1993; 33 years ago
- Type: Commission
- Headquarters: Jalasampad Bhavan (10th Floor), OF-Block, Sector-I, Bidhannagar, West Bengal-700091
- Official language: Bengali, English
- Chairperson: Leena Gangopadhyay
- Vice Chairperson: Mausam Noor
- Website: Official Website

The West Bengal Commission for Women is a controller board of Department of Women and Child Development and Social Welfare in the Government of West Bengal. It is a women's commission mainly responsible for women development under the administration of the Department of Women and Child Development and Social Welfare.

== History ==
The West Bengal Commission for Women was established in 1993 by the Government of West Bengal. It was founded only for Women protection in the state of West Bengal. The Commission Act was passed by West Bengal Legislative Assembly on 29 July 1992 in the CPI(M) government.

== Composition ==
The West Bengal Commission for Women was formed with a chairperson and other members. The social welfare department of the state makes modalities for appointing the Chairman of the State Commission for Women. Their salary and other emoluments are fixed by state government and revised from time to time.

Leena Ganguly is the Chairperson of the West Bengal Commission for Women. She, along with other members will hold office for a period of 3 years.

== Activities ==
The West Bengal Commission for Women was formed in 1993 to perform the following activities:

- The Commission should ensure that it adheres to the provisions and protection guaranteed for women under the Constitution of India and women-related legislations.
- In case any agency in the state fails to implement protective measures against women, bring the same to the notice of the Government.
- Making recommendations for the amendments in any law if it fails on provision of justice to the women of the state.
- Taking up with the concerned authorities any issue of violation of women's rights and recommending follow-up action to them.
- Women who have complaints of violation of their rights and non-implementation of their protective measures guaranteed under the Constitution of India can directly approach the Women's Commission for redressal.
- Counselling and assisting women who are victims of atrocities and discrimination in the state.
- Financing litigation expenses for any issues involving a mass group of women and occasionally making reports to the state government relating to them.
- Inspecting any premises, jail, or other remand home where women prisoners are lodged or any other case and bringing them to the notice of the respective authorities, in case of need.
- Enquire, study, and investigate any specific women-based issues.
- Initiate educational research or undertake any promotional method and recommend ways for ensuring women's representation in all areas and identifying reasons depriving them of their rights.
- To enquire suo-moto or any complaints of any issue which deprives women of their rights or women protection laws not being implemented or noncompliance of any policies relating to them, or failure of following instructions relating to women's welfare and relief associated with them.

== Commission holders ==
Name	Position
Leena Gangopadhyay	Chairperson
Mausam Noor	Vice Chairperson
N.W. Bhutiya	Member-Secretary
Archana Ghosh Sarkar	Member
Arpita Ghosh Sarkar	Member
Uma Saren	Member
Sunita Saha	Member
Jayeeta Sinha	Member
Maria Fernandes	Member
Aparajita Addhya	Member
Srovonti Bandopadhyay	Member
Dipanwita Hazari	Member
