= Asok Kumar Chattopadhyay =

Indian politician (born 1958)

Member of the West Bengal Legislative Assembly
- Incumbent
- Assumed office 2021
- Preceded by: Milton Rashid
- Constituency: Hansan

Personal details
- Born: 1958 (age 67–68) Rampurhat, Birbhum district, West Bengal
- Party: All India Trinamool Congress
- Education: Doctor of Medicine in Obstetrics and Gynaecology (University of Calcutta)

Asok Kumar Chattopadhyay (born 1958) is an Indian politician from West Bengal. He is a member of the West Bengal Legislative Assembly from Hansan Assembly constituency in Birbhum district. He won the 2021 West Bengal Legislative Assembly election representing the All India Trinamool Congress.

== Early life and education ==
Chattopadhyay is from Rampurhat, Birbhum district, West Bengal. He is the son of late Kamla Kanta Chattopadhyay. He completed his Doctor of Medicine in Obstetrics and Gynaecology in 1989 at University of Calcutta.

== Career ==
Chattopadhyay won from Hansan Assembly constituency representing All India Trinamool Congress in the 2021 West Bengal Legislative Assembly election. He polled 108,289 votes and defeated his nearest rival, Nikhil Banerjee of the Bharatiya Janata Party, by a margin of 50,613 votes.
