= Partha Chatterjee (politician) =

Ex. Minister of School Education of West Bengal

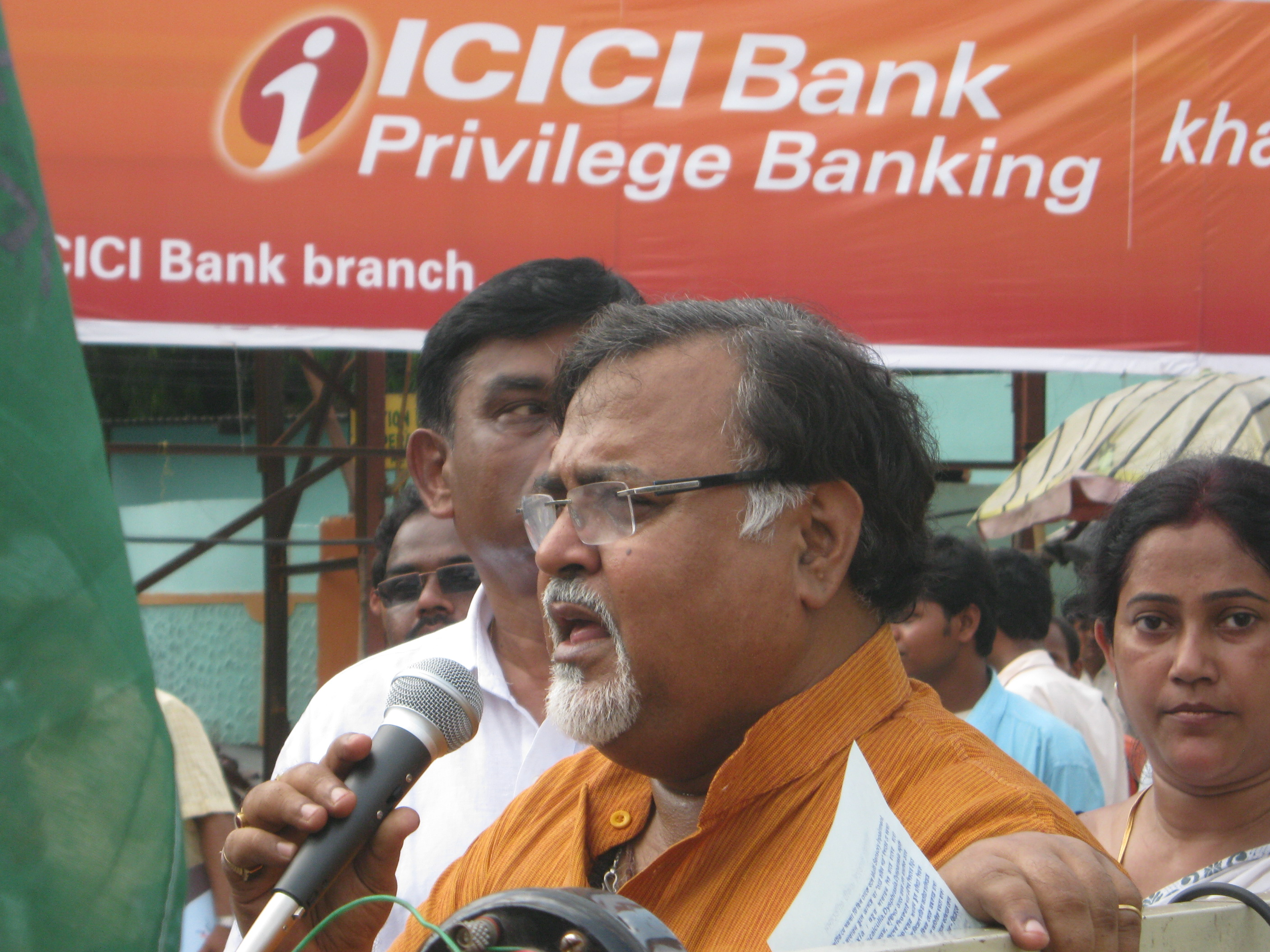

Cabinet Minister, Government of West Bengal
- In office 10 May 2021 – 28 July 2022
- Governor: M.K. Narayanan; Jagdeep Dhankhar; La. Ganesan (additional charge)
- Chief Minister: Mamata Banerjee
- Ministry and Departments: Ministry for Industry, Commerce and Enterprise; Ministry for Information Technology and Electronics; Ministry for Parliamentary Affairs
- Preceded by: Nirupam Sen; Amit Mitra; Sailen Sarkar; Dr. Debesh Das
- Succeeded by: Amit Mitra; Babul Supriyo; Shankar Ghosh (politician)
- In office 20 May 2011 – 20 December 2012
- In office 20 May 2014 – 10 May 2021
- Governor: M.K. Narayanan; D. Y. Patil (additional charge); Keshari Nath Tripathi; Jagdeep Dhankhar
- Chief Minister: Mamata Banerjee
- Ministry and Departments: Ministry of School Education
- Preceded by: Bratya Basu
- Succeeded by: Bratya Basu

Member of the West Bengal Legislative Assembly
- In office 13 May 2001 – 4 May 2026
- Preceded by: Nirmal Mukherjee
- Constituency: Behala Paschim

Leader of the Opposition in West Bengal
- In office 21 September 2006 – 13 May 2011
- Deputy: Abu Hasem Khan Choudhury
- Preceded by: Pankaj Kumar Banerjee
- Succeeded by: Dr Surjya Kanta Mishra
- Constituency: Behala Paschim

Secretary-General of Trinamool Congress
- In office 1998–2022

Editor of Jago Bangla
- In office 2015–2022

Personal details
- Born: 6 October 1952 (age 73) Kolkata, West Bengal, India
- Citizenship: Indian
- Party: Independent (2022–present); Trinamool Congress (1998–2022); Indian National Congress (Until 1998)
- Spouse: Late Babli (Jayasree) Chatterjee
- Children: Sohini Chatterjee
- Education: University of Calcutta (BA); IISWBM (MBA); Ramakrishna Mission Vidyalaya, Narendrapur

Partha Chatterjee (born 6 October 1952) is an Indian politician. He earlier served as the Minister of Commerce and Industries and formerly served as the Education Minister of Government of West Bengal. He represented the Trinamool Congress. He also held the political office of Secretary General of the TMC. On July 28, 2022, he was suspended indefinitely from the party following his arrest by the Enforcement Directorate.

== Early life ==
Chatterjee was born in Calcutta. He attended Ramakrishna Mission Vidyalaya, Narendrapur though some former students of the Mission claimed that he was only there for a year, after which he was given a transfer certificate.

He studied economics from Asutosh College and completed his MBA from IISWBM.

== Political career ==
Chatterjee worked as an HR professional with Andrew Yule.

He was elected as an MLA from Behala Paschim in 2001, and subsequently re-elected from the same constituency in 2006. In 2011 he won by a margin of 59,021 votes. He was Leader of the Opposition in the West Bengal Legislative Assembly from 2006 to 2011.

In the 2016 and 2021 West Bengal assembly elections he was re-elected from the same constituency.

He was sworn in as a Cabinet Minister under Chief Minister Mamata Banerjee on 20 May 2011 and allotted the portfolios of Commerce and Industry, Public Enterprises, Information Technology and Electronics and Parliamentary affairs.

He was nominated as deputy leader of the house in 2011. After the Assembly election 2016, he became the Minister-in-Charge of Higher Education and School Education Department, West Bengal Government and the Ministry of Commerce and Industry, Public Enterprises, Information Technology and Electronics replaced by Amit Mitra.

== Scandal ==
On 23 July 2022, Chatterjee was arrested from his residence by the Enforcement Directorate in connection with the alleged State School Service Commission (SSC) recruitment scam cases along with his aide actress Arpita Mukherjee. He was admitted to SSKM Hospital after complaining of chest pains. Later, he was shifted to AIIMS Bhubaneswar where doctors said that he suffers from chronic diseases but does not need immediate hospitalization. As of 28 July 2022, the Enforcement Directorate has recovered ₹498 million(US$5.96 million) cash, gold worth ₹70 crore(US$8.3 million), ₹5.6 crore(US$670K) worth foreign currency and coded diaries from properties related to him and Arpita Mukherjee.

On 28 July 2022, he was removed as the Minister of Commerce and Industry, Information Technology and Electronics and Parliamentary Affairs and suspended from the Trinamool Congress. On 5 August 2022, he and his aide Arpita Mukherjee were sent to jail custody. He was bailed on 11 November 2025. He is still under trial, but the people of his state proclaim him as a thief as they use the slogans "Partha is a thief ".

Political offices
Preceded by Bratya Basu	Minister of Education in the West Bengal Government; 2014 –	Succeeded by Incumbent
Preceded by ?	Parliamentary Affairs in the West Bengal Government; 2014 –	Succeeded by Incumbent
Preceded by ?	Leader of the Opposition in the West Bengal Legislative Assembly; 2011 – 2016	Succeeded by Surjya Kanta Mishra
