= Department of Women and Child Development and Social Welfare =

State government department in West Bengal, India

Department of Women & Child Development & Social Welfare
Department overview
- Jurisdiction: Government of West Bengal
- Headquarters: Bikash Bhavan, 10th floor, Salt Lake, Kolkata-700091
- Minister responsible: Malati Rava Roy, Minister of State (Independent Charge)
- Department executives: Shri Jagdish Prasad Meena, I.A.S, Secretary, Principal Secretary; Sri Avijit Kumar Mitra, Joint Secretary, Nodal Officer
- Child Department: West Bengal Commission for Women
- Website: Official Website

The Department of Women & Child Development & Social Welfare is a West Bengal government department. It is an interior ministry mainly responsible for the administration of the development of women and child and social welfare.

== List of ministers ==
- Sabitri Mitra
- Shashi Panja (Till 07 May 2026)
- Agnimitra Paul (From 11 May to 11 june 2026)
- Malati Rava Roy (Since 11 june 2026)

== Introduction ==
The Department of Women and Child Development and Social Welfare, Government of West Bengal, is responsible for the development of women and child and social welfare in the state of West Bengal. The Department of Women Development and Social Welfare works towards the protection, equity and inclusion of populations that have been historically oppressed, neglected or excluded from development because of their gender, age, disability or situation. This includes women, senior citizens and other marginalized populations such as persons with disabilities, transgender persons, homeless persons and persons with drug / alcohol addiction.

== Directorate and wings ==
- Directorate of Child Rights and Trafficking (CRT)
- Directorate of Integrated Child Development Services (ICDS)
- Directorate of Integrated Child Protection Scheme (ICPS)
- West Bengal Commission for Protection of Child Rights (CPCR)
- State Child Protection Society (SCPS)
- State Commission for Persons with Disabilities
- Office of the Controller for Vagrancy
- West Bengal Social Welfare Board
- Directorate of Social Welfare
- West Bengal Transgender Persons Development Board
- West Bengal Women Development Undertaking
- West Bengal Commission for Women
- State Resource Center for Women
- West Bengal Task Force on Rescue, Rehabilitation, and Reintegration of Women and Children
- State Mission Authority of the National Mission of Empowerment of Women

== Projects, Programs and Schemes under the department ==
- Annapurna Yojana
- Kanyashree Prakalpa
- Rupashree Prakalpa
- Lakshmir Bhandar
- SABLA
- Indira Gandhi Matritva Sahyog Yojana
- Swawalmban Special
- Muktir Alo
- Old Age Pensions, Widow Pensions and Disability Pensions
- “Little Star” Scheme
