= Tapas Roy =

Indian politician

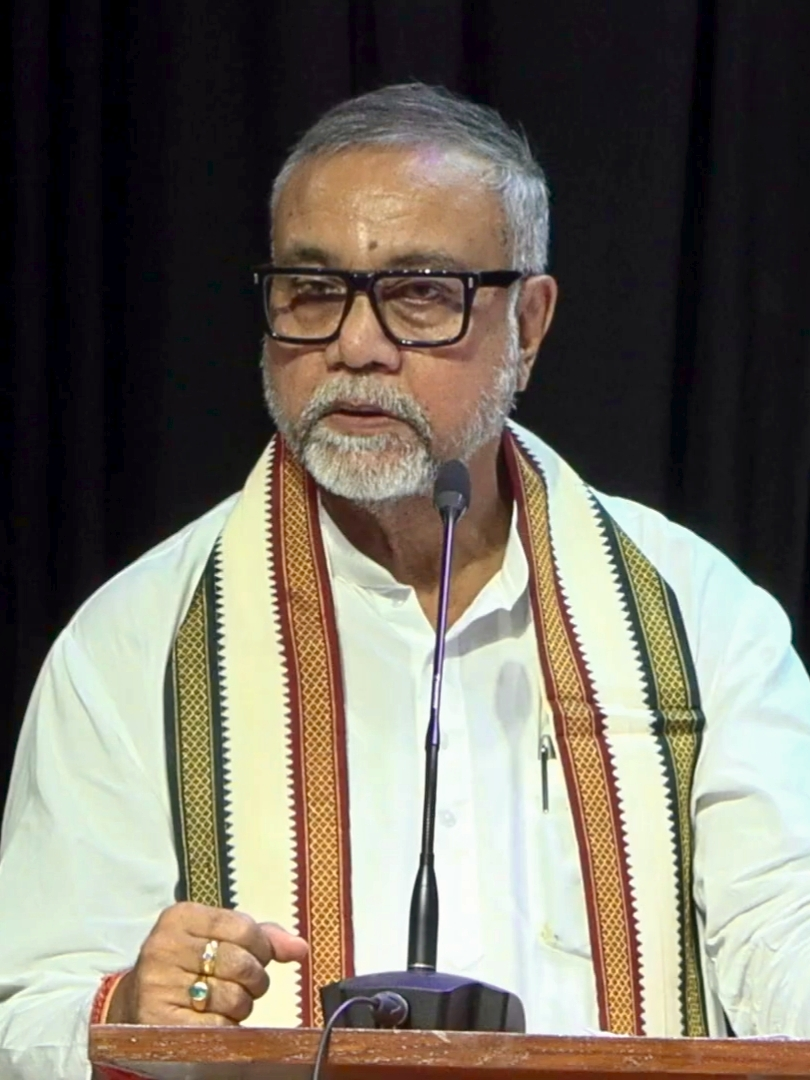
- Roy in 2026

Cabinet Minister, Government of West Bengal
- Incumbent
- Assumed office 1 June 2026
- Governor: R. N. Ravi
- Chief Minister: Suvendu Adhikari
- Departments: Industry, Commerce & Enterprises; Public Enterprises & Industrial Reconstruction; Non-Conventional and Renewable Energy Sources
- Preceded by: Shashi Panja

Member of West Bengal Legislative Assembly
- Incumbent
- Assumed office 4 May 2026
- Preceded by: Supti Pandey
- Constituency: Maniktala
- In office 2011–2024
- Preceded by: Amar Chaudhuri
- Succeeded by: Sayantika Banerjee
- Constituency: Baranagar
- In office 2001–2006
- Preceded by: Rajesh Khaitan
- Succeeded by: Mohammad Sohrab
- Constituency: Bara Bazar
- In office 1996–2001
- Preceded by: Lakshmi Kanta Dey
- Succeeded by: Lakshmi Kanta Dey
- Constituency: Vidyasagar

Minister of State for Statistics, Planning and Programme Implementation (Independent Charge), Government of West Bengal
- In office 2018–2021

Deputy Chief Whip West Bengal Legislative Assembly Government of West Bengal
- Preceded by: Ashima Patra

Councillor of Kolkata Municipal Corporation
- In office 1985–1990
- Constituency: Ward No. 48
- In office 1995–2000
- Constituency: Ward No. 48

Personal details
- Born: 4 July 1956 (age 70) Hindmotor, West Bengal, India
- Party: Bharatiya Janata Party
- Other political affiliations: All India Trinamool Congress (2001–2024); Indian National Congress (1971–2001)
- Education: Surendranath College

Tapas Roy (born 4 July 1956) is an Indian Politician from West Bengal. He is currently serving as the Minister of Commerce and Industries, and also holding key portfolios like,Industry, Commerce & Enterprises, Public Enterprises & Industrial Reconstruction, and Non-Conventional and Renewable Energy Sources. He is serving as an Member of West Bengal Legislative Assembly from Maniktala.

== Early life and education ==
Roy was born on 4 July 1956 in Hindmotor, West Bengal. He grew up in a middle-class Bengali family. His father's name is Amarendra Krishna Roy. His early education is unknown, but he pursued Bachelor of Science (B.Sc.) degree from St. Paul's College under the University of Calcutta in 1982. Subsequently, he completed his degree of Bachelor of Laws (LL.B.) from Surendranath Law College in 1986 under the University of Calcutta.

In his early career, Roy worked as an Advocate and was also involved in Business activities, before entering Politics and Social Work.

== Political career ==
Tapas Roy began his political journey with Indian National Congress, in West Bengal during his college days. He served as a Councillor in the Kolkata Municipal Corporation from Ward No. 48. He served as councillor for 2-terms (1985–1990; 1995–2000).

He was elected as Member of West Bengal Legislative Assembly, from Vidyasagar Assembly constituency, and served full five years term till 2001. In 1998, Roy left Congress, along with the rebel faction of Mamata Banerjee, and joined Trinamool Congress from its foundation. He served as an MLA from Bara Bazar (2001–2006), Baranagar (2011–2024). In this period, he served as Minister of State for Statistics, Planning and Programme Implementation (Independent Charge), Government of West Bengal (2018–2021), Deputy Chief Whip West Bengal Legislative Assembly.

On 12 January 2024, Enforcement Directorate (ED) raided Tapas Roy's Residence. During this time even opposition state party leaders from BJP, INC and CPIM condemned the raid. Investigation agency took some files away, but he was never charged or arrested.

On 4 March 2024, Roy resigned from the primary membership of Trinamool Congresssiting differences with local TMC leader Sudip Bandopadhyay allegeding that he had sent ED officers to his house. Two days later he joined Bharatiya Janata Party on 6 March 2024 on the invitation by the state BJP leadership. He was made candidate for 2024 Indian general election from Kolkata Uttar against 10 time MP, Sudip Bandyopadhyay. But he lost in a close contest and won in Sudip's own booth.

After the 2026 West Bengal Legislative Assembly election, Tapas Roy decisively won from Pande Family's bastion, Maniktala and was made a Cabinet Minister and given key portfolios likeIndustry, Commerce & Enterprises, Public Enterprises & Industrial Reconstruction, and Non-Conventional and Renewable Energy Sources.

He shortly served as the PRO-TEM Speaker in the West Bengal Legislative Assembly in 2026.

== Industrialisation ==
After Taking Charge of Industry, Commerce & Enterprises as minister.

On 17 July 2026, Suvendu Adhikari laid the foundation stone of Shyam Steel's 15,000 crore extension project of a steel plant at Mejia in Bankura district, around 200 km from Kolkata.

Ministry allotted land to Amul (officially Anand Milk Union Limited) for building the largest curd production unit in Sankrail, Howrah,where Amul is said to be investing 700 crore rupees. On 19 July, home minister Amit Shah laid the foundation stone of the plant as the chief guest.

On 17 August, Adhikari laid foundation for Amit Metaliks Steel Plant Extention In Durmut village at Raghunathpur of Purulia district, spanning 148 acres and aimed to stop mass migration by creating about 10000 direct and indirect jobs.
