= Department of Industry, Commerce & Enterprises (West Bengal) =

Government departments of West Bengal

Department overview
- Type: Department
- Jurisdiction: West Bengal
- Headquarters: Camac Street, Kolkata
- Minister responsible: Tapas Roy, Cabinet Minister
- Deputy Minister responsible: Moumita Biswas Mishra, MoS
- Department executive: Smt. Vandana Yadav, I.A.S., Principal Secretary
- Child agencies: West Bengal Industrial Development Corporation Ltd.; West Bengal Mineral Development and Trading Corporation Ltd; West Bengal Industrial Infrastructure Development Corporation; West Bengal Pharmaceutical & Phytochemical Development Corporation Limited; Greater Calcutta Gas Supply Corporation Limited
- Key document: wbindustries.gov.in/policy&scheme.html
- Website: wbindustries.gov.in/index.html

The Department of Industry, Commerce & Enterprises of West Bengal is a Bengal government department, mainly responsible for the functions relating to promotion, regulation and development of large and medium scale industries and trade and commerce in West Bengal.

== Ministerial Team ==
The ministerial team is headed by the Cabinet Minister for Commerce & Industries, currently Vacant due to New Govt. of West Bengal Formed on 09 May 2026. The Cabinet Minister may be supported by Ministers of State. Civil servants are assigned to them to manage the ministers' office and ministry.

== Branches and Cells ==
- Administrative (Admin) Branch
- Audit, Budget & Financial Advisory Branch
- Commerce Branch
- Establishment Branch
- Industrial Promotion & Infrastructure (I.P.I) and Plantation Industries (P.I) Branch
- Law Branch
- Mines Branch
- Petroleum and Natural Gas Branch
- Press & Societies Branch
- Right To Information. Branch
- Grievance Redressal Cell
- Port Cell

== Directorates/Parastatals ==
- Directorate of Industries, West Bengal
- Directorate of Mines & Minerals
- Press & Stationery Offices
- Registrar of Firms, Societies & Non-Trading Corporations

== Corporations ==
- Greater Calcutta Gas Supply Corporation Limited - G.C.G.S.C. Ltd.
- West Bengal Industrial Development Corporation Ltd.- W.B.I.D.C. Ltd.
- West Bengal Industrial Infrastructure Development Corporation - W.B.I.I.D.C.
- West Bengal Mineral Development and Trading Corporation Ltd - W.B.M.D.T.C. Ltd.
- West Bengal Pharmaceutical & Phytochemical Development Corporation Limited - W.B.P.P.D.C. Ltd.

== Previous Ministers-in-charge ==
Previous heads of the department include:

- Dr. Kanailal Bhattacharyya (1977-1983)
- Jyoti Basu (1983-2000)
- Bidyut Ganguly (2000-2001)
- Nirupam Sen (2001-2011)
- Amit Mitra (2011-2021)
- Partha Chatterjee (2021-2022)
- Dr. Shashi Panja (2022- 09 May 2026)
