= Rajib Lochan Saren =

Indian politician

Member of the West Bengal Legislative Assembly
- Incumbent
- Assumed office 2 May 2021
- Preceded by: Susanta Besra
- Constituency: Bandwan

Personal details
- Party: AITC
- Profession: Politician

Rajib Lochan Saren is an Indian politician and member of All India Trinamool Congress. He is an MLA, elected from the Bandwan constituency in the 2016 West Bengal state assembly election. In 2021 assembly election, he was re-elected from the same constituency.
