= Uluberia Dakshin Assembly constituency =

Uluberia Dakshin
- Constituency No. 178 for the West Bengal Legislative Assembly
- Interactive Map Outlining Uluberia Dakshin Assembly Constituency

Constituency details
- Country: India
- Region: East India
- State: West Bengal
- District: Howrah
- Lok Sabha constituency: Uluberia
- Established: 1951
- Total electors: 174,463
- Reservation: None

Member of Legislative Assembly
- 18th West Bengal Legislative Assembly
- Incumbent Pulak Roy
- Party: Democratic Trinamool Congress
- Elected year: 2026

Uluberia Dakshin Assembly constituency is an assembly constituency in Howrah district in the Indian state of West Bengal.

== Overview ==
As per orders of the Delimitation Commission, No. 178 Uluberia Dakshin Assembly constituency is composed of the following: Uluberia I community development block, and Belari, Dhandali, Balichaturi and Nabagram gram panchayats of Shyampur I community development block.

Uluberia Dakshin Assembly constituency is part of No. 26 Uluberia (Lok Sabha constituency).

== Members of the Legislative Assembly ==
Year	Name	Party
Uluberia
1951	Bijoy Mondal	All India Forward Bloc
1951	Bibhuti Bhusan Ghosh	All India Forward Bloc
1957	Abani Kumar Basu	Indian National Congress
1957	Bijoy Bhusan Mondal	All India Forward Bloc
Uluberia South
1962	Abani Kumar Basu	Indian National Congress
1967	Biswanath Das Ghosh	All India Forward Bloc
1969	Biswanath Das Ghosh	All India Forward Bloc
1971	Bata Krishna Das	Communist Party of India (Marxist)
1972	Rabindra Ghosh	Independent politician
1977	Aurobindo Ghosal	All India Forward Bloc
1982	Rabindra Ghosh	All India Forward Bloc
1987	Amar Banerjee	Indian National Congress
1991	Rabindra Ghosh	All India Forward Bloc
1996	Rabindra Ghosh	All India Forward Bloc
2001	Rabindra Ghosh	All India Forward Bloc
2006	Rabindra Ghosh	All India Forward Bloc
Uluberia Dakshin
2011	Pulak Roy	Trinamool Congress
2016	Pulak Roy	Trinamool Congress
2021	Pulak Roy	Trinamool Congress
2026	Pulak Roy	Trinamool Congress

== Election results ==
=== 2026 ===
2026 West Bengal Legislative Assembly election: Uluberia Dakshin
Party	Candidate	Votes	%	±%
AITC	Pulak Roy	109,649	48.46	−1.91
BJP	Mangalananda Puri Maharaj	92,462	40.86	+4.55
AIFB	Amirul Islam Khan	14,709	6.5	−3.94
Independent	Sk Julfikar Ali	2,921	1.29	
NOTA	None of the above	1,446	0.64	−0.09
Majority		17,187	7.6	−6.46
Turnout		226,271	95.43	+10.31
AITC hold		Swing		

=== 2021 ===
2021 West Bengal Legislative Assembly election: Uluberia Dakshin constituency
Party	Candidate	Votes	%	±%
AITC	Pulak Roy	101,880	50.37	
BJP	Papiya Adhikari	73,442	36.31	+24.28
AIFB	Sheikh Kutub Uddin Ahmed	21,110	10.44	−23.73
NOTA	None of the above	1,474	0.73	
Majority		28,438	14.06	
Turnout		202,266	85.12	
AITC hold		Swing		

=== 2016 ===
West Bengal assembly elections, 2016: Uluberia Dakshin constituency
Party	Candidate	Votes	%	±%
AITC	Pulak Roy	95,902	54.11	+4.63
AIFB	Md. Nasiruddin	61,902	34.17	−7.37
BJP	Somnath Sadhukhan	14,239	8.03	+4.15
Independent	Monirul Islam (Mim)	2,575	1.45	
NOTA	None of the above	2,208	1.25	
Indian Unity Centre	Gobardhan Manna	1,757	0.99	
Turnout		177,239	85.33	−0.09
AITC hold		Swing		

=== 2011 ===
West Bengal assembly elections, 2011: Uluberia Dakshin constituency
Party	Candidate	Votes	%	±%
AITC	Pulak Roy	73,734	49.48	+8.25#
AIFB	Sk. Kutubuddin Ahmad	61,902	41.54	−1.17
BJP	Goutam Mukherjee	5,775	3.88	
BSP	Shrinath Yadav	2,149		
Indian Unity Centre	Sakila Begum	1,734		
People’s Democratic Conference of India	Aah Soban Khan	1,448		
Independent	Dipak Kumar Mondal	1,429		
Independent	Sk. Aorangjeb	858		
Turnout		149,029	85.42	
AITC gain from AIFB		Swing	9.42#	

.# Swing calculated on Congress+Trinamool Congress vote percentages taken together in 2006.

=== 2006 ===
In the 2006, 2001, 1996 and 1991 state assembly elections, Rabindra Ghosh of Forward Bloc won the Uluberia South assembly seat, defeating his nearest rivals Pulak Roy of Trinamool Congress in 2006, Bani Kumar Singha of Trinamool Congress in 2001, Pulak Roy of Congress in 1996, and Amar Banerjee of Congress in 1991. Contests in most years were multi cornered but only winners and runners are being mentioned. Amar Banerjee of Congress defeated Rabindra Ghosh of Forward Bloc in 1987. Rabindra Ghosh of Forward Bloc defeated Minati Adhikari of Congress in 1982. Aurobindo Ghosal of Forward Bloc defeated Abani Basu, Independent in 1977.

=== 1972 ===
Rabindra Ghosh, Independent, won in 1972. Bata Krishna Das of CPI(M) won in 1971. Biswanath Das Ghosh of Forward Bloc won in 1969 and 1967. Abani Kumar Basu won the Uluberia South seat in 1962. In 1957 and 1951 Uluberia had a double seat. In 1957 Abani Kumar Basu of Congress and Bijoy Bhusan Mondal of Forward Bloc won. Bijoy Mondal and Bibhuti Bhusan Ghosh, both of All India Forward Bloc (Ruikar) won in 1951.
