= Pulak Roy =

Indian politician

Minister of Public Health Engineering and Panchayat Raj and Rural Development
- In office 10 May 2021 (as Public Health Engineering); 9 November 2021 (as Panchayat Raj and Rural Development) – 7-May-2026
- Governor: Jagdeep Dhankhar; La. Ganesan; C. V. Ananda Bose
- Chief minister: Mamata Banerjee
- Preceded by: Subrata Mukherjee
- Succeeded by: Dilip Ghosh

Personal details
- Party: All India Trinamool Congress (until 2026); Democratic Trinamool Congress (from 2026)
- Education: BA

Pulak Roy is an Indian politician and the Minister of Public Health Engineering in the Government of West Bengal. He is also an MLA, elected from the Uluberia Dakshin constituency in the 2011 West Bengal state assembly election.
