= Department of Power (West Bengal) =

Government departments of West Bengal

Department overview
- Jurisdiction: Government of West Bengal
- Headquarters: Writers' Building, Kolkata
- Minister responsible: Suvendu Adhikari, Minister of Power
- Website: Department of Power

The Department of Power of West Bengal is a Bengal government ministry. It is a ministry mainly responsible for the fulfillment of the demand of electricity in the state. With the enhancement of the generating capacity, it is also emphasizing on the strengthening of transmission and distribution network, especially in rural Bengal. Development of a state-of-the-art Satellite Communication network with statewide coverage has already been undertaken for modernization of various management information systems which would result in betterment of consumer services by the various utilities in the state.

== Ministerial Team ==
The ministerial team is headed by the Cabinet Minister for Power, who may or may not be supported by Ministers of State. Civil servants are assigned to them to manage the ministers' office and ministry.
