= Department of Parliamentary Affairs (West Bengal) =

Govt. Department of West Bengal

Department overview
- Jurisdiction: Government of West Bengal
- Headquarters: Salt Lake, Bidhannagar, Kolkata-700106
- Minister responsible: Shankar Ghosh, Cabinet Minister
- Deputy Minister responsible: Umesh Rai, MoS

The Department of Parliamentary Affairs of West Bengal is a Bengal government ministry. It is a ministry mainly responsible for the smooth functioning and proper programme of business of the Assembly, regulation of relations between the Executive & the Legislature and summoning and prorogation of West Bengal Legislative Assembly, notification of Governor's/President's assent to the Bills, monitoring implementation of various recommendations of the subject committees of West Bengal Legislative Assembly, implementation of the Youth Parliament Competition Schemes (Unit Level & State Level) in schools and Degree Colleges in the State, organising Seminars/Orientations on Parliamentary Practices & Procedures for officers of different Departments of the Government and to render official assistance to the M.L.As of West Bengal Legislative Assembly in case of any eventuality, particularly for the medical treatment of the MLAs in the hospital/nursing homes whenever necessary.

== Ministerial Team ==
The ministerial team is headed by the Cabinet Minister for Parliamentary Affairs, who may or may not be supported by Ministers of State. Civil servants are assigned to them to manage the ministers' office and ministry.
