= Department of Information Technology and Electronics (West Bengal) =

Government department of West Bengal

Department overview
- Type: Department
- Jurisdiction: West Bengal
- Headquarters: "Monibhandar", 6th Floor, Webel Bhavan Complex, Block – EP & GP, Sector- V, saltlake, Kolkata -700091
- Minister responsible: Kalyan Chakraborti
- Department executive: Sumant Sahay, IAS, Joint Secretary
- Child agencies: West Bengal Electronics Industry Development Corporation Limited (WBEIDCL); Institute for Open Technology & Applications (IOTA); Cyber Security Center for Excellence (CS-COE)
- Key documents: State IT Policy 2018; State Data Center Policy 2021

The Department of Information Technology of West Bengal is a ministry under Government of West Bengal. It is a ministry mainly responsible for creating conducive environment for rapid development in IT sector. The official website of the department is https://itewb.gov.in/. The objective of the Department is to shape a digital future for West Bengal.

== Ministerial Team ==
The ministerial team is headed by the Cabinet Minister for Information Technology, who may or may not be supported by Ministers of State. Civil servants are assigned to them to manage the ministers' office and ministry. Government of West Bengal set up IT task Force in March 1999. Based on the recommendation of the Task Force, the State declared IT Policy in January 2000 and set up an independent IT Department in August 2000 with a mandate to create conducive environment for rapid development in IT sector. The objective of the Department is to "Shape a Digital Future for West Bengal".

== IT Infrastructure ==
=== IT Parks ===
==== Operational ====
- Taratala IT Park
- Howrah IT Park
- Haldia IT Park
- Bolpur IT Park
- Kalyani IT Park
- Kharagpur IT Park
- Siliguri IT Park (Ph-II)
- Barjora IT Park
- Purulia IT Park
- Asansol IT Park
- Durgapur IT Park (Ph-II)
- Rajarhat IT Park

==== Ongoing Construction ====
- Bantala IT Park
- Malda IT Park
- Krishnanagar IT Park
- Siliguri IT Park(Phase III)

==== Initial Activities Commenced ====
- Jalpaiguri IT Park
- Kalimpang IT Park
- Darjeeling IT Park
- Chinsurah IT Park
- Sector-V, plot BN-4
- Sector-V, plot DP-6/1 (SDF-II)
- Kalyani (Ph-II)
- Rajarhat IT Park (Ph-II)
- Durgapur IT Park (Ph-III)
- Belur IT Park
- Coochbihar IT Park

=== Incubation Center ===
- Taratala
- Salt Lake
- Durgapur
- Siliguri

== Subsidiary Organisations ==
=== West Bengal Electronics Industry Development Corporation Limited (WBEIDCL) ===
WBEIDCL has the following operational subsidiaries:

- Webel Mediatronics Limited (WML), established in 1981
- Webel Informatics Limited (WIL), established in 1990
- Webel Electronic Communication System Limited (WECS), established in 1981
- Webel Consumer Electronics Limited
- Webel Electro Optics Limited.

=== The Society for Natural Language Technology Research (SNLTR) ===
- Development of Language Tools & Technology
- Development of Online Literary and Linguistic Resources
- Development of Technology for Differently-abled People
- Development of IT enabled educational tools (E-Books and CBTs)

=== Institute for Open Technology & Applications (IOTA) ===
IOTA is a society formed under Department of Information Technology and Electronics, Government of West Bengal, has begun its journey in early 2008. Primarily aim has been promotion and adoption of Free and Open Source Software (FOSS) in the state and making people aware of its advantages. IOTA helps to assemble the fragmented FOSS community into one platform and thereby strengthen the movement towards a noble cause. IOTA has a major focus on school education using Free and Open Source Software and conducts regular training programs in various FOSS applications. IOTA has also occasionally conducts awareness programs which helps to create awareness of FOSS in the state and to inform people about its suitability for sustainable development of the country.

== IT Education & Training ==
- Webel Informatics Limited (WIL) is the IT & Electronics Education and Training arm of West Bengal Electronics Industry Development Corporation (Webel). WIL is one of the very few organizations in India, imparting education and training for more than two decades and has tie ups with Cisco.Inc and Red Hat.
- The Indian Institute of Information Technology (IIIT) is set up at Kalyani, Nadia District by Government of India , Government of West Bengal and Industry Partners on a Not-for-profit Public Private Partnership (N-PPP) basis funded in the ratio of 50:35:15 respectively. Additionally, the Government of West Bengal has lent support to the Institute by granting 50 acres of land for setting up the Campus. IIIT started its classes from the academic year 2014-15 and is currently located in WEBEL IT Park at Kalyani. The institute is being mentored by Indian Institute of Technology, Kharagpur (IIT Kharagpur).
