= Department of Public Enterprises & Industrial Reconstruction (West Bengal) =

Government department of West Bengal

Department overview
- Jurisdiction: Government of West Bengal
- Headquarters: Camac Street, Kolkata
- Minister responsible: Tapas Roy, Cabinet Minister

The Department of Public Enterprises & Industrial Reconstruction of West Bengal is a Bengal government department. It is a department which mainly exercises administrative control over a large number of undertakings in the State sector, so that a co-ordinated policy for their betterment could be implemented. At present 24 Enterprises are under the administrative control of this department.

== Ministerial Team ==
The ministerial team is headed by the Cabinet Minister for Public Enterprises, who may or may not be supported by Ministers of State. Civil servants are assigned to them to manage the ministers' office and ministry.

The current head of the ministry is Tapas Roy, Cabinet Minister.
