= SMVT Bengaluru–Radhikapur Express =

Train in India

SMVT Bengaluru - Radhikapur Express

Overview
- Service type: Express
- Status: Active
- Locale: Karnataka, Tamil Nadu, Andhra Pradesh, Odisha, Bihar and West Bengal
- First service: 22 January 2026; 5 months ago
- Current operator: South Western (SW)

Route
- Termini: SMVT Bengaluru (SMVB); Radhikapur (RDP)
- Stops: 49
- Distance travelled: 2,454 km (1,525 mi)
- Average journey time: 47h 10m
- Service frequency: Weekly
- Train number: 16223 / 16224

On-board services
- Classes: General Unreserved, Sleeper Class, AC 3rd Class, AC 2nd Class
- Seating arrangements: No
- Sleeping arrangements: Yes
- Catering facilities: Pantry Car
- Observation facilities: Large windows
- Baggage facilities: No
- Other facilities: Below the seats

Technical
- Rolling stock: LHB coach
- Track gauge: 1,676 mm (5 ft 6 in)
- Electrification: 25 kV 50 Hz AC Overhead line
- Operating speed: 130 km/h (81 mph) maximum, 52 km/h (32 mph) average including halts.
- Track owner: Indian Railways

The 16223 / 16224 SMVT Bengaluru–Radhikapur Express is an express train belonging to South Western Railway zone that runs between the city SMVT Bengaluru of Karnataka and Radhikapur of West Bengal in India.

It operates as train number 16223 from SMVT Bengaluru to Radhikapur and as train number 16224 in the reverse direction, serving the states of West Bengal, Bihar, Odisha, Andhra Pradesh, Tamil Nadu and Karnataka.

== Services ==
• 16223/ SMVT Bengaluru–Radhikapur Express has an average speed of 53 km/h and covers 2478 km in 46h 55m.

• 16224/ Radhikapur–SMVT Bengaluru Express has an average speed of 52 km/h and covers 2478 km in 47h 15m.

== Route and halts ==
The Important Halts of the train are :

- SMVT Bengaluru
- Krishnarajapuram
- Bangarapet Junction
- Kuppam
- Jolarpettai Junction
- Katpadi Junction
- Arakkonam Junction
- Perambur
- Nayudupeta
- Nellore
- Ongole
- Bapatla
- Tenali Junction
- New Guntur
- Vijayawada Junction
- Eluru
- Tadepalligudem
- Rajahmundry
- Samalkot Junction
- Anakapalle
- Duvvada
- Pendurti
- Kottavalasa Junction
- Vizianagaram Junction
- Srikakulam Road
- Palasa
- Sompeta
- Ichchapuram
- Brahmapur
- Balugaon
- Khurda Road Junction
- Bhubaneswar
- Cuttack Junction
- Jajpur Keonjhar Road
- Bhadrak
- Baleshwar
- Kharagpur Junction
- Andul
- Dankuni Junction
- Barddhaman Junction
- Bolpur Shantiniketan
- Rampurhat Junction
- New Farakka Junction
- Malda Town
- Harischandrapur
- Barsoi Junction
- Raiganj
- Kaliyaganj
- Radhikapur

== Coach composition ==
1. General Unreserved - 4
2. Sleeper Class - 8
3. AC 3rd Class - 5
4. AC 2nd Class - 2

== Traction ==
As the entire route is fully electrified it is hauled by a Krishnarajapuram Shed-based WAP-7 electric locomotive from SMVT Bengaluru to Radhikapur and vice versa.

== Rake share ==
The train has no rake reversal or rake share.

== See also ==
Trains from SMVT Bengaluru:

1. Anga Express
2. SMVT Bengaluru–Murdeshwar Express
3. SMVT Bangalore–Tirupati Intercity Express
4. Howrah–SMVT Bengaluru Duronto Express
5. SMVT Bengaluru–Alipurduar Amrit Bharat Express

Trains from Radhikapur:

1. Kolkata–Radhikapur Express
2. Kulik Intercity Express
3. Radhikapur–Siliguri Express

== Notes ==
a. Runs one day in a week with both directions.
