= Kaliyaganj railway station =

Railway station in West Bengal, India

Kaliyaganj

General information
- Location: NS Road, Taltola, Kaliyaganj, West Bengal; India
- Coordinates: 25.6390°N 88.3275°E
- System: Indian Railways station
- Owner: Indian Railways
- Operator: NFR
- Line: Barsoi–Radhikapur branch line
- Platforms: 2
- Tracks: 3

Construction
- Structure type: Standard on ground
- Parking: Available

Other information
- Status: Active
- Station code: KAJ
- Zone(s): Northeast Frontier Railway
- Division(s): Katihar

History
- Electrified: Yes (in 2023)
- Former names: Assam Behar State Railway
Location
- Location within West Bengal Location within India

Kaliyaganj railway station is an Indian train station which serves Kaliaganj in Uttar Dinajpur district, West Bengal.

== History ==
Katihar was connected to Parbatipur, now in Bangladesh, in 1889, by Assam Behar State Railway.

With the partition of India, links with East Pakistan were lost. The Barsoi–Radhikapur sector became a branch line. In the early 1960s, when Farakka Barrage was being constructed, a more radical change was made. Indian Railways created a new broad-gauge rail link from Calcutta.

The 2,240 m (7,350 ft)-long Farakka Barrage carries a rail-cum-road bridge across the Ganges. The rail bridge was opened in 1971 thereby linking the Barharwa–Azimganj–Katwa loop to Mala Town, New Jalpaiguri and other railway stations in North Bengal.

== Platforms ==
There are a total of 2 platforms and 3 tracks. The platforms are connected by two foot overbridge.

== Station layout ==
| G | Street level | Exit/Entrance & ticket counter |
| P1 | FOB, Side platform, No-1 doors will open on the left/right |
| P1 | Track 1 |
| P1 | Track 2 |
| P1 | Track 3 |
| P1 | FOB, Island platform, No- 2 doors will open on the left/right |

== Improvements ==
In 2006, the Barsoi–Radhikapur branch line had a meter gauge line which was replaced broad gauge line. In 2023 the electrification of this line was completed. It is a single electric-line. In 2023, Prime Minister Narendra Modi launched the Amrit Bharat Station Scheme. According to the scheme, the Ministry of Railways will redevelop railway stations across the country. It has been decided to transform 1309 stations to enhance the overall passenger experience including Kaliyaganj.

== Trains ==
Trains halted in KAJ
| Train no. | Name | From | To | Arrival | Departure | Platform no. |
|---|---|---|---|---|---|---|
| 13145 | Kolkata-Radhikapur Express | KOAA | RDP | 05:40 | 05:42 | 2 |
| 13054 | Kulik Express | RDP | HWH | 05:58 | 06:00 | 1 |
| 13503 | Kulik Express | HWH | RDP | 18:00 | 18:02 | 1 |
| 13146 | Radhikapur-Kolkata Express | RDP | KOAA | 21:15 | 21:17 | 2 |
| 75706 | Siliguri - Radhikapur Express | RDP | SGUJ | 16:12 | 16:14 | 2 |

== See also ==
- Raiganj railway station
- Radhikapur railway station
- Northeast Frontier Railway zone

| Preceding station | Indian Railways | Following station |
|---|---|---|
| Bangalbaree towards Barsoi Junction | Northeast Frontier Railway zone Barsoi–Radhikapur branch line | Dalimgaon towards Radhikapur |
