= First Banerjee ministry =

2011–16 government of West Bengal, India

- 19th Ministry of West Bengal
- 2011—2016
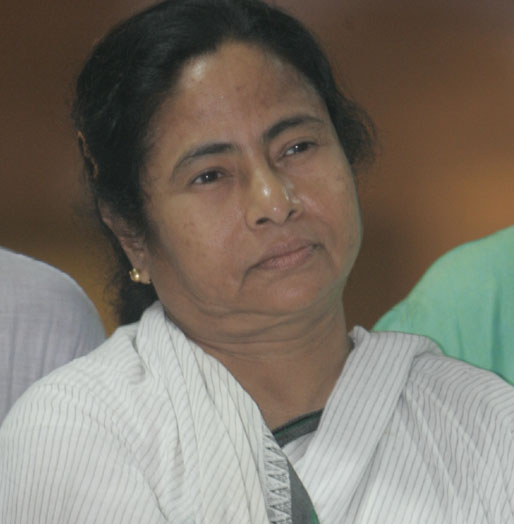
- Date formed: 20 May 2011
- Date dissolved: 25 May 2016

People and organisations
- Governor: M. K. Narayanan D. Y. Patil Keshari Nath Tripathi
- Chief Minister: Mamata Banerjee
- Chief Minister's history: 2011 — present
- No. of ministers: 29 Cabinet Ministers; 5 Minister of state (I/C) (Note: I/C stands for independent charge. It means that a minister can hold portfolios independently in a junior rank.); 8 Minister of state
- Total no. of members: 42
- Member party: All India Trinamool Congress
- Status in legislature: Majority
- Opposition party: Communist Party of India (Marxist)
- Opposition leader: Surya Kanta Mishra

History
- Election: 2011
- Outgoing election: 2006
- Legislature term: 15th Assembly
- Predecessor: Third Bhattacharjee ministry
- Successor: Second Banerjee ministry

The Council of Ministers of West Bengal is the collective decision-making body of the Government of West Bengal, composed of the Chief Minister and the most senior of the government ministers. The Cabinet is the ultimate decision-making body of the executive within the Westminster system of government in traditional constitutional theory.

The Union Council of Ministers of the Government of West Bengal was formed after the 2011 West Bengal state assembly election held in six phases in 2011: on 18 April, 23 April, 27 April, 3 May, 7 and 10 May 2011. The results of the election were announced on 13 May 2011 and led to the formation of the 15th Vidhan Sabha. Mamata Banerjee took oath as the 11th Chief Minister of West Bengal on 20 May 2011, followed by the oath-taking ceremonies of the present 'Council of Ministers'.

== Constitutional requirement ==
=== For the Council of Ministers to aid and advise Governor ===
According to Article 163 of the Indian Constitution,

1. There shall be a Council of Ministers with the Chief Minister at the head to aid and advise the Governor in the exercise of his/her function, except in so far as he/she is by or under this Constitution required to exercise his/her functions or any of them in his/her discretion.
2. If any question arises whether any matter is or is not a matter as respects which the Governor is by or under this Constitution required to act in her/his discretion, the decision of the Governor in her/his discretion shall be final, and the validity of anything done by the Governor shall not be called in question on the ground that he ought or ought not to have acted in her/his discretion.
3. The question whether any, and if so what, advice was tendered by Ministers to the Governor shall not be inquired into in any court.

This means that the Ministers serve under the pleasure of the Governor and he/she may remove them, on the advice of the Chief Minister, whenever they want.

=== For other provisions as to Ministers ===
According to Article 164 of the Indian Constitution,

1. The Chief Minister shall be appointed by the Governor and the other Ministers shall be appointed by the Governor on the advice of the Chief Minister, and the Minister shall hold office during the pleasure of the Governor:
  Provided that in the States of Bihar, Madhya Pradesh and Orissa, there shall be a Minister in charge of tribal welfare who may in addition be in charge of the welfare of the Scheduled Castes and backward classes or any other work.
2. The Council of Minister shall be collectively responsible to the Legislative Assembly of the State.
3. Before a Minister enters upon her/his office, the Governor shall administer to her/him the oaths of office and of secrecy according to the forms set out for the purpose in the Third Schedule.
4. A Minister who for any period of six consecutive months is not a member of the Legislature of the State shall at the expiration of that period cease to be a Minister.
5. The salaries and allowances of Ministers shall be such as the Legislature of the State may from time to time by law determine and, until the Legislature of the State so determines, shall be a specified in the Second Schedule.

== Government and politics ==
The West Bengal is governed through a parliamentary system of representative democracy, a feature the state shares with other Indian states. Universal suffrage is granted to residents. There are two branches of government. The legislature, the West Bengal Legislative Assembly, consists of elected members and special office bearers such as the Speaker and Deputy Speaker, that are elected by the members. Assembly meetings are presided over by the Speaker or the Deputy Speaker in the Speaker's absence. The judiciary is composed of the Calcutta High Court and a system of lower courts. Executive authority is vested in the Council of Ministers headed by the Chief Minister, although the titular head of government is the Governor. The Governor is the head of state appointed by the President of India. The leader of the party or coalition with a majority in the Legislative Assembly is appointed as the Chief Minister by the Governor, and the Council of Ministers are appointed by the Governor on the advice of the Chief Minister. The Council of Ministers reports to the Legislative Assembly. The Assembly is unicameral with 295 Members of the Legislative Assembly, or MLAs, including one nominated from the Anglo-Indian community. Terms of office run for 5 years, unless the Assembly is dissolved prior to the completion of the term. Auxiliary authorities known as panchayats, for which local body elections are regularly held, govern local affairs. The state contributes 42 seats to Lok Sabha and 16 seats to Rajya Sabha of the Indian Parliament.

The main players in the regional politics are the All India Trinamool Congress, the Indian National Congress, the Left Front alliance. Following the West Bengal State Assembly Election in 2011, the All India Trinamool Congress and Indian National Congress coalition under Mamata Banerjee of the All India Trinamool Congress was elected to power (getting 225 seats in the legislature). West Bengal had been ruled by the Left Front for the past 34 years, making it the world's longest-running democratically elected communist government.

== Council of Ministers ==
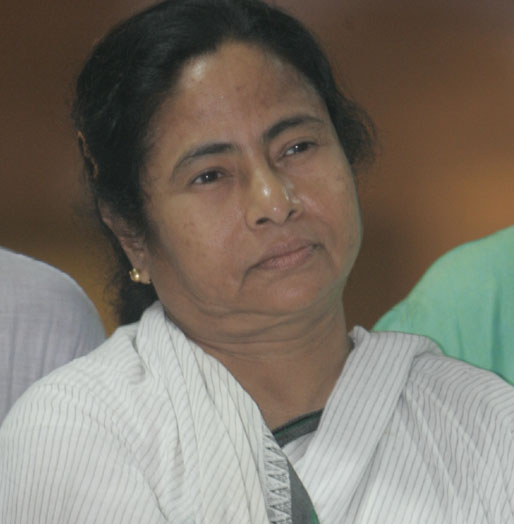
Chief Minister of West Bengal, Mamata Banerjee heads her first Cabinet, May 2011 to present

Mamata Banerjee's Oath of Office
Taking the Oath at Raj Bhavan, Kolkata
Mamata Banerjee takes the oath of office
as Chief Minister administered by Governor M. K. Narayanan on May 20, 2011.

There are a total of 41 ministers, excluding the Chief Minister of West Bengal. This is a list of members of the Council of Ministers of the Government of West Bengal after the 2016 state assembly election. All ministers are based in offices of their respective Ministries in Kolkata. All Cabinet members are mandated by the constitution to be members of the Vidhan Sabha of West Bengal. In a departure from the norm the Chief Minister, Mamata Banerjee, who did not join the cabinet as a member of the Vidhan Sabha.

=== Ranking ===
There are three categories of ministers, in descending order of rank:

- Cabinet Minister: Senior minister in-charge of a ministry. A cabinet minister may also hold additional charges of other Ministries, where no other Cabinet minister is appointed
- Minister of State (Independent Charges): Junior minister not reporting to a cabinet minister
- Minister of State (MoS): Junior minister with overseeing Cabinet Minister, usually tasked with a specific responsibility in that ministry. For instance, an MoS in the Finance Ministry may only handle taxation

=== Cabinet Ministers ===
Sl. No.	Name	Ministries	Constituency
1	Mamata Banerjee	Chief Minister of West Bengal; Also in-charge of: Ministry of Home Affairs; Ministry of Health & Family Welfare; Ministry of Land & Land Reforms; Ministry of Information & Cultural Affairs; Ministry of Hill Affairs; Micro and Small Scale Enterprises; Ministry of Personnel & Administrative Reforms; Ministry of Minority Affairs & Madrassah Education; Ministry of Transport	Bhabanipur
2	Partha Chatterjee	Ministry of Parliamentary Affairs; Minister for Education; Minister of Science & Technology and Biotechnology	Behala Paschim
3	Amit Mitra	Ministry of Finance; Ministry of Excise; Ministry of Commerce and Industry; Ministry of Industrial Reconstruction; Ministry of Public Enterprises; Ministry of Micro, Small & Medium Enterprise and Textile	Khardaha
4	Subrata Mukherjee	Ministry of Panchayat & Rural Development; Ministry of Public Health Engineering	Ballygunge
5	Bratya Basu	Tourism	Dum Dum
6	Jyotipriyo Mullick	Ministry of Food & Supplies	Habra
7	Manish Gupta	Ministry of Power and Non-Conventional Energy	Jadavpur
8	Aroop Biswas	Ministry of Youth Affairs, Sports; Ministry of Housing	Tollygung
9	Firhad Hakim	Ministry of Urban Development and Municipal Affairs	Kolkata Port
10	Sovan Chatterjee	Ministry of Fire & Engineering	Behala Purba
11	Abani Mohan Joardar	Ministry of Correctional Administration; Ministry of Refugee Relief & Rehabilitation	Krishnanagar Uttar
12	Sadhan Pande	Ministry of Self Help Groups; Ministry of Consumer Affairs, Food and Public Distribution	Maniktala
13	Purnendo Bose	Minister for Agriculture; Minister for Technical Education, Training & Skill Development	Rajarhat-Gopalpur
14	Arup Roy	Ministry of Co-operation	Howrah Central
15	Asish Banerjee	Ministry of Biotechnology; Statistics and Programme Monitoring	Rampurhat
16	Javed Khan	Ministry of Disaster Management	Kasba
17	Churamani Mahato	Ministry of Backward Classes Welfare	Gopiballavpur
18	Soumen Mahapatra	Ministry of Water Resources Investigation & Development	Pingla
19	Rabindranath Bhattacharjee	Ministry of Agriculture Marketing; Statistics & Programme Implementation	Singur
20	Goutam Deb	Ministry of North Bengal Development	Dabgram-Phulbari
21	Chandranath Sinha	Ministry of Fisheries	Bolpur
22	Binay Krishna Barman	Ministry of Forest	Mathabhanga
23	Moloy Ghatak	Ministry of Labour; Ministry of Law & Judicial Services	Asansol North
24	Rajib Banerjee	Ministry of Irrigation and Waterways	Domjur
25	Santiram Mahato	Minister for Self Help Group; Self-employment and Pachimanchal unnyan	Balarampur
26	Abdul Karim Chowdhury	Minister for Mass Education Extension and Library Services	Islampur
27	Sankar Chakraborty	Ministry of Public Works Department; Ministry of Cooperation and Inland Water Transport	Balurghat
28	Krishnendu Narayan Choudhury	Ministry of Food processing Ministry of Horticulture	English Bazar
29	Upendra Nath Biswas	Ministry of Backward Class Welfare	Bagda
30	Haider Aziz Safwi	Ministry of Correctional Administration	Uluberia Purba
31	Somen Mahapatra	Ministry of Water Resources Investigation & Development	Tamluk
32	Sudarshan Ghosh Dastidar	Ministry of Environmental Affairs	Mahisadal
33	Noor Alam Chowdhury	Ministry of Animal Resources Development	Murarai
34	Madan Mitra	Minister (without portfolio)	Kamarhati

=== Ministers of State (Independent Charges) ===
Sl. No.	Name	Ministries	Constituency
34	Majulkrishna Thakur	Ministry of Refugee Relief & Rehabilitation; Ministry of State for Micro & Small Scale Enterprises and Textiles	Gaighata
35	Swapan Debnath	Ministry of MSME	Purbasthali South
36	Manturam Pakhira	Ministry of Sunderbans Development	Kakdwip
37	Shashi Panja (Note: The MLA is also a Non-independent Minister of State (MoS))	Minister of Women Development & Social Welfare, Child Development; MoS–Health and Family Welfare	Shyampukur

=== Ministers of State (MoS) ===
Sl. No.	Name	Ministries	Constituency
38	Bachhu Hansda	Ministry of North Bengal Development	Tapan
39	Shyamal Santra	Ministry of Panchayat & Rural Development; Ministry of PHE	Kotulpur
40	Sandhya Rani Tudu	Ministry of Parliamentary Affairs	Manbazar
41	Giasuddin Mollah	Ministry of Minority Affairs Ministry of Madrasah Education	Magrahat Paschim

== Former Ministers ==
S.No	Name	Portrait	Constituency	Assumed office	Left office	Department served	Party
1	Sunil Chandra Tirkey		Phansidewa	20 May 2011	22 September 2012	Ministry of State for Consumer Affairs	INC
2	Pramatha Nath Ray		Kaliaganj	20 May 2011	22 September 2012	Ministry of State for Development & Planning	INC
3	Sabitri Mitra		Manikchak	20 May 2011	24 May 2014	Ministry of Women and Child Development and Social Welfare	AITC
4	Sabina Yeasmin		Mothabari	20 May 2011	22 September 2012	Ministry of State of Security, Counterterrorism and Police	INC
5	Abu Nasar Khan Choudhury		Sujapur	20 May 2011	22 September 2012	Ministry for State for Science and Technology	INC
6	Subrata Saha		Sagardighi	20 May 2011	24 May 2014	Ministry for State for Public Works	AITC
7	Abu Hena		Lalgola	20 May 2011	22 September 2012	Ministry for Fisheries; Ministry for Aqua-culture; Ministry for Harbours	INC
8	Manoj Chakraborty		Baharampur	20 May 2011	18 January 2012	Ministry for State for Parliamentary Affairs	INC
9	Shyamal Mondal		Canning Paschim	20 May 2011	November 2012	Ministry for State for Sunderban Affairs (Independent Charge); Ministry of State for Irrigation and Waterways	AITC
10	Manas Bhunia		Sabang	20 May 2011	25 September 2012	Ministry of Irrigation and Waterways	INC
11	Shyama Prasad Mukherjee		Bishnupur	20 May 2011	2013	Ministry of Textiles	AITC
12	Hiten Barman		Sitalkuchi	20 May 2011	2013	Ministry of Forest	AITC
13	Subrata Bakshi		Bhabanipur	20 May 2011	10 December 2011	Ministry of Transport; Ministry of Public Works Department	AITC
