= Bagdah =

Bagdah or Bagdaha may refer to:

- Bagdah (community development block), a community development block in the state of West Bengal
- Bagdah, North 24 Parganas, a village under the Bagdah CD Block
- Bagdah (Vidhan Sabha constituency), a Vidhan Sabha constituency of West Bengal

== Others ==
- Bagdah High School, a higher secondary school situated at Bagdah
- Bagda, a village in Kutch district in Gujarat
- Bagdaha, Nepal, a village development committee in Sarlahi District in Nepal
