= Kaliaganj =

Kaliaganj Kaliaganj
- Town
- Location in West Bengal, India Kaliaganj (India)
- Coordinates: 25.63°N 88.32°E
- Country: India
- State: West Bengal
- District: North Dinajpur

Government
  - Type: Municipality
  - Body: Kaliaganj Municipality
  - Chairman: Ram Nibas Saha
  - MLA: Soumen Roy (TMC)

Area
  - Total: 11.67 km^{2} (4.51 sq mi)
- Elevation: 40 m (130 ft)

Population (2011)
  - Total: 53,530
  - Density: 4,587/km^{2} (11,880/sq mi)

Languages
  - Official: Bengali, English
- Time zone: UTC+5:30 (IST)
- PIN: 733129
- Telephone code: 03523
- Lok Sabha constituency: Raiganj
- Vidhan Sabha constituency: Kaliaganj

Kaliaganj is a town and a municipality in North Dinajpur district in the Indian state of West Bengal. Kaliaganj is a growing business and commerce region in North Dinajpur district, with rapid urbanisation and improved roadways.

== Etymology ==
The word "Kaliyaganj" is derived from "Kali" + "Ganj", meaning the City of Ma "Kali", and it hosts the famous temple of "Boira Kali Maa". It is a successor city to "Hat Kaliyaganj", a village near Kaliyaganj.

== Geography ==
Cities and towns in the Uttar Dinajpur district
M: municipal city/ town, CT: census town, R: rural/ urban centre, T: tourist centre
Owing to space constraints in the small map, the actual locations in a larger map may vary slightly

=== Police station ===
Kaliaganj police station under West Bengal police has jurisdiction over Kaliaganj town and Kaliaganj CD block. It is 22 km from the district headquarters and covers an area of 301.9 km^{2}. There is a Town Outpost under this PS.

=== CD block HQ ===
The headquarters of Kaliaganj CD block is at Kaliyaganj town.

In the map alongside, all places marked on the map are linked in the full screen version.

== Demographics ==
As per the 2011 Census of India, Kaliyaganj had a total population of 53,530, of which 27,321 (51%) were males and 26,209 (49%) were females. Population below 6 years was 5,105. The total number of literates in Kaliyaganj was 41,622 (85.95% of the population over 6 years).

Religious Demography in Kaliyaganj Town (2011)
1. Hinduism (95.3%)
2. Islam (4.43%)
3. Others (0.27%)
Languages spoken in Kaliyaganj Town (2011)
1. Bengali (85.2%)
2. Hindi (11.8%)
3. Bhojpuri (2.01%)
4. Santali (0.33%)
5. Others (0.63%)

== Transport ==
Kaliyaganj has a station on the Barsoi-Radhikapur branch line.

New broad gauge line from Kaliyaganj to Buniadpur (33.10 km) was included in the budget 2010-11. 157.938 ha of land is to be acquired. As of August 2018, project work by Northeast Frontier Railway is held up mainly because of paucity of funds.

State Highway No. 10A, running from Buniadpur to Raiganj passes through Kaliyaganj town.

Kaliyaganj is connected to major cities like Kolkata, Siliguri, Maharaja Hat etc. via trains and buses as public transportation.

== Economy ==
Although Kaliyaganj is an urban centre, the economy depends greatly on agriculture. There is no specific heavy industry in Kaliyaganj, although there are some smaller ones, especially oil mills.

Vivekananda More (Vivekananda Lane) is the main commercial, shopping and business hub of Kaliagnj. It is located directly near the Kaliyaganj Railway Station as well as the Kaliyaganj bus terminus. It is also located close to Tara Bazar, one of the two main agricultural markets in Kaliyaganj. The other important market is located at Mahendraganj. Mahendraganj was once visited by former Chief Minister of West Bengal, Jyoti Basu.

== Education ==
- Kaliyaganj College was established in 1968. Affiliated to the University of Gour Banga, it offers honours courses in Bengali, English, Hindi, Sanskrit, political science, history, philosophy, economics, physics, chemistry, mathematics, computer science and accounting, and general courses in arts, science and commerce.
- Kaliyaganj College of Education at Krishnabati, Kaliyaganj, offers BEd and D.El.Ed. courses.
- Kaliyaganj Parbati Sundari High School is a co-educational higher secondary school at Schoolpara, Kaliyaganj. Established in 1931, it has arrangements for teaching from class V to XII.
- Kaliyaganj Milanmayee Girls’ High School is a girls only higher secondary school at Schoolpara, Kaliyaganj. Established in 1949, it has arrangements for teaching from class VI to XII.
- Kaliyaganj Sarala Sundari High School.
- Kaliyaganj Manomohan Girls' High School is a girls' school situated at Roy Colony, Kaliyaganj. It is a higher secondary school and was established by Shri Makhanlal Saha in 1968.
- Puria Maheshpur High School.
- Dalimgaon High school (H.S.)
- Pranamananda Vidyapith, associated with Vidya Bharati.
- Nivedita Academy, affiliated to ICSE.

== Healthcare ==
Kaliyaganj State General Hospital, with 60 beds is a major medical facility at Kaliyaganj.

== Kaliyaganj Municipality ==
Kaliyaganj Municipality

Type
- Type: Municipality

History
- Founded: 1987

Leadership
- Chairman: Ram Niwas Saha, AITC

Structure
- Seats: 17
- Political groups: Government (10); AITC: 10: Opposition (7); BJP: 6 IND: 1

Elections
- Last election: 2022
- Next election: 2027

Meeting place
- Headquarters of the Kaliyaganj Municipality

Website
- www.kaliyaganjmunicipality.org

Kaliaganj Municipality (abb. KM) is the civic body responsible for the development and administration of the town of Kaliaganj. It consists of 17 municipal wards.

=== History ===
Kaliyaganj Municipality was founded in the year 1987, comprising Akhanagar, Chirail Para, Chak majlispur, Majlispur, Dhankoil, Rasidpur, Rasidpur, Hariharpur, Mahadevpur, Ratan, Bhander and Shergram, taking only nine wards, when the total population was 26,000.

=== Departments ===
Sl.No.	Department
1	Accounts
2	BCDS Bus terminus
3	Birth and Death
4	Cash
5	Conservancy
6	Disaster Management
6	Electricity
7	Establishment
8	Garage
9	Guest house
10	Health
11	License
12	Market
13	Mid Day Meal
14	NSAP
15	Pension
16	Planning
17	Provident fund
18	PWD
19	Sanitation
20	Stores
21	Tax
22	Water Supply
23	U.P.E.

=== Administration ===
There are 17 wards in the Kaliyaganj Municipality. As per the 2022 West Bengal municipal elections, the All India Trinamool Congress has the majority with 10 wards, while in the opposition, the Bharatiya Janata Party has 6 wards and there is one independent councillor too. Ram Niwas Saha is the incumbent chairman.

== Tourist spots ==
- Vivekananda More
- Loknath Mandir
- Boira Kali Temple
- Radhikapur
- Kaliyaganj municipal park

== Notable people ==
- Priya Ranjan Dasmunsi – Former Union Minister, Government of India.
- Pramatha Nath Ray – Former Cabinet Minister in First Mamata Banerjee ministry, Government of West Bengal.
