= Bankim Chandra Hazra =

Indian politician

Minister of Sundarban Affairs, Government of West Bengal
- Incumbent
- Assumed office 10 May 2021
- Governor: Jagdeep Dhankhar; La. Ganesan (additional charge); C. V. Ananda Bose
- Chief minister: Mamata Banerjee
- Preceded by: Manturam Pakhira

Member of the West Bengal Legislative Assembly
- In office 2011–2026
- Preceded by: Milan Parua
- Succeeded by: Sumanta Mandal
- Constituency: Sagar

Personal details
- Born: 7 November 1949 (age 76)
- Party: Trinamool Congress
- Education: M.Sc.

Bankim Chandra Hazra is an Indian politician and the present Minister of Sundarban Affairs, Government of West Bengal in the Government of West Bengal. He is also an MLA, elected from Sagar constituency in the 2021 West Bengal Legislative Assembly election, in 2011 West Bengal state assembly election. In 2016 and 2021 assembly election he was re-elected from the same constituency.
