= Asima Chowdhuri =

Indian politician

Member of the West Bengal Legislative Assembly
- In office 13 May 2001 – 13 May 2011
- Preceded by: Ram Probesh Mondal
- Succeeded by: Sabitri Mitra
- Constituency: Malatipur

Personal details
- Born: 1944 (age 81–82) English Bazar, West Bengal, India
- Party: Communist Party of India (Marxist)
- Occupation: Politician

Asima Chowdhuri (born 1944) is an Indian politician from West Bengal. She is a former two time member of the West Bengal Legislative Assembly from Manikchak Assembly constituency in Malda district. She was last elected in the 2006 West Bengal Legislative Assembly election representing the Communist Party of India (Marxist).

== Early life and education ==
Chowdhuri is from Manikchak, Malda district, West Bengal. She is the wife of late Subodh Chowdhury. She completed her graduation in arts and teaching.

== Career ==
Chowdhuri was first elected as an MLA winning the 2001 West Bengal Legislative Assembly election representing the Communist Party of India (Marxist) from Manikchak Assembly constituency. She polled 48,239 votes and defeated the Congress candidate, Ram Prabesh Mandal, by a margin of 8,383 votes. She retained the seat for the Communist Party in the 2006 West Bengal Legislative Assembly election. In 2006, she polled 45,660 votes and once again defeated her nearest rival, Ram Prabesh Mandal of the Indian National Congress, who got 40,196. The margin of victory was 5,464 votes.
