= Haripada Baguli =

Indian politician (1952-1957)

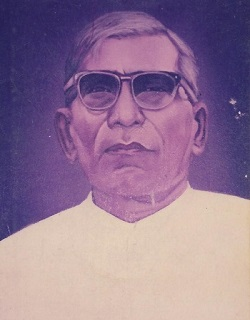
- Sketch image of Haripada Baguli

Member of the West Bengal Legislative Assembly
- In office 1952–1957
- Constituency: Saugar

Personal details
- Born: Haripada Baguli
- Party: Kisan Mazdoor Praja Party

Haripada Baguli (1900 - 1990) was an Indian politician, and a member of West Bengal Legislative Assembly from the Sagar constituency, as a member of the Kisan Mazdoor Praja Party. He was elected in the 1952 West Bengal Legislative Assembly election and served until 1957. He later stood as a candidate of the Praja Socialist Party for the Kakdwip constituency in the 1957 and 1962 elections, but lost both times.

== Electoral history ==
Election Year	Constituency	Party	Result	Source
1952	Saugar	Kisan Mazdoor Praja Party	Won	
1957	Kakdwip	Praja Socialist Party	Lost	
1962	Kakdwip	Praja Socialist Party	Lost	
