= Samsi railway station =

Railway station in West Bengal, India

General information
- Location: Samsi, Malda, West Bengal; India
- Coordinates: 25°27′6″N 88°01′02″E
- Elevation: 30 m (98 ft)
- System: Indian Railways
- Line: Howrah–New Jalpaiguri line
- Platforms: 2

Construction
- Structure type: At grade
- Parking: Available

Other information
- Station code: SM
- Zone(s): Northeast Frontier Railway
- Division(s): Katihar
Location
- Location within West Bengal Location within India

Samsi railway station is a station on the Howrah–New Jalpaiguri line in Malda district of West Bengal, India. It is situated in North East Frontier Zone in Katihar railway division of India.

== Trains ==
Major Trains available from this railway station are as follows:

- Delhi Junction - Kamakhya Brahmaputra Mail
- New Alipuduar - Sealdah Padatik Express
- Sealdah–Silchar Kanchenjunga Express
- Sealdah–Agartala Kanchenjunga Express
- Sealdah-New Alipurdiar Teesta Torsha Express
- Sealdah Saharsha Hate Bazare Express
- Hate Bazare Express (via Purnea)
- Sealdah - Jalpaiguri Road Humsafar Express
- Kolkata–Radhikapur Express
- Kolkata–Jogbani Express
- Howrah Katihar Express
- New Jalpaiguri -Malda Town Express
- Howrah Radhikapur Kulik Express
- Siliguri-Balurghat Express
