= RGJ =

RGJ may refer to:

- Raiganj railway station, in Raiganj, West Bengal, India
- Reno Gazette-Journal, a newspaper in Reno, Nevada, United States
- Royal Green Jackets, an infantry regiment of the British Army
