= Ram Probesh Mondal =

Indian politician

MLA of Manikchak
- In office 1996–2001
- Preceded by: Subodh Choudhary
- Succeeded by: Asima Chowdhuri

Personal details
- Died: 23 June 2018
- Party: All India Trinamool Congress

Ram Probesh Mondal was an Indian teacher and politician belonging to All India Trinamool Congress. He was elected as a member of West Bengal Legislative Assembly from Manikchak in 1996. He died on 23 June 2018.
