= Radhikapur =

- Village
- Location in West Bengal, India Radhikapur (India)
- Coordinates: 25.642778°N 88.446944°E
- Country: India
- State: West Bengal
- District: Uttar Dinajpur

Population (2011)
  - Total: 1,057

Languages
  - Official: Bengali, English
- Time zone: UTC+5:30 (IST)
- PIN: 733129
- STD/ Telephone code: 03523
- Lok Sabha constituency: Raiganj
- Vidhan Sabha constituency: Kaliaganj
- Website: uttardinajpur.nic.in

Radhikapur is a village and a gram panchayat in Kaliaganj CD block in Raiganj subdivision of Uttar Dinajpur district in the state of West Bengal, India. It is a border checkpoint on the Bangladesh-India border.

== Geography ==
=== Location ===
Radhikapur is located at 25.642778°N 88.446944°E.

== Radhikapur-Biral transit point ==
Cities and towns in the Uttar Dinajpur district
M: municipal city/ town, CT: census town, R: rural/ urban centre, T: tourist centre
Owing to space constraints in the small map, the actual locations in a larger map may vary slightly

The Radhikapur-Birol rail link was put back in operation in April 2017.

It was a defunct rail transit point on the India-Bangladesh border for a long time. The corresponding station on the Bangladesh side is Biral in Dinajpur District. The transit facility in the Radhikapur-Birol sector had remained suspended since 1 April 2005. The railway track on the Indian side had been converted to 5 ft 6 in (1,676 mm) broad gauge while that on the Bangladesh side it continued to remain metre gauge.

As per the Memorandum of Understanding entered into by Bangladesh and India on 15 August 1978 it was agreed to facilitate overland transit traffic between Bangladesh and Nepal. An addendum was made on 6 September 2011, to add new rail routes for facilitating overland transit traffic between Bangladesh and Nepal.

Bangladesh started export of fertilizer to Nepal utilizing the Rahanpur-Singhabad transit point in November 2011.

In the map alongside, all places marked on the map are linked in the full screen version.

== Land customs station ==
Radhikapur has a land customs station for movement of goods by road or rail on the India-Bangladesh border.

== Demographics ==
As per the 2011 Census of India, Radhikapur had a total population of 1,057, of which 530 (50%) were males and 527 (50%) were females. Population below 6 years was 134. The total number of literates in Radhikapur was 675 (73.13% of the population over 6 years).

== Transport ==
Radhikapur railway station is on the Barsoi-Radhikapur branch line.
