= Utpal Brahmacharo =

Indian politician

Member of the West Bengal Legislative Assembly
- Incumbent
- Assumed office 4 May 2026
- Preceded by: Soumen Roy
- Constituency: Kaliaganj

Personal details
- Party: Bharatiya Janata Party
- Profession: Politician; Monk

Utpal Brahmacharo(Maharaj) is an Indian politician, monk and member of the Bharatiya Janata Party. He was elected as a Member of the West Bengal Legislative Assembly from the Kaliaganj constituency in the 2026 West Bengal Legislative Assembly election.
