= Gour Chandra Mandal =

Indian politician (Born 1979)

Member of the West Bengal Legislative Assembly
- Incumbent
- Assumed office 4 May 2026
- Preceded by: Sabitri Mitra
- Constituency: Manikchak

Personal details
- Party: Bharatiya Janata Party
- Profession: Politician

Gour Chandra Mandal is an Indian politician and member of the Bharatiya Janata Party. He was elected as a Member of the West Bengal Legislative Assembly from the Manikchak constituency in the 2026 West Bengal Legislative Assembly election.
