= Md. Mottakin Alam =

Indian politician

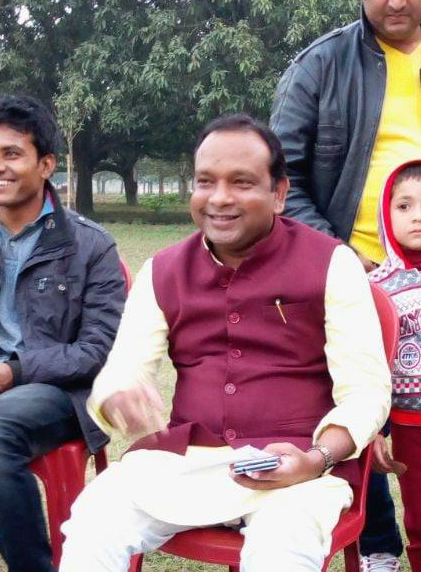

Member of the West Bengal Legislative Assembly
- In office 2016–2021
- Preceded by: Sabitri Mitra
- Succeeded by: Sabitri Mitra
- Constituency: Manikchak

Personal details
- Born: 1979 (age 46–47) English Bazar, West Bengal, India
- Party: Indian National Congress
- Occupation: Politician

Mohammad Mottakin Alam (born 1979) is an Indian politician from West Bengal. He is a former member of the West Bengal Legislative Assembly from Manikchak Assembly constituency in Malda district. He was elected in the 1996 West Bengal Legislative Assembly election representing the Indian National Congress.

== Early life and education ==
Alam is from English Bazar, Malda district, West Bengal. He is the son of late Ali Mohammad. He studied Class 10 at Jadupur Anchal High School and passed the examinations conducted by West Bengal Board of Secondary Education in 1996.

== Career ==
Alam was first elected as an MLA from Manikchak Assembly constituency representing the Indian National Congress in the 1996 West Bengal Legislative Assembly election. He polled 78,472 votes and defeated his nearest rival, Sabitri Mitra of the All India Trinamool Congress, by a margin of 12,603 votes. He lost the next election in 2021 and could finish only third. Sabitri Mitra of the Trinamool Congress won the 2021 West Bengal Legislative Assembly election defeating Gour Chand Mandal of the Bharatiya Janata Party. Sitting MLA Alam could only poll 11,555 votes while winner Mitra got 110,234 votes.
