= Kulik Intercity Express =

Train in India

Kulik Express

Overview
- Service type: Express
- First service: 22 January 2011; 15 years ago
- Current operator: Eastern Railway

Route
- Termini: Howrah (HWH); Radhikapur (RDP)
- Stops: 12
- Distance travelled: 487 km (303 mi)
- Average journey time: 9 Hours 35 Minutes
- Service frequency: Daily (Note: Runs seven days in a week for every direction.)
- Train number: 13053 / 13054

On-board services
- Classes: AC Chair Car, General Unreserved, Second Class Seating
- Seating arrangements: Yes
- Sleeping arrangements: No
- Auto-rack arrangements: Overhead racks
- Catering facilities: E-catering
- Observation facilities: Large windows
- Entertainment facilities: No
- Baggage facilities: Available
- Other facilities: Below the seats

Technical
- Rolling stock: LHB coach
- Track gauge: 1,676 mm (5 ft 6 in)
- Operating speed: 51 km/h (32 mph) average including halts.

The 13053 / 13054 Kulik Express is an express train belonging to Eastern Railway zone that runs between Howrah Junction and Radhikapur via Rampurhat Junction in India. It is currently being operated with 13053/13054 train numbers on a daily basis.

Till 30 June 2019, it was run as Siuri Intercity Express up to Siuri. After 1 July 2019, it was extended to Radhikapur and named as Howrah–Radhikapur Express. And after some time on 25 April 2020, it was renamed as Kulik Express after the Kulik Bird Sanctuary of Raiganj.

== Speed ==
This train has an average speed of 46 km/h and covers 487 km in 10 Hours 40 Minutes. The maximum permissible speed of this train is 110 km/h

== Route and halts ==
Between Howrah Junction and Radhikapur this train stops at -

- Bandel Junction
- Barddhaman Junction
- Bolpur Shantiniketan
- Prantik
- Sainthia Junction
- Rampurhat Junction
- Pakur
- New Farakka Junction
- Malda Town
- Samsi
- Barsoi Junction
- Raiganj
- Kaliyaganj

Note: Bold letters indicates Major Railway Stations/Major Cities.

== Coach composition ==
The train runs with Modern LHB Rake with max speed of 110 km/h. The train consists of 13 coaches:

- 1 AC Chair Car
- 5 Unreserved Chair Car
- 4 Reserved Chair Car
- 2 Deen dayalu coaches
- 2 Generators cum Luggage/parcel van

== Schedule ==
The schedule of this 13053/13054 Howrah–Radhikapur Kulik Express is given below:-

HWH - RDP - HWH Kulik Express
| 13053 | | Stations | 13054 | |
|---|---|---|---|---|
| Arrival | Departure | Stations | Arrival | Departure |
| -NIL- | 08:55 | Howrah Junction | 15:50 | -NIL- |
| 09:46 | 09:48 | Bandel Junction | 14:48 | 14:50 |
| 10:51 | 10:53 | Barddhaman Junction | 13:30 | 13:32 |
| 11:38 | 11:40 | Bolpur Shantiniketan | 12:31 | 12:33 |
| 11:50 | 11:51 | Prantik | 12:24 | 12:25 |
| 12:26 | 12:28 | Sainthia | 11:58 | 12:00 |
| 13:01 | 13:03 | Rampurhat Junction | 11:33 | 11:35 |
| 13:43 | 13:45 | Pakur | 10:45 | 10:47 |
| 14:56 | 14:58 | New Farakka Junction | 10:02 | 10:04 |
| 15:50 | 16:20 | Malda Town | 09:05 | 09:30 |
| 16:48 | 16:50 | Samsi | 07:45 | 07:47 |
| 17:38 | 17:40 | Barsoi Junction | 06:43 | 06:45 |
| 17:58 | 18:03 | Raiganj | 06:20 | 06:25 |
| 18:32 | 18:34 | Kaliyaganj | 05:58 | 06:00 |
| 19:15 | -NIL- | Radhikapur | -NIL- | 05:45 |

== Traction ==
Both trains are hauled by a Howrah based WAP-5 or WAP-7 from Radhikapur to Howrah .

== See also ==
- Howrah Junction railway station
- Radhikapur railway station
- Howrah–Rampurhat Express
- Howrah–Balurghat Bi-Weekly Express
- Kolkata–Radhikapur Express
