= Manikchak Assembly constituency =

Manikchak
- Constituency No. 49 for the West Bengal Legislative Assembly
- Interactive Map Outlining Manikchak Assembly Constituency

Constituency details
- Country: India
- Region: East India
- State: West Bengal
- District: Malda
- Lok Sabha constituency: Maldaha Dakshin
- Established: 1951
- Total electors: 253,353
- Reservation: None

Member of Legislative Assembly
- 18th West Bengal Legislative Assembly
- Incumbent Gour Chandra Mandal
- Party: Bharatiya Janata Party
- Elected year: 2026

Manikchak Assembly constituency is an assembly constituency in Malda district in the Indian state of West Bengal.

== Overview ==
As per orders of the Delimitation Commission, No. 49 Manikchak Assembly constituency covers Manikchak community development block, and Milki, Fulbaria and Sovanagar gram panchayats of English Bazar community development block.

Manikchak Assembly constituency is part of No. 8 Maldaha Dakshin (Lok Sabha constituency). It was earlier part of Malda (Lok Sabha constituency).

== Members of the Legislative Assembly ==
Year	Name	Party
1951	Pashupati Jha	Indian National Congress
1957	No seat	
1962	Sowrindra Mohan Misra	Indian National Congress
1967	R. S. Singhi	Swatantra Party
1969	Arun Chandra Jha	Indian National Congress
1971	Jokhilal Mandal	Indian National Congress
1972	Jokhilal Mandal	Indian National Congress
1977	Subodh Choudhary	Communist Party of India (Marxist)
1982	Jokhilal Mandal	Indian National Congress
1987	Jokhilal Mandal	Indian National Congress
1991	Subodh Choudhary	Communist Party of India (Marxist)
1996	Ram Probesh Mondal	Indian National Congress
2001	Asima Chowdhuri	Communist Party of India (Marxist)
2006	Asima Chowdhuri	Communist Party of India (Marxist)
2011	Sabitri Mitra	Trinamool Congress
2016	Md. Mottakin Alam	Indian National Congress
2021	Sabitri Mitra	Trinamool Congress
2026	Gour Chandra Mandal	Bharatiya Janata Party

== Election results ==
=== 2026 ===
2026 West Bengal Legislative Assembly election: Manikchak
Party	Candidate	Votes	%	±%
BJP	Gour Chandra Mandal	110,118	48.86	+11.97
AITC	Kabita Mandal	96,180	42.68	−10.58
INC	Ansarul Hoque	9,201	4.08	−1.5
CPI(M)	Debajyoti Sinha (Babu)	6,499	2.88	
NOTA	None of the above	1,201	0.53	−0.13
Majority		13,938	6.18	−10.19
Turnout		225,363	95.28	+13.58
BJP gain from AITC		Swing		

=== 2021 ===
2021 West Bengal Legislative Assembly election: Manikchak
Party	Candidate	Votes	%	±%
AITC	Sabitri Mitra	110,234	53.26	
BJP	Gour Chand Mandal	76,356	36.89	
INC	Md. Mottakin Alam	11,555	5.58	
Independent	Anil Ch. Mandal	2,743	1.33	
NOTA	None of the above	1,367	0.66	
Majority		33,878	16.37	
Turnout		206,991	81.7	
AITC gain from INC		Swing		

=== 2016 ===
West Bengal assembly elections, 2016: Manikchak constituency
Party	Candidate	Votes	%	±%
INC	Md. Mottakin Alam	78472		
AITC	Sabitri Mitra	65869		−2.54
BJP				
IPFB				
BSP				
Turnout			80.14	
AITC gain from CPI(M)		Swing		

=== 2011 ===
In the 2011 elections, Sabitri Mitra of Trinamool Congress defeated her nearest rival Ratna Bhattacharya of CPI(M).

West Bengal assembly elections, 2011: Manikchak constituency
Party	Candidate	Votes	%	±%
AITC	Sabitri Mitra	64,641	46.20	+4.23#
CPI(M)	Ratna Bhattacharya	58,424	41.75	−2.54
BJP	Dipankar Panday	8,003	5.72	
IPFB	Lutpha Khatub	5,194	3.71	
BSP	Chanchala Karmakar	3,668		
Turnout		139,930	80.14	
AITC gain from CPI(M)		Swing	+6.77#	

Ramprabesh Mandal, who had filed his nomination as an independent candidate was a rebel Congress candidate. He withdrew on the last day for withdrawal of nominations.

.# Swing based on Congress+Trinamool Congress vote percentages taken together in 2006.

=== 2006 ===
In the 2006 and 2001 state assembly elections, Asima Chowdhuri of CPI(M) won the Manikchak assembly seat defeating her nearest rival Ram Probesh Mondal of Congress. Contests in most years were multi cornered but only winners and runners are being mentioned. Ram Probesh Mondal of Congress defeated Subodh Choudhary of CPI(M) in 1996. Subodh Choudhary of CPI(M) defeated Ram Probesh Mondal of Congress in 1991 Jokhilal Mandal of Congress in 1987. Jokhilal Mandal of Congress defeated Subodh Choudhary of CPI(M) in 1982. Subodh Choudhary of CPI(M) defeated Jokhilal Mandal of Congress in 1977.

=== 1972 ===
Jokhilal Mandal of Congress won in 1972 and 1971. Arun Chandra Jha of Congress won in 1969. R.S.Singhi of Swatantra Party won in 1967. Sowrindra Mohan Misra of Congress won in 1962. The Manikchak seat was not there in 1957. In independent India's first election in 1951, Pashupati Jha of Congress won from the Manikchak seat.
