= Pramatha Nath Ray =

Indian politician

Pramatha Nath Roy

Minister of State for Development & Planning
- In office 20 May 2011 – 22 September 2012
- Governor: M. K. Narayanan
- Chief Minister: Mamata Banerjee
- Preceded by: Upen Kisku
- Succeeded by: Rachhpal Singh

Member of the West Bengal Legislative Assembly
- In office 13 May 2011 – 31 May 2019
- Governor: M. K. Narayanan; D. Y. Patil; Keshari Nath Tripathi
- Chief Minister: Mamata Banerjee
- Preceded by: Nani Gopal Roy
- Succeeded by: Tapan Deb Singha
- Constituency: Kaliaganj
- In office 10 May 1996 – 11 May 2006
- Governor: K. V. Raghunatha Reddy; Akhlaq Ur Rehman Kidwai; Shyamal Kumar Sen; Viren J. Shah; Gopalkrishna Gandhi
- Chief Minister: Jyoti Basu; Buddhadeb Bhattacharya
- Preceded by: Ramani Kanti Debsarma
- Succeeded by: Nani Gopal Roy
- Constituency: Kaliaganj

Personal details
- Born: October 7, 1944 Kaliaganj
- Died: May 31, 2019 (aged 74) Kolkata
- Party: Indian National Congress
- Children: 2

Pramatha Nath Roy (7 October 1944 - 31 May 2019), popularly known as P. N. Roy, was an Indian politician and was the Minister of State for Development & Planning in the Government of West Bengal. He was an MLA, elected from the Kaliaganj Assembly constituency in 1996, 2001, 2011 and 2016.

He resigned from the ministry when Congress withdrew its support to the Mamata Banerjee government in September 2012.

== Personal life ==
Pramatha Nath Roy was a postgraduate in humanities.

== Death ==
P. N. Roy died on 31 May 2019 at the age of 74 in Kolkata, triggering a bypoll in the constituency, which was won by Tapan Deb Singha of the All India Trinamool Congress.
