= Siliguri Junction–Radhikapur Express =

Train of India

Siliguri - Radhikapur Express

Overview
- Service type: Superfast
- Locale: West Bengal, Bihar
- First service: 9 March 2024; 2 years ago
- Current operator: Northeast Frontier Railway zone

Route
- Termini: Radhikapur; Siliguri Junction
- Stops: 09
- Distance travelled: 218 km (135 mi)
- Average journey time: 5 hours 00 mins
- Service frequency: Daily
- Train number: 75706 / 75705

On-board services
- Classes: Second Sitting (2S), Unreserved (UR)
- Seating arrangements: Yes
- Sleeping arrangements: No
- Catering facilities: No

Technical
- Rolling stock: Standard Indian Railways coaches
- Track gauge: 1,676 mm (5 ft 6 in)
- Operating speed: 44 km/h (27 mph)

The 75706/05 Siliguri Junction–Radhikapur Express is an DEMU Express train belonging to Indian Railways Northeast Frontier Railway zone that runs between Radhikapur and Siliguri Junction of West Bengal in India. It was launched by Honourable Prime Minister of India, Shri Narendra Modi on 9 March 2024 in Siliguri. It operates as train number 75706 from Siliguri Junction to Radhikapur and as train number 75705 in the reverse direction serving the states of Bihar & West Bengal.

== Service ==
The train starts from Siliguri Junction at 06:00 am and arrives at Radhikapur at 11:00 am. For reverse direction the train leaves Radhikapur at 16:00 and arrives at Siliguri Junction at 21:30.

== Route ==
The route of this train is as follows:

- Siliguri Junction
- Bagdogra
- Naxalbari
- Adhikari
- Thakurganj
- Aluabari Road Junction
- Kishanganj
- Dalkhola
- Barsoi Junction (Reversal)
- Raiganj
- Kaliyaganj
- Radhikapur

== Reversal ==
The train reverses its direction in Barsoi Junction.
