= Tapan Deb Singha =

Indian politician

Member of the West Bengal Legislative Assembly
- In office 28 November 2019 – 2 May 2021
- Preceded by: Pramatha Nath Ray
- Succeeded by: Soumen Roy
- Constituency: Kaliaganj

Personal details
- Born: 1959/60
- Party: All India Trinamool Congress
- Education: Kolkata University
- Occupation: Politician

Tapan Deb Singha is an Indian politician from West Bengal belonging to All India Trinamool Congress. He is a former member of the West Bengal Legislative Assembly.

== Biography ==
Singha graduated from Kolkata University in 1991. He was elected to the West Bengal Legislative Assembly from Kaliaganj on 28 November 2019. This was the first win for any All India Trinamool Congress candidate from the Kaliaganj constituency.
