= Sagar, West Bengal Assembly constituency =

West Bengal Legislative Assembly constituency

Coordinates: 21.65°N 88.08°E

Sagar
- Constituency No. 132 for the West Bengal Legislative Assembly
- Interactive Map Outlining Sagar Assembly Constituency

Constituency details
- Country: India
- Region: East India
- State: West Bengal
- District: South 24 Parganas
- Lok Sabha constituency: Mathurapur
- Established: 1951
- Total electors: 274,310
- Reservation: None

Member of Legislative Assembly
- 18th West Bengal Legislative Assembly
- Incumbent Sumanta Mandal
- Party: BJP
- Alliance: NDA
- Elected year: 2026

Sagar Assembly constituency is a Legislative Assembly constituency of South 24 Parganas district in the Indian State of West Bengal.

== Overview ==
As per order of the Delimitation Commission in respect of the Delimitation of constituencies in the West Bengal, Sagar Assembly constituency is composed of the following:

- Sagar community development block
- Frezarganj, Haripur, Mausini, Namkhana and Shibrampur gram panchayats of Namkhana community development block

Sagar Assembly constituency is a part of No. 20 Mathurapur Lok Sabha constituency.

== Members of Legislative Assembly ==
Election Year	Member	Party
1952	Haripada Baguli	Kisan Mazdoor Praja Party
1957 - 1967	Seat didn't exist	
1967	T. Mishra	Indian National Congress
1969	Govardhan Dengal	Bangla Congress
1971	Prabhanjan Kumar Mondal	Communist Party of India (Marxist)
1972	Prabhanjan Kumar Mondal	Communist Party of India (Marxist)
1977	Hrishikesh Maity	Communist Party of India (Marxist)
1982	Prabhanjan Kumar Mondal	Communist Party of India (Marxist)
1987	Prabhanjan Kumar Mondal	Communist Party of India (Marxist)
1991	Prabhanjan Kumar Mondal	Communist Party of India (Marxist)
1996	Prabhanjan Kumar Mondal	Communist Party of India (Marxist)
2001	Bankim Chandra Hazra	Trinamool Congress
2006	Milan Parua	Communist Party of India (Marxist)
2011	Bankim Chandra Hazra	Trinamool Congress
2016	Bankim Chandra Hazra	Trinamool Congress
2021	Bankim Chandra Hazra	Trinamool Congress
2026	Sumanta Mandal	Bharatiya Janata Party

== Election results ==
=== 2026 ===
2026 West Bengal Legislative Assembly election: Sagar
Party	Candidate	Votes	%	±%
BJP	Sumanta Mandal	127,802	49.52	▲8.04
AITC	Bankim Chandra Hazra	119,921	46.46	▼7.5
CPI(M)	Swapan Singha	7,630	2.96	▼0.84
NOTA	None of the above	600	0.23	▼0.2
Majority		7,881	3.06	▼9.42
Turnout		258,107	94.03	▲7.01
BJP gain from AITC		Swing		

=== 2021 ===
2021 West Bengal Legislative Assembly election: Sagar
Party	Candidate	Votes	%	±%
AITC	Bankim Chandra Hazra	129,000	53.96	▲2.17
BJP	Bikash Kamila	99,154	41.48	▲38.18
CPI(M)	Sheikh Muklesur Rahaman	9,096	3.8	▼39.7
NOTA	None of the above	1,025	0.43	
Majority		29,846	12.48	
Turnout		239,067	87.02	
AITC hold		Swing		

=== 2016 ===
2016 West Bengal Legislative Assembly election: Sagar
Party	Candidate	Votes	%	±%
AITC	Bankim Chandra Hazra	112,812	51.79	▲1.40
CPI(M)	Ashim Kumar Mandal	94,741	43.50	▼2.53
BJP	Sarbori Mukherjee	7,177	3.30	▲1.59
NOTA	None of the above	1,472	0.68	New entry
Independent	Sankhabaran Sahoo	762	0.35	New entry
SUCI(C)	Kamalendu Pani	489	0.22	New entry
LJP	Ashok Barman	353	0.16	New entry
Majority		18,071	8.29	▲3.93
Turnout		2,17,806	89.61	▼2.26
AITC hold		Swing		

=== 2011 ===
2011 West Bengal Legislative Assembly election: Sagar
Party	Candidate	Votes	%	±%
AITC	Bankim Chandra Hazra	94,264	50.39	
CPI(M)	Milan Parua	86,115	46.03	
BJP	Bimal Maity	3,193	1.71	
PDCI	Anup Das	1,437	0.77	
JD(U)	Dilip Pramanik	1,216	0.65	
IJP	Gorachand Mondal	853	0.46	
Majority		8,149	4.36	
Turnout		1,87,078	91.87	
AITC gain from CPI(M)		Swing		

=== 2006 ===
In 2006, Milan Parua of CPI(M) won the Sagar Assembly constituency defeating his nearest rival Bankim Chandra Hazra of AITC. Bankim Chandra Hazra of AITC defeated Prabahanjan Mondal of CPI(M) in 2001. Prabhanjan Mondal of CPI(M) defeated Haripada Sen of INC in 1996, Anil Baran Maitry of INC in 1991, Byomkes Maity of INC in 1987, Haripada Sen of INC in 1982 and Govardhan Dengal of Janata Party in 1977.

=== 1972 ===
Prabhanjan Mondal of CPI(M) won in 1972 and 1971. Govardhan Dengal of Bangla Congress won in 1969. T. Mishra of INC won in 1967. The Sagar Assembly constituency was not there in 1962 and 1957. Haripada Baguli of KMPP won in 1952.
