= Sumanta Mandal =

Indian politician (born 1987)

Member of the West Bengal Legislative Assembly
- Incumbent
- Assumed office 4 May 2026
- Preceded by: Bankim Chandra Hazra
- Constituency: Sagar

Personal details
- Party: Bharatiya Janata Party
- Profession: Politician

Sumanta Mandal (born 1987) is an Indian politician from West Bengal. He is a member of the West Bengal Legislative Assembly from the Sagar, West Bengal Assembly constituency in South 24 Parganas district representing the Bharatiya Janata Party.

== Early life and education ==
Mandal is from Sagar, South 24 Parganas district, West Bengal. He is the son of Harekrishna Mandal. He completed his Master of Science (honours) at Chhatrapati Shahu Ji Maharaj University, Kanpur in 2009. He is a teacher. He declared assets worth Rs.39 lakhs in his affidavit to the Election Commission of India.

== Career ==
Mandal won the Sagar Assembly constituency representing the Bharatiya Janata Party in the 2026 West Bengal Legislative Assembly election. He polled 1,27,802 votes and defeated his nearest rival and three time sitting MLA, Bankim Chandra Hazra of the All India Trinamool Congress by a margin of 7,881 votes.

== See also ==
- 2026 West Bengal Legislative Assembly election
- List of chief ministers of West Bengal
- West Bengal Legislative Assembly
- 18th West Bengal Assembly
