= Sabitri Mitra =

Indian politician

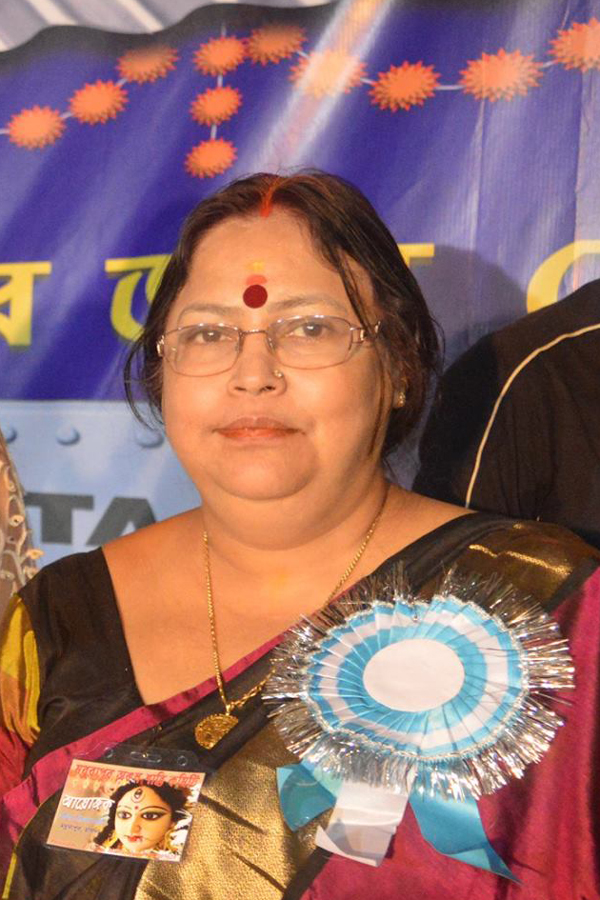

Cabinet Minister, Government of West Bengal
- In office 20 May 2011 – May 2014
- Governor: M. K. Narayanan
- Minister of: Women and Child Development and Social Welfare
- Chief Minister: Mamata Banerjee
- Preceded by: Biswanath Chowdhury
- Succeeded by: Shashi Panja

Member of West Bengal Legislative Assembly
- In office 1991–2011
- Constituency: Araidanga
- In office 13 May 2011 – 20 May 2016
- Governor: M. K. Narayanan
- Preceded by: Asima Chowdhury
- Succeeded by: Md. Mottakin Alam
- Constituency: Manikchak

Member of West Bengal Legislative Assembly
- In office 2 May 2021 – 4 May 2026
- Preceded by: Md. Mottakin Alam
- Succeeded by: Gour Chandra Mandal
- Constituency: Manikchak

Personal details
- Born: 1960 (age 65–66) Malda, West Bengal, India
- Party: Trinamool Congress (2011–present); Indian National Congress (1991–2011)
- Spouse: Swapan Mitra
- Education: Debipur R. L. Saha High School (M.P.)

Sabitri Mitra is an Indian politician, belonging to the Trinamool Congress, who has served as Cabinet Minister of Women and Child Development and Social Welfare in the Government of West Bengal. She has also served as MLA for Manikchak constituency from 2011 until 2016 and again since 2021 to 2026

== Political career ==
She earlier served as MLA of Araidanga constituency in Malda district from 1991 until 2011, when she defected from the Indian National Congress to join the Trinamool Congress. In the 2011 election, she won the Manikchak constituency with 64,641 votes, defeating her immediate rival, Ratna Bhattacharya of the CPI(M) by 6,217 votes.

== Ministerial berths ==
She was sworn in as the Minister for Women & Child Development and Social Welfare by the Governor on the advice of Chief Minister Mamata Banerjee. She is one of the 34 ministers in the Council of Ministers of West Bengal, who hold the Cabinet Minister rank. She was earlier affiliated with the Indian National Congress party but defected to the Trinamool Congress in 2011. She also served as the Vice-President of the West Bengal People's Congress Committee (WBPCC) during her affiliation with the INC. Her strained relationship with WBPCC President and now Minister for Irrigation & Inland Waterways and Small & Micro Enterprises and Textiles in the Government of West Bengal, Manas Bhunia, has been widely publicized.

One of the first decisions she took as the Minister for Women & Child Development and Social Welfare in the Government of West Bengal was to dismiss any retired officials in her Ministry still clinging on to their jobs. She also froze the number of new appointments under the Integrated Child Development Services in various districts, saying there were irregularities in the manner the appointments were made, as these appointments were made in back dates. Apart from Chief Minister Mamata Banerjee, Mitra was the only other woman in the 38-member strong Council of Ministers of West Bengal.

Sabitri Mitra was divested of her portfolio and retained as minister without portfolio in May 2014.
