= Dipankar Jana =

Indian politician and social worker

Minister of State, Government of West Bengal
- Incumbent
- Assumed office 1 June 2026
- Governor: R. N. Ravi
- Chief Minister: Suvendu Adhikari

Member of the West Bengal Legislative Assembly
- Incumbent
- Assumed office 4 May 2026
- Preceded by: Manturam Pakhira
- Constituency: Kakdwip

Personal details
- Born: 1970 (age 55–56) West Bengal, India
- Party: Bharatiya Janata Party
- Parent: Gangadhar Jana (father)
- Education: B.Com, Bangabasi College, University of Calcutta
- Occupation: Politician, Social worker, Businessman

Dipankar Jana is an Indian politician, businessman, and social worker from West Bengal. He became a Member of the Legislative Assembly (MLA) from the Kakdwip Assembly Constituency in 2026. He is associated with the Bharatiya Janata Party (BJP) and is known for his social work and public service in the Sundarban region. He is currently serving as the Minister of State of West Bengal.

Before entering politics, Dipankar Jana was involved in business activities in the Sundarban region. Later, he entered active politics and joined the Bharatiya Janata Party in 2015.

He is the son of Gangadhar Jana, who served as the Panchayat Pradhan of Rishi Bankim Chandra Gram Panchayat in 1993.

== Early life and education ==
Dipankar Jana was born in West Bengal. He completed his secondary and higher secondary education from Gobindarampur Aswini Kumar High School. He later completed his Bachelor of Commerce (B.Com) degree from Bangabasi College, affiliated with the University of Calcutta.

== Political career ==
Dipankar Jana joined the Bharatiya Janata Party in 2015. Between 2019 and 2021, he served as the President of Sundarban Organizational District BJP. Later, he became the Convener of South 24 Parganas Bibhag.

He contested the 2021 West Bengal Legislative Assembly election from Kakdwip but was unsuccessful.

In the 2026 West Bengal Legislative Assembly election, he was elected as MLA from Kakdwip, defeating Manturam Pakhira by 4,760 votes.
