= Department of Sundarban Affairs (West Bengal) =

Ministerial office jurisdicted by the Government of West Bengal

Department overview
- Formed: 1992
- Jurisdiction: Government of West Bengal
- Headquarters: Mayukh Bhawan (Top Floor), Salt Lake, Kolkata-700091
- Minister responsible: Dipankar Jana, Minister in Charge, Sundarban Affairs & Development
- Department executives: Kanwaljit Singh Cheema, IAS, Principal Secretary; Prasun Parimal Ghosh, Chief Engineer
- Website: Official Website

Department of Sundarban Affairs is a ministerial office jurisdicted by the Government of West Bengal. It is mainly used for promoting social, economic and cultural advancement of people residing in the Sundarban areas of the districts of North & South 24 Parganas.

== Activities ==
In terms of Rules of Business framed under Article 166(3) of the Constitution of India, this department performs the following functions of the Government:

- Promotion of socio - economic and Cultural Advancement of people residing in the Sundarban areas of the District of North 24 Parganas and South 24 Parganas
- Financing, regulation and inspection of bodies established for the purpose to be made.
- All matters in connection with or in relation to the Constitution of India and functioning of the Sundarban Development Board.
- Co-ordination of development schemes and projects such as:

i) Livelihoods:--> Agriculture, Pisciculture, Forestry;
ii) Water supply and sanitation;
iii) Disaster risk management and erosion control;
iv) Energy;
v) Transportation;
vi) Education;
vii) Awareness creation etc in the Sundarban areas of the District of North and South 24 Parganas.
