= Kaliaganj Assembly constituency =

Kaliaganj (SC)
- Constituency No. 34 for the West Bengal Legislative Assembly
- Interactive Map Outlining Kaliaganj Assembly Constituency

Constituency details
- Country: India
- Region: East India
- State: West Bengal
- District: Uttar Dinajpur
- Lok Sabha constituency: Raiganj
- Established: 1962
- Total electors: 268,580
- Reservation: SC

Member of Legislative Assembly
- 18th West Bengal Legislative Assembly
- Incumbent Utpal Brahmacharo
- Party: Bharatiya Janata Party
- Elected year: 2026

Kaliaganj (SC) Assembly constituency is an assembly constituency in Uttar Dinajpur district in the Indian state of West Bengal. It is reserved for scheduled castes.

== Overview ==
As per orders of the Delimitation Commission, No. 34 Kaliaganj Assembly constituency (SC) covers Kaliaganj municipality, Kaliaganj community development block and Barua and Birghai gram panchayats of Raiganj community development block.

Kaliaganj Assembly constituency is part of No. 5 Raiganj (Lok Sabha constituency). It was earlier part of Balurghat (Lok Sabha constituency).

== Members of the Legislative Assembly ==
Election Year	MLA	Party
1962	Syama Prasad Barman	Indian National Congress
1967	Syama Prasad Barman	Indian National Congress
1969	Syama Prasad Barman	Indian National Congress
1971	Debendra Nath Roy	Indian National Congress
1972	Debendra Nath Roy	Indian National Congress
1977	Naba Kumar Roy	Indian National Congress
1982	Naba Kumar Roy	Indian National Congress
1987	Ramani Kanti Debsarma	Communist Party of India (Marxist)
1991	Ramani Kanti Debsarma	Communist Party of India (Marxist)
1996	Pramatha Nath Ray	Indian National Congress
2001	Pramatha Nath Ray	Indian National Congress
2006	Nani Gopal Roy	Communist Party of India (Marxist)
2011	Pramatha Nath Ray	Indian National Congress
2016	Pramatha Nath Ray	Indian National Congress
**2019**	Tapan Deb Singha	All India Trinamool Congress
2021	Soumen Roy	Bharatiya Janata Party
2026	Utpal Brahmacharo	Bharatiya Janata Party

Bolded year= Bye Election

== Election results ==
=== 2026 ===
In the 2026 West Bengal Legislative Assembly election, Utpal Brahmacharo of BJP defeated his nearest rival Nitai Baishya of TMC by 76425 votes.

2026 West Bengal Legislative Assembly election: Kaliaganj (SC)
Party	Candidate	Votes	%	±%
**BJP**	**Utpal Brahmacharo**	**158,349**	**61.32**	**▲12.61**
AITC	Nitai Baishya	81,924	31.73	▼7.88
CPI(M)	Hiru Roy Sarkar	5,779	2.24	
INC	Giridhari Pramanik	4,747	1.84	▼5.16
NOTA	None of the above	2,993	1.16	▼0.09
Majority		76,425	29.59	▲20.49
Turnout		258,225	96.14	▲11.3
BJP **hold**		Swing	10.24	

=== 2021 ===
2021 West Bengal Legislative Assembly election: Kaliaganj
Party	Candidate	Votes	%	±%
**BJP**	**Soumen Roy**	**116,768**	**48.71**	
AITC	Tapan Deb Singha	94,948	39.61	
INC	Pravash Sarkar	16,770	7.0	
Independent	Sudhir Sarkar	4,004	1.67	
NOTA	None of the above	3,007	1.25	
Majority		21,820	9.1	
Turnout		239,726	84.84	
BJP **hold**		Swing		

=== 2021 ===
In the 2021 election, Soumen Roy of BJP defeated his nearest rival Tapan Deb Singha of Trinamool Congress. Soumen Roy himself later defected to Trinamool Congress. He later rejoined the BJP.

2021 West Bengal Legislative Assembly election: Kaliaganj
Party	Candidate	Votes	%	±%
**BJP**	**Soumen Roy**	**116,768**	**48.71**	**+5.17**
AITC	Tapan Deb Singha	94,948	39.61	−5.04
INC	Pravash Sarkar	16,770	7.00	−1.64
Independent	Sudhir Sarkar	4,004	1.67	
NOTA	None of the above	3,007	1.25	+0.21
SUCI(C)	Gopal Chunary	1,073	0.45	
Independent	Shyama Sarkar	781	0.33	
Independent	Dilip Chandra Ray	552	0.23	
Independent	Alen Sarkar	408	0.17	
AMB	Namala Kanta Sarkar	387	0.16	
Turnout		239,726	88.80	+7.76
BJP **gain** from AITC		Swing		

==== 2019 bypoll ====
A bye-poll was necessitated due to the death of the incumbent MLA, Pramatha Nath Ray. In this election, Tapan Deb Singha of Trinamool Congress defeated his nearest rival Kamal Chandra Sarkar of BJP.

2019 West Bengal state assembly bye- elections: Kaliaganj
Party	Candidate	Votes	%	±%
**AITC**	**Tapan Deb Singha**	**97,428**	**44.65**	**+13.88**
BJP	Kamal Chandra Sarkar	95,014	43.54	+30.84
INC	Dhitashri Roy	18,857	8.64	−43.94
NOTA	None of the above	2,273	1.04	−0.61
Independent	Darbindu Sarkar	1,868	0.86	
SP	Pradip Kumar Ray	1,860	0.85	
CPI(ML)L	Jagadish Rajbhar	900	0.41	−0.20
Turnout		218,200	81.04	−4.61
AITC **gain** from INC		Swing		

=== 2016 ===
In the 2016 election, Pramatha Nath Ray of Indian National Congress defeated his nearest rival Basanta Roy of Trinamool Congress.

2016 West Bengal Legislative Assembly election: Kaliaganj
Party	Candidate	Votes	%	±%
**INC**	**Pramatha Nath Ray**	**112,868**	**52.58**	**+4.99**
AITC	Basanta Roy	66,266	30.87	
BJP	Rupak Roy	27,252	12.70	+9.02
NOTA	None of the above	3,533	1.65	
BSP	Basudeb Debsharma	1,850	0.86	+0.04
Samajwadi Jan Parishad	Jiten Roy Sinha	1,560	0.73	
CPI(ML)L	Jagadish Rajbhar	1,313	0.61	+0.11
Turnout		214,642	85.65	−2.30
INC **hold**		Swing		

=== 2011 ===
In the 2011 election, Pramatha Nath Ray of Indian National Congress defeated his nearest rival Nani Gopal Roy of CPI(M).

2011 West Bengal Legislative Assembly election: Kaliaganj
Party	Candidate	Votes	%	±%
**INC**	**Pramatha Nath Ray**	**84,873**	**47.59**	**−2.51**
CPI(M)	Nani Gopal Roy	77,583	43.51	−1.46
BJP	Bhupati Roy	6,563	3.68	
Independent	Hriday Chandra Sarkar	3,302	1.85	
BSP	Basudeb Debsharma	1,471	0.82	
Independent	Himangshu Roy	1,251		
CPI(ML)L	Jagadish Rajbhar	894	0.5	
Independent	Sunil Barman	817		
Independent	Kanu Roy	684		
Independent	Sushila Barman	486		
Independent	Rabindranath Barman	400		
Turnout		178,324	87.95	
INC **gain** from CPI(M)		Swing	-1.15	

.# Swing calculated on Congress+Trinamool Congress vote percentages taken together in 2006.

=== 2006 ===
In the 2006 state assembly elections, Nani Gopal Roy of CPI(M) won the Kaliaganj (SC) assembly seat defeating his nearest rival Pramatha Nath Ray of Congress. Contests in most years were multi cornered but only winners and runners are being mentioned. Pramathanath Ray of Congress defeated Ramani Kanta Debsarma of CPI(M) in 2001 and 1996. Ramani Kanta Debsarma of CPI(M) defeated Pramatha Nath Roy of Congress in 1991 and Naba Kumar Roy of Congress in 1987. Naba Kumar Roy of Congress defeated Nani Gopal Roy of CPI(M) in 1982 and 1977.

=== 1972 ===
Debendra Nath Roy of Congress won in 1972 and 1971. Syama Prasad Barman won the Kaliaganj seat in 1969, 1967 and 1962. Prior to that the Kaliaganj seat was not there. In 1957 and 1951 Raiganj was a joint seat. Hazi Badirudddin Ahmad and Syama Prasad Barman, both of Congress, won from Raiganj in 1957. Syama Prasad Barman and Gulam Hamidur Rahman, both of Congress, won from Raiganj in 1951.
