= Soumen Roy =

Indian politician

Member of the West Bengal Legislative Assembly
- In office 2 May 2021 – 5 May 2026
- Preceded by: Tapan Deb Singha
- Succeeded by: Utpal Brahmacharo
- Constituency: Kaliaganj

Personal details
- Party: Bharatiya Janata Party (2019-2021 & 2024-Present)
- Other political affiliations: All India Trinamool Congress (2021-2024)
- Education: B.A.
- Alma mater: Alipurduar College
- Profession: Teacher, Politician

Soumen Roy is an Indian politician from Bharatiya Janata Party. He is a former All India Trinamool Congress member. In May 2021, he was elected as a member of the West Bengal Legislative Assembly from Kaliaganj constituency. He defeated Tapan Deb Singha of All India Trinamool Congress by 94,948 votes in the 2021 West Bengal Assembly election. Although he won the 2021 assembly elections on a BJP ticket, he joined the Trinamool Congress within a few months of the election results. However, he returned to BJP on 28 February 2024 on the recommendation of BJP Rajya Sabha MP Anant Maharaj.
