= Manturam Pakhira =

Indian politician

Minister of State (Independent charge) for Sundarban Affairs, Government of West Bengal
- In office November 2012 – May 2016
- Preceded by: Shyamal Mondal
- Constituency: Kakdwip

Member of West Bengal Legislative Assembly
- In office 2011–2026
- Preceded by: Ashok Giri
- Succeeded by: Dipankar Jana
- Constituency: Kakdwip
- In office 2001–2006
- Preceded by: Ashok Giri
- Succeeded by: Ashok Giri
- Constituency: Kakdwip

Personal details
- Born: 1963 (age 62–63)
- Party: Trinamool Congress

Manturam Pakhira is a Trinamool Congress politician and a former minister of Sundarbans Affairs in the Government of West Bengal. He is son of Kalipada Pakhira, he is a social worker.

On 30 September 2020, he was diagnosed with COVID-19 and thereafter hospitalized in ID & BG Hospital in Kolkata.

== Politics ==
Pakhira was first elected from Kakdwip (Vidhan Sabha constituency) in South 24 Parganas in 2001, and again elected in 2011.

He was inducted as a Minister of State in charge of Sunderbans Development in November 2012.

He served as MLA of Kakdwip till 2026. In the 2026 West Bengal Legislative Assembly election, he was defeated by Dipankar Jana by 4,760 votes.
