= Bagdaha, Nepal =

Bagdaha बागदह
- Village development committee
- Location in Nepal
- Coordinates: 26°51′0″N 85°27′0″E
- Country: Nepal
- Province: Province No. 2
- District: Sarlahi District

Population (1991)
  - Total: 4,124
- Time zone: UTC+5:45 (Nepal Time)

Bagdaha is a village development committee in Sarlahi District in Province No. 2 of south-eastern Nepal. At the time of the 1991 Nepal census it had a population of 4124 people living in 775 individual households.
