= Kolkata–Radhikapur Express =

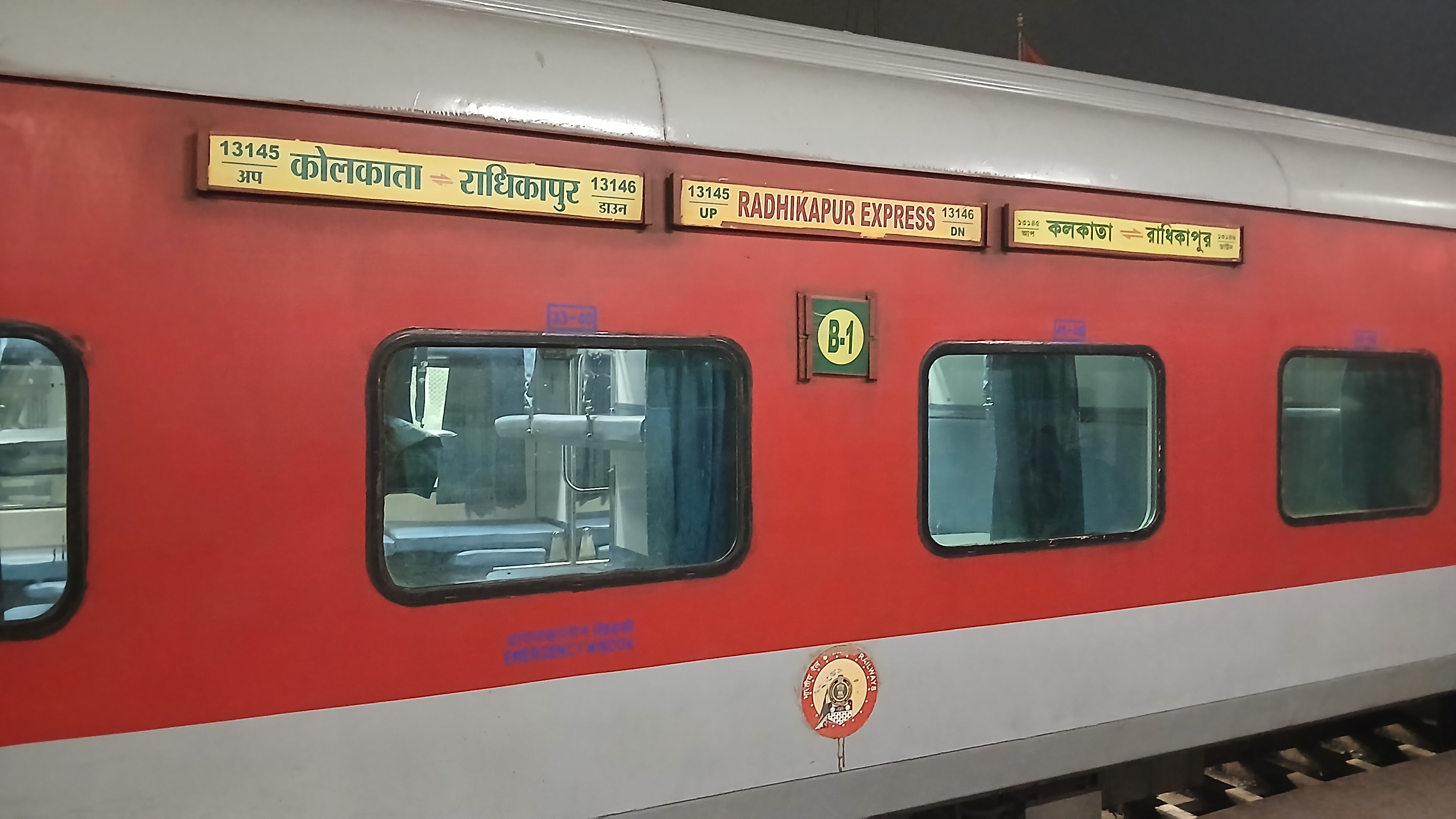
- Radhikapur Express in Kolkata station.

Overview
- Service type: Express
- First service: 27 December 2006
- Current operator: Eastern Railway zone

Route
- Termini: Kolkata (KOAA); Radhikapur (RDP)
- Stops: 18
- Distance travelled: 480 km (298 mi)
- Average journey time: 11h 20m
- Service frequency: daily
- Train number: 13145/13146

On-board services
- Classes: AC I Tier, AC II Tier, AC III Tier, AC III Tier economy, Sleeper coaches, General Unreserved
- Seating arrangements: No
- Sleeping arrangements: Yes
- Catering facilities: On-board catering E-catering
- Observation facilities: LHB coach
- Entertainment facilities: No
- Baggage facilities: No
- Other facilities: Below the seats

Technical
- Rolling stock: 2
- Track gauge: 1,676 mm (5 ft 6 in)
- Electrification: No
- Operating speed: 46 km/h (29 mph), including halts

The Kolkata–Radhikapur Express is an Express train belonging to Eastern Railway zone that runs between Kolkata (KOAA) and Radhikapur (RDP) in India. It is currently being operated with 13145/13146 train numbers on a daily basis.

== Service ==
13145/Kolkata–Radhikapur Express: The 13145 Up has an average speed of 42 km/h and covers 480 km in 10h 35m. It departs from Kolkata at 20:40 and arrives at Radhikapur at 7:15 after completing 20 halts.

13146/Radhikapur–Kolkata Express: The 13146 Down has an average speed of 41 km/h and covers 48 kilometres (30 mi) in 9 hours and 35 minutes. It departs from Radhikapur at 21:00 and arrives at Kolkata at 6:35 after completing 20 halts.

== Route and halts ==
The important halts of the train are:

- Kolkata
- Naihati Junction
- Bandel Junction
- Nabadwip Dham
- Katwa Junction
- Salar
- Khagraghat Road
- Azimganj Junction
- Jangipur Road
- New Farakka Junction
- Malda Town
- Harischandrapur
- Barsoi Junction
- Raiganj
- Kaliaganj
- Radhikapur

== Coach composition ==
The train has standard LHB rakes with maximum speed of 110 km/h. The train consists of 20 coaches:

- 1 composite AC I Tier and AC II Tier
- 1 AC II Tier
- 3 AC III Tier
- 4 AC III Tier economy
- 7 Sleeper coaches
- 4 General
- 2 Seating cum Luggage Rake

== Traction ==
Both trains are hauled by a -based WAP 4 locomotive from Kolkata to Azimganj Jn. Then A diesel Loco from Azimganj to Radhikapur and vice versa.

== See also ==
- Kolkata railway station
- Radhikapur railway station
- Seemanchal Link Express
- Radhikapur–Siliguri DEMU
