= Kakdwip Assembly constituency =

West Bengal Legislative Assembly Constituency

Kakdwip
- Constituency No. 131 for the West Bengal Legislative Assembly
- Interactive Map Outlining Kakdwip Assembly Constituency

Constituency details
- Country: India
- Region: East India
- State: West Bengal
- District: South 24 Parganas
- Lok Sabha constituency: Mathurapur
- Established: 1957
- Total electors: 247,649
- Reservation: None

Member of Legislative Assembly
- 18th West Bengal Legislative Assembly
- Incumbent Dipankar Jana
- Party: BJP
- Alliance: NDA
- Elected year: 2026

Kakdwip Assembly constituency is a Legislative Assembly constituency of South 24 Parganas district in the Indian State of West Bengal.

== Overview ==
As per order of the Delimitation Commission in respect of the Delimitation of constituencies in the West Bengal, Kakdwip Assembly constituency is composed of the following:

- Kakdwip community development block
- Budhakhali and Narayanpur gram panchayats of Namkhana community development block

Kakdwip Assembly constituency is a part of No. 20 Mathurapur Lok Sabha constituency.

== Members of the Legislative Assembly ==
Year	Name	Party
1957	Maya Banerjee	Indian National Congress
1962	Maya Banerjee	Indian National Congress
1967	Hansadhwaj Dhara	Indian National Congress
1969	Hansadhwaj Dhara	Indian National Congress
1971	Hrishikesh Maity	Communist Party of India (Marxist)
1972	Basudeb Sautya	Indian National Congress
1977	Hrishikesh Maity	Communist Party of India (Marxist)
1982	Hrishikesh Maity	Communist Party of India (Marxist)
1987	Hrishikesh Maity	Communist Party of India (Marxist)
1991	Hrishikesh Maity	Communist Party of India (Marxist)
1996	Ashok Giri	Communist Party of India (Marxist)
2001	Manturam Pakhira	Trinamool Congress
2006	Ashok Giri	Communist Party of India (Marxist)
2011	Manturam Pakhira	Trinamool Congress
2016	Manturam Pakhira	Trinamool Congress
2021	Manturam Pakhira	Trinamool Congress
2026	Dipankar Jana	Bharatiya Janata Party

== Election results ==
Vote share of Winning candidates
2026	47.29%
2021	52.14%
2016	53.70%
2011	51.46%
2006	49.44%
2001	47.93%
1996	49.42%
1991	51.45%
1987	55.31%
1982	56.58%
1977	52.72%
1972	59.49%
1971	44.66%
1969	49.76%
1967	73.55%
1962	34.38%
1957	64.20%

=== 2026 ===
2026 West Bengal Legislative Assembly election: Kakdwip
Party	Candidate	Votes	%	±%
BJP	Dipankar Jana	109,373	47.29	▲6.67
AITC	Manturam Pakhira	104,613	45.23	▼6.91
CPI(M)	Narayan Das	12,129	5.24	
NOTA	None of the above	1,165	0.5	▲0.03
Majority		4,760	2.06	▼9.46
Turnout		231,303	95.62	▲7.01
BJP gain from AITC		Swing		

=== 2021 ===
2021 West Bengal Legislative Assembly election: Kakdwip
Party	Candidate	Votes	%	±%
AITC	Manturam Pakhira	114,493	52.14	▼1.56
BJP	Dipankar Jana	89,191	40.62	▲37.24
INC	Indranil Rout	12,234	5.57	▼35.36
NOTA	None of the above	1,023	0.47	
Majority		25,302	11.52	
Turnout		219,597	88.61	
AITC hold		Swing		

=== 2016 ===
2016 West Bengal Legislative Assembly election: Kakdwip
Party	Candidate	Votes	%	±%
AITC	Manturam Pakhira	104,750	53.70	▲2.24
INC	Rafik Uddin Molla	79,831	40.93	New entry
BJP	Koushik Das	6,600	3.38	▲1.35
SUCI(C)	Amiya Sasmal	1,280	0.66	New entry
NOTA	None of the above	1,130	0.58	New entry
BSP	Parbati Bhunia	960	0.49	New entry
LJP	Ahamadulla Sheikh	502	0.26	New entry
Majority		24,919	12.77	▲6.38
Turnout		1,95,053	89.85	▼1.16
AITC hold		Swing		

=== 2011 ===
2011 West Bengal Legislative Assembly election: Kakdwip
Party	Candidate	Votes	%	±%
AITC	Manturam Pakhira	84,483	51.46	
CPI(M)	Milan Bhattacharya	73,980	45.07	
BJP	Nirmal Kumar Das	3,329	2.03	
PDCI	Kazi Nasiruddin Baidya	1,225	0.75	
Independent	Himanshu Shekhar Patra	1,142	0.70	
Majority		10,503	6.39	
Turnout		1,64,159	91.01	
AITC gain from CPI(M)		Swing		

=== 2006 ===
2006 West Bengal Legislative Assembly election: Kakdwip
Party	Candidate	Votes	%	±%
CPI(M)	Ashok Giri	65,749	49.44	
AITC	Manturam Pakhira	57,333	43.11	
INC	Santosh Kumar Jana	7,914	5.95	
IND	Amiya Sasmal	2,003	1.51	
Majority		8,416	6.33	
Turnout		132,999		
Swing to CPI(M) from AITC		Swing		

=== 2001 ===
2001 West Bengal Legislative Assembly election: Kakdwip
Party	Candidate	Votes	%	±%
AITC	Manturam Pakhira	58,872	47.93	
CPI(M)	Ashok Giri	58,367	47.52	
BJP	Debabrata Bhowmik	2,864	2.33	
IND	Bhagirath Bag	1,075	0.88	
IND	Amiya Sasmal	834	0.68	
NCP	Koustouv Kanti Rout	809	0.66	
Majority		505	0.41	
Turnout		122,856	82.24	
Swing to AITC from CPI(M)		Swing		

=== 1996 ===
1996 West Bengal Legislative Assembly election: Kakdwip
Party	Candidate	Votes	%	±%
CPI(M)	Ashok Giri	58,362	49.42	
INC	Mantu Ram Pakhira	56,130	47.53	
BJP	Satya Maity	2,534	2.15	
IND	Amiya Sasmal	302	0.26	
IND	Chitta Ranjan Sahu	256	0.22	
CPI(ML)L	Santi Das	217	0.18	
IND	Swadesh Maity	159	0.13	
IND	Haradhan Bera	130	0.11	
Majority		2,232	1.89	
Turnout		119,550	87.05	
CPI(M) hold		Swing		

=== 1991 ===
1991 West Bengal Legislative Assembly election: Kakdwip
Party	Candidate	Votes	%	±%
CPI(M)	Hrishikesh Maity	49,615	51.45	
INC	Gouri Sankar Bhattacharjee	42,367	43.93	
BJP	Gobardhan Dingal	4,051	4.20	
IND	Amiya Kanti Sasmal	408	0.42	
Majority		7,248	7.52	
Turnout		98,076	83.05	
CPI(M) hold		Swing		

=== 1987 ===
1987 West Bengal Legislative Assembly election: Kakdwip
Party	Candidate	Votes	%	±%
CPI(M)	Hrishikesh Maity	45,554	55.31	
INC	Gourisankar Bhattacharjee	35,741	43.40	
IND	Rabindra Nath Roy	667	0.81	
IND	Saktipada Pramanik	392	0.48	
Majority		9,813	11.91	
Turnout		83,452	82.20	
CPI(M) hold		Swing		

=== 1982 ===
1982 West Bengal Legislative Assembly election: Kakdwip
Party	Candidate	Votes	%	±%
CPI(M)	Hrishikesh Maity	41,403	56.58	
INC	Basudev Sautya	31,156	42.58	
IND	Sudhansu Shekhar Kar	611	0.84	
Majority		10,247	14.00	
Turnout		74,583	85.31	
CPI(M) hold		Swing		

=== 1977 ===
1977 West Bengal Legislative Assembly election: Kakdwip
Party	Candidate	Votes	%	±%
CPI(M)	Hrishikesh Maity	26,949	52.72	
INC	Basudeb Sautya	12,362	24.18	
JP	Bishnupada Pramanik	11,331	22.17	
IND	Satyaranjan Maity	351	0.69	
IND	Kalipada Patra	124	0.24	
Majority		14,587	28.54	
Turnout		51,817	63.18	
Swing to CPI(M) from INC		Swing		

=== 1972 ===
1972 West Bengal Legislative Assembly election: Kakdwip
Party	Candidate	Votes	%	±%
INC	Basudeb Sautya	36,812	59.49	
CPI(M)	Hrishikesh Maity	25,067	40.51	
Majority		11,745	18.98	
Turnout		63,126	71.69	
Swing to INC from CPI(M)		Swing		

=== 1971 ===
1971 West Bengal Legislative Assembly election: Kakdwip
Party	Candidate	Votes	%	±%
CPI(M)	Hrishikesh Maity	27,775	44.66	
INC(O)	Hanasdwaj Dhara	11,522	18.53	
INC	Badunb Bautya	9,298	14.95	
Bangla Congress	Ashok Kumar Samanta	7,174	11.53	
CPI	Khagen Roy Chowdhury	6,427	10.33	
Majority		16,253	26.13	
Turnout		64,293	76.26	
Swing to CPI(M) from INC		Swing		

=== 1969 ===
1969 West Bengal Legislative Assembly election: Kakdwip
Party	Candidate	Votes	%	±%
INC	Hansadhwaj Dhara	30,114	49.76	
CPI(M)	Harishikesh Maity	26,848	44.37	
LKD	Anadi Kumar Bera	2,296	3.79	
NDF	Mamud Ali Molla	1,255	2.07	
Majority		3,266	5.39	
Turnout		61,790	78.34	
INC hold		Swing		

=== 1967 ===
1967 West Bengal Legislative Assembly election: Kakdwip
Party	Candidate	Votes	%	±%
INC	H. Dhara	45,031	73.55	
CPI(M)	H. Maity	14,269	23.31	
ABJS	S. B. Mondal	1,453	2.37	
IND	C. C. Moira	474	0.77	
Majority		30,762	50.24	
Turnout		62,851	80.53	
INC hold		Swing		

=== 1962 ===
1962 West Bengal Legislative Assembly election: Kakdwip
Party	Candidate	Votes	%	±%
INC	Maya Banerjee	20,778	34.38	
IND	Gobardhan Dingal	16,918	27.99	
CPI	Hrishihesh Maity	13,965	23.10	
PSP	Haripada Baguli	8,781	14.53	
Majority		3,860	6.39	
Turnout		63,344	74.17	
INC hold		Swing		

=== 1957 ===
1957 West Bengal Legislative Assembly election: Kakdwip
Party	Candidate	Votes	%	±%
INC	Maya Banerji	28,764	64.20	
PSP	Haripada Baguli	16,043	35.80	
Majority		12,721	28.40	
Turnout		44,807	63.58	
INC win (new seat)				
