= Bagda =

Coordinates: 22°58′54″N 69°47′19″E

Bagda is a village near Bhadresar in Kachchh district, Gujarat, India.

== Places of interest ==
There are some memorial stones, Paliyas, the earliest dated 1648 (Samvat 1705) dedicated to one Khatri Parmanand. Halfway between Bagda and nearby village Vaghura is a small temple of Phuleshvar Mahadev, eleven feet by twelve, with writing which seems to show that it was rebuilt in 1837 (Samvat 1894) by Swami Surajgar. Weather-worn images of Parvati, Hanuman, and the Nandi lie about, and there is a ruined sati memorial stone dated 1630 (Samvat 1687). The stepwell between Bagda and Vaghura was, in 1853 (Samvat 1910), rebuilt by Gosai Hiragar Jivangar.
