= Raiganj railway station =

Railway station in West Bengal

Raiganj
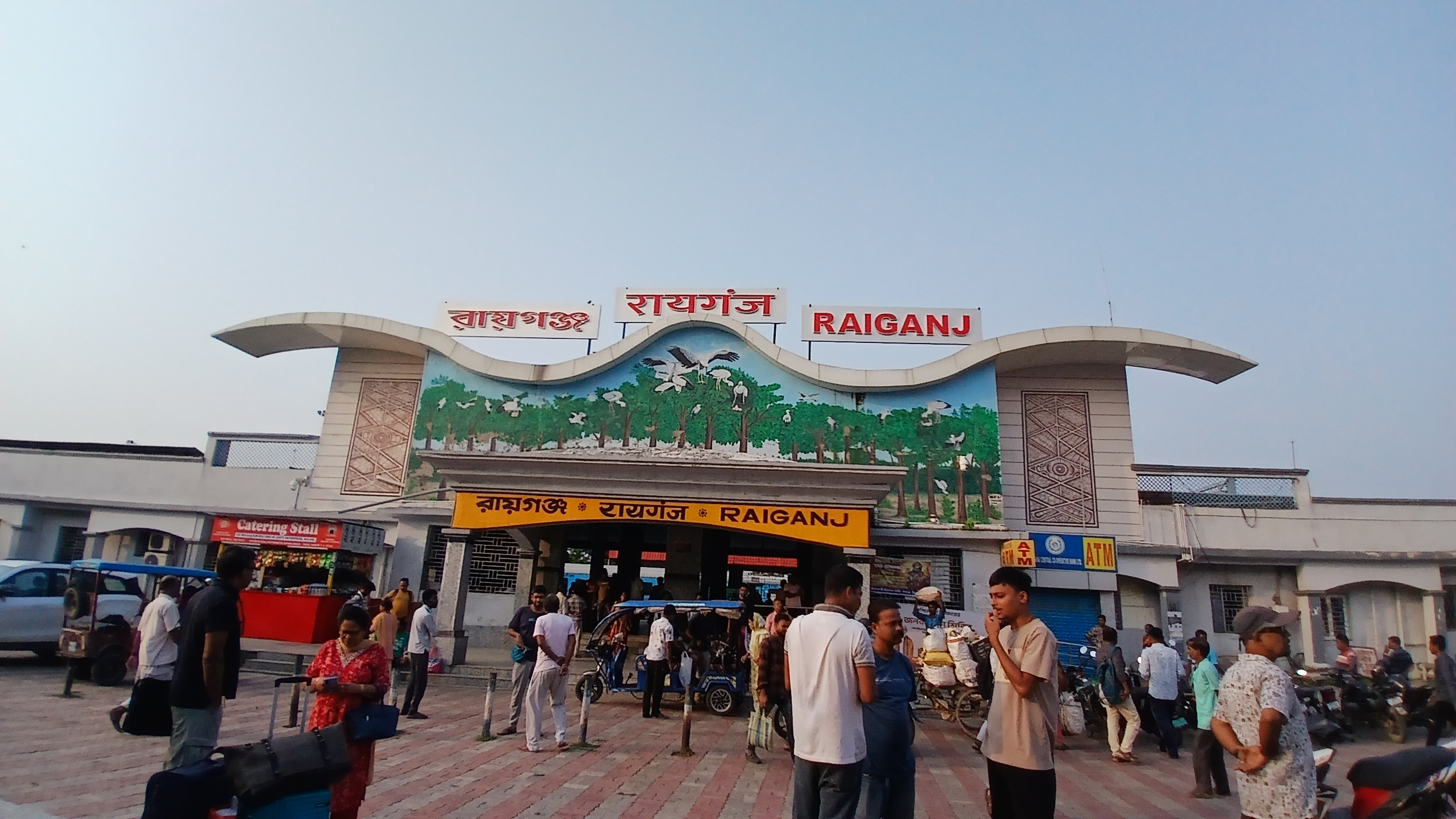

General information
- Location: State Highway 10A, Raiganj, West Bengal; India
- Coordinates: 25.6187°N 88.1285°E
- Elevation: 37 metres (121 ft)
- System: Indian Railways station
- Owner: Indian Railways
- Operator: Northeast Frontier Railway
- Line: Barsoi–Radhikapur branch line
- Platforms: 2
- Tracks: 3

Construction
- Structure type: Standard on ground
- Parking: Available

Other information
- Station code: RGJ
- Zone(s): Northeast Frontier Railway
- Division(s): Katihar

History
- Opened: 1889
- Former names: Assam Behar State Railway
Location
- Location within West Bengal Location within India

Raiganj railway station serves Raiganj city in Uttar Dinajpur district in the Indian state of West Bengal.

== History ==
Katihar was connected to Parbatipur, now in Bangladesh, in 1889, by Assam Behar State Railway.

With the partition of India, links with East Pakistan were lost. The Barsoi–Radhikapur sector became a branch line. In the early 1960s, when Farakka Barrage was being constructed, a more radical change was made. Indian Railways created a new broad-gauge rail link from Calcutta.

The 2,240 m (7,350 ft)-long Farakka Barrage carries a rail-cum-road bridge across the Ganges. The rail bridge was opened in 1971, linking the Barharwa–Azimganj–Katwa loop to Mala Town, New Jalpaiguri and other railway stations in North Bengal.

== List of available trains ==
Raiganj railway station is on the Barsoi–Radhikapur branch line. One express train Radhikapur Express & Kulik Express are available for reaching Kolkata. Delhi Bound Daily link express also available from Raiganj which service is postponed after COVID-19 lockdown. Besides these couple of Katihar bound 3 local passenger trains and a Siliguri-bound DMU passenger and Radhikapur–Telta DMU can also be availed. Present C.M. of West Bengal Mamata Banerjee during her reign as a railways minister announced couple of railways projects for Raiganj which will definitely boost the communication.

- Raiganj–Dalkhola line (43.43 km)
- Raiganj–Itahar–Gazole line
- Itahar–Buniadpur Rail line
- Itahar–Chachal–Samsi line

In 1972 and 1983 Gajole–Gunjoria Via Raiganj Rail project which can decrease the present distance between Kolkata and Siliguri had also sanctioned, but not implemented till now for political issues.

== Future upgrades ==
Raiganj is pretty backward in terms of railway communication. The station is situated on Barsoi–Radhikapur branch line and only a handful of trains pass. But, the railway ministry has sanctioned couple of projects which will convert Raiganj railway station to a Railway Junction. The projects when completed will provide direct links to Malda Town railway station and also to Dalkhola railway station and thus will greatly boost the communication. The projects are in initial stages and only 30% of work has been completed.

== Amenities ==
Raiganj railway station has the following amenities:

- Computerized reservation system
- Waiting room
- Retering room
- Book stall
- Meal stalls

=== Platforms ===
There are a total of 2 platforms and 3 tracks. The platforms are connected by foot overbridge.

=== Station layout ===
G	Street level	Exit/Entrance & ticket counter
P1	FOB, Side platform, No-1 doors will open on the left/right
P1	Track 1
P1	Track 2
P1	Track 3
P1	FOB, Island platform, No- 2 doors will open on the left/right

== Gallery ==
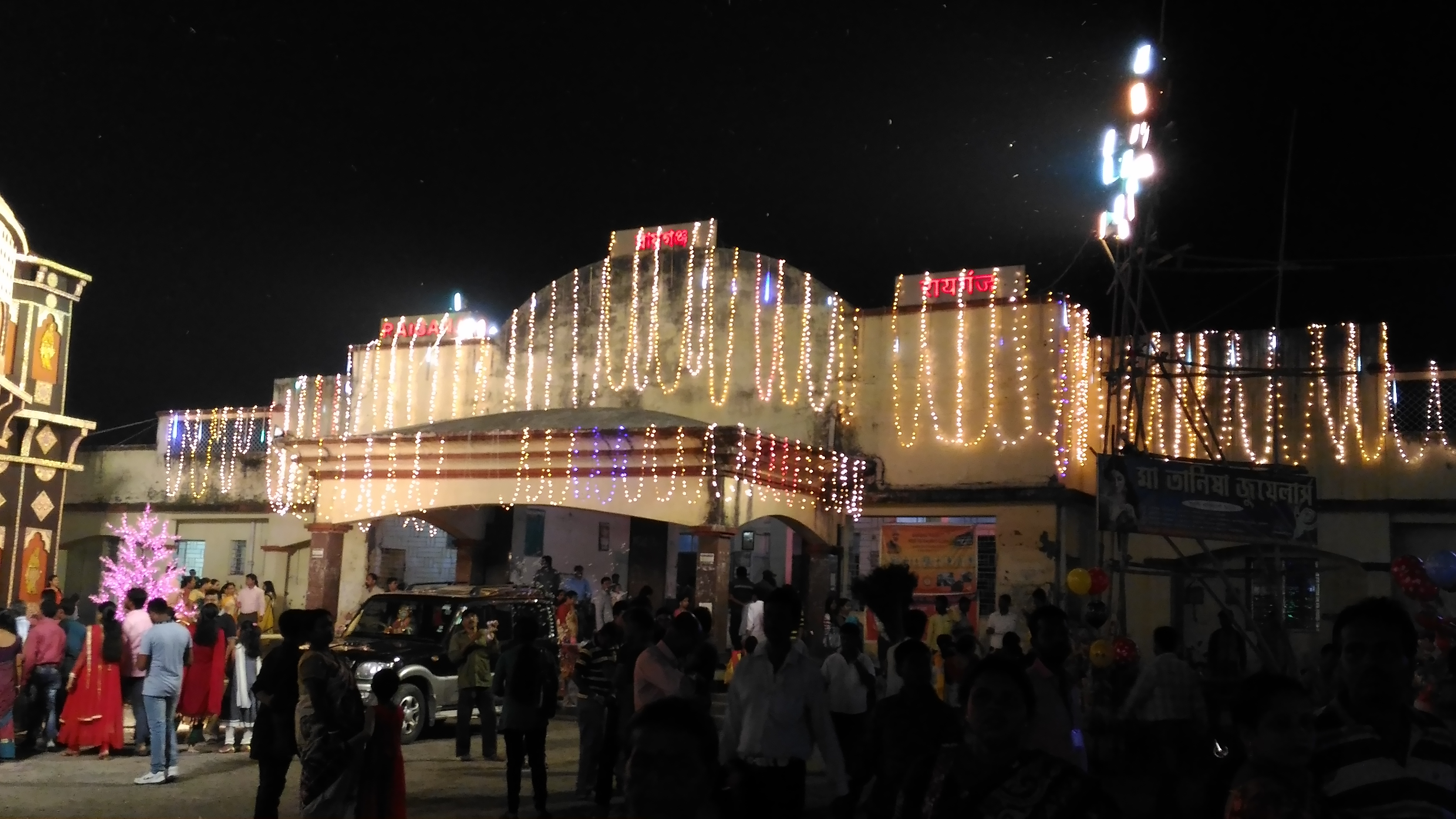
Raiganj Station during diwali

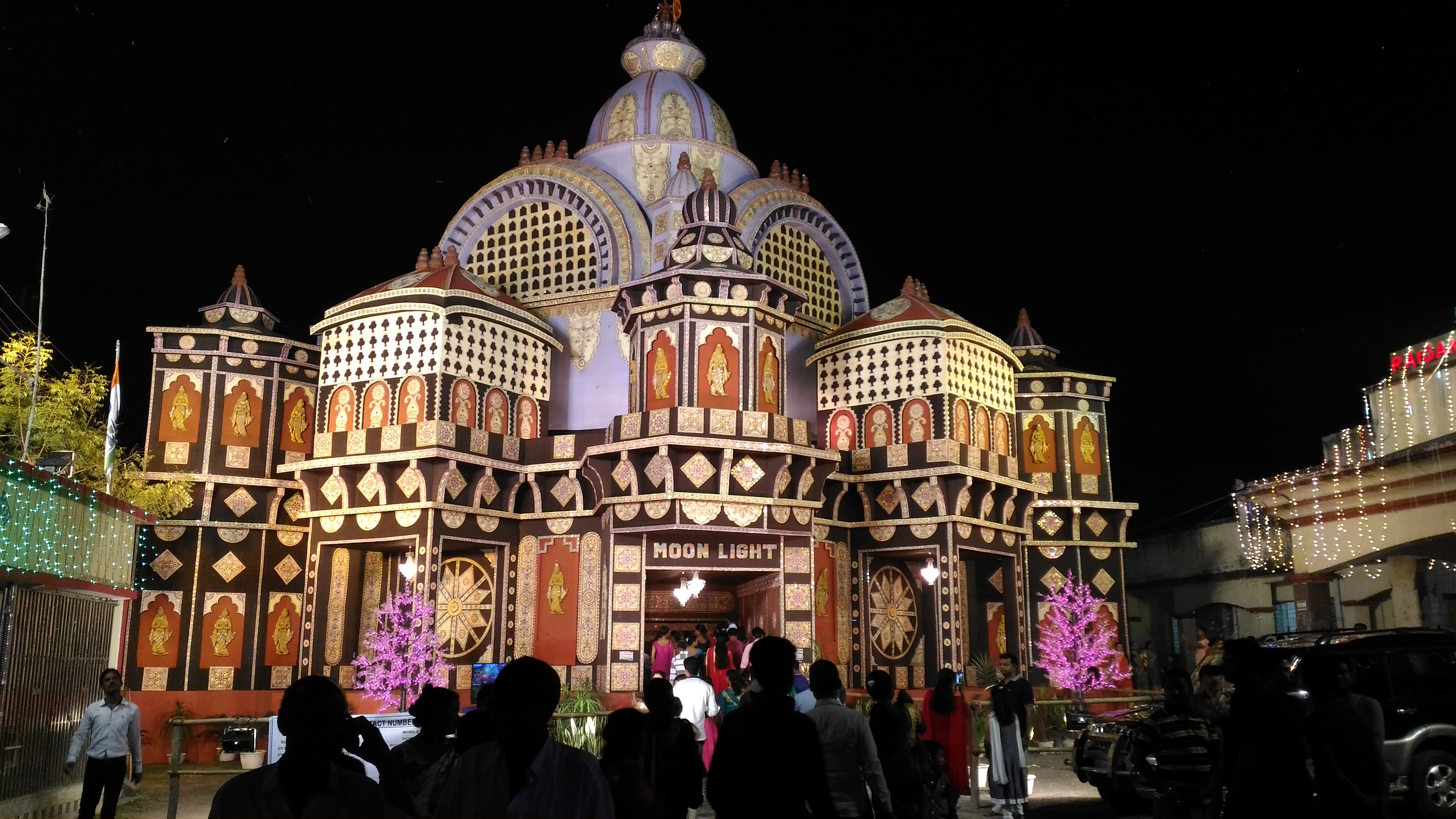
Kali Puja at the station premises

== See also ==
- Barsoi Junction railway station
- Indian Railways
- Malda Town railway station
- Barsoi–Radhikapur branch line
- Radhikapur railway station
- List of railway stations in India

Preceding station	Indian Railways	Following station
Jhitkia towards ?	Northeast Frontier Railway zone Barsoi–Parbatipur branch line	Bamangram towards ?
