= Radhikapur railway station =

Railway Station in West Bengal, India

Radhikapur Railway Station
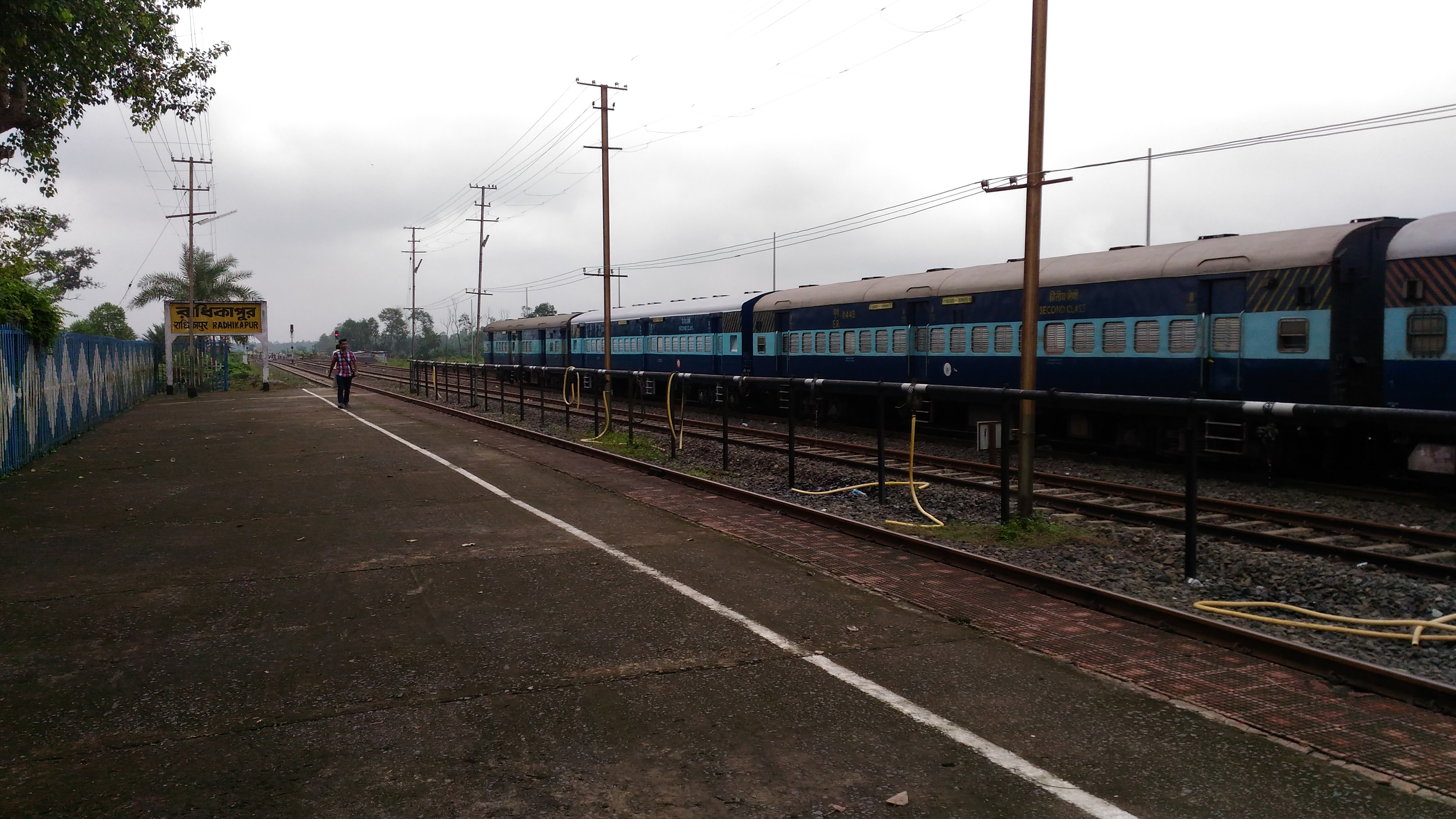

General information
- Location: State Highway 10A, Radikapur, Distt: Uttar Dinajpur, West Bengal; India
- Coordinates: 25.642778°N 88.446944°E
- Elevation: 37 metres (121 ft)
- System: Express train & passenger train station
- Owner: Indian Railways
- Operator: Northeast Frontier Railway
- Line: Barsoi–Radhikapur branch line
- Platforms: 2

Construction
- Structure type: Standard on ground
- Parking: Available

Other information
- Status: Functioning
- Station code: RDP
- Division(s): Katihar

History
- Opened: 1879; 147 years ago
- Former names: Assam–Bengal State Railway
Location
- Location within West Bengal Location within India

Radhikapur railway station serves Radhikapur in the Uttar Dinajpur district, West Bengal, India. It is an active rail transit system on the Bangladesh–India border. It is an India–Bangladesh land border checkpoint and has a land customs station for movement of goods. Both Indian and Bangladesh governments have been trying to increase connectivity through Radhikapur.

== History ==
Assam Behar State Railway extended the metre-gauge railway from Parbatipur, now in Bangladesh, to Katihar in 1889. In 1948–50, as a part of the Assam Rail Link project, the Fakiragram–Kishanganj sector was connected to the North Eastern Railway network at Barsoi. The railway lines in the area started being converted to 5 ft 6 in (1,676 mm) broad gauge from the early 1960s. The Barsoi–Radhikapur sector was converted to broad gauge in 2006. Recorded trade volume in FY 2018-19 was INR 21 crores. Freight train services resumed in Feb, 2025 after several months of disruption since 2024.

== Amenities ==
Radhikapur railway station has the following amenities:

- Computerized reservation system
- Waiting room
- Retiring room

=== Platforms ===
There are a total of 2 platforms and 3 tracks. The platforms are connected by foot overbridge.

=== Station layout ===
| G | Street level | Exit/Entrance & ticket counter |
| P1 | FOB, Side platform, No-1 doors will open on the left/right |
| P1 | Track 1 |
| P1 | Track 2 |
| P1 | Track 3 |
| P1 | FOB, Side platform, No- 2 doors will open on the left/right |

== Services ==
The following Train services are available from this station:

| Train No. | Train Name | Origin & Destination | Time of Departure (IST) | Time of Arrival (IST) | Running Days |
|---|---|---|---|---|---|
| 55707/08, 55727/28, 55729/30 | Radhikapur-Katihar Passenger | Radhikapur-Katihar | 4.45 AM, 10.10 AM, 6.10 PM | 10.20 PM, 9.30 AM, 5.25 PM | Daily |
| 13053/54 | Kulik Express | Radhikapur-Howrah | 5.45 AM | 6.45 PM | Daily |
| 75707/08 | Radhikapur-Siliguri DEMU | Radhikapur-Siliguri | 6.30 AM | 11.00 PM | Daily |
| 14011/12 | Radhikapur–Anand Vihar Terminal Express | Radhikapur-Anand Vihar Terminal (Delhi) | 11.00 AM | 7.10 AM | T |
| 75751/52 | Radhikapur-Telta DEMU | Radhikapur-Telta | 2.05 PM | 1.45 PM | Daily |
| 75705/06 | Radhikapur-Siliguri DEMU Intercity Express | Radhikapur-Siliguri | 5.30 PM | 10.50 AM | Daily |
| 13145/46 | Radhikapur-Kolkata Express | Radhikapur-Kolkata | 9.00 PM | 6.25 AM | Daily |

| Preceding station | Indian Railways | Following station |
|---|---|---|
| Dalimgaon towards ? | Northeast Frontier Railway zone Barsoi–Radhikapur branch line | Terminus |
