= Barsoi–Radhikapur branch line =

Railway line in India

Barsoi–Radhikapur Branch line

Overview
- Status: Operational
- Owner: Indian Railways
- Locale: West Bengal; Bihar
- Termini: Barsoi Junction; Radhikapur railway station
- Stations: 10

Service
- System: Indian Railways
- Operator(s): Northeast Frontier Railway

History
- Opened: 1889; 136 years ago (as Metre-gauge railway); 2006; 19 years ago (upgraded to Broad-gauge railway)

Technical
- Line length: 53.44 km (33 mi)
- Character: Single-track railway
- Track gauge: 5 ft 6 in (1,676 mm) broad gauge
- Electrification: Yes

The Barsoi–Radhikapur branch line links Howrah–New Jalpaiguri line on Barsoi Junction railway station from Radhikapur railway station on the Bangladesh–India border.

== History ==
Assam Behar State Railway extended the metre-gauge railway from Parbatipur, now in Bangladesh, to Katihar in 1889. With the partition of India in 1947, the Katihar–Radhikapur section remained in India and the Biral–Parbatipur section was placed in Pakistan (later Bangladesh).

== The railway line ==
When the broad-gauge railway line, instead of being placed at Dalkhola–Malda via Raiganj, was moved to Dalkhola–Barsoi–Malda this section, became only a branch line. This branch line starts at Barsoi railway station and ends at Radhikapur railway station where the Indo-Bangladesh border lies. The Barsoi–Radhikapur sector was converted to broad gauge in 2006. The corresponding station on the Bangladesh side is Biral in Dinajpur District. The transit facility in the Radhikapur–Birol sector has remained suspended since 1 April 2005.But now it has been converted to broad gauge and large goods train are travelling with stone boulders from Nepal to Bangladesh through India from March 2017 and it was officially operationalised and announced open in April 2017. The railway track on the Indian side has been converted to 5 ft 6 in (1,676 mm) broad gauge while that on the Bangladesh side has been made into Dual gauge.

There are 10 railway stations in this branch line. 7 of them are in Uttar Dinajpur district of West Bengal and the rest are in Katihar district of Bihar.

== Stations ==
Station code	Station name	Distance (km)
RDP	Radhikapur	0.0
DLX	Dalimgaon	6.2
KAJ	Kaliyaganj	12.1
BJY	Bangalbaree	21.9
BMGR	Bamangram	25.1
RGJ	Raiganj	32.2
JTK	Jhitkia	38.8
KAU	Kachna	42.8
DHNA	Dhachna	49.1
BOE	Barsoi Junction	53.4
