= 16th West Bengal Assembly =

Indian state legislature, 2016–2021

←	15th Assembly	17th Assembly	→

Overview
- Legislative body: West Bengal Legislative Assembly
- Term: 2016 – 2021
- Election: 2016 West Bengal Legislative Assembly election
- Government: Second Banerjee ministry
- Opposition: Indian National Congress
- Members: 295 (294 Elected + 1 Nominated)
- Chief Minister: Mamata Banerjee
- Leader of the Opposition: Abdul Mannan
- Party control: All India Trinamool Congress

The Sixteenth Legislative Assembly of West Bengal in India was constituted on 2016 as a result of 2016 West Bengal Legislative Assembly election held between 4 April to 5 May 2016.

== List of members ==
S.No	Constituency	MLA	Present Party	Remarks
Cooch Behar District
1	Mekliganj	Arghya Roy Pradhan	All India Trinamool Congress	
2	Mathabhanga	Binay Krishna Barman	All India Trinamool Congress	
3	Cooch Behar Uttar	Nagendra Nath Roy	All India Forward Bloc	
4	Cooch Behar Dakshin	Mihir Goswami	Bharatiya Janata Party	Defected from TMC in November 2020
5	Sitalkuchi	Hiten Barman	All India Trinamool Congress	
6	Sitai	Jagadish Chandra Barma Basunia	All India Trinamool Congress	
7	Dinhata	Udayan Guha	All India Trinamool Congress	
8	Natabari	Rabindra Nath Ghosh	All India Trinamool Congress	
9	Tufanganj	Fazal Karim Miah	All India Trinamool Congress	
Alipurduar District
10	Kumargram	James Kujur	All India Trinamool Congress	
11	Kalchini	Wilson Champramary	Bharatiya Janata Party	Defected from TMC in June 2019
12	Alipurduars	Sourav Chakraborty	All India Trinamool Congress	
13	Falakata	Vacant		
14	Madarihat	Manoj Tigga	Bharatiya Janata Party	
Jalpaiguri District
15	Dhupguri	Mitali Roy	All India Trinamool Congress	
16	Maynaguri	Ananta Deb Adhikari	All India Trinamool Congress	
17	Jalpaiguri	Sukh Bilas Barma	Indian National Congress	
18	Rajganj	Khageshwar Roy	All India Trinamool Congress	
19	Dabgram-Phulbari	Goutam Deb	All India Trinamool Congress	
20	Mal	Bulu Chik Baraik	All India Trinamool Congress	
21	Nagrakata	Sukra Munda	Bharatiya Janata Party	Defected from TMC in December 2020
Kalimpong District
22	Kalimpong	Sarita Rai	Gorkha Janmukti Morcha	
Darjeeling District
23	Darjeeling	Neeraj Zimba	Bharatiya Janata Party	
24	Kurseong	Rohit Sharma	Gorkha Janmukti Morcha	
25	Matigara-Naxalbari	Sankar Malakar	Indian National Congress	
26	Siliguri	Ashok Bhattacharya	Communist Party of India (Marxist)	
27	Phansidewa	Sunil Chandra Tirkey	Indian National Congress	
Uttar Dinajpur District
28	Chopra	Hamidul Rahman	All India Trinamool Congress	
29	Islampur	Abdul Karim Chowdhury	All India Trinamool Congress	
30	Goalpokhar	Md. Ghulam Rabbani	All India Trinamool Congress	
31	Chakulia	Ali Imran Ramz	All India Forward Bloc	
32	Karandighi	Manodeb Sinha	All India Trinamool Congress	
33	Hemtabad	Vacant		
34	Kaliaganj	Tapan Deb Singha	All India Trinamool Congress	
35	Raiganj	Mohit Sengupta	Indian National Congress	
36	Itahar	Amal Acharjee	Bharatiya Janata Party	Defected from TMC in April 2021
Dakshin Dinajpur District
37	Kushmandi	Narmada Chandra Roy	Revolutionary Socialist Party	
38	Kumarganj	Toraf Hossain Mandal	All India Trinamool Congress	
39	Balurghat	Biswanath Chowdhury	Revolutionary Socialist Party	
40	Tapan	Bachchu Hansda	Bharatiya Janata Party	Defected from TMC in March 2021
41	Gangarampur	Gautam Das	All India Trinamool Congress	Defected from Congress in April 2018
42	Harirampur	Rafikul Islam	Communist Party of India (Marxist)	
Malda District
43	Habibpur	Joyel Murmu	Bharatiya Janata Party	
44	Gazole	Dipali Biswas	Bharatiya Janata Party	Defected from TMC in December 2020
45	Chanchal	Asif Mehbub	Indian National Congress	
46	Harishchandrapur	Alam Mostaque	Indian National Congress	
47	Malatipur	Alberuni Zulkarnain	Indian National Congress	
48	Ratua	Samar Mukherjee	All India Trinamool Congress	Defected from Congress in July 2018
49	Manikchak	MD Mottakin Alam	Indian National Congress	
50	Maldaha	Bhupendra Nath Halder	Indian National Congress	
51	English Bazar	Nihar Ranjan Ghosh	All India Trinamool Congress	Joined in November 2017
52	Mothabari	Sabina Yeasmin	All India Trinamool Congress	Defected from Congress in July 2018
53	Sujapur	Isha Khan Choudhury	Indian National Congress	
54	Baisnabnagar	Swadhin Kumar Sarkar	Bharatiya Janata Party	
Murshidabad District
55	Farakka	Mainul Haque	Indian National Congress	
56	Samserganj	Amirul Islam	All India Trinamool Congress	
57	Suti	Humayun Reza	Indian National Congress	
58	Jangipur	Jakir Hossain	All India Trinamool Congress	
59	Raghunathganj	Akhruzzaman	All India Trinamool Congress	Defected from Congress in July 2018
60	Sagardighi	Subrata Saha	All India Trinamool Congress	
61	Lalgola	Abu Hena	Indian National Congress	
62	Bhagabangola	Mahasin Ali	Communist Party of India (Marxist)	
63	Raninagar	Firoza Begam	Indian National Congress	
64	Murshidabad	Shaoni Singha Roy	All India Trinamool Congress	Defected from Congress in March 2018
65	Nabagram	Kanai Chandra Mondal	All India Trinamool Congress	Defected from CPI(M) in December 2018
66	Khargram	Ashis Marjit	All India Trinamool Congress	Defected from Congress in May 2018
67	Burwan	Protima Rajak	Indian National Congress	
68	Kandi	Shafiul Alam Khan	Indian National Congress	
69	Bharatpur	Kamalesh Chatterjee	Indian National Congress	
70	Rejinagar	Rabiul Alam Chowdhury	All India Trinamool Congress	Defected from Congress in March 2018
71	Beldanga	Safiujjaman Seikh	Indian National Congress	
72	Baharampur	Manoj Chakraborty	Indian National Congress	
73	Hariharpara	Niamot Sheikh	All India Trinamool Congress	
74	Naoda	Sahina Mumtaz Begum	All India Trinamool Congress	
75	Domkal	Anisur Rahman	Communist Party of India (Marxist)	
76	Jalangi	Abdur Razzak	All India Trinamool Congress	Defected from Congress in January 2019
Nadia District
77	Karimpur	Bimalendu Sinha Roy	All India Trinamool Congress	
78	Tehatta	Vacant		
79	Palashipara	Tapas Kumar Saha	All India Trinamool Congress	
80	Kaliganj	Hasanuzzaman Sk	All India Trinamool Congress	Defected from Congress in September 2016
81	Nakashipara	Kallol Khan	All India Trinamool Congress	
82	Chapra	Rukbanur Rahman	All India Trinamool Congress	
83	Krishnanagar Uttar	Vacant		
84	Nabadwip	Pundarikakshya Saha	All India Trinamool Congress	
85	Krishnanagar Dakshin	Ujjal Biswas	All India Trinamool Congress	
86	Santipur	Arindam Bhattacharya	Bharatiya Janata Party	Defected from TMC in January 2021
87	Ranaghat Uttar Paschim	Shankar Singha	All India Trinamool Congress	Defected from Congress in June 2017
88	Krishnaganj	Ashis Kumar Biswas	Bharatiya Janata Party	
89	Ranaghat Uttar Purba	Samir Kumar Poddar	All India Trinamool Congress	
90	Ranaghat Dakshin	Rama Biswas	Communist Party of India (Marxist)	
91	Chakdaha	Ratna Ghosh	All India Trinamool Congress	
92	Kalyani	Ramendra Nath Biswas	All India Trinamool Congress	
93	Haringhata	Nilima Nag	All India Trinamool Congress	
North 24 Parganas District
94	Bagdah	Dulal Chandra Bar	Bharatiya Janata Party	Defected from Congress in June 2019
95	Bangaon Uttar	Biswajit Das	Bharatiya Janata Party	Defected from TMC in June 2019
96	Bangaon Dakshin	Surajit Kumar Biswas	All India Trinamool Congress	
97	Gaighata	Pulin Bihari Ray	All India Trinamool Congress	
98	Swarupnagar	Bina Mondal	All India Trinamool Congress	
99	Baduria	Qazi Abdur Rahim	All India Trinamool Congress	Defected from Congress in November 2020
100	Habra	Jyotipriya Mallick	All India Trinamool Congress	
101	Ashokenagar	Dhiman Roy	All India Trinamool Congress	
102	Amdanga	Rafiqur Rahaman	All India Trinamool Congress	
103	Bijpur	Subhranshu Roy	Bharatiya Janata Party	Defected from TMC in May 2019
104	Naihati	Partha Bhowmick	All India Trinamool Congress	
105	Bhatpara	Pawan Singh	Bharatiya Janata Party	
106	Jagatdal	Parash Dutta	All India Trinamool Congress	
107	Noapara	Sunil Singh	Bharatiya Janata Party	Defected from TMC in June 2019
108	Barrackpore	Shilbhadra Dutta	Bharatiya Janata Party	Defected from TMC in December 2020
109	Khardaha	Amit Mitra	All India Trinamool Congress	
110	Dum Dum Uttar	Tanmoy Bhattacharya	Communist Party of India (Marxist)	
111	Panihati	Nirmal Ghosh	All India Trinamool Congress	
112	Kamarhati	Manas Mukherjee	Communist Party of India (Marxist)	
113	Baranagar	Tapas Roy	All India Trinamool Congress	
114	Dum Dum	Bratya Basu	All India Trinamool Congress	
115	Rajarhat New Town	Sabyasachi Dutta	Bharatiya Janata Party	Defected from TMC in October 2019
116	Bidhannagar	Sujit Bose	All India Trinamool Congress	
117	Rajarhat Gopalpur	Purnendo Bose	All India Trinamool Congress	
118	Madhyamgram	Rathin Ghosh	All India Trinamool Congress	
119	Barasat	Chiranjeet Chakraborty	All India Trinamool Congress	
120	Deganga	Rahima Mondal	All India Trinamool Congress	
121	Haroa	Haji Nurul Islam	All India Trinamool Congress	
122	Minakhan	Usha Rani Mondal	All India Trinamool Congress	
123	Sandeshkhali	Sukumar Mahata	All India Trinamool Congress	
124	Basirhat Dakshin	Dipendu Biswas	Bharatiya Janata Party	Defected from TMC in March 2021
125	Basirhat Uttar	Rafikul Islam Mondal	All India Trinamool Congress	Defected from CPI(M) in October 2020
126	Hingalganj	Debes Mandal	All India Trinamool Congress	
South 24 Parganas District
127	Gosaba	Jayanta Naskar	All India Trinamool Congress	
128	Basanti	Gobinda Chandra Naskar	All India Trinamool Congress	
129	Kultali	Ram Sankar Halder	Communist Party of India (Marxist)	
130	Patharpratima	Samir Kumar Jana	All India Trinamool Congress	
131	Kakdwip	Manturam Pakhira	All India Trinamool Congress	
132	Sagar	Bankim Chandra Hazra	All India Trinamool Congress	
133	Kulpi	Jogaranjan Halder	All India Trinamool Congress	
134	Raidighi	Debashree Roy	All India Trinamool Congress	
135	Mandirbazar	Joydeb Halder	All India Trinamool Congress	
136	Jaynagar	Biswanath Das	All India Trinamool Congress	
137	Baruipur Purba	Nirmal Chandra Mondal	All India Trinamool Congress	
138	Canning Paschim	Shyamal Mondal	All India Trinamool Congress	
139	Canning Purba	Saokat Molla	All India Trinamool Congress	
140	Baruipur Paschim	Biman Banerjee	All India Trinamool Congress	
141	Magrahat Purba	Namita Saha	All India Trinamool Congress	
142	Magrahat Paschim	Giasuddin Molla	All India Trinamool Congress	
143	Diamond Harbour	Dipak Kumar Halder	Bharatiya Janata Party	Defected from TMC in January 2021
144	Falta	Vacant		
145	Satgachia	Sonali Guha	Bharatiya Janata party	Defected from TMC in March 2021
146	Bishnupur (South 24 Parganas)	Dilip Mondal	All India Trinamool Congress	
147	Sonarpur Dakshin	Jiban Mukhopadhyay	All India Trinamool Congress	
148	Bhangar	Abdur Razzak Molla	All India Trinamool Congress	
149	Kasba	Javed Ahmed Khan	All India Trinamool Congress	
150	Jadavpur	Sujan Chakraborty	Communist Party of India (Marxist)	
151	Sonarpur Uttar	Firdousi Begum	All India Trinamool Congress	
152	Tollygunge	Aroop Biswas	All India Trinamool Congress	
153	Behala Purba	Sovan Chatterjee	Independent	Defected from TMC in August 2019; quit BJP in March 2021
154	Behala Paschim	Partha Chatterjee	All India Trinamool Congress	
155	Maheshtala	Dulal Chandra Das	All India Trinamool Congress	
156	Budge Budge	Ashok Kumar Deb	All India Trinamool Congress	
157	Metiaburuz	Abdul Khaleque Molla	All India Trinamool Congress	
Kolkata District
158	Kolkata Port	Firhad Hakim	All India Trinamool Congress	
159	Bhabanipur	Mamata Banerjee	All India Trinamool Congress	
160	Rashbehari	Sovandeb Chattopadhyay	All India Trinamool Congress	
161	Ballygunge	Subrata Mukherjee	All India Trinamool Congress	
162	Chowrangee	Nayana Bandopadhyay	All India Trinamool Congress	
163	Entally	Swarna Kamal Saha	All India Trinamool Congress	
164	Beleghata	Paresh Paul	All India Trinamool Congress	
165	Jorasanko	Smita Bakshi	All India Trinamool Congress	
166	Shyampukur	Shashi Panja	All India Trinamool Congress	
167	Maniktala	Sadhan Pande	All India Trinamool Congress	
168	Kashipur-Belgachhia	Mala Saha	All India Trinamool Congress	
Howrah District
169	Bally	Baishali Dalmiya	Bharatiya Janata Party	Defected from TMC in January 2021
170	Howrah Uttar	Laxmi Ratan Shukla	All India Trinamool Congress	
171	Howrah Madhya	Arup Roy	All India Trinamool Congress	
172	Shibpur	Jatu Lahiri	Bharatiya Janata party	Defected from TMC in March 2021
173	Howrah Dakshin	Brajamohan Majumder	All India Trinamool Congress	
174	Sankrail	Sital Kumar Sardar	Bharatiya Janata party	Defected from TMC in March 2021
175	Panchla	Gulsan Mullick	All India Trinamool Congress	
176	Uluberia Purba	Idris Ali	All India Trinamool Congress	
177	Uluberia Uttar	Nirmal Maji	All India Trinamool Congress	
178	Uluberia Dakshin	Pulak Roy	All India Trinamool Congress	
179	Shyampur	Kalipada Mondal	All India Trinamool Congress	
180	Bagnan	Arunava Sen	All India Trinamool Congress	
181	Amta	Asit Mitra	Indian National Congress	
182	Udaynarayanpur	Samir Kumar Panja	All India Trinamool Congress	
183	Jagatballavpur	MD Abdul Ghani	All India Trinamool Congress	
184	Domjur	Vacant		
Hooghly District
185	Uttarpara	Prabir Kumar Ghosal	Bharatiya Janata Party	Defected from TMC in January 2021
186	Sreerampur	Sudipta Roy	All India Trinamool Congress	
187	Champdani	Abdul Mannan	Indian National Congress	
188	Singur	Rabindranath Bhattacharjee	Bharatiya Janata party	Defected from TMC in March 2021
189	Chandannagar	Indranil Sen	All India Trinamool Congress	
190	Chunchura	Asit Mazumdar	All India Trinamool Congress	
191	Balagarh	Ashim Kumar Majhi	All India Trinamool Congress	
192	Pandua	Sk. Amzad Hossain	Communist Party of India (Marxist)	
193	Saptagram	Tapan Dasgupta	All India Trinamool Congress	
194	Chanditala	Swati Khandoker	All India Trinamool Congress	
195	Jangipara	Snehasis Chakraborty	All India Trinamool Congress	
196	Haripal	Becharam Manna	All India Trinamool Congress	
197	Dhanekhali	Ashima Patra	All India Trinamool Congress	
198	Tarakeswar	Rachhpal Singh	All India Trinamool Congress	
199	Pursurah	M. Nuruzzaman	All India Trinamool Congress	
200	Arambagh	Krishna Chandra Santra	All India Trinamool Congress	
201	Goghat	Manas Majumdar	All India Trinamool Congress	
202	Khanakul	Iqbal Ahmed	All India Trinamool Congress	
Purba Medinipur District
203	Tamluk	Ashok Kumar Dinda	Bharatiya Janata Party	Defected from CPI(M) in December 2020
204	Panskura Purba	Sk. Ibrahim Ali	Communist Party of India (Marxist)	
205	Panskura Paschim	Firoja Bibi	All India Trinamool Congress	
206	Moyna	Sangram Kumar Dolai	All India Trinamool Congress	
207	Nandakumar	Sukumar De	All India Trinamool Congress	
208	Mahisadal	Sudarshan Ghosh Dastidar	All India Trinamool Congress	
209	Haldia	Tapasi Mondal	Bharatiya Janata Party	Defected from CPI(M) in December 2020
210	Nandigram	Suvendu Adhikari	All India Trinamool Congress	
211	Chandipur	Amiya Kanti Bhattacharjee	All India Trinamool Congress	
212	Patashpur	Jyotirmoy Kar	All India Trinamool Congress	
213	Kanthi Uttar	Banasri Maity	Bharatiya Janata Party	Defected from TMC in December 2020
214	Bhagabanpur	Ardhendu Maity	All India Trinamool Congress	
215	Khejuri	Ranajit Mondal	All India Trinamool Congress	
216	Kanthi Dakshin	Chandrima Bhattacharya	All India Trinamool Congress	
217	Ramnagar	Akhil Giri	All India Trinamool Congress	
218	Egra	Vacant		
Paschim Medinipur District
219	Dantan	Bikram Chandra Pradhan	All India Trinamool Congress	
Jhargram District
220	Nayagram	Dulal Murmu	All India Trinamool Congress	
221	Gopiballavpur	Churamani Mahato	All India Trinamool Congress	
222	Jhargram	Vacant		
Paschim Medinipur District
223	Keshiary	Paresh Murmu	All India Trinamool Congress	
224	Kharagpur Sadar	Pradip Sarkar	All India Trinamool Congress	
225	Narayangarh	Prodyut Kumar Ghosh	All India Trinamool Congress	
226	Sabang	Gita Rani Bhunia	All India Trinamool Congress	
227	Pingla	Somen Mahapatra	All India Trinamool Congress	
228	Kharagpur	Dinen Roy	All India Trinamool Congress	
229	Debra	Selima Khatun	All India Trinamool Congress	
230	Daspur	Mamata Bhunia	All India Trinamool Congress	
231	Ghatal	Shankar Dolai	All India Trinamool Congress	
232	Chandrakona	Chhaya Dolai	All India Trinamool Congress	
233	Garbeta	Asish Chakraborty	All India Trinamool Congress	
234	Salboni	Srikanta Mahata	All India Trinamool Congress	
235	Keshpur	Seuli Saha	All India Trinamool Congress	
235	Keshpur	Seuli Saha	All India Trinamool Congress	
236	Medinipur	Vacant		
Jhargram District
237	Binpur	Khagendranath Hembram	All India Trinamool Congress	
Purulia District
238	Bandwan	Rajiblochan Saren	All India Trinamool Congress	
239	Balarampur	Santiram Mahato	All India Trinamool Congress	
240	Baghmundi	Nepal Mahata	Indian National Congress	
241	Joypur	Sakti Pada Mahato	All India Trinamool Congress	
242	Purulia	Sudip Kumar Mukherjee	Bharatiya Janata Party	Defected from TMC in December 2020
243	Manbazar	Sandhya Rani Tudu	All India Trinamool Congress	
244	Kashipur	Swapan Kumar Belthariya	All India Trinamool Congress	
245	Para	Umapada Bauri	All India Trinamool Congress	
246	Raghunathpur	Purna Chandra Bauri	All India Trinamool Congress	
Bankura District
247	Saltora	Swapan Bauri	All India Trinamool Congress	
248	Chhatna	Dhirendra Nath Layek	All India Trinamool Congress	Defected from RSP in May 2018
249	Ranibandh	Jyotsna Mandi	All India Trinamool Congress	
250	Raipur	Birendra Nath Tudu	All India Trinamool Congress	
251	Taldangra	Samir Chakraborty	All India Trinamool Congress	
252	Bankura	Shampa Daripa	All India Trinamool Congress	Defected from Congress in February 2018
253	Barjora	Sujit Chakraborty	Communist Party of India (Marxist)	
254	Onda	Arup Kumar Khan	All India Trinamool Congress	
255	Bishnupur	Tushar Kanti Bhattacharya	All India Trinamool Congress	Defected to TMC in July 2016, joined BJP in 2019, returned to TMC in November 2020
256	Katulpur	Shyamal Santra	All India Trinamool Congress	
257	Indas	Vacant		
258	Sonamukhi	Ajit Ray	Communist Party of India (Marxist)	
Purba Bardhaman District
259	Khandaghosh	Nabin Chandra Bag	All India Trinamool Congress	
260	Bardhaman Dakshin	Rabiranjan Chattopadhyay	All India Trinamool Congress	
261	Raina	Nepal Ghorui	All India Trinamool Congress	
262	Jamalpur	Samar Hazra	Communist Party of India (Marxist)	
263	Manteswar	Saikat Panja	Bharatiya Janata Party	Defected from TMC in December 2020
264	Kalna	Biswajit Kundu	Bharatiya Janata Party	Defected from TMC in December 2020
265	Memari	Nargis Begum	All India Trinamool Congress	
266	Bardhaman Uttar	Nisith Kumar Malik	All India Trinamool Congress	
267	Bhatar	Subhash Mondal	All India Trinamool Congress	
268	Purbasthali Dakshin	Swapan Debnath	All India Trinamool Congress	
269	Purbasthali Uttar	Pradip Kumar Saha	Communist Party of India (Marxist)	
270	Katwa	Rabindranath Chatterjee	All India Trinamool Congress	
271	Ketugram	Sekh Sahonawez	All India Trinamool Congress	
272	Mangalkot	Siddiqullah Chowdhury	All India Trinamool Congress	
273	Ausgram	Abhedananda Thander	All India Trinamool Congress	
274	Galsi	Alok Kumar Majhi	All India Trinamool Congress	
Paschim Bardhaman District
275	Pandaveswar	Jitendra Tiwari	Bharatiya Janata Party	Defected from TMC in March 2021
276	Durgapur Purba	Santosh Debray	Communist Party of India (Marxist)	
277	Durgapur Paschim	Biswanath Parial	All India Trinamool Congress	Defected from Congress in 2019
278	Raniganj	Runu Dutta	Communist Party of India (Marxist)	
279	Jamuria	Jahanara Khan	Communist Party of India (Marxist)	
280	Asansol Dakshin	Tapas Banerjee	All India Trinamool Congress	
281	Asansol Uttar	Moloy Ghatak	All India Trinamool Congress	
282	Kulti	Ujjal Chatterjee	All India Trinamool Congress	
283	Barabani	Bidhan Upadhyay	All India Trinamool Congress	
Birbhum District
284	Dubrajpur	Naresh Chandra Bauri	All India Trinamool Congress	
285	Suri	Asok Chattopadhyay	All India Trinamool Congress	
286	Bolpur	Chandranath Singha	All India Trinamool Congress	
287	Nanoor	Shyamali Pradhan	Communist Party of India (Marxist)	
288	Labpur	Manirul Islam	Independent	Defected from TMC in May 2019 quit BJP in April 2021
289	Sainthia	Nilabati Saha	All India Trinamool Congress	
290	Mayureswar	Abhijit Roy	All India Trinamool Congress	
291	Rampurhat	Asish Banerjee	All India Trinamool Congress	
292	Hansan	Miltan Rasid	Indian National Congress	
293	Nalhati	Moinuddin Shams	All India Trinamool Congress	
294	Murarai	Abdur Rahaman	All India Trinamool Congress	

- Members who won on from different parties but later joined All India Trinamool Congress.
- Members who won on from different parties but later joined Bharatiya Janata Party.
