= Pradip Lodha =

Indian politician (born 1961)

Member of the West Bengal Legislative Assembly
- Incumbent
- Assumed office 4 May 2026
- Preceded by: Uttara Singha
- Constituency: Garbeta

Personal details
- Born: 1961 (age 64–65)
- Party: Bharatiya Janata Party
- Profession: Politician

Pradip Lodha (born 1961) is an Indian politician from West Bengal. He is a member of the West Bengal Legislative Assembly from the Garbeta Assembly constituency in Paschim Medinipur district representing the Bharatiya Janata Party.

== Early life and education ==
Lodha is from Garbeta, Paschim Medinipur district, West Bengal. He is the son of the late Nandalal Lodha. He completed his BCom at a college affiliated with the University of Calcutta in 1982. He along with his wife, runs the family business. He declared assets worth Rs.1 crore in 2016 and Rs.6 crore in 2026, in his affidavit to the Election Commission of India.

== Career ==
Lodha won the Garbeta Assembly constituency representing the Bharatiya Janata Party in the 2026 West Bengal Legislative Assembly election. He polled 1,13,752 votes and defeated his nearest rival and sitting MLA, Uttara Singha of the All India Trinamool Congress, by a margin of 26,225 votes. In the 2016 West Bengal Legislative Assembly election, he contested from Garbeta and finished third behind winner, Asish Chakraborty of the Trinamool Congress and Sorforaj Khan of the Communist Party of India (Marxist).
