= List of leaders of the opposition in the West Bengal Legislative Assembly =

Opposition leader in West Bengal

Leader of the Opposition West Bengal Legislative Assembly
- Seal of West Bengal Government

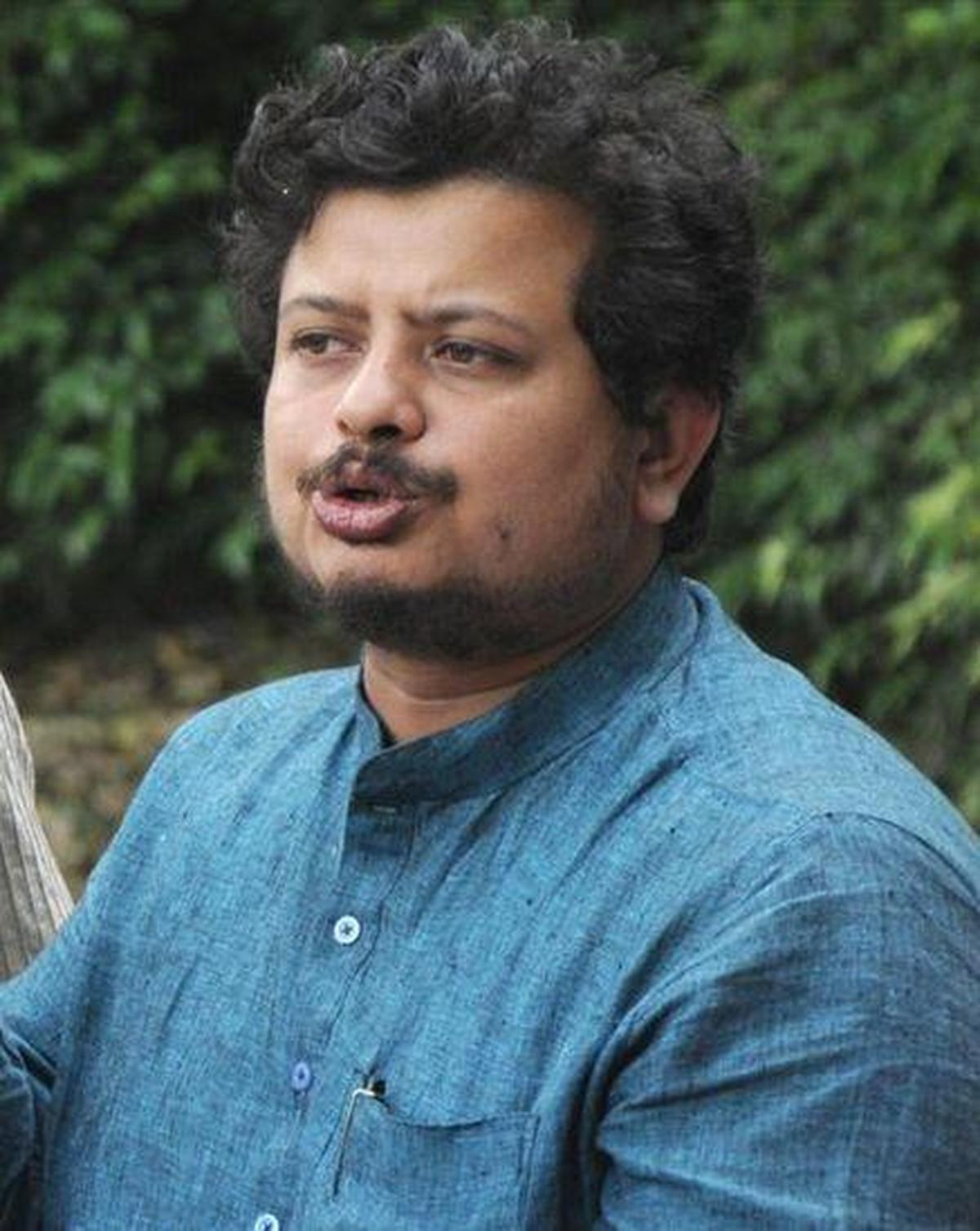
- Incumbent; Ritabrata Banerjee since 3 June 2026
- Style: The Hon’ble
- Member of: West Bengal Legislative Assembly
- Reports to: West Bengal Government
- Seat: Vidhan Bhaban, Kolkata
- Nominator: Members of the Primary Opposition's Legislative Party
- Appointer: Speaker of the Assembly
- Term length: 5 years Till the Assembly Continues
- Formation: 12 January 1937; 89 years ago

The Leader of the Opposition in the West Bengal Legislative Assembly is the politician who leads the official opposition in the West Bengal Legislative Assembly.

== Eligibility ==
Official Opposition is a term used in West Bengal Legislative Assembly to designate the political party which has secured the second largest number of seats in the assembly. In order to get formal recognition, the party must have at least 10% of total membership of the Legislative Assembly. A single party has to meet the 10% seat criterion, not an alliance. Many of the other Indian state legislatures also follow this 10% rule, while the rest prefer single largest opposition party according to the rules of their respective houses.

== List of leaders of the opposition ==
No	Name	Constituency	Term			Assembly (Election)	Party	Ref.
1	Jyoti Basu	Baranagar	1957	1962	4–5 years	2nd (1957 election)	Communist Party of India	
1	Jyoti Basu	Baranagar	1962	1967	4–5 years	3rd (1962 election)	Communist Party of India	
2	Khagendra Nath Dasgupta	Jalpaiguri	1967	1969	1–2 years	4th (1967 election)	Indian National Congress	
3	Siddhartha Shankar Ray	Chowranghee	1969	1971	1–2 years	5th (1969 election)	Indian National Congress	
(1)	Jyoti Basu	Baranagar	1971	1972	0–1 years	6th (1971 election)	Communist Party of India (Marxist)	
4	Biswanath Mukherjee	Midnapore	1972	1977	4–5 years	7th (1972 election)	Communist Party of India	
–	Vacant		1977	1982	4–5 years	8th (1977 election)	N/A	
5	Abdus Sattar	Lalgola	1982	1987	4–5 years	9th (1982 election)	Indian National Congress	
5	Abdus Sattar	Lalgola	1987	1990	3–4 years	10th (1987 election)	Indian National Congress	
(3)	Siddharth Shankar Ray		1991	1993	1–2 years		Indian National Congress	
6	Zainal Abedin	Itahar	1994	1996	1–2 years	11th (1991 election)	Indian National Congress	
7	Atish Chandra Sinha	Kandi	1996	2001	4–5 years	12th (1996 election)	Indian National Congress	
8	Pankaj Kumar Banerjee	Tollygunge	14 June 2001	12 May 2006	4 years, 332 days	13th (2001 election)	Trinamool Congress	
9	Partha Chatterjee	Behala Paschim	21 September 2006	13 May 2011	4 years, 234 days	14th (2006 election)	Trinamool Congress	
10	Surjya Kanta Mishra	Narayangarh	1 June 2011	25 May 2016	4 years, 359 days	15th (2011 election)	Communist Party of India (Marxist)	
11	Abdul Mannan	Champdani	2 June 2016	3 May 2021	4 years, 335 days	16th (2016 election)	Indian National Congress	
12	Suvendu Adhikari	Nandigram	13 May 2021	6 May 2026	4 years, 358 days	17th (2021 election)	Bharatiya Janata Party	
13	Ritabrata Banerjee	Uluberia Purba	3 June 2026	Incumbent	139 days	18th (2026 election)	Democratic Trinamool Congress	

== List of deputy opposition leaders ==
Name	Term	Party
Ambica Banerjee	1996–2006	Indian National Congress
Ambica Banerjee	1996–2006	Trinamool Congress
Abu Hasem Khan Choudhury	2006–2009	Indian National Congress
Manas Bhunia	2009–2011	Indian National Congress
Subhas Naskar	2011–2016	Revolutionary Socialist Party
Nepal Mahata	2016–2021	Indian National Congress
Mihir Goswami	2021–2026	Bharatiya Janata Party
Ashima Patra; Nayna Bandyopadhyay	9 May 2026 - 2 June 2026	Trinamool Congress
Sandipan Saha; Javed Ahmed Khan; Sabina Yeasmin; Seuli Saha	3 June 2026–Incumbent	Democratic Trinamool Congress
