= ABTA =

ABTA may refer to:

- ABTA (trade association), the UK travel trade association for tour operators and travel agents
- All Bengal Teachers Association, a teacher's movement in the Indian state of West Bengal
- American Brain Tumor Association, a not-for-profit organization
