= Asit Mazumdar =

Indian politician

Asit Mazumdar অসিত মজুমদার

President of Hooghly Sreerampur Organisational District Trinamool Congress
- Incumbent
- Assumed office 15 June 2026
- Preceded by: Arindam Guin

Member of the West Bengal Legislative Assembly
- In office 20 May 2011 – 4 May 2026
- Preceded by: Naren Dey
- Succeeded by: Subir Nag
- Constituency: Chunchura

Vice Chairperson of South Bengal State Transport Corporation
- In office 20 July 2016 – 4 May 2026

Vice President of Hooghly District Trinamool Congress
- In office 8 November 2020 – 15 June 2026
- President: Dilip Yadav Snehasis Chakraborty Arindam Guin
- Preceded by: Suma Mukherjee

Personal details
- Born: 14 November 1958 (age 67) Serampore, West Bengal
- Party: Trinamool Congress
- Spouse: Lily Majumder
- Children: 1
- Profession: Advocate

Asit Mazumdar is an Indian politician.He is Currently Serving President of Sreerampore Hooghly Organisational District Trinamool Congress. He was elected as MLA of Chunchura Vidhan Sabha Constituency in West Bengal Legislative Assembly in 2011, 2016 and 2021. He is a Trinamool Congress politician. He was served Vice Chairman of South Bengal State Transport Corporation and Vice President of Hooghly District Trinamool Congress.
