= Satyapriya Roy =

- সত্যপ্রিয় রায়

General Secretary of the All Bengal Teachers Association
- In office 1953–1964

President of the All Bengal Teachers Association
- In office 1964 - 1977

Working President of the All Bengal Teachers Association
- In office 1952 -53

Administrator, West Bengal Board of Secondary Education
- In office 14 September 1977 – 11 February 1978

Minister of Education, Government of West Bengal
- In office 25 February 1969 - 1972

Member of the West Bengal Legislative Council
- In office 1954 - 1969
- Constituency: Presidency Division South (Teachers)

Member of the West Bengal Legislative Assembly
- In office 1969 - 1972
- Preceded by: Niranjan Sengupta
- Succeeded by: Pankaj Kumar Banerjee
- Constituency: Tollyganj

Personal details
- Born: 1 March 1907
- Died: 11 February 1978 (aged 70)
- Party: Communist Party of India (Marxist)

Satyapriya Roy (1907–1978) was a politician belonging to the Communist Party of India (Marxist). A prominent leader of the teacher's movement. He was the General Secretary of the All Bengal Teachers Association from 1953 to 1964. He was the education minister in the West Bengal Government during the second Mukherjee ministry.

== History ==
Satyapriya Roy was born on 1 March 1907, in a well-to-do family at Singai in what is now Mymensingh district of Bangladesh.

Graduated with English Honors from Anand Mohan College, Mymensingh. In 1927, he completed his master's degree in English from Dhaka University. Also received excellency in Bachelor of Teaching examination (later renamed as Bachelor of Education).

Had an excellent academic career, he passed the All India Police Service Examination, but did not take any position in the police department. Instead, he became a teacher and, in fact, the founding headmaster of the Kalidhan Institution in South Calcutta.

Roy was elected vice-president of ABTA at the Bishnupur conference in 1950, becoming its working president in 1952. In 1953 he was elected General Secretary of ABTA and Manoranjan Roy was elected president. He was the secretary of the organization until 1964, then he was elevated to the post of President, a position he held until he was appointed administrator of the West Bengal Board of Secondary Education in 1977.

Roy was elected a member of the State Legislative Council as a teacher representative in 1954 and continued to be its member until 1969 when it was dissolved by the United Front government. In both the 1969 and 1971 elections, he won the Legislative Assembly as a CPIM candidate from Tollyganj constituency. He was the education minister in the second United Front government.

He died on 11 February 1978.

== Legacy ==
Roy was one of those who founded the All Bengal Teachers Training College, and was also its president for several years. The college was renamed as Satyapriya Roy College of Education in the year 2006 to acknowledge the contribution of Satyapriya Roy in the field of school education as well as the teacher's movement.
