= Muzaffar Khan =

Indian politician

MLA, West Bengal Legislative Assembly
- In office 2011–2016
- Preceded by: Jibesh Chakrabarty
- Succeeded by: Abdul Mannan
- Constituency: Champdani

Personal details
- Party: All India Trinamool Congress

Muzaffar Khan is an Indian politician belonging to All India Trinamool Congress. He was elected as MLA of Champdani Vidhan Sabha Constituency in West Bengal Legislative Assembly in 2011.
