= Papiya Adhikari =

Indian actress

Papiya Adhikari Dey

Member of West Bengal Legislative Assembly
- Incumbent
- Assumed office 4 May 2026
- Preceded by: Aroop Biswas
- Constituency: Tollygunj

Personal details
- Born: Papiya Adhikari; 18 August 1961 (age 65) Calcutta, West Bengal, India
- Party: Bharatiya Janata Party (2021–present)
- Spouse: Tamal Kanti Dey
- Children: Suchetana Dey; Sunayana Dey
- Parent: Kalyani Adhikari (mother)
- Education: B.A.
- Occupation: Actress; politician
- Years active: 1982–present
- Stage debut: Bishe June (1982) directed by Gyanesh Mukherjee
- Screen debut: Sonar Sansar (1985)

Papiya Adhikari Dey is an Indian actress and politician who is primarily known for her work in Bengali theatre, radio, television and Bengali cinema.

== Early life ==
Adhikari was born in Kolkata, in the Indian state of West Bengal on 18 August 1961.

== Career ==
She first acted in Sonar Sansar, a movie directed by Ratish De Sarkar. She got the break through after playing the lead role in Soshane Kandche Lakkhi. Adhikari received best actress award from the Government of West Bengal for this performance.

She played the role of heroine as well as supporting part in number of Bengali films. Adhikari is also active in small screen and Bengali tele-serials like Gachkouto, Chokher Tara Tui and Gangster Ganga.

== Political career ==
She joined the Bharatiya Janata Party on 17 February 2021. She contested in 2021 West Bengal Legislative Assembly election from Uluberia Dakshin constituency but lost. She contested in 2026 West Bengal Legislative Assembly election from Tollygunj Assembly constituency and won.

== Controversy ==
In November 2026, Adhikari attracted media attention after stating at a Kali Puja event that bursting firecrackers could cure diseases. Following criticism, she attributed the remark to traditional beliefs, apologised and said she was withdrawing the statement.

== Filmography ==
Year	Title	Note
1985	Sonar Sansar	
	Pratigna	
1987	Swarnamoir Thikana	
	Mouna Mukhar	
	Agaman	
	Pratik	
	Pathe Jete Jete	
	Nishi Badhu	
	Abhisar	
	Pratisodh (2004 film)	
	Pati Param Guru	
	Rajar Meye Parul	
	Sampradan	
	Mayer Adar	
	Shanka	
	Hanshi Khushi Club	
	Rose Crazy Rose	
	Probahini	
	Kintu Galpo Noy	
	Babli	
	Moner Majhe Tumi	
	Sotoroi September	
	Ami Jajabor	
1989	Bidhir Bidhan	Bengali/Odia film
1989	Sansar	
1989	Michha Maya Sansara	Odia film

== Bibliography ==
- Gita Chowdhury, ed. (June 1986). Sukanya.
