= Pankaj Kumar Banerjee =

Indian politician and marine engineer

Leader of the Opposition in West Bengal
- In office 2001–2006
- Deputy: Ambica Banerjee
- Preceded by: Atish Chandra Sinha
- Succeeded by: Partha Chatterjee

MLA of Tollyganj Vidhan Sabha Constituency
- In office 1972–1977
- Preceded by: Satyapriya Roy
- Succeeded by: Prasanta Sur
- In office 1996–2006
- Preceded by: Prasanta Sur
- Succeeded by: Aroop Biswas

Personal details
- Born: 27 July 1945
- Died: 26 October 2018 (aged 73)
- Party: Trinamool Congress (1998–2006); Indian National Congress (1968–1998)
- Spouse: Aparna Bandyapadhyay
- Children: 1
- Education: Dinabandhu Andrews College (B.Sc); B.E. in Marine Engineering

Pankaj Kumar Banerjee was an Indian politician and marine engineer belonging to Trinamool Congress. He was elected as MLA of Tollygunge Vidhan Sabha Constituency in West Bengal Legislative Assembly in 1972, 1996 and 2001. He served as Leader of the Opposition of West Bengal Legislative Assembly from 2001 to 2006.

Bandyopadhyay was married to Aparna Bandyopadhyay. Pragga Bandyopadhyay is their only daughter.

Bandyopadhyay died on 26 October 2018 at the age of 73.
