= Arindam Guin =

Indian politician

Arindam Guin (Bubai)

Member of the West Bengal Legislative Assembly
- In office 2 May 2021 – 5 May 2026
- Preceded by: Abdul Mannan
- Succeeded by: Dilip Singh
- Constituency: Champdani

Arindam Guin, also known as Bubai, is an Indian politician and member of Trinamool Congress. He was elected as MLA of West Bengal Legislative Assembly in 2021 assembly election from Champdani Constituency. He was also a Councillor since 2010 and well known Chairperson of Baidyabati Municipality since 2015 to 2021.He is well known as AG Boss in Hooghly dist.
