= Hanshi Khushi Club =

2009 film

- Directed by: Shankha Bandyopadhyay
- Screenplay by: Shankha Bandyopadhyay
- Story by: Shankha Bandyopadhyay
- Produced by: The Voice
- Starring: Jeet; Barsha Priyadarshini; Biswajit Chakraborty; Papiya Adhikari; Bireswar Mukhopadhyay; Lama
- Edited by: Atish Dey Sarkar
- Music by: Shankha Bandyopadhyay
- Production company: The Voice
- Distributed by: The Voice
- Release date: 21 August 2009
- Running time: 106 min.
- Country: India
- Language: Bengali

Hanshi Khushi Club is a 2009 Bengali comedy film directed by Shankha Bandyopadhyay. The film's music was composed by Shankha Bandyopadhyay.

== Cast ==
- Jeet as Aniket
- Barsha Priyadarshini as Hiya
- Biswajit Chakraborty as Mama Da
- Papiya Adhikari as Ranjana Boudi
- Bireswar Mukhopadhyay
- Biswanath Basu as Kobi
- Mimi Dutta as Riya

== Soundtrack ==
1. "Hasi Khushi Club" -Pratik Chowdhury
2. "Cholo Na Jayee" - Javed Ali, Debjani Dutta
3. "Amaar Bhitor O Bahire" - Debjani Dutta
4. "Ghorete Bhromor Elo" - Debjani Dutta
5. "Mono Pakhi" (version 1) - Javed Ali, Debjani Dutta
6. "Mono Pakhi" (version 2) - Kumar Sanu, Debjani Dutta
7. "Phule Phule" - Debjani Dutta
8. "Muktiro Mandiro Sopano Tole" (version 1) - Sankha Banerjee
9. "Muktiro Mandiro Sopano Tole"(version 2) -Kumar Sanu
