= Chinmoy Deb Barman =

Indian politician

Member of the West Bengal Legislative Assembly
- Incumbent
- Assumed office 2 May 2021
- Preceded by: Dipali Biswas
- Constituency: Gazole

Personal details
- Born: 21 April 1984 (age 42)
- Party: Bharatiya Janata Party
- Spouse: Payel Barman
- Parent: Nirmal Chandra Barman
- Education: Rabindra Bharati University
- Occupation: Social Work; Business
- Profession: Politician

Chinmoy Deb Barman is an Indian politician from West Bengal. He is a member of Bharatiya Janata Party. In May 2021, he was elected as a member of the West Bengal Legislative Assembly from Gazole constituency. He defeated Basanti Barman of All India Trinamool Congress by 1,798 votes in 2021 West Bengal Assembly election.

== Early life and education ==
Barman is from, Malda district of West Bengal. He has done Master of Arts from Rabindra Bharati University in the year 2008.

== Political career ==
He is a member of West Bengal Legislative Assembly for the second consecutive term from Gazole Assembly constituency.

=== Electoral performance ===
West Bengal Legislative Assembly
Year	Constituency	Party	Votes	%	Opponent	Party	Votes	%	Margin	Result
2021	Gazole	BJP	100,655	45.5	Basanti Barman	AITC	98,857	44.69	1,798	Won
2026	Gazole	BJP	131,541	53.94	Prasenjit Das	AITC	93,349	38.28	38,192	Won

== See also ==
- 2026 West Bengal Legislative Assembly election
- List of chief ministers of West Bengal
- West Bengal Legislative Assembly
- 18th West Bengal Assembly
