= Prasanta Sur =

Indian politician

Prasanta Kumar Sur প্রশান্ত কুমার শূর
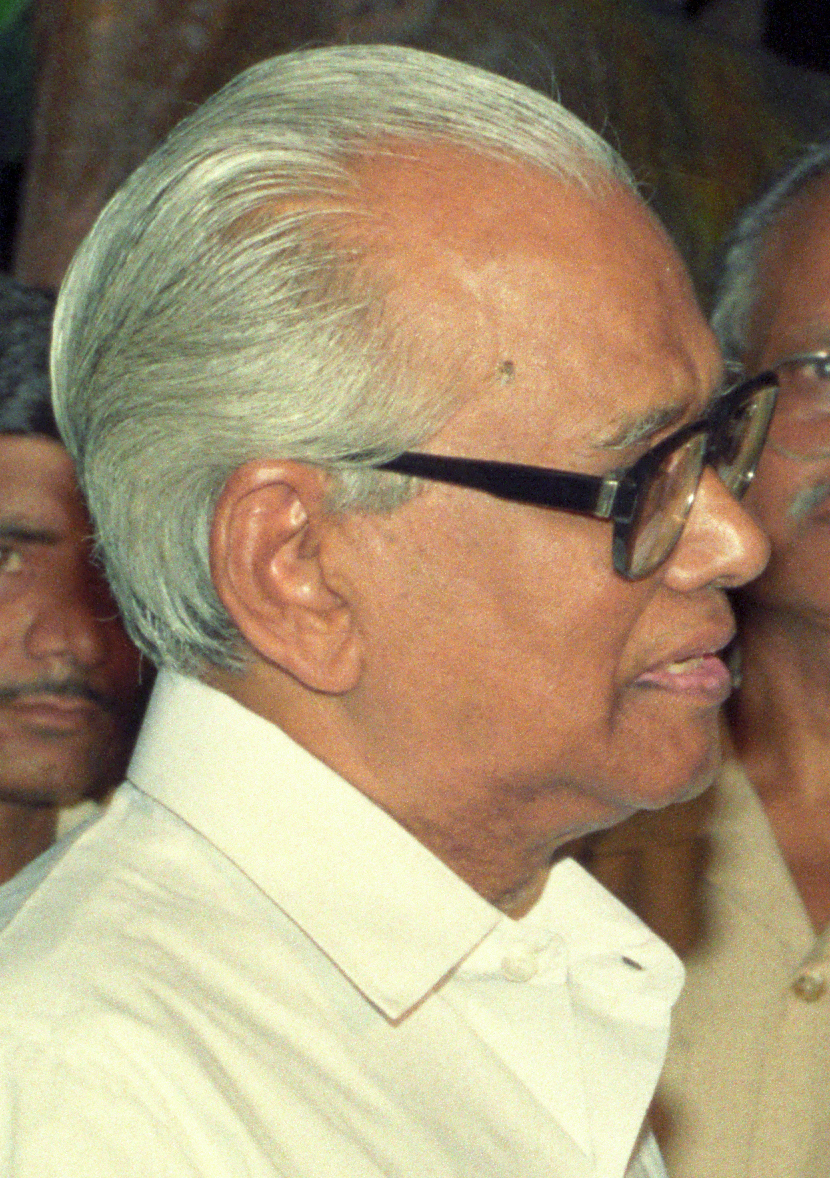

Minister of Health & Urban Development, Government of West Bengal
- In office 1977–1996
- Preceded by: Zainal Abedin
- Succeeded by: Dr. Surjya Kanta Mishra (as Minister of Health); Ashok Bhattacharya (as Minister of Urban Development)

Member of West Bengal Legislative Assembly
- In office 1977–1996
- Preceded by: Pankaj Kumar Banerjee
- Succeeded by: Pankaj Kumar Banerjee
- Constituency: Tollygunge

Personal details
- Born: 1 January 1923 Barisal, Bengal Presidency, British India
- Died: 29 February 2008 (aged 85) Tollygunge, Kolkata, West Bengal, India
- Party: Communist Party of India (Marxist) (1964–2008); Communist Party of India (until 1964)
- Education: University of Calcutta
- Profession: Politician, social worker

Prasanta Sur election poster

Prasanta Sur (Bengali: প্রশান্ত শূর; 1 January 1923 – 29 February 2008) was an Indian politician, and the convenor of the Kolkata district Left Front committee who became the first Left Front Mayor of Kolkata during 1969. A member of the state committee of Communist Party of India (Marxist), Sur was the urban development minister in the first Left Front government in 1977. Later, he also held key portfolios like health, refugee rehabilitation etc. He died on 29 February 2008, aged 85, after suffering from age-related problems.

== Family background and early life ==
Sur's father was Rai Saheb Nagendra Kumar Sur, a member of the landed gentry of (erstwhile) east Pakistan. The Rai Saheb disowned him after Prasanta Sur joined the Communist movement in Kolkata. An obstinate and proud man, the Rai Saheb continued to live at his home in East Pakistan until he was assassinated by the Pakistani Army in 1971. He was one of the prominent contemporary left front leaders like Saroj Dutta, Jyoti Basu, Geeta Mukherjee and Hare Krishna Konar.

Sur qualified as a lawyer but never practiced law as he became a full-timer in the CPI.

== Refugee movement ==
Sur joined the Communist Party of India in 1949.

== Electoral politics ==
When CPI split up, he joined the Communist Party of India (Marxist).

During the repression of the Communists in the late sixties Sur had to remain underground and was also in prison. In 1969 he became the first Communist Mayor of Kolkata.

In 1968, he entered the assembly election scenario. He won the Tollygunge assembly seat successively in 1977, 1982, 1987 and 1991.

== Urban development ==
Sur was urban development minister from 1977 to 1982. Under him, the then Kolkata Metropolitan Development Authority got off the ground, becoming a prime agency for development.

The UF government came to office and was gone before it could really dig itself in. Nevertheless, this was different at the Kolkata Municipal Corporation. There the Left won the civic polls, and stayed in office until 1972. Prasanta Sur had become the first Communist mayor of metropolis, and commenced the move that was aimed at reorienting the developmental drive of the civic body towards the mass of the people, especially the urban poor, and the refugees who had kept coming to the city and its surroundings, all the while.

Prasanta Sur was the urban development minister of the Left Front government from 1977 till 1982, it was under him that the then Calcutta Metropolitan Development Authority (CMDA, now KMDA), really got off the ground, becoming a prime agency for development from the moribund state it had been put in.

A host of roads, bridges, and the Sealdah fly-over were constructed under him despite violent opposition by both factions of the Pradesh Congress (Subrata Mukherjee had then split from and was virtually at war with the Somen Mitra-led fraction). He was assaulted in a brutish way—he carried the marks on his face well into his sunset years—when going on a house-to-house campaign in the Sealdah region, explaining to the people the need for the fly-over to be constructed. Sur was also the founder of Netaji Nagar Day college.

== Health ==
Prasanta Sur was also a great success as a health minister of the LF government (1987–1996), and he especially turned his attention to the development of a rural health network while strengthening the government-run hospitals and research centres in the cities, large, and small.

== Later life and death ==
In 1998, he lost to Mamata Banerjee in the Calcutta South (Lok Sabha constituency).

A simple man of humble disposition, and uncomplicated lifestyle, he, thereafter, devoted himself full-time to party work.

He died on 29 February 2008. As per his wishes his body was donated for medical research to Nilratan Sarkar Medical College in Kolkata.

The last journey from Alimuddin Street to NRS Hospital was attended by thousands of party workers and ordinary people paying their last salute to the strains of the "Communist Internationale".
