= Subir Nag =

Indian politician

Member of the West Bengal Legislative Assembly
- Incumbent
- Assumed office May 2026
- Preceded by: Asit Mazumdar
- Constituency: Chunchura

Personal details
- Party: Bharatiya Janata Party
- Spouse: Susmita Nag
- Children: 1
- Parent: Sankar Ranjan Nag
- Education: University of Burdwan
- Occupation: Business
- Profession: Politician

Subir Nag (born 1973) is an Indian politician from West Bengal. He is a member of West Bengal Legislative Assembly from the Chunchura Assembly constituency in Hooghly district representing the Bharatiya Janata Party.

== Early life and education ==
Nag is from Chunchura, Hooghly district of West Bengal. He is the son of the late Sankar Ranjan Nag. He completed his Bachelor of Science at a college affiliated with University of Burdwan in 1995, and later did Diploma in Civil Engineering and passed the examinations conducted by the West Bengal State Council of Technical Education in 1996. He runs his own business and declared assets worth ₹ 3 crore in his affidavit to the Election Commission of India.

== Political career ==
Nag won the Chunchura Assembly constituency representing the BJP in the 2026 West Bengal Legislative Assembly election. He polled 1,37,704 votes and defeated his nearest rival Debangshu Bhattacharya if the All India Trinamool Congress by a margin of 43,435 votes.

=== Electoral performance ===
West Bengal Legislative Assembly
Year	Constituency	Party	Votes	%	Opponent	Party	Votes	%	Margin	Result
2026	Chunchura	BJP	1,37,704	53.96	Debangshu Bhattacharya	AITC	94,269	36.94	43,435	Won
