= Ambika Chakrabarty =

Indian independence movement activist and revolutionary (1892–1962)

Ambika Chakraborty
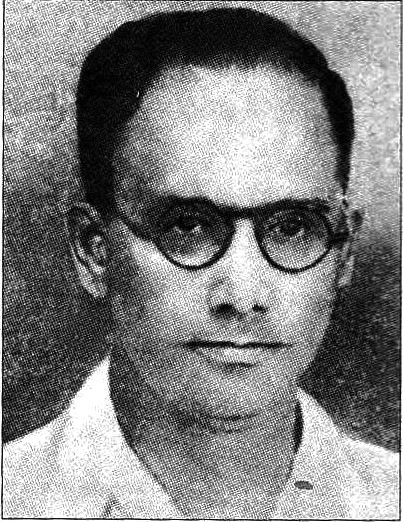
- Born: January 1892; Chittagong, Bengal, British India
- Died: 6 March 1962 (aged 70); Calcutta, West Bengal, India
- Organization: Jugantar
- Political party: Communist Party of India

Ambika Chakrabarty (January 1892 – 6 March 1962) was an Indian independence movement activist and revolutionary. Later, he was a leader of the Communist Party of India and a member of the West Bengal Legislative Assembly.

== Revolutionary activities ==
Ambika Chakrabarty's father's name was Nanda Kumar Chakarabarty. He was a member of Chittagong Jugantar party. He took part in the Chittagong armoury raid led by Surya Sen. On 18 April 1930, he led a group of revolutionaries, who destroyed the entire communication system in Chittagong. On 22 April 1930, he was seriously injured in the gunfight with the British army in Jalalabad. But he was able to escape. After a few months, he was arrested by the police from his hideout and sentenced to death. However, on appeal the sentence was reduced to transportation for life to the Cellular Jail in Port Blair.

== Later activities ==
Chakrabarty, after his release from the Cellular Jail in 1946, joined the Communist Party of India. He was elected to the Bengal Provincial Legislative Assembly in the same year. In 1952, he was elected to the West Bengal Legislative Assembly from Tollygunge (South) constituency as a Communist Party of India candidate. He died in a road accident in Calcutta on 6 March 1962.

== See also ==
- Ganesh Ghosh
- Ananta Singh
