= Uttara Singha =

Indian politician

Uttara Singha Hazra (born 1965) is an Indian politician from West Bengal. She is a member of the West Bengal Legislative Assembly from Garbeta Assembly constituency in Paschim Medinipur district. She won the 2021 West Bengal Legislative Assembly election representing the All India Trinamool Congress party.

== Early life and education ==
Singha is from Salboni, Medinipur Sadar subdivision, Paschim Medinipur district, West Bengal. She married Tarun Kumar Hazra. She completed her BA at Midnapore College, which is affiliated with Vidyasagar University.

== Career ==
Singha won from Garbeta Assembly constituency representing the All India Trinamool Congress in the 2021 West Bengal Legislative Assembly election. She polled 94,928 votes and defeated his nearest rival, Madan Ruidas of the Bharatiya Janata Party, by a margin of 10,572 votes.
