= Dipali Biswas =

Indian politician (born 1970)

Member of the West Bengal Legislative Assembly
- In office 2016–2021
- Preceded by: Sushil Chandra Roy
- Succeeded by: Chinmoy Deb Barman
- Constituency: Gazole

Personal details
- Born: 2 August 1970 (age 55)
- Party: Trinamool Congress (2018–2020) (2024-Till now)
- Other political affiliations: Bharatiya Janata Party (2020–2024); Communist Party of India (Marxist) (until 2018)
- Occupation: Politician

Dipali Biswas (born 2 August 1970) is an Indian politician and member of the West Bengal Legislative Assembly. She was elected as the representative of the Gazole constituency in the 2016 West Bengal Legislative Assembly election as a candidate of the Communist Party of India (Marxist). In 2016, she switched her party to Trinamool Congress and in 2020, she switched to the Bharatiya Janata Party (BJP).

== Personal life ==
Dipali Biswas is married to Ranjit Biswas and a resident of Gazole Town in the district of Malda, West Bengal. She was educated at the Bardanga Raghunath High School and became an Integrated Child Development Services worker.

== Political career ==
In the 2016 West Bengal Legislative Assembly election, Dipali Biswas was nominated to contest from the Gazole constituency in West Bengal as the candidate of the Communist Party of India (Marxist). The election resulted in Biswas emerging as the winning candidate with a margin of over 20,000 votes and polling at 43.47% of the votes cast against 32.95% of the votes cast in favor of Sushil Chandra Roy of the Trinamool Congress and 14.51% of the votes cast in favor of Sudhanshu Sarkar of the BJP.

In 2018, she joined the Trinamool Congress party, and on 19 December 2020, she joined the Bharatiya Janata Party.

State Legislative Assembly
Preceded by Sushil Chandra Roy (INC)	Member of the West Bengal Legislative Assembly from Gazole Assembly constituency 2016–	Incumbent
