= Gazole Assembly constituency =

Gazole
- Constituency No. 44 for the West Bengal Legislative Assembly
- Interactive Map Outlining Gazole Assembly Constituency

Constituency details
- Country: India
- Region: East India
- State: West Bengal
- District: Malda
- Lok Sabha constituency: Maldaha Uttar
- Established: 1951
- Total electors: 267,096
- Reservation: SC

Member of Legislative Assembly
- 18th West Bengal Legislative Assembly
- Incumbent Chinmoy Deb Barman
- Party: BJP
- Alliance: NDA
- Elected year: 2026

Gazole Assembly constituency is an assembly constituency in Malda district in the Indian state of West Bengal. It is reserved for scheduled castes.

== Overview ==
As per orders of the Delimitation Commission, No. 44 Gazole Assembly constituency (SC) covers Gazole community development block.

Gazole Assembly constituency is part of No. 7 Maldaha Uttar (Lok Sabha constituency).

== Members of the Legislative Assembly ==
Year	Name	Party
1951	Dharanidhar Sarkar	Communist Party of India
1957	No seat	
1962	No seat	
1967	D. Murmu	Indian National Congress
1969	Lakshman Saren	Indian National Congress
1971	Suphal Murmu	Communist Party of India (Marxist)
1972	Benjamin Hembrom	Indian National Congress
1977	Suphal Murmu	Communist Party of India (Marxist)
1982	Suphal Murmu	Communist Party of India (Marxist)
1987	Suphal Murmu	Communist Party of India (Marxist)
1991	Debnath Murmu	Communist Party of India (Marxist)
1996	Debnath Murmu	Communist Party of India (Marxist)
2001	Sadhu Tudu	Communist Party of India (Marxist)
2006	Sadhu Tudu	Communist Party of India (Marxist)
2011	Sushil Chandra Roy	Indian National Congress
2016	Dipali Biswas	Communist Party of India (Marxist)
2021	Chinmoy Deb Barman	Bharatiya Janata Party
2026	Chinmoy Deb Barman	Bharatiya Janata Party

== Election results ==
=== 2026 ===
2026 West Bengal Legislative Assembly election: Gazole
Party	Candidate	Votes	%	±%
BJP	Chinmoy Deb Barman	131,541	53.94	+8.44
AITC	Prasenjit Das	93,349	38.28	−6.41
CPI(M)	Kshitish Chandra Sarkar	5,949	2.44	−3.87
INC	Prem Chowdhury	5,050	2.07	
NOTA	None of the above	1,493	0.61	−0.17
Majority		38,192	15.66	+14.85
Turnout		243,885	95.5	+12.68
BJP hold		Swing		

=== 2021 ===
West Bengal assembly elections, 2021: Gazole
Party	Candidate	Votes	%	±%
BJP	Chinmoy Deb Barman	100,655	45.5	
AITC	Basanti Barman	98,857	44.69	
CPI(M)	Arun Kumar Biswas	13,950	6.31	
NOTA	None of the above	1,736	0.78	
Majority		1,798	0.81	
Turnout		221,214	82.82	
BJP gain from CPI(M)		Swing		

=== 2016 ===
In the 2016 election, Dipali Biswas of CPI(M) defeated his nearest rival Sushil Chandra Roy of Trinamool Congress.

2016 West Bengal state assembly election: Gazole
Party	Candidate	Votes	%	±%
CPI(M)	Dipali Biswas	85,949	43.34	▲0.69
AITC	Sushil Chandra Roy	65,347	32.95	New
BJP	Sudhangsu Sarkar	28,768	14.51	▲9.25
SP	Kamal Chandra Sarkar	4,313	2.17	
NOTA	None of the above	3,490	1.76	N/A
Majority		20,602	10.39	▲6.94
Turnout		1,98,327	84.82	▼1.84
CPI(M) gain from INC		Swing		

Note- In 2016 election, the Indian National Congress supported CPIM in this seat.

=== 2011 ===
In the 2011 election, Sushil Chandra Roy of Congress defeated his nearest rival Gobinda Mondal of CPI(M).

West Bengal assembly elections, 2011: Gazole (SC) constituency
Party	Candidate	Votes	%	±%
INC	Sushil Chandra Roy	74,654	46.10	▲7.44
CPI(M)	Gobinda Mondal	69,070	42.65	▼4.78
BJP	Prafulla Chandra Sarkar	8,514	5.26	
Independent	Pradip Kumar Sarkar	2,592		
SUCI(C)	Gautam Sarkar	2,186		
BSP	Kamal Chandra Sarkar	1,921		
CPI(ML)L	Manabendra Roy	1,695		
Independent	Partha Biswas	1,309		
Majority		5,584	3.45	
Turnout		161,941	86.66	
INC gain from CPI(M)		Swing	▲12.22	

.# Swing based on Congress+Trinamool Congress vote percentages taken together in 2006.

=== 2006 ===
In the 2006 and 2001 state assembly elections Sadhu Tudu of CPI(M) won the Gazole (ST) assembly seat defeating his nearest rivals Jatin Hansda of Congress and Nabakumar Hembrom of Trinamool Congress respectively. Contests in most years were multi cornered but only winners and runners are being mentioned. Debnath Murmu of CPI(M) defeated Benjamin Hembrom of Congress in 1996 and Nabakumar Hembram of Congress in 1991. Suphal Murmu of CPI(M) defeated Nabakumar Hembram of Congress in 1987, Benjamin Hembram of Congress in 1982, and Shyan Murmu of Janata Party in 1977.

=== 1972 ===
Benjamin Hembram of Congress won in 1972. Suphal Murmu of CPI(M) won in 1971. Lakshan Saren of Congress won in 1969. D. Murmu of Congress won in 1967. The Gazole seat did not exist in 1962 and 1957. In independent India's first election in 1951 Dharanidhar Sarkar of CPI won the Gazole seat.
