= Abdul Mannan (West Bengal politician) =

Indian politician

Leader of the Opposition in West Bengal
- In office 2 June 2016 – 2 May 2021
- Governor: Keshari Nath Tripathi; Jagdeep Dhankhar
- Deputy: Nepal Mahata
- Chief Minister: Mamata Banerjee
- Preceded by: Surjya Kanta Mishra
- Succeeded by: Suvendu Adhikari

Member of the West Bengal Legislative Assembly
- In office 19 May 2016 – 2 May 2021
- Preceded by: Muzaffar Khan
- Succeeded by: Arindam Guin
- Constituency: Champdani
- In office 19 June 1991 – 11 May 2006
- Preceded by: Jibesh Chakrabarty
- Succeeded by: Sunil Sarkar
- Constituency: Champdani

Personal details
- Born: 3 June 1952 (age 74)
- Party: Indian National Congress

Abdul Mannan is an Indian politician who was the Leader of the Opposition belonging to the Indian National Congress in the West Bengal Legislative Assembly.

On 7 February 2017, Mannan was seriously injured in a fight over a property damage bill in the Assembly. Mannan protested the law, which would jail criminals for vandalism for 7 years, using placards. He was asked to stop but refused, after which he was suspended. He then sat in the Well of the House in protest, which led to a confrontation between police trying to remove him and fellow Congress MLAs, leading to Mannan being seriously injured. Two days later, Mannan complained of suffocation and chest pains during an Assembly meeting, leading him to get a temporary pacemaker implanted another two days later.

Mannan was defeated by TMC candidate Arindam Guin in the 2021 Legislative Assembly election.

Political offices
Preceded by Surjya Kanta Mishra	Leader of the Opposition in the West Bengal Legislative Assembly; 2016–2021	Succeeded by Suvendu Adhikari
State Legislative Assembly
Preceded by Sunil Sarkar	Member of the West Bengal Legislative Assembly from Champdani Assembly constituency 1991 – 2011	Succeeded by Jibesh Chakrabarty
Preceded by Muzaffar Khan	Member of the West Bengal Legislative Assembly from Champdani Assembly constituency 2016 – 2021	Succeeded by Arindam Guin
