= All Bengal Teachers Association =

Trade union of teachers in India

- নিখিল বঙ্গ শিক্ষক সমিতি
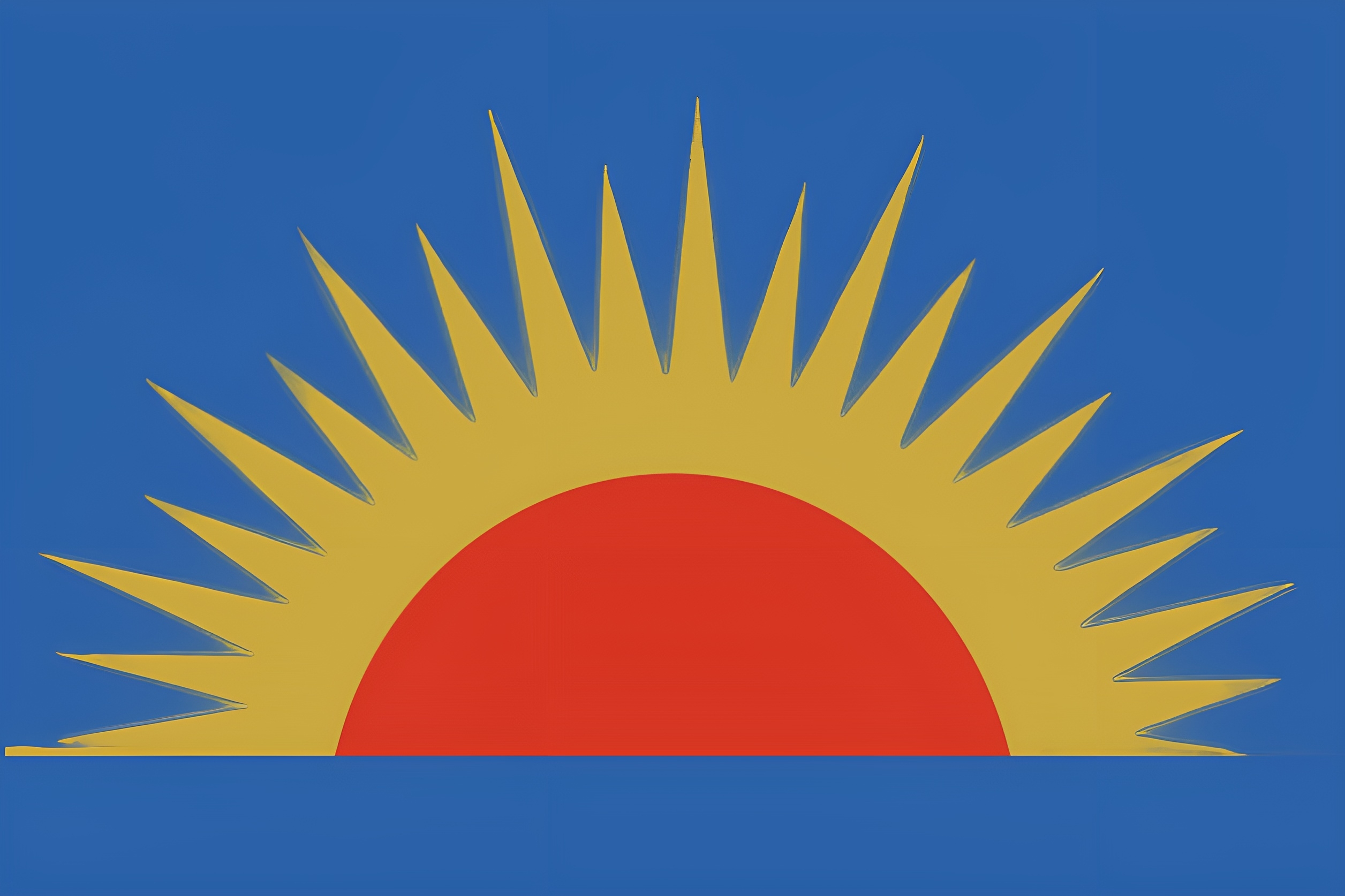

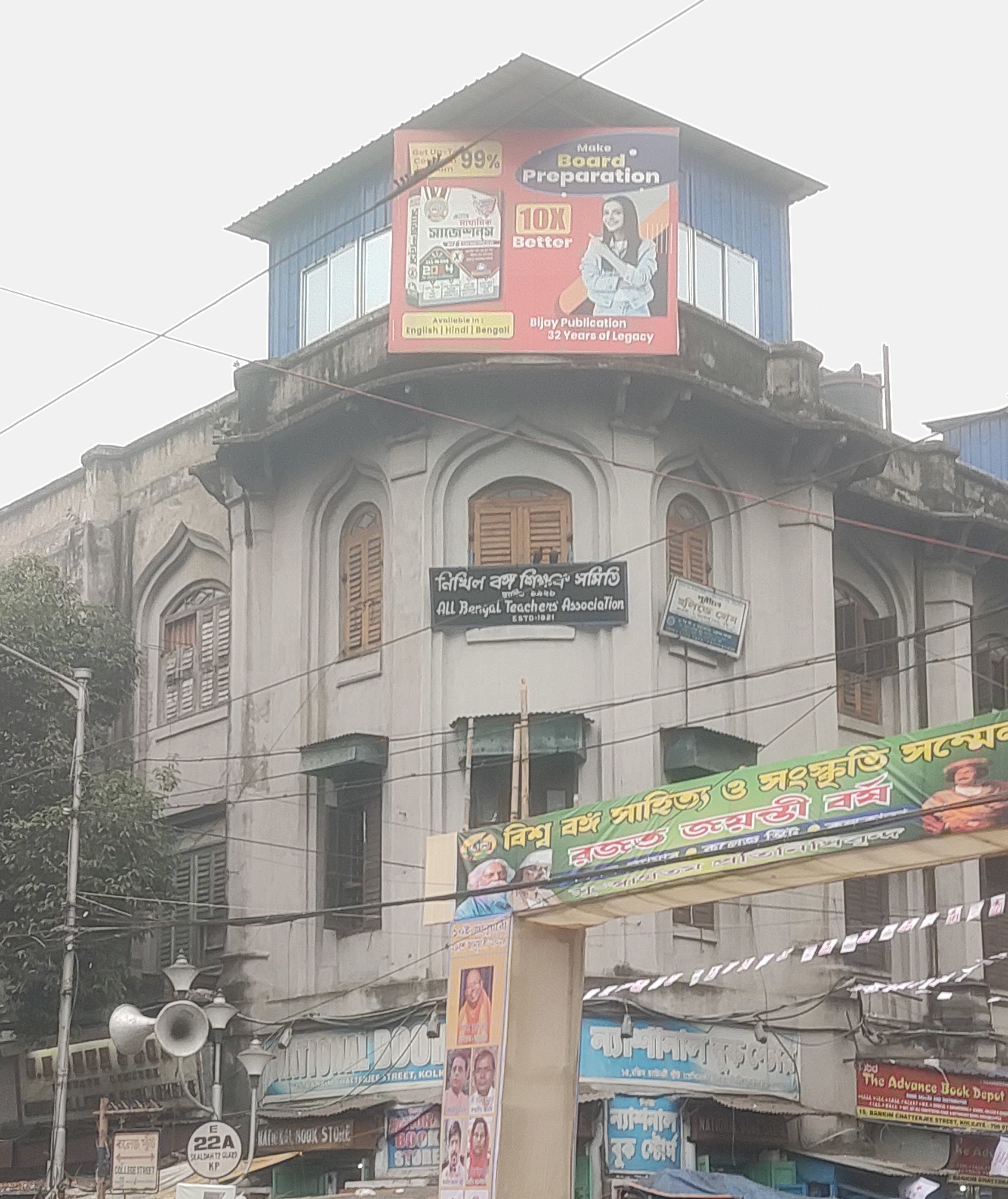
- Abbreviation: ABTA
- Formation: February 6, 1921; 105 years ago
- Founder: Acharya Prafulla Chandra Roy
- Legal status: Active
- Headquarters: P14, Ganesh Chandra Avenue, Calcutta-700013.
- Region served: West Bengal
- President: Krishna Prosanna Bhattacharya
- General Secretary: Sukumar Pain
- Website: www.abta-satyapriya.org

The All Bengal Teachers Association (ABTA) is a trade union of teachers in Indian state of West Bengal.

== History ==
ABTA was founded under the leadership of Acharya Prafulla Chandra Roy on 6 February 1921. It was the first such association of teachers in Asia.

Following the independence of India, ABTA's structure was reformed in 1952. The union also underwent several splits, with the Headmasters' Association and the West Bengal Teachers' Association being the first to leave the union.

Satyapriya Roy was its general secretary from 1953 to 1964.

In early 2022, ABTA protested an alleged plan by the government of West Bengal to run education in the state as a public–private partnership.
