= Manodeb Sinha =

Indian politician

Member of the West Bengal Legislative Assembly
- In office 2016–2021
- Constituency: Karandighi (Vidhan Sabha constituency)

Personal details
- Born: 7 October
- Party: All India Trinamool Congress
- Children: Saikat Sinha
- Occupation: Politician
- Profession: Teacher

Manodeb Sinha is an Indian Politician from the state of West Bengal. He is a member of the West Bengal Legislative Assembly.

== Career ==
He is a member of All India Trinamool Congress. He represents the Karandighi (Vidhan Sabha constituency).
