= Garbeta Assembly constituency =

Garbeta
- Constituency No. 233 for the West Bengal Legislative Assembly
- Interactive Map Outlining Garbeta Assembly Constituency

Constituency details
- Country: India
- Region: East India
- State: West Bengal
- District: Paschim Medinipur
- Lok Sabha constituency: Jhargram
- Established: 1951
- Total electors: 176,760
- Reservation: None

Member of Legislative Assembly
- 18th West Bengal Legislative Assembly
- Incumbent Pradip Lodha
- Party: BJP
- Alliance: NDA
- Elected year: 2026

Garbeta Assembly constituency is an assembly constituency in Paschim Medinipur district in the Indian state of West Bengal.

== Overview ==
As per orders of the Delimitation Commission of India, No. 233 Garbeta Assembly constituency is composed of the following: Garhbeta I community development block, and Amlasuli, Makli, Patharpara, Sarabot Jogardanga, Piyasala and Sarboth gram panchayats of Garhbeta II community development block.

Garbeta Assembly constituency is part of No. 33 Jhargram (Lok Sabha constituency) (ST).

== Members of the Legislative Assembly ==
Election Year	Name of M.L.A.	Party
1952	Saroj Roy	Communist Party of India
1957	Tushar Tudu	Indian National Congress
1957	Saroj Roy	Communist Party of India
1962	Tushar Tudu	Indian National Congress
1967	K. K. Chalak	Indian National Congress
1969	Krishna Prasad Duley	Bangla Congress
1971	Krishna Prasad Duley	Communist Party of India
1972	Krishna Prasad Duley	Communist Party of India
1977	Suvendu Mandal	Communist Party of India
1982	Suvendu Mandal	Communist Party of India
1987	Susanta Ghosh	Communist Party of India
1991	Susanta Ghosh	Communist Party of India
1996	Susanta Ghosh	Communist Party of India
2001	Susanta Ghosh	Communist Party of India
2006	Susanta Ghosh	Communist Party of India
2011	Susanta Ghosh	Communist Party of India
2016	Asish Chakraborty	Trinamool Congress
2021	Uttara Singha	Trinamool Congress
2026	Pradip Lodha	Bharatiya Janata Party

== Election results ==
=== 2026 ===
2026 West Bengal Legislative Assembly election: Garbeta
Party	Candidate	Votes	%	±%
BJP	Pradip Lodha	113,752	51.23	+10.61
AITC	Uttara Singha	87,527	39.42	−6.29
CPI(M)	Ghosh Tapan Kumar	14,238	6.41	−4.68
NOTA	None of the above	2,455	1.11	−0.2
Majority		26,225	11.81	+6.72
Turnout		222,049	95.03	+5.53
BJP hold		Swing		

=== 2021 ===
In the 2021 elections, Uttara Singha (Hazra) of AITC defeated her nearest rival, Madan Ruidas of BJP.

2021 West Bengal Legislative Assembly election: Garbeta
Party	Candidate	Votes	%	±%
AITC	Uttara Singha	94,928	45.71	
BJP	Madan Ruidas	84,356	40.62	
CPI(M)	Tapan Kumar Ghosh	23,042	11.09	
NOTA	None of the above	2,719	1.31	
Majority		10,572	5.09	
Turnout		207,681	89.5	
AITC hold		Swing		

=== 2016 ===
In the 2016 elections, Asish Chakraborty of All India Trinamool Congress defeated his nearest rival Sorforoj Khan of CPI(M).

West Bengal assembly elections, 2016: Garbeta
Party	Candidate	Votes	%	±%
AITC	Asish Chakraborty	110,501	59.90	+59.90
CPI(M)	Sorforaj Khan	49,344	26.80	−26.03
BJP	Pradip Lodha	22,525	12.20	+7.51
SUCI(C)	Tapas Kumar Mishra	1,998	4.69	+1.10
Majority		61,157	33.2	
Turnout		184,368	90.9	
AITC gain from CPI(M)		Swing		

.# Swing calculated on LF+Congress vote percentages taken together in 2016.

=== 2011 ===
In the 2011 elections, Sushanta Ghosh of CPI(M) defeated his nearest rival Hema Choubey of Congress.

West Bengal assembly elections, 2011: Garbeta
Party	Candidate	Votes	%	±%
CPI(M)	Sushanta Ghosh	86,047	52.23	−17.57
INC	Hema Choubey	70,977	43.08	+12.88#
BJP	Tarak Nath Gan	7,733	4.69	
Turnout		164,757	93.21	
CPI(M) hold		Swing	-30.45#	

.# Swing calculated on Congress+Trinamool Congress vote percentages taken together in 2006. Between 1967 and 2006 Garbeta had two seats – Garbeta East and Garbeta West.

=== 2006 ===
In 2006, 2001, 1996, 1991 and 1987 state assembly elections, Krishna Prasad Duley of CPI(M) won the 221 Garbeta West (SC) assembly seat defeating Tapas Saha of BJP in 2006, Kalipada Duley of BJP in 2001, Siddhartha Bisai of Congress in 1996, and Kinkar Ruidas of Congress in 1991 and 1987. Contests in most years were multi cornered but only winners and runners are being mentioned. Anadi Malla of CPI(M) defeated Madan Mohan Guria of Congress in 1982. Santosh Bisui of CPI(M) defeated Krishna Prasad Duley of CPI in 1977.

=== 1972 ===
Saroj Roy of CPI won in 1972, 1971 and 1969. P.Sinha Roy of Congress won in 1967.

=== 1957 ===
Bijoy Gopal Goswami (fl. 1952–1957) was an Indian politician who served as a Member of the West Bengal Legislative Assembly. Representing the 90-Salbani, Midnapore Constituency, he was elected during the 1952 West Bengal Legislative Assembly election, the first legislative election in independent India.

Hailing from Village Bankati, P.O. Hoomgarh, in the Garhbeta region of Midnapore district, Goswami officially took his oath of office as a Member of the Legislative Assembly (MLA) on June 18, 1952. He continued to serve in this capacity until April 5, 1957, when the legislative term ended with the dissolution of the assembly.

In addition to his contributions to Indian politics, Bijoy Gopal Goswami's legacy continues through his family. His son pursued a career in engineering and became a civil engineer, contributing to the country's infrastructure development.

This information is preserved in official records issued by the West Bengal Legislative Assembly, confirming Goswami's tenure and contributions during the formative years of India's democratic governance. .
