= Aroop Biswas =

Indian politician (born 1964)

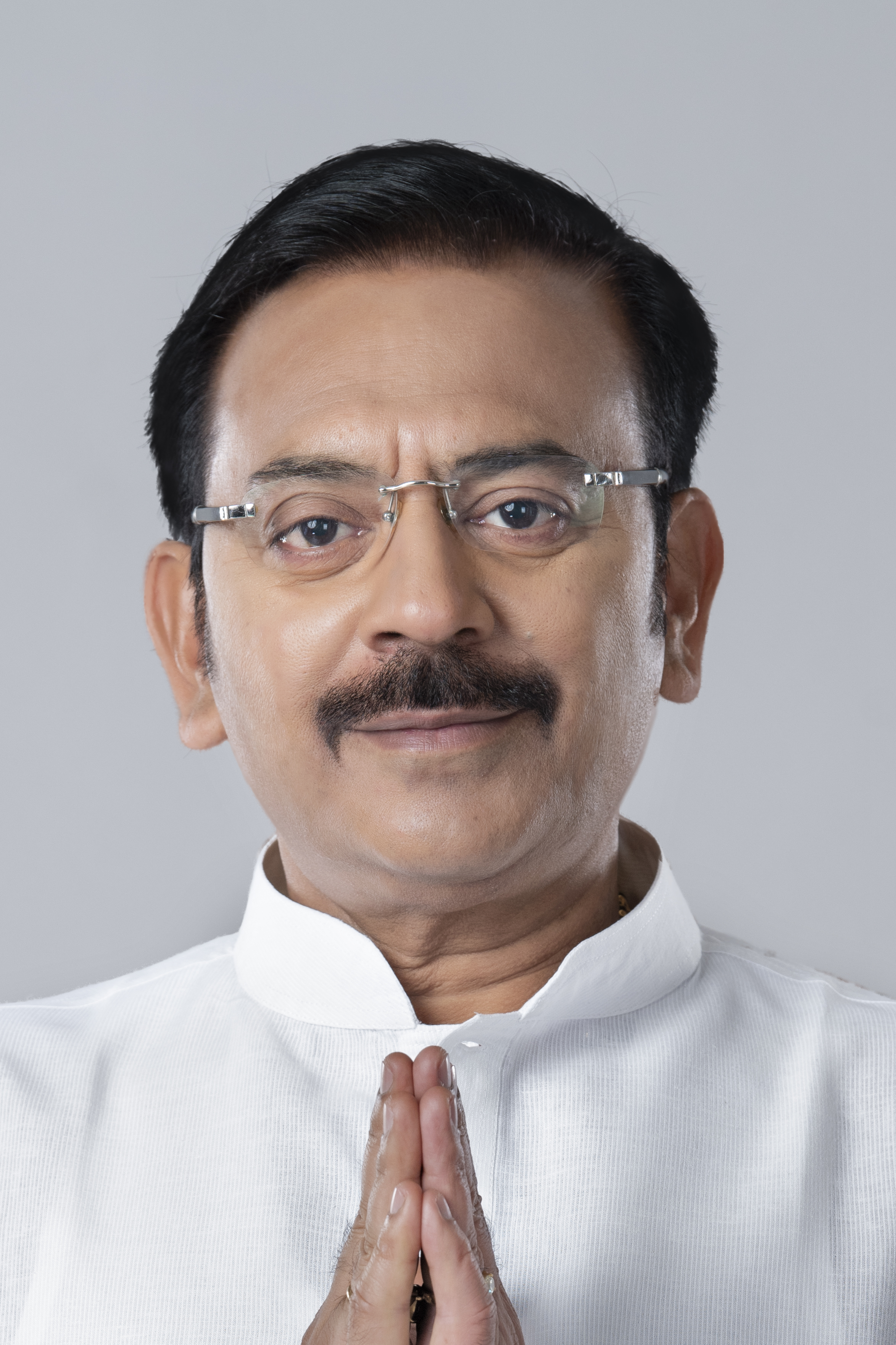

Cabinet Minister, Government of West Bengal
- In office 18 November 2015 – 4 May 2026
- Governor: Keshari Nath Tripathi; Jagdeep Dhankhar; La. Ganesan (additional charge); C. V. Ananda Bose
- Chief Minister: Mamata Banerjee
- Ministry and Departments: Power & Non Conventional Energy; Housing
- Preceded by: Madan Mitra; Sovandeb Chattopadhyay
- Succeeded by: Mamata Banerjee (Sports & Youth Affairs) (until December 2025)
- Governor: Jagdeep Dhankhar
- Chief Minister: Mamata Banerjee
- In office 20 May 2011 – 9 May 2021
- Governor: Keshari Nath Tripathi; Jagdeep Dhankhar
- Ministry and Departments: Public Works Department
- Preceded by: Kshiti Goswami
- Succeeded by: Moloy Ghatak

Member of the West Bengal Legislative Assembly
- In office 11 May 2006 – 4 May 2026
- Preceded by: Pankaj Kumar Banerjee
- Succeeded by: Papiya Adhikari
- Constituency: Tollyganj

Chairman of Borough X, Kolkata Municipal Corporation
- In office 8 June 2000 – 19 May 2010
- Preceded by: Sanjoy Banerjee
- Succeeded by: Amitava Banerjee
- Constituency: Ward No. 81

Personal details
- Born: 5 October 1964 (age 62)
- Party: Trinamool Congress
- Other political affiliations: Chhatra Parishad
- Education: New Alipore College (B.Com)

Aroop Biswas (born 5 October 1964) is an Indian politician who served as the minister for Power, and Housing in the Government of West Bengal. He is a member of the National Working Committee of All India Trinamool Congress. He was also an MLA, elected from the Tollyganj in the 2006, 2011, 2016 and 2021 West Bengal Legislative Assembly election. He is the owner of Suruchi Sangha.
