= Dilip Singh (West Bengal politician) =

Indian politician (born 1976)

Dilip Singh (born 1976) is an Indian politician from West Bengal. He is a member of the West Bengal Legislative Assembly from the Champdani Assembly constituency in Hooghly district representing the Bharatiya Janata Party.

== Early life and education ==
Singh is from Chanditala, Hooghly district, West Bengal. He is the son of Ramadhar Singh. He studied till Class 10 at H.S School Babusarai and passed the examinations conducted by Uttar Pradesh Board, Varanasi in 1989. He runs his own business. He declared assets worth, Rs.2 crore in 2021 and Rs.3 crore in 2026, in his affidavits to the Election Commission of India.

== Career ==
Singh won the Champdani Assembly constituency representing the Bharatiya Janata Party in the 2026 West Bengal Legislative Assembly election. He polled 93,704 votes and defeated his nearest rival and sitting MLA, Arindam Guin of the All India Trinamool Congress, by a margin of 3,026 votes. Guin, who was also a former chairman of Baidyabati Municipality, won the Champdani seat for Trinamool Congress in the 2021 West Bengal Legislative Assembly election, defeating Dilip Singh of BJP, by 30,078 votes.
