= Chunchura Assembly constituency =

Chunchura
- Constituency No. 190 for the West Bengal Legislative Assembly
- Interactive Map Outlining Chunchura Assembly Constituency

Constituency details
- Country: India
- Region: East India
- State: West Bengal
- District: Hooghly
- Lok Sabha constituency: Hooghly
- Established: 1951
- Total electors: 262,555
- Reservation: None

Member of Legislative Assembly
- 18th West Bengal Legislative Assembly
- Incumbent Subir Nag
- Party: BJP
- Alliance: NDA
- Elected year: 2026

Chunchura Assembly constituency is an assembly constituency in Hooghly district in the Indian state of West Bengal.

== Overview ==
As per orders of the Delimitation Commission, No. 190 Chunchura Assembly constituency is composed of the following: Hooghly Chinsurah Municipality and Bandel, Debanandapur, Kodalia I and Kodalia II gram panchayats of Chinsurah Mogra community development block and Polba, Rajhat and Sugandha gram panchayats of Polba Dadpur community development block.

Chunchura Assembly constituency is part of No. 28 Hooghly Lok Sabha constituency.

== Members of the Legislative Assembly ==
Year	Name	Party
1951	Jyotish Chandra Ghosh	All India Forward Bloc (MG)
1951	Radha Nath Das	Indian National Congress
1957	Bhupati Majumdar	Indian National Congress
1962	Sambhu Charan Ghosh	All India Forward Bloc
1967	Sambhu Charan Ghosh	All India Forward Bloc
1969	Sambhu Charan Ghosh	All India Forward Bloc
1971	Bhupati Majumdar	Indian National Congress
1972	Bhupati Majumdar	Indian National Congress
1973^	Chandra Kumar Dey	Independent politician
1977	Sambhu Charan Ghosh	All India Forward Bloc
1982	Sambhu Charan Ghosh	All India Forward Bloc
1987	Naren Dey	All India Forward Bloc
1991	Naren Dey	All India Forward Bloc
1996	Naren Dey	All India Forward Bloc
2001	Naren Dey	All India Forward Bloc
2006	Naren Dey	All India Forward Bloc
2011	Asit Mazumdar	Trinamool Congress
2016	Asit Mazumdar	Trinamool Congress
2021	Asit Mazumdar	Trinamool Congress
2026	Subir Nag	Bharatiya Janata Party

== Election results ==
=== 2026 ===
2026 West Bengal Legislative Assembly election: Chunchura
Party	Candidate	Votes	%	±%
BJP	Subir Nag	137,704	53.96	▲15.22
AITC	Debangshu Bhattacharya	94,269	36.94	▼9.03
AIFB	Sunil Saha	14,226	5.57	▼5.73
NOTA	None of the above	3,015	1.18	▼0.52
INC	Moinul Haque	2,411	0.94	New entry
Majority		43,435	17.02	▲9.79
Turnout		255,204	92.38	▲11.32
BJP gain from AITC		Swing		

=== 2021 ===
2021 West Bengal Legislative Assembly election: Chunchura
Party	Candidate	Votes	%	±%
AITC	Asit Mazumdar	117,104	45.97	▼3.09
BJP	Locket Chatterjee	98,687	38.74	▲28.34
AIFB	Pranab Kumar Ghosh	28,777	11.3	▼25.47
NOTA	None of the above	4,338	1.7	▼0.62
Majority		18,417	7.23	▼5.06
Turnout		254,737	81.06	▼0.89
AITC hold		Swing		

=== 2016 ===
2016 West Bengal Legislative Assembly election: Chunchura
Party	Candidate	Votes	%	±%
AITC	Asit Mazumdar	118,501	49.06	▼7.84
AIFB	Pranab Kumar Ghosh	88,817	36.77	▼0.18
BJP	Champa Chakraborty	25,120	10.40	▲7.82
NOTA	None of the Above	5,603	2.32	New entry
SUCI(C)	Paban Mazumder	2,208	0.91	New entry
Independent	Deb Kanta Sikdar	1,289	0.53	New entry
Majority		29,684	12.29	▼7.66
Turnout		2,41,538	81.95	▼2.78
AITC hold		Swing		

=== 2011 ===
2011 West Bengal Legislative Assembly election: Chunchura
Party	Candidate	Votes	%	±%
AITC	Asit Mazumdar	127,206	56.90	
AIFB	Naren Dey	82,614	42.18	
BJP	Champa Chakraborty	5,761	2.58	
Independent	Sajal Samaddar	2,860	1.28	
BSP	Surya Kanta Ray	2,550	1.14	
PDS	Arindam Chakraborty	1,533	0.69	
JDP	Lakshmi Ram Saren	1,042	0.47	
Majority		44,592	19.95	
Turnout		2,23,566	84.73	
AITC gain from AIFB		Swing		

=== 1977-2006 ===
In the 2006, 2001, 1996, 1991 and 1987 state assembly elections Naren Dey Forward Bloc won the Chinsurah assembly seat defeating his nearest rivals Ashis Sen of Trinamool Congress in 2006, Robin Mukherjee of Trinamool Congress in 2001, Tapan Dasgupta of Congress in 1996 and 1991, and Chandra Kumar Dey of Congress in 1987. Sambhu Charan Ghosh of Forward Bloc defeated Rabin Mukherjee of Congress in 1982 and Chandra Kumar Dey of Congress in 1977.

=== 1952-1972 ===
Bhupati Majumdar of Congress won in 1972 and 1971. Sambhu Charan Ghosh of Forward Bloc won in 1969, 1967 and 1962. Bhupati Majumdar of Congress won in 1957. In independent India's first election in 1951 Jyotish Chandra Ghosh of Forward Bloc (MG) and Radha Nath Das of Congress won the Chinsurah double seat.
