= Asish Chakraborty =

Indian politician

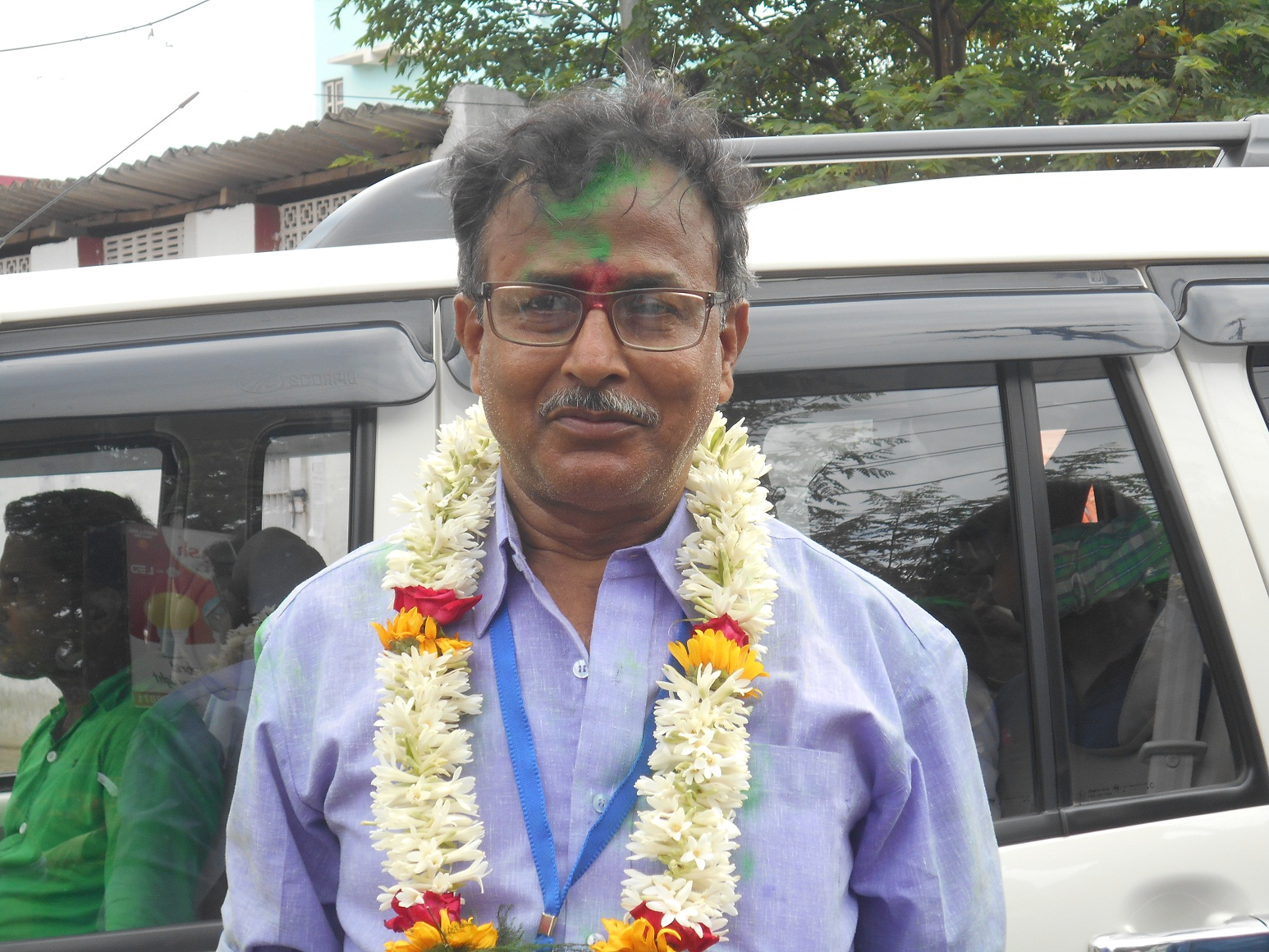
Asish Chakraborty (Nanti) after winning, 2016

Asish Chakraborty (আশীষ চক্রবর্ত্তী), also known as Nanti da, is an Indian politician from Paschim Medinipur, West Bengal, India.

He is a Member of Legislative Assembly (M.L.A.) from No. 233 Garbeta (Vidhan Sabha constituency), West Bengal. He was elected as an All India Trinamool Congress candidate from Garbeta in the 2016 Assembly election.

He is Paschim Medinipur District Working President (জেলা কার্যকারী সভাপতি) of the All India Trinamool Congress.

He is Vice President of District Sports Association, Midnapore.

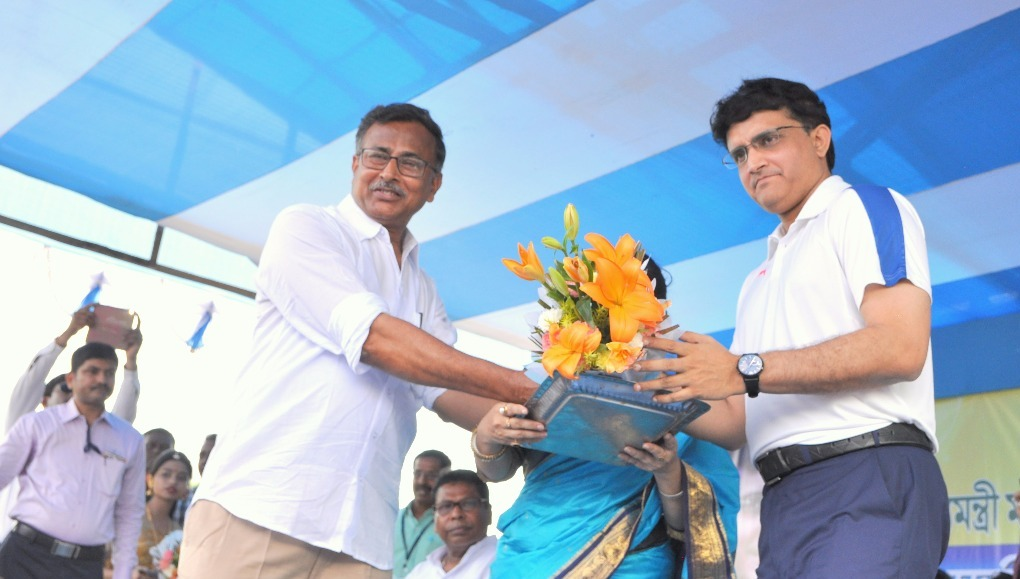
Asish Chakraborty with Sourav Ganguly

== Assembly election 2016 ==
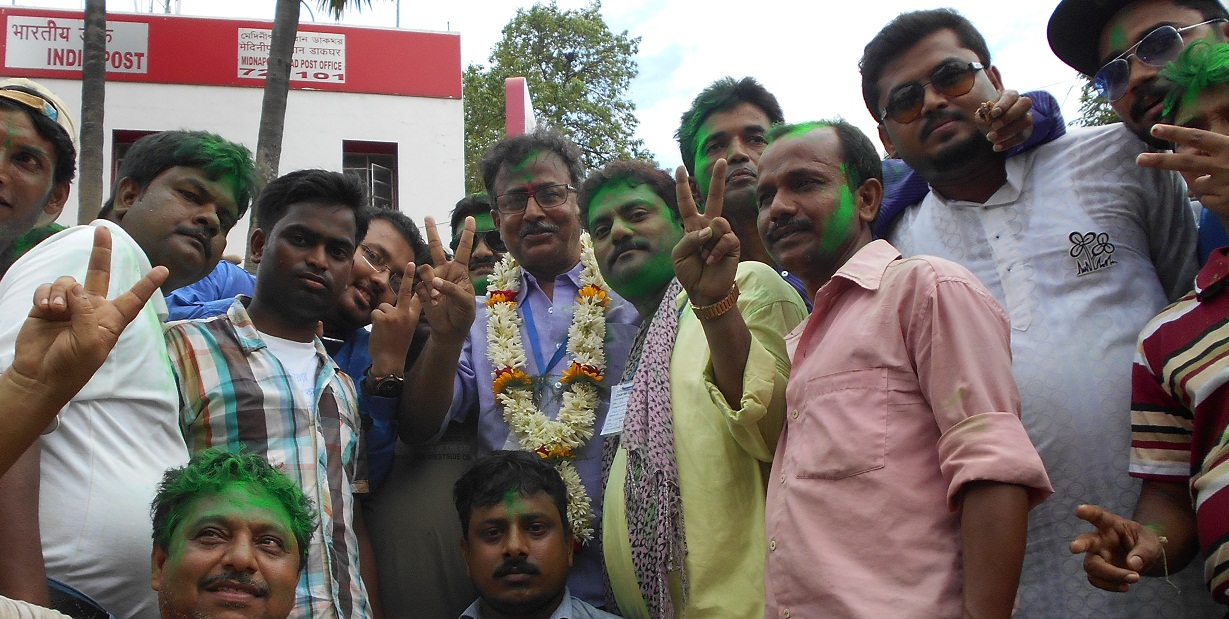
Celebrating his victory with party supporters

In the 2016 elections, Asish Chakraborty of All India Trinamool Congress defeated his nearest rival Sorforoj Khan of CPI(M) by 61,157 votes.

West Bengal assembly elections, 2016: Garbeta
Party	Candidate	Votes
AITMC	ASHIS CHAKRABORTY (NANTI)	110,501
CPI(M)	SORFORAJ KHAN	49,344
BJP	PRADIP LODHA	22,525
SUCI	TAPAS MISHRA	1,998
NOTA		3,367

== See also ==
- Mamata Banerjee
- Suvendu Adhikari
- All India Trinamool Congress
- Garbeta (Vidhan Sabha constituency)
- 2016 West Bengal Legislative Assembly election
