= Tollygunj Assembly constituency =

West Bengal Legislative Assembly constituency

Tollygunge
- Constituency No. 152 for the West Bengal Legislative Assembly
- Interactive Map Outlining Tollygunge Assembly Constituency

Constituency details
- Country: India
- Region: East India
- State: West Bengal
- District: Kolkata
- Lok Sabha constituency: Jadavpur
- Established: 1951
- Total electors: 269,582
- Reservation: None

Member of Legislative Assembly
- 18th West Bengal Legislative Assembly
- Incumbent Papiya Adhikari
- Party: Bharatiya Janata Party
- Elected year: 2026

Tollygunge Assembly constituency is a Legislative Assembly constituency of Kolkata district in the Indian state of West Bengal.

Most Successful parties from Tollygunge Assembly Constituency Since 1957
1. Communist Party of India (Marxist) (7 times) (41.2%)
2. Trinamool Congress (5 times) (29.4%)
3. Indian National Congress (2 times) (11.8%)
4. Communist Party of India (1 time) (5.88%)
5. Praja Socialist Party (1 time) (5.88%)
6. Bharatiya Janata Party (1 time) (5.88%)

== Overview ==
As per order of the Delimitation Commission in respect of the Delimitation of constituencies in the West Bengal, Tollygunge Assembly constituency is composed of the following:

- Ward Nos. 94, 95, 97, 98, 100, 111, 112, 113 and 114 of Kolkata Municipal Corporation.

Earlier, before 2011,Tollygunge assembly constituency was consist of Ward Nos. 81, 89, 94, 95, 97, 98 of Kolkata Municipal Corporation.

Borough	Ward No.	Councillor	2021 Winner
X	94	Sandip Nandi Majumdar	Trinamool Congress
X	95	Tapan Dasgupta	Trinamool Congress
X	97	Debabrata Majumdar	Trinamool Congress
X	98	Arup Chakraborty	Trinamool Congress
X	100	Prosenjit Das	Trinamool Congress
XI	111	Sandip Das	Trinamool Congress
XI	112	Gopal Roy	Trinamool Congress
XI	113	Anita Kar Majumdar Sil	Trinamool Congress
XI	114	Biswajit Mandal	Trinamool Congress

Tollygunge Assembly constituency is part of No. 22 Jadavpur Lok Sabha constituency.

== Members of the Legislative Assembly ==
Year	Member	Party
1952	Priya Ranjan Sen (Tollygunge Uttar) (Consists Ward No. 89,94,97)	Indian National Congress
1952	Ambika Chakrabarty (Tollygunge Dakshin) (Consists Ward No. 98,99,100)	Communist Party of India
1957	Haridas Mitra	Praja Socialist Party
1962	Niranjan Sengupta	Communist Party of India
1967	Niranjan Sengupta	Communist Party of India (Marxist)
1969	Niranjan Sengupta	Communist Party of India (Marxist)
1969^	Satyapriya Roy	Communist Party of India (Marxist)
1971	Satyapriya Roy	Communist Party of India (Marxist)
1972	Pankaj Kumar Banerjee	Indian National Congress
1977	Prasanta Sur	Communist Party of India (Marxist)
1982	Prasanta Sur	Communist Party of India (Marxist)
1987	Prasanta Sur	Communist Party of India (Marxist)
1991	Prasanta Sur	Communist Party of India (Marxist)
1996	Pankaj Kumar Banerjee	Indian National Congress
2001	Pankaj Kumar Banerjee	Trinamool Congress
2006	Aroop Biswas	Trinamool Congress
2011	Aroop Biswas	Trinamool Congress
2016	Aroop Biswas	Trinamool Congress
2021	Aroop Biswas	Trinamool Congress
2026	Papiya Adhikari	Bharatiya Janata Party

^ indicates by election

== Election results ==
=== 2026 ===
2026 West Bengal Legislative Assembly election: Tollygunj
Party	Candidate	Votes	%	±%
BJP	Papiya Adhikari	88,407	42.99	▲16.97
AITC	Aroop Biswas	82,394	40.06	▼11.34
CPI(M)	Dr. Partha Pratim Biswas	30,335	14.75	▼5.82
INC	Manas Sinha Roy	1,066	0.52	
SUCI(C)	Sumita Banerjee	292	0.14	▼0.09
NOTA	None of the above	1,501	0.73	▼
Majority		6013		
Turnout		205661		
BJP gain from AITC		Swing		

=== 2021 election ===
2021 West Bengal Legislative Assembly election: Tollyganj
Party	Candidate	Votes	%	±%
AITC	Aroop Biswas	101,440	51.4	+4.65
BJP	Babul Supriyo	51,360	26.02	+18.36
CPI(M)	Debdut Ghosh	40,597	20.57	−21.01
NOTA	None of the above	2,310	1.17	
SUCI(C)	Debabrata Bera	454	0.23	
Majority		50,080	25.64	
Turnout		1,97,642	73.28	
AITC hold		Swing		

=== 2016 election ===
2016 West Bengal Legislative Assembly election: Tollyganj
Party	Candidate	Votes	%	±%
AITC	Aroop Biswas	90,603	46.75	−9.42
CPI(M)	Madhuja Sen Roy	80,707	41.58	+0.54
BJP	Mohan Rao	14,835	7.66	
NOTA	None of the above	3719	1.92	
IND	Dr. Dipankar Sarkar	1,627	0.84	
Majority		9,896	5.10	
Turnout		1,94,165	75.34	
AITC hold		Swing	12.18#	

.# Swing calculated on Left Front+Congress vote percentages taken together in 2016.

=== 2011 ===
In the 2011 election, Aroop Biswas defeated his nearest rival Partha Pratim Biswas of CPI(M).

2011 West Bengal Legislative Assembly election: Tollyganj
Party	Candidate	Votes	%	±%
AITC	Aroop Biswas	1,02,743	56.17	+9.50
CPI(M)	Dr. Partha Pratim Biswas	75,073	41.04	−5.10
BJP	Bibekananda Sinha Roy	2,931	1.60	
IND	Debashis Das	959	0.52	
IND	Koyel Basu Thakur	765	0.42	
Majority		27,670	15.13	
Turnout		1,83,026	78.08	
AITC hold		Swing	12.18#	

.# Swing calculated on Congress+Trinamool Congress vote percentages taken together in 2011.

=== 2006 ===
In the 2006 election, Aroop Biswas of Trinamool Congress defeated his nearest rival Partha Pratim Biswas of CPI(M).

West Bengal assembly elections, 2006: Tollygunge constituency
Party	Candidate	Votes	%	±%
AITC	Aroop Biswas	46,378	46.67	+0.07
CPI(M)	Dr. Partha Pratim Biswas	45,852	46.14	+5.10
INC	Tulsidas Mukherjee	5,984	6.00	
Independent	Dilip Shil	1154	1.20	
Majority		526	(0.5%)	
Turnout		99,375	(69.3%)	
AITC hold		Swing		

.# Swing calculated on Trinamool Congress+BJP vote percentages taken together in 2006.

=== 2001 ===
In the 2001 election, Pankaj Kumar Banerjee defeated his nearest rival Goutam Banerjee of CPI(M).

West Bengal assembly elections, 2001: Tollygunge constituency
Party	Candidate	Votes	%	±%
AITC	Pankaj Kumar Banerjee	50,424	49.74	+1.55
CPI(M)	Goutam Banerjee	44,593	44.25	
BJP	Keshab Saha	3,683	1.60	
PDS	Dr. Sudeshna Choudhury	934		
Independent	Amit Acharjee	283		
Independent	Gopal Ganguly	279		
Turnout		182,917	78.71	
AITC gain from INC		Swing	12.18#	

.# Swing calculated on Congress+Trinamool Congress vote percentages taken together in 2001.

=== 1996 ===
In the 1996 election, Pankaj Kumar Banerjee of Congress defeated his nearest rival Ashis Roy of CPI(M).

West Bengal state assembly election, 1996: Tollygunge constituency
Party	Candidate	Votes	%	±%
INC	Pankaj Kumar Banerjee	53,871	48.19	
CPI(M)	Ashis Roy	51,189	45.79	
BJP	Gautam Biswas	6,451	5.77	
Independent	Ashis Banik	286	0,26	
Turnout		114,086	77.38	
INC gain from CPI(M)		Swing	12.18#	

=== 1991 ===
In the 1991 election, Prasanta Sur of CPIM defeated his nearest rival Pankaj Kumar Banerjee of Congress

West Bengal assembly elections, 1991: Tollygunge constituency
Party	Candidate	Votes	%	±%
CPI(M)	Prasanta Sur	42,706	44.18	
INC	Pankaj Kumar Banerjee	42,379	43.85	
BJP	Gautam Biswas	10,077	10.43	
Independent	Sachin Sen	1170	1,21	
Independent	Amal Dey	167	0,17	
Independent	Jalodhir Ranjan Das	156	0,16	
Turnout		182,917	78.71	
CPI(M) hold		Swing	12.18#	

=== 1987 ===
In the 1987 election, Prasanta Sur of CPIM defeated his nearest rival Pankaj Kumar Banerjee of Congress

West Bengal assembly elections, 1987: Tollygunge constituency
Party	Candidate	Votes	%	±%
CPI(M)	Prasanta Sur	45,497		
INC	Pankaj Kumar Banerjee	40,603		
Independent	Gurupada Sengupta	661		
Independent	Malay Sanyal	231		
Independent	Amitava Guha Thakurata	77		
Turnout		87,069	72.87	
CPI(M) hold		Swing	12.18#	

=== 1982 ===
In the 1982 election, Prasanta Sur of CPIM defeated his nearest rival Asim Datta of Congress

West Bengal assembly elections, 1982: Tollygunge constituency
Party	Candidate	Votes	%	±%
CPI(M)	Prasanta Sur	41,857	60.69	
INC	Asim Datta	24,294	35.23	
Independent	Debaprasad Chatterjee	2,536	3.68	
Independent	Maloy Sanyal	280	0.41	
Turnout		70,399	69.92	
CPI(M) hold		Swing		

=== 1977 ===
In the 1977 election, Prasanta Sur of CPIM defeated his nearest rival Pankaj Kumar Banerjee of Congress

West Bengal assembly elections, 1977: Tollygunge constituency
Party	Candidate	Votes	%	±%
CPI(M)	Prasanta Sur	26,905	49.43	
INC	Pankaj Kumar Banerjee	17,455	32.60	
JP	Sushil Kumar Basu	9,578	17.59	
Independent	Sajal Roy	502	0.92	
Turnout		54,446	56.35	
CPI(M) hold		Swing		

=== 1977-2006 ===
In the 2006 state assembly elections, Aroop Biswas of Trinamool Congress won the Tollyganj seat defeating his nearest rival Dr. Partha Pratim Biswas of CPI(M). Contests in most years were multi cornered but only winners and runners are being mentioned. Pankaj Kumar Banerjee of Trinamool Congress defeated Goutam Banerjee of CPI(M) in 2001, and Ashis Roy of CPI(M) in 1996 representing Congress. Prasanta Sur of CPI(M) defeated Pankaj Kumar Banerjee of Congress in 1991 and 1987, Asim Dutta of Congress in 1982, and Pankaj Kumar Banerjee of Congress in 1977.

=== 1952-1972 ===
Pankaj Kumar Banerjee of Congress, won in 1972 defeating Prasanta Sur of CPIM. Satya Priya Roy of CPI(M) won in 1971. Niranjan Sengupta of CPI(M)/CPI won in 1969, 1967 and 1962. Haridas Mitra of PSP won in 1957. In independent India's first election in 1952 Tollyganj had three seats. Priya Ranjan Sen of Congress won from Tollygunge Uttar Assembly constituency, Ambica Chakraborty of CPI won from Tollygunge Dakshin Assembly constituency and Jyotish Joarder an independent won from Tollyganj Assembly constituency.
