= Champdani Assembly constituency =

Assembly constituency in West Bengal, India

Champdani
- Constituency No. 187 for the West Bengal Legislative Assembly
- Interactive Map Outlining Champdani Assembly Constituency

Constituency details
- Country: India
- Region: East India
- State: West Bengal
- District: Hooghly
- Lok Sabha constituency: Sreerampur
- Established: 1967
- Total electors: 208,046
- Reservation: None

Member of Legislative Assembly
- 18th West Bengal Legislative Assembly
- Incumbent Dilip Singh
- Party: BJP
- Alliance: NDA
- Elected year: 2026

Champdani Assembly constituency is an assembly constituency in Hooghly district in the Indian state of West Bengal.

== Overview ==
As per orders of the Delimitation Commission, No. 187 Champdani Assembly constituency is composed of the following: Champdani Municipality, Baidyabati Municipality, Ward Nos. 1 & 2 and 20 to 24 of Sreerampur Municipality and Payarapur gram panchayat of Sreerampur-Uttarpara community development block.

The towns of Sheoraphuli and Baidyabati falls under this jurisdiction.

Champdani Assembly constituency is part of No. 27 Sreerampur Lok Sabha constituency.

== Members of the Legislative Assembly ==
Year	Name	Party
1967	Byomkesh Majumdar	Indian National Congress
1969	Haripada Mukherjee	Communist Party of India (Marxist)
1971	Haripada Mukherjee	Communist Party of India (Marxist)
1972	Girija Bhusan Mukhopadhyay	Communist Party of India
1977	Sailendra Nath Chattopadhyay	Communist Party of India (Marxist)
1982	Sailendra Nath Chattopadhyay	Communist Party of India (Marxist)
1987	Sunil Sarkar	Communist Party of India (Marxist)
1991	Abdul Mannan	Indian National Congress
1996	Abdul Mannan	Indian National Congress
2001	Abdul Mannan	Indian National Congress
2006	Jibesh Chakrabarty	Communist Party of India (Marxist)
2011	Muzaffar Khan	Trinamool Congress
2016	Abdul Mannan	Indian National Congress
2021	Arindam Guin	Trinamool Congress
2026	Dilip Singh	Bharatiya Janata Party

== Election results ==
=== 2026 ===
2026 West Bengal Legislative Assembly election: Champdani
Party	Candidate	Votes	%	±%
BJP	Dilip Singh	93,704	45.84	▲10.59
AITC	Arindam Guin	90,678	44.36	▼5.84
CPI(M)	Chandranath Banerjee	14,368	7.03	New entry
INC	Pritam Ghosh	1,975	0.97	▼10.6
NOTA	None of the above	2,027	0.99	▼0.67
Majority		3,026	1.48	▼13.47
Turnout		204,415	91.95	▲15.58
BJP gain from AITC		Swing		

=== 2021 ===
2021 West Bengal Legislative Assembly election: Champdani
Party	Candidate	Votes	%	±%
AITC	Arindam Guin	100,972	50.2	▲10.01
BJP	Dilip Singh	70,894	35.25	▲22.56
INC	Abdul Mannan	23,272	11.57	▼32.57
NOTA	None of the above	3,347	1.66	▼0.29
Majority		30,078	14.95	▲11.00
Turnout		201,131	76.37	▼0.47
AITC gain from INC		Swing		

=== 2016 ===
2016 West Bengal Legislative Assembly election: Champdani
Party	Candidate	Votes	%	±%
INC	Abdul Mannan	81,330	44.14	New entry
AITC	Muzaffar Khan	74,048	40.19	▼16.97
BJP	Raj Kumari Shaw	23,383	12.69	▲7.59
NOTA	None of the Above	3,602	1.95	New entry
SUCI(C)	Sima Chowdhuri	1,899	1.03	New entry
Majority		7,282	3.95	▼18.49
Turnout		1,84,262	76.84	▼0.45
INC gain from AITC		Swing		

=== 2011 ===
2011 West Bengal Legislative Assembly election: Champdani
Party	Candidate	Votes	%	±%
AITC	Muzaffar Khan	92,476	57.16	
CPI(M)	Jibesh Chakraborty	56,163	34.72	
BJP	Durga Verma	8,258	5.10	
Independent	Gour Chandra Dey	2,361	1.46	
JD(U)	Taharon Begum	1,668	1.03	
Independent	Goutam Pyne	851	0.53	
Majority		36,313	22.44	
Turnout		1,61,777	77.29	
AITC gain from CPI(M)		Swing		

=== 1977-2006 ===
In the 2006 state assembly elections, Jibesh Chakraborty of CPI(M) won the Champdani assembly seat defeating his nearest rival Abdul Mannan of Congress. Contests in most years were multi cornered but only winners and runners are being mentioned. Abdul Mannan of Congress defeated Kaji Abdul Hai of CPI(M) in 2001, and Sunil Sarkar of CPI(M) in 1996 and 1991. Sunil Sarkar of CPI(M) defeated Gouri Sankar Banerjee of Congress in 1987. Sailendra Nath Chattopadhyay of CPI(M) defeated Swaraj Mukhopadhyay of Congress in 1982 and Bibhas Chandra Ghosh of Janata Party in 1977.

=== 1967-1972 ===
Girija Bhushan Mukhopadhyay of CPI won in 1972. Haripada Mukherjee of CPI(M) won in 1971 and 1969. Byomkesh Majumdar of Congress won in 1967. Prior to that the Champdani seat did not exist.
