= Prabhabati Dasgupta =

Prabhabati Dasgupta (died January 1976) was an Indian trade unionist and labour activist in colonial Bengal. Among the few women active in Bengal's interwar trade union movement, she organised municipal sanitation workers in Calcutta and jute mill workers across the province. She played a leading role in the Calcutta sanitation workers' strikes of 1928 and the Bengal jute workers' general strike of 1929.

Born into an affluent Bengali family, Dasgupta studied in India, the United States and Germany, earning a doctorate from Heidelberg University in 1927. Her encounters with Indian revolutionaries and communists abroad drew her into anti-colonial politics and, upon returning to Calcutta, labour activism. In November 1927, she co-founded the All Bengal Scavengers' Union with Muzaffar Ahmad and Dharani Goswami of the Workers and Peasants Party, becoming its first president. Working closely with its predominantly Dalit membership in defiance of prevailing caste conventions, she became known as Dhangar-er Ma (Mother of Scavengers). Under her leadership, the union organised two major strikes in 1928 for higher wages and better working conditions.

In May 1929, Dasgupta became president of the Bengal Jute Workers' Union and helped lead a general strike across Bengal's jute mills that August, as more than 250,000 workers protested longer working hours without proportionate increases in pay and reductions in bonuses. However, her decision to negotiate a settlement with mill owners and call off the strike without consulting other union leaders brought her into conflict with the union's communist leadership and led to her expulsion. She subsequently helped establish the rival Bengal Jute Workers' Association, but following a series of unsuccessful strikes in the early 1930s and mounting financial difficulties, she withdrew from active labour politics.

Historians have situated Dasgupta among a generation of educated, upper-class Bengali women who challenged prevailing gender and caste conventions through political activism. Her approach to labour organisation has nevertheless been characterised as paternalistic, rooted more in humanitarian concern than class struggle. Dasgupta herself rejected the description of her activities as trade unionism, maintaining in a retrospective account that she had acted primarily out of humanitarian motives.

== Early life ==
Dasgupta was born into affluence to Tarakchandra Dasgupta, a judge, and Mohini Devi. K. C. Das, a noted Indian entrepreneur, was among her siblings. She studied at St. Paul’s College, Calcutta and completed an MA in psychology from the University of Calcutta in 1920. Later that year, she travelled to the United Kingdom for further study, before enrolling at the University of Michigan as a Barbour Scholar to study political science. However, she lost her scholarship after failing to devote sufficient attention to her studies because of her involvement in political work, and subsequently transferred to Columbia University. Dasgupta later travelled to Germany and in 1927, she received a PhD from Heidelberg University.

== Activism ==
=== USA ===
While studying in the United States, Dasgupta became acquainted with the Indian nationalist Taraknath Das and joined Freedom for India and Ireland, an organization advocating the causes of Indian and Irish independence; she held responsibility for publicity and propaganda. Later, in Germany, she encountered prominent expatriate Indian revolutionaries and communists, including Virendranath Chattopadhyaya and M. N. Roy, then leading members of the Communist International, and was inspired to return to Calcutta and take up labor activism.

=== All Bengal Scavengers' Union ===
Beginning in late 1927, Dasgupta became a regular visitor to the residence slums of the manual scavengers in Kolkata, whose members were overwhelmingly drawn from the Dalit castes and treated as untouchables. In the process, she socialized with them extensively, breaching caste norms, (Note: Sarkar notes that the "very sight of them [manual scavengers] polluted and produced acute physical revulsion" in upper-caste men and women.) and came to be known as "Dhangar-er Ma" (lit. Mother of Scavengers). In November, with aid from Muzaffar Ahmad and Dharani Goswami of the Workers and Peasants Party (WPP), she formed the All Bengal Scavengers' Union (ABSU) and became its inaugural president. While manual scavengers had engaged in collective action, as early as 1870s, ABSU taught them to raise funds for collective subsistence during strikes, not run afoul of technical illegalities, and articulate their demands in writing. Tanika Sarkar, a pre-eminent historian of colonial India, notes the Union, via their propaganda, to have "translated grievances into demands and demands into rights".

==== Scavengers' strikes (1928) ====
In late January 1928, ABSU dispatched a list of demands (Note: The demands included: recognition of ABSU; monthly remuneration of Ten Rupees; construction of well-ventilated houses with latrines; charging the workers rent in proportion to their income and conferring of voting rights; provision of free medicine; an end to the corruption of sirdars who took a month’s salary to provide jobs; fifteen days of annual casual leave, paid leave for a month every year, and paid leave in case of accidents and injuries incurred during work; a month’s notice before dismissal; paid maternity leave of three months; old age provisions for long-term workers; and, banks that could disburse loans at low rates of interest.) to their employer, the Calcutta Municipal Corporation, asking for better working conditions. As the demands were not fulfilled, a strike was launched from 4 March 1928. (Note: Two workers had declared a strike of their own volition; the Union helped spread the strike.) The Corporation responded by implementing a host of repressive measures—picketers were physically assaulted and even blacklisted from accessing public services including latrines—and refused to accord legitimacy to the union until the un-cleared wastes threatened to foment an epidemic in the city; Dasgupta characterized the Corporation and its men as "oppressors".

The strike broke on 9 March as the Corporation reluctantly sanctioned a salary hike of 1 Rupee; additionally, the Mayor promised to not retaliate against the picketers. However, as police cases were not withdrawn, a renewed strike was launched on 25 June; Dasgupta was arrested for using abusive language against municipal employees who tried to break the strike. (Note: Notably, in April, the Swarajists were voted out of power, and their press reported on the second strike favourably. Nonetheless, Sarkar notes that the demands of the scavengers failed to attract much scrutiny; they were not among the taxpayers, had no right to vote, and held no electoral power.) The Corporation yet again turned a blind eye until the sewers overflowed and an enraged public demanded the issue to be sorted; the strike finally ended on 5 July with fresh commitments of non-retaliation.

=== Bengal Jute Workers' Union ===
The Bengal Jute Workers' Union (BJWU) was formed in late 1928 out of a merger between the Bengal Jute Workers' Association, which had come up in present-day North 24 Parganas, and the Chengail and Bauria Jute Workers' Union, which had a foothold in Howrah and Budge Budge. BJWU quickly became among the two significant trade unions in the jute mill sector in Bengal alongside the Kankinarah Labour Union (KLU), noted for its moderate stances and fervent opposition to Communism.

In May 1929, Dasgupta—by then, a leading figure in the activist circles in Calcutta—was elected as the president of BJWU; the election was necessitated by the colonial government choosing to arrest Kalidas Bhattacharya, the founder-president of the Union, for alleged involvement in a communist conspiracy to overthrow the government. In the same election, Kali Kumar Sen was elected the chairman; a leading Communist and member of WPP, Sen eschewed a more radical brand of politics than Dasgupta leading to factional rivalry within the Union.

==== Jute mill strike (1929) ====
In July 1929, as the Indian Jute Mills Association (IJMA) increased mandatory work hours and decreased bonuses, workers began defying the management by refusing to work beyond the old requirements and then launched total strikes. Rumours of an increase in work time had been rife for months, and the unions had met as early as May when Dasgupta and others, unlike Sen, rejected striking in favour of a discussion-based approach. Even in mid-July, Dasgupta resisted the idea of a strike and urged strikers to resume work, later agreeing to a compromise of reduced output without a formal strike; this plan, however, failed as the mill owners dismissed the underperforming workers.

As tensions increased, sometime around late July, Dasgupta expressed her support—out of compulsion or not (Note: Dasgupta's decision, undoubtedly, was precipitated to some extent by an attempt to not cede ground to the increasing communist radicalization of BJWU; for example, KLU, which continued to advocate a moderate response—choosing to characterize the strikes as the handiwork of political disruptors, urging the workers to call off strikes, and even trying to break picket lines—lost its entire base by August. However, at the same time, BJWU's initial forays into convincing the workers around Titagarh to strike was unsuccessful and there were remarkably strong anti-strike sentiments. Thus, concludes Sailer, the strikes, "rather than being triggered by workers' agency or trade unionists' activities, ... emerged precisely within the tension between the trade union activity and workers' agency.")—for a full-blown strike; in the next few days, Sen, Bankim Mukherjee, and other colleagues from BJWU utilized the existing networks of communist labour activists to spread the call throughout the jute belt and integrate local strikes under its purview. However, Dasgupta maintained a politically mellower stance than her rival, Sen, throughout. Anne Sailer, a labour historian of Colonial Bengal, notes that while the latter's public addresses invoked the vocabulary of class conflict, Dasgupta's were predicated on honour, responsibility, and solidarity; supporters routinely introduced her as the caring Mother of the workers and even deified her as Lakshmi.

Finally, on 3 August, Dasgupta publicly called for a general strike in Jagatdal and Titagarh to commence from two days later. (Note: Sailer suggests two reasons for the choice of the place and the date — (1) Sen had been arrested only a couple of days before for agitating in a mill and incarcerated, and (2) communist networks were weaker in this region than the South. Thus, Dasgupta had an unprecedented chance to assert her command over BJWA and steer its politics.) By 6 August, several mills across Kolkata and its immediate suburbs (Note: By 6 August, mills in Rishra, Kankinarah, Jagatdal, Titagarh, and Garden Reach has joined the strike.) had joined what was an unprecedented confrontation between the labouring class and industrialists; the strike even spread into areas where BJWU barely had any organizational hold. By mid-August, even the mills from the extremities—Uluberia, Budge Budge, Bauria, etc.—had joined in though often with unique—and even opposing—demands that didn't find a place in the strike's official agenda, set by Dasgupta. Omkar Goswami, a historian of the jute economy in colonial Bengal, notes "intensive picketing, processions of bands of workers carrying red flags, and extensive distribution of radically worded pamphlets and posters printed on red" to have become routine as about 3 million labourers refused to join work until their demands were met with.

As the strike prolonged, the state drew blame for the poor condition of the workers and anti-colonialism became an integral part of the protest; further, the strike began to spread across other industries, forcing the government to intervene. And finally, despite not being a registered trade union, BJWU was invited to participate in a tripartite meeting with the IJMA, KLU, and the government labour officer, in what was a significant political victory for the nascent organization; Dasgupta represented BJWU in the negotiations.

==== Aftermath and Expulsion ====
On 16 August, Dasgupta reached a settlement with the IJMA agreeing to raise pay in proportion to increased work hours, restore earlier bonus schemes, provide maternity benefits, and refrain from retaliating against strikers, and she called off the strike. However, most of Dasgupta's colleagues were unaware of her negotiations and the strikers had rejected an informal offer—along the lines of the one accepted by Dasgupta—from IJMA only days earlier; moreover, the settlement failed to address issues specific to individual mills. (Note: Sailer views Dasgupta to have taken an easy route out to avoid the union losing control over the strike.) Also, unknown to almost all workers, wage increases had never figured in the strike’s formal demands; on 20 August, when workers in Champdani protested the settlement and demanded better wages, she refused support and asked them to wait till the union was better organized, leading to renewed strikes. In some areas, workers heckled BJWU leaders and even demanded a week's wages from the union since the accepted settlement mirrored what has been informally proposed earlier; in other areas, the implementation of the settlement was delayed, and workers took to striking again.

On 25 August, Dasgupta was expelled for alleged "high-handedness" in agreeing to the settlement without engaging in any discussion with fellow unionists, and in what was described as a Communist takeover, Sen took over the mantle of BJWU. Dasgupta promptly founded the Bengal Jute Workers’ Association (BJWA) with Bakar Ali Mirza and Nripendra Chaudhuri, and became its president. In a later account, Dasgupta took pride in having concealed from her colleagues her decision to call off the strike, which she claimed allowed her to outmanoeuvre the moneylenders who benefited from the workers’ increased dependence on them during the stoppage and therefore had an interest in prolonging it.

=== Bengal Jute Workers' Association ===
From around 1930, the trade union movement became fragmented with the two rival unions establishing influence in different parts of the jute belt. The BJWU retained its stronghold in North 24 Parganas, while the BJWA predominated in the South 24 Parganas. Neither organization established a substantial base in Hooghly, where revolutionary nationalists held greater influence. Consequently, the prospects of organizing general strikes remained limited, and labour militancy rarely extended beyond local disputes. The sharp increase in unemployment during the first half of the 1930s further circumscribed the scope of labor politics.

In early March, Dasgupta called for a one-day strike in the mills around Jagatdal and Titagarh to compel the IJMA into negotiating better salaries with the workers. The BJWA, however, lost control of the agitation: the strike continued until the end of the month, led to clashes with the police, and ultimately failed, with the workers compelled to return to work unconditionally. In November 1932, Dasgupta organized another round of strikes which also proved unsuccessful and resulted in outright dismissal of approximately 300 picketers.

=== Retirement ===
The BJWA depended heavily on private financial support to sustain its operations. I. B. Sen initially financed the association; after his death, Bakar Ali Mirza contributed from his own resources, but these funds were soon exhausted, making it increasingly difficult for Dasgupta to maintain the organization. The resulting financial crisis contributed to her eventual withdrawal from active labour politics.

== Personal life ==
Dasgupta married Bakar Ali Mirza, a fellow trade-unionist and then-general Secretary of the Bengal Jute Workers Association. Little is known about their married life; they did not have children. She died in January 1976. Swapan Dasgupta, a leading intellectual of the Hindu Right in India, and Krishnendu Dasgupta, corporate professional, are her great-nephews.

== Legacy ==
Sarkar notes Dasgupta to have belonged to a generation of avant-garde women—from privileged backgrounds—in inter-War Calcutta who defied (Note: Such a defiance drew both sympathy—from the Nationalists who, for example, were horrified at a young educated lady working for social upliftment being arrested by the Police—and ire—from the conservative press who took umbrage at a Baidya woman intermingling with the untouchables—in contemporary society.) the social norms of the time as much out of a personal desire to revolt as due to a commitment to leftist political ideology even if not espousing a definite political affiliation. Samita Sen notes her to be one of the very few women who took part in the trade unionist movement in colonial Bengal.

Recollecting her career in 1968, Dasgupta however rejected participating in any “trade union movement” and claimed to have acted merely out of humanist instincts. She rejected the trade unionist model of collecting subscriptions from workers and harbored suspicions about the union leaders enriching themselves from workers' contributions. Reflecting her paternalistic and apolitical approach to labour organization, she even referred to the mills and their surrounding localities as her “zamindari” (fiefdom) where she used local strongmen to exclude communist and Congress organizers.
