= Ballygunge Assembly constituency =

West Bengal Legislative Assembly constituency

Ballygunge
- Constituency No. 161 for the West Bengal Legislative Assembly
- Interactive Map Outlining Ballygunge Assembly Constituency

Constituency details
- Country: India
- Region: East India
- State: West Bengal
- District: Kolkata
- Lok Sabha constituency: Kolkata Dakshin
- Established: 1951
- Total electors: 247,623
- Reservation: None

Member of Legislative Assembly
- 18th West Bengal Legislative Assembly
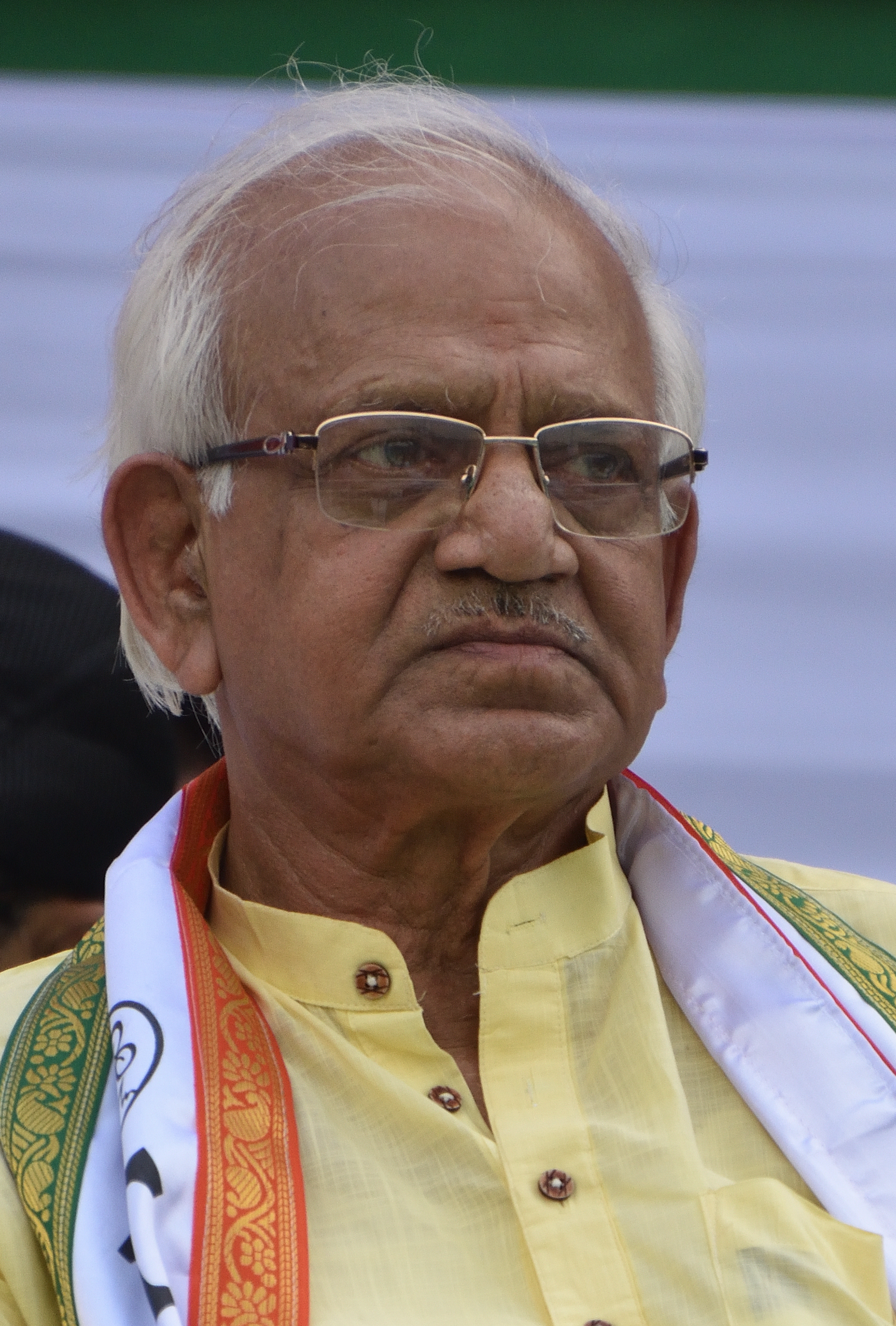
- Incumbent Sovandeb Chattopadhyay
- Party: MAITC
- Elected year: 2026

Ballygunge Assembly constituency is a Legislative Assembly constituency of Kolkata district in the Indian state of West Bengal.

== Overview ==
As per order of the Delimitation Commission in respect of the Delimitation of constituencies in West Bengal, Ballygunge Assembly constituency is composed of the following:

- Ward Nos. 60, 61, 64, 65, 68, 69 and 85 of Kolkata Municipal Corporation.

Borough	Ward No.	Councillor	2021 Winner
VI	60	Kaiser Jamil	Trinamool Congress
VI	61	Manzar Iqbal	Trinamool Congress
VII	64	Shammi Jahan Begum	Trinamool Congress
VII	65	Nibedita Sharma	Trinamool Congress
VIII	68	Sudarshana Mukherjee	Trinamool Congress
VIII	69	Dilip Bose	Trinamool Congress
VIII	85	Debasish Kumar	Trinamool Congress

Ballygunge Assembly constituency is part of No. 23 Kolkata Dakshin Lok Sabha constituency.

== Members of the Legislative Assembly ==
Year	Name	Party
1952	Jogesh Chandra Gupta	Indian National Congress
1957	Jnendra Mazumdar	Communist Party of India
1962	Anil Moitra	Independent
1967	Jyotibhushan Bhattacharya	Communist Party of India (Marxist)
1969	Jyotibhushan Bhattacharya	Communist Party of India (Marxist)
1971	Subrata Mukherjee	Indian National Congress
1972	Subrata Mukherjee	Indian National Congress
1977	Sachin Sen	Communist Party of India (Marxist)
1982	Sachin Sen	Communist Party of India (Marxist)
1987	Sachin Sen	Communist Party of India (Marxist)
1991	Sachin Sen	Communist Party of India (Marxist)
1992^	Rabin Deb	Communist Party of India (Marxist)
1996	Rabin Deb	Communist Party of India (Marxist)
2001	Rabin Deb	Communist Party of India (Marxist)
2006	Javed Ahmed Khan	Trinamool Congress
2011	Subrata Mukherjee	Trinamool Congress
2016	Subrata Mukherjee	Trinamool Congress
2021	Subrata Mukherjee	Trinamool Congress
2022^	Babul Supriyo	Trinamool Congress
2026	Sovandeb Chattopadhyay	Trinamool Congress

^ by-poll

== Election results ==
=== 2026 ===
2026 West Bengal Legislative Assembly election: Ballygunge
Party	Candidate	Votes	%	±%
AITC	Sovandeb Chattopadhyay	108,481	64.81	▲15.12
BJP	Shatorupa	47,005	28.08	▲15.25
CPI(M)	Afreen Begum	7,185	4.29	▼25.77
INC	Rohan Mitra	1,975	1.18	▼3.88
NOTA	None of the above	819	0.49	▼0.38
Majority		61,476	36.73	▼13.19
Turnout		167,384	88.57	▲27.62
AITC hold		Swing		

=== 2022 bypoll ===
West Bengal Legislative Assembly by-election 2022: Ballygunge
Party	Candidate	Votes	%	±%
AITC	Babul Supriyo	51,199	49.68	▼20.92
CPI(M)	Saira Shah Halim	30,971	30.05	▲24.44
BJP	Keya Ghosh	13,220	12.83	▼7.85
INC	Kamruzzaman Choudhury	5,218	5.06	New entry
NOTA	None of the above	1,196	1.16	▲0.29
Majority		20,228	19.63	▼30.70
Turnout		1,03,050	41.35	▼8.98
AITC hold		Swing		

=== 2021 ===
2021 West Bengal Legislative Assembly election: Ballygunge
Party	Candidate	Votes	%	±%
AITC	Subrata Mukherjee	106,585	70.6	▲25.07
BJP	Lokenath Chatterjee	31,226	20.68	▲7.28
CPI(M)	Fuad Halim	8,474	5.61	
NOTA	None of the above	1,317	0.87	
Majority		75,359	49.92	
Turnout		150,962	60.95	
AITC hold		Swing		

=== 2016 ===
2016 West Bengal Legislative Assembly election: Ballygunge
Party	Candidate	Votes	%	±%
AITC	Subrata Mukherjee	70,083	45.53	▼15.12
INC	Krishna Debnath	54,858	35.64	New entry
BJP	Jiban Kumar Sen	20,622	13.40	▲9.84
NOTA	None of the Above	3,433	2.23	New entry
BSP	Rajendra Ram Das	1,538	1.00	New entry
Majority		15,225	9.89	▼18.44
Turnout		1,53,941	63.86	▼2.29
AITC hold		Swing	▼15.12	

=== 2011 ===
2011 West Bengal Legislative Assembly election: Ballygunge
Party	Candidate	Votes	%	±%
AITC	Subrata Mukherjee	88,194	60.65	
CPI(M)	Fuad Halim	47,009	32.32	
BJP	Shatorupa	5,188	3.56	
Independent	Moloy Prokash	1,538	1.06	
Majority		41,185	28.33	
Turnout		1,45,414	66.15	
AITC win				
