= Sachin Sen =

Indian politician

MLA
- In office 1977–1992
- Preceded by: Subrata Mukherjee
- Succeeded by: Rabin Deb
- Constituency: Ballygunge

Government Chief Whip, West Bengal Legislative Assembly
- In office 1989–1991
- Preceded by: Niranjan Mukherjee
- Succeeded by: Lakshmi Kanta Dey

Personal details
- Born: 1 June 1917 Galla village, Sylhet, Bengal Presidency, British India (present day Bangladesh)
- Died: 18 March 1992 (aged 74) Kolkata, West Bengal, India
- Party: Communist Party of India (Marxist)
- Spouse: Sadhana Sen
- Education: Murari Chand College, University of Calcutta
- Profession: Politician, social worker

Sachin Sen (1 June 1917 – 18 March 1992) was an Indian politician belonging to the Communist Party of India (Marxist). He was a member of the West Bengal Legislative Assembly from Ballygunge constituency (1977–1992), and served as Chief Government Whip from 1989 to 1991.

== Early life and education ==
Sachin Sen was born on 1 June 1917 in Galla, Sylhet District, Bangladesh. He attended school at Maulavi Bazar Govt.High School in Sylhet, which is now in Bangladesh. He graduated from the Murari Chand College under the University of Calcutta. He was a first division football player.

He joined the Communist Party of India before India's independence and sided with the CPI(M) after the split. He was also a member of All India Students' Federation.

== Political career ==
As a member of the CPIM his work was particularly focused at the grassroots level in refugee settlements in Calcutta. He was also elected to the Calcutta Municipal Corporation.

He unsuccessfully contested from the Rashbehari Avenue Assembly constituency in the 1971 West Bengal Legislative Assembly election and 1972 West Bengal Legislative Assembly election, but lost both times.

He was a member of the CPI(M) Kolkata District Committee and District Secretariat. He was elected to a member of CPI(M) West Bengal State Committee in 1980s.

He was elected from Ballygunge Assembly Constituency, part of South Kolkata Lok Sabha constituency. He was nominated to contest from Ballygunge in 1977 and won the support and confidence of the people. He was re-elected in 1982, 1987, 1991.

Sen also served as the Government Chief Whip in West Bengal Legislative Assembly between 1989 and 1991.

He was a senior leader of All India Chemical and Pharmaceutical Employees Federation, too. He was also a member of the general council of Centre of Indian Trade Unions.

He has also contributed a lot in pharma industry's field workers movement.

== Sports Administration ==
Being a football player he was active in sports administration in the state. He was a member of the Cricket Association of Bengal since 1971.

Sen was also elected to the governing Body of Indian Football Association since 1989 and was also the General Secretary of East Bengal Club, Calcutta, 1990.

== Controversy ==
He was one of the accused in the Bijon Setu massacre, where 16 Hindu sadhus and a sadhvi belonging to Ananda Marga, were burned to death at Bijon Setu, near Ballygunge, Kolkata, in West Bengal, India, on 30 April 1982.

Although the attacks were carried out in broad daylight, no arrests were ever made. After repeated calls for a formal judicial investigation, a single-member judicial commission was set up to investigate the killings in 2012.

== Personal life ==
He was married to Sadhana Sen. The couple had two sons. He died in 1992, while serving as a member of the assembly.
