= Electoral history of Mamata Banerjee =

Elections featuring Chief Minister of West Bengal

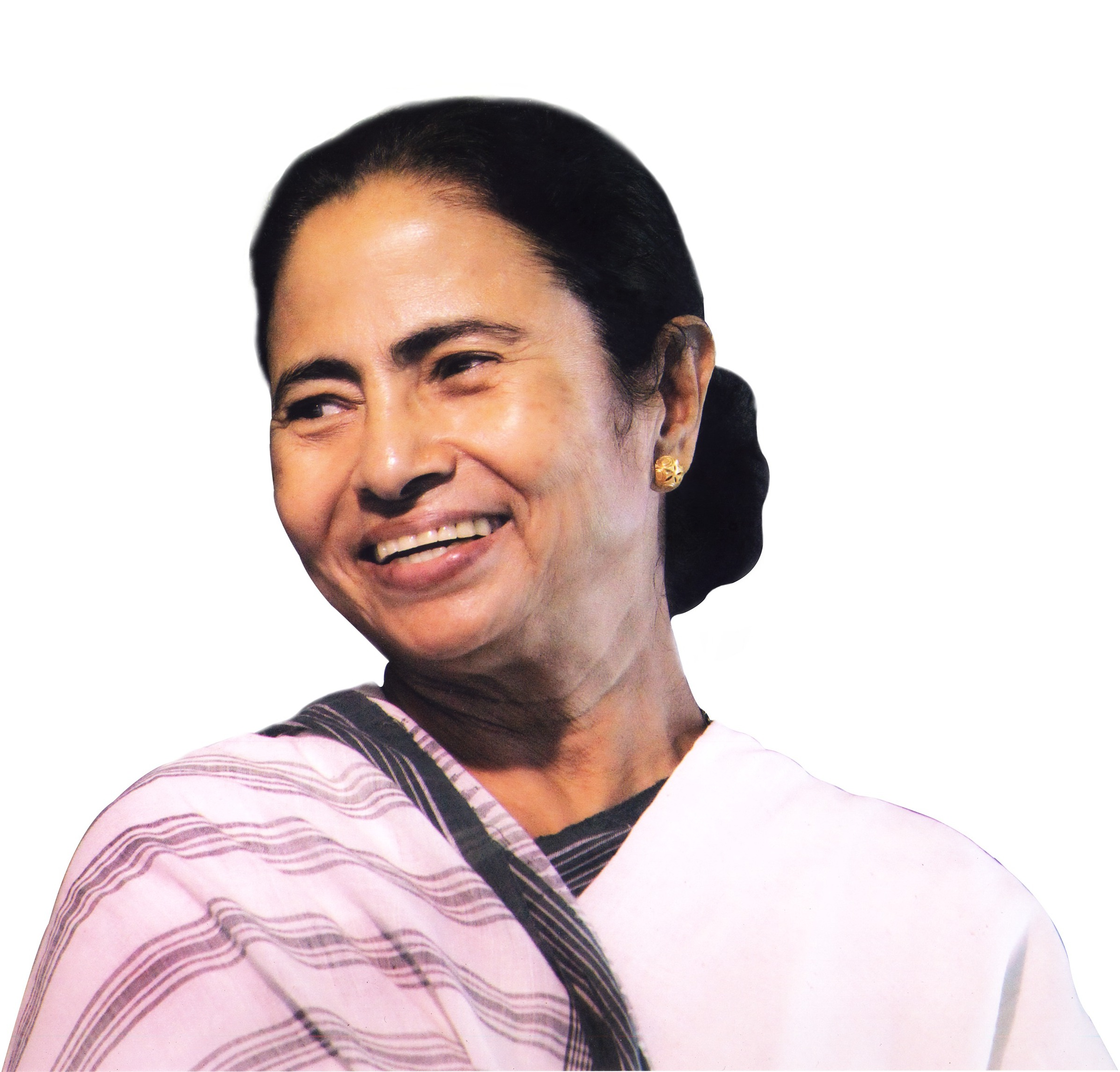
Official portrait, 2015

This is a summary of the electoral history of Mamata Banerjee, who served as the 8th Chief Minister of West Bengal from 2011 to 2026.

== Summary ==
=== Lok Sabha elections ===
Year	Constituency	Party	Votes	%	Result
1984	Jadavpur	INC	331,618	50.87	Won
1989	Jadavpur	INC	410,288	46.67	Lost
1991	Kolkata Dakshin	INC	367,896	52.46	Won
1996	Kolkata Dakshin	INC	438,252	52.50	Won
1998	Kolkata Dakshin	AITC	503,551	59.37	Won
1999	Kolkata Dakshin	AITC	469,103	58.26	Won
2004	Kolkata Dakshin	AITC	393,561	51.10	Won
2009	Kolkata Dakshin	AITC	576,045	57.19	Won

=== West Bengal Legislative Assembly elections ===
Year	Constituency	Party	Votes	%	Result
2011^	Bhabanipur	AITC	73,635	77.46	Won
2016	Bhabanipur	AITC	65,520	47.67	Won
2021	Nandigram	AITC	108,808	47.64	Lost
2021^	Bhabanipur	AITC	85,263	71.90	Won
2026	Bhabanipur	AITC	58,812	42.19	Lost

^By poll

== Detailed results ==
=== Lok Sabha elections ===
==== General election 1984 ====
1984 Indian general election : Jadavpur
Party	Candidate	Votes	%	±%
INC	Mamata Banerjee	331,618	50.87%	
CPI(M)	Somnath Chatterjee	311,958	47.85%	
IC(S)	Sakti Sarkar	5993	0.92%	
Independent	Rajanath Prasad	2336	0.36%	
Majority		19,660		
Turnout		651905		
INC gain from CPIM		Swing	{{{swing}}}	

==== General election 1989 ====
1989 Indian general election : Jadavpur
Party	Candidate	Votes	%	±%
CPI(M)	Malini Bhattacharya	441,188	50.19%	+4.00%
INC	Mamata Banerjee	410,288	46.67%	
BJP	Uttam Basu	9874	1.12%	
IUML	Laskar Jabed Ali	7994	0.91%	
Majority		30,900		
Turnout		879040		
CPIM gain from INC		Swing	{{{swing}}}	

==== General election 1991 ====
General Election, 1991: Calcutta South
Party	Candidate	Votes	%	±%
INC	Mamata Banerjee	367,896	52.46	
CPI(M)	Biplab Dasgupta	2,74,233	39.10	
BJP	Somraj Dutta	50,541	7.21	
Independent	Ashok kumar Roy Chowdhury	1,958	0.28	
Independent	Sushil Chandra Majumdar	1,779	0.25	
BSP	Parimal Kanti Ray	1,121	0.16	
Independent	Priti Mazumder	877	0.13	
Independent	Bandana Biswas	837	0.12	
Doordarshi Party	Hari Shankar Shah	792	0.11	
Independent	Hajranchhor Chand Bhandari	548	0.08	
Independent	Bhagwan Das Nathany	413	0.06	
Independent	Arun Ghosh	295	0.04	
Independent	Murari Mohan Ghosh	798	0.10	
Majority		93,663		
Turnout		7,01,290	68.50	
INC gain from CPI(M)		Swing		

==== General election 1996 ====
General Election, 1996: Calcutta South
Party	Candidate	Votes	%	±%
INC	Mamata Banerjee	438,252	52.50	
CPI(M)	Bharati Mukherjee	3,34,991	40.10	
BJP	Santi Roy	45,066	5.30	
Independent	Bulu Chatterjee	3,439	0.40	
Independent	Sushil Chandra Majumdar	1,869	0.20	
Independent	D. Guha	1,755	0.20	
Independent	Tripti Das	1,589	0.20	
Independent	Bandana Biswas	1,572	0.20	
All India Indira Congress (Tiwari)	Yasmeen Sen Gupta	1,527	0.20	
Independent	Lalita Seth	1,482	0.20	
Independent	Ramagardi Yadav	1,285	0.20	
Independent	Bablu Dutta	958	0.10	
Independent	Murari Mohan Ghosh	798	0.10	
Majority		1,03,261	12.1	
Turnout		8,52,458	73.0	
INC hold		Swing		

==== General election 1998 ====
General Election, 1998: Calcutta South
Party	Candidate	Votes	%	±%
AITC	Mamata Banerjee	503,551	59.37	
CPI(M)	Prasanta Kumar Sur	279,470	32.95	
INC	Sougata Roy	56,725	6.69	
Independent	Partha Sarathi Ghosh	1,937	0.23	
RJD	Salik Ram Shaw	1,498	0.18	
Independent	G.Joseph	1.497	0.18	
Independent	Rina Sutradhar	1,447	0.17	
Independent	Adrish Bhattacharya	1,236	0.15	
Independent	Addy Samir Kumar	493	0.06	
Independent	Paresh Nath Bandyopadhyay	340	0.04	
Majority		2,24,081	27.7	
Turnout		8,05,121	66.96%	
AITC gain from INC		Swing		

==== General election 1999 ====
General Election, 1999: Calcutta South
Party	Candidate	Votes	%	±%
AITC	Mamata Banerjee	469,103	58.26	
CPI(M)	Subhankar Chakraborty	2,55,095	31.68	
INC	Partha Roy Chowdhury	51,735	6.43	
Communist Party of India (Marxist-Leninist)	Dr. Partha Sarathi Ghosh	6,186		
BSP	Mohammed Sahabuddun	6,091	0.76	
Independent	Ranjan Kumar Das	5.841		
Independent	Murari Mohan Ghosh	4,512		
Independent	Priya Nath Banerjee	2,740		
Independent	Kabita Mukherjee	2,160		
Independent	Bandana Biswas	1,658		
Majority		2,14,008	26.6	
Turnout		8,05,121	66.96	
AITC hold		Swing		

==== General election 2004 ====
General Election, 2004: Calcutta South
Party	Candidate	Votes	%	±%
AITC	Mamata Banerjee	393,561	51.10	−7.26
CPI(M)	Rabin Deb	295,132	38.30	+6.62
INC	Nafisa Ali	60,377	7.80	
Independent	Sujit Kumar Roy	4,782	0.60	
BSP	Kusha Ram	4,431	0.60	
Independent	Bandana Das	4,130	0.50	
Independent	Mukul Paul	2,524	0.30	
Independent	Ranjit Banerjee	2,306	0.30	
Independent	Barnali Mukherjee	2,258	0.30	
Independent	Santu Mukherjee	1,708	0.20	
Independent	Bhushan Mondal	1,533	0.20	
Majority		98,429	12.8%	
Turnout		7,70,828	70.3%	
AITC hold		Swing		

==== General election 2009 ====
2009 Indian general elections: Kolkata Dakshin
Party	Candidate	Votes	%	±%
AITC	Mamata Banerjee	576,045	57.19	+6.09
CPI(M)	Rabin Deb	3,56,474	35.39	−2.91
BJP	Jyotsna Banerjee	39,744	3.95	
BSP	Paresh Chandra Roy	6,745	0.67	
IND	Yusuf Jamal Siddique	6,042	0.60	
IUML	Asif Md	5,896	0.59	
Majority		2,19,571	21.80	
Turnout		10,07,225	66.89	
AITC hold		Swing		

=== West Bengal Legislative Assembly elections ===
==== By-election 2011 ====
The bypoll to the Bhowanipore seat was necessitated after sitting MLA of Trinamool Congress Subrata Bakshi resigned to make way for the Chief Minister Mamata Banerjee to contest. She had not contested the state assembly elections earlier. She had to become a member of the state assembly within six months of her assuming office as Chief Minister as per the rules of the Constitution of India.

Bye-election, 2011: Bhabanipur
Party	Candidate	Votes	%	±%
AITC	Mamata Banerjee (CM Candidate)	73,635	77.46	+12.69
CPI(M)	Nandini Mukherjee	19,422	20.43	−7.55
Independent	Sujay Krishna Bhadra	809	0.85	
Majority		54,213	57.03	+20.24
Turnout		95,064	44.73	−19.04
AITC hold		Swing	+12.69	

==== State election 2016 ====
2016 West Bengal Legislative Assembly election: Bhabanipur
Party	Candidate	Votes	%	±%
AITC	Mamata Banerjee	65,520	47.67	▼29.79
INC	Deepa Dasmunshi	40,219	29.26	New
BJP	Chandra Kumar Bose	26,299	19.13	New
NOTA	None of the Above	2,461	1.79	New
BSP	Nirmal Kanti Samaddar	669	0.27	
Majority		25,301	18.41	▼38.62
Turnout		1,37,475	66.83	▲22.11
AITC hold		Swing	▼29.79	

==== State election 2021 ====
In the 2021 elections, Suvendu Adhikari of BJP defeated his nearest rival and incumbent chief minister Mamata Banerjee of TMC.

2021 West Bengal Legislative Assembly election: Nandigram
Party	Candidate	Votes	%	±%
BJP	Suvendu Adhikari	110,764	48.49	▲43.09
AITC	Mamata Banerjee	1,08,808	47.64	▼19.56
CPI(M)	Minakshi Mukherjee	6,267	2.74	▼23.96
NOTA	None of the Above	1,090	0.48	▼0.15
Majority		1,956	0.85	
Turnout		2,28,467	88.55	▲1.58
BJP gain from AITC		Swing		

==== By-election 2021 ====
Bye-election, 2021: Bhabanipur
Party	Candidate	Votes	%	±%
AITC	Mamata Banerjee	85,263	71.90	▲14.19
BJP	Priyanka Tibrewal	26,428	22.29	▼12.87
CPI(M)	Shrijeeb Biswas	4,226	3.56	
NOTA	None of the Above	1,453	1.23	
Majority		58,835	49.61	
Turnout				
AITC hold		Swing	▲14.19	

==== State election 2026 ====
In the 2026 elections, Suvendu Adhikari of BJP again defeated his nearest rival and incumbent chief minister Mamata Banerjee of TMC.

2026 West Bengal Legislative Assembly election: Bhabanipur
Party	Candidate	Votes	%	±%
BJP	Suvendu Adhikari	73,917	53.02	▲30.73
AITC	Mamata Banerjee	58,812	42.19	▼29.71
CPI(M)	Shrijeeb Biswas	3,556	2.55	▼1.01
INC	Pradip Prasad	1,257	0.9	New entry
NOTA	None of the above	829	0.59	▼0.64
Majority		15,105	10.83	▲
Turnout		1,39,413		▼
BJP gain from AITC		Swing		
