= Javed Ahmed Khan =

Indian politician

Javed Khan
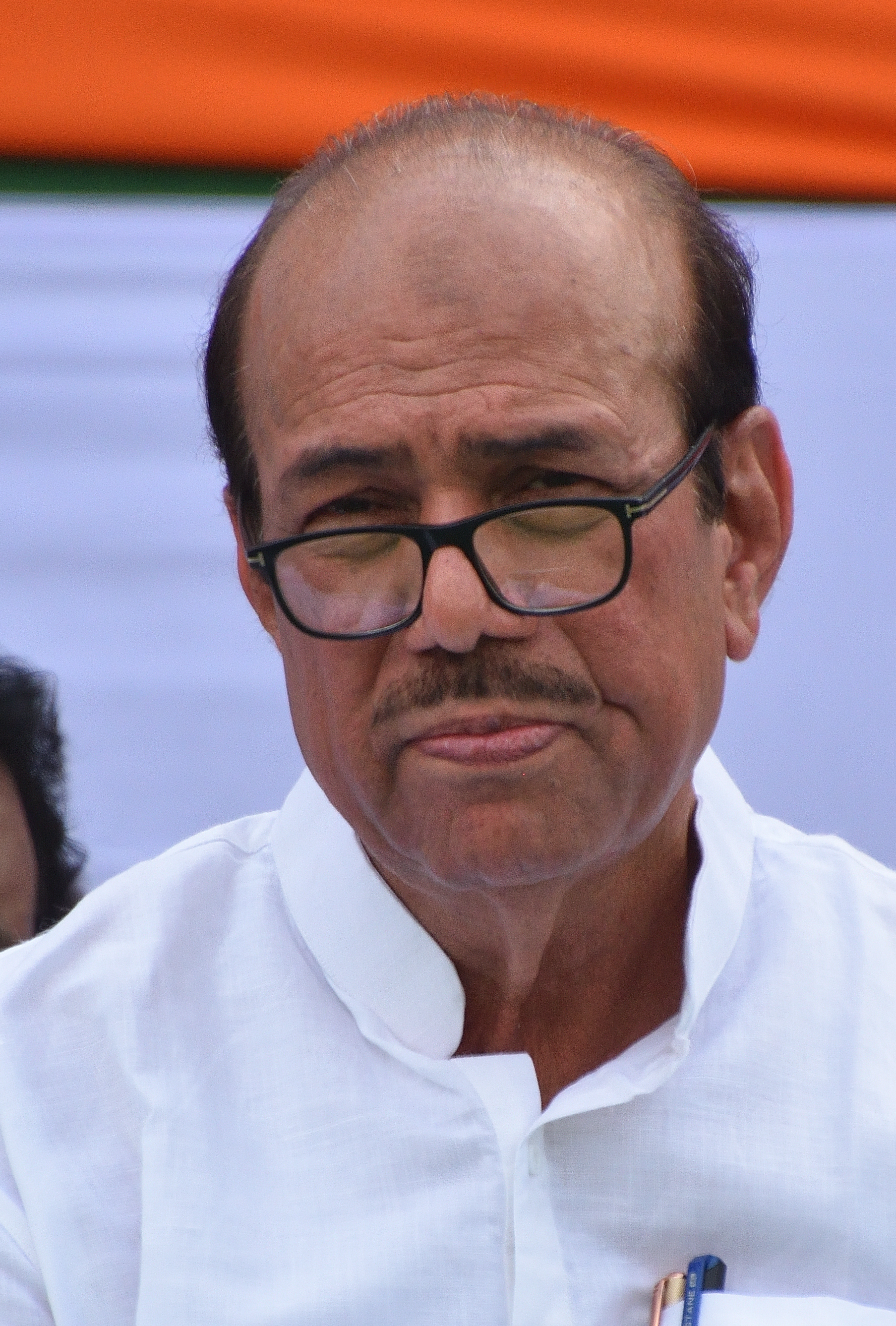
- Javed Khan in March, 2023

Deputy Leader of the Opposition in West Bengal
- Incumbent
- Assumed office 3 June 2026 Serving with Sandipan Saha; Seuli Saha; Sabina Yeasmin
- Governor: R. N. Ravi
- Leader of the Opposition: Ritabrata Banerjee
- Preceded by: Ashima Patra; Nayna Bandyopadhyay

Member of the West Bengal Legislative Assembly
- Incumbent
- Assumed office 13 May 2011
- Constituency: Kasba
- In office 2006–2011
- Preceded by: Rabin Deb
- Succeeded by: Subrata Mukherjee
- Constituency: Ballygunge

Leader of the Opposition, Kolkata Municipal Corporation
- In office 2005–2010
- Preceded by: Nirmal Mukherjee
- Succeeded by: Rupa Bagchi
- Constituency: Ward No. 66

Member, Mayor in Council (Health), Kolkata Municipal Corporation
- In office 2000–2005
- Constituency: Ward No. 66

Personal details
- Born: 31 August 1956 (age 70) Kolkata, India
- Party: Democratic Trinamool Congress
- Education: Calcutta University

Javed Ahmed Khan (born 31 August 1956) is an Indian politician and the former minister for disaster management in the Government of West Bengal from 2011 to 2026. Formerly a member of the All India Trinamool Congress (TMC) party, he is also an MLA, elected from the Kasba constituency in the 2011 West Bengal state assembly election. Khan is a long-standing politician. Born in 1956, he completed his Bachelor of Commerce (Hons.) from St. Xavier's College, Kolkata in 1978. Khan got involved in public service.

In the year 2006, the people of Ballygunge (South Kolkata, West Bengal, India) elected Khan as their representative (MLA) in the West Bengal Legislative Assembly.

Khan has also served as a councillor of Ward no. 66 (Topsia) from 1995 to 2010. In addition, in the year 2000–2005, Khan was sworn in as the Member, Mayor in Council (Health) of the Kolkata Municipal Corporation (KMC), headed by Subrata Mukherjee (former mayor of Kolkata). From 2005 to 2010, Khan was elected as the leader of the Opposition in the KMC.

== Controversies and legal issues ==
Throughout his political career, Khan has been associated with several legal issues and political controversies.

Disproportionate Assets Allegations (2017–2022) In 2017, a Public Interest Litigation (PIL) was filed in the Calcutta High Court seeking an inquiry into the financial assets of 19 senior TMC leaders, including Javed Ahmed Khan. The petitioners alleged that the net worth and properties of these leaders had increased disproportionately between 2011 and 2016. In August 2022, a division bench of the Calcutta High Court directed that the Enforcement Directorate (ED) be made a party to the case to investigate the claims of amassed disproportionate assets.

Post-Poll Violence and Alipore Court Surrender (May 2026) Following the declaration of the West Bengal assembly election results on May 4, 2026, widespread clashes and vandalism were reported in Kolkata's Tiljala area under the Kasba constituency. An FIR was subsequently lodged against 10 individuals, including Khan, for their alleged involvement in triggering the post-poll unrest. Consequently, on May 21, 2026, Khan surrendered before the Alipore Court and secured bail in connection with the violence case.

Illegal Construction Notices and Rebellion against TMC (May–June 2026) In May 2026, the Kolkata Municipal Corporation and state government initiated a drive against illegal encroachments. During this operation, a show-cause notice was issued against a building reportedly owned by Khan in Kasba, ordering him to produce valid papers under threat of demolition. Khan claimed the property had no legality issues and publicly criticized his own party's "bulldozer politics" and eviction operations.

The rift escalated when Khan publicly stated that there was "no democracy in the party." By June 2026, he aligned himself with a massive dissident faction of 58 MLAs led by expelled party leader Ritabrata Banerjee. On June 3, 2026, the rebel faction staked a claim as the main opposition party in the West Bengal assembly and proposed Khan's name for the post of Deputy Leader of the Opposition. In response to the rebellion, TMC Chairperson Mamata Banerjee officially expelled Khan, alongside seven other senior leaders (including Firhad Hakim and Arup Roy), from the party on June 23, 2026, for "anti-party activities."

Political offices
Preceded by Pratim Chatterjee	Minister of Disaster Management in the West Bengal Government; 2011 –	Succeeded by incumbent
State Legislative Assembly
Preceded by Rabin Deb	Member of the West Bengal Legislative Assembly from Ballygunge Assembly constituency 2006–2011	Succeeded by Subrata Mukherjee
New seat	Member of the West Bengal Legislative Assembly from Kasba, Kolkata Assembly constituency 2016–	Incumbent
