= Margo (soap) =

Brand of soap manufactured in India

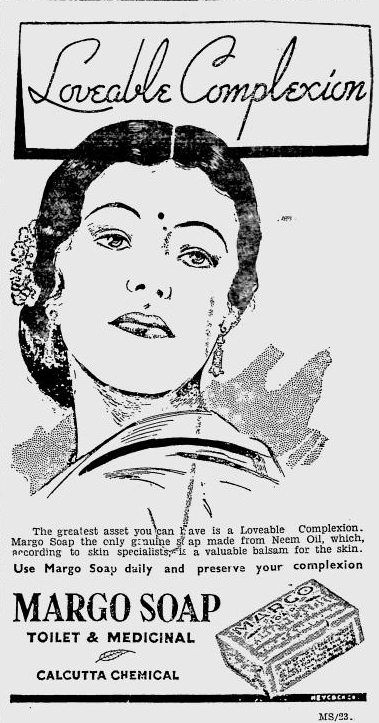
- Advertisement for Margo soap in Indian express newspaper dated April 5, 1939
- Formation: 1920
- Founder: K.C. Das
- Type: Public
- Headquarters: India
- Location: India

Margo is a brand of soap manufactured in India. The soap has margosa as its main ingredient. The soap was created and manufactured by the Calcutta Chemical Company under the stewardship of its founder, K.C. Das, and was launched in 1920. In 1988, the soap was among the top five-selling brands in India, with a market share of 8.9%. As of 2001, the brand was worth ₹75 crores and belonged to Henkel-SPIC. As of 2003, the brand was relaunching new products focused on the younger demographic, and had a market share of close to 2% of the premium-soaps segment in India. In 2011, Jyothy Laboratories acquired the rights to the brand following the acquisition of controlling stake in Henkel India.
