= Calcutta Chemical Company =

Indian pharmaceutical company

The Calcutta Chemical Company established in Kolkata (formerly Calcutta) in 1916 by K.C. Das, B.N. Maitra, and R.N. Sen, was founded during the Swadeshi Movement in Bengal, which encouraged entrepreneurship in opposition to British goods. The company was known for originating Margo soap, Neem Toothpaste, and Lavender Dew Powder and was primarily owned and managed by S.C. Dasgupta and his wife, Rekha.

Following her husband's death in 1979, Rekha Dasgupta assumed leadership and eventually sold the company to Shaw Wallace.

It was then further sold to German consumer goods company Henkel, which incorporated Henkel India. More recently, the company once again changed hands and was acquired by VVF, a contract soap manufacturer, while Henkel retained the rights to the products and focused on their marketing.

The company was owned by the family of senior journalist Swapan Dasgupta.

== Popular brands ==
- Margo (soap)
- Neem Toothpaste
- Aramusk Soap
- Chek Detergent
- Lavender Dew Powder
- MahaBhringraj Oil (Bhringol)
