= Awakening Bharat Mata =

2019 non-fiction book by Swapan Dasgupta

Awakening Bharat Mata: The Political Beliefs of the Indian Right
- First edition cover
- Author: Swapan Dasgupta
- Publisher: Penguin Random House
- Publication date: 2019

Awakening Bharat Mata: The Political Beliefs of the Indian Right is a literary collection by Swapan Dasgupta, published by Penguin Random House in 2019. The book is about the rise and beliefs of right-wing politics in India.

== Background ==
Hindu nationalism is one of the predominant political beliefs prevalent in India. According to the author, the book is not about Hindu nationalism as a power, but as a social and political movement.

== Publication ==
Awakening Bharat Mata: The Political Beliefs of the Indian Right is a 2019 literary collection by a Bharatiya Janata Party politician Rajya Sabha and Padma Bhushan award recipient Swapan Dasgupta. The book was published by Penguin Random House and contains 440 pages.

== Summary ==
Dasgupta wrote the first three chapters of the book, which are: The Political context; Motherland, Religion and Community; Politics and the Hindu Narrative. The book then provides a collection of essays which are divided into three categories: The Motherland and Nation Building, History, and Fault Lines.

The latter section of the book contains essays written by Bankim Chandra Chatterjee, Sister Nivedita, Sri Aurobindo, R. C. Majumdar, Jadunath Sarkar, Veer Savarkar, Mahadev Govind Ranade, Sardar Patel, Sita Ram Goel, Ananda Coomaraswamy, Ramananda Chatterjee, Nirad C. Chaudhuri, L. K. Advani, Girilal Jain and S. Gurumurthy.

== Reception ==
Rishi Raj, reviewing for the Financial Express, called the book a "timely book". According to Raj, in India's left liberal dominated discourse, BJP and Hindutva politics have been given distaste in intellectual and academic circles. Besides tracking the rise and success of Hindutva politics, the book also examines its faultlines. Raj praised the essays selected by Dasgupta but expected the author's own analysis on its relevance in today's times. In the end of review, Raj suggests to give the book to liberal historian Ramachandra Guha when he rues about absence of India's conservative intellectuals.

Ravish Tiwari, writing for The Indian Express, observed that the book teases out different strands of Hindu cultural nationalist belief. According to him, the book's introductory chapters form the context of the book but specific context is lacking on why the essays were chosen. For The Week, Vijaya Pushkarna wrote that book is an attempt to identify some of the ideas, attitudes and beliefs of conservatism in India. "Anecdotes and stories in the book," wrote Pushkarna, "are interesting to read." She observed that Dasgupta's chapters in the book are more about Narendra Modi and his contributions to economic intellect and ideas for the BJP.
