= Mohini Devi =

- Born: 1863; Manikganj, Dhaka, British India (present-day Bangladesh)
- Died: 25 March 1955 (aged 91–92)
- Citizenship: British India (until 1947); Pakistan (until 1964); India
- Occupations: Politician, women’s education advocate, women’s emancipation activist, social reformer
- Years active: Non-Cooperation Movement (1921–1922); Civil Disobedience Movement (1930–1931)
- Known for: Prominent role in the anti-British freedom movement
- Movement: Indian independence movement
- Spouse: Tarak Chandra Dasgupta
- Children: Prabhabati Dasgupta (daughter)
- Parents: Ramshankar Sen (father); Umasundari Devi (mother)

Mohini Devi (1863 – 25 March 1955) was a prominent figure in the Indian independence movement in the Indian subcontinent, known as an ardent nationalist and revolutionary. Her family was closely associated with the progressive education and cultural movements of present-day Bangladesh. Mohini Devi worked actively in support of the Indian independence movement and made significant contributions to women’s education, emancipation, and social reform.

== Early life and family ==
Mohini Devi was born in 1863 into an affluent Hindu family in Manikganj, Dhaka District. Her father was Ramshankar Sen, and her mother was Umasundari Devi. At the age of twelve, she was married to Tarak Chandra Dasgupta. Their daughter, Prabhabati Dasgupta, later became a noted leader of the labour movement.

=== Education ===
Mohini Devi was the first Hindu student at Victoria School, Kolkata. She studied under Shibnath Shastri and Ramtanu Lahiri. Later, she received English education from a woman teacher of the United Mission. Through her education, she became acquainted with contemporary Indian society, nationalist ideology, and social reform movements. From an early age, she was actively involved in various social and welfare activities.

== Political life ==
In 1921–1922, she was imprisoned for participating in Gandhi’s Non-Cooperation Movement. During 1930–1931, she led the Civil Disobedience Movement and was jailed for six months. Her speeches as president of the ‘All India Women’s Association’ were highly praised. During the 1946 riots, she promoted Hindu–Muslim unity while remaining in her home at Entally Bagan, a Muslim-majority area of Kolkata. Though she faced criticism from relatives and friends, she remained steadfast in her convictions. Mohini Devi worked for the independence movement and made significant contributions to women’s education, freedom, and social reform.

=== Role in the Independence Movement ===
During the Non-Cooperation Movement (1920–1922), she responded to Mahatma Gandhi’s call and took an active part in the anti-British struggle. Later, during the Civil Disobedience Movement (1930–1931), she was arrested and imprisoned for defying British laws and police restrictions. During this period, she emerged as a prominent female leader of the Indian National Congress. Her deep faith in Gandhian ideals and her organizational skill led to her election as president of the All India Women’s Congress. Her speeches and leadership drew the attention of Mahatma Gandhi and other Congress leaders of the time. During the Calcutta riots of 1946, she played an active role in maintaining communal harmony, staying in her home in the Muslim-majority Entally Bagan area to promote Hindu–Muslim unity.

Her daughter Prabhabati Dasgupta was also active in the labour movement. Between 1927–1928 and 1930–1931, she served as president of both the ‘Scavengers’ Union of Bengal’ and the ‘Jute Workers’ Union’, becoming a notable figure in the workers’ movement.

== Death ==
Mohini Devi died on 25 March 1955.
