= Department of Finance (West Bengal) =

Indian state government department

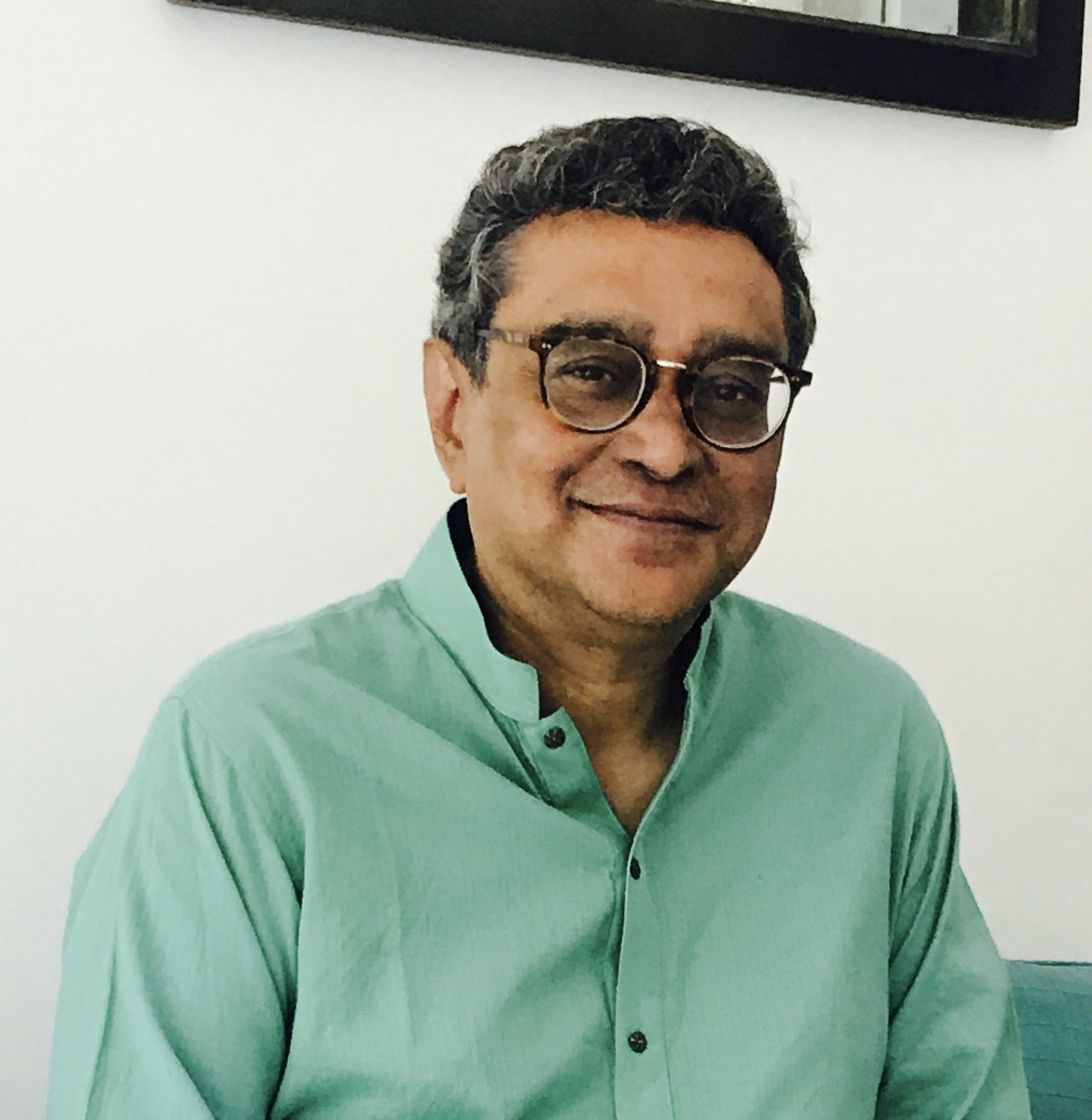
- Cabinet Minister for Finance, Swapan Dasgupta

Department overview
- Jurisdiction: West Bengal
- Headquarters: Nabanna Building, Howrah
- Minister responsible: Dr. Swapan Dasgupta, Cabinet Minister
- Deputy Minister responsible: Anandamoy Barman, MoS
- Department executive: Goutam Kumar Ghosh, IAS, Special Secretary cum Commissioner
- Website: finance.wb.gov.in

The Department of Finance is a Bengal Government department associated with the state's economy and finance. The Department of Finance manages the State Government finances and is involved in all economic and financial subjects surrounding the State. This includes allocating and deploying financial resources for social welfare, infrastructure and administrative purposes.

There are two constituted services under Finance Department, Government of West Bengal.

1. West Bengal Audit and Accounts Service (WBA&AS)
2. West Bengal Revenue Service (WBRS)

== Function ==
The Finance Department of the Government of West Bengal is responsible for managing the financial resources of the state and formulating financial policies and strategies. It plays a crucial role in the overall economic development and governance of West Bengal.

Key responsibilities of the Finance Department include:

1. Budgeting: The department prepares the annual state budget, which outlines the planned expenditures and revenues for the fiscal year. It allocates funds to various government departments and monitors budget implementation.
2. Financial Management: The department manages the state's finances, including revenue collection, expenditure control, and cash flow management. It ensures that financial transactions adhere to legal and regulatory frameworks.
3. Taxation and Revenue Generation: The Finance Department formulates tax policies and implements tax laws to generate revenue for the state. It oversees tax collection, including income tax, sales tax, excise duty, and other levies.
4. Public Debt Management: The department handles the management of public debt, including raising loans and issuing bonds on behalf of the state government. It formulates debt management strategies to ensure fiscal sustainability.
5. Financial Planning and Policy Formulation: The Finance Department develops financial plans and policies to promote economic growth, attract investments, and enhance public welfare. It analyzes economic indicators and formulates strategies for fiscal stability and development.
6. Financial Accountability and Audit: The department ensures financial accountability by conducting audits and reviews of government departments, public corporations, and other entities receiving public funds. It promotes transparency and efficient utilization of resources.
7. Financial Institutions and Agencies: The Finance Department interacts with various financial institutions, such as banks, to manage the state's financial operations. It collaborates with regulatory bodies and financial agencies to promote financial inclusion and economic development.

The Finance Department of the Government of West Bengal plays a pivotal role in managing the state's finances, supporting development initiatives, and ensuring fiscal discipline. Its efforts are aimed at promoting sustainable economic growth, social welfare, and effective governance in West Bengal.

== Branches ==
- Audit Branch
  - Directorate of Treasuries & Accounts
  - Directorate of Pension, Provident Fund & Group Insurance
  - Assistance to Political Sufferers (APS) Sub-Branch
  - Directorate of Small Savings
  - E-Governance Group
  - Medical Cell
  - Law Cell
  - RTI Cell
  - Protocol Cell
  - 21 State wide audit Groups
  - Office of the Financial Advisors (Development and Civil Supplies)
  - Secretariat Personal Assistant Pool
  - Chief Development Office
  - Group J
  - Group T (Admin)
  - Group T (Establishment)
  - WB Appellate Tribunal
- Revenue Branch
  - Directorate of Commercial Tax
  - Directorate of Electricity duty
  - Directorate of Agricultural Income Tax
  - Directorate of Land Tax and Municipal Building Tax
  - Excise Directorate
  - West Bengal State Beverage Corporation Directorate
  - Directorate of Registration & Stamp Revenue
  - West Bengal State Lottery Directorate
  - Directorate of Revenue Intelligence & Enforcement
  - Entry Tax Directorate
  - West Bengal Taxation Tribunal
  - Bureau of Investigation
  - West Bengal Commercial Tax Appellate & Revisional Board
  - Revenue Mobilization Cell
  - WBRS Cell
- Budget Branch
  - Data Processing Centre
  - Project Monitoring Unit
  - Budget Group
  - Group N
  - Statistical Cell
  - Externally Aided Projects (EAP) Cell
  - Public Private Partnership (PPP) Cell
  - Record Cell
  - Rural Infrastructure Development Fund Cell
- Accounts Branch
- Internal Audit Branch
  - CAG Cell
- Institutional Finance Branch
  - West Bengal Financial Corporation
  - West Bengal Industrial Development Financial Corporation
- Pension Branch

== Directorates ==
- Directorate of Commercial Tax
- Excise Directorate
- West Bengal State Beverage Corporation Directorate
- Directorate of Registration & Stamp Revenue
- West Bengal State Lottery Directorate
- Directorate of Treasuries & Accounts
- Directorate of Pension, Provident Fund & Group Insurance
- Directorate of Small Savings
- Directorate of Revenue Intelligence & Enforcement

== Independent Working Groups ==
- Groups A1,A2,B,C,D,E,F,G,H,I,L,M,O,P1,P2,R,S,V
- Corporate Social Responsibility Portal
- Project Clearance Committee
- Government e Marketplace
