= Rabin Deb =

Indian politician

- রবীন দেব
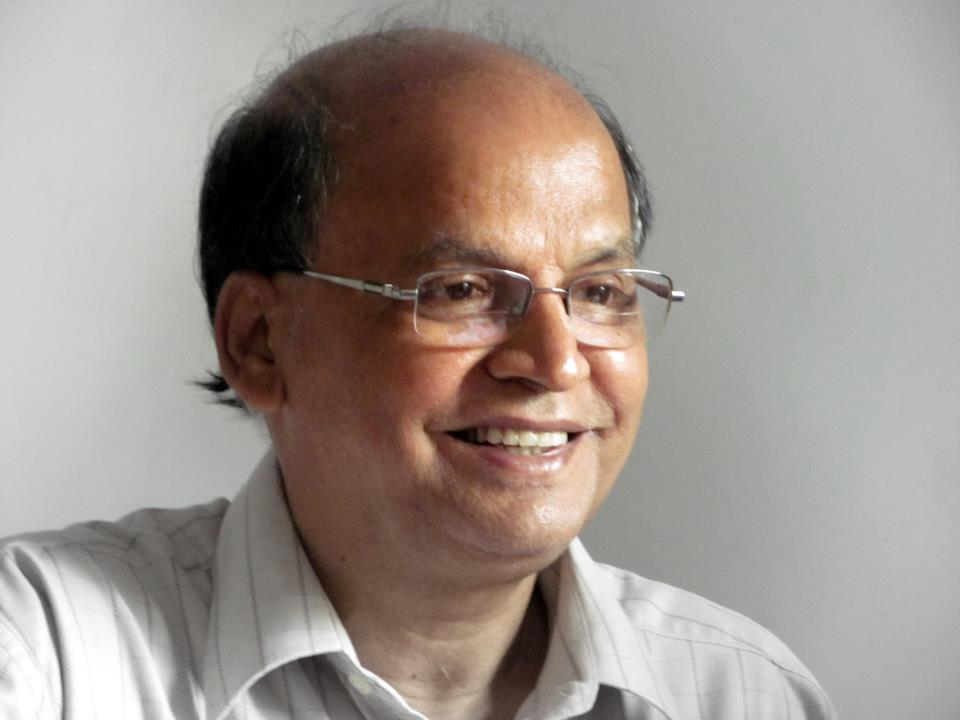

Member of West Bengal Legislative Assembly
- In office 1992–2006
- Preceded by: Sachin Sen
- Succeeded by: Javed Ahmed Khan
- Constituency: Ballygunge

Government Chief Whip, West Bengal Legislative Assembly
- In office 2003–2006
- Preceded by: Lakshmi Kanta Dey
- Succeeded by: Syed Mohammad Masih

State Secretary, West Bengal DYFI
- In office 1984–1991
- Preceded by: Boren Bosu
- Succeeded by: Manab Mukherjee

Personal details
- Born: 8 February 1949 (age 77) Comilla, East Bengal (now Bangladesh)
- Party: Communist Party of India (Marxist)
- Spouse: Rina Deb
- Education: University of Calcutta
- Profession: Politician, social worker

Rabin Deb is an Indian politician. He is currently a member of the Central Committee of the Communist Party of India (Marxist) [abbreviated CPI(M)] and was member of the Legislative Assembly from Ballygunge constituency (1992–2006), where he was Chief Government Whip (2003-2006) of the Government of West Bengal. He helped Central Bureau of Investigation in connection with the Saradha scam by sharing his point of view.

== Early life and education ==
Rabin Deb was born on 8 February 1949 in Nandipara, Comilla District, Bangladesh. He attended school at Brahmmanpara Bhagaban High School in Comilla, which is now in Bangladesh. In his school days he raised his voice against the autocratic military regime and actively participated in the students' movement. He joined Bengal Provincial Students Federation (BPSF) in 1965. He graduated with a degree in Commerce from the Surendranath College under the University of Calcutta. He served as the President of the Students’ Union of Surendranath Law College during the period when the emergency was instituted in West Bengal under the Congress(I) administration in the 1970s.

== Early political career ==
He joined Democratic Youth Federation in 1969 and participated in the mass struggle for re-establishment of democratic rights in West Bengal. He then became a member of Communist Party of India (Marxist) in 1970. Shortly after, he joined UCO Bank on 16 April 1971 and resigned on 16 September 1987 to dedicate his full-time attention to serve CPI(M). He married Rina Deb on 27 November 1977. She worked in UCO Bank where she held a managerial position when she retired. They have a daughter.

== Political career ==
He was a member of Democratic Youth Federation of India (DYFI) and was taught by Dinesh Majumdar, the founder of DYFI. He worked at the grassroots level at Sealdah in Kolkata and Panihati in 24 Parganas. During the emergency period, he was elected to the Calcutta District Committee of DYFI.

He served as the district secretary of the Calcutta District Committee of DYFI between 1982-1984. He became the Secretary of West Bengal State Committee of DYFI (1984-1991), and also as the All India Vice President of DYFI (1988-1991).

He has been a member of the CPI(M) Kolkata District Committee and District Secretariat. He was elected to a member of CPI(M) West Bengal State Committee in 1990s and was included in the State Secretariat in 2012. He was elected to the CPI(M) Central Committee in 2018.

He also represented CPI(M) at the Left Front W.B. State Committee and was a Working Committee member of Centre of Indian Trade Unions (CITU).

He was elected thrice from Ballygunge Assembly Constituency, part of South Kolkata Lok Sabha constituency. He was nominated to contest from Ballygunge in 1992 after the demise of respected CPI(M) leader Sachin Sen and won the support and confidence of the people.

Deb also served as the Government Chief Whip in West Bengal Legislative Assembly between 2003-2006.

He is well known for his voice for the development of Ballygunge constituency and his contribution to the infrastructural development of the locality, such as the construction of elevated flyover from Paroma Island to Bridge No.4, Biresh Guha connector, construction of Gariahat Flyover, Lake Gardens Flyover, Bondel Gate Flyover, construction of 72 inches sewerage high capacity drainage system from Bijon Setu to Rashbehari Connector, and also for modernization of the tram track from Ballygunge depot to Rashbehari crossing and Park Circus crossing, along with removal of soil wastes from Topsia Canal.

He upgraded M. Memorial School (Urdu & Bengali Medium) at Topsia and Jagabandhu School at Shibtala to Madhyamik level. He established Wahed Memorial School at Broad Street and Shaheed-E-Yatan Ashfakullah Computer Training Centre. He commenced the Day-section of Naba Ballygunge Mahavidyalaya (formerly Charuchandra Evening College) and arranged Rs. 1 crore from Rajya Sabha Members’ Fund and MLA's fund for construction of new college building. He initiated the construction of new building for Muzaffar Ahmed School, and allocated Rs. 1 lac from Left MPs’ Development fund for the development of Humayun Kabir Institute. He created a playground at Garsa Abasan in Ward No. 90.

He has also contributed a lot in pharma industry's field workers movement and he is the President of WBMSRU (West Bengal Medical And Sales Representatives'Union). He is the Working Committee member of FMRAI (Federation of Medical & Sales Representatives'Association of India). He was the General Secretary of AIPSO (All India Peace & Solidarity Organization) (Affiliated unit of World Peace Council) & Convenor, WB wing of AIPSO till 29 March 2013. Now he is the member of the Presidium of AIPSO, West Bengal State Committee and one of the Secretaries of AIPSO All India Committee.

He had also contested 2004 Lok Sabha elections and 2009 Lok Sabha elections from the Kolkata Dakshin Lok Sabha constituency but lost both times.

He also unsuccessfully contested Singur Assembly constituency in 2016 West Bengal Legislative Assembly election.

He also contested Rajya Sabha elections in 2018 against Congress leader Abhishek Manu Singhvi.

== Personal life ==
He has been married to Rina Deb, who worked as officer at UCO Bank. The couple has a daughter Samriddhi Deb.
