= Debasish Kumar =

Indian politician

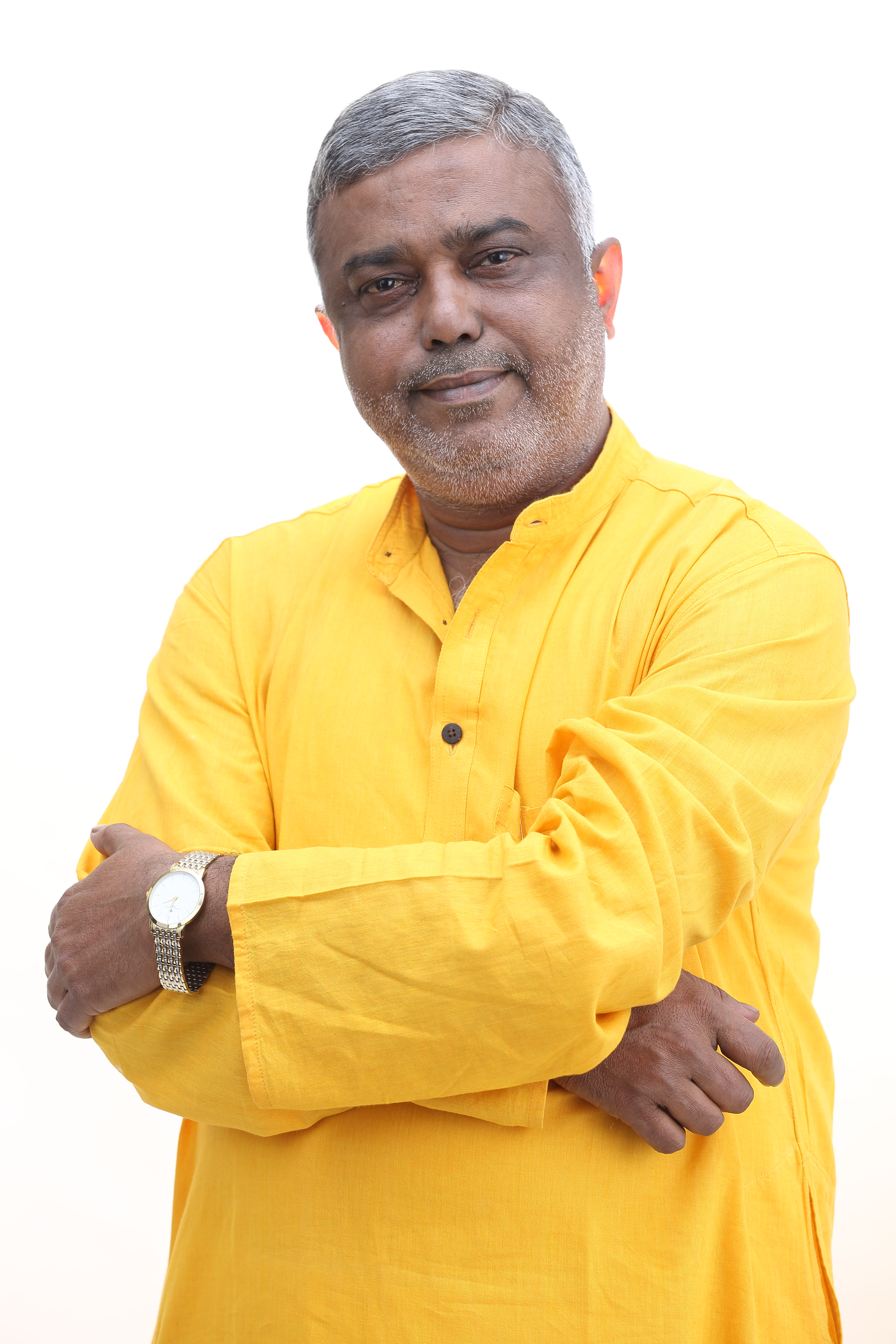

Member of the West Bengal Legislative Assembly
- In office 2 May 2021 – 4 May 2026
- Preceded by: Sovandeb Chattopadhyay
- Succeeded by: Swapan Dasgupta
- Constituency: Rashbehari

Member Of Board of Administration KMC
- Incumbent
- Assumed office 1 April 2020
- Mayor: Firhad Hakim
- Deputy: Atin Ghosh
- Constituency: Ward No. 85

President of South Calcutta District Trinamool Congress Committee
- Incumbent
- Assumed office 23 July 2020

Personal details
- Born: 22 December 1959 (age 66) Kolkata
- Party: Trinamool Congress
- Spouse: Devjani Basu Kumar
- Education: 12th pass
- Profession: Politician
- Website: www.debasishkumar.com

Debasish Kumar (born 22 December 1959) is an Indian politician and member of Trinamool Congress. He is a former MLA, elected from the Rashbehari constituency in the 2021 West Bengal Legislative Assembly election. He was once the Deputy Chief Government Whip, in Government of West Bengal, Assembly House. He was the Member Mayor in Council of Kolkata Municipal Corporation. Debasish Kumar was also the District President, South Kolkata District of Trinamool Congress. Currently he doesn't hold any office after being defeated by Dr Swapan Dasgupta in 2026 election by a margin of over twenty thousand votes. The Trinamool Congress were humiliated and humbled in the election. His daughter Devlina Kumar is an actress and married to actor Gourab Chatterjee.
