= K. C. Das (chemist) =

Indian entrepreneur

Khagendra Chandra Das
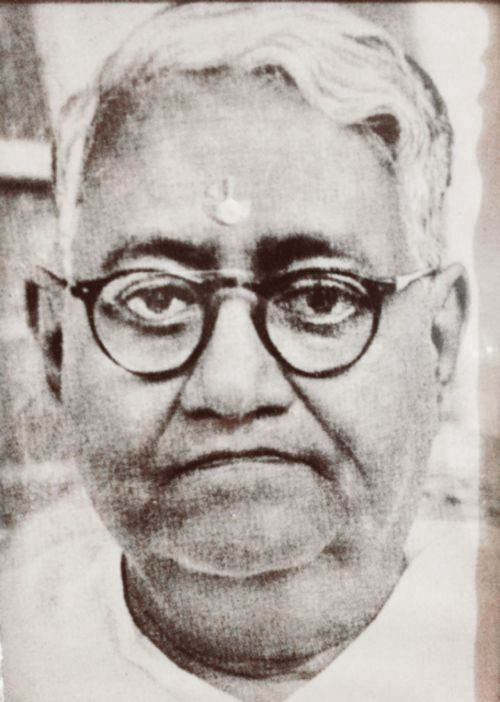
- Education: Heidelberg University
- Occupation: Indian entrepreneur
- Known for: Co-founder of the Calcutta Chemical Company
- Notable work: Margo (soap)

Khagendra Chandra Das (often shortened as K.C. Das) was an Indian entrepreneur and proprietor of the Calcutta Chemical Company. Under his leadership, the company became one of the most prominent businesses of the Swadeshi movement, and was well-known for Margo (soap) and a number of other products.

== Early life ==
K.C. Das was born into an affluent Baidya family in Bengal. He was the son of Rai Bahadur Tarak Chandra Das, a judge, and Mohini Devi, who was later a staunch Gandhian and Independence activist. Mohini Devi was also a former President of the Mahila Atma Raksha Samiti, an organisation committed to women's self defence. Amongst his siblings, the most notable was Dr. Prabhavati Das Gupta, a graduate from Heidelberg University and a trade union activist along with her husband and Congress MP Bakar Ali Mirza.

After completing his education in Calcutta, he became a lecturer at Shibpur College (now Indian Institute of Engineering Science and Technology, Shibpur). At this time, there could be seen a substantial growth in anti-British activity in Bengal, highlighted by the growth of Revolutionary thought and action. Das got involved with a number of other youths who subscribed to this brand of thinking. His father, who was known to be close to certain officials in the Indian government, was informed that his son would soon be arrested if he did not take any preventive action. He then encouraged his son to go abroad to pursue higher studies. Das, who wanted nothing to do with Britain, instead chose to go to the United States.

== Education abroad ==
=== United States ===
Das sailed for the United States on a scholarship from the Indian Society for the Advancement of Scientific Industry, and enrolled at UC Berkeley. However, he and another student, S.M. Bose (later founder of Duckback Waterproof) eventually transferred to Stanford University. Both graduated with degrees in Chemistry in 1910. During this time, Das was very closely involved with Indian independence activities in the United States, forming the California chapter of the Indian Independence League and working closely with Lala Har Dayal.

=== Japan ===
Before returning to India, both Bose and Das proceeded to Japan where each delved further into processes that would come to define their later businesses - waterproofing for Bose, and pharmaceuticals for Das.

== Calcutta Chemical Company ==
=== Establishment ===
Das, along with R.N. Sen and B.N. Maitra, incorporated the Calcutta Chemical Company in 1916. It had its registered office at 35 Panditia Road and an additional factory in Tiljala. The company was established in keeping with the prevailing air of the Swadeshi movement, of which Das was a staunch supporter. He believed that one of the most important industries that was still cornered by the British was the pharmaceutical industry.

=== Popularity ===
The company became highly successful due to its toilet products. Das perfected the process to extract the essence of the Neem plant, which he believed to be symbolic of Indian products, which led to the creation of two enduring brands - Margo (soap) and Neem toothpaste. He priced them in such a way as to allow them to be affordable to every strata of society. He also created and marketed a number of other products, including Lavender Dew Powder (for a more upmarket segment).

With growing demand, the company expanded by creating distribution offices in all major cities in the country, and set up additional manufacturing plants in present day Tamil Nadu. The company then began international distribution in South East Asia, establishing a distribution chain in Singapore.

By the time of Das' death in the 1960s, the company had become amongst the most well-known and recognisable businesses in the South Asian region. It was also known for the manufacture of a number of important chemical compounds that were essential to industrial processes.

After his death, his younger brother, Jagadish Chandra Dasgupta took over the business as Chairperson.

== Personality ==
K.C. Das was a renown figure in Calcutta, and was a lifelong believer in the Swadeshi philosophy and continued to be staunchly anti-British even post-Independence. Since his return from the United States and Japan, he chose to wear only Khadi clothing.

He was immensely popular in the Baidya community as well, providing scholarships to a number of young boys who came to Calcutta for their education. He was intensely committed to the ideals of entrepreneurship, and was known to dislike the idea of 'service'. At the time of his funeral, a number of people came forward and recounted how, on his walks around the lakes in Calcutta, Das would stop them and encourage them to give up the idea of looking for a job and start something of their own - no matter how small. Often he would provide the seed capital for the ventures, and never asked for the money back.

== Trivia ==
- While he was staunchly anti-British, K.C. Das' only son married the daughter of noted Solicitor Susil C. Sen CBE, a lawyer who had very close ties to the British government.
- His family name is Dasgupta, but being staunchly against the caste system, his father dropped the 'Gupta' which associated them with the Baidya community.
- K.C. Das gave an opportunity to Debu Barik, the owner of a small eatery behind Bijoli Cinema in Calcutta, to run the canteen at the Calcutta Chemical Company office in Panditia Road, recognising an entrepreneurial spark in him. That eatery is now the famous Bijoli Grill, one of the most popular restaurants for Bengali food in the country.
- K.C. Das is the grandfather of noted columnist and Rajya Sabha MP Swapan Dasgupta.
