= Swapan Dasgupta =

Indian journalist and politician (born 1955)

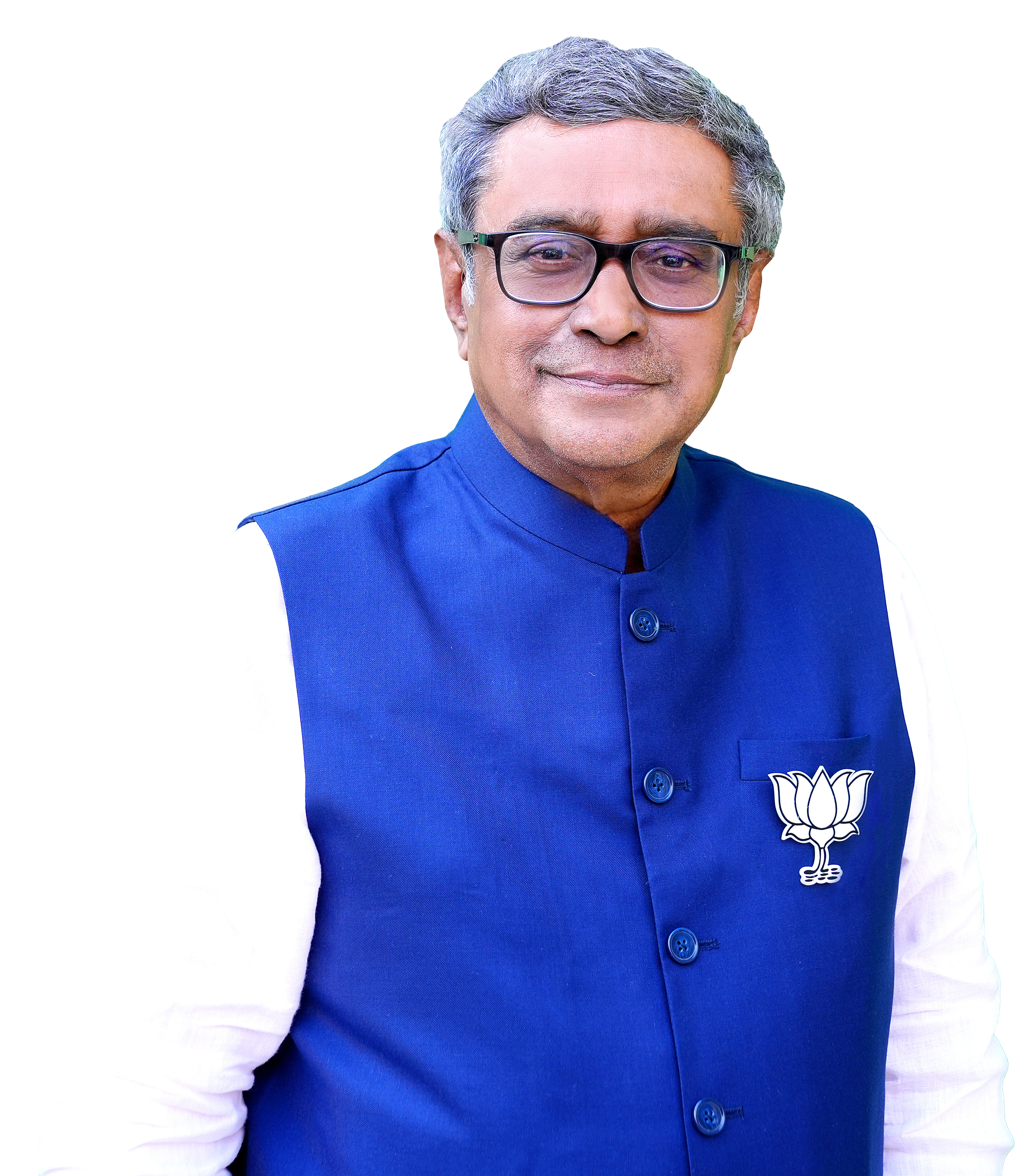
- Dasgupta in 2026

Finance Minister of West Bengal
- Incumbent
- Assumed office 1 June 2026
- Governor: R. N. Ravi
- Chief Minister: Suvendu Adhikari
- Preceded by: Chandrima Bhattacharya (Minister of State)

Member of West Bengal Legislative Assembly
- Incumbent
- Assumed office 4 May 2026
- Preceded by: Debasish Kumar
- Constituency: Rashbehari

Member of Parliament, Rajya Sabha
- In office 1 June 2021 – 24 April 2022
- Constituency: Nominated (Journalism)
- In office 25 April 2016 – 16 March 2021
- Succeeded by: Himself
- Constituency: Nominated (Journalism)

Personal details
- Born: 3 October 1955 (age 71) Kolkata, West Bengal, India
- Party: Bharatiya Janata Party (since 2016)
- Spouse: Reshmi Dasgupta
- Children: 1 son
- Education: St. Stephen's College, Delhi (BA); SOAS University of London (MA, PhD); Nuffield College, Oxford (Postdoctoral Fellow)
- Occupation: Journalist, Writer, Political analyst
- Awards: Padma Bhushan (2015)

Swapan Dasgupta (born 3 October 1955) is an Indian politician, journalist, and former historian. He is one of the leading spokespersons of the Indian right-wing, notable for writing columns for leading English dailies espousing Hindu nationalism. He is currently serving as the Cabinet Minister for Finance of West Bengal.

Since June 2026, he is the Finance Minister of the West Bengal Government and a member of the West Bengal Legislative Assembly representing the Rashbehari Assembly constituency. He was twice a nominated member of the Rajya Sabha, between April 2016 and March 2021, and June 2021 and April 2022. He resigned from the upper house to contest the Tarakeswar seat on a Bharatiya Janata Party ticket in the 2021 West Bengal Legislative Assembly Elections. He lost to AITC's Ramendu Sinharay by a margin of 7,484 votes.

In 2015, Dasgupta was conferred with the Padma Bhushan for his contribution to literature and education.

== Early life and education ==
Dasgupta was born into a prominent Bengali Baidya family on 3rd October 1955 in Calcutta, West Bengal. His father was Samarendra Chandra Dasgupta, and his grandfather was Khagendra Chandra Das, founder of the Calcutta Chemical Company. He received his schooling from St. Paul's School and La Martiniere Calcutta before graduating with a Bachelor's in History from the St. Stephen's College in 1975. He earned his MA and Ph.D. in History (South Asian Studies) from the School of Oriental and African Studies, graduating in 1980. He was awarded the Inlaks scholarship in 1982 to pursue a Junior Research Fellowship at Nuffield College, Oxford, where he also taught South Asian Politics. During this time, an excerpt from his thesis concerning the intersectionality of local politics in the Midnapur district was published in one of the Subaltern Studies volumes. He also briefly worked in a management position at his family's organisation, Calcutta Chemical Company, prior to his short stint at Oxford and following his completion of his doctoral studies in London.

== Career ==
Dasgupta has served in editorial positions over several English dailies in India including The Indian Express, The Times of India, The Statesman, India Today etc. He is a frequent guest on news channels in English-language debates on Indian politics and international affairs.

In February 2015, Swapan Dasgupta was appointed on the Board of Directors of Larsen and Toubro as a nominee of the Unit Trust of India. He stepped down from Directorship of Larsen and Toubro upon being appointed to the Rajya Sabha.

He was conferred Honorary Visiting Professorship at Center for Media Studies (CMS) at Jawaharlal Nehru University (JNU) in recognition to his excellent expertise on journalism and media.

Dasgupta led the first edition of the Delhi University Literature Festival as its festival director alongside Sanjeev Sanyal as the festival patron in March 2023.

=== Intellectual writings ===
Dasgupta's works have been centered on Indian Conservatism, Nationalism and Ideological Formation of the Hindu-right. In 2019, he wrote Awakening Bharat Mata: The Political Beliefs of the Indian Right, which is a collection of essays on the historical and intellectual roots of Hindu Nationalism and the formation of Conservative politics in India. This book discusses the connection between Indian nationhood, the cultural legacy of Hindus and the contemporary political ideas.

== Politics ==
Dasgupta started as a Trotskite during college but became a Thatcherite in England; since then, he has self-identified with centre-right politics. Dasgupta has been active in national politics, especially as a political commentator in English dailies, since the early 90s as a member of the Bharatiya Janata Party (BJP). By 1996, he supported the Ram Rath Yatra to forge a common Hindu identity. He claimed that "the BJP's positions on Ayodhya were forced upon it by the passions of its Hindu constituency." Later, he had also come in support of the Mandal Commission recommendations. However, in a 1990 article for the Times of India, Dasgupta called the Mandal Commission "a grotesque caricature of Hinduism."

Mushirul Hasan, writing in 1997, held him the chief spokesperson of BJP in the English language press. In the early 2000s, Dasgupta blogged:

The Right is an endangered community in India's English-language media. I happen to be one of the few to have retained a precarious toe-hold in the mainstream media.

Throughout these years, Dasgupta emphasised the value of the English language in reaching out to the elites, who were allegedly mass-committed to the left-liberal cause, and winning them over towards Hindutva; he was one of the most fierce critics of the pro-vernacular policies followed by the communist government of West Bengal.

=== Legislation ===
In April 2016, the incumbent BJP government nominated Dasgupta to the Rajya Sabha as an eminent personality in literature; his term would have continued till 2022. However, in 2021, Dasgupta resigned from Rajya Sabha to contest the Legislative Assembly election in West Bengal for BJP from Tarakeswar; he lost by 7,484 votes. A month later, Dasgupta was renominated to the Rajya Sabha for the remainder of his original term — opposition politicians and constitutional scholars questioned the legal soundness of the renomination.

He contested in 2026 West Bengal Legislative Assembly election for BJP from Rashbehari Assembly constituency and won by a margin of 20,865 votes.

On 1 June 2026, he was sworn in as a Cabinet Minister of West Bengal, along with twelve other members.

== Reception ==
Meera Nanda finds Dasgupta among India's most prominent center-right public intellectuals. Arvind Rajagopal found Dasgupta among the most vocal enthusiasts for the spread of Hindutva in English language press in the 80s. Scholars have located parallels between his writings and the thought school of Hindu nationalist organisations.

== Awards ==
- India
  - Padma Bhushan (2015)

== Personal life ==
He is married to Reshmi Ray Dasgupta, Lifestyle Editor at The Economic Times and has a son, Soumya Srijan Dasgupta, who is a practicing lawyer in the Supreme Court of India. They reside in Kolkata.

== Bibliography ==
- Awakening Bharat Mata: The Political Beliefs of the Indian Right. India: Penguin Random House. 2019. p. 440. ISBN 9788185990309.
- The Ayodhya Reference: The Supreme Court Judgement and Commentaries. India: South Asia Books. 1995. p. 208. ISBN 9780670091690.

== See also ==
- Arun Shourie
- Rajeev Malhotra
- Sanjeev Sanyal
- Bibek Debroy
- J Sai Deepak
- Vikram Sampath
