= Rashbehari Assembly constituency =

Constituency of the West Bengal Legislative Assembly, in India

Rashbehari
- Constituency No. 160 for the West Bengal Legislative Assembly
- Interactive Map Outlining Rashbehari Assembly Constituency

Constituency details
- Country: India
- Region: East India
- State: West Bengal
- District: Kolkata
- Lok Sabha constituency: Kolkata Dakshin
- Established: 1957
- Total electors: 205,959
- Reservation: None

Member of Legislative Assembly
- 18th West Bengal Legislative Assembly
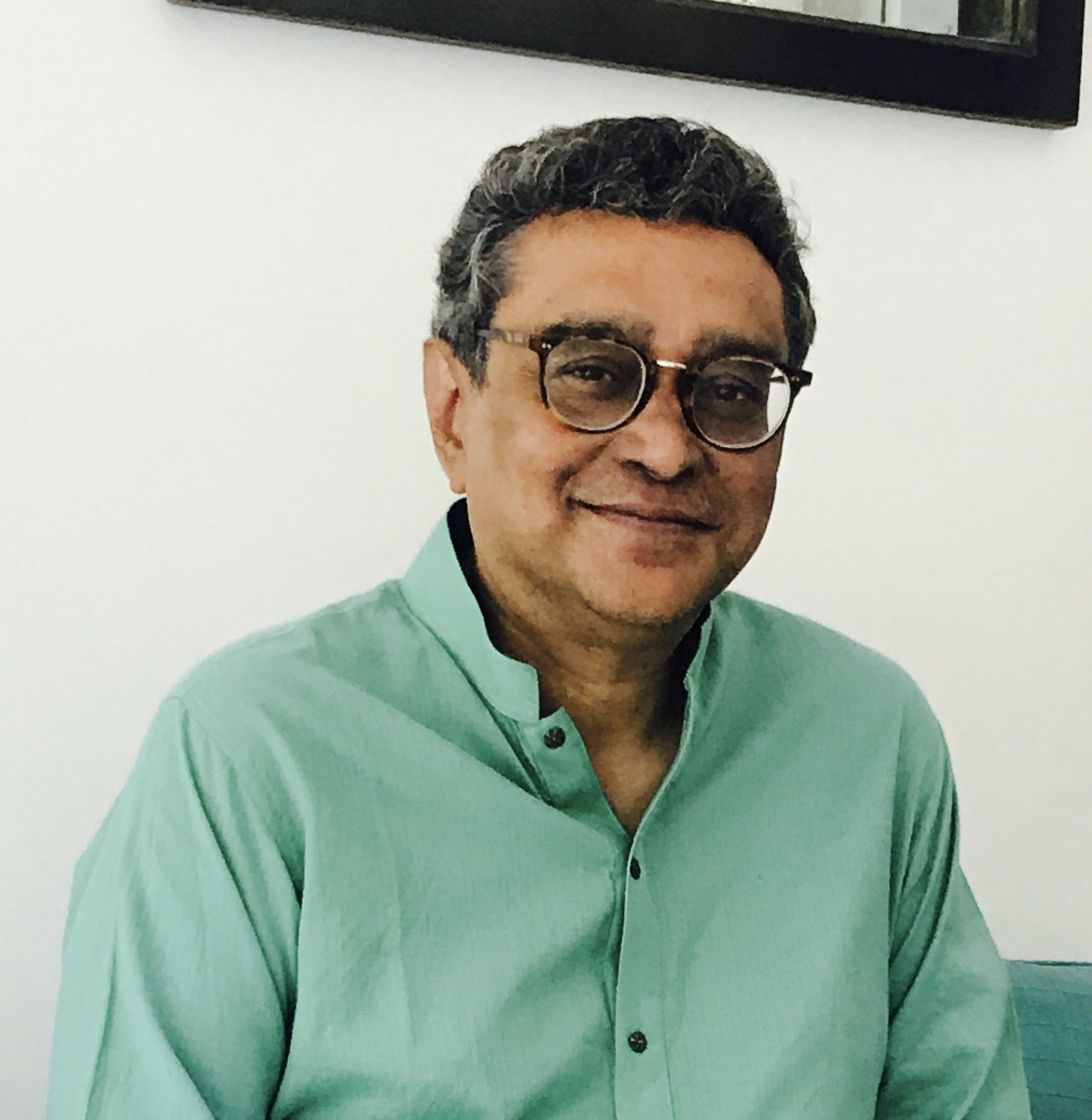
- Incumbent Swapan Dasgupta
- Party: Bharatiya Janata Party
- Elected year: 2026

Rashbehari Assembly constituency is a Legislative Assembly constituency of Kolkata district in the Indian state of West Bengal.

== Overview ==
As per order of the Delimitation Commission regarding the Delimitation of constituencies in West Bengal, Rashbehari Assembly constituency is composed of the following:

- Ward Nos. 81, 83, 84, 86, 87, 88, 89, 90 and 93 of Kolkata Municipal Corporation.

Borough	Ward No.	Councillor	2021 Winner
X	81	Jui Biswas	Trinamool Congress
VIII	83	Probir Kumar Mukhopadhyay	Trinamool Congress
VIII	84	Paromita Chatterjee	Trinamool Congress
VIII	86	Saurav Basu	Trinamool Congress
VIII	87	Manisha Bose	Trinamool Congress
VIII	88	Mala Roy	Trinamool Congress
X	89	Mamata Majumdar	Trinamool Congress
VIII	90	Chaitali Chattopadhyay	Trinamool Congress
X	93	Mousumi Das	Trinamool Congress

Rashbehari Assembly constituency is part of No. 23 Kolkata Dakshin Lok Sabha constituency.

== Members of the Legislative Assembly ==
Election Year	Name of M.L.A.	Party affiliation
1957	Sunil Das	Praja Socialist Party
1962	Bejoy Kumar Banerjee	Independent
1967	Bejoy Kumar Banerjee	Independent
1969	Bejoy Kumar Banerjee	Independent
1971	Lakshmi Kanta Basu	Indian National Congress
1972	Lakshmi Kanta Basu	Indian National Congress
1977	Ashok Mitra	Communist Party of India (Marxist)
1982	Hoimi Basu	Indian National Congress
1987	Hoimi Basu	Indian National Congress
1991	Hoimi Basu	Indian National Congress
1996	Hoimi Basu	Indian National Congress
1998^	Sovandeb Chattopadhyay	Trinamool Congress
2001	Sovandeb Chattopadhyay	Trinamool Congress
2006	Sovandeb Chattopadhyay	Trinamool Congress
2011	Sovandeb Chattopadhyay	Trinamool Congress
2016	Sovandeb Chattopadhyay	Trinamool Congress
2021	Debasish Kumar	Trinamool Congress
2026	Swapan Dasgupta	Bharatiya Janata Party

== Election results ==
=== 2026 ===
2026 West Bengal Legislative Assembly election: Rashbehari
Party	Candidate	Votes	%	±%
BJP	Swapan Dasgupta	74,123	53.40	▲17.81
AITC	Debasish Kumar	53,258	38.37	▼14.42
CPI(ML)L	Manas Ghosh	5,618	4.05	
INC	Ashutosh Chatterjee	2,427	1.75	▼6.54
NOTA	None of the above	1,296	0.93	▼0.41
Majority		20,865	15.03	▼2.17
Turnout		138,814	87.53	▲27.12
BJP gain from AITC		Swing		

=== 2021 ===
2021 West Bengal Legislative Assembly election: Rashbehari
Party	Candidate	Votes	%	±%
AITC	Debasish Kumar	65,704	52.79	
BJP	Lt. Gen. (Dr.) Subrata Saha	44,290	35.59	+18.63
INC	Ashutosh Chatterjee	10,314	8.29	−25.3
NOTA	None of the above	1,662	1.34	
Majority		21,414	17.2	
Turnout		124,455	60.41	
AITC hold		Swing		

=== 2016 ===
2016 West Bengal Legislative Assembly election: Rashbehari
Party	Candidate	Votes	%	±%
AITC	Sovandeb Chattopadhyay	60,857	44.15	−21.40
INC	Ashutosh Chatterjee	46,304	33.59	New
BJP	Samir Banerjee	23,381	16.96	+13.19
None of the Above	None of the Above	3,872	2.81	New
SUCI(C)	Swati Ghosh	1,335	0.97	
Majority		14,553	10.56	−26.23
Turnout		1,37,857	66.94	−0.72
AITC hold		Swing	-21.40	

=== 2011 ===
2011 West Bengal Legislative Assembly election: Rashbehari
Party	Candidate	Votes	%	±%
AITC	Sovandeb Chattopadhyay	88,892	65.60	
CPI(M)	Santanu Basu	38,998	28.76	
BJP	Jiban Kumar Sen	5,108	3.77	
LJP	Mita Biswas	1,059	0.78	
Majority		49,894	36.84	
Turnout		1,35,603	67.66	
AITC win				
