= Liluah =

Liluah Lillooah
- Neighbourhood
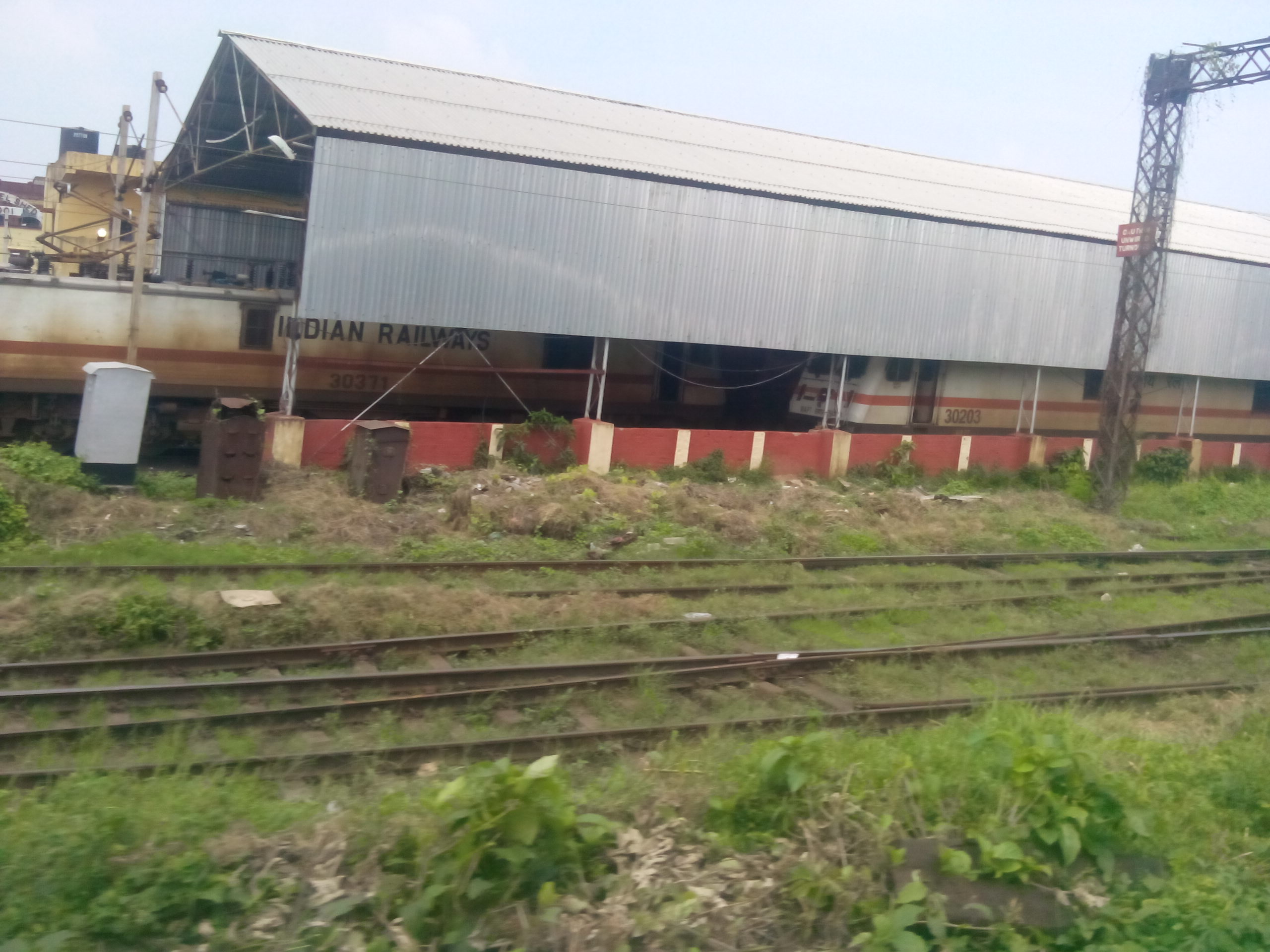
- Liluah Workshop & Car Shed

- Location in West Bengal, India Liluah (West Bengal) Liluah (India)
- Coordinates: 22.62106°N 88.33941°E
- Country: India
- State: West Bengal
- Division: Presidency
- District: Howrah
- City: Howrah
- Metro Station: Howrah

Government
  - Type: Municipal Corporation
  - Body: Howrah Municipal Corporation
- Elevation: 13 m (43 ft)

Languages
  - official: Bengali, English
- Time zone: UTC5:30 (IST)
- PIN: 711203, 711204
- Telephone code: +91 33
- Vehicle registration: WB
- HMC wards: 58, 59, 60, 62, 63, 64, 65, 66
- Lok Sabha constituency: Howrah
- Vidhan Sabha constituency: Bally
- Climate: Humid (Köppen)
- Avg. summer temperature: 42 °C (108 °F)
- Avg. winter temperature: 09 °C (48 °F)

Liluah is a neighbourhood in Howrah of Howrah district in the Indian state of West Bengal. It is a part of the area covered by Kolkata Metropolitan Development Authority (KMDA). Liluah has a railway junction, which is the first station after Howrah station under the Eastern Railway (India). Its history dates back to the British era when the Liluah Carriage and Wagon Workshop was set up to release pressure off Howrah.

== Location ==
Liluah is located at 22.62106°N 88.33941°E at an elevation of 13 m from MSL. It is located between Salkia and Belur.

== Transportation ==
=== Air ===
Nearest airport is Netaji Subhash Chandra Bose International Airport in Dumdum, Kolkata.

=== Road ===
Liluah is well connected with round the clock buses, auto-rickshaws and e-rickshaws. Grand Trunk Road (part of State Highway 6), crosses through the eastern half of the town. The eastern half is well linked to the western half by a rail overbridge known as Lilluah Bridge. It can also be accessed by Benaras road (the route followed by the Bhattanagar–Esplanade Minibus). Liluah can be accessed by Private Bus route number 51, 54 and 56. It can also be accessed by Minibuses on Satyabala-Ruby Hospital, Bally Khal-Khidirpur, Belur Math-Esplanade, Malipanchghara-Sealdah/Rajabazar, Bhattanagar-Esplanade and CSTC Bus (S32A, S23A, S23, C23) on Belgharia (Rathtala)-Howrah Station (via G.T. Road).

==== Inter-town road transportation ====
Auto-rickshaw, e-rickshaws as well as cycle-rickshaws are available for inter-town transport. Worth mentioning is that the western part of Liluah relies largely on autos and totos for public transportation, due to the absence any major bus route. Though the Bhattanagar-bound Minibus plys through that part, its frequency is quite low and its route goes through the southern fringes of western part (Gadadhar Bhatta Road, Jheel Road, A Road, N.S. Road). As for the eastern part, large number of public buses ply along the G.T. Road throughout the day.

=== Railway ===
Liluah railway station is part of the Kolkata Suburban Railway. It also has a Railway Carriage and Wagons Workshop: one of the three in the Eastern Railways. The other two being at Kanchrapara and Jamalpur. The Liluah Railway station has 5 platforms with 3 mainly being used for the Howrah-Bardhaman main line and the other two for the Howrah-Bardhaman chord line. The Belur Math Line branches off between Liluah and Belur. There is also Bhattanagar railway station which is present at the extreme western outskirts of Liluah (in the farmlands of Chakpara, to the west of Bhattanagar locality). There is also a line connecting Liluah and Andul in the South Eastern Railways, used by Goods trains and few Express trains. It takes 8 minutes to travel from Howrah to Liluah (a distance of 5 km) by a suburban local train. But the same journey takes 10 minutes when going from Liluah To Howrah due to bulk railway traffic coming in and out of Howrah station which is the oldest and biggest railway junction in India.

== Administration ==
Liluah falls under the jurisdiction of Howrah Municipal Corporation since 10 July 2015. Before July 2015, Liluah was under the former Bally Municipality which was later merged with the HMC.

There are two police stations in Liluah under Howrah City Police i.e. Liluah Police Station and new Belur Police Station(In the Lilluah Railway Colony). All areas of Liluah west of the western side of Howrah-Bardhaman railway line (i.e. Howrah-Bardhaman chord line and Howrah-Bardhaman main line) fall under the Liluah Police Station, situated on the Jheel Road. It also has jurisdiction over some areas beyond the town, while the eastern part of Liluah was earlier under the Bally Police Station until 2013. After that, it came under the new Belur Police Station, which also has jurisdiction over some areas of Belur. It also has an outpost near Belur Math. It is located in The Liluah Railway Colony.

There are two post offices in Liluah: in the eastern parts of the town Liluah Post Office PIN Code - 711204 and in the western parts of the town Liluah Shibtala Sub Post Office PIN Code - 711204 and Bhattanagar Post Office PIN Code - 711203, for the eastern and western parts of the town respectively. Some of the western parts of the town are also served by Belur Math Post Office.

== The town ==
The railway line divides Liluah into 2 parts (eastern part and western part). Until 2008 these two halves were connected by a level railway crossing near the Liluah railway station, since 2008 both these parts were joined by a rail overbridge constructed above Liluah railway station. The town once used to be an industrial hub, with many small industrial units (mainly iron and steel rolling mills) dotting the small town due to its proximity to Howrah, an industrial city and Calcutta, being a major city of that time, a condition similar to any other suburb of Calcutta during the British Raj these industrial units dominated the locale of the town throughout the mid-20th century, when Liluah was known only for industries, factories and workshops. Since the mid-1990s many of the factories in the eastern and western parts of the town were gradually closed. They were gradually replaced by residential or commercial buildings. Until the first decade of the 21st century, most of the factories in the eastern half of Liluah had disappeared and the eastern part of the town now a primarily commercial, residential and educational area, dominated by markets, shops, schools and malls. This part of Liluah has rapidly evolved since the last two decades, as it passes through G.T. Road from Howrah, you come across glittering shops and restaurants of 'Don Bosco Area' and RD Mall, further north, there is the century-old Liluah Railway Colony, made by the British in the first decade of the 20th century. Although Liluah still has many industries remaining, but some are also being gradually replaced by residential buildings.

== History ==
Liluah, or Lillooah as it was then written, was the depot of the former East Indian Railway [EIR]. The case of unfortunate shipwreck bringing EIR's first loco and mis-despatch of ship carrying EIR's first coaches for inauguration of first railroad in Eastern India led the E.I.R. authorities to consider manufacture of rolling stock in India (read the history of ER).

Initially EIR had set up in 1853 a locomotive and carriage workshop near the Howrah Station (somewhere near the salt gola) with the idea of maintenance of assets after inauguration in 1854 and was later shifted to its present site in the year 1900 as the site did not meet the requirement in terms of magnitude of work. The locomotive portion was shifted to a new and much bigger workshop at Jamalpur in 1862 and the Howrah works was upgraded to a carriage and wagon workshop in 1863. As the Howrah location was found unsuitable for further expansion, the facility was finally shifted to its present site. The Liluah Carriage and Wagon Workshop is located in the suburbs of Howrah about 7 km. from Howrah. It is the largest combined carriage and wagon workshop of Indian Railways.

The prime responsibility of this workshop was to manufacture rolling stock. This excluded locomotives. Only carriages and wagons were initially manufactured. During the last century Liluah had efficiently discharged the duties. Manufacturing of coaches were done till 1972, and Liluah has 3000 coaches to its credit. Wagon manufacturing was, however, discontinued in the post independence era, and coach manufacturing was also stopped when sufficient infrastructure was built throughout the country to cater for the ever-growing demand.

Another interesting fact which is less known is that apart from rolling stock manufacture Liluah made immense contribution to the war machinery of Allied Forces during the Second World War. Apart from rolling stock required for transport of military equipment, Liluah also produced hundreds of Ambulances, Water Cars, tanks, armoured vehicles and lorries. Ammunitions were also produced for the British Army, the Indian Army and Royal Air force. Minor items like tent pegs etc. were also in thousands. All the above illustrates the technical expertise and skill developed within the workshop. An essay published in 1945 in East Indian Railway Magazine by D.K. Whitworth describes how great a job was done by railwaymen at Liluah between 1938 and 1942.

Like other leading Indian railways, the EIR provided a full regiment for the Railway Units of the Auxiliary Force (India). Liluah, or Lillooah as it was written then, was the home of the 1st Bn., the East Indian Railway Regiment.

Fateh Chand Badhwar OBE, MBE (Mil.) (1900–1995) the first Indian to become the chairman of the Railway Board had a stint at the Liluah Carriage and Wagon Workshop, during its early days.

A township was planned near the workshop for the British officers, working in the workshop, which gradually, until 1913 became The Liluah Railway Colony. The roads in the colony still bear the names of the British engineers who worked in the workshop. Until the mid-1900s, Liluah had become a dusty industrial town. The Colony is commonly used by locals for their morning walks now.

Post-independence, Liluah saw the development of many small industrial units and thus rapid expansion beyond the western half of the town, areas which were earlier farmlands, resulting in unplanned development. As a result of which, many people came to Liluah from Bihar and Uttar Pradesh as labourers in the small industrial units and gradually settled here; these people came to Kolkata in search of job opportunities, a condition experienced by all suburbs of Calcutta during the early post independence era; this resulted in significant ethical change in Liluah, which resulted in the majority Hindi-speaking population of Liluah since the late 1990s, in a contrast to the early 1990s, when most of the population was Bengali-speaking.

== Education ==
The area of Eastern Liluah has been the educational hub of Howrah since the early 1990s, owing to a number of schools, an Engineering College and a Science, Arts and Commerce College present there.

=== Schools ===
The Don Bosco High and Technical School Liluah or Don Bosco Liluah (abbreviated as DBL) which was established in the year 1937 as a Catholic institution by the Salesians of Don Bosco, along with the Agrasain Balika Siksha Sadan (ABSS) and the M.C. Kejriwal Vidyapeeth an institution run and operated by the MCKV Group of Institutions, the group which also runs the MCKV Institute of Engineering are situated in Liluah. Apart from these three schools, the Sohanlal Deoralia Balika Siksha Sadan, established in the year 1962 is one of the oldest girls educational institution in Howrah, with the medium of instruction there primarily being Hindi. Apart from these, the Sunrise Eng. Med. School, which was established in the year 1975, run and operated by the Sunrise Education Society, the I.P. Memorial School and the Rosebud School, both established in 1967 are also some of the oldest institutions in Liluah. Sudhir Memorial Institute, Liluah (Howrah) (SMIL), Little Wits (Pre-Primary Segment of Sudhir Memorial Institute Liluah) established in 2011 is another reputed CBSE School, run and operated by S.N.R.MEMORIAL TRUST and it is a segment of SNR Public School. Other schools like the Agrasain Boys' School, Imperial City School, Vels Global School, Liluah (Howrah), the Bharatiya Higher School and the Gurukul School are all located within a radius of less than 2 kilometers within the 'Don Bosco Area' (Abhay Guha Road Commercial Area) of Eastern Liluah. The Florence Day School (Privately run), The Eastern Railway Hindi High School and the Eastern Railway Bengali High School are Central Government schools under the Ministry of Railways, affiliated to the CBSE, present in the Liluah Railway Colony. Apart from these, institutions like the Holy Family Convent School, Swaika Girls High School, Liluah T.R.G.R. Khemka High School, and the Bhattanagar Kulokamini Vidyamandir are located in western Liluah. Apart from these schools, the Mirpara Don Bosco Self Employment Research Institute (D.B.S.E.R.I) is also located in Western Liluah, which is an institution also run by the Salesians of DonBosco and it provides training in various Self-Employment skills to people. Other schools like the Belur Janta High School, the Belur Boys School, Belur Girls school and the Belur High School are located within half a kilometer off Liluah. Apart from that there are around a dozen more registered and unregistered primary schools in Liluah.

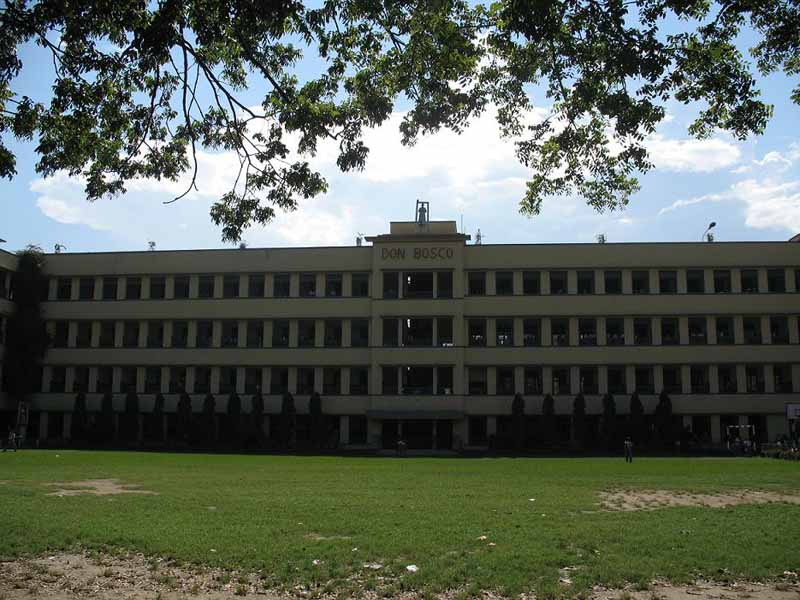
Don Bosco High and Technical School Liluah

- Don Bosco High and Technical School Liluah. Commonly abbreviated as DBL, was set up in 1937 by the salesians of Don Bosco mainly to train the local Christian population so that they could get jobs at the Liluah Railway Carriage and Wagon Workshop. The school has won the Telegraph School of the Year awards three times and is only the fourth school ever in Kolkata to enter the Hall of Fame. DBL celebrated its Platinum Jubilee on 8 December 2012, a lavish event which had eminent personalities from around India(many of its Alumni) visiting the school, including former President A.P.J. Abdul Kalam.
- Agrasain Balika Siksha Sadan is a girls school, affiliated to the Council for the Indian School Certificate Examinations (CISCE Board). It was established in the 1994 and as of 2019 has about 4500 students. The Agrasain Balika Siksha Sadan (or ABSS as it is commonly abbreviated) is one of girls educational institutions in Howrah and (along with DBL and MCKV). A section of the Duffer Street (on which the school lies, which was earlier named for Lord Dufferin) from G.T. Road to Matwala Chaurasta was renamed as 'Agrasain Street' in 2009. Large posters and sign boards commemorating the occasion are present near the gates of the institution. The Agrasain Boys' School [Established in 2011 and Inaugurated by Sri Arup Roy (Minister - Agricultural Marketing, Government of West Bengal) on 2 April 2012]: commonly abbreviated as ABS, a linguistic minority unaided institution having an independent Governing Body elected by the trust known as Agrasain Seva Samity, the same which also runs ABSS and Shree Agrasain College, built on a campus with a large play ground, and other facilities.
- Sudhir Memorial Institute, Liluah (Howrah) is affiliated to Central Board of Secondary Education (CBSE) till 10+2 (Class 12th) level. It was established in the year 2011 and as of 2022 it has more than 3000 students. Its Pre-Primary Segment is known as Little Wits (Classes Toddler to Infant-2). It is a franchisee school under Sudhir Memorial Institute Group of Institutions (SMI) which has various branches situated in various parts of West Bengal and also working on expanding its chain in the coming time. It is a segment of SNR PUBLIC SCHOOL and run by S.N.R MEMORIAL TRUST, Kolkata. Sudhir Memorial Institute, Liluah is a co-educational school.

=== Colleges ===
Apart from the many Schools present in Liluah, Liluah also boasts an undergraduate and postgraduate engineering college and an undergraduate science, arts and commerce college.

The MCKV Institute of Engineering (MCKVIE) was established in 1999 and runs as a part of the MCKV Group. It is affiliated to the West Bengal University of Technology. It offers bachelor's and master's degrees in various engineering streams. Shree Agrasain College is a self-financing undergraduate college run under the Agrasain Seva Samity, the same trust which runs the Agrasain Balika Siksha Sadan and the Agrasain Boys' School. It offers undergraduate degree and diploma courses in various science, arts and commerce courses. It is affiliated to the University of Calcutta and is located on Height Road near Liluah Railway Station, its second campus in Agrasain Street being converted to the Agrasain Boys' School in 2010.

The Lalbaba college is 1 km off Liluah near the famous Belur Math.

=== Universities ===
The Ramakrishna Mission Vivekananda University, an institution deemed to be university is located within 1 km from Liluah, near the Belur Math. It is administered by the Ramakrishna Mission. It was declared by Government of India as a Deemed University under Section 3 of UGC Act, 1956.

== Recreation ==
RD mall in Liluah (on G.T. Road) has a gross leasable area of 1 lakh square feet. It was launched in 2011 and houses Inox Multiplex, Domino's Pizza, Cafe Coffee Day, a gaming arena and Croma Electronics by Tata Groups among many other retail stores.

Other main market areas in the vicinity of the town are, Abhay Guha Road (locally called, Don Bosco Gully or Don Bosco area), Liluah Bazar and Belur Bazar. Local restaurants have recently housed alongside G.T. Road and include, Gangotri, Vegetarian Valley, Fusion, Bhikharam Chandmal alongside eateries inside RD Mall.

== Nearby ==
Belur Math is 1 km north-east of Liluah railway station.

== Notable people ==
- Babul Supriyo, Singer and MP from Asansol.
- Laxmi Ratan Shukla, Cricketer
- Ravi Shukla, Star Voice of India 2 Winner.
- Shreevats Goswami, Cricketer
- Iman Chakraborty, Singer
- Ishaa Saha, Actress

== Neighbourhoods ==
- Liluah West

Bhattanagar, Chakpara, Daspara, Liluah Bazar (Rabindra Sarani), Ghoshpara, Kumarpara, Mirpara, Patuapara, Arabindanagar, Suryanagar, Kolkata Prinjala Pole Society Liluah, Jora Mandir, GuhaPark.

- Liluah East

Don Bosco - MCKV Area (G.T. Road-Abhay Guha Road crossing), Railway Colony, Mahavir Chowk, Surendranagar, Malipanchghara, Guha Road.

== See also ==
- Eastern Railway Carriage and Wagon Workshop, Liluah
- Don Bosco Liluah
- Fateh Chand Badhwar
- Grand Trunk Road
- Liluah Railway Station
- Belur Math
