= Salkia =

- Neighbourhood
- Location in West Bengal, India Salkia (West Bengal) Salkia (India)
- Coordinates: 22°35′49.92″N 88°20′15.72″E
- Country: India
- State: West Bengal
- Division: Presidency
- District: Howrah
- City: Howrah
- Metro Station: Howrah Maidan and Howrah

Government
  - Type: Municipal Corporation
  - Body: Howrah Municipal Corporation
  - Mayor: Rathin Chakraborty
  - Police commissioner: Gaurav Sharma
- Elevation: 28 m (92 ft)

Languages
  - Official: Bengali, Hindi, English
- Time zone: UTC+5:30 (IST)
- PIN: 711106
- Telephone code: +91 33
- ISO 3166 code: IN-WB
- Vehicle registration: WB
- HMC wards: 1, 5, 6, 10, 11, 12
- Lok Sabha constituency: Howrah
- Vidhan Sabha constituency: Howrah Uttar
- Website: wb.gov.in

Salkia is a neighbourhood in Howrah of Howrah district in the Indian state of West Bengal. Salkia is under the jurisdiction of Golabari Police Station and Malipanchghara Police Station of Howrah City Police. It is a part of the area covered by Kolkata Metropolitan Development Authority (KMDA).

== Location ==
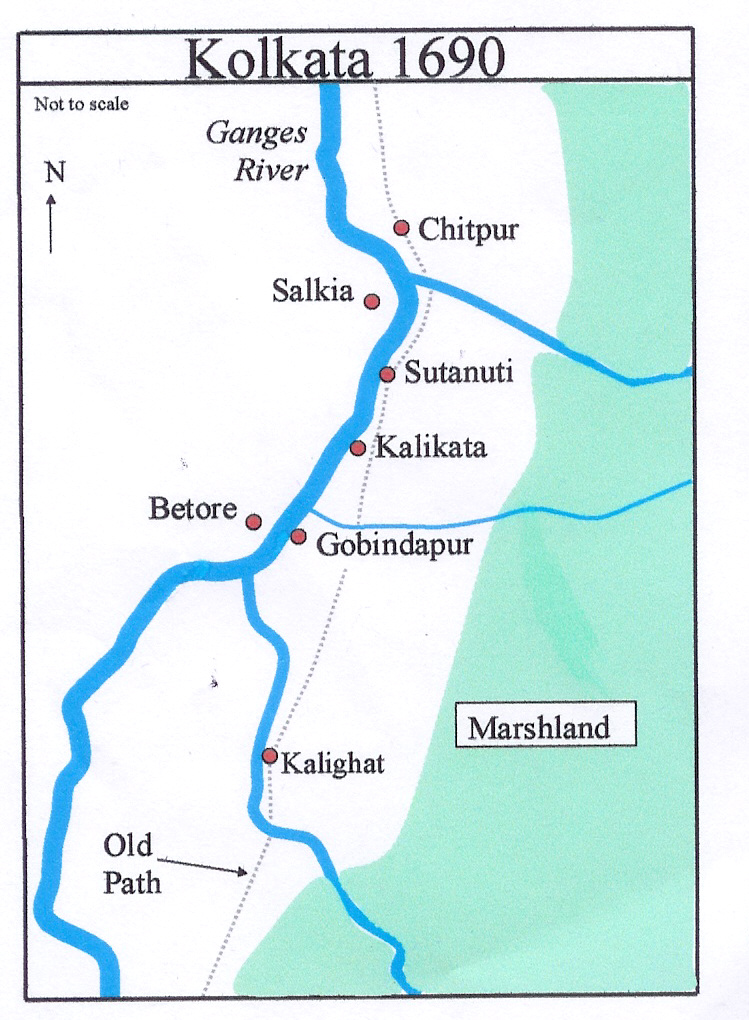
Salkia in the Map of Calcutta (1690)

Salkia is located on the west bank of Hooghly River. Pilkhana is on its south, Liluah and Ghusuri are on its north and Bamangachi is on its west.

== Market and recreation ==
Haragunge Bazaar is a century-old market, located at heart of North Howrah, on Aurobindo Road, Salkia. Aurobindo Road and Dobson Road are commercial streets in Salkia. Jelia Para Lane is one of the posh residential and commercial area of Salkia.

Aurobindo Mall in Salkia (on Aurobindo Road) has a gross leasable area of 1.20 lakh square feet. It was launched in 2017 and has major brands and several restaurants and a three screen multiplex of Miraj Cinemas.

== Transport ==
State Highway 6 (West Bengal)/ Grand Trunk Road passes through the west side of Salkia. Salkia School Road runs along the eastern part of Salkia.

=== Bus ===
==== Private Bus ====
- 24 Bandhaghat – Topsia
- 24A Bandhaghat – Topsia
- 51 Pardankuni – Howrah Station
- 54 Bally Khal – Esplanade
- 56 Ruiya Purbapara – Howrah Station
- 57A Chanditala – Howrah Station

==== Mini Bus ====
- 1 Bandhaghat – Esplanade
- 1A Satyabala – Ruby Hospital
- 2 Salkia – Esplanade
- 10 Bally Khal – Khidirpur
- 11 Belur Math – Esplanade
- 18 Kona – Esplanade
- 25 Malipanchghara – Sealdah/Rajabazar
- 30 Baluhati – Esplanade
- 39 Bhattanagar – Esplanade

==== CSTC Bus ====
- S32A Belgharia (Rathtala) – Howrah Station

==== Bus Routes Without Numbers ====
- Bandar (Dhanyaghori) – Howrah Station

=== Train ===
Howrah Station is the nearest railway station. Liluah railway station and Tikiapara railway station also serve the residents.

=== Ferry ===
Salkia has two ferry ghats on the banks of Hooghly River named Golabari Ghat and Bandhaghat Ghat, with regular ferry services at 15-minute intervals.
