= Don Bosco High & Technical School, Liluah =

Private school in West Bengal, India

Coordinates: 22.619317°N 88.352824°E

Don Bosco School, Liluah
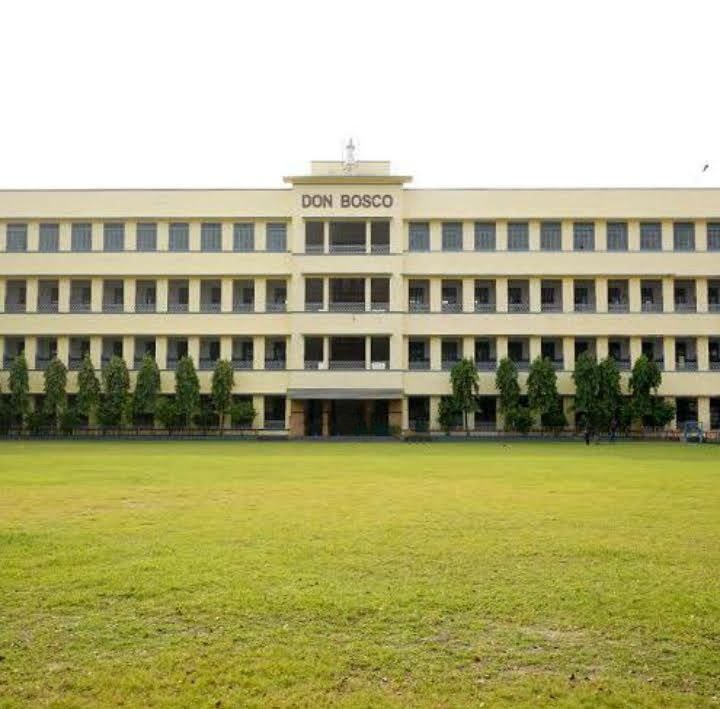
- Abhay Guha Road, Liluah, Howrah-711204

Information
- Type: Private; minority
- Motto: Virtus et Labor (Virtue and Labour)
- Established: 8 December 1937; 88 years ago
- Rector: Fr. Sanjay Manohar, SDB
- Principal: Fr. Sanjay Manohar, SDB
- Grades: Nursery to 12th grade
- Enrollment: 4000
- Affiliation: Council for the Indian School Certificate Examinations (CISCE)
- Bursar: Fr. A. Anand Raj, SDB
- Website: donboscoliluah.org

Don Bosco Technical & High School, Liluah is an all-boys, English medium school located in Howrah, India. It operates under the Council for the Indian School Certificate Examinations and takes students from the lower kindergarten through grade twelve. The school was established in 1937, and is run by the Salesians of Don Bosco (SDB) a minority institution within the Catholic Church. The school's patron saint is John Bosco, popularly known as Don Bosco. The motto of the school is "Virtus et Labor".The school celebrated its Platinum Jubilee in December 2012.

== History ==
Don Bosco Liluah emblem

The land for the school was bought in 1928 by the Salesian Provincial, and the church was built in 1937. It became the first parish church in the country dedicated to Saint John Bosco. The technical school was begun in 1937 and started functioning in 1939. The school was closed for four years from 1942 to 1946 for use by the army during the Second World War.

The government recognized it in August 1948, and in 1954 the first batch of students appeared for the Senior Cambridge Exams. In July 1958, the school auditorium was inaugurated. The Archbishop of Calcutta inaugurated the main building of the school in November 1959.

In January 1977 the Free Night School was started, to cater to the needs of the poor children of the locality. The first inter-schools cultural and co-curricular festival named as "Bosco Blow Up" was held in September 1977, with seven participant schools. Don Bosco Self-employment was started in August 1978 for the young men of the locality who are school drop-outs to enable them to learn a trade and earn their livelihood.

The new parish church was blessed in December 1984 by K.A. Joseph, the Salesian Provincial in the presence of Mariano Uguet, who had been instrumental in acquiring and setting up the institution, and Attilio Colussi, the first rector. A computer centre was set up in December 1986, and the following year the school celebrated its Golden Jubilee, with a function presided over by the governor of West Bengal Nurul Hasan.

In 1997, the school celebrated its diamond jubilee with a grand function presided over by the governor of West Bengal, K. V. Raghunatha Reddy. The 1990s also saw the commissioning of the north-eastern four storey building for the boarding pupils and the renovation of the Technical School building.

=== Platinum jubilee celebrations ===
In 2012, Don Bosco celebrated its platinum jubilee with an eight-day festival held on the school grounds. A statue of Don Bosco was inaugurated by Rachhpal Singh, Minister of Tourism for West Bengal. Many past rectors and Salesians of the school were present, including Peter Lourdes, a student in the first cohort.

=== Rectors ===
- A. Colussi (1937–39)
- M. Ferarrio (1940-40)
- T. Lopez (1940–41)
- L. Buri (1941–49)
- J. Bacchiarello (1950–51)
- A. Buccieri (1952–56)
- M. Uguet (1956–62)
- R. Stroscio (1962–65)
- P.J. Sheehy (1965–67)
- R. Maiques (1967–70)
- A.J. Sebastian (1970–76)
- P.P. Varkey (1976–79)
- C.A. Joseph (1979–85)
- B. Fernandes (1985–91)
- J. Manippadeth (1991–95)
- D. Kachira (1995-2000)
- C.J. George (2000–05)
- J. Pathickal (2005–11)
- Biji Thomas (2011–2016)
- Tommy (2017–2019)
- T.S. Gomes (2019 – 2022)
- Davis Veliyen (2022- 2024)
- Sanjay Manohar Kujur (2024- )

== Academics ==
The method of education followed in the school is the Salesian Preventive System taught and practised by John Bosco. It is based on the three pillars of Reason, Religion and Loving Kindness.

The school operates under the Council for the Indian School Certificate Examinations. Its 10th year students take Indian Certificate of Secondary Education (ICSE) Examinations and those in the 12th years take Indian School Certificate (ISC) Examinations. Don Bosco Liluah received the Calcutta Telegraph School of the Year award for "commitment to all-round excellence" in 2007, 2010, 2011 and 2015.

From the 1965 graduating class, Baren Ray placed first All-India in the IIT JEEE. Of the nine students graduating that year four were accepted to the IITs and one, V.J. Zachary, a boarding student from Allepey, Kerala joined BITS Pilani. The inspiration for them was Maurice Nicholson who established the Physics and Chemistry laboratories for the first time when the new building was completed in 1959. With Nicholson's dedication, A.L Ananthnarayan in 1962 and Sukhminder Grewal in 1965 won the JBNSTS scholarships and went on to IIT Kharagpur for their BTech with Nicholson leading the science department, Don Bosco Liluah sent many students each year to the IITs. Maninder Grewal at ITT JEE Rank 24 in 1968 and a threesome of Bhatt, Bhatt and Bagaria followed a year later. Academic excellence continues at Don Bosco Liluah with Anurag Poddar placing 3rd in the all-India rankings for the 2013 ISC examinations by scoring 98.50%. The highest rank in ISC 2018 was secured by Rishav Jalan (99.25%).

== Facilities ==
The school's four storey main building with a statue of John Bosco on its roof was described in 1970 as the tallest building in Liluah. It houses classrooms as well as the school library; music room; eight science and language laboratories; and an examination hall (which also doubles as multimedia teaching hall). The school auditorium seats 1500 people. The school complex has a Reverse Osmosis Water Purification Unit and emergency power generator capable of running the entire school. There are two playing fields, a series of gardens known as the Infant Jesus Park, and a combined basketball and tennis court (added as part of the 2012 Platinum Jubilee). The school also offers digital classes for the students.

== Extra-curricular activities and events ==
The school has 14 clubs and youth groups which organize activities for their members. The Boy Scouts is open to all students, while membership in the other clubs is open to students of Class 3 and above, with some more options to choose from for classes 9 and above. Every club has a special "Club Week" where it organises various club-related events for students of all classes. These events include debates, quizzes, science exhibitions, sports tournaments and singing and dance competitions. Each club also handles the organisation and management of several events in "Boscotsav", the annual school fest. Sports available at the school include basketball, cricket, football, volleyball, table tennis, and karate, with coaching facilities for the first three. The football team competes against other local schools and at district-level. The school team won the district championship organized by TTIS in 2010 and the Savio Cup organized by Don Bosco School Park Circus in the same year.

Other extra-curricular activities include: a quiz team, which competes with local schools and in citywide competitions; a chess team, which participates in state-level and inter-school level competitions; and a debating team, which finished as national runners up in the 2008 "Debating Matters India" conducted by the British Council and the Institute of Ideas. The school's Model United Nations team won the top award of Best Delegation along with several other awards at LMCMUN 2009, organised by La Martiniere Calcutta in association with the West Bengal Federation of the United Nations Association, the first ever Model United Nations organised in Eastern India. The school's annual magazine, The Canvas, is a collection of sketches, prose, poetry and accounts, created by the students.

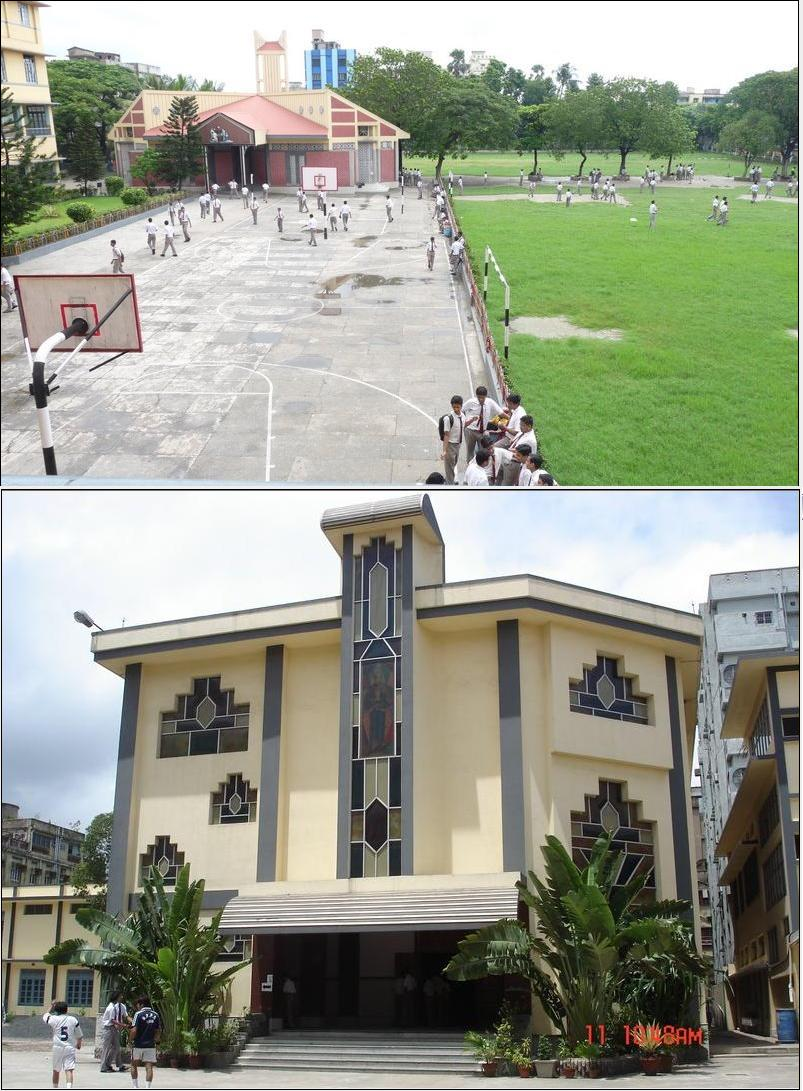
top: Church, courts and fields; bottom: Auditorium

Apart from the club weeks, there are also many other annual events organised in the school for special occasions. Two of the most important are the Rector's and Parents Day and the Sports Day. Other events include the Inaugural Ceremony at the beginning of every academic year, Rabindra Jayanti Celebrations, Investiture Ceremony, May Day, Annual Award Ceremony, Independence Day and Republic Day, Christmas Celebrations, Foundation Day, and Farewell for Class 12. Fetes are also organised for Teachers Day and Children's Day.

The bicentenary of the birth of Don Bosco was celebrated with grandeur in Don Bosco Liluah. The South Asian Salesian Congregation was held on 26, 27, and 28 September at Netaji Indoor Stadium, Kolkata.

== Night School and other social services ==
Don Bosco Night School was started in 1976 by a group of past pupils and educates under-privileged young people in the area. It was staffed by Biji Thomas, the then rector, and Soumen Mark James along with ten other teachers. After finishing their night school course, a few students go on to join the National Institute of Open Schooling for their 10th and 12th standards. Under the Adult Education project, adults receive education and literacy instruction. The school is a National Institute of Open Schooling centre.

A free medical unit is run by the Past Pupil's Association. Its doctors provide free treatment to local poor people. Free medicines are distributed every Sunday. Students of Don Bosco High & Technical School help by contributing during the Medicine Drives.

== Church ==
Don Bosco Church (St. John Bosco Church) in Liluah was established in 1937, becoming the first parish in India dedicated to St. John Bosco. It was blessed by Archbishop Ferdinand Perier to serve the European and Anglo-Indian Catholics of the Liluah Railway Colony. The church has since expanded its community. A new church building was consecrated in 1985, replacing the original structure. The associated Don Bosco High & Technical School founded in coexistence with the church in 1937, emphasizes education for underprivileged youth and has grown into a significant educational institution in the region.

== Notable alumni ==
- Ravi Shukla, winner of 2008 STAR Voice of India 2
- Babul Supriyo, Bollywood singer and Member of Parliament
- Appachu Ganapati, who was awarded the Vir Chakra by the govt.of India for his achievement in downing enemy fighter planes.^{[20]}

== See also ==
- List of schools in Howrah
