= Pilkhana, West Bengal =

Pilkhana
- Neighbourhood
- Location in West Bengal, India Pilkhana (West Bengal) Pilkhana (India)
- Coordinates: 22°35′39″N 88°20′19″E
- Country: India
- State: West Bengal
- Division: Presidency
- District: Howrah
- City: Howrah
- Metro Station: Howrah Maidan and Howrah

Government
  - Type: Municipal Corporation
  - Body: Howrah Municipal Corporation
- Elevation: 28 m (92 ft)

Languages
  - Official: Bengali, English
- Time zone: UTC+5:30 (IST)
- PIN: 711101, 711106
- Telephone code: +91 33
- ISO 3166 code: IN-WB
- Vehicle registration: WB
- HMC wards: 10, 12, 13, 15, 16
- Lok Sabha constituency: Howrah
- Vidhan Sabha constituency: Howrah Uttar
- Website: wb.gov.in

Pilkhana is a neighbourhood in Howrah of Howrah district in the Indian state of West Bengal. Pilkhana is governed by Golabari Police Station under Howrah City Police. It is a part of the area covered by Kolkata Metropolitan Development Authority (KMDA).

== Location ==
Pilkhana is located on the west bank of Hooghly River. Howrah Maidan is on its south, Salkia is on its north and Tikiapara is on its west. It was the slum about which Dominique Lapierre's bestselling book City of Joy was written. Pilkhana has at least tens of thousands of residents. It is near to Howrah Station. A Haliman High School exists here. The area has significant Hindu and Muslim populations. Pilkhana is of industrial character. It is a part of Howrah Uttar (Vidhan Sabha constituency). The Salesians of Don Bosco are present in Pilkhana.

== Transport ==
State Highway 6 (West Bengal)/Grand Trunk Road passes through the west side of Pilkhana. Maulana Abul Kalam Azad Road and Salkia School Road run along the middle and eastern part of Pilkhana respectively. All these three roads are connected with Dr. Abani Dutta Road.

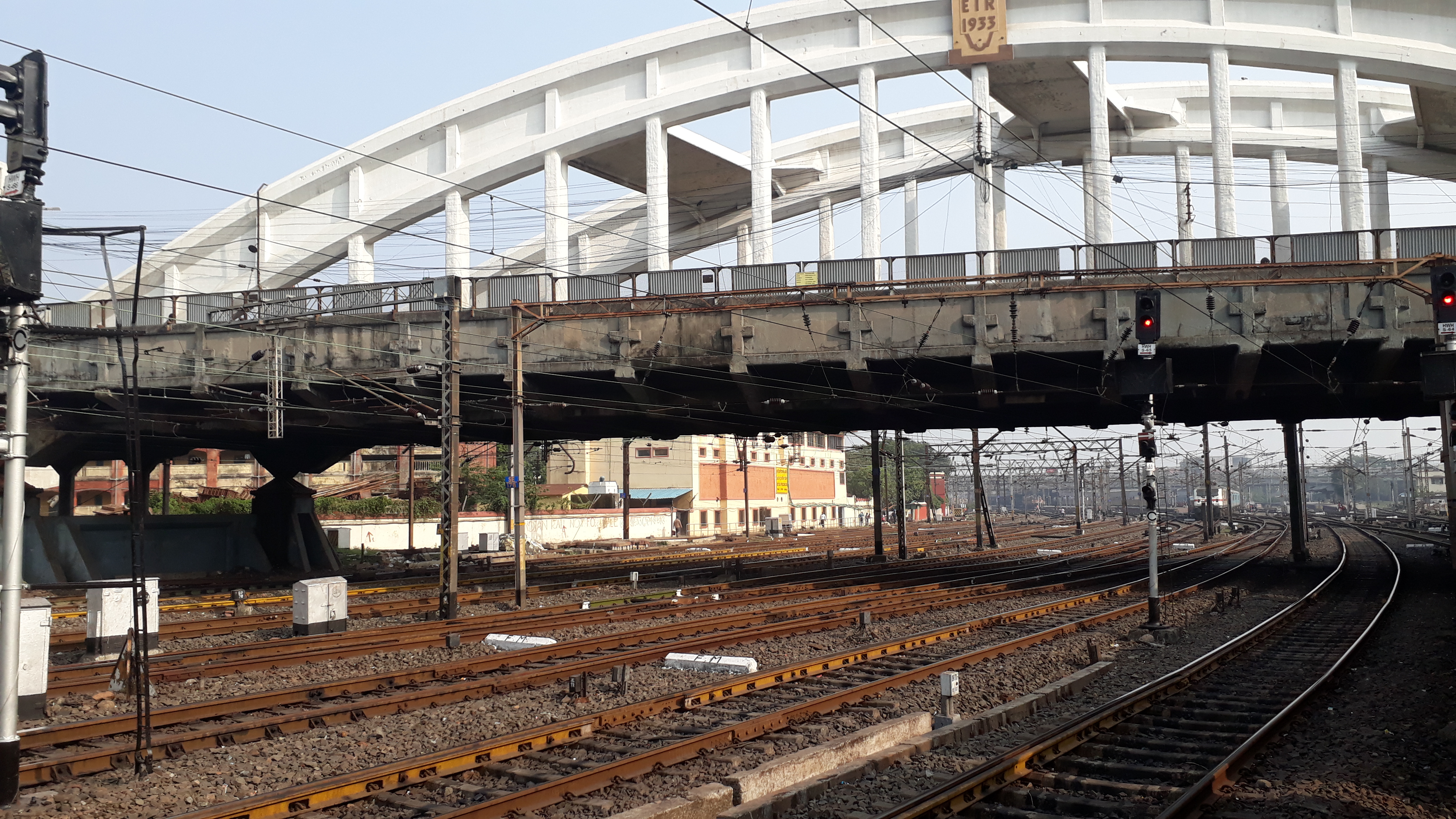
Bangal Babur Bridge

Pilkhana is connected to Howrah Maidan and South Howrah with a Rail Overbridge, Chandmari Bridge, commonly known as Bangal Babur Bridge. This bridge was opened in 1933 by East Indian Railway Company (EIR) and was named after Bangal Babu (Zamindar Ramjatan Bose).

=== Bus ===
==== Private Bus ====
- C Howrah Fire Station - Park Street
- 24 Bandhaghat – Topsia
- 24A Bandhaghat – Topsia
- 24A/1 Howrah Fire Station - Mukundapur
- 51 Pardankuni - Howrah Station
- 54 Bally Khal – Esplanade
- 56 Ruiya Purbapara - Howrah Station
- 57A Chanditala - Howrah Station

==== Mini Bus ====
- 1 Bandhaghat – Esplanade
- 1A Satyabala – Ruby Hospital
- 2 Salkia – Esplanade
- 10 Bally Khal – Khidirpur
- 11 Belur Math – Esplanade
- 18 Kona – Esplanade
- 25 Malipanchghara – Sealdah/Rajabazar
- 30 Baluhati – Esplanade
- 39 Bhattanagar – Esplanade

==== WBTC Bus ====
- C24 Ghasbagan - Rajabazar
- S32A Belgharia (Rathtala) - Howrah Station

==== Bus Routes Without Numbers ====
- Bandar (Dhanyaghori) - Howrah Station

=== Train ===
Howrah Station is the nearest railway station.

=== Ferry ===
Pilkhana has a nearby ferry ghat named Golabari Ghat on the banks of Hooghly River with regular ferry services at 10 min interval.
