= Chakapara =

Chakpara
- Census Town
- Location in West Bengal, India Chakpara (West Bengal) Chakpara (India)
- Coordinates: 22.63°N 88.35°E
- Country: India
- State: West Bengal
- District: Howrah
- Elevation: 14 m (46 ft)

Population (2011)
  - Total: 35,282

Languages
  - Official: Bengali, English
- Time zone: UTC+5:30 (IST)
- Vehicle registration: WB
- Lok Sabha constituency: Sreerampur
- Vidhan Sabha constituency: Domjur
- Website: howrah.gov.in

Chakpara is a census town in Bally Jagachha CD Block of Howrah Sadar subdivision in Howrah district in the Indian state of West Bengal. Chakpara is under the jurisdiction of Liluah Police Station of Howrah City Police.

== Geography ==
Chakpara is located at 22.63°N 88.35°E. It has an average elevation of 14 metres (46 feet).

== Demographics ==
As per 2011 Census of India Chakpara had a total population of 35,282 of which 18,352 (52%) were males and 16,930 (48%) were females. Population below 6 years was 3,623. The total number of literates in Chakpara was 27,897 (88.12% of the population over 6 years).

As of 2001 India census, Chakpara had a population of 24,212. Males constitute 52% of the population and females 48%. Chakpara has an average literacy rate of 75%, higher than the national average of 59.5%; with male literacy of 79% and female literacy of 70%. 11% of the population is under 6 years of age.

== Transport ==
=== Bus ===
==== Mini Bus ====
- 39 Bhattanagar - Esplanade

=== Train ===
Chakpara has a railway station (Bhattanagar Railway station) on its western side. The station is mainly used by Freight trains. No Express train stops here. To avail Local Train, one has to go to Liluah Railway Station, which is the nearest railway station. Tikiapara, Dasnagar and Kona railway stations are also within 5 km from Chakpara. Totos are available from chakpara to tikiapara railway station.
