= Ishmeet Singh =

Ishmeet Singh Sodhi
- Ishmeet Singh

Background information
- Born: Ishmeet Singh Sodhi; 2 September 1988; Ludhiana, Punjab, India
- Died: 29 July 2008 (aged 19) Malé, Maldives
- Genres: Playback singing, Indian classical music
- Occupation: Singer
- Instrument: Vocalist
- Years active: 2007–2008
- Website: ishmeetinstitute.com

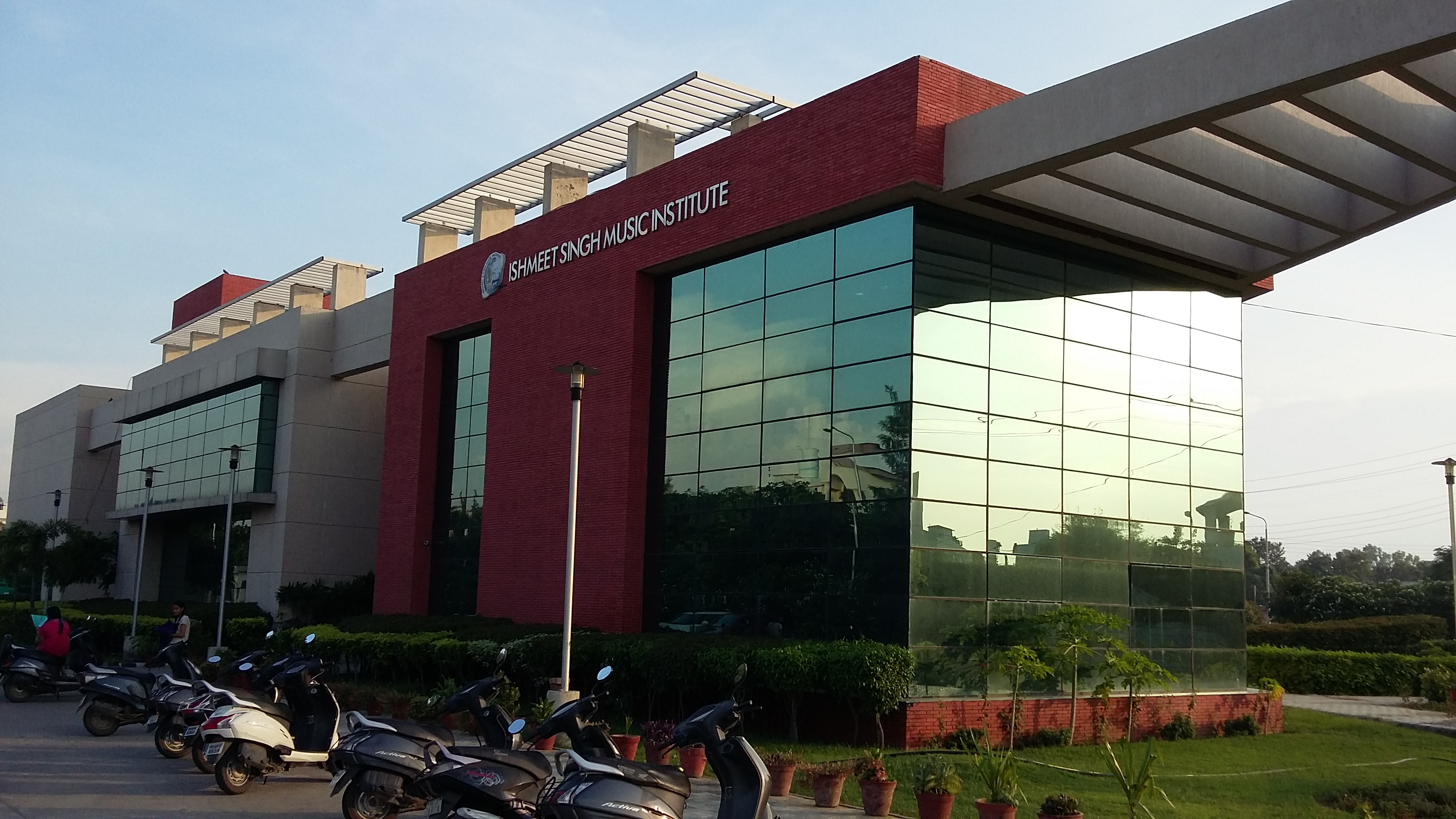
Ishmeet Singh Music Institute

Ishmeet Singh (2 September 1988 – 29 July 2008) was a winning singer on the STAR Plus show Amul STAR Voice of India. Hailing from Model town, Ludhiana of Punjab, Ishmeet won the Star Plus show in 2007 and also participated in another reality show called Jo Jeeta Wohi Superstar. His first album was a religious Gurbani album called Satgur Tumre Kaaj Savaare.

He died by suspected drowning in Malé, Maldives on 29 July 2008. He was a second year student of MNC College, Mumbai.

== Early life ==
Singh was born on 2 September 1988 in Ludhiana, Indian Punjab to a Punjabi Sikh family: his father being named Gurpinder Singh and his mother Amritpal Kaur. He attended Guru Nanak Public School, Sarabha Nagar, Ludhiana and was a second year student at MNC College, Mumbai, pursuing a bachelor's degree in commerce. During his second reality show competition attempt he had promised his mother to study up to C.A. level.

Ishmeet received training in kirtan singing from Principal Sukhwant Singh, of Gur Shabad Sangeet Academy, Jawaddi Taksaal, Ludhiana and from his uncle Dr. Charan Kamal Singh, a professor at Guru Angad Dev Veterinary and Animal Sciences University, Ludhiana who supported him during the Amul Star Voice of India competition. He had learned how to sing, but was not trained to sing classical Indian music. This was evident and criticised during the Star Voice of India contest.

== Star Voice of India ==
Ishmeet Singh entered the Star Voice of India contest at the age of 17, making him one of the youngest competitors. He was one of top two finalists and won the title on 24 November 2007. He was given the winner's trophy by singer Lata Mangeshkar. He was also one of the contestants of Jo Jeeta Wohi Superstar, a singing reality show on Star Plus, and represented the Champions' team. He was eliminated on 20 June 2008.

His style of singing was very similar to Bollywood singer Shaan. Shaan even said that when they were singing together he could not tell which lines he was singing himself. Although Ishmeet was from Punjab he made a conscious effort to sing more Hindi songs.

== Post – Star Voice of India ==
Ishmeet promised his community that he would release a Sikh religious album as his first, regardless of the result the Voice of India contest. Titled Satguru Tumre Kaaj Savaare it was released by BIG Music and contains six tracks;

- Satguru Tumre Kaaj Savaare
- Mera Maat Pita
- Mitar Pyare Nu
- Ram Japo
- Naam Japat Dukh Jaae
- Ek Noor

After releasing his initial religious album, Ishmeet joined a show titled Jo Jeeta Wohi Superstar, which would pit champions of Indian musical reality shows against each other.

He sang a Sikh hymn, Dithe Sabhe Thanv, for a Punjabi film, Sat Sri Akal. His voice was described as sounding very similar to Sonu Nigam's. When the film was released, Jagjit Singh spoke of Ishmeet as "an excellent singer. He had everything at an early age. In Sat Sri Akal he sang the shabad beautifully."

Ishmeet worked with Salim-Suleiman to produce a song called "Shukriya" and promoted this single with live performances. He toured Hong Kong, Bangkok and Malaysia and sang in concerts with members of the Voice of India competition, also singing kirtan in gurdwaras – his last performance in a gurdwara was with Veer Manpreet Singh.

Ishmeet was set to release a new album at the time of his death, having Lalit Pandit of the Jatin-Lalit duo as composer. Jatin Pandit announced he would try to get this album released.

== Death ==
In July 2008 Ishmeet visited the Maldives with fellow Star Voice of India contestants Sumitra and Vyom for a concert that was to be held on 1 August 2008. He was found drowned on 29 July 2008 in the hotel's swimming pool. Ishmeet Singh was staying at the Chaaya Island Dhonveli resort in Male.

His family demanded an enquiry due to possible manslaughter as his accomplices watched him drown and the event management company may have failed to "manage" the event properly. Webnewswire conducted an in-depth investigation on his death and suggested that there was foul play. The Punjab government ordered a police probe. The final post-mortem report will not be released before the viscera results are received.

Ishmeet's family have listed their concerns on the Ishmeet Singh Foundation website. His father, Gurpinder Singh, and uncle, Charan Kamal Singh, recently paid a three-day visit to the Maldives to investigate "unexplained" head injuries. His family members had earlier said that the post-mortem and forensic laboratory reports stated death was by drowning but later stressed "under noticed" injury marks on Ishmeet's forehead and temple. According to a report by ADK Hospital, Maldives, where Ishmeet was taken after his death, a linear cut on the forehead was recorded. The post-mortem report in India also mentions a blood clot, "hematoma", under his skin behind his right eye and blood froth in his nostrils and his mouth.

"We have inspected every nook and corner of the resort and the pool from every possible angle," said Charan Kamal Singh, a pathologist in Ludhiana. "The pool has no pointed surface that could lead to such an external injury," Ismeet's uncle stressed, "his injuries show inflammatory change. Inflammatory alterations cannot take place after a person's death and nor in a swimming pool. These injuries could have taken place only when he was outside the pool. Ishmeet was living but unconscious when he was slipped into the pool," he claimed.

According to The Indian High Commission, Maldives... Narayan Swami, first secretary, Indian high commission in Maldives, was not in the country while Ishmeet's family visited the Indian high commission there. However, Mr Thomas, the official spokesperson of the high commission told us, "Ishmeet's father and two uncles had visited Maldives. They met the police authorities and have requested for further enquires about the incident. So, the Indian high commission in Maldives has forwarded the family's request for further enquiries into the matter to the government of Maldives. The letter has already been forwarded. We are taking appropriate steps now, following Ishmeet's family's request." The case was investigated by CBI, who approached Professor T D Dogra of AIIMS for opinion.

=== Funeral ===
Rest In Power, Ishmeet Singh. Thousands of people, including commoners and celebrities, attended Singh's journey from his home to the cremation ground on 31 July 2008. Shops in the area closed out of respect for their star.

== Posthumous events ==
BIG Music released two albums in tribute to Ishmeet Singh, both of which contain songs that were recorded prior to his death. The first album is entitled Mool Mantar, and contains the first hymn of the Sikh holy scripture, Guru Granth Sahib.

The second album, titled We'll Miss You, contains around six tracks, including the popular song Shukriya:

We'll Miss You has been released on both CD and DVD, and is distributed worldwide.

Under the ISF banner, Principal Sukhwant Singh and Gurpinder Singh, father of Ishmeet, travelled to Malaysia to spread the message of the foundation. They stayed in the same room at the same hotel (Citrus Hotel) where Ishmeet stayed during his visit to Malaysia. They sang kirtan in Titiwangsa and Petaling Jaya Gurdwara where Ishmeet did the previous year, on the very same stage.

In 2010 the Ishmeet Singh Music Institute was established at Ludhiana in Singh's memory.
