= Ruchi Sharma (singer) =

Indian singer (born 1992)

- Born: 21 May 1992 (age 33)
- Origin: Bhiwani, Haryana, India
- Genres: Hindustani classical music, Filmi
- Years active: 2008 - present
- Website: Official site

Ruchi Sharma (born 21 May 1992 in Bhiwani, Haryana) is an Indian singer. She performed as Voice of Haryana in Top 24 of STAR Voice of India 2, a singing talent hunt produced by Sai Baba Telefilms, telecasted by Star Plus compered by Shaan in 2008.

== Biography ==
Ruchi was born to Anil Sharma and Geeta Sharma in Bhiwani, Haryana. Her parents hailing from Ghaziabad, Uttar Pradesh have a keen interest in classical music and singing.

== Music career ==
In 2007, she was selected in Top 20 of Amul Star Voice of India -Chote Ustaad, in its first season. Though she could not make it to the top, it was notably the turning point in her career.

She is now learning music from Bade Ustad Ghulam Mustafa Khan Sahab.

She started taking singing lessons from Yuva Ratna awarded Mr. Ritesh Mishra, son of Padm Bhushan Pt. Rajan Mishra in 2007. A year later, she performed with the highly regarded duo Pandits Rajan-Sajan Mishra who are exponents of Banaras Vocal Gharana. She also completed Sangeet Visharad in Indian Classical music, besides taking lessons of Hindustani Vocal from Mr. Gautam Mukherjee, son-in-law of Hemant Kumar in Mumbai.

She was a contestant in the first season of the show, Star Voice of India, Chhote Ustaad. However, her major breakthrough came in the second season of the show, where she performed in a good way but was eliminated.
