= MCKV Institute of Engineering =

Indian engineering college

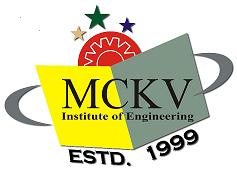
- Motto: Engineering Minds
- Type: Self funded
- Established: 1999
- Affiliations: MAKAUT
- Principal: Prof. Abhijit Lahiri
- Dean: Prof. Sudipto Chaki, Prof. Satadal Saha, Prof. Prasenjit Chatterjee & Prof. Arup Kr Jalan
- Faculty: 150
- Administrative staff: 70
- Students: 1500
- Location: 243 G. T. Road (N) Liluah, Howrah, West Bengal 711204; 22.5833°N 88.3833°E
- Campus: Urban
- Approvals: AICTE; Department of Higher Education, Government of West Bengal; NAAC
- Nickname: MCKVIE

VIE is an UGC recognised Autonomous Institute, accredited by NAAC with Grade 'A' and approved by AICTE. It is affiliated to Maulana Abul Kalam Azad University of Technology, West Bengal and offers NBA accredited programmes. The institute offers bachelor's and master's degrees in various engineering streams as well as in management studies. B.Tech. Students are admitted through West Bengal Joint Entrance Examination WBJEE, Joint Entrance Examination and Graduate Aptitude Test in Engineering. It had been selected for a TEQIP grant by the World Bank and also accredited by National Board of Accreditation. Also accredited by NAAC 'A' grade. The institute is located in Liluah, Howrah, West Bengal, India.

== Institute ==
The institute provides four year Bachelor of Technology (B.Tech.) degrees in Automobile Engineering, Computer Science and Engineering, Electronics and Communication Engineering, Mechanical Engineering, Electrical Engineering and Information Technology. It provides two year Master of Technology (M.Tech.) in Electronics and Communication Engineering, Computer Science and Engineering . Computer Science and Engineering and Electronics and Communication Engineering are accredited by National Board of Accreditation It also offers three years Master of Computer Applications (MCA) course under West Bengal University of Technology It is one of only a few colleges that offers the Automobile Engineering course. And was the first institute under West Bengal University of Technology, and the first of its kind in East India, to start a new course in Automobile Engineering.

The institute is recognized by the Directorate of Technical Education, Government of West Bengal and is All India Council for Technical Education (AICTE) approved. It is managed by the Sri Chhaganlal Kejriwal, Mirzamal Chhaganlal Kejriwal Charity Trust.

At Baja Saeindia 2007, India's first ever vehicle design and build competition held in December 2007, at the National Automotive Testing and R&D Infrastructure Project facility in Pithampur, Madhya Pradesh, 27 teams were shortlisted out of 52 from all over India. The institute team, with an offroad vehicle, were runners-up in the Cost Award section due to the brilliant effort of the student Prasann Kumar Singh. The student was from Automobile department. Techwala a digital marketing consultant in Kolkata, maintains MCKVIE's social media and other technical area related to website.

== Library ==
The Central Library is housed in a sprawling hall with a sitting capacity for about one hundred and fifty members. It has a rich collection of more than 23,000 text books and reference works on all relevant subjects. The institute subscribes to a large number of national and international periodicals and local and national dailies which are available for the benefit of the readers. Some of the facilities include Reprography, Internet, educational CDs. The library is fully automated with Online Public Access (OPAC) facility. The Central Library has access to IEL Online which provides unlimited, full-text access to more than 2 million documents from over 1.7 million authors; 149 IEEE and IET journals, magazines and transactions; Proceedings from over 900 IEEE and IET annual conference; over 2000 approved and published IEEE standards; Weekly updates with more than 20,000 new articles added each month of publications of the Institute of Electrical and Electronics Engineers (IEEE). Provision of Book Bank facility for the B.Tech. students is another major service of the library. Digitized documents are available in the library as a teaching aid. Departmental libraries have been created for the benefit of the particular department.

== Student Chapters ==
  1. Institution of Engineering and Technology (professional society) (IET-UK Student Chapter)
  2. Computer Society of India (CSI Student Chapter)
  3. SAE International (SAE Student Chapter)

== Student life ==
The following activities are organised by the students and college.

=== Technical Fest ===
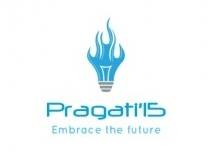
Pragati Logo

The students of the college organize a technical fest every year which sharpens their technical skills known as Pragati. Software competitions, paper presentations, programming in various languages, technical quiz, robotics and debate competitions are held. Technical colleges from all over the state participate in the competitions. Seminars and exhibitions are also held as a part of this program. It's sponsored by Institution of Engineering and Technology (professional society)

=== Technotica ===
The in house innovative technical project competition Technotica Organized every Year. The event was sponsored by IET UK Kolkata Network.

=== Swami Vivekananda Centre for Positive Thinking ===
Swamiji in College Campus

Swami Vivekananda Centre for Positive Thinking, the first centre in West Bengal, an initiative of MCKVIE faculties, staff members & students with the active advice of Ramakrishna Mission, Belur Math is dedicated to orient the students, faculties & staff members of the college through teachings, life giving thoughts and philosophy of Swami Vivekananda.

== See also ==
- West Bengal University of Technology
- Techno India University
- All India Council for Technical Education
- National Board of Accreditation
- University Grants Commission (India)
