= Ravi Shukla =

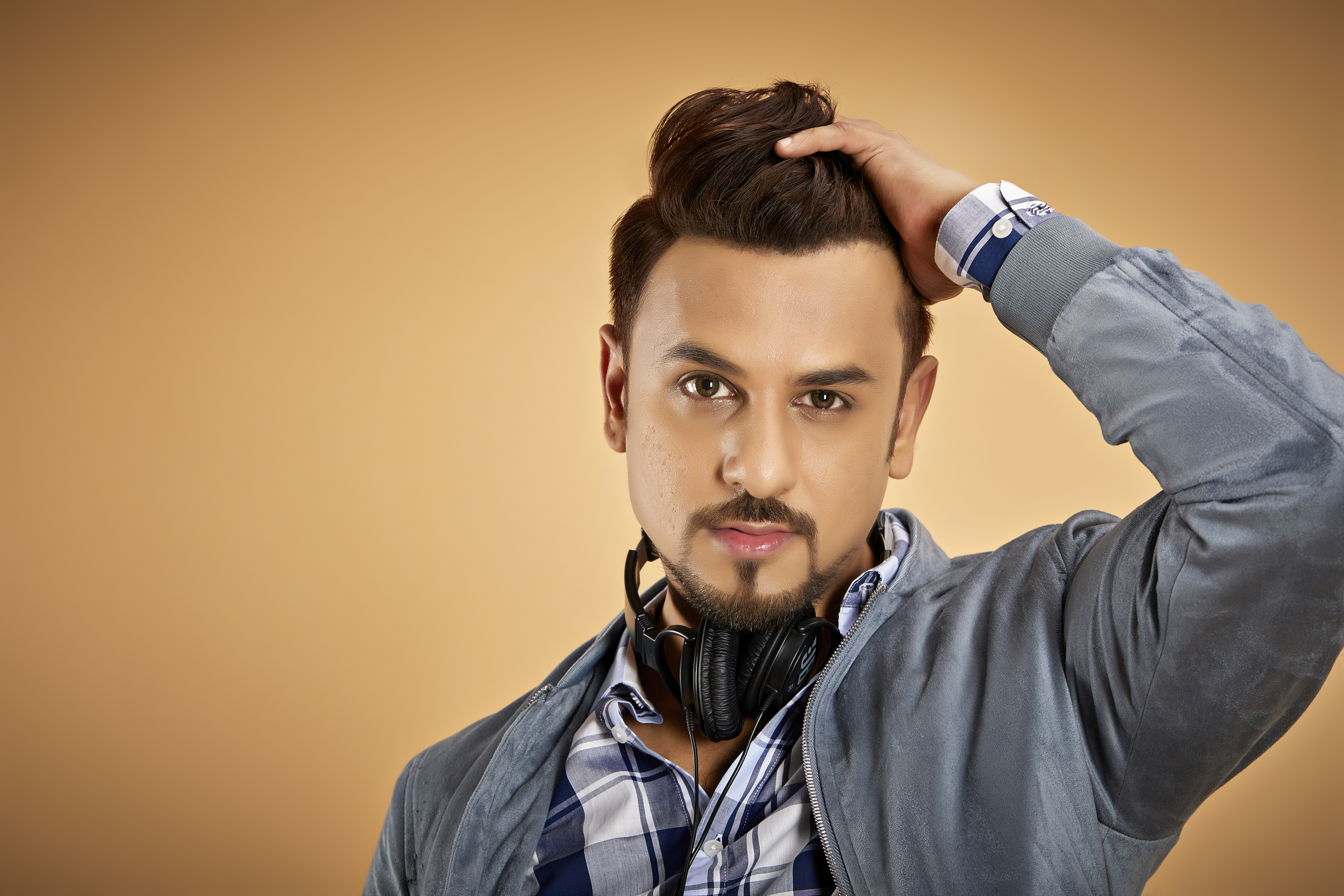

Ravi Shukla is an Indian entertainment personality from Kolkata, West Bengal. Ravi is a singer, songwriter, live show artist and performer won the Star Voice of India 2 (Season 2) competition 2008. Ravi K. Shukla was born on 4 November 1983 in Kolkata. His first appearance on the Indian pop music scene was during the 2004 season of the Indian Idol. He did not win the Season but that prompted Ravi to concentrate on a career in Music.
