= Star Voice of India =

- Also known as: Amul Star Voice of India
- Directed by: Gajendra Singh
- Starring: Shaan; Jatin Pandit; Lalit Pandit; Aadesh Shrivastava; Abhijeet Bhattacharya; Alka Yagnik; Neha Kakkar; Armaan Malik; Ash King
- Opening theme: "Star Voice of India" by Shaan
- Country of origin: India

Production
- Running time: 52 minutes
- Production company: Urban Brew Studios

Original release
- Network: STAR Plus
- Release: 18 May 2007 – 2021

Star Voice of India is an Indian television singing competition that premiered on 18 May 2007 and ended on 24 November 2007 on StarPlus. The show was directed by Gajendra Singh, creator of the Sa Re Ga Ma Pa series, and produced by Urban Brew Studios. It also featured judges from the Sa Re Ga Ma Pa series, Aadesh Shrivastava, Abhijeet Bhattacharya, Alka Yagnik, Lalit Pandit and Jatin Pandit. Shaan, who had previously been hosting Sa Re Ga Ma Pa. The winner of the show was Ishmeet Singh Sodhi.

== Star Voice of India ==
=== Prizes ===
The prizes offered to the winner were:-

- A contract for a personal album with Big Music
- A Chevrolet Car

=== Standard auditions ===
Auditions for the show were held in the Indian cities shown below. The judges chose 17 contestants out of the thousands that had auditioned and the 17 contestants performed on the first two episodes of the show.

The Auditions were held in the following cities in India each between the hours of 8:00 a.m. to 6:00 p.m. :

- Kolkata: Swabhumi 89 C, Maulana Abdul Kalam Avenue (700054) - 29 April
- Mumbai: Bhavans College, Munshi Nagar, Dadabhai Road, Andheri West - 4 May
- Indore: Hotel Fortune Land Mark, Vijaynagar, Indore - 5 May
- Delhi: Shankarlal Hall Delhi University Main Campus - 11 May
- Jaipur: Jai Club, Mahavir Marg, C Scheme, Jaipur - 12 May
- Lucknow: Ravindralaya Auditorium, Charbagh, Lucknow - 18 May

=== Shortcut to auditions ===
In addition, there was another way to audition from 1 May 2007 at 9:00 a.m. to 10 May 2007 at 11:59 p.m. that required the participant to be a subscriber and registered user of Hutchison Essar Telecom Limited ("Hutch"). The participant had to call 12399 from their Hutch mobile number and follow the instructions that required the participant to sing a song from their phone and leave personal details that were recorded. If the participant did not follow all the instructions given to them, the participant's entry was rendered null and void. Inaudible and unclear entries were also not accepted.

The participant was only allowed to sing Hindi songs with a duration of up to 60 seconds. Singing for longer than 60 seconds also rendered one's entry null and void.

Of all the participants that entered, the producers and representatives listened to a hundred randomly selected entries that were received during the contest and selected 5 winning participants that were believed to have the best voice among those who entered.

After five contestants were chosen, they were finally eligible to directly participate in the official auditions of the show held in Lucknow without having to wait in the queue for the auditions.

=== Top contestants ===
Contestants are noted here in reverse chronological order of elimination.

- Ishmeet Singh Sodhi - Ludhiana, Punjab (Winner) (Deceased 29 July 2008)
- Harshit Saxena - Lucknow, Uttar Pradesh (Runner-up)
- Abhas Joshi - Jabalpur, Madhya Pradesh (Jury's Choice) (Wildcard entry)
- Toshi Sabri - Jaipur, Rajasthan (Wildcard entry)
- Mohammed Irfan - Hyderabad
- Priyani Vani - Indore, Madhya Pradesh (Wildcard entry)
- Abhilasha Venkatachalam - Pune, Maharashtra (Jury's Choice-Female)

When the final 4 was: Ishmeet Singh Sodhi, Harshit Saxena, Mohammed Irfan, and Abhilasha Venkatachalam there was a wildcard entry allowing Abhas Joshi, Toshi Sabri, and Priyani Vani to renter the show

- Sumitra Iyer - Mumbai, Maharashtra
- Abhas Joshi - Jabalpur, Madhya Pradesh (Jury's Choice) (Wildcard entry)
- Mirande Shah - Ahmedabad, Gujarat
- Priyani Vani - Indore, Madhya Pradesh (Wildcard entry)
- Toshi Sabri - Jaipur, Rajasthan (Wildcard entry)
- Arshpreet Kaur - Ludhiana, Punjab
- Prantik Sur - Kolkata, West Bengal
- Prantika Mukherjee - Kolkata, West Bengal

=== Galas ===
In the galas, the contestants were distributed among two teams

| AGNI TEAM | PRITHVI TEAM |
|---|---|
| Abhas Joshi | Abhilasha |
| Mirande | Ishmeet |
| Harshit Saxena | Prantika |
| Sumitra | Prantik |
| Toshi Sabri | Priyani |
| Arshpreet | Irfan |

The Agni team was hosted by Lalit Pandit and Aadesh Shrivastava and the Prithvi team was hosted by Abhijeet Bhattacharya and Alka Yagnik while Jatin Pandit remained neutral.

- In Gala 1, all the 12 contestants performed on stage. This Gala introduced the viewers to the contestants' voting details.
- In Gala 2 Anil Kapoor and Akshay Khanna were the guest judges and every contestant sang song from Anil Kapoor's films.
- In Gala 3, the boys sang the songs of Kishore Kumar and the girls sang the songs of Asha Bhosle. Amit Kumar and his brother were the guest judges of the day. It was elimination day. Abhas, Prantika, Arshpreet and Prantik were in the danger zone but no one was eliminated.
- In Gala 4, the theme was love and all the contestants sang romantic songs.
- In Gala 5, everyone sang songs of their choice. It was elimination day. Prantika, Prantik and Abhilasha were in the bottom three and Prantika was eliminated.
- In Gala 6, everyone sang the songs of the music director Pritam Chakravarthy as he was the guest judge.
- In Gala 7, singer Sonu Nigam was the celebrity judge and all the contestants sang his songs. It was elimination day. Prantik, Irrfaan, Priyani and Toshi Sabri were in the danger zone and Prantik was eliminated.
- In Gala 8, Mahesh Bhatt, Pooja Bhatt and Mukesh Bhatt were the celebrity judges and all the contestants sang songs from their films or from films under the Vishesh Films' banner.
- In Gala 9, all the contestants sang singer Sunidhi Chauhan's songs. It was elimination day and the four contestants who came in bottom 4 were Mirande, Abhilasha, Sumitra and Arshpreet. The latter was eliminated.
- In Gala 10, everyone went to their roots in India as they sang regional songs from their respective regions. The guests were Jimmy Shergill, Preeti Jhangiani and Sonia Mehra, who all came to promote their movie Victoria No. 203.

=== Wild Card Entry ===
Eliminated contestants on the show were given another chance to prove their talent through a wildcard entry episode which was started on request of judge Jatin Pandit. Wildcard contestants were judged by renowned personalities of music industry.

The Wildcard Contestants were:

- Abhaas
- Priyani
- Toshi Sabri
- Arshpreet
- Prantik

On Friday, 5 October, Toshi Sabri, Abhas and Priyani made it to the top three among the wildcard contestants. Originally, the hosts had intended to select only two of these three, and Toshi Sabri and Abhas had scored the highest votes. Abhas had scored only 16 votes more than Priyani, hence all the judges revised their decision and pressed for Priyani to be brought back into the show, citing that a difference of 16 votes is negligible in a contest where hundreds of thousands of votes are sent.

=== Grand finale ===
The Grand Finale was held on 24 November 2007. Ishmeet Singh Sodhi was the winner and Harshit Saxena was the runner-up. From the South Zone, Harshit received 55% of the votes; in the East Zone, he received 52% of the votes and from the West Zone he received 60% of the votes. However, counting the North Zone votes, Ishmeet won. Also, Abhaas won the Jury Award.

=== Winner ===
The winner of the first Star Voice of India was thus officially declared as Ishmeet Singh, who hails from Punjab. After winning the show, he released a religious album called "Satgur Tumre Kwaaj Saware". He supposedly died in a drowning accident, on 29 July 2008. Evidence was found to say that he was murdered.

== Chhote Ustaad ==
The director, Gajendra Singh and production house, Urban Brew Studios, then continued the series with a version for juniors called "Amul Star Voice of India Chhote Ustaad," meant for children between the ages of 8 and 14. The series was hosted by Voice of India Jury-Award winner Abhaas Joshi and judges Shreya Ghoshal, Kunal Ganjawala, and Pritam.

=== Contestants ===
- Aishwarya (Winner) Announced by Amitabh Bachchan.
- Anwesha (Active - Runner Up: Second Place)
- Alpansh (Eliminated)
- Gitashree Shil (Amika Shail) (Eliminated)
- Shailey (Eliminated)
- Mansi Bhardwaj (Eliminated)
- Abeer (Eliminated)
- Areeb (Eliminated)
- Jayant (Eliminated)
- Vyom (Eliminated)
- Prakriti (Eliminated) (Wild Card Entrant)
- Sonia (Eliminated) (jury's choice award winner)
- Rigved (Eliminated) (Challenger)

=== Grand finale ===
The grand finale took place on 5 April 2008. Amitabh Bachchan and Juhi Chawla were the chief guests. Aishwarya was announced as the winner. Both Anwesha and Aishwarya are going to United States for a stage show.

The Grand Finale was hosted by Abhaas Joshi and Shaan.

== Season 2 ==
Star Voice of India 2 premiered on 18 July 2008. It Stands for Second Season of Gajendra Singh and Urban Brew's previous Show Star Voice of India. This season replaces all old judges with three new judges. The two finalists on the show were Ravi Shukla and Saptaparna Chakraborty.

A three-hour grand finale was held at the Andheri Sport's Complex in Mumbai on 21 December, in the presence of prominent singers like Jagjit Singh, Ila Arun and Sonu Nigam. During the course of the finale, the finalists conducted several performances and were often joined by their former rivals, in a spirit of co-operation and unity. A special remembrance video was assembled to remember the late Ishmeet Singh, who was the first winner of Star Voice of India series. In order to sustain his memory, the show presented the first Ishmeet Singh Singing Award to Ronit Sonar of Assam, a contestant on the show.

At the end of the show, Ravi Shukla of Delhi was crowned the winner by guest Sonu Nigam. As part of the winner's package, Ravi was awarded a brand new Chevrolet car along with a cheque for Rs. 2.5 million. In addition to the bonus gift, Ravi was awarded an exclusive contract with T-Series to launch his first album. Both Ravi and Saptaparna were awarded trophies by their "gurus", Monty Sharma and Ismail Darbar respectively.

=== Host ===
- Shaan

=== Judges ===
- Sukhwinder Singh
- Ismail Darbar
- Monty Sharma

=== Contestants ===
| Contest Number | Contestant Name | Place | Status (Running/Eliminated) |
|---|---|---|---|
| 1 | Apapbidya Chakraborty | Kerala | Eliminated |
| 2 | Amitabh Narayan | Bihar | Eliminated |
| 3 | Argha Dutta | Tamil Nadu | Eliminated |
| 4 | Arvind Dhandwaal | Himachal Pradesh | Eliminated |
| 5 | Debarati Bhattacharjee | Tripura | Eliminated |
| 6 | Kanika Joshi | Uttaranchal | Eliminated |
| 7 | Mahipal Singh Rathore | Rajasthan | Eliminated |
| 8 | Mallar Karmakar | West Bengal | Eliminated |
| 9 | Mangesh Boregaonkar | Goa | Eliminated |
| 10 | Mukul Soni | Madhya Pradesh | Eliminated |
| 11 | Rahul Mukharjee | Maharashtra | Eliminated |
| 12 | Ravi Shukla | Delhi | Winner |
| 13 | Rithisha Padmanabh | Karnataka | Eliminated |
| 14 | Rohit Sonar | Assam | Eliminated |
| 15 | Ruchi Sharma (singer) | Haryana | Eliminated |
| 16 | Ryan Dias | Andhra Pradesh | Eliminated |
| 17 | Saptaparna Chakraborty | Assam | Runner-Up |
| 18 | Sayantani Das | Orissa | Eliminated |
| 19 | Shikha Jain | Gujarat | Eliminated |
| 20 | Shraddha Das | Jharkhand | Eliminated |
| 21 | Sonali Dogra | Jammu & Kashmir | Eliminated |
| 22 | Vinti Singh | Uttar Pradesh | Eliminated |
| 23 | Vipul Mehta | Punjab | Eliminated |
| 24 | Zakir Hussain | Chhattisgarh | Eliminated |

== Chote Ustad Season 2 ==
Amul Star Voice Of India Chote Ustad Season 2 is hosted by Chinmayi and Omi Vaidya. The judges are Rahat Fateh Ali Khan and Sonu Nigam. There are 20 contestants, 10 from Pakistan and 10 from India. The contestants are divided into ten groups with one contestant from India and one from Pakistan in a group. The following are the contestants:

Contestants from India

- Ansh Pandey (Eliminated)
- Rishabh Chaturvedi
- Sayantan Paul (Eliminated) (Wild Card Entrant)
- Mayuri Dey (Eliminated)
- Satinder Shanu (Eliminated)
- Akanksha Sharma
- Bhanu Pratap Agnihotri (Eliminated)
- Dipan Mitra (Eliminated)
- Debanjana Karmakar (Eliminated)
- Shyamantan Das (Eliminated)

Contestants from Pakistan

- Wania Jibran(Eliminated)
- Shahid Ali (Eliminated)
- Sayyed Mair Hasan (Eliminated)
- Rosemary Mushtaq (Eliminated)
- Fariha Akram (Eliminated)
- Rouhan Abbas
- Ahsan Ali (Eliminated) (Wild Card Entrant)
- MOHD. Fahad (Eliminated)
- Farrukh Moon
- Faisal (Eliminated)

The Pairings:

- Ansh Pandey and Wania Jibran(Eliminated)
- Satinder Shanu and Shahid Ali (Eliminated)
- Mayuri Dey and Sayyed Mair Hasan (Eliminated)
- Bhanu Pratap Aghnihotri and Ahsan Ali (Eliminated)
- Rishabh Chaturvedi and Farrukh Moon
- Debanjana Karmakar and Faisal (Eliminated)
- Dipan Mitra and Fariha Akram (Eliminated)
- Rosemary Mushtaq and Shyamantan Das (Eliminated)
- Sayantan Paul and Mohammad Fahad (Eliminated)
- Akanksha Sharma and Rouhan Abbas

Wild Card Pairing:

- Sayantan Paul and Ahsan Ali

Grand Finale

The Grand Finale was held on 10 October 2010. In third place was the Wild Card entry pair of Sayantan Paul and Ahsan Ali. In second place was the pair of Rishabh Chaturvedi and Farrukh Moon. The winner of Chote Ustaad 2010 was the pair of Akanksha Sharma and Rouhan Abbas. Shyamantan Das received a special Jury's Award because of his outstanding performance throughout the show.
