= Bhattanagar =

- Neighbourhood
- Location in West Bengal, India Bhattanagar (West Bengal) Bhattanagar (India)
- Coordinates: 22°37′25″N 88°19′14″E
- Country: India
- State: West Bengal
- Division: Presidency
- District: Howrah
- City: Howrah
- Metro Station: Howrah(under construction)

Government
  - Type: Municipal Corporation
  - Body: Howrah Municipal Corporation
- Elevation: 13 m (43 ft)

Languages
  - official: Bengali, English
- Time zone: UTC5:30 (IST)
- PIN: 711203
- Telephone code: +91/033
- Vehicle registration: WB
- HMC wards: 63, 64
- Lok Sabha constituency: Howrah
- Vidhan Sabha constituency: Bally, Domjoor

Bhattanagar is a neighbourhood in Howrah of Howrah district in the Indian state of West Bengal. It is a part of the area covered by Kolkata Metropolitan Development Authority (KMDA). Bhattanagar is under the jurisdiction of Liluah police station of Howrah City Police.

== Location ==
Bhattanagar is approximately 2.5 km from Liluah railway station, 7 km from Howrah Station and 8 km from Kolkata. The place is mostly rural and has no hospital.

== Education ==
One of the oldest schools of Howrah district, Bhattanagar Kulakamini Vidyamandir, is located there. Other educational institutions include the Don Bosco Self Employment Research Institute.

== Economy ==
Two banks are available there: Co-operative Bank and State Bank of India.

== Culture ==
Ramkrishna Sangha Club is a distinguished sports club established in 1977. The club organizes the annual Durga Puja since 1986. It also organizes cultural programs and events. Bhattanagar Netaji Sangha club organizes Kali Puja since the 1950s.

Beside Ramkrishna Sangha club there are other club like Arabindanagar Sahgha, Athletic club, Sporting club re also organized Durga Puja and many other cultural programs throughout the year. The main two attractions are the Ramkrishna Asram and Basanti Puja Mela.

Celebratory like Ms. Imon Chakraborty (national award winner singer), Ms. Esha Saha (Bengali movie actress), Mr. Srivats Goswami (cricketer) were leaved in Bhattanagar.

== Transport ==
=== Bus ===
- 39 Bhattanagar - Esplanade

=== Train ===
Bhattanagar railway station sits on its western side. The station is mainly used by freight trains. Passengers embark at Liluah railway station, approximately 2.5 km away.
