= Liluah railway station =

Railway Station in West Bengal, India

Liluah
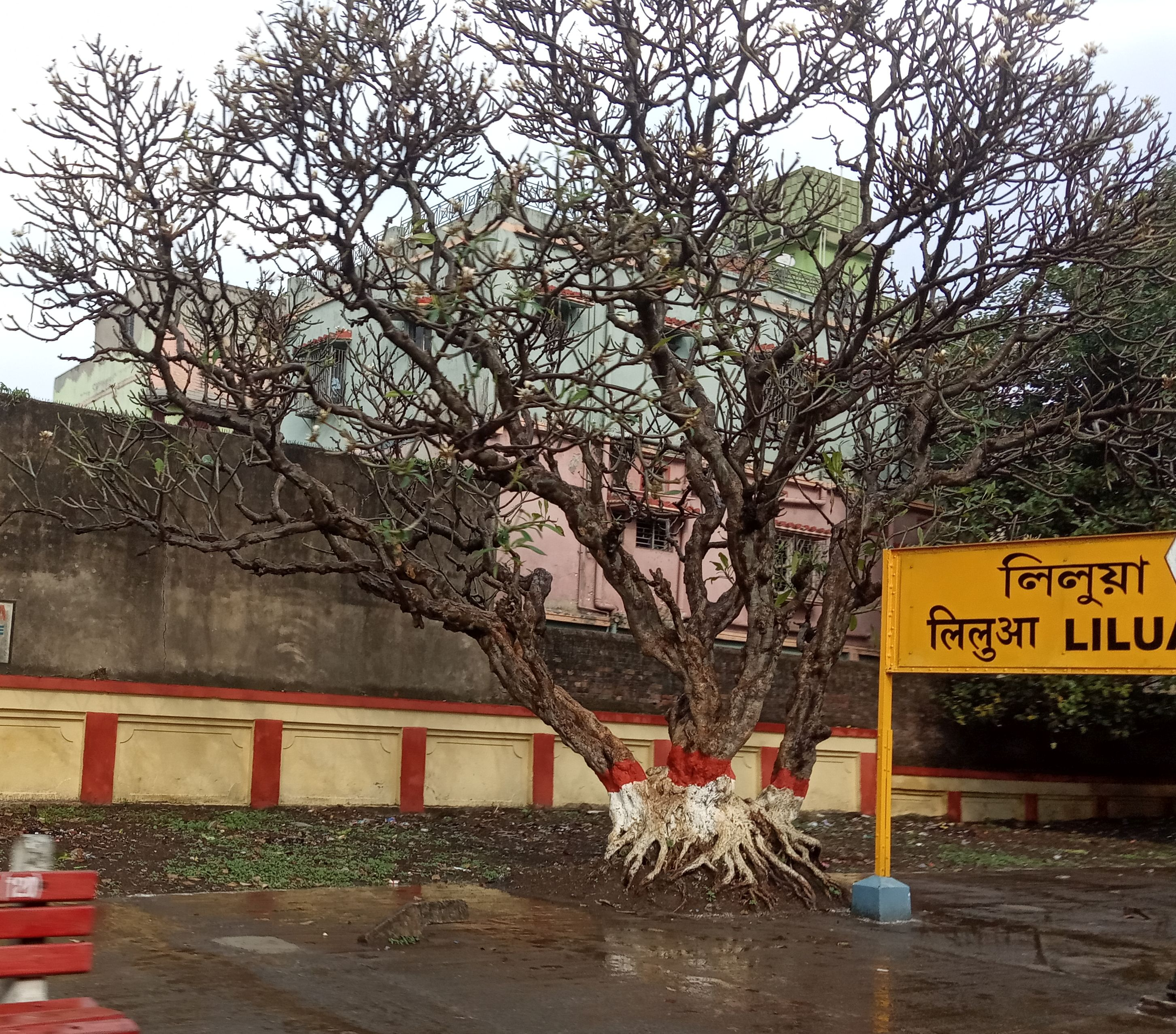
- Liluah railway station in 2020

General information
- Location: Belur Road, Liluah, Howrah, West Bengal; India
- Coordinates: 22°37′15″N 88°20′21″E
- Elevation: 10 metres (33 ft)
- System: Kolkata Suburban Railway station
- Owner: Indian Railways
- Operator: Eastern Railway
- Lines: Howrah–Bardhaman main line Howrah–Bardhaman chord
- Platforms: 5

Construction
- Structure type: Standard (on ground station)
- Parking: Limited
- Cycle facilities: Available

Other information
- Status: Functioning
- Station code: LLH
- Zone(s): Eastern Railway
- Division(s): Howrah

History
- Opened: 1854
- Electrified: 1958
- Former names: East Indian Railway

Services
Preceding station	Kolkata Suburban Railway	Following station
Howrah Junction Terminus	Eastern Line Main line, Chord line & Belur Math branch	Belur towards Bandel Junction
Howrah Junction Terminus	Eastern Line Main line, Chord line & Belur Math branch	Belur Math Terminus
Route map
Location
- Location within Kolkata Location within West Bengal Location within India

Liluah railway station is a Kolkata Suburban Railway station on the Howrah–Bardhaman main line and Howrah–Bardhaman chord. It is located in Howrah in the state of West Bengal. It serves the town of Liluah and the surrounding areas. It is 5 km from Howrah railway station.

== History ==
East Indian Railway Company started construction of a line out of Howrah for the proposed link with Delhi via Rajmahal and Mirzapur in 1851.

The first passenger train in eastern India ran from Howrah to Hooghly on 15 August 1854. The track was extended to Raniganj by 1855.

== Electrification ==
Electrification of Howrah–Burdwan main line was completed with 25 kV AC overhead system in 1958. The Howrah–Sheoraphuli–Tarakeswar line was electrified in 1957–58.

== Loco shed ==
There is a diesel loco shed at Liluah.

== Liluah Workshop and Colony ==
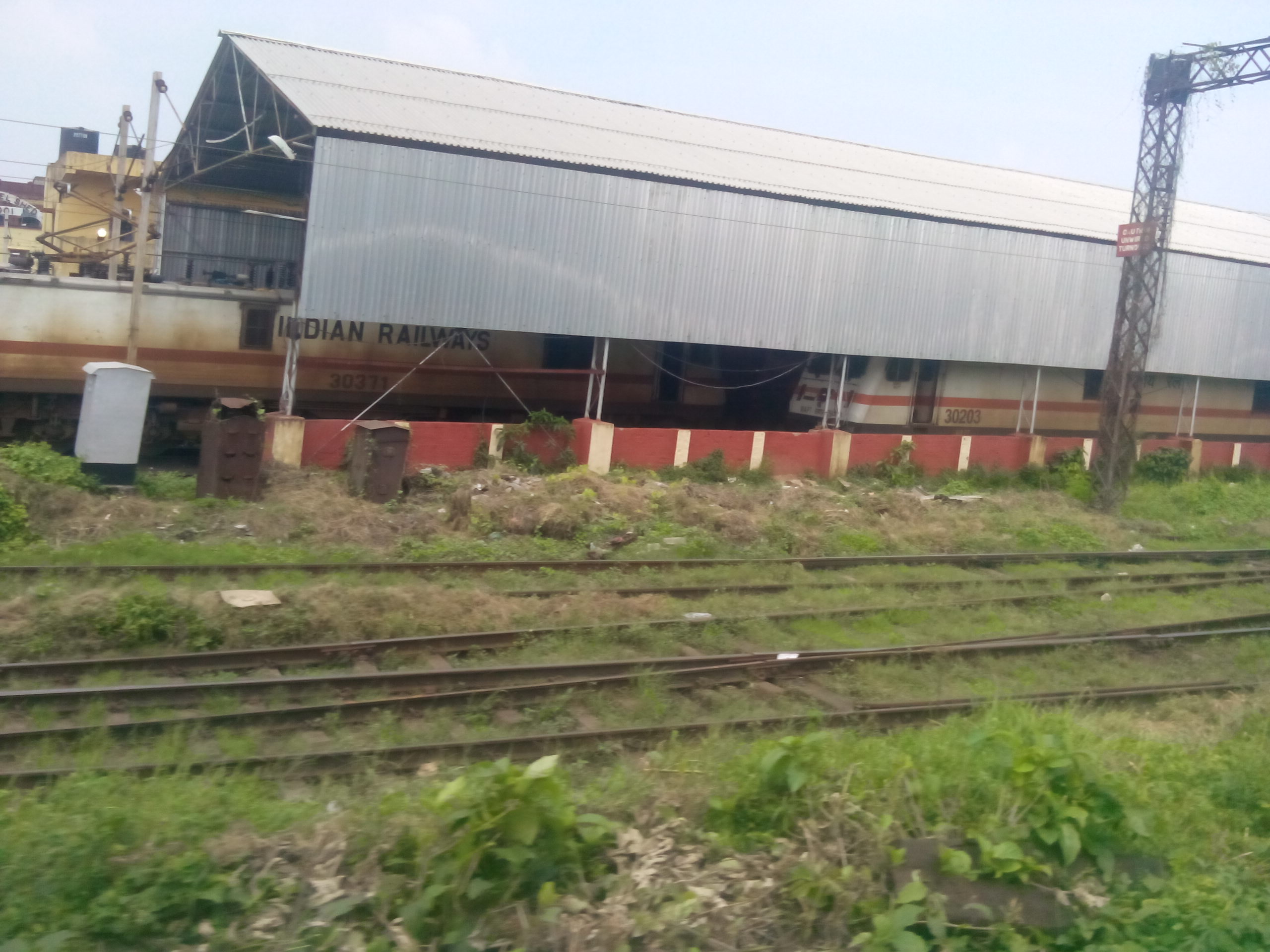
Liluah workshop and car shed in Liluah

The Railway Carriage and Wagon Workshop was established by East Indian Railway Company at Howrah and shifted to the present location at Liluah in 1900. The workshop is spread over an area of 299,000 sq m and has a staff strength of 9,990. The workshop is primarily engaged in overhauling of coaches. There is a captive township adjacent to the workshop. The roads of the "railway colony" were named after British engineers and continue to bear them.

== Accidents and incidents ==
On 14 December 2014 the 12381 UP Howrah–New Delhi Poorva Express derailed at 8.27 am after leaving Howrah at 8.15 am. Eleven sleeper coaches and a pantry car (AC Hot Buffet Car) of the New Delhi-bound Poorva Express derailed at Liluah shortly after leaving Howrah station. There was no casualty or injury to any passenger. The train was moving at a slow speed when it derailed. "The Poorva Express" was moving at 10 to 15 km/h when the accident occurred.
