= 1982 West Bengal Legislative Assembly election =

Assembly election in West Bengal

- 19 May 1982

All 294 seats in the West Bengal Legislative Assembly 148 seats needed for a majority
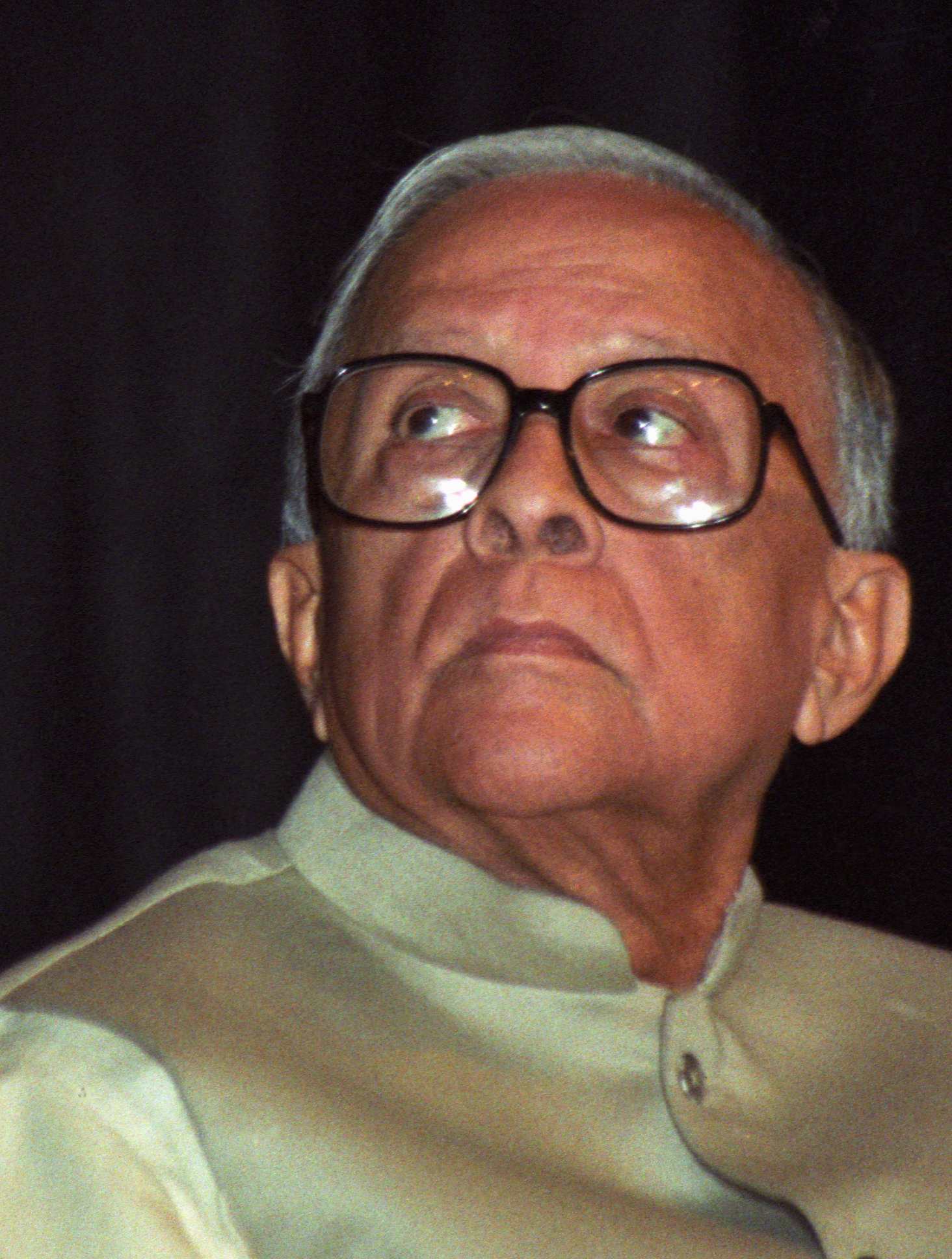

	Majority party	Minority party
Leader	Jyoti Basu	Ananda Gopal Mukherjee
Party	CPI(M)	INC(I)
Alliance	LF	INC(I)+IC(S)+IUML
Leader since	1964	1982
Leader's seat	Satgachhia	Did not contest (Note: Mukherjee was the sitting MP for Asansol.)
Last election	35.46%, 178 seats	New party
Seats won	174	49
Seat change	▼4	New
Popular vote	8,655,371	8,035,272
Percentage	38.49%	35.73%
Swing	▲3.03 pp	▲35.73 pp
Alliance seats	238	53
Seat change	▲7	New alliance
- Alliance wise Result
Chief Minister before election
Jyoti Basu
CPI(M)
Chief Minister after election
Jyoti Basu
CPI(M)

Legislative Assembly elections were held in the Indian state of West Bengal in 1982. The Left Front, which had won the 1977 West Bengal Legislative Assembly election, emerged victoriously. The Indian National Congress emerged as the main opposition party in the state, as the Janata Party was disintegrating.

== Background ==
On 6 January 1982, the West Bengal government requested that assembly elections be held on 15 March 1982, due to the approaching Monsoon season starting in April. However, in the end the election was held in May 1982, parallel to state assembly elections in Kerala, Himachal Pradesh and Haryana.

== Parties and Alliances ==
=== Left Front ===
Ahead of the 1982 assembly elections, the Left Front had gained three new members; the Communist Party of India (CPI), the West Bengal Socialist Party (WBSP) and the Democratic Socialist Party (DSP). Some of the older, smaller Left Front constituents were uncomfortable with the expansion of the alliance, claiming that CPI(M) was diluting it politically. There were also disagreements on distribution of ministerial portfolios after the expansion of the alliance. The Left Front campaign was heavily centred on the success of its land reform program & its empowerment of rural areas by conducting elections to the newly formed 3-tier panchayat system in 1978.

=== Congress (I)-Congress (S) alliance ===
As of the early 1980s, the Congress(I) was heavily divided in West Bengal. Divisions existed in each of the appointed ad hoc district committees across the state.

In 1978, Sharad Pawar named former West Bengal Congress leader Priya Ranjan Dasmunsi as president of the West Bengal Pradesh Congress Committee (Socialist). However Congress(I) and Congress(S) contested the 1982 in alliance. The IC(S) performed poorly in the 1982 assembly elections and a merger of the West Bengal units of the Congress(S) into the Congress(I) took place soon after the 1982 polls.

Congress(I) emerged as the largest opposition party in the election. Most of the seats previously held by the Janata Party were won by Congress(I) while also retaining the seats held by the Congress(R). With the Janata Party eradicated from the assembly, West Bengal politics became polarized between the Left Front and Congress(I) for many years until 1998.

=== Bharatiya Janata Party ===
The Bharatiya Janata Party contested the West Bengal assembly election for the first time in 1982. The primary objective of the party was to create a nucleus for a future third force in West Bengal politics. The party supported the call of the West Bengal government to hold the elections in March 1982.

== Seat Allotment ==
=== Left Front ===
Party	Flag	Symbol	Leader	Contesting Seats	
Communist Party of India (Marxist)			Jyoti Basu	209	219
Democratic Socialist Party			Prabodh Chandra Sinha	5	219
Revolutionary Communist Party of India			Baneswar Saikia	3	219
Marxist Forward Bloc			Pratim Chatterjee	2	219
All India Forward Bloc			Chitta Basu	34	
Revolutionary Socialist Party			Tridib Chaudhuri	23	
Communist Party of India			Chandra Rajeswara Rao	12	
West Bengal Socialist Party			Kiranmoy Nanda	5	
Total				294	

=== Congress Alliance ===
Party	Flag	Symbol	Leader	Contesting Seats
Indian National Congress (Indira)			Ananda Gopal Mukherjee	250
Indian Congress (Socialist)			Priya Ranjan Dasmunsi	28
Indian Union Muslim League			Ebrahim Sulaiman Sait	4
Independent				12
Total				294

=== Others ===
Party	Flag	Symbol	Leader	Contesting Seats
Janata Party			Chandra Shekhar	93
Bharatiya Janata Party			Lal Krishna Advani	52
Socialist Unity Centre of India (Communist)			Nihar Mukherjee	34
Lok Dal			Charan Singh	16
Jharkhand Mukti Morcha			Shibu Soren	1

== Gorkhaland agitation ==
In the wake of the 1980 Gorkhaland movement, a poll boycott campaign took place in the Darjeeling hills with the slogan "No State, No Vote". Organizations calling for a poll boycott included the Pranta Parishad and the Gorkha National Liberation Front of Subhash Ghisingh. Voter participation in Darjeeling stood at 59.40%, compared to the statewide 76.96%. CPI(M) emerged as the sole party of relevance in the hills to oppose a separate Gorkhaland state. CPI(M) won three out of the four assembly seats in the Nepali-dominated areas, the fourth going to an All India Gorkha League candidate (contesting as an independent).

== Results ==
The Left Front emerged victorious, winning 238 out of 294 seats in the election. The combined Left Front vote was 11,869,003 votes (52.7% of the votes cast in the state).

According to an unnamed Western diplomat, quoted in India Today in regards to the polls, "Bengali democracy has come really close to the East European variant of the 'people's democracy' where nobody expects an upsetting victory or defeat". Nevertheless, whilst the overall outcome was a landslide victory for the Left Front, the left also suffered a number of set-backs. Six incumbent Left Front ministers were defeated in their respective constituencies. The CPI(M) Information Minister Buddhadev Bhattacharya lost the Cossipur seat to Congress(I) candidate Prafulla Kanti Ghosh by 728 votes. The CPI(M) Education Minister Partha De, noted for his policy of removing English language from the primary school curriculum, lost the Bankura seat. The incumbent Food Minister, the Revolutionary Communist Party of India leader Sudhindranath Kumar, lost his seat Howrah Central. Finance Minister and CPI(M) heavy-weight Ashok Mitra lost the Rash Behari Avenue seat to Congress(I) candidate Haimi Bose . As Finance Minister Mitra had cracked down on the Sanchaita Savings Company, whose 'get-rich-quick' scheme had some 4,000 depositors in his constituency.

In Calcutta Congress(I) managed to win 11 out of 22 seats. Santosh Rana of the Provisional Central Committee, Communist Party of India (Marxist-Leninist) lost his Gopiballavpur seat to CPI(M).

The ninth West Bengal Legislative Assembly was constituted on 24 May 1982. CPI(M) leader Jyoti Basu remained as Chief Minister, being sworn in for a second term. Hasim Abdul Halim of CPI(M) became speaker of the Legislative Assembly, a post he would hold until 2011.

Party		Candidates	Seats	Votes	%
Left Front	Communist Party of India (Marxist)	209	174	8,655,371	38.49
Left Front	All India Forward Bloc	34	28	1,327,849	5.90
Left Front	Revolutionary Socialist Party	23	19	901,723	4.01
Left Front	Communist Party of India	12	7	407,660	1.81
Left Front	Revolutionary Communist Party of India	3	2	106,973	0.48
Left Front	Marxist Forward Bloc	2	2	80,307	0.36
Left Front	Biplobi Bangla Congress	1	0	34,185	0.15
Left Front	West Bengal Socialist Party and Democratic Socialist Party	10	6	354,935	1.58
Indian National Congress (I)		250	49	8,035,272	35.73
Indian Congress (Socialist)		28	4	885,535	3.94
Socialist Unity Centre of India		34	2	232,573	1.03
Janata Party		93	0	187,513	0.83
Bharatiya Janata Party		52	0	129,994	0.58
Indian Union Muslim League		4	0	129,116	0.57
Lok Dal		16	0	22,361	0.10
Jharkhand Mukti Morcha		1	0	1,268	0.01
Independents		432	1	994,701	4.42
Total		1,204	294	22,487,336	100
Source: ECI

== Elected members ==
Constituency	Reserved for (SC/ST/None)	Member	Party
Mekliganj	SC	Sada Kanta Roy	All India Forward Bloc
Sitalkuchi	SC	Sudhir Pramanik	Communist Party of India
Mathabhanga	SC	Dinesh Chandra Dakua	Communist Party of India
Cooch Behar North	None	Aparajita Goppi	All India Forward Bloc
Cooch Behar West	None	Bimal Kanti Basu	All India Forward Bloc
Sitai	None	Dipak Sen Gupta	All India Forward Bloc
Dinhata	None	Kamal Guha	All India Forward Bloc
Natabari	None	Sibendra Narayan Chowdhury	Communist Party of India
Tufanganj	SC	Manindra Nath Barma	Communist Party of India
Kumargram	ST	Subodh Uraon	Revolutionary Socialist Party
Kalchini	ST	Manohar Tirkey	Revolutionary Socialist Party
Alipurduars	None	Nani Bhattacharya	Revolutionary Socialist Party
Falakat	SC	Jogendra Nath Singh Roy	Communist Party of India
Madarihat	ST	Sushil Kujur	Revolutionary Socialist Party
Dhupguri	SC	Banamali Roy	Communist Party of India
Nagrakata	ST	Punai Uraon	Communist Party of India
Maynaguri	SC	Tarak Bandhu Roy	Revolutionary Socialist Party
Mal	ST	Mohanlal Oraon	Communist Party of India
Kranti	None	Parimal Mitra	Communist Party of India
Jalpaiguri	None	Nirmal Bose	All India Forward Bloc
Raiganj	SC	Dhirendra Nath Ray	Communist Party of India
Kalimpong	None	Renu Leena Subba	Independent
Darjeeling	None	Dawa Lama	Communist Party of India
Kurseong	None	H. B. Rai	Communist Party of India
Siliguri	None	Biren Bose	Communist Party of India
Phansidewa	ST	Patras Minz	Communist Party of India
Chopra	None	Mahammad Bacha Munshi	Communist Party of India
Islampur	None	Choudhary Md. Abdulkarim	Indian National Congress
Goalpokhar	None	Mohammad Ramjan Ali	All India Forward Bloc
Karandighi	None	Suresh Singha	All India Forward Bloc
Raiganj	SC	Dipendra Barman	Indian National Congress
Kaliaganj	SC	Naba Kumar Roy	Indian National Congress
Kushmandi	SC	Dhirendra Nath Sarkar	Indian National Congress
Itahar	None	Abedin Zainal	Indian Congress
Gangarampur	None	Moslehuddin Ahmed	Indian Congress
Tapan	ST	Khara Soren	Revolutionary Socialist Party
Kumarganj	None	Dwijendra Nath Ray	Communist Party of India
Balurghat	None	Biswanath Choudhury	Revolutionary Socialist Party
Habibpur	ST	Sarkar Murmu	Communist Party of India
Gajol	ST	Sufal Murmu	Communist Party of India
Kharba	None	Mahbubul Hoque	Indian National Congress
Harishchandrapur	None	Abdul Wahed	Indian National Congress
Ratua	None	Samar Mukherjee	Indian National Congress
Araidanga	None	Habib Mustafa	Communist Party of India
Malda	SC	Phani Bhusan Roy	Indian National Congress
Englishbazar	None	Sailen Sarkar	Communist Party of India
Manikchak	None	Jokhilal Mandal	Indian National Congress
Sujapur	None	Humayoun Chowdhury	Indian National Congress
Kaliachak	None	Promode Ranjan Bose	Communist Party of India
Farakka	None	Abul Hasnat Khan	Communist Party of India
Aurangabad	None	Lutfal Haque	Indian National Congress
Suti	None	Shish Mohammad	Revolutionary Socialist Party
Sagardighi	SC	Biswas Hazari	Communist Party of India
Jangipur	None	Habibur Rahaman	Indian National Congress
Lalgola	None	Abdus Sattar	Indian National Congress
Bhagabangola	None	Kazi Hafizur Rahman	Indian National Congress
Nabagram	None	Birendra Narayan Ray	Communist Party of India
Murshidabad	None	Chhaya Ghosh	All India Forward Bloc
Jalangi	None	Atahar Rahaman	Communist Party of India
Domkal	None	Md. Abdul Bari	Communist Party of India
Naoda	None	Jayanta Kumar Biswas	Revolutionary Socialist Party
Hariharpara	None	Sk. Imajuddin	Indian National Congress
Berhampore	None	Debabrata Bandapadhyay	Revolutionary Socialist Party
Beldanga	None	Nurual Islam Choudhury	Indian National Congress
Kandi	None	Atish Chandra Sinha	Indian National Congress
Khargram	SC	Dinabandhu Majhi	Communist Party of India
Barwan	None	Amalendra Roy	Revolutionary Socialist Party
Bharatpur	None	Satyapada Bhattacharya	Revolutionary Socialist Party
Karimpur	None	Chittaranjan Biswas	Communist Party of India
Palashipara	None	Madhabendu Mahanta	Communist Party of India
Nakashipara	None	Mir Fakir Mohammad	Communist Party of India
Kaliganj	None	Debsaran Ghosh	Revolutionary Socialist Party
Chapra	None	Sahabuddin Mondal	Communist Party of India
Krishnaganj	SC	Jnanendra Nath Biswas	Communist Party of India
Krishnagar East	None	Sadhan Chattopadhy Y	Communist Party of India
Krishnagar West	None	Amritendu Mukhopadhyay	Communist Party of India
Nabadwip	None	Debi Prasad Basu	Communist Party of India
Santipur	None	Bimalananda Mukherjee	Independent
Hanskhali	SC	Sukumar Mandal	Communist Party of India
Ranaghat Uttar Purba	SC	Satish Biswas	Communist Party of India
Ranaghat Uttar Paschim	None	Gourchandra Kundu	Communist Party of India
Chakdaha	None	Subhas Basu	Communist Party of India
Haringhata	None	Nanigopal Malakar	Communist Party of IndiaChakdaha
Bagdah	SC	Kamalakshmi Biswas	All India Forward Bloc
Bongaon	None	Bhupendra Nath Seth	Indian National Congress
Gaighata	None	Kanti Biswas	Communist Party of India
Habra	None	Nirode Roy Choudhury	Communist Party of India
Ashokenagar	None	Nani Kar	Communist Party of India
Amdanga	None	Hashim Abdul Halim	Communist Party of India
Barasat	None	Saral Deb	All India Forward Bloc
Rajarhat	SC	Rabindra Nath Mandal	Communist Party of India
Deganga	None	Martaza Hossain	All India Forward Bloc
Swarupnagar	None	Anisur Rahaman Biswas	Communist Party of India
Baduria	None	Quazi Abdul Gaffar	Indian National Congress
Basirhat	None	Narayandas Mukherjee	Communist Party of India
Hasnabad	None	Amiya Bhusan Banerjee	Communist Party of India
Haroa	SC	Kshiti Ranjan Mondal	Communist Party of India
Sandeshkhali	SC	Kumud Ranjan Biswas	Communist Party of India
Hingalganj	SC	Sudhangshu Sekhar Mondal	Communist Party of India
Gosaba	SC	Ganesh Mondal	Revolutionary Socialist Party
Basanti	SC	Subhas Naskar	Revolutionary Socialist Party
Kultali	SC	Prabodh Purkait	Socialist Unity Centre of India
Joynagar	None	Deva Prasad Sarkar	Socialist Unity Centre of India
Baruipur	None	Hemen Mojumdar	Communist Party of India
Canning West	SC	Chitta Ranjan Mridha	Communist Party of India
Canning East	None	Abdur Razzak Molla	Communist Party of India
Bhangar	None	Daud Khan	Communist Party of India
Jadavpur	None	Sankar Gupta	Communist Party of India
Sonarpur	SC	Gangadhar Naskar	Communist Party of India
Bishnupur East	SC	Sundar Naskar	Communist Party of India
Bishnupur West	None	Provash Chandra Roy	Communist Party of India
Behala East	None	Niranjan Mukherjee	Communist Party of India
Behala West	None	Rabin Mukherjee	Communist Party of India
Garden Reach	None	Shamsuzzoha	Indian National Congress
Maheshtala	None	Mir Abdus Sayeed	Communist Party of India
Budge Budge	None	Kshitibhusan Roybarman	Communist Party of India
Satgachia	None	Jyoti Basu	Communist Party of India
Falta	None	Nimai Das	Communist Party of India
Diamond Harbour	None	Abdul Quiyam Molla	Communist Party of India
Magrahat West	None	Abdus Sobahan Gazi	Communist Party of India
Magrahat East	SC	Radhika Ranjan Pramanik	Communist Party of India
Mandirbazar	SC	Subhash Chandra Ray	Communist Party of India
Mathurapur	None	Satya Ranjan Bapuli	Indian National Congress
Kulpi	SC	Krishandhan Halder	Communist Party of India
Patharpratima	None	Gunadhar Maity	Communist Party of India
Kakdwip	None	Hrishikesh Maity	Communist Party of India
Sagar	None	Prabhanjan Kumar Mandal	Communist Party of India
Bijpur	None	Jagadish Chandra Das	Communist Party of India
Naihati	None	Ajit Basu	Communist Party of India
Bhatpara	None	Sitaram Gupta	Communist Party of India
Jagatdal	None	Nihar Basu	All India Forward Bloc
Noapara	None	Jamini Saha	Communist Party of India
Titagarh	None	Ganga Prasad Sha	Indian National Congress
Khardah	None	Kamal Sarkar	Communist Party of India
Panihati	None	Gopal Krishna Bhattacharyya	Communist Party of India
Kamarhati	None	Radhika Ranjan Baneji	Communist Party of India
Baranagar	None	Matish Roy	Revolutionary Socialist Party
Dum Dum	None	Santi Ranjan Ghatak	Communist Party of India
Belgachia East	None	Subhas Chakraborty	Communist Party of India
Cossipur	None	Prafullya Kanti Ghosh	Indian National Congress
Shyampukur	None	Kiran Chaudhuri	Indian National Congress
Jorabagan	None	Subrata Mukherjee	Indian National Congress
Jorasanko	None	Deokinnandan Poddar	Indian National Congress
Bara Bazar	None	Rajesh Khaitan	Indian National Congress
Bowbazar	None	Abdul Rauf Ansari	Indian National Congress
Chowranghee	None	Sisir Kumar Bose	Indian National Congress
Kabitirtha	None	Kalimuddin Shams	All India Forward Bloc
Alipore	None	Anup Kumar Chandra	Indian National Congress
Rashbehari Avenue	None	Hoimi Basu	Indian National Congress
Tollygunge	None	Prasanta Kumar Sur	Communist Party of India
Dhakuria	None	Jatin Chakraborty	Revolutionary Socialist Party
Ballygunge	None	Sachin Sen	Communist Party of India
Entally	None	Md. Nizamuddin	Communist Party of India
Taltola	SC	Sumanta Kumar Hira	Communist Party of India
Beliaghata	None	Krishna Pada Ghosh	Communist Party of India
Sealdah	None	Somendra Nath Mitra	Indian National Congress
Vidyasagar	None	Lakshmi Kant Dey	Communist Party of India
Burtola	None	Ajit Kumar Panja	Indian National Congress
Manicktola	None	Shyamal Chakrabarty	Communist Party of India
Belgachia West	None	Rathindra Nath Roy	Communist Party of India
Bally	None	Patit Paban Pathak	Communist Party of India
Howrah North	None	Ashoke Ghosh	Indian National Congress
Howrah Central	None	Ambica Banerjee	Indian National Congress
Howrah South	None	Pralay Talukdar	Communist Party of India
Shibpur	None	Kanailal Bhattacharya	All India Forward Bloc
Domjur	None	Joykesh Mukherjee	Communist Party of India
Jagatballavpur	None	M.ansaruddin	Communist Party of India
Panchla	None	Anwar Ali Sk.	Indian National Congress
Sankrail	SC	Haran Hazra	Communist Party of India
Uluberia North	SC	Raj Kumar Mondal	Communist Party of India
Uluberia South	None	Rabindra Ghosh	All India Forward Bloc
Shyampur	None	Gourhari Adak	All India Forward Bloc
Bagnan	None	Nerupama Chatterjee	Communist Party of India
Kalyanpur	None	Nitai Charan Adak	Communist Party of India
Amta	None	Barindra Nath Koley	Communist Party of India
Udaynarayanpur	None	Pannalal Maji	Communist Party of India
Jangipara	None	Manindra Nath Jana	Communist Party of India
Chandital	None	Malin Ghose	Communist Party of India
Uttarpara	None	Santasri Chattapadhyay	Communist Party of India
Serampore	None	Arun Kumar Goswami	Indian National Congress
Champdani	None	Sailendra Nath Chattopadhyay	Communist Party of India
Chandernagore	None	Bhabani Mukherjee	Communist Party of India
Singur	None	Tarapada Sadhykhan	Indian National Congress
Haripal	None	Balai Bandyopadhya	Communist Party of India
Tarakeswar	None	Ram Chatterjee	Independent
Chinsurah	None	Ghosh Sambhu Charan	All India Forward Bloc
Bansberia	None	Prabir Sengupta	Communist Party of India
Balagarh	SC	Abinash Pramanik	Communist Party of India
Pandua	None	Chakraborty Deb Narayan	Communist Party of India
Polba	None	Brajo Gopal Neogy	Communist Party of India
Dhaniakhali	SC	Kripa Sindhu Saha	All India Forward Bloc
Pursurah	None	Santi Mohun Roy	Indian National Congress
Khanakul	SC	Sachindra Nath Hajra	Communist Party of India
Arambagh	None	Abdul Mannan	Indian National Congress
Goghat	SC	Shiba Parsad Malick	All India Forward Bloc
Chandrakona	None	Umpati Chakraborty	Communist Party of India
Ghatal	SC	Gopal Mandal	Communist Party of India
Daspur	None	Prabhas Poodikar	Communist Party of India
Nandanpur	None	Chhaya Bera	Communist Party of India
Panskura West	None	Sk. Omar Ali	Communist Party of India
Panskura East	None	Swadesranjan Maji	Independent
Tamluk	None	Biswanath Mukherjee	Communist Party of India
Moyna	None	Pulak Bera	Communist Party of India
Mahishadal	None	Dinabandu Mondal	Communist Party of India
Sutahata	SC	Lakshman Chandra Seth	Communist Party of India
Nandigram	None	Bhupal Panda	Communist Party of India
Narghat	None	Bankim Behari Maity	Independent
Bhagabanpur	None	Prasanta Kumar Pradhran	Communist Party of India
Khejuri	SC	Sunirmal Paik	Independent
Contai North	None	Maity Mukul Bikash	Indian National Congress
Contai South	None	Adhikary Sisir	Indian National Congress
Ramnagar	None	Abanti Mishra	Indian National Congress
Egra	None	Sinha Prabodh Chandra	Independent
Mugberia	None	Kiranmoy Nanda	Independent
Pataspur	None	Kamakhya Nandan Das Mahapatra	Communist Party of India
Sabang	None	Manas Bhunia	Indian National Congress
Pingla	None	Haripada Jana	Independent
Debra	None	Syed Moazzam Hossain	Communist Party of India
Keshpur	SC	Kumar Himansu	Communist Party of India
Garbeta East	None	Suvendu Mandal	Communist Party of India
Garbeta West	SC	Anadi Malla	Communist Party of India
Salboni	None	Sundar Hazra	Communist Party of India
Midnapore	None	Kamakhya Ghosh	Communist Party of India
Kharagpur Town	None	Gyan Singh Sohanpal	Indian Congress
Kharagpur Rural	None	Sheikh Siraj Ali	Communist Party of India
Keshiary	ST	Maheswar Murmu	Communist Party of India
Narayangarh	None	Bibhuti Bhusan De	Communist Party of India
Dantan	None	Kanai Bhowmik	Communist Party of India
Nayagram	ST	Ananta Saren	Communist Party of India
Gopiballavpur	None	De Sunil	Communist Party of India
Jhargram	None	Abani Bhusan Satpati	Communist Party of India
Binpur	ST	Sambhu Nath Mandi	Communist Party of India
Banduan	ST	Sudhangshu Sarkar Majhi	Communist Party of India
Manbazar	None	Kamala Kanta Mahato	Communist Party of India
Balrampur	ST	Bikram Tudu	Communist Party of India
Arsa	None	Dhrubeswar Chttopadhaya	All India Forward Bloc
Jhalda	None	Subhas Chandra Mahato	Indian National Congress
Jaipur	None	Santi Ram Mahato	Indian National Congress
Purulia	None	Sukumar Roy	Indian Congress
Para	SC	Gobinda Bouri	Communist Party of India
Raghunathpur	SC	Natabar Bagdi	Communist Party of India
Kashipur	ST	Surendra Nath Majhi	Communist Party of India
Hura	None	Ambarish Mukherjee	Communist Party of India
Taldangra	None	Mohini Mohan Panda	Communist Party of India
Raipur	ST	Upen Kisku	Communist Party of India
Ranibandh	ST	Rampada Mandi	Communist Party of India
Indpur	SC	Bauri Madan	Communist Party of India
Chhatna	None	Goswani Subhas	Revolutionary Socialist Party
Gangajalghati	SC	Bouri Nabani	Communist Party of India
Barjora	None	Bhattcharya Lal Behari	Communist Party of India
Bankura	None	Kashinath Mishra	Indian National Congress
Onda	None	Anil Mukhopadhyay	All India Forward Bloc
Vishnupur	None	Achintya Krishna Ray	Communist Party of India
Kotulpur	None	Gunadhar Choudhury	Communist Party of India
Indas	SC	Badan Bora	Communist Party of India
Sonamukhi	SC	Sukhendu Khan	Communist Party of India
Kulti	None	Madhu Benerjee	All India Forward Bloc
Barabani	None	Ajt Chakrabarty	Communist Party of India
Hirapur	None	Bamapada Mukherjee	Communist Party of India
Asansol	None	Bejoy Pal	Communist Party of India
Raniganj	None	Haradhan Roy	Communist Party of India
Jamuria	None	Bikash Chowdhury	Communist Party of India
Ukhra	SC	Lakhan Bagdi	Communist Party of India
Durgapur-i	None	Dilip Mazumdar	Communist Party of India
Durgapur-ii	None	Tarun Chatterjee	Communist Party of India
Kanksa	SC	Lakshi Narayan Saha	Communist Party of India
Ausgram	SC	Sreedhar Malik	Communist Party of India
Bhatar	None	Sayed Md. Masih	Communist Party of India
Galsi	None	Sen Deb Ranjan	All India Forward Bloc
Burdwan North	None	Goswami Ramnarayan	Communist Party of India
Burdwan South	None	Chowdhury Benoy Krishna	Communist Party of India
Khandaghosh	SC	Purna Chandra Malik	Communist Party of India
Raina	None	Dhirendra Nath Chatterjee	Communist Party of India
Jamalpur	SC	Sunil Santra	Independent
Memari	None	Moharani Konar	Communist Party of India
Kalna	None	Anju Kar	Communist Party of India
Nandanghat	None	S.a.m. Habibullah	Communist Party of India
Manteswar	None	Hemanta Roy	Communist Party of India
Purbasthali	None	Monoranjan Nath	Communist Party of India
Katwa	None	Haramohan Sinha	Communist Party of India
Mangalkot	None	Nikhilananda Sar	Communist Party of India
Ketugram	SC	Raicharan Majhi	Communist Party of India
Nannor	SC	Banamali Das	Communist Party of India
Bolpur	None	Jyotsna Kumar Gupta	Revolutionary Socialist Party
Labhpur	None	Sunil Majumder	Communist Party of India
Dubrajpur	None	Bhakti Bhusan Mandal	All India Forward Bloc
Rajnagar	SC	Siddheswar Mandal	All India Forward Bloc
Suri	None	Chattaraj Suniti	Indian National Congress
Mahammad Bazar	None	Dhiren Sen	Communist Party of India
Mayureswar	SC	Dhirendra Let	Communist Party of India
Rampurhat	None	Sasanka Sekhar Mondal	All India Forward Bloc
Hansan	SC	Trilochan Mal	Independent
Nalhati	None	Sattik Kumar Roy	All India Forward Bloc
Murarai	None	Motahar Hossain	Indian National Congress
