= 2001 West Bengal Legislative Assembly election =

- 10 May 2001

All 294 seats in the West Bengal Legislative Assembly 148 seats needed for a majority
- Turnout: 75.29% (▼6.68 pp)
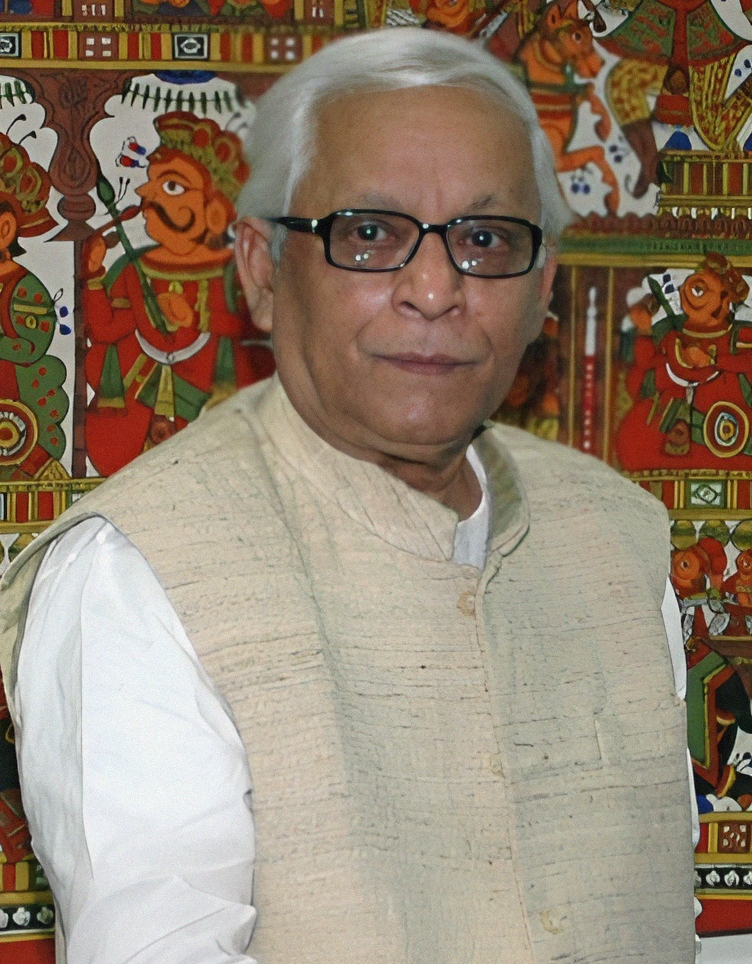

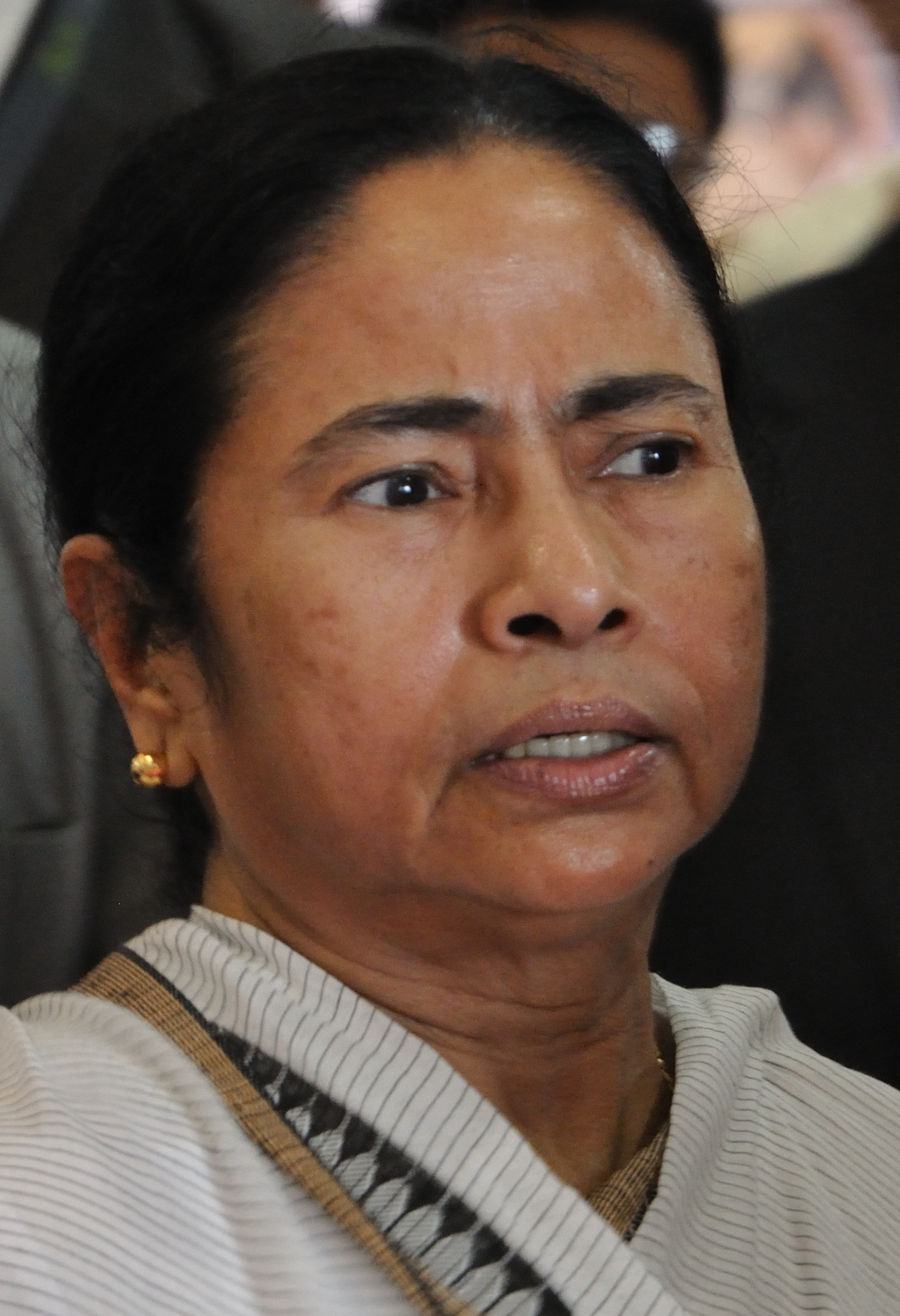

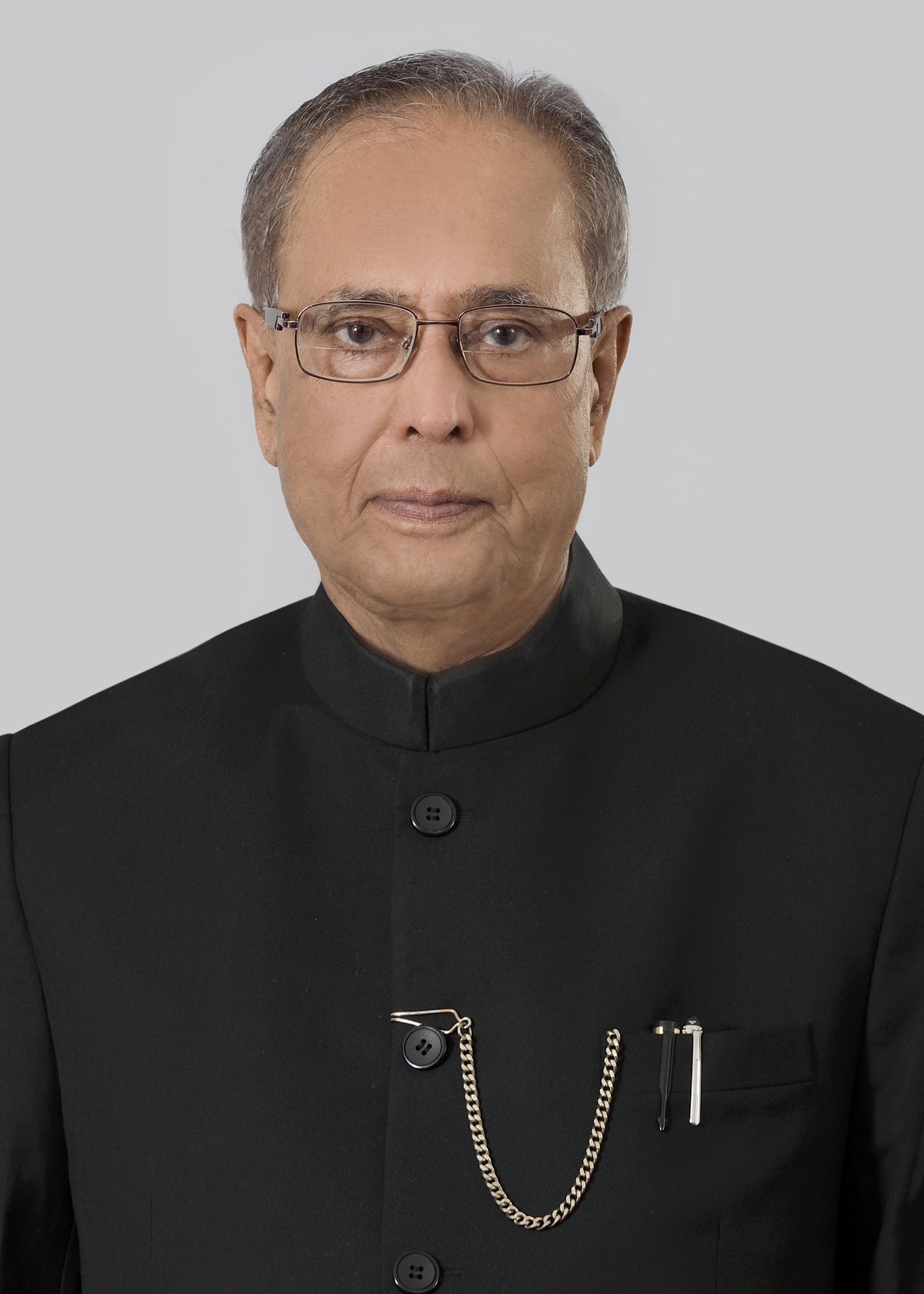
	First party	Second party	Third party
Leader	Buddhadeb Bhattacharjee	Mamata Banerjee	Pranab Mukherjee
Party	CPI(M)	AITC	INC
Alliance	LF	INC+TMC	INC+TMC
Leader since	2000	1998	1998
Leader's seat	Jadavpur	Did not contest (Note: Banerjee was the sitting MP for South Kolkata)	Did not contest
Last election	37.16%, 153 seats	New Party	39.48%, 82 seats
Seats won	143	60	26
Seat change	▼10	New	▼56
Popular vote	13,402,603	11,229,396	2,921,151
Percentage	36.59%	30.66%	7.98%
Swing	▼1.33 pp	New	▼31.5 pp
Alliance seats	196	89	89
Seat change	▼7	▲4	▲4
- Seatwise Result Map of the election

- Structure of the West Bengal Legislative Assembly after the election
Chief Minister before election
Buddhadeb Bhattacharjee
CPI(M)
Chief Minister after election
Buddhadeb Bhattacharjee
CPI(M)

Legislative Assembly elections were held in Indian state of West Bengal in 2001 to elect 294 members of the West Bengal Legislative Assembly.

== Schedule ==
Event	Date
Date for Nominations	16 April 2001
Last Date for filing Nominations	23 April 2001
Date for scrutiny of nominations	24 April 2001
Last date for withdrawal of candidatures	26 April 2001
Date of poll	10 May 2001
Date of counting	13 May 2001

== Seat Allotment ==
=== Left Front ===
Party	Flag	Symbol	Leader	Contesting Seats	
Communist Party of India (Marxist)			Buddhadeb Bhattacharya	210	216
Democratic Socialist Party			Prabodh Chandra Sinha	2	216
Revolutionary Communist Party of India (Rasik Bhatt)			Rasik Bhatt	2	216
Marxist Forward Bloc			Pratim Chatterjee	1	216
Biplobi Bangla Congress				1	216
All India Forward Bloc			Debabrata Biswas	34	
Revolutionary Socialist Party			Kshiti Goswami	23	
Communist Party of India			A. B. Bardhan	13	
West Bengal Socialist Party			Kiranmoy Nanda	4	
Janata Dal (Secular) (Note: This Symbol was used by JD(S) until 2001)			H. D. Deve Gowda	2	
Rashtriya Janata Dal			Lalu Prasad Yadav	2	
Total				294	

=== AITC + INC ===
Party	Flag	Symbol	Leader	Contesting Seats
All India Trinamool Congress			Mamata Banerjee	226
Indian National Congress			Pranab Mukherjee	60
Jharkhand Mukti Morcha			Shibu Soren	5
Gorkha National Liberation Front				5
Total				294+2 (Note: Friendly Contest on Siliguri and Phansidewa between GNLF and TMC, INC.)

=== National Democratic Alliance ===
Party	Flag	Symbol	Leader	Contesting Seats
Bharatiya Janata Party			Tapan Sikdar	266
Janata Dal (United)			Nitish Kumar	14
Samata Party			George Fernandes	7
Lok Janshakti Party			Ram Vilas Paswan	4
Total				279+12 (Note: Friendly Contest on 12 constituencies between BJP, SAP and JD(U).)

== List of Candidates ==
Constituency		Left Front		AITC+	
#	Name	Party	Candidate	Party	Candidate
1	Mekliganj (SC)	AIFB	Paresh Chandra Adhikary	AITC	Ramesh Roy
2	Sitalkuchi (SC)	CPM	Sudhir Pramanik	INC	Birendra Narayan Barma
3	Mathabhanga (SC)	CPM	Dinesh Chandra Dakua	AITC	Binoy Krishna Barman
4	Cooch Behar North	AIFB	Dipak Chandra Sarker	AITC	Mihir Goswami
5	Cooch Behar West	AIFB	Akshoy Thakur	AITC	Soumendra Chandra Das
6	Sitai	AIFB	Nripendra Nath Roy	INC	Dr. Md Fazle Haque
7	Dinhata	AIFB	Kamal Guha	AITC	Dipak Sengupta
8	Natabari	CPM	Tamser Ali	AITC	Rabindranath Ghosh
9	Tufanganj (SC)	CPM	Pushpa Chandra Das	AITC	Sachindra Chandra Das
10	Kumargram (ST)	RSP	Dasrath Tirkey	AITC	Paresh Chandra Das
11	Kalchini (ST)	RSP	Mahonar Tirkey	INC	Paban Kumar Lakra
12	Alipurduars	RSP	Nirmal Das	AITC	Prasanta Narayan Majumder
13	Falakata (SC)	CPM	Jogesh Chandra Barman	AITC	Anil Adhikary
14	Madarihat (ST)	RSP	Kumari Kujur	AITC	Narendra Nath Karjee
15	Dhupguri (SC)	CPM	Lakshmi Kanta Roy	AITC	Ashoke Kumar Barman
16	Nagrakata (ST)	CPM	Chaitan Munda	AITC	Ganesh Oraon
17	Mainaguri (SC)	RSP	Bachchamohan Roy	AITC	Purnaprabha Barman
18	Mal (ST)	CPM	Somra Lakra	INC	Shyam Bhagat
19	Kranti	CPM	Sudhan Raha	AITC	Aburabbani Ahmed (Badsha)
20	Jalpaiguri	AIFB	Gobinda Roy	AITC	Anupam Sen
21	Rajganj (SC)	CPM	Jotindra Nath Roy	AITC	Khageswar Roy
22	Kalimpong	CPI	Mohan Singh Rai (Dukhun)	GNLF	Goulan Lepcha
23	Darjeeling	CPM	K. B. Watter	INC	Parvati Pradhan
24	Kurseong	CPM	Tulsi Bhattrai	GNLF	Shanta Chettri
25	Siliguri	CPM	Asok Bhattacharya	AITC	Prasanta Nandy
26	Phansidewa (ST)	CPM	Prakash Minj	INC	Mamla Kujur
27	Chopra	CPM	Akbar Ali	AITC	Chowdhury Manzar Afaque
28	Islampur	CPM	Md. Faruque Azam	AITC	Abdul Karim Chowdhary
29	Goalpokhar	AIFB	Hafiz Alam Sairani	INC	Deepa Dasmunshi
30	Karandighi	AIFB	Gokul Roy	INC	Haji Sajjad Hussain
31	Raiganj (SC)	CPM	Harinarayan Roy	INC	Chittaranjan Roy
32	Kaliaganj (SC)	CPM	Ramani Kanta Deb Sarma	INC	Pramathanath Roy
33	Kushmandi (SC)	RSP	Narmada Chandra Roy	AITC	Jitendra Nath Sarkar
34	Itahar	CPI	Srikumar Mukherjee	INC	Amal Acharjee
35	Gangarampur	CPM	Narayan Biswas	AITC	Biplab Mitra
36	Tapan (ST)	RSP	Khara Soren	AITC	Antony Uraw
37	Kumarganj	CPM	Khatun Mafuja	AITC	Nani Gopal Roy
38	Balurghat	RSP	Choudhury Biswanath	AITC	Shankar Chakravorti
39	Habibpur (ST)	CPM	Jadu Hemrom	INC	Jay Murmu (Soren)
40	Gajol (ST)	CPM	Sadhu Tudu	AITC	Nabakumar Hembrom
41	Kharba	CPM	Nazmul Hoque	INC	Mahabubul Haque
42	Harishchandrapur	AIFB	Birendra Kumar Maitra	INC	Alam Mostaque
43	Ratua	CPM	Sailen Sarkar	INC	Samar Mukherjee
44	Araindanga	CPM	Setara Begum	INC	Sabitri Mitra
45	Malda (SC)	CPM	Subhendu Chowdhury	AITC	Phanibhusan Roy
46	English Bazar	CPM	Samar Roy	AITC	Krishnendu Narayan Choudhury
47	Manikchak	CPM	Asima Chowdhuri	INC	Ram Probesh Mandal
48	Sujapur	CPM	Abdur Rauf	INC	Rubi Noor
49	Kaliachak	CPM	Biswanath Ghosh	INC	Abu Hasem Khan Chowdhury
50	Farakka	CPM	Mir Tarekul Islam	INC	Mainul Haque
51	Aurangabad	CPM	Nur Mohammad	INC	Humayun Reza
52	Suti	RSP	Jane Alam Mian	AITC	Shish Mohammad
53	Sagardighi (SC)	CPM	Das Paresh Nath	AITC	Rajesh Kumar Bhakat
54	Jangipur	RSP	Abul Hasnat	AITC	Sekh Md. Furkan
55	Lalgola	CPM	Md. Johaque Ali	INC	Abu Hena
56	Bhagabangola	WBSP	Mojibor Rahaman	INC	Abu Sufian Sarkar
57	Nabagram	CPM	Nripen Chaudhuri	INC	Arit Majumder
58	Murshidabad	AIFB	Chhaya Ghosh	AITC	Sagir Hossain
59	Jalangi	CPM	Unus Ali Sarkar	INC	Subrata Saha
60	Domkal	CPM	Anisur Rahaman Sarkar	INC	Rejaul Karim (Manik)
61	Naoda	RSP	Jayanta Kumar Biswas	AITC	Alhaz Nasiruddin Khan
62	Hariharpara	CPM	Nizamuddin	AITC	Mohfuz Alam
63	Berhampore	RSP	Kartick Sahana	INC	Maya Rani Paul
64	Beldanga	RSP	Timir Baran Bhaduri	INC	Golam Kibria Mia
65	Kandi	CPI	Chandan Sen	INC	Atish Chandra Sinha
66	Khargram (SC)	CPM	Biswanath Mondal	INC	Madhab Chandra Marjit
67	Barwan	RSP	Amalendralal Roy	INC	Tapas Dasgupta
68	Bharatpur	RSP	Id. Mohammad	AITC	Kanchanlal Mukherjee
69		CPM	Prafulla Kumar Bhowmick	AITC	Chira Ranjan Mondal
70	Palashipara	CPM	Kamalendu Sanyal	AITC	Tapas Kumar Saha
71	Nakashipara	CPM	Sekh Khabir Uddin Ahamed	AITC	Kallol Khan
72	Kaliganj	RSP	Dhananjoy Modak	AITC	Abdus Salam Munshi
73	Chapra	CPM	Shamsul Islam Mollah	AITC	Julfikar Khan
74	Krishnaganj (SC)	CPM	Sushil Biswas	AITC	Bidhan Chandra Poddar
75	Krishnanagar East	CPM	Radhanath Biswas	AITC	Mukherjee Shibdas
76	Krishnanagar West	CPM	Sunil Kumar Ghosh	AITC	Ujjal Biswas
77	Nabadwip	CPM	Jamuna Brahmachari	AITC	Pundarikakshya Saha
78	Santipur	RCPI	Asim Ghosh	INC	Ajoy Dey
79	HanskhalI (SC)	CPM	Nayan Sarkar	AITC	Abir Ranjan Biswas
80	Ranaghat East (SC)	CPM	Asim Bala	AITC	Dr. Ramendra Nath Biswas
81	Ranaghat West	CPM	Jyotirmoyee Sikdar	INC	Sankar Singha
82	Chakdaha	CPM	Satyasadhan Chakraborty	AITC	Gouri Sankar Dutta
83	Haringhata	CPM	Bankim Ghosh	AITC	Saradindu Biswas
84	Bagdaha (SC)	AIFB	Kamalakshmi Biswas	AITC	Dulal Ch. Bar
85	Bongaon	CPM	Pankaj Ghosh	AITC	Prosanto Nath
86	Gaighata	CPM	Manmatha Roy	AITC	Jyotipriya Mallick
87	Habra	CPM	Amitava Nandi	AITC	Tapati Dutta
88	Ashokenagar	CPM	Sarmista Dutta	AITC	Ashoke Krishna Dutt
89	Amdanga	CPM	Hashim Abdul Halim	AITC	Dr. M. Nuruzzaman
90	Barasat	AIFB	Saral Deb	AITC	Ashoke (Gopal) Mukherjee
91	Rajarhat (SC)	CPM	Rabindra Nath Mandal	AITC	Tanmoy Mondal
92	Deganga	AIFB	Md. Yakub	AITC	Abdur Rouf
93	Swarupnagar	CPM	Mustafa Bin Quasem	AITC	Swaraj Misra
94	Baduria	CPM	Sambhu Biswas	INC	Qazi Abdul Gaffar
95	Basirhat	CPM	Narayan Mukherjee	AITC	Souren Sen
96	Hasnabad	CPM	Gautam Deb	AITC	Rafiqul Islam Mondal
97	Haroa (SC)	CPM	Kshiti Ranjan Mondal	INC	Lakshmikanta Mandal
98	Sandeshkhali (SC)	CPM	Kanti Biswas	AITC	Ranjit Kumar Das
99	Hingalganj (SC)	CPM	Gayen Nripen	AITC	Sourendra Mondal
100	Gosaba (SC)	RSP	Ganesh Mondal	AITC	Sujit Pramanik
101	Basanti (SC)	RSP	Subhas Naskar	AITC	Jayanta Naskar
102	Kultali (SC)	CPM	Ram Sankar Halder	INC	Bhagirath Gayen
103	Joynagar	CPM	Abul Hossain Laskar	AITC	Gour Sarkar
104	Baruipur	CPM	Dr. Sujan Chakraborty	AITC	Arup Bhadra
105	Canning West (SC)	CPM	Bimal Mistry	AITC	Gobinda Chandra Naskar
106	Canning East	CPM	Abdur Razzak Molla	INC	Mujibar Rahaman Kayal
107	Bhangar	CPM	Badal Zamadar	AITC	Abdus Sattar Mollah
108	Jadavpur	CPM	Buddhadev Bhattacharjee	AITC	Madhabi Mukherjee
109	Sonarpur (SC)	CPM	Abha Mandal	AITC	Nirmal Chandra Mandal
110	Bishnupur East (SC)	CPM	Ananda Biswas	AITC	Dilip Mondal
111	Bishnupur West	CPM	Rathin Sarkar	AITC	Subrata Bakshi
112	Behala East	CPM	Kumkum Chakraborti	AITC	Parash Dutta
113	Behala West	CPM	Nirmal Mukherjee	AITC	Partha Chatterjee
114	Garden Reach	CPM	Amin Mohammed	AITC	Fazle Azim Molla
115	Maheshtala	CPM	Mursalin Molla	AITC	Biman Banerjee
116	Budge Budge	CPM	Kali Bhandari	AITC	Ashok Kumar Deb
117	Satgachia	CPM	Gokul Bairagi	AITC	Sonali Guha
118	Falta	CPM	Malina Mistry	AITC	Tamonash Ghosh
119	Diamond Harbour	CPM	Rishi Haldar	AITC	Amjad Ali Sardar
120	Magrahat West	CPM	Noorar Rahaman	AITC	Giasuddin Molla
121	Magrahat East (SC)	CPM	Bansari Mohan Kanji	AITC	Namita Saha
122	Mandirbazar (SC)	CPM	Nikunja Paik	AITC	Choudhury Mohan Jatua
123	Mathurapur	CPM	Kanti Ganguly	AITC	Satya Ranjan Bapuli
124	Kulpi (SC)	CPM	Sakuntala Paik	AITC	Jagaranjan Haldar
125	Patharpratima	CPM	Jajneswar Das	AITC	Samir Jana
126	Kakdwip	CPM	Ashok Giri	AITC	Manturam Pakhira
127	Sagar	CPM	Pravanjan Mondal	AITC	Bankim Chandra Hazra
128	Bijpur	CPM	Jagadish Chandra Das	AITC	Jagadish Das
129	Naihati	CPM	Ranjit Kundu	AITC	Adhikari Tarun
130	Bhatpara	CPM	Ramprasad Kundu	AITC	Arjun Singh
131	Jagatdal	AIFB	Haripada Biswas	AITC	Mukul Roy
132	Noapara	CPM	Madan Mohan Nath	AITC	Manju Basu
133	Titagarh	CPM	Pravin Kr. Shaw	AITC	Ashok Shukla
134	Khardah	CPM	Asim Kumar Dasgupta	AITC	Ranjit Kumar Mukherjee
135	Panihati	CPM	Kamal Sengupta Basu	AITC	Nirmal Ghosh
136	Kamarhati	CPM	Manas Mukherjee	AITC	Chitta Ranjan Bag
137	Baranagar	RSP	Amar Chaudhuri	AITC	Atin Ghosh
138	Dum Dum	CPM	Ajit Chowdhury	AITC	Arunava Ghosh
139	Belgachia East	CPM	Chakraborti Subhas	AITC	Sujit Bose
140	Cossipur	CPM	Bijoy Bhattacharjee	AITC	Bandyopadhyay Tarak
141	Shyampukur	AIFB	Subrata Bose	AITC	Pulak Chandra Das
142	Jorabagan	CPM	Sudhangshu Seal	AITC	Sanjoy Bakshi
143	Jorasanko	AIFB	Shyam Sundar Gupta	AITC	Satya Narayan Bajaj
144	Bara Bazar	RJD	Md. Asiruddin	AITC	Tapas Roy
145	Bow Bazar	CPM	Ajit Pandey	AITC	Nayna Bandyopadhyay
146	Chowringhee	JD(S)	Zahid Hossain	AITC	Subrata Mukherjee
147	Kabitirtha	AIFB	Moinuddin Shams	INC	Ram Pyare Ram
148	Alipore	CPM	Mira Bhowmick	AITC	Tapas Paul
149	Rashbehari Avenue	JD(S)	Sitaram Behani	AITC	Sobhandeb Chattopadhyay
150	Tollygunge	CPM	Goutam Banerjee	AITC	Pankaj Banerjee
151	Dhakuria	RSP	Kshiti Goswami	AITC	Sougata Ray
152	Ballygunge	CPM	Rabin Deb	AITC	Kakoli Ghosh Dastidar
153	Entally	CPM	Md. Salim	AITC	Sultan Ahmed
154	Taltola (SC)	CPM	Debesh Das	AITC	Dilip Kumar Das
155	Beliaghata	CPM	Manabendra Mukherjee	AITC	Ajoy Sanyal
156	Sealdah	CPI	Chanchal Ghosh	INC	Somendra Nath Mitra
157	Vidyasagar	CPM	Lakshmi Kanta Dey	AITC	Mahua Mondal
158	Burtola	RSP	Kalyan Mukherjee	AITC	Sadhan Pande
159	Manicktola	CPM	Shyamal Chakraborty	AITC	Paresh Paul
160	Belgachia West	CPM	Rajdeo Goala	AITC	Dr. Sudipta Roy
161	Bally	CPM	Kanika Ganguly	INC	Supriyo Basu
162	Howrah North	CPM	Lagan Deo Singh	INC	Asok Ghosh
163	Howrah Central	CPM	Subir Ranjan Das	AITC	Ambica Banerjee
164	Howrah South	CPM	Badal Basu	AITC	Arup Roy
165	Shibpur	AIFB	Nepal Kanti Bhattacharjee	AITC	Jatu Lahiri
166	Domjur	CPM	Padma Nidhi Dhar	AITC	Brajamohan Majumder
167	Jagatballavpur	CPM	M. Ansaruddin	AITC	Biman Chakrabarty
168	Panchla	AIFB	Sri Sailen Mondal	AITC	Sk. Nazrul Islam
169	Sankrail (SC)	CPM	Bikash Mondal	AITC	Sital Kumar Sardar
170	Uluberia North (SC)	CPM	Mohon Mondal	AITC	Ram Janam Manjhi
171	Uluberia South	AIFB	Rabindra Ghosh	AITC	Bani Kumar Singha
172	Shyampur	AIFB	Jaladhar Samanta	AITC	Kalipada Mandal
173	Bagnan	CPM	Nirupama Chatterjee	AITC	Sabuj Dutta
174	Kalyanpur	CPM	Rabindranath Mitra	INC	Asit Mitra
175	Amta	CPM	Pratyush Mukherjee	AITC	Asok Maji
176	Udaynarayanpur	CPM	Chowdhury Nonigopal	AITC	Sukhendu Sekhar Roy
177	Jangipara	CPM	Ibha Dey	AITC	Shahzabin Khan Munshi
178	Chanditala	CPM	Bhaktaram Pan	AITC	Amit Mitra
179	Uttarpara	CPM	Jyoti Krishna Chattopadhyay	AITC	Prof. Swaraj Mukherjee
180	Serampore	CPI	Dhirendra Nath Dasgupta	AITC	Ratna De (Nag)
181	Champdani	CPM	Kaji Abdul Hai	INC	Abdul Mannan
182	Chandernagore	CPM	Ratan Lal Dasgupta	INC	Kamal Mukherjee
183	Singur	CPM	Bidyut Kumar Das	AITC	Rabindranath Bhattacharya
184	Haripal	CPM	Kaliprasad Biswas	AITC	Samiran Mitra
185	Tarakeswar	IND	Pratim Chatterjee	INC	Mohan Ghosh
186	Chinsurah	AIFB	Naren Dey	AITC	Robin Mukherjee
187	Bansberia	CPM	Ashutosh Mukhopadhyay	AITC	Tapan Dasgupta
188	Balagarh (SC)	CPM	Dibakanta Routh	AITC	Lakshmi Parui
189	Pandua	CPM	Ali Sk. Majed	AITC	Sailen Chattopadhyay
190	Polba	CPM	Sakti Pada Khanra	AITC	Azizur Rahman
191	Dhaniakhali (SC)	AIFB	Kripa Sindhu Saha	AITC	Asima Patra
192	Pursurah	CPM	Nimai Mal	AITC	Sk. Parvez Rahman
193	Khanakul (SC)	CPM	Banshi Badan Maitra	AITC	Tarapada Dolui
194	Arambagh	CPM	Binoy Datta	AITC	Sk. Hasan Imam
195	Goghat (SC)	AIFB	Shiba Prasad Malick	INC	Haradhan Santra
196	Chandrakona	CPM	Gurupada Dutta	AITC	Kushari Prabir
197	Ghatal (SC)	CPM	Ratan Pakhira	AITC	Gopal Karak
198	Daspur	CPM	Chittaranjan Mukhopadhyay	AITC	Ajit Bhunia
199	Nandanpur	CPM	Omar Ali	AITC	Saumen Mahapatra
200	Panskura West	CPI	Chittaranjan Dasthakur	AITC	Jakiur Rahaman Khan
201	Panskura East	CPM	Sisir Sarkar	AITC	Biplab Ray Chowdhury
202	Tamluk	CPI	Santosh Rana	AITC	Nirbed Roy
203	Moyna	CPM	Dipak Bera	AITC	Bhusan Chandra Dolai
204	Mahishadal	CPM	Dr. Subrata Maiti	AITC	Dipak Kumar Ghosh
205	Sutahata (SC)	CPM	Nityanand Bera	AITC	Tushar Kanti Mondal
206	Nandigram	CPI	Illiyas Mahammad Sk.	AITC	Sunil Baran Maiti
207	Narghat	WBSP	Brahmamoy Nanda	AITC	Amiya Kanti Bhattacharjee
208	Bhagabanpur	CPM	Prasanta Pradhan	AITC	Ardhendu Maity
209	Khajuri (SC)	WBSP	Sunirmal Paik	AITC	Ramchandra Mandal
210	Contai North	CPM	Chakradhar Maikap	AITC	Jyotirmoy Kar
211	Contai South	CPI	Sukhendu Maiti	AITC	Adhikary Sisir
212	Ramnagar	CPM	Samares Das	AITC	Akhil Giri
213	Egra	IND	Sinha Prabodh Chandra	AITC	Tapan Kanti Kar
214	Mugberia	WBSP	Kiranmay Nanda	AITC	Adhikari Suvendu
215	Pataspur	CPI	Kamakhya Nandan Das	AITC	Mrinal Kanti Das
216	Sabang	CPM	Tushar Kanti Laya	INC	Manas Ranjan Bhunia
217	Pingla	IND	Ramapada Samanta	AITC	Raj Kumar Das
218	Debra	CPM	Sk. Jahangir Karim	AITC	Radha Kanta Maiti
219	Keshpur (SC)	CPM	Nanda Rani Dal	AITC	Rajani Kanta Doloi
220	Garhbeta East	CPM	Susanta Ghosh	AITC	Md. Rafique
221	Garhbeta West (SC)	CPM	Krishna Prasad Duley	IND	Biman Bisohi
222	Salbani	CPM	Khagendra Nath Mahata	AITC	Dinen Roy
223	Midnapore	CPI	Purnendu Sengupta	AITC	Gouri Ghosh
224	Kharagpur Town	CPM	Lalji Pandey	INC	Gyan Singh Sohanpal
225	Kharagpur Rural	CPM	Nazmul Haque	AITC	Ajit Kr. Maity
226	Keshiari (ST)	CPM	Maheswar Murmu	AITC	Shyam Mandi
227	Narayangarh	CPM	Surjya Kanta Mishra	AITC	Salil Kr. Das Pattanayak
228	Dantan	CPI	Nandagopal Bhattacharya	AITC	Bikram Chandra Pradhan
229	Nayagram (ST)	CPM	Bhutnath Saren	JMM	Mangal Hansda
230	Gopiballavpur	CPM	Bhabani Sankar Hatial	AITC	Samay Mandi
231	Jhargram	CPM	Mina Sanatani	AITC	Bangal Makhan Lal
232	Binpur (ST)	CPM	Sambhu Nath Mandi	IND	Chunibala Hansda
233	Banduan (ST)	CPM	Upendranath Hansda	JMM	Birsing Murmu
234	Manbazar	CPM	Mahata Shamyapyari	AITC	Sitaram Mahato
235	Balrampur (ST)	CPM	Bhandu Majhi	AITC	Lambodar Mandi
236	Arsa	AIFB	Nishikanta Mehta	JMM	Ajit Prasad Mahata
237	Jhalda	AIFB	Satya Ranjan Mahato	AITC	Bishnu Charan Mahata
238	Jaipur	AIFB	Bindeswar Mahato	INC	Shanti Ram Mahato
239	Purulia	CPM	Nikhil Mukherjee	AITC	Kamakshya Prasad Singh Deo
240	Para (SC)	CPM	Bilasibala Sahis	AITC	Mira Bauri
241	Raghunathpur (SC)	CPM	Uma Rani Bouri	AITC	Magaram Bouri
242	Kashipur (ST)	CPM	Rabindranath Hembram	AITC	Buddheshwar Saren
243	Hura	CPM	Abinas Mahata	AITC	Bikash Chandra Mahato
244	Taldangra	CPM	Monoranjan Patra	AITC	Dilip Panda
245	Raipur (ST)	CPM	Upen Kisku	JMM	Lalu Hansda
246	Ranibandh (ST)	CPM	Makar Tudu	JMM	Gopinath Saren
247	Indpur (SC)	CPI	Kiriti Bagdi	AITC	Madan Bouri
248	Chhatna	RSP	Subhas Goswami	AITC	Swapan Mondal
249	Gangajalghati (SC)	CPM	Bauri Ramcharan	AITC	Swapan Bouri
250	Barjora	CPM	Susmita Biswas	AITC	Sudhangshu Sekhar Tewari
251	Bankura	CPM	Partha De	AITC	Kashinath Misra
252	Onda	AIFB	Anil Mukherjee	INC	Sk. Sajahan
253	Vishnupur	CPM	Jayanta Chowdhury	AITC	Subhasish Batabyal
254	Kotulpur	CPM	Ghose Manasi	AITC	Das Sunil
255	Indas (SC)	CPM	Nanda Dulal Majhi	AITC	Purnima Lohar
256	Sonamukhi (SC)	CPM	Khan Sukhendu	AITC	Dipali Saha
257	Kulti	AIFB	Acharya Maniklal	AITC	Suhrid Basumallick
258	Barabani	CPM	Rudranath Mukherjee	AITC	Manik Upadhyay
259	Hirapur	RJD	Sohrab Ali	AITC	Malay Ghatak
260	Asansol	CPM	Goutam Roychoudhury	AITC	Kalyan Banerjee
261	Raniganj	CPM	Bansa Gopal Chowdhury	INC	Sampa Sarkar
262	Jamuria	CPM	Pelab Kabi	AITC	Shiudashan Nayar
263	Ukhra (SC)	CPM	Madan Bauri	AITC	Nirmal Maji
264	Durgapur-I	CPM	Mrinal Banerjee	INC	Chandra Sekhar Banerjee
265	Durgapur-II	CPM	Debabrata Banerjee	AITC	Apurba Mukherjee
266	Kanksa (SC)	CPM	Ankure Saresh	INC	Himangshu Kumar Mondal
267	Ausgram (SC)	CPM	Kartick Chandra Bag	AITC	Sukumar Mondal
268	Bhatar	CPM	Subhas Mandal	AITC	Hazra Banamali
269	Galsi	AIFB	Mehbub Mondal	INC	Ajijul Haque Mondal
270	Burdwan North	CPM	Adhikary Nisith	INC	Lakshmi Narayan Nayek
271	Burdwan South	CPM	Nirupam Sen	AITC	Paresh Chandra Sarkar
272	Khandaghosh (SC)	CPM	Jyotsna Singh	AITC	Banshi Badan Roy
273	Raina	CPM	Shyama Prosad Pal	AITC	Arup Kumar Das
274	Jamalpur (SC)	CPM	Samar Hazra	AITC	Ajay Pramanick
275	Memari	CPM	Chattopadhyay Tapas	AITC	Syed Mustaque Murshed
276	Kalna	CPM	Anju Kar	AITC	Banerjee Sridhar
277	Nadanghat	CPM	Ratan Das	AITC	Swapan Debnath
278	Manteswar	CPM	Abu Ayes Mondal	AITC	Narayan Hazra Choudhury
279	Purbasthali	CPM	Subrata Bhowal	AITC	Ansar Mondal
280	Katwa	CPM	Kanak Kanti Goswami	INC	Rabindranath Chatterjee
281	Mangalkot	CPM	Sadhana Mallik	AITC	Chandranath Mukherjee
282	Ketugram (SC)	CPM	Tamal Chandra Majhi	INC	Amar Ram
283	Nanur (SC)	CPM	Anand Gopal Das	AITC	Krishnagopal Majhi
284	Bolpur	RSP	Tapan Hore	AITC	Dr. Sushovan Banerjee
285	Labhpur	CPM	Nabanita Mukherjee	AITC	Arup Kumar Misra
286	Dubrajpur	AIFB	Bhakti Pada Ghosh	AITC	Sattick Roy
287	Rajnagar (SC)	AIFB	Bijoy Bagdi	AITC	Ashima Dhibar
288	Suri	CPM	Braja Mukherjee	AITC	Suniti Chattaraj
289	Mahammad Bazar	CPM	Dhiren Sen	AITC	Sailen Mahata
290	Mayureswar (SC)	CPM	Bishnu Let	AITC	Kestopada Bagdi
291	Rampurhat	AIFB	Md. Hannan	AITC	Asish Banerjee
292	Hansan (SC)	RCPI	Mihir Bain	INC	Asit Kumar Mal
293	Nalhati	AIFB	Kalimuddin Shams	INC	Sarif Hossain
294	Murarai	CPM	Dr. Qamre Elahi	AITC	Dr. Motahar Hossain

== Results ==
Left Front led by Communist Party of India (Marxist) won 196 seats, a majority. Chief Minister Buddhadeb Bhattacharjee was reelected as Chief Minister. Pankaj Kumar Banerjee of All India Trinamool Congress, took charge as Leader of the Opposition.

For the first time since 1971, no single party won a majority. This was also the first time since its landslide victory in 1977, that the ruling CPI(M) failed to win a majority on its own. As of 2022, this was also the last time that no single party won an outright majority.

Summary of results of the West Bengal Legislative Assembly election, 2001
Political Party	No. of candidates	No. of elected	Number of Votes	% of Votes	Seat change
Communist Party of India (Marxist)	211	143	13,402,603	36.59%	
All India Trinamool Congress	226	60	11,229,396	30.66%	
Indian National Congress	60	26	2,921,151	7.98%	
All India Forward Bloc	34	25	2,067,944	5.65%	
Revolutionary Socialist Party	23	17	1,256,951	3.43%	
Communist Party of India	13	7	655,237	1.79%	
West Bengal Socialist Party	4	4	246,407	0.67%	
Gorkha National Liberation Front	5	3	190,057	0.52%	
Independents	530	9	1,848,830	5.05%	
Total	1676	294	36,626,099		

Hashim Abdul Halim was nominated as Speaker of the Legislative Assembly, while Anil Kumar Mukherjee was nominated as Deputy Speaker.

=== Results by district ===
District	Seats					
District	Seats	Left	TMC	INC	IND	OTH
Cooch Behar	9	9	0	0	0	0
Jalpaiguri	12	11	0	1	0	0
Darjeeling	5	2	0	0	0	3
Uttar Dinajpur	7	3	1	2	1	0
Dakshin Dinajpur	5	5	0	0	0	0
Malda	11	6	0	5	0	0
Murshidabad	19	11	0	6	2	0
Nadia	15	10	3	2	0	0
North 24 Parganas	28	19	8	1	0	0
South 24 Parganas	28	12	14	0	2	0
Kolkata	21	8	11	2	0	0
Howrah	16	10	5	1	0	0
Hooghly	19	14	3	2	0	0
Purba Medinipur	17	9	8	0	0	0
Paschim Medinipur	20	18	1	1	0	0
Purulia	11	9	0	1	1	0
Bankura	13	12	1	0	0	0
Bardhaman	26	21	4	1	0	0
Birbhum	12	10	1	1	0	0
Total	294	199	60	26	6	3

== Elected members ==
Constituency		Poll%	Winner				Runner Up				Margin	%
#	Name	Poll%	Candidate	Party	Votes	%	Candidate	Party	Votes	%	Margin	%
1	Mekliganj (SC)	85.51	Paresh Adhikary	AIFB	65,351	51.18	Ramesh Roy	AITC	48,318	37.84	17,033	13.34
2	Sitalkuchi (SC)	86.56	Sudhir Pramanik	CPM	74,907	57.61	Birendra Barma	INC	29,345	22.57	45,562	35.04
3	Mathabhanga (SC)	83.29	Dinesh Dakua	CPM	68,340	53.86	Binoy Barman	AITC	41,375	32.61	26,965	21.25
4	Cooch Behar North	77.47	Dipak Sarker	AIFB	57,170	46.88	Mihir Goswami	AITC	38,813	31.83	18,357	15.05
5	Cooch Behar West	80.79	Akshoy Thakur	AIFB	74,713	54.67	Soumendra Chandra	AITC	43,834	32.07	30,879	22.60
6	Sitai	80.20	Nripendra Nath Roy	AIFB	66,717	47.31	Md Fazle Haque	INC	60,437	42.86	6,280	4.45
7	Dinhata	78.07	Kamal Guha	AIFB	72,887	53.05	Dipak Sengupta	AITC	53,167	38.70	19,720	14.35
8	Natabari	86.35	Tamser Ali	CPM	59,779	48.49	Rabindranath Ghosh	AITC	51,525	41.79	8,254	6.70
9	Tufanganj (SC)	82.56	Pushpa Das	CPM	70,909	58.52	Sachindra Das	AITC	35,224	29.07	35,685	29.45
10	Kumargram (ST)	75.95	Dasrath Tirkey	RSP	60,966	54.98	Paresh Das	AITC	27,782	25.05	33,184	29.93
11	Kalchini (ST)	68.79	Paban Lakra	INC	43,749	44.11	Mahonar Tirkey	RSP	38,815	39.14	4,934	4.97
12	Alipurduars	74.39	Nirmal Das	RSP	66,200	52.28	Prasanta Majumder	AITC	41,772	32.99	24,428	19.29
13	Falakata (SC)	78.21	Jogesh Barman	CPM	61,000	50.68	Anil Adhikary	AITC	43,977	36.54	17,023	14.14
14	Madarihat (ST)	71.13	Kumari Kujur	RSP	60,412	60.25	Narendra Karjee	AITC	18,905	18.85	41,507	41.40
15	Dhupguri (SC)	80.99	Lakshmi Roy	CPM	53,537	46.19	Ashoke Barman	AITC	30,691	26.48	22,846	19.71
16	Nagrakata (ST)	70.87	Chaitan Munda	CPM	60,287	52.76	Ganesh Oraon	AITC	33,180	29.04	27,107	23.72
17	Mainaguri (SC)	79.02	Bachchamohan Roy	RSP	55,238	45.90	Purnaprabha Barman	AITC	37,699	31.32	17,539	14.58
18	Mal (ST)	73.07	Somra Lakra	CPM	53,683	51.50	Shyam Bhagat	INC	40,811	39.15	12,872	12.35
19	Kranti	79.46	Sudhan Raha	CPM	51,475	47.37	Aburabbani Ahmed	AITC	31,204	28.72	20,271	18.65
20	Jalpaiguri	77.28	Gobinda Roy	AIFB	50,659	46.71	Anupam Sen	AITC	48,077	44.33	2,582	2.38
21	Rajganj (SC)	72.97	Jotindra Nath Roy	CPM	85,519	46.36	Khageswar Roy	AITC	61,591	33.39	23,928	12.97
22	Kalimpong	59.55	Goulan Lepcha	GNLF	51,983	57.67	Norden Lama	IND	26,979	29.93	25,004	27.74
23	Darjeeling	60.59	D.K. Pradhan	GNLF	66,839	63.49	Sawan Rai	IND	21,576	20.49	45,263	43.00
24	Kurseong	60.81	Shanta Chettri	GNLF	55,630	53.29	Tulsi Bhattrai	CPM	24,729	23.69	30,901	29.60
25	Siliguri	64.53	Asok Bhattacharya	CPM	88,110	48.03	Prasanta Nandy	AITC	65,229	35.56	22,881	12.47
26	Phansidewa (ST)	71.86	Prakash Minj	CPM	77,507	47.45	Mamla Kujur	INC	48,870	29.92	28,637	17.53
27	Chopra	82.33	Hamidul Rahaman	IND	54,954	47.37	Akbar Ali	CPM	53,843	46.42	1,111	0.95
28	Islampur	68.34	Abdul Chowdhary	AITC	50,785	45.98	Md. Faruque Azam	CPM	48,727	44.12	2,058	1.86
29	Goalpokhar	62.60	Hafiz Sairani	AIFB	47,999	44.20	Deepa Dasmunshi	INC	46,295	42.64	1,704	1.56
30	Karandighi	69.64	Gokul Roy	AIFB	61,543	44.38	Haji Hussain	INC	50,704	36.56	10,839	7.82
31	Raiganj (SC)	77.99	Chittaranjan Roy	INC	66,555	46.36	Harinarayan Roy	CPM	56,870	39.61	9,685	6.75
32	Kaliaganj (SC)	81.83	Pramathanath Roy	INC	57,697	44.07	Ramani Kanta Deb	CPM	54,572	41.68	3,125	2.39
33	Kushmandi (SC)	80.96	Narmada Chandra Roy	RSP	61,600	48.40	Jitendra Nath Sarkar	AITC	52,705	41.41	8,895	6.99
34	Itahar	82.96	Srikumar Mukherjee	CPI	54,605	42.26	Abedin Zainal	NCP	34,839	26.96	19,766	15.30
35	Gangarampur	83.27	Narayan Biswas	CPM	76,883	48.02	Biplab Mitra	AITC	70,767	44.20	6,116	3.82
36	Tapan (ST)	82.64	Khara Soren	RSP	58,892	49.34	Antony Uraw	AITC	49,993	41.88	8,899	7.46
37	Kumarganj	82.19	Khatun Mafuja	CPM	69,669	49.01	Nani Gopal Roy	AITC	56,379	39.66	13,290	9.35
38	Balurghat	80.73	Choudhury Biswanath	RSP	53,945	47.40	Shankar Chakravorti	AITC	51,222	45.01	2,723	2.39
39	Habibpur (ST)	67.50	Jadu Hemrom	CPM	43,992	46.42	Ramlal Hansda	BJP	25,798	27.22	18,194	19.20
40	Gajol (ST)	77.05	Sadhu Tudu	CPM	56,214	48.49	Nabakumar Hembrom	AITC	36,506	31.49	19,708	17.00
41	Kharba	75.59	Mahabul Haque	INC	56,819	49.38	Nazmul Hoque	CPM	48,395	42.06	8,424	7.32
42	Harishchandrapur	82.05	Alam Mostaque	INC	60,545	48.64	Birendra Maitra	AIFB	58,243	46.79	2,302	1.85
43	Ratua	78.53	Sailen Sarkar	CPM	55,125	50.31	Samar Mukherjee	INC	46,740	42.66	8,385	7.65
44	Araidanga	81.26	Sabitri Mitra	INC	53,124	49.34	Setara Begum	CPM	48,800	45.32	4,324	4.02
45	Malda (SC)	77.61	Subhendu Chowdhury	CPM	59,910	44.57	Phanibhusan Roy	AITC	49,442	36.78	10,468	7.79
46	English Bazar	77.34	Samar Roy	CPM	50,507	38.49	Goutam Chakraborty	INC	38,557	29.39	11,950	9.10
47	Manikchak	72.00	Asima Chowdhuri	CPM	48,239	48.89	Ram Probessh	INC	39,855	40.40	8,384	8.49
48	Sujapur	76.50	Rubi Noor	INC	54,836	53.01	Abdur Rauf	CPM	43,256	41.82	11,580	11.19
49	Kaliachak	80.23	Abu Hasem Chowdhury	INC	65,540	48.64	Biswanath Ghosh	CPM	58,176	43.17	7,364	5.47
50	Farakka	75.31	Mainul Haque	INC	57,193	50.54	Mir Tarekull Islam	CPM	46,006	40.65	11,187	9.89
51	Aurangabad	78.06	Humayun Reza	INC	55,362	45.16	Nur Mohammad	CPM	49,131	40.07	6,231	5.09
52	Suti	74.97	Jane Alam Mian	RSP	45,368	38.93	Md. Sahrab	IND	40,748	34.97	4,620	3.96
53	Sagardighi (SC)	76.67	Das Paresh Nath	CPM	53,883	48.40	Rajesh Kumar Bhakat	AITC	51,253	46.04	2,630	2.36
54	Jangipur	69.71	Abul Hasnat	RSP	49,132	42.78	Habibur Rahaman	IND	30,068	26.18	19,064	16.60
55	Lalgola	76.60	Abu Hena	INC	62,034	51.95	Md. Johaque Ali	CPM	52,900	44.30	9,134	7.65
56	Bhagabangola	77.81	Mojibor Rahaman	WBSP	51,285	43.85	Abu Sufian Sarkar	INC	49,569	42.38	1,716	1.47
57	Nabagram	80.86	Nripen Chaudhuri	CPM	65,609	49.46	Arit Majumder	INC	57,957	43.69	7,652	5.77
58	Murshidabad	79.59	Chhaya Ghosh	AIFB	69,572	46.85	Mannan Hossain	IND	46,578	31.37	22,994	15.48
59	Jalangi	81.03	Unus Ali Sarkar	CPM	69,288	47.82	Subrata Saha	INC	62,463	43.11	6,825	4.71
60	Domkal	82.19	Anisur Rahaman Sarkar	CPM	78,151	52.83	Rejaul Karim	INC	65,042	43.97	13,109	8.86
61	Naoda	73.89	Abu Taher Khan	IND	57,613	44.40	Jayanta Biswas	RSP	54,243	41.80	3,370	2.60
62	Hariharpara	81.19	Sk. Niamot	IND	62,959	45.66	Nizamuddin	CPM	50,479	36.61	12,480	9.05
63	Berhampore	68.42	Maya Rani Paul	INC	80,162	52.50	Kartick Sahana	RSP	50,251	32.91	29,911	19.59
64	Beldanga	64.89	Golam Kibria Mia	INC	64,597	55.82	Timir Baran Bhaduri	RSP	39,727	34.33	24,870	21.49
65	Kandi	68.97	Atish Chandra Sinha	INC	64,060	51.27	Chandan Sen	CPI	37,100	29.70	26,960	21.57
66	Khargram (SC)	71.93	Biswanath Mondal	CPM	58,770	48.90	Madhab Marjit	INC	53,099	44.18	5,671	4.72
67	Barwan	72.38	Amalendralal Roy	RSP	54,314	46.75	Tapas Dasgupta	INC	45,645	39.29	8,669	7.46
68	Bharatpur	74.50	Id. Mohammad	RSP	55,667	47.51	Debasish Chatterjee	IND	49,955	42.63	5,712	4.88
69	Karimpur	80.68	Prafull Bhowmick	CPM	62,398	46.82	Chira Ranjan Mondal	AITC	55,580	41.71	6,818	5.11
70	Palashipara	80.32	Kamalendu Sanyal	CPM	57,176	43.01	Tapas Kumar Saha	AITC	55,595	41.82	1,581	1.19
71	Nakashipara	79.49	Kallol Khan	AITC	51,301	41.69	Sekh Khabir Uddin	CPM	47,948	38.97	3,353	2.72
72	Kaliganj	74.89	Dhananjoy Modak	RSP	44,328	36.69	Abdus Salam Munshi	AITC	31,806	26.33	12,522	10.36
73	Chapra	81.47	Shamsul Islam Mollah	CPM	57,941	44.88	Zulfikar Khan	AITC	53,913	41.76	4,028	3.12
74	Krishnaganj (SC)	80.41	Sushil Biswas	CPM	53,395	44.82	Bidhan Chandra Poddar	AITC	52,854	44.37	541	0.45
75	Krishnagar East	77.26	Mukherjee Shibdas	AITC	71,489	52.37	Radhanath Biswas	CPM	55,148	40.40	16,341	11.97
76	Krishnagar West	81.35	Sunil Kumar Ghosh	CPM	51,909	45.26	Ujjal Biswas	AITC	44,661	38.94	7,248	6.32
77	Nabadwip	80.17	Pundarikakshya Saha	AITC	59,466	49.45	Jamuna Brahmachari	CPM	51,519	42.84	7,947	6.61
78	Santipur	83.84	Ajoy Dey	INC	69,117	42.99	Badal Basak	IND	47,541	29.57	21,576	13.42
79	Hanskhali (SC)	84.17	Nayan Sarkar	CPM	72,334	45.80	Abir Ranjan Biswas	AITC	69,813	44.20	2,521	1.60
80	Ranaghat East (SC)	81.44	Asim Bala	CPM	75,973	45.33	Ramendra Nath Biswas	AITC	71,630	42.74	4,343	2.59
81	Ranaghat West	85.05	Sankar Singha	INC	81,058	52.00	Jyotirmoyee Sikdar	CPM	65,347	41.92	15,711	10.08
82	Chakdaha	81.52	Satyasadhan Chakraborty	CPM	95,980	49.82	Gouri Sankar Dutta	AITC	79,480	41.26	16,500	8.56
83	Haringhata	80.46	Bankim Ghosh	CPM	72,000	43.89	Saradindu Biswas	AITC	65,628	40.01	6,372	3.88
84	Bagdaha (SC)	85.37	Kamalakshmi Biswas	AIFB	61,936	45.65	Dulal Ch. Bar	AITC	61,699	45.48	237	0.17
85	Bongaon	82.37	Pankaj Ghosh	CPM	66,561	44.93	Bhupendra Nath Seth	IND	44,595	30.10	21,966	14.83
86	Gaighata	84.91	Jyotipriya Mallick	AITC	85,652	52.17	Manmatha Roy	CPM	73,962	45.05	11,690	7.12
87	Habra	80.31	Tapati Dutta	AITC	69,229	46.13	Amitava Nandi	CPM	65,494	43.64	3,735	2.49
88	Ashokenagar	81.31	Sarmista Dutta	CPM	64,288	45.18	Ashoke Krishna Dutt	AITC	62,579	43.98	1,709	1.20
89	Amdanga	81.07	Hashim Abdul Halim	CPM	65,534	46.74	Dr. M. Nuruzzaman	AITC	65,470	46.69	64	0.05
90	Barasat	75.25	Ashoke Mukherjee	AITC	107,948	47.35	Saral Deb	AIFB	101,201	44.39	6,747	2.96
91	Rajarhat (SC)	77.69	Tanmoy Mondal	AITC	96,394	46.93	Rabindra Nath Mandal	CPM	95,246	46.37	1,148	0.56
92	Deganga	78.75	Md. Yakub	AIFB	53,993	46.03	Abdur Rouf	AITC	28,115	23.97	25,878	22.06
93	Swarupnagar	80.89	Mustafa Bin Quasem	CPM	58,046	45.30	Swaraj Misra	AITC	51,463	40.16	6,583	5.14
94	Baduria	82.12	Qazi Abdul Gaffar	INC	63,277	51.26	Sambhu Biswas	CPM	52,521	42.55	10,756	8.71
95	Basirhat	73.98	Narayan Mukherjee	CPM	62,696	46.43	Souren Sen	AITC	34,976	25.90	27,720	20.53
96	Hasnabad	82.50	Gautam Deb	CPM	56,573	49.67	Rafiqul Islam Mondal	AITC	52,592	46.17	3,981	3.50
97	Haroa (SC)	81.33	Kshiti Ranjan Mondal	CPM	78,749	58.41	Lakshmikanta Mandal	INC	43,489	32.26	35,260	26.15
98	Sandeshkhali (SC)	79.59	Kanti Biswas	CPM	65,214	54.53	Ranjit Kumar Das	AITC	38,110	31.87	27,104	22.66
99	Hingalganj (SC)	79.43	Gayen Nripen	CPM	62,441	54.06	Sourendra Mondal	AITC	44,186	38.26	18,255	15.80
100	Gosaba (SC)	74.47	Ganesh Mondal	RSP	55,333	51.93	Sujit Pramanik	AITC	40,161	37.69	15,172	14.24
101	Basanti (SC)	76.77	Subhas Naskar	RSP	81,177	59.17	Jayanta Naskar	AITC	50,829	37.05	30,348	22.12
102	Kultali (SC)	76.94	Prabodh Purkait	IND	60,029	46.87	Ram Sankar Halder	CPM	55,761	43.54	4,268	3.33
103	Joynagar	74.24	Debaprasad Sarkar	IND	49,534	40.14	Abul Hossain Laskar	CPM	33,853	27.43	15,681	12.71
104	Baruipur	75.75	Arup Bhadra	AITC	71,340	47.27	Dr. Sujan Chakraborty	CPM	71,335	47.27	5	0.00
105	Canning West (SC)	72.38	Gobinda Chandra Naskar	AITC	60,581	44.91	Bimal Mistry	CPM	55,623	41.23	4,958	3.68
106	Canning East	80.12	Abdur Razzak Molla	CPM	82,062	70.20	Mujibar Rahaman Kayal	INC	26,303	22.50	55,759	47.70
107	Bhangar	83.03	Badal Zamadar	CPM	71,578	54.10	Abdus Sattar Mollah	AITC	53,298	40.28	18,280	13.82
108	Jadavpur	75.56	Buddhadev Bhattacharjee	CPM	110,011	54.60	Madhabi Mukherjee	AITC	80,730	40.06	29,281	14.54
109	Sonarpur (SC)	74.24	Nirmal Chandra Mandal	AITC	99,893	49.07	Abha Mandal	CPM	91,829	45.11	8,064	3.96
110	Bishnupur East (SC)	77.41	Dilip Mondal	AITC	54,167	50.63	Ananda Biswas	CPM	47,586	44.48	6,581	6.15
111	Bishnupur West	76.39	Subrata Bakshi	AITC	61,303	49.10	Rathin Sarkar	CPM	54,576	43.71	6,727	5.39
112	Behala East	72.28	Parash Dutta	AITC	90,190	48.06	Kumkum Chakraborti	CPM	86,727	46.21	3,463	1.85
113	Behala West	72.07	Partha Chatterjee	AITC	90,409	53.11	Nirmal Mukherjee	CPM	70,932	41.67	19,477	11.44
114	Garden Reach	71.93	Amin Mohammed	CPM	77,681	60.72	Fazle Azim Molla	AITC	45,757	35.77	31,924	24.95
115	Maheshtala	75.25	Mursalin Molla	CPM	72,425	52.50	Biman Banerjee	AITC	60,209	43.65	12,216	8.85
116	Budge Budge	74.45	Ashok Kumar Deb	AITC	70,467	57.03	Kali Bhandari	CPM	47,694	38.60	22,773	18.43
117	Satgachia	76.13	Sonali Guha	AITC	56,325	46.65	Gokul Bairagi	CPM	50,314	41.68	6,011	4.97
118	Falta	72.24	Tamonash Ghosh	AITC	43,697	43.55	Malina Mistry	CPM	41,559	41.42	2,138	2.13
119	Diamond Harbour	70.97	Rishi Haldar	CPM	50,648	41.60	Amjad Ali Sardar	AITC	47,906	39.34	2,742	2.26
120	Magrahat West	68.18	Noorar Rahaman	CPM	49,745	46.09	Giasuddin Molla	AITC	38,167	35.36	11,578	10.73
121	Magrahat East (SC)	74.22	Bansari Mohan Kanji	CPM	57,680	47.59	Namita Saha	AITC	56,400	46.54	1,280	1.05
122	Mandirbazar (SC)	74.61	Choudhury Mohan Jatua	AITC	59,492	49.10	Nikunja Paik	CPM	52,618	43.43	6,874	5.67
123	Mathurapur	80.83	Kanti Ganguly	CPM	64,609	46.43	Satya Ranjan Bapuli	AITC	62,228	44.72	2,381	1.71
124	Kulpi (SC)	73.01	Jagaranjan Haldar	AITC	51,045	49.03	Sakuntala Paik	CPM	46,966	45.11	4,079	3.92
125	Patharpratima	81.00	Jajneswar Das	CPM	56,475	46.99	Samir Jana	AITC	55,620	46.28	855	0.71
126	Kakdwip	82.24	Manturam Pakhira	AITC	58,872	47.93	Ashok Giri	CPM	58,367	47.52	505	0.41
127	Sagar	88.16	Bankim Chandra Hazra	AITC	70,086	48.40	Pravanjan Mondal	CPM	69,512	48.01	574	0.39
128	Bijpur	84.56	Jagadish Chandra Das	CPM	102,249	77.97	Jagadish Das	AITC	26,229	20.00	76,020	57.97
129	Naihati	82.00	Ranjit Kundu	CPM	77,593	57.23	Adhikari Tarun	AITC	48,937	36.09	28,656	21.14
130	Bhatpara	67.09	Arjun Singh	AITC	53,467	55.31	Ramprasad Kundu	CPM	36,669	37.93	16,798	17.38
131	Jagatdal	80.57	Haripada Biswas	AIFB	70,143	52.03	Mukul Roy	AITC	56,741	42.09	13,402	9.94
132	Noapara	78.90	Manju Basu	AITC	50,318	50.21	Madan Mohan Nath	CPM	45,872	45.78	4,446	4.43
133	Titagarh	77.12	Pravin Kr. Shaw	CPM	53,500	55.42	Ashok Shukla	AITC	37,254	38.59	16,246	16.83
134	Khardah	80.60	Asim Kumar Dasgupta	CPM	91,104	53.46	Ranjit Kumar Mukherjee	AITC	67,360	39.53	23,744	13.93
135	Panihati	72.60	Nirmal Ghosh	AITC	77,726	51.33	Kamal Sengupta Basu	CPM	63,838	42.16	13,888	9.17
136	Kamarhati	74.98	Manas Mukherjee	CPM	70,802	52.00	Chitta Ranjan Bag	AITC	55,290	40.61	15,512	11.39
137	Baranagar	77.88	Amar Chaudhuri	RSP	85,647	48.08	Atin Ghosh	AITC	83,106	46.66	2,541	1.42
138	Dum Dum	74.45	Arunava Ghosh	AITC	81,228	46.70	Ajit Chowdhury	CPM	81,004	46.57	224	0.13
139	Belgharia East	71.36	Chakraborti Subhas	CPM	106,753	48.06	Sujit Bose	AITC	102,309	46.06	4,444	2.00
140	Cossipur	62.53	Bandyopadhyay Tarak	AITC	33,837	51.29	Bijoy Bhattacharjee	CPM	28,061	42.54	5,776	8.75
141	Shyampukur	66.76	Subrata Bose	AIFB	30,602	49.90	Pulak Chandra Das	AITC	27,277	44.48	3,325	5.42
142	Jorabagan	44.83	Sudhangshu Seal	CPM	18,738	41.53	Sanjoy Bakshi	AITC	16,336	36.20	2,402	5.33
143	Jorasanko	46.58	Satya Narayan Bajaj	AITC	14,847	38.96	Shyam Sundar Gupta	AIFB	14,069	36.92	778	2.04
144	Bara Bazar	32.41	Tapas Roy	AITC	10,592	37.51	Md. Asiruddin	RJD	8,293	29.37	2,299	8.14
145	Bow Bazar	43.34	Nayna Bandyopadhyay	AITC	27,840	55.13	Ajit Pandey	CPM	15,891	31.47	11,949	23.66
146	Chowringhee	42.14	Subrata Mukherjee	AITC	39,728	66.58	Zahid Hossain	JDS	14,367	24.08	25,361	42.50
147	Kabitirtha	47.75	Ram Pyare Ram	INC	45,997	53.53	Moinuddin Shams	AIFB	33,167	38.60	12,830	14.93
148	Alipore	51.47	Tapas Paul	AITC	41,719	58.53	Mira Bhowmick	CPM	23,201	32.55	18,518	25.98
149	Rashbehari Avenue	52.11	Sobhandeb Ch.	AITC	41,562	64.33	Sitaram Behani	JDS	14,174	21.94	27,388	42.39
150	Tollygunge	66.86	Pankaj Banerjee	AITC	50,124	49.74	Goutam Banerjee	CPM	44,593	44.25	5,531	5.49
151	Dhakuria	67.76	Sougata Ray	AITC	62,059	48.97	Kshiti Goswami	RSP	57,427	45.31	4,632	3.66
152	Ballygunge	57.80	Rabin Deb	CPM	59,931	47.36	Kakoli Ghosh Dastidar	AITC	56,582	44.71	3,349	2.65
153	Entally	55.89	Md. Salim	CPM	44,720	51.65	Sultan Ahmed	AITC	38,490	44.46	6,230	7.19
154	Taltola (SC)	57.06	Debesh Das	CPM	37,023	47.01	Dilip Kumar Das	AITC	36,189	45.95	834	1.06
155	Beliaghata	67.89	Manabendra Mukherjee	CPM	48,600	48.19	Ajoy Sanyal	AITC	47,103	46.71	1,497	1.48
156	Sealdah	50.98	Somendra Nath Mitra	INC	27,877	64.29	Chanchal Ghosh	CPI	12,186	28.10	15,691	36.19
157	Vidyasagar	54.76	Lakshmi Kanta Dey	CPM	33,994	51.55	Mahua Mondal	AITC	30,103	45.65	3,891	5.90
158	Burtola	58.33	Sadhan Pande	AITC	43,942	63.76	Kalyan Mukherjee	RSP	18,682	27.11	25,260	36.65
159	Manicktola	67.84	Paresh Paul	AITC	59,626	49.57	Shyamal Chakraborty	CPM	54,117	44.99	5,509	4.58
160	Belgachia West	76.80	Rajdeo Goala	CPM	62,016	57.97	Dr. Sudipta Roy	AITC	40,414	37.78	21,602	20.19
161	Bally	78.24	Kanika Ganguly	CPM	92,876	72.63	Supriyo Basu	INC	32,423	25.36	60,453	47.27
162	Howrah North	75.60	Lagan Deo Singh	CPM	103,410	71.03	Asok Ghosh	INC	31,795	21.84	71,615	49.19
163	Howrah Central	59.29	Ambica Banerjee	AITC	47,222	55.89	Subir Ranjan Das	CPM	27,834	32.94	19,388	22.95
164	Howrah South	64.86	Badal Basu	CPM	55,159	52.49	Arup Roy	AITC	46,708	44.45	8,451	8.04
165	Shibpur	70.98	Jatu Lahiri	AITC	105,921	51.05	Nepal Bhattacharjee	AIFB	92,703	44.68	13,218	6.37
166	Domjur	70.67	Padma Nidhi Dhar	CPM	94,502	51.95	Brajamohan Majumder	AITC	78,258	43.02	16,244	8.93
167	Jagatballavpur	73.42	Biman Chakrabarty	AITC	64,095	46.02	M. Ansaruddin	CPM	63,488	45.58	607	0.44
168	Panchla	68.75	Sri Sailen Mondal	AIFB	59,986	48.15	Sk. Nazrul Islam	AITC	32,170	25.82	27,816	22.33
169	Sankrail (SC)	69.62	Sital Kumar Sardar	AITC	67,304	49.04	Bikash Mondal	CPM	59,622	43.45	7,682	5.59
170	Uluberia North (SC)	67.11	Mohon Mondal	CPM	55,931	47.41	Ram Janam Manjhi	AITC	48,710	41.29	7,221	6.12
171	Uluberia South	72.03	Rabindra Ghosh	AIFB	60,878	50.84	Bani Kumar Singha	AITC	48,356	40.39	12,522	10.45
172	Shyampur	78.56	Kalipada Mandal	AITC	63,471	50.60	Jaladhar Samanta	AIFB	56,104	44.73	7,367	5.87
173	Bagnan	74.27	Nirupama Chatterjee	CPM	61,857	48.18	Sabuj Dutta	AITC	58,920	45.90	2,937	2.28
174	Kalyanpur	74.67	Asit Mitra	INC	53,785	48.29	Rabindranath Mitra	CPM	53,012	47.60	773	0.69
175	Amta	79.06	Pratyush Mukherjee	CPM	60,363	49.38	Asok Maji	AITC	56,929	46.57	3,434	2.81
176	Udaynarayanpur	78.76	Chowdhury Nonigopal	CPM	66,269	54.84	Sukhendu Sekhar Roy	AITC	48,372	40.03	17,897	14.81
177	Jangipara	77.87	Ibha Dey	CPM	65,575	49.53	Shahzabin Khan Munshi	AITC	59,278	44.77	6,297	4.76
178	Chanditala	71.55	Bhaktaram Pan	CPM	70,499	47.55	Amit Mitra	AITC	69,663	46.98	836	0.57
179	Uttarpara	69.98	Prof. Swaraj Mukherjee	AITC	71,699	48.26	Jyoti Chattopadhyay	CPM	69,931	47.07	1,768	1.19
180	Serampore	59.29	Ratna De (Nag)	AITC	35,905	35.02	Kesto Mukherjee	IND	30,547	29.80	5,358	5.22
181	Champdani	64.55	Abdul Mannan	INC	72,433	50.12	Kaji Abdul Hai	CPM	57,288	39.64	15,145	10.48
182	Chandernagore	73.33	Kamal Mukherjee	INC	65,590	48.04	Ratan Lal Dasgupta	CPM	62,504	45.78	3,086	2.26
183	Singur	80.68	Rabindranath Bhattacharya	AITC	69,047	49.45	Bidyut Kumar Das	CPM	64,277	46.04	4,770	3.41
184	Haripal	81.42	Kaliprasad Biswas	CPM	71,724	55.52	Samiran Mitra	AITC	50,708	39.25	21,016	16.27
185	Tarakeswar	83.04	Pratim Chatterjee	IND	69,186	54.55	Mohan Ghosh	INC	40,274	31.75	28,912	22.80
186	Chinsurah	76.67	Naren Dey	AIFB	70,104	48.02	Robin Mukherjee	AITC	68,259	46.76	1,845	1.26
187	Bansberia	77.48	Ashutosh Mukhopadhyay	CPM	60,818	47.82	Tapan Dasgupta	AITC	60,342	47.44	476	0.38
188	Balagarh (SC)	77.98	Dibakanta Routh	CPM	59,376	47.35	Lakshmi Parui	AITC	53,654	42.79	5,722	4.56
189	Pandua	77.93	Ali Sk. Majed	CPM	76,613	53.56	Sailen Chattopadhyay	AITC	59,466	41.57	17,147	11.99
190	Polba	80.84	Sakti Pada Khanra	CPM	66,234	51.88	Azizur Rahman	AITC	58,470	45.80	7,764	6.08
191	Dhaniakhali (SC)	84.15	Kripa Sindhu Saha	AIFB	76,506	58.12	Asima Patra	AITC	49,982	37.97	26,524	20.15
192	Pursurah	84.86	Nimai Mal	CPM	89,211	66.86	Sk. Parvez Rahman	AITC	37,994	28.48	51,217	38.38
193	Khanakul (SC)	79.13	Banshi Badan Maitra	CPM	97,307	70.09	Tarapada Dolui	AITC	34,933	25.16	62,374	44.93
194	Arambagh	82.14	Binoy Datta	CPM	127,429	78.95	Sk. Hasan Imam	AITC	26,963	16.71	100,466	62.24
195	Goghat (SC)	84.94	Shiba Prasad Malick	AIFB	119,236	79.18	Haradhan Santra	INC	22,427	14.89	96,809	64.29
196	Chandrakona	86.09	Gurupada Dutta	CPM	88,230	62.08	Kushari Prabir	AITC	46,689	32.85	41,541	29.23
197	Ghatal (SC)	78.94	Ratan Pakhira	CPM	68,464	55.15	Gopal Karak	AITC	49,129	39.58	19,335	15.57
198	Daspur	79.61	Ajit Bhunia	AITC	58,202	50.49	Chittaranjan Mukh.	CPM	53,883	46.75	4,319	3.74
199	Nandanpur	84.97	Saumen Mahapatra	AITC	56,561	48.05	Omar Ali	CPM	55,276	46.96	1,285	1.09
200	Panskura West	82.40	Chittaranjan Dasthakur	CPI	64,940	50.33	Jakiur Rahaman Khan	AITC	58,590	45.41	6,350	4.92
201	Panskura East	83.51	Biplab Ray Chowdhury	AITC	64,805	47.88	Sisir Sarkar	CPM	62,499	46.18	2,306	1.70
202	Tamluk	86.69	Nirbed Roy	AITC	69,630	49.78	Santosh Rana	CPI	62,184	44.45	7,446	5.33
203	Moyna	85.32	Dipak Bera	CPM	66,292	49.02	Bhusan Chandra Dolai	AITC	60,840	44.99	5,452	4.03
204	Mahishadal	84.79	Dipak Kumar Ghosh	AITC	60,118	50.55	Dr. Subrata Maiti	CPM	52,220	43.91	7,898	6.64
205	Sutahata (SC)	85.61	Nityanand Bera	CPM	84,845	48.86	Tushar Kanti Mondal	AITC	81,709	47.05	3,136	1.81
206	Nandigram	81.38	Illiyas Mahammad Sk.	CPI	67,544	51.50	Sunil Baran Maiti	AITC	59,540	45.40	8,004	6.10
207	Narghat	87.52	Brahmamoy Nanda	WBSP	67,396	49.14	Amiya Kanti Bhattacharjee	AITC	64,769	47.22	2,627	1.92
208	Bhagabanpur	86.61	Ardhendu Maity	AITC	57,233	49.82	Prasanta Pradhan	CPM	55,563	48.37	1,670	1.45
209	Khajuri (SC)	86.03	Sunirmal Paik	WBSP	63,311	54.68	Ramchandra Mandal	AITC	46,497	40.16	16,814	14.52
210	Contai North	86.18	Jyotirmoy Kar	AITC	62,769	49.32	Chakradhar Maikap	CPM	62,288	48.95	481	0.37
211	Contai South	79.88	Adhikary Sisir	AITC	62,786	52.63	Sukhendu Maiti	CPI	49,231	41.27	13,555	11.36
212	Ramnagar	83.02	Akhil Giri	AITC	71,079	50.73	Samares Das	CPM	64,528	46.06	6,551	4.67
213	Egra	84.44	Sinha Probodh Chandra	IND	63,032	49.21	Tapan Kanti Kar	AITC	59,515	46.46	3,517	2.75
214	Mugberia	90.49	Kiranmay Nanda	WBSP	64,415	50.58	Adhikari Suvendu	AITC	59,724	46.90	4,691	3.68
215	Pataspur	88.61	Kamakhya Dasmahapatra	CPI	69,069	50.92	Mrinal Kanti Das	AITC	60,011	44.24	9,058	6.68
216	Sabang	91.15	Tushar Kanti Laya	CPM	62,611	51.15	Manas Ranjan Bhunia	INC	56,354	46.04	6,257	5.11
217	Pingla	80.81	Ramapada Samanta	IND	77,342	67.88	Raj Kumar Das	AITC	29,772	26.13	47,570	41.75
218	Debra	88.01	Sk. Jahangir Karim	CPM	66,489	51.37	Radha Kanta Maiti	AITC	57,969	44.79	8,520	6.58
219	Keshtpur (SC)	85.53	Nanda Rani Dal	CPM	120,566	90.64	Rajani Kanta Doloi	AITC	12,454	9.36	108,112	81.28
220	Garhbeta East	86.05	Susanta Ghosh	CPM	96,740	78.25	Md. Rafique	AITC	21,329	17.25	75,411	61.00
221	Garhbeta West (SC)	86.35	Krishna Prasad Duley	CPM	92,856	73.47	Kalipada Duley	BJP	17,717	14.02	75,139	59.45
222	Salboni	83.22	Khagendra Nath	CPM	62,601	55.31	Dinen Roy	AITC	39,146	34.59	23,455	20.72
223	Midnapore	75.29	Purnendu Sengupta	CPI	71,188	49.17	Gouri Ghosh	AITC	63,233	43.68	7,955	5.49
224	Kharagpur Town	53.60	Gyan Singh Sohanpal	INC	36,987	46.85	Lalji Pandey	CPM	24,923	31.57	12,064	15.28
225	Kharagpur Rural	74.85	Nazmul Haque	CPM	66,874	52.51	Ajit Kr. Maity	AITC	44,850	35.22	22,024	17.29
226	Keshiari (ST)	82.51	Maheswar Murmu	CPM	76,278	60.85	Shyam Mandi	AITC	35,231	28.11	41,047	32.74
227	Narayangarh	84.54	Surjya Kanta Mishra	CPM	75,612	54.19	Salil Pattanayak	AITC	48,699	34.90	26,913	19.29
228	Dantan	79.79	Nandagopal Bhattacharya	CPI	71,472	57.24	Bikram Pradhan	AITC	39,690	31.79	31,782	25.45
229	Nayagram (ST)	76.82	Bhutnath Saren	CPM	56,753	56.56	Mangal Hansda	JMM	43,587	43.44	13,166	13.12
230	Gopiballavpur	78.73	Bhabani Hatial	CPM	67,738	60.23	Samay Mandi	AITC	28,618	25.45	39,120	34.78
231	Jhargram	73.42	Mina Sanatani	CPM	57,537	45.66	Bangal Makhan Lal	AITC	29,819	23.66	27,718	22.00
232	Binpur (ST)	70.66	Sambhu Nath Mandi	CPM	47,132	47.07	Chunibala Hansda	IND	37,680	37.63	9,452	9.44
233	Banduan (ST)	66.13	Upendranath Hansda	CPM	48,299	54.85	Birsing Murmu	JMM	32,403	36.80	15,896	18.05
234	Manbazar	72.54	Mahata Shamyapyari	CPM	54,162	50.49	Sitaram Mahato	AITC	47,678	44.45	6,484	6.04
235	Balrampur (ST)	67.45	Bhandu Majhi	CPM	51,968	58.76	Lambodar Mandi	AITC	24,963	28.23	27,005	30.53
236	Arsa	63.17	Nishikanta Mehta	AIFB	45,985	49.26	Ajit Prasad Mahata	JMM	31,544	33.79	14,441	15.47
237	Jhalda	66.67	Nepal Mahato	IND	48,568	49.21	Satya Ranjan Mahato	AIFB	35,091	35.55	13,477	13.66
238	Jaipur	67.42	Shanti Ram Mahato	INC	48,210	47.32	Bindeswar Mahato	AIFB	47,353	46.48	857	0.84
239	Purulia	68.12	Nikhil Mukherjee	CPM	57,124	48.78	Kamakshya Prasad	AITC	51,615	44.07	5,509	4.71
240	Para (SC)	66.45	Bilasibala Sahis	CPM	61,077	57.58	Mira Bauri	AITC	35,085	33.07	25,992	24.51
241	Raghunathpur (SC)	65.42	Uma Rani Bouri	CPM	45,912	51.71	Magaram Bouri	AITC	32,684	36.81	13,228	14.90
242	Kashipur (ST)	68.04	Rabindranath Hembram	CPM	48,632	53.36	Buddheswar Saren	AITC	32,160	35.28	16,472	18.08
243	Hura	69.90	Abinas Mahata	CPM	50,734	50.61	Bikash Chandra Mahato	AITC	34,345	34.26	16,389	16.35
244	Taldangra	79.96	Monoranjan Patra	CPM	78,703	61.27	Dilip Panda	AITC	38,964	30.34	39,739	30.93
245	Raipur (ST)	74.36	Upen Kisku	CPM	66,973	56.38	Kshetra Mohan Hansda	IND	30,217	25.44	36,756	30.94
246	Ranibandh (ST)	64.91	Makar Tudu	CPM	54,186	57.77	Gopinath Saren	JMM	19,445	20.73	34,741	37.04
247	Indpur (SC)	67.98	Kiriti Bagdi	CPI	60,265	60.11	Madan Bouri	AITC	26,963	26.89	33,302	33.22
248	Chhatna	64.41	Subhas Goswami	RSP	44,952	47.65	Swapan Mondal	AITC	29,467	31.24	15,485	16.41
249	Gangajalghati (SC)	69.70	Bauri Ramcharan	CPM	58,864	55.05	Swapan Bouri	AITC	36,754	34.37	22,110	20.68
250	Barjora	75.87	Susmita Biswas	CPM	64,647	51.00	Sudhanghshu Sekhar	AITC	54,826	43.25	9,821	7.75
251	Bankura	70.75	Kashinath Misra	AITC	58,809	47.13	Partha De	CPM	56,496	45.28	2,313	1.85
252	Onda	73.69	Anil Mukherjee	AIFB	74,256	60.11	Sk. Sajahan	INC	42,850	34.69	31,406	25.42
253	Vishnupur	77.77	Jayanta Chowdhury	CPM	65,198	55.28	Subhasish Batabyal	AITC	38,604	32.73	26,594	22.55
254	Kotulpur	84.59	Ghose Manasi	CPM	94,207	68.51	Das Sunil	AITC	34,377	25.00	59,830	43.51
255	Indas (SC)	82.64	Nanda Dulal Majhi	CPM	78,213	62.30	Purnima Lohar	AITC	37,226	29.65	40,987	32.65
256	Sonamukhi (SC)	80.74	Khan Sukhendu	CPM	63,702	54.02	Dipali Saha	AITC	44,751	37.95	18,951	16.07
257	Kulti	51.72	Acharya Maniklal	AIFB	44,296	46.65	Suhrid Basumallick	AITC	41,826	44.05	2,470	2.60
258	Barabani	61.72	Manik Upadhyay	AITC	51,986	46.76	Rudranath Mukherjee	CPM	47,252	42.50	4,734	4.26
259	Hirapur	58.13	Malay Ghatak	AITC	43,226	46.53	Dilip Ghosh	IND	20,692	22.27	22,534	24.26
260	Asansol	57.84	Kalyan Banerjee	AITC	51,420	47.60	Goutam Roychoudhury	CPM	49,207	45.55	2,213	2.05
261	Raniganj	69.07	Bansa Gopal	CPM	84,264	72.72	Sampa Sarkar	INC	21,688	18.72	62,576	54.00
262	Jamuria	65.67	Pelab Kabi	CPM	79,581	70.88	Shiudashan Nayar	AITC	24,209	21.56	55,372	49.32
263	Ukhra (SC)	56.79	Madan Bauri	CPM	73,186	52.14	Nirmal Maji	AITC	57,553	41.00	15,633	11.14
264	Durgapur-I	63.67	Mrinal Banerjee	CPM	53,220	51.04	Chandra Banerjee	INC	43,294	41.52	9,926	9.52
265	Durgapur-II	70.65	Apurba Mukherjee	AITC	93,840	49.48	Debabrata Banerjee	CPM	84,361	44.48	9,479	5.00
266	Kanksa (SC)	75.57	Ankure Saresh	CPM	74,880	59.97	Himangshu Mondal	INC	36,478	29.21	38,402	30.76
267	Ausgram (SC)	78.42	Kartick Chandra Bag	CPM	81,640	64.53	Sukumar Mondal	AITC	35,988	28.45	45,652	36.08
268	Bhatar	80.06	Subhas Mandal	CPM	66,902	52.30	Hazra Banamali	AITC	49,823	38.95	17,079	13.35
269	Galsi	79.03	Mehbub Mondal	AIFB	73,484	60.82	Ajijul Haque Mondal	INC	41,491	34.34	31,993	26.48
270	Burdwan North	80.55	Adhikary Nisith	CPM	95,862	62.54	Lakshmi Narayan Nayek	INC	45,059	29.40	50,803	33.14
271	Burdwan South	81.14	Nirupam Sen	CPM	92,358	53.35	Paresh Chandra Sarkar	AITC	68,031	39.30	24,327	14.05
272	Khandaghosh (SC)	82.37	Jyotsna Singh	CPM	81,195	65.43	Banshi Badan Roy	AITC	35,542	28.64	45,653	36.79
273	Raina	80.66	Shyama Prosad Pal	CPM	78,297	61.13	Arup Kumar Das	AITC	38,753	30.25	39,544	30.88
274	Jamalpur (SC)	82.82	Samar Hazra	CPM	84,408	58.92	Ajay Pramanick	AITC	56,032	39.12	28,376	19.80
275	Memari	82.61	Chattopadhdyay Tapas	CPM	89,769	56.13	Sy. Mustaque Murshed	AITC	57,332	35.85	32,437	20.28
276	Kalna	87.48	Anju Kar	CPM	79,401	54.29	Banerjee Sridhar	AITC	54,448	37.23	24,953	17.06
277	Nadanghat	86.03	Ratan Das	CPM	69,817	43.69	Swapan Debnath	AITC	67,619	42.32	2,198	1.37
278	Manteswar	78.20	Abu Ayes Mondal	CPM	64,896	52.49	Narayan Hazra	AITC	47,998	38.82	16,898	13.67
279	Purbasthali	79.76	Subrata Bhowal	CPM	63,026	47.52	Ansar Mondal	AITC	48,281	36.40	14,745	11.12
280	Katwa	80.31	Rabindranath Chatterjee	INC	77,952	53.48	Kanak Kanti Goswami	CPM	61,133	41.94	16,819	11.54
281	Mangalkot	76.08	Sadhana Mallik	CPM	62,235	53.21	Chandranath Mukherjee	AITC	48,022	41.06	14,213	12.15
282	Ketugram (SC)	78.83	Tamal Chandra Majhi	CPM	63,710	51.34	Amar Ram	INC	50,061	40.34	13,649	11.00
283	Nanur (SC)	78.50	Anand Gopal Das	CPM	65,520	54.07	Krishnagopal Majhi	AITC	52,073	42.97	13,447	11.10
284	Bolpur	78.34	Tapan Hore	RSP	64,635	53.27	Sushovan Banerjee	AITC	49,202	40.55	15,433	12.72
285	Labhpur	77.03	Nabanita Mukherjee	CPM	59,011	54.53	Arup Kumar Misra	AITC	40,306	37.24	18,705	17.29
286	Dubrajpur	76.67	Bhakti Pada Ghosh	AIFB	71,306	59.85	Sattick Roy	AITC	38,361	32.20	32,945	27.65
287	Rajnagar (SC)	66.72	Bijoy Bagdi	AIFB	53,898	54.85	Ashima Dhibar	AITC	32,299	32.87	21,599	21.98
288	Suri	75.34	Braja Mukherjee	CPM	60,860	46.00	Suniti Chattaraj	AITC	59,408	44.90	1,452	1.10
289	Mahammad Bazar	70.89	Dhiren Sen	CPM	57,607	51.52	Sailen Mahata	AITC	40,794	36.48	16,813	15.04
290	Mayureswar (SC)	74.32	Bishnu Let	CPM	54,116	52.66	Kestopada Bagdi	AITC	26,630	25.91	27,486	26.75
291	Rampurhat	75.46	Asish Banerjee	AITC	58,674	50.37	Md. Hannan	AIFB	47,717	40.97	10,957	9.40
292	Hansan (SC)	78.98	Asit Kumar Mal	INC	55,621	52.55	Mihir Bain	RCPI	41,858	39.54	13,763	13.01
293	Nalhati	74.70	Kalimuddin Shams	AIFB	49,076	47.41	Sarif Hossain	INC	45,942	44.38	3,134	3.03
294	Murarai	79.70	Qamre Elahi	CPM	52,186	46.63	Motahar Hossain	AITC	50,205	44.86	1,981	1.77
