= Madan Bauri =

Madan Bauri may refer to:

- Madan Bauri (minister) (c. 1936–2015), Indian politician
- Madan Bauri (MLA), Indian politician
