= Fazlul Karim (politician) =

West Bengal politician

Janab Fazlul Karim
- ফজলুল করীম

Member of West Bengal Legislative Assembly
- In office 2006–2011
- Preceded by: Sudhan Raha
- Succeeded by: Constituency abolished
- Constituency: Kranti

Personal details
- Born: 1937 (age 88–89) Kranti, Jalpaiguri district, Bengal Presidency
- Party: Communist Party of India (Marxist)

Fazlul Karim (Bengali: ফজলুল করীম) is a Communist Party of India (Marxist) politician. He was the final MLA of Kranti Assembly constituency in the West Bengal Legislative Assembly.

== Early life and education ==
Karim was born in c. 1937 to a Bengali Muslim family in Kranti, Jalpaiguri district, then part of the Bengal Presidency. He is the son of Mohammad Hussan.

== Career ==
Karim successfully contested in the 2006 West Bengal Legislative Assembly election where he ran as a Communist Party of India (Marxist) candidate for the Kranti Assembly constituency.
