= Krishnagar East Assembly constituency =

Former West Bengal legislative assembly constituency

The Krishnanagar East Assembly constituency was located in the Nadia district in the Indian state of West Bengal.

== Members of Legislative Assembly ==
Year	Name	Party
1967	Kashi Kanta Maitra	Samyukta Socialist Party
1969	Kashi Kanta Maitra	Samyukta Socialist Party
1971	Kashi Kanta Maitra	Independent politician
1972	Kashi Kanta Maitra	Indian National Congress
1977	Kashi Kanta Maitra	Janata Party
1982	Sadhan Chattopadhyay	Communist Party of India (Marxist)
1987	Sadhan Chattopadhyay	Communist Party of India (Marxist)
1991	Shibdas Mukherjee	Indian National Congress
1996	Shibdas Mukherjee	Indian National Congress
2001	Shibdas Mukherjee	All India Trinamool Congress
2006	Subinay Ghosh	Communist Party of India (Marxist)

== Election History ==
In the 2006 state assembly elections, Subinay Ghosh of CPI(M) won the Krishnagar East assembly seat defeating his nearest rival Dr. Ramendranath Sarkar of Trinamool Congress. Contests in most years were multi cornered but only winners and runners are being mentioned. Shibdas Mukherjee, representing Trinamool Congress in 2001 and Congress in 1996 and 1991, defeated Radhanath Biswas of CPI(M) in 2001 and 1996, and Sadhan Chattopadhyay of CPI(M) in 1991. Sadhan Chattopadhyay of CPI(M) defeated Shibdas Mukherjee of Congress in 1987. Sadhan Chattopadhyay of CPI(M) defeated Kashikanta Maitra of Janata Party in 1982. Kashikanta Maitra of Janata Party defeated Sadhan Chattopadhyay of CPI(M) in 1977.

Kashi Kanta Maitra representing Congress won in 1972, contesting as an independent candidate won in 1971, and representing SSP won in 1969 and 1967.
