= Ukhra Assembly constituency =

Coordinates: 23°39′18″N 87°14′35″E

Ukhra
- Former constituency No. 263 for the West Bengal Legislative Assembly

Constituency details
- Country: India
- Region: East India
- State: West Bengal
- District: Paschim Bardhaman
- Lok Sabha constituency: Asansol
- Established: 1964
- Abolished: 2008
- Reservation: SC

Ukhra was an assembly constituency in Paschim Bardhaman district in the Indian state of West Bengal. It was reserved for scheduled castes.

== Overview ==
As per orders of the Delimitation Commission, Ukhra Assembly constituency ceased to exist and No. 275 Pandaveswar assembly constituency was created from 2011. It covers Pandabeswar and Faridpur-Durgapur community development blocks. Pandaveswar assembly segment is part of No. 40 Asansol Lok Sabha constituency.

As per orders of the Delimitation Commission, Ukhra Assembly constituency has ceased to be an assembly constituency from 2011. Andal community development block is part of Raniganj, West Bengal Assembly constituency.

== Members of the Legislative Assembly ==
Year	Con. No.	Res.	Member	Party
1967	250	SC	H. Mondal	Indian National Congress
1969	250	SC	Lakhan Bagdi	Communist Party of India (Marxist)
1971	250	SC	Lakhan Bagdi	Communist Party of India (Marxist)
1972	250	SC	Gopal Mondal	Indian National Congress (Requisitionists)
1977	263	SC	Lakhan Bagdi	Communist Party of India (Marxist)
1982	263	SC	Lakhan Bagdi	Communist Party of India (Marxist)
1987	263	SC	Lakhan Bagdi	Communist Party of India (Marxist)
1991	263	SC	Lakhan Bagdi	Communist Party of India (Marxist)
1996	263	SC	Lakhan Bagdi	Communist Party of India (Marxist)
2001	263	SC	Madan Bauri	Communist Party of India (Marxist)
2006	263	SC	Madan Bauri	Communist Party of India (Marxist)

== Election results ==
=== 1977-2006 ===
Madan Bauri of CPI (M) won the Ukhra (SC) assembly seat in 2006 and 2001 defeating his nearest rivals Upender Paswan of JD(U) and Nirmal Maji of Trinamool Congress respectively. Lakhan Bagdi of CPI (M) won the seat in 1996, 1991, 1987, 1982 and 1977, defeating Jethu Ram of Congress in 1996, Gopal Mondal of Congress in 1991, Haradhan Mondal of Congress in 1987 and 1982, and Gopal Mondal of Congress in 1977.

=== 1969-1972 ===
Gopal Mondal of INC won the seat in 1972. Lakhan Bagdi of CPI (M) won the seat in 1971 and 1969. Prior to that the Ukhra constituency was not there.

Ukhra assembly constituency was part of Asansol Lok Sabha constituency.
