= Indrajit Tangi =

Indian politician (c.1944–2019)

West Bengal Legislative Assembly
- In office 2006–2011
- Preceded by: Kiriti Bagdi
- Succeeded by: Constituency Dissolved
- Constituency: Indpur

Personal details
- Born: c. 1944
- Died: 2 November 2019 (aged 75)
- Party: Communist Party of India

Indrajit Tangi (c. 1944 – 2 November 2019) was an Indian teacher and politician belonging to the Communist Party of India. He was a legislator of the West Bengal Legislative Assembly.

== Biography ==
Tangi was a primary school teacher and politician. He was elected as a legislator of the West Bengal Legislative Assembly from Indpur in 2006. He died on 2 November 2019 at the age of 75.
