= Cooch Behar West Assembly constituency =

Cooch Behar West
- Former constituency for the West Bengal Legislative Assembly

Constituency details
- Country: India
- Region: East India
- State: West Bengal
- District: Cooch Behar
- Established: 1967
- Abolished: 2011

Cooch Behar West was an assembly constituency in Cooch Behar district in the Indian state of West Bengal.

== Members of the Legislative Assembly ==
Cooch Behar West
1967	Prasenjit Barman	Indian National Congress
1969	Prasenjit Barman	Indian National Congress
1971	Rajani Das	Indian National Congress
1972	Rajani Das	Indian National Congress
1977	Bimal Kanti Basu	Forward Bloc
1982	Bimal Kanti Basu	Forward Bloc
1987	Bimal Kanti Basu	Forward Bloc
1991	Soumindra Chandra Das	Forward Bloc
1996	Soumindra Chandra Das	Forward Bloc
2001	Akshay Thakur	Forward Bloc
2006	Akshay Thakur	Forward Bloc
