= Bansberia Assembly constituency =

Coordinates: 22.95°N 88.41°E

Bansberia
- Former constituency No. 193 for the West Bengal Legislative Assembly

Constituency details
- Country: India
- Region: East India
- State: West Bengal
- District: Hooghly
- Lok Sabha constituency: Hooghly
- Established: 1977
- Abolished: 2011
- Reservation: None

Bansberia Assembly constituency was an assembly constituency in Hooghly district in the Indian state of West Bengal.

== Overview ==
As a consequence of the orders of the Delimitation Commission Bansh Baria (Vidhan Sabha constituency) ceased to exist from 2011 and a new constituency Saptagram Assembly constituency came into being.

== Members of the Legislative Assembly ==
Election Year	Constituency	Name of M.L.A.	Party affiliation
1977	Bansberia	Prabir Sengupta	Communist Party of India (Marxist)
1982		Prabir Sengupta	Communist Party of India (Marxist)
1987		Prabir Sengupta	Communist Party of India (Marxist)
1991		Prabir Sengpta	Communist Party of India (Marxist)
1996		Robin Mukherjee	Indian National Congress
2001		Asutosh Mukhopadhyay	Communist Party of India (Marxist)
2006		Asutosh Mukhopadhyay	Communist Party of India (Marxist)

== Election results ==
=== 1977-2006 ===
In 2006 and 2001 state assembly elections Asutosh Mukhopadhyay of CPI(M) won the 187 Bansberia assembly seat defeating his nearest rivals Suma Mukherjee and Tapan Dasgupta, both of Trinamool Congress in respective years. Robin Mukherjee of Congress defeated Prabir Sengupta of CPI(M) in 1996. Prabir Sengupta of CPI(M) defeated Robin Mukherjee of Congress in 1991 and 1987, Shibani Maitra of Congress in 1982 and Sanat Majumdar of Janata Party in 1977.
