= Madan Bauri (Paschim Bardhaman politician) =

Indian politician

MLA of Ukhra
- In office 2001–2011
- Preceded by: Lakhan Bagdi
- Succeeded by: Constituency Dissolved

Personal details
- Party: All India Trinamool Congress

Madan Bauri is an Indian politician belonging to All India Trinamool Congress. He was elected as a member of West Bengal Legislative Assembly from Malatipur in 2001 and 2006. He joined All India Trinamool Congress from Communist Party of India (Marxist) on 4 April 2018.
