= Belgachia West Assembly constituency =

Former Legislative Assembly constituency in West Bengal, India

Coordinates: 22°36′11″N 88°23′24″E

Belgachia West
- Former constituency No. 160 for the West Bengal Legislative Assembly

Constituency details
- Country: India
- Region: East India
- State: West Bengal
- District: Kolkata
- Lok Sabha constituency: Calcutta North East
- Established: 1951
- Abolished: 2011
- Reservation: None

Belgachia West Assembly constituency was a Legislative Assembly constituency of Kolkata district in the Indian state of West Bengal.

== Overview ==
As a consequence of the orders of the Delimitation Commission, Belgachia West Assembly constituency ceases to exist from 2011.

It was part of Calcutta North East (Lok Sabha constituency).

== Members of the Legislative Assembly ==
Election Year	Constituency	Name of M.L.A.	Party affiliation
1951	Belgachia	Ganesh Ghosh	Communist Party of India
1957		Ganesh Ghosh	Communist Party of India
1962		Ganesh Ghosh	Communist Party of India
1967		Lakshmi Charan Sen	Communist Party of India (Marxist)
1969		Lakshmi Charan Sen	Communist Party of India (Marxist)
1971		Lakshmi Charan Sen	Communist Party of India (Marxist)
1972		Ganapati Sur	Indian National Congress
1977	Belgachia West	Lakshmi Charan Sen	Communist Party of India (Marxist)
1982		Rathindra Nath Roy	Communist Party of India (Marxist)
1987		Sudipto Roy	Indian National Congress
1991		Rajdeo Goala	Communist Party of India (Marxist)
1996		Rajdeo Goala	Communist Party of India (Marxist)
2001		Rajdeo Goala	Communist Party of India (Marxist)
2006		Mala Saha	All India Trinamool Congress

== Results ==
=== 1977-2009 Belgachia West ===
In the 2006 state assembly elections, Mala Saha of Trinamool Congress won the Belgachia West assembly seat defeating her nearest rival Rajdeo Goala of CPI(M). In 2001, 1996 and 1991, Rajdeo Goala of CPI(M) defeated Dr. Sudipta Roy of Trinamool Congress, Sadhan Das of Congress and Sudipto Roy of Congress respectively. Sudipto Roy of Congress won the seat in 1987 defeating Lakshmi Charan Sen of CPI(M). In 1982, Rathindra Nath Roy of CPI(M) defeated Amarendra Nath Bhattacharya of Congress. In 1977, Lakshmi Charan Sen of CPI(M) defeated Bhupendra Nath Sengupta of Congress.

=== 1951-1972 Belgachia ===
During the period there was only one seat for Belgachia. Ganapati Sur of Congress defeated Lakshmi Charan Sen of CPI(M) in 1972. Lakshmi Charan Sen of CPI(M) defeated Ganapati Sur of Congress in 1971, Suchit Kumar Sur of Congress in 1969 and Ganapati Sur of Congress in 1967. Ganesh Ghosh of CPI won the seat defeating Ganapati Sur of Congress in 1962, Nandalal Banerjee of Congress in 1957 and in independent India's first election in 1951 defeating Sudhir Kumar De of Congress.
