= Bishnupur Assembly constituency =

Bishnupur Assembly constituency may refer to:

- Bishnupur, Manipur Assembly constituency
- Bishnupur, Bankura Assembly constituency in West Bengal
- Bishnupur, South 24 Parganas Assembly constituency in West Bengal
