= Araidanga Assembly constituency =

Former West Bengal Legislative Assembly constituency

Coordinates: 25.12°N 87.99°E

Araidanga
- Former constituency No. 44 for the West Bengal Legislative Assembly

Constituency details
- Country: India
- Region: East India
- State: West Bengal
- District: Malda
- Lok Sabha constituency: Malda
- Established: 1977
- Abolished: 2011
- Reservation: None

Araidanga Assembly constituency was an assembly constituency in Malda district in the Indian state of West Bengal.

== Overview ==
As a consequence of the orders of the Delimitation Commission, Kharba Assembly constituency and Araidanga Assembly constituency cease to exist from 2011. There are two new constituencies in the area – Chanchal Assembly constituency and Malatipur Assembly constituency. Araidnaga is now part of Ratua Assembly constituency.

Araidanga Assembly constituency was part of Malda (Lok Sabha constituency)

== Members of the Legislative Assembly ==
Election Year	Constituency	Name of M.L.A.	Party affiliation
1977	Araidanga	Habib Mustafa	Communist Party of India (Marxist)
1982		Habib Mustafa	Communist Party of India (Marxist)
1987		Habib Mustafa	Communist Party of India (Marxist)
1991		Sabitri Mitra	Indian National Congress
1996		Sabitri Mitra	Indian National Congress
2001		Sabitri Mitra	Indian National Congress
2006		Sabitri Mitra	Indian National Congress

== Election results ==
=== 1977–2006 ===
In the 2006, 2001, 1996 and 1991 state assembly elections, Sabitri Mitra of Congress won the Araidanga assembly seat defeating her nearest rivals Sadiqul Islam of CPI(M) in 2006, Setara Begum of CPI(M) in 2001 and 1996, and Habib Mustafa of CPI(M) in 1991. Contests in most years were multi cornered but only winners and runners are being mentioned. Habib Mustafa of CPI(M) defeated Abdul Hannan of Congress in 1987, Sajjad Ahmed of Congress in 1982 and Md. Gofurur Rahaman of Congress in 1977. Prior to that the Araidanga seat did not exist.
