= Sanchayita chit fund scam =

Financial scam in West Bengal, India in the 1980's

Sanchayita Chit Fund Scam was a major financial scam caused by the collapse of a Ponzi scheme. The scam was unearthed in 1980 and it affected over 1.31 lakh (0.131 million) people in West Bengal, India. Two main promoters of the Sanchayita group, Shambhu Prasad Mukherjee and Swapan Guha, were arrested. Shambhu Mukherjee leaped or was pushed to his death from a multi-storeyed building in Calcutta (the murder theory still holds sway in Calcutta although the police claim that he committed suicide). Swapan Guha was declared insolvent by the court. Another accused Bihari Lal Murarka, the third promoter, went underground and has not been traced since.
