= Vidyasagar Assembly constituency =

Former West Bengal Legislative Assembly constituency

Coordinates: 22°34′52″N 88°22′23″E

Vidyasagar
- Former constituency No. 157 for the West Bengal Legislative Assembly

Constituency details
- Country: India
- Region: East India
- State: West Bengal
- District: Kolkata
- Lok Sabha constituency: Calcutta North East
- Established: 1951
- Abolished: 2011
- Reservation: None

Vidyasagar Assembly constituency was a Legislative Assembly constituency of Kolkata district in the Indian state of West Bengal.

== Overview ==
As a consequence of the orders of the Delimitation Commission, VidyaSagar, West Bengal Assembly constituency ceases to exist from 2011.

It was part of Calcutta North East (Lok Sabha constituency).

== Members of the Legislative Assembly ==
Election Year	Constituency	Name of M.L.A.	Party affiliation
1951	Vidyasagar	Narayan Chandra Roy	Independent
1957		Narayan Chandra Roy	Communist Party of India
1962		Narayan Chandra Roy	Communist Party of India
1967		Narayan Chandra Roy	Communist Party of India (Marxist)
1969		Samar Kumar Rudra	Communist Party of India (Marxist)
1971		Md. Shamsuzzoha	Indian National Congress
1972		Md. Shamsuzzoha	Indian National Congress
1977		Samar Kumar Rudra	Communist Party of India (Marxist)
1982		Lakshmi Kanta Dey	Communist Party of India (Marxist)
1987		Lakshmi Kanta Dey	Communist Party of India (Marxist)
1991		Lakshmi Kanta Dey	Communist Party of India (Marxist)
1996		Tapas Roy	Indian National Congress
2001		Lakshmi Kanta Dey	Communist Party of India (Marxist)
2003 by-election		Anadi Kumar Sahu	Communist Party of India (Marxist)
2006		Anadi Kumar Sahu	Communist Party of India (Marxist)

== Results ==
=== 2006 ===
West Bengal assembly elections, 2006: Vidyasagar
Party	Candidate	Votes	%	±%
CPI(M)	Anadi Kumar Sahoo	28,992	49.70	
INC	Priyal Chowdhury	14,416	24.70	
AITC	Debabrata Biswas	13,490	23.10	
Independent	Suresh Das	558	1.0	
Independent	Ajit Ghosh	203	0.4	
Independent	Sanjib Pandit	161	0.3	
Independent	Sajan Biswas	150	0.3	
Independent	Ajoy Kumar Biswas	128	0.2	
Independent	Samir Sahrma	126	0.2	
Independent	Kanailal Sharma	119	0.2	
Majority		14,576	(25.0)	
Turnout		58,347	(59.6%)	
CPI(M) hold		Swing	10.65#	

.# Swing calculated on Trinamool Congress+BJP vote percentages taken together in 2006.

=== 1977–2006 ===
In the 2006 state assembly elections, Anadi Kumar Sahu of CPI(M) won the 157 Vidyasagar assembly seat defeating his nearest rival Pryal Chaudhury of Congress. Lakshmi Kanta Dey of CPI(M) defeated Mahua Mondal of Trinamool Congress in 2001. Tapas Roy of Congress defeated Dr Abir Lal Mukherjee of CPI(M) in 1996. Lakshmi Kanta Dey of CPI(M) defeated Tapas Roy of Congress in 1991, Samir Chakraborty of Congress in 1987, and Biren Mahanti of Congress in 1982. Samar Kumar Rudra of CPI(M) defeated Tapan Kumar Sikdar of Janata Party in 1977.

=== 1951–1972 ===
Md. Shamsuzzoha of Congress won in 1972 and 1971 defeating Samar Kumar Rudra of CPI(M) in both the years. Samar Kumar Rudra of CPI(M) won in 1969 defeating Mrinal Kanti Rudra of Congress. Narayan Chandra Roy representing CPI(M) won in 1967 defeating D.L.Dutt of Congress. Narayan Chandra Roy representing CPI won in 1962 defeating B.Halder of Congress and 1957 defeating Shankar Prasad Mitra of Congress. In independent India’s first election Narayan Chandra Roy, contesting as an Independent candidate won the Vidyasagar assembly seat defeating Nalin Chandra Pal of Congress.
