= Madan Bauri (Bankura politician) =

Indian politician

Civil Defence State Minister of West Bengal Government
- In office 1992–1995

MLA of Indpur
- In office 1982–1996
- Preceded by: Binode Behari Maji
- Succeeded by: Kiriti Bagdi

Personal details
- Born: 1936/37
- Died: 16 September 2015
- Party: All India Trinamool Congress

Madan Bauri was an Indian politician belonging to All India Trinamool Congress. He was elected as a member of West Bengal Legislative Assembly from Indpur in 1982, 1987 and 1991. He also served as Civil Defence State Minister of West Bengal Government from 1992 to 1995. He joined All India Trinamool Congress in 2001. He died on 16 September 2015 at the age of 78.
