= Polba Assembly constituency =

Coordinates: 22.96°N 88.31°E

Polba
- Former constituency No. 190 for the West Bengal Legislative Assembly

Constituency details
- Country: India
- Region: East India
- State: West Bengal
- District: Hooghly
- Lok Sabha constituency: Hooghly
- Established: 1967
- Abolished: 2011
- Reservation: None

Polba Assembly constituency was an assembly constituency in Hooghly district in the Indian state of West Bengal.

== Overview ==
As a consequence of the orders of the Delimitation Committee Polba Assembly constituency ceased to exist from 2011.

== Members of the Legislative Assembly ==
Election Year	Constituency	Name of M.L.A.	Party affiliation
1967	Polba	B.Chattopadhyay	Indian National Congress
1969		Braja Gopal Neogy	Communist Party of India (Marxist)
1971		Braja Gopal Neogy	Communist Party of India (Marxist)
1972		Bhawani Prasad Sinha Roy	Indian National Congress
1977		Braja Gopal Neogy	Communist Party of India (Marxist)
1982		Braja Gopal Neogy	Communist Party of India (Marxist)
1987		Braja Gopal Neogy	Communist Party of India (Marxist)
1991		Braja Gopal Neogy	Communist Party of India (Marxist)
1996		Shakti Pada Khanra	Communist Party of India (Marxist)
2001		Shakti Pada Khanra	Communist Party of India (Marxist)
2006		Shakti Pada Khanra	Communist Party of India (Marxist)

== Election results ==
=== 1977-2006 ===
In 2006, 2001 and 1996 state assembly elections, Shaktipada Khanra of CPI(M) won the Polba assembly seat defeating Sk. Sahadat Ali of Trinamool Congress in 2006, Azizur Rahman of Trinamool Congress in 2001, and Mainul Haque of Congress in 1996. Brojogopal Neogy of CPI(M) defeated Bhawani Prasad Sinha Roy of Congress in 1991, Tapan Dasgupta of Congress in 1987, Kamal Kumar Mukherjee of Congress in 1982 and Bhabani Prasad Sinha Roy of Congress in 1977.

=== 1967-1972 ===
Bhawani Pd. Sinha Roy of Congress won in 1972. Braja Gopal Neogy of CPI(M) won in 1971 and 1969. B. Chattopadhyay of Congress won in 1967.
