= Kranti Assembly constituency =

Coordinates: 26.71°N 88.72°E

Kranti
- Former constituency No. 19 for the West Bengal Legislative Assembly

Constituency details
- Country: India
- Region: East India
- State: West Bengal
- District: Jalpaiguri
- Lok Sabha constituency: Jalpaiguri
- Established: 1977
- Abolished: 2011
- Reservation: None

Kranti Assembly constituency was an assembly constituency in Jalpaiguri district in the Indian state of West Bengal.

== Overview ==
As a consequence of the order of the Delimitation Commission Kranti Assembly constituency ceases to exist from 2011 and the new Dabgram-Phulbari Assembly constituency comes into being.

== Members of the Legislative Assembly ==
Election Year	Name of MLA	Party Affiliation
1977	Parimal Mitra	Communist Party of India (Marxist)
1982	Parimal Mitra	Communist Party of India (Marxist)
1987	Sudhan Raha	Communist Party of India (Marxist)
1991	Sudhan Raha	Communist Party of India (Marxist)
1996	Sudhan Raha	Communist Party of India (Marxist)
2001	Sudhan Raha	Communist Party of India (Marxist)
2006	Fazlul Karim	Communist Party of India (Marxist)
For MLAs in the area after 2006 see Dabgram-Phulbari Assembly constituency

== Results ==
=== 1977-2006 ===
In the 2006 state assembly elections, Fazlul Karim of CPI(M) won the Kranti assembly seat defeating his nearest rival Atul Roy, Independent. Contests in most years were multi cornered but only winners and runners are being mentioned. Sudhan Raha of CPI(M) defeated Aburabbani Ahmed (Badshah) of Trinamool Congress in 2001, Subhash Das of Congress in 1996, Aftabul Alam of Congress in 1991, and Kallol Basu of Congress in 1987. Parimal Mitra of CPI(M) defeated Deba Prasad Roy of Congress in 1982 and Abdul Hasnat Mohammed Abu Saleque of Congress in 1977. The constituency was not there prior to that.
