= Arsha Assembly constituency =

Former West Bengal Legislative Assembly constituency

Coordinates: 23°16′00″N 86°09′00″E

Arsha
- Former constituency No. 236 for the West Bengal Legislative Assembly

Constituency details
- Country: India
- Region: East India
- State: West Bengal
- District: Purulia
- Lok Sabha constituency: Purulia
- Established: 1957
- Abolished: 2011
- Reservation: None

Arsha Assembly constituency was an assembly constituency in Purulia district in the Indian state of West Bengal.

== Overview ==
As a consequence of the orders of the Delimitation Commission, Arsha Assembly constituency ceased to exist from 2011.

It was part of Purulia (Lok Sabha constituency).

For Members of Legislative Assembly for Arsha Assembly constituency see Joypur, Purulia Assembly constituency

== Election results ==
=== 1977–2006 ===
In the 2006 state assembly elections, Prabhat Mahato of Forward Bloc won the Arsha assembly seat defeating his nearest rival Bibhuti Bhusan Mahato of Congress. Contests in most years were multi cornered but only winners and runners are being mentioned. Nishi Kanta Mehta of Forward Bloc defeated Ajit Prasad Mahata of JMM in 2001, Kamakshya Prasad Singh Deo of Congress in 1996, and Hare Krishna Mahato of Congress in 1991. Kumar Pandab of Forward Bloc defeated K.P.Singh Deo of Congress in 1987. Dhrubeswar Chattopadhyay of Forward Bloc defeated K.P.Singh Deo of Congress in 1982. Daman Chandra Kuiry of Forward Bloc defeated Tilakeswar Majhi of Janata Party in 1977.

=== 1957–72 ===
Nitai Chandra Deshmukh of Congress won in 1972 and 1971. Dahan Chandra Kuiri of Forward Bloc won in 1969. B. Mukherjee of Congress won in 1967. Daman Kuiry of Forward Bloc won in 1962. Sagar Chandra Mahato won in 1957.
