= Indpur Assembly constituency =

Coordinates: 23°10′00″N 86°56′00″E

Indpur
- Former constituency No. 247 for the West Bengal Legislative Assembly

Constituency details
- Country: India
- Region: East India
- State: West Bengal
- District: Bankura
- Lok Sabha constituency: Bishnupur
- Established: 1962
- Abolished: 2011
- Reservation: SC

Indpur was an assembly constituency in Bankura district in the Indian state of West Bengal. It was reserved for scheduled castes.

== Overview ==
As a consequence of the orders of the Delimitation Commission, Indpur Assembly constituency ceases to exist from 2011.

== Election results ==
=== 1977-2006 ===
In the 2006 state assembly elections, Indrajit Tangi of CPI won the Indpur assembly seat defeating his nearest rival Gour Chandra Lohar of BJP. Contests in most years were multi cornered but only winners and runners are being mentioned. Kiriti Bagdi of CPI defeated Madan Bauri of Trinamool Congress in 2001 and Bibekananda Layek of Congress in 1996. Madan Bauri of CPI defeated Shib Shankar Mondal of Congress in 1991, and Binode Behari Maji of Congress in 1987 and 1982. Binode Behari Maji of Janata Party defeated Radha Raman Moi of Biplabi Bangla Congress in 1977.

=== 1962-1972 ===
Gour Chandra Lohar of Congress won in 1972. Prayag Mandal of Biplabi Bangla Congress won in 1971. Gour Lohar of Bangla Congress won in 1969. B.B.Maji of Congress won in 1967. Ashutosh Mallick of Congress won in 1962. Prior to that the Indpur seat did not exist.
