= Rajnagar, West Bengal Assembly constituency =

Coordinates: 23°57′N 87°19′E

Rajnagar
- Former constituency No. 287 for the West Bengal Legislative Assembly

Constituency details
- Country: India
- Region: East India
- State: West Bengal
- District: Birbhum
- Lok Sabha constituency: Birbhum
- Established: 1957
- Abolished: 2011
- Reservation: SC

Rajnagar was an assembly constituency in Birbhum district in the Indian state of West Bengal. It was reserved for scheduled castes.

== Overview ==
As per order of the Delimitation Commission issued in 2006 Rajnagar Assembly constituency ceases to exist from 2011.

Rajnagar is a community development block

== Election results ==
=== 1977–2006 ===
Bijoy Bagdi of the Forward Bloc won the 287 Rajnagar assembly (SC) seat from 1987 to 2006, defeating Sheuli Saha of Trinamool Congress in 2006, Ashima Dhibar of Trinamool Congress in 2001, Asesh Mondal of Congress in 1996, Panchanan Badyakar of BJP in 1991, and Anil Bouri of Congress in 1986. Siddheswar Mondal of Forward Bloc defeated Subhendu Modal of Congress in 1982 and Jiten Kumar Mondal in 1977.

=== 1957–1972 ===
Dwija Pada Saha of Congress won in 1972. Nanda Bauri of CPI(M) won in 1971. Siddheswar Mondal of Forward Bloc won in 1969, 1967 and 1962. In 1957 Rajnagar was a joint seat. It was won by Nishapati Majhi and Khagendranath Bandopadhyay, both of Congress. The Rajnagar seat did not exist in 1951.
