= Kanksa Assembly constituency =

Coordinates: 23.46°N 87.46°E

Kanksa
- Former constituency No. 266 for the West Bengal Legislative Assembly

Constituency details
- Country: India
- Region: East India
- State: West Bengal
- District: Paschim Bardhaman
- Lok Sabha constituency: Durgapur
- Established: 1977
- Abolished: 2011
- Reservation: SC

Kanksa was an assembly constituency in Paschim Bardhaman district in the Indian state of West Bengal. It was reserved for scheduled castes.

== Election results ==
Ankure Saresh of CPI (M) won the Kanksa (SC) assembly seat in 2006, 2001, and 1996 defeating his nearest rivals, Lakshi Narayan Saha of Trinamool Congress in 2006 and Himangshu Mondal of Congress in 2001 and 1996. In 1991 and 1987, Krishna Chandra Halder of CPI (M) defeated Manik Lal Bouri and Samir Kumar Saha, both of Congress in the respective years. In 1982 and 1977, Lakshi Narayan Saha of CPI (M) defeated Shib Narayan Saha and Samir Kumar Saha in the respective years.

Kanksa assembly constituency was part of Durgapur (Lok Sabha constituency).

For Members of Legislative Assembly from Kanksa Assembly constituency, see Galsi Assembly constituency

== Impact of delimitation ==
As per orders of the Delimitation Commission Kanksa Assembly constituency ceased to be an assembly constituency from 2011. Amlajora, Gopalpur and Molandighi gram panchayats of Kanksa community development block are part of 276 Durgapur Purba Assembly constituency. Kanksa, Trilokchandrapur, Bankati and Bidbehar gram panchayats of Kanksa CD Block are part of Galsi Assembly constituency.
