= Mahammad Bazar Assembly constituency =

Coordinates: 23°59′N 87°34′E

Mahammad Bazar
- Former constituency No. 289 for the West Bengal Legislative Assembly

Constituency details
- Country: India
- Region: East India
- State: West Bengal
- District: Birbhum
- Lok Sabha constituency: Birbhum
- Established: 1962
- Abolished: 2011
- Reservation: None

Mahammad Bazar Assembly constituency was an assembly constituency in Birbhum district in the Indian state of West Bengal.

== Overview ==
As per order of the Delimitation Commission issued in 2006 Mahammad Bazar Assembly constituency ceases to exist from 2011. Sainthia Assembly constituency is a new constituency in the area.

== Election results ==
=== 1977–2006 ===
In the 2006 state assembly elections, Dhiren Bagdi of CPI(M) won the 289 Mahammad Bazar assembly seat defeating his nearest rival Biswajit Mukherjee of Congress. Dhiren Sen of CPI(M) defeated Sailen Mahata of Trinamool Congress in 2001, Rajaram Ghosh of Congress in 1996, Nirmal Chandra Mondal of BJP in 1991, Tapan Mukherjee of Congress in 1987, Sunil Das of Congress in 1982 and Nitai Pada Ghosh of Congress in 1977.

=== 1962–1972 ===
Nitai Pada Ghosh of Congress won in 1972. Dhiren Sen of CPI(M) won in 1971. Dwarika Prasonna Roy of Bangla Congress won in 1969. N.Ghosh of Congress won in 1967. In 1962 the Mahammad Bazar seat was reserved for scheduled tribes. It was won by Bhusan Hansdah of Congress. Prior to that the seat did not exist.
