= 1996 West Bengal Legislative Assembly election =

Elections in state of India

- 13 May 1996

All 294 seats in the West Bengal Legislative Assembly 148 seats needed for a majority
- Turnout: 82.94% (▲6.14 pp)
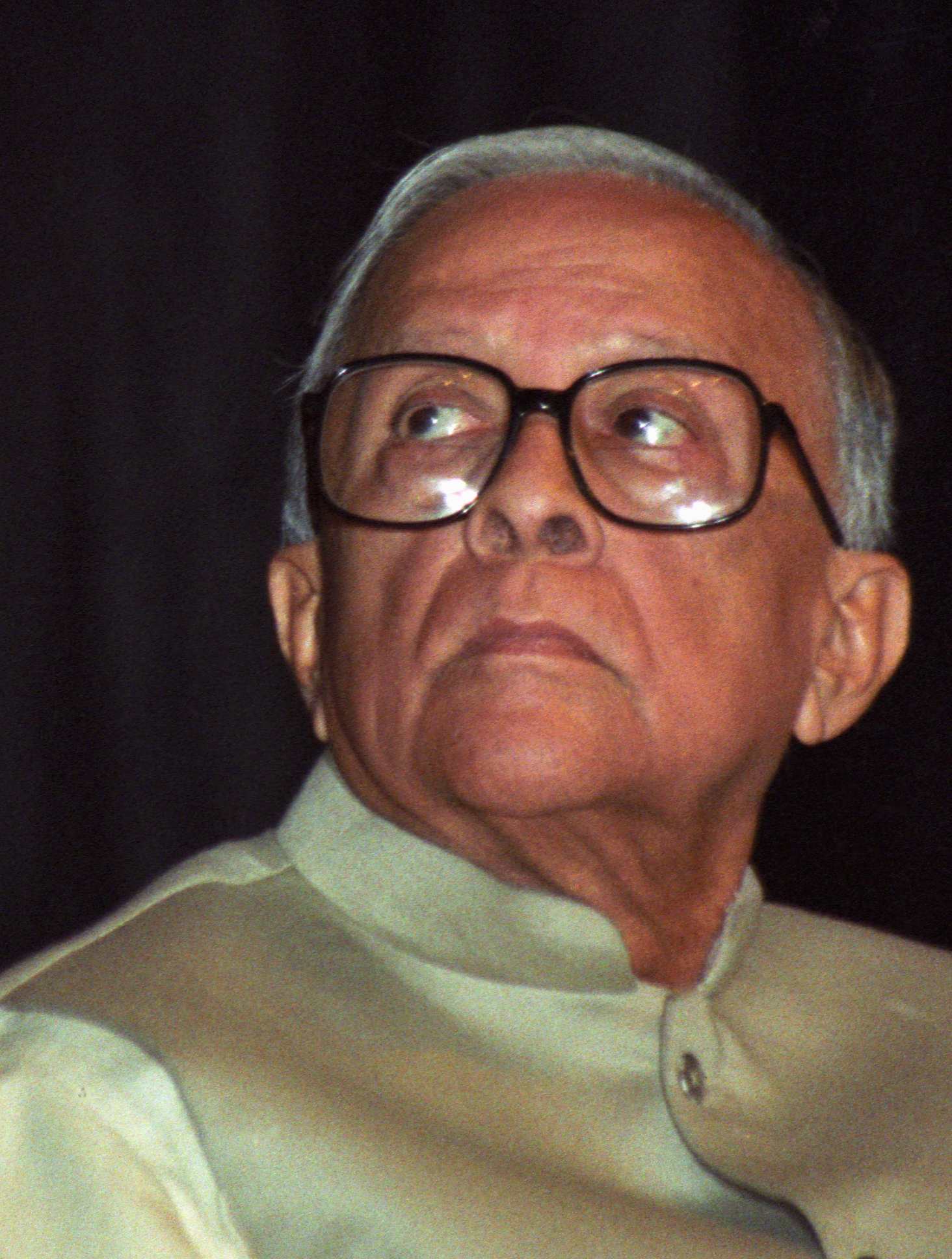

	Majority party	Minority party
Leader	Jyoti Basu	Somen Mitra
Party	CPI(M)	INC(I)
Alliance	LF	INC+GNLF
Leader's seat	Satgachhia	Sealdah
Last election	36.87%, 182 seats	35.12%, 43 seats
Seats won	153	82
Seat change	▼29	▲39
Popular vote	13,670,198	14,523,964
Percentage	37.16%	39.48%
Swing	▲1.05 pp	▲4.36 pp
Alliance seats	203	85
Seat change	▼42	▲39
- Seatwise Result Map of the election

- Alliance wise Result
Chief Minister before election
Jyoti Basu
CPI(M)
Chief Minister after election
Jyoti Basu
CPI(M)

Legislative Assembly elections were held in the Indian state of West Bengal in 1996. The election took place simultaneously with the 1996 Indian general election. This was the last election Jyoti Basu contested, as he retired from politics in 2000.

== Parties ==
=== Left Front ===
The Communist Party of India (Marxist) had fielded 70 new candidates, but many of them failed to get elected. The All India Forward Bloc had suffered a split before the election, with the emergence of the Forward Bloc (Socialist).

The Left Front supported Janata Dal candidates in five constituencies.

=== Indian National Congress ===
Factionalism was rife within the state Congress unit. After being out of power in the state for about 20 years with no significant increase in either vote-share or number of seats in the last 15 years, most state Congress leaders had given up the hopes of defeating the Left Front & sought to re-evaluate their strategy. The elections took place alongside the general elections, in which there were 4 major players - the Bharatiya Janata Party-led Hindu right wing alliance, the centre-left alliance led by Janata Dal made up of Congress dissidents, the centrist alliance of the Congress party & the leftist alliance of Communist parties, out of which the BJP & JD didn't have much influence in the state. In 1991, the Congress under P. V. Narasimha Rao was able to form a minority government with the support of the Janata Dal, however Rao's tenure saw the Congress rife with defection of some of its senior leaders & charges of corruption. The political climate of India was charged with the issue of Ram-mandir, following the demolition of Babri Masjid in 1992. The BJP made the construction of Ram-mandir on the Ram Janmabhoomi site its primary electoral promise while the Janata Dal banked on the implementation of the Mandal Commission report as its main electoral plank in order to counter the BJP, leading to conflict between OBC & SC groups. However, the Mandir-Mandal issue didn't have much impact in the politics of the state which had been under Communist rule since 1977. As the Janata Dal was open to supporting both BJP & Congress, the support of the Left Front became the more important on the national stage. CPI(M) stalwart & the incumbent Chief Minister Jyoti Basu had been even offered the post of Prime Minister by the Congress when the Janata Dal government of V. P. Singh collapsed in 1990 due to BJP's withdrawal of support & again when the Congress withdrew its support from Chandra Shekhar's government in 1991.

In midst of such political instability, 2 factions developed within the state Congress unit. One faction led by Pranab Mukherjee was in favour of forging an electoral understanding with the Left Front in the state in order to gain their support on the national level. The other faction led by anti-Communist leaders like Siddharta Shankar Ray & Priya Ranjan Dasmunsi was stauchly opposed to it. The rivalry between these 2 groups played out in open during the 1992 elections to the post of state PCC president. The pro-Communist faction sided with Mukherjee's protégé, 4-time Sealdah MLA Somen Mitra, while the anti-Communist faction sided with Ray's protégé, state Youth Congress president & South Kolkata MP Mamata Banerjee. Mukherjee played a decisive role in ensuring Mitra's victory in this election by having Banerjee's main supporter Ray sent out of the state as India's ambassador to the US at that time. Somen Mitra's and Mamata Banerjee's factions continued to fight over the choice of candidates to be fielded. Banerjee played an important role in rallying public support for the party & fielding many new faces from the Youth Congress as the party's candidate.

The Congress leader Adhir Ranjan Chowdhury contested the Nabagram seat from jail, being imprisoned on murder charges. His speeches were recorded from prison and played at campaign meetings.

The Indian National Congress and the Jharkhand Mukti Morcha had entered into alliance.

== Seat Allotment ==
=== Left Front ===
Party	Flag	Symbol	Leader	Contesting Seats	
Communist Party of India (Marxist)			Jyoti Basu	210	225
Janata Dal			Vishwanath Pratap Singh	5	225
West Bengal Socialist Party			Kiranmoy Nanda	4	225
Democratic Socialist Party			Prabodh Chandra Sinha	2	225
Marxist Forward Bloc			Pratim Chatterjee	2	225
Revolutionary Communist Party of India			Baneswar Saikia	1	225
Biplobi Bangla Congress				1	225
All India Forward Bloc			Chitta Basu	34	
Revolutionary Socialist Party			Kshiti Goswami	23	
Communist Party of India			Indrajit Gupta	12	
Total				294	

=== Congress Alliance ===
Party	Flag	Symbol	Leader	Contesting Seats
Indian National Congress			Somen Mitra	288
Gorkha National Liberation Front				3
Total				291

=== Bharatiya Janata Party ===
Party	Flag	Symbol	Leader	Contesting Seats
Bharatiya Janata Party			Tapan Sikdar	292
Total				292

== Results ==
The Left Front won the election, entering into government for a fifth consecutive term. Winning 203 out of 294 seats, the 1996 election represented the first major electoral set-back for the Left Front since its foundation. The electoral losses were primarily felt in Calcutta and the industrial areas, and nine incumbent Left Front ministers failed to get re-elected. All JD candidates finished in second place and RCPI lost its representation in the assembly. However, in terms of votes the Left Front and the five JD candidates got 18,143,795 votes (49.3%). Jyoti Basu's fifth Left Front government was sworn in, with 48 ministers representing all 13 districts of the state.

=== Results by alliance or party ===
Alliance/ Party		Popular vote			Seats		
Alliance/ Party		Votes	%	±pp	Contested	Won	Change
Left Front	Communist Party of India (Marxist)	13,949,664	37.92	▲1.05	217	157	▼32
Left Front	All India Forward Bloc	1,912,183	5.20	▼0.31	34	21	▼8
Left Front	Revolutionary Socialist Party	1,367,439	3.72	▲0.25	23	18	—
Left Front	Communist Party of India	642,993	1.75	▲0.21	12	6	▲1
Left Front	Janata Dal	105,697	0.29	▼0.39	5	0	▼1
Left Front	Revolutionary Communist Party of India (R)	105,366	0.29	New entry	2	0	New entry
Left Front	Total	18,083,342	49.17	—	293	202	—
INC+	Indian National Congress	14,523,964	39.48	▲4.36	288	82	▲39
INC+	Gorkha National Liberation Front	161,498	0.44	New entry	3	3	New entry
INC+	Total	14,685,462	39.92	—	291	85	—
Bharatiya Janata Party		2,372,480	6.45	▼4.89	292	0	—
Jharkhand Party (Naren)		145,503	0.40		8	1	
Jharkhand Mukti Morcha		134,436	0.37		26	0	
Forward Bloc (Socialist)		123,316	0.34		20	1	
Bahujan Samaj Party		67,853	0.18		48	0	
Communist Party of India (Marxist-Leninist) (Liberation)		47,206	0.13		30	0	
Akhil Bharatiya Gorkha League (Budhiman Garung)		43,261	0.12		3	0	
All India Indira Congress (Tiwari)		20,555	0.06		29	0	
Other Parties		106,209	0.28		151	0	
Independent politician		959,130	2.61	▼0.40	844	5	▲1
Total		36,788,753	100%	—	2,035	294	—

=== Results by district ===
District	Seats				
District	Seats	Left	INC	IND	OTH
Cooch Behar	9	6	1	1	1
Jalpaiguri	12	11	1	—N/a	—N/a
Darjeeling	5	2	—N/a	—N/a	3
Uttar Dinajpur	7	4	3	—N/a	—N/a
Dakshin Dinajpur	5	5	—N/a	—N/a	—N/a
Malda	11	3	8	—N/a	—N/a
Murshidabad	19	9	9	1	—N/a
Nadia	15	10	5	—N/a	—N/a
North 24 Parganas	28	24	4	—N/a	—N/a
South 24 Parganas	28	19	7	2	—N/a
Kolkata	21	6	15	—N/a	—N/a
Howrah	16	8	8	—N/a	—N/a
Hooghly	19	14	5	—N/a	—N/a
Purba Medinipur	17	10	7	—N/a	—N/a
Paschim Medinipur	20	17	1	1	1
Purulia	11	10	1	—N/a	—N/a
Bankura	13	13	—N/a	—N/a	—N/a
Bardhaman	26	22	4	—N/a	—N/a
Birbhum	12	9	3	—N/a	—N/a
Total	294	202	82	5	5

== Results by Constituency ==
Constituency		Winner				Runner Up				Margin	%
#	Name	Candidate	Party	Votes	%	Candidate	Party	Votes	%	Margin	%
1	Mekliganj (SC)	Ramesh Roy	AIFB	40,982	32.42	Sunil Chandra Ray	INC	38,999	30.85	1,983	1.57
2	Sitalkuchi (SC)	Sudhir Pramanik	CPI(M)	74,984	57.91	Birendra Narayan Barma	INC	42,227	32.61	32,757	25.30
3	Mathabhanga (SC)	Dinesh Chandra Dakua	CPI(M)	64,052	52.12	Jatindra Nath Barman	INC	46,731	38.03	17,321	14.09
4	Cooch Behar North	Mihir Goswami	INC	59,375	47.25	Aparajita Goppi	AIFB	52,511	41.79	6,864	5.46
5	Cooch Behar West	Soumindra Chandra Das	AIFB	67,686	48.08	Ahammed Abdul Jalil	INC	53,950	38.32	13,736	9.76
6	Sitai	Md. Fazle Haque	IND	79,912	54.79	Nripendra Nath Ray	AIFB	43,702	29.96	36,210	24.83
7	Dinhata	Kamal Guha	FB(S)	70,531	49.58	Dipak Sen Gupta	AIFB	37,520	26.37	33,011	23.21
8	Natabari	Sibendra Narayan Chowdhuri	CPI(M)	57,830	48.12	Rabindra Nath Ghosh	INC	48,172	40.09	9,658	8.03
9	Tufanganj (SC)	Puspa Chandra Das	CPI(M)	66,436	54.76	Sachindr Chandra Das	INC	39,583	32.63	26,853	22.13
10	Kumargram (ST)	Salib Toppo	RSP	59,032	52.21	Krishna Chik Baraik	INC	41,580	36.77	17,452	15.44
11	Kalchini (ST)	Monohar Tirkey	RSP	48,141	46.20	Khudiram Pahan	INC	45,287	43.46	2,854	2.74
12	Alipurduars	Nirmal Das	RSP	68,476	52.42	Manindralal Rakshit	INC	51,985	39.79	16,491	12.63
13	Falakata (SC)	Jogesh Chandra Barman	CPI(M)	64,756	53.05	Gajendra Nath Barman	INC	47,327	38.77	17,429	14.28
14	Madarihat (ST)	Sushil Kujur	RSP	57,663	54.42	Puspa Rani Lily Kindo	INC	33,085	31.22	24,578	23.20
15	Dhupguri (SC)	Banamali Roy	CPI(M)	57,714	49.51	Nripendra Nath Roy	INC	35,679	30.61	22,035	18.90
16	Nagrakata (ST)	Chaitan Munda	CPI(M)	71,274	58.52	Victor Lakra	INC	36,400	29.88	34,874	28.64
17	Mainaguri (SC)	Bachcha Mohan Ray	RSP	66,153	54.23	Manmatha Ray Basunia	INC	42,468	34.81	23,685	19.42
18	Mal (ST)	Jagannath Oraon	CPI(M)	60,559	54.79	Turi Kule Munda	INC	44,550	40.31	16,009	14.48
19	Kranti	Sudhan Raha	CPI(M)	61,803	55.79	Subhas Das	INC	39,774	35.90	22,029	19.89
20	Jalpaiguri	Anupam Sen	INC	48,597	43.85	Sudhansu Majumder	AIFB	44,889	40.51	3,708	3.34
21	Rajganj (SC)	Jatindra Nath Roy	CPI(M)	99,053	52.57	Ajit Kumar Ray	INC	61,079	32.41	37,974	20.16
22	Kalimpong	Gaulan Lepcha	GNLF	50,362	55.13	Norden Lama	ABGL	17,121	18.74	33,241	36.39
23	Darjeeling	Nar Bahadur Chettri	GNLF	51,501	50.89	Kamala Sanskrityayana	CPI(M)	26,034	25.72	25,467	25.17
24	Kurseong	Shanta Chhetri	GNLF	59,635	54.23	Tulsi Bhattarai	CPI(M)	40,674	36.99	18,961	17.24
25	Siliguri	Asok Bhattacharya	CPI(M)	1,06,062	55.32	Sankar Malakar	INC	51,989	27.11	54,073	28.21
26	Phansidewa (ST)	Prokash Minj	CPI(M)	85,845	50.79	Chhabilal Minj	INC	67,439	39.90	18,406	10.89
27	Chopra	Mahamuddin	CPI(M)	56,952	48.81	Hamidul Rahaman	INC	53,560	45.90	3,392	2.91
28	Islampur	Chowdhury Abdul Karim	INC	50,334	43.95	Md. Faruque Azam	CPI(M)	48,939	42.73	1,395	1.22
29	Goalpokhar	Hafiz Alam Sairani	AIFB	55,998	54.46	Md. Mustafa	INC	23,935	23.28	32,063	31.18
30	Karandighi	Suresh Chandra Singha	AIFB	56,251	40.97	Haji Sajjad Hussain	INC	50,480	36.76	5,771	4.21
31	Raiganj (SC)	Dilip Kumar Das	INC	56,203	39.18	Khagendra Nath Sinha	CPI(M)	53,913	37.58	2,290	1.60
32	Kaliaganj (SC)	Pramatha Nath Ray	INC	55,500	43.00	Ramani Kanta Debsarma	CPI(M)	50,545	39.16	4,955	3.84
33	Kushmandi (SC)	Roy Narmada Chandra	RSP	59,176	47.22	Krishna Chandra Sarkar	INC	49,232	39.29	9,944	7.93
34	Itahar	Sri Kumar Mukherjee	CPI	59,280	47.02	Abedin Zainal	INC	58,724	46.58	556	0.44
35	Gangarampur	Minati Ghosh	CPI(M)	84,218	55.62	Ashish Majumdar	BJP	61,881	40.87	22,337	14.75
36	Tapan (ST)	Khara Soren	RSP	65,142	53.91	Lakshmi Ram Hembram	INC	39,745	32.89	25,397	21.02
37	Kumarganj	Roy Dwijendra Nath	CPI(M)	62,816	46.22	Parinita Singha Roy	INC	47,606	35.03	15,210	11.19
38	Balurghat	Choudhury Biswanath	RSP	55,183	47.93	Khan Biplab	INC	46,562	40.45	8,621	7.48
39	Habibpur (ST)	Jadu Hembram	CPI(M)	55,288	48.00	Lucas Hembram	INC	37,395	32.46	17,893	15.54
40	Gajol (ST)	Debnath Murmu	CPI(M)	55,819	47.61	Benjamin Hemram	INC	40,660	34.68	15,159	12.93
41	Kharba	Mahbubul Hoque	INC	59,807	47.13	Nazmul Hoque	CPI(M)	53,077	41.83	6,730	5.30
42	Harishchandrapur	Birendra Kumar Maitra	AIFB	56,429	47.00	Alam Mostaque	INC	53,940	44.92	2,489	2.08
43	Ratua	Samar Mukherjee	INC	53,347	48.13	Mozammel Haque	CPI(M)	50,381	45.45	2,966	2.68
44	Araidanga	Sabitri Mitra	INC	55,306	50.25	Setara Begum	CPI(M)	48,629	44.19	6,677	6.06
45	Malda (SC)	Phani Bhusan Roy	INC	62,040	44.68	Subhendu Chowdhury	CPI(M)	55,501	39.97	6,539	4.71
46	Englishbazar	Goutam Chakravartty	INC	53,653	41.23	Ashok Bhattacharjya	CPI(M)	42,992	33.04	10,661	8.19
47	Manikchak	Ram Prabesh Mondal	INC	55,954	52.06	Subodh Choudhuri	CPI(M)	45,766	42.58	10,188	9.48
48	Suzapur	Rubi Noor	INC	69,826	61.13	Abdur Rauf	CPI(M)	36,673	32.11	33,153	29.02
49	Kaliachak	Abu Hasem Khan Chowdhury	INC	64,440	46.50	Biswanath Ghosh	CPI(M)	54,092	39.04	10,348	7.46
50	Farakka	Mainul Haque	INC	53,480	46.44	Abul Hasnat Khan	CPI(M)	45,917	39.87	7,563	6.57
51	Aurangabad	Humayun Reja	INC	57,485	46.54	Touab Ali	CPI(M)	52,842	42.78	4,643	3.76
52	Suti	Md. Sohrab	INC	46,800	40.24	Shish Mohammad	RSP	46,369	39.87	431	0.37
53	Sagardighi (SC)	Das Paresh Nath	CPI(M)	58,259	51.06	Nrisingha Kumar Mondal	INC	51,562	45.19	6,697	5.87
54	Jangipur	Habibur Rahaman	INC	58,181	46.36	Abdul Haque	RSP	57,490	45.81	691	0.55
55	Lalgola	Abu Hena	INC	64,337	50.42	Md. Johaque Ali	CPI(M)	55,650	43.61	8,687	6.81
56	Bhagabangola	Abu Sufian Sarkar	INC	58,865	48.02	Nawab Jani Meerza	CPI(M)	58,012	47.33	853	0.69
57	Nabagram	Adhir Ranjan Chowdhury	INC	76,852	55.84	Muzaffar Hossain	CPI(M)	56,523	41.07	20,329	14.77
58	Murshidabad	Mozammel Haque	IND	54,049	35.14	Abdul Ohab Mondal	INC	45,637	29.67	8,412	5.47
59	Jalangi	Unus Sarkar	CPI(M)	79,348	53.32	Samsuzzoha Biswas	INC	58,174	39.09	21,174	14.23
60	Domkal	Anisur Rahaman	CPI(M)	77,736	52.29	Sadeque Reza	INC	62,896	42.31	14,840	9.98
61	Naoda	Jayanta Kumar Biswas	RSP	75,268	53.07	Nasiruddin Khan	INC	58,462	41.22	16,806	11.85
62	Hariharpara	Mozammel Haque	CPI(M)	59,804	43.21	Mannan Hossain	INC	54,018	39.03	5,786	4.18
63	Berhampore	Maya Rani Paul	INC	81,452	49.89	Biswanath Banerjee	RSP	62,159	38.07	19,293	11.82
64	Beldanga	Timir Baran Bhaduri	RSP	67,965	49.58	Nurul Islam Choudhury	INC	59,854	43.66	8,111	5.92
65	Kandi	Atish Chandra Sinha	INC	65,490	49.10	Syed Wahed Reja	CPI	59,354	44.50	6,136	4.60
66	Khargram (SC)	Biswanath Mandal	CPI(M)	61,369	47.96	Madhab Chandra Marjit	INC	57,545	44.97	3,824	2.99
67	Barwan	Debabrata Banerjee	RSP	59,537	50.57	Ali Hossain Mondal	INC	49,335	41.90	10,202	8.67
68	Bharatpur	Id Mahammad	RSP	58,266	53.38	Satya Narayan Banerjee	INC	43,960	40.27	14,306	13.11
69	Karimpur	Chittaranjan Biswas	CPI(M)	64,561	47.56	Chira Ranjan Mandal	INC	44,215	32.57	20,346	14.99
70	Palashipara	Kamalendu Sanyal (Sasthi)	CPI(M)	65,306	47.29	Ujjal Biswas	INC	53,382	38.65	11,924	8.64
71	Nakashipara	Shaikh Khabir Uddin Ahmed	CPI(M)	54,600	43.75	Dhrubajyoti Ghosh	INC	53,135	42.57	1,465	1.18
72	Kaliganj	Abdus Salam Munshi	INC	50,665	42.67	Dhananjoy Modak	RSP	49,291	41.51	1,374	1.16
73	Chapra	Mir Quasem Mondal	CPI(M)	65,854	49.87	Julfikar Khan	INC	52,558	39.80	13,296	10.07
74	Krishnaganj (SC)	Sushil Biswas	CPI(M)	58,868	47.16	Bidhan Chandra Poddar	INC	57,170	45.80	1,698	1.36
75	Krishnagar East	Sibdas Mukherjee	INC	62,066	46.14	Radhanath Biswas	CPI(M)	59,181	44.00	2,885	2.14
76	Krishnagar West	Sunil Kumar Ghosh	CPI(M)	58,386	50.56	Biswarup Mukherjee	INC	39,653	34.33	18,733	16.23
77	Nabadwip	Biswanath Mitra	CPI(M)	54,704	47.49	Kartik Chatterjee	INC	42,729	37.10	11,975	10.39
78	Santipur	Ajoy De	INC	78,163	49.28	Bimalananda Mukherjee	RCPI	67,793	42.74	10,370	6.54
79	Hanskhali (SC)	Biswas Shashanka Shekhor	INC	78,662	49.60	Nayan Sarkar	CPI(M)	72,789	45.90	5,873	3.70
80	Ranaghat East (SC)	Binay Krishna Biswas	CPI(M)	82,678	48.37	Akhil Kumar Majumder	INC	71,705	41.95	10,973	6.42
81	Ranaghat West	Sankar Singha	INC	74,360	48.06	Nag Sourendra Nath	CPI(M)	70,238	45.39	4,122	2.67
82	Chakdaha	Satyasadhan Chakraborty	CPI(M)	97,454	51.66	Sukumar Sarkar	INC	75,838	40.20	21,616	11.46
83	Haringhata	Mili Hira	CPI(M)	84,251	50.13	Ratna Ghosh	INC	66,252	39.42	17,999	10.71
84	Bagdaha (SC)	Kamalakshi Biswas	AIFB	59,588	47.20	Kalidas Adhikari	INC	56,988	45.14	2,600	2.06
85	Bongaon	Pankaj Ghosh	CPI(M)	68,251	47.83	Bhupendra Nath Seth	INC	66,583	46.66	1,668	1.17
86	Gaighata	Manmatha Roy	CPI(M)	74,022	47.99	Prabir Banerjee	INC	68,625	44.49	5,397	3.50
87	Habra	Baren Basu	CPI(M)	65,254	43.67	Abdul Hamid Mandal	INC	64,311	43.03	943	0.64
88	Ashokenagar	Nirode Roy Choudhury	CPI(M)	61,789	45.11	Dhiman Roy	INC	43,280	31.59	18,509	13.52
89	Amdanga	Hashim Abdul Halim	CPI(M)	71,941	50.07	Md. Rafiqul Islam	INC	65,172	45.36	6,769	4.71
90	Barasat	Ashoke Mukherjee	INC	1,06,471	46.88	Saral Deb	AIFB	1,04,633	46.07	1,838	0.81
91	Rajarhat (SC)	Rabindra Nath Mondal	CPI(M)	96,947	47.90	Tanmoy Mondal	INC	89,656	44.30	7,291	3.60
92	Deganga	Md. Yakub	AIFB	60,876	49.63	Idris Ali	INC	47,127	38.42	13,749	11.21
93	Swarupnagar	Mostafa Bin Quassem	CPI(M)	61,279	48.02	Dipti Jana	INC	55,357	43.38	5,922	4.64
94	Baduria	Quazi Abdul Guffar	INC	58,967	47.84	Md. Shelim	CPI(M)	53,664	43.54	5,303	4.30
95	Basirhat	Narayan Mukherjee	CPI(M)	66,329	44.77	Asit Mazumder	INC	66,148	44.64	181	0.13
96	Hasnabad	Gautam Deb	CPI(M)	55,956	49.20	Rafikul Islam Mondal	INC	51,762	45.51	4,194	3.69
97	Haroa (SC)	Kshiti Ranjan Mondal	CPI(M)	75,668	55.93	Lakshmi Kanta Mondal	INC	48,726	36.01	26,942	19.92
98	Sandeshkhali (SC)	Kanti Biswas	CPI(M)	65,467	54.63	Ranjit Kumardas	INC	43,589	36.38	21,878	18.25
99	Hingalganj (SC)	Nripen Gayen	CPI(M)	62,866	54.76	Bidyut Kayal	INC	44,026	38.35	18,840	16.41
100	Gosaba (SC)	Ganesh Mondal	RSP	54,312	51.48	Sujit Pramanik	INC	43,526	41.26	10,786	10.22
101	Basanti (SC)	Subhas Naskar	RSP	69,834	51.18	Jayanta Naskar	INC	60,372	44.25	9,462	6.93
102	Kultali (SC)	Prabod Purkait	IND	62,453	48.80	Ram Sankar Haldar	CPI(M)	52,160	40.76	10,293	8.04
103	Joynagar	Deba Prasad Sarkar	IND	52,718	43.41	Rabindra Nath Basu	CPI(M)	27,224	22.42	25,494	20.99
104	Baruipur	Sobhan Deb Chattopadhyay	INC	75,314	49.16	Sujan Chakraborty	CPI(M)	73,788	48.16	1,526	1.00
105	Canning West (SC)	Bimal Mistry	CPI(M)	64,543	46.02	Gobinda Chandra Naskar	INC	59,038	42.10	5,505	3.92
106	Canning East	Abdur Razzak Molla	CPI(M)	89,062	76.19	Akram Laskar	INC	22,297	19.07	66,765	57.12
107	Bhangar	Badal Zamadar	CPI(M)	81,180	62.46	Azibar Rahaman	INC	43,120	33.18	38,060	29.28
108	Jadavpur	Buddhadev Bhattacharjee	CPI(M)	1,08,548	55.58	Kakoli Ghosh Dastidar	INC	72,364	37.05	36,184	18.53
109	Sonarpur (SC)	Bhadreswar Mondal	CPI(M)	98,765	50.02	Nirmal Mondal	INC	89,706	45.43	9,059	4.59
110	Bishnupur East (SC)	Ananda Kumar Biswas	CPI(M)	52,374	49.21	Mahadeb Naskar	INC	48,863	45.91	3,511	3.30
111	Bishnupur West	Sankar Saran Naskar	CPI(M)	59,431	48.54	Aruna Ghosh Dostider	INC	54,294	44.34	5,137	4.20
112	Behala East	Kumkum Chakraborti	CPI(M)	98,593	49.90	Sonali Guha	INC	89,459	45.28	9,134	4.62
113	Behala West	Nirmal Mukherjee	CPI(M)	85,695	47.58	Kumud Bhattacharjee	INC	83,903	46.58	1,792	1.00
114	Garden Reach	Mohammed Amin	CPI(M)	66,006	52.80	Fazle Azim Molla	INC	51,838	41.47	14,168	11.33
115	Maheshtala	Mursalin Molla	CPI(M)	72,274	51.78	Gouranga Mukherjee	INC	58,463	41.89	13,811	9.89
116	Budge Budge	Ashok Kumar Deb	INC	66,553	52.16	Dipak Mukherjee	CPI(M)	55,192	43.26	11,361	8.90
117	Satgachia	Jyoti Basu	CPI(M)	58,597	48.69	Bag Chitta Ranjan	INC	47,487	39.46	11,110	9.23
118	Falta	Sudhir Bhattacharjee	INC	51,558	49.19	Arati Dasgupta	CPI(M)	46,909	44.75	4,649	4.44
119	Diamond Harbour	Sheikh Daulat Ali	INC	61,744	47.00	Abdul Quiyom Molla	CPI(M)	55,643	42.35	6,101	4.65
120	Magrahat West	Abul Basar Laskar	INC	54,898	46.30	Anuradha Putatunda	CPI(M)	54,825	46.24	73	0.06
121	Magrahat East (SC)	Nirmal Sinha	CPI(M)	62,045	49.72	Namita Saha	INC	57,918	46.41	4,127	3.31
122	Mandirbazar (SC)	Nikunja Paik	CPI(M)	57,805	47.04	Tapan Sardar	INC	55,927	45.51	1,878	1.53
123	Mathurapur	Satya Ranjan Bapuli	INC	63,952	45.59	Kanti Bhusan Gangopadhyay	CPI(M)	61,297	43.70	2,655	1.89
124	Kulpi (SC)	Sakuntala Paik	CPI(M)	53,779	49.47	Kirtibas Sarder	INC	51,566	47.43	2,213	2.04
125	Patharpratima	Gopal Krishna Dey	INC	54,995	47.48	Janmejay Manna	CPI(M)	54,854	47.36	141	0.12
126	Kakdwip	Ashok Giri	CPI(M)	58,362	49.42	Mantu Ram Pakhira	INC	56,130	47.53	2,232	1.89
127	Sagar	Prabhanjan Mondal	CPI(M)	69,285	51.46	Haripada Sen	INC	62,874	46.70	6,411	4.76
128	Bijpur	Kamal Sengupta Basu	CPI(M)	64,800	53.85	Mrinal Kanti Singha Roy	INC	51,334	42.66	13,466	11.19
129	Naihati	Ranjit Kundu	CPI(M)	66,522	52.37	Adhikary Tarun	INC	51,757	40.74	14,765	11.63
130	Bhatpara	Bidyut Ganguli	CPI(M)	48,232	49.61	Dharmpal Gupta	INC	34,592	35.58	13,640	14.03
131	Jagatdal	Anay Gopal Sinha	INC	59,534	45.57	Nihar Basu	AIFB	59,417	45.48	117	0.09
132	Noapara	Madan Mohan Nath	CPI(M)	48,394	48.65	Sris Das	INC	44,030	44.26	4,364	4.39
133	Titagarh	Prabin Kumar Shaw	CPI(M)	41,906	47.54	Ashok Shukla	INC	41,359	46.92	547	0.62
134	Khardah	Asim Kumar Dasgupta	CPI(M)	85,517	52.32	Chinmoy Chatterjee	INC	64,988	39.76	20,529	12.56
135	Panihati	Nirmal Ghosh	INC	72,572	46.18	Tania Chakrabarty (Basu)	CPI(M)	71,703	45.62	869	0.56
136	Kamarhati	Santi Ghatak	CPI(M)	65,691	50.99	Sambhunath Dutta	INC	52,921	41.08	12,770	9.91
137	Baranagar	Amar Choudhury	RSP	84,785	48.51	Silbhadra Dutta	INC	76,895	44.00	7,890	4.51
138	Dum Dum	Sankar Sen	CPI(M)	92,102	53.20	Nitai Ghosh	INC	62,555	36.13	29,547	17.07
139	Belgachia East	Subhas Chakraborty	CPI(M)	1,05,328	48.33	Arunava Ghosh	INC	96,388	44.23	8,940	4.10
140	Cossipur	Bandyopadhyay Tarak	INC	33,799	46.23	Anup Das	CPI(M)	33,337	45.60	462	0.63
141	Shyampukur	Santi Ranjan Ganguly	AIFB	30,759	48.05	Samir Chakraborty	INC	28,124	43.94	2,635	4.11
142	Jorabagan	Sanjoy Bakshi	INC	21,552	37.77	Sarala Maheswari	CPI(M)	19,844	34.77	1,708	3.00
143	Jorasanko	Deokinandan Poddar	INC	23,787	49.74	Satish Narayan Bajaj	AIFB	16,073	33.61	7,714	16.13
144	Bara Bazar	Rajesh Khaitan	INC	16,748	37.01	Md. Asiruddin	JD	15,911	35.16	837	1.85
145	Bow Bazar	Sudip Bandyopadhyay	INC	36,579	59.37	Sujit Mandal	JD	17,181	27.88	19,398	31.49
146	Chowringhee	Subarata Mukherjee	INC	48,648	60.62	Paul Mantosh	JD	19,968	24.88	28,680	35.74
147	Kabitirtha	Ram Pyare Ram	INC	62,923	61.61	Moinuddin Shams.	AIFB	30,982	30.34	31,941	31.27
148	Alipore	Saugata Roy	INC	51,590	58.71	Rathindranath Roychowdhury	CPI(M)	30,879	35.14	20,711	23.57
149	Rashbehari Avenue	Hoimi Basu	INC	48,253	58.97	Ranjan Banerjee	CPI(M)	27,625	33.76	20,628	25.21
150	Tollygunge	Pankaj Banerjee	INC	53,871	48.19	Ashis Roy	CPI(M)	51,189	45.79	2,682	2.40
151	Dhakuria	Kshiti Goswami	RSP	66,593	49.15	Sukhendu Shekhar Roy	INC	59,542	43.95	7,051	5.20
152	Ballygunge	Rabin Deb	CPI(M)	69,185	47.51	Dibyendu Biswas	INC	67,704	46.50	1,481	1.01
153	Entally	Sultan Ahmed	INC	48,434	49.43	Ziauddin Ahmed	CPI(M)	42,794	43.67	5,640	5.76
154	Taltola (SC)	Tapati Saha	CPI(M)	49,751	53.61	Sambhunath Kow (Lalu)	INC	37,255	40.15	12,496	13.46
155	Beliaghata	Manabendra Mukherjee	CPI(M)	56,681	51.74	Krishna Debnath	INC	47,022	42.92	9,659	8.82
156	Sealdah	Somendra Nath Mitra	INC	33,950	66.16	Arun Prakash Chatterjee	CPI	12,985	25.30	20,965	40.86
157	Vidyasagar	Tapas Roy	INC	38,065	50.87	Abir Lal Mukherjee	CPI(M)	31,571	42.19	6,494	8.68
158	Burtola	Sadhan Pande	INC	50,368	63.70	Parimal Routh	RSP	22,121	27.98	28,247	35.72
159	Manicktola	Paresh Paul	INC	62,088	48.17	Shyamal Chakraborty	CPI(M)	61,581	47.78	507	0.39
160	Belgachia West	Rajdeo Goala	CPI(M)	55,498	52.52	Sadhan Das	INC	43,112	40.79	12,386	11.73
161	Bally	Kanika Ganguly	CPI(M)	54,996	50.54	Bani Kumar Singha	INC	39,369	36.18	15,627	14.36
162	Howrah North	Lagan Deo Singh	CPI(M)	68,432	55.21	Asok Ghosh	INC	47,714	38.50	20,718	16.71
163	Howrah Central	Ambica Banerjee	INC	56,763	59.17	Sureswar Dutta	JD	26,764	27.90	29,999	31.27
164	Howrah South	Pralay Talukdar	CPI(M)	46,915	45.17	Arup Ray	INC	44,662	43.00	2,253	2.17
165	Shibpur	Jatu Lahiri	INC	1,02,985	50.62	Prabir Kumar Banerjee	AIFB	88,111	43.31	14,874	7.31
166	Domjur	Padmanidhi Dhar	CPI(M)	95,319	51.81	Bhabani Prasad Bhattacharyya	INC	82,649	44.92	12,670	6.89
167	Jagatballavpur	M. Ansaruddin	CPI(M)	69,056	49.53	Nityananda Maity	INC	63,119	45.27	5,937	4.26
168	Panchla	Gulsan Mullick	INC	65,091	49.41	Sailen Mondal	AIFB	56,777	43.10	8,314	6.31
169	Sankrail (SC)	Sital Kumar Sardar	INC	65,599	47.04	Basudeb Dhali	CPI(M)	60,611	43.46	4,988	3.58
170	Uluberia North (SC)	Ramjanam Majhi	INC	61,560	48.83	Asta Das	CPI(M)	54,001	42.83	7,559	6.00
171	Uluberia South	Ghose Rabindra	AIFB	57,913	48.82	Pulak Roy	INC	48,553	40.93	9,360	7.89
172	Shyampur	Sanjib Kumar Das	INC	59,081	48.54	Jaladhar Samanta	AIFB	55,554	45.64	3,527	2.90
173	Bagnan	Sabuj Dutta	INC	62,805	48.57	Nirupama Chatterjee	CPI(M)	60,075	46.46	2,730	2.11
174	Kalyanpur	Asit Mitra	INC	55,701	49.51	Maqsud Ahmed	CPI(M)	54,061	48.05	1,640	1.46
175	Amta	Pratyush Mukherjee	CPI(M)	62,001	53.47	Prasun Bakuly	INC	51,807	44.68	10,194	8.79
176	Udaynarayanpur	Nanigopal Chowdhury	CPI(M)	64,955	54.66	Syamal Ranjan Karar	INC	46,102	38.80	18,853	15.86
177	Jangipara	Ibha Dey	CPI(M)	65,269	50.90	Dwipen Mukherjee	INC	57,171	44.58	8,098	6.32
178	Chanditala	Akbor Ali Khandoker	INC	72,490	48.78	Ghosh Malin	CPI(M)	70,376	47.36	2,114	1.42
179	Uttarpara	Jyoti Krishna Chattapadhyay	CPI(M)	75,680	48.84	Pabitra Gupta	INC	69,929	45.13	5,751	3.71
180	Serampore	Jyoti Chowdhury	INC	55,923	49.81	Asimes Goswami	CPI(M)	40,011	35.64	15,912	14.17
181	Champdani	Abdul Mannan	INC	74,233	48.17	Sunil Sarkar	CPI(M)	65,231	42.33	9,002	5.84
182	Chandernagore	Kamal Mukherjee	INC	69,565	49.93	Sandhya Chattopadhyay	CPI(M)	62,531	44.88	7,034	5.05
183	Singur	Das Bidyut Kumar	CPI(M)	66,445	50.69	Dwijaprosad Bhattacharya	INC	58,739	44.81	7,706	5.88
184	Haripal	Kali Prasad Biswas	CPI(M)	63,998	52.91	Samiran Mitra	INC	53,091	43.89	10,907	9.02
185	Tarakeswar	Pratim Chatterjee	CPI(M)	70,127	57.46	Ajit Kumar Ghosh	INC	48,608	39.83	21,519	17.63
186	Chinsurah	Naren Dey	AIFB	68,281	47.20	Tapan Dasgupta	INC	66,998	46.32	1,283	0.88
187	Bansberia	Robin Mukherjee	INC	62,528	49.25	Prabir Sengupta	CPI(M)	59,281	46.69	3,247	2.56
188	Balagarh (SC)	Dibakanta Routh	CPI(M)	66,182	52.31	Biswanath Malik	INC	51,231	40.49	14,951	11.82
189	Pandua	Ali Sk. Majed	CPI(M)	77,911	54.75	Madhusudan Banerjee	INC	52,801	37.11	25,110	17.64
190	Polba	Saktipada Khanra	CPI(M)	62,985	50.52	Mainul Haque	INC	57,872	46.42	5,113	4.10
191	Dhaniakhali (SC)	Kripasindhu Saha	AIFB	76,412	60.68	Asima Patra	INC	44,474	35.32	31,938	25.36
192	Pursurah	Nimai Mal	CPI(M)	71,802	59.03	Gour Mohan Maity	INC	46,237	38.01	25,565	21.02
193	Khanakul (SC)	Banshi Badan Maitra	CPI(M)	73,196	55.16	Basudeb Hajra	INC	54,478	41.05	18,718	14.11
194	Arambagh	Binoy Datta	CPI(M)	91,939	62.43	Abdus Sukur	INC	47,839	32.48	44,100	29.95
195	Goghat (SC)	Shiba Prasad Malick	AIFB	90,288	69.15	Lakshmi Charan Kanri	INC	26,975	20.66	63,313	48.49
196	Chandrakona	Gurupada Dutta	CPI(M)	79,017	58.96	Maloy Bhattacharya	INC	47,696	35.59	31,321	23.37
197	Ghatal (SC)	Ratan Pakhira	CPI(M)	69,342	56.54	Rajani Kanta Dolui	INC	51,158	41.71	18,184	14.83
198	Daspur	Mukhopadhaya Chitta Ranjan	CPI(M)	56,560	51.69	Goswami Jagannath	INC	50,770	46.40	5,790	5.29
199	Nandanpur	Chhaya Bera	CPI(M)	55,826	50.96	Nirmal Maity	INC	51,769	47.25	4,057	3.71
200	Panskura West	Chitta Ranjan Das Thakur	CPI	57,644	47.03	Khan Jakiur Rahaman	INC	54,190	44.21	3,454	2.82
201	Panskura East	Biplab Ray Chowdhury	INC	62,496	47.65	Sarkar Sisir	CPI(M)	62,359	47.55	137	0.10
202	Tamluk	Anil Mudi	INC	61,409	46.99	Surajit Bagchi	CPI	61,079	46.74	330	0.25
203	Moyna	Dipak Bera	CPI(M)	63,420	48.94	Manik Bhowmik	INC	63,324	48.87	96	0.07
204	Mahishadal	Sukumar Das	INC	58,754	50.83	Chakraborty Surya	CPI(M)	52,464	45.39	6,290	5.44
205	Sutahata (SC)	Tushar Kanti Mandal	INC	81,461	50.81	Nityananda Bera	CPI(M)	76,238	47.55	5,223	3.26
206	Nandigram	Debisankar Panda	INC	61,885	49.23	Sakti Bal	CPI	61,747	49.12	138	0.11
207	Narghat	Brahmamoy Nanda	CPI(M)	68,440	51.88	Suvendu Kumar Bej	INC	60,265	45.68	8,175	6.20
208	Bhagabanpur	Khanra Ajit	INC	51,556	47.99	Pradhan Prasanta Kumar	CPI(M)	51,263	47.72	293	0.27
209	Khajuri (SC)	Mondal Ramchandra	CPI(M)	60,289	55.51	Paik Sunirmal	INC	45,709	42.08	14,580	13.43
210	Contai North	Chakradhar Maikap	CPI(M)	55,807	47.97	Mukul Bikash Maiti	INC	54,574	46.91	1,233	1.06
211	Contai South	Sailaja Kumar Das	INC	54,466	48.56	Sukhendu Maity	CPI	46,665	41.60	7,801	6.96
212	Ramnagar	Mrinal Kanti Roy	CPI(M)	63,538	48.32	Dipak Kumar Das	INC	63,488	48.28	50	0.04
213	Egra	Sinha Prabodh Chandra	CPI(M)	62,144	51.28	Sohan Jyoti Maiti	INC	50,430	41.61	11,714	9.67
214	Mugberia	Kiranmoy Nanda	CPI(M)	65,331	56.20	Narayan Mukherjee	INC	46,306	39.84	19,025	16.36
215	Pataspur	Kamakhya Nandan Das	CPI	65,483	51.77	Paresh Chandra Bhunia	INC	57,009	45.07	8,474	6.70
216	Sabang	Bangal Makhanlal	IND	60,453	49.91	Manas Bhunia	INC	59,628	49.23	825	0.68
217	Pingla	Ram Pada Samanta	CPI(M)	67,223	56.76	Swapan Dobe	INC	47,891	40.44	19,332	16.32
218	Debra	Sk. Jahangir Karim	CPI(M)	71,478	57.40	Rabindra Nath Bera	INC	42,224	33.91	29,254	23.49
219	Keshpur (SC)	Dal Nandarani	CPI(M)	83,846	65.07	Sannyasi Dolai	INC	40,376	31.33	43,470	33.74
220	Garhbeta East	Susanta Ghosh	CPI(M)	78,739	66.66	Tapan Chakraborty	INC	27,363	23.16	51,376	43.50
221	Garhbeta West (SC)	Krishnaprasad Duley	CPI(M)	75,573	62.33	Siddhartha Bisai	INC	26,777	22.08	48,796	40.25
222	Salbani	Khagendra Nath Mahato	CPI(M)	65,073	60.21	Tapas Das	JP(N)	25,459	23.56	39,614	36.65
223	Midnapore	Purnendu Sengupta	CPI	73,008	50.80	Dinen Roy	INC	57,112	39.74	15,896	11.06
224	Kharagpur Town	Gyan Singh Sohanpal	INC	39,983	42.13	Kalidas Nayak	CPI(M)	24,859	26.19	15,124	15.94
225	Kharagpur Rural	Haque Nazmul	CPI(M)	73,097	57.22	Ranjit Basu	INC	43,880	34.35	29,217	22.87
226	Keshiari (ST)	Maheswar Murmu	CPI(M)	82,366	66.95	Gouri Tudu	INC	31,035	25.23	51,331	41.72
227	Narayangarh	Surjya Kanta Mishra	CPI(M)	79,565	60.78	Durgesh Mishra	INC	39,911	30.49	39,654	30.29
228	Dantan	Nanda Gopal Bhattacharjee	CPI	77,024	63.81	Sunil Baran Giri	INC	28,639	23.73	48,385	40.08
229	Nayagram (ST)	Subhas Chandra Saren	CPI(M)	57,954	57.90	Madhu Sudan Saren	INC	17,987	17.97	39,967	39.93
230	Gopiballavpur	Rana Sakti	CPI(M)	73,308	63.19	Rekha Rani Mahata	INC	20,504	17.67	52,804	45.52
231	Jhargram	Buddhadev Bhakat	CPI(M)	87,886	66.43	Chaitnya Murmu	INC	19,975	15.10	67,911	51.33
232	Binpur (ST)	Naren Hansda	JP(N)	50,981	47.83	Durga Tudu	CPI(M)	50,497	47.37	484	0.46
233	Banduan (ST)	Lakhiram Kisku	CPI(M)	53,680	56.19	Sital Chandra Hembram	INC	18,097	18.94	35,583	37.25
234	Manbazar	Kamala Kanta Mahata	CPI(M)	53,155	49.24	Sitaram Mahata	INC	47,514	44.02	5,641	5.22
235	Balrampur (ST)	Bhandu Majhi	CPI(M)	61,405	63.95	Dulali Mandi	INC	19,876	20.70	41,529	43.25
236	Arsa	Nishi Kanta Mehta	AIFB	46,914	45.96	Kamakshya Prasad Deo	INC	38,030	37.26	8,884	8.70
237	Jhalda	Satya Ranjan Mahato	AIFB	48,030	45.96	Subhas Mahato	INC	44,835	42.90	3,195	3.06
238	Jaipur	Shantiram Mahato	INC	52,519	49.28	Bindeswar Mahato	AIFB	48,060	45.09	4,459	4.19
239	Purulia	Mamata Mukherjee	CPI(M)	59,120	48.06	Sukumar Roy	INC	56,738	46.12	2,382	1.94
240	Para (SC)	Bilasi Bala Sahis	CPI(M)	64,837	59.52	Gobordhan Bagti	JMM	20,352	18.68	44,485	40.84
241	Raghunathpur (SC)	Natabar Bagdi	CPI(M)	47,701	49.33	Nabakumar Bouri	INC	32,235	33.33	15,466	16.00
242	Kashipur (ST)	Rabindranath Hembram	CPI(M)	54,487	56.93	Patar Subhas Chandra	INC	28,373	29.64	26,114	27.29
243	Hura	Abinas Mahato	CPI(M)	54,490	54.58	Baghambar Mahato	JMM	23,606	23.65	30,884	30.93
244	Taldangra	Monoranjan Patra	CPI(M)	76,810	60.94	Kamakshya Prasad Deo	INC	31,781	25.22	45,029	35.72
245	Raipur (ST)	Upen Kisku	CPI(M)	67,754	55.54	Smritirekha Kisku	INC	26,278	21.54	41,476	34.00
246	Ranibandh (ST)	Deblina Hembram	CPI(M)	58,474	55.86	Anil Hansda	INC	26,065	24.90	32,409	30.96
247	Indpur (SC)	Kirity Bagdi	CPI	60,482	59.22	Layek Bibekananda	INC	15,966	15.63	44,516	43.59
248	Chhatna	Subhas Goswami	RSP	49,362	51.57	Swapan Mondal	INC	36,860	38.51	12,502	13.06
249	Gangajalghati (SC)	Angad Bauri	CPI(M)	63,949	59.43	Guiram Maji	INC	40,346	37.49	23,603	21.94
250	Barjora	Susmita Biswas	CPI(M)	66,842	51.96	Tapasi Banerjee	INC	53,121	41.30	13,721	10.66
251	Bankura	Partha De	CPI(M)	64,325	50.91	Asis Chakrabartty	INC	49,449	39.14	14,876	11.77
252	Onda	Anil Mukherjee	AIFB	68,070	56.16	Arup Khan	INC	33,742	27.84	34,328	28.32
253	Vishnupur	Jayanta Chowdhury	CPI(M)	67,000	56.13	Buddhadeb Mukherjee	INC	42,750	35.81	24,250	20.32
254	Kotulpur	Gouripada Dutta	CPI(M)	84,250	63.80	Nikhil Bose	INC	36,434	27.59	47,816	36.21
255	Indas (SC)	Nandadulal Majhi	CPI(M)	76,851	63.22	Naba Kumar Rajak	INC	25,958	21.35	50,893	41.87
256	Sonamukhi (SC)	Haradhan Bauri	CPI(M)	64,376	56.21	Pulakesh Saha	INC	39,884	34.82	24,492	21.39
257	Kulti	Acharyya Maniklal	AIFB	49,852	44.03	Ajit Kr. Ghatak	INC	47,987	42.38	1,865	1.65
258	Barabani	Manik Upadhyay	INC	61,225	50.40	Paresh Maji	CPI(M)	51,959	42.77	9,266	7.63
259	Hirapur	Shyamadas Banerjee	INC	31,813	33.13	Mumtaz Hassan	JD	25,873	26.94	5,940	6.19
260	Asansol	Tapas Banerjee	INC	58,845	50.06	Goutam Roychowdhury	CPI(M)	47,211	40.16	11,634	9.90
261	Raniganj	Chowdhury Bansa Gopal	CPI(M)	71,337	62.81	Senapati Mondal	INC	35,689	31.42	35,648	31.39
262	Jamuria	Pelab Kabi	CPI(M)	68,758	63.06	Adhikari Santosh	INC	32,936	30.21	35,822	32.85
263	Ukhra (SC)	Bagdi Lakhan	CPI(M)	67,298	48.21	Jethu Ram	INC	58,722	42.07	8,576	6.14
264	Durgapur-I	Mrinal Banerjee	CPI(M)	59,630	51.84	Mrigendranath Pal	INC	42,635	37.07	16,995	14.77
265	Durgapur-II	Debabrata Benerjee	CPI(M)	95,298	50.78	Malay Kanti Dutta	INC	67,906	36.18	27,392	14.60
266	Kanksa (SC)	Ankura Saresh	CPI(M)	74,242	61.65	Himangshu Mondal	INC	30,754	25.54	43,488	36.11
267	Ausgram (SC)	Kartick Chandra Bag	CPI(M)	81,278	66.19	Sukumar Saha	INC	32,797	26.71	48,481	39.48
268	Bhatar	Subhas Mondal	CPI(M)	70,340	58.99	Susanta Ghosh	INC	39,336	32.99	31,004	26.00
269	Galsi	Idrish Mondal	AIFB	70,242	60.82	Syed Imdad Ali	INC	31,327	27.12	38,915	33.70
270	Burdwan North	Nisith Adhikary	CPI(M)	93,617	62.48	Raimoni Das	INC	46,081	30.75	47,536	31.73
271	Burdwan South	Shyamaprosad Bose	CPI(M)	82,667	50.58	Ghosh Sadhan Kumar	INC	68,377	41.84	14,290	8.74
272	Khandaghosh (SC)	Dalui Shibaprasad	CPI(M)	77,102	66.39	Basudev Mandal	INC	32,041	27.59	45,061	38.80
273	Raina	Shyamaprosad Pal	CPI(M)	79,664	65.25	Arabinda Bhattacheryya	INC	34,055	27.89	45,609	37.36
274	Jamalpur (SC)	Samar Hazra	CPI(M)	79,972	58.65	Baidya Nath Das	INC	45,247	33.18	34,725	25.47
275	Memari	Tapas Chattopadhyay	CPI(M)	94,636	60.36	Naba Kumar Chatterjee	INC	49,826	31.78	44,810	28.58
276	Kalna	Anju Kar	CPI(M)	72,329	52.40	Lakshman Kumar Roy	INC	55,825	40.44	16,504	11.96
277	Nadanghat	Biren Ghosh	CPI(M)	69,770	47.02	Swapan Debnath	INC	58,802	39.63	10,968	7.39
278	Manteswar	Abu Ayes Mondal	CPI(M)	67,757	57.51	Debabrata Roy	INC	44,451	37.73	23,306	19.78
279	Purbasthali	Dutta Himangshu	CPI(M)	61,076	47.53	Ansar Mondal	INC	41,233	32.09	19,843	15.44
280	Katwa	Rabindra Nath Chatterjee	INC	70,517	50.42	Anjan Chatterjee	CPI(M)	63,172	45.17	7,345	5.25
281	Mangalkot	Sadhana Mallik	CPI(M)	60,677	54.58	Absar Nurul Mondal	INC	40,186	36.15	20,491	18.43
282	Ketugram (SC)	Majhi Tamal	CPI(M)	66,613	56.64	Narayan Chandra Poddar	INC	42,719	36.32	23,894	20.32
283	Nanur (SC)	Anandagopal Das	CPI(M)	62,252	56.66	Sibkinkar Saha	INC	41,029	37.34	21,223	19.32
284	Bolpur	Tapan Hore	RSP	65,121	61.19	Sibsankar Banerjee	INC	24,031	22.58	41,090	38.61
285	Labhpur	Manik Chandra Mondal	CPI(M)	64,383	60.48	Deb Ranjan Mukhopadhayay	INC	35,155	33.02	29,228	27.46
286	Dubrajpur	Bhakti Bhusan Mondal	AIFB	66,312	57.02	Arun Kumar Chakravorty	INC	36,538	31.42	29,774	25.60
287	Rajnagar (SC)	Bijoy Bagdi	AIFB	55,760	54.84	Asesh Mondal	INC	27,926	27.46	27,834	27.38
288	Suri	Suniti Chattaraj	INC	67,227	49.87	Tapan Roy	CPI(M)	60,488	44.87	6,739	5.00
289	Mahammad Bazar	Dhiren Sen	CPI(M)	65,812	56.41	Rajaram Ghosh	INC	38,671	33.14	27,141	23.27
290	Mayureswar (SC)	Dhiren Let	CPI(M)	57,791	56.27	Arjun Saha	BJP	25,273	24.61	32,518	31.66
291	Rampurhat	Mahammad Hannan	AIFB	51,139	44.77	Satyen Das	BJP	40,916	35.82	10,223	8.95
292	Hansan (SC)	Asit Kumar Mal	INC	55,256	51.77	Mihir Bain	RCPI	37,573	35.21	17,683	16.56
293	Nalhati	Kalimuddin Shams	AIFB	51,401	48.47	Sharif Hossain	INC	39,715	37.45	11,686	11.02
294	Murarai	Motahar Hossain	INC	56,616	49.36	Moyazzem Hossain	CPI(M)	51,335	44.76	5,281	4.60

== Aftermath ==
The Congress lost power in the general elections to the BJP, however BJP was unable to obtain majority in the Parliament on its own. Jyoti Basu, who had been re-elected as CM for a record 5th time, was offered the post of Prime Minister by both the Congress & the Janata Dal following the resignation of BJP's Atal Bihari Vajpayee within 13 days of assuming power due to lack of numbers in the Lok Sabha, lack of a consensual prime-ministerial candidate in the Congress & V. P. Singh refusing to become prime minister again. However CPI(M)'s highest decision-making body refused this offer, believing that if it accepted Basu's prime-ministership, then due to lack of numbers in the Lok Sabha, it would have to bend to the will of the Congress, which it saw as a bourgeois organisation. Jyoti Basu later remarked that this decision of the CPI(M) was a "historic blunder". Thus being denied prime-ministership, Basu put forward the name of Janata Dal leader & Karnataka CM H. D. Deve Gowda as the prime-ministerial candidate, which was accepted by the Congress, Janata-Dal, Left Front & other parties allied with them. Deve Gowda resigned after a year due to withdrawal of Congress' support & was succeeded by his Minister of External Affairs, Janata Dal leader Inder Kumar Gujral. Gujral resigned a year later, due to split in the Janata Dal caused by Lalu Prasad Yadav's expulsion due to his involvement in the fodder scam & the Congress withdrawing its support due to Gujral's refusal to expel DMK from the government, whose leader M. Karunanidhi had been implicated in assisting Rajiv Gandhi's murder in Jain Commission's report.

In January 1998, following disagreements with both AICC President Sitaram Kesri & state PCC president Somen Mitra over the Congress party's approach towards the Left Front, Mamata Banerjee left the Congress & formed her own party, consisting mostly of the supporters of Siddhartha Shankar Ray. Her party, in alliance with BJP, won 7 seats from the state in the general elections held on February that year, while the Congress retained only one seat & lost 7 others from the state. Somen Mitra resigned as the state PCC chief after this debacle & was succeeded by A. B. A. Ghani Khan Choudhury, the lone Congress MP from the state.
