= 2006 West Bengal Legislative Assembly election =

2006 West Bengal Legislative Assembly Election
- 17 April – 8 May 2006

All 294 seats in the West Bengal Legislative Assembly 148 seats needed for a majority
- Registered: 48,165,156
- Turnout: 81.97%
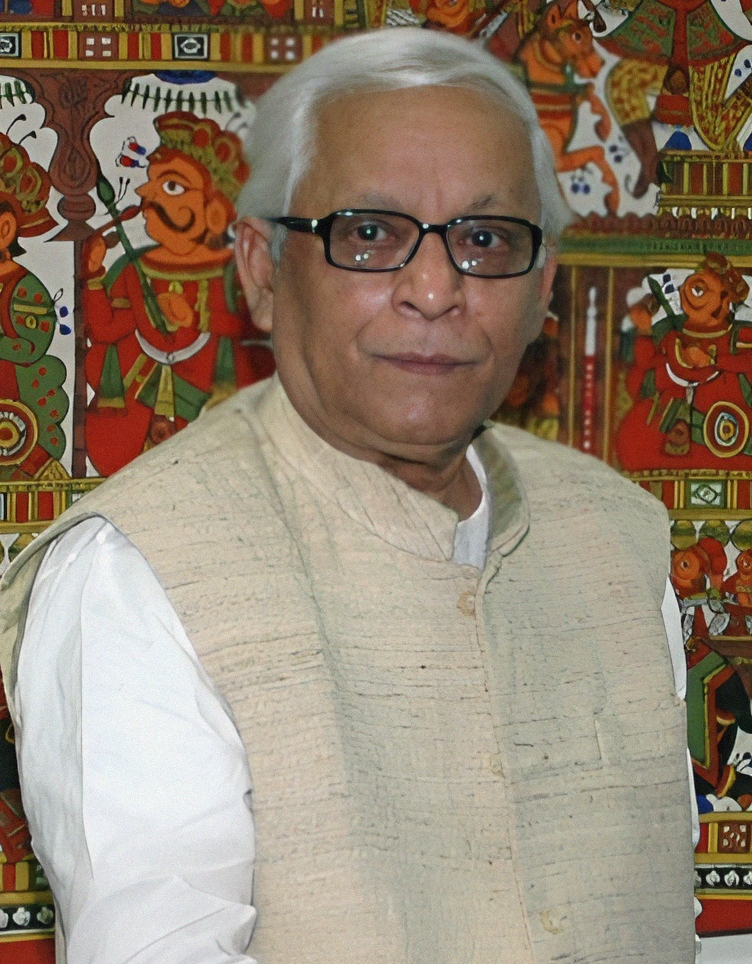

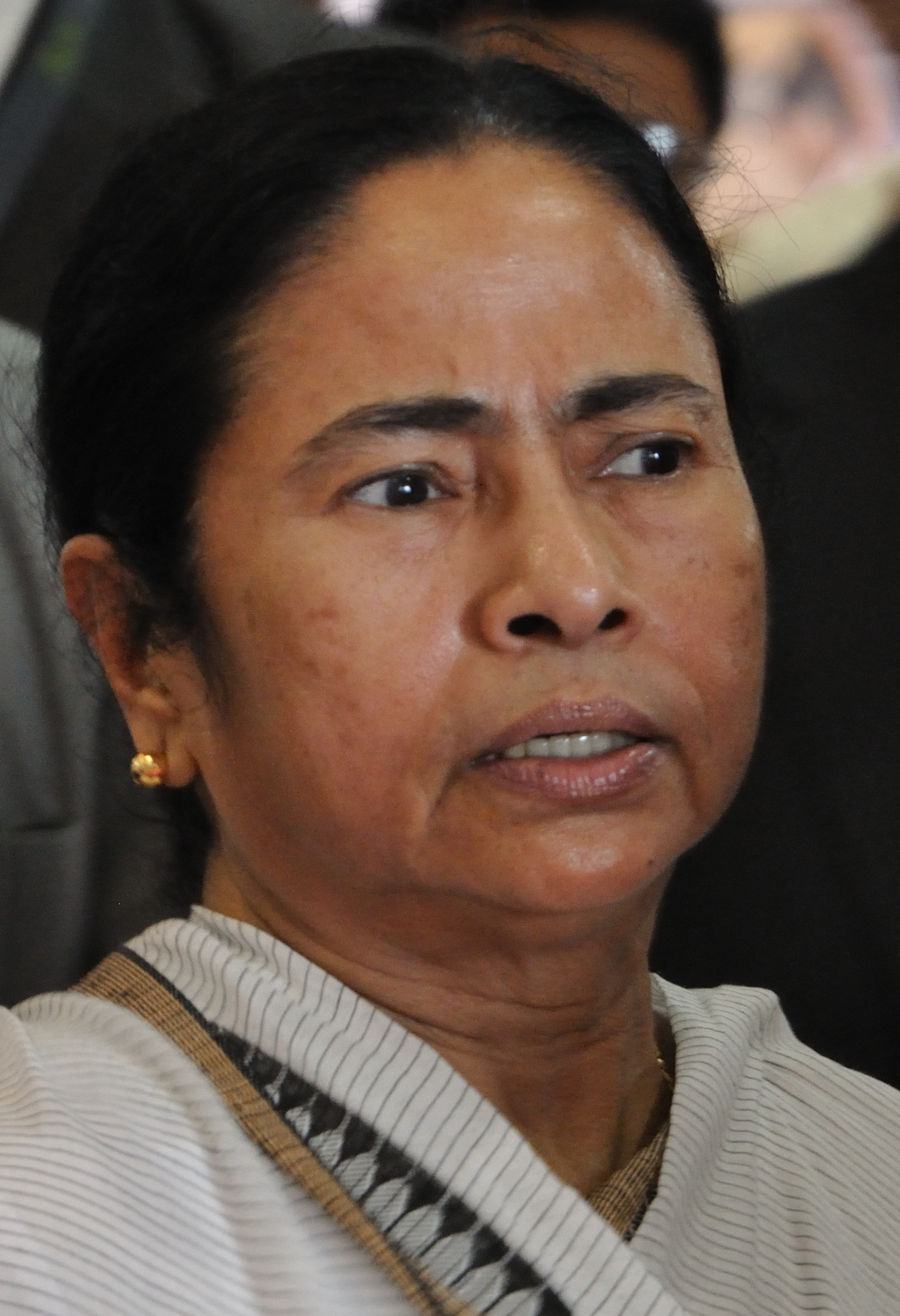

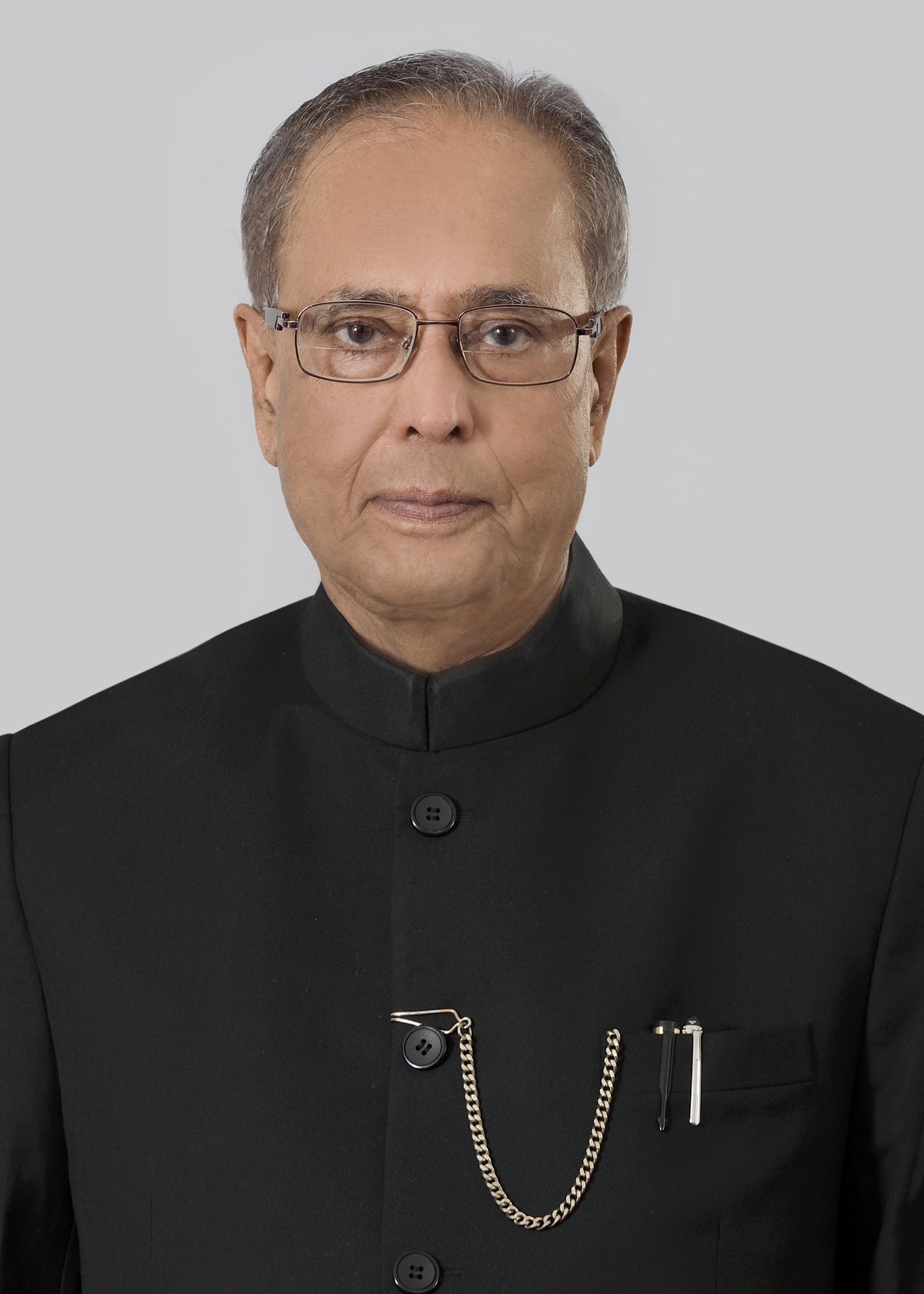
	First party	Second party	Third party
Leader	Buddhadeb Bhattacharjee	Mamata Banerjee	Pranab Mukherjee
Party	CPI(M)	AITC	INC
Alliance	LF	NDA	UPA
Leader since	2000	1998	2000
Leader's seat	Jadavpur	Did Not Contest (Note: Banerjee was the sitting MP for South Kolkata.)	Did not contest (Note: Mukherjee was the sitting MP for Jangipur.)
Last election	36.59%, 143 seats	30.66%, 60 seats	7.98%, 26 seats
Seats won	176	30	21
Seat change	▲33	▼30	▼5
Popular vote	14,652,200	10,512,153	5,805,398
Percentage	37.13%	26.64%	14.71%
Swing	▲0.54 pp	▼4.02 pp	▲6.73 pp
Alliance seats	235	31	26
Seat change	▲36	▼29	▼3

- Structure of the West Bengal Legislative Assembly after the election
Chief Minister before election
Buddhadeb Bhattacharjee
CPI(M)
Elected Chief Minister
Buddhadeb Bhattacharjee
CPI(M)

Assembly elections were held in the Indian state of West Bengal to elect the members of West Bengal Legislative Assembly. The election took place in five phases between 17 April and 8 May. The votes were counted three days later on May 11, 2006, and thanks to the electronic voting machines, all the results were out by the end of the day.

The Communist Party of India (Marxist)-led Left Front won the election with an overwhelming majority. The previous government, formed by the Left Front and led by chief minister Buddhadeb Bhattacharjee, completed its full five-year term in office following its coming to power in 2001. The Left Front had been ruling the state of West Bengal for the last three decades, the world's longest-running democratically elected Communist government.

== Election schedule ==
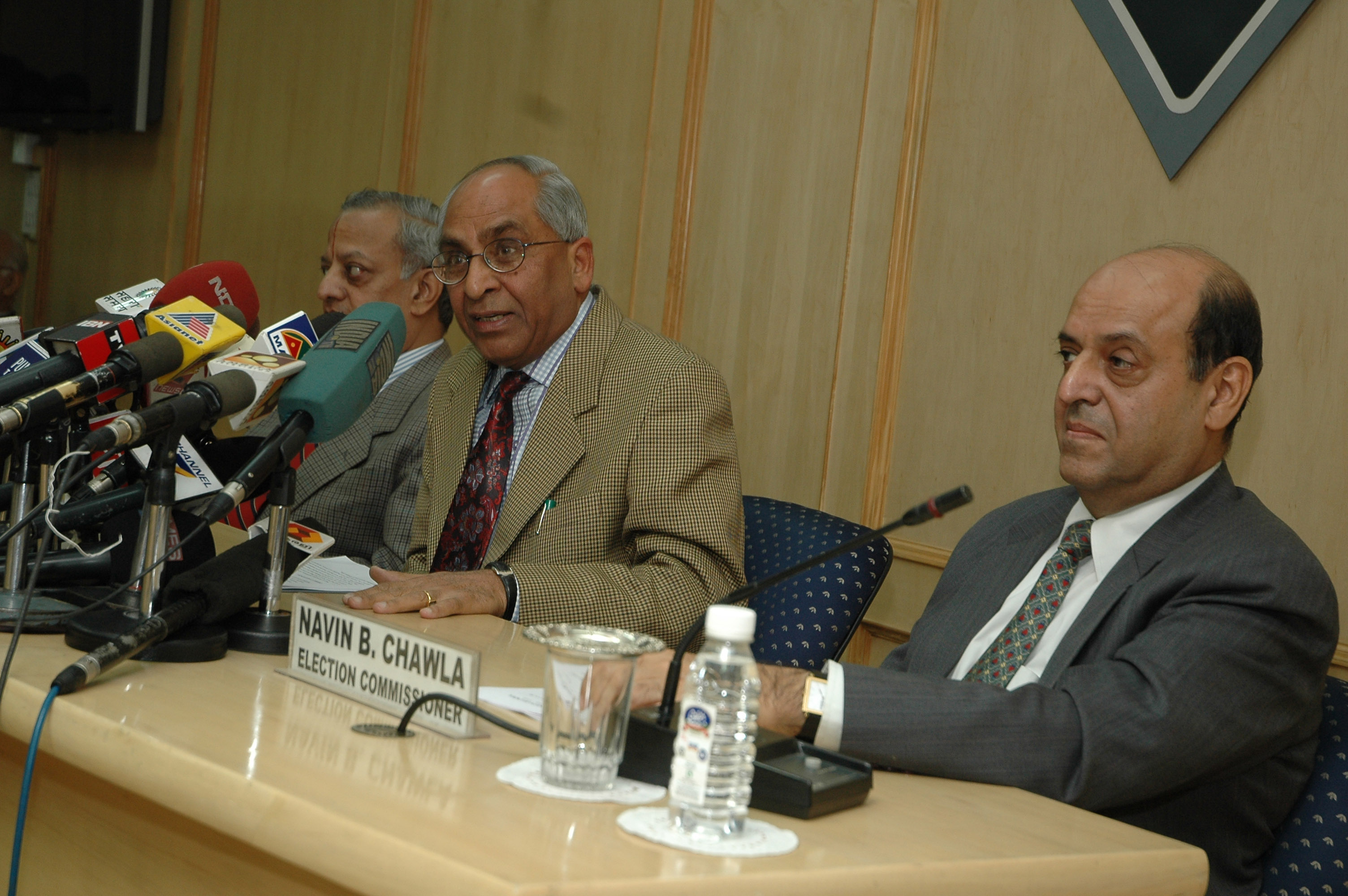
The Chief Election Commissioner of India, B.B. Tandon, holding a press conference in New Delhi on March 1, 2006, to announce the schedule for Legislative Assembly election of West Bengal along with those of Assam, Kerala, Tamil Nadu, and Puducherry.

Poll event	First phase	Second phase	Third phase	Fourth phase	Fifth phase
Notification Date	24 March	28 March	1 April	5 April	13 April
Last Date for filing nomination	31 March	4 April	8 April	12 April	20 April
Scrutiny of nomination	1 April	5 April	10 April	13 April	21 April
Last Date for withdrawal of nomination	3 April	7 April	12 April	17 April	24 May
Date of poll	17 April	22 April	27 April	3 May	8 May
Date of counting of votes	11 May				
No. of assembly constituencies	45	66	77	57	49

== Parties and alliances ==
=== Left Front ===
Party	Flag	Symbol	Leader	Contesting Seats	
Communist Party of India (Marxist)			Buddhadeb Bhattacharya	210	216
Democratic Socialist Party (Prabodh Chandra)			Prabodh Chandra Sinha	2	216
Marxist Forward Bloc			Pratim Chatterjee	2	216
Biplobi Bangla Congress				1	216
Revolutionary Communist Party of India			Rasik Bhatt	1	216
All India Forward Bloc			Debabrata Biswas	34	
Revolutionary Socialist Party			Kshiti Goswami	23	
Communist Party of India			Swapan Banerjee	13	
West Bengal Socialist Party			Kiranmoy Nanda	4	
Nationalist Congress Party			P. A. Sangma	2	
Rashtriya Janata Dal			Lalu Prasad Yadav	2	
Total				294	

=== National Democratic Alliance ===
Party	Flag	Symbol	Leader	Contesting Seats
Trinamool Congress			Mamata Banerjee	257
Bharatiya Janata Party			Rahul Sinha	29
Jharkhand Party (Naren)			Chunibala Hansda	4
Janata Dal (United)			Nitish Kumar	2
Independent				4
Total				294+2 (Note: Friendly Contest on Raipur and Purulia between JKP(N) and AITC.)

=== United Progressive Alliance ===
Party	Flag	Symbol	Leader	Contesting Seats
Indian National Congress			Pranab Mukherjee	262
Party for Democratic Socialism			Saifuddin Choudhury	12
Lok Janshakti Party			Ram Vilas Paswan	8
Jharkhand Mukti Morcha			Shibu Soren	7
Gorkha National Liberation Front				5
Indian People's Forward Bloc				3
Republican Party of India (Athawale)			Ramdas Athawale	1
Independent				4
Total				294+8 (Note: Friendly Contest on Labhpur, Narghat, Hura and Murshidabad between PDS and INC, JMM, IPFB respectively.) (Note: Friendly Contest on Siliguri and Phansidewa between GNLF and INC respectively.) (Note: Friendly Contest on Arsa and Memari between JMM and INC respectively.)

== Results ==
The Communist Party of India (Marxist) led Left Front won a landslide victory by winning a total of 235 seats

Source: Indian elections

=== Alliance wise result ===
LF	SEATS	%	NDA	SEATS	%	UPA	SEATS	%
CPIM	176	37.13	AITC	30	26.64	INC	21	14.71
AIFB	23	5.66	JKP(N)	1	0.26	GNLF	3	
RSP	20	3.71	BJP	0	1.93	IND(INC)	2	
CPI	8	1.91	JD(U)	0	0.10	JMM	0	
WBSP	4	0.71				LJP	0	
RJD	1	0.08				PDS	0	
DSP(P)	1	0.36				BSP	0	
NCP	0	0.19				IPFB	0	
Independent (MFB)	2	0.43						
TOTAL (2006)	235	50.18	TOTAL (2006)	31	28.93	TOTAL (2006)	26	
TOTAL (2001)	199		TOTAL (2001)	60		TOTAL (2001)	29	

=== Party wise result ===
Party	Candidates Contested	Seats Won	
Communist Party of India (Marxist)	212	176	
Indian National Congress	262	21	
Communist Party of India	13	8	
Bahujan Samaj Party	128	0	
Bharatiya Janata Party	29	0	
Nationalist Congress Party	2	0	
All India Trinamool Congress	257	30	
All India Forward Bloc	34	23	
Revolutionary Socialist Party	23	20	
Samajwadi Party	32	0	
Rashtriya Janata Dal	2	1	
Communist Party of India (Marxist-Leninist) Liberation	25	0	
Lok Jan Shakti Party	8	0	
Jharkhand Mukti Morcha	7	0	
Janata Dal (Secular)	6	0	
Indian Union Muslim League	6	0	
Shiv Sena	3	0	
Janata Dal (United)	2	0	
West Bengal Socialist Party	4	4	
Gorkha National Liberation Front	5	3	
Jharkhand Party (Naren)	4	1	
Democratic Socialist Party (Prabodh Chandra)	2	1	
Amra Bangalee	22	0	
Party for Democratic Socialism	12	0	
Jharkhand Disom Party	10	0	
Indian Justice Party	6	0	
Indian People's Forward Bloc	3	0	
Paschim Banga Rajya Muslim League	2	0	
Samajtantric Party of India	2	0	
Jana Unnayan Mancha	1	0	
Social Justice Party	1	0	
Shoshit Samaj Party	1	0	
Republican Party of India (Athvale)	1	0	
Rashtriya Samadhaan Party	1	0	
Independent	526	6	Independent includes MFB 2, SUCI 2

Total Number of constituencies : 294
Results declared : 294
Total contestants : 1654

== Constituency-Wise Results ==
Constituency		Winner				Runner Up				Margin	%
#	Name	Candidate	Party	Votes	%	Candidate	Party	Votes	%	Margin	%
1	Mekliganj	Paresh Adhikary	AIFB	67,491	46.79	Sunil Chandra Roy	AITC	39,490	27.38	28,001	19.41
2	Sitalkuchi	Harish Chandra Barman	CPM	75,093	52.74	Lalit Chandra Pramanik	AITC	56,226	39.49	18,867	13.25
3	Mathabhanga	Ananta Roy	CPM	78,033	54.92	Hem Chandra Barman	BJP	50,033	35.21	28,000	19.71
4	Cooch Behar North	Dipak Chandra Sarkar	AIFB	67,997	48.37	Mihir Goswami	AITC	36,325	25.84	31,672	22.53
5	Cooch Behar West	Akshay Thakur	AIFB	79,273	51.07	Abdul Jalil Ahmed	AITC	52,587	33.88	26,686	17.19
6	Sitai	Dr. Md. Fazle Haque	INC	72,184	47.30	Nripendra Nath Roy	AIFB	67,289	44.09	4,895	3.21
7	Dinhata	Ashok Mandal	AITC	66,774	45.55	Udayan Guha	AIFB	63,144	43.07	3,630	2.48
8	Natabari	Tamser Ali	CPM	67,845	48.84	Rabindra Nath Ghosh	AITC	63,009	45.36	4,836	3.48
9	Tufanganj	Alaka Barman	CPM	74,243	54.58	Malati Rava	BJP	49,026	36.04	25,217	18.54
10	Kumargram	Dasrath Tirkey	RSP	69,540	53.92	Swapan Kujur	AITC	32,372	25.10	37,168	28.82
11	Kalchini	Manohar Tirkey	RSP	52,748	46.09	Paban Kumar Lakra	INC	47,759	41.73	4,989	4.36
12	Alipurduars	Nirmal Das	RSP	72,394	49.97	Sourav Chakroborty	INC	33,526	23.14	38,868	26.83
13	Falakata	Jogesh Ch. Barman	CPM	69,910	50.99	Anil Adhikari	AITC	56,596	41.28	13,314	9.71
14	Madarihat	Kumari Kujur	RSP	47,331	40.96	Atul Suba	INC	28,565	24.72	18,766	16.24
15	Dhupguri	Lakshmi Kanta Roy	CPM	66,040	49.29	Ashok Kumar Barman	AITC	49,175	36.70	16,865	12.59
16	Nagrakata	Sukhmoith Oraon	CPM	62,676	47.32	Shankar Baraik	INC	40,934	30.91	21,742	16.41
17	Mainaguri	Bachchamohan Roy	RSP	72,090	53.51	Gokul Kumar Roy	BJP	24,704	18.34	47,386	35.17
18	Mal	Somra Lakra	CPM	56,564	48.43	Turi Kol Munda	INC	46,608	39.90	9,956	8.53
19	Kranti	Fazlul Karim	CPM	63,153	53.79	Atul Roy	IND	19,974	17.01	43,179	36.78
20	Jalpaiguri	Deba Prasad Roy	INC	54,051	44.57	Gobinda Roy	AIFB	53,033	43.73	1,018	0.84
21	Rajganj	Mahendra Kumar Roy	CPM	1,09,548	51.67	Khageswar Roy	AITC	60,076	28.34	49,472	23.33
22	Kalimpong Kurseong	Gaulan Lepcha	GNLF	57,854	56.32	Norden Lama	IND	32,043	31.19	25,811	25.13
23	Darjeeling	Pranay Rai	GNLF	58,646	52.97	Amar Lama	IND	36,636	33.09	22,010	19.88
24	Siliguri	Shanta Chhetri	GNLF	63,295	53.56	Buddhiman Rai	IND	30,237	25.59	33,058	27.97
25	Siliguri	Asok Bhattacharya	CPM	1,17,943	55.44	Nantu Paul	INC	42,972	20.20	74,971	35.24
26	Phansidewa	Kisku Chhotan	CPM	93,689	50.22	Mamla Kujur	INC	58,185	31.19	35,504	19.03
27	Chopra	Anwarul Haque	CPM	69,663	50.96	Hamidul Rahaman	INC	62,065	45.40	7,598	5.56
28	Islampur	Md. Faruque	CPM	55,240	45.21	Abdul Karim Chowdhary	AITC	47,828	39.14	7,412	6.07
29	Goalpokhar	Deepa Dasmunsi	INC	63,784	49.68	Hafiz Alam Sairani	AIFB	55,474	43.21	8,310	6.47
30	Karandighi	Gokul Roy	AIFB	71,430	45.07	Hazi Sajjad Hussain	INC	66,995	42.27	4,435	2.80
31	Raiganj	Chitta Ranjan Ray	INC	77,789	46.70	Dilip Kumar Das	NCP	62,029	37.24	15,760	9.46
32	Kaliaganj	Nani Gopal Roy	CPM	69,626	44.97	Pramatha Nath Ray	INC	67,344	43.49	2,282	1.48
33	Kushmandi	Narmada Chandra Roy	RSP	66,131	46.86	Rajib Lochan Sarkar	INC	43,915	31.12	22,216	15.74
34	Itahar	Srikumar Mukherjee	CPI	66,768	46.09	Amal Acharjee	INC	66,028	45.58	740	0.51
35	Gangarampur	Narayan Biswas	CPM	90,393	52.20	Biplab Mitra	AITC	69,576	40.18	20,817	12.02
36	Tapan	Khara Soren	RSP	74,414	56.77	Columbus Tirki	BJP	29,592	22.57	44,822	34.20
37	Kumarganj	Mafuja Khatun	CPM	75,769	48.73	Ahmad Ali Sardar	AITC	65,133	41.89	10,636	6.84
38	Balurghat	Biswanath Choudhury	RSP	57,150	46.17	Choudhuri Debasree	BJP	48,895	39.50	8,255	6.67
39	Habibpur	Khagen Murmu	CPM	56,477	45.67	Ramlal Hansda	BJP	47,283	38.24	9,194	7.43
40	Gajol	Sadhu Tudu	CPM	68,942	51.43	Jatin Hansda	INC	33,847	25.25	35,095	26.18
41	Khabra	Mahabubul Haque	INC	66,877	50.63	Anjumanara	CPM	56,690	42.92	10,187	7.71
42	Harishchandrapur	Tajmul Hossain	AIFB	62,021	46.68	Alam Mostaque	INC	60,019	45.17	2,002	1.51
43	Ratua	Sailen Sarkar	CPM	54,620	48.37	Asit Bose	INC	49,587	43.92	5,033	4.45
44	Araidanga	Sabitri Mitra	INC	58,856	49.46	Sadiqul Islam	CPM	54,576	45.86	4,280	3.60
45	Malda	Subhendu Chowdhury	CPM	63,654	41.05	Bhupendra Nath Halder	INC	52,318	33.74	11,336	7.31
46	Englishbazar	Krishnendu Choudhury	INC	67,576	46.26	Samar Roy	CPM	66,670	45.64	906	0.62
47	Manikchak	Asima Chaudhuri	CPM	45,660	44.29	Ram Prabesh Mandal	INC	40,196	38.99	5,464	5.30
48	Suzapur	Rubi Noor	INC	62,869	53.56	Hamidur Rahman	CPM	45,229	38.53	17,640	15.03
49	Kaliachak	Biswanath Ghosh	CPM	70,766	46.91	Abu Hasem Khan Ch.	INC	68,789	45.59	1,977	1.32
50	Farakka	Mainul Haque	INC	59,682	49.05	Abdus Salam	CPM	53,142	43.68	6,540	5.37
51	Aurangabad	Touab Ali	CPM	63,407	45.99	Humayun Reza	INC	61,041	44.27	2,366	1.72
52	Suti	Jane Alam Mian	RSP	61,605	46.90	Md. Sohrab	INC	56,272	42.84	5,333	4.06
53	Sagardighi (SC)	Parikshit Let	CPM	62,983	48.62	Rajesh Kumar Bhakat	INC	56,920	43.94	6,063	4.68
54	Jangipur	Abul Hasnat	RSP	61,526	48.85	Habibur Rahaman	INC	48,029	38.13	13,497	10.72
55	Lalgola	Abu Hena	INC	69,538	49.24	Jinnatunnesa Begam	CPM	63,201	44.75	6,337	4.49
56	Bhagabangola	Chand Mohammad	WBSP	60,889	46.47	Abu Sufian Sarkar	INC	51,424	39.24	9,465	7.23
57	Nabagram	Mukul Mondal	CPM	74,594	52.38	Rathin Ghosh	INC	52,018	36.53	22,576	15.85
58	Murshidabad	Bivas Chakraborty	AIFB	82,312	48.98	Joyanta Roy	IPFB	69,014	41.07	13,298	7.91
59	Jalangi	Unus Sarkar	CPM	84,109	51.16	Subrata Saha	INC	71,822	43.68	12,287	7.48
60	Domkal	Anisur Rahaman	CPM	86,079	51.88	Rejaul Karim (Manik)	INC	76,485	46.10	9,594	5.78
61	Naoda	Abu Taher Khan	INC	74,192	47.97	Jayanta Kumar Biswas	RSP	72,860	47.10	1,332	0.87
62	Hariharpara	Insar Ali Biswas	CPM	68,862	45.14	Niamot Sheikh	INC	68,765	45.08	97	0.06
63	Berhampore	Manoj Chakraborty	IND	94,562	50.55	Amal Karmakar	RSP	68,836	36.80	25,726	13.75
64	Beldanga	Refatullah Md.	RSP	66,527	46.28	Golam Kibria Mia	INC	65,017	45.23	1,510	1.05
65	Kandi	Apurba Sarkar (David)	IND	50,157	34.87	Abdul Hamid	CPI	47,525	33.04	2,632	1.83
66	Khargram (SC)	Manabendranath Saha	CPM	66,736	49.11	Ashis Marjit	INC	61,335	45.13	5,401	3.98
67	Barwan	Biswa Nath Banerjee	RSP	61,311	48.01	Arit Majumder	INC	57,058	44.68	4,253	3.33
68	Bharatpur	Id Mohammad	RSP	63,621	49.55	Afzal Hossain Khan	INC	56,289	43.84	7,332	5.71
69	Karimpur	Prafulla Kumar Bhowmick	CPM	74,036	47.18	Arabinda Mandal	INC	54,161	34.51	19,875	12.67
70	Palashipara	Biswanath Ghosh	CPM	70,740	48.20	Saha Tapas Kumar	AITC	38,375	26.15	32,365	22.05
71	Nakashipara	Kallol Khan	AITC	63,505	45.36	S. M. Sadi	CPM	63,095	45.06	410	0.30
72	Kaliganj	Dhananjoy Modak	RSP	57,006	43.26	Nasiruddin Ahmed (Lal)	AITC	53,245	40.41	3,761	2.85
73	Chapra	Shamsul Islam Mollah	CPM	73,290	47.76	Abdur Rashid Mollick	INC	46,992	30.62	26,298	17.14
74	Krishnaganj (SC)	Binay Krishna Biswas	CPM	64,391	46.79	Sushil Biswas	AITC	59,353	43.13	5,038	3.66
75	Krishnanagar East	Ghosh Subinay (Bhajan)	CPM	69,380	44.93	Dr. Ramendra Nath Sarkar	AITC	68,823	44.57	557	0.36
76	Krishnagar West	Asoke Banerjee	CPM	64,743	48.80	Ujjal Biswas	AITC	53,514	40.34	11,229	8.46
77	Nabadwip	Pundarikakshya Saha	AITC	67,745	51.10	Chhaya Sen Sarma	CPM	58,373	44.03	9,372	7.07
78	Shantipur	Ajoy Dey	INC	89,834	47.78	Santanu Chakrabarti	CPM	87,721	46.66	2,113	1.12
79	Hanskhali (SC)	Nayan Sarkar	CPM	84,328	47.86	Dr. Ramendra Nath Biswas	AITC	81,307	46.15	3,021	1.71
80	Ranaghat East (SC)	Debendra Nath Biswas	CPM	98,559	50.33	Nilima Nag (Mallick)	AITC	88,446	45.17	10,113	5.16
81	Ranaghat West	Aloke Kumar Das	CPM	76,109	42.58	Shankar Singha	INC	75,928	42.48	181	0.10
82	Chakdaha	Malay Kumar Samanta	CPM	1,09,670	55.17	Naresh Chandra Chaki	AITC	77,801	39.14	31,869	16.03
83	Haringhata	Bankim Chandra Ghosh	CPM	95,524	51.90	Dipak Basu	AITC	68,058	36.98	27,466	14.92
84	Bagdaha (SC)	Dulal Bar	AITC	79,896	49.77	Kamalakshi Biswas	AIFB	74,991	46.71	4,905	3.06
85	Bongaon	Bhupendra Nath Seth	AITC	86,213	49.30	Pankaj Ghosh	CPM	82,748	47.32	3,465	1.98
86	Gaighata	Jyoti Priya Mallick	AITC	93,811	48.27	Monmatha Roy	CPM	88,992	45.79	4,819	2.48
87	Habra	Pranab Kumar Bhattacharyya	CPM	79,166	46.10	Tapati Datta	AITC	51,071	29.74	28,095	16.36
88	Ashokenagar	Satyasebi Kar	CPM	73,250	46.08	Dhiman Roy	AITC	71,450	44.94	1,800	1.14
89	Amdanga	Abdus Sattar	CPM	77,923	48.53	Rafiquer Rahaman	AITC	69,023	42.98	8,900	5.55
90	Barasat	Dr. Bithika Mondal	AIFB	1,24,664	46.76	Ashoke Mukherjee (Gopal)	AITC	1,18,077	44.29	6,587	2.47
91	Rajarhat (SC)	Rabindranath Mandal	CPM	1,18,430	50.26	Tanmoy Mondal	AITC	1,01,621	43.12	16,809	7.14
92	Deganga	Dr. Mortoza Hossain	AIFB	61,864	47.38	Mafidul Haque Sahaji	AITC	50,327	38.55	11,537	8.83
93	Swarupnagar	Mostafa Bin Quasem	CPM	67,889	46.68	Narayan Goswami	AITC	61,337	42.18	6,552	4.50
94	Baduria	Md. Shelim Gain	CPM	63,456	45.62	Abdul Gaffar Kazi	INC	63,289	45.50	167	0.12
95	Basirhat	Narayan Mukherjee	CPM	66,993	41.90	Asit Majumdar	INC	65,727	41.11	1,266	0.79
96	Hasnabad	Goutam Deb	CPM	57,994	47.35	Islam Rafikul Mondal	AITC	41,385	33.79	16,609	13.56
97	Haroa (SC)	Asim Kumar Das	CPM	80,322	55.43	Mrityunjoy Mondal	AITC	47,798	32.99	32,524	22.44
98	Sandeshkhali (SC)	Abani Roy	CPM	69,859	53.97	Gita Mondal	AITC	49,867	38.52	19,992	15.45
99	Hingalganj (SC)	Gopal Gayen	CPM	66,171	51.42	Debes Mandal	AITC	54,098	42.04	12,073	9.38
100	Gosaba (SC)	Chitta Ranjan Mandal	RSP	57,594	48.69	Jayanta Naskar	AITC	51,110	43.21	6,484	5.48
101	Basanti (SC)	Subhas Naskar	RSP	88,857	66.34	Amal Kanti Ray	BJP	36,256	27.07	52,601	39.27
102	Kultali (SC)	Joykrishna Halder (Note: SUCI candidate contested as Independent)	IND	67,664	47.86	Ramsankar Halder	CPM	66,860	47.29	804	0.57
103	Joynagar	Debaprasad Sarkar	IND	59,749	45.64	Asish Ghosh	CPM	46,263	35.34	13,486	10.30
104	Baruipur	Rahul Ghosh	CPM	80,540	47.34	Arup Bhadra	AITC	76,633	45.05	3,907	2.29
105	Canning West (SC)	Dwijapada Mondol	CPM	64,749	41.69	Gobinda Chandra Naskar	AITC	63,303	40.76	1,446	0.93
106	Canning East	Abdur Razzak Molla	CPM	70,725	57.56	Amirul Islam	AITC	40,176	32.70	30,549	24.86
107	Bhangar	Arabul Islam	AITC	71,990	48.07	Mosharaf Hossain Laskar	CPM	69,000	46.08	2,990	1.99
108	Jadavpur	Buddhadeb Bhattacharjee	CPM	1,27,837	61.25	Dipak Kumar Ghosh	AITC	69,707	33.40	58,130	27.85
109	Sonarpur (SC)	Shyamal Naskar	CPM	1,13,146	48.65	Nirmal Ch. Mandal	AITC	1,05,126	45.20	8,020	3.45
110	Bishnupur East (SC)	Ananda Kumar Biswas	CPM	59,099	50.30	Dilip Mondal	AITC	52,786	44.92	6,313	5.38
111	Bishnupur West	Rathin Sarkar	CPM	60,913	44.37	Madan Mitra	AITC	56,653	41.26	4,260	3.11
112	Behala East	Kumkum Chakraborti	CPM	1,03,421	51.17	Sovan Chatterjee	AITC	77,526	38.36	25,895	12.81
113	Behala West	Partha Chatterjee	AITC	82,259	48.84	Niranjan Chatterjee	CPM	76,532	45.44	5,727	3.40
114	Garden Reach	Abdul Khaleque Molla	INC	45,557	48.42	Amin Mohammed	CPM	36,683	38.99	8,874	9.43
115	Maheshtala	Mursalin Molla	CPM	65,691	49.99	Dulal Das	INC	37,835	28.79	27,856	21.20
116	Budge Budge	Ashok Kumar Deb	AITC	72,889	57.10	Ratan Bagchi	CPM	47,780	37.43	25,109	19.67
117	Satgachia	Sonali Guha (Bose)	AITC	64,322	48.01	Kabita Kayal	CPM	57,526	42.94	6,796	5.07
118	Falta	Chandana Ghoshdostidar	CPM	51,814	45.70	Tamonash Ghosh	AITC	50,060	44.16	1,754	1.54
119	Diamond Harbour	Rishi Halder	CPM	64,005	47.50	Subhashis Chakraborty	AITC	58,789	43.62	5,216	3.88
120	Magrahat West	Dr. Abul Hasnat	CPM	59,274	50.43	Giasuddin Molla	AITC	38,049	32.37	21,225	18.06
121	Magrahat East (SC)	Bansari Mohan Kanji	CPM	66,996	50.47	Nomita Saha	AITC	46,676	35.17	20,320	15.30
122	Mandirbazar (SC)	Dr. Tapati Saha	CPM	63,751	47.91	Choudhury Mohan Jatua	AITC	62,399	46.89	1,352	1.02
123	Mathurapur	Kanti Ganguly	CPM	74,657	49.45	Saytaranjan Bapuli	AITC	66,926	44.33	7,731	5.12
124	Kulpi (SC)	Sakuntala Paik	CPM	51,680	45.83	Jagaranjan Haldar	AITC	49,888	44.24	1,792	1.59
125	Patharpratima	Jajneswar Das	CPM	60,812	46.91	Samir Kumar Jana	AITC	51,371	39.62	9,441	7.29
126	Kakdwip	Ashok Giri	CPM	65,749	49.44	Manturam Pakhira	AITC	57,333	43.11	8,416	6.33
127	Sagar	Milan Parua	CPM	79,764	49.45	Bankim Chandra Hazra	AITC	71,451	44.29	8,313	5.16
128	Bijpur	Dr. Nirjharini Chakrabarty	CPM	57,715	52.66	Kalyani Biswas (Basu)	AITC	39,930	36.43	17,785	16.23
129	Naihati	Ranjit Kundu	CPM	61,274	49.00	Dhillon Sarkar	AITC	51,390	41.10	9,884	7.90
130	Bhatpara	Arjun Sing	AITC	50,368	61.48	Harimohan Nath	CPM	21,692	26.48	28,676	35.00
131	Jagatdal	Haripada Biswas	AIFB	64,536	47.39	Rahul (Biswajit) Sinha	BJP	54,796	40.23	9,740	7.16
132	Noapara	Kusadhwaj Ghosh	CPM	44,550	47.73	Manju Basu	AITC	40,043	42.89	4,507	4.84
133	Titagarh	Dr. Pravin Kumar	CPM	32,331	43.00	Meena Ghosh	AITC	31,515	41.92	816	1.08
134	Khardah	Asim Kumar Dasgupta	CPM	1,02,995	56.58	Mahadeb Basak	BJP	60,690	33.34	42,305	23.24
135	Panihati	Gopal Krishna Bhattacharyya	CPM	75,466	48.05	Nirmal Ghosh	AITC	71,620	45.60	3,846	2.45
136	Kamarhati	Manash Mukherjee	CPM	71,322	56.40	Subhrangshu Bhattacharya	AITC	40,634	32.13	30,688	24.27
137	Baranagar	Amar Chowdhury	RSP	85,584	51.44	Atin Ghosh	AITC	67,428	40.53	18,156	10.91
138	Dum Dum	Rekha Goswami	CPM	99,054	53.96	Udayan Namboodiry	AITC	68,816	37.49	30,238	16.47
139	Belgachia East	Subhas Chakraborti	CPM	91,273	46.41	Sujit Bose	AITC	89,524	45.52	1,749	0.89
140	Cossipur	Bandyopadhyay Tarak	AITC	26,150	43.15	Salil Chatterjee	CPM	24,514	40.45	1,636	2.70
141	Shyampukur	Jiban Prakash Saha	AIFB	26,382	52.53	Samik Bhattacharya	BJP	16,304	32.46	10,078	20.07
142	Jorabagan	Parimal Biswas	CPM	21,739	48.62	Sanjoy Bakshi	AITC	15,030	33.62	6,709	15.00
143	Jorasanko	Dinesh Bajaj	AITC	14,162	41.24	Shyam Sundar Gupta	AIFB	13,343	38.85	819	2.39
144	Bara Bazar	Md. Sohrab	RJD	9,527	34.32	Amitabha Chakraborty	INC	8,760	31.55	767	2.77
145	Bow Bazar	Sudip Bandyopadhyay	INC	21,451	40.30	Rekha Singh	CPM	15,309	28.76	6,142	11.54
146	Chowringhee	Subrata Bakshi	AITC	23,000	38.19	Narayan Jain	CPM	20,790	34.52	2,210	3.67
147	Kabitirtha	Ram Pyare Ram	INC	40,280	50.48	Moinuddin Shams	AIFB	30,923	38.75	9,357	11.73
148	Alipore	Tapas Paul	AITC	37,440	52.18	Biplab Chatterjee	CPM	26,138	36.43	11,302	15.75
149	Rashbehari Avenue	Sobhandeb Chattopadhyay	AITC	34,800	54.50	Mala Roy	INC	12,917	20.23	21,883	34.27
150	Tollygunge	Aroop Biswas	AITC	46,378	46.67	Partha Pratim Biswas	CPM	45,852	46.14	526	0.53
151	Dhakuria	Kshiti Goswami	RSP	57,669	47.73	Sougata Roy	AITC	56,582	46.83	1,087	0.90
152	Ballygunge	Ahmed Javed Khan	AITC	59,693	48.21	Rabin Deb	CPM	53,242	43.00	6,451	5.21
153	Entally	Hashim Abdul Halim	CPM	38,934	49.59	Khalid Ebadullah	INC	19,633	25.01	19,301	24.58
154	Taltola (SC)	Debesh Das	CPM	39,618	49.33	Sumanta Kumar Hira	AITC	25,129	31.29	14,489	18.04
155	Beliaghata	Manabendra Mukherjee	CPM	48,251	53.01	Ashim Chatterjee	AITC	31,876	35.02	16,375	17.99
156	Sealdah	Somendra Nath Mitra	INC	23,011	58.53	Prabir Deb	CPI	10,252	26.08	12,759	32.45
157	Vidyasagar	Anadi Kumar Sahu	CPM	28,992	49.69	Pryal Chaudhury	INC	14,416	24.71	14,576	24.98
158	Burtola	Sadhan Pande	AITC	36,581	54.55	Kalyan Mukherjee	RSP	21,863	32.60	14,718	21.95
159	Manicktola	Rupa Bagchi	CPM	53,908	47.83	Paresh Paul	AITC	52,523	46.60	1,385	1.23
160	Belgachia West	Mala Saha	AITC	37,711	45.89	Rajdeo Gowala	CPM	37,173	45.24	538	0.65
161	Bally	Kanika Ganguly	CPM	54,262	59.21	Rekha Raut	AITC	24,737	26.99	29,525	32.22
162	Howrah North	Lagan Deo Singh	CPM	52,361	53.80	Bani Singha Roy	AITC	21,459	22.05	30,902	31.75
163	Howrah Central	Arup Ray (Tukun)	CPM	35,657	42.29	Ambica Banerjee	AITC	28,988	34.38	6,669	7.91
164	Howrah South	Krishna Kisor Ray	CPM	40,493	48.06	Amitava Datta	JD(U)	17,487	20.75	23,006	27.31
165	Shibpur	Dr. Jagannath Bhattacharyya	AIFB	92,894	46.39	Jatu Lahiri	AITC	83,335	41.62	9,559	4.77
166	Domjur	Mohanta Chatterjee	CPM	1,01,015	53.45	Rajib Banerjee	AITC	70,106	37.09	30,909	16.36
167	Jagatballavpur	Biplab Majumdar	CPM	72,161	48.76	Biman Chakraborti	AITC	60,752	41.05	11,409	7.71
168	Panchla	Doli Roy	AIFB	64,274	47.80	Abul Kasem Molla	AITC	38,771	28.83	25,503	18.97
169	Sankrail (SC)	Sital Kumar Sardar	AITC	66,551	44.76	Anirban Hazra	CPM	66,438	44.68	113	0.08
170	Uluberia North (SC)	Mohan Mondal	CPM	62,896	48.90	Gopal Dolui	AITC	45,283	35.21	17,613	13.69
171	Uluberia South	Rabindra Ghosh	AIFB	57,699	42.71	Pulak Roy	AITC	55,688	41.23	2,011	1.48
172	Shyampur	Kali Pada Mandal	AITC	66,654	48.08	Asit Baran Sau	AIFB	62,913	45.38	3,741	2.70
173	Bagnan	Akkel Ali Khan	CPM	63,327	45.13	Arup Roy	AITC	44,966	32.04	18,361	13.09
174	Kalyanpur	Rabindra Nath Mitra	CPM	58,408	48.39	Asit Mitra	INC	54,320	45.01	4,088	3.38
175	Amta	Pratyush Mukherjee	CPM	64,924	51.87	Ashok Maji	AITC	53,257	42.55	11,667	9.32
176	Udaynarayanpur	Chandra Lekha Bag	CPM	62,943	49.91	Samir Kumar Panja	AITC	38,665	30.66	24,278	19.25
177	Jangipara	Sudarsan Raychaudhuri	CPM	79,418	57.57	Ehsanul Haque Kazi	AITC	50,645	36.71	28,773	20.86
178	Chanditala	Bhaktaram Pan	CPM	83,078	51.03	Swati Khandoker	AITC	68,309	41.96	14,769	9.07
179	Uttarpara	Prof. Dr. Srutinath Praharaj	CPM	73,149	48.44	Sudipta Roy	AITC	72,264	47.86	885	0.58
180	Serampore	Dr. Ratna De (Nag)	AITC	40,133	39.74	Dhirendra Nath Das Gupta	CPI	31,958	31.65	8,175	8.09
181	Champdani	Jibesh Chakraborty	CPM	61,090	38.91	Abdul Mannan	INC	53,040	33.78	8,050	5.13
182	Chandernagore	Sibaprosad Bandyopadhyay	CPM	64,406	45.65	Ram Chakrabortty	AITC	46,816	33.18	17,590	12.47
183	Singur	Rabindranath Bhattacharjee	AITC	68,911	47.92	Srikanta Chattopadhyay	CPM	67,124	46.68	1,787	1.24
184	Haripal	Bharati Mukherjee	CPM	68,479	52.99	Safiul Islam Sarkar	AITC	49,424	38.25	19,055	14.74
185	Tarakeswar	Pratim Chatterjee (Note: MFB candidate contested as Independent)	IND	74,849	58.10	Krishna Bhattacharjee	BJP	44,578	34.60	30,271	23.50
186	Chinsurah	Naren Dey	AIFB	79,678	51.99	Ashis Sen	AITC	55,877	36.46	23,801	15.53
187	Bansberia	Ashutosh Mukhopadhyay	CPM	67,755	50.57	Suma Mukherjee	AITC	43,598	32.54	24,157	18.03
188	Balagarh (SC)	Dibakanta Routh	CPM	69,627	51.85	Asima Patra	AITC	51,662	38.47	17,965	13.38
189	Pandua	Sekh Majed Ali	CPM	90,516	60.62	Alam Kazi Rowshan	AITC	44,858	30.04	45,658	30.58
190	Polba	Shaktipada Khanra	CPM	73,959	55.85	Sk. Sahadat Ali	AITC	38,390	28.99	35,569	26.86
191	Dhaniakhali (SC)	Ajit Patra	AIFB	86,874	63.35	Jitendra Nath Sarkar	AITC	41,625	30.36	45,249	32.99
192	Pursurah	Saumendranath Bera	CPM	84,289	59.39	Sk. Parvez Rahman	AITC	49,327	34.76	34,962	24.63
193	Khanakul (SC)	Banshi Badan Maitra	CPM	83,584	57.02	Kalyani Maji	AITC	52,261	35.65	31,323	21.37
194	Arambagh	Binoy Datta	CPM	1,04,067	62.26	Bivabindu Nandi	AITC	50,324	30.11	53,743	32.15
195	Goghat (SC)	Niranjan Pandit	AIFB	1,11,228	69.76	Bishnupada Pakhira	AITC	38,027	23.85	73,201	45.91
196	Chandrakona	Gurupada Dutta	CPM	96,276	61.36	Lakshmipriya Mondal	AITC	44,735	28.51	51,541	32.85
197	Ghatal (SC)	Ratan Pakhira	CPM	80,349	59.31	Ayan Dolui	BJP	29,462	21.75	50,887	37.56
198	Daspur	Sunil Adhikari	CPM	61,298	49.32	Ajit Bhunia	AITC	58,121	46.77	3,177	2.55
199	Nandanpur	Chowdhury Chakraborty Bula	CPM	63,169	49.78	Nanda Kumar Mishra	AITC	59,311	46.74	3,858	3.04
200	Panskura West	Chittaranjan Dasthakur	CPI	77,525	57.25	Jaidul Khan	AITC	50,539	37.32	26,986	19.93
201	Panskura East	Amiya Kumar Sahoo	CPM	72,858	49.64	Biplab Ray Chowdhury	AITC	65,998	44.97	6,860	4.67
202	Tamluk	Mitra Jagannath	CPI	74,425	48.99	Chitta Ranjan Maiti	AITC	63,485	41.80	10,940	7.19
203	Moyna	Sk. Mujibur Rahman	CPM	70,544	48.95	Prafulla Kumar Barai	AITC	59,470	41.27	11,074	7.68
204	Mahishadal	Tamalika Panda Seth	CPM	65,704	48.99	Buddhadeb Bhowmik	AITC	62,672	46.73	3,032	2.26
205	Sutahata (SC)	Nityananda Bera	CPM	1,08,033	56.77	Tushar Kanti Mandal	AITC	70,754	37.18	37,279	19.59
206	Nandigram	Illias Mahammad Sk.	CPI	69,376	48.71	Sk. Supian	AITC	64,553	45.33	4,823	3.38
207	Narghat	Nanda Brahmamay	WBSP	75,212	50.16	Amiya Kanti Bhattacharya	AITC	66,602	44.42	8,610	5.74
208	Bhagabanpur	Ardhendu Maity	AITC	62,212	49.79	Gourkanti Bal	CPM	57,727	46.20	4,485	3.59
209	Khajuri (SC)	Swadesh Patra	WBSP	73,317	57.82	Dr. Partha Pratim Das	AITC	49,936	39.38	23,381	18.44
210	Contai North	Chakradhar Maikap	CPM	67,376	48.30	Jyotirmoy Kar	AITC	64,871	46.51	2,505	1.79
211	Contai South	Suvendu Adhikari	AITC	68,608	50.59	Satyendra Nath Panda	CPI	60,028	44.26	8,580	6.33
212	Ramnagar	Swadesh Ranjan Nayak	CPM	81,057	51.41	Akhil Giri	AITC	72,230	45.81	8,827	5.60
213	Egra	Adhikari Sisir Kumar	AITC	67,786	48.01	Sinha Prabodh Chandra	DSP	66,196	46.88	1,590	1.13
214	Mugberia	Kiranmay Nanda	WBSP	72,465	52.98	Kajal Barman	AITC	57,813	42.27	14,652	10.71
215	Pataspur	Kamakhya Nandan Das	CPI	72,327	50.39	Kar Tapan Kanti	AITC	65,402	45.56	6,925	4.83
216	Sabang	Manas Ranjan Bhunia	INC	68,592	49.70	Tushar Kanti Laya	CPM	62,079	44.98	6,513	4.72
217	Pingla	Rampada Samanta	DSP	74,393	57.05	Hrishikesh Dinda	AITC	44,664	34.25	29,729	22.80
218	Debra	Sk. Jahangir Karim	CPM	80,109	55.96	Mrigendra Nath Maiti	AITC	55,638	38.86	24,471	17.10
219	Keshpur (SC)	Rameswar Doloi	CPM	1,01,908	70.45	Asis Pramanik	AITC	35,742	24.71	66,166	45.74
220	Garhbeta East	Ghosh Susanta	CPM	93,599	69.80	Md. Rofique	AITC	32,175	23.99	61,424	45.81
221	Garhbeta West (SC)	Krishna Prasad Duley	CPM	88,101	63.80	Tapas Saha	BJP	33,828	24.50	54,273	39.30
222	Salbani	Khagendra Nath Mahata	CPM	67,541	54.71	Uttara Singha (Hazra)	AITC	44,797	36.28	22,744	18.43
223	Midnapore	Santosh Rana	CPI	87,629	57.37	Rama Prasad Tewary	AITC	31,055	20.33	56,574	37.04
224	Kharagpur Town	Gyan Singh Sohanpal	INC	30,528	38.68	Prem Chandra Jha	RJD	21,553	27.31	8,975	11.37
225	Kharagpur Rural	Haque Nazmul	CPM	77,775	53.96	Ajit Maity	AITC	44,124	30.61	33,651	23.35
226	Keshiari (ST)	Maheswar Murmu	CPM	88,763	63.46	Shyam Charan Mandi	AITC	34,903	24.96	53,860	38.50
227	Narayangarh	Surjya Kanta Mishra	CPM	85,930	56.68	Salil Das Pattanayak	AITC	49,023	32.34	36,907	24.34
228	Dantan	Nanda Gopal Bhattacharjee	CPI	83,149	60.44	Bikram Chandra Pradhan	AITC	46,285	33.65	36,864	26.79
229	Nayagram (ST)	Bhutnath Saren	CPM	65,495	60.83	Shunaram Mahali	AITC	21,120	19.62	44,375	41.21
230	Gopiballavpur	Rabi Lal Maitra	CPM	78,953	63.33	Swapan Patra	AITC	27,488	22.05	51,465	41.28
231	Jhargram	Amar Basu	CPM	74,300	54.82	Shivendra Bijoy Malladeb	INC	34,299	25.31	40,001	29.51
232	Binpur (ST)	Chunibala Hansda	JP(N)	54,149	47.87	Sambhu Nath Mandi	CPM	48,389	42.78	5,760	5.09
233	Banduan (ST)	Upendra Nath Hansda	CPM	55,486	54.10	Kamala Kanta Mandi	BJP	24,842	24.22	30,644	29.88
234	Manbazar	Samya Pyari Mahato	CPM	56,739	49.51	Kamakshya Prasad Deo	AITC	48,035	41.91	8,704	7.60
235	Balrampur (ST)	Bhandu Majhi	CPM	57,094	55.53	Barjuram Singh Sardar	AITC	31,193	30.34	25,901	25.19
236	Arsa	Prabhat Mahato	AIFB	51,379	47.15	Bibhuti Bhusan Mahato	INC	20,469	18.78	30,910	28.37
237	Jhalda	Nepal Mahata	INC	59,594	51.48	Ashim Singha	AIFB	41,535	35.88	18,059	15.60
238	Jaipur	Bindeswar Mahato	AIFB	54,427	46.53	Shantiram Mahato	INC	52,188	44.62	2,239	1.91
239	Purulia	Nikhil Mukherjee	CPM	62,854	50.03	Dr. Sukumar Roy	INC	46,852	37.29	16,002	12.74
240	Para (SC)	Bilasibala Sahis	CPM	62,165	52.65	Sima Bauri	AITC	26,890	22.77	35,275	29.88
241	Raghunathpur (SC)	Uma Rani Bouri	CPM	52,027	53.02	Purna Chandra Bouri	AITC	29,232	29.79	22,795	23.23
242	Kashipur (ST)	Rabindra Nath Hembram	CPM	56,208	56.08	Anath Bandhu Patar	AITC	29,362	29.29	26,846	26.79
243	Hura	Subhas Chandra Mahata	CPM	53,566	48.92	Baghambar Mahato	AITC	31,476	28.75	22,090	20.17
244	Taldangra	Manoranjan Patra	CPM	82,991	61.26	Manik Mitra	AITC	32,632	24.09	50,359	37.17
245	Raipur (ST)	Upen Kisku	CPM	72,397	54.72	Bibhabati Tudu	AITC	46,496	35.15	25,901	19.57
246	Ranibandh (ST)	Deblina Hembram	CPM	52,827	45.35	Aditya Kisku	JP(N)	41,937	36.00	10,890	9.35
247	Indpur (SC)	Indrajit Tangi	CPI	66,775	58.84	Gour Chandra Lohar	BJP	32,839	28.94	33,936	29.90
248	Chhatna	Anath Bandhu Mondal	RSP	53,751	52.04	Mahasweta Mondal	AITC	36,300	35.14	17,451	16.90
249	Gangajalghati (SC)	Angad Bauri	CPM	67,319	58.11	Swapan Bauri	AITC	37,158	32.07	30,161	26.04
250	Barjora	Susmita Biswas	CPM	73,859	53.27	Daripa Shampa	AITC	53,383	38.51	20,476	14.76
251	Bankura	Partha De	CPM	68,426	50.45	Kashinath Mishra	AITC	49,926	36.81	18,500	13.64
252	Onda	Tarapada Chakrabarti	AIFB	80,618	60.26	Abeda Bibi Sk.	AITC	32,923	24.61	47,695	35.65
253	Vishnupur	Swapan Ghosh	CPM	76,334	59.00	Subhasis Batabayal	AITC	27,655	21.38	48,679	37.62
254	Kotulpur	Kalpana Koley	CPM	95,146	64.73	Sen Maumdar Aloka	AITC	40,974	27.88	54,172	36.85
255	Indas (SC)	Mahadeb Patra	CPM	86,056	64.05	Digar Basudeb	AITC	34,491	25.67	51,565	38.38
256	Sonamukhi (SC)	Niresh Bagdi	CPM	69,455	56.39	Dipali Saha	AITC	37,751	30.65	31,704	25.74
257	Kulti	Ujjal Chatterjee	AITC	57,097	54.55	Acharya Maniklal	AIFB	40,281	38.48	16,816	16.07
258	Barabani	Dilip Sarkar	CPM	59,783	52.02	Upadhyay Manik	AITC	44,401	38.63	15,382	13.39
259	Hirapur	Amitava Mukhopadhyay	CPM	44,238	47.83	Ghatak Moloy	AITC	41,634	45.01	2,604	2.82
260	Asansol	Prativaranjan Mukherjee	CPM	52,692	49.12	Kalyan Banerjee	AITC	40,882	38.11	11,810	11.01
261	Raniganj	Haradhan Jha	CPM	71,981	68.29	Jitendra Tiwari	AITC	21,810	20.69	50,171	47.60
262	Jamuria	Dhirajlal Hazra	CPM	71,999	68.80	Tapan Chakraborty	AITC	17,226	16.46	54,773	52.34
263	Ukhra (SC)	Madan Bauri	CPM	90,852	66.00	Upender Paswan	JD(U)	22,207	16.13	68,645	49.87
264	Durgapur-I	Mrinal Banerjee	CPM	61,924	59.90	Banshi Badan Karmakar	INC	20,952	20.27	40,972	39.63
265	Durgapur-II	Biprendu Kumar Chakraborty	CPM	1,11,818	54.78	Apurba Mukherjee	AITC	75,625	37.05	36,193	17.73
266	Kanksa (SC)	Ankure Saresh	CPM	87,937	65.68	Lakshi Narayan Saha	AITC	33,150	24.76	54,787	40.92
267	Ausgram (SC)	Kartick Chandra Bag	CPM	85,952	66.28	Chhaya Chowdhury	AITC	25,956	20.01	59,996	46.27
268	Bhatar	Sayed Md. Masih	CPM	75,610	57.96	Banamali Hajra	AITC	40,307	30.90	35,303	27.06
269	Galsi	Mehbub Mondal	AIFB	85,098	67.68	Anil Kumar Saha	BJP	26,682	21.22	58,416	46.46
270	Burdwan North	Pradip Tah	CPM	1,06,838	63.63	Deb Narayan Guha	AITC	43,423	25.86	63,415	37.77
271	Burdwan South	Nirupam Sen	CPM	99,218	56.53	Samir Kumar Roy	AITC	63,976	36.45	35,242	20.08
272	Khandaghosh (SC)	Prasanta Majhi	CPM	89,701	68.64	Biswanath Roy	AITC	30,815	23.58	58,886	45.06
273	Raina	Swapan Samanta	CPM	91,990	66.43	Nityananda Tah	AITC	34,334	24.79	57,656	41.64
274	Jamalpur (SC)	Samar Hazra	IND	94,568	63.61	Sankar Chandra Mallick	AITC	41,517	27.92	53,051	35.69
275	Memari	Sandhya Bhattacharya	CPM	1,03,173	60.63	Sk. Mohammad Ismile	AITC	48,094	28.26	55,079	32.37
276	Kalna	Anjali Mondal	CPM	90,046	59.74	Asis Chakraborty	AITC	42,999	28.53	47,047	31.21
277	Nadanghat	Swapan Debnath	AITC	84,790	49.62	Ratan Das	CPM	75,032	43.91	9,758	5.71
278	Manteswar	Chaudhuri Md. Hedayatullah	CPM	73,281	57.93	Narayan Hazra Chowdhury	AITC	36,403	28.78	36,878	29.15
279	Purbasthali	Subrata Bhowal	CPM	71,213	50.03	Ansar Mondal	AITC	55,178	38.76	16,035	11.27
280	Katwa	Chatterjee Rabindranath	INC	76,806	48.41	Sudipta Bagchi	CPM	71,401	45.00	5,405	3.41
281	Mangalkot	Sadhana Mallik	CPM	72,664	59.24	Abdul Based Sekh	AITC	32,050	26.13	40,614	33.11
282	Ketugram (SC)	Tamal Chandra Majhi	CPM	77,751	59.34	Amar Ram	INC	44,575	34.02	33,176	25.32
283	Nanur (SC)	Joydeb Hazra	CPM	72,713	58.56	Gadadhar Hazra	AITC	41,348	33.30	31,365	25.26
284	Bolpur	Tapan Hore	RSP	73,493	58.50	Rakshit Chitta Ranjan	AITC	30,627	24.38	42,866	34.12
285	Labhpur	Nabanita Mukherjee	CPM	65,265	57.69	Ojha Debasis	AITC	33,724	29.81	31,541	27.88
286	Dubrajpur	Ghosh Bhakti Pada	AIFB	75,907	60.34	Sailen Mahata	AITC	23,252	18.48	52,655	41.86
287	Rajnagar (SC)	Bijoy Bagdi	AIFB	69,021	61.42	Seuli Saha	AITC	36,584	32.56	32,437	28.86
288	Suri	Tapan Roy	CPM	68,545	48.51	Swapan Kanti Ghosh	INC	48,170	34.09	20,375	14.42
289	Mahammad Bazar	Dhiren Bagdi	CPM	69,740	53.74	Biswajit Mukherjee	INC	43,260	33.34	26,480	20.40
290	Mayureswar (SC)	Bagdi Sadhucharan	CPM	66,814	61.02	Subhas Chandra Mandal	BJP	29,813	27.23	37,001	33.79
291	Rampurhat	Asish Banerjee	AITC	62,223	47.86	Nirad Baran Mandal	AIFB	54,070	41.59	8,153	6.27
292	Hansan (SC)	Asit Kumar Mal	INC	60,314	50.90	Khagendra Nath Mal	CPM	50,824	42.89	9,490	8.01
293	Nalhati	Dipak Chatterjee	AIFB	58,787	50.44	Abdul Walee Mollah	INC	48,620	41.72	10,167	8.72
294	Murarai	Elahi Md. Qamre	CPM	61,876	47.70	Dr. Motahar Hossain	INC	57,657	44.45	4,219	3.25

== See also ==
- Left Front Ministry in West Bengal in 2006
