= Sk. Omar Ali =

West Bengal politician

Sheikh Omar Ali

Member of West Bengal Legislative Assembly
- In office 1971–1996
- Preceded by: Ahindra Mishra
- Succeeded by: Chittaranjan Das Thakur
- Constituency: Panskura Paschim
- In office 2011–2015
- Preceded by: Chittaranjan Das Thakur
- Succeeded by: Firoja Bibi
- In office 1998–2001
- Preceded by: Chhaya Bera
- Succeeded by: Saumen Mahapatra
- Constituency: Nandanpur

Personal details
- Born: 1931 Bijaharpur, Midnapore district, Bengal Presidency, British India
- Died: September 1, 2015 (aged 83–84) Kolkata, West Bengal, India
- Party: Trinamool Congress; Communist Party of India
- Education: Calcutta Homoeopathic Medical College & Hospital

Sheikh Omar Ali was an Indian politician belonging to the All India Trinamool Congress. He was a member of the West Bengal Legislative Assembly for eight terms.

== Early life and family ==
Ali was born in 1931 to a Bengali family of Muslim Sheikhs in the village of Bijaharpur, Midnapore district, West Bengal. He is the son of Sheikh Danish Mohammad. He passed his Intermediate of Arts in 1960, and then graduated with an MBBS. He was on the Register Council of Homeopathic Medicine from Calcutta Homoeopathic Medical College.

== Career ==
Ali served as a six-term consecutive member of West Bengal Legislative Assembly from Panskura Paschim from 1971 to 1996. He joined Communist Party of India (Marxist) from Communist Party of India in 1997. Then, he was elected as a member of West Bengal Legislative Assembly from Nandanpur in 1998. Later, he changed his political party again and joined All India Trinamool Congress. He was elected as a member of West Bengal Legislative Assembly from Panskura Paschim in 2011.

== Death ==
He died on 1 September 2015 at the age of 84.
