= Mugberia Assembly constituency =

Former constituency of the West Bengal Legislative Assembly, in India

Coordinates: 21°59′48″N 87°44′09″E

Mugberia
- Former constituency No. 214 for the West Bengal Legislative Assembly

Constituency details
- Country: India
- Region: East India
- State: West Bengal
- District: Purba Medinipur
- Lok Sabha constituency: Kanthi
- Established: 1967
- Abolished: 2011
- Reservation: None

Mugberia Assembly constituency was an assembly constituency in Purba Medinipur district in the Indian state of West Bengal.

== Overview ==
As a consequence of the orders of the Delimitation Commission, Mugberia Assembly constituency ceases to exist from 2011.

It was part of Kanthi (Lok Sabha constituency).

== Results ==
2001 West Bengal Legislative Assembly election: Mugberia
Party	Candidate	Votes	%	±%
WBSP	Kiranmoy Nanda	64,415	50.58	
AITC	Suvendu Adhikari	59,724	46.90	
BJP	Sadananda De	3,213	2.52	
Majority		4,691	3.68	
Turnout		127,352	90.49	
WBSP hold		Swing		

=== 1977-2006 ===
Kiranmay Nanda of West Bengal Socialist Party (at times shown in election records as Independent or as a CPI(M), he was a Janata Party candidate in 1977.) won the 214 Mugberia assembly seat seven times in a row, defeating Kajal Barman of Trinamool Congress in 2006, Suvendu Adhikari of Trinamool Congress in 2001, Narayan Mukherjee of Congress in 1996, Animesh Dayen of Congress in 1991, Krishna Chaitanyamay Nanda of Congress in 1987, Prasanta Sahoo of Congress in 1982 and Amarendra Krishna Goswami of CPI(M).

=== 1967-1972 ===
Prasanta Kumar Sahoo of Congress won in 1972. Amarendra Krishna Goswami of CPI(M) won in 1971, Biswabrata Roy Chaudhury of Bangla Congress won in 1969. B. Maity of Bangla Congress won the Mugberia seat in 1967.
