= Sintu Senapati =

Indian politician (born 1991)

Sintu Senapati (born 1991) is an Indian politician from West Bengal. He is a member of West Bengal Legislative Assembly from the Panskura Paschim Assembly constituency in Purba Medinipur district representing the Bharatiya Janata Party.

== Early life ==
Senapati is from Panskura Paschim, Purba Medinipur district, West Bengal. He is the son of Amal Senapati. He completed his Bachelor or Science in environment science at Kalinga University in 2015. He declared assets worth Rs.43 lakhs in his affidavit to the Election Commission of India.

== Career ==
Senapati won the Panskura Paschim Assembly constituency in Purba Medinipur district representing the Bharatiya Janata Party in the 2026 West Bengal Legislative Assembly election. He polled 1,37,919 votes and defeated his nearest rival, Siraj Khan of the All India Trinamool Congress, by a margin of 32,567 votes. In the 2021 West Bengal Legislative Assembly election, he lost to Firoja Bibi of the Trinamool Congress by a margin of 8,889 votes.
