= Krishnagar West Assembly constituency =

Former West Bengal Legislative Assembly Constituency

Krishnanagar West Assembly constituency was an assembly constituency in Nadia district in the Indian state of West Bengal.

== Members of Legislative Assembly ==
Year	Name	Party
1967	Amritendu Mukherjee	Communist Party of India (Marxist)
1969	Amritendu Mukherjee	Communist Party of India (Marxist)
1971	Amritendu Mukherjee	Communist Party of India (Marxist)
1972	Shibdas Mukherjee	Indian National Congress
1977	Amritendu Mukherjee	Communist Party of India (Marxist)
1982	Amritendu Mukherjee	Communist Party of India (Marxist)
1987	Amritendu Mukherjee	Communist Party of India (Marxist)
1991	Sunil Kumar Ghosh	Communist Party of India (Marxist)
1996	Sunil Kumar Ghosh	Communist Party of India (Marxist)
2001	Sunil Kumar Ghosh	Communist Party of India (Marxist)
2006	Asoke Banerjee	Communist Party of India (Marxist)

== Election History ==
In the 2006 state assembly elections, Asoke Banerjee of CPI(M) won the Krishnagar West assembly seat defeating his nearest rival Ujjal Biswas of Trinamool Congress. Sunil Kumar Ghosh of CPI(M) defeated Ujjal Biswas of Trinamool Congress in 2001, Biswarup Mukherjee of Congress in 1996 and Ujjal Biswas of Congress in 1991. Amritendu Mukherjee of CPI(M) defeated Gouri Sankar Dutta of Congress in 1987 and 1982, and Mohadeb Bhattacharya of Janata Party in 1977.

Shibdas Mukherjee of Congress won in 1972. Amritendu Mukherjee of CPI(M) won in 1971, 1969 and 1967.
