= Phiroja Bibi =

Indian politician

Member of the West Bengal Legislative Assembly
- In office 25 May 2016 – 3 May 2026
- Preceded by: Sk. Omar Ali
- Succeeded by: Sintu Senapati
- Constituency: Panskura Paschim
- In office 9 January 2009 – 24 May 2016
- Preceded by: Sheikh Mohammad Illias
- Succeeded by: Suvendu Adhikari
- Constituency: Nandigram

Personal details
- Born: 1951 (age 74–75) Nandigram, West Bengal
- Party: Trinamool Congress

Phiroja Bibi (born 1951) is an Indian politician from West Bengal. She is a member of the West Bengal Legislative Assembly from Panskura Paschim Assembly constituency in Purba Medinipur district. She won the 2021 West Bengal Legislative Assembly election representing the All India Trinamool Congress.

== Early life and education ==
Bibi is from Nandigram, West Bengal. She is the wife of Manirul. She passed Class 8 and later discontinued studies after Class 9 at Khejuri Adarsha Bidyapith.

== Career ==
Bibi won from Panskura Paschim Assembly constituency representing All India Trinamool Congress in the 2021 West Bengal Legislative Assembly election. She polled 111,705 votes and defeated her nearest rival, Sintu Senapati of the Bharatiya Janata Party, by 8,889 votes. Earlier, she won the 2016 Assembly election, also from the Panskura Paschim constituency.
