= Panskura Paschim Assembly constituency =

Panskura Paschim
- Constituency No. 205 for the West Bengal Legislative Assembly
- Interactive Map Outlining Panskura Paschim Assembly Constituency

Constituency details
- Country: India
- Region: East India
- State: West Bengal
- District: Purba Medinipur
- Lok Sabha constituency: Ghatal
- Established: 1951
- Total electors: 211,399
- Reservation: None

Member of Legislative Assembly
- 18th West Bengal Legislative Assembly
- Incumbent Sintu Senapati
- Party: BJP
- Alliance: NDA
- Elected year: 2026
- Preceded by: Firoja Bibi

Panskura Paschim Assembly constituency is an assembly constituency in Purba Medinipur district in the Indian state of West Bengal.

== Overview ==
As per orders of the Delimitation Commission of India, No. 205 Panskura Paschim Assembly constituency is composed of the following: Panskura CD Block.

Panskura Paschim Assembly constituency is part of No. 32 Ghatal (Lok Sabha constituency). It was earlier part of Panskura (Lok Sabha constituency).

== Members of the Legislative Assembly ==
Year	Name	Party
1951	Shyamadas Bhattachary (Panskura South)	Indian National Congress
1951	Rajanikanta Pramanik (Panskura North)	Indian National Congress
1957	Shyamadas Bhattacharya (Panskura West)	Indian National Congress
1962	Shyamadas Bhattacharya	Indian National Congress
1967	R. K. Pramanik	Bangla Congress
1969	Ahindra Mishra	Bangla Congress
1971	Sk. Omar Ali	Communist Party of India
1972	Sk. Omar Ali	Communist Party of India
1977	Sk. Omar Ali	Communist Party of India
1982	Sk. Omar Ali	Communist Party of India
1987	Sk. Omar Ali	Communist Party of India
1991	Sk. Omar Ali	Communist Party of India
1996	Chittaranjan Das Thakur	Communist Party of India
2001	Chittaranjan Das Thakur	Communist Party of India
2006	Chittaranjan Das Thakur	Communist Party of India
Major boundary changes; constituency renamed as Panskura Paschim
2011	Sk. Omar Ali	All India Trinamool Congress
2016	Firoja Bibi	All India Trinamool Congress
2021	Firoja Bibi	All India Trinamool Congress
2026	Sintu Senapati	Bharatiya Janata Party

== Election results ==
=== 2026 ===
2026 West Bengal Legislative Assembly election: Panskura Paschim
Party	Candidate	Votes	%	±%
BJP	Sintu Senapati	137,919	53.37	▲9.46
AITC	Siraj Khan	105,352	40.77	▼6.94
ISF	Afjal Ali Shah	8,702	3.37	
NOTA	None of the above	1,262	0.49	▼0.08
Majority		32,567	12.6	▲8.8
Turnout		258,432	92.55	▲7.13
BJP gain from AITC		Swing		

=== 2021 ===
West Bengal assembly elections, 2021: Panskura Paschim
Party	Candidate	Votes	%	±%
AITC	Firoja Bibi	111,705	47.71	▲3.52
BJP	Sintu Senapati	102,816	43.91	▲34.63
CPI	Chittaranjan Das Thakur	15,124	6.46	▼36.22
NOTA	None of the above	1,337	0.57	
Majority		8,889	3.8	
Turnout		234,141	85.42	
AITC hold		Swing		

=== 2016 ===
2016 West Bengal Legislative Assembly election: Panskura Paschim
Party	Candidate	Votes	%	±%
AITC	Firoja Bibi	92,427	44.19	▼5.78
CPI	Chittaranjan Das Thakur	89,282	42.68	▼2.4
BJP	Narayan Kinkar Mishra	19,403	9.28	▲6.07
NOTA	None of the above	2,125	1.02	
Independent	Tarun Samanta	1,524	0.73	
Independent	Nisith Kumar Maiti	1,104	0.53	
SUCI(C)	Sk. Abdul Masud	1,007	0.48	
Majority		3,145	1.50	
Turnout		209,166	84.79	
AITC hold		Swing		

.# Swing calculated on Left Front+Congress vote percentages taken together in 2016.

=== 2011 ===
West Bengal assembly elections, 2011: Panskura Paschim
Party	Candidate	Votes	%	±%
AITC	Dr. Omar Ali	93,349	49.97	+9.40#
CPI	Nirmal Kumar Bera	84,209	45.08	−12.17
BJP	Narayan Kinkar Mishra	5,994	3.21	
Independent	Nisith Kumar Maiti	3,249	1.99	
Majority		9,140	5.59	
Turnout		163,577	87.85	
AITC gain from CPI		Swing	21.57#	

.# Swing calculated on Congress+Trinamool Congress vote percentages taken together in 2006.

=== 2006 ===
In the 2006, 2001 and 1996 state assembly elections Chittaranjan Das Thakur of CPI won the Panskura West assembly seat defeating Jaidul Khan of Trinamool Congress in 2006, and Jakiur Rahman Khan of Trinamool Congress/ Congress in 2001 and 1996. Contests in most years among multiple candidates but only winners and runners are being mentioned. Omar Ali of CPI defeated Sk. Golam Murshed of Congress in 1991, Asit Baran Samanta of Congress in 1987, Jyoti Kumar Roy of Congress in 1982, and Jyoti Kumar Roy of Janata Party in 1977.

=== 1972 ===
Sk. Omar Ali of CPI won in 1972 and 1971. Ahindra Mishra of Bangla Congress won in 1969. R.K.Pramanik of Bangla Congress won in 1967. Shymadas Bhattacharya of Congress won in 1962 and 1957. In independent India's first election in 1951, the two seats at Panskura were named Panskura North and Panskura South. While Shyamadas Bhattacharya of Congress won the Panskura South seat, Rajanikanta Pramanik won the Panskura North seat.
