= Chittaranjan Das Thakur =

Indian politician (died 2021)

Chittaranjan Das Thakur (died 8 November 2021) was an Indian politician and leader of Communist Party of India. He represented Panskura Paschim constituency from 1996 to 2011.
