= Narghat Assembly constituency =

Former constituency of the West Bengal Legislative Assembly, in India

Coordinates: 22°07′54″N 87°53′24″E

Narghat
- Former constituency No. 207 for the West Bengal Legislative Assembly

Constituency details
- Country: India
- Region: East India
- State: West Bengal
- District: Purba Medinipur
- Lok Sabha constituency: Tamluk
- Established: 1967
- Abolished: 2011
- Reservation: None

Narghat Assembly constituency was an assembly constituency in Purba Medinipur district in the Indian state of West Bengal.

== Overview ==
As a consequence of the orders of the Delimitation Commission, Narghat Assembly constituency ceases to exist from 2011.

It was part of Tamluk (Lok Sabha constituency).

== Members of the Legislative Assembly ==
Election Year	Constituency	Name of M.L.A.	Party affiliation
1967		Prafulla Kumar Gayen	Bangla Congress
1969		Subodh Chandra Maity	Indian National Congress
1971		Bankim Behari Maity	Bangla Congress
1972		Saradindu Samanta	Indian National Congress
1977		Bankim Behari Maity	Janata Party
1982		Bankim Behari Maity	Janata Party
1987		Bankim Behari Maity	Independent
1991		Brahmamay Nanda	Communist Party of India (Marxist)
1996		Brahmamay Nanda	Communist Party of India (Marxist)
2001		Brahmamay Nanda	West Bengal Socialist Party
2006		Brahmamay Nanda	West Bengal Socialist Party

== Results ==
=== 2006 ===
West Bengal assembly elections, 2006: Narghat
Party	Candidate	Votes	%	±%
CPI(M)	Brahmamoy Nanda	75,212		
AITC	Amiya Kanti Bhattacharjee (Kablu)	66,602		
INC	Suvendu Kumar Bej	3,802		
SP	Pratap Nayek	2,227		
PDS	Sk. Zakir Hussain	2,103		
Turnout		150,046	(91.9%)	
CPI(M) hold		Swing	10.65#	

.# Swing calculated on Trinamool Congress+BJP vote percentages taken together in 2006.

=== 1977-2006 ===
In the 2006, 2001, 1996, and 1991 state assembly elections, Brahmamay Nanda of West Bengal Socialist Party (contested on CPI(M) symbol in 1996 and 1991) won the 207 Narghat assembly seat defeating his nearest rivals Amiya Kanti Bhattacharya of Trinamool Congress in 2006 and 2001, Suvendu Kumar Bej of Congress in 1996, and Swades Kumar Manna of Congress in 1991. Bankim Behari Maity, Independent/ Janata Party, defeated Suvendu Bej of Congress in 1987, Swadesh Kumar Manna, Independent in 1982 and Saradindu Samanta of Congress in 1977.

=== 1967-1972 ===
Saradindu Samanta of Congress won in 1972. Bankim Behary Maity of Bangla Congress won in 1971. Subodh Chandra Maity of Congress won in 1969. P.K.Gayen of Bangla Congress won in 1967. Prior to that the Narghat seat did not exist.
