= Kiranmoy Nanda =

Indian politician

Member of Parliament, Rajya Sabha
- In office 3 April 2012 – 2 April 2018
- Succeeded by: Vijaypal Singh Tomar
- Constituency: Uttar Pradesh

Minister of Fisheries, Aqua-culture, Harbours, Government of West Bengal
- In office 19 June 1991 – 20 May 2011
- Preceded by: Bhakti Bhushan Mandal
- Succeeded by: Abu Hena

Member of the West Bengal Legislative Assembly
- In office 27 June 1977 – 13 May 2011
- Preceded by: Prasanta Kumar Sahoo
- Succeeded by: Constituency abolished
- Constituency: Mugberia

Personal details
- Born: 16 May 1944 (age 82) Contai, Bengal Presidency, British India (now Contai, West Bengal, India)
- Party: Samajwadi Party (2010–present); West Bengal Socialist Party (1980–2010); Janata Party (1977–1980)
- Education: University of Calcutta (B.A.)
- Profession: Politician, social worker

Kiranmoy Nanda (born 16 May 1944) is an Indian politician, belonging to the Samajwadi Party. He was the Fisheries Minister in the Left Front cabinet in the state of West Bengal from 1982 till 2011 when he was succeeded by Congress MLA Abu Hena. Nanda was the general secretary of the West Bengal Socialist Party for many years. Nanda served as general secretary of the Samajwadi Party between 1996 and 2000 as the WBSP had merged with SP. In 2000, after the Kolkata Municipal Corporation election, Nanda broke with SP and reconstituted the WBSP. In April 2010 he again became general secretary of SP, as WBSP again merged with SP.

Nanda is the son of Jyotirmoy Nanda, a prominent academic and social worker in Mugberia in East Midnapore district. Kiranmoy Nanda began his political activism in the All India Students Federation (the student wing of the Communist Party of India). Nanda was elected to the West Bengal Legislative Assembly as a Janata Party candidate from the Mugberia assembly constituency in 1977. He joined the WBSP when it was constituted in 1981. He won the Mugberia seat again in 1982, 1987, 1991, 1996, 2001 and 2006. His share of votes has ranged from 58.42% (1987) and 46.94% (1977). He faced a tough challenge as he contested the 2011 Assembly polls from a Congress stronghold - North Dinajpur's Raiganj (Vidhan Sabha constituency), losing by some 5,500 votes to the Congress candidate Mohit Sengupta, an aide of Raiganj Congress MP Deepa Dasmunshi.

Nanda came under criticism from other Left Front partners after he called for early assembly elections following a parliamentary by-poll in 2009.

Nanda opposes 'Operation Green Hunt', the paramilitary operation of the Indian government against Maoist guerrillas.

Kiranmoy Nanda's brother Brahmamoy Nanda was a MLA from Narghat for 20 Years (1991-2011), elected as a WBSP candidate, but he also lost the 2011 West Bengal Assembly election from the Nandakumar (Vidhan Sabha constituency).
