= Nandanpur Assembly constituency =

Coordinates: 22°34′34″N 87°39′42″E

Nandanpur
- Former constituency No. 199 for the West Bengal Legislative Assembly

Constituency details
- Country: India
- Region: East India
- State: West Bengal
- District: Paschim Medinipur
- Lok Sabha constituency: Panskura
- Established: 1977
- Abolished: 2011
- Reservation: None

Nandanpur Assembly constituency was an assembly constituency in Paschim Medinipur district in the Indian state of West Bengal.

== Overview ==
As a consequence of the orders of the Delimitation Commission, Nandanpur Assembly constituency ceased to exist from 2011.

It was part of Panskura (Lok Sabha constituency).

== Election results ==
=== 1977–2006 ===
In the 2006 state assembly elections, Bula Choudhury of CPI(M) won the No. 199 Nandanpur assembly seat, defeating her nearest rival Nanda Kumar Mishra of Trinamool Congress. Saumen Mahapatra of Trinamool Congress defeated Sk. Omar Ali of CPI(M) in 2001. In a 1998 by-election, Sk. Omar Ali of CPI(M) defeated Saumen Mahapatra of Trinamool Congress. The by-election occurred due to the resignation of CPI(M) MLA Chhaya Bera. Chhaya Bera of CPI(M) defeated Nirmal Maity of Congress in 1996, Rabindra Nath Bag of Congress in 1991, Nirmal Maity of Congress in 1987, and Asutosh Chakraborty of Congress in 1982. Manoranjan Roy of CPI(M) defeated Jagadish Chandra Majhi of Janata Party in 1977.
