= West Bengal Socialist Party =

- Secretary: Manindra Chandra Paul
- Founder: Kiranmoy Nanda
- Founded: 1980 (46 years ago)
- Headquarters: 42 Ananda Palit Road, Kolkata – 700014
- Ideology: Socialism
- Political position: Left-wing
- Colours: Pink
- ECI status: Registered - Unrecognised
- Alliance: Left Front (1980–2010); Left Front+ (since 2026)

West Bengal Socialist Party (WBSP) is a political party in the Indian state of West Bengal. WBSP was formed when the Bengali socialists in the then Janata Party split in the beginning of the 1980s (the other faction became the Democratic Socialist Party). WBSP was a part of Left Front. The party founder, Kiranmoy Nanda, was the Fisheries Minister in the Left Front government then.

The party upheld the ideals of Jayaprakash Narayan, Ram Manohar Lohia and Narendra Dev. In 1990s, the party merged with the Samajwadi Party of Mulayam Singh Yadav. Kiranmoy Nanda became one of the national secretaries of SP. But due to the differences between SP and the Communists in April 1999 over supporting Congress in forming a government after the defeat of the Vajpayee government in the trust vote, WBSP was resurrected once again.

In the state assembly elections 2001 WBSP launched four candidates, supported by Left Front. All four got elected. In total the party received 246,407 votes. In the 2005 municipal polls in Kolkata, WBSP contested 2 seats (ward no. 55 and 63) as a part of LF. It lost in both seats.

In the 2006 West Bengal state assembly election, WBSP retained its four seats. Senior leaders of the party included Moni Pal and Jonmejay Ojha. The party has influence in parts of East Midnapore, Malda, Nadia and Murshidabad.

In the 2008 Panchayat Elections, it has secured a zilla parishad seat in Malda and 2 municipality seats in the Krishnagar municipality.

In April 2010, Kiranmoy Nanda again became a general secretary of SP. Subsequently, WBSP again merged with SP. Although WBSP had previously merged with SP in 2010 but it continues to operate as a minor regional political entity in West Bengal.
