= Arjun Singh (West Bengal politician) =

Indian politician (born 1962)

Labour Minister of West Bengal
- Incumbent
- Assumed office 1 June 2026
- Governor: R. N. Ravi
- Chief Minister: Suvendu Adhikari
- MOS: Bhaskar Bhattacharya
- Preceded by: Becharam Manna

Transport Minister of West Bengal
- Incumbent
- Assumed office 1 June 2026
- Governor: R. N. Ravi
- Chief Minister: Suvendu Adhikari
- MOS: Anandamoy Barman
- Preceded by: Snehasis Chakraborty

Member of West Bengal Legislative Assembly
- Incumbent
- Assumed office 4 May 2026
- Preceded by: Manju Basu
- Constituency: Noapara
- In office 14 May 2001 – 23 May 2019
- Preceded by: Bidyut Ganguly
- Succeeded by: Pawan Kumar Singh
- Constituency: Bhatpara

Member of Parliament, Lok Sabha for Barrackpore
- In office 23 May 2019 – 4 June 2024
- Preceded by: Dinesh Trivedi
- Succeeded by: Partha Bhowmick

Personal details
- Born: 2 April 1962 (age 64) Kolkata, West Bengal, India
- Party: Bharatiya Janata Party (2019–2022, 2024–present)
- Other political affiliations: Trinamool Congress (1998–2019, 2022–2024); Indian National Congress (until 1998)
- Children: Pawan
- Occupation: Politician; social worker; businessman
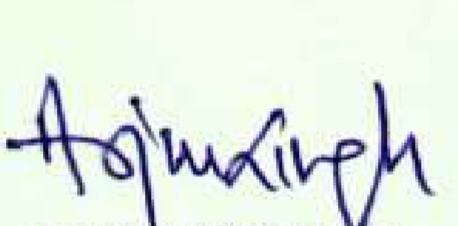
- Signature

Arjun Singh (born 2 April 1962) is an Indian politician and currently serving as the Cabinet minister for Labour and Transport at the Government of West Bengal. He was a Member of Parliament in the 17th Lok Sabha from Barrackpore Lok Sabha constituency in West Bengal.

Previously, Singh had also won Bhatpara assembly seat consecutive four times since 2001 as a Trinamool Congress candidate. He has also been appointed one of the twelve vice-presidents of the West Bengal Unit of BJP on 1 June 2020.

On 22 May 2022, he rejoined Trinamool Congress. Singh again joined BJP, quitting TMC on 15 March 2024 before Lok Sabha election.

== Personal life ==
Singh was born on 2 April 1962 in North 24 Parganas, Kolkata, West Bengal. His father, Satyanarayan Singh, was an active politician from INC and three term MLA from Bhatpara.

Arjun completed his schooling from Chashma-I-Rahamat High School. He joined Rishi Bankim Chandra College at Naihati for graduation. He stopped his studies due to active involvement in politics. He also worked as Mazdoor Worker for a year in Jute Mills during his early days.

== Political career ==
Arjun Singh started his political journey by winning Bhatpara Municipality Election as councillor from Indian National Congress in 1995.

He later joined Trinamool Congress and contested state assembly election in 2001 as a Trinamool Congress candidate. He defeated his nearest candidate Ramprasad Kundu of CPI(M) and moved for the first time to state assembly. He has served Bhatpara Assembly since 2001.

Arjun Singh was also a candidate of Trinamool Congress from Barrackpore in the 2004 General Elections but he lost to Tarit Baran Topdar of the Communist Party of India (Marxist).

He won his Bhatpara assembly seat consecutive four times since 2001 as Trinamool Congress candidate. Singh was the president of "Hindi wing" of Trinamool Congress. He was also the "State Incharge" of Uttar Pradesh, Bihar, Jharkhand, Punjab of Trinamool Congress, and also the chairman of Bhatpara municipality.

In March 2019, Singh joined Bharatiya Janata Party (BJP) and contested the 2019 Lok Sabha election from Barrackpore Parliamentary seat as a BJP candidate and won.

In May 2022, he raised the issue of closure of jute-mills in Barrackpore and after it he met Piyush Goyal, Textile Minister of India to solve the issue. According to him, the outcome of the meeting was not satisfactory as he expected. Following this he rejoined Trinamool Congress on 22 May.

On 15 March 2024, Singh again joined BJP as Trinamool Congress denied to give him a ticket to Lok Sabha election..

On 4 May 2026 again Singh Won the Legislative Assembly Election from Noapara and also Grab the Six Assembly seats From AITC under Barrackpore Lok Sabha By giving his fighting and Organisational Support to respective BJP Assembly Candidates and became the cabinet minister in West Bengal Government.

== Electoral Performance ==
=== Loksabha ===
Year	Constituency	Party	Votes	Votes %	Opponent	Opponent party	Opponent votes	Opponent votes %	Margin	Margin %	Result
2004	Barrackpore	AITC	277,977	34.99	Tarit Baran Topdar	CPI(M)	443,048	55.77	-165,071	-20.78	Lost
2019	Barrackpore	BJP	472,994	42.82	Dinesh Trivedi	AITC	458,137	41.48	14,857	1.25	Won
2024	Barrackpore	BJP	520,231	39.92	Partha Bhowmick	AITC	520,231	45.56	-64,438	-5.64	Lost

=== West Bengal Legislative Assembly ===
Year	Constituency	Party	Votes	Votes %	Opponent	Opponent party	Opponent votes	Opponent votes %	Margin	Margin %	Result
2001	Bhatpara	AITC	53,467	55.31	Ramprasad Kundu	CPI(M)	36,669	37.93	16,798	15.38	Won
2006	Bhatpara	AITC	50,368	61.47	Harimohan Nath	CPI(M)	21,692	26.47	28,676	35	Won
2011	Bhatpara	AITC	66,938	70.94	Nepaldeb Bhattacharya	CPI(M)	22,553	23.90	44,385	47.04	Won
2016	Bhatpara	AITC	59,253	54.57	Jitendra Shaw	Independent	30,318	27.92	28,935	26.65	Won
2026	Noapara	BJP	94,415	43.37	Trinankur Bhattacharjee	AITC	76,759	39.33%	17,656	9.04	Won

== Challenges ==
Singh won his Lok Sabha seat despite significant challenges. He claimed that many cases were made on him by ruling party TMC within the two months after joining BJP to allegedly harass him. Barrackpore Police tried to arrest him before Counting Day of the 2019 Indian general election. Singh appealed to the Supreme Court of India for relief and the court agreed. His house was also attacked with bombs and his car was also damaged by a TMC worker who threw stones, bombs and bricks. His son also had to face attacks in his car.

Even after the elections, the violence against Singh continued, his residence was attacked with seven rounds of fire and two bombs were hurled near his office and residence.

On 1 September 2019, Singh sustained a head injury during a clash between BJP and TMC supporters over control of party-office at Shyamnagar, which is under Jagatdal assembly constituency. He said that his car was vandalised by TMC cadres. On 5 July 2020 once again he claimed that his car was vandalised by TMC Cadres at Halisahar, he was present in house of a BJP worker for virtual meeting preparation for JP Nadda. However, local TMC leader Subodh Adhikari denied the claim and said it was the BJP MP who instigated the attack.

The Supreme Court on Friday protected BJP leaders Arjun Singh, Kailash Vijayvargiya, Pawan Singh, Mukul Roy and Saurav Singh from any coercive steps to be taken by the West Bengal Police in FIRs registered against them which are pending investigation.

== Controversy ==
Bengal court issues arrest warrant against Arjun Singh. He was accused of firing shots at a couple of TMC workers in North 24 Parganas district of West Bengal.
