= Barrackpur Lok Sabha constituency =

Lok Sabha Constituency in West Bengal

Coordinates: 22°46′N 88°22′E

Barrackpur WB-15
- Lok Sabha constituency
- Interactive Map Outlining Barrackpur Lok Sabha Constituency

Constituency details
- Country: India
- Region: East India
- State: West Bengal
- Assembly constituencies: Amdanga; Bijpur; Naihati; Bhatpara; Jagatdal; Noapara; Barrackpur
- Established: 1951
- Total electors: 15,08,728 (2024)
- Reservation: None

Member of Parliament
- 18th Lok Sabha
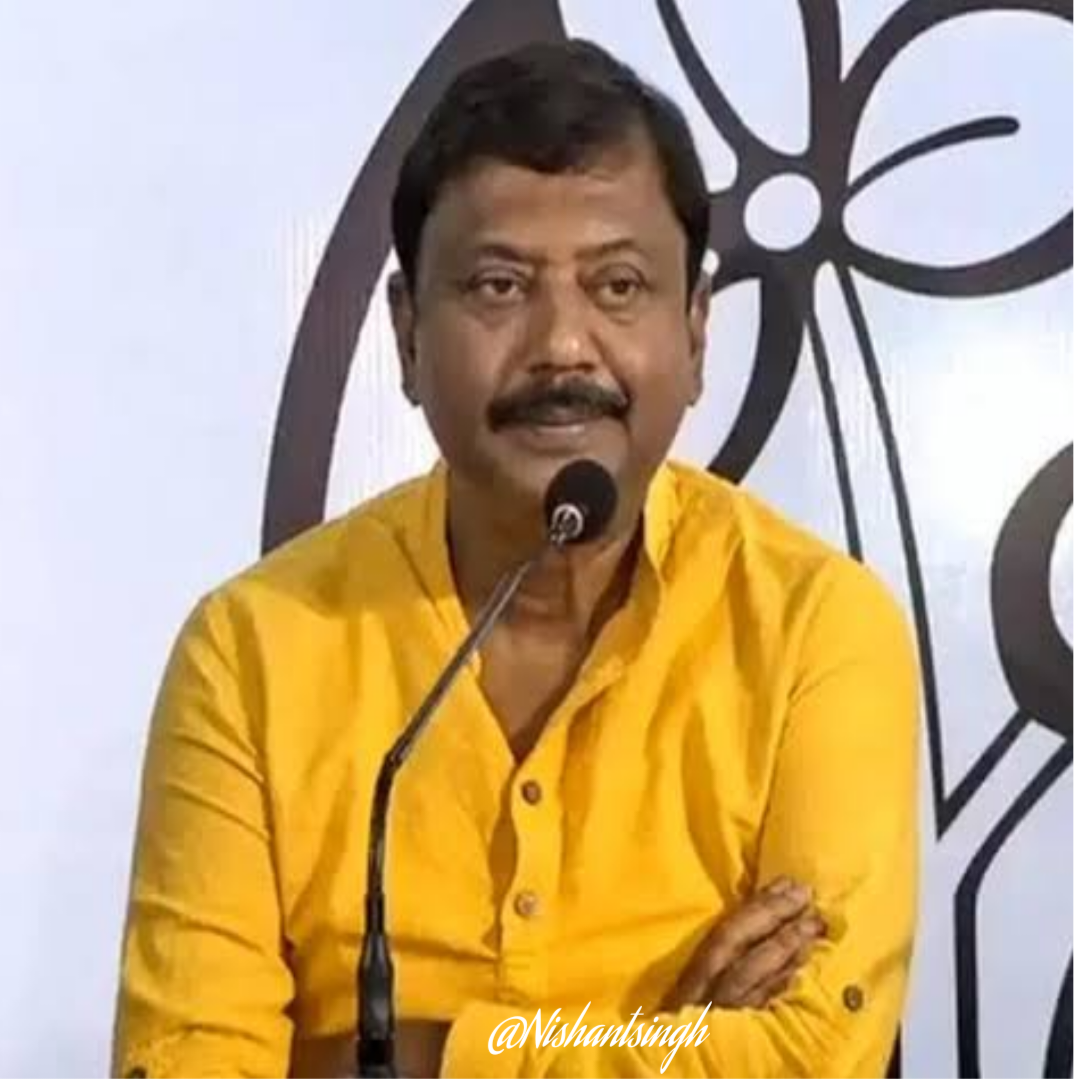
- Incumbent Partha Bhowmick
- Party: NCPI
- Alliance: NDA
- Elected year: 2024

Barrackpur Lok Sabha constituency (or Barrackpore Lok Sabha constituency, officially until 2009) is one of the 543 parliamentary constituencies in India. The constituency centres on Barrackpore in West Bengal. All of the seven assembly segments of No. 15 Barrackpur Lok Sabha constituency are in North 24 Parganas district.

Most successful parties from Barrackpore Loksabha
1. Communist Party of India (Marxist) (10 times) 52.94 (50.0%)
2. Indian National Congress (3 times) 17.65 (16.7%)
3. Trinamool Congress (3times) 17.65 (16.7%)
4. Communist Party of India (1 time) 5.88 (5.55%)
5. Bharatiya Janata Party (1 time) 5.88 (5.55%)
6. Praja Socialist Party (1 time) 5.88 (5.55%)

== Assembly segments ==
As per order of the Delimitation Commission in respect of the delimitation of constituencies in the West Bengal, parliamentary constituency no. 15 Barrackpur is composed of the following assembly segments from 2009:

#	Name	District	Member	Party	2024 Lead
102	Amdanga	North 24 Parganas	Mohammad Kasem Siddique	AITC	AITC
103	Bijpur	North 24 Parganas	Sudipta Das	BJP	AITC
104	Naihati	North 24 Parganas	Sumitro Chatterjee	BJP	AITC
105	Bhatpara	North 24 Parganas	Pawan Singh	BJP	BJP
106	Jagatdal	North 24 Parganas	Rajesh Kumar	BJP	AITC
107	Noapara	North 24 Parganas	Arjun Singh	BJP	AITC
108	Barrackpur	North 24 Parganas	Kaustuv Bagchi	BJP	AITC

== Members of Parliament ==
=== Barrackpore (1952‍–‍2009) ===
Year	Member	Party
1952	Ramananda Das	Indian National Congress
1957	Bimal Kumar Ghosh	Praja Socialist Party
1962	Renu Chakravartty	Communist Party of India
1967	Mohammed Ismail	Communist Party of India (Marxist)
1971	Mohammed Ismail	Communist Party of India (Marxist)
1977	Saugata Roy	Indian National Congress
1980	Mohammad Ismail	Communist Party of India (Marxist)
1984	Debi Ghosal	Indian National Congress
1989	Tarit Baran Topdar	Communist Party of India (Marxist)
1991	Tarit Baran Topdar	Communist Party of India (Marxist)
1996	Tarit Baran Topdar	Communist Party of India (Marxist)
1998	Tarit Baran Topdar	Communist Party of India (Marxist)
1999	Tarit Baran Topdar	Communist Party of India (Marxist)
2004	Tarit Baran Topdar	Communist Party of India (Marxist)

=== Barrackpur (since 2009) ===
Year	Member	Party
2009	Dinesh Trivedi	Trinamool Congress
2014	Dinesh Trivedi	Trinamool Congress
2019	Arjun Singh	Bharatiya Janata Party
2024	Partha Bhowmick	Trinamool Congress
2026 (Note: Switched to NCPI as part of AITC Rebels in Lok Sabha.)	Partha Bhowmick	Nationalist Citizens Party of India

== Election results ==
=== General election 2024 ===
2024 Indian general election: Barrackpur
Party	Candidate	Votes	%	±%
AITC	Partha Bhowmick	520,231	45.56	▲4.08
BJP	Arjun Singh	4,55,793	39.92	▼2.90
CPI(M)	Debdut Ghosh	1,09,564	9.60	▼1.03
Majority		64,438	5.64	▲4.39
Turnout		1,141,860		
AITC gain from BJP		Swing	1.87	

=== General election 2019 ===
2019 Indian general elections: Barrackpur
Party	Candidate	Votes	%	±%
BJP	Arjun Singh	472,994	42.82	+20.90
AITC	Dinesh Trivedi	458,137	41.48	−4.11
CPI(M)	Gargi Chatterjee	117,456	10.63	−15.29
INC	Mohammad Alam	15,746	1.43	−1.47
Majority		14,857	1.25	
Turnout		1,104,699	76.91	−4.95
Registered electors		1,436,431		
BJP gain from AITC		Swing	+12.50	

=== General election 2014 ===
2014 Indian general elections: Barrackpur
Party	Candidate	Votes	%	±%
AITC	Dinesh Trivedi	479,206	45.59	−3.69
CPI(M)	Subhashini Ali	272,433	25.92	−16.92
BJP	Rumesh Kumar Handa	230,401	21.92	+18.36
INC	Samrat Topadar	30,491	2.90	+2.90
BSP	Tapash Sarkar	5458		
Independent	Dina Shankar Singh	5036		
CPI(ML)L	Omprakash Rajbhar	4416		
Independent	Omprakash Shaw	3555		
Independent	Girish Chandra Singh	3132		
SUCI(C)	Pradip Chaudhuri	2200		
CPI(ML) Red Star	Sharmistha Choudhury	2036		
AAP	Mihir Biswas	1787		
LJP	Jainal Abudeen Ahmed	10,979	1.04	−−−
Majority		206,773	19.67	+13.23
Turnout		1,051,130	81.86	+1.40
AITC hold		Swing	-3.69	

=== General election 2009 ===
General Election, 2009: Barrackpur
Party	Candidate	Votes	%	±%
AITC	Dinesh Trivedi	428,699	49.28	+14.29
CPI(M)	Tarit Baran Topdar	372,675	42.84	−14.93
BJP	Prabhakar Tewari	30,970	3.56	
BSP	Ashok Sonkar	9,359	1.08	
Independent	Rabi Shankar Paul	7,111		
Independent	Binod Kumar Singh	5,169		
CPI(ML)L	Subrata Sengupta	5,071		
Independent	Dharmendra Singh	4,720		
Independent	Dinesh Kumar Sharma	3,322		
Independent	Gopal Rout	2,872		
Majority		56,024	6.44	
Turnout		8,69,968	80.46	
AITC gain from CPI(M)		Swing		

2009 Indian general election West Bengal summary
Party	Seats won	Seat change	Vote percentage
Trinamool Congress	19	▲18	31.8
Indian National Congress	6	▲0	13.45
Socialist Unity Centre of India (Communist)	1	▲1	NA
Communist Party of India (Marxist)	9	▼17	33.1
Communist Party of India	2	▼1	3.6
Revolutionary Socialist Party	2	▼1	3.56
Forward bloc	2	▼1	3.04
Bharatiya Janata Party	1	▲1	6.14

=== General election 2004 ===
General Election, 2004: Barrackpore
Party	Candidate	Votes	%	±%
CPI(M)	Tarit Baran Topdar	443,048	55.77	
AITC	Arjun Singh	277,977	34.99	
INC	Debi Ghosal	43,750	5.51	
Independent	Subrata Biswas	9,072	1.14	
BSP	Chapala Majumder	6,473	0.81	
Independent	Tarkeshwar Singh	3,920	0.49	
Independent	Amal Kumar Sen	3,071	0.39	
Majority		165,071	20.78	
Turnout		7,94,426	80.98	
CPI(M) hold		Swing		

=== General election 1999 ===
General Election, 1999: Barrackpore
Party	Candidate	Votes	%	±%
CPI(M)	Tarit Baran Topdar	399,269		
AITC	Jayanta Bhattacharya	358,494	34.99	
INC	Ashok Shukla	59,732	5.51	
Independent	Subrata Biswas	9,072	1.14	
BSP	Chapala Majumder	6,473	0.81	
Independent	Tarkeshwar Singh	3,920	0.49	
Independent	Amal Kumar Sen	3,071	0.39	
Majority		40,775	4.78	
Turnout		7,94,426	80.98	
CPI(M) hold		Swing		

=== General elections 1951-1998 ===
Most of the contests were multi-cornered. However, only winners and runners-up are mentioned below:

Year	Voters	Voters turnout	Winner			Runners up		
Year	Voters	Voters turnout	Candidate	%age	Party	Candidate	%age	Party
1951	159,207	43.58	Ramananda Das	51.24	Indian National Congress	Debprasad Ghosh	18.89	Bharatiya Jan Sangh
1957	241747	56.18	Bimal Coomar Ghose	54.98	Praja Socialist Party	Labonya Prova Dutta	36.35	Indian National Congress
1962	404,181	68.76	Renu Chakraborty	57.56	Communist Party of India	Ram Dhari Singh	33.76	Indian National Congress
1967	424548	70.88	Md. Ismail	39.16	Communist Party of India (Marxist)	Renu Chakrabarty	32.90	Communist Party of India
1971	522,103	68.65	Md. Ismail	56.29	Communist Party of India (Marxist)	Renu Chakravarty	39.72	Communist Party of India
1977	470,020	72.23	Saugata Roy	64.60	INC	Mahammad Ismail	33.78	CPI (M)
1980	482,46	68.94	Mahammad Ismail	56.72	CPI (M)	Debi Ghosal	34.61	INC (I)
1984	617.10	79.30	Debi Ghosal	53.52	INC	Mohammad Amin	44.64	CPI (M)
1989	733,760	78.84	Tarit Baran Topdar	50.56	CPI (M)	Debi Ghosal	45.41	INC
1991	695,870	74.81	Tarit Baran Topdar	47.56	CPI (M)	Debi Ghosal	38.78	INC
1996	825,300	81.53	Tarit Baran Topdar	49.54	CPI (M)	Debi Ghosal	42.23	INC
1998	846,370	82.56	Tarit Baran Topdar	46.01	CPI (M)	Tarun Adhikary	42.65	WBTC

== See also ==
- List of constituencies of the Lok Sabha
