= Subodh Adhikary =

Indian politician

Member of the West Bengal Legislative Assembly
- In office 2 May 2021 – 4 May 2026
- Preceded by: Subhranshu Roy
- Succeeded by: Sudipta Das
- Constituency: Bijpur

District General Secretary of the All India Trinamool Youth Congress
- Incumbent
- Assumed office 14 June 2019

Personal details
- Born: 22 July 1972 (age 54) Halisahar, West Bengal, India
- Party: All India Trinamool Congress
- Spouse: Rinku Adhikary
- Children: Sarvick Adhikary, Sneha Adhikary
- Education: Mahatma Gandhi University
- Profession: Politician

Subodh Adhikary is an Indian politician from All India Trinamool Congress. In May 2021, he was elected as the member of the West Bengal Legislative Assembly from Bijpur. He is also the District General Secretary of All India Trinamool Congress from North 24 Parganas district.

== Career ==
Adhikary hails from Halisahar, North 24 Parganas. He passed B.A. in 2014 from Mahatma Gandhi University, West Bengal. His father's name is Santosh Adhikary. He contested 2021 West Bengal Legislative Assembly election from Bijpur Vidhan Sabha and won the seat against Mukul Roy's son Shubranshu Roy.
