= Sanat Dey =

Indian politician

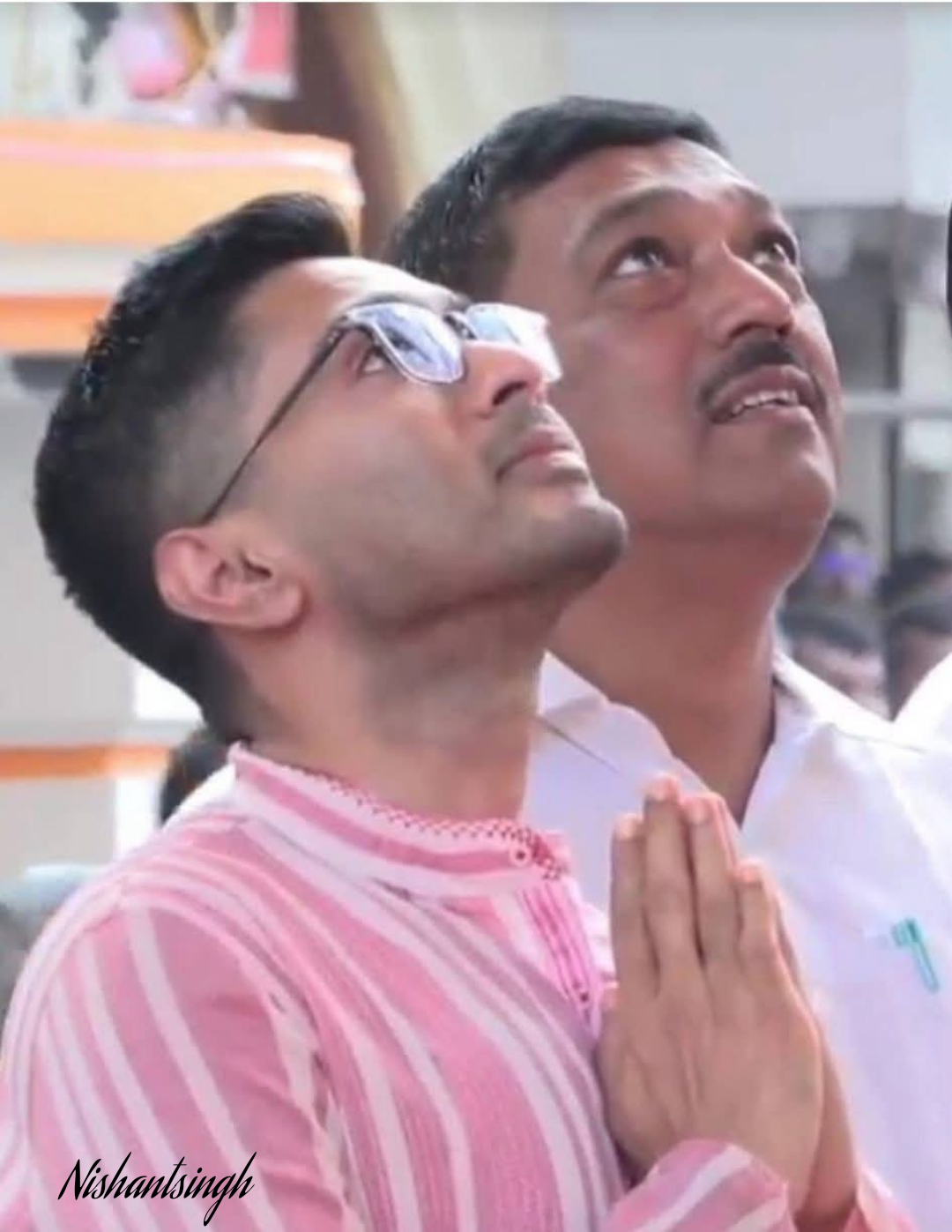

Member of the West Bengal Legislative Assembly
- In office 23 November 2024 – 7 May 2026
- Preceded by: Partha Bhowmick
- Succeeded by: Sumitro Chatterjee
- Constituency: Naihati

Personal details
- Party: All India Trinamool Congress
- Profession: Politician

Sanat Dey is an Indian politician from West Bengal. He is a member of the West Bengal Legislative Assembly since 2024, representing Naihati Assembly constituency as a Member of the All India Trinamool Congress.

== See also ==
- List of chief ministers of West Bengal
- West Bengal Legislative Assembly
