= Somenath Shyam Ichini =

Indian politician

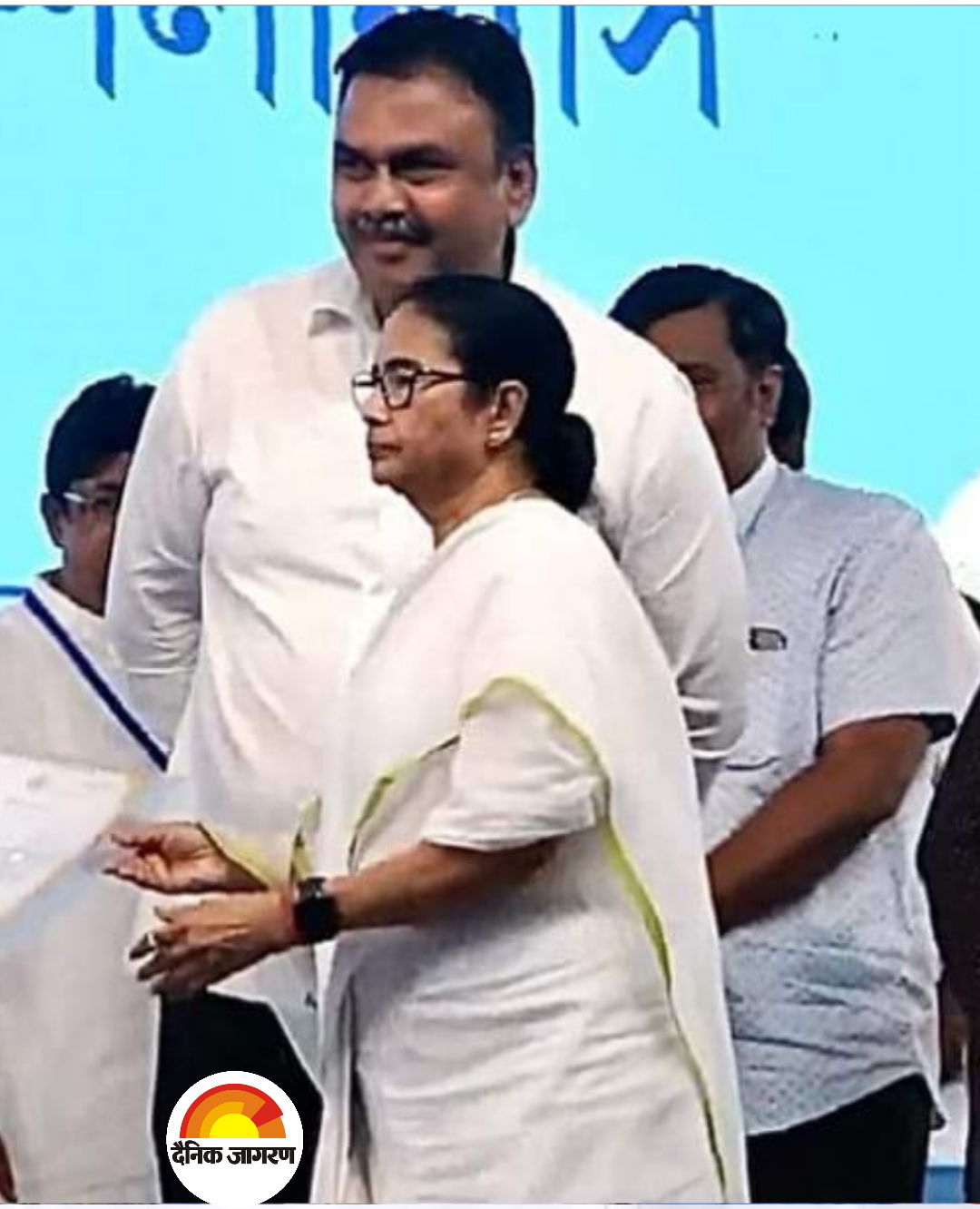

Member of the West Bengal Legislative Assembly
- In office 2 May 2021 – 4 May 2026
- Preceded by: Parash Dutta
- Succeeded by: Rajesh Kumar
- Constituency: Jagatdal

Personal details
- Party: AITC
- Profession: Politician

Somenath Shyam Ichini is an Indian politician and a member of All India Trinamool Congress. He is an MLA, elected from the Jagatdal constituency in the 2021 West Bengal Legislative Assembly election.
