= Bijpur Assembly constituency =

Bijpur
- Constituency No. 103 for the West Bengal Legislative Assembly
- Interactive Map Outlining Bijpur Assembly Constituency

Constituency details
- Country: India
- Region: East India
- State: West Bengal
- District: North 24 Parganas
- Lok Sabha constituency: Barrackpore
- Established: 1951
- Total electors: 158,495
- Reservation: None

Member of Legislative Assembly
- 18th West Bengal Legislative Assembly
- Incumbent Sudipta Das
- Party: Bharatiya Janata Party
- Elected year: 2026

Party-wise wins in Bijpur Assembly constituency
1. Communist Party of India (Marxist) (9) (50.0%)
2. Indian National Congress (3) (16.7%)
3. All India Trinamool Congress (3) (16.7%)
4. Communist Party of India (2) (11.1%)
5. Bharatiya Janata Party (1) (5.56%)

Bijpur Assembly constituency is an assembly constituency in North 24 Parganas district in the Indian state of West Bengal.

== Overview ==
As per orders of the Delimitation Commission, No. 103 Bijpur Assembly constituency is composed of the following: Kanchrapara municipality and Halisahar municipality.

Bijpur Assembly constituency is part of No. 15 Barrackpore (Lok Sabha constituency).

== Members of the Legislative Assembly ==
Year	Name	Party
1951	Bipin Behari Ganguli	Indian National Congress
1957	Niranjan Sengupta	Communist Party of India
1962	Monoranjan Roy	Communist Party of India
1967	Jagadish Chandra Das	Communist Party of India (Marxist)
1969	Jagadish Chandra Das	Communist Party of India (Marxist)
1971	Jagadish Chandra Das	Indian National Congress
1972	Jagadish Chandra Das	Indian National Congress
1977	Jagadish Chandra Das	Communist Party of India (Marxist)
1982	Jagadish Chandra Das	Communist Party of India (Marxist)
1987	Jagadish Chandra Das	Communist Party of India (Marxist)
1991	Jagadish Chandra Das	Communist Party of India (Marxist)
1996	Kamal Sengupta Basu	Communist Party of India (Marxist)
2001	Jagadish Chandra Das	Communist Party of India (Marxist)
2006	Dr. Nirjharini Chakraborty	Communist Party of India (Marxist)
2011	Subhranshu Roy	Trinamool Congress
2016	Subhranshu Roy	Trinamool Congress
2021	Subodh Adhikary	Trinamool Congress
2026	Sudipta Das	Bharatiya Janata Party

== Election results ==
=== 2026 ===
2026 West Bengal Legislative Assembly election: Bijpur
Party	Candidate	Votes	%	±%
BJP	Sudipta Das	71,799	49.56	+11.26
AITC	Subodh Adhikary	58,456	40.35	−7.55
CPI(M)	Debasish Rakshit	10,009	6.91	−3.51
NOTA	None of the above	731	0.5	−0.38
Majority		13,343	9.21	−0.39
Turnout		144,886	91.4	+19.07
BJP gain from AITC		Swing		

=== 2021 ===
2021 West Bengal Legislative Assembly election: Bijpur
Party	Candidate	Votes	%	±%
AITC	Subodh Adhikary	66,625	47.9	
BJP	Subhranshu Roy	53,278	38.3	
CPI(M)	Sukanta Rakshit (Babin)	14,490	10.42	
SUCI(C)	Kalipada Debnath	1,542	1.11	
NOTA	None of the above	1,227	0.88	
Majority		13,347	9.6	
Turnout		139,096	72.33	
AITC hold		Swing		

=== 2016 ===
West Bengal assembly elections, 2016: Bijpur constituency
Party	Candidate	Votes	%	±%
AITC	Subhranshu Roy	76,744	61.58	+10.09
CPI(M)	Dr. Rabindra Nath Mukherjee	28,888	23.15	−18.42
BJP	Alo Rani Sarkar	13,723	11	+7.19
SUCI(C)	Kalipada Debnath	1,714		
None of the Above	None of the Above	1,483		
BSP	Krishna Gopal Majhi	1,001		
Majority		47,954	38.43	
Turnout		1,24,504	69.51	–10.73
AITC hold		Swing		

=== 2011 ===
In the 2011 elections, SubhransHu Roy of Trinamool Congress defeated his nearest rival Nirjharini Chakraborty of CPI(M).

West Bengal assembly elections, 2011: Bijpur constituency
Party	Candidate	Votes	%	±%
AITC	Subhranshu Roy	65,479	51.49	+4.57#
CPI(M)	Nirjharini Chakarborty	52,867	41.57	−11.08
BJP	Kamala Kanta Chowdhury	4,841	3.81	
Independent	Ramen Mallick	2,005		
BSP	Sarat Chandra Biswas	1,982		
Turnout		127,174	80.24	
AITC gain from CPI(M)		Swing	15.66%*	

.*Swing calculated on Congress+Trinamool Congress vote percentages taken together in 2006.

=== 2006 ===
In the 2006 state assembly elections Dr. Nirjharini Chakraborty of CPI(M) won the Bijpur seat defeating Kalyani Biswas (Basu) of Trinamool Congress. Contests in most years were multi cornered but only winners and runners are being mentioned. In 2001, Jagadish Chandra Das of CPI(M) won defeating Jagadish Das, son of Akul Das, of Trinamool Congress. Kamal Sengupta Basu of CPI(M) defeated Mrinal Kanti Singha Roy of Congress in 1996. Jagadish Chandra Das of CPI(M) defeated Bimalananda Dutta of Congress in 1991 and 1987, Prabir Bandopadhyay of Congress in 1982 and Jagadish Chandra Das, s/o Akul in 1977.

=== 1972 ===
Jagadish Chandra Das, s/o Akul, of Congress won in 1972 and 1971. Jagadish Chandra Das of CPI(M) won in 1969 and 1967. Monoranjan Roy of CPI won in 1962.Niranjan Sengupta of CPI won in 1957 and in independent India's first election in 1951.
