= Suresh Chandra Pal =

Indian politician

Suresh Chandra Pal (died 1965) was an Indian politician belonging to the Indian National Congress. Pal was a municipal commissioner in Naihati between 1931 and 1949. In 1949, he served as chairman of the municipality. He won the Naihati constituency seat in the 1952 West Bengal Legislative Assembly election, standing as an Indian National Congress candidate. In 1960, Pal was elected to the West Bengal Legislative Council, representing the 24-Parganas Local Authorities Constituency. Pal died in 1965, at the age of 65.
