= Ramananda Das =

Indian politician

Member of Parliament, Lok Sabha
- In office 1952-1957
- Succeeded by: Bimal Comar Ghosh
- Constituency: Barrackpore, West Bengal

Personal details
- Born: 1 July 1913 Tajpur, Rajshahi district, Bengal Presidency, British India
- Died: 16 July 1972 (aged 59) Calcutta, India
- Party: Indian National Congress

Ramananda Das (1913-1972) was an Indian politician. He was elected to the Lok Sabha, lower house of the Parliament of India from Barrackpore, West Bengal as a member of the Indian National Congress. He was a social worker and trade union leader. He represented India in ILO Conferences, at San Francisco in 1948 and at Geneva in 1951.
