= Mukul Roy =

Indian politician (1954–2026)

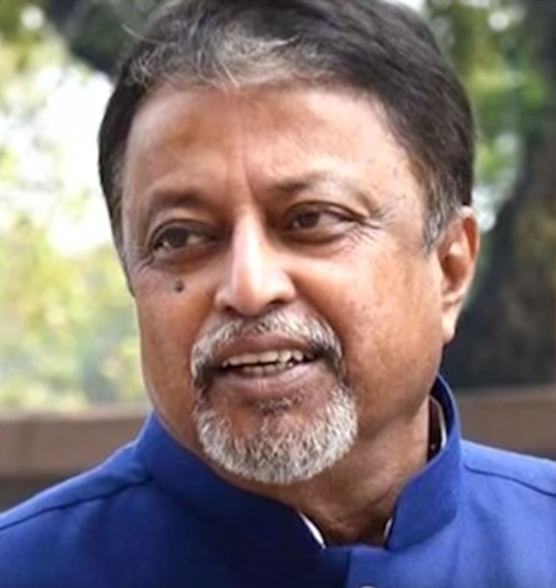
- Roy in 2016

Member of West Bengal Legislative Assembly
- In office 2 May 2021 – 23 February 2026
- Preceded by: Abani Mohan Joardar
- Succeeded by: Tarak Nath Chatterjee
- Constituency: Krishnanagar Uttar

Chairman of Public Accounts Committee of West Bengal Legislative Assembly
- In office 14 July 2021 – 28 June 2022
- Appointed by: Biman Banerjee
- Preceded by: Shankar Singha
- Succeeded by: Krishna Kalyani

Union Minister of Railways
- In office 20 March 2012 – 21 September 2012
- Prime Minister: Manmohan Singh
- Preceded by: Dinesh Trivedi
- Succeeded by: C. P. Joshi

Union Minister of State
- In office 19 May 2011 – 12 July 2011
- Prime Minister: Manmohan Singh
- Minister: Dinesh Trivedi
- Ministry & Department: Railways
- In office 2009–2011
- Prime Minister: Manmohan Singh
- Minister: G. K. Vasan
- Ministry & Department: Shipping

Member of Parliament, Rajya Sabha
- In office 3 April 2006 – 11 October 2017
- Succeeded by: Abir Biswas
- Constituency: West Bengal

National Vice-President of Bharatiya Janata Party
- In office 2020–2021

National General Secretary of All India Trinamool Congress
- In office 1998–2015

Personal details
- Born: 17 April 1954 Kanchrapara, West Bengal, India
- Died: 23 February 2026 (aged 71) Kolkata, West Bengal, India
- Party: All India Trinamool Congress (1998–2017, 2021–2026)
- Other political affiliations: Indian National Congress (until 1998); Bharatiya Janata Party (2017–2021)
- Spouse: Krishna Roy (m. 1980; died 2021)
- Children: Subhranshu Roy
- Education: University of Calcutta; Madurai Kamaraj University
- Occupation: Politician

Mukul Roy (17 April 1954 – 23 February 2026) was an Indian politician from West Bengal. He served as a Minister of State in the Shipping Ministry and later Ministry of Railways during the second UPA government. Before the creation of All India Trinamool Congress, he was a member of Indian National Congress. Between 2017 and 2021, Roy left All India Trinamool Congress to join Bharatiya Janata Party. In 2021, he left BJP and joined AITC. On 13 November 2025, his MLA post was terminated by Calcutta High Court for tergiversation. After Mamata Banerjee resigned as the Railway Minister to become the Chief Minister of West Bengal, Roy was handed additional charge of the Ministry of Railways after Mamata expressed her desire that her party retain the Ministry of Railways and personally recommended Roy to Prime Minister Manmohan Singh.

Roy resigned from All India Trinamool Congress on 25 September 2017; later he was suspended from the party for six years for anti-party activities. He also resigned from Rajya Sabha membership on 11 October 2017. He rejoined AITC on 11 June 2021 along with his son in presence of Mamata Banerjee.

== Educational qualifications ==
Roy did his Bachelor of Science from the University of Calcutta. He also earned an MA degree in public administration from the Madurai Kamaraj University in 2006.

== Political career ==
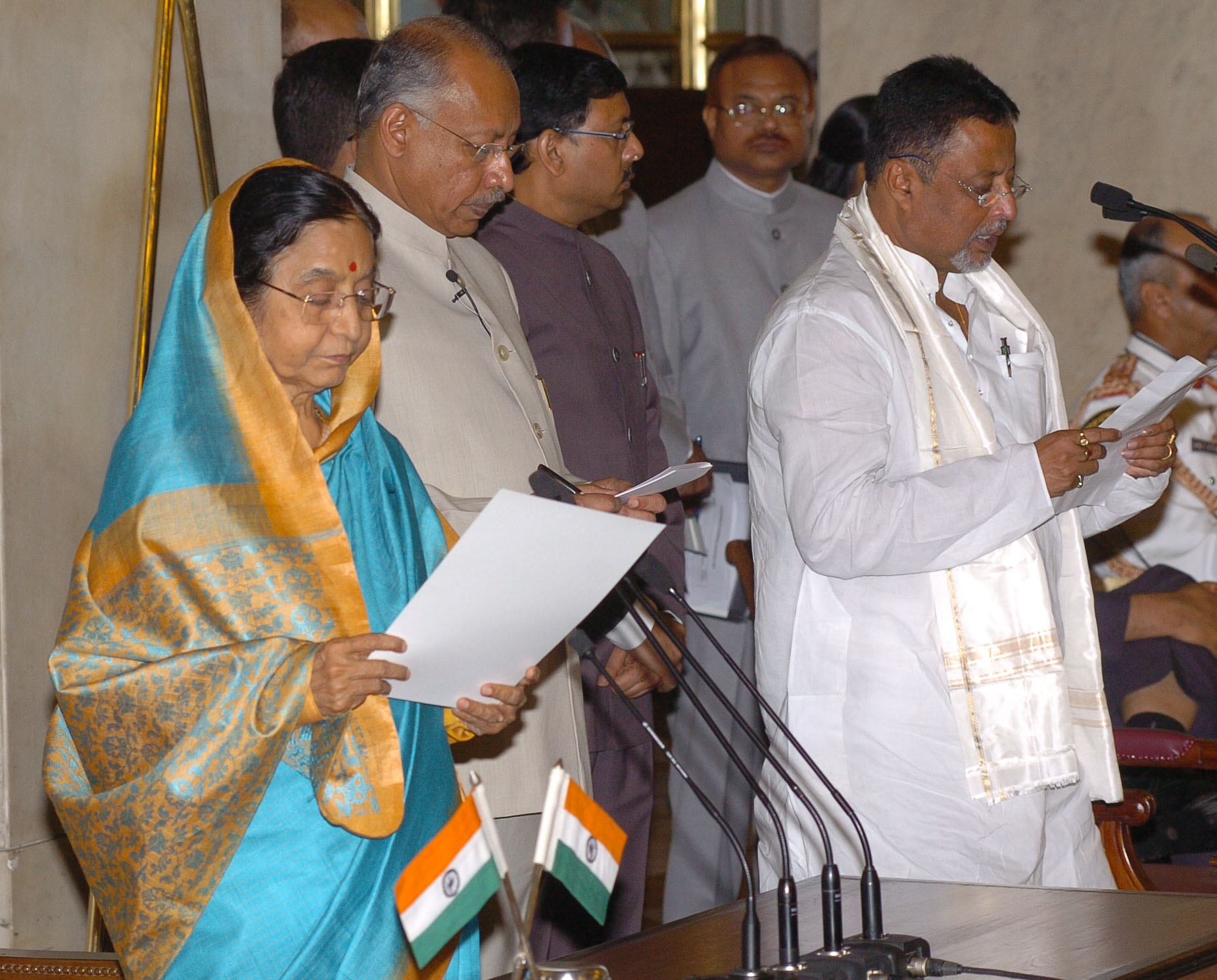
The President Pratibha Patil administering the oath as Minister of State to Mukul Roy at Rashtrapati Bhavan, New Delhi on 28 May 2009.

Roy started his political career as Youth Congress leader and became close to Mamata Banerjee who was also associated with Youth Congress.

=== All India Trinamool Congress ===
Roy was a founding member of All India Trinamool Congress which was formed in January 1998 as a breakaway faction of the Indian National Congress led by Mamata Banerjee. Soon, he became the party's face in New Delhi and was made general secretary in 2006.

In 2001 West Bengal Legislative Assembly election, he was TMC candidate from Jagatdal constituency and got 56,741 votes but lost.

In April 2006, Roy was elected to Rajya Sabha and was a leader of All India Trinamool Congress from 28 May 2009 to 20 March 2012 in Rajya Sabha. In UPA II he was appointed Minister of State in the Ministry of Shipping first, then Minister of State in the Ministry of Railways when Mamata Banerjee resigned.

On 11 July 2011, when Prime Minister Manmohan Singh directed Mukul Roy to visit the site of the derailment of the Guwahati-Puri Express in Assam, he openly defied him. This brought a lot of displeasure among the political circles and he was shunted out of the Railways portfolio in the latest cabinet reshuffle on 12 July 2011.

In 2012, he was the subject of a controversy regarding the Railway Budget. This happened after Mamata Banerjee expressed her discontent with the increase in passenger fares, and demanded the resignation of Dinesh Trivedi, Railway Minister.

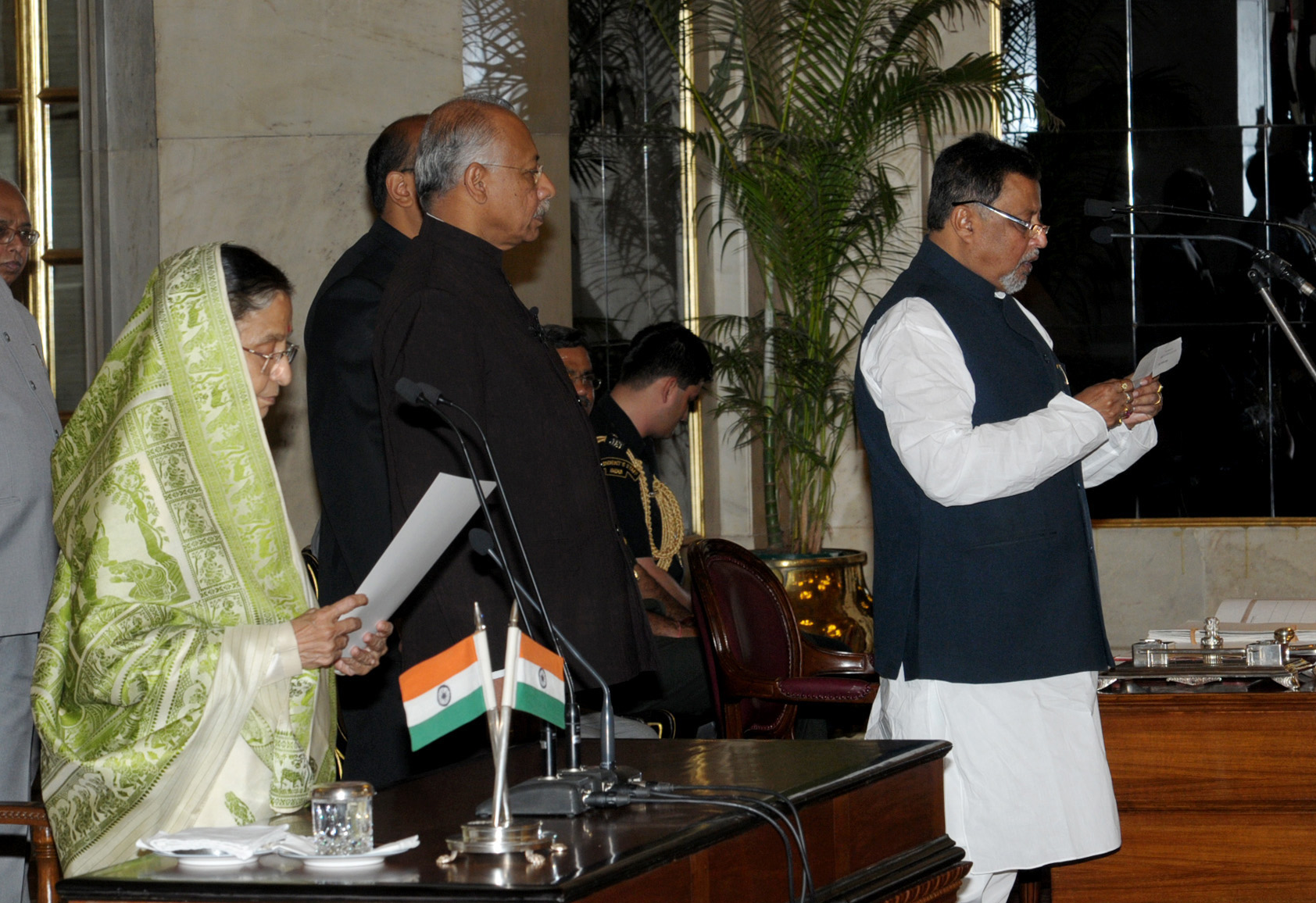
The President Pratibha Patil administering the oath as Cabinet Minister to Mukul Roy at Rashtrapati Bhavan, New Delhi on 20 March 2012.

After Dinesh resigned, Mukul became the Railway Minister of India and he removed the fare hike introduced by the former Railway Minister Dinesh Trivedi, to much criticism. With the exit of Trinamool from UPA coalition due to an allowance of 51% FDI in retail and aviation sector, Mukul Roy's tenure of railway minister came to an end in the month of September 2012.

Roy ran a special train called "DU Gyan Uday Express" a Bengali worded statement, which took 1000 students of Delhi University to places like Ahmedabad, Mumbai, Goa and Bangalore during the summer break of 2012.

An application has been submitted to the Election Commission for the formation of the new political party called All India Trinamool Congress and Mukul aide Amitabha Majumdar has been named as the President. The head office of the party is located in Dinhata, in North Bengal.

Roy and Mamata had a fall out in 2015 when his name came up in Saradha scam as well as in Narada sting operation in which TMC leaders are involved.

He was suspended from the party for six years as he met senior BJP leaders like Finance Minister Arun Jaitley and BJP general secretary Kailash Vijayvargiya. He has resigned from Trinamool Congress on 25 September 2017. After that Roy also resigned from Rajya Sabha membership on 11 October 2017.

=== Bharatiya Janata Party ===
Roy formally joined the Bharatiya Janata Party on 3 November 2017. Upon joining the party, he said that he felt proud of working under Prime Minister Narendra Modi. He contested the 2021 West Bengal Legislative Assembly election and won.

=== "Rejoining" Trinamool Congress ===
On 11 June 2021, Roy rejoined the All India Trinamool Congress along with his son Subhranshu Roy in the presence of Mamata Banerjee and others. On 25 June 2021, he was elected as a member of PAC by the speaker of West Bengal Legislative Assembly and later became the chairman of the PAC on 14 July 2021.

Roy set foot in Krishnanagar, his constituency. He first came to Krishnanagar Bhatjangla on 27 June 2021. He was then greeted by All India Trinamool Congress activists wearing a wreath. Soon after, a quarrel broke out between All India Trinamool Congress activists over the reception of Mukul Roy.

On 19 January 2022, his lawyer told the Speaker that he was still in the BJP and he never rejoined the ruling Trinamool Congress party. Accordingly, the Speaker dismissed Roy's disqualification as legislator under anti-defection law.

== Death ==
Mukul Roy had been suffering from Parkinson's disease and Dementia disease for few years. Brain surgery was also performed due to the problem of Hydrocephalus in the brain. He was hospitalized multiple times in 2024. Roy died on 23 February 2026, at the age of 71.
