= Partha Bhowmick =

Indian politician (born 1964)

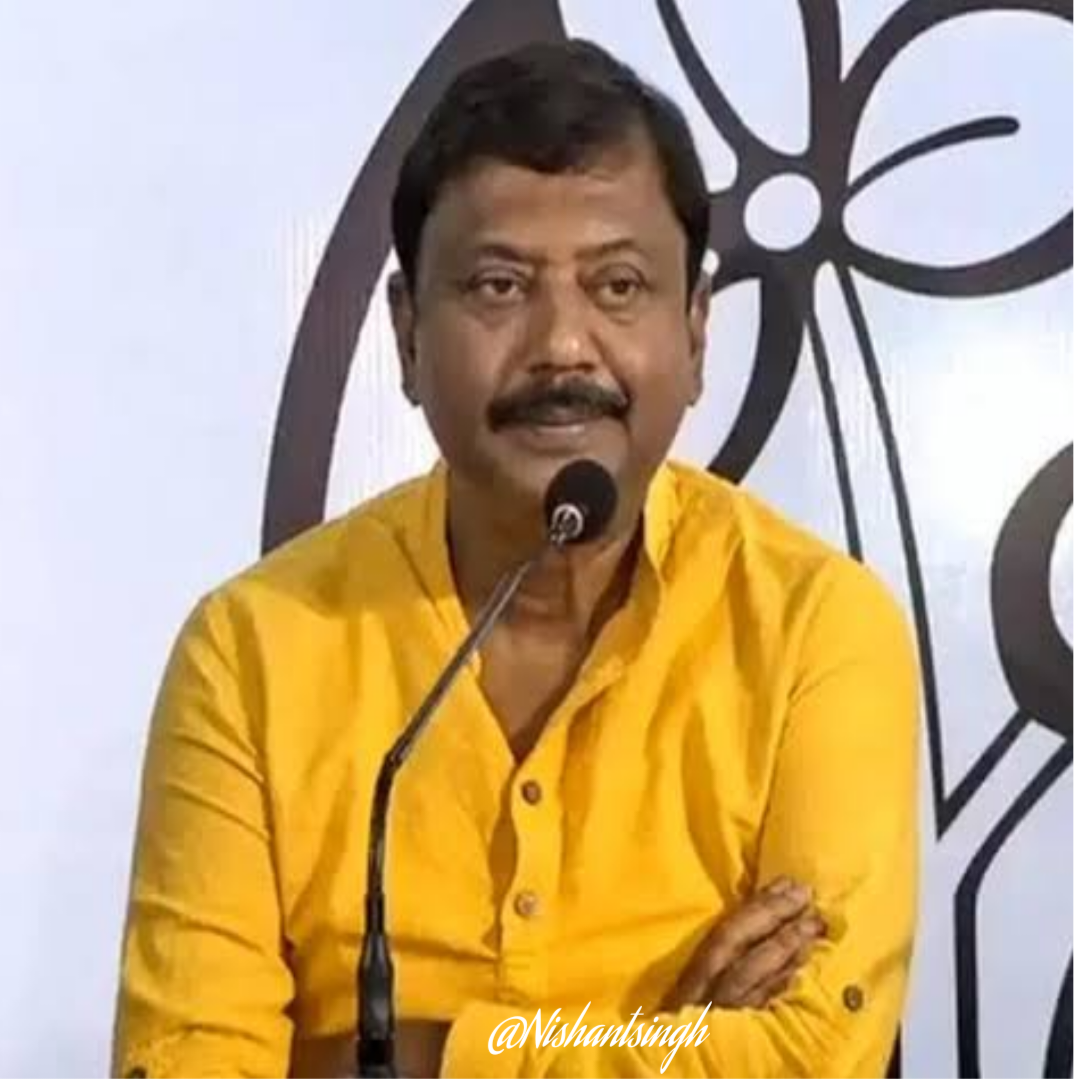

Member of Parliament, Lok Sabha
- Incumbent
- Assumed office 25 June 2024
- Preceded by: Arjun Singh
- Constituency: Barrackpore

West Bengal Minister of Public Enterprises and Industrial Reconstruction
- In office 17 February 2024 – 8 August 2024
- Chief Minister: Mamata Banerjee
- Preceded by: Jyotipriyo Mullick
- Succeeded by: Babul Supriyo

West Bengal Minister of Irrigation and Waterways
- In office 3 August 2022 – 8 August 2024
- Chief Minister: Mamata Banerjee
- Preceded by: Soumen Mahapatra
- Succeeded by: Manas Bhunia

Member of the West Bengal Legislative Assembly
- In office 25 May 2011 – 23 June 2024
- Preceded by: Ranjit Kundu
- Succeeded by: Sanat Dey
- Constituency: Naihati

Personal details
- Born: 22 January 1964 (age 62) Naihati, West Bengal, India
- Party: Nationalist Citizens Party of India (2026–present)
- Other political affiliations: Trinamool Congress (till 2026)
- Spouse: Nutan Sarkar
- Children: 1
- Education: M.Com.
- Alma mater: Rishi Bankim Chandra College (1987)
- Profession: Businessman
- Other offices: 2021–2022: District Party President of Trinamool Congress from North 24 Parganas; 2019–2021: Whip of West Bengal Legislative Assembly

Partha Bhowmick (born 22 January 1964) is an Indian politician and theatre artist who has served as Member of Parliament (MP) in Lok Sabha for Barrackpore since the 2024 general election. A member of NCPI he previously served as Member of the Legislative Assembly (MLA) in West Bengal Assembly from Naihati between 2011 and 2024.

Bhowmick served in various positions in the West Bengal Government since 2019, including as cabinet minister under Chief Minister Mamata Banerjee between 2022 and 2024.

== Political career ==
He contested the 2024 Lok Sabha election from the Trinamool Congress from Jhargram Lok Sabha constituency and won to became first time Member of Parliament.

=== 2026 Rebellion ===
In June 2026, almost immediately after the massive Trinamool Congress defeat, around 20 MPs of TMC allegedly declared rebellion from their Party, and presented their written wish to join Bhartiya Janata Party. This group was led by Kakoli Ghosh.

Later, on 14 June, 20 MPs, including Bhowmick, signed a formal letter declaring their split from Trinamool Congress as to merge with the Nationalist Citizen Party of India (NCPI). They formally submitted the letter to Lok Sabha Speaker Om Birla.

The total strength of TMC in Lok Sabha had been 28, so that a number of 20 MPS made it eligible for splitting from the Party, as per the Indian Defection laws, so as to escape the anti-defection disqualification.

== Acting career ==
Bhowmick has been a theatre artist for several years. He performed in group theatre prior to entering politics.

=== Filmography ===
Year	Film	Role	Language	Note
2023	Abar Proloy	Inspector Karali	Bengali	Web Series
2025	Aarii	Trilok Halder	Bengali	Film
2026	Hok Kolorob	Police Officer	Bengali	Film
2026	Lawho Gouranger Naam Rey	Sri Ramakrishna Paramhansa	Bengali	Film
