= Bhatpara Assembly constituency =

Bhatpara
- Constituency No. 105 for the West Bengal Legislative Assembly
- Interactive Map Outlining Bhatpara Assembly Constituency

Constituency details
- Country: India
- Region: East India
- State: West Bengal
- District: North 24 Parganas
- Lok Sabha constituency: Barrackpore
- Established: 1951
- Total electors: 149,164
- Reservation: None

Member of Legislative Assembly
- 18th West Bengal Legislative Assembly
- Incumbent Pawan Kumar Singh
- Party: BJP
- Alliance: NDA
- Elected year: 2026

Bhatpara Assembly constituency is an assembly constituency in North 24 Parganas district in the Indian state of West Bengal.

== Overview ==
As per orders of the Delimitation Commission, No. 105 Bhatpara Assembly constituency is composed of the following: Ward Nos.1 to 17 of Bhatpara municipality.

Bhatpara Assembly constituency is part of No. 15 Barrackpore (Lok Sabha constituency).

== Members of the Legislative Assembly ==
Year	Name	Party
1951	Dayaram Beri	Indian National Congress
1957	Sitaram Gupta	Communist Party of India
1962	Dayaram Beri	Indian National Congress
1967	Dayaram Beri	Indian National Congress
1969	Sitaram Gupta	Communist Party of India (Marxist)
1971	Satyanarayan Singh	Indian National Congress
1972	Satyanarayan Singh	Indian National Congress
1977	Sitaram Gupta	Communist Party of India (Marxist)
1982	Sitaram Gupta	Communist Party of India (Marxist)
1987	Satyanarayan Singh	Indian National Congress
1991	Bidyut Ganguly	Communist Party of India (Marxist)
1996	Bidyut Ganguly	Communist Party of India (Marxist)
2001	Arjun Singh	Trinamool Congress
2006	Arjun Singh	Trinamool Congress
2011	Arjun Singh	Trinamool Congress
2016	Arjun Singh	Trinamool Congress
2019^	Pawan Singh	Bharatiya Janata Party
2021	Pawan Singh	Bharatiya Janata Party
2026	Pawan Singh	Bharatiya Janata Party

== Election results ==
Vote share of Winning candidates
2026	58.02%
2021	53.40%
2019 by-poll	58.50%
2016	54.57%
2011	70.94%
2006	61.48%
2001	55.31%
1996	49.61%
1991	50.92%
1987	51.58%
1982	49.47%
1977	63.39%
1972	57.66%
1971	49.88%
1969	49.80%
1967	49.45%
1962	56.15%
1957	39.83%
1952	74.65%

=== 2026 ===
2026 West Bengal Legislative Assembly election: Bhatpara
Party	Candidate	Votes	%	±%
BJP	Pawan Kumar Singh	61,683	58.02	▲4.62
AITC	Amit Gupta	38,876	36.57	▼4.06
CPI(M)	Ash Narayan Singh	2,969	2.79	
NOTA	None of the above	939	0.88	▼0.20
IND	Abdullah Khan Saheb	444	0.42	
INC	Dharmendra Shaw	439	0.41	▼1.61
BSP	Sadananda Rajak	397	0.37	▼0.27
SUCI(C)	Sujit Bose	246	0.23	▼0.32
IND	Pawan Kumar Singh	199	0.19	
IND	Gaurab Prasad	122	0.11	
Majority		22,807	21.45	▲8.68
Turnout		106,314	90.49	▲20.90
BJP hold		Swing		

=== 2021 ===
2021 West Bengal Legislative Assembly election: Bhatpara
Party	Candidate	Votes	%	±%
BJP	Pawan Kumar Singh	57,244	53.40	▼5.10
AITC	Jitendra Shaw (Jitu)	43,557	40.63	▲5.39
INC	Dharmendra Shaw	2,169	2.02	▲1.27
NOTA	None of the above	1,160	1.08	
IND	Vinod Kishor Verma	744	0.69	
BSP	Ajay Kumar Ram	682	0.64	
IND	Sabari Chowdhury	610	0.57	
SUCI(C)	Partha Bhattacharyya	592	0.55	
IND	Muneel Kumar Rajak	248	0.23	
IND	Uday Veer Choudhury	191	0.18	
Majority		13,687	12.77	▼10.49
Turnout		107,197	69.59	
BJP hold		Swing		

=== 2019 by-election ===
2019 West Bengal Legislative Assembly by-election: Bhatpara
Party	Candidate	Votes	%	±%
BJP	Pawan Kumar Singh	58,119	58.50	▲45.30
AITC	Madan Mitra	35,015	35.24	▼19.33
CPI(M)	Ranjit Kumar Mandal	3,589	3.61	
IND	Saikat Kumar Dey	796	0.80	
INC	Khwaja Ahmed Hussain	746	0.75	
IND	Santu Dey	725	0.73	
IND	Sanjay Singh	138	0.14	
IND	Goutam Maity	68	0.07	
IND	Ritesh Kumar Singh	59	0.06	
IND	Dharmendra Singh	36	0.04	
IND	Pramod Singh	34	0.03	
IND	Debraj Ghosh	30	0.03	
Majority		23,104	23.26	▼3.39
Turnout		99,355		
BJP gain from AITC		Swing		

=== 2016 ===
2016 West Bengal Legislative Assembly election: Bhatpara
Party	Candidate	Votes	%	±%
AITC	Arjun Singh	59,253	54.57	▼16.37
IND	Jitendra Shaw (Jitu)	30,318	27.92	
BJP	Rumesh Kumar Handa	14,333	13.20	▲10.98
NOTA	None of the above	2,015	1.86	
IND	Gopal Raut	788	0.73	
SUCI(C)	Partha Bhattacharyya	688	0.63	
IND	Dharmendra Singh	678	0.62	
IND	Shatrughna Singh	504	0.46	
Majority		28,935	26.65	▼20.39
Turnout		108,577	75.02	▼1.38
AITC hold		Swing		

=== 2011 ===
2011 West Bengal Legislative Assembly election: Bhatpara
Party	Candidate	Votes	%	±%
AITC	Arjun Singh	66,938	70.94	▲9.46
CPI(M)	Nepaldeb Bhattacharyya	22,553	23.90	▼2.58
BJP	Pradyot Kumar Chowdhury	2,099	2.22	
IND	Manoj Kumar Chatterjee	1,632	1.73	
BSP	Sushanto Barai	637	0.68	▼0.20
IND	Gopal Rout	494	0.52	
Majority		44,385	47.04	▲12.04
Turnout		94,353	76.40	
AITC hold		Swing		

=== 2006 ===
2006 West Bengal Legislative Assembly election: Bhatpara
Party	Candidate	Votes	%	±%
AITC	Arjun Singh	50,368	61.48	▲6.17
CPI(M)	Harimohan Nath	21,692	26.48	▼11.45
INC	Reba Raha	5,391	6.58	
IND	Birendra Shaw	2,124	2.59	
BSP	Pulin Bihari Sarkar	722	0.88	▲0.06
IND	Amal Kumar Sen	499	0.61	
IND	Dilip Shaw	400	0.49	
IND	Pradip Kumar Sah	232	0.28	
IND	Dharmendra Singh	206	0.25	
IND	Gopal Raut	181	0.22	
IND	Kamleswar Prasad	115	0.14	
Majority		28,676	35.00	▲17.62
Turnout		81,930		
AITC hold		Swing		

=== 2001 ===
2001 West Bengal Legislative Assembly election: Bhatpara
Party	Candidate	Votes	%	±%
AITC	Arjun Singh	53,467	55.31	
CPI(M)	Ramprasad Kundu	36,669	37.93	▼11.68
IND	Hiralal Verma	1,974	2.04	
IND	Sanjay Singh	1,019	1.05	
SP	Narendra Pratap Misra	918	0.95	
BSP	Sankar Prasad	794	0.82	▼1.00
NCP	Ram Asray Shaw	585	0.61	
IND	9 Independent Candidates	1,247	1.28	
Majority		16,798	17.38	▲3.35
Turnout		96,691	67.09	▼4.81
AITC gain from CPI(M)		Swing		

=== 1996 ===
1996 West Bengal Legislative Assembly election: Bhatpara
Party	Candidate	Votes	%	±%
CPI(M)	Bidyut Ganguli	48,232	49.61	▼1.31
INC	Dharmpal Gupta	34,592	35.58	▼1.83
BJP	Uma Sankar Singh	11,711	12.05	▲4.47
BSP	Sefali Sarkar	1,770	1.82	▲0.30
IND	Atwari Das	447	0.46	
IND	Rupai Kewat	208	0.21	
IND	Arjun Chowhan	136	0.14	
IND	Krishna Shaw	127	0.13	
Majority		13,640	14.03	▲0.52
Turnout		99,909	71.90	▲5.68
CPI(M) hold		Swing		

=== 1991 ===
1991 West Bengal Legislative Assembly election: Bhatpara
Party	Candidate	Votes	%	±%
CPI(M)	Bidyt Ganguly	43,788	50.92	▲4.92
INC	Kedar Singh	32,175	37.41	▼14.17
BJP	Krishnanandy Tiwari	6,516	7.58	▲6.95
IND	Gorakh Nath Mishra	1,363	1.58	
BSP	Abul Kashim	1,311	1.52	
JP	Vikas Chandra Dube	343	0.40	
BPI	Sita Seth	335	0.39	
DDP	Yogendras Singh	166	0.19	
Majority		11,613	13.51	▲7.93
Turnout		87,894	66.22	▼6.39
CPI(M) gain from INC		Swing		

=== 1987 ===
1987 West Bengal Legislative Assembly election: Bhatpara
Party	Candidate	Votes	%	±%
INC	Satyanaryan Singh	47,229	51.58	▲2.90
CPI(M)	Siva Prasad Bhattacharya	42,121	46.00	▼3.47
IND	Sita Seth	697	0.76	
IND	Naresh Sarkar	688	0.75	
BJP	Krishnanand Tiwari	579	0.63	
IND	Nathuni Ray	248	0.27	
Majority		5,108	5.58	▲4.80
Turnout		93,321	72.61	▲4.86
INC gain from CPI(M)		Swing		

=== 1982 ===
1982 West Bengal Legislative Assembly election: Bhatpara
Party	Candidate	Votes	%	±%
CPI(M)	Sitaram Gupta	38,656	49.47	▼13.92
INC	Debi Ghosal	38,045	48.68	▲29.80
LKD	Atwari Dass	801	1.03	
IND	Nripen Chowdhury	644	0.82	
Majority		611	0.78	▼43.73
Turnout		79,881	67.75	▲23.46
CPI(M) hold		Swing		

=== 1977 ===
1977 West Bengal Legislative Assembly election: Bhatpara
Party	Candidate	Votes	%	±%
CPI(M)	Sita Ram Gupta	33,105	63.39	▲21.56
INC	Satya Narain Singh	9,860	18.88	▼38.78
JP	Baidyanath Ray	4,297	8.23	
IND	Jadubans Singh	4,243	8.13	
IND	Omprakash Gupta	292	0.56	
IND	Dube Vikas Chandra Sakal Narayan	256	0.49	
IND	Haraprasad Bhattacharya	168	0.32	
Majority		23,245	44.51	▲28.68
Turnout		53,205	44.29	▼30.98
CPI(M) gain from INC		Swing		

=== 1972 ===
1972 West Bengal Legislative Assembly election: Bhatpara
Party	Candidate	Votes	%	±%
INC	Satyanarayan Singha	49,187	57.66	▲7.78
CPI(M)	Sita Ram Gupta	35,680	41.83	▼4.86
ABJS	Lal Bahadur Singha	440	0.52	
Majority		13,507	15.83	▲12.64
Turnout		86,744	75.27	▲2.17
INC gain from CPI(M)		Swing		

=== 1971 ===
1971 West Bengal Legislative Assembly election: Bhatpara
Party	Candidate	Votes	%	±%
INC	Satyanarayan Singh	40,173	49.88	▲3.40
CPI(M)	Sitaram Gupta	37,603	46.69	▼3.11
AIFB	Shew Kumar Singh	1,704	2.12	
INC(O)	Daraga Singh	1,053	1.31	
Majority		2,570	3.19	▼0.13
Turnout		82,983	73.10	▲6.08
INC gain from CPI(M)		Swing		

=== 1969 ===
1969 West Bengal Legislative Assembly election: Bhatpara
Party	Candidate	Votes	%	±%
CPI(M)	Sitaram Gupta	33,554	49.80	▲7.67
INC	Dayaram Beri	31,318	46.48	▼2.97
LKD	Om Prakash Gupta	1,447	2.15	
RPI	Siw Nath Rabidas	719	1.07	
NDF	Dinabandhu Ghosh	343	0.51	
Majority		2,236	3.32	▼4.00
Turnout		68,427	67.02	▲2.56
CPI(M) gain from INC		Swing		

=== 1967 ===
1967 West Bengal Legislative Assembly election: Bhatpara
Party	Candidate	Votes	%	±%
INC	D. Beri	32,027	49.45	▼6.70
CPI(M)	S. Gupta	27,281	42.13	
IND	J. Gupta	1,858	2.87	
CPI	S. Seth	1,286	1.99	▼39.72
IND	B. B. Banerjee	1,217	1.88	
IND	K. Chattopadhyaya	630	0.97	
PSP	B. Keshari	463	0.71	
Majority		4,746	7.32	▼7.12
Turnout		66,643	64.46	▲8.85
INC hold		Swing		

=== 1962 ===
1962 West Bengal Legislative Assembly election: Bhatpara
Party	Candidate	Votes	%	±%
INC	Dayaram Begi	23,261	56.15	▲17.11
CPI	Sita Ram Gupta	17,279	41.71	▲1.88
IND	Munshi Bakridan	508	1.23	
IND	Sita Sett	381	0.92	
Majority		5,982	14.44	▲13.65
Turnout		42,444	55.61	▲14.78
INC gain from CPI		Swing		

=== 1957 ===
1957 West Bengal Legislative Assembly election: Bhatpara
Party	Candidate	Votes	%	±%
CPI	Sitaram Gupta	9,417	39.83	
INC	Dayaram Beri	9,231	39.04	▼35.61
IND	Niharendu Dutta Majumder	2,828	11.96	
IND	Ramprasad Sha	1,619	6.85	
IND	Bhola Bhar	332	1.40	
IND	Gadai Chandra Das	215	0.91	
Majority		186	0.79	▼63.41
Turnout		23,642	40.83	▼5.53
CPI gain from INC		Swing		

=== 1952 ===
1952 West Bengal Legislative Assembly election: Bhatpara
Party	Candidate	Votes	%	±%
INC	Dayaram Beri	19,029	74.65	
BPI	Sita Seth	2,664	10.45	
ABJS	Benoy Mozumdar	2,538	9.96	
KMPP	Birendra Narayan Neogi	500	1.96	
RRP	Sita Ram Sing	389	1.53	
IND	Shibdas Ghosh	189	0.74	
IND	Sanichar Das	181	0.71	
Majority		16,365	64.20	
Turnout		25,490	46.36	
INC win (new seat)				
