= Noapara Assembly constituency =

Noapara
- Constituency No. 107 for the West Bengal Legislative Assembly
- Interactive Map Outlining Noapara Assembly Constituency

Constituency details
- Country: India
- Region: East India
- State: West Bengal
- District: North 24 Parganas
- Lok Sabha constituency: Barrackpore
- Established: 1957
- Total electors: 246,881
- Reservation: None

Member of Legislative Assembly
- 18th West Bengal Legislative Assembly
- Incumbent Arjun Singh
- Party: BJP
- Alliance: NDA
- Elected year: 2026

Noapara Assembly constituency is an assembly constituency in North 24 Parganas district in the Indian state of West Bengal.

== Overview ==
As per orders of the Delimitation Commission, No. 107 Noapara Assembly constituency is composed of the following: North Barrackpur municipality, Garulia municipality, Ichhapur Defence Estate, Barrackpur Cantonment, Mohanpur and Sewli gram panchayats of Barrackpore II community development block.

Noapara Assembly constituency is part of No. 15 Barrackpore (Lok Sabha constituency).

== Members of the Legislative Assembly ==
Year	Name	Party
1957	Panchanan Bhattacharjee	Praja Socialist Party
1962	Jamini Bhusan Saha	Communist Party of India
1967	Suvendu Roy	Indian National Congress
1969	Jamini Bhusan Saha	Communist Party of India (Marxist)
1971	Jamini Bhusan Saha	Communist Party of India (Marxist)
1972	Suvendu Roy	Indian National Congress
1977	Jamini Bhusan Saha	Communist Party of India (Marxist)
1982	Jamini Bhusan Saha	Communist Party of India (Marxist)
1987	Jamini Bhusan Saha	Communist Party of India (Marxist)
1991	Madan Mohan Nath	Communist Party of India (Marxist)
1996	Madan Mohan Nath	Communist Party of India (Marxist)
2001	Manju Basu	Trinamool Congress
2006	Kushadhwaj Ghosh	Communist Party of India (Marxist)
2011	Manju Basu	Trinamool Congress
2016	Madhusudan Ghose	Indian National Congress
2018^	Sunil Singh	Trinamool Congress
2021	Manju Basu	Trinamool Congress
2026	Arjun Singh	Bharatiya Janata Party

== Election results ==
=== 2026 ===
2026 West Bengal Legislative Assembly election: Noapara
Party	Candidate	Votes	%	±%
BJP	Arjun Singh	94,415	48.37	+13.33
AITC	Trinankur Bhattacharjee	76,759	39.33	−9.57
CPI(M)	Gargi Chatterjee	17,696	9.07	
INC	Ashok Bhattacharya	1,922	0.98	−11.22
NOTA	None of the above	1,372	0.70	−0.80
Majority		17,656	9.04	−4.82
Turnout		195,177	91.11	+17.63
BJP hold		Swing		

=== 2021 ===
West Bengal Assembly Elections, 2021: Noapara constituency
Party	Candidate	Votes	%	±%
AITC	Manju Basu	94,203	48.9	
BJP	Sunil Singh	67,493	35.04	
INC	Subhankar Sarkar	23,502	12.2	
NOTA	None of the above	2,886	1.5	
Majority		26,710	13.86	
Turnout		192,634	73.48	
AITC hold		Swing		

=== 2018 ===
Sunil Singh defeated his nearest rival Sandeep Banerjee of BJP on Noapara by polls with a margin of 63,018 votes with this All India Trinamool Congress snatched the seat from Congress.

By-election, 2018: Noapara
Party	Candidate	Votes	%	±%
AITC	Sunil Singh	101,729	53.51	+11.51
BJP	Sandeep Banerjee	38,711	20.36	+7.36
CPI(M)	Gargi Chatterjee	35,497	18.67	N/A
INC	Gautam Bose	10,527	5.53	−37.47
NOTA	None of the above	3,627	1.90	
Majority		63,018	33.15	
Turnout		1,90,091		
Registered electors		2,46,881		
AITC gain from INC		Swing	+24.49	

=== 2016 ===
In the 2016 election, Madhusudan Ghose of the Indian National Congress defeated incumbent Manju Basu of the Trinamool Congress.

West Bengal Assembly Elections, 2016: Noapara constituency
Party	Candidate	Votes	%	±%
INC	Madhusudan Ghose	79,548	43.00	n/a
AITC	Manju Basu	78,453	42.00	−17.03
BJP	Amiya Sarkar	23,579	13.00	+8.53
BSP	Bulu Sarkar			
Independent	Uday Veer Choudhury			
Turnout		185,957		
INC gain from AITC		Swing		

=== 2011 ===
In the 2011 election, Manju Basu of Trinamool Congress defeated her nearest rival K. D. Ghosh of CPI(M).

West Bengal assembly elections, 2011: Noapara constituency
Party	Candidate	Votes	%	±%
AITC	Manju Basu	100,369	59.03	+8.60#
CPI(M)	Dr. K. D. Ghosh	59,221	34.83	−12.90
BJP	Swapan Halder	7,594	4.47	
BSP	Krishna Chandra Sarkar	2,837		
Turnout		170,021	83.48	
AITC gain from CPI(M)		Swing	21.50#	

.# Swing calculated on Congress+Trinamool Congress vote percentages taken together in 2006.

=== 2006 ===
In the 2006 state assembly elections, Kushadhwaj Ghosh of CPI(M) won the Noapara assembly seat in 2006 defeating Manju Basu of Trinamool Congress. Contests in most years were multi cornered but only winners and runners are being mentioned. In 2001, Manju Basu of Trinamool Congress defeated Madan Mohan Nath of CPI (M). Madan Mohan Nath of CPI (M) defeated Sris Das of Congress in 1996 and Ananta Roy of Congress in 1991. Jamini Bhusan Saha of CPI (M) defeated Sris Das of Congress in 1986, and Apurba Bhattachaya of ICS in 1981 and Congress in 1977.

=== 1972 ===
Suvendu Roy of Congress won in 1972. Jamini Bhusan Saha of CPI(M) won in 1971 and 1969. Suvendu Roy of Congress won in 1967. Jamini Bhusan Saha of CPI won in 1962. Panchanan Bhattacharjee of PSP won in 1957. Prior to that the constituency was not there.
