= Dinesh Trivedi =

Indian politician (born 1950)

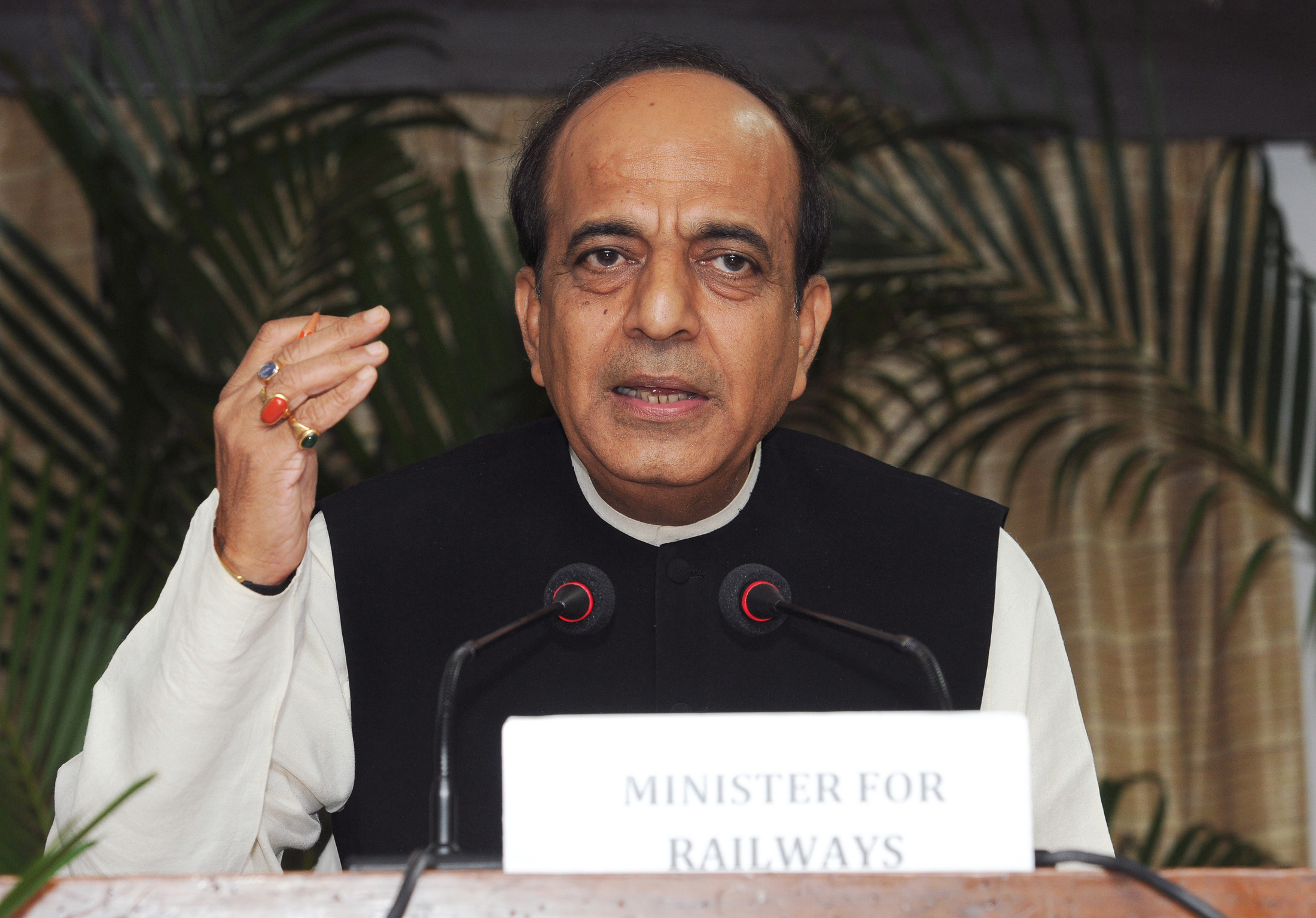
- Trivedi in 2011

High Commissioner of India to Bangladesh
- Incumbent
- Assumed office 25 June 2026
- Preceded by: Pranay Kumar Verma

Member of Parliament, Rajya Sabha
- In office 3 April 2020 – 12 February 2021
- Preceded by: Ahmed Hassan Imran
- Succeeded by: Jawhar Sircar
- Constituency: West Bengal
- In office 3 April 2002 – 2 April 2008
- Constituency: West Bengal
- In office 1990–1996
- Constituency: Gujarat

Minister of Railways
- In office 13 July 2011 – 18 March 2012
- Prime Minister: Manmohan Singh
- Preceded by: Mamata Banerjee
- Succeeded by: Mukul Roy

Minister of State for Health and Family Welfares
- In office 22 May 2009 – 13 July 2011
- Prime Minister: Manmohan Singh
- Minister: Ghulam Nabi Azad
- Preceded by: Panabaka Lakshmi (independent charge)
- Succeeded by: Sudip Bandyopadhyay

Member of Parliament, Lok Sabha
- In office 16 May 2009 – 23 May 2019
- Preceded by: Tarit Baran Topdar
- Succeeded by: Arjun Singh
- Constituency: Barrackpore

Personal details
- Born: 4 June 1950 (age 76) New Delhi, India
- Party: Bharatiya Janata Party (2021–present)
- Other political affiliations: Indian National Congress (1980–1990); Janata Dal (1990–1998); Trinamool Congress (1998–2021)
- Spouse: Minal Trivedi
- Education: St. Xavier's College, Kolkata (BCom); University of Texas at Austin (MBA)
- Profession: Pilot

Dinesh Hiralal Trivedi (born 4 June 1950) is an Indian politician. He was a Member of Parliament in Rajya Sabha from West Bengal and a former Member of Parliament, Lok Sabha (2009–19) representing Barrackpore constituency of West Bengal. Prior to that he was Member of Parliament, Rajya Sabha for two separate terms (1990–96, 2002–08). He is the former Union Minister for Railways and the former Union Minister of State for Health and Family Welfare under Manmohan Singh's cabinet.

Trivedi was recipient of Outstanding Parliamentarian Award for 2016–17 period and was felicitated at an event at the central hall of Parliament. He is also the Chairman of the Indo-European Union Parliamentary Forum (IEUPF), and other Parliamentary Forums.

On 12 February 2021, Trivedi resigned from Trinamool Congress and also decided to quit his Rajya Sabha seat. He joined the Bharatiya Janata Party on 6 March 2021.

In April 2026, he was appointed India's High Commissioner to Bangladesh, breaking a decades-long tradition of appointing career diplomats in this role, due to his deep roots in West Bengal and familiarity with cross-border issues, which are viewed as key assets for stabilizing relations during a delicate political period in Dhaka.

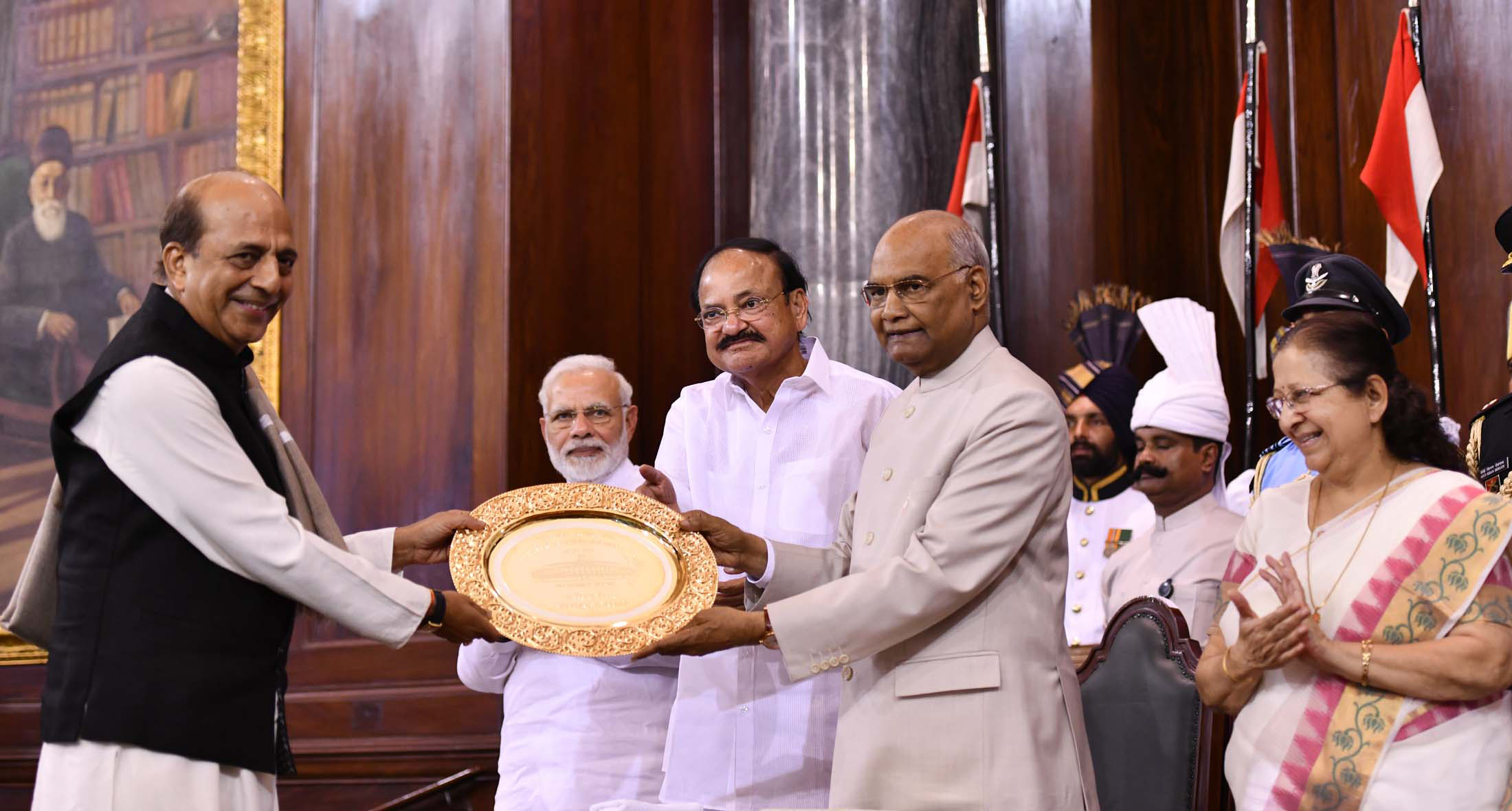
Ram Nath Kovind, the President of India, presenting the Outstanding Parliamentarian Award for the year 2016 to Dinesh Trivedi, at a function, at Parliament House, New Delhi

== Early life ==
Trivedi was born in a Gujarati family. He is the youngest child of his parents, Hiralal Trivedi and Urmilaben Trivedi, who migrated to India from Karachi during India's partition, where all his other siblings were born. His parents lived in a number of places before coming to New Delhi, where he was born. His father then started working for the Hindustan Construction Company in Kolkata. Trivedi attended boarding schools in Himachal Pradesh, before graduating in commerce from St. Xavier's College, Calcutta. He then took a loan of Rs. 20,000 and completed his MBA from The University of Texas at Austin. He also trained to be a pilot, a result of his childhood dream of flying for the Indian Air Force. He is a trained sitar player and enjoys classical music. He also applied to train as an actor at the Film Institute, Pune, but did not follow it up as he then believed it not to be a serious job, as reported by Rediff.com. He was also drawn towards a picture of Swami Vivekananda in an advertisement by the Ramkrishna Mission, and decided to be a monk, but did not do so due to strong advice by his family and a Swami in Chicago. He dons rings with sapphire, emerald and coral on his right hand to ward off the ill-effects of the mangal griha (planet Mars).

== Early career ==
After his MBA in 1974, he worked in Chicago for two years for the Detex Company, before returning to India, where he worked for a logistics provider Lee and Muirhead. In 1984, he quit the job to start his own air freight company based in Kolkata. He also started a consumer protection centre.

== Petitioner ==
Trivedi has filed many petitions. He says, "I was so fed up of corruption then. I thought I can't progress here. But, my father told me to learn to fight corruption, make your way." Trivedi shot into prominence when he asked the Supreme Court to make the Vohra Report on the criminalisation of politics in India public. This petition gave a push to the Right to Information movement.

== Career as a politician ==
Trivedi joined the Congress party in the 1980s, but switched over to the Janata Dal in 1990. Later, in 1998 he joined Mamata Banerjee when she started the Trinamool Congress party and became its first general secretary.

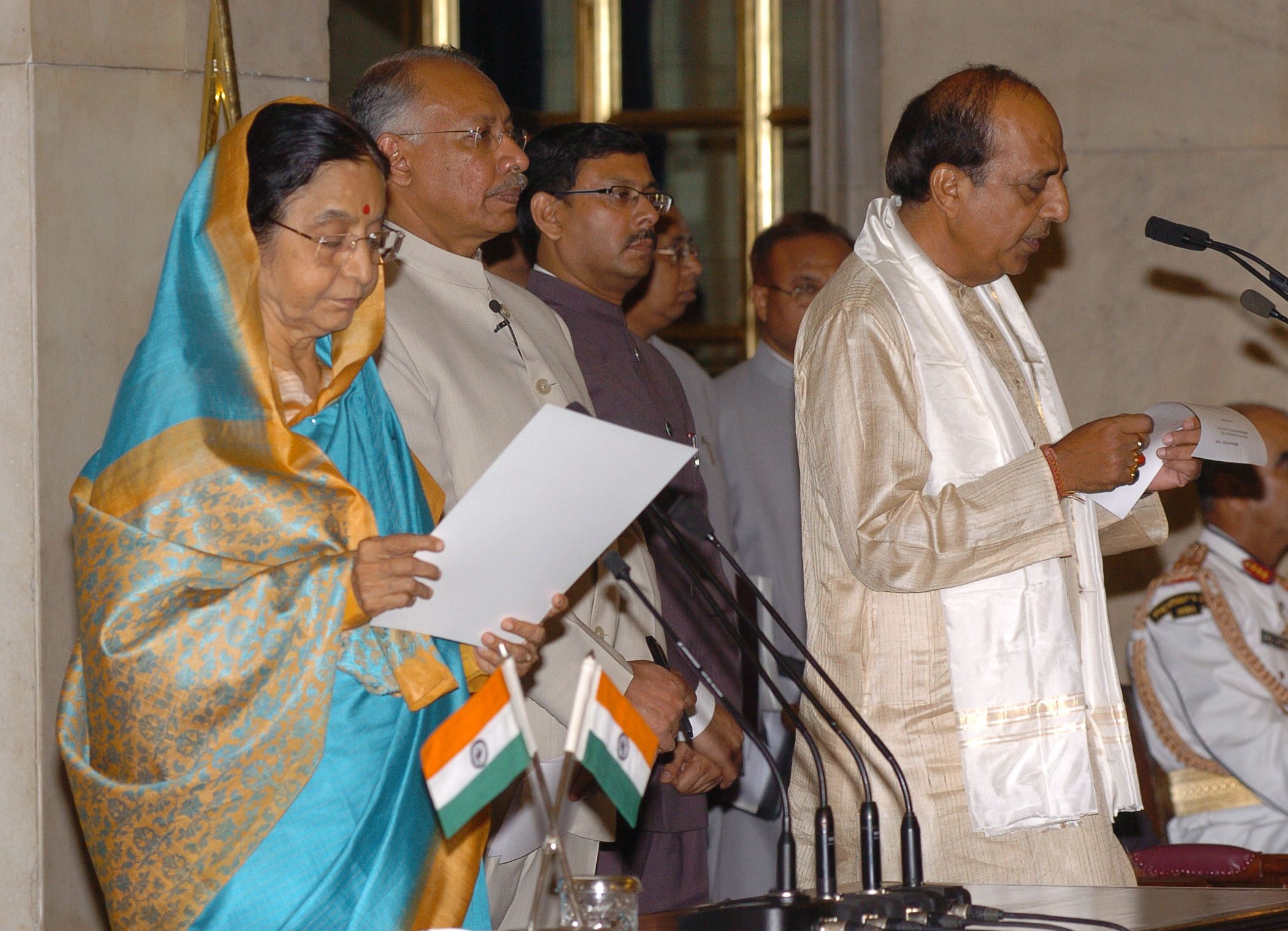
Trivedi sworn in as Minister of State, 2009.

He was a member of the Upper House in the Indian Parliament during years 1990–96 from Gujarat as Janata Dal candidate and during years 2002–08 from West Bengal as AITC candidate. In the 2009 elections he contested for the Trinamool Congress party and won from Barrackpore to join the lower house in the Parliament. He joined the cabinet as the Minister of State for Health and Family Welfare in 2009. In 2011, he offered to resign as a minister in support of Anna Hazare. In 2011, after Mamata Banerjee quit as the railway minister to become the Chief Minister of West Bengal, he was elevated as the Cabinet Minister for Railways. In 2019 Lok Sabha Election he contested from Barrackpore Loksabha and lost to Arjun Singh (Former MLA of Vatpara assembly). After his defeat he was elected to Rajya Sabha MP and after few days he quit his relationship with TMC and joined BJP.

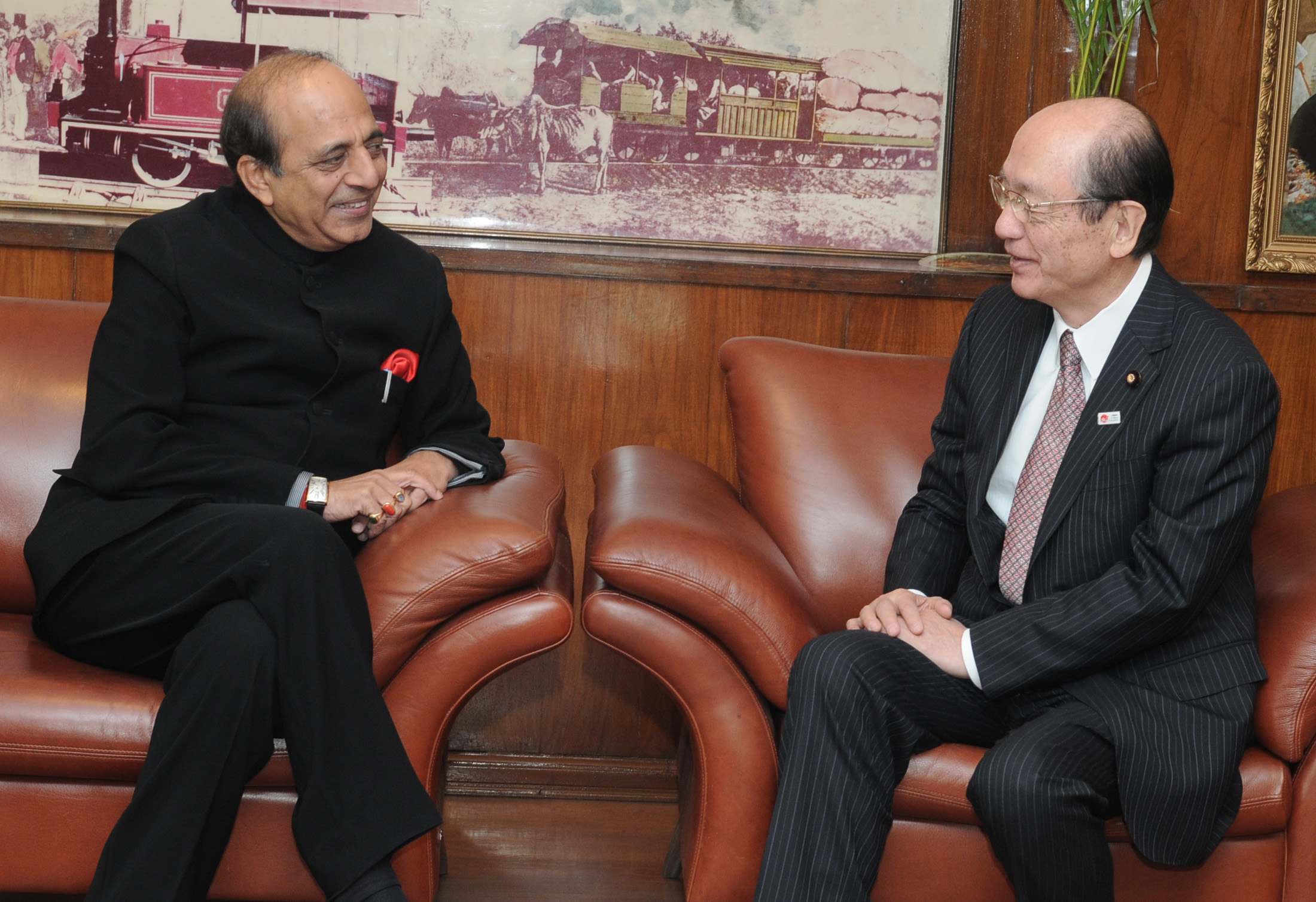
Trivedi with Takeshi Maeda, Minister of Land, Infrastructure, Transport and Tourism (MLIT), Government of Japan to discuss bilateral issues in the field of rail transportation and various aspects of high speed train corridors in India, in New Delhi on 12 January 2012.

=== Railway minister ===
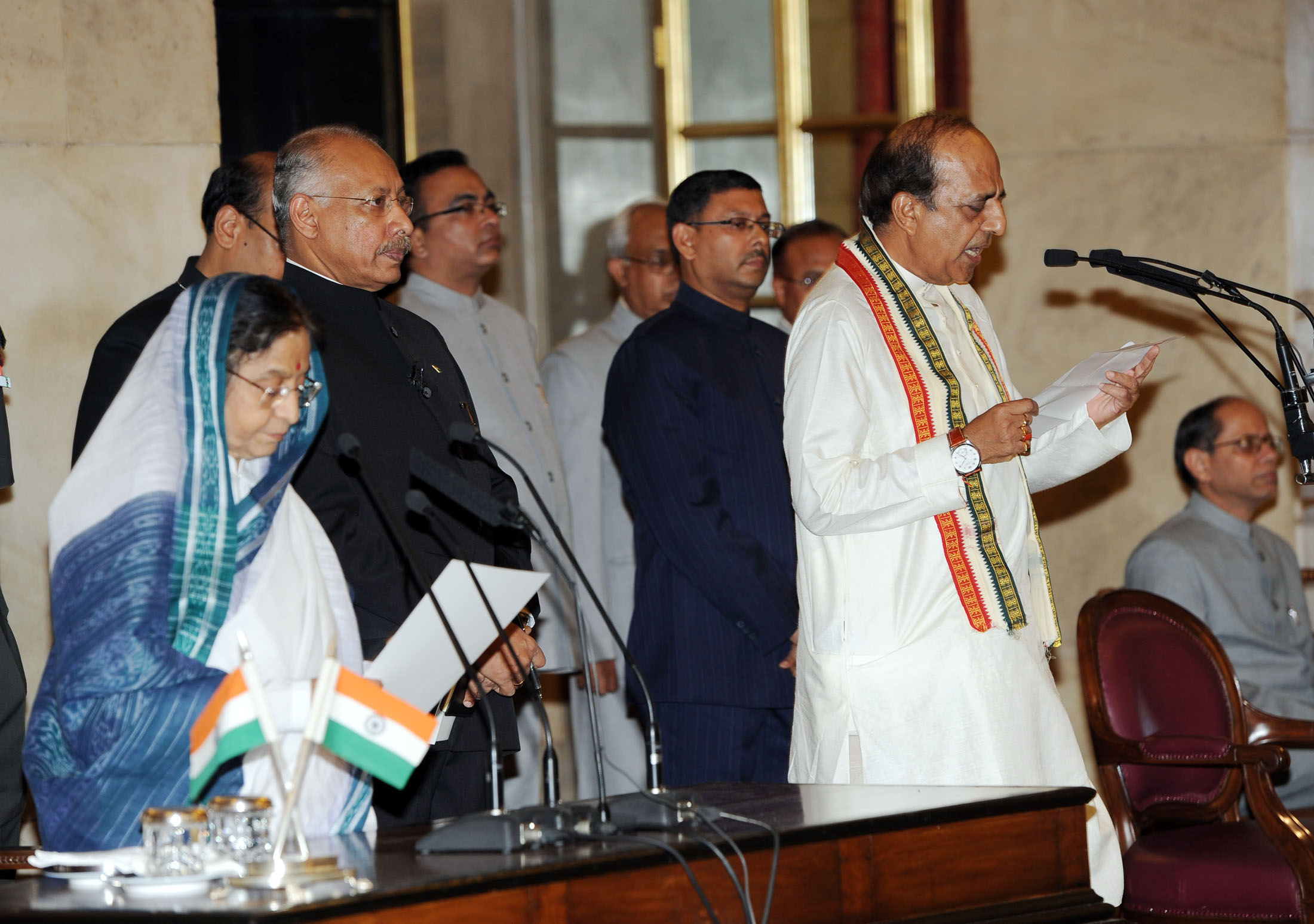
Trivedi sworn in as Cabinet Minister in 2011.

As the Railway minister, he has advocated instituting a rail regulator to fix rail fares, a policy that is diametrically opposite to the one by earlier railway ministers. He has also advocated de-politicizing the Railways and would like to restructure the Indian Railway Board, which lacked synergy before he joined. Trivedi believes that the Indian Railways can add 2% to India's GDP and is willing to go against his party's line of not hiking the fares. However, he believes the government must modernise the railways, for which a fare hike would not be able to generate adequate funds, and has publicly criticised the Prime Minister for not providing funds.. Trivedi is pushing for a national policy on railways, that would continue irrespective of political changes in the government. He has also said that the ministry is also open to the idea of privatisation, which would allow more funds to be allocated to help the system cope with capacity. He stepped down as the Railway Minister on 18 March 2012, a couple of days after presenting his first ever Railway Budget in which he increased passenger fare. This did not go down well with his political party, Trinamool Congress and in particular its head West Bengal Chief Minister Mamata Banerjee.

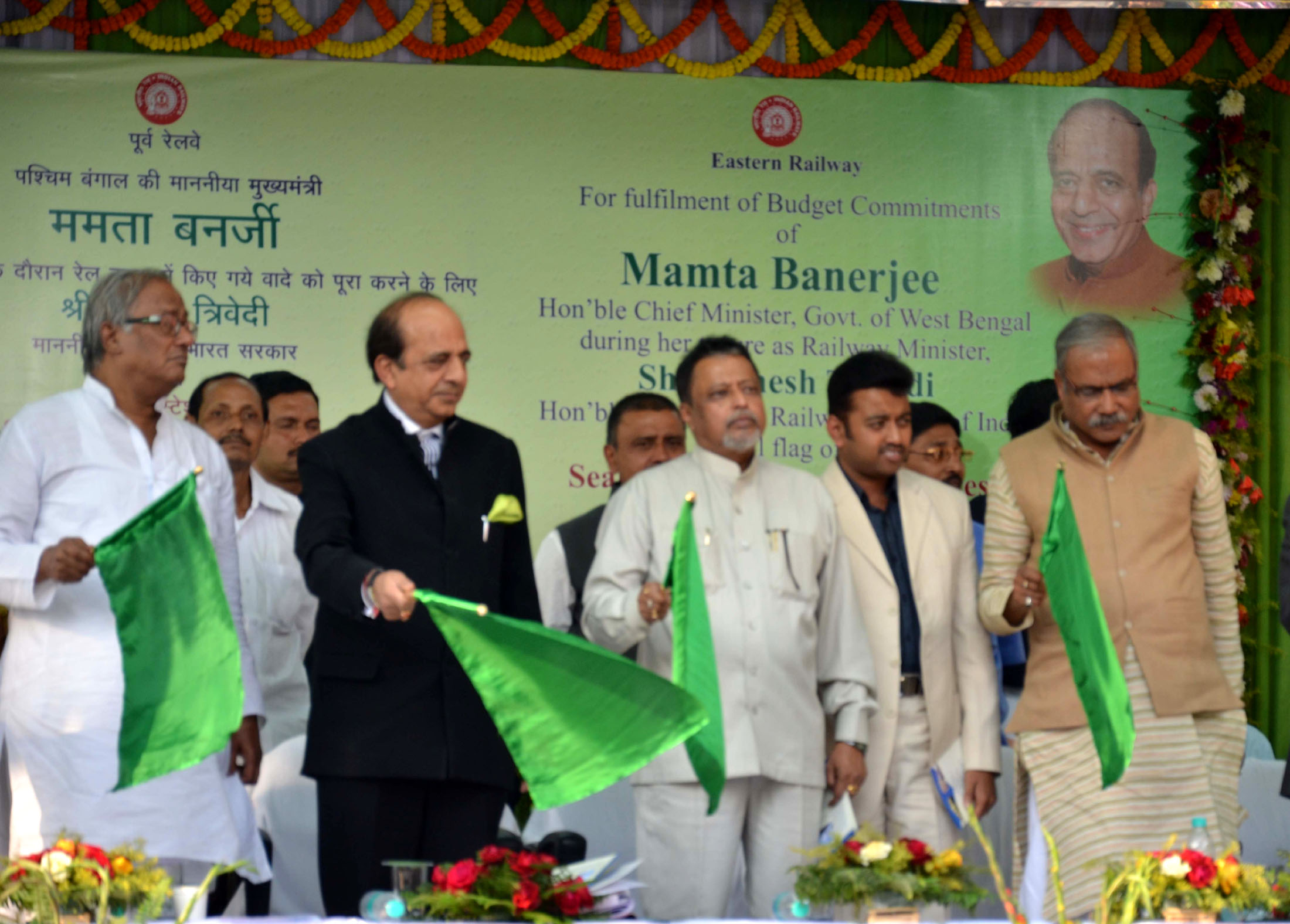
Trivedi flagging off the Sealdah-Puri Duranto Express and Sealdah-Barrackpur EMU Local train at Barrackpore railway station in West Bengal along with Mukul Roy, Saugata Roy and Shilbhadra Dutta.

Trivedi also expressed his interest to start high speed passenger trains in India with Japanese help or French support.

In 2011, the script of the James Bond film Skyfall, part of which was shot on trains in India, had to be changed when Trivedi insisted that people not be shown travelling on the roofs of trains, which is illegal.

In August 2011, Mamata Banerjee's ministerial room in the Parliament, which has traditionally been allotted to the railway minister, was allotted to another minister as she was his senior colleague in the cabinet. However, before the formal orders could be issued, Trivedi involved the Prime Minister and Mamata Banerjee to get the room allotted to himself to avoid "utter humiliation of the Railway Ministry and 14 lakh Railway employees". According to The Tribune, his party also reminded the Prime Minister that the UPA owed this to its biggest ally, the AITC.

==== Railway budget controversy ====
On 14 March 2012, Trivedi announced the annual rail budget 2012 that included an all over hike in passenger fares, ranging from 2 paise to 30 paise per kilometre for reasons of safety along with network expansion and modernisation. The fare hike was opposed by his own party's leader, Mamata Banerjee. Senior TMC MPs Sudip Bandyopadhyay and Derek O'Brien both expressed their disagreement. However, the budget received support from the general public, industry groups and all five Rail Unions. TMC chairperson and Chief Minister of West Bengal, Mamata Banerjee declared that she will not allow any hike in railway fares proposed in the Railway Budget. Banerjee denied being consulted by Railway Minister on the issue of fare hike. On the same day, Mamata Banerjee wrote to Prime Minister Manmohan Singh asking him to dismiss Dinesh Trivedi as Minister of Railways and give the portfolio to another AITC member of parliament Mukul Roy.

Initially, Trivedi requested a written confirmation from Mamata Banerjee before resigning, as he had received conflicting reports on the same from the Leader of the Trinamool Congress parliamentary party - Sudeep Bandyopadhyay and the chief whip of Trinamool Congress in Lok Sabha - Kalyan Banerjee. Finally, on 18 March 2012, Trivedi resigned after making a direct phone call to Mamata Banerjee for confirmation of the party position. Later, Trivedi explicitly clarified that he had resigned because Trinamool Congress and Mamata Banerjee asked him to resign, but that he had received "communication" that neither PM nor Congress would request for his resignation, with the result that "..if I had not resigned on that particular evening (last Sunday), I could have brought uncertainty to government itself and that is not my job". On forwarding the resignation to the President with recommendation of acceptance, Prime Minister Manmohan Singh praised the budget presented by Trivedi and expressed "regret" on his "departure".

== Electoral History ==
=== Lok Sabha ===
| Year | Const. | Party | Votes | % | Opponent | Party | Votes | % | Result | Margin | % |
|---|---|---|---|---|---|---|---|---|---|---|---|
| 2019 | Barrackpore | AITC | 4,58,137 | 41.47 | Arjun Singh | BJP | 4,72,994 | 42.82 | Lost | -14,857 | -1.35 |
| 2014 | Barrackpore | AITC | 4,79,206 | 45.53 | Subhashini Ali | CPI(M) | 2,72,433 | 25.88 | Won | +2,06,773 | +19.65 |
| 2009 | Barrackpore | AITC | 4,28,699 | 49.28 | Tarit Baran Topdar | CPI(M) | 3,72,675 | 42.84 | Won | +56,024 | +6.44 |

=== Rajya Sabha ===
| Position | Party | Constituency | From | To | Tenure |
|---|---|---|---|---|---|
| Member of Parliament, Rajya Sabha (1st Term) | JD | Gujarat | 10 April 1990 | 9 April 1996 | 5 years, 365 days |
| Member of Parliament, Rajya Sabha (2nd Term) | AITC | West Bengal | 3 April 2002 | 2 April 2008 | 5 years, 365 days |
| Member of Parliament, Rajya Sabha (3rd Term) | AITC | West Bengal | 3 April 2020 | 12 February 2021 | 315 days |

== High Commissioner to Bangladesh ==
on 27 April 2026, he was appointed as the high commissioner of India to Bangladesh, in Dhaka succeeding Ambassador Pranay Kumar Verma. His appointment to Dhaka came at a time when both India and Bangladesh are looking at repairing the bilateral ties that came under strain during the tenure of interim government of Muhammad Yunus.

== Personal life ==
Trivedi is married to Minal, who holds a PhD in genetics. They have a son.

== Positions held ==
| Position Held | Detail/Organization |
|---|---|
| Lok Sabha Election 1996 Candidate | For Janata Dal, from Kachchha, Gujrat |
| Member of Rajya Sabha (1990–1996; 2002–2008; 2020–2021) | Janata Dal, from Gujarat; Trinamool Congress, West Bengal; Trinamool Congress, West Bengal |
| Member of Lok Sabha (2009–2019) | Trinamool Congress, Barrackpore (Lok Sabha constituency) |
| Chairman | Passengers Amenities Committee, Ministry of Railways |
| Member | Committee on Rules |
| Member | Consultative Committee for the Ministry of Civil Aviation |
| Member | Civil Aviation Committee |
| Member | Committee on Finance |
| Member | Committee on Commerce |
| Vice-Chairman | Rajya Sabha |
| Member | Committee on Petitions |
| Member | Committee on Public Undertakings Member, General Purposes Committee |
| Co-Convener | Sub-Committee for Special Economic Zones of the Committee on Commerce |

== Forums ==
| Position | Forum |
|---|---|
| Chairman | Indo EU Parliamentarians forum |
| Member | Indo American Forum of Parliamentarians |
| Member | Indo British Forum of Parliamentarians |
| Member | Indo France Forum of Parliamentarians |
| Member | Indo German Forum of Parliamentarians |
| Member | Indo UK Forum of Parliamentarians |
| Member | Indo Japan Forum of Parliamentarians |
| Member | Aspan Dialogue Think Tank, USA |
| Member | Aspan Euro |
