= Madhusudan Ghose =

Indian politician

Member of the West Bengal Legislative Assembly
- In office 2016–2017
- Preceded by: Manju Basu
- Succeeded by: Sunil Singh
- Constituency: Noapara

Personal details
- Born: 1938
- Died: 18 August 2017 (aged 78–79)
- Party: Indian National Congress
- Education: Calcutta University
- Profession: Politician

Madhusudan Ghose (1938 - 18 August 2017) was an Indian politician from West Bengal. He was elected as a Member of the Legislative Assembly in 2016 West Bengal Legislative Assembly election from Bharatpur, as a member of the Indian National Congress.
