= Naihati Assembly constituency =

Naihati
- Constituency No. 104 for the West Bengal Legislative Assembly
- Interactive Map Outlining Naihati Assembly Constituency

Constituency details
- Country: India
- Region: East India
- State: West Bengal
- District: North 24 Parganas
- Lok Sabha constituency: Barrackpore
- Established: 1951
- Total electors: 152,602
- Reservation: None

Member of Legislative Assembly
- 18th West Bengal Legislative Assembly
- Incumbent Sumitro Chatterjee
- Party: BJP
- Elected year: 2026

Naihati Assembly constituency is an assembly constituency in North 24 Parganas district in the Indian state of West Bengal.

== Overview ==
As per orders of the Delimitation Commission, No. 104 Naihati Assembly constituency is composed of the following: Naihati municipality, and Jethia, Kampa-Chakla, Majhipara–Palasi and Shibdaspur gram panchayats of Barrackpore I community development block.

Naihati Assembly constituency is part of No. 15 Barrackpore (Lok Sabha constituency).

== Members of the Legislative Assembly ==
Year	Name	Party
1951	Suresh Chandra Pal	Indian National Congress
1957	Gopal Basu	Communist Party of India
1962	Gopal Basu	Communist Party of India
1967	G. Bhattacharya	Indian National Congress
1969	Gopal Basu	Communist Party of India (Marxist)
1971	Gopal Basu	Communist Party of India (Marxist)
1972	Tarapada Mukhopadhyay	Indian National Congress
1977	Gopal Basu	Communist Party of India (Marxist)
1982	Ajit Basu	Communist Party of India (Marxist)
1987	Tarun Adhikary	Indian National Congress
1991	Tarun Adhikary	Indian National Congress
1996	Ranjit Kundu	Communist Party of India (Marxist)
2001	Ranjit Kundu	Communist Party of India (Marxist)
2006	Ranjit Kundu	Communist Party of India (Marxist)
2011	Partha Bhowmick	All India Trinamool Congress
2016	Partha Bhowmick	All India Trinamool Congress
2021	Partha Bhowmick	All India Trinamool Congress
2024^	Sanat Dey	All India Trinamool Congress
2026	Sumitro Chatterjee	Bharatiya Janata Party

- ^ by-election

== Election results ==
=== 2026 ===
2026 West Bengal Legislative Assembly election: Naihati
Party	Candidate	Votes	%	±%
BJP	Sumitro Chatterjee	77,484	49.15	▲11.51
AITC	Sanat Dey	67,054	42.53	▼7.16
CPI(ML)L	Debajyoti Majumder	7,727	4.9	
INC	Pradip Kumar kundu	1,505	0.95	
NOTA	None of the above	1,187	0.75	▼0.34
Majority		10,430	6.62	▼5.43
Turnout		157,664	92.1	▲11.42
BJP gain from AITC		Swing		

=== 2024 bypoll ===
2024 West Bengal Legislative Assembly by-election: Naihati
Party	Candidate	Votes	%	±%
AITC	Sanat Dey	78,772	62.97	▲12.00
BJP	Rupak Mitra	29,495	23.58	▼14.42
CPI(ML)L	Debajyoti Mazumdar	7,593	6.07	▼3.93
INC	Paresh Nath Sarkar	3,883	3.1	new
NOTA	None of the above	1,728	1.38	
Majority		49,277		
Turnout		124,587		
AITC hold		Swing		

=== 2021 ===
2021 West Bengal Legislative Assembly election: Naihati
Party	Candidate	Votes	%	±%
AITC	Partha Bhowmick	77,753	49.69	
BJP	Falguni Patra	58,898	37.64	
CPI(M)	Indrani Kundu Mukherjee	15,825	10.11	
NOTA	None of the above	1,701	1.09	
Majority		18,855	12.05	
Turnout		156,468	80.68	
AITC hold		Swing		

=== 2011 ===
In the 2011 election, Partha Bhowmick of Trinamool Congress defeated his nearest rival Ranjit Kundu of CPI(M).

West Bengal assembly elections, 2011: Naihati constituency
Party	Candidate	Votes	%	±%
AITC	Partha Bhowmick	75,842	57.39	+10.91#
CPI(M)	Ranjit Kundu	48,012	36.50	−12.50
BJP	Biswajit Sur	2,821	2.14	
Independent	Saumen Sarkar	1,933		
CPI(ML)L	Subrata Sengupta	1,547		
BSP	Biswajit Sarkar	946		
Independent	Ranjit Paul	78		
Turnout		131,522	86.19	
AITC gain from CPI(M)		Swing	23.21#	

.# Swing calculated on Congress+Trinamool Congress vote percentages taken together in 2006.

=== 2006 ===
In the 2006, 2001 and 1996 state assembly elections, Ranjit Kundu of CPI (M) won the Naihati assembly seat defeating Dhillon Sarkar of Trinamool Congress in 2006, Tarun Adhikary of Trinamool Congress in 2001 and of Congress in 1996. Contests in most years were multi cornered but only winners and runners are being mentioned. Tarun Adhikary of Congress won the seat defeating Shyamal Bhattacharjee of JD in 1991 and Gopal Basu of CPI (M) in 1987. Ajit Basu of CPI (M) won the seat in 1982 defeating Ranjit Bhattacharya of Congress. Gopal Basu of CPI (M) won in 1977 defeating Jagadish Chakrabarty of Congress.

=== 1972 ===
Tarapada Mukhopadhyay of Congress won in 1972. Gopal Basu of CPI(M) won in 1971 and 1969. G.Bhattacharya of Congress won in 1967. Gopal Basu of CPI won in 1962 and 1957. In independent India's first election in 1951 Suresh Chandra Pal of Congress won from Naihati.
