= Subhranshu Roy =

Indian politician

Member of Legislative Assembly, West Bengal
- In office 2011–2021
- Preceded by: Nirjharini Chakraborty
- Succeeded by: Subodh Adhikary
- Constituency: Bijpur

Personal details
- Party: Trinamool Congress (2021–present)
- Other political affiliations: Bharatiya Janata party (2019–2021)
- Parent(s): Mukul Roy (Father); Krishna Roy (Mother)
- Occupation: Politician

Subhranshu Roy is an Indian politician of All India Trinamool Congress from the state of West Bengal. He is a two term member of the West Bengal Legislative Assembly. On 29 May 2017, he joined Bharatiya Janata Party and later Trinamool Congress suspended him for six years. He is the former MLA from Bijpur (Vidhan Sabha constituency).

== Political career ==
He is a former leader of the Trinamool Congress. On 28 May 2019, he joined the Bharatiya Janata Party in the presence of senior BJP leaders Mukul Roy and Kailash Vijayvargiya.

On 11 June 2021, he along with his father Mukul Roy rejoined TMC in the presence of Mamata Banerjee and others.
