= Bimal Comar Ghosh =

Indian politician

Member of Parliament, Lok Sabha
- In office 1957–1962
- Preceded by: Ramananda Das
- Succeeded by: Renu Chakravartty
- Constituency: Barrackpore, West Bengal

Member of Parliament, Rajya Sabha
- In office 1952–1957
- Constituency: West Bengal

Personal details
- Born: 11 November 1906 Mymensingh, Bengal Presidency, British India
- Died: 4 August 1961 (age 54)
- Party: Praja Socialist Party

Bimal Comar Ghosh (1906–1961) was an Indian politician. He was elected to the Lok Sabha, the lower house of the Parliament of India, from Barrackpore, West Bengal as a member of the Praja Socialist Party.
