= Sunil Singh (politician) =

Indian politician

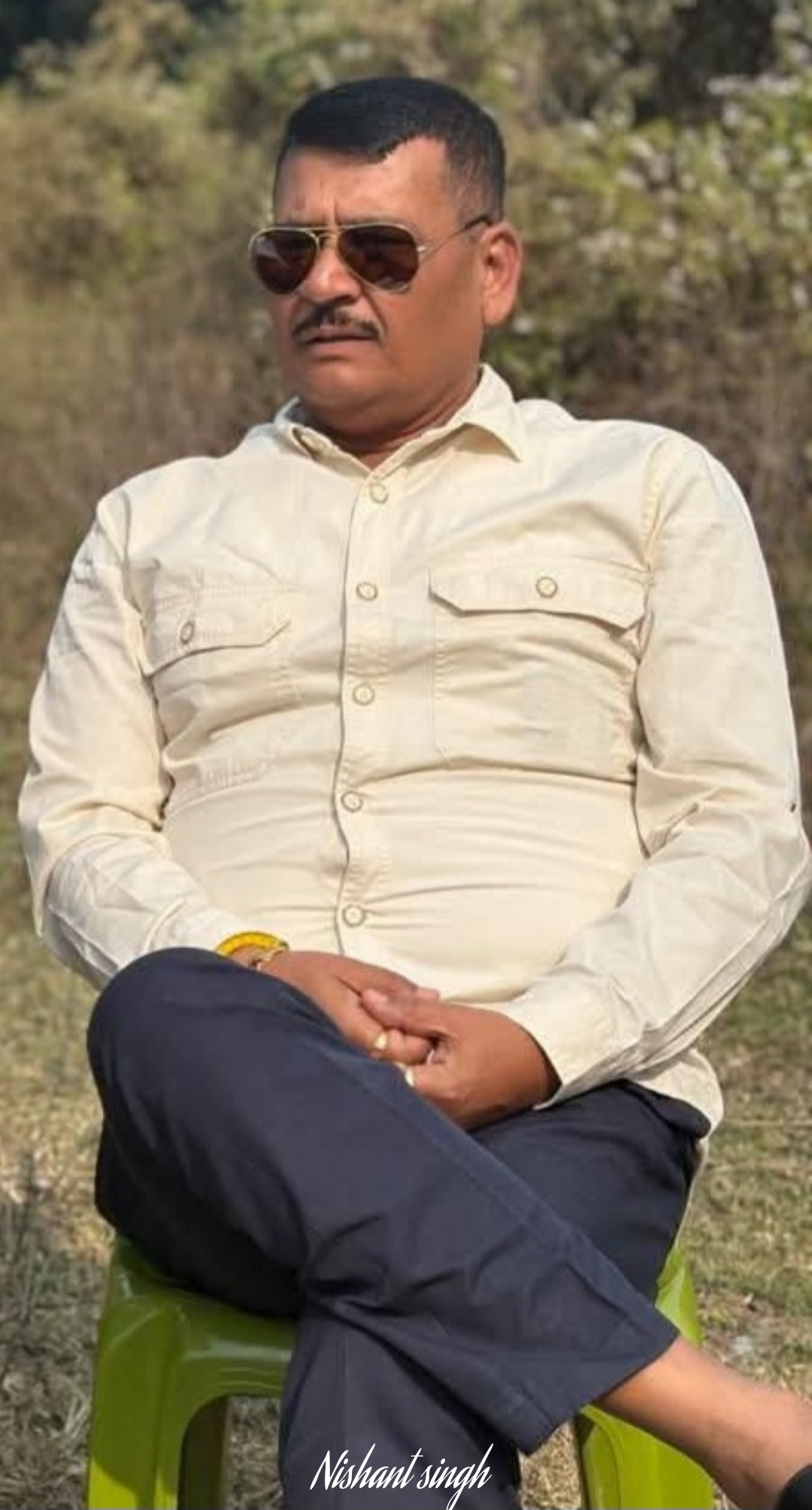

Member of the West Bengal Legislative Assembly
- In office 1 February 2018 – 2021
- Preceded by: Madhusudan Ghose
- Succeeded by: Manju Basu
- Constituency: Noapara

Chairman, Garulia Municipality
- In office 2010 – 2019 (by resignation)
- Succeeded by: Sanjay Singh
- In office 2003–2004

Personal details
- Born: 1967 or 1968 (age 58–59)
- Party: Trinamool Congress (2022–2026), (2000–2019)
- Other political affiliations: Bharatiya Janata Party (2019–2022)(2026- Present)
- Occupation: Politician
- Profession: Business

Sunil Singh is an Indian politician and a member of the West Bengal Legislative Assembly from Noapara in West Bengal, a seat which he won in February 2018 as an Trinamool Congress candidate. He was also the chairman of Garulia municipality till September 2019. He joined the Bharatiya Janata Party in June 2019. Singh left BJP by withdrawing from the municipal councillor candidature on 12 February 2022, after which he rejoined TMC on 13 February 2022.

== Political career ==
He represents the Noapara Vidhan Sabha constituency which he won in 2018 as an All India Trinamool Congress (AITC) candidate. He was a member of AITC from 2009 to 2019. Before that he was in the Indian National Congress from 1995 to 2009. Singh joined Bharatiya Janata Party on 17 June 2019.

On 30 September 2019, Singh resigned from the post of the chairman of Garulia municipality.

On 13 February 2022, Singh rejoined AITC after withdrawing his candidature of BJP in the 2022 West Bengal Municipal Election.

=== Notable works ===
Singh started a new bus route from Shyamnagar to Howrah via Sealdah. On his father's death anniversary, he held social programs by giving scholarships to poor children, distributed blankets and organised blood donation camp in Garulia under Noapara.

On 27 January 2019 Singh hosted a mass marriage ceremony for the poor including 15 couples of different backgrounds.
