= Manju Basu =

Indian politician

Member of West Bengal Legislative Assembly
- In office 6 May 2021 – 4 May 2026
- Preceded by: Sunil Singh
- Succeeded by: Arjun Singh
- Constituency: Noapara
- In office 2011–2016
- Preceded by: Kushadhwaj Ghosh
- Succeeded by: Madhusudan Ghose
- Constituency: Noapara
- In office 2001–2006
- Preceded by: Madan Mohan Nath
- Succeeded by: Kushadhwaj Ghosh
- Constituency: Noapara

Personal details
- Born: December 15, 1952 (age 73)
- Party: Trinamool Congress
- Spouse: Bikash Basu
- Education: M.A. (Humanities and Education)

Manju Basu is a Trinamool Congress politician and was a Member of Legislative Assembly from Noapara.

A graduate in humanities and education, she was a school teacher by profession. She entered active politics in 2000 after her husband, Bikash Basu, also a school teacher and a Trinamool Congress activist, was killed in the run up to the election the following year.

She was nominated a Trinamool Congress candidate from Noapara in 2001 and she won the election. However, she lost in 2006 but won again in 2011. In the 2016 General Election she lost the seat again. The Congress candidate Madhusudan Ghosh won the seat. Again, in 2021 West Bengal Legislative Assembly Election she defeated her nearest rival Sunil Singh of BJP.
