= Debi Ghosal =

Indian politician (1934–2022)

Debi Ghosal MP

Member of Parliament, Lok Sabha
- In office 1984–1989
- Preceded by: M Ismail
- Succeeded by: Tarit Baran Topdar
- Constituency: Barrackpore, West Bengal

Personal details
- Born: 1 November 1934 Ariadaha, 24 Parganas, Bengal Presidency, British India
- Died: 5 August 2022 (aged 87)
- Party: Indian National Congress
- Spouse: Jolly Ghosal

Debi Ghosal (1 November 1934 – 5 August 2022) was an Indian politician. He was elected to the Lok Sabha, lower house of the Parliament of India, from Barrackpore, West Bengal as a member of the Indian National Congress, serving from 1984 to 1989. He died on 5 August 2022, at the age of 87.
