= Krishnanagar Uttar Assembly constituency =

Krishnanagar Uttar
- Constituency No. 83 for the West Bengal Legislative Assembly
- Interactive Map Outlining Krishnanagar Uttar Assembly Constituency

Constituency details
- Country: India
- Region: East India
- State: West Bengal
- District: Nadia
- Lok Sabha constituency: Krishnanagar
- Established: 2011
- Total electors: 228,030
- Reservation: None

Member of Legislative Assembly
- 18th West Bengal Legislative Assembly
- Incumbent Tarak Nath Chatterjee
- Party: BJP
- Alliance: NDA
- Elected year: 2026

Krishnanagar Uttar Assembly constituency is an assembly constituency in Nadia district in the Indian state of West Bengal.

== Overview ==
As per orders of the Delimitation Commission, No. 83 Krishnanagar Uttar Assembly constituency is composed of the following: Krishnanagar municipality, and Bhandar Khola, Bhimpur, Asannagar, Dogachhi and Pora Gachha gram panchayats of Krishnanagar I community development block.

Krishnanagar Uttar Assembly constituency is part of No. 12 Krishnanagar Lok Sabha constituency.

== Members of the Legislative Assembly ==
Year	Name of M.L.A.	Party
2011	Abani Mohan Joardar	Trinamool Congress
2016	Abani Mohan Joardar	Trinamool Congress
2021	Mukul Roy (Note: Elected as BJP MLA; later switched to AITC in June 2021)	Bharatiya Janata Party
2026	Tarak Nath Chatterjee	Bharatiya Janata Party

== Election results ==
=== 2026 ===
2026 West Bengal Legislative Assembly election: Krishnanagar Uttar
Party	Candidate	Votes	%	±%
BJP	Tarak Nath Chatterjee	133,211	65.93	▲11.74
AITC	Somnath Dutta	54,850	27.15	▼9.65
CPI(M)	Adwaita Biswas	8,336	4.13	
NOTA	None of the above	1,192	0.59	▼0.33
Majority		78,361	38.78	▲21.39
Turnout		202,057	92.99	▲8.28
BJP hold		Swing	21.39	

=== 2021 ===
2021 West Bengal Legislative Assembly election: Krishnanagar Uttar
Party	Candidate	Votes	%	±%
BJP	Mukul Roy	109,357	54.19	
AITC	Koushani Mukherjee	74,268	36.80	
INC	Silvi Saha	11,407	5.65	
NOTA	None of the above	1,851	0.92	
Majority		35,089	17.39	
Turnout		201,805	84.71	
BJP gain from AITC		Swing		

=== 2016 ===
2016 West Bengal Legislative Assembly election: Krishnanagar Uttar
Party	Candidate	Votes	%	±%
AITC	Abani Mohan Joardar	82,864	44.14	
INC	Ashim Kumar Saha	69,949	37.26	
BJP	Chanchal Kumar Biswas	26,796	14.27	
NOTA	None of the above	3,175	1.69	
Turnout		1,87,738	85.58	
AITC hold		Swing		

=== 2011 ===
2011 West Bengal Legislative Assembly election: Krishnanagar Uttar
Party	Candidate	Votes	%	±%
AITC	Abani Mohan Joardar	96,677	56.69	+10.90
CPI(M)	Subinay Ghosh	61,567	36.10	−12.70
BJP	Ramen Biswas	5,967	3.50	
Independent	Jagannath Guha	2,980		
CPI(ML)L	Amal Tarafdar	1,830		
BSP	Birendra Nath Mondal	1,508		
Turnout		170,529	85.09	
AITC win (new seat)				
