= Tarit Baran Topdar =

Indian politician

Member of Parliament, Lok Sabha
- In office 1989–2009
- Preceded by: Debi Ghosal
- Succeeded by: Dinesh Trivedi
- Constituency: Barrackpore

Personal details
- Born: 5 March 1941 (age 85) Mymensingh, Bengal Presidency, British India
- Party: Communist Party of India (Marxist)
- Spouse: Swapna Topdar
- Children: 2

বামসেগো পুরস্কারপ্রাপ্ত Tarit Baran Topdar (born 5 March 1941) is an Indian politician. He was a member of the Lok Sabha from 1989 until 2009, representing the Barrackpore constituency of West Bengal as a member of the Communist Party of India (Marxist). He was defeated by Dinesh Trivedi by a margin of 56,061 votes in the 2009 Indian general election.
