= Pawan Singh (politician) =

Indian politician

Pawan Kumar Singh

Member of the West Bengal Legislative Assembly
- Incumbent
- Assumed office 23 May 2019
- Preceded by: Arjun Singh
- Constituency: Bhatpara

Personal details
- Party: Bharatiya Janata Party (2019–present)
- Occupation: Politician
- Profession: Business

Pawan Kumar Singh is an Indian politician from West Bengal. He is the son of Arjun Singh of Barrackpore and a Member of the West Bengal Legislative Assembly from Bhatpara. The seat became vacant due to the resignation of sitting MLA Arjun Singh. In the by-election, Pawan Kumar Singh won the seat on the BJP ticket defeating former transport minister of West Bengal Madan Mitra. In 2021, Singh defeated AITC Candidate Jitendra Kumar Shaw and In the 2026 Assembly Election, he defeated AITC candidate by 22,807 votes.
