= Abani Mohan Joardar =

Indian politician (died 2020)

Member of the West Bengal Legislative Assembly
- In office 2016 – 12 June 2020
- Constituency: Krishnanagar Uttar (Vidhan Sabha constituency)

Member of the West Bengal Legislative Assembly
- In office 2011–2016

Personal details
- Died: 12 June 2020 (aged 79)
- Party: Trinamool Congress
- Occupation: Politician

Abani Mohan Joardar (died on 12 June 2020) was an Indian Politician from the state of West Bengal. Joardar was a two term member of the West Bengal Legislative Assembly and represented the Krishnanagar Uttar (Vidhan Sabha constituency). Joardar was from the Trinamool Congress.
