= Sudipta Das =

Indian politician

Member of the West Bengal Legislative Assembly
- Incumbent
- Assumed office 4 May 2026
- Preceded by: Subodh Adhikary
- Constituency: Bijpur

Personal details
- Party: Bharatiya Janata Party
- Profession: Politician

Sudipta Das is a politician from West Bengal. He is a member of West Bengal Legislative Assembly, from Bijpur Assembly constituency. He is a member of Bharatiya Janata Party.
