= Parash Dutta =

Indian politician

Parash Dutta (born 1948 (age 76–77)) is an Indian politician from West Bengal. He is a former member of the West Bengal Legislative Assembly from Jagatdal Assembly constituency in North 24 Parganas district. He won the 2016 West Bengal Legislative Assembly election representing the All India Trinamool Congress. He quit the Bharatiya Janata Party (BJP) and joined the Trinamool Congress in 2001 and was elected from Behala Purba Assembly constituency in South 24 Parganas district.

== Early life and education ==
Dutta is from Jagatdal, North 24 Parganas district, West Bengal. He is the son of late Santosh Kumar Dutta. He completed his BCom at a college affiliated with Calcutta University in 1971.

== Career ==
Dutta first became an MLA after he was elected from the Behala Purba (East) Assembly constituency representing the All India Trinamool Congress in the 2001 West Bengal Legislative Assembly election. He defeated Kumkum Chakraborti of the Communist Party of India (Marxist). He shifted to Jagadal seat in the North 24 Parganas district and was elected for the second time in the 2011 West Bengal Legislative Assembly election. In 2011, he polled 86,388 votes and defeated his nearest rival, Haripada Biswas of the All India Forward Bloc, by a margin of 36,032 votes. He was elected for a third term in the 2016 West Bengal Legislative Assembly election from Jagadal seat. In 2016, he polled votes and once again defeated his closest opponent, BIswas of AIFB, by a margin of 27,045 votes.

In September 2020, he decided not to contest the 2021 Assembly election, alleging anti party activities by his own Trinamool party members in his constituency.
