= Mahatma Gandhi University, West Bengal =

University in India

Mahatma Gandhi University
- Former name: Purba Medinipur University
- Type: Public
- Established: 2017; 9 years ago
- Affiliations: UGC
- Chancellor: Governor of West Bengal
- Vice-Chancellor: Dr. Sourangshu Mukhopadhyay
- Location: Mahishadal, Purba Medinipur district, West Bengal, India
- Campus: 20 acres (8.1 ha); Rural
- Website: www.mguwb.ac.in

Mahatma Gandhi University, West Bengal (MGU West Bengal) is a university in Mahishadal, Purba Medinipur district, West Bengal. The university was established in 2018 as Purba Medinipur University under The Purba Medinipur University Act, 2017. In 2018 it was renamed through The Purba Medinipur University (Amendment) Act, 2018. It became active with the appointment of the first vice-chancellor, Subrata Kumar De, in November 2020. It offers education in Bengali, English, History and Mathematics.

== History ==
=== Founding ===
In 2017, The university was established by the Government of West Bengal in through The Purba Medinipur University Act, 2017 passed by the West Bengal Legislative Assembly. As per The Purba Medinipur University Act, 2017, the university was established as "Purba Medinipur University". However, the act was amended and the new name of the university renamed to Mahatma Gandhi University by The Purba Medinipur University (amendment) Act, 2018. Chief Minister Mamata Banerjee laid the foundation stone of the university campus on 2 October 2018.

The cost of building the necessary infrastructure in the campus of the university was estimated at 105 crore rupees. The Department of Public Works (West Bengal) has identified the land in Bamunia, Mahishadal and started the process of constructing the university building. The contractor company involved in the construction work claimed that they completed work worth 20 crores, but were paid 8 crores. In this situation, the Department of Public Works (West Bengal) ordered to stop the work. The construction of the boundary wall of the twenty-acre campus started in 2019, but due to lack of funds, the work stopped by April 2022.

In 2020, the university started admissions of students and classes. But as the construction work of the academic building was not completed, the students were started in Mahishadal Raj College.

== Organisation and administration ==
=== Governance ===
The highest authority of Mahatma Gandhi University is the Court. All administrative functions are conducted through the Court. It consists of a total of 39 members including Chancellor, Vice-Chancellor, Secretary to the Finance Department of the Government of West Bengal and the Chairman of the West Bengal State Higher Education Council or his nominee. There are 9 ex-officio members, 24 as representatives of University departments and affiliated colleges, 5 as nominated members and 1 specially invited member. The members of the Court monitor the operation of the university, its affiliated colleges and the university's funding. Chandradipa Ghosh was appointed as the Vice-Chancellor of Mahatma Gandhi University on 16 March 2023. The university is financed by grants from the Government of West Bengal and the University Grants Commission.

List of All Vice-Chancellors
No.	Name
1.	Subrata Kumar De
2.	Chandradipa Ghosh
3.	Bivraj Bhusan Parida
4.	Dr. Sourangshu Mukhopadhyay

=== Faculties and departments ===
The university has 6 departments organized into four schools: School of Literature & Languages, School of Social Sciences, School of Physical Sciences, and School of Life Sciences. These schools are organized into 2 faculties. The School of Literature & Languages, and the School of Social Sciences are run by the Faculty of Arts, and on the other hand, the School of Physical Sciences and the School of Life Sciences are run by the Faculty of Science.

== See also ==
- List of universities in West Bengal
- Education in India
- Education in West Bengal
