= Jagatdal Assembly constituency =

Jagatdal
- Constituency No. 106 for the West Bengal Legislative Assembly
- Interactive Map Outlining Jagatdal Assembly Constituency

Constituency details
- Country: India
- Region: East India
- State: West Bengal
- District: North 24 Parganas
- Lok Sabha constituency: Barrackpore
- Established: 1977
- Total electors: 172,294
- Reservation: None

Member of Legislative Assembly
- 18th West Bengal Legislative Assembly
- Incumbent Rajesh Kumar (police officer)
- Party: Bharatiya Janata Party
- Elected year: 2026

Jagatdal Assembly constituency is an assembly constituency in North 24 Parganas district in the Indian state of West Bengal.

== Overview ==
As per orders of the Delimitation Commission, No. 106 Jagatdal Assembly constituency is composed of the following: Ward Nos. 18 to 35 of Bhatpara Municipality, and Kogachi I, Kogachi II, Mamudpur, Panpur Keutia gram panchayats of Barrackpore I community development block.

Jagatdal Assembly constituency is part of No. 15 Barrackpore (Lok Sabha constituency).

== Members of the Legislative Assembly ==
Election Year	Name of Representative	Party affiliation
Jagatdal
1977	Nihar Basu	AIFB
1982	Nihar Basu	AIFB
1987	Nihar Basu	AIFB
1991	Nihar Basu	AIFB
1996	Anay Gopal Sinha	INC
2001	Haripada Biswas	AIFB
2006	Haripada Biswas	AIFB
2011	Parash Dutta	AITC
2016	Parash Dutta	AITC
2021	Somenath Shyam Ichini	AITC
2026	Rajesh Kumar	BJP

== Election results ==
=== 2026 ===
2026 West Bengal Legislative Assembly election: Jagatdal
Party	Candidate	Votes	%	±%
BJP	Rajesh Kumar	94,351	51.5	+13.62
AITC	Somenath Shyam Ichini	73,442	40.09	−7.92
AIFB	Parvej Ahmad Khan	9,062	4.95	−4.29
NOTA	None of the above	972	0.53	−0.89
Majority		20,909	11.41	+1.28
Turnout		183,193	93.37	+15.85
BJP gain from AITC		Swing		

=== 2021 ===
West Bengal assembly elections, 2021: Jagatdal
Party	Candidate	Votes	%	±%
AITC	Somenath Shyam Ichini	87,030	48.01	
BJP	Arindam Bhattacharya	68,666	37.88	
AIFB	Nemai Saha	16,748	9.24	
NOTA	None of the above	2,568	1.42	
Majority		18,364	10.13	
Turnout		181,287	77.52	
AITC hold		Swing		

=== 2011 ===
In the 2011 election, Parash Dutta of Trinamool Congress defeated his nearest rival Haripada Biswas of Forward Bloc.

West Bengal assembly elections, 2011: Jagatdal constituency
Party	Candidate	Votes	%	±%
AITC	Parash Dutta	86,388	58.80	
AIFB	Haripada Biswas	50,356	34.28	
BJP	Dilip Mitra	4,276	2.91	
BSP	Bimal Krishna Ray	2,657		
Independent	Mukul Sarkar	1,342		
Independent	Debashis Das	1,007		
Independent	Pronab Kumar De	884		
Turnout		146,910	85.27	
AITC gain from AIFB		Swing		

Trinamool Congress did not contest this seat in 2006

=== 2006 ===
In the 2006 and 2001 state assembly elections, Hari Pada Biswas of Forward Bloc won the Jagatdal assembly seat, defeating his nearest rivals Rahul (Biswajit) Sinha of BJP in 2006 and Mukul Roy of AITC in 2001. Contests in most years were multi-cornered but only winners and runners are mentioned. Anay Gopal Sinha of Congress defeated Nihar Basu of Forward Bloc in 1996. Nihar Basu of Forward Bloc defeated Anay Gopal Sinha of Congress in 1991, Nani Gopal Sarkar of Congress in 1987, Mrigen Lahiry of Congress in 1982 and Sudhin Bhattacharjee of Congress in 1977. Prior to that, the constituency did not exist.
