= Sumitro Chatterjee =

Indian politician (born 1964)

Sumitro Chatterjee (born 1964) is an Indian politician from West Bengal. He is a member of the West Bengal Legislative Assembly from the Naihati Assembly constituency in North 24 Parganas district representing the Bharatiya Janata Party.

== Early life and education ==
Chatterjee is from Bally, Howrah district, West Bengal. He is the son of the late Subankim Chatterjee. He did his LLB at University of Calcutta. He is an advocate at the Calcutta High Court and also serves as a director of Macronova Apparels private limited. He declared assets worth Rs.2 crore in his affidavit to the Election Commission of India.

== Career ==
Chatterjee won the Naihati Assembly constituency representing the Bharatiya Janata Party in the 2026 West Bengal Legislative Assembly election. He polled 77,484 votes and defeated his nearest rival and sitting MLA, Sanat Dey of the All India Trinamool Congress, by a margin of 10,430 votes.
