= 1972 West Bengal Legislative Assembly election =

- 11 March 1972

All 280 seats in the West Bengal Legislative Assembly 141 seats needed for a majority
- Turnout: 60.82% (▲1.21 pp)
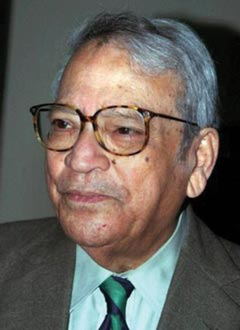

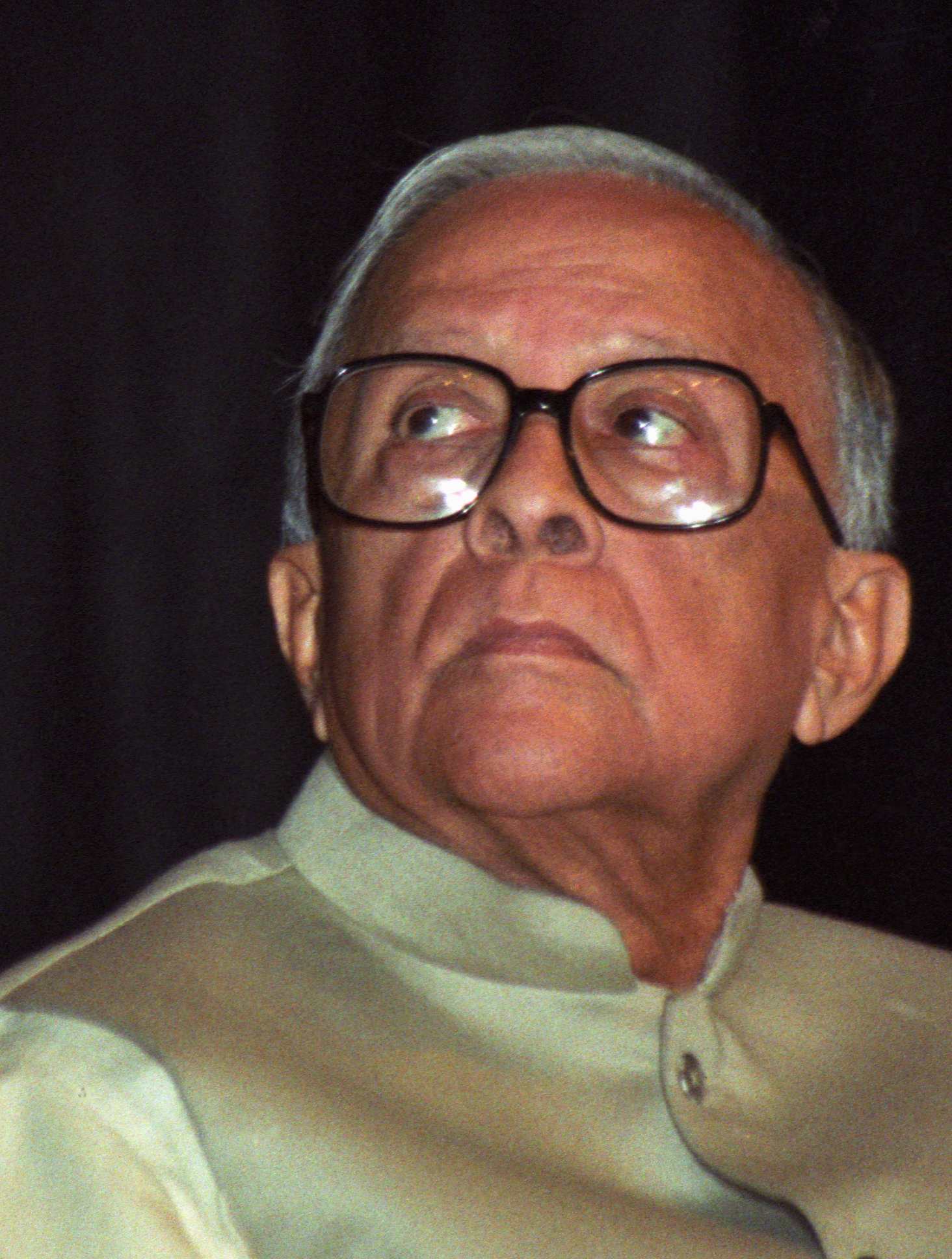
	Majority party	Minority party	Third party
		CPI
Leader	Siddhartha Shankar Ray	Biswanath Mukherjee	Jyoti Basu
Party	INC(R)	CPI	CPI(M)
Alliance	PDA	PDA	ULF
Leader since	1972	1964	1964
Leader's seat	Maldaha (by-elected)	Medinipur	Baranagar (lost)
Last election	29.19%, 105 seats	8.46%, 13 seats	32.86%, 113 seats
Seats won	216	35	14
Seat change	▲111	▲22	▼99
Popular vote	6,543,251	1,110,579	3,659,808
Percentage	49.08%	8.33%	27.45%
Swing	▲19.89 pp	▼0.13 pp	▼5.41 pp
Chief Minister before election
Ajoy Kumar Mukherjee
Bangla Congress
Chief Minister after election
Siddhartha Shankar Ray
INC(R)

Legislative Assembly elections were held in the Indian state of West Bengal on March 11, 1972.

== Background ==
The election was the 4th assembly election in West Bengal within six years. In the previous assembly election held last year, Ajoy Mukherjee of Bangla Congress became the chief minister with support of the INC(R) & the United Left Democratic Front (an alliance of CPI, AIFB, SSP rebels, PSP, BPI - Barada Mukutmoni faction, RCPI - Anadi Das faction & AIGL). President's Rule had been introduced on 29 June 1971 due to fallout of the Congress(R) (with which the Bangla Congress had merged) with the ULDF.

== Contenders ==
There were two main fronts in the election; the alliance between the Congress(R) and CPI and the alliance led by CPI(M). The Congress(R)-CPI alliance was known as the Progressive Democratic Alliance. The PDA had a seven-point programme. At the time of the election Indira Gandhi's popularity peaked, with the victory in the Bangladesh Liberation War and electoral promises of land reform. The CPI had also gained significant prestige in West Bengal due to the Soviet support to the Bangladeshi cause in the war.

The CPI(M)-led alliance included RSP, SUCI, RCPI, MFB, WPI, the Biplobi Bangla Congress and some independents. Just before the vote there was a seat-sharing arrangement between the CPI(M)-led alliance and the AIFB. A minor third front, the West Bengal Democratic Alliance, was led by the Congress (O) and included Sushil Kumar Dhara's Bangla Congress faction, the SSP rebels and the Indian Awami League.

== Results ==
The Congress(R)-CPI alliance or the Progressive Democratic Alliance won an overwhelming majority in the assembly and formed a new state government, led by Siddhartha Shankar Ray. Several Indian Youth Congress leaders were found among the newly elected legislators. 14 CPI(M) candidates were declared elected, but they refused to participate in the Legislative Assembly during the period of 1972-1977 as they accused that the elections had been rigged.

Alliance/ Party		Popular vote		Seats	
Alliance/ Party		Votes	%	Contested	Won
PDA	INC(R)	6,543,251	49.08	238	216
PDA	CPI	1,110,579	8.33	41	35
PDA	Total	7,653,830	57.41%	279	251
ULF	CPI(M)	3,659,808	27.45	208	14
ULF	AIFB	331,244	2.48	18	0
ULF	RSP	284,643	2.14	17	3
ULF	SUCI	238,276	1.79	13	1
ULF	WPI	63,673	0.48	3	1
ULF	RCPI	31,437	0.24	3	0
ULF	MFB	17,422	0.13	1	0
ULF	BBC	11,835	0.09	1	0
ULF	Total	4,638,338	34.80%	264	19
NCO+	INC(O)	196,044	1.47	64	2
NCO+	Total	160,360	1.47%	64	2
AIGL		35,802	0.27%	3	2
IUML		121,208	0.91%	27	1
SOP		109,062	0.82%	26	0
BJS		251,149	0.19%	16	0
HMS		2,646	0.02%	3	0
JKP		688.06	0.52%	20	0
RPI		3,885	0.03%	5	0
Others		605,677	4.54%	0	0
IND		472,556	3.54%	116	5
Total		13,331,517	100%	280	280
Valid votes		13,331,517	97.18		
Invalid/Blank votes		387,018	2.82		
Total votes		13,718,535	100.00		
Registered voters/Turnout		22,554,545	60.82		
source: ECI

== Results by constituency ==
No.	Constituency	Res.	United Left Front (CPI(M)+ AIFB+ SUCI+ RSP+ WPI+RCPI+ MFB+ BBC+ Independents) (Missing some independent candidates)					Progressive Democratic Alliance (Congress (R)+ CPI )					Other (Listing the most-voted candidate) West Bengal Democratic Alliance (INC(O) + SSP + IAL) + ABGL + IUML + BJS + HMS + JKP + RPI and Others				
No.	Constituency	Res.	Candidate	Party	Votes	%	Rank	Candidate	Party	Votes	%	Rank	Candidate	Party	Votes	%	Rank
1	Mekliganj	SC	Amarendranath Roy Prodhan	FB	18233	40.77%	2nd	Mauhusudan Roy	Cong. (R)	25816	57.72%	Won	Sudhangshu Kumar Sarkar	Ind.	675	1.51%	3rd
2	Mathabhanga	SC	Dinesh Chandra Dakua	CPI(M)	18173	39.80%	2nd	Birendra Nath Roy	Cong. (R)	27493	60.20%	Won					
3	Cooch Behar West	SC	Ajit Kumar Basunia	FB	14120	31.43%	2nd	Rajani Das	Cong. (R)	30804	68.57%	Won					
4	Sitai		Dipak Sen Gupta	FB	15345	34.93%	2nd	M O Fazle Haque	Cong. (R)	28592	65.07%	Won					
5	Dinhata		Kamal Guha	FB	20712	39.85%	2nd	Jogesh Chandra Sarkar	Cong. (R)	30404	58.50%	Won	Ram Chandra Saha	Ind.	855	1.65%	3rd
6	Cooch Behar North		Aparajita Goppi	FB	19846	40.07%	2nd	Sunil Kar	Cong. (R)	29142	58.84%	Won	Jaharuddin Mia	Cong. (O)	541	1.09%	3rd
7	Cooch Behar South		Sibendra N Chowdhury	CPI(M)	17196	36.52%	2nd	Santosh Kumar Roy	Cong. (R)	29600	62.86%	Won	Rai Mohan Roy	Ind.	293	0.62%	3rd
8	Tufanganj	SC	Manindra Nath Barman	CPI(M)	16697	32.70%	2nd	Isore Sisit Kumar	Cong. (R)	34364	67.30%	Won					
9	Kumargram		Nitai Chandra Das	CPI(M)	12061	32.10%	2nd	Debabrata Chatterjee	Cong. (R)	25515	67.90%	Won					
10	Kalchini	ST	John Arther Baxla Uraon	RSP	11353	37.84%	2nd	Denis Lakra	Cong. (R)	15447	51.48%	Won	Philip Minj	Ind.	3203	10.68%	3rd
11	Alipurduars		Nani Bhattacharya	RSP	20928	42.49%	2nd	Naryan Bhattacharya	Cong. (R)	27386	55.61%	Won	Kalikrishna Bhattacharya	Ind.	935	1.90%	3rd
12	Falakata	SC						Jagadananda Roy	Cong. (R)	25203	64.17%	Won	Pushpajit Barman	Soc.	14072	35.83%	2nd
13	Madarihat	ST	A. H. Besterwitch	RSP	16785	43.70%	Won	Aswaghosh Kullu	Cong. (R)	13667	35.58%	2nd	Khudiram Pahan	Ind.	7961	20.72%	3rd
14	Dhupguri							Bhawani Paul	Cong. (R)	22670	57.39%	Won	Nishith Nath Bhowmik	Soc.	13810	34.96%	2nd
15	Nagrakata	ST	Punai Oraon	CPI(M)	14463	38.58%	2nd	Prem Oraon	CPI	21429	57.16%	Won	Mangroo Bhagat	Ind.	1600	4.27%	3rd
16	Mainaguri	SC	Jatindra Nath Basunia	RSP	8318	23.84%	2nd	Bijoy Krishna Mohanta	Cong. (R)	19716	56.50%	Won	Panchanan Mallick	Ind.	6862	19.66%	3rd
17	Mal	ST	Jagga Nath Oraon	CPI(M)	16030	38.19%	2nd	Antoni Topno	Cong. (R)	25939	61.81%	Won					
18	Jalpaiguri		Subodh Sen	CPI(M)	19064	35.77%	2nd	Anupam Sen	Cong. (R)	34231	64.23%	Won					
19	Rajganj	SC	Dhirendra Nath Roy	CPI(M)	11503	31.19%	2nd	Mrigendra Narayan Roy	Cong. (R)	21853	59.26%	Won	Heramba Deb Raikat	Soc.	3521	9.55%	3rd
20	Kalimpong		Ramashnaker Prasad	CPI(M)	3325	12.27%	4th	Gajendra Gurung	Cong. (R)	10190	37.60%	Won	Prithiwinath Dikshit	Gorkha League	8806	32.49%	2nd
21	Darjeeling		G.S. Gurung	Ind.	9476	28.77%	2nd	P.P. Rai	Cong. (R)	7331	22.26%	3rd	Deo Prakash Rai	Gorkha League	14933	45.34%	Won
22	Jore Bungalow		Ananda Prasad Pathak	CPI(M)	11031	31.20%	3rd	Dawa Bomjan	Cong. (R)	11517	32.58%	2nd	Nanda Lal Gurung	Gorkha League	12063	34.12%	Won
23	Siliguri		Biren Bose	CPI(M)	12226	29.91%	2nd	Arun Kumar Moitra	Cong. (R)	26728	65.39%	Won	Benoy Roy	Ind.	1305	3.19%	3rd
24	Phansidewa	ST	Patras	CPI(M)	16912	37.74%	2nd	Iswar Chandra Tirkey	Cong. (R)	27894	62.26%	Won					
25	Chopra		Bachcha Munshi	CPI(M)	13540	36.16%	2nd	Chowdhary Abdul Karim	Cong. (R)	23612	63.05%	Won	Ismail	Soc.	296	0.79%	3rd
26	Goalpokhar							Sheikh Sharafat Hussain	Cong. (R)	15527	54.20%	Won	Nizamuddin	Muslim League	10485	36.60%	2nd
27	Karandighi		Singha Suresh Chandra	Ind	17681	44.34%	2nd	Haji Sajjad Hussain	Cong. (R)	19500	48.90%	Won	Choudhury Golam Rasun	Soc.	1435	3.60%	3rd
28	Raiganj		Manash Roy	CPI(M)	13610	31.16%	2nd	Dutta Ramendranath	Cong. (R)	28727	65.77%	Won	Brajendra Chandra Roy	Soc.	855	1.96%	3rd
29	Kaliaganj	SC	Nani Gopal Roy	CPI(M)	9681	27.30%	2nd	Debendra Nath Roy	Cong. (R)	24243	68.37%	Won	Kailas Sarkar	Cong. (O)	1050	2.96%	3rd
30	Itahar		Santi Sarkar	CPI(M)	10543	21.80%	2nd	Abedin Dr. Zainal	Cong. (R)	37810	78.20%	Won					
31	Kushmandi	SC	Jogendra Nath Ray	RSP	7478	23.46%	2nd	Jatindra Mohan Roy	Cong. (R)	24403	76.54%	Won					
32	Gangarampur		Ahindra Sarkar	CPI(M)	12265	28.31%	2nd	Moslehuddin Ahmed	Cong. (R)	30554	70.53%	Won	Mardi Karlus Mandal	JKP	500	1.15%	3rd
33	Kumarganj		Jamini Kishore Mojumder	CPI(M)	18857	40.42%	2nd	Probodh Kumar Singha Roy	Cong. (R)	27790	59.58%	Won					
34	Balurghat		Basu Mukul	RSP	23526	44.04%	2nd	Bireswar Roy	Cong. (R)	28894	54.09%	Won	Singh Nakul	JKP	395	0.74%	3rd
35	Tapan	ST	Nathanial Murmu	RSP	20035	41.24%	2nd	Patrash Hembrem	Cong. (R)	28166	57.97%	Won	Kisku Gomai	JKP	384	0.79%	3rd
36	Habibpur	ST	Sarkar Murmu	CPI(M)	13207	29.51%	2nd	Rabindra Nath Murmu	CPI	27027	60.40%	Won	Boila Murmu	Ind.	4514	10.09%	3rd
37	Gajol	ST	Suphal Murmu	CPI(M)	14561	33.54%	2nd	Benjamin Hembrom	Cong. (R)	26075	60.05%	Won	Samu Tudu	BJS	2783	6.41%	3rd
38	Kharba		Mazimul Haque	CPI(M)	24843	46.50%	2nd	Mahabubul Haque	Cong. (R)	25512	47.75%	Won	Birendra Kumar Maitra	Cong. (O)	3074	5.75%	3rd
39	Harishchandrapur		Md. Elias Razi	WPI	21418	46.35%	2nd	Goutam Chakravarty	Cong. (R)	23433	50.71%	Won	Peskar Ali	Cong. (O)	1361	2.95%	3rd
40	Ratua		Mohammad Ali	CPI(M)	18668	45.33%	2nd	Nirenchandra Sinha	Cong. (R)	21755	52.83%	Won	Ali Nabed	Ind.	755	1.83%	3rd
41	Malda		Mohammad Ilias	CPI(M)	16286	37.26%	2nd	Mohamadgofurur Rahaman	Cong. (R)	27420	62.74%	Won					
42	Englishbazar		Sailendra Sarkar	CPI(M)	14281	31.24%	2nd	Bimal Das	CPI	25116	54.94%	Won	Hari Prasanna Misra	BJS	6319	13.82%	3rd
43	Manikchak		Sudhendu Jha	CPI(M)	18036	41.47%	2nd	Jokhilal Mondal	Cong. (R)	25460	58.53%	Won					
44	Suzapur							A. B. A. Ghani Khan Choudhury	Cong. (R)	32911	70.09%	Won	Mannak Sk	Ind.	9418	20.06%	2nd
45	Kaliachak		Dhirendra Nath Saha	RSP	7459	13.53%	3rd	Samsuddin Ahamed	Cong. (R)	23933	43.41%	Won	Promode Ranjan Bose	Ind.	23740	43.06%	2nd
46	Farakka		Jerat Ali	CPI(M)	20787	44.10%	Won	Md Wazed Ali	Cong. (R)	19112	40.55%	2nd	Sohidul Alam	Muslim League	7234	15.35%	3rd
47	Suti		Shish Mohammad	RSP	27085	49.21%	Won	Md. Sohrab	Cong. (R)	25565	46.45%	2nd	Sarker Benoy Bhusan	Ind.	2388	4.34%	3rd
48	Jangipur		Achintya Singha	SUC	14292	35.52%	2nd	Habibur Rahman	Cong. (R)	17035	42.33%	Won	Chattopadhyay Muktipada	Ind.	4816	11.97%	3rd
49	Sagardighi	SC	Joy Chand Das	RSP	11566	36.83%	2nd	Nrisinha Kumar Mandal	Cong. (R)	17824	56.75%	Won	Guru Pada Das	Muslim League	2018	6.43%	3rd
50	Lalgola		Md Majibur Rahman	CPI(M)	13018	31.78%	2nd	Abdus Sattar	Cong. (R)	24409	59.60%	Won	Jagannath Pandey	Ind.	2715	6.63%	3rd
51	Bhagabangola							Mohammad Dedar Baksh	Cong. (R)	22016	63.07%	Won	Adhicary Sailendra Nath	Soc.	5312	15.22%	2nd
52	Nabagram		Birendra Narayan Roy	Ind	19660	44.87%	2nd	Adya Chanran Dutta	Cong. (R)	22154	50.57%	Won	Delowar Hossain Saikh	Muslim League	806	1.84%	3rd
53	Murshidabad		Jarzis Hussain Sarkar	CPI(M)	16975	39.36%	2nd	Mohammad Idrai Ali	Cong. (R)	21871	50.71%	Won	Nawab Jany Meerza	Muslim League	2808	6.51%	3rd
54	Jalangi		Atahar Rahaman Age	CPI(M)	13676	40.14%	2nd	Abdul Bari Biswas	Cong. (R)	14463	42.45%	Won	Prafulla Kumar Sarkar	BJS	2661	7.81%	3rd
55	Domkal		Md Abdul Bari	CPI(M)	21668	47.21%	2nd	Biswas Ekramul Haque	Cong. (R)	22299	48.58%	Won	Mandal Rafiluddin	Muslim League	1932	4.21%	3rd
56	Naoda		Jayanta Kumar Biswas	RSP	14993	32.64%	2nd	Abdul Majid Biswas	Cong. (R)	13032	28.37%	3rd	Nasiruddin Khan	Muslim League	15792	34.38%	Won
57	Hariharpara		Abu Raihan Biswas	SUC	21315	44.99%	Won	Main L Islam Biswas	Cong. (R)	18585	39.22%	2nd	Aftabuddin Ahmad	Muslim League	5525	11.66%	3rd
58	Berhampore		Debabrata Bandopadhyay	RSP	14661	31.80%	2nd	Sankar Das Paul	Cong. (R)	31448	68.20%	Won					
59	Beldanga		Timir Baran Bhaduri	RSP	18084	40.43%	Won	Abdul Latif	Cong. (R)	16581	37.07%	2nd	Khan Sidhique Hosain	Muslim League	9028	20.18%	3rd
60	Kandi		Damodardas Chattopadhyay	CPI(M)	14148	29.45%	2nd	Atish Chandra Sinha	Cong. (R)	33900	70.55%	Won					
61	Khargram	SC	Dinabandhu Majhi	CPI(M)	17280	35.96%	2nd	Harendra Nath Halder	Cong. (R)	30780	64.04%	Won					
62	Barwan		Amalendra Lal Roy	RSP	16284	40.93%	2nd	Ghosh Moulik Sunil Mohan	Cong. (R)	23497	59.07%	Won					
63	Bharatpur		Kh Md Nure Ahasan	CPI(M)	17824	42.75%	2nd	Kumar Dipti Sen Gupta	Cong. (R)	23320	55.93%	Won	Sk Abu Talib	Muslim League	398	0.95%	3rd
64	Karimpur		Samarendra Nath Sanyal	CPI(M)	16019	35.45%	2nd	Arabinda Mandal	Cong. (R)	27557	60.98%	Won	Kazi Saidul Islam Biswas	Ind.	1611	3.57%	3rd
65	Tehatta		Madhabendu Mohanta	CPI(M)	18835	39.96%	2nd	Karti Chandra Biswas	Cong. (R)	27455	58.25%	Won	Kazi Md Mowla Boksh	Muslim League	844	1.79%	3rd
66	Kaliganj		Mir Fakir Mohammad	CPI(M)	15757	34.00%	2nd	Shib Sankar Bandopdchayay	Cong. (R)	19077	41.16%	Won	Rame Dra Nath Mukherjee	Ind.	8536	18.42%	3rd
67	Nakashipara	SC	Binoy Bhusan Majumder	CPI(M)	13808	36.58%	2nd	Nil Kamal Sarker	Cong. (R)	20753	54.99%	Won	Govindo Chandra Mondal	Muslim League	2821	7.47%	3rd
68	Chapra		Sahabuddin Mondal	CPI(M)	16228	35.61%	2nd	Ghiasuddin Ahmad	Cong. (R)	27514	60.37%	Won	Kabir Humayun Mondal	Muslim League	1835	4.03%	3rd
69	Nabadwip		Debi Prosad Basu	CPI(M)	13504	26.93%	2nd	Radha Raman Saha	Cong. (R)	34745	69.30%	Won	Saghcndra Mohon Nandy	Cong. (O)	1888	3.77%	3rd
70	Krishnagar West		Amritendu Mukherjee	CPI(M)	14982	36.60%	2nd	Sibdas Mukherjee	Cong. (R)	25952	63.40%	Won					
71	Krishnagar East		Nrisinghananda Dutta	CPI(M)	10332	23.14%	2nd	Kashi Kanta Maitra	Cong. (R)	33847	75.80%	Won	Subodh Ranjan Chakravarty	Ind.	472	1.06%	3rd
72	Hanskhali	SC	Mukunda Biswas	CPI(M)	15569	31.52%	2nd	Ananda Mohan Biswas	Cong. (R)	33829	68.48%	Won					
73	Santipur		Bimalananda Mukherjee	RCPI	18626	40.58%	2nd	Asamanja De	Cong. (R)	27272	59.42%	Won					
74	Ranaghat West		Kundu Gourchandra	CPI(M)	24715	39.48%	2nd	Naresh Chandra Chaki	Cong. (R)	37892	60.52%	Won					
75	Ranaghat East	SC	Naresh Chandra Biswas	CPI(M)	14795	32.39%	2nd	Netaipada Sarkar	CPI	30104	65.91%	Won	Santosh Kumar Mondal	Cong. (O)	776	1.70%	3rd
76	Chakdah		Basu Subhas Chandra	CPI(M)	24576	42.58%	2nd	Haridas Mitra	Cong. (R)	33144	57.42%	Won					
77	Haringhata		Anigopal Malakar	CPI(M)	22663	41.96%	2nd	Bhattacharya Sakti Kumar	CPI	30328	56.16%	Won	Sarker Arendra Nath	Cong. (O)	1016	1.88%	3rd
78	Bagdaha	SC	Kanti Chandra Biswas	CPI(M)	14347	36.68%	2nd						Apurba Lal Mazumder	Ind.	24769	63.32%	Won
79	Bongaon		Ranjit Kumar Mitra	CPI(M)	15445	35.30%	2nd	Ajit Kumar Ganguly	CPI	28310	64.70%	Won					
80	Gaighata		Keshab Lal Biswas	CPI(M)	15331	33.66%	2nd	Chadipada Mitra	Cong. (R)	30217	66.34%	Won					
81	Ashokenagar		Nani Kar	CPI(M)	19737	35.23%	2nd	Sadhan Kumar Sen	CPI	11936	21.30%	3rd	Keshab Chandra Battacharjee	Ind.	23869	42.60%	Won
82	Barasat		Saral Deb	FB	22835	40.30%	2nd	Kanti Rangan Chatterjee	Cong. (R)	32988	58.22%	Won	Sunil Sekhar Mandal	Ind.	842	1.49%	3rd
83	Rajarhat	SC	Rabindra Nath Mandal	CPI(M)	26037	44.65%	2nd	Khasendra Nath Mandal	Cong. (R)	32282	55.35%	Won					
84	Deganga							M. Shaukat Ali	Cong. (R)	19314	41.34%	Won	Akm Hassan Uzzaman	Muslim League	18969	40.60%	2nd
85	Habra		Anwam Mandal	CPI(M)	17378	30.50%	2nd	Tarun Kanti Ghosh	Cong. (R)	37613	66.02%	Won	Malulana Md Abdul Khayer	Muslim League	1182	2.07%	3rd
86	Swarupnagar		Anisur Rahaman	CPI(M)	13232	27.97%	2nd	Chandranath Misra	Cong. (R)	33669	71.17%	Won	Panchanan Mondal	Cong. (O)	405	0.86%	3rd
87	Baduria		Mir Abdus Sayeed	CPI(M)	17399	35.71%	2nd	Quazi Abdul Gaffar	Cong. (R)	31320	64.29%	Won					
88	Basirhat		Narayan Mukherjee	CPI(M)	17610	37.07%	2nd	Lalit Kumar Ghosh	Cong. (R)	29897	62.93%	Won					
89	Hasnabad		Khaled Bin Ashraf	CPI(M)	12817	33.65%	2nd	Molla Tasma Tulla	Cong. (R)	25274	66.35%	Won					
90	Hingalganj	SC	Gopal Chandra Gayen	CPI(M)	15033	34.78%	2nd	Anil Krishna Mondal	CPI	15436	35.71%	Won	Aditya Mondal	Ind.	11614	26.87%	3rd
91	Gosaba	SC	Ganesh Mondal	RSP	21888	43.22%	2nd	Paresh Baidya	Cong. (R)	26867	53.05%	Won	Tarang Mondal	RPI	1308	2.58%	3rd
92	Sandeshkhali	ST	Sarat Sarder	CPI(M)	21905	46.94%	2nd	Debendra Nath Sinha	Cong. (R)	24764	53.06%	Won					
93	Haroa	SC	Jagannath Sardar	CPI(M)	17935	45.78%	2nd	Gangadhar Pramanick	Cong. (R)	21239	54.22%	Won					
94	Basanti		Ashoke Chaudhuri	RSP	23650	44.72%	2nd	Panchanan Sinha	Cong. (R)	26873	50.82%	Won	Jnanendra Prasad Barman	Muslim League	2359	4.46%	3rd
95	Canning	SC	Nirmal Kumar Sinha	CPI(M)	22416	41.83%	2nd	Gobinda Chandra Naskar	Cong. (R)	30676	57.25%	Won	Bibhuti Bhushan Sardar	PBI	490	0.91%	3rd
96	Kultali	SC	Prabodh Purkait	SUC	27217	45.22%	2nd	Arabinda Naskar	Cong. (R)	32968	54.78%	Won					
97	Jaynagar		Subodh Banerjee	SUC	27840	48.40%	2nd	Prosun Kumar Ghosh	Cong. (R)	29675	51.60%	Won					
98	Baruipur	SC	Bimal Mistri	CPI(M)	22878	41.26%	2nd	Lalit Gayen	Cong. (R)	30579	55.15%	Won	Promatha Sarader	Muslim League	1629	2.94%	3rd
99	Sonarpur	SC	Gangadhar Naskar	CPI(M)	23328	42.66%	2nd	Kansari Halder	CPI	30700	56.14%	Won	Abinas Haldar	RPI	463	0.85%	3rd
100	Bhangar		Abdur Razzak Molla	CPI(M)	13459	33.60%	Won	Md Nuruzzaman	Cong. (R)	11593	28.94%	2nd	Molla Mohammed Yunus	Muslim League	10951	27.34%	3rd
101	Jadhavpur		Dinesh Majumder	CPI(M)	40939	55.71%	Won	Biswanath Chakrabarty	Cong. (R)	31297	42.59%	2nd	Satya Sarkar	RPI	692	0.94%	3rd
102	Behala East		Nirajan Mukherjee	CPI(M)	18733	39.30%	2nd	Indrajit Majumder	Cong. (R)	28939	60.70%	Won					
103	Behala West		Rabi Mukherjee	CPI(M)	30024	48.45%	2nd	Biswanath Chakraborty	CPI	31939	51.55%	Won					
104	Garden Reach		Chhedilal Singh	CPI(M)	25625	50.43%	Won	S. M. Abdullah	Cong. (R)	24245	47.71%	2nd	Ram Saran	RPI	945	1.86%	3rd
105	Maheshtola		Sudhir Bhandari	CPI(M)	25581	43.36%	2nd	Bhupen Bijali	Cong. (R)	33412	56.64%	Won					
106	Budge Budge		Khitibhusan Roy Barman	CPI(M)	34873	61.55%	Won	Bhowani Roy Choudhuroy	CPI	21783	38.45%	2nd					
107	Bishnupur West		Provash Chandra Roy	CPI(M)	28540	49.27%	Won	Shaik Moquebul Haque	Cong. (R)	27945	48.24%	2nd	Jugal Charan Santra	Cong. (O)	1440	2.49%	3rd
108	Bishnupur East	SC	Sundar Kumar Naskar	CPI(M)	20750	41.38%	2nd	Ram Krishna Bar	Cong. (R)	29390	58.62%	Won					
109	Falta		Jyotish Roy	CPI(M)	24747	45.40%	2nd	Mohini Mohan Parui	Cong. (R)	29277	53.71%	Won	Nasim Molla	IAL	486	0.89%	3rd
110	Diamond Harbour		Abdul Quiyom Molla	CPI(M)	26861	43.10%	2nd	Daulat Ali Sheikh	Cong. (R)	35457	56.90%	Won					
111	Magrahat East	SC	Radhika Ranjan Pramanik	CPI(M)	25902	42.66%	2nd	Manoranjan Halder	Cong. (R)	34533	56.88%	Won	Narendra Nath Mandal	Ind.	281	0.46%	3rd
112	Magrahat West		Abdus Sobhn Gazi	CPI(M)	26146	45.85%	2nd	Sudhendu Mundle	Cong. (R)	29475	51.69%	Won	Paresh Kayal	Cong. (O)	1401	2.46%	3rd
113	Kulpi	SC	Sasanka Sekhar Naiya	SUC	15555	32.42%	2nd	Santosh Kumar Mandal	Cong. (R)	31067	64.76%	Won	Ramesh Haldar	Cong. (O)	1218	2.54%	3rd
114	Mathurapur	SC	Renu Pada Halder	SUC	23564	41.15%	2nd	Birendra Nath Halder	Cong. (R)	32562	56.86%	Won	Makhan Chandra Baidya	Ind.	1041	1.82%	3rd
115	Patharpratima		Rabin Mondal	SUC	29657	48.60%	2nd	Satya Ranjan Bapuly	Cong. (R)	30213	49.51%	Won	Phani Bhushan Giri	Ind.	1154	1.89%	3rd
116	Kakdwip		Hrishikesh Maity	CPI(M)	25067	40.51%	2nd	Basudeb Sautya	Cong. (R)	36812	59.49%	Won					
117	Sagar		Prabhonjan Kumar Mandal	CPI(M)	24942	42.69%	Won	Jalin Maity	CPI	12012	20.56%	3rd	Trilokes Misra	Ind.	19295	33.03%	2nd
118	Bijpur		J. C. Das S/O Matilal	CPI(M)	25336	38.77%	2nd	J. C. Das S/O Akul	Cong. (R)	40017	61.23%	Won					
119	Naihati		Gopal Basu	CPI(M)	33466	46.89%	2nd	Tarapoda Mukhapadya	Cong. (R)	37511	52.55%	Won	Bholanath Bhar	Ind.	401	0.56%	3rd
120	Bhatpara		Sita Ram Gupta	CPI(M)	35680	41.83%	2nd	Satyanarayan Singha	Cong. (R)	49187	57.66%	Won	Lal Bahadur Singha	BJS	440	0.52%	3rd
121	Noapara		Jamini Bhuson Saha	CPI(M)	22599	31.61%	2nd	Suvendu Roy	Cong. (R)	48112	67.30%	Won	Santi Ranjan Pathak	Ind.	480	0.67%	3rd
122	Titagarh		Md. Amin	CPI(M)	23158	31.37%	2nd	Krishnakumar Shukla	Cong. (R)	50656	68.63%	Won					
123	Khardah		Sadhan Kumar Chakraborty	CPI(M)	21813	25.88%	2nd	Sisirkumar Ghosh	CPI	62460	74.12%	Won					
124	Panihati		G. K. Bhattacharjee	CPI(M)	27540	26.79%	2nd	Tapan Chatterjee	Cong. (R)	74765	72.74%	Won	S. K. Bhakta Bhakta	RPI	477	0.46%	3rd
125	Kamarhati		Radhika Ranjan Banerji	CPI(M)	22524	43.47%	2nd	Pradip Kumar Palit	Cong. (R)	28690	55.37%	Won	Prasad Das Ray	Ind.	601	1.16%	3rd
126	Baranagar		Jyoti Basu	CPI(M)	30158	30.37%	2nd	Shiba Pada Bhattacharjee	CPI	69145	69.63%	Won					
127	Dum Dum		Tarun Kumar Sengupta	CPI(M)	15023	14.08%	2nd	Lal Bahadur Singh	Cong. (R)	91428	85.71%	Won	Sudhangsu Debsarma	Ind.	216	0.20%	3rd
128	Cossipur		Paresh Nath Banerjee	CPI(M)	15075	28.25%	2nd	Prafulla Kanti Ghosh	Cong. (R)	38290	71.75%	Won					
129	Shampukur		Rathindra Krishna Deb	CPI(M)	14667	31.89%	2nd	Baridbaran Das	Cong. (R)	30463	66.24%	Won	Ramendra Kumar Bisnu	Ind.	688	1.50%	3rd
130	Jorabagan		Haraprasad Chatterjee	CPI(M)	13064	23.46%	2nd	Ila Roy	Cong. (R)	42631	76.54%	Won					
131	Jora Sanko		Lal Satyanarayan	CPI(M)	10777	27.76%	2nd	Deokinandan Poddar	Cong. (R)	27887	71.84%	Won	Jagmohan Prasad	Ind.	153	0.39%	3rd
132	Bara Bazar		Murlidhar Santhalia	CPI(M)	7682	21.33%	2nd	Ramkrishna Saraogi	Cong. (R)	27606	76.66%	Won	Om Prakash	Ind.	522	1.45%	3rd
133	Bow Bazar		Hashim Abdul Halim	CPI(M)	13838	35.36%	2nd	Bijoy Singh Nahar	Cong. (R)	25292	64.64%	Won					
134	Chowringhee		Amal Dutta	CPI(M)	9851	29.40%	2nd	Sankar Ghose	Cong. (R)	23654	70.60%	Won					
135	Kabitirtha		Kalimuddin Shams	FB	27685	48.78%	2nd	Ram Payare Ram	Cong. (R)	28565	50.33%	Won	Binapani Dubey	Ind.	344	0.61%	3rd
136	Alipore		P. Jha	CPI(M)	13226	29.08%	2nd	Kanailalsarkar	Cong. (R)	31277	68.76%	Won	Durga Dutt Agarwal	Cong. (O)	985	2.17%	3rd
137	Kalighat		Ashoke Kumar Bose	CPI(M)	16511	33.70%	2nd	Rathin Talukdar	Cong. (R)	31835	64.97%	Won	Bejoy Bhusan Chatterrjee	HMS	507	1.03%	3rd
138	Rashbehari Avenue		Sachin Sen	CPI(M)	11422	26.58%	2nd	Lakshmi Kanta Bose	Cong. (R)	31548	73.42%	Won					
139	Tollygunge		Prasanta Kumar Sur	CPI(M)	28372	36.62%	2nd	Pankaj Kumar Banerjee	Cong. (R)	49096	63.38%	Won					
140	Dhakuria		Jatin Chakraborty	RSP	20550	38.63%	2nd	Somnath Lahiri	CPI	32641	61.37%	Won					
141	Ballygunge		Jyoti Bhusan Bhattacharya	WPI	18181	35.49%	2nd	Subrata Mukhopadhaya	Cong. (R)	32845	64.12%	Won	Ananta Lal Singh	Ind.	196	0.38%	3rd
142	Beliaghata South	SC	Sumanta Hira	CPI(M)	10999	22.78%	2nd	Ardhendu Sekhar Naskar	Cong. (R)	37284	77.22%	Won					
143	Entally		Md. Nizamuddin	CPI(M)	20303	42.59%	2nd	A.M.O. Ghani	CPI	27371	57.41%	Won					
144	Taltola		Abul Hassan	CPI(M)	17355	45.41%	2nd	Abdur Rauf Ansari	Cong. (R)	20717	54.20%	Won	Stanley James	Ind.	150	0.39%	3rd
145	Sealdah		Shyam Sundar Gupta	FB	16098	30.30%	2nd	Somendra Nath Mitra	Cong. (R)	37023	69.70%	Won					
146	Vidyasagar		Samar Kumar Rudra	CPI(M)	16799	37.91%	2nd	Md. Shamsuzzoha	Cong. (R)	27515	62.09%	Won					
147	Beliaghata North		Krishnapada Ghosh	CPI(M)	14839	21.60%	2nd	Ananta Kumar Bharati	Cong. (R)	53875	78.40%	Won					
148	Manicktola		Anila Debi	CPI(M)	21622	32.61%	2nd	Ila Mitra	CPI	43238	65.21%	Won	Premananda Bose	Cong. (O)	948	1.43%	3rd
149	Burtola		Lakshmi Kanta Dey	CPI(M)	12781	28.43%	2nd	Ajit Kumar Panja	Cong. (R)	30778	68.46%	Won	Asim Banerjee	Cong. (O)	1397	3.11%	3rd
150	Belgachia		Lakshmi Charansen	CPI(M)	24660	40.17%	2nd	Ganapati Sur	Cong. (R)	36734	59.83%	Won					
151	Bally		Patit Pabon Pathak	CPI(M)	22522	43.84%	2nd	Bhabani Sankar Mukerjee	Cong. (R)	28857	56.16%	Won					
152	Howrah North		Chaittabrata Mazumdar	CPI(M)	18463	40.83%	2nd	Shankar Lal Mukherjee	Cong. (R)	26753	59.17%	Won					
153	Howrah Central		Sudhindranath Kumar	RCPI	15870	37.77%	2nd	Mrityunjoy Banerjee	Cong. (R)	25326	60.28%	Won	Bipul Sarkar	Cong. (O)	817	1.94%	3rd
154	Howrah South		Pralay Talukdar	CPI(M)	20655	41.07%	2nd	Santi Kumar Das Gupta	Cong. (R)	28657	56.98%	Won	Bhola Shaw	Cong. (O)	979	1.95%	3rd
155	Shibpur		Kanai Lal Bhattacharya	FB	24941	43.87%	2nd	Mrigendra Mukherjee	Cong. (R)	31109	54.71%	Won	Sailen Parbat	Cong. (O)	808	1.42%	3rd
156	Domjur		Joykesh Mukherjee	CPI(M)	29675	48.49%	2nd	Krishna Pada Roy	Cong. (R)	30550	49.92%	Won	Debendra Nath Mondal	Cong. (O)	979	1.60%	3rd
157	Jagatballavpur		Tara Pada Dey	CPI(M)	24063	49.23%	Won	Mohammad Elias	CPI	22433	45.90%	2nd	Biswaratan Gangully	Cong. (O)	2378	4.87%	3rd
158	Panchla		Asoke Kumar Ghosh	CPI(M)	21944	40.89%	2nd	Sk. Anwar Ali	Cong. (R)	29900	55.72%	Won	Kazi Hazi Mahiuddin	IAL	850	1.58%	3rd
159	Sankrail	SC	Haran Hazra	CPI(M)	26712	53.11%	Won	Arabinda Naskar	Cong. (R)	23585	46.89%	2nd					
160	Uluberia North	SC	Raj Kumar Mandal	CPI(M)	31885	53.88%	Won	Gobinda Sing	Cong. (R)	857	1.45%	4th	Santosh Kr. Bhowmick	Ind.	24386	41.21%	2nd
161	Uluberia South		Bata Krisn Das	CPI(M)	23034	45.89%	2nd	Durga Sankar Roy	Cong. (R)	1197	2.38%	4th	Rabindra Ghose	Ind.	23316	46.45%	Won
162	Shyampur		Sasabindu Bera	FB	29601	48.92%	2nd	Sisir Kumar Sen	Cong. (R)	30294	50.06%	Won	Krishna Pada Jana	Cong. (O)	615	1.02%	3rd
163	Begnan		Nirupama Chatterjee	CPI(M)	24802	47.20%	2nd	Susanta Bhattacharjee	Cong. (R)	26030	49.54%	Won	Prakas Chandra Mandal	Cong. (O)	1420	2.70%	3rd
164	Kalyanpur		Nitai Adak	CPI(M)	19662	37.19%	2nd	Ali Ansar	CPI	32138	60.79%	Won	Manik Lal Mitra	Cong. (O)	1066	2.02%	3rd
165	Amta		Barindra Koley	CPI(M)	24710	47.12%	2nd	Afiabuddin Mondal	Cong. (R)	26322	50.19%	Won	Nirmal Kumar Roy	Cong. (O)	1411	2.69%	3rd
166	Udaynarayanpur		Panna Lal Maji	CPI(M)	23955	43.66%	2nd	Saroj Karar	Cong. (R)	30915	56.34%	Won					
167	Jangipara		Manindra Nath Jana	CPI(M)	22485	48.43%	2nd	Ganesh Hatui	Cong. (R)	23939	51.57%	Won					
168	Chanditala		Kazi Safiulla	CPI(M)	18561	45.79%	2nd	Safiulla	Cong. (R)	21978	54.21%	Won					
169	Uttarpara		Santasri Chattopadhyay	CPI(M)	27053	50.01%	Won	Gobida Chatterjee	CPI	27045	49.99%	2nd					
170	Serampore		Kamal Krishna Bhattacharya	CPI(M)	22984	37.51%	2nd	Gopal Das Nag	Cong. (R)	37152	60.62%	Won	Sankari Prosad Mukhopadhyaa	Cong. (O)	1146	1.87%	3rd
171	Champdani		Haripada Mukhopadhyay	CPI(M)	23509	46.31%	2nd	Girija Bhusan Mukhopadhyaya	CPI	26026	51.27%	Won	Bisaldeo Singh	Cong. (O)	973	1.92%	3rd
172	Chandernagore		Bhabani Mukherjee	CPI(M)	28366	49.37%	Won	Beri Shaw	Cong. (R)	28327	49.30%	2nd	Prokash Chandra Das	Ind.	764	1.33%	3rd
173	Singur		Gopal Bandopadhya	CPI(M)	21155	39.16%	2nd	Ajit Kumar Basu	CPI	30213	55.93%	Won	Probhakar Pal	Cong. (O)	2655	4.91%	3rd
174	Haripal		Chittaranjan Basu	WPI	24074	50.85%	Won	Chandra Sekhar Bank	Cong. (R)	23131	48.86%	2nd	Krishikesh Dey	Ind.	137	0.29%	3rd
175	Chinsurah		Ghose Sambhu Charan	FB	24869	45.04%	2nd	Bhupaju Majumdar	Cong. (R)	29635	53.67%	Won	Sanat Majumdar	Cong. (O)	713	1.29%	3rd
176	Polba		Brojo Gopal Negoy	CPI(M)	23545	43.42%	2nd	Bhawant Pd. Sinha Roy	Cong. (R)	29787	54.94%	Won	Kazi Mohammad Ali	Ind.	889	1.64%	3rd
177	Balagarh	SC	Abinash Pramanik	CPI(M)	21880	45.08%	2nd	Biren Sarkar	Cong. (R)	26660	54.92%	Won					
178	Pandua		Deb Narayan Chakraborty	CPI(M)	20329	41.04%	2nd	Sailendra Chaootpadhyay	Cong. (R)	29211	58.96%	Won					
179	Dhaniakhali	SC	Kashi Nath Roy	CPI(M)	22750	44.00%	2nd	Kashi Nath Patra	Cong. (R)	28957	56.00%	Won					
180	Tarakeswar		Ram Chatterjee	Ind	23758	45.70%	2nd	Balai Lal Sheth	Cong. (R)	28224	54.30%	Won					
181	Pursurah		Mrinal Kanti Majumder	Ind	15594	30.98%	2nd	Mahadeb Mukhopadhya	Cong. (R)	32324	64.21%	Won	Monoranjan Maity	Cong. (O)	2421	4.81%	3rd
182	Khanakul	SC	Madan Mohan Saha	CPI(M)	16023	35.88%	2nd	Basudeb Hajra	Cong. (R)	27100	60.69%	Won	Panchanan Digpati	Cong. (O)	1528	3.42%	3rd
183	Arambagh		Sastiram Chattopadhyay	CPI(M)	9559	18.24%	3rd	Santi Mohan Roy	Cong. (R)	13953	26.63%	2nd	Prafulla Chandra Sen	Cong. (O)	28885	55.13%	Won
184	Goghat	SC	Arati Biswas	FB	15515	42.41%	2nd	Madan Mohan Medda	Cong. (R)	18708	51.14%	Won	Nanuram Roy	Cong. (O)	1777	4.86%	3rd
185	Chandrakona		Sorashi Chowdhury	CPI(M)	21343	43.19%	2nd	Ghosal Satya	CPI	26382	53.38%	Won	Madhusudan Chakraborty	Cong. (O)	887	1.79%	3rd
186	Ghatal	SC	Nanda Rani Dal	CPI(M)	22554	47.58%	2nd	Dolui Harisadhan	Cong. (R)	24847	52.42%	Won					
187	Daspur		Prabhas Chandra Phodikar	CPI(M)	21021	38.85%	2nd	Sudhir Chandra Bera	Cong. (R)	31865	58.89%	Won	Bhukta Rampada	Ind.	1223	2.26%	3rd
188	Panskura West		Mono Anjan Roy	CPI(M)	9209	21.63%	2nd	Sk. Omar Ali	CPI	28090	65.99%	Won	Harekrishna Pattanayak	Cong. (O)	5268	12.38%	3rd
189	Panskura East		Amar Prasad Chakravarty	FB	11313	27.82%	2nd	Geeta Mukherjee	CPI	29356	72.18%	Won					
190	Moyna		Pulak Bera	CPI(M)	14929	31.41%	2nd	Kanai Bhowmik	CPI	28493	59.94%	Won	Ananga Mohan Das	Cong. (O)	4115	8.66%	3rd
191	Tamluk		Deva Prasad Bhowmik	CPI(M)	11040	24.26%	2nd	Ajoy Kumar Mukherjee	Cong. (R)	33924	74.54%	Won	Mangorinda Manna	Ind.	547	1.20%	3rd
192	Mahishadal		Dinabahdhu Mandal	CPI(M)	9158	16.97%	3rd	Ahindra Misra	Cong. (R)	33906	62.84%	Won	Sushil Kumar Dhara	Ind.	10896	20.19%	2nd
193	Sutahata	SC	Lakshman Chandra Seth	CPI(M)	13182	25.82%	2nd	Rabindra Nath Karan	CPI	25641	50.22%	Won	Shibanath Das	Ind.	12232	23.96%	3rd
194	Nandigram		Rabindra Nath Majti	CPI(M)	7468	12.54%	3rd	Bhupal Chandra Panda	CPI	27610	46.35%	Won	Abha Maiti	Cong. (O)	23461	39.38%	2nd
195	Narghat		Swades Kumar Manna	CPI(M)	13439	24.87%	2nd	Sardindu Samanta	Cong. (R)	30974	57.32%	Won	Bankim Behari Maity	Ind.	9626	17.81%	3rd
196	Bhagabanpur		Pradhan Prasanta Kumar	CPI(M)	16274	32.70%	2nd	Adhayapak Amales Jana	Cong. (R)	21815	43.83%	Won	Haripada Jana	Cong. (O)	9922	19.93%	3rd
197	Khajuri	SC	Jagadish Chandra Das	CPI(M)	11753	25.88%	2nd	Bimal Paik	Cong. (R)	28003	61.67%	Won	Abanti Kumar Das	Cong. (O)	3759	8.28%	3rd
198	Contai North		Anurup Panda	CPI(M)	12376	25.24%	2nd	Kamakhyanandan Das Mohapatr	CPI	24922	50.83%	Won	Ras Behari Pal	Cong. (O)	7275	14.84%	3rd
199	Contai South		Kar Ram Sankar	CPI(M)	5723	12.56%	3rd	Sudhir Chandra Das	Ind.	20001	43.90%	Won	Satyabrata Maity	Cong. (O)	19834	43.54%	2nd
200	Ramnagar		Karan Rohini	CPI(M)	8821	19.81%	2nd	Hemanta Dutta	Cong. (R)	24763	55.62%	Won	Radhagobinda Bishal	Cong. (O)	5059	11.36%	3rd
201	Egra		Nanigopal Pal	CPI(M)	7233	14.45%	3rd	Khan Samsul Alam	Cong. (R)	21624	43.20%	Won	Prabodh Chandra Sinha	Soc.	21197	42.35%	2nd
202	Mugberia		Amarendra Krishan Goswami	CPI(M)	13936	29.81%	2nd	Prasanta Kumar Sahoo	Cong. (R)	24070	51.48%	Won	Janmenjoy Ojha	Soc.	8256	17.66%	3rd
203	Pataspur		Jagdish Das	CPI(M)	13087	27.89%	2nd	Prafulla Maity	Cong. (R)	33844	72.11%	Won					
204	Pingla		Gouranga Samanta	Ind	20335	40.46%	2nd	Bijoy Das	Cong. (R)	29460	58.62%	Won	Manik Murmu	JKP	464	0.92%	3rd
205	Debra		Sibaram Basu	CPI(M)	17394	37.32%	2nd	Rabindra Nath Bera	Cong. (R)	27921	59.91%	Won	Champa Besra	JKP	854	1.83%	3rd
206	Keshpur	SC	Kunar Mhimangsu	CPI(M)	19954	39.70%	2nd	Rajani Kanta Doloi	Cong. (R)	29055	57.81%	Won	Gour Hari Pardiya	JKP	1251	2.49%	3rd
207	Garhbeta East	SC	Bhutu Doloi	CPI(M)	14891	35.13%	2nd	Krishna Prasad Duley	CPI	23269	54.89%	Won	Kali Kinkar Chalak	Cong. (O)	3176	7.49%	3rd
208	Garhbeta West		Manohar Mahata	CPI(M)	14650	33.74%	2nd	Saroj Roy	CPI	23073	53.15%	Won	Tudu Prankrishna	JKP	4182	9.63%	3rd
209	Salbani		Sundar Hazra	CPI(M)	16199	36.67%	2nd	Thakurdas Mahata	CPI	21281	48.18%	Won	Birendra Nath Hembram	JKP	6690	15.15%	3rd
210	Midnapur		Anima Ghosh Roy	CPI(M)	7882	18.96%	2nd	Biswanath Mukherjee	CPI	32009	76.99%	Won	Gurudas Mandi	JKP	1076	2.59%	3rd
211	Kharagpur		Jatindra Nath Mitra	CPI(M)	7093	20.97%	2nd	Gyan Singh Sohanpal	Cong. (R)	26732	79.03%	Won					
212	Kharagpur Local		Sheikh Siraj Ali	CPI(M)	15075	35.27%	2nd	Ajit Kumar Basu	Cong. (R)	26481	61.95%	Won	Purna Tudu	JKP	1188	2.78%	3rd
213	Narayangarh		Ajit Dasmahapatra	CPI(M)	11014	23.58%	2nd	Braja Kishore Maiti	Cong. (R)	33591	71.91%	Won	Laha Mihir Kumar	Ind.	2110	4.52%	3rd
214	Dantan		Mukherjee Durgadas	CPI(M)	6711	14.72%	3rd	Dwibedi Rabindranath	CPI	17371	38.10%	2nd	Pradyot Kumar Mahanti	Cong. (O)	21506	47.17%	Won
215	Keshiari	ST	Kisku Jadunath	CPI(M)	17443	41.37%	2nd	Budhan Chandra Tudu	Cong. (R)	22697	53.83%	Won	Anil Hembram	JKP	1447	3.43%	3rd
216	Nayagram	ST						Dasarathi Saren	Cong. (R)	18933	49.12%	Won	Birendra Nath Murmu	Soc.	12525	32.50%	2nd
217	Gopiballavpur		Mahapatra Monoranjan	CPI(M)	18334	37.25%	2nd	Harish Chandra Mahapatra	Cong. (R)	28353	57.61%	Won	Hembram Sanatan	JKP	1877	3.81%	3rd
218	Jhargram		Sen Dahareshwar	CPI(M)	14626	29.48%	2nd	Malla Deb Birendra Bijoy	Cong. (R)	25951	52.31%	Won	Mahata Mrinalini	JKP	7310	14.73%	3rd
219	Binpur	ST						Saren Joyram	CPI	24701	57.20%	Won	Shyam Charan Murmu	JKP	15496	35.88%	2nd
220	Banduan	ST	Ramesh Majhi	CPI(M)	9362	34.32%	2nd	Sital Chandra Hembram	Cong. (R)	14609	53.55%	Won	Jagadish Majhi	JKP	1838	6.74%	3rd
221	Manbazar		Makul Mahato	CPI(M)	18487	48.13%	2nd	Sitaram Mahato	Cong. (R)	19920	51.87%	Won					
222	Balarampur	ST	Bikram Tudu	CPI(M)	13813	45.82%	2nd	Rup Singh Majhi	Cong. (R)	16330	54.18%	Won					
223	Arsa		Daman Chandra Kuiri	FB	13315	49.60%	2nd	Netai Deshmukh	Cong. (R)	13532	50.40%	Won					
224	Jhalda		Chittaranjan Mahato	FB	17421	48.06%	2nd	Kinkar Mahato	Cong. (R)	18831	51.94%	Won					
225	Jaipur		Murali Saha Babu	FB	4060	17.36%	2nd	Ramkrishna Mahato	Cong. (R)	15640	66.87%	Won	Padma Lochan Mahato	Soc.	3690	15.78%	3rd
226	Purulia		Mahadeb Mukherjee	CPI(M)	11978	34.15%	2nd	Sanat Kumar Mukherjee	Cong. (R)	23098	65.85%	Won					
227	Para	SC	Sailen Bauri	SUC	10723	42.42%	2nd	Sarat Das	Cong. (R)	13249	52.41%	Won	Chandi Charan Das	Ind.	988	3.91%	3rd
228	Raghunathpur	SC	Hari Ada Bauri	SUC	13485	49.34%	2nd	Durgadas Bauri	Cong. (R)	13846	50.66%	Won					
229	Kashipur		Basudeb Acharia	CPI(M)	9949	40.07%	2nd	Madan Mohan Mahato	Cong. (R)	14220	57.28%	Won	Rajaram Mahato	Ind.	658	2.65%	3rd
230	Hura		Dela Hembram	SUC	11560	40.94%	2nd	Shtadal Mahato	Cong. (R)	15127	53.58%	Won	Shkti Pada Mukherjee	Ind.	1546	5.48%	3rd
231	Taldangra		Panda Mohini Mohan	CPI(M)	20660	40.94%	2nd	Phani Bhusan Singha Babu	Cong. (R)	27644	54.78%	Won	Lakshmi Kanta Saren	JKP	2160	4.28%	3rd
232	Raipur	ST						Manik Lal Besra	CPI	24919	62.20%	Won	Sareng Babulal	JKP	12140	30.30%	2nd
233	Ranibandh	ST	SUChand Soren	CPI(M)	17678	45.84%	2nd	Amala Saren	Cong. (R)	19081	49.47%	Won	Hansda Fagal	JKP	1808	4.69%	3rd
234	Indpur	SC	Gourhari Mandal	BBC	13407	39.38%	2nd	Gour Chandra Lohar	Cong. (R)	19523	57.34%	Won	Ashok Kumar Mandal	Ind.	1115	3.28%	3rd
235	Chhatna		Arun Kiran Barat	SUC	10547	35.67%	2nd	Kamalakanta Hemram	Cong. (R)	14896	50.38%	Won	Dey Nirmalendu	Cong. (O)	2664	9.01%	3rd
236	Gangajalghati	SC	Kali Pada Bauri	CPI(M)	14056	40.97%	2nd	Shakti Pada Maji	Cong. (R)	20253	59.03%	Won					
237	Barjora		Aswani Kumar Rai	CPI(M)	21130	43.72%	2nd	Sudhangshu Sekhar Tewary	Cong. (R)	27196	56.28%	Won					
238	Bankura		Sumitra Chatterjee	CPI(M)	16315	35.42%	2nd	Kashinath Misra	Cong. (R)	28082	60.96%	Won	Arup Mukhopadhyaya	HMS	1053	2.29%	3rd
239	Onda		Dutta Manik	CPI(M)	14333	38.39%	2nd	Sambhu Narayan Goswami	Cong. (R)	19679	52.71%	Won	Sachindra Kumar Banerjee	Ind.	1874	5.02%	3rd
240	Vishnupur		Karunamey Goswami	CPI(M)	12354	35.30%	2nd	Bhabataran Chakravarty	Cong. (R)	20455	58.45%	Won	Tushar Kanti Bhattacharya	BJS	1437	4.11%	3rd
241	Kotulpur		Jatadhari Mukhopadhyay	CPI(M)	11673	27.60%	2nd	Akshay Kumar Kolay	Cong. (R)	29054	68.70%	Won	Chowdhury Bankim Chnadra	Ind.	1564	3.70%	3rd
242	Indas	SC	Badan Bora	CPI(M)	16380	39.08%	2nd	Sanatan Snatra	Cong. (R)	24156	57.63%	Won	Rupkumar Bagdi	Cong. (O)	1382	3.30%	3rd
243	Sonamukhi	SC	Sukhendu Khan	CPI(M)	15317	37.44%	2nd	Guru Pada Khan	Cong. (R)	24403	59.64%	Won	Madan Lohar	Ind.	1194	2.92%	3rd
244	Hirapur		Ramapada Mukherjee	CPI(M)	18068	46.07%	2nd	Triptimoy Aich	Cong. (R)	19068	48.62%	Won	Tarak Nath Chakrabarty	Soc.	2081	5.31%	3rd
245	Kulti		Chandra Shekhar Mukhapadhya	CPI(M)	8541	30.44%	2nd	Ramdas Banerjee	Cong. (R)	16687	59.47%	Won	Sohan Prasad Varma	Soc.	2832	10.09%	3rd
246	Barabani		Sunil Basu Roy	CPI(M)	11150	27.04%	2nd	Sukumar Bandyopadhyay	Cong. (R)	29214	70.85%	Won	Nalinaksha Roy	Soc.	867	2.10%	3rd
247	Asansol		Bejoy Pal	CPI(M)	15940	38.95%	2nd	Niranjan Dihidar	CPI	24021	58.70%	Won	Mihir Kumar Mukherjee	BJS	488	1.19%	3rd
248	Raniganj		Haradhan Roy	CPI(M)	21840	60.77%	Won	Rabindra Nath Mukherjee	Cong. (R)	13598	37.84%	2nd	Sibnarayan Burman	Cong. (O)	498	1.39%	3rd
249	Jamuria	SC	Durgadas Mondal	CPI(M)	10391	41.73%	2nd	Amarendra Mondal	Cong. (R)	14508	58.27%	Won					
250	Ukhra	SC	Bagdi Lakhan	CPI(M)	13490	38.74%	2nd	Gopal Mondal	Cong. (R)	21329	61.26%	Won					
251	Durgapur		Dilip Kumar Mazumdar	CPI(M)	37348	44.07%	2nd	Ananda Gopal Mukherjee	Cong. (R)	47390	55.93%	Won					
252	Faridpur		Tarun Kumar Chatterjee	CPI(M)	18840	45.36%	2nd	Ajit Kumar Bandyopadhyay	Cong. (R)	21274	51.22%	Won	Niroda Prosad Mukherjee	Ind.	1103	2.66%	3rd
253	Ausgram	SC	Sridhar Malik	CPI(M)	24021	50.34%	Won	Bans Dhar Saha	Cong. (R)	23692	49.66%	2nd					
254	Bhatar		Anath Bandhu Ghose	CPI(M)	11974	27.34%	2nd	Bholanath Sen	Cong. (R)	31822	72.66%	Won					
255	Galsi		Anil Roy	CPI(M)	18145	43.18%	2nd	Roy Aswini	CPI	22486	53.51%	Won	Khan Abdul Kader	Cong. (O)	1389	3.31%	3rd
256	Burdwan North		Debabrata Datta	CPI(M)	17595	32.34%	2nd	Kashinath Ta	Cong. (R)	36808	67.66%	Won					
257	Burdwan South		Chowdhury Benoy Krishna	CPI(M)	18544	28.25%	2nd	Pradip Bhattacharyya	Cong. (R)	47092	71.75%	Won					
258	Khandaghosh	SC	Purna Chandra Malik	CPI(M)	17451	37.20%	2nd	Monoranjan Pramanik	Cong. (R)	29463	62.80%	Won					
259	Raina		Gokulananda Roy	CPI(M)	22671	43.62%	2nd	Sukumar Chattopadhay	Cong. (R)	29297	56.38%	Won					
260	Jamalpur	SC	Narendra Nath Sarkar	Ind	15935	34.08%	2nd	Puranjoy Pramanik	Cong. (R)	30827	65.92%	Won					
261	Memari		Benoy Krishna Konar	CPI(M)	11239	16.97%	2nd	Naba Kumar Chatterjee	Cong. (R)	53119	80.20%	Won	Iotu Murmu	Ind.	1876	2.83%	3rd
262	Kalna		Dilip Kumar Dubey	CPI(M)	952	1.49%	2nd	Nurul Islam Mollah	Cong. (R)	62476	97.81%	Won	Soren Madhu	Ind.	444	0.70%	3rd
263	Nadanghat		Syed Abul Mansur Habibullah	CPI(M)	2641	4.06%	2nd	Paresh Chandra Goswami	Cong. (R)	61617	94.80%	Won	Mandi Sankar	Ind.	738	1.14%	3rd
264	Manteswar		Kashinath Hazra Choudhury	CPI(M)	5159	8.74%	2nd	Tumin Kumar Samanta	Cong. (R)	53768	91.05%	Won	Bhakta Chandra Roy	Cong. (O)	125	0.21%	3rd
265	Purbasthali		Molia Humayun Kabir	CPI(M)	14746	31.22%	2nd	Nurunnesa Sattar	Cong. (R)	32486	68.78%	Won					
266	Katwa		Hara Mohan Sinha	CPI(M)	21703	39.63%	2nd	Subrata Mukherje	Cong. (R)	33061	60.37%	Won					
267	Mangalkot		Nikhilananda Sar	CPI(M)	18118	40.75%	2nd	Jyotirmoy Mojumdar	Cong. (R)	25379	57.08%	Won	Madan Mohan Choudhury	Cong. (O)	962	2.16%	3rd
268	Ketugram	SC	Dinabandhbu Majhi	CPI(M)	17483	36.79%	2nd	Prabha Kar Mandal	Cong. (R)	30044	63.21%	Won					
269	Nanur	SC	Banamali Das	CPI(M)	17743	41.49%	2nd	Saha Dulal	Cong. (R)	25018	58.51%	Won					
270	Bolpur		Mukherjee Prasanth	CPI(M)	13906	38.23%	2nd	Harasankar Bhattacharya	CPI	17732	48.74%	Won	Ashoke Krishna Dutt	Cong. (O)	3606	9.91%	3rd
271	Labhpur		Sunil Majumder	CPI(M)	14976	49.46%	2nd	Nirmal Krishna Sinha	CPI	15304	50.54%	Won					
272	Dubrajpur		Bhakti Bhushan Mandal	FB	17066	46.07%	2nd	Sachi Nandan Shaw	Cong. (R)	19975	53.93%	Won					
273	Rajnagar	SC	Gopa Bauri	FB	18269	47.25%	2nd	Dwija Pada Saha	Cong. (R)	20392	52.75%	Won					
274	Suri		Protiva Mukherjee	SUC	20894	44.01%	2nd	Suniti Chattaraj	Cong. (R)	26579	55.99%	Won					
275	Mahammad Bazar		Dhiren Sen	CPI(M)	16183	45.29%	2nd	Nitai Pada Ghosh	Cong. (R)	19552	54.71%	Won					
276	Mayureswar	SC	Panchanan Let	CPI(M)	13936	46.86%	2nd	Lalchand Fulamali	CPI	15089	50.74%	Won	Dhwajadhari Let	Cong. (O)	712	2.39%	3rd
277	Rampurhat		Braja Mohan Mukherjee	CPI(M)	17061	43.37%	2nd	Ananda Gopal Roy	Cong. (R)	21151	53.77%	Won	Becharam Sarkar	Ind.	1127	2.86%	3rd
278	Hansan	SC	Trilochan Mal	RCPI	12542	42.01%	2nd	Dhanapati Mal	Cong. (R)	17077	57.20%	Won	Sanjay Kumar Saha	Cong. (O)	236	0.79%	3rd
279	Nalhati		Golam Mohiuddin	Ind.	12932	46.11%	Won	Syed Shah Nawaz	Cong. (R)	9902	35.31%	2nd	Molia Zahrul Islam	Muslim League	2787	9.94%	3rd
280	Murarai		Bazle Ahmad	SUC	11627	29.49%	2nd	Motahar Hossain	Cong. (R)	25883	65.64%	Won	Chatterjee Bhabani Prosad	Ind.	1921	4.87%	3rd

== Reception ==
While there were several killings during the election campaign, electoral violence had declined compared to previous elections in West Bengal.

The elections were marred by accusations of rigging. CPI(M) and its allies refused to accept the election result. The left parties argued that in 172 constituencies the election had not been free and fair, accusing the Congress(R) of letting loose 'semi-fascist terror' in West Bengal. They protested by interrupting the President's speech in the Lok Sabha and in the Rajya Sabha. The Congress(O) also made accusations of rigging. The former Chief Minister Prafulla Chandra Sen on the other hand alleged that the election had been rigged in at least 45 constituencies.
