= Mir Abdus Sayeed =

Mir Abdus Sayeed (died 2004) was an Indian trade unionist and politician, belonging to the Communist Party of India (Marxist). He was the president of the Forward Seamens Union of India (FSUI), and a Member of the West Bengal Legislative Assembly 1969-1970 and 1979-1987.

== Biography ==
As of 1952 M.A. Sayeed was the general secretary of the United Seamen's Union in Calcutta. He was part of an Indian trade union delegation that took part in a month-long visit to China in connection with the May Day celebrations of 1952.

The Communist Party of India fielded M.A. Sayeed as its candidate for the Baduria seat in the 1962 West Bengal Legislative Assembly election. M.A. Sayeed finished in second place with 20,146 votes (43.85%). M.A. Sayeed sided with the CPI(M) in the 1964 split in the Communist Party of India. CPI(M) fielded M.A. Sayeed as its candidate in Baduria in the 1967 West Bengal Legislative Assembly election, in which he finished in second place with 17,820 votes (33.60%).

M.A. Sayeed contested the Baduria seat for a third time in the 1969 West Bengal Legislative Assembly election, this time winning the seat with 29,718 votes (54.95%). In the 1971 West Bengal Legislative Assembly election the CPI(M) fielded M.A. Sayeed as its candidate in the Kabitirtha seat, where he finished in third place with 12,036 votes (26.49%). In the subsequent 1972 West Bengal Legislative Assembly election, he contested the Baduria seat and finished in second place with 17,399 votes (35.71%).

M.A. Sayeed returned to the West Bengal Legislative Assembly in 1979. He contested a by-election for the Maheshtala seat, held after the death of incumbent legislator Sudhir Chandra Bhandari. M.A. Sayeed obtained 45,259 votes (76.18%). He retained the Maheshtala seat in the 1982 West Bengal Legislative Assembly election, obtaining 40,523 votes (63.15%).

As of the 1980s and early 1990s M.A. Sayeed was the president of the Forward Seamens Union of India (FSUI). He was a member of the General Council of the Centre for Indian Trade Unions (CITU).

Mir Abdus Sayeed died in 2004.
