= Siddhartha Majumdar =

Indian politician (born 1982)

Siddhartha Majumdar (born 1982) is an Indian politician from West Bengal. He is a member of West Bengal Legislative Assembly from the Kalna Assembly constituency, which is reserved for Scheduled Caste community, in Purba Bardhaman district representing the Bharatiya Janata Party.

== Early life and education ==
Majumdar is from Baranagar, Purba Bardhaman district, West Bengal. He is the son of Sandipan Majumder. He completed his Master of Business from Symbiosis International University in 2009. He is in corporate service. He declared assets worth Rs.24 lakhs in 2019 and Rs.1 crore in 2026, in his affidavits to the Election Commission of India.

== Career ==
Majumdar won the Kalna Assembly constituency representing the Bharatiya Janata Party in the 2026 West Bengal Legislative Assembly election. He polled 1,10,790 votes and defeated his nearest rival and sitting MLA, Deboprasad Bag of the All India Trinamool Congress (AITC), by a margin of 28,630 votes.
