= Biswajit Kundu =

Indian politician

Biswajit Kundu (born 1974) is an Indian politician from West Bengal. He is a former two time member of the West Bengal Legislative Assembly from Kalna Assembly constituency, which is reserved for Scheduled Caste community, in Purba Bardhaman district. He was elected in the 2016 West Bengal Legislative Assembly election representing the All India Trinamool Congress.

== Early life and education ==
Kundu is from Kalna, Purba Bardhaman district, West Bengal. He is the son of late Ramnarayan Kundu. He studied Class 10 and passed the Madhyamik Pariksha conducted by West Bengal Board of Secondary Education in 1992. He runs his own business while his wife is a school teacher.

== Career ==
Kundu was first elected as an MLA from Kalna Assembly constituency representing the All India Trinamool Congress in the 2011 West Bengal Legislative Assembly election. He polled 85,096 votes and defeated his nearest rival, Sukul Chandra Sikdar of the Communist Party of India (Marxist), by a margin of 12,637 votes. He retained the seat for the Trinamool Congress winning the 2016 West Bengal Legislative Assembly election. In 2016, he polled votes and once again defeated his closest opponent, Sikdar of the Communist Party, by a margin of 25,261 votes. He later shifted to the Bharatiya Janata Party and lost the 2021 West Bengal Legislative Assembly election to Deboprosad Bag (Poltu) of the Trinamool Congress by a margin of 7,478 votes.
