= A.M.O. Ghani =

Indian politician (1903–1973)

Abu Asad Mohammed Obaidul Ghani

Member of the West Bengal Legislative Assembly for Entally
- In office 1957–1971
- Preceded by: Devendra Chandra Dev
- Succeeded by: Mohammed Nizamuddin

Member of the West Bengal Legislative Assembly for Entally
- In office 1972–1973
- Preceded by: Mohammed Nizamuddin
- Succeeded by: Sachindra Kumar Dhar

Personal details
- Born: 3 January 1903
- Died: 24 September 1973 (aged 70)
- Party: Communist Party of India
- Profession: Medical doctor

Abu Asad Mohammed Obaidul Ghani (1903–1973), also referred to as A.M.O. Ghani, was an Indian politician, belonging to the Communist Party of India.

== Youth ==
Obaidul Ghani's grandfather, Maulvi Elahad, had moved from Darbhanga, Bihar to Calcutta in the mid-19th century. After obtaining his M.B.B.S. degree he founded the Park Circus charitable dispensary in 1950, serving the poor and lower middle-class populations of the city. Obaidul Ghani contested the 1952 West Bengal Legislative Assembly election as an independent, standing in the Baniapukur Ballygung constituency. He obtained 524 votes (0.88%).

== Legislator ==
Obaidul Ghani represented the Entally constituency in the West Bengal Legislative Assembly 1957–1971, standing as a CPI candidate in the 1957, 1962, 1967 and 1969 elections. As a politician, he obtained significant popularity for his provision of medical services to the poor people of Calcutta. He stayed with CPI in the 1964 split. In August 1969 the Modern Furnishers Mazdoor Union was registered, with Obaidul Ghani as its president. The union was affiliated to the All India Trade Union Congress.

He lost the Entally seat to Mohammed Nizamuddin of the Communist Party of India (Marxist) in the 1971 West Bengal Legislative Assembly election. He managed to defeat Mohammed Nizamuddin in the 1972 West Bengal Legislative Assembly election and regained the Entally seat.

== Death and legacy ==
Obaidul Ghani died following an attack of coronary thrombosis on 24 September 1973. After Obaidul Ghani's death, a by-election was held for the Entally seat on 3 June 1974. The by-poll was won by Sachindra Kumar Dhar.

There is a road named "Dr. A.M.O. Ghani Road" in Ward 64 of Kolkata. Obaidul Ghani used to live on this road, which was previously known as 'Pearl Road'. The new name was issued on 1 April 1974. There is also a "Dr. A.M.O. Gani Memorial Primary School" and a "Dr. A.M.O. Gani Memorial Girls School" in Ballygunge.
