= Ajit Kumar Jana =

Indian politician (born 1955)

Member of the West Bengal Legislative Assembly
- Incumbent
- Assumed office 4 May 2026
- Preceded by: Bikram Chandra Pradhan
- Constituency: Dantan

Personal details
- Party: Bharatiya Janata Party
- Profession: Politician

Ajit Kumar Jana (born 1955) is an Indian politician from West Bengal. He is a member of the West Bengal Legislative Assembly from the Dantan Assembly constituency in Paschim Medinipur district representing the Bharatiya Janata Party.

== Early life and education ==
Jana is from Dantan, Paschim Medinipur district, West Bengal. He is the son of the late Gangaram Jana. He completed his Bachelor of Commerce in 1979 at Jhargram Raj College which is affiliated with University of Calcutta. He runs his own business. He declared assets worth Rs.14 crore in his affidavit to the Election Commission of India.

== Career ==
Jana won the Dantan Assembly constituency representing the Bharatiya Janata Party in the 2026 West Bengal Legislative Assembly election. He polled 1,10,259 votes and defeated his nearest rival, Manik Maiti of the All India Trinamool Congress, by a margin of 10,376 votes.
