= Prodyot Kumar Mahanti =

Indian politician

Prodyot Kumar Mahanti (born c.1940) is an Indian former politician. Mahanti was elected to the West Bengal Legislative Assembly from the Dantan constituency in the 1972 West Bengal Legislative Assembly election, then a 32-year old lawyer and Congress (O) candidate. Mahanti won the Dantan seat again as a Janata Party candidate in 1977 and lost to CPI candidate Kanai Bhowmick in 1982 . In the 1987 West Bengal Legislative Assembly election he was contested from the Patashpur constituency as a Congress (I) candidate and lost to CPI candidate Kamakhya Nandan Das Mohapatra .
