= Bamapada Mukherjee =

Indian politician (died 2019)

Bamapada Mukherjee বামাপদ মুখোপাধ্যায়

MLA of Hirapur Vidhan Sabha Constituency
- In office 1969–1972
- Preceded by: Shibdas Ghatak
- Succeeded by: Triptimoy Aich
- In office 1977–1987
- Preceded by: Triptimoy Aich
- Succeeded by: Suhrid Basu Mallick

Mayor of Asansol Municipal Corporation
- In office 1994–1999

Personal details
- Born: 1921/22
- Died: 13 April 2019
- Party: Communist Party of India (Marxist)

Bampada Mukherjee was an Indian politician. He was elected as MLA of Hirapur Vidhan Sabha Constituency in 1969, 1971, 1977 and 1982. He was the first Mayor of Asansol Municipal Corporation. He died on 13 April 2019 at the age of 97.
