= Patashpur Assembly constituency =

Patashpur
- Constituency No. 212 for the West Bengal Legislative Assembly
- Interactive Map Outlining Patashpur Assembly Constituency

Constituency details
- Country: India
- Region: East India
- State: West Bengal
- District: Purba Medinipur
- Lok Sabha constituency: Kanthi
- Established: 1951
- Total electors: 2,36,413
- Reservation: None

Member of Legislative Assembly
- 18th West Bengal Legislative Assembly
- Incumbent Tapan Maity
- Party: BJP
- Alliance: NDA
- Elected year: 2026

Patashpur Assembly constituency is an assembly constituency in Purba Medinipur district in the Indian state of West Bengal.

== Overview ==
As per orders of the Delimitation Commission, No. 212 Patashpur Assembly constituency is composed of the following: Patashpur I community development block; Khargram, Panchet, Pataspur, South Khanda and Sreerampur gram panchayats of Patashpur II community development block.

Patashpur Assembly constituency is part of No. 31 Kanthi (Lok Sabha constituency). It was earlier part of Midnapore (Lok Sabha constituency).

== Members of the Legislative Assembly ==
| Year | M.L.A. | Party |
|---|---|---|
| 1952 | Janardhan Sahu | Bharatiya Jana Sangh |
| 1957 | Sisir Kumar Das | Praja Socialist Party |
| 1962 | Radhanath Das Adhikari | Indian National Congress |
| 1967 | Kamakhya Nandan Das Mohapatra | Communist Party of India |
| 1969 | Kamakhya Nandan Das Mohapatra | Communist Party of India |
| 1971 | Prafulla Maity | Communist Party of India |
| 1972 | Prafulla Maity | Communist Party of India |
| 1977 | Janmejoy Ojha | Janata Party |
| 1982 | Kamakhya Nandan Das Mohapatra | Communist Party of India |
| 1987 | Kamakhya Nandan Das Mohapatra | Communist Party of India |
| 1991 | Kamakhya Nandan Das Mohapatra | Communist Party of India |
| 1996 | Kamakhya Nandan Das Mohapatra | Communist Party of India |
| 2001 | Kamakhya Nandan Das Mohapatra | Communist Party of India |
| 2006 | Kamakhya Nandan Das Mohapatra | Communist Party of India |
| 2011 | Jyotirmoy Kar | Trinamool Congress |
| 2016 | Jyotirmoy Kar | Trinamool Congress |
| 2021 | Uttam Barik | Trinamool Congress |
| 2026 | Tapan Maity | Bharatiya Janata Party |

== Election results ==
=== 2026 ===
2026 West Bengal Legislative Assembly election: Patashpur
| Party | Candidate | Votes | % | ±% |
|---|---|---|---|---|
| BJP | Tapan Maity | 116,589 | 50.24 | ▲4.6 |
| AITC | Pijus Kanti Panda | 107,538 | 46.34 | ▼4.08 |
| CPI | Saikat Giri | 4,595 | 1.98 | ▼1.2 |
| NOTA | None of the above | 836 | 0.36 | ▼0.05 |
| Majority | | 9,051 | 3.9 | ▼0.88 |
| Turnout | | 232,048 | 93.75 | ▲5.42 |
| BJP gain from AITC | | Swing | | |

=== 2021 ===
West Bengal assembly elections, 2021: Patashpur
| Party | Candidate | Votes | % | ±% |
|---|---|---|---|---|
| AITC | Uttam Barik | 105,299 | 50.42 | |
| BJP | Ambujaksha Mahanti | 95,305 | 45.64 | +40.28 |
| CPI | Saikat Giri | 6,631 | 3.18 | −35.6 |
| NOTA | None of the above | 861 | 0.41 | |
| Majority | | 9,994 | 4.78 | |
| Turnout | | 208,827 | 88.33 | |
| AITC hold | | Swing | | |

=== 2016 ===
West Bengal assembly elections, 2016: Patashpur
| Party | Candidate | Votes | % | ±% |
|---|---|---|---|---|
| AITC | Jyotirmoy Kar | 103,567 | 54.51 | +4.58 |
| CPI | Makhanlal Nayak | 73,679 | 38.78 | −7.22 |
| BJP | Swapan Kumar Dutta | 10,193 | 5.36 | +2.93 |
| NOTA | None of the above | 1,112 | 0.59 | |
| SUCI(C) | Surjyendu Bikash Patra | 765 | 0.40 | |
| Independent | Subrata Guria | 684 | 0.36 | |
| Turnout | | 190,000 | 88.69 | −4.02 |
| AITC hold | | Swing | | |

=== 2011 ===
West Bengal assembly elections, 2011: Patashpur
| Party | Candidate | Votes | % | ±% |
|---|---|---|---|---|
| AITC | Jyotirmoy Kar | 84,452 | 49.93 | +0.32# |
| CPI | Makhanlal Nayak | 77,802 | 46.00 | −4.39 |
| BJP | Asish Das | 4,104 | 2.43 | |
| Independent | Mohan Rana | 1,113 | | |
| Independent | Prafulla Kumar Kar | 981 | | |
| Independent | Shyamapada Bera | 701 | | |
| Turnout | | 169,153 | 92.71 | |
| AITC gain from CPI | | Swing | 4.71# | |

.# Swing calculated on Congress+Trinamool Congress vote percentages taken together in 2006.

=== 2006 ===
2006 West Bengal Legislative Assembly election: Patashpur
| Party | Candidate | Votes | % | ±% |
|---|---|---|---|---|
| CPI | Kamakhyanandan Dasmahapatra | 72,327 | 50.39 | −0.53 |
| AITC | Kar Tapan Kanti | 65,402 | 45.57 | +1.33 |
| INC | Bhargabendra Nath Jana | 5,808 | 4.05 | |
| Majority | | 6,925 | 4.82 | −1.86 |
| Turnout | | 143,537 | | |
| CPI hold | | Swing | | |

=== 2001 ===
2001 West Bengal Legislative Assembly election: Patashpur
| Party | Candidate | Votes | % | ±% |
|---|---|---|---|---|
| CPI | Kamakhyanandan Dasmahapatra | 69,069 | 50.92 | |
| AITC | Mrinal Kanti Das | 60,011 | 44.24 | |
| BJP | Manindra Nandan Dasmahapatra | 6,561 | 4.84 | |
| Majority | | 9,058 | 6.68 | |
| Turnout | | 135,641 | 88.61 | |
| CPI hold | | Swing | | |

Kamakhya Nandan Das Mohapatra of CPI won the Patashpur assembly seat six times in a row, defeating Tapan Kanti Kar of Trinamool Congress in 2006, Mrinal Kanti Das of Trinamool Congress in 2001, Paresh Chandra Bhunia of Congress in 1996, Sunil Pal of Congress in 1991, Pradyot Kumar Mahanti of Congress in 1987 and Radha Nath Das Adhikary of Congress in 1982. Contests in most years were multi cornered but only winners and runners are being mentioned. Janmejoy Ojha of Janata Party defeated Barendra Nath Patra of Congress in 1977.

=== 1972 ===
Prafulla Maity of Congress won in 1972 and 1971. K.D.Mahapatra (Kamakhya Nandan Das Mahapatra) of CPI won in 1969 and 1967. Radhanath Das Adhikari of Congress won in 1962. Sisir Kumar Das of PSP won in 1957. In independent India's first election in 1951 Janardan Sahu of BJS won the Pataspur assembly seat.
