= Baniapukur Ballygung Assembly constituency =

Former West Bengal Legislative Assembly constituency

Coordinates: 22.54°N 88.37°E

Baniapukur Ballygung
- Former constituency for the West Bengal Legislative Assembly

Constituency details
- Country: India
- Region: East India
- State: West Bengal
- District: Kolkata
- Lok Sabha constituency: Calcutta South East
- Established: 1951
- Abolished: 1957
- Reservation: None

Baniapukur Ballygung Assembly constituency was a Legislative Assembly constituency of Kolkata district in the Indian state of West Bengal.

== Overview ==
Beniapukur and Ballygunge were areas added to the Calcutta Corporation in 1889. Baniapukur Ballygung was the sole two-member assembly seat in Calcutta. One seat was reserved for Scheduled Castes, the other seat was unreserved.

== Results ==
In independent India's first election in 1951, Jogesh Chandra Gupta and Pulin Behari Khatic, both of Indian National Congress, won. Amongst the independent candidates in the fray were Jogendra Nath Mandal, a former Minister of Pakistan, and Dr. A.M.O. Ghani.
