= Anju Kar =

Indian politician

Anju Kar is an Indian politician from West Bengal. She is a former five time consecutive member of the West Bengal Legislative Assembly from Kalna Assembly constituency, which is reserved for Scheduled Caste community, in Purba Bardhaman district. She was first elected in the 1982 West Bengal Legislative Assembly election representing the Communist Party of India (Marxist) and served five terms till 2006. She last won the 2001 West Bengal Legislative Assembly election from Kalna.

== Early life and career ==
Kar is from Kalna, Purba Bardhaman district, West Bengal. She was a politburo member of the Communist Party of India (Marxist). In April 2022, she was also elected as a member of the 85 member Central Committee.

She was first elected as an MLA in the 1982 West Bengal Legislative Assembly election representing the Communist Party of India. She polled 47,829 votes and defeated her nearest rival, Sudhir Ghosh of the Indian National Congress, by a margin of 13,464 votes. She retained the seat for the Communist Party winning the 1987 West Bengal Legislative Assembly election and went on to win three more times in 1991, 1996 and 2001 Assembly elections. In 1987, she polled 59,092 votes and defeated her nearest rival, Dhirendra Nath Chatterjee of the Indian National Congress, by a margin of 22,114 votes. In 1991, she polled 64,560 votes and beat her closest opponent, Dhirendra Nath Chattopadhyay, also of the Congress, by a margin of 26,650 votes.

In 1996, she polled 72,329 votes and defeated her nearest rival, Lakshman Kumar Roy of the Indian National Congress, by a margin of 16,504 votes. In 2001, she got 79,401 votes and beat Banerjee Sridhar of the All India Trinamool Congress, by a margin of 24,953 votes.
