= Nirmal Krishna Sinha =

Nirmal Krishna Sinha was an Indian politician, belonging to the Communist Party of India. He was born in Rampurhat, Birbhum district in 1912, son of Ashutosh Sinha. He studied at the Krishnanath College in Berhampore, and would go on to work as a teacher. He was an active trade unionist at the Bengal Nagpur Railway, and was arrested in 1949 and was jailed for one year at Purulia Jail. After release from jail, he was active in peasants and teachers movements. He was a member of the CPI Birbhum District Committee and served as the president of the Birbhum Zilla Krishak Samity (district unit of the All India Kisan Sabha). He was a member of the Labhpur Anchal Panchayat. Sinha was a frequent contributor to publications such as Kalantar and Kampass.

Sinha won the Labhpur seat in the 1972 West Bengal Legislative Assembly election. Per the official records, Sinha obtained 15,304 votes (50.54%) against 14,976 votes (49.46%) for the Communist Party of India (Marxist) candidate Sunil Majumdar. Sinha lost the Labhpur seat in the 1977 West Bengal Legislative Assembly election, finishing in fourth place with 2,263 votes (6.43%).
