= Nurul Islam Mollah =

West Bengal politician

Member of West Bengal Legislative Assembly
- In office 1972–1977
- Preceded by: Hare Krishna Konar
- Succeeded by: Guruprasad Sinha Roy
- Constituency: Kalna

Personal details
- Born: Kalna, Bardhaman district, Bengal Presidency
- Party: Indian National Congress

Nurul Islam Mollah is an Indian politician belonging to the Indian National Congress. He was the MLA of Kalna Assembly constituency in the West Bengal Legislative Assembly.

== Early life and family ==
Mollah was born into a Bengali family of Muslim Mollahs in Pandua, Bardhaman district, Bengal Presidency.

== Career ==
Mollah contested in the 1971 West Bengal Legislative Assembly election where he ran as an Indian National Congress candidate for Kalna Assembly constituency but was unsuccessful. At the subsequent 1972 West Bengal Legislative Assembly election, he won a seat in Kalna.
