= Yeakub Hossain =

West Bengal politician

Yakub Hossain

Member of West Bengal Legislative Assembly
- In office 1951–1962
- Preceded by: Constituency established
- Succeeded by: Shiromani Prasad
- Constituency: Nalhati

Personal details
- Born: Birbhum district, Bengal Presidency
- Party: Indian National Congress

Mohammad Yakub Hossain was a politician belonging to the Indian National Congress. He served as a member of the West Bengal Legislative Assembly for over a decade.

== Career ==
Hossain contested in the inaugural West Bengal Legislative Assembly election where he ran as an Indian National Congress candidate for Nalhati Assembly constituency, defeating the Hindutva-aligned Akhil Bharatiya Hindu Mahasabha candidate Suresh Chandra Sinha. He contested in the 1957 West Bengal Legislative Assembly election and was re-elected to Nalhati after winning against independent candidate Vishnupada Ghose.
