= Swagata Manna =

Indian politician (born 1985)

Member of the West Bengal Legislative Assembly
- Incumbent
- Assumed office 5 May 2026
- Preceded by: Ajit Maity
- Constituency: Pingla

Personal details
- Party: Bharatiya Janata Party
- Profession: Politician

Swagata Manna (born 1985) is an Indian politician from West Bengal. She is a member of the West Bengal Legislative Assembly from the Pingla Assembly constituency in Paschim Medinipur district representing the Bharatiya Janata Party.

== Early life and education ==
Manna is from Panskura, Paschim Medinipur district, West Bengal. She married Asis Kumar Manna. Both of them work as teachers. She completed her BA in english (Honours) at Haldia Government College which is affiliated with Netaji Subhas Open University, in 2010. Later, she did D.EI.Ed. and passed the examinations conducted by the West Bengal Board of Primary Education in 2011. She declared assets worth Rs.1 crore in her affidavit to the Election Commission of India.

== Career ==
Manna won the Pingla Assembly constituency representing the Bharatiya Janata Party in the 2026 West Bengal Legislative Assembly election. She polled 1,24,189 votes and defeated her nearest rival and sitting MLA, Ajit Maity of the All India Trinamool Congress by a margin of 30,605 votes.
