= Triptimoy Aich =

Indian politician

Triptimoy Aich was an Indian politician, belonging to the Indian National Congress. He was born on 22 August 1942 in Comilla, the son of Sachindra Chandra Aich. He studied at В. В. College in Asansol, and later at the University College of Law, obtaining B.Sc. and LL.B. degrees. He worked as a lawyer and was involved in trade union organising. As of the early 1970 he was the general secretary of the Asansol Block Congress Committee and a member of the Burdwan District Congress Committee. He was elected to the West Bengal Legislative Assembly in the 1972 election from the Hirapur constituency. He obtained 19,068 votes (48.62%).
