= Gajendra Gurung =

Indian politician

Personal details
- Born: 3 January 1937 Kalimpong, West Bengal
- Died: 2005
- Party: Congress (R)

Gajendra Gurung (1937–2005) was an Indian politician. He was born in Kalimpong on 3 January 1937. He was the son of former Congress minister Nar Bahadur Gurung. His uncle had founded the Akhil Bharatiya Gorkha League. Gajendra Gurung studied at Government High School and S.U.M.I. College in Kalimpong.

Gurung won the Kalimpong seat in the 1972 West Bengal Legislative Assembly election, standing as the Congress (R) candidate. He obtained 10,190 votes (37.60%). In the Congress-CPI state government formed after the 1972 election, Gurung served as Deputy Minister for Department of Commerce of Industries, Department of Cottage and Small Scale Industries, Department of Co-operation (named on 15 December 1972), Tourism Branch of the Home Department (named on 20 March 1972) and Hill Affairs Branch of Department of Development and Planning. In 1975 he was named Minister of State. Gurung lost the Kalimpong seat in the 1977 West Bengal Legislative Assembly election, finishing in second place with 9,045 votes (27.61%).

In the 1980s Gurung joined the Pranta Parishad of Madan Tamang, and became part of the leadership of the movement.

Gajendra Gurung died in 2005.
