= Ajit Maity =

Indian politician

Member of the West Bengal Legislative Assembly
- In office 2 May 2021 – 5 May 2026
- Preceded by: Soumen Mahapatra
- Succeeded by: Swagata Manna
- Constituency: Pingla

Personal details
- Party: Trinamool Congress
- Profession: Politician

Ajit Maity is an Indian politician from West Bengal, who won as an MLA in the 2021 West Bengal Legislative Assembly election representing the Pingla constituency. Maity is a member of the Trinamool Congress.

In early 2024, Maity was arrested in Sandeshkhali, North 24 Parganas district, following allegations of land grabbing and extortion. His arrest came shortly after he was removed from his position as the head of the local Trinamool Congress unit.
