= Moinuddin Shams =

West Bengali politician

Member of West Bengal Legislative Assembly
- In office 2016–2021
- Preceded by: Dipak Chatterjee
- Succeeded by: Rajendra Prasad Singh
- Constituency: Nalhati

Personal details
- Born: Birbhum district, Bengal Presidency
- Party: Independent; Trinamool Congress
- Parent: Kalimuddin Shams (father)
- Education: University of Calcutta

Moinuddin Shams was an Indian advocate and politician belonging to the Trinamool Congress. He served as an MLA in the West Bengal Legislative Assembly.

== Early life ==
Shams was born in 1967 to a Bihari Muslim family in Birbhum district, West Bengal. His father, Kalimuddin Shams, was a former MLA of Nalhati, and his grandfather Haji Mojibur Rahman was originally from Simra in Gaya district. Shams graduated with a Master of Arts from the University of Calcutta in 1988.

== Career ==
Shams contested the 2016 West Bengal Legislative Assembly election as a Trinamool Congress candidate for Nalhati Assembly constituency, defeating former MLA and Forward Bloc politician Dipak Chatterjee. He contested the 2021 West Bengal Legislative Assembly election as an independent candidate but was unsuccessful.
