= Golam Mohiuddin =

Indian politician

Member of West Bengal Legislative Assembly
- In office 1967–1977
- Preceded by: Shiromani Prasad
- Succeeded by: Bhabani Prasad Chatterjee
- Constituency: Nalhati

Personal details
- Born: Birbhum district, Bengal Presidency, British India
- Political party: Indian National Congress

Golam Mohiuddin was an Indian independent politician who served as an MLA in the West Bengal Legislative Assembly for a decade.

== Career ==
Mohiuddin contested in the inaugural West Bengal Legislative Assembly election where he ran on an independent ticket for Nalhati Assembly constituency, winning against Congress politician M. A. Raquil. He ran on an obtained 7,664 votes (27.41%). Mohiuddin contested in the 1969 West Bengal Legislative Assembly election and was re-elected to Nalhati after winning against Congress candidate Syed Shah Mainul Hoque. He obtained 16,180 votes (53.73%). Mohiuddin contested in the 1971 West Bengal Legislative Assembly election and was re-elected to Nalhati after winning against independent candidate Mohammad Azaharul Islam. He obtained 10,184 votes (39.66%). Mohiuddin contested in the 1972 West Bengal Legislative Assembly election and was re-elected to Nalhati after winning against Congress candidate Syed Shah Nawaz. He obtained 12,932 votes (46.11%). He didn't contest the 1977 West Bengal Legislative Assembly election.
