= Ghiasuddin Ahmad =

Indian politician

Ghiasuddin Ahmad (Bengali: গিয়াছুদ্দীন আহমদ; born 1 January 1927) was an Indian politician.

== Early life and education ==
Ahmad was born on 1 January 1927 to a Bengali family of Muslims in Kalinagar, Nadia district, Bengal Presidency. He was the son of Mohammad Samad Ali. He studied at Krishnanagar Government College and Union Christian Training College, obtaining Bachelor of Arts (Hons.) and B.T. degrees.

== Career ==
Ahmad worked as school teacher. He served as secretary of the Nadia District Congress Committee.

He won the Chapra seat in the 1972 West Bengal Legislative Assembly election, standing as the Congress (R) candidate. He obtained 27,514 votes (60.37%). He lost the Chapra seat in the 1977 West Bengal Legislative Assembly election, finishing in third place with 8,035 votes (14.63%).
