= Nalhati Assembly constituency =

Vidhan Sabha constituency in West Bengal, India

Nalhati
- Constituency No. 293 for the West Bengal Legislative Assembly
- Interactive Map Outlining Nalhati Assembly Constituency

Constituency details
- Country: India
- Region: East India
- State: West Bengal
- District: Birbhum
- Lok Sabha constituency: Birbhum
- Established: 1951
- Total electors: 176,536
- Reservation: None

Member of Legislative Assembly
- 18th West Bengal Legislative Assembly
- Incumbent Rajendra Prasad Singh
- Party: Democratic Trinamool Congress
- Elected year: 2026

Nalhati Assembly constituency is an assembly constituency in Birbhum district in the Indian state of West Bengal.

== Overview ==
As per orders of the Delimitation Commission, No. 293 Nalhati Assembly constituency is composed of the following: Nalhati I CD Block, and Kushmore I, Kushmore II and Rudranagar gram panchayats of Murarai II CD Block.

Nalhati Assembly constituency is part of No. 42 Birbhum (Lok Sabha constituency).

== Members of the Legislative Assembly ==
Year	Name	Party
1951	Mohammad Yeakub Hossain	Indian National Congress
1957	Mohammad Yeakub Hossain	Indian National Congress
1957	Sisir Kumar Saha	Indian National Congress
1962	Shiromani Prasad	Indian National Congress
1967	Golam Mohiuddin	Independent politician
1969	Golam Mohiuddin	Independent politician
1971	Golam Mohiuddin	Independent politician
1972	Golam Mohiuddin	Independent politician
1977	Bhabani Prasad Chattopadhyay	All India Forward Bloc
1982	Sachidanandan Sau	All India Forward Bloc
1987	Brindaban Saha	All India Forward Bloc
1991	Sattick Kumar Roy	All India Forward Bloc
1996	Kalimuddin Shams	All India Forward Bloc
2001	Kalimuddin Shams	All India Forward Bloc
2006	Dipak Chatterjee	All India Forward Bloc
2011	Abhijit Mukherjee	Indian National Congress
2013^	Dipak Chatterjee	All India Forward Bloc
2016	Moinuddin Shams	Trinamool Congress
2021	Rajendra Prasad Singh	Trinamool Congress
2026	Rajendra Prasad Singh	Trinamool Congress

- ^ by-election

== Election results ==
=== 2026 ===
2026 West Bengal Legislative Assembly election: Nalhati
Party	Candidate	Votes	%	±%
AITC	Rajendra Prasad Singh	87,744	39.43	▼17.11
BJP	Anil Kumar Singh	74,298	33.39	▲4.24
INC	Abdul Karim	44,991	20.22	
AIMIM	Ansar Sekh	7,367	3.31	
AIFB	Dipak Chatterjee	4,415	1.98	▼8.29
NOTA	None of the above	1,533	0.69	▼0.22
Majority		13,446	6.04	▼21.35
Turnout		222,519	95.89	▲11.06
AITC hold		Swing		

=== 2021 ===
In the 2021 elections, Rajendra Prasad Singh of Trinamool Congress defeated his nearest rival, Tapas Kumar Yadav of BJP.

West Bengal assembly elections, 2021: Nalhati
Party	Candidate	Votes	%	±%
AITC	Rajendra Prasad Singh	117,438	56.54	
BJP	Tapas Kumar Yadav	60,533	29.15	
AIFB	Dipak Chatterjee	21,328	10.27	
NOTA	None of the above	1,900	0.91	
Majority		56,905	27.39	
Turnout		207,696	84.83	
AITC hold		Swing		

=== 2016 ===
In the 2016 elections, Moinuddin Shams of Trinamool Congress defeated his nearest rival, Dipak Chatterjee of AIFB.

West Bengal assembly elections, 2016: Nalhati
Party	Candidate	Votes	%	±%
AITC	Moinuddin Shams	83,412	45.33	+17.28
AIFB	Dipak Chatterjee	73,084	39.71	+6.72
BJP	Anil Singh	19,046	10.35	+3.07
BSP	Dinabandhu Mondal	4,053	2.20	
SUCI(C)	Abdus Salam	1,885	1.02	
NOTA	None of the above	1,563	0.85	
Independent	Sukanta Ghosh	979	0.53	
Turnout		184,022	84.92	−0.84
AITC gain from AIFB		Swing		

=== 2013 bypoll ===
The 2013 by-election was necessitated by the election of the sitting MLA Abhijit Mukherjee to the Lok Sabha from Jangipur (Lok Sabha constituency).

By-election, 2013: Nalhati
Party	Candidate	Votes	%	±%
AIFB	Dipak Chatterjee	55,341	32.99	−5.96
INC	Abdur Rahaman	47,595	28.38	−20.27
AITC	Biplab Kumar Ojha	47,041	28.05	+28.05
BJP	Anil Singh	12,219	7.28	+0.46
AIUDF	Md. Noorul Hoda	1,953	1.16	
Independent	Dhananjoy Bandopadhyay	1,368		
JP	Nurul Islam	1,227		
Independent	Kaosar Sekh	957		
Majority		7,746	4.61	
Turnout		167,701	85.76	
AIFB gain from INC		Swing		

=== 2011 ===
In the 2011 elections, Abhijit Mukherjee (son of Pranab Mukherjee) of Congress defeated his nearest rival Dipak Chatterjee of AIFB.

West Bengal assembly elections, 2011: Nalhati
Party	Candidate	Votes	%	±%
INC	Abhijit Mukherjee	76,047	48.65	+3.22#
AIFB	Dipak Chatterjee	60,887	38.95	−11.49
BJP	Anil Singh	10,656	6.82	
BSP	Bikash Mondal	2,717	1.74	
Independent	Rudra Deb Ghosh	1,516		
Independent	Ajrail Md.	1,258		
SUCI	Rafiqul Hasan	1,123		
Independent	Prabhat Kumar Mondal	912		
Turnout		156,329	88.55	
INC gain from AIFB		Swing	+14.71#	

.# Swing calculated on Congress+Trinamool Congress vote percentages taken together in 2006.

=== 2006 ===
In the 2006 assembly state assembly elections, Dipak Chatterjee of Forward Bloc won the Nalhati assembly seat defeating his nearest rival Abdul Walee Mollah of Congress. Contests in most years were multi cornered but only winners and runners are being mentioned. In 2001 and 1996 Kalimuddin Shams of Forward Bloc defeated Sharif Hossain of Congress. Sattick Kumar Roy of Forward Bloc defeated Madan Mohan Mandal of BJP in 1991, Brindaban Saha of Congress in 1987 and Sachidanandan Sau of Congress in 1982. Bhabani Prasad Chattopadhyay of Forward Bloc defeated Abhoy Charan Das of Congress in 1977.

=== 1972 ===
Golam Mohiuddin, Independent, won in 1972, 1971, 1969 and 1967. Shiromani Prasad of Congress won in 1962. In 1957 Nalhati was a joint seat. Mohammad Yeakub Hossain and Sisir Kumar Saha, both of Congress, won from Nalhati. In independent India's first election in 1951 Mohammad Yeakub Hossain of Congress won.
