= Bijoy Das (West Bengal politician) =

Indian politician

Bijoy Das was an Indian politician from West Bengal, belonging to the Indian National Congress. He represented the Pingla seat in the West Bengal Legislative Assembly from 1971 to 1977.

Das was born in Jalchak in Midnapur District on January 1, 1928. He was the son of Gunadhar Das. He went to school at Moyna Purnananda Vidyapith. Das was later educated at Midnapore College and University of Calcutta, obtaining M.A. and B.T. degrees. Das was a teacher by profession, and a member of the Wes Bengal Headmasters Association. He was married to Prabhabati, the couple had four sons and two daughters.

As a local Indian National Congress politician, Das served as the upapradhan of the Jalchak Anchal Panchayat. The Indian National Congress fielded Das as its candidate for the Pingla seat in the 1969 West Bengal Legislative Assembly election. Das finished in second place with 25,225 votes (45.09%). He won the Pingla seat in the 1971 West Bengal Legislative Assembly election, obtaining 24,892 votes (45.93%). He retained the Pingla seat in the 1972 West Bengal Legislative Assembly election, obtaining 29,460 votes (58.62%). Das lost the Pingla seat in the 1977 West Bengal Legislative Assembly election, finishing in second place with 13,030 votes (28.88%).
