= Kalimuddin Shams =

Indian politician

Member of West Bengal Legislative Assembly
- In office 1996–2006
- Preceded by: Sattick Kumar Roy
- Succeeded by: Dipak Chattopadhyay
- Constituency: Nalhati

Minister for Agriculture Marketing, Food and Supply Government of West Bengal
- In office 1991–2004

Deputy Speaker of the West Bengal Legislative Assembly
- In office 1977–1987
- Preceded by: Haridas Mitra
- Succeeded by: Anil Kumar Mukherjee

Member of West Bengal Legislative Assembly
- In office 1969-1971, 1977-1987, 1991 – 1996
- Constituency: Kabitirtha

MMIC of Water Department, Kolkata Municipal Corporation
- In office 1965–1972

Personal details
- Born: 13 February 1939 Gaya, Bihar, British India
- Died: 4 March 2013 (aged 74)
- Party: All India Forward Bloc
- Education: University of Calcutta
- Profession: Politician, social worker

Kalimuddin Shams (13 February 1939 – 4 March 2013) was an Indian politician, belonging to the All India Forward Bloc. He served in Government of West Bengal as Minister for Agriculture Marketing, Food and Supply (1991–2005).

== Early life and family ==
Shams was born on 13 February 1939 to a Bihari Muslim family in the village of Simra in Gaya, Bihar. He was the son of Haji Mojibur Rahman and the father of former MLA Moinuddin Shams.

== Career ==
A lawyer by profession, Shams became involved in organising local struggles of residents of Kidderpore outside Calcutta. He was elected to the Calcutta Municipal Corporation in 1965, standing as an independent candidate. In the following year he became a member of the All India Forward Bloc.

Shams stood as a Forward Bloc candidate in the Kabitirtha seat in the 1967 legislative assembly election, but was not elected. In 1969 he again contested municipal elections and was re-elected. He served as Mayor in Council for Water Department. In the 1972 election he again ran for legislative assembly from Kabitirtha, but was not elected.

Shams was elected to the West Bengal legislative assembly in the 1977 elections, representing Kabitirtha. He was elected as the Deputy Speaker of the assembly. He would be re-elected in 1982, 1987, 1992, 1996 and 2001 (albeit in the two last elections he represented the Nalhati constituency).

In 1980 the Urdu Academy of West Bengal was founded, with Shams as its chairman. He also served as president of the Mohammedan Sports Club for several years, being appointed in 1992.

Shams was a member of the Central Committee of the All India Forward Bloc for 15 years. He resigned from his ministerial post in 2005 due to ill health. An excellent orator, Shams was popular in India as a Muslim leader, who didn't hesitate to speak his mind and there were instances when he didn't even toe his party line when the issue concerned his community.

Kalimuddin Shams is linked to killing of IPS Vinod Kumar Mehta, DCP (Port) on March 18, 1984.
