= Pingla Assembly constituency =

Pingla
- Constituency No. 227 for the West Bengal Legislative Assembly
- Interactive Map Outlining Pingla Assembly Constituency

Constituency details
- Country: India
- Region: East India
- State: West Bengal
- District: Paschim Medinipur
- Lok Sabha constituency: Ghatal
- Established: 1967
- Total electors: 194,757
- Reservation: None

Member of Legislative Assembly
- 18th West Bengal Legislative Assembly
- Incumbent Swagata Manna
- Party: BJP
- Elected year: 2026
- Preceded by: Ajit Maity

Pingla Assembly constituency is an assembly constituency in Paschim Medinipur district in the Indian state of West Bengal.

== Overview ==
As per orders of the Delimitation Commission, No. 227 Pingla Assembly constituency is composed of the following: Dhaneswarpur, Gobordhanpur, Jamna, Karkai, Kshirai, Kusumda and Pindurui gram panchayats of Pingla community development block (CDB) and Kharagpur II CDB.

Pingla Assembly constituency is part of No. 32 Ghatal (Lok Sabha constituency). It was earlier part of Panskura (Lok Sabha constituency).

== Members of the Legislative Assembly ==
Year	Name	Party
1967	Gouranga Samanta	Communist Party of India
1969	Gouranga Samanta	Communist Party of India
1971	Bijoy Das	Indian National Congress
1972	Bijoy Das	Indian National Congress
1977	Haripada Jana	Janata Party
1982	Haripada Jana	Independent politician
1987	Haripada Jana	Independent politician
1991	Haripada Jana	Democratic Socialist Party (Prabodh Chandra)
1996	Ramapada Samanta	Communist Party of India
2001	Ramapada Samanta	Independent politician
2006	Ramapada Samanta	Democratic Socialist Party (Prabodh Chandra)
2011	Prabodh Chandra Sinha	Democratic Socialist Party (Prabodh Chandra)
2016	Saumen Kumar Mahapatra	Trinamool Congress
2021	Ajit Maity	Trinamool Congress
2026	Swagata Manna	Bharatiya Janata Party

== Election results ==
=== 2026 ===
2026 West Bengal Legislative Assembly election: Pingla
Party	Candidate	Votes	%	±%
BJP	Swagata Manna	124,189	51.16	▲4.9
AITC	Ajit Maity	105,709	43.55	▼5.62
CPI	Ashok Sen	6,423	2.65	
NOTA	None of the above	2,173	0.9	▼0.01
Majority		18,480	7.61	▲4.7
Turnout		242,754	94.74	▲5.08
BJP gain from AITC		Swing		

=== 2021 ===
2021 West Bengal Legislative Assembly election: Pingla
Party	Candidate	Votes	%	±%
AITC	Ajit Maity	112,435	49.17	
BJP	Antara Bhattacharya	105,779	46.26	▲38.16
INC	Samir Roy	7,103	3.11	
NOTA	None of the above	2,073	0.91	
Majority		6,656	2.91	
Turnout		228,669	89.66	
AITC hold		Swing		

=== 2016 ===
West Bengal assembly elections, 2016: Pingla
Party	Candidate	Votes	%	±%
AITC	Saumen Kumar Mahapatra	104,416	50.90	▲4.34
DSP(PC)	Prabodh Chandra Sinha	80,198	39.10	▼8.14
BJP	Antara Bhattacharya	16,665	8.10	▲3.84
SUCI(C)	Ranjit Bankura	2,388	1.20	
NOTA	None of the above	2,118	1.02	
Independent	Kartik Chandra Dolai	1,474	0.70	
Majority		24,218	11.80	
Turnout		205,141	90.50	▼1.60
AITC gain from DSP(PC)		Swing		

.# Swing calculated on Congress+Trinamool Congress vote percentages taken together in 2006.

=== 2011 ===
West Bengal assembly elections, 2011: Pingla
Party	Candidate	Votes	%	±%
DSP(PC)	Prabodh Chandra Sinha	84,737	47.24	−9.81
AITC	Ajit Maity	83,504	46.56	+3.62
BJP	Sambhunath Hansda	7,641	4.26	
JMM	Rabi Tudu	3,481	1.94	
Majority		1,233	0.69	
Turnout		179,364	92.10	
DSP(PC) hold		Swing	-13.43#	

.# Swing calculated on Congress+Trinamool Congress vote percentages taken together in 2006.

=== 2006 ===
In the 2006 state assembly elections, Ramapada Samanta of DSP(PC) won the Pingla assembly seat defeating Hrishikesh Dinda of Trinamool Congress. Contests in most years were among multiple candidates but only winners and runners-up are being mentioned. Rampada Samanta, Independent, defeated Raj Kumar Das of Trinamool Congress in 2001. Ramapada Samanta contesting on the CPI(M) symbol defeated Swapan Dome of Congress in 1996. Haripada Jana representing DSP(PC) defeated Saktipada Mahapatra of Congress in 1991, contesting as an independent defeated Sukumar Das of Congress in 1987 and 1982, and representing Janata Party defeated Bijoy Das of Congress in 1977.

=== 1972 ===
Bijoy Das of Congress won in 1972 and 1971. Gouranga Samanta of CPI won in 1969 and 1967.
