= Tapan Maity (politician) =

Indian politician (born 1974)

Tapan Maity (born 18 April, 1974) is an Indian politician from West Bengal. He is a member of the West Bengal Legislative Assembly from the Patashpur Assembly constituency in Purba Medinipur district representing the Bharatiya Janata Party.

== Early life and education ==
Maity is from Ramnagar, Purba Medinipur district, West Bengal. He is the son of Basanta Maity. He completed his graduation in arts from a college affiliated with Acharya Nagarjuna University in 2011. He runs his own business. He declared assets worth Rs.5 crore in his affidavit filed with the Election Commission of India.

== Career ==
Maity won the Patashpur Assembly constituency representing the Bharatiya Janata Party in the 2021 West Bengal Legislative Assembly election. He polled 1,16,589 votes and defeated his nearest rival, Pijush Kanti Panda of the All India Trinamool Congress, by a margin of 9,051 votes.
