= Kalna Assembly constituency =

Kalna
- Constituency No. 264 for the West Bengal Legislative Assembly
- Interactive Map Outlining Kalna Assembly Constituency

Constituency details
- Country: India
- Region: East India
- State: West Bengal
- District: Purba Bardhaman
- Lok Sabha constituency: Bardhaman Purba
- Established: 1951
- Total electors: 187,158
- Reservation: SC

Member of Legislative Assembly
- 18th West Bengal Legislative Assembly
- Incumbent Siddhartha Majumdar
- Party: BJP
- Alliance: NDA
- Elected year: 2026

Kalna Assembly constituency is an assembly constituency in Purba Bardhaman district in the Indian state of West Bengal. It is reserved for scheduled castes.

== Overview ==
As per orders of the Delimitation Commission, No. 264 Kalna (SC) assembly constituency covers Kalna municipality, Kalna II community development block and Bagnapara, Hatkalna and Krishnadevpur gram panchayats of Kalna I community development block.

As per orders of Delimitation Commission it is part of No. 38 Bardhaman Purba Lok Sabha constituency from 2009. Kalna (SC) assembly segment was part of Katwa Lok Sabha constituency prior to 2009.

== Members of the Legislative Assembly ==
Year	Member	Party
1951	Baidyanath Sanyal	Indian National Congress
1951	Rash Behari Sen	Indian National Congress
1957	Hare Krishna Konar	Communist Party of India
1957	Jamadar Majhi	Communist Party of India
1962	Hare Krishna Konar	Communist Party of India
1967	Hare Krishna Konar	Communist Party of India (Marxist)
1969	Hare Krishna Konar	Communist Party of India (Marxist)
1971	Hare Krishna Konar	Communist Party of India (Marxist)
1972	Nurul Islam Mollah	Indian National Congress
1977	Guruprasad Sinha Roy	Communist Party of India (Marxist)
1982	Anju Kar	Communist Party of India (Marxist)
1987	Anju Kar	Communist Party of India (Marxist)
1991	Anju Kar	Communist Party of India (Marxist)
1996	Anju Kar	Communist Party of India (Marxist)
2001	Anju Kar	Communist Party of India (Marxist)
2006	Anjali Mondal	Communist Party of India (Marxist)
2011	Biswajit Kundu	Trinamool Congress
2016	Biswajit Kundu	Trinamool Congress
2021	Deboprasad Bag	Trinamool Congress
2026	Siddhartha Majumdar	Bharatiya Janata Party

== Election results ==
=== 2026 ===
2026 West Bengal Legislative Assembly election: Kalna
Party	Candidate	Votes	%	±%
BJP	Siddhartha Majumdar	110,790	51.96	▲9.56
AITC	Deboprasad Bag	82,160	38.53	▼7.45
CPI(M)	Sharmistha Nag Saha	13,784	6.46	▼2.64
INC	Amal Kumar Saha	2,563	1.2	
NOTA	None of the above	1,333	0.63	▼0.57
Majority		28,630	13.43	▲9.85
Turnout		213,233	94.11	▲7.58
BJP gain from AITC		Swing		

=== 2021 ===
2021 West Bengal Legislative Assembly election: Kalna
Party	Candidate	Votes	%	±%
AITC	Deboprasad Bag	96,073	45.98	▼4.34
BJP	Biswajit Kundu	88,595	42.4	▲33.32
CPI(M)	Nirab Khan	19,005	9.1	▼28.17
BSP	Radheshyam Mandal	2,084	1.0	▼0.02
NOTA	None of the above	2,507	1.2	
Majority		7,478	3.58	
Turnout		208,951	86.53	
AITC hold		Swing		

=== 2016 ===
2016 West Bengal Legislative Assembly election: Kalna
Party	Candidate	Votes	%	±%
AITC	Biswajit Kundu	97,430	50.32	▲0.34
CPI(M)	Sukul Chandra Sikdar	72,169	37.27	▼5.29
BJP	Newton Majumdar	17,577	9.08	▲5.54
NOTA	None of the above	2,865	1.48	New entry
BSP	Radheshyam Mandal	1,976	1.02	▲0.18
CPI(ML)L	Pejush Kumar Sahana	1,612	0.83	▼0.14
Majority		25,261	13.05	▲5.63
Turnout		1,93,629	88.00	▼2.69
AITC hold		Swing		

=== 2011 ===
2011 West Bengal Legislative Assembly election: Kalna
Party	Candidate	Votes	%	±%
AITC	Biswajit Kundu	85,096	49.98	
CPI(M)	Sukul Chandra Sikdar	72,459	42.56	
BJP	Dilip Mondal	6,021	3.54	
Independent	Tapas Das	2,053	1.21	
CPI(ML)L	Pejush Kumar Sahana	1,647	0.97	
PDS	Shibu Halder	1,557	0.91	
BSP	Radheshyam Mandal	1,437	0.84	
Majority		12,637	7.42	
Turnout		1,70,270	90.69	
AITC gain from CPI(M)		Swing		

=== 2006 ===
2006 West Bengal Legislative Assembly election: Kalna
Party	Candidate	Votes	%	±%
CPI(M)	Anjali Mondal	90,046	59.74	
AITC	Asis Chakraborty	42,999	28.53	
INC	Lakshman Kumar Roy	15,665	10.39	
BSP	Rabindra Nath Halder	2,027	1.34	
Majority		47,047	31.21	
Turnout				
CPI(M) hold		Swing		

=== 2001 ===
2001 West Bengal Legislative Assembly election: Kalna
Party	Candidate	Votes	%	±%
CPI(M)	Anju Kar	79,401	54.29	
AITC	Sridhar Banerjee	54,448	37.23	
BJP	Shankar Halder	8,135	5.56	
PDS	Hemanta Mukherjee	2,932	2.00	
CPI(ML)L	Jagannath Mondal	1,349	0.92	
Majority		24,953	17.06	
Turnout		146,359	87.48	
CPI(M) hold		Swing		

=== 1996 ===
1996 West Bengal Legislative Assembly election: Kalna
Party	Candidate	Votes	%	±%
CPI(M)	Anju Kar	72,329	52.40	
INC	Lakshman Kumar Roy	55,825	40.44	
BJP	Biswanath Ghosh	6,400	4.64	
JMM	Baidyanath Murmu	2,201	1.59	
CPI(ML)L	Jagannath Mondal	729	0.53	
Independent	Rabindranath Haldar	225	0.16	
Independent	Ranu Goldar	167	0.12	
Independent	Sukanta Pal	163	0.12	
Majority		16,504	11.96	
Turnout		140,100	88.57	
CPI(M) hold		Swing		

=== 1991 ===
1991 West Bengal Legislative Assembly election: Kalna
Party	Candidate	Votes	%	±%
CPI(M)	Anju Kar	64,560	54.43	
INC	Dhirendra Nath Chattopadhayay	37,910	31.96	
BJP	Debasish Bhattacharaya	13,941	11.75	
JMM	Soren Madhu	1,337	1.13	
BSP	Ranu Goldar	872	0.74	
Majority		26,650	22.47	
Turnout		120,489	83.76	
CPI(M) hold		Swing		

=== 1987 ===
1987 West Bengal Legislative Assembly election: Kalna
Party	Candidate	Votes	%	±%
CPI(M)	Anju Kar	59,092	60.32	
INC	Dhirendra Nath Chatterjee	36,978	37.75	
Independent	Madhu Soren	1,091	1.11	
Independent	Subodh Naskar	619	0.63	
Independent	Ajoy Kumar Ghosh	177	0.18	
Majority		22,114	22.57	
Turnout		99,397	82.15	
CPI(M) hold		Swing		

=== 1982 ===
1982 West Bengal Legislative Assembly election: Kalna
Party	Candidate	Votes	%	±%
CPI(M)	Anju Kar	47,829	56.77	
INC	Sudhir Ghosh	34,365	40.79	
Independent	Gopal Garai	2,060	2.44	
Majority		13,464	15.98	
Turnout		85,798	82.53	
CPI(M) hold		Swing		

=== 1977 ===
1977 West Bengal Legislative Assembly election: Kalna
Party	Candidate	Votes	%	±%
CPI(M)	Guruprasad Sinha Roy	31,826	56.06	
JP	Debendra Bejoy Ghosh	13,074	23.03	
INC	Nurul Islam	11,868	20.91	
Majority		18,752	33.03	
Turnout		57,621	64.49	
Swing to CPI(M) from INC		Swing		

=== 1972 ===
1972 West Bengal Legislative Assembly election: Kalna
Party	Candidate	Votes	%	±%
INC	Nubul Islam Molia	62,476	97.81	
CPI(M)	Dilip Kumar Dubey	952	1.49	
Independent	Soren Madhu	444	0.70	
Majority		61,524	96.32	
Turnout		64,170	78.25	
Swing to INC from CPI(M)		Swing		

=== 1971 ===
1971 West Bengal Legislative Assembly election: Kalna
Party	Candidate	Votes	%	±%
CPI(M)	Konar Harf Krishna	31,896	54.45	
INC	Nurul Islam Molla	24,930	42.56	
Jharkhand Party	Kanka Murmu	1,754	2.99	
Majority		6,966	11.89	
Turnout		60,709	75.55	
CPI(M) hold		Swing		

=== 1969 ===
1969 West Bengal Legislative Assembly election: Kalna
Party	Candidate	Votes	%	±%
CPI(M)	Hare Krishna Konar	29,384	56.98	
INC	Debendra Bejoy Ghosh	22,188	43.02	
Majority		7,196	13.96	
Turnout		52,559	72.90	
CPI(M) hold		Swing		

=== 1967 ===
1967 West Bengal Legislative Assembly election: Kalna
Party	Candidate	Votes	%	±%
CPI(M)	H. K. Konar	22,128	47.58	
INC	D. B. Ghosh	20,877	44.89	
PSP	N. K. Roy	3,240	6.97	
Independent	K. Das	266	0.57	
Majority		1,251	2.69	
Turnout		48,754	70.18	
Swing to CPI(M) from CPI		Swing		

=== 1962 ===
1962 West Bengal Legislative Assembly election: Kalna
Party	Candidate	Votes	%	±%
CPI	Hare Krishna Konar	23,924	53.36	
INC	Dehendra Bejoy Ghosh	20,222	45.10	
Independent	Suresh Chandra Kumar	690	1.54	
Majority		3,702	8.26	
Turnout		47,188	60.56	
CPI win (new seat)				

=== 1957 ===
1957 WB Legislative Assembly election: Kalna (ST) (Double-member constituency)
Party	Candidate	Votes	%	±%
CPI	Hare Krishna Konar	32,996	25.95	
CPI	Jamadar Majhi	32,043	25.20	
INC	Baidyanath Majhi	26,900	21.16	
INC	Rashbehari Sen	22,084	17.37	
Independent	Anandagopal Kumar	9,568	7.53	
Independent	Kalo Majhi	2,062	1.62	
Independent	Dubraj Majhi	1,492	1.17	
Majority		5,143	4.04	
Turnout		127,145	99.55	

=== 1951 ===
1951 WB Legislative Assembly election: Kalna (Double-member constituency)
Party	Candidate	Votes	%	±%
INC	Baidyanath Santal	21,120	22.49	
INC	Rash Behari Sen	18,390	19.58	
CPI	Jamadar Majhi	18,070	19.24	
KMPP	Ananda Gopal Kumar	17,453	18.58	
ABJS	Krishna Kinkar Nandy	11,092	11.81	
Independent	Hilaram Chattopadhyay	2,364	2.52	
Independent	Kali Krishna Das	1,823	1.94	
Independent	Radha Raman Sen	1,379	1.47	
Independent	Pashu Santal	1,291	1.37	
Independent	Kali Prasanna Chaudhury	931	0.99	
Majority		320	0.34	
Turnout		93,913	88.18	
