= Rajendra Prasad Singh (Birbhum politician) =

Indian politician

Member of the West Bengal Legislative Assembly
- Incumbent
- Assumed office 2021
- Preceded by: Moinuddin Shams
- Constituency: Nalhati

Personal details
- Born: 1973 (age 52–53) Nalhati, Birbhum district, West Bengal
- Party: All India Trinamool Congress (until 2026); Democratic Trinamool Congress (from 2026)

Rajendra Prasad Singh (born 1973), also known as Raju Singh, is an Indian politician from West Bengal. He is a member of the West Bengal Legislative Assembly from Nalhati Assembly constituency in Birbhum district. He won the 2021 West Bengal Legislative Assembly election representing the Democratic Trinamool Congress.

== Early life and education ==
Singh is from Nalhati, Birbhum district, West Bengal. He is the son of Krishnananda Singh. He studied Class 8 at Nalhati Vivekananda Vidyapith and passed the examinations conducted by the West Bengal Board of Secondary Education in 1987. His wife looks after the family business of stone industries.

== Career ==
Singh won from Nalhati Assembly constituency representing All India Trinamool Congress in the 2021 West Bengal Legislative Assembly election. He polled 117,438 votes and defeated his nearest rival, Tapas Kumar Yadav of the Bharatiya Janata Party, by a margin of 56,905 votes.
