= Prafulla Maity =

Indian politician (born 1932)

Prafulla Kumar Maity (born 1 July 1932) was an Indian politician. Maity was born in Belda (Midnapore District), the son of Sambhunath Maity. He was schooled at Belda Gangadhar Academy, Midnapur College, David Hare Training College and obtained M.A. and B.T. degrees from the University of Calcutta. He worked as a headmaster.

Maity joined the Indian National Congress in 1950. He became the Vice-President of the Midnapore Congress District Committee. As of 1960 he served as President of the Midnapor Zilla Khet Majdur Samiti ('Midnapore District Land Workers Association'). He was elected to the West Bengal Legislative Assembly in the 1971 election and the 1972 election from the Patashpur constituency. In 1971 he obtained 22,954 votes (44.34%), defeating candidates from CPI and Congress(O) as well as an independent. In 1972 he obtained 33,844 votes (72.11%) in a straight contest against CPI(M).
