= Soumen Mahapatra =

Indian politician

Cabinet Minister, Government of West Bengal
- In office 20 May 2011 – 10 May 2021
- Governor: M. K. Narayanan; D. Y. Patil (additional charge); Keshari Nath Tripathi; Jagdeep Dhankhar
- Chief Minister: Mamata Banerjee
- Department: Water Resources Investigation & Development (2011-2021); Irrigation and Waterways (2021)
- Preceded by: Nandagopal Bhattacharjee (Water Resources Investigation & Development); Mamata Banerjee (Irrigation and Waterways)
- Succeeded by: Manas Bhunia (Water Resources Investigation & Development)

Member of the West Bengal Legislative Assembly
- In office 2 May 2021 – 4 May 2026 (13 May 2011–19 May 2016)
- Preceded by: Jagannath Mitra (2011); Ashok Dinda (2021)
- Succeeded by: Ashok Dinda (2016); Hare Krishna Bera (2026)
- Constituency: Tamluk
- In office 19 May 2016 – 2 May 2021
- Preceded by: Prabodh Chandra Sinha
- Succeeded by: Ajit Maity
- Constituency: Pingla
- In office 2001–2006
- Preceded by: Chhaya Bera
- Succeeded by: Bula Choudhury
- Constituency: Nandanpur

Personal details
- Born: 6 December 1958 (age 67)
- Party: Trinamool Congress
- Spouse: Sumana Mahapatra
- Children: 2

Soumen Mahapatra is an Indian politician, four-time MLA and former Minister for Irrigation and Waterways and previously served as the Minister for Water Resources Investigation & Development in the Government of West Bengal. He was elected from the Tamluk constituency in 2011 and 2021, Pingla constituency in 2016 and Nandanpur constituency in the 2006 West Bengal assembly election.
