= Bikram Chandra Pradhan =

Indian politician

Bikram Chandra Pradhan (born 1954) is an Indian politician from West Bengal. He is a member of the West Bengal Legislative Assembly from Dantan Assembly constituency in Paschim Medinipur district. He won the 2021 West Bengal Legislative Assembly election representing the All India Trinamool Congress party.

== Early life and education ==
Pradhan is from Dantan, Paschim Medinipur district, West Bengal. He is the son of late Gangadhar Pradhan. He completed his Pre-University course in arts in 1975 at Bhatter College, Dantan which is affiliated with University of Calcutta.

== Career ==
Pradhan won from Dantan Assembly constituency representing the All India Trinamool Congress in the 2021 West Bengal Legislative Assembly election. He polled 94,609 votes and defeated his nearest rival, Saktipada Nayak of the Bharatiya Janata Party, by a margin of 775 votes. He first became an MLA winning the 2016 West Bengal Legislative Assembly election.
