= Naresh Chandra Chaki =

Indian politician

MLA of Ranaghat Dakshin
- In office 1972–1977
- Preceded by: Gour Chandra Kundu
- Succeeded by: Gour Chandra Kundu

MLA of Chakdaha
- In office 2011–2014
- Preceded by: Malay Kumar Samanta
- Succeeded by: Ratna Kar Ghosh

Personal details
- Born: 1934/35
- Died: 24 February 2014
- Party: All India Trinamool Congress

Naresh Chandra Chaki was an Indian politician belonging to All India Trinamool Congress. He was elected as a legislator in West Bengal Legislative Assembly from Ranaghat Dakshin in 1972 and from Chakdaha in 2011. He died of cancer on 24 February 2014 at the age of 79.
