= Forward Seamens Union of India =

Trade union in India

Forward Seamen's Union of India
- Location: India
- Affiliations: Centre of Indian Trade Unions

Forward Seamen's Union of India is a trade union, affiliated to the Centre of Indian Trade Unions, organizing Indian sailors.
