= Hirapur Assembly constituency =

Coordinates: 23°40′01″N 86°55′59″E

Hirapur
- Former constituency No. 259 for the West Bengal Legislative Assembly

Constituency details
- Country: India
- Region: East India
- State: West Bengal
- District: Paschim Bardhaman
- Lok Sabha constituency: Asansol
- Established: 1957
- Abolished: 2011
- Reservation: None

Hirapur Assembly constituency was an assembly constituency in Paschim Bardhaman district in the Indian state of West Bengal.

== Overview ==
Hirapur assembly constituency was part of Asansol (Lok Sabha constituency). The Delimitation Commission abolished Hirapur as an assembly constituency in 2011. The area is now covered under Asansol Dakshin Assembly constituency.

== Election results ==
=== 1977-2006 ===
Amitava Mukhopadhyay of CPI(M) won the Hirapur assembly seat in 2006, defeating his nearest rival Moloy Ghatak of Trinamool Congress. Contests in most years were multi cornered but only winners and runners are being mentioned. In 2001, Moloy Ghatak of Trinamool Congress defeated Dilip Ghosh (Independent). In 1996, Shyamadas Banerjee of Congress defeated Mumtaz Hussein of Janata Dal. In 1991, Mumtaz Hussein of JD defeated Suhrid Basu Mallick of Congress. In 1987, Suhrid Basu Mallick of Congress defeated Bamapada Mukherjee of CPI (M). In 1982, Bamapada Mukherjee of CPI (M) defeated Shibdas Ghatak of Congress. In 1977, Bamapada Mukherjee of CPI (M) defeated Santimoy Aich of Congress.

=== 1957-1972 ===
In 1972, Triptimoy Aich of Congress won the Hirapur seat. In 1971 and 1969, Bamapada Mukherjee of CPI (M) won the seat. In 1967, Shibdas Ghatak of Congress won the seat. In 1962, Dr. Gopika Ranjan Mitra of Congress won the seat. In 1957, Taher Hossain (Independent) won the seat. Prior to that the Burnpur area was part of Asansol assembly constituency.
