= Dantan Assembly constituency =

Dantan
- Constituency No. 219 for the West Bengal Legislative Assembly
- Interactive Map Outlining Dantan Assembly Constituency

Constituency details
- Country: India
- Region: East India
- State: West Bengal
- District: Paschim Medinipur
- Lok Sabha constituency: Medinipur
- Established: 1951
- Total electors: 236,503
- Reservation: None

Member of Legislative Assembly
- 18th West Bengal Legislative Assembly
- Incumbent Ajit Kumar Jana
- Party: BJP
- Alliance: NDA
- Elected year: 2026

Dantan Assembly constituency is an assembly constituency in Paschim Medinipur district in the Indian state of West Bengal.

== Overview ==
As per orders of the Delimitation Commission, No. 219 Dantan Assembly constituency is composed of the following: Dantan II community development block, Mohanpur community development block, and Chak Islampur gram panchayat of Dantan I community development block.

Dantan Assembly constituency is part of No. 34 Medinipur (Lok Sabha constituency).

== Members of the Legislative Assembly ==
Year	Name	Party
1951	Jnanendra Kumar Choudhury	Bharatiya Jana Sangh
1957	Charu Chandra Mahanti	Indian National Congress
1962	Charu Chandra Mahanti	Indian National Congress
1967	Debendra Nath Das	Bangla Congress
1969	Debendra Nath Das	Bangla Congress
1971	Pulin Behari Tripathi	Communist Party of India
1974	Pradyut Kumar Mahanti	Indian National Congress (Organisation)
1977	Pradyut Kumar Mahanti	Janata Party
1982	Kanai Bhowmick	Communist Party of India
1987	Kanai Bhowmick	Communist Party of India
1991	Ranjit Patra	Communist Party of India
1996	Nanda Gopal Bhattacharya	Communist Party of India
2001	Nanda Gopal Bhattacharya	Communist Party of India
2006	Nanda Gopal Bhattacharya	Communist Party of India
2011	Arun Mahapatra	Communist Party of India
2016	Bikram Chandra Pradhan	Trinamool Congress
2021	Bikram Chandra Pradhan	Trinamool Congress
2026	Ajit Kumar Jana	Bharatiya Janata Party

== Election results ==
=== 2026 ===
2026 West Bengal Legislative Assembly election: Dantan
Party	Candidate	Votes	%	±%
BJP	Ajit Kumar Jana	110,259	50.49	+2.67
AITC	Manik Maiti	99,883	45.74	−2.39
CPI	Shyamalkanti Das Pattanayek	3,580	1.64	−1.22
NOTA	None of the above	1,211	0.55	−0.08
Majority		10,376	4.75	+4.44
Turnout		218,374	92.39	+7.8
BJP gain from AITC		Swing		

=== 2021 ===
In the 2021 elections, Bikram Chandra Pradhan of Trinamool Congress defeated his nearest rival Shaktipada Nayak of BJP.

West Bengal assembly elections, 2021: Dantan
Party	Candidate	Votes	%	±%
AITC	Bikram Chandra Pradhan	95,209	48.13	
BJP	Shaktipada Nayak	94,586	47.82	
CPI	Sisir Kumar Patra	5,652	2.86	
NOTA	None of the above	1,250	0.63	
Majority		623	0.31	
Turnout		197,798	84.59	
AITC hold		Swing		

=== 2016 ===
In the 2016 elections, Bikram Chandra Pradhan of Trinamool Congress defeated his nearest rival Sisir Kumar Patra of CPI.

West Bengal assembly elections, 2016: Dantan
Party	Candidate	Votes	%	±%
AITC	Bikram Chandra Pradhan	95,641	53.46	+7.01
CPI	Sisir Kumar Patra	66,381	37.10	−12.25
BJP	Shaktipada Nayak	13,347	7.47	+5.03
SUCI(C)	Balaram Das	1,797	1.00	
NOTA	None of the above	1,741	0.97	
Turnout		178,917	84.54	−4.78
AITC gain from CPI		Swing		

=== 2011 ===
In the 2011 elections, Arun Mahapatra of CPI defeated his nearest rival Saibal Giri of Trinamool Congress.

West Bengal assembly elections, 2011: Dantan
Party	Candidate	Votes	%	±%
CPI	Arun Mahapatra	79,118	49.35	−11.09
AITC	Shaibal Giri	74,468	46.45	+7.10#
BJP	Shailendra Jana	3,909	2.44	
Independent	Mukul Kumar Mishra	1,653		
PDS	Soumen Samanta	1,169		
Turnout		160,317	89.32	
CPI hold		Swing	-18.19#	

.# Swing calculated on Congress+Trinamool Congress vote percentages taken together in 2006.

=== 2006 ===
In the 2006, 2001 and 1996 state assembly elections, Nanda Gopal Bhattacharya of CPI won the Danatan assembly seat, defeating his nearest rivals Bikram Chandra Pradhan of Trinamool Congress in 2006 and 2001, and Sunil Baran Giri of Congress in 1996. Contests in most years were multi cornered but only winners and runners are being mentioned. Ranjit Patra of CPI(M) defeated Panchanan Mahanti of Congress in 1991. Kanai Bhowmick of CPI defeated Dilip Kumar Das of Congress in 1987 and Pradyot Kumar Mahanti of Janata Party in 1982. Pradyot Kumar Mahanti of Janata Party defeated Rabindra Nath Dwibedi of CPI in 1977.

=== 1972 ===
Pradyut Kumar Mahanti of Congress (Organisation) won in 1972. Pulin Behari Tripathi of Congress won in 1971. Debendra Nath Das of Bangla Congress won in 1969 and 1967. Charu Chandra Mahanti of Congress won in 1962 and 1957. In independent India's first election in 1951 Jnanendra Kumar Choudhury of Bharatiya Jana Sangh won the Dantan seat.
