= Deboprasad Bag =

Indian politician

Deboprasad Bag (born 1977), also known as Poltu bag, is an Indian politician from West Bengal. He is a member of the West Bengal Legislative Assembly from Kalna Assembly constituency, which is reserved for Scheduled Caste community, in Purba Bardhaman district. He won the 2021 West Bengal Legislative Assembly election representing the All India Trinamool Congress party.

== Early life and education ==
Bag is from Kalna, Purba Bardhaman district, West Bengal. He is the son of Lal Mohan Bag. He studied Class 10 at Kalna Maharaja High School and passed the Madhyamik examinations conducted by the West Bengal Board of Secondary Education in 1993. He gets income from agriculture, trading and rentals while his wife is a partner in a business firm that runs health diagnostics and a restaurant.

== Career ==
Bag won from Kalna Assembly constituency representing the All India Trinamool Congress in the 2021 West Bengal Legislative Assembly election. He polled 96,073 votes and defeated his nearest rival, Biswajit Kundu of the Bharatiya Janata Party, by a margin of 7,478 votes.
