= Kabitirtha Assembly constituency =

Former Legislative Assembly constituency in West Bengal, India

Kabitirtha
- Former constituency No. 147 for the West Bengal Legislative Assembly

Constituency details
- Country: India
- Region: East India
- State: West Bengal
- District: South 24 Parganas
- Lok Sabha constituency: Jadavpur
- Established: 1967
- Abolished: 2011
- Reservation: None

Kabitirtha Assembly constituency was a Legislative Assembly constituency of South 24 Parganas district in the Indian state of West Bengal.

== Overview ==
As a consequence of the orders of the Delimitation Commission, Kabitirtha Assembly constituency ceases to exist from 2011.

It was part of Jadavpur (Lok Sabha constituency).

== Members of the Legislative Assembly ==
| Election Year | Constituency | Name of M.L.A. | Party affiliation |
|---|---|---|---|
| 1951 | Watgaunge | Kali Mukherjee | Indian National Congress |
| 1957 | Ekbalpore | Narendranath Sen | Indian National Congress |
| 1962 | | Narendranath Sen | Indian National Congress |
| 1967 | Kabitirtha | B.B.Paul | Indian National Congress |
| 1969 | | Kalimuddin Shams | All India Forward Bloc |
| 1971 | | Ram Peary Ram | Indian National Congress |
| 1972 | | Ram Peary Ram | Indian National Congress |
| 1977 | | Kalimuddin Shams | All India Forward Bloc |
| 1982 | | Kalimuddin Shams | All India Forward Bloc |
| 1987 | | Ram Pyare Ram | Indian National Congress |
| 1991 | | Kalimuddin Shams | All India Forward Bloc |
| 1996 | | Ram Peary Ram | Indian National Congress |
| 2001 | | Ram Peary Ram | Indian National Congress |
| 2006 | | Ram Peary Ram | Indian National Congress |

== Election results ==
=== 1977-2006 ===
In the 2006, 2001 and 1996 state assembly elections, Ram Pyare Ram of Congress won the 147 Kabitirtha assembly seat defeating his nearest rival Moinuddin Shams of Forward Bloc in all the three years. Kalimuddin Shams of Forward Bloc defeated Ram Pyare Ram of Congress in 1991. Ram Pyare Ram of Congress defeated Kalimuddin Shams of Forward Bloc in 1987. Kalimuddin Shams of Forward Bloc defeated Saugata Roy of ICS in 1982 and Ram Pyare Ram of Congress in 1977.

=== 1967-1972 ===
Ram Peary Ram of Congress won in 1972 and 1971, Kalimuddin Shams of Forward Bloc won in 1969. B.B.Paul of Congress won in 1967.

=== 1951-1962 Ekbalpore-Watgunge ===
In 1962 and 1957, there was a seat at Ekbalpore. Narendra Nath Sen of Congress won in both the years. In independent India’s first election in 1951 Kali Mukherjee of Congress won the Watgunge seat.
