= Mohammed Nizamuddin =

Indian trade unionist and politician

Mohammed Nizamuddin (died 2016) was an Indian trade unionist and politician, belonging to the Communist Party of India (Marxist). Mohammed Nizamuddin won the Entally constituency seat of the West Bengal Legislative Assembly in the 1971, 1977, 1982 and 1991 elections. He served as general secretary of the All India Beedi Workers Federation and was a member of the All India Working Committee of the Centre of Indian Trade Unions. He died in Kolkata on 21 June 2016, at the age of 83.
