= Bara, North 24 Parganas =

Bara
- Census Town
- Location in West Bengal, India Bara (India)
- Coordinates: 22.915231°N 88.772246°E
- Country: India
- State: West Bengal
- District: North 24 Parganas

Area
  - Total: 1.736 km^{2} (0.670 sq mi)
- Elevation: 10 m (33 ft)

Population (2011)
  - Total: 5,172
  - Density: 2,979/km^{2} (7,716/sq mi)

Languages
  - Official: Bengali, English
- Time zone: UTC+5:30 (IST)
- PIN: 743289
- Telephone code: 03216
- Vehicle registration: WB
- Lok Sabha constituency: Bangaon
- Vidhan Sabha constituency: Bangaon Dakshin

Bara is a census town in the Gaighata CD block in the Bangaon subdivision of North 24 Parganas district in the state of West Bengal, India.

== Geography ==
Cities, towns and locations in Bangaon subdivision, North 24 Parganas district
M: municipal town, CT: census town, R: rural/ urban centre, T: place of tourist interest
Owing to space constraints in the small map, the actual locations in a larger map may vary slightly

Bangaon subdivision has 6 police stations including 1 women PS, 3 Community development blocks, 3 panchayat samitis, 38 gram panchayats, 363 mouzas, 355 inhabited villages, 1 municipality and 7 census towns. The municipality is at Bangaon. The census towns are: Chandpara, Chhekati, Sonatikiri, Dhakuria, Chikanpara, Shimulpur and Bara. The subdivision has its headquarters at Bangaon.

=== Location ===
Bara is located at 22.915231°N 88.786246°E.

=== Area overview ===
The area shown in the map was a part of Jessore district from 1883. At the time of Partition of Bengal (1947) the Radcliffe Line placed the police station areas of Bangaon and Gaighata of Jessore district in India and the area was made a part of 24 Parganas district. The renowned novelist, Bibhutibhushan Bandopadhyay (of Pather Panchali fame) belonged to this area and many of his writings portray his experience in the area. It is a flat plain located in the lower Ganges Delta. In the densely populated area, 16.33% of the population lives in the urban areas and 83.67% lives in the rural areas.

Note: The map alongside presents some of the notable locations in the subdivision. All places marked in the map are linked in the larger full screen map.

== Demographics ==
According to the 2011 Census of India, Bara had a total population of 5,172, of which 2,643 (51%) were males and 2,529 (49%) were females. Population in the age range 0–6 years was 446. The total number of literate persons in Bara was 4,087 (86.48% of the population over 6 years).

== Infrastructure ==
According to the District Census Handbook, North Twenty Four Parganas, 2011, Bara covered an area of 1.736 km^{2}. It had 4 km roads. The protected water-supply involved hand pumps. It had 3,654 domestic electric connections. Among the medical facilities it had 1 TB hospital, 1 medicine shop. Among the educational facilities, it had 2 primary schools, 1 middle school, 1 secondary school and 1 higher secondary school. The nearest college was 5 km away at Thakurnagar.
