= Dharmmapukuria =

Dharmmapukuria Dharam Pukuria
- Village
- Location in West Bengal, India Dharmmapukuria (India)
- Coordinates: 23°6′24″N 88°49′13″E
- Country: India
- State: West Bengal
- District: North 24 Parganas

Population (2011)
  - Total: 2,776

Languages
  - Official: Bengali, English
- Time zone: UTC+5:30 (IST)
- PIN: 743235 (Dharmmapukuria)
- Telephone/STD code: 03215
- Lok Sabha constituency: Bangaon
- Vidhan Sabha constituency: Bangaon Uttar
- Website: north24parganas.nic.in

Dharmmapukuria (also known as Dharam Pukuria) is a village and a gram panchayat in Bangaon CD Block in Bangaon subdivision of North 24 Parganas district in the state of West Bengal, India.

== Demographics ==
According to the 2011 Census of India, Dharmmapukuria had a total population of 2,776, of which 1,416 were males and 1,360 were females.

== Education ==
Dharmmapukuria gram panchayat schools list shown and counted by election commission are as follows:-

- Chanda Lalit Mohan High School
- Ramchandrapur High School
- Manigram High school
