= Manikhira =

- Village
- Location in West Bengal, India#India
- Coordinates: 22.931231°N 88.804246°E
- Country: India
- State: West Bengal
- District: North 24 Parganas

Area
  - Total: 2.16 km^{2} (0.83 sq mi)

Population (2011)
  - Total: 2,898
  - Density: 1,340/km^{2} (3,470/sq mi)

Languages
  - Official: Bengali, English
- Time zone: UTC+5:30 (IST)
- PIN: 743249 (Manikhira)
- Telephone/STD code: 03215
- Lok Sabha constituency: Bangaon
- Vidhan Sabha constituency: Gaighata
- Website: north24parganas.nic.in

Manikhira is a village in Gaighata CD Block in Bangaon subdivision of the North Twenty Four Parganas district in the state of West Bengal, India.

== Geography ==
It is situated 9.1 km away from CD Block/ sub-district headquarters Gaighata and 42.8 km away from district headquarters Barasat.

== Demographics ==
As per the 2011 Census of India, Manikhira had a total population of 2,898, of which 1,474 (51%) were males and 1,424 (49%) were females. Population below 6 years was 238. The total number of literates in Manikhara was 2,111 (79.36% of the population over 6 years).

== Transport ==
It is on the Thakurnagar-Ramchandrapur Road, which links Manikhira to NH 112 (Jessore Road). The nearest railway station is at Thakurnagar.

== Healthcare ==
Chandpara Rural Hospital, the main medical facility in Gaighata CD Block, is located at Thakurnagar. The Bhaduria primary health centre at Ramchandrapur is located nearby.
