= Palla, North 24 Parganas =

Palla
- Village
- Location in West Bengal, India Palla (India)
- Coordinates: 23.03789°N 88.74668°E
- Country: India
- State: West Bengal
- District: North 24 Parganas

Population (2011)
  - Total: 5,508

Languages
  - Official: Bengali, English
- Time zone: UTC+5:30 (IST)
- PIN: 743701 (Palla)
- Telephone/STD code: 03215
- Lok Sabha constituency: Bangaon
- Vidhan Sabha constituency: Bangaon Dakshin
- Website: north24parganas.nic.in

Palla is a village and a gram panchayat in the Bangaon CD block in the Bangaon subdivision of the North 24 Parganas district in the state of West Bengal, India.

== Geography ==
Cities, towns and locations in Bangaon subdivision, North 24 Parganas district
M: municipal town, CT: census town, R: rural/ urban centre, T: place of tourist interest
Owing to space constraints in the small map, the actual locations in a larger map may vary slightly

=== Location ===
Palla is locate at 23.03789°N 88.74668°E.

=== Area overview ===
The area shown in the map was a part of Jessore district from 1883. At the time of Partition of Bengal (1947) the Radcliffe Line placed the police station areas of Bangaon and Gaighata of Jessore district in India and the area was made a part of 24 Parganas district. The renowned novelist, Bibhutibhushan Bandopadhyay (of Pather Panchali fame) belonged to this area and many of his writings portray his experience in the area. It is a flat plain located in the lower Ganges Delta. In the densely populated area, 16.33% of the population lives in the urban areas and 83.67% lives in the rural areas.

Note: The map alongside presents some of the notable locations in the subdivision. All places marked in the map are linked in the larger full screen map.

== Demographics ==
According to the 2011 Census of India, Palla had a total population of 5,058, of which 2,649 (52%) were males and 2,409 (48%) were females. Population in the age range 9–6 years was 452. The total number of literate persons in Palla was 4,058 (88.10% of the population over 6 years).

== Transport ==
Palla is on Gopalnagar Road.

== Education ==
Palla KPC High School is a co-educational higher secondary school with playgrounds and emphasis on all round development of students.

Nahata Jogendranath Mandal Smriti Mahavidyalaya at Nahata is located nearby.

== Healthcare ==
Sundarpur block primary health centre at Palla is the main medical facility in Bangaon CD Block. There are primary health centres at Garibpur (Akaipur PHC with 6 beds) and Chowberia (with 6 beds).
