= Panchita (disambiguation) =

Panchita is a town in West Bengal, India.

Panchita may also refer to

== People ==
- La Panchita (died 2014), a Mexican singer
- Francita Alavez (c. 1816 – c. 1906), or Panchita Alavez, a Mexican known as the "Angel of Goliad",
- Francisca Subirana (1900–1981), a Spanish tennis player usually known as Panchita Subirana
- Nadine Panchita Marshall (born 1972), an English actress

== Music and art ==
- La princesa Panchita (1958), a composition by Luis Advis
- "Panchita Zorolla", a portrait by the artist William Strang
- "La Abuela Panchita", a story by Isabel Allende
