= Bagdah, North 24 Parganas =

Bagdah Bagdaha
- Village
- Location in West Bengal, India Bagdah (India)
- Coordinates: 23.217832°N 88.885734°E
- Country: India
- State: West Bengal
- District: North 24 Parganas

Government
  - MLA: Soma Thakur (BJP)
  - M.P.: Shantanu Thakur (BJP)

Population (2011)
  - Total: 6,424

Languages
  - Official: Bengali, English
- Time zone: UTC+5:30 (IST)
- PIN: 743232 (Bagdah)
- Telephone/STD code: 03215
- Lok Sabha constituency: Bangaon
- Vidhan Sabha constituency: Bagdah
- Website: north24parganas.nic.in

Bagdah (also known as Bagdaha) is a village in the Bagdah CD block in the Bangaon subdivision of the North 24 Parganas district in the state of West Bengal, India.

== Geography ==
Cities, towns and locations in Bangaon subdivision, North 24 Parganas district
M: municipal town, CT: census town, R: rural/ urban centre, T: place of tourist interest
Owing to space constraints in the small map, the actual locations in a larger map may vary slightly

The Betna river flows past Bagdah.

=== Area overview ===
The area shown in the map was a part of Jessore district from 1883. At the time of the partition of India in 1947, the Radcliffe Line placed the police station areas of Bangaon and Gaighata of Jessore district in India and the area was made a part of 24 Parganas district. The renowned novelist, Bibhutibhushan Bandopadhyay (of Pather Panchali fame) belonged to this area and many of his writings portray his experience in the area. It is a flat plain located in the lower Ganges Delta. In the densely populated area, 16.33% of the population lives in the urban areas and 83.67% lives in the rural areas.

Note: The map alongside presents some of the notable locations in the subdivision. All places marked in the map are linked in the larger full screen map.

== Civic administration ==
=== CD block HQ ===
The headquarters of Bagdah CD block are located at Bagdah.

== Demographics ==
According to the 2011 Census of India, Bagdaha had a total population of 6,424, of which 3,348 (52%) were males and 3,076 (48%) were females. Population in the age range 0–6 years was 573. The total number of literate persons in Bagdaha was 4,378 (74.82% of the population over 6 years).

== Transport ==
The Bangaon-Boyra Road links Bagdah to SH 3 at Helencha,

== Education ==
Bagdah High School is a Bengali-medium co-educational higher secondary school. It was established in 1957 and has arrangements for teaching from Class V to XII.

== Healthcare ==
Bagdah Rural Hospital with 30 beds is the main medical facility in Bagdah CD block. There are primary health centres at Mangalganj (Nataberia PHC with 6 beds), Sindrani (with 10 beds) and at Beara (Koniara PHC with 6 beds).
