= Ichapur =

Ichapur Ichapore
- Village
- Location in West Bengal, India Ichapur (India)
- Coordinates: 22°48′N 88°22′E
- Country: India
- State: West Bengal
- District: North 24 Parganas

Population (2011)
  - Total: 5,999

Languages
  - Official: Bengali, English
- Time zone: UTC+5:30 (IST)
- PIN: 743249 (Ichapur)
- Telephone/STD code: 03215
- Lok Sabha constituency: Bangaon
- Vidhan Sabha constituency: Gaighata
- Website: north24parganas.nic.in

Ichapur (also known as Ichapore) is a town and a municipality in the Barrackpore II CD block in the Barrackpore subdivision of the North 24 Parganas district in the state of West Bengal, India.

== Civic administration ==
Ichapur is part of the Gaighata community development block in Bangaon subdivision of North 24 Parganas district. Ichapur I, Ichapur II, are part of the Gaighata West Bengal Legislative Assembly (Vidhan Sabha) constituency.

1) Ichapur I office in Gaighata.

2) Ichapur II office in Thakurnagar.

== Demographics ==
According to the 2011 Census of India, Ichapur had a total population of 5,999, of which 3,090 were males and 2,909 were females.

== Education ==
Village has 2 primary schools and one higher secondary school. It also has a girls Secondary School. Ichapur Free Primary School is the oldest Primary School in this locality. It is more than 150 Years old. Iswar Chandra Vidyasagar paid a visit in this school. Ichapur High School, a Co Ed School of this area is a leading School of this subdivision. In 2011, it has been announced as Model Resource Centre of Gaighata Block by the Sarva Sikhsha Mission. More than 1200 students study in this school. Besides normal secondary and Higher secondary section, it also provides Tailoring, Health Worker and Telephone Mobile Repairing courses which are done for VIII pass persons. Recently Rabindra Mukta Vidyalaya, an approved body of Govt. of West Bengal has recognized it as a study centre for Madhyamik.

== Transport ==
Nearest rail station is Gobardanga (5 km). It is Connected by Bus -DN12, Auto services and trolley van services. One can travel by car from Maslandpur or Gobardanga. The distance between Ichapur and Sealdah is 62 km. While Gaighta Police Station is 3 km away.
