= Deora, North 24 Parganas =

Deora
- Census Town
- Location in West Bengal, India Deora (India)
- Coordinates: 22.8813°N 88.7757°E
- Country: India
- State: West Bengal
- District: North 24 Parganas

Area
  - Total: 1.5904 km^{2} (0.6141 sq mi)
- Elevation: 10 m (33 ft)

Population (2011)
  - Total: 4,360
  - Density: 2,740/km^{2} (7,100/sq mi)

Languages
  - Official: Bengali, English
- Time zone: UTC+5:30 (IST)
- PIN: 743286
- Telephone code: 03217
- Vehicle registration: WB
- Lok Sabha constituency: Bangaon
- Vidhan Sabha constituency: Swarupnagar (Vidhan Sabha constituency)

Deora is a census town in the Swarupnagar CD block in the Basirhat subdivision of North 24 Parganas district in the state of West Bengal, India.

== Geography ==
Cities, towns and locations in Basirhat subdivision, North 24 Parganas district
M: municipal town, CT: census town, R: rural/ urban centre
Owing to space constraints in the small map, the actual locations in a larger map may vary slightly

=== Location ===
Deora is located at 22.8813°N 88.7757°E.

=== Area overview ===
The area shown in the map is a part of the Ichhamati-Raimangal Plain, located in the lower Ganges Delta. It contains soil of mature black or brownish loam to recent alluvium. Numerous rivers, creeks and khals criss-cross the area. The tip of the Sundarbans National Park is visible in the lower part of the map (shown in green but not marked). The larger full screen map shows the full forest area. A large section of the area is a part of the Sundarbans settlements. The densely populated area is overwhelmingly a rural area. Only 12.96% of the population lives in the urban areas and 87.04% of the population lives in the rural areas.

Note: The map alongside presents some of the notable locations in the subdivision. All places marked in the map are linked in the larger full screen map.

== Demographics ==
According to the 2011 Census of India, Deora had a total population of 4,360, of which 2,255 (52%) were males and 2,105 (48%) were females. Population in the age range 0–6 years was 296. The total number of literate persons in Deora was 3,716 (91.44% of the population over 6 years).

== Infrastructure ==
According to the District Census Handbook, North Twenty Four Parganas, 2011, Deora covered an area of 1.5904 km^{2}. It had 12 km roads with both open and closed drains. The protected water-supply involved overhead tank and tap water from treated sources. It had 1,200 domestic electric connections and 20 road lighting points. Among the medical facilities it had 1 dispensary/ health centre. Among the educational facilities, it had 7 primary schools, 4 middle schools, 1 secondary school and 1 higher secondary school. The nearest college was 4 km away at Gobardanga. Deora produces paddy, jute and vegetables.
