= Tengra =

Tengra Tangra
- Village
- Location in West Bengal, India Tengra (India)
- Coordinates: 23.12779°N 88.847568°E
- Country: India
- State: West Bengal
- District: North 24 Parganas

Population (2011)
  - Total: 4,226

Languages
  - Official: Bengali, English
- Time zone: UTC+5:30 (IST)
- PIN: 743251 (Ganrapota)
- Telephone/STD code: 03215
- Lok Sabha constituency: Bangaon
- Vidhan Sabha constituency: Bagdah
- Website: north24parganas.nic.in

Tengra (also known as Tangra) is a village and a gram panchayat in Bangaon CD Block in Bangaon subdivision of North 24 Parganas district in the state of West Bengal, India.

== Geography ==
Villages in Tengra gram panchayat are: Arshingri, Dhoramari, Shutia and Tengra. Tengra is about 8 km from Bangaon.

== Demographics ==
As per the 2011 Census of India, Tengra had a total population of 4,226, of which 2,184 (52%) were males and 2,042 (48%) were females. Population below 6 years was 354. The total number of literates in Tengra was 3,371 (87.06% of the population over 6 years).

== Transport ==
A short stretch of local road links Tengra to State Highway 3 at Ganrapota.
