= Swarupnagar, North 24 Parganas =

Swarupnagar
- Village
- Location in West Bengal, India Swarupnagar (India)
- Coordinates: 22.824345°N 88.85612°E
- Country: India
- State: West Bengal
- District: North 24 Parganas

Languages
  - Official: Bengali, English
- Time zone: UTC+5:30 (IST)
- PIN: 743286 (Swarupnagar)
- Telephone/STD code: 03217
- Lok Sabha constituency: Bangaon
- Vidhan Sabha constituency: Swarupnagar
- Website: north24parganas.nic.in

Swarupnagar is a village in the Swarupnagar CD block in the Basirhat subdivision of the North 24 Parganas district in the state of West Bengal, India.

== Geography ==
Cities, towns and locations in Basirhat subdivision, North 24 Parganas district
M: municipal town, CT: census town, R: rural/ urban centre
Owing to space constraints in the small map, the actual locations in a larger map may vary slightly

=== Location ===
Swarupnagar is located at 22.824345°N 88.85612°E.

=== Area overview ===
The area shown in the map is a part of the Ichhamati-Raimangal Plain, located in the lower Ganges Delta. It contains soil of mature black or brownish loam to recent alluvium. Numerous rivers, creeks and khals criss-cross the area. The tip of the Sundarbans National Park is visible in the lower part of the map (shown in green but not marked). The larger full screen map shows the full forest area. A large section of the area is a part of the Sundarbans settlements. The densely populated area is an overwhelmingly rural area. Only 12.96% of the population lives in the urban areas and 87.04% of the population lives in the rural areas.

Note: The map alongside presents some of the notable locations in the subdivision. All places marked in the map are linked in the larger full screen map.

== Civic administration ==
=== Police station ===
Swarupnagar police station covers an area of 217.17 km^{2} and serves a population of 261,200. Swarpnagar police district has a border of 42 km, all of which is unfenced. 32 km is land border and 10 km is riverine border. It has jurisdiction over Swarupnagar CD block. There is an out-post at Charghat.

=== CD block HQ ===
The headquarters of Swarupnagar CD block are located at Swarupnagar.

== Demographics ==
In the map of Swarupnagar CD Block in the District Census Handbook for North 24 Parganas, Swarupnagar is shown as being part of Village No. 815 Banglani.

According to the 2011 Census of India, Banglani had a total population of 24,422, of which 12,532 (51%) were males and 11,890 (49%) were females. Population in the age range 0–6 years was 2,476. The total number of literate persons in Banglani was 16,884 (76.93% of the population over 6 years).

== Cattle smuggling ==
In the 2013 panchayat elections, the Left Front snatched the Swarupnagar Panchayat Samiti, under control of the Trinamool Congress for the previous two terms. The Left also won 7 of the 10 gram panchayats in Swarupnagar CD Block. Apart from other reasons, one major factor, according to media sources, was the links of the local Trinamool Congress activists with cattle smugglers. A large section of the population in this impoverished border region is involved in cattle smuggling. The cattle smugglers are deeply rooted in local society. They not only pay for the services they demand, but they also attack the villagers, burn their houses and molest the women when their orders are not followed. No one dares to stand up to the cattle smugglers, but the local people can vote in elections and vent their feelings. According to estimates of the villagers, more than 5,000-6,000 cows were smuggled every week through the Amudia border under Swarupnagar PS. However, with improved vigil and political support from the West Bengal chief minister, cattle smuggling has decreased considerably.

== Transport ==
The Taranipur-Tentulia Road and the Tetulia-Basirhat Road links Swarupnagar with Basirhat, via Tentulia. Hakimpur Main Road links Swarupnagar with Hakimpur Bazar on the India-Bangladesh border and the Ichhamati.

== Education ==
Saheed Nurul Islam Mahavidyalaya at Gokulpur-Harishpur, PO Tentulia, was established in 2001. Affiliated to the West Bengal State University it offers honours courses in Bengali, English, Sanskrit, Arabic, history, education, political science, geography and philosophy, and general courses in arts and science.

== Healthcare ==
Sarapole (Sonarpur) Rural Hospital at Sarapul is located nearby.
