= Shimulpur =

- Census Town
- Location in West Bengal, India Shimulpur (India)
- Coordinates: 22.936231°N 88.786246°E
- Country: India
- State: West Bengal
- District: North 24 Parganas

Area
  - Total: 5.8747 km^{2} (2.2682 sq mi)
- Elevation: 10 m (33 ft)

Population (2011)
  - Total: 20,803
  - Density: 3,541.1/km^{2} (9,171.5/sq mi)

Languages
  - Official: Bengali, English
- Time zone: UTC+5:30 (IST)
- PIN: 743289
- Telephone code: 03216
- Vehicle registration: WB
- Lok Sabha constituency: Bangaon
- Vidhan Sabha constituency: Bangaon Dakshin

Shimulpur is a census town in the Gaighata CD block in the Bangaon subdivision of North 24 Parganas district in the state of West Bengal, India.

== Geography ==
Cities, towns and locations in Bangaon subdivision, North 24 Parganas district
M: municipal town, CT: census town, R: rural/ urban centre, T: place of tourist interest
Owing to space constraints in the small map, the actual locations in a larger map may vary slightly

=== Location ===
Shimulpur is located at 22.936231°N 88.786246°E.

=== Area overview ===
The area shown in the map was a part of Jessore district from 1883. At the time of Partition of Bengal (1947) the Radcliffe Line placed the police station areas of Bangaon and Gaighata of Jessore district in India and the area was made a part of 24 Parganas district. The renowned novelist, Bibhutibhushan Bandopadhyay (of Pather Panchali fame) belonged to this area and many of his writings portray his experience in the area. It is a flat plain located in the lower Ganges Delta. In the densely populated area, 16.33% of the population lives in the urban areas and 83.67% lives in the rural areas.

Note: The map alongside presents some of the notable locations in the subdivision. All places marked in the map are linked in the larger full screen map.

== Demographics ==
According to the 2011 Census of India, Shimulpur had a total population of 20,803, of which 10,504 (50%) were males and 10,299 (50%) were females. Population in the age range 0-6 years was 1,868. The total number of literate persons in Shimulpur was 15,758 (83.22% of the population over 6 years).

== Infrastructure ==
According to the District Census Handbook, North Twenty Four Parganas, 2011, Shimulpur covered an area of 5.8747 km^{2}. It had 17 km roads, with both open and closed drains. The protected water-supply involved hand pumps. It had 5,230 domestic electric connections. Among the educational facilities, it had 39 primary schools, 2 middle schools, 1 secondary school and 1 higher secondary school. The nearest college was 5 km away at Gobardanga. It had branches of 3 nationalised banks, 1 private commercial bank, 2 cooperative banks, 3 agricultural credit societies.
