= Tapan Kumar Biswas =

Indian academic

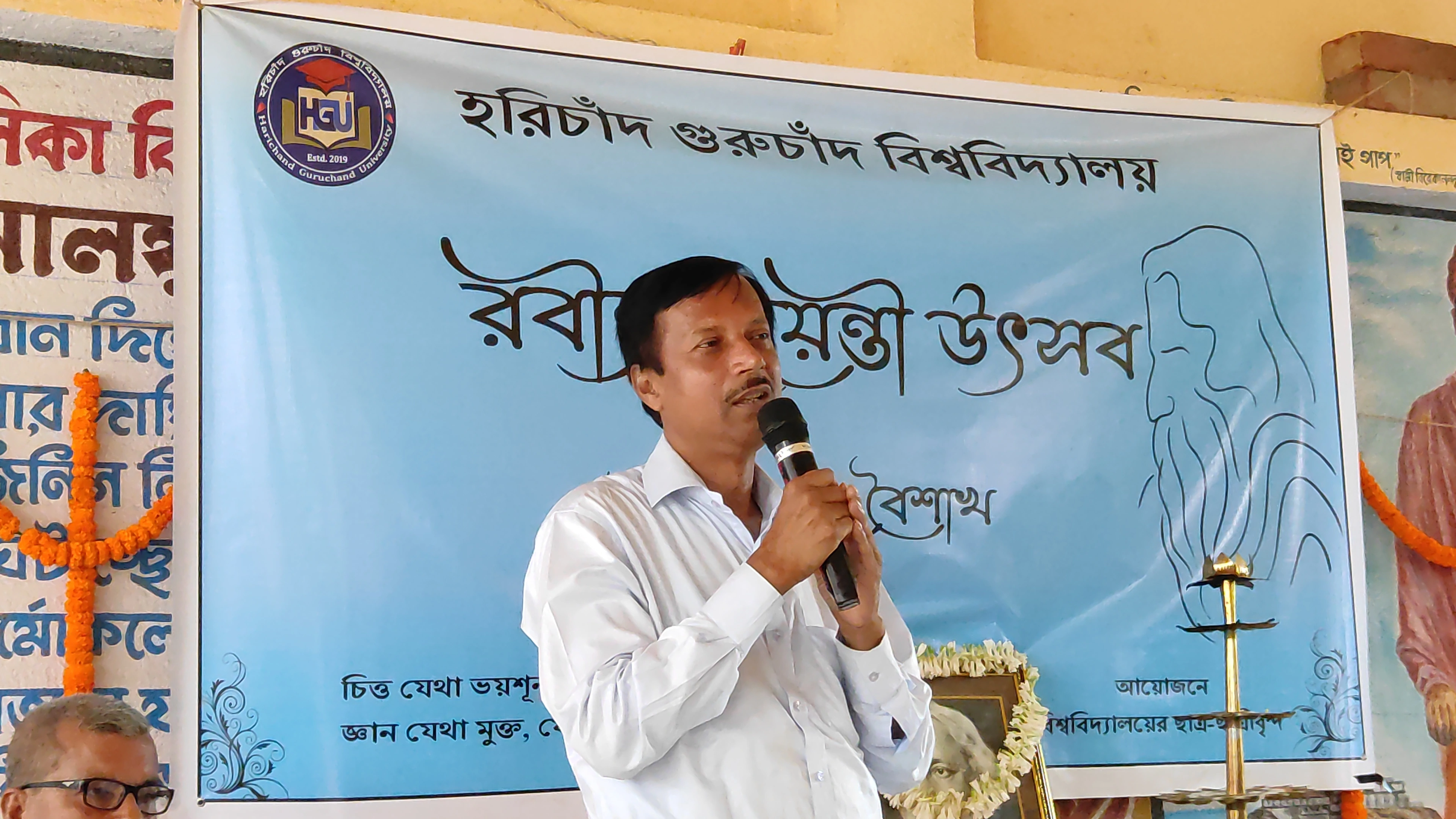
- Born: 13 September 1964 (age 62); West Bengal, India

Academic work
- Institutions: Asutosh College (1996-2000); University of Kalyani (2000-present)

Tapan Kumar Biswas (born 13 September 1964, West Bengal) is an Indian academic. His publications delve into various facets of Bengali folk culture, language, and literature.

== Education ==
Biswas earned a Master of Arts, Doctor of Philosophy, and Doctor of Letters.

== Career ==
Biswas began his teaching career at Asutosh College, where he joined as an assistant professor in 1996. He later joined the Department of Folklore at the University of Kalyani in 2000 and has been continuing here since then.

Dr. Biswas’s leadership extends beyond the classroom. He assumed various administrative roles, including Dean of the PG Faculty of Arts & Commerce at the University of Kalyani from 2017 to 2020.

Biswas also served as the vice-chancellor (officiating) at the University of Kalyani for a brief period in 2017. He also served as vice chancellor at Harichand Guruchand University from 30 January 2021 to 29 January 2023 and again from 9 March 2023 to 8 June 2023.

== Publications ==
Biswas has published 15 books. Three books published by LAP Lambert Academic Publishing in many languages (Portuguese, French, Italian Edition)

Notable works include:

1. Ethno-Mathematics and Folk Science: A Study on Folkloristics and Sociological Perspective. Lambert Academic Publishing. 2023. ISBN 978-620-7-45500-3.
2. Folk Research Methodology: A New Perspective and Dimension. Lambert Academic Publishing. 2023. ISBN 978-620-7-45325-2.
3. Education and Social Movement of Shree Shree Guruchand Thakur: Its Impact on Matua & Back-Retained People's Life of Bengal. Lambert Academic Publishing. 2024. ISBN 978-6-207-45569-0.
4. Methodik der Volksforschung: Eine neue Sichtweise und Dimension. Verlag Unser Wissen Publishing. 2024. ISBN 978-620-7-06272-0. Language : German
5. Mthodologie de la recherche folklorique. Editions Notre Savoir Publishing. 2024. ISBN 978-620-7-06273-7. Language : French
6. Metodologia di ricerca popolare. Edizioni Sapienza Publishing. 2024. ISBN 978-620-7-06274-4. Language : Italian
7. ducation et mouvement social de Shree Shree Guruchand Thakur. Editions Notre Savoir Publishing. 2024. ISBN 978-620-7-28013-1. Language : French
8. Educao e movimento social de Shree Shree Guruchand Thakur. Edicoes Nosso Conhecimento Publishing. 2024. ISBN 978-620-7-28019-3. Language : Portuguese
9. Educazione e movimento sociale di Shree Shree Guruchand Thakur. Edizioni Sapienza Publishing. 2024. ISBN 978-620-7-28014-8. Language : Italian
10. Bildung und soziale Bewegung von Shree Shree Guruchand Thakur. Verlag Unser Wissen Publishing. 2024. ISBN 978-620-7-28010-0. Language : German
11. Educación y movimiento social de Shree Shree Guruchand Thakur. Ediciones Nuestro Conocimiento Publishing. 2024. ISBN 978-620-7-28012-4. Language : Spanish
