= Bina Mondal =

Indian politician

Member of the West Bengal Legislative Assembly
- Incumbent
- Assumed office May 2011
- Preceded by: Mustafa Bin Quassem
- Constituency: Swarupnagar

Personal details
- Party: Trinamool Congress (until 2026); Democratic Trinamool Congress (from 2026)

Bina Mondal is an Indian politician. She was elected to the West Bengal Legislative Assembly from Swarupnagar as a member of the Democratic Trinamool Congress.
