= Bangaon (community development block) =

- Community development block
- Interactive map of Bangaon
- Coordinates: 22.9897900°N 88.6755680°E
- Country: India
- State: West Bengal
- District: North 24 Parganas

Government
  - Type: Representative democracy

Area
  - Total: 336.70 km^{2} (130.00 sq mi)
- Elevation: 11 m (36 ft)

Population (2011)
  - Total: 380,903
  - Density: 1,131.3/km^{2} (2,930.0/sq mi)

Languages
  - Official: Bengali, English

Literacy (2011)
  - Total literates: 273,967 (79.71%)
- Time zone: UTC+5:30 (IST)
- PIN: 743251(Ganrapota); 743262(Gopalnagar); 743701(Palla)
- Telephone/STD code: 03215
- ISO 3166 code: IN-WB
- Vehicle registration: WB-25, WB-26, WB-27, WB-28
- Lok Sabha constituency: Bangaon
- Vidhan Sabha constituency: Bangaon Uttar, Bangaon Dakshin, Bagdah
- Website: north24parganas.nic.in

Bangaon (also spelled as Bongaon) is a community development block that forms an administrative division in Bangaon subdivision of North 24 Parganas district in the Indian state of West Bengal.

== Geography ==
Chawberia, a constituent panchayat of Bangaon block, is located at 22°59′23″N 88°40′32″E.

Bangaon CD Block is bounded by Bagdah CD block in the north, Sharsha Upazila in Jessore District of Bangladesh in the east, Gaighata and Habra I CD blocks in the south, and Haringhata and Chakdaha CD blocks in Nadia district in the west.

Bangaon is part of the Ichhamati-Raimangal Plain, one of the three physiographic regions in the district located in the lower Ganges Delta. It contains soil of mature black or brownish loam to recent alluvium. The Ichhamati flows through the eastern part of the district.

Bangaon has an area of 336.70 km^{2}. It has 1 panchayat samity, 16 gram panchayats, 230 gram sansads (village councils), 150 mouzas and 149 inhabited villages. Gopalnagar police station serves this block. The headquarters of this CD block is at Bangaon, hence the name.

Gram panchayats of Bangaon block/ panchayat samiti are: Akaipur, Chhaighoria, Gangrapota, Kalupur, Bairampur, Dharam Pukuria, Ghatbour, Palla, Chawberia I, Dighari, Gopalnagar I, Sundarpur, Chawberia II, Ganganandapur, Gopalnagar II and Tengra.

== Demographics ==
=== Population ===
In the 2011 Census of India Bongaon had a total population of 380,903, all of which were rural. There were 196,487 (52%) males and 184,416 (48%) females. Population below 6 years was 37,209. Scheduled Castes numbered 177,503 (46.60%) and Scheduled Tribes numbered 13,765 (3.61%).

In the 2001 census, Bangaon block had a population of 343,974 out of which 177,515 were males and 166,459 were females.

Large villages in Bangaon are (2011 census figures in brackets) Nakful (4,499), Sabhaipur (4,032), Panchita (5,148), Bharatpur (4,400), Kundipur (4,760), Krishnachandrapur (4,901), Bangangram (6,144), Arsingri (4,511), Tengra (4,226), Bhasanpota (4,376), Manigram (5,306), Paikpara (6,397), Chhayagharia (10,891), Kalupur (10,413), Purana Bangaon (8,265), Kamdebpur (4,011), Barakpur (6,945), Khamarkalla (12,645), Kansona (7,334), Santoshpur (4,168), Sanakpur (4,057), Palla (5,058), Dighari (4,241), Chauberia (8,039) and Ichhlampur (6,886).

North 24 Parganas district is densely populated, mainly because of the influx of refugees from East Pakistan (later Bangladesh). With a density of population of 2,182 per km^{2} in 1971, it was 3rd in terms of density per km^{2} in West Bengal after Kolkata and Howrah, and 20th in India. According to the District Human Development Report: North 24 Parganas, “High density is also explained partly by the rapid growth of urbanization in the district. In 1991, the percentage of urban population in the district has been 51.23.”

Decadal Population Growth Rate (%)

The decadal growth of population in Bangaon in 2001-2011 was 10.71%. The decadal growth of population in Bangaon in 1991-2001 was 16.85%.

The decadal growth rate of population in North 24 Parganas district was as follows: 47.9% in 1951-61, 34.5% in 1961-71, 31.4% in 1971-81, 31.7% in 1981-91, 22.7% in 1991-2001 and 12.0% in 2001-11. The decadal growth rate for West Bengal in 2001-11 was 13.93%. The decadal growth rate for West Bengal was 17.84% in 1991-2001, 24.73% in 1981-1991 and 23.17% in 1971-1981.

Only a small portion of the border with Bangladesh has been fenced and it is popularly referred to as a porous border. It is freely used by Bangladeshi infiltrators, terrorists, smugglers, criminals, et al.

=== Literacy ===
In the 2011 census, the total number of literates in Bangaon was 273,967 (79.71% of the population over 6 years) out of which males numbered 149,598 (84.27% of the male population over 6 years) and females numbered 124,369 (74.84% of the female population over 6 years). The gender disparity (the difference between female and male literacy rates) was 9.42%.

See also – List of West Bengal districts ranked by literacy rate

Literacy in CD blocks of
North 24 Parganas district
Barasat Sadar subdivision
Amdanga – 80.69%
Deganga – 79.65%
Barasat I – 81.50%
Barasat II – 77.71%
Habra I – 83.15%
Habra II – 81.05%
Rajarhat – 83.13%
Basirhat subdivision
Baduria – 78.75%
Basirhat I – 72.10%
Basirhat II – 78.30%
Haroa – 73.13%
Hasnabad – 71.47%
Hingalganj – 76.85%
Minakhan – 71.33%
Sandeshkhali I – 71.08%
Sandeshkhali II – 70.96%
Swarupnagar – 77.57%
Bangaon subdivision
Bagdah – 75.30%
Bangaon – 79.71%
Gaighata – 82.32%
Barrackpore subdivision
Barrackpore I – 85.91%
Barrackpore II – 84.53%
Source: 2011 Census: CD Block Wise
Primary Census Abstract Data

=== Language and religion ===
Religion in Bongaon CD block (2011)
Hinduism	78.17%
Islam	20.83%
Other or not stated	1.00%

In the 2011 census Hindus numbered 297,755 and formed 78.17% of the population in Bangaon. Muslims numbered 79,338 and formed 20.83% of the population. Others numbered 3,810 and formed 1.00% of the population.

In 1981 Hindus numbered 182,693 and formed 79.7% of the population and Muslims numbered 45,845 and formed 20.09% of the population. In 1991 Hindus numbered 235,538 and formed 80.00% of the population and Muslims numbered 58,119 and formed 19.74% of the population in Bangaon. (The 1981 and 1991 censuses were conducted as per the jurisdiction of the police station). In 2001 in Bongaon CD block, Hindus were 272438 (79.19%) and Muslims 69,777 (20.28%).

Bengali is the predominant language, spoken by 99.19% of the population.

== Rural Poverty ==
27.70% of households in Bangaon lived below the poverty line in 2001, against an average of 29.28% in North 24 Parganas district.

== Economy ==
=== Livelihood ===
Livelihood
in Bangaon CD Block
1. Cultivators (23.8%)
2. Agricultural labourers (38.1%)
3. Household industries (5.22%)
4. Other Workers (32.9%)

In Bangaon in 2011, amongst the class of total workers, cultivators numbered 32,922 and formed 23.80% of the total workers, agricultural labourers numbered 52,684 and formed 38.09%, household industry workers numbered 7,225 and formed 5.22% and other workers numbered 45,473 and formed 32.88%. Total workers numbered 138,304 and formed 36.31% of the total population, and non-workers numbered 242,599 and formed 63.69% of the population.

In more than 30 percent of the villages in North 24 Parganas, agriculture or household industry is no longer the major source of livelihood for the main workers there. The CD blocks in the district can be classified as belonging to three categories: border areas, Sundarbans area and other rural areas. The percentage of other workers in the other rural areas category is considerably higher than those in the border areas and Sundarbans areas.

Note: In the census records a person is considered a cultivator, if the person is engaged in cultivation/ supervision of land owned by self/government/institution. When a person who works on another person’s land for wages in cash or kind or share, is regarded as an agricultural labourer. Household industry is defined as an industry conducted by one or more members of the family within the household or village, and one that does not qualify for registration as a factory under the Factories Act. Other workers are persons engaged in some economic activity other than cultivators, agricultural labourers and household workers. It includes factory, mining, plantation, transport and office workers, those engaged in business and commerce, teachers, entertainment artistes and so on.

=== Infrastructure ===
There are 149 inhabited villages in Bangaon, according to the district census handbook: North 24 Parganas. 100% villages have power supply. 148 villages (99.33%) have drinking water supply. 44 villages (29.53%) have post offices. 123 villages (85.23%) have telephones (including landlines, public call offices and mobile phones). 100 villages (67.11%) have a pucca approach road and 51 villages (34.23%) have transport communication (includes bus service, rail facility and navigable waterways). 19 villages (12.75%) have agricultural credit societies and 17 villages (11.41%) have banks.

=== Agriculture ===
The North 24 Parganas district Human Development Report opines that in spite of agricultural productivity in North 24 Parganas district being rather impressive 81.84% of rural population suffered from shortage of food. With a high urbanisation of 54.3% in 2001, the land use pattern in the district is changing quite fast and the area under cultivation is declining. However, agriculture is still the major source of livelihood in the rural areas of the district.

From 1977 on wards major land reforms took place in West Bengal. Land in excess of land ceiling was acquired and distributed amongst the peasants. Following land reforms land ownership pattern has undergone transformation. In 2010-11, persons engaged in agriculture in Banagaon could be classified as follows: bargadars 3,565 (4.30%), patta (document) holders 4,211 (5.08%), small farmers (possessing land between 1 and 2 hectares) 8,375 (10.10%), marginal farmers (possessing land up to 1 hectare) 29,098 (35.08%) and agricultural labourers 37,705 (45.45%).

Bangaon had 211 fertiliser depots, 43 seed stores and 78 fair price shops in 2010-11.

In 2010-11, Bangaon produced 29,164 tonnes of aman paddy, the main winter crop from 11,815 hectares, 29,629 tonnes of Boro paddy (spring crop) from 8,716 hectares, 8,465 tonnes of Aus paddy (summer crop) from 4,855 hectares, 1,485 tonnes of wheat from 471 hectares, 107,748 tonnes of jute from 7,143 hectares, 29,566 tonnes of potatoes from 834 hectares and 3,248 tonnes of sugar cane from 40 hectares. It also produced pulses and oilseeds.

In 2010-11, the total area irrigated in Bangaon was 6,312 hectares, out of which 320 hectares were irrigated canal water, 50 hectares by tank water, 950 hectares by river lift irrigation, 1,392 hectares by deep tube well, 500 hectares by shallow tube well and 3,420 hectares by other means.

=== Pisciculture ===
In 2010-11, the net area under effective pisciculture in Bangaon was 2,212.44 hectares. 57,685 persons were engaged in the profession. Approximate annual production was 66,373.2 quintals.

=== Banking ===
In 2010-11, Bangaon had offices of 18 commercial banks and 2 gramin banks.

== Transport ==
In 2010-11, Bangaon had 11 originating/terminating bus routes.

NH 112 (old numbering NH 35) (also known as Jessore Road) meets SH 1 and SH 3 at Bangaon, and then moves on to the Bangladesh border at Petrapole.

Bangaon Junction railway station is last station on both the Sealdah-Bangaon line and the Ranaghat - Bangaon section. Apart from Bangaon Junction, there is Bibhuti Bhushan Halt railway station.

== Education ==
In 2010-11, Bangaon had 191 primary schools with 20,426 students, 8 high schools with 5,301 students and 29 higher secondary schools with 38,301 students. Bongaon had one general college with 2,511 students and 593 institutions for special and non-formal education with 19,744 students.

Nahata Jogendranath Mandal Smriti Mahavidyalaya was established at Nahata in 1985.

In the 2011 census, in Bangaon, amongst the 149 inhabited villages, 1 village did not have a school, 73 villages had more than 1 primary school, 69 villages had at least 1 primary and 1 middle school and 49 villages had at least 1 middle and 1 secondary school.

== Healthcare ==
In 2011, Bangaon had one block primary health centre and 3 primary health centres, with total 10 beds and 5 doctors (excluding private bodies). It had 55 family welfare subcentres. 115,621 patients were treated outdoor in the hospitals, health centres and subcentres of the CD block.

There are primary health centres at Garibpur (Akaipur PHC with 6 beds) and Chowberia (with 6 beds).

Bangaon block is one of the areas where ground water is affected by arsenic contamination.
