= Swarupnagar =

- Community development block
- Interactive map of Swarupnagar
- Coordinates: 22.8333°N 88.8667°E
- Country: India
- State: West Bengal
- District: North 24 Parganas

Government
  - Type: Representative democracy

Area
  - Total: 215.13 km^{2} (83.06 sq mi)
- Elevation: 9 m (30 ft)

Population (2011)
  - Total: 256,075
  - Density: 1,190.3/km^{2} (3,082.9/sq mi)

Languages
  - Official: Bengali, English

Literacy (2011)
  - Total literates: 178,557 (77.57%)
- Time zone: UTC+5:30 (IST)
- PIN: 743286 (Swarupnagar)
- Telephone/STD code: 03217
- ISO 3166 code: IN-WB
- Vehicle registration: WB-23, WB-24, WB-25, WB-26
- Lok Sabha constituency: Bangaon
- Vidhan Sabha constituency: Swarupnagar
- Website: north24parganas.nic.in

Swarupnagar is a community development block that forms an administrative division in Basirhat subdivision of North 24 Parganas district in the Indian state of West Bengal.

== Geography ==
Swarupnagar is located at 22.8333°N 88.8667°E.

Swarupnagar CD Block is bounded by Gaighata CD Block in the north, Kalaroa Upazila in Satkhira District of Bangladesh in the east, Baduria CD Block in the south and west, and Habra I CD Block in the west.

Swarupnagar CD Block is part of the Ichhamati-Raimangal Plain, one of the three physiographic regions in the district located in the lower Ganges Delta. It contains soil of mature black or brownish loam to recent alluvium. The Ichhamati flows through the eastern part of the district.

Swarupnagar CD Block has an area of 215.13 km^{2}. It has 1 panchayat samity, 10 gram panchayats, 169 gram sansads (village councils), 66 mouzas and 66 inhabited villages, as per the District Statistical Handbook: 24 Parganas North. Swarupnagar police station serves this block. Headquarters of this CD Block is at Swarupnagar.

Gram panchayats of Swarupnagar block/ panchayat samiti are: Balti Nityanandakati, Bithari Hakimpur, Kaijuri, Swarupnagar Banglani, Charghat, Saguna, Bankra Gokulpur, Gobindapur, Sharapul Nirman and Tepur Mirzapur.

== Demographics ==
=== Population ===
As per 2011 Census of India Swarupnagar CD Block had a total population of 256,075, of which 251,715 were rural and 4,360 were urban. There were 131,510 (51%) males and 124,565 (49%) females. Population below 6 years was 25,896. Scheduled Castes numbered 79,534 (31.06%) and Scheduled Tribes numbered 648 (0.25%).

As per 2001 census, Swarupngar block has a total population of 226,333 out of which 115,630 were males and 110,703 were females. Swarupnagar block registered a population growth of 12.91 per cent during the 1991-2001 decade. Decadal growth for the district was 22.40 per cent.

There is one census town in Swarupnagar CD Block (2011 census figure in brackets) : Deora (4,360).

Large villages in Swarupnagar CD Block were (2011 census figures in brackets): Parui (5,454), Kanchdah (6,224), Taranipur (4,569), Gobindapur (5,481), Purba Polta (7,483), Nalabara (7,572), Charghat (6,819), Gopalpur (6,799), Sarapul (8,290), Malanga Para (5,485), Banglani (24,422), Gokulpur (6,638), Galdaha (4,129), Chhota Bankra (4,040), Bara Bankra (6,866), Nirman (5,088), Dattapara (8,532), Bithari (19,287), Hakimpur (10,145), Nityananda Kati (4,190), Balti (4,407), Nabat Kati (4,207), Kaijuri (5,674) and Bhaduria (4,900).

North 24 Parganas district is densely populated, mainly because of the influx of refugees from East Pakistan (later Bangladesh). With a density of population of 2,182 per km^{2} in 1971, it was 3rd in terms of density per km^{2} in West Bengal after Kolkata and Howrah, and 20th in India. According to the District Human Development Report: North 24 Parganas, “High density is also explained partly by the rapid growth of urbanization in the district. In 1991, the percentage of urban population in the district has been 51.23.”

Decadal Population Growth Rate (%)

The decadal growth of population in Swarupnagar CD Block in 2001-2011 was 13.00%. The decadal growth of population in Swarupnagar CD Block in 1991-2001 was 13.05%.

The decadal growth rate of population in North 24 Parganas district was as follows: 47.9% in 1951–61, 34.5% in 1961–71, 31.4% in 1971–81, 31.7% in 1981–91, 22.7% in 1991-2001 and 12.0% in 2001–11. The decadal growth rate for West Bengal in 2001-11 was 13.93%. The decadal growth rate for West Bengal was 17.84% in 1991–2001, 24.73% in 1981-1991 and 23.17% in 1971–1981.

Only a small portion of the border with Bangladesh has been fenced and it is popularly referred to as a porous border. It is freely used by Bangladeshi infiltrators, terrorists, smugglers, criminals. et al. As of 2017 the whole border area is totally fenced and heavily guarded by border security forces. Bangladeshi illegal migrant worker who used to come and return through this border has stopped now. Bangladeshi Hindu population still come here to settle permanently. Many of them voters both in Bangladesh and India. In fact in 2001 census Muslim population of this block was 60 percent. But due to heavy infiltration of Hindus of Bangladesh now it is 50-50. The block has unprecedented communal harmony.

=== Literacy ===
As per the 2011 census, the total number of literates in Swarupnagar CD Block was 178,557 (77.57% of the population over 6 years) out of which males numbered 96,711 (81.78% of the male population over 6 years) and females numbered 81,846 (73.72% of the female population over 6 years). The gender disparity (the difference between female and male literacy rates) was 8.07%.

See also – List of West Bengal districts ranked by literacy rate

Literacy in CD blocks of
North 24 Parganas district
Barasat Sadar subdivision
Amdanga – 80.69%
Deganga – 79.65%
Barasat I – 81.50%
Barasat II – 77.71%
Habra I – 83.15%
Habra II – 81.05%
Rajarhat – 83.13%
Basirhat subdivision
Baduria – 78.75%
Basirhat I – 72.10%
Basirhat II – 78.30%
Haroa – 73.13%
Hasnabad – 71.47%
Hingalganj – 76.85%
Minakhan – 71.33%
Sandeshkhali I – 71.08%
Sandeshkhali II – 70.96%
Swarupnagar – 77.57%
Bangaon subdivision
Bagdah – 75.30%
Bangaon – 79.71%
Gaighata – 82.32%
Barrackpore subdivision
Barrackpore I – 85.91%
Barrackpore II – 84.53%
Source: 2011 Census: CD Block Wise
Primary Census Abstract Data

=== Language and religion ===
Religion in Swarupnagar CD block (2011)
Hinduism	52.17%
Islam	47.58%
Other or not stated	0.25%

In the 2011 census Hindus numbered 133,597 and formed 52.17% of the population in Swarupnagar CD Block. Muslims numbered 121,842 and formed 47.58% of the population. Others numbered 636 and formed 0.25% of the population.

In 1981 Hindus numbered 89,374 and formed 57.64% of the population and Muslims numbered 65,668 and formed 42.35% of the population. In 1991 Hindus numbered 112,851 and formed 56.30% of the population and Muslims numbered 87,597 and formed 43.70% of the population in Swarupnagar CD Block. (In 1981 and 1991 census was conducted as per jurisdiction of the police station). In 2001 in Baduria CD block Hindus were 123,384 (54.45%) and Muslims 102,911 (45.41%).

Bengali is the predominant language, spoken by 99.82% of the population.

== Rural Poverty ==
27.21% of households in Swarupnagar CD Block lived below poverty line in 2001, against an average of 29.28% in North 24 Parganas district.

== Economy ==
=== Livelihood ===
Livelihood
in Swarupnagar CD Block
1. Cultivators (24.8%)
2. Agricultural labourers (43.5%)
3. Household industries (5.32%)
4. Other Workers (26.4%)

In Swarupnagar CD Block in 2011, amongst the class of total workers, cultivators numbered 23,951 and formed 24.75% of the total workers, agricultural labourers numbered 42,144 and formed 43.55%, household industry workers numbered 5,145 and formed 5.32% and other workers numbered 25,530 and formed 26.38%. Total workers numbered 96,770 and formed 37.79% of the total population, and non-workers numbered 159,305 and formed 62.21% of the population.

In more than 30 percent of the villages in North 24 Parganas, agriculture or household industry is no longer the major source of livelihood for the main workers there. The CD Blocks in the district can be classified as belonging to three categories: border areas, Sundarbans area and other rural areas. The percentage of other workers in the other rural areas category is considerably higher than those in the border areas and Sundarbans area.

Note: In the census records a person is considered a cultivator, if the person is engaged in cultivation/ supervision of land owned by self/government/institution. When a person who works on another person's land for wages in cash or kind or share, is regarded as an agricultural labourer. Household industry is defined as an industry conducted by one or more members of the family within the household or village, and one that does not qualify for registration as a factory under the Factories Act. Other workers are persons engaged in some economic activity other than cultivators, agricultural labourers and household workers. It includes factory, mining, plantation, transport and office workers, those engaged in business and commerce, teachers, entertainment artistes and so on.

=== Infrastructure ===
There are 65 inhabited villages in Swarupnagar CD Block, as per the District Census Handbook: North 24 Parganas. 100% villages have power supply and drinking water supply. 24 villages (36.92%) have post offices. 65 villages (100%) have telephones (including landlines, public call offices and mobile phones). 47 villages (72.31%) have a pucca approach road and 32 villages (49.23%) have transport communication (includes bus service, rail facility and navigable waterways). 4 villages (6.15%) have agricultural credit societies and 19 villages (29.23%) have banks.

=== Agriculture ===
The North 24 Parganas district Human Development Report opines that in spite of agricultural productivity in North 24 Parganas district being rather impressive 81.84% of rural population suffered from shortage of food. With a high urbanisation of 54.3% in 2001, the land use pattern in the district is changing quite fast and the area under cultivation is declining. However, agriculture is still the major source of livelihood in the rural areas of the district.

From 1977 on wards major land reforms took place in West Bengal. Land in excess of land ceiling was acquired and distributed amongst the peasants. Following land reforms land ownership pattern has undergone transformation. In 2010–11, persons engaged in agriculture in Swarupnagar CD Block could be classified as follows: bargadars 1,935 (3.57%), patta (document) holders 4,529 (8.36%), small farmers (possessing land between 1 and 2 hectares) 3,395 (6.27%), marginal farmers (possessing land up to 1 hectare) 18,710 (34.55%) and agricultural labourers 25,579 (47.24%).

Swarupnagar CD Block had 346 fertiliser depots, 178 seed stores and 54 fair price shops in 2010–11.

In 2010–11, Swarupnagar CD Block produced 20,013 tonnes of Aman paddy, the main winter crop from 8,769 hectares, 26,564 tonnes of Boro paddy (spring crop) from 8,122 hectares, 5,572 tonnes of Aus paddy (summer crop) from 2,121 hectares, 1,759 tonnes of wheat from 673 hectares, 119,890 tonnes of jute from 5,048 hectares and 40,692 tonnes of potatoes from 1,292 hectares. It also produced pulses and oilseeds.

In 2010–11, the total area irrigated in Swarupnagar CD Block was 1,180 hectares, out of which 987 hectares were irrigated with canal water, 100 hectares by tank water, 700 hectares by river lift irrigation, 244 hectares by deep tube well and 136 hectares by other means.

=== Pisciculture ===
In 2010–11, the net area under effective pisciculture in Swarupnagar CD Block was 2,945.24 hectares. 31,955 persons were engaged in the profession. Approximate annual production was 88,357.2 quintals.

=== Banking ===
In 2010–11, Swarupnagar CD Block had offices of 8 commercial banks and 3 gramin banks.

== Transport ==
In 2010–11, Swarupnagar CD Block had 5 ferry services and 6 originating/ terminating bus routes. The nearest railway station is Maslandapur 20 km from CD Block headquarters.

A local road links Swarupnagar with Basirhat.

== Education ==
In 2010–11, Swarupnagar CD Block had 144 primary schools with 15,137 students, 3 middle schools with 3,563 students, 13 high schools with 8.070 students and 9 higher secondary schools with 7,294 students. Swarupnagar CD Block had 1 general college with 2,421 students and 411 institutions for special and non-formal education with 17,011 students.

Saheed Nurul Islam Mahavidyalaya was established at Tentulia in 2001.

As per the 2011 census, in Swarupnagar CD Block, amongst the 65 inhabited villages, all villages had a school, 44 villages had more than 1 primary school, 35 villages had at least 1 primary and 1 middle school and 31 villages had at least 1 middle and 1 secondary school.

== Healthcare ==
In 2011, Swarupnagar CD Block had 1 rural hospital and 2 primary health centres, with total 31 beds and 7 doctors (excluding private bodies). It had 34 family welfare subcentres. 3,149 patients were treated indoors and 64,574 patients were treated outdoor in the hospitals, health centres and subcentres of the CD Block.

Sarapole (Sonarpur) Rural Hospital at Sarapole (Sarapul) with 30 beds functions as the main medical facility in Swarpnagar CD Block. There are primary health centres at Bankra (with 10 beds) and Charghat (with 10 beds).

Swarupnagar block is one of the areas where ground water is affected by arsenic contamination.
