= Chandpara =

- village
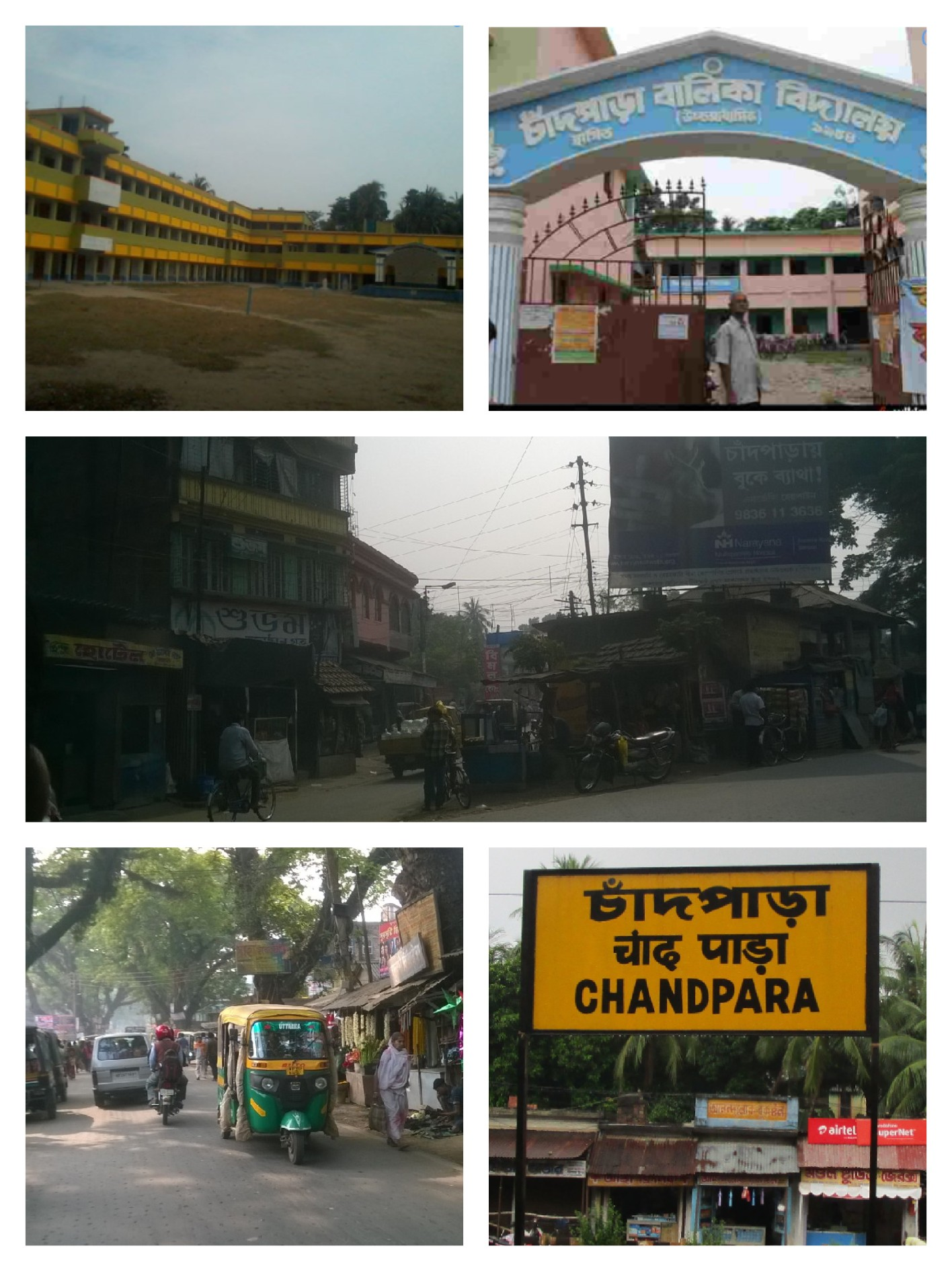
- Landmarks of Chandpara

- Location in West Bengal, India Chandpara (India)
- Coordinates: 22.970°N 88.782°E
- Country: India
- State: West Bengal
- District: North 24 Parganas
- Elevation: 10 m (33 ft)

Population (2011)
  - Total: 7,113

Languages
  - Official: Bengali, English
- Time zone: UTC+5:30 (IST)
- PIN: 743245
- Telephone code: 03215
- Vehicle registration: WB
- Lok Sabha constituency: Bangaon
- Vidhan Sabha constituency: Bangaon Dakshin

Chandpara is a Village in the Gaighata CD block in the Bangaon subdivision of the North 24 Parganas district in the state of West Bengal, India.

== Geography ==
Cities, towns and locations in Bangaon subdivision, North 24 Parganas district
M: municipal town, CT: census town, R: rural/ urban centre, T: place of tourist interest
Owing to space constraints in the small map, the actual locations in a larger map may vary slightly

=== Location ===
Chandpara is located at 22.978145°N 88.781532°E.

=== Area overview ===
The area shown in the map was a part of Jessore district from 1883. At the time of Partition of Bengal (1947) the Radcliffe Line placed the police station areas of Bangaon and Gaighata of Jessore district in India and the area was made a part of 24 Parganas district. The renowned novelist, Bibhutibhushan Bandopadhyay (of Pather Panchali fame) belonged to this area and many of his writings portray his experience in the area. It is a flat plain located in the lower Ganges Delta. In the densely populated area, 16.33% of the population lives in the urban areas and 83.67% lives in the rural areas.

Note: The map alongside presents some of the notable locations in the subdivision. All places marked in the map are linked in the larger full screen map.

== Civic administration ==
=== CD block HQ ===
The headquarters of Gaighata CD block are located at Chandpara Bazar.

== Demographics ==
According to the 2011 Census of India, Chandpara had a total population of 7,113, of which 3,655 (51%) were males and 3,458 (49%) were females. Population in the age range 0–6 years was 604. The total number of literate persons in Chandpara was 5,665 (87.03% of the population over 6 years).

== Transport ==
NH 112 (Jessore Road) passes through Chandpara.

Chandpara railway station is on the Sealdah-Bangaon line.

== Education ==
Chandpara Bani Vidhya Bithi[1] is a higher secondary school in Chandpara of North 24 Parganas district, West Bengal. Over 1,700 students are enrolled at this school. It was established in 1950. Established in 1950 with Late Mahendranath Ghosh as its founder Headmaster, Chandpara Bani Vidya Bithi (H.S.) School is one of the pioneering institutions in Gaighata East Circle. The chair of the Head of the institution was also graced by the august presence of Late Keshablal Biswas (TIC), Sri Ramesh Chandra Biswas (HM), Sri Nikhil Kumar Das (TIC)

Dhakuria High School at Chandpara is a Bengali medium boys only higher secondary school established in 1954. It has arrangements for teaching from class V to class XII. It has its own play ground.

Chandpara Balika Vidyalaya at Chandpara is a Bengali-medium girls only higher secondary school established in 1954. It has arrangements for teaching from class VI to class XII. It has its own play ground.

=== College ===
- Gaighata Government Polytechnic

== Healthcare ==
Chandpara Rural Hospital with 30 beds is the main medical facility in Gaighata CD Block. There are primary health centres at Gaighata (with 6 beds), Dharampur (with 6 beds), Ramchandrapur (Baduria PHC with 10 beds) and Ghonja (Dr. B.R.Roy PHC with 6 beds).
