= Bagdah (community development block) =

- Community development block
- Interactive map of Bagdah
- Coordinates: 23.22°N 88.88°E
- Country: India
- State: West Bengal
- District: North 24 Parganas

Government
  - Type: Representative democracy
  - MLA: Soma Thakur (BJP)

Area
  - Total: 233.47 km^{2} (90.14 sq mi)
- Elevation: 13 m (43 ft)

Population (2011)
  - Total: 242,974
  - Density: 1,040.7/km^{2} (2,695.4/sq mi)

Languages
  - Official: Bengali, English

Literacy (2011)
  - Total literates: 164,283 (75.30%)
- Time zone: UTC+5:30 (IST)
- PIN: 743232 (Bagdah); 743297 (Sindrani); 743270 (Helencha Colony)
- Telephone/STD code: 03215
- ISO 3166 code: IN-WB
- Vehicle registration: WB-23, WB-24, WB-25, WB-26
- Lok Sabha constituency: Bangaon
- Vidhan Sabha constituency: Bagda
- Website: north24parganas.nic.in

Bagdah (also spelled Bagda) is a community development block that forms an administrative division in Bangaon subdivision of North 24 Parganas district in the Indian state of West Bengal.

== Geography ==
Bagdah is located at 23°13′N 88°53′E.

Bagdah CD Block is bounded by Maheshpur Upazila in Jhenaidaha District, Chaugachha Upazila and Sharsha Upazila in Jessore District of Bangladesh in the north and east, Bangaon CD Block in the south and Hanskhali and Ranaghat II CD Blocks in Nadia district in the west.

Bagdah CD Block is part of the Ichhamati-Raimangal Plain, one of the three physiographic regions in the district located in the lower Ganges Delta. It contains soil of mature black or brownish loam to recent alluvium. The Ichhamati flows through the eastern part of the district. The Ichhamati, Kodara and Betna flow through this block.

Bagdah CD Block has an area of 233.47 km^{2}. It has 1 panchayat samity, 9 gram panchayats, 140 gram sansads (village councils), 108 mouzas and 106 inhabited villages. Bagdah police station serves this block. Headquarters of this CD Block is at Bagdah.

Gram panchayats of Bagdah block/ panchayat samiti are: Asharu, Helencha, Malipota, Bagda, Koniara I, Ranghat, Bayra, Koniara II and Sindrani.

== Demographics ==
=== Population ===
As per 2011 Census of India, Bagda CD Block had a total population of 242,974, all of it rural. There were 125,270 (52%) males and 117,704 (48%) females. Population below 6 years was 24,801. Scheduled Castes numbered 133,170 (54.81%) and Scheduled Tribes numbered 12,960 (5.33%).

At the time of the 2001 census, Bagdah block had a total population of 219,812 out of which 112,595 were males and 107,217 were females.

Large villages in Bagdah CD Block (2011 census figures in brackets): Sindrani (9,811), Char Mandalbhag (8,456), Mathabhanga (4,115), Khordda Kulbaria (4,004), Bagdah (6,424), Mamabhagina (5,144), Helencha (6,375), Karanga (4,398), Parmadan (6,087), Godpukuria (4,586) and Gobindapur (4,525).

North 24 Parganas district is densely populated, mainly because of the influx of refugees from East Pakistan (later Bangladesh). With a density of population of 2,182 per km^{2} in 1971, it was 3rd in terms of density per km^{2} in West Bengal after Kolkata and Howrah, and 20th in India. According to the District Human Development Report: North 24 Parganas, “High density is also explained partly by the rapid growth of urbanization in the district. In 1991, the percentage of urban population in the district has been 51.23.”

Decadal Population Growth Rate (%)

The decadal growth of population in Bagdah CD Block in 2001-2011 was 10.54%. The decadal growth of population in Bagdah CD Block in 1991-2001 was 15.27%.

The decadal growth rate of population in North 24 Parganas district was as follows: 47.9% in 1951-61, 34.5% in 1961-71, 31.4% in 1971-81, 31.7% in 1981-91, 22.7% in 1991-2001 and 12.0% in 2001-11. The decadal growth rate for West Bengal in 2001-11 was 13.93%. The decadal growth rate for West Bengal was 17.84% in 1991-2001, 24.73% in 1981-1991 and 23.17% in 1971-1981.

Only a small portion of the border with Bangladesh has been fenced and it is popularly referred to as a porous border. It is freely used by Bangladeshi infiltrators, terrorists, smugglers, criminals, et al.

=== Literacy ===
As per the 2011 census, the total number of literates in Bagdah CD Block was 164,283 (75.30% of the population over 6 years) out of which males numbered 90,492 (80.31% of the male population over 6 years) and females numbered 73,791 (69.65% of the female population over 6 years). The gender disparity (the difference between female and male literacy rates) was 10.36%.

See also – List of West Bengal districts ranked by literacy rate

Literacy in CD blocks of
North 24 Parganas district
Barasat Sadar subdivision
Amdanga – 80.69%
Deganga – 79.65%
Barasat I – 81.50%
Barasat II – 77.71%
Habra I – 83.15%
Habra II – 81.05%
Rajarhat – 83.13%
Basirhat subdivision
Baduria – 78.75%
Basirhat I – 72.10%
Basirhat II – 78.30%
Haroa – 73.13%
Hasnabad – 71.47%
Hingalganj – 76.85%
Minakhan – 71.33%
Sandeshkhali I – 71.08%
Sandeshkhali II – 70.96%
Swarupnagar – 77.57%
Bangaon subdivision
Bagdah – 75.30%
Bangaon – 79.71%
Gaighata – 82.32%
Barrackpore subdivision
Barrackpore I – 85.91%
Barrackpore II – 84.53%
Source: 2011 Census: CD Block Wise
Primary Census Abstract Data

=== Language and religion ===
Religion in Bagda CD block (2011)
Hinduism	82.00%
Islam	17.42%
Other or not stated	0.58%

In the 2011 census Hindus numbered 199,249 and formed 82.00% of the population in Bagda CD Block. Muslims numbered 42,318 and formed 17.42% of the population. Others numbered 1,407 and formed 0.58% of the population.

In 1981 Hindus numbered 116,584 and formed 82.1% of the population and Muslims numbered 25,011 and formed 17.61% of the population. In 1991 Hindus numbered 159,301 and formed 83.51% of the population and Muslims numbered 30,969 and formed 16.24% of the population in Bagada CD Block. (In 1981 and 1991 census was conducted as per jurisdiction of the police station). In 2001 in Bagda CD block, Hindus were 180,865 (82.28%) and Muslims 37,676 (17.14%).

Languages of Bagda CD block (2011)
1. Bengali (98.5%)
2. Sadri (1.24%)
3. Others (0.26%)

At the time of the 2011 census, 98.50% of the population spoke Bengali and 1.24% Sadri as their first language.

== Rural Poverty ==
14.76% of households in Bagdah CD Block lived below poverty line in 2001, against an average of 29.28% in North 24 Parganas district.

== Economy ==
=== Livelihood ===
Livelihood
in Bagdah CD Block
1. Cultivators (24.9%)
2. Agricultural labourers (42.0%)
3. Household industries (5.37%)
4. Other Workers (27.7%)

In Bagdah CD Block in 2011, amongst the class of total workers, cultivators numbered 23,355 and formed 24.92% of the total workers, agricultural labourers numbered 39,348 and formed 41.99%, household industry workers numbered 5,031 and formed 5.37% and other workers numbered 25,975 and formed 27.72%. Total workers numbered 93,709 and formed 38.57% of the total population, and non-workers numbered 149,265 and formed 61.43% of the population.

In more than 30 percent of the villages in North 24 Parganas, agriculture or household industry is no longer the major source of livelihood for the main workers there. The CD Blocks in the district can be classified as belonging to three categories: border areas, Sundarbans area and other rural areas. The percentage of other workers in the other rural areas category is considerably higher than those in the border areas and Sundarbans areas.

Note: In the census records a person is considered a cultivator, if the person is engaged in cultivation/ supervision of land owned by self/government/institution. When a person who works on another person's land for wages in cash or kind or share, is regarded as an agricultural labourer. Household industry is defined as an industry conducted by one or more members of the family within the household or village, and one that does not qualify for registration as a factory under the Factories Act. Other workers are persons engaged in some economic activity other than cultivators, agricultural labourers and household workers. It includes factory, mining, plantation, transport and office workers, those engaged in business and commerce, teachers, entertainment artistes and so on.

=== Infrastructure ===
There are 106 inhabited villages in Bagdah CD Block. 100% villages have power supply and drinking water supply. 29 villages (27.36%) have post offices. 97 villages (91.51%) have telephones (including landlines, public call offices and mobile phones). 58 villages (54.72%) have a pucca approach road and 48 villages (45.28%) have transport communication (includes bus service, rail facility and navigable waterways). 15 villages (14.15%) have agricultural credit societies and 20 villages (18.87%) have banks.

=== Agriculture ===
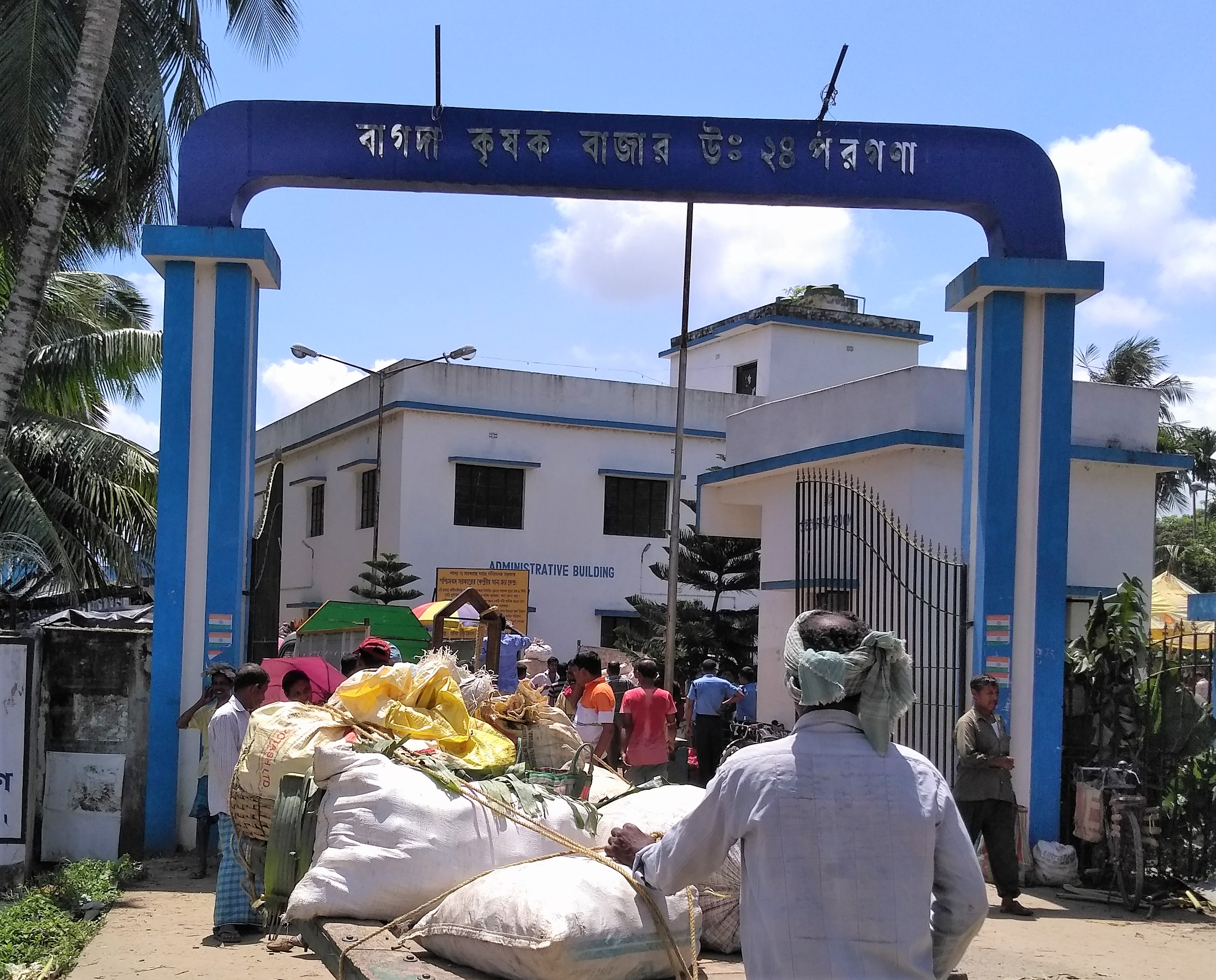
Bagdah APMC Mandi entrance.

The North 24 Parganas district Human Development Report opines that in spite of agricultural productivity in North 24 Parganas district being rather impressive 81.84% of rural population suffered from shortage of food. With a high urbanisation of 54.3% in 2001, the land use pattern in the district is changing quite fast and the area under cultivation is declining. However, agriculture is still the major source of livelihood in the rural areas of the district.

From 1977 on wards major land reforms took place in West Bengal. Land in excess of land ceiling was acquired and distributed amongst the peasants. Following land reforms land ownership pattern has undergone transformation. In 2010-11, persons engaged in agriculture in Bagdah CD Block could be classified as follows: bargadars 2,036 (3.33%), patta (document) holders 6,863 (11.21%), small farmers (possessing land between 1 and 2 hectares) 3,250 (5.31%), marginal farmers (possessing land up to 1 hectare) 21,065 (34.41%) and agricultural labourers 28,007 (45.75%).

Bagdah CD Block had 3 fertiliser depots and 4 seed stores in 2010-11.

In 2010-11, Bagdah CD Block produced 21,664 tonnes of Aman paddy, the main winter crop from 8,318 hectares, 32,787 tonnes of Boro paddy (spring crop) from 8,160 hectares, 4,081 tonnes of Aus paddy (summer crop) from 2,055 hectares, 1,178 tonnes of wheat from 395 hectares, 80,468 tonnes of jute from 4,310 hectares, 12,557 tonnes of potatoes from 402 hectares and 1,380 tonnes of sugar cane from 17 hectares. It also produced pulses and oilseeds.

In 2010-11, the total area irrigated in Bagdah CD Block was 4,773 hectares, out of which 940 hectares were irrigated with river lift irrigation, 736 hectares by deep tube well, 150 hectares by shallow tube well and 2,947 hectares by other means.

=== Pisciculture ===
In 2010-11, the net area under effective pisciculture in Bagdah CD Block was 2,319.89 hectares. 38,906 persons were engaged in the profession. Approximate annual production was 69,596.7 quintals.

=== Banking ===
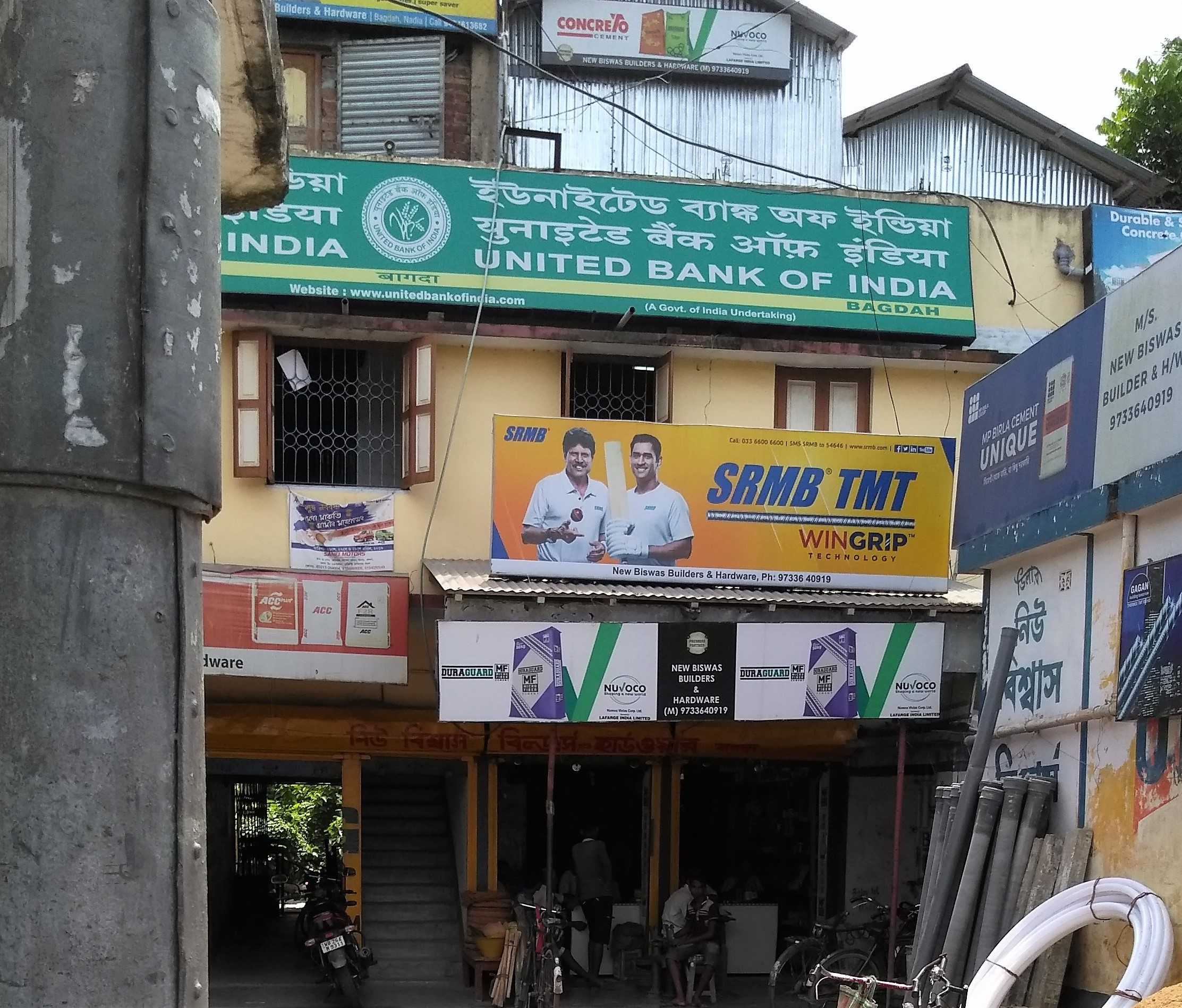
Bagdah UBI bank front

In 2017-18, Bagdah CD Block had offices of 4 commercial banks and 5 gramin banks. Punjab National Bank (formerly United Bank of India), the main commercial bank of the block, has its two branches at Bagdah and Kurulia Wjile State Bank of India has its branch opened in Bagdah in 2026.

== Transport ==
In 2010-11, Bagdah CD Block had 2 ferry services and 6 originating/ terminating bus routes. The nearest railway station is 26 km from the CD Block headquarters.

SH 3 passes connects Bangaon with Krishnanagar via Helencha. PWD road run up to border village Boyra linking Bagdah with Bangaon and Krishnanagar via Helencha.

=== Bus Services ===
Following Bus services are available from the sub-division headquarter to different areas.

- From Bongaon to Boyra, Duttaphulia, Beyara/Harinathpur, Malidah (via Asharu) etc.
- State Govt owned West Bengal Transport Corporation (WBTC) runs 2 services to and from
  - D7 Bagdah—Barasat
  - D7/1 Bagdah— Howrah
- Few private bus services operates direct bus services to and from
  - Boyra—Ranaghat
  - Bagdah—Digha

== Education ==
In 2010-11, Bagdah CD Block had 132 primary schools with 13,408 students, 9 high schools with 5,092 students and 16 higher secondary schools with 25,067 students. Bagdah CD Block had 1 general degree college (Dr. B. R. Ambedkar Satabarshiki Mahavidyalaya, Helencha) with 1,044 students, 1 professional/ technical institution with 40 students and 443 institutions for special and non-formal education with 14,303 students.

As per the 2011 census, in Bagdah CD Block, amongst the 106 inhabited villages, 1 village did not have a school, 50 villages had more than 1 primary school, 38 villages had at least 1 primary and 1 middle school and 32 villages had at least 1 middle and 1 secondary school.

== Healthcare ==
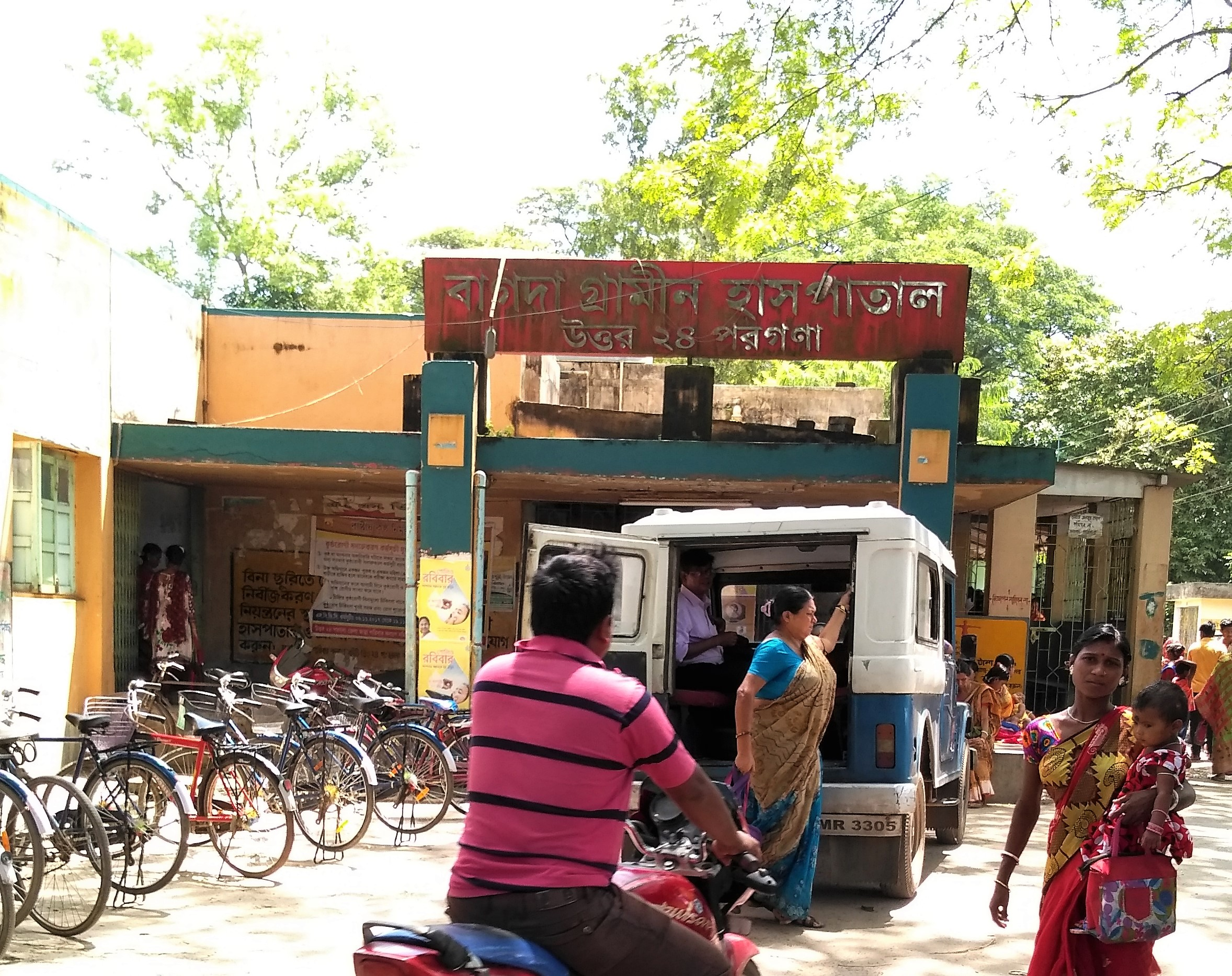
Bagdah Rural Hospital main entry

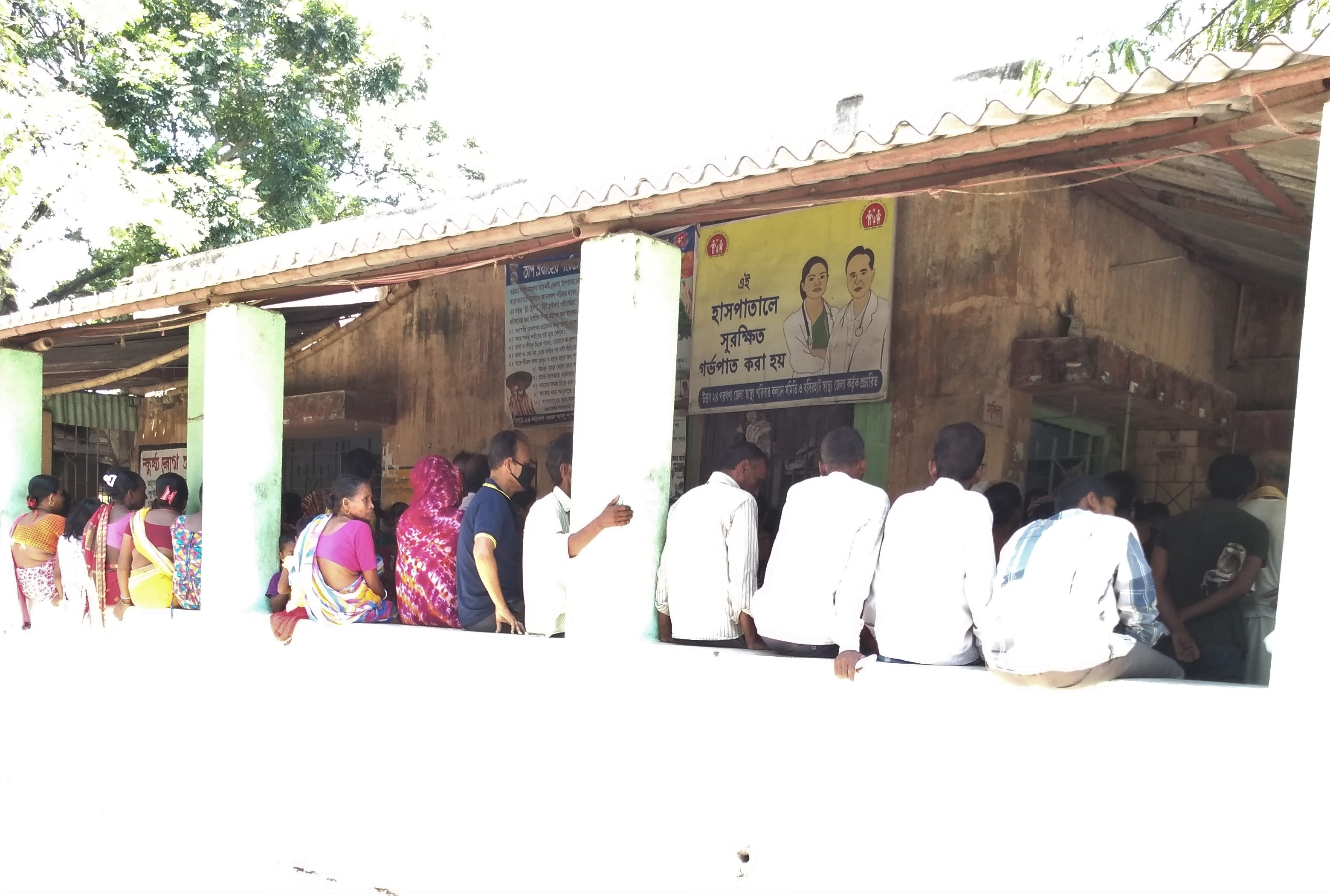
Bagdah Hospital patients are at the outdoor queue for treatment

In 2011, Bagdah CD Block had 1 rural hospital and 3 primary health centres, with total 52 beds and 9 doctors (excluding private bodies). It had 35 family welfare subcentres. 3, 538 patients were treated indoor and 50,002 patients were treated outdoor in the hospitals, health centres and subcentres of the CD Block.

Bagdah Rural Hospital at Bagda with 30 beds is the main medical facility in Bagdah CD Block. There are primary health centres at Mangalganj (Nataberia PHC with 6 beds), Sindrani (with 10 beds) and Bena (Koniera PHC with 6 beds).

Bagdah block is one of the areas where ground water is affected by arsenic contamination.
