= Harichand Guruchand University =

University in India

Coordinates: 22.9843°N 88.7809°E

- Motto: Knowledge is power
- Type: Public
- Established: 11 January 2019; 7 years ago
- Affiliations: UGC
- Chancellor: Governor of West Bengal
- Vice-Chancellor: Nimai Chandra Saha
- Location: Gaighata, North 24 Parganas district, West Bengal, India
- Website: harichandguruchanduniversity.ac.in

Harichand Guruchand University is a public university, located in Thakurnagar, Gaighata, North 24 Parganas district, West Bengal, India.

== History ==
The university was established in 2018 as Harichand Guruchand University under The Harichand Guruchand University Act. It started its educational programme with the appointment of the first vice-chancellor, Tapan Kumar Biswas, in January 2021.

At the initial stage, until the completion of new university buildings, all administrative works and physical teaching programme were operated from P. R. Thakur Government College building, located adjacent to the university. In November 2021, the university started its online teaching programme due to the COVID-19 pandemic.

== Faculties and Departments ==
- Faculty of arts
  - Department of Bengali,
  - Department of Education,
  - Department of History
  - Department of Journalism and Mass Communication
  - Department of Rural Development (Upcoming)
  - Department of Yoga Education (Upcoming)

== Notable faculty ==
- Tapan Kumar Biswas

== See also ==
- List of universities in West Bengal
- Education in India
- Education in West Bengal
