= Panchita =

- Village
- Location in West Bengal, India Panchita (India)
- Coordinates: 23°6′24″N 88°49′13″E
- Country: India
- State: West Bengal
- District: North 24 Parganas

Population (2011)
  - Total: 5,148

Languages
  - Official: Bengali, English
- Time zone: UTC+5:30 (IST)
- PIN: 743235 (Dharmmapukuria)
- Telephone/STD code: 03215
- Lok Sabha constituency: Bangaon
- Vidhan Sabha constituency: Bangaon Uttar
- Website: north24parganas.nic.in

Panchita is a village in Bangaon CD Block in Bangaon subdivision of North 24 Parganas district in the state of West Bengal, India.

== Demographics ==
According to the 2011 Census of India, Panchita had a total population of 5,148, of which 2,703 were males and 2,445 were females.

== Education ==
There is one high school called Chanda Lalit Mohan High School and four primary schools in Panchita.

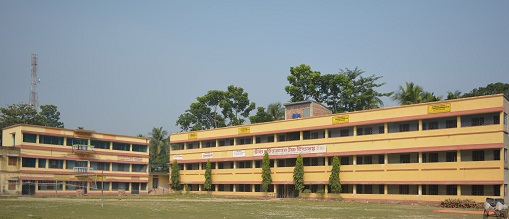
