= Dhakuria, North 24 Parganas =

Dhakuria
- Census Town
- Location in West Bengal, India Dhakuria (India)
- Coordinates: 22.96°N 88.79°E
- Country: India
- State: West Bengal
- District: South 24 Parganas

Population (2011)
  - Total: 10,165

Languages
  - Official: Bengali, English
- Time zone: UTC+5:30 (IST)
- ISO 3166 code: IN-WB
- Vehicle registration: WB
- Website: south24parganas.nic.in

Dhakuria is a census town in Gaighata CD Block in Bangaon subdivision in South 24 Parganas district in the state of West Bengal, India.

== Geography ==
Cities, towns and locations in Bangaon subdivision, South 24 Parganas district
M: municipal town, CT: census town, R: rural/ urban centre, T: place of tourist interest
Owing to space constraints in the small map, the actual locations in a larger map may vary slightly

=== Location ===
Dhakuria is located at 22.96°N 88.79°E. It is located in Gaighata community development block under Bangaon subdivision of South 24 Parganas district. This town is part of Gaighata Police Station.

=== Area overview ===
The area shown in the map was a part of Jessore district from 1883. At the time of Partition of Bengal (1947) the Radcliffe Line placed the police station areas of Bangaon and Gaighata of Jessore district in India and the area was made a part of 24 Parganas district. The renowned novelist, Bibhutibhushan Bandopadhyay (of Pather Panchali fame) belonged to this area and many of his writings portray his experience in the area. It is a flat plain located in the lower Ganges Delta. In the densely populated area, 16.33% of the population lives in the urban areas and 83.67% lives in the rural areas.

Note: The map alongside presents some of the notable locations in the subdivision. All places marked in the map are linked in the larger full screen map.

== Demographics ==
As per 2011 Census of India Dhakuria had a total population of 10,165, of which 5,054 (50%) were males and 5,111 (50%) were females. Population below 6 years was 836. The total number of literates in Dhakuria was 7,849 (84.14% of the population over 6 years).

As of 2001 India census, Dhakuria had a population of 8842. Males constitute 51% of the population and females 49%. Dhakuria has an average literacy rate of 71%, higher than the national average of 59.5%: male literacy is 76% and, female literacy is 65%. In Dhakuria, 12% of the population is under 6 years of age.
