= Chikanpara =

- Census Town
- Location in West Bengal, India Chikanpara (India)
- Coordinates: 22.936231°N 88.771246°E
- Country: India
- State: West Bengal
- District: North 24 Parganas

Population (2011)
  - Total: 9,594

Languages
  - Official: Bengali, English
- Time zone: UTC+5:30 (IST)
- PIN: 743287
- Vehicle registration: WB
- MLA: Phulin Bihary Roy
- Website: north24parganas.nic.in

Chikanpara is a census town in the Gaighata CD block in the Bangaon subdivision of the North 24 Parganas district in state of West Bengal, India.

== Geography ==
Cities, towns and locations in Bangaon subdivision, North 24 Parganas district
M: municipal town, CT: census town, R: rural/ urban centre, T: place of tourist interest
Owing to space constraints in the small map, the actual locations in a larger map may vary slightly

=== Location ===
Chikanpara is bounded by Katakhali and Ganti villages on the north, Shimulpur census town on the east, Karola village on the south, and Gutri, Kaya, Pansila and Hudasimulpur villages on the west. Thakurnagar has not been identified as a separate location in 2011 census.

=== Area overview ===
The area shown in the map was a part of Jessore district from 1883. At the time of Partition of Bengal (1947) the Radcliffe Line placed the police station areas of Bangaon and Gaighata of Jessore district in India and the area was made a part of 24 Parganas district. The renowned novelist, Bibhutibhushan Bandopadhyay (of Pather Panchali fame) belonged to this area and many of his writings portray his experience in the area. It is a flat plain located in the lower Ganges Delta. In the densely populated area, 16.33% of the population lives in the urban areas and 83.67% lives in the rural areas.

Note: The map alongside presents some of the notable locations in the subdivision. All places marked in the map are linked in the larger full screen map.

== Demographics ==
According to the 2011 Census of India, Chikanpara had a total population of 9,594, of which 4,784 (50%) were males and 4,810 (50%) were females. The population in the age range 0–6 years was 760. The total number of literate persons in Chikanpara was 8,058 (91.22% of the population over 6 years).

== Education ==
P. R. Thakur Government College, Thakurnagar High School and Thakurnagar Girls High School at Thakurnagar are located nearby.
