= Sonatikiri =

- Census Town
- Location in West Bengal, India Sonatikiri (India)
- Coordinates: 22.68°N 88.59°E
- Country: India
- State: West Bengal
- District: North 24 Parganas
- Elevation: 11 m (36 ft)

Population (2011)
  - Total: 6,919

Languages
  - Official: Bengali, English
- Time zone: UTC+5:30 (IST)
- ISO 3166 code: IN-WB
- Vehicle registration: WB
- Website: north24parganas.nic.in

Sonatikiri is a census town in the Gaighata CD block of the Bangaon subdivision in North 24 Parganas district in the Indian state of West Bengal.

== Geography ==
Cities, towns and locations in Bangaon subdivision, North 24 Parganas district
M: municipal town, CT: census town, R: rural/ urban centre, T: place of tourist interest
Owing to space constraints in the small map, the actual locations in a larger map may vary slightly

=== Location ===
Sonatikiri is located at 22.68°N 88.59°E. It has an average elevation of 11 m (36 ft).

Nearest towns- Thakurnagar, Chandpara, Gonardanga.

=== Area overview ===
The area shown in the map was a part of Jessore district from 1884. At the time of Partition of Bengal (1947) the Radcliffe Line placed the police station areas of Bangaon and Gaighata of Jessore district in India and the area was made a part of 24 Parganas district. The novelist Bibhutibhushan Bandopadhyay (Pather Panchali) belonged to this area and many of his writings portray his experience in the area. It is a flat plain located in the lower Ganges Delta. In the densely populated area, 16.33% of the population lives in the urban areas and 83.67% lives in the rural areas.

Note: The map alongside presents some of the notable locations in the subdivision. All places marked in the map are linked in the larger full screen map.

== Demographics ==
According to the 2011 Census of India, Sonatiikri had a total population of 6,919, of which 3,500 (51%) were males and 3,419 (49%) were females. Population in the age range 0–6 years was 531. The total number of literate persons in Sonatikri was 5,845 (91.5% of the population over 6 years).

As of 2001 India census, Sonatikiri had a population of 6628. Males constitute 51% of the population and females 49%. Sonatikiri has an average literacy rate of 75%, higher than the national average of 59.5%: male literacy is 79%, and female literacy is 70%. In Sonatikiri, 10% of the population is under 6 years of age.

== Healthcare ==
North 24 Parganas district has been identified as one of the areas where ground water is affected by arsenic contamination.
