= Helencha =

Village in Bagdah, North 24 Parganas, West Bengal, India, Asia

- Village
- Location in West Bengal, India Helencha (India)
- Coordinates: 23.188732°N 88.860234°E
- Country: India
- State: West Bengal
- District: North 24 Parganas

Government
  - MLA: Biswajit Das (BJP)

Population (2011)
  - Total: 6,424

Languages
  - Official: Bengali, English
- Time zone: UTC+5:30 (IST)
- PIN: 743270 (Helencha Colony)
- Telephone/STD code: 03215
- Lok Sabha constituency: Bangaon
- Vidhan Sabha constituency: Bagdah
- Website: north24parganas.nic.in

Helencha is a village in the Bagdah CD block in the Bangaon subdivision of the North 24 Parganas district in the state of West Bengal, India.

== Geography ==
Cities, towns and locations in Bangaon subdivision, North 24 Parganas district
M: municipal town, CT: census town, R: rural/ urban centre, T: place of tourist interest
Owing to space constraints in the small map, the actual locations in a larger map may vary slightly

=== Location ===
Helencha is located at 23.188732°N 88.860234°E.

=== Area overview ===
The area shown in the map was a part of Jessore district from 1883. At the time of Partition of Bengal (1947) the Radcliffe Line placed the police station areas of Bangaon and Gaighata of Jessore district in India and the area was made a part of 24 Parganas district. The renowned novelist, Bibhutibhushan Bandopadhyay (of Pather Panchali fame) belonged to this area and many of his writings portray his experience in the area. It is a flat plain located in the lower Ganges Delta. In the densely populated area, 16.33% of the population lives in the urban areas and 83.67% lives in the rural areas.

Note: The map alongside presents some of the notable locations in the subdivision. All places marked in the map are linked in the larger full screen map.

== Civic administration ==
=== Police station ===
Bagdah police station is located at Helencha. It covers an area of 233.055 km^{2} and serves a population of 242,674. Bagda police district has a 53 km land border and 5 km riverine border. 5 km of the border is unfenced. It has jurisdiction over Bagdah CD block.

=== Gram Panchayat ===
Gram Panchayat is the local self government institution at the Village. It is located near the Bagdah Police Station, on the way of Helencha - Duttapulia Road.

== Demographics ==
According to the 2011 Census of India, Helencha had a total population of 6,375, of which 3,331 (52%) were males and 3,044 (49%) were females. Population in the age range 0–6 years was 578. The total number of literate persons in Helencha was 4,848 (83.63% of the population over 6 years).

Maximum of the population belongs to Namasudra Hindu community. There also a large number of Muslim community co-exist.

== Economy ==
Helencha Bazar is the main market in the locality. Shopping Mall, many shops exist there. A large vegetable market sits on every Sunday and Wednesday. From there vegetable are export nearby towns including Kolkata and Barasat. There has many banks branch including State Bank of India, Indian Bank, Punjab National Bank.

== Transport ==
NH 312 runs through Helencha with subdivisional headquarter Bangaon and Krishnanagar, the district headquarter of Nadia district via Duttaphulia and Bagula.

== Education ==
Dr. B. R. Ambedkar Satabarshiki Mahavidyalaya is a general degree college, affiliated to the West Bengal State University. It offers honours courses in Bengali, Sanskrit and Political Science, and a general BA course. It was established in 2005.

Helencha High School is a boys only Bengali-medium school. It was established in 1953.

Helencha Girls High School is a girls only Bengali-medium higher secondary school. It was established in 1958.

Harichand Guruchand Thakur Government ITI College. It was established in 2016

Vidyasagar Model High School is a Bengali-medium private school. It is established in 2003
