= Nahata =

- Village
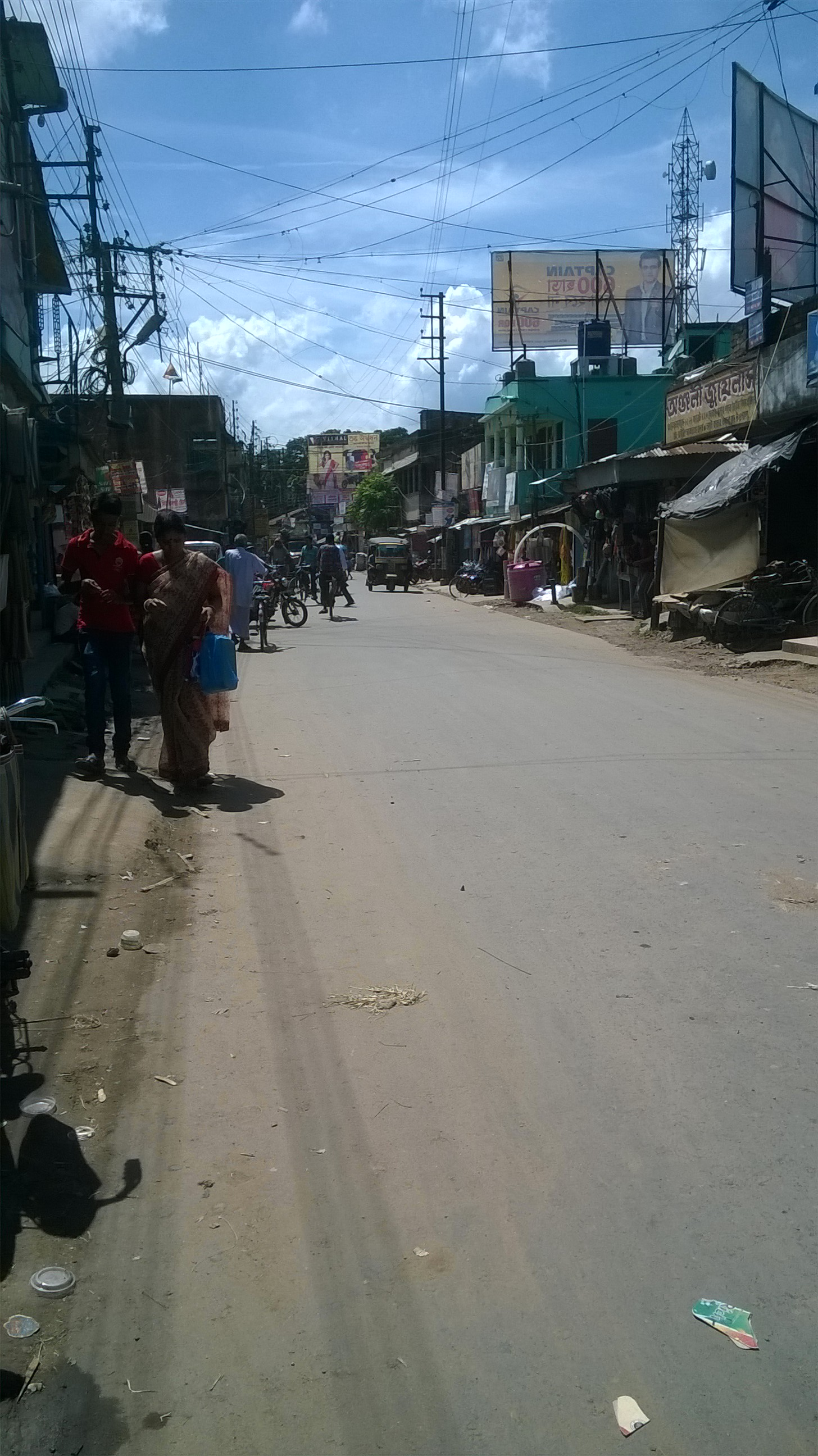
- Bazar of Nahata

- Location within West Bengal Location within India
- Coordinates: 22.986609°N 88.701719°E
- Country: India
- State: West Bengal
- District: North 24 Parganas
- Elevation: 10 m (33 ft)
- Time zone: UTC+5:30 (Indian Standard Time)
- PIN: 743290
- Telephone/STD code: 03215
- Lok Sabha constituency: Bangaon
- Vidhan Sabha constituency: Bangaon Dakshin
- Website: north24parganas.nic.in

Nahata is a village in the Bangaon CD Block in the Bangaon subdivision of the North 24 Parganas, West Bengal.

== Geography ==
Cities, towns and locations in Bangaon subdivision, North 24 Parganas district
M: municipal town, CT: census town, R: rural/ urban centre, T: place of tourist interest
Owing to space constraints in the small map, the actual locations in a larger map may vary slightly

=== Location ===
Nahata is located at 22.986609°N 88.701719°E.

=== Area overview ===
The area shown in the map was a part of Jessore district from 1883. At the time of Partition of Bengal (1947) the Radcliffe Line placed the police station areas of Bangaon and Gaighata of Jessore district in India and the area was made a part of 24 Parganas district. The renowned novelist, Bibhutibhushan Bandopadhyay (of Pather Panchali fame) belonged to this area and many of his writings portray his experience in the area. It is a flat plain located in the lower Ganges Delta. In the densely populated area, 16.33% of the population lives in the urban areas and 83.67% lives in the rural areas.

Note: The map alongside presents some of the notable locations in the subdivision. All places marked in the map are linked in the larger full screen map.

== Demographics ==
In the 2011 census Nahata is not identified as a separate location. However, in the Bangaon CD block map in the District Census Handbook, there is an indication that it is part of Village No. 322666 Ichhlampur.

According to the 2011 Census of India, Ichhlampur had a total population of 6.886, of which 3,532 (51%) were males and 3,354 (49%) were females. Population in the age range 0–6 years was 616. The total number of literate persons in Ichhlampur was 5,261 (83.91% of the population over 6 years).

== Education ==
Nahata Jogendranath Mandal Smriti Mahavidyalaya was established at Nahata in 1985. Affiliated with the West Bengal State University, it offers honours courses in Bengali, English, history, political science, education and geography, and a general course in arts.

Nahata High School is a Bengali-medium boys only high school teaching up to Class XII. It was established in 1949. It has 15 computers. The pass percentage is 96.00 and 40% of the students secure first division.
