= Gaighata =

- Community development block
- Interactive map of Gaighata
- Coordinates: 22.93°N 88.73°E
- Country: India
- State: West Bengal
- District: North 24 Parganas

Government
  - Type: Representative democracy
  - MLA: Subrata Thakur (Bharatiya Janata Party)

Area
  - Total: 240.30 km^{2} (92.78 sq mi)
- Elevation: 12 m (39 ft)

Population (2011)
  - Total: 330,287
  - Density: 1,374.5/km^{2} (3,559.9/sq mi)

Languages
  - Official: Bengali, English

Literacy (2011)
  - Total literates: 247,838 (82.32%)
- Time zone: UTC+5:30 (IST)
- PIN: 743249 (Gaighata); 743245 (Chandpara Bazar) Thakurnagar-743287
- Telephone/STD code: 03216
- ISO 3166 code: IN-WB
- Vehicle registration: WB-23, WB-24, WB-25, WB-26
- Lok Sabha constituency: Bangaon
- Vidhan Sabha constituency: Gaighata, Bangaon Dakshin
- Nearest Town: Thakurnagar, Chandpara
- Website: north24parganas.nic.in

Gaighata is a community development block that forms an administrative division in Bangaon subdivision of North 24 Parganas district in the Indian state of West Bengal.

== Geography ==
Situated on the banks of the river Jamuna, Gaighata is located at 22°56′N 88°44′E.

Gaighata CD Block is bounded by Bangaon CD Block in the north, Sharsha Upazila in Jessore District of Bangladesh in the east, Swarupnagar and Habra I CD Blocks in the south and Haringhata CD Block in Nadia district in the west.

Gaighata CD Block is part of the Ichhamati-Raimangal Plain, one of the three physiographic regions in the district located in the lower Ganges Delta. It contains soil of mature black or brownish loam to recent alluvium. The Ichhamati flows through the eastern part of the district.

Gaighata CD Block has an area of 243.30 km^{2}. It has 1 panchayat samity, 13 gram panchayats, 201 gram sansads (village councils), 105 mouzas and 105 inhabited villages, as per the District Statistical Handbook: North 24 Parganas. Gaighata police station serves this block. Headquarters of this CD Block is at Chandpara Bazar.

Gram panchayats of Gaighata block/ panchayat samiti are: Chandpara, Fulsara, Jaleswar II, Sutia, Dharmapur I, Ichapur I, Jhaudanga, Dharmapur II, Ichapur II, Ramnagar, Duma, Jaleswar I and Shimulpur.

== Demographics ==
=== Population ===
As per 2011 Census of India Gaighata CD Block had a total population of 330,287, of which 265,526 were rural and 64,761 were urban. There were 169,216 (51%) males and 161,071 (49%) females. Population below 6 years was 29,228. Scheduled Castes numbered 162,281 (49.13%) and Scheduled Tribes numbered 14,432 (1.76%).

As per 2001 census, Gaighata block has a total population of 300,418 out of which 177,515 were males and 166,459 were females.

Census towns in Gaighata CD Block were (2011 census figures in brackets): Chandpara,(7,113), Chhekati (4,995), Sonatikiri (6,919), Dhakuria (10,165), Chikanpara (9,594), Shimulpur (20,803) and Bara (5,172).

Large villages in Gaighata CD block were (2011 census figures in brackets): Hanspur (4,113), Patabuka (4,845), Dharmpur (5,090), Jaleshwar (5,602), Narikela (5,222), Rampur (6,936), Ichhapur (5,999), Karola (4,127), Bagchara (5,745), Phulsara (8,716), Mondalpara (5,607), Angrail (6,978), Barnagaria (4,789), Bishnupur (4,119), Barasat (7,441), Panchpota (8,312) and Ramnagar (4,521). (Thakurnagar is not identified as a place in 2011 census data).

Other villages in Gaighata CD block include (2011census figures in brackets): Gaighata (3,878) and Manikhira (2,898).

North 24 Parganas district is densely populated, mainly because of the influx of refugees from East Pakistan (later Bangladesh). With a density of population of 2,182 per km^{2} in 1971, it was 3rd in terms of density per km^{2} in West Bengal after Kolkata and Howrah, and 20th in India. According to the District Human Development Report: North 24 Parganas, “High density is also explained partly by the rapid growth of urbanization in the district. In 1991, the percentage of urban population in the district has been 51.23.”

Decadal Population Growth Rate (%)

The decadal growth of population in Gaighata CD Block in 2001-2011 was 9.88%. The decadal growth of population in Gaighata CD Block in 1991-2001 was 16.79%.

The decadal growth rate of population in North 24 Parganas district was as follows: 47.9% in 1951-61, 34.5% in 1961-71, 31.4% in 1971-81, 31.7% in 1981-91, 22.7% in 1991-2001 and 12.0% in 2001-11. The decadal growth rate for West Bengal in 2001-11 was 13.93%. The decadal growth rate for West Bengal was 17.84% in 1991-2001, 24.73% in 1981-1991 and 23.17% in 1971-1981.

Only a small portion of the border with Bangladesh has been fenced and it is popularly referred to as a porous border. It is freely used by Bangladeshi infiltrators, terrorists, smugglers, criminals, et al.

=== Literacy ===
As per the 2011 census, the total number of literates in Gaighata CD Block was 247,838 (83.32% of the population over 6 years) out of which males numbered 134,183 (86.89% of the male population over 6 years) and females numbered 113,655 (77.51% of the female population over 6 years). The gender disparity (the difference between female and male literacy rates) was 9.39%.

See also – List of West Bengal districts ranked by literacy rate

Literacy in CD blocks of
North 24 Parganas district
Barasat Sadar subdivision
Amdanga – 80.69%
Deganga – 79.65%
Barasat I – 81.50%
Barasat II – 77.71%
Habra I – 83.15%
Habra II – 81.05%
Rajarhat – 83.13%
Basirhat subdivision
Baduria – 78.75%
Basirhat I – 72.10%
Basirhat II – 78.30%
Haroa – 73.13%
Hasnabad – 71.47%
Hingalganj – 76.85%
Minakhan – 71.33%
Sandeshkhali I – 71.08%
Sandeshkhali II – 70.96%
Swarupnagar – 77.57%
Bangaon subdivision
Bagdah – 75.30%
Bangaon – 79.71%
Gaighata – 82.32%
Barrackpore subdivision
Barrackpore I – 85.91%
Barrackpore II – 84.53%
Source: 2011 Census: CD Block Wise
Primary Census Abstract Data

=== Language and religion ===
Religion in Gaighata CD block (2011)
Hinduism	93.27%
Islam	6.42%
Other or not stated	0.31%

In the 2011 census Hindus numbered 308,073 and formed 93.27% of the population in Gaighata CD Block. Muslims numbered 21,198 and formed 6.42% of the population. Others numbered 1,016 and formed 0.31% of the population.

In 1981 Hindus numbered 179,251 and formed 93.31% of the population and Muslims numbered 12,247 and formed 6.38% of the population. In 1991 Hindus numbered 246,643 and formed 93.43% of the population and Muslims numbered 16,160 and formed 6.28% of the population in Gaighata CD Block. (In 1981 and 1991 census was conducted as per jurisdiction of the police station). In 2001 in Gaighata CD block, Hindus were 280,869 (93.44%) and Muslims 18,841 (6.27%).

Bengali is the predominant language, spoken by 99.65% of the population.

== Rural poverty ==
22.70% of households in Gaighata CD Block lived below poverty line in 2001, against an average of 29.28% in North 24 Parganas district.

== Economy ==
=== Livelihood ===
Livelihood
in Gaighata CD Block
1. Cultivators (17.4%)
2. Agricultural labourers (31.8%)
3. Household industries (4.86%)
4. Other Workers (46.0%)

In Gaighata CD Block in 2011, amongst the class of total workers, cultivators numbered 21,115 and formed 17.38% of the total workers, agricultural labourers numbered 38,700 and formed 31.79%, household industry workers numbered 5,920 and formed 4.86% and other workers numbered 55,944 and formed 45.96%. Total workers numbered 121,719 and formed 36.85% of the total population, and non-workers numbered 208,568 and formed 63.15% of the population.

In more than 30 percent of the villages in North 24 Parganas, agriculture or household industry is no longer the major source of livelihood for the main workers there. The CD Blocks in the district can be classified as belonging to three categories: border areas, Sundarbans area and other rural areas. The percentage of other workers in the other rural areas category is considerably higher than those in the border areas and Sundarbans area.

Note: In the census records a person is considered a cultivator, if the person is engaged in cultivation/ supervision of land owned by self/government/institution. When a person who works on another person’s land for wages in cash or kind or share, is regarded as an agricultural labourer. Household industry is defined as an industry conducted by one or more members of the family within the household or village, and one that does not qualify for registration as a factory under the Factories Act. Other workers are persons engaged in some economic activity other than cultivators, agricultural labourers and household workers. It includes factory, mining, plantation, transport and office workers, those engaged in business and commerce, teachers, entertainment artistes and so on.

=== Infrastructure ===
There are 100 inhabited villages in Gaighata CD Block, as per the District Census Handbook: North 24 Parganas. 100% villages have power supply and drinking water supply. 23 villages (23.00%) have post offices. 97 villages (97.00%) have telephones (including landlines, public call offices and mobile phones). 48 villages (48.00%) have a pucca approach road and 50 villages (50.00%) have transport communication (includes bus service, rail facility and navigable waterways). 22 villages (22.00%) have agricultural credit societies and 20 villages (20.00%) have banks.

=== Agriculture ===
The North 24 Parganas district Human Development Report opines that in spite of agricultural productivity in North 24 Parganas district being rather impressive 81.84% of rural population suffered from shortage of food. With a high urbanisation of 54.3% in 2001, the land use pattern in the district is changing quite fast and the area under cultivation is declining. However, agriculture is still the major source of livelihood in the rural areas of the district.

From 1977 on wards major land reforms took place in West Bengal. Land in excess of land ceiling was acquired and distributed amongst the peasants. Following land reforms land ownership pattern has undergone transformation. In 2010-11, persons engaged in agriculture in Gaighata CD Block could be classified as follows: bargadars 1,405 (2.23%), patta (document) holders 4,578 (7.26%), small farmers (possessing land between 1 and 2 hectares) 3,630 (5.76%), marginal farmers (possessing land up to 1 hectare) 24,655 (39.11%) and agricultural labourers 28,766 (45.64%).

Gaighata CD Block had 164 fertiliser depots, 30 seed stores and 60 fair price shops in 2010-11.

In 2010-11, Gaighata CD Block produced 21,351 tonnes of Aman paddy, the main winter crop from 9,116 hectares, 32,024 tonnes of Boro paddy (spring crop) from 9,038 hectares, 3,030 tonnes of Aus paddy (summer crop) from 1,172 hectares, 733 tonnes of wheat from 275 hectares, 84,532 tonnes of jute from 4,158 hectares, 48,718 tonnes of potatoes from 1,116 hectares and 42,625 tonnes of sugar cane from 525 hectares. It also produced pulses and oilseeds.

In 2010-11, the total area irrigated in Gaighata CD Block was 3,320 hectares, out of which 687 hectares were irrigated by tank water, 780 hectares by river lift irrigation, 745 hectares by deep tube well, 125 hectares by shallow tube well and 983 hectares by other means.

=== Pisciculture ===
In 2010-11, the net area under effective pisciculture in Gaighata CD Block was 2,173.72 hectares. 12,497 persons were engaged in the profession. Approximate annual production was 65,211.6 quintals.

=== Banking ===
In 2010-11, Gaighata CD Block had offices of 9 commercial banks and 5 gramin banks.

== Transport ==
In 2010-11, Gaighata CD Block had 3 originating/ terminating bus routes.

NH 112 (old numbering NH 35) (also known as Jessore Road) and SH 3 has a common route through this block.

There are stations at Chandpara railway station and Thakurnagar railway station on the Sealdah-Bangaon line

== Education ==
In 2010-11, Gaighata CD Block had 162 primary schools with 16,368 students, 10 high schools with 4,243 students and 27 higher secondary schools with 33,632 students. Gaighata CD Block had 489 institutions for special and non-formal education with 16,175 students.

As per the 2011 census, in Gaighata CD Block, amongst the 100 inhabited villages, all villages had a school, 70 villages had more than 1 primary school, 52 villages had at least 1 primary and 1 middle school and 42 villages had at least 1 middle and 1 secondary school.

== Healthcare ==
In 2011, Gaighata CD Block had 1 block primary health centre and 4 primary health centres, with total 37 beds and 6 doctors (excluding private bodies). It had 46 family welfare subcentres. 1,210 patients were treated indoors and 87,823 patients were treated outdoor in the hospitals, health centres and subcentres of the CD Block.

Chandpara Rural Hospital at Chandpara with 30 beds is the main medical facility in Gaighata CD Block. There are primary health centres at Gaighata (with 6 beds), Dharampur (with 6 beds), Ramchandrapur (Baduria PHC with 10 beds) and Ghonja (Dr. B.R.Roy PHC with 6 beds).

Gaighata block is one of the areas where ground water is affected by arsenic contamination.

The possibility of a low cost river water treatment plant utilizing water from Yamuna-Ichhamati at Gighata has been considered. However, this is not considered feasible because the river is highly polluted, costs would considerably increased because of installation of chemical treatment plant to remove pollutants, and the volume of water in the river in summer season is not sufficient.

Project Well, a NGO, is implementing a self-supporting community-based mitigation program in Gaighata to provide arsenic safe water by constructing 20 modified conventional dugwells along with education on water related health effects to change behaviour.
