= Gaighata, North 24 Parganas =

Gaighata
- Village
- Location in West Bengal, India Gaighata (India)
- Coordinates: 22.934521°N 88.730754°E
- Country: India
- State: West Bengal
- District: North 24 Parganas

Population (2011)
  - Total: 3,878

Languages
  - Official: Bengali, English
- Time zone: UTC+5:30 (IST)
- PIN: 743249 (Gaighata)
- Telephone/STD code: 03215
- Lok Sabha constituency: Bangaon
- Vidhan Sabha constituency: Gaighata
- Website: north24parganas.nic.in

Gaighata is a village in the Gaighata CD block in the Bangaon subdivision of the North 24 Parganas district in the state of West Bengal, India.

== Geography ==
Cities, towns and locations in Bangaon subdivision, North 24 Parganas district
M: municipal town, CT: census town, R: rural/ urban centre, T: place of tourist interest
Owing to space constraints in the small map, the actual locations in a larger map may vary slightly

=== Location ===
Gaighata is located at 22.934521°N 88.730754°E.

=== Area overview ===
The area shown in the map was a part of Jessore district from 1883. At the time of Partition of Bengal (1947) the Radcliffe Line placed the police station areas of Bangaon and Gaighata of Jessore district in India and the area was made a part of 24 Parganas district. The renowned novelist, Bibhutibhushan Bandopadhyay (of Pather Panchali fame) belonged to this area and many of his writings portray his experience in the area. It is a flat plain located in the lower Ganges Delta. In the densely populated area, 16.33% of the population lives in the urban areas and 83.67% lives in the rural areas.

Note: The map alongside presents some of the notable locations in the subdivision. All places marked in the map are linked in the larger full screen map.

== Civic administration ==
=== Police station ===
Gaighata police station covers an area of 248.64 km^{2} and serves a population of 329,815. Gaighata police district has a border of 21.72 km, of which 15 km is unfenced. It has jurisdiction over Gaighata CD block.

== Demographics ==
According to the 2011 Census of India, Gaighata had a total population of 3,878, of which 1,999 (52%) were males and 1,879 (48%) were females. Population in the age range 0–6 years was 354. The total number of literate persons in Gaighata was 3,212 (91.15% of the population over 6 years).

== Transport ==
NH 112 (also known as Jessore Road and SH 3 (common route in this area) passes through Gaighata and separate out here.

== Education ==
Gaighata High School is a Bengali-medium co-educational higher secondary school. It was established in 1948.

Gaighata Benimadhab Balika Vidyalaya is a Bengali-medium girls only high school. It was established in 1958.

== Healthcare ==
Gaighata has a primary health centre with 6 beds.
