= Swarupnagar Assembly constituency =

Swarupnagar
- Constituency No. 98 for the West Bengal Legislative Assembly
- Interactive Map Outlining Swarupnagar Assembly Constituency

Constituency details
- Country: India
- Region: East India
- State: West Bengal
- District: North 24 Parganas
- Lok Sabha constituency: Bangaon
- Established: 1951
- Total electors: 246,109
- Reservation: SC

Member of Legislative Assembly
- 18th West Bengal Legislative Assembly
- Incumbent Bina Mondal
- Party: Democratic Trinamool Congress
- Elected year: 2026

Swarupnagar Assembly constituency is an assembly constituency in North 24 Parganas district in the Indian state of West Bengal. It is reserved for scheduled castes.

== Overview ==
As per orders of the Delimitation Commission, No. 98 Swarupnagar Assembly constituency (SC) is composed of the following: Swarupnagar community development block, and Ramchandrapur Uday and Sayesta Nagar I gram panchayats of Baduria community development block.

Swarupnagar Assembly constituency (SC) is part of No. 14 Bangaon (Lok Sabha constituency) (SC). It was earlier part of Basirhat (Lok Sabha constituency).

== Members of the Legislative Assembly ==
Year	Name	Party
1951	Mohammad Ishaque	Indian National Congress
1957	Mohammad Ishaque	Indian National Congress
1962	Abdul Gafur	Indian National Congress
1967	Jamini Ranjan Sen	Communist Party of India
1969	Jamini Ranjan Sen	Communist Party of India
1971	Chandranath Misra	Indian National Congress
1972	Chandranath Misra	Indian National Congress
1977	Anisur Rahman Biswas	Communist Party of India
1982	Anisur Rahman Biswas	Communist Party of India
1987	Anisur Rahman Biswas	Communist Party of India
1991	Mustafa Bin Quassem	Communist Party of India
1996	Mustafa Bin Quassem	Communist Party of India
2001	Mustafa Bin Quassem	Communist Party of India
2006	Mustafa Bin Quassem	Communist Party of India
2011	Bina Mondal	Trinamool Congress
2016	Bina Mondal	Trinamool Congress
2021	Bina Mondal	Trinamool Congress
2026	Bina Mondal	Trinamool Congress

== Election results ==
=== 2026 ===
2026 West Bengal Legislative Assembly election: Swarupnagar
Party	Candidate	Votes	%	±%
AITC	Bina Mondal	94,813	43.47	▼3.64
BJP	Tarak Saha	78,796	36.13	▲5.45
CPI(M)	Biswajit Mondal	38,409	17.61	▼2.82
INC	Ritesh Mondal	2,384	1.09	
NOTA	None of the above	1,230	0.56	▼0.03
Majority		16,017	7.34	▼9.09
Turnout		218,120	95.01	▲8.95
AITC hold		Swing		

=== 2021 ===
In the 2021 elections, Bina Mondol of Trinamool Congress defeated her nearest rival, Brindaban Sarkar of BJP.

2021 West Bengal Legislative Assembly election: Swarupnagar
Party	Candidate	Votes	%	±%
AITC	Bina Mondal	99,784	47.11	
BJP	Brindaban Sarkar	64,984	30.68	▲24.02
CPI(M)	Biswajit Mandal	43,282	20.43	▼21.95
NOTA	None of the above	1,256	0.59	
Majority		34,800	16.43	
Turnout		211,804	86.06	
AITC hold		Swing		

=== 2016 ===
In the 2016 elections, Bina Mondol of Trinamool Congress defeated her nearest rival, Dhiman Sarkar of CPI(M).

West Bengal assembly elections, 2016: Swarupnagar (SC) constituency
Party	Candidate	Votes	%	±%
AITC	Bina Mondal	93,807	48.56	−0.38
CPI(M)	Dhiman Sarkar	81,866	42.38	−2.22
BJP	Mihir Kumar Bagchi	12,866	6.66	+3.34
NOTA	None of the above	1,916	0.99	
SUCI(C)	Shibani Halder	1,618	0.84	
BSP	Santosh Kumar Biswas	1,088	0.56	
Turnout		193,161	85.74	−1.64
AITC hold		Swing		

=== 2011 ===
In the 2011 elections, Bina Mondol of Trinamool Congress defeated her nearest rival Shiva Pada Das of CPI(M).

West Bengal assembly elections, 2011: Swarupnagar (SC) constituency
Party	Candidate	Votes	%	±%
AITC	Bina Mondal	83,641	48.94	−1.78#
CPI(M)	Shiva Pada Das	76,227	44.60	−2.08
BJP	Rakhal Halder	5,682	3.32	
RPI(A)	Sukriti Ranjan Biswas	4,063		
BSP	Renuka Sarkar	1,286		
Turnout		170,899	87.38	
AITC gain from CPI(M)		Swing	1.30#	

.# Swing calculated on Congress+Trinamool Congress vote percentages taken together in 2006.

=== 2006 ===
In the 2006, 2001, 1996 and 1991 Mustafa Bin Quassem of CPI(M) won the Swarupnagar assembly seat defeating his nearest rivals - Narayan Goswami of Trinamool Congress in 2006, Swaraj Misra of Trinamool Congress in 2001, Dipti Jana of Congress in 1996 and Abdul Hai Siddiqui of Congress in 1991. Contests in most years were multi cornered but only winners and runners are being mentioned. Anisur Rahman Biswas of CPI(M) defeated Abdul Hai Siddiqui of Congress in 1987, Harasit Ghosh of Congress in 1982 and Chandranath Misra of Congress in 1977.

=== 1972 ===
Chandranath Misra of Congress won in 1972 and 1971. Jamini Ranjan Sen of CPI won in 1969 and 1967. Abdul Gafur of Congress won in 1962. Mohammad Ishaque of Congress won in 1957 and in independent India's first election in 1951.
