= Bangaon subdivision =

- Subdivision
- Interactive map of Bangaon subdivision
- Coordinates: 23.07°N 88.82°E
- Country: India
- State: West Bengal
- District: North 24 Parganas
- Headquarters: Bangaon

Government
  - MP: Shantanu Thakur (BJP)

Area
  - Total: 838.17 km^{2} (323.62 sq mi)

Population (2011)
  - Total: 1,063,028
  - Density: 1,268.3/km^{2} (3,284.8/sq mi)

Languages
  - Official: Bengali, English
- Time zone: UTC+5:30 (IST)
- PIN: 743232 (Bagdah); 743270 (Helencha); 743297 (Sindrani); 743235 (Bongaon); 743251 (Ganrapota); 743262 (Gopalnagar); 743701 (Palla); 743249 (Gaighata); 743245 (Chandpara); 743287 (Thakurnagar); 743290 (Nahata); 743710 (Mendia/Media Hat)
- ISO 3166 code: IN-WB
- Vehicle registration: WB
- Website: wb.gov.in

Bangaon subdivision is an administrative subdivision of the North 24 Parganas district in the Indian state of West Bengal.

== History ==
In 1883 Bangaon subdivision was transferred from Nadia district to Jessore District. At the time of Partition of Bengal (1947) the police station areas of Bangaon and Gaighata of Bongaon Subdivision of Jessore district, forming Bangaon subdivision, were placed in India, and the rest of Jessore district in East Pakistan.

== Geography ==
Bangaon subdivision is part of the Ichhamati-Raimangal Plain, one of the three physiographic regions in the district located in the lower Ganges Delta. It contains soil of mature black or brownish loam to recent alluvium. The Ichhamati flows through the eastern part of the district.

== Subdivisions ==

North 24 Parganas district is divided into the following administrative subdivisions:

| Subdivision | Headquarters | Area km^{2} | Population (2011) | Urban population % (2011) | Rural Population % (2011) |
|---|---|---|---|---|---|
| Bangaon | Bangaon | 838.17 | 1,063,028 | 16.33 | 83.67 |
| Barasat Sadar | Barasat | 1,002.48 | 2,789,611 | 54.67 | 45.33 |
| Barrackpore | Barrackpore | 334.51 | 3,668,653 | 96.02 | 3.98 |
| Bidhannagar | Bidhannagar | 33.50 | 216,609 | 100.00 | 0 |
| Basirhat | Basirhat | 1,777.02 | 2,271,880 | 12.96 | 87.04 |
| North 24 Parganas district | Barasat | 4,094.00 | 10,009,781 | 57.27 | 42.73 |

== Religion ==
Given below is an overview of the religion-wise break-up of the population across the subdivisions of North 24 Parganas district, as per 2011 census:

Religion in North 24 Parganas
| Hindu | 73.45% |
| Muslim | 25.82% |
| Christian | 0.24% |
| Sikh | 0.48% |
Source: Census Report of 2011, Government Of India

| Subdivision | Population (2011) | Hindu % | Muslim % | Christian % | Others % |
|---|---|---|---|---|---|
| Bangaon | 1,063,028 | 85.63 | 13.73 | 0.26 | 0.38 |
| Barasat Sadar | 2,789,611 | 65.18 | 34.26 | 0.16 | 0.40 |
| Barrackpore | 3,668,653 | 88.61 | 10.32 | 0.35 | 0.71 |
| Bidhannagar | 216,609 | 95.26 | 2.56 | 0.45 | 1.73 |
| Basirhat | 2,271,880 | 51.37 | 48.37 | 0.14 | 0.13 |
| North 24 Parganas district | 10,009,781 | 73.45 | 25.82 | 0.24 | 0.48 |

North 24 Parganas district with 24.22% Muslims (in 2001) was identified as a minority concentrated district by the Ministry of Minority Affairs, Government of India. A baseline survey on religious minority population was carried out under the aegis of Indian Council of Social Science Research and funded by the Ministry of Minority Affairs. For information on the survey see North 24 Parganas: minority concentrated district.

== Population movement ==
North 24 Parganas district is densely populated, mainly because of the influx of refugees from East Pakistan (later Bangladesh). With a density of population of 2,182 per km^{2} in 1971, it was 3rd in terms of density per km^{2} in West Bengal after Kolkata and Howrah, and 20th in India. According to the District Human Development Report: North 24 Parganas, “High density is also explained partly by the rapid growth of urbanization in the district. In 1991, the percentage of urban population in the district has been 51.23.”

As per the Refugee Relief and Rehabilitation Department of the Government of West Bengal, the census figures show the number of refugees from East Pakistan in 1971 was nearly 6 million and in 1981, the number was assessed at 8 million. A district-wise break-up in 1971, shows the main thrust of the refugee influx was on 24-Parganas (22.3% of the total refugees), Nadia (20.3%), Bankura (19.1%) and Kolkata (12.9%).

The North 24 Paraganas district has a 352 km long international border with Bangladesh, out of which 160 km is land border and 192 km is riverine border. Only a small portion of the border has been fenced and it is popularly referred to as a porous border. There are reports of Bangladeshi infiltrators. The CD Block pages carry decadal population growth information.

An estimate in 2000 placed the total number of illegal Bangladeshi immigrants in India at 1.5 crore, with around 3 lakh entering every year. The thumb rule for such illegal immigrants is that for each illegal person caught four get through. While many immigrants have settled in the border areas, some have moved on, even to far way places such as Mumbai and Delhi. The border is guarded by the Border Security Force. During the UPA government, Sriprakash Jaiswal, Union Minister of State for Home Affairs, had made a statement in Parliament on 14 July 2004, that there were 12 million illegal Bangladeshi infiltrators living in India, and West Bengal topped the list with 5.7 million Bangladeshis. More recently, Kiren Rijiju, Minister of State for Home Affairs in the NDA government has put the figure at around 20 million.

== Administrative units ==
Cities, towns and locations in Bangaon subdivision, North 24 Parganas district
M: municipal town, CT: census town, R: rural/ urban centre, T: place of tourist interest
Owing to space constraints in the small map, the actual locations in a larger map may vary slightly

Bangaon subdivision has 6 police stations including 1 women PS, 3 Community development blocks, 3 panchayat samitis, 38 gram panchayats, 363 mouzas, 355 inhabited villages, 1 municipality and 7 census towns. The municipality is at Bangaon. The census towns are: Chandpara, Chhekati, Sonatikiri, Dhakuria, Chikanpara, Shimulpur and Bara. The subdivision has its headquarters at Bangaon.

== Police stations ==
Bangaon being a border adjacent area, in May 2019,Government of West Bengal has formed Bangaon as a new Police district for better policing and administration, dividing it from Barasat police district. Tarun Halder, was appointed as the first SP of Bangaon. Since its bifurcation, Bongaon is now the smallest Police district having only 6 police stations under its jurisdiction.

Police stations in Bangaon subdivision have the following features and jurisdiction:

| Police station | Area covered (km^{2}) | Border (km) | Municipal town/ city | Camp | CD Block |
|---|---|---|---|---|---|
| Bagadah | 233.055 | 58 | – | Baksa, Nataberia, Gadpukuria | Bagdah |
| Bangaon | 140.5 | 9.8 | Bangaon | PS Camp SAP, Ganrapota, Bongaon TOP | Bangaon partly |
| Gaighata | 248.64 | 21.72 | – | Sutia, Thakurbari | Gaighata |
| Gopalnagar | 154 | 0 | – | Champta (SAP), Nahata (SAP), Shimulia | Bangaon partly |
| Petrapole | 16.5 | 8.6 | – | – | Bangaon partly |
| Women PS (Bangaon) | same jurisdiction area of Bongaon PS | | | | |

== Blocks ==

Community development blocks in Bangaon subdivision are:

| CD Block | Headquarters | Area km^{2} | Population (2011) | SC % | ST % | Hindus % | Muslims % | Literacy rate % | Census Towns |
|---|---|---|---|---|---|---|---|---|---|
| Bagdah | Bagdah | 233.47 | 242,974 | 54.81 | 5.33 | 82.00 | 17.42 | 75.30 | - |
| Bangaon | Bangaon | 336.70 | 380,903 | 46.60 | 3.61 | 78.17 | 18.47 | 79.71 | - |
| Gaighata | Chandpara Bazar | 243.30 | 330,287 | 49.13 | 1.76 | 93.27 | 6.42 | 83.32 | 7 |

== Gram panchayats ==
The subdivision contains 38 gram panchayats under 3 community development blocks:

- Gram panchayats in Bagdah CD Block are: Asharu, Helencha, Malipota, Bagda, Koniara–I, Ranghat, Bayra, Koniara–II and Sindrani.
- Gram panchayats in Bangaon CD Block are: Akaipur, Chhaighoria, Gangrapota, Kalupur, Bairampur, Dharam Pukuria, Ghatbour, Palla, Chawberia–I, Dighari, Gopalnagar–I, Sundarpur, Chawberia–II, Ganganandapur, Gopalnagar–II and Tengra.
- Gram panchayats in Gaighata CD Block are Chandpara, Fulsara, Jaleswar–II, Sutia, Dharmapur–I, Ichapur–I, Jhaudanga, Dharmapur–II, Ichapur–II, Ramnagar, Duma, Jaleswar–I and Shimulpur.

== Municipal towns/ cities ==
An overview of the only municipal city in Bangaon subdivision is given below.

| Municipal town/city | Area (km^{2}) | Population (2011) | Hindus % | Muslims % | Slum population % | BPL Households % (2006) | Literacy% (2001) |
|---|---|---|---|---|---|---|---|
| Bangaon | 15.57 | 108,864 | 96.66 | 2.85 | 14.53 | 37.45 | 84.16 |

== Education ==
North 24 Parganas district had a literacy rate of 84.06% (for population of 7 years and above) as per the census of India 2011. Bangaon subdivision had a literacy rate of 80.57%, Barasat Sadar subdivision 84.90%, Barrackpur subdivision 89.09%, Bidhannagar subdivision 89.16% and Basirhat subdivision 75.67%.

Given in the table below (data in numbers) is a comprehensive picture of the education scenario in North 24 Parganas district for the year 2012-13:

| Subdivision | Primary School | | Middle School | | High School | | Higher Secondary School | | General College, Univ | | Technical / Professional Instt | | Non-formal Education | |
| Subdivision | Institution | Student | Institution | Student | Institution | Student | Institution | Student | Institution | Student | Institution | Student | Institution | Student |
|---|---|---|---|---|---|---|---|---|---|---|---|---|---|---|
| Bangaon | 533 | 54,361 | 1 | 36 | 31 | 14,654 | 83 | 107,745 | 4 | 11,031 | 1 | 95 | 1,594 | 54,016 |
| Barasat Sadar | 920 | 120,670 | 19 | 2,734 | 93 | 63,707 | 171 | 246,098 | 14 | 40,466 | 23 | 6,190 | 2,887 | 130,522 |
| Barrackpore | 948 | 126,453 | 29 | 5,716 | 193 | 165,924 | 205 | 215,713 | 25 | 44,818 | 20 | 6,345 | 2,483 | 160,236 |
| Bidhannagar | 20 | 12,317 | - | - | 1 | 900 | 17 | 22,536 | 1 | 865 | 15 | 5,432 | 1 | 552 |
| Basirhat | 1,256 | 139,737 | 25 | 10,165 | 124 | 101,536 | 118 | 105,724 | 5 | 15,248 | - | - | 3,800 | 164,833 |
| North 24 Parganas district | 3,677 | 453,538 | 74 | 18,651 | 442 | 346,721 | 594 | 697,816 | 49 | 112,428 | 59 | 18,062 | 10,765 | 439,560 |

Note: Primary schools include junior basic schools; middle schools, high schools and higher secondary schools include madrasahs; technical schools include junior technical schools, junior government polytechnics, industrial technical institutes, industrial training centres, nursing training institutes etc.; technical and professional colleges include engineering colleges, medical colleges, para-medical institutes, management colleges, teachers training and nursing training colleges, law colleges, art colleges, music colleges etc. Special and non-formal education centres include sishu siksha kendras, madhyamik siksha kendras, centres of Rabindra mukta vidyalaya, recognised Sanskrit tols, institutions for the blind and other handicapped persons, Anganwadi centres, reformatory schools etc.

The following institutions are located in Bangaon subdivision:

List of Colleges & University in Bongaon Sub-division
| College Name | Place | Established | Ref |
|---|---|---|---|
| Dr. B. R. Ambedkar Satabarshiki Mahavidyalaya | Helencha | 2005 | |
| Dinabandhu Mahavidyalay | Bangaon | 1947 | |
| Gobardanga Hindu College | Gobardanga | 1947 | |
| Nahata Jogendranath Mandal Smriti Mahavidyalaya | Nahata | 1985 | |
| P. R. Thakur Government College | Thakurnagar | 2013 | |
| Harichand Guruchand University | Thakurnagar | 2019 | |

== Healthcare ==
The table below (all data in numbers) presents an overview of the medical facilities available and patients treated in the hospitals, health centres and sub-centres in 2013 in North 24 Parganas district.

| Subdivision | Health & Family Welfare Deptt, WB | | | | Other State Govt Deptts** | Local bodies** | Central Govt Deptts / PSUs** | NGO / Private Nursing Homes** | Total | Total Number of Beds | Total Number of Doctors* | Indoor Patients | Outdoor Patients |
| Subdivision | Hospitals | Rural Hospitals | Block Primary Health Centres | Primary Health Centres | Other State Govt Deptts** | Local bodies** | Central Govt Deptts / PSUs** | NGO / Private Nursing Homes** | Total | Total Number of Beds | Total Number of Doctors* | Indoor Patients | Outdoor Patients |
|---|---|---|---|---|---|---|---|---|---|---|---|---|---|
| Bangaon | 1 | 1 | 2 | 10 | - | - | - | - | 14 | 417 | 24 | 11,587 | 650,349 |
| Barasat Sadar | 3 | 1 | 6 | 15 | - | - | - | - | 25 | 1,084 | 45 | 125,000 | 1,397,574 |
| Barrackpore | 7 | - | 2 | 2 | - | - | - | - | 11 | 1,081 | 8 | 94,042 | 1,010,820 |
| Bidhannagar | 1 | - | - | - | - | - | - | ` | 1 | 100 | - | 6,567 | 117,136 |
| Basirhat | 1 | 5 | 5 | 23 | - | - | - | - | 34 | 703 | 77 | 69,034 | 897,725 |
| North 24 Parganas district | 13 | 7 | 15 | 50 | 6 | 27 | 3 | 233 | 354 | 3,385 | 154 | 306,230 | 4,073,604 |

.* Excluding nursing homes.
** Subdivision-wise break up for certain items not available.

Medical facilities available in Bangaon subdivision are as follows:

Hospitals: (Name, location, beds)
Dr. Jiban Ratan Dhar Sub divisional Hospital, Bangaon, 600 beds(AHas super speciality hospital)
Bangaon Railway Hospital, Bangaon, 9 beds
Male Vagrants Home (Petrapole), Bangaon, 10 beds,

& Other private owned hospital and clinics.

Rural Hospitals: (Name, block, location, beds)
Bagdah Rural Hospital, Bagda, 30 beds
Chandpara Rural Hospital, at Thakurnagar, 30 beds

Block Primary Health Centres: (Name, block, location, beds)
Sundarpur BPHC, Palla, 15 beds

Primary Health Centres: (CD Block-wise)(CD Block, PHC location, beds)
Bagdah CD Block: Nataberia PHC, Mangalganj (6), Sindrani PHC (10), Koniera PHC, Bena (6)
Bangaon CD Block: Akaipur PHC, Garibpur (6), Chowberia PHC (6)
Gaighata CD Block: Gaighata PHC (6), Dharampur PHC (6), Baduria PHC, Ramchandrapur (10), Dr. B.R.Roy PHC, Ghonja (6)

== Electoral constituencies ==
Lok Sabha (parliamentary) and Vidhan Sabha (state assembly) constituencies in Bangaon subdivision were as follows:

Bangaon (Reserved for SC) consists of following Vidhan Sabha Constituency
| Vidhan Sabha constituency | Reservation | Sub-division | CD Block and/or Gram panchayats and/or municipal areas |
|---|---|---|---|
| Bagdah | Reserved for SC | Bangaon | Bagdah CD Block, and Gangrapota, Sundarpur and Tengra GPs of Bangaon CD Block |
| Bangaon Uttar | Reserved for SC | Bangaon | Bangaon municipality, and Akaipur, Chhaigheria, Dharma Pukuria, Ganganandapur, Ghatbore, Gopalnagar I and Gopalnagar II GPs of Bangaon CD Block |
| Bangaon Dakshin | Reserved for SC | Bangaon | Bairampur, Chauberia I, Chauberia II, Dighari, Kalupur and Palla GPs of Bangaon CD Block, and Chandpara, Dooma, Fulsara, Jaleswar II, Jhaudanga, Ramnagar GPs of Gaighata CD Block |
| Gaighata | Reserved for SC | Bangaon | Gobardanga municipality, Dharmapur I, Dharmapur II, Ichapur I, Ichapur II, Jaleswar I, Shimulpur and Sutia GPs of Gaighata CD Block, and Bergum I, Bergum II and Machhalandpur I GPs of Habra I CD Block |
Other assembly segments outside Bangaon subdivision
| Vidhan Sabha Constituency | Reservation | Sub-division | CD Block and/or Gram panchayats and/or municipal areas |
| Kalyani | Reserved for SC | Kalyani | |
| Haringhata | Reserved for SC | Kalyani | |
| Swarupnagar | Reserved for SC | Basirhat | |
