= Alamgir Siddique =

Bangladeshi politician (born 1926)

Alamgir Siddique (আলমগীর সিদ্দিকী) was a politician from Jashore, Bangladesh, who is well-known for his involvement in the Bengali language movement which advocated the recognition of Bengali as a state language of Pakistan.

== Early life ==
Siddique was born on 19 November 1926.

== Career ==
At the start of his political career, Alamgir Siddique was involved with the East Pakistan Muslim Student League. In January 1948, he issued a statement on behalf of the students of Jessore, demanding Bengali as the national language, which was published in the newspaper Ittehad. He played an instrumental role in forming the National Language Action Committee in Jessore in February 1948. On 26 February, in a meeting of student leaders at his home, a decision was made to form a committee similar to the National Language Action Committee in Dhaka. The committee in Jessore was formed on 2 March in a hall of the Michael Madhusudan College. He (on behalf of the Student League) and Ranjit Mitra (on behalf of the Student Federation) were the joint conveners of this committee.

The Bengali language movement in East Pakistan occurred in two phases – 1948 and 1952. In Jessore, the 1948 phase was more explosive and participatory than the 1952 phase. As the movement grew in March 1948, the mob clashed with the police in Jessore. On 13 March, under the leadership of Alamgir Siddique, Jiban Ratan Dhar, and Afsar Ahmed Siddiqui the aggrieved mob and students attacked the district magistrate's office and the collectorate building of Jessore. Siddique got shot during the clash by the police, suffering an injury. He, along with Jiban Ratan Dhar and Afsar Ahmed Siddiqui, played the key role in the construction of the first Shaheed Minar in Jessore. Later on, in 1962, he and Muhammed Abdul Hye, principal of the Michael Madhusudan College, laid the foundation stone of a permanent Shaheed Minar on the college campus, which was considered the Central Shaheed Minar of Jessore till 2017. He was one of the founders of Jessore City College.

In 1949, Siddique joined the Awami Muslim League. He served as a secretary of the party in Jessore. In 1957, when Awami League got split into Awami League (AL) and National Awami Party (NAP), he joined the Bhasani-led NAP, which favored a non-alignment foreign policy, in opposition to Suhrawardy-led AL’s pro-US foreign policy. Then, he became the president of Jessore district NAP and joint secretary of the NAP central committee.

Alamgir Siddique participated in the 1973 Bangladesh General election from the Jessore IX constituency as a NAP-B candidate against Raushan Ali of Awami League, Mosharraf Hossain LL.B. of JSD, and Kazi Abdus Shahid Lal of NAP-M. He died on 17 June 1977. In his memory, a hall in Jessore Institute premises has been named Alamgir Siddique Hall.
