= Kazi Abdus Shahid Lal =

Bangladeshi left-wing politician and freedom fighter (1939–2021)

Kazi Abdus Shahid Lal (Bengali: কাজী আব্দুস শহীদ লাল; 28 November 1939 – 20 May 2021) was a politician and lawyer from Jashore, Bangladesh. He is well known for his involvement in the 1962 East Pakistan education movement, the 1969 East Pakistan mass uprising, and the Bangladesh Liberation War.

== Early life ==
Abdus Shahid was born on 28 November 1939 in Jessore. He studied at Michael Madhusudan College and Rajsahi University.

== Career ==
Abdus Shahid started his political career with the East Pakistan Students Union (EPSU). Subsequently, he was in the National Awami Party (NAP), Communist Party of Bangladesh (CPB), and Gano Forum.

On 31 May 1962, during the East Pakistan education movement against the Martial Law regime, a special military court convicted him under CMLA regulations (24 and 94) and sentenced him to 14 years in prison for participating in student disturbances. This became an exemplary case and gained much national attention. On 6 June, in an extraordinary general meeting of the Dhaka District Bar Association, the members expressed their distress over this conviction and urged the government to withdraw cases and warrants issued under the Safety Act. On 8 June, the government released seven Safety Act prisoners from the Rajshahi Central Jail, but Shahid was not released. The seven detenus made a statement demanding the release of Kazi Abdus Shahid along with other high-profile political prisoners - Abdul Hamid Khan Bhashani, Huseyn Shaheed Suhrawardy, and Abdul Gaffar Khan.

Later on, students and political leaders across the country demanded the release of Kazi Abdus Shahid, along with other student and political prisoners. On 17 June 1962, the East Pakistan Provisional Assembly carried an Adjournment Motion on the release of political prisoners detained under the Safety Act without trial, and a special reference was made to his case.

Following this country-wide protest of students and public leaders, Kazi Abdus Shahid was released from prison. However, in September 1963, notice under Section 107 of the Criminal Procedure Code was issued on him, Principal Abdul Hai of M. M. College, and others in Jessore for instigating the students to indulge in activities causing a serious breach of peace with apprehension of human life and property.

Shahid became a joint secretary of the East Pakistan Workers' Council when it was launched in October 1964. He actively participated in the 1969 East Pakistan mass uprising and Bangladesh Liberation War. He took part in the 1973 Bangladesh General election as a NAP-M candidate for Jessore IX constituency, competing against Raushan Ali of Awami League, Mosharraf Hossain LL.B. of JSD, and Alamgir Siddique of NAP-B. He was elected multiple times as the president and general secretary of the Jessore Bar Association.

== Death ==
Kazi Abdus Shahid died on 20 May 2021 at a local hospital in Jashore at age 82.
