= Mosharraf Hossain (Jessore politician) =

Bangladeshi politician (1925–1974)

- মোশাররফ হোসেন
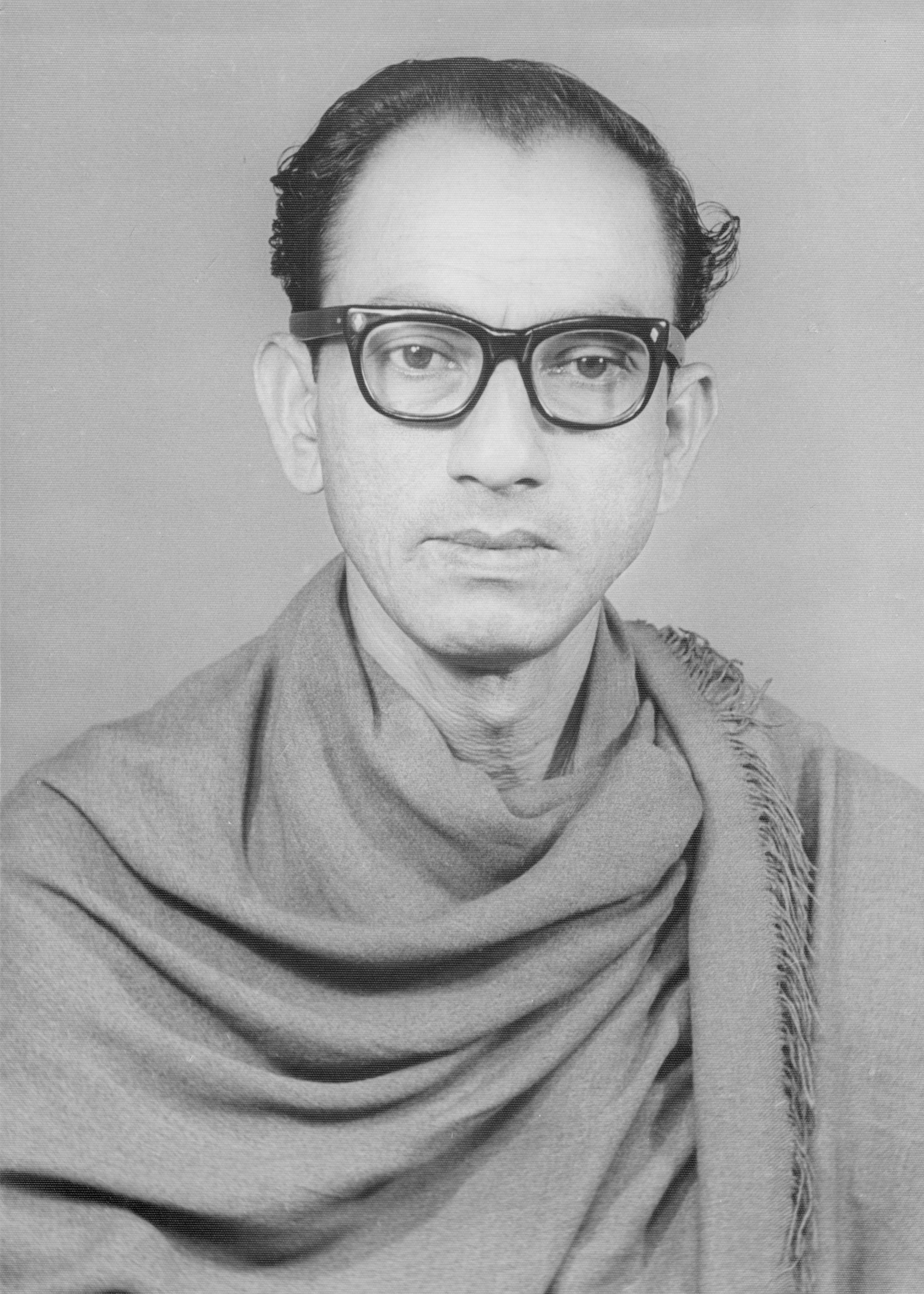

Member of Constituent Assembly of Bangladesh
- In office April 1971 – September 1972

Personal details
- Born: 7 March 1925
- Died: 3 February 1974 (aged 48)
- Party: Jatiya Samajtantrik Dal
- Other political affiliations: Awami League
- Education: Jashore Zilla School; Michael Madhusudan College; University of Calcutta
- Profession: Advocate

Mosharraf Hossain (Bengali: মোশাররফ হোসেন; 7 March 1925 – 3 February 1974) was a politician and lawyer from Jessore, Bangladesh. He was actively involved in the Bengali nationalist movement in East Pakistan and the Liberation War of Bangladesh in 1971.

He was elected as a member of the Provincial Assembly of East Pakistan in the 1970 election, and was a member of the Constituent Assembly of Bangladesh from April 1971 to September 1972. In 1972, he resigned from the Constituent Assembly, left the ruling party Awami League, and joined the left-wing opposition party Jatiya Samajtantrik Dal (abbr. JSD or JASAD or 'জাসদ') as one of its founding vice presidents. Mosharraf was assassinated in 1974.

== Early life ==
Born in the Sabhaipur village of Bangaon (which was then a Mahakuma of the greater Jessore district), Mosharraf studied in Jessore Zilla School and Michael Madhusudan College (known at that time as Jessore College) of today's Jessore. He received B.A, LL.B degree from Ripon College under the University of Calcutta.

== Political career ==
=== Post British India ===
After completing his education, Mosharraf made a brief foray into the state politics of West Bengal. In the Legislative Assembly Election of West Bengal in 1951/52, he contested in the Bangaon constituency as an independent candidate against Jibon Ratan Dhar of the Indian National Congress and Ajit Kumar Ganguly of the Communist Party of India. In 1953, due to his continued opposition to the ruling party, Congress, the Indian government accused him of treason and issued him a 24-hour ultimatum to leave the country.

=== East Pakistan ===
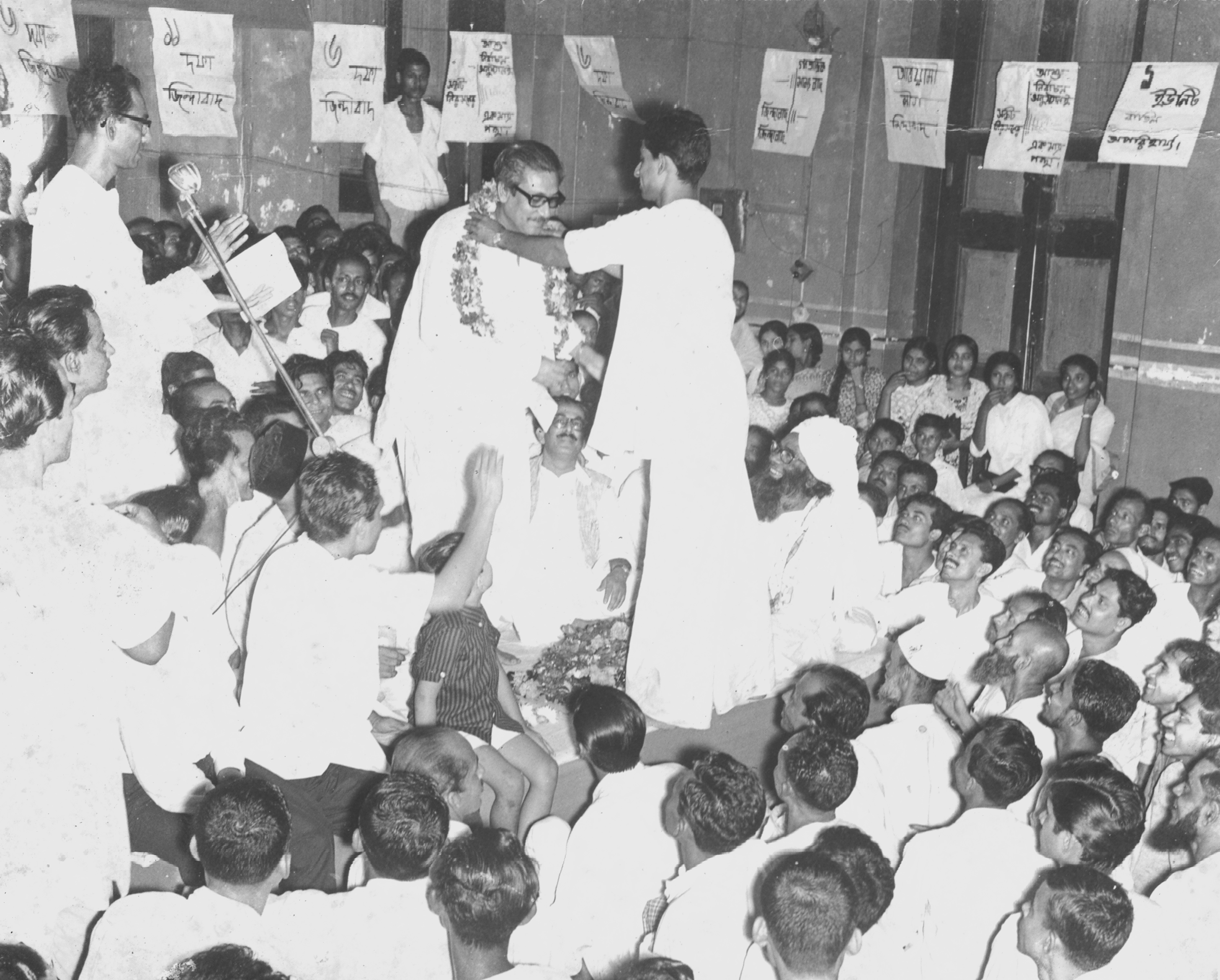
In 1969, Sheikh Mujibur Rahman is being welcomed at a meeting organized in Jessore in support of the Six-point demand. Mosharraf Hossain is on the left, with the microphone, conducting the program.

Afterwards, Hossain returned to Jessore city and continued developing his political career in East Pakistan with Awami League. His elder brother lawyer Habibur Rahman already lived in Jessore and was the first president of Jessore district Awami League. Mosharraf was the secretary of the central relief committee that was formed in Jessore to help the refugees fleeing into Pakistan during the 1964 Calcutta riots.

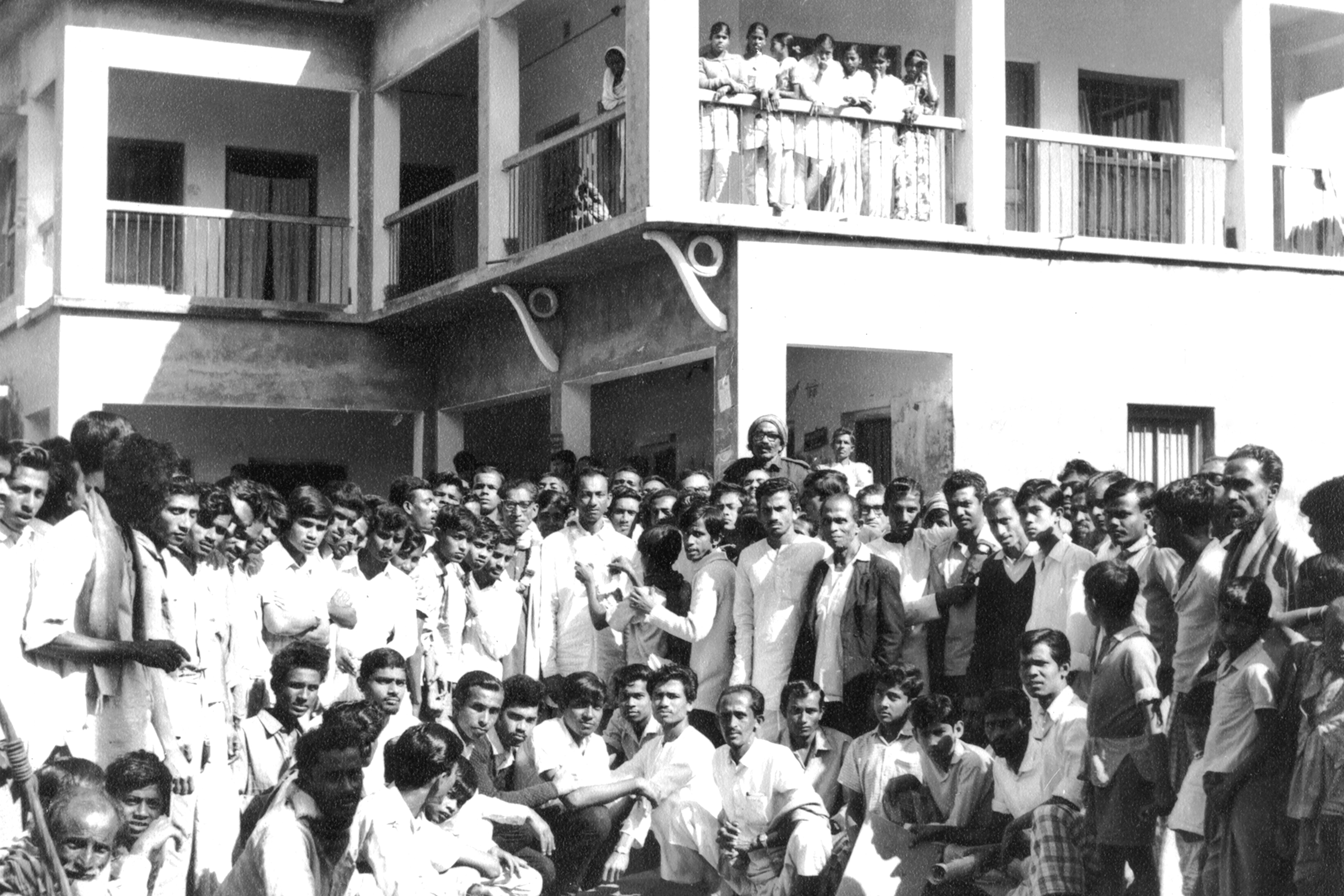
Mosharraf (center) and his supporters in front of his residence after winning the 1970 East Pakistan Provincial Assembly election from Jessore 9.

In 1967, when Sheikh Mujibur Rahman was in jail, the Awami League split into two groups due to disagreements over the Six-point demand. Many of Mosharraf's political compatriots, including Mashiur Rahman and Raushan Ali of Jessore, joined the pro-PDM faction of the Awami League that opposed the Six-point. However, Mosharraf remained in the mainstream Awami League, with the Six-pointers. In January 1968, Sheikh Mujibur Rahman, accused in the Agartala Conspiracy Case and imprisoned in Dhaka Jail, was arrested from the jail gate and taken to Dhaka Cantonment. His whereabouts were kept secret by the Pakistani government. Advocate Mosharraf Hossain made a statement in February demanding the release of information regarding the physical condition and location of Sheikh Mujibur Rahman. In the statement, he also demanded that Sheikh Mujib be allowed to communicate with his family members and lawyers.

1970 East Pakistan Provincial Assembly election result for Jessore IX (PE 86) constituency
Name of the contestant	Political party	Votes received
Mosharraf Hossain	Awami League	39,641
Mohammad Hossain	Jamaat-e-Islami	6,332
Shamsul Huda	PML (Conv.)	4,342
Aysha Sardar	Independent	2,458
Others	Various*	1,918
Total votes polled: 54,691
*Others from PML (Qay.), PDP, NAP & 2 more independents

The pro-PDM leaders eventually returned to the mainstream Awami League during the anti-Ayub movement. An avid political supporter of both the Six-point movement and the 1969 East Pakistan mass uprising, Advocate Mosharraf won in the 1970 Pakistani provincial election from Jessore. On 18 March 1971, in a joint press statement, Mosharraf Hossain, along with Mashiur Rahman and Raushan Ali, alleged that the local military was trying to create panic among the people and demanded punishment for those involved.

=== Bangladesh Liberation War ===
During the Liberation War of Bangladesh in 1971, Pakistan's military government brought several charges against Mosharraf for his activities against the state. The charges included - opposing the state of Pakistan, arms procurement, arms distribution, and arms training. Witness reports from Jessore published in Indian sources mention that the Pakistan army tried fanatically to apprehend Mosharraf Hossain. A reward was announced for the capture of him, dead or alive. Though he evaded capture during Operation Searchlight, his house in Jessore city was raided on 25 March and later seized by the Pakistan army to be used as a camp. At the very early stage of the war, when the Indian government was hesitant to get involved, he met Indian leaders like Jayaprakash Narayan, Indian Prime Minister Indira Gandhi, and others, requesting equipment and initiating support for the refugees.

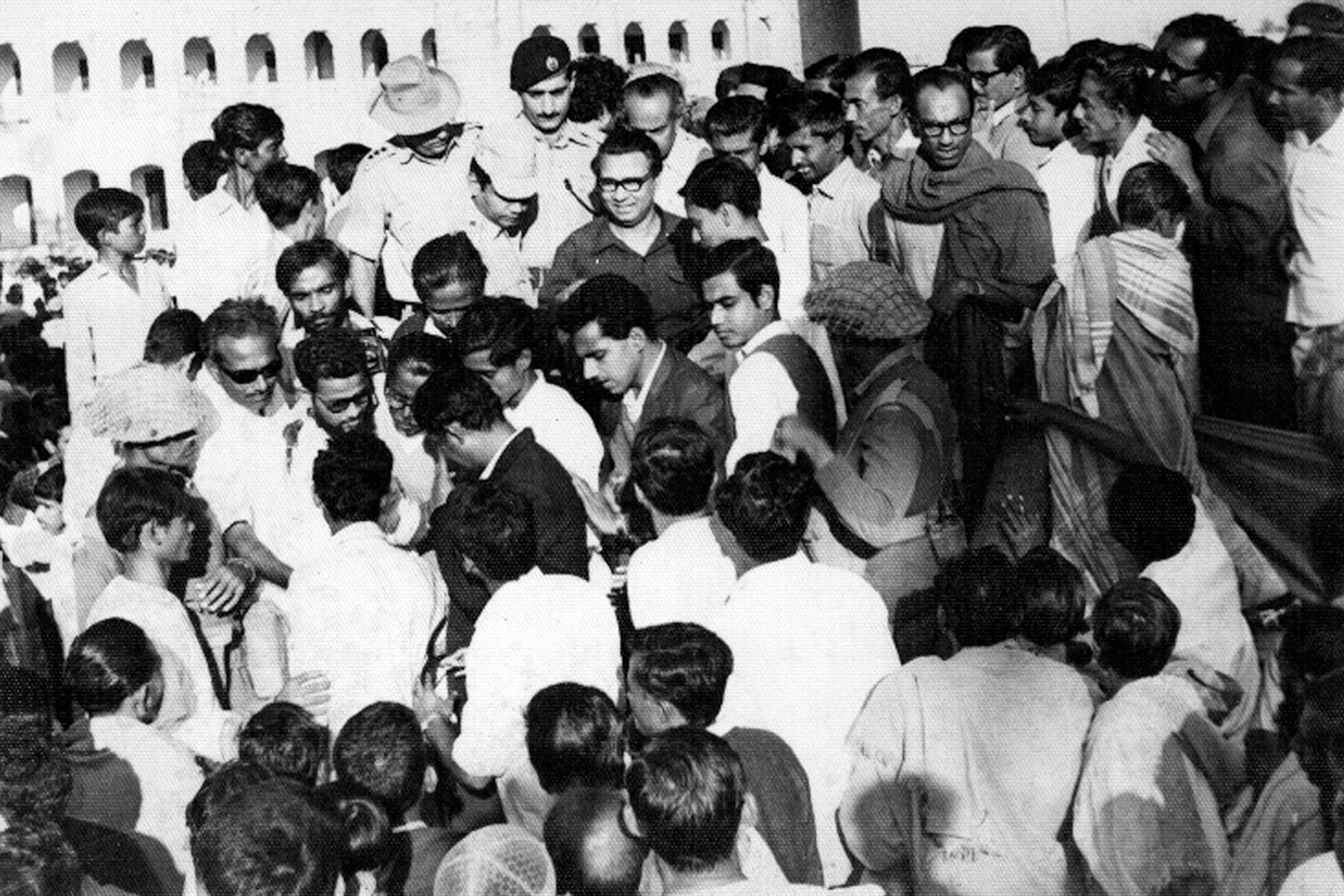
Mosharraf Hossain and Tajuddin Ahmed at the Bangladesh government's first public meeting in the liberated area of Jessore on 11 December 1971.

Mosharraf became a member of the Constituent Assembly of Bangladesh in April. The Provisional Government of Bangladesh appointed him as the head of the Bangaon regugee camp, where food and shelter were provided to incoming refugees from the east. Arms training was also arranged there in a nearby school field. His activities during the war was not confined to administrative duties in the camp. In May 1971, amid heavy artillery fire from the Pakistan army, he accompanied prime minister Tajuddin Ahmed in inspecting the field operation of the Bangladesh army inside Jessore. In November 1971, Bangladesh Awami League, operating the Provisional Government of Bangladesh in exile, tasked him with setting up local administration in the Jessore district and restoring Awami League's organizational capabilities in the area.

=== Independent Bangladesh ===
Though Mosharraf was a central committee member of Awami League, his political differences with the party leadership grew over time. During the April 1972 conference of the Awami League, Mosharraf was dismissed from the central committee and succeeded by Raushan Ali from Jessore. Raushan, a former pro-PDM leader, had previously opposed Mujib's Six-point demand and faced a three-year expulsion from the Awami League in 1967. In 1972, a division within the student wing of the Awami League resulted in Mosharraf's elder daughter, Sathi, aligning with Serajul Alam Khan's faction, which espoused the philosophy of Scientific Socialism and opposed Mujibism. Furthermore, in August of the same year, Mosharraf resigned from the vice-president position of the Jessore district Awami League, objecting the inclusion of political opportunists and sympathizers of the Muslim League within the committee.

On September 10, 1972, the Awami League temporarily suspended Mosharraf's primary membership, citing allegations of violating party orders, acting against the party's interest, and involvement in corruption. Subsequently, Mosharraf received a notice from the party ordering him to explain his conduct or face permanent expulsion. In response, Mosharraf refuted all allegations of corruption, challenged the authority of the Awami League committee to issue such a notice, and expressed concerns about the party's ideological disintegrity, pervasive corruption, and nepotism. Furthermore, he characterized the Awami League's post-liberation politics as more menacing in terms of deceit and betrayal than that of conspirators like Ayub Khan and Abdul Monem. Simultaneously, he announced his resignation from the Constituent Assembly of Bangladesh. The acting speaker accepted his resignation on September 22, and the official cessation notice was published on September 26 of the same year.

Following his departure from Awami League, Mosharraf assumed the role of founding vice-president of the newly established opposition party Jatiya Samajtantrik Dal (JSD), which was founded on October 31, 1972. He also became the president of the Jessore district JSD.

1973 Bangladesh General election result for Jessore IX constituency
Name of the contestant	Political party	Votes received
Raushan Ali	Awami League	57,212
Mosharraf Hossain	JSD	7,374
Kazi Abdus Shahid Lal	NAP (M)	6,803
Alamgir Siddique	NAP (B)	6,052
Sabur Mandal	Independent	845
Total votes polled: 78,286

Mosharraf Hossain went on to participate in the 1973 Bangladeshi general election as a JSD candidate in the (now defunct) Jessore 9 constituency but lost to Raushan Ali of Awami League. In total, only three candidates from the opposition parties, JSD, NAP (M), and Jatiya League, were able to win across the country. The margin of Awami League's victory came as a surprise to many observers.

Following the election, Mosharraf's personal safety became precarious amid an increasingly violent political struggle between Awami League and JSD, plus other left-wing insurgents. Soon he was arrested by the Rakkhi Bahini, a paramilitary force formed by the Bangladesh government to curb the insurgency. He was released on bail after two months.

== Assassination ==
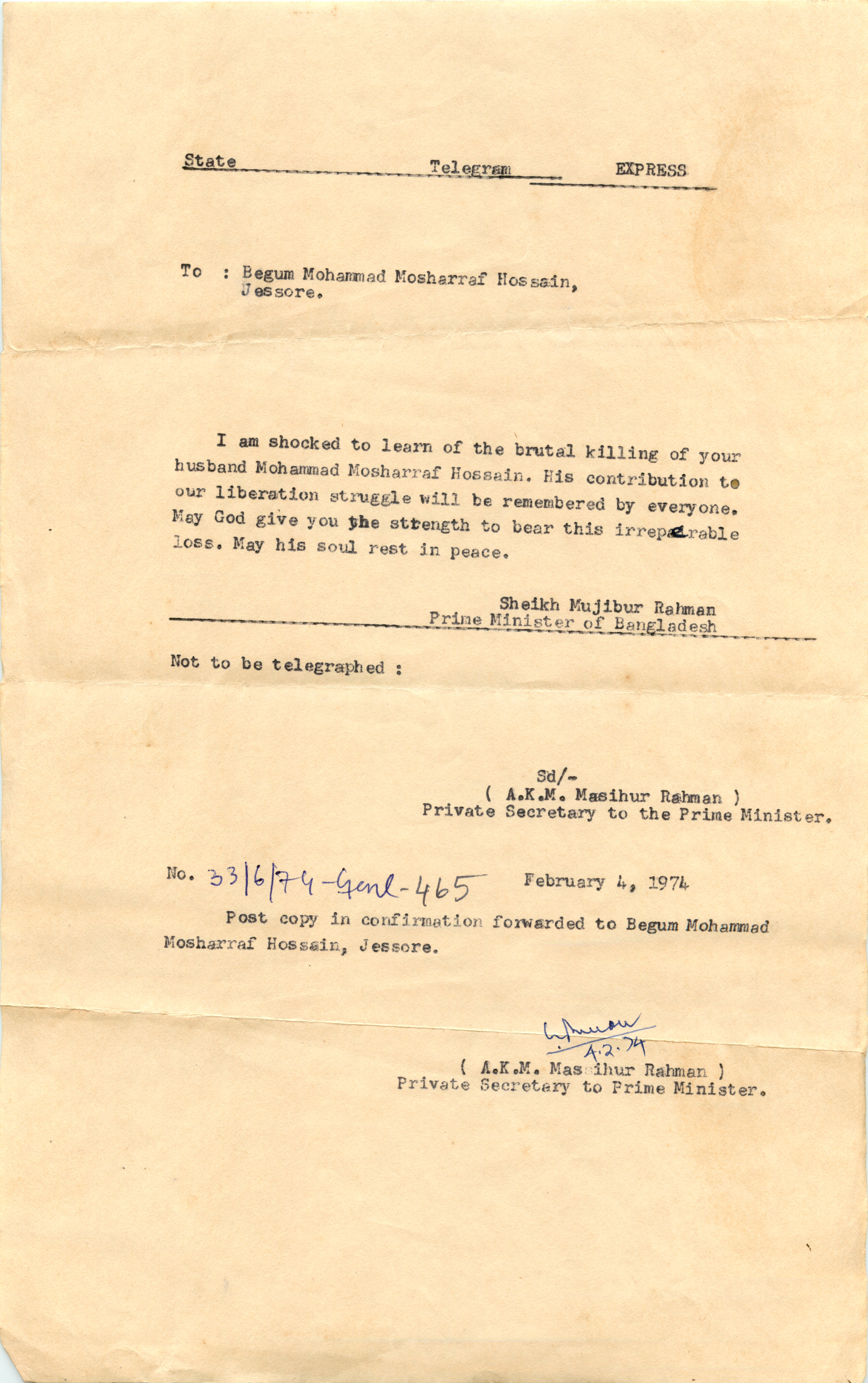
Message of Condolence from prime minister Sheikh Mujibur Rahman after the death of Mosharraf Hossain.

Mosharraf Hossain was assassinated by a gang of unknown armed operatives on 3 February 1974. He was gunned down to death at his residence by masked assailants while talking with his political associates. At that time, Mosharraf was the vice president of Bangladesh JSD. The party organized a general strike in Jessore, demonstrations in Dhaka, and nationwide protests decrying the brutal killing.

Political leaders, including Prime Minister "Bangabandhu" Sheikh Mujibur Rahman, expressed their shock and condolences. In a message to the deceased's family, the Mujib wrote - "His contribution to our liberation struggle will be remembered by everyone." However, JSD President Major Jalil alleged that Mosharraf’s assassination was orchestrated by those in power. Jasad's member of the parliament, Abdus Sattar, called for an 'adjournment motion' in the National Parliament regarding Musharraf's murder, but his request was denied by acting Home Minister Mansur Ali and Speaker Abdul Malek Ukil.

The Intercontinental Press, the official publication of the international Trotskyist political organization Fourth International, cited the assassination as a striking example of Mujib's oppression of political opposition. Other international news outlets, including the Pulitzer-winning St. Louis Post-Dispatch and the Cincinnati Post, also reported on the news, describing it as the death of a socialist leader.

Mosharraf Hossain's daughter Raoshan Jahan Sathi was a member of the 9th Parliament of Bangladesh. His son-in-law Kazi Aref Ahmed was one of the organizers of the Bangladesh Liberation war.
