= Gazi Abdul Hai =

Bangladeshi politician

- গাজী আব্দুল হাই

Member of the Bangladesh Parliament for Jessore-3
- In office 25 April 1988 – 6 December 1990
- Preceded by: Mohammad Khaledur Rahman Tito
- Succeeded by: Raushan Ali

Personal details
- Died: 2012 Dhaka, Bangladesh

Gazi Abdul Hai (died 2012) was a Bangladeshi politician who was the member of parliament for the Jessore-3 constituency from 1988 to 1990.

== Career ==
Gazi Abdul Hai fought for independence in the Bangladesh Liberation War. He was elected to parliament from Jessore-3 in the 1988 Bangladeshi general election. As of 2005, he was a member of the Awami League.

He died in 2012 in Dhaka.
