= Kharua Rajapur =

- Village
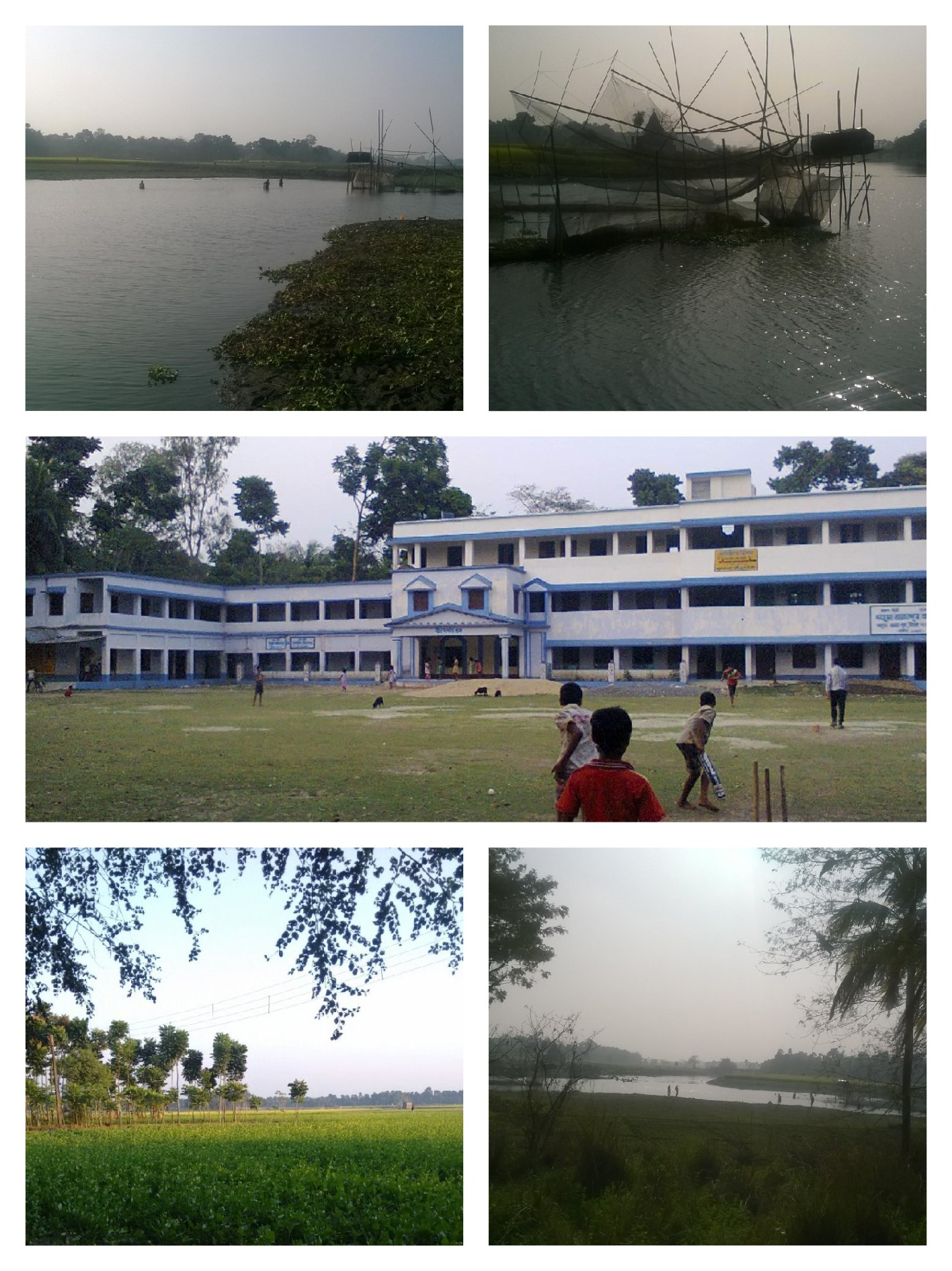

- Location in West Bengal, India Kharua Rajapur (India)
- Coordinates: 22.99479°N 88.753568°E
- Country: India
- State: West Bengal
- Division: Presidency
- District: North 24 Parganas

Government
  - Panchayet Pradhan: Hema Biswas (TMC)

Area
  - Total: 2.33 km^{2} (0.90 sq mi)
- Elevation: 9 m (30 ft)

Population (2011)
  - Total: 1,591
  - Density: 683/km^{2} (1,770/sq mi)

Languages
  - Official: Bengali, English
- Time zone: UTC+5.30 (IST)
- PIN: 743251
- Telephone/STD code: 03215
- ISO 3166 code: IN-WB
- Lok Sabha constituency: Bangaon
- Vidhan Sabha constituency: Bangaon Uttar
- Website: north24parganas.nic.in

Kharua Rajapur is a village in Bangaon CD Block in Bangaon subdivision of North 24 Parganas district in the Indian state of West Bengal.

== Geography ==
Kharua Rajapur is 15 kilometres (9.3 mi) from subdivision headquarters Bangaon and 52 kilometres (32 mi) from district headquarters Barasat. The nearest railway station is Chandpara railway station at Chandpara.

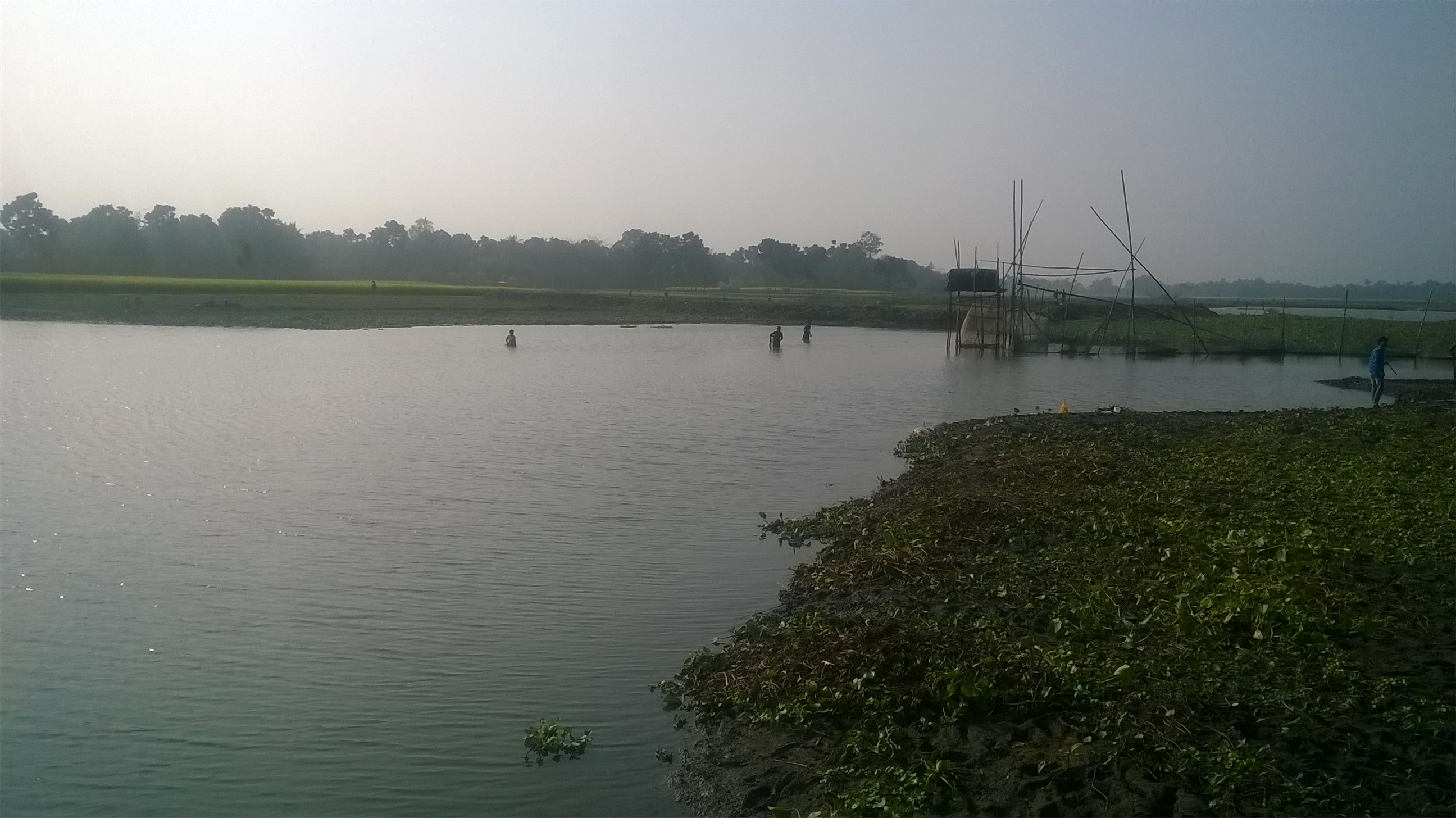
Choita River at Kharua Rajapur

The Choita River flows past Kharua Rajapur.

== Demographics ==
In the 2011 census Kharua Rajapur had a population of 1591, of which 813 were males and 778 were females. Children age 0-6 number 151. The literacy rate is 89.93.

== Education ==
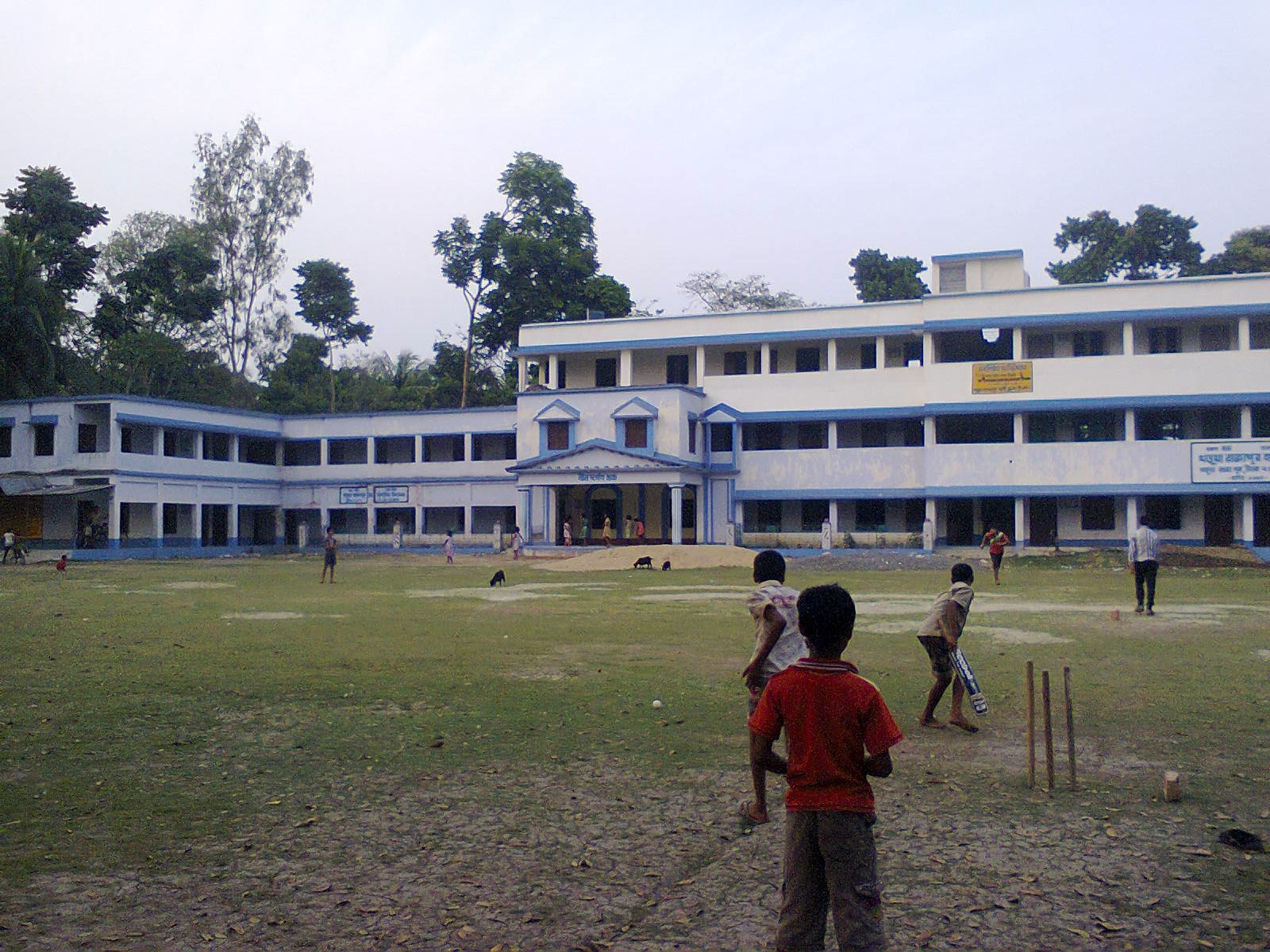
Maine building of Kharua Rajapur High School

One higher secondary school and two primary schools operate in Kharua Rajapur:

- Kharua Rajapur High School (H.S)
- G.R.F.P Primary School
- S.S.K.M Primary School
