= Nil Ratan Dhar =

Indian professor of soil science (1892–1986)

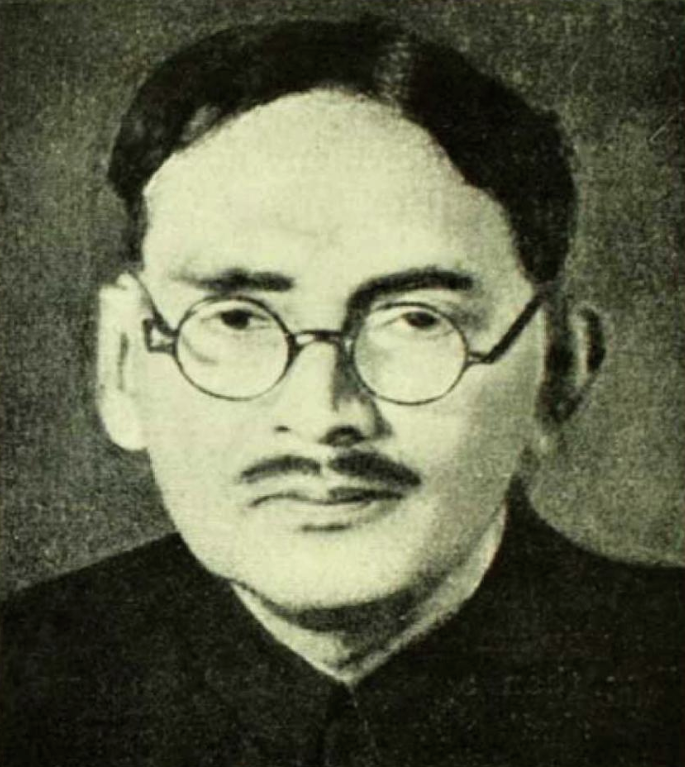
- Born: 2 January 1892; Jolkhada, British India (now Jessore, Bangladesh)
- Died: 5 December 1986 (aged 94); Calcutta, West Bengal, India
- Education: University of London; Calcutta University; Sorbonne University
- Known for: Discovery of the process of thermal and photochemical fixation of atmospheric nitrogen in the soil; Dhar's theory of Photo-chemical Nitrogen Fixation; Father of Indian Physical Chemistry
- Relatives: Jiban Ratan Dhar
- Awards: Griffith Prize; Asiatic Society Award
- Scientific career
- Fields: Physical Chemistry, Soil Science
- Workplaces: University of Allahabad

Nil Ratan Dhar FNA, FRSC (2 January 1892 – 5 December 1986) was an Indian professor of soil science and chemistry at the University of Allahabad, known for discovering thermal and photo-chemical fixation of atmospheric nitrogen in the soil. He was the brother of a freedom fighter Jiban Ratan Dhar. He was known as the "father of Indian physical chemistry." Dhar was a founding member of many scientific organizations like The World Academy of Sciences, the National Academy of Sciences, India and the Sheila Dhar Institute of Soil Science, Allahabad.

== Early life and education ==
He was born on 2 January 1892 in Jolkhada, British India (now Jessore, Bangladesh) to Prassana Kumar Dhar, a lawyer, his grandfather, Prem Chand Dhar, was a Zamindar of the place. and his mother Nirode Mohini Dhar, the daughter of a local zamindar.

He obtained his DSc from University of London in 1917. In 1919, he earned a doctorate of science in France. He was awarded honorary DCs from Banaras Hindu University, University of Allahabad, Jadavpur University, Gorakhpur University and Visva-Bharati University.

== Awards and memberships ==
Dhar was elected a fellow of the Chemical Society of London (FCS) and the Institute of Chemistry (later the Royal Institute of Chemistry) in 1919. (Note: Both institutions merged in 1980 as part of the formation of the Royal Society of Chemistry (RSC); the post-nominal became "FRSC" from that time.) In 1935, he was appointed a Foundation Fellow of the National Institute of Sciences of India (FNI, now the Indian National Science Academy. (Note: Prior to 1970, the Indian National Science Academy was named the "National Institute of Sciences of India", and its fellows bore the post-nominal "FNI". The post-nominal became "FNA" in 1970 when the association adopted its present name.) Dhar was a corresponding member of the Academy of Sciences, France and a foreign member of the French Academy of Agriculture. He was nominated for the Nobel Prize four times. He was also a founding member of the Indian Chemical Society and the National Academy of Sciences, India, and the president of both organizations from 1933 to 1934 and 1935–1937 respectively. Though not a founding member, he also served as the president of the Indian Society of Soil Sciences. Dhar was also a member of the Society of Biological Chemists, India. In 1961, he became the General President of the Indian Science Congress Association.
