= Mohammad Khaledur Rahman Tito =

Bangladeshi politician (1945–2021)

- খালেদুর রহমান টিটো

Member of Parliament for Jessore-3
- In office 10 July 1986 – 6 December 1987
- Preceded by: Ebadot Hossain Mondal
- Succeeded by: Abdul Hai
- In office 25 January 2009 – 20 November 2013
- Preceded by: Tariqul Islam
- Succeeded by: Kazi Nabil Ahmed

Personal details
- Born: 1 March 1945 Kolkata, Bengal Presidency, British India
- Died: 10 January 2021 (aged 75) Jessore, Bangladesh
- Party: Bangladesh Awami League
- Other political affiliations: Jatiya Party (Ershad)
- Parent: Habibur Rahman (father)

Mohammad Khaledur Rahman Tito (1 March 1945 – 10 January 2021) was a Bangladeshi politician. He served as a Jatiya Sangsad member as a Jatiya Party member during 1986–1988 and a Bangladesh Awami League member during 2009–2013 representing the Jessore-3 constituency.

== Early life ==
Tito passed his matriculation in 1960 and intermediate exams in 1963 from Quaid e Azam College (now Government Shaheed Suhrawardy College) in Dhaka in the then East Pakistan. He then graduated from Michael Madhusudan College in Jessore in 1967 from jail.

Tito joined politics at Chhatra Union in Michael Madhusudan College in 1963. He then got involved with left-leaning workers' politics in 1967.

== Career ==
Tito was elected Jessore municipality chairman in 1984 and was elected a member of Jatiya Sangsad from Jatiya Party in 1986. Next year, he took charge as organising secretary of the central Jatiya Party. In 1990, he was appointed as the state minister for Labour and Man Power ministry. After the fall of Hussain Muhammad Ershad ruling, he was put in jail in 1991. At the end of 1991, Tito was made the secretary general (in charge) of Jatiya Party.

Tito joined Bangladesh Awami League on 9 March 2006. He was elected to Parliament from Jessore-3 on 29 December 2008 as a candidate of Bangladesh Awami League. On 22 April 2009 he sued former Minister Tarikul Islam, also publisher of Daily Loksamaj, for defamation. His house in Jessore was attacked in March 2015.
