= Choita River =

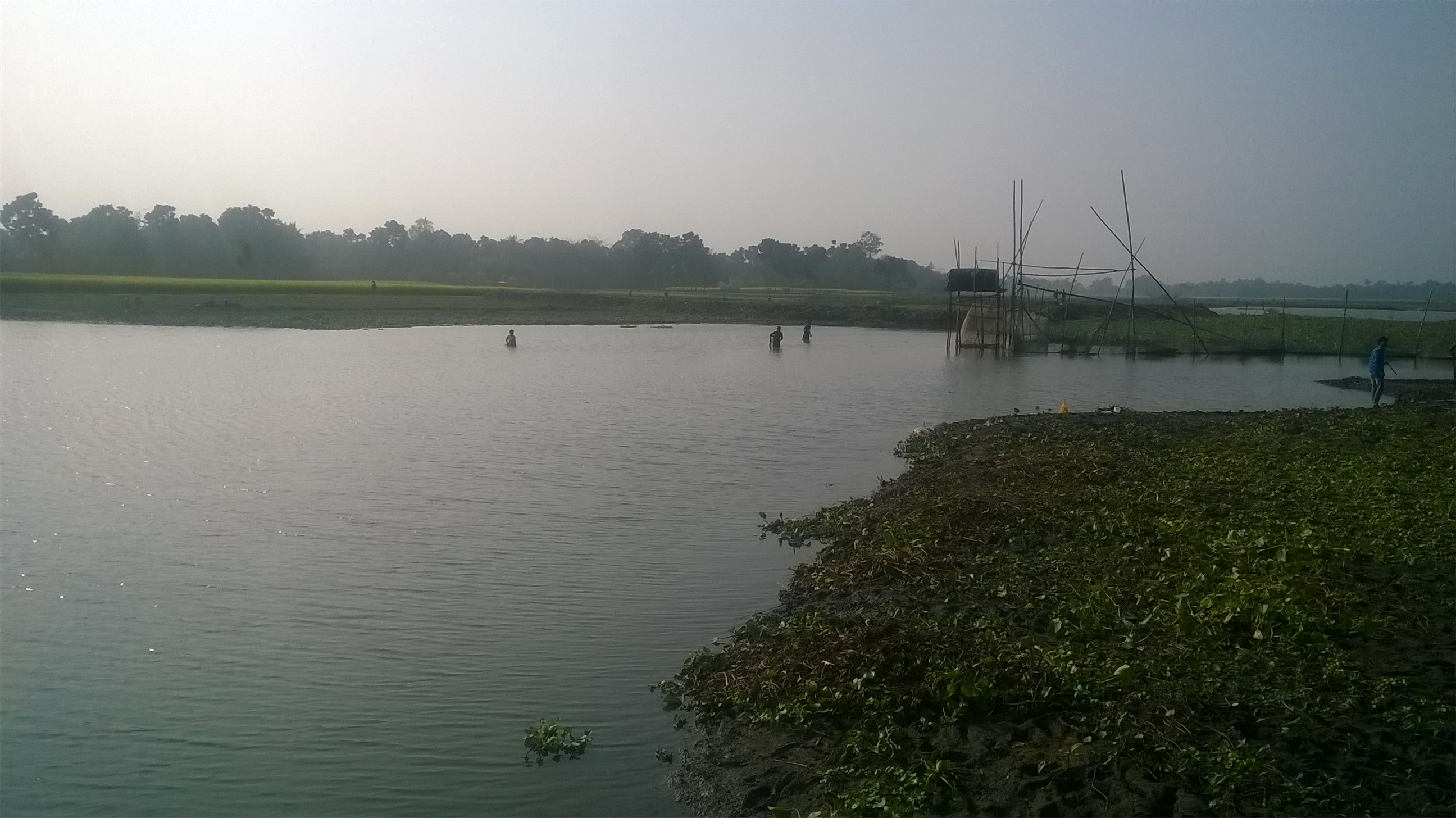
- Choita River in Kharua Rajapur
- Native name: চৈতা নদী (Bengali)

Location
- Country: India

Physical characteristics
- Source
  - location: Ichamati River
- Mouth
  - location: Jamuna River
- Length: 40 km (25 mi)

Basin features
- River system: Ganges River System

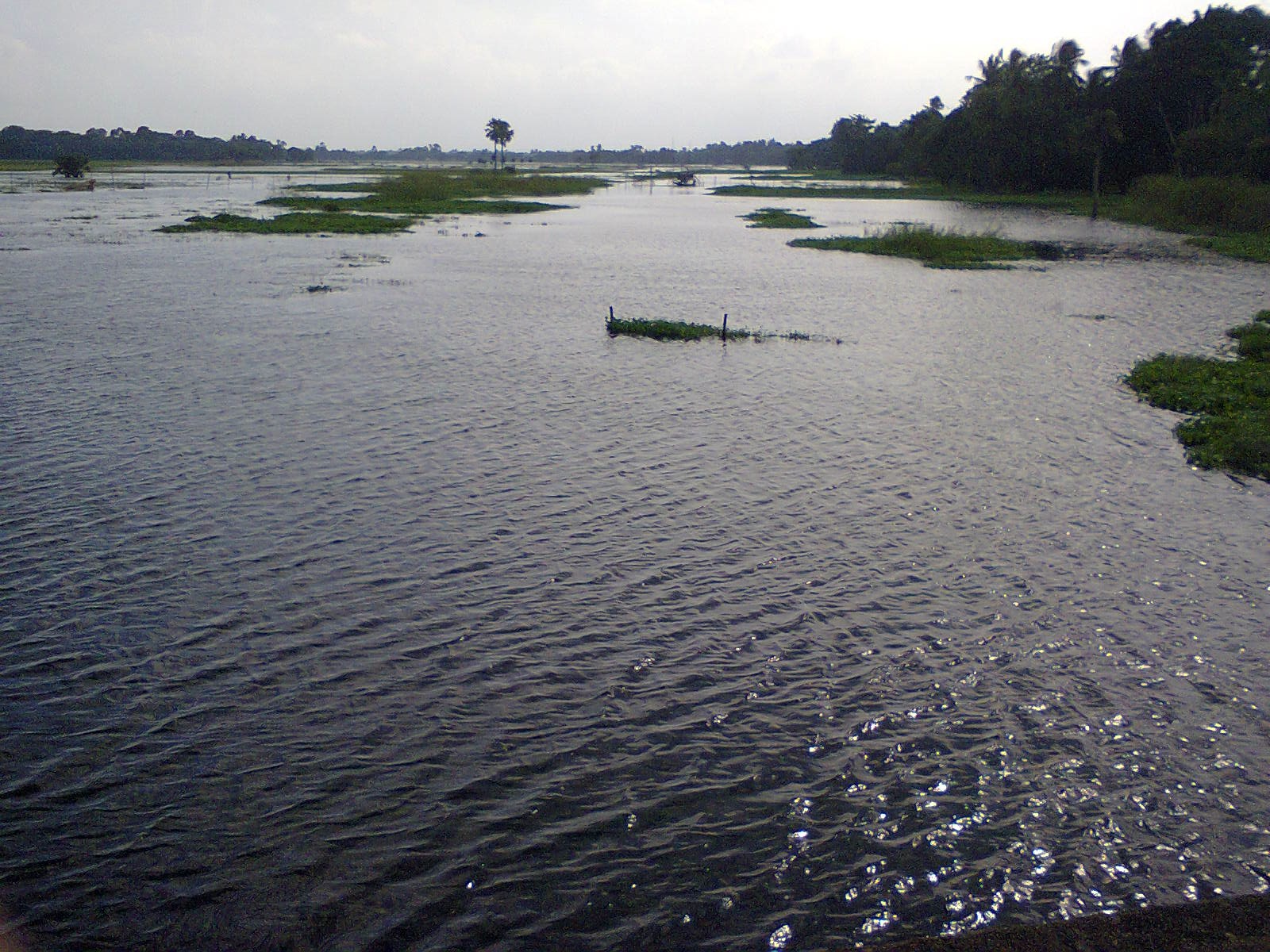
The Choita River in the monsoon season, from the Kharua Rajapur Bridge

The Choita River (Bengali: বাংলায়: চৈতা নদী) flows west and south of Kharua Rajapur. Choita River is a branch of Ichamati river. Choita River debouches into the Jamuna River in Gaighata. The length of the river is 40 km. The river is currently separated from the Ichamati river at the debouch and the river has lost its normal flow speed due to flooding. A wetland to the east side of village had been transformed into productive farmland. Agriculture made wealth, and wealth made Kharua Rajapur areas. Fish embankments are being constructed and fish are being cultivated by splitting the river bed, blocking the river flow. During summer, fish food is available in the river. A crocodile jaw was found at Kinarmath village while excavating this river. Farmers grow crops which they export to other states and many villagers travel to work outside the area. So fertile is the soil here that anyone who owns just a few acres can earn a decent living. Villagers grow enough rice for their own needs. Here the Choita is rich in wildlife. A combination of climatic change and hunting pressure has reduced many animals. The Chaita provided an abundance of food all kharua rajapurian waited in anticipation of an infusion from this artery of life. Every monsoon rains saturate the land and swell the river. Rajapurian built their civilization with the wealth generated by grain. This river is merged with another important river called Chalundia river in the Gaighata area.

== River flow ==
The Choita River is part of the Ganges River system. The river is 40 km long and merges with the Jamuna River in Gaighata. The river crosses Gopalnagar, Talikhola, Khedaitala, Chaitapara, Kharua Rajapur, Kinarmath, Rampur, etc. in the way of flow. All these are associated with the agricultural activities of the land along the river. An influx of tide can be seen in the flow of the river from Gaighata to the northern part of the village of Kharua Rajapur.

== Floods ==
The river produces floods every year during the monsoon season. Floods cause the river to overflow. From August to September 2000, a severe flood occurred on the banks of this river. This flood is known to the people of this region as the 2000 India–Bangladesh floods. The river was also flooded in 2010 and 2015. Every year, the crops gets destroyed by the floodwaters of the river. At present, the river is in demand for renovation.

== Biodiversity ==
There are plenty of freshwater fish, such as Channa striata, lyata, walking catfish, sini, Kai stingaree, nayana, pakala, grass carp, rohu, mrigal, Asian swamp eel, swamp barb, khalase, etc. Aquatic birds such as heron, little cormorant, openbill stork and weavers are also found. In winter, the birds come to the river adjacent to this river.
