= Raoshan Jahan Sathi =

Bangladeshi politician

- রওশন জাহান সাথী

Member of Bangladesh Parliament
- In office 2009–2014

Personal details
- Born: 8 May 1951 (age 75) Jessore
- Party: Bangladesh Awami League
- Spouse: Kazi Aref Ahmed
- Parent: Mosharraf Hossain (Jessore politician)
- Education: Jessore Govt. Girls High School; Jessore Mahila College; University of Dhaka

Raoshan Jahan Sathi is a Bangladesh Awami League politician and a former member of parliament from a reserved seat. She was also involved with Jatiya Samajtantrik Dal.

== Early life and family ==
Sathi was born on 8 May 1951 in Jashore city. Her father, Mosharraf Hossain, was elected in the 1970 East Pakistan Provincial Assembly election from Awami League and was a member of the Constituent Assembly of Bangladesh. Her husband, Kazi Aref Ahmed, was one of the organizers of the Bangladesh Liberation war. Both her father and husband were founding members of Jatiya Samajtantrik Dal and were assassinated in 1974 and 1999.

== Career ==
Sathi got involved in politics at an early age. In 1968, she became the president of the Jessore Mahakuma student wing of Awami League (East Pakistan Chattra League). She was also a member of the underground political group Swadhin Bangla Biplobi Parishad, a separatist organization preparing for an armed struggle for the independence of Pakistan's eastern province (current Bangladesh). She actively participated in the 1969 mass uprising in East Pakistan.

On 25 March 1971, the Pakistan army attacked the house in Jessore city where Raoshan Jahan and her family lived. She was arrested on 27 March for her involvement in the separatist movement. However, she was able to escape after a few days and crossed the India-Pakistan border to reach Bangaon, West Bengal. During the liberation war of Bangladesh, the 20-year-old Sathi served as a relief worker, distributed pro-liberation pamphlets, and worked with the Bangladesh Liberation Force (BLF).

Raoshan Jahan was a student of Dhaka University and participated in the Dhaka University Central Students' Union (DUCSU) election in 1973. She was elected as the VP of Ruqayyah Hall. However, the election result could not be published officially because of the looting of ballot boxes.

Sathi was elected to the 9th Parliament of Bangladesh from a reserved seat as a Bangladesh Awami League candidate in 2009. She was the founding President of Bangladesh Mohila Sramik League and was in the post till 2019. She also served on the central committee of Bangladesh Jatiya Sramik League and was engaged with organizations like International Labour Organization (ILO). She is a member of the Bangladesh Institute of Labour Studies (BILS) advisory council.
