= Habibur Rahman (Jessore politician) =

Bengali politician (1910–1955)

Habibur Rahman (Bengali: হাবিবুর রহমান; 1910 – 6 September 1955) was a politician and lawyer from Jashore, Bangladesh. He is notable for his involvement in the Bengali language movement.

== Early life ==
Habibur was born in 1910 in Bangaon, which was then a Mahakuma of the greater Jessore district.

== Career ==
Habibur studied law in Kolkata and began practicing professionally in Jessore in 1937. He was politically associated with A. K. Fazlul Huq-led faction of the Muslim League. After the formation of East Pakistan Awami Muslim League (former name of Awami League) in 1949, he became the first president of its Jessore district committee. In 1948, he was a member of the National Language Action Committee in Jessore, which demanded that the government recognize Bengali as a state language of Pakistan. Due to his leading role in the Bengali language movement, he was arrested and sent to jail for conspiring against the state in April of the same year. Although lawyer Mashiur Rahman made efforts to obtain bail for him, bail was denied, and Mashiur Rahman was arrested instead. Meanwhile, several detained language movement activists started a hunger strike in the jail to protest mistreatment. The former chief minister of Bengal, Huseyn Shaheed Suhrawardy, decided to come to Jessore from Kolkata to deal with the situation. Under these circumstances, Habibur was released from jail on 19 April.

Habibur Rahman died on 6 September 1955. His son, Khaledur Rahman Tito, was a former minister and parliament member. His younger brother, Mosharraf Hossain, was actively involved in the Liberation War of Bangladesh and the founding vice-president of JASOD.
