= J. K. M. A. Aziz =

Bangladeshi politician

Member of Parliament for Jessore-3
- In office 1973–1975
- Preceded by: Constituency Established
- Succeeded by: Mohammad Ebadot Hossain Mondal

Personal details
- Died: 16 December 2014
- Occupation: Politician

J. K. M. A. Aziz (died 2014) was a Bangladesh Awami League politician. He was elected as Member of Parliament for Jessore-3 in 1973.

== Career ==
Aziz was elected to the National Assembly of Pakistan in 1970 from Jhenaidah District (then part of greater Jessore District) as an Awami League candidate. He participated in the Bangladesh Liberation war in 1971. He was elected to Parliament in 1973 from Jessore-3 as a Bangladesh Awami League candidate. He served as the governor of Jhenaidah District in the BAKSAL government. After the Assassination of Sheikh Mujibur Rahman in 1975, he was imprisoned for one year by the new regime.

== Death ==
Aziz died on 16 December 2014 in Jhenaidah, Bangladesh.
