= Jessore-3 =

Constituency of Bangladesh's Jatiya Sangsad

Coordinates: 23.16°N 89.21°E

- Constituency for the Jatiya Sangsad
- District: Jessore District
- Division: Khulna Division
- Electorate: 523,340 (2018)

Current constituency
- Created: 1973
- Party: BNP
- Member of Parliament: Anindya Islam Amit
- ← 86 Jessore-2 88 Jessore-4 →

Jessore-3 is a constituency represented in the Jatiya Sangsad (National Parliament) of Bangladesh. The newly elected member of parliament is Anindya Islam Amit.

== Boundaries ==
The constituency encompasses all but one union parishad of Jessore Sadar Upazila: Basundia.

== History ==
The constituency was created for the first general elections in newly independent Bangladesh, held in 1973.

Ahead of the 2008 general election, the Election Commission redrew constituency boundaries to reflect population changes revealed by the 2001 Bangladesh census. The 2008 redistricting altered the boundaries of the constituency.

Ahead of the 2014 general election, the Election Commission expanded the boundaries of the constituency. Previously it excluded four more union parishads of Jessore Sadar Upazila: Fathehpur, Ichhali, Kachua, and Narendrapur.

== Members of Parliament ==
Election	Member	Party
1973	J. K. M. A. Aziz	Awami League
1979	Mohammad Ebadot Hossain Mondal	BNP
Major Boundary Changes
1986	Mohammad Khaledur Rahman Tito	Jatiya Party
1988	Gazi Abdul Hai	Combined Opposition Party
1991	Raushan Ali	Awami League
Feb 1996	Tariqul Islam	BNP
Jun 1996	Ali Reza Raju	Awami League
2001	Tariqul Islam	BNP
2008	Mohammad Khaledur Rahman Tito	Awami League
2014	Kazi Nabil Ahmed	Awami League
2026	Anindya Islam Amit	BNP

== Elections ==
=== Elections in the 2010s ===
Kazi Nabil Ahmed was elected unopposed in the 2014 general election after opposition parties withdrew their candidacies in a boycott of the election.

=== Elections in the 2000s ===
General Election 2008: Jessore-3
Party	Candidate	Votes	%	±%
AL	Mohammad Khaledur Rahman Tito	166,192	56.9	+20.0
BNP	Tariqul Islam	122,549	42.0	−8.4
Independent	Md. Ahsan Kabir	2,540	0.9	N/A
CPB	Ilahdat Khan	632	0.2	N/A
Jatiya Samajtantrik Dal-JSD	Kazi Ali Hider	181	0.1	N/A
Majority		43,643	14.9	+1.4
Turnout		292,094	84.1	+2.7
AL gain from BNP				

General Election 2001: Jessore-3
Party	Candidate	Votes	%	±%
BNP	Tariqul Islam	147,825	50.4	+22.3
AL	Ali Reza Raju	108,174	36.9	+4.4
Independent	Kazi Shahed Ahmed	20,488	7.0	N/A
IJOF	Md. Mahabubul Alam	15,649	5.3	N/A
WPB	Haroon-or-Rashid	614	0.2	−0.1
BKA	Md. Touhiduzzaman	329	0.1	N/A
KSJL	Abul Kalam Mostafa	224	0.1	N/A
Samridhya Bangladesh Andolan	A. B. M. Kamrul Hasan	168	0.1	N/A
Majority		39,651	13.5	+9.2
Turnout		293,471	81.4	0.0
BNP gain from AL				

=== Elections in the 1990s ===
General Election June 1996: Jessore-3
Party	Candidate	Votes	%	±%
AL	Ali Reza Raju	75,769	32.5	+0.3
BNP	Tariqul Islam	65,634	28.1	−4.0
JP(E)	Mohammad Khaledur Rahman Tito	63,438	27.2	+11.1
Jamaat	Md. Ruhul Quddus Khan	19,363	8.3	−4.5
IOJ	Md. Abdul Jalil	8,257	3.5	−0.2
WPB	Harun-or-Rashid	769	0.3	N/A
Majority		10,135	4.3	+4.1
Turnout		233,230	81.4	+12.4
AL hold				

General Election 1991: Jessore-3
Party	Candidate	Votes	%	±%
AL	Raushan Ali	56,883	32.2	
BNP	Tariqul Islam	56,586	32.1	
JP(E)	Mohammad Khaledur Rahman Tito	28,483	16.1	
Jamaat	Khodadad Khan	22,559	12.8	
IOJ	Anwarul Karim	6,588	3.7	
Zaker Party	Zahid Hasan Tukun	4,424	2.5	
WPB	Nurul Alam	984	0.6	
Majority		297	0.2	
Turnout		176,507	69.0	
AL gain from				
