= Tariqul Islam =

Bangladeshi politician (1946–2018)

- তরিকুল ইসলাম
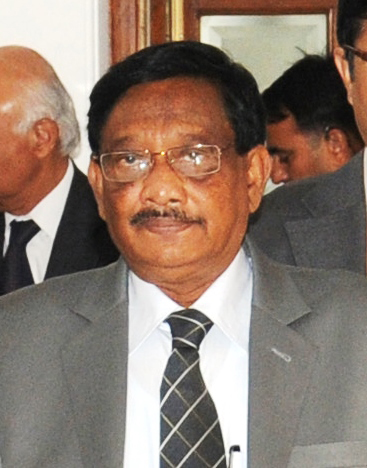

Minister of Food
- In office 10 October 2001 – 11 March 2002
- Preceded by: Amir Hossain Amu
- Succeeded by: Abdullah Al Noman

Minister of Information
- In office 11 March 2002 – 6 May 2004
- Preceded by: Abdul Moyeen Khan
- Succeeded by: Shamsul Islam

Minister of Environment and Forest
- In office 6 May 2004 – 29 October 2006
- Preceded by: Shajahan Siraj
- Succeeded by: Mostafizur Rahman Fizar

Member of Parliament for Jessore-3
- In office 28 October 2001 – 27 October 2006
- Succeeded by: Mohammad Khaledur Rahman Tito
- In office 19 March 1996 – 30 March 1996
- Preceded by: Raushan Ali
- Succeeded by: Ali Reza Raju

Personal details
- Born: 16 November 1946 Jessore, Bengal Presidency, British India
- Died: 4 November 2018 (aged 71) Dhaka, Bangladesh
- Party: Bangladesh Nationalist Party
- Spouse: Nargis Islam
- Children: 2, including Anindya Islam Amit

Tariqul Islam (16 November 1946 – 4 November 2018) was a Bangladesh Nationalist Party politician. He served as the cabinet minister of Ministry of Food, Ministry of Information and Ministry of Environment and Forest in the Third Khaleda Zia cabinet. He represented the Jessore-3 constituency in the 6th and 8th Jatiya Sangsad.

== Political life ==
Tariqul got the dilapidated Shaheed Minar of Michael Madhusudan College repaired in Jessore in 1962 and was arrested by the then military government. He served as the general secretary of the Satra Union of Michael Madhusudan College as a candidate of the students' union in the academic year 1963–1964.

He was imprisoned in Rajshahi and Jessore for nine months in 1968 for his anti-Ayub movement. While at Rajshahi University, he was again imprisoned for leading the mass uprising of 1968.

He joined the National Awami Party led by Abdul Hamid Khan Bhasani in 1970. He actively participated in the liberation war. From the National Awami Party, he first joined the Nationalist Democratic Party and then Ziaur Rahman's Bangladesh Nationalist Party. He was one of the seventy six members of the first convening committee of the BNP. He was the founding convener of Jessore District Bangladesh Nationalist Party.

In 1980, he served as chairman of the Nationalist Party. He was also elected joint secretary general, acting secretary general, vice chairman of the BNP and a member of the standing committee of the fifth council of the Bangladesh Nationalist Party in 2009.

== Career ==
Islam was a standing committee member of Bangladesh Nationalist Party (BNP). He served as the minister of information in the third Khaleda Zia cabinet.

== Personal life ==
Islam had two sons, Shantonu Islam Sumit and Aninda Islam Amit. Amit is an assistant organising secretary of the BNP.

Islam died at Apollo Hospital in Dhaka on 4 November 2018. He had been suffering from kidney related complications and diabetes.
