= Bibhas Roy Chowdhury =

Bengali poet writer and novelist

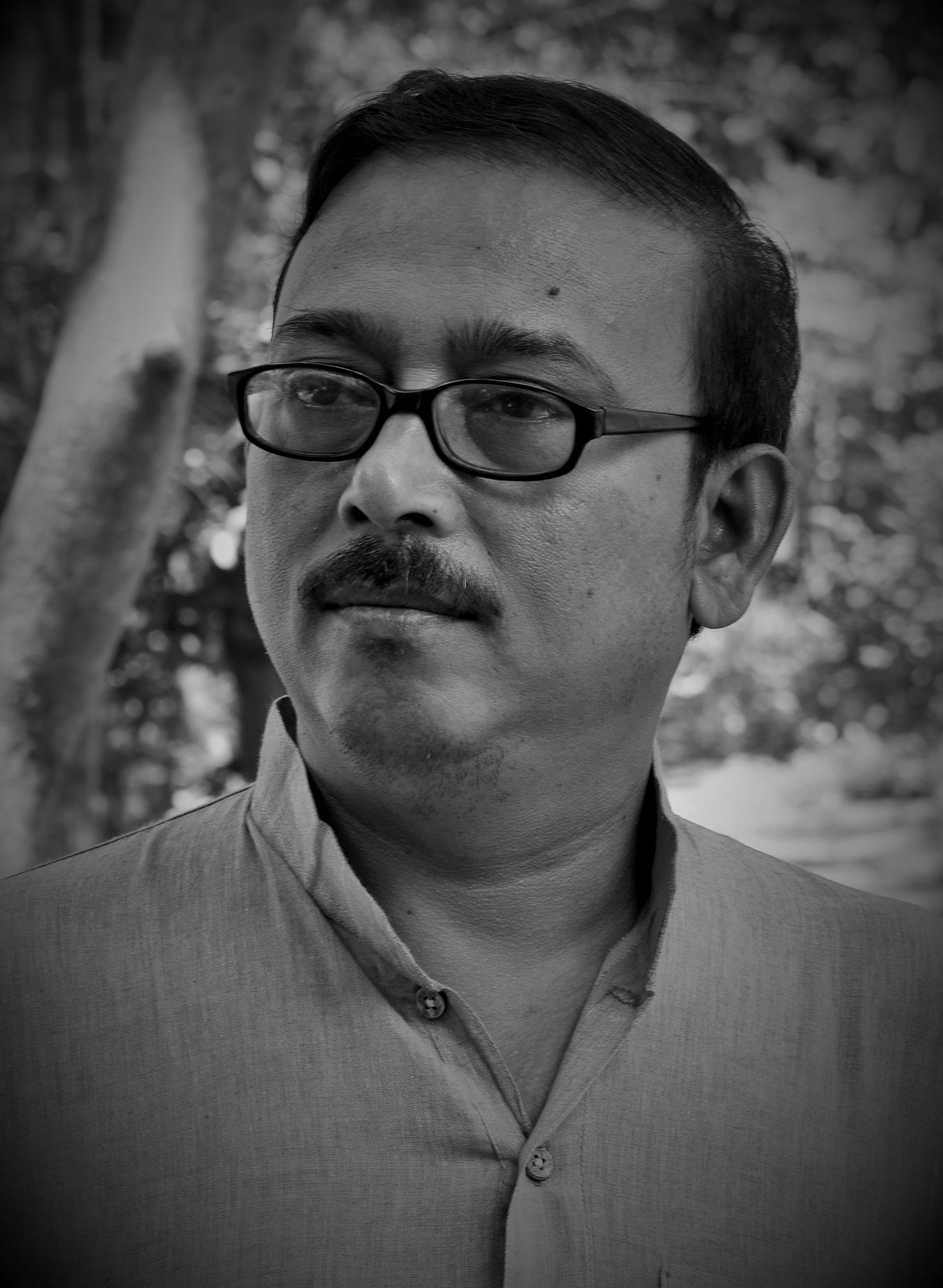
- Bibhas Roy Chowdhury in 2018
- Born: 1 August 1968 (age 58); Bongaon, West Bengal, India
- Education: Gobardanga Hindu College
- Occupations: Poet, novelist, essayist
- Spouse: Kakali Roychowdhury
- Children: Mrittika Shabnam Roychowdhury
- Writing career
- Language: Bengali
- Notable awards: Krittibas Award (1997), Bangla Academy Award (2013), Nirmal Acharya Gold Medal

Signature
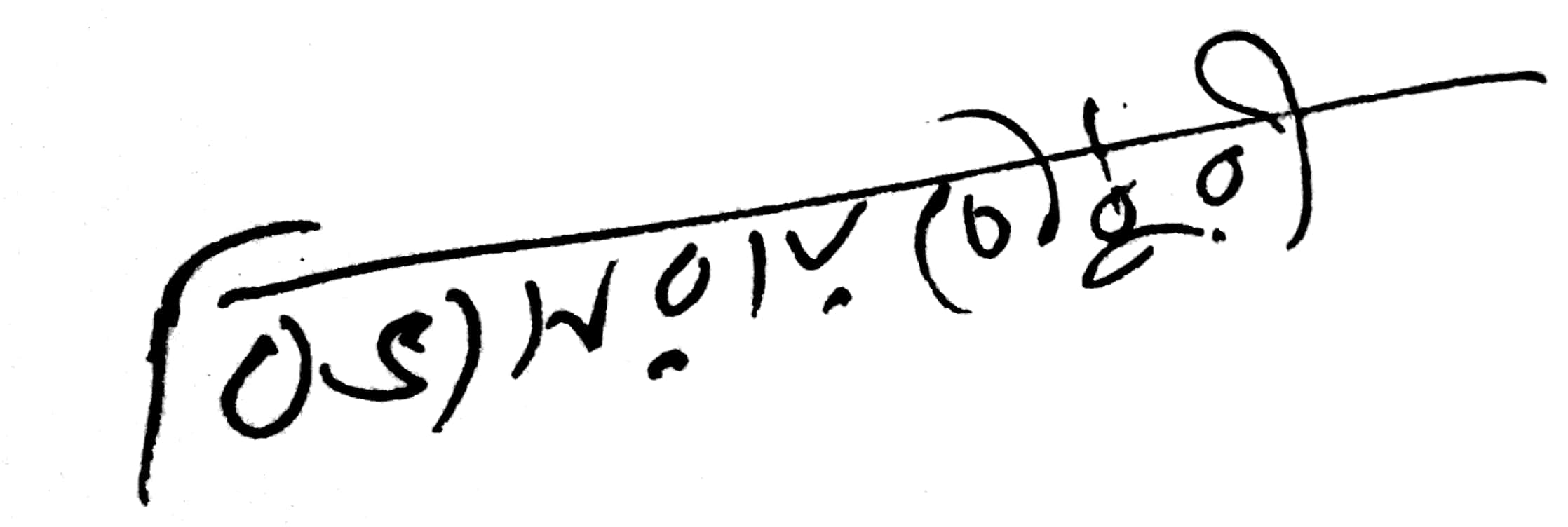

Bibhas Roy Chowdhury (Bengali: বিভাস রায়চৌধুরী; born 1 August 1968) is a Bengali poet, novelist, and essayist. He is the author of more than twenty books including seven novels and numerous essays in various Bengali literary magazines. He received awards including Bangla Academy Award (Paschimbanga Bangla Akademi) in 2013, Krittibas Award (1997), Binay Mazumdar Puraskar in 2020 by Paschimbanga Kabita Academy, and Nirmal Acharya Gold Medal for poetry. Some of his poems have been translated into English by Dr. Kiriti Sengupta, a well-known poet and translator, and published by Inner Child Press (New Jersey, USA) in association with Hawakal Publishers (Kolkata) as Poem Continuous: Reincarnated Expression (2014). He is also one of the chief advisers of the Bengali literary magazine, Kabita Ashram, and founder member and director of a theatrical troupe named Banga Natya Charcha Kendra. He now works in a publication house, and earns his daily bread by writing and editing.

== Early life ==
Roy Chowdhury was born to a refugee family on 1 August 1968 at Bihutipalli in frontier town Bangaon in the district of North 24 Pargonas in West Bengal in India. His parents, Shyamdulal Roy Chowdhury and Bithika Roy Chowdhury, originally belonged to Bangladesh, were left destitute during the partition of Bengal, and became full-time laborers when they settled in Bongaon, despite being an affluent family in undivided Bangladesh. Roy Chowdhury went to Bongaon High School, and Gobardanga Hindu College. After completing graduation, he could not continue his higher education because of extreme proverty. Since childhood he was keenly interested in music, drama, and poetry. He learned poetry from Usaprasanna Mukhopadyay, a teacher of Bengali literature in Gobardanga Hindu College and from the poet Subhankar Patra. Later, Binoy Majumdar was his mentor.

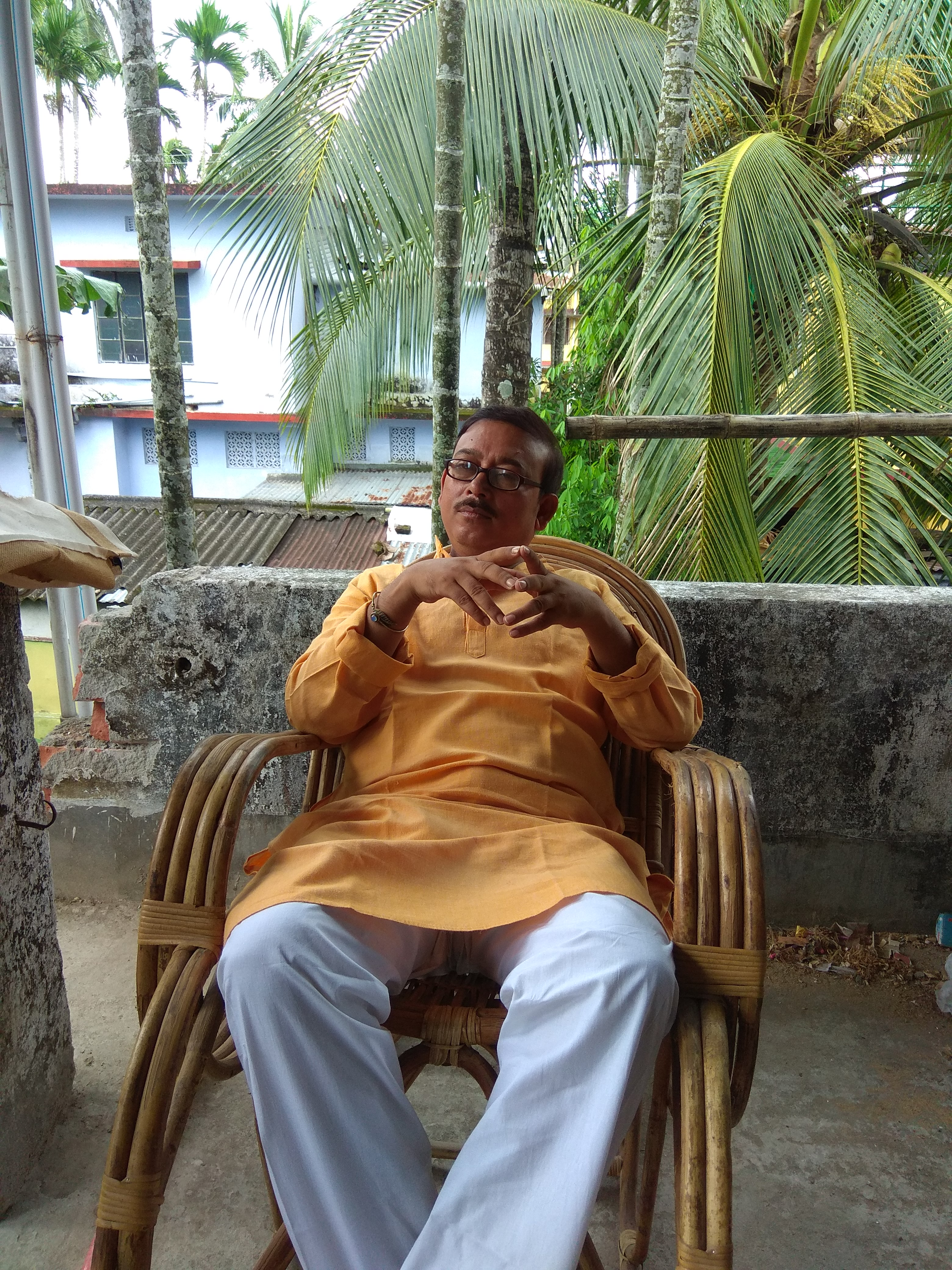
Bishas Roy Chowdhury in 2 018, North Bengal

== Career ==
During the 1980s Roychowdhury's poems regularly appeared in several Bengali literary magazines such as Dainik Basumati, Krittibas, Kabisammelan, and Desh. His first poetry collection, Nasta Prajanmer Vasan (Song of Degraded Generation), was published in 1996 at the Kolkata book fair. He has published books of verse, including Udbastu Shibirer Paakhi (1996), Shimul Vasha, Palash Vasha (1999), Jibanander Meye (2002), Chandalika Gaachh (2006), Ananta Ashram (2015). His novel Ashrudana first appeared in Desh on 4 November 2002. His poems have been anthologized in books such as Hirak Khanda, edited by poet Nirendranath Chakraborty.

== Writing style ==
Roychowdhury writes from life in pithy language, in both metrical and non-metrical verse. In his poems, he often explores the highs and lows of life, the aftermath of partition of Bengal, the struggle of refugee-life, love for native language and the suffering of his fellow people. His recent book of verse, Jashor Roder Gaachh (Trees Either Side of Jessore Road), laments the felling of trees, pollution, and destruction due to selfishness and greed. He uses 'the speech of ordinary men' but his metaphors casts a haunting effect on the readers. He writes in all types of poetic forms, including payar, a metrical form popular in medieval Bengali literature. Earlier in his poetic journey he was influenced by the eminent Bengali poets of 1970s such as Joy Goswami, Shyamal Kanti Das, Mridul Dasgupta, and Nirmal Halder.

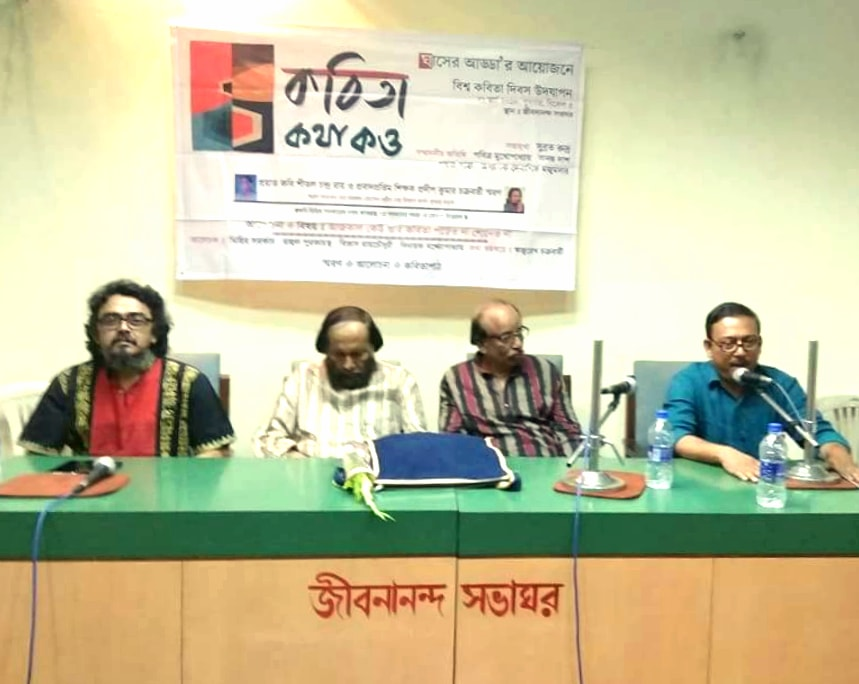
Roychowdhury (extreme right) at Jibananda Sabhaghar, Kolkata on International Poetry Day

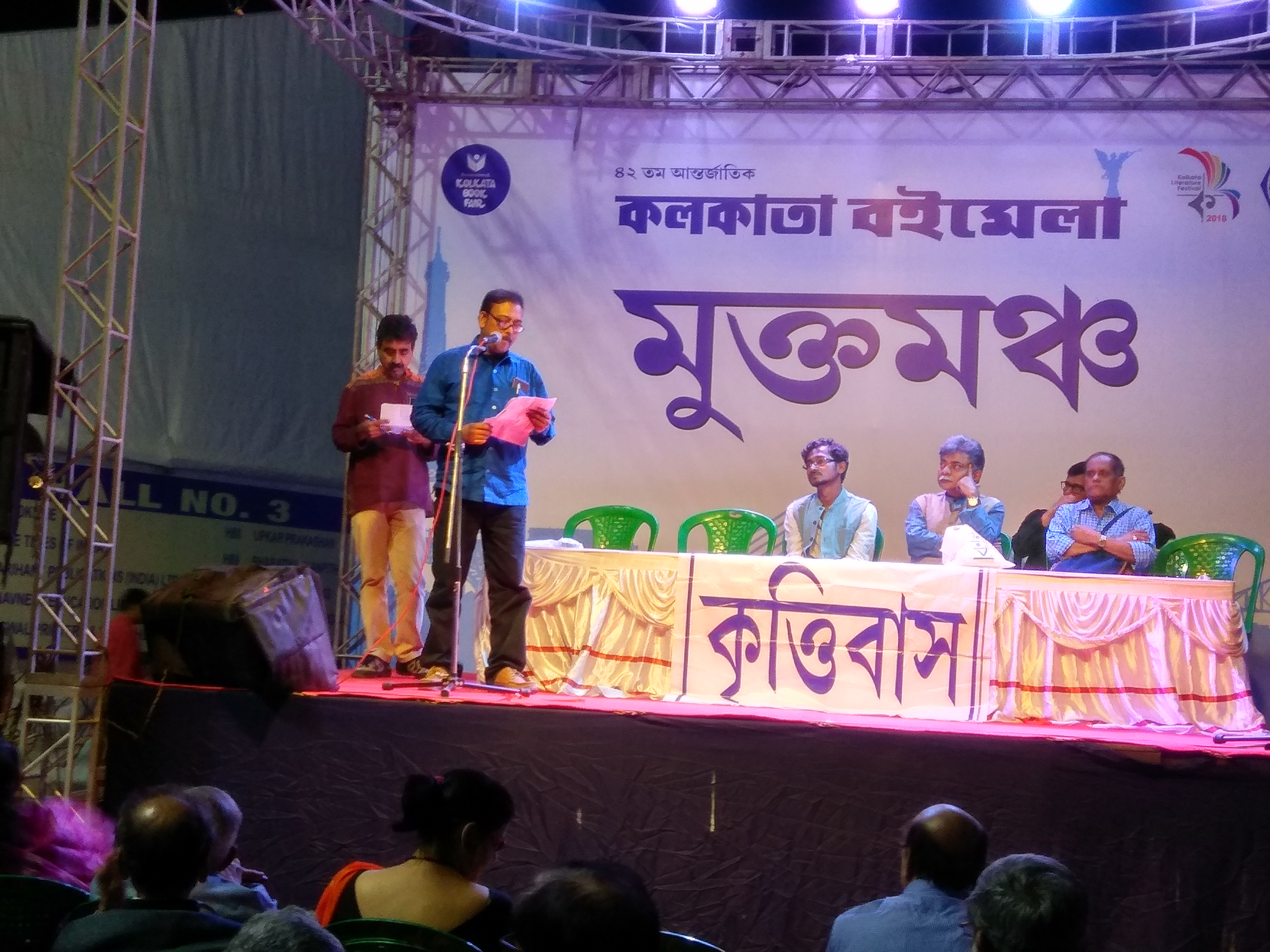
Roychowdhury reading at Kolkata Book Fair 2018

== Critical acclaim ==
Roychowdhury's works earned him wide acclaim early on. Bengali poet Joy Goswami lauded him saying "He is a poet of new empowerment", and Sunil Gangopadhyay saying "Bibhas's poems have provided much support to the livelihood and struggle. Bangladesh prosper in his poems".

A Muse India review (Issue 58, November–December 2014) says, "Roy Chowdhuy's thematic trajectory touches the milestones of death thoughts that loom large, palpable nostalgia and essential poetic sadomasochism, all through ignited by a sense of Bengali-ness with a view to communicating with the readers about their genesis and probable destination. Roy Chowdhury does not emphasize on any monolithic poetic premise: instead his easeful tête-à-tête mood builds up a quick bond with the readers, and why not? He thinks the way the Bengalis think, he lends voice to the habitual Bengali Poetic thoughts. This rare excellence has characterized every piece of his writings that amuses poetry lovers".

The Fox Chase Review says, "Bibhas's voice pulsates with an undercurrent of passion... it is melancholic yet inflected with hope... pithy in words but loaded with sensitivity... it is a reflection of the loneliness of the poet's heart and its aches. To quote Kafka, "(his) pen is the seismograph of (his) heart." I realized that these poems are not for idle reading. I read them once, I read them again and then again each time sinking a little deeper into their profundity, their challenging complexity, and emerged with an 'aha' feeling. That is the beauty of these poems... they plummet you beyond the tips into their inner core and thereby into your own deeper recesses, conversing with your sense of self."

The Red Fez magazine claims (in issue 73), "There is an undercurrent of melancholy in the poems offered in this text. But buoyant optimism of the poet comes to the fore fascinatingly. Source of melancholy need not cloud spirit of hope as is evident here. Perhaps, it explains why this book is so appealing. Nowhere does rendition look jarring or monotonous.

Rumpa Das, Associate Professor and head of the department of English in Maheshtala College in Kolkata writes (on Ink Sweat and Tears), "Reading Roy Chowdhury's poems that smell of his thought-ridden soul – his anguished response to the holocaust of the Partition (in Bhatiyali), his painful awareness of a poet's predicament in today's society and refusal to conform to pre-conditioned roles (in Bibhas) or his interpretation of relationships as an intimate experience such as those of water-droplets caressing the body while bathing (as in Ashram) – all these arouse us, his readers, as it possibly did Kiriti [Sengupta], to the intense thrill of a life beyond … of a life where every moment encompasses a myriad lives, some colored as dark as pain, and some as mysterious as evening rain."

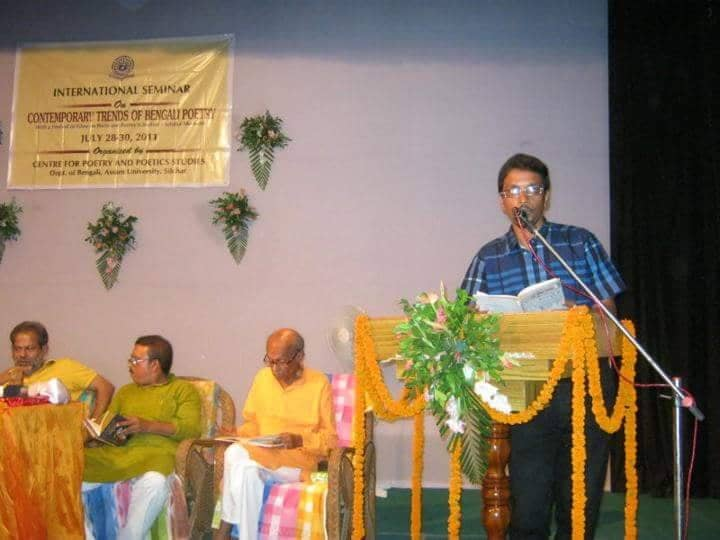
Roy Chowdhury at a seminar in 2013, second from left right, beside poet Subodh Sarkar .

The Ethos Literary Journal says (ELJ, Issue I, 9 June 2018), "Roy Chowdhury's unique and powerful voice lingers long after it stops. It's soft, warm and soulful. He writes, like he always does, either from epiphany or from peak-experience, so his every poem becomes real and living. Bibhas Roy Chowdhury creates magic reality out of the stark realities. He is the master of the craft."

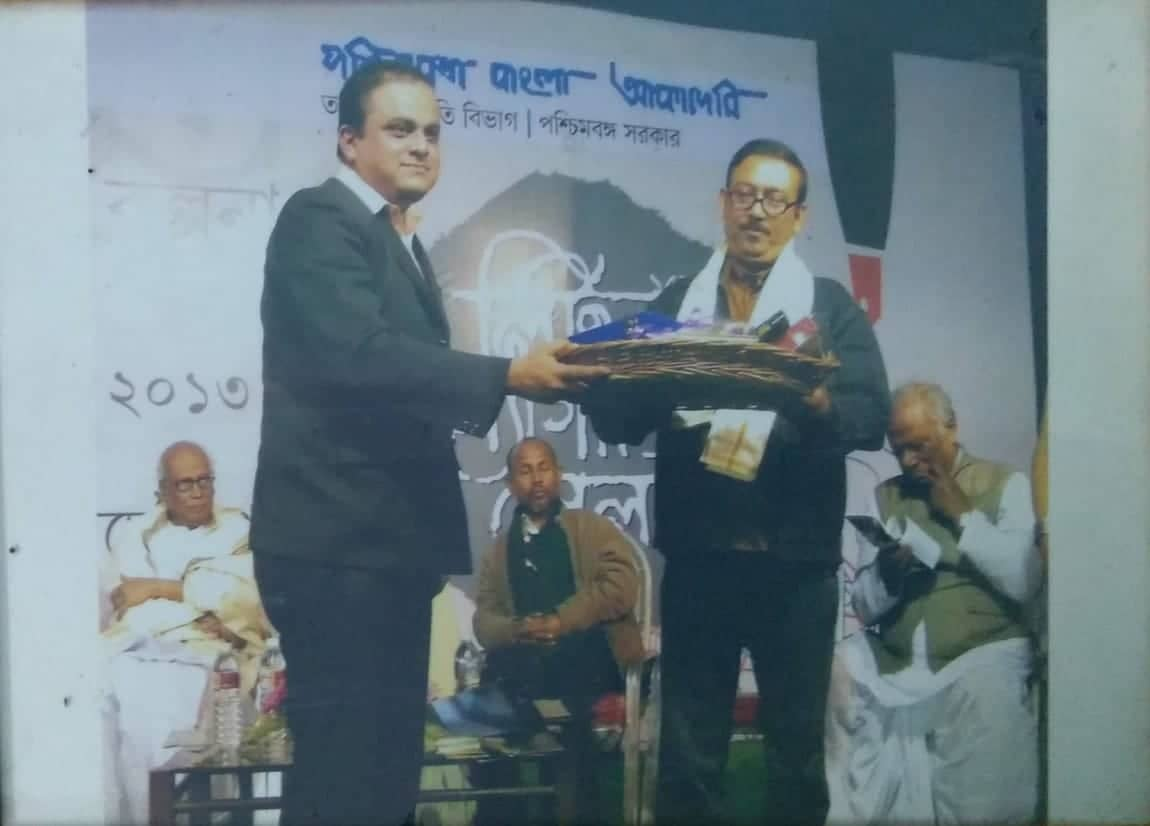
Roy Chowdhury receiving Paschim Banga Bangla Academy Award in 2013

== Other Activities ==
Roychowdhury has taken part in Save the Green movement around and beyond the frontier city Bongaon.To protest the felling of century-old trees alongside of Jessore Road, he has staged street dramas, and composed the full-length book of verse (illustrated by the artist Biplab Mondal), Jessore Roder Gaachh (The Trees Either Side of Jessore Road). The two children novels, Laag Velki, and Nadir Naam Taapur are part of his environmental awareness campaign.

== Notable works ==
=== Poetry ===
- Nasta Prajanmer Vasan (The Song of Degraded Generation), January 1996, Prativash
- Udbastu Shibirer Paakhi (The Bird of Rufugee-camp), January 1998, Prativash
- Shimul Bhasha Palash Bhasha (The Language of Shimul and Palash Trees), January 1999, Ananda Publishers
- Jibananander Meye (The Daughter of Jibanananda), December 2002, Ananda Publishers
- Chandalikagaachh (The Wild Tree), January 2006, Ananda Publishers
- Yakhan Brij Perocchhe Bongaon lokal (While the Bongaon Local Plying Across the Bridge), January 2008, Ananda Publishers
- Samasta Dukhike Aaj (To all the Agonizing People Today), December 2012, Signet Press
- Parajanmer Janye Swikaroktti (The Confession to Next-Birth/Aterlife), January 2011, Ananda Publishers
- Shrestha Kabita (The Collected/Best Poems of Bibhas Roychowdhury), January 2013, Prativash
- Poem Continuous:Reincarnated Expression (Translated by Kiriti Sengupta), June 2014, Inner Child Press
- Ananta Ashram (The Infinite Hermitage), January 2015, Signet Press
- Beejdhan Sangraha (The Collection of Paddy-seeds), February 2015, Sangbed
- Amar samanya Dau Dau (A little Blaze within Me), January 2016, Aihik
- Jashor Roder Gaachh (The Trees Alongside Jessore Road), January 2018, Chhonya Prakashani
- Prem (Love), January 2018, Boitarani
- Ei To Amar Kaaj (This is What I can Do), February 2019, Kabita Ashram
- Lajuk Vaater Dana (A Shy Grain of Rice), May 2019, Doyel Prakashani

=== Novels ===
- kalapatar Banshi (Harmonica of Banana leaf), January 2002, Muhurta Publishers
- Ashrudana (The Wings of Tears), January 2007, Ananda Publishers
- Baishe Shraban (22nd Shraban, the fourth month in Bengali year), January 2007, Ananda Publishers
- Priya Ichhamati (Beloved Ichhamati, the River), January 2009, Ananda Publishers
- Valobsar Mati(Soil of Love), Ananda Publishers
- Laag Velki (Cast the Spell), May 2019, [Doyel Prakashani]
- Nadir Naam Tapur (The River Named Tapur), in 2021,[Kabita Ashram Prakashani]

== Awards and honours ==
- Bangla Academy Award (Paschimbanga Bangla Akademi)
- Krittibas Award by Sunil Gangapadhyay-edited 'Krittibas Patrika'.
- Nirmal Acharya Gold Medal
- Boi Tarani Sammanana
- Achena Yatri Ebong dwaipayan Sahity Sammanana (অচেনা যাত্রী ও দ্বৈপায়ন সাহিত্য সম্মাননা- ১৪২২)
- Binay Mazumdar Puraskar, in 2020 by Paschimbanga Kabita Academy
