= Ali Reza Raju =

Bangladeshi politician

Member of Parliament for Jessore-3
- In office June 1996 – 2001
- Preceded by: Tariqul Islam
- Succeeded by: Tariqul Islam

Personal details
- Born: 1945 Jessore, Bengal Presidency, British India
- Died: 16 July 2016 (aged 71) Dhaka, Bangladesh
- Party: Bangladesh Awami League

Ali Reza Raju (1945 – 16 July 2016) was a Bangladeshi politician and a member of parliament from Jessore-3.

== Early life ==
Raju was born in 1945 in Jessore Sadar Upazila, Jessore District, East Bengal, British Raj.

== Career ==
Raju was elected to parliament from Jessore-3 as a Bangladesh Awami League candidate in 1996 and served till 2001.

== Death ==
Raju died on 16 July 2016 in United Hospital, Dhaka.
