= Anindya Islam Amit =

Bangladeshi politician

- অনিন্দ্য ইসলাম অমিত
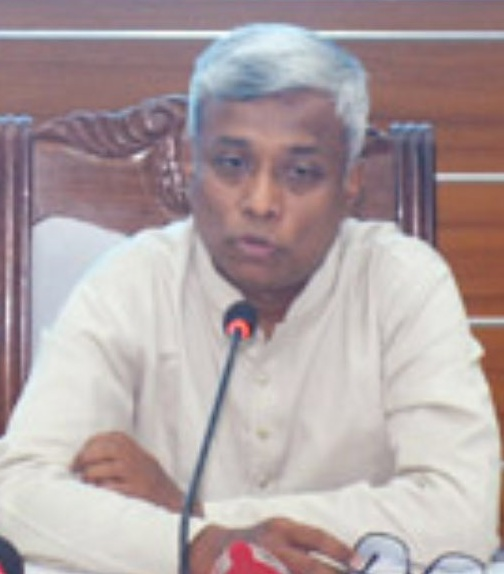
- Amit in 2026

Minister of State for Power, Energy and Mineral Resources
- Incumbent
- Assumed office 17 February 2026
- Prime Minister: Tarique Rahman
- Preceded by: Nasrul Hamid

Member of Parliament
- Incumbent
- Assumed office 17 February 2026
- Preceded by: Kazi Nabil Ahmed
- Constituency: Jessore-3

Personal details
- Born: 24 August 1975 (age 51) Jessore, Bangladesh
- Party: Bangladesh Nationalist Party
- Parent: Tariqul Islam (father)
- Education: University of Dhaka (BSc, MSc); North South University (MBA)
- Occupation: Politician, businessman

Anindya Islam Amit (born 24 August 1975) is a Bangladesh Nationalist Party politician and the incumbent Jatiya Sangsad member representing the Jessore-3 constituency. He is the incumbent state minister of power, energy and mineral resources since February 2026.

== Early life and education ==
Anindya Islam Amit was born on 24 August 1975 in Jessore District. His father, Tariqul Islam, was a member of the BNP Standing Committee and served as the minister of information.

Amit completed his kindergarten at Sacred Heart School Jashore. He Also completed his primary education from Class one to Class six at Daud Public School and College. He passed SSC in 1991 and his HSC from Jhenaidah Cadet College in 1993. Later, he obtained BSc Honours in Biochemistry and Molecular Biology from the University of Dhaka in 1996 and MSc degrees in Molecular Biology. In 2002, he obtained an MBA degree from North South University. While studying at the University of Dhaka, he led the TV debate competition of Dhaka University Fazlul Haque Hall.

== Career ==
Anindya Islam Amit is involved in business. He is the managing director of Labscan Medical Services Limited, and Loksamaj Limited. He is a life member of Jessore Medicine Bank, Red Crescent Society, Jashore Institute, Bangla Academy, Jessore Press Club, Jessore Chamber of Commerce, Jessore Club, Jhenaidah Ex-Cadet Association, Ex-Dawoodian Association, Graduate Biochemist Association, Bangladesh Biochemical Society. He is also involved in several social organizations.

Anindya Islam Amit was involved in student politics while studying at the University of Dhaka. He played a role in all the party's national and local elections since 1996. He served as a member of Jessore District BNP and as the Central Co-Organizing Secretary (Khulna Division).
