= 2000 India–Bangladesh floods =

Natural disaster in India and Bangladesh

2000 West Bengal-Bangladesh floods
- Location: West Bengal, India; Khulna, Bangladesh
- Deaths: 150 +
- Property damage: Total: 13 districts; India: 4; Bangladesh: 9

2000 India–Bangladesh floods (Bengali: ২০০০ সালের ভারত-বাংলাদেশ বন্যা), also known as the flood of 2000 occurred in the districts of West Bengal, India and the India-Bangladesh border districts of Khulna Division in 2000. In the sudden flood, people left their houses and took shelter in refuge camps. The British Broadcasting Corporation reported that the flood was worst in the area in over 50 years and affected four million people.

== Cause of flood ==
Heavy rains took place during the monsoon season of 2000. This resulted in excess water accumulated in the Farakka Barrage built on the Ganges. This led the barrage authority to open the lockgate barrage in late August. As a result, the submersible water came running through the river Padma and the water entered the Jalangi River. This is why water was carried with water to reach the rivers of Nadia. After this, the Jangari dam broke down by flooding on Nadia. The flooding waters of running Ichamati River and flooding the North 24 Pargana district in West Bengal and Khulna Division in Bangladesh. Apart from this, water from Padma was flooded with many districts of Khulna division and two districts of Barisal division. The flooding was more dangerous due to sediments in the Ichamati River, Kobadak River, Bhairab River, Rupsa River, Choita River and Jamuna River in this area. This flood lasted for about one month.

== Relief camp ==
People kept coming home and moved to the nearest safe place. The relief camp was opened for the poorly managed people in Bongaon, Gaighata, Ranaghat, Krishnanagar. In India and Bangladesh, the number of such relief workers was more than thousands. Relief camps were opened at government institutions and schools to supply of food and drinking water to the flood affected people. Apart from the various volunteer organizations like Ramkrishna Mission and Math, various local clubs ran away with relief to the flood victims.
