= Mohammad Ebadot Hossain Mondal =

Bangladeshi politician (c.1939–2019)

Member of Parliament for Jessore-3
- In office 1979–1982
- Preceded by: J. K. M. A. Aziz
- Succeeded by: Khaledur Rahman Chowdhury

Personal details
- Born: 1939
- Died: 22 December 2019 (aged 80)
- Occupation: Politician

Mohammad Ebadot Hossain Mondal (c. 1939 – 22 December 2019) was a Bangladeshi politician from Jhenaidah. He was elected Member of Parliament for BNP from Jessore-3 Constituency in 1979 in the Second National Parliament Election. He was a member of the Parliamentary Standing Committee of the Ministry of Industries.

== Biography ==
Mondal was born in 1939 in the village of Natopara of Kaliganj of Jhenaidah. He was elected as a member of Jatiya Sangsad from Jessore-3 in 1979 as a Bangladesh Nationalist Party candidate. Later, he joined Jatiya Party in 1990.

Mondal died on 22 December 2019 in Jhenaidah Sadar Hospital at the age of 80.
