= Jashore Government City College =

City of Jashore

Jessore Government City College
- Motto: Knowledge is power
- Type: Government college
- Established: 1966 (60 years ago)
- Affiliations: National University of Bangladesh
- Principal: Md. Ashraf-ud-Daulah
- Students: about 7 thousand
- Location: next to Manihar Cinema Hall, Jessore, Khulna Division, Bangladesh; 23.1617°N 89.2242°E
- Campus: city
- Website: www.jgcc.gov.bd

Jashore Government City College is a post graduate educational institution located in Manihar area of Jashore District town in Khulna Division of southern Bangladesh. At the time of its establishment in 1966, it was known as Jessore City College; it has been known as Jessore Government City College since 1986. At present, the college offers various subjects in higher secondary, undergraduate, honors, and postgraduate classes. At present, there are about 6,000 students here.

== History ==
Jessore City College was established on 17 July 1966 under the leadership of Sardar Ahmed Ali. During the establishment of the college, Prof. AFM Salimullah assumed the responsibility of the principal and carried out all the functions including the appointment of teachers of various subjects and the approval of the board and the university for the continuation of the academic activities. Higher Secondary and Undergraduate Pass Courses Existing Honors Courses in Political Science were introduced in this college in 1974 under Rajshahi University. The honors course in Bangla was introduced in this college in 1975. The college was nationalized in 1986. In the academic year 1992–93, a Masters's course in Political Science and Bangla was introduced in this college. Science buildings and student hostels were constructed to solve the physical infrastructural problems of the nationalized college. In the academic year 2003–2004, Honors courses in Accounting, Economics, Social Work, English, and Botany were introduced in this college. Due to the introduction of many honors courses, a total of 28 teaching posts including 03 professors and 08 associate professors were created in the college to solve the teacher crisis of the college. Later, honors courses in management, philosophy, and history and masters courses in social work and English were introduced in the college and he created posts in various subjects to solve the teacher crisis.
