= Bangaon =

City in West Bengal, India

- City
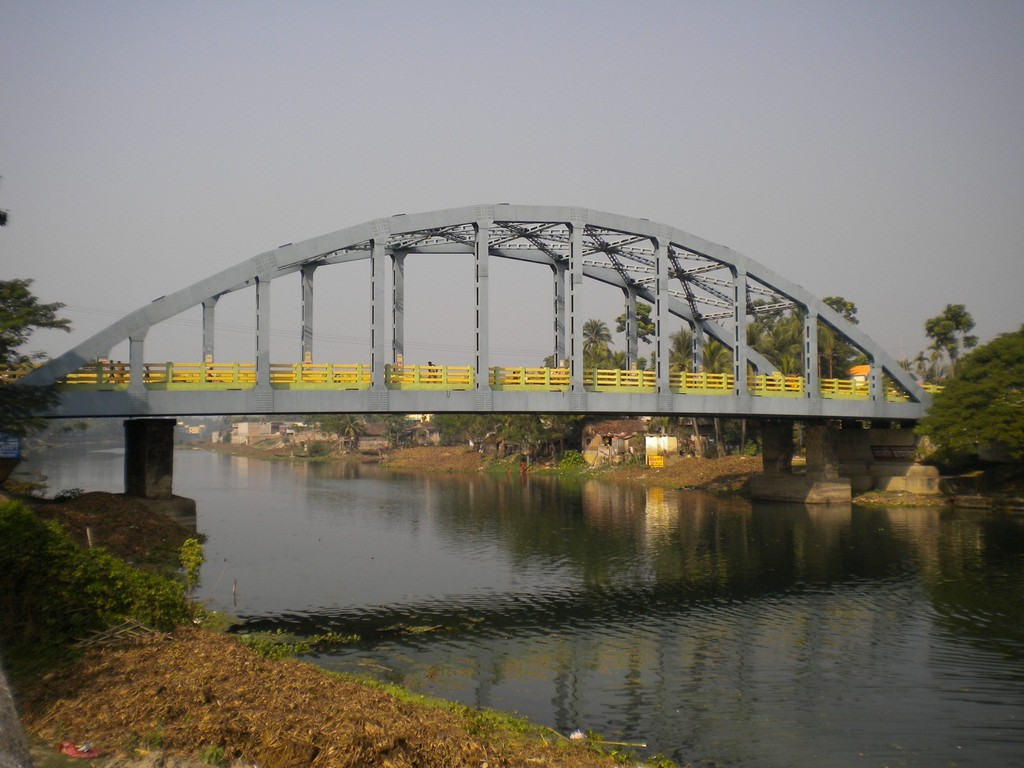
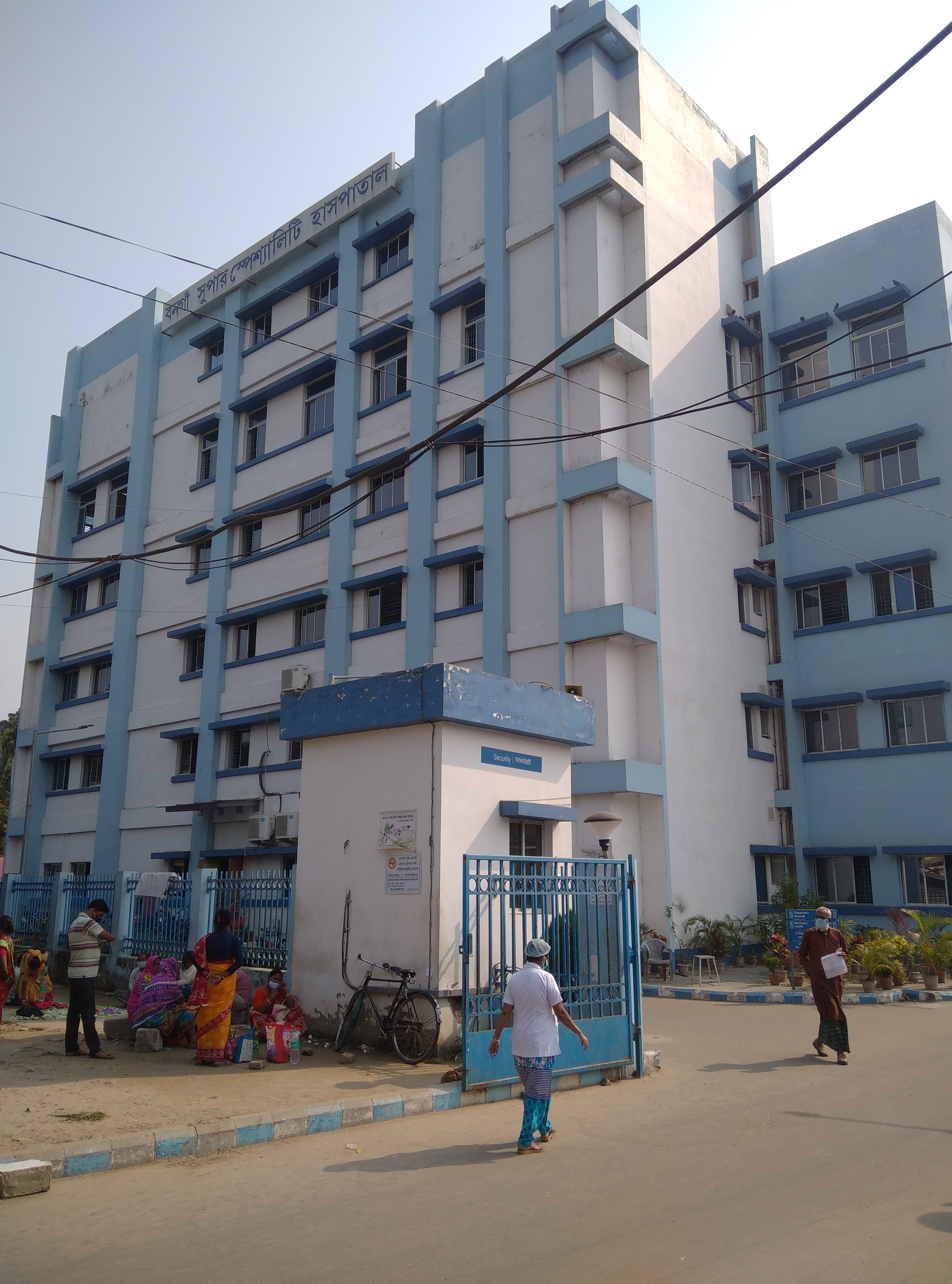
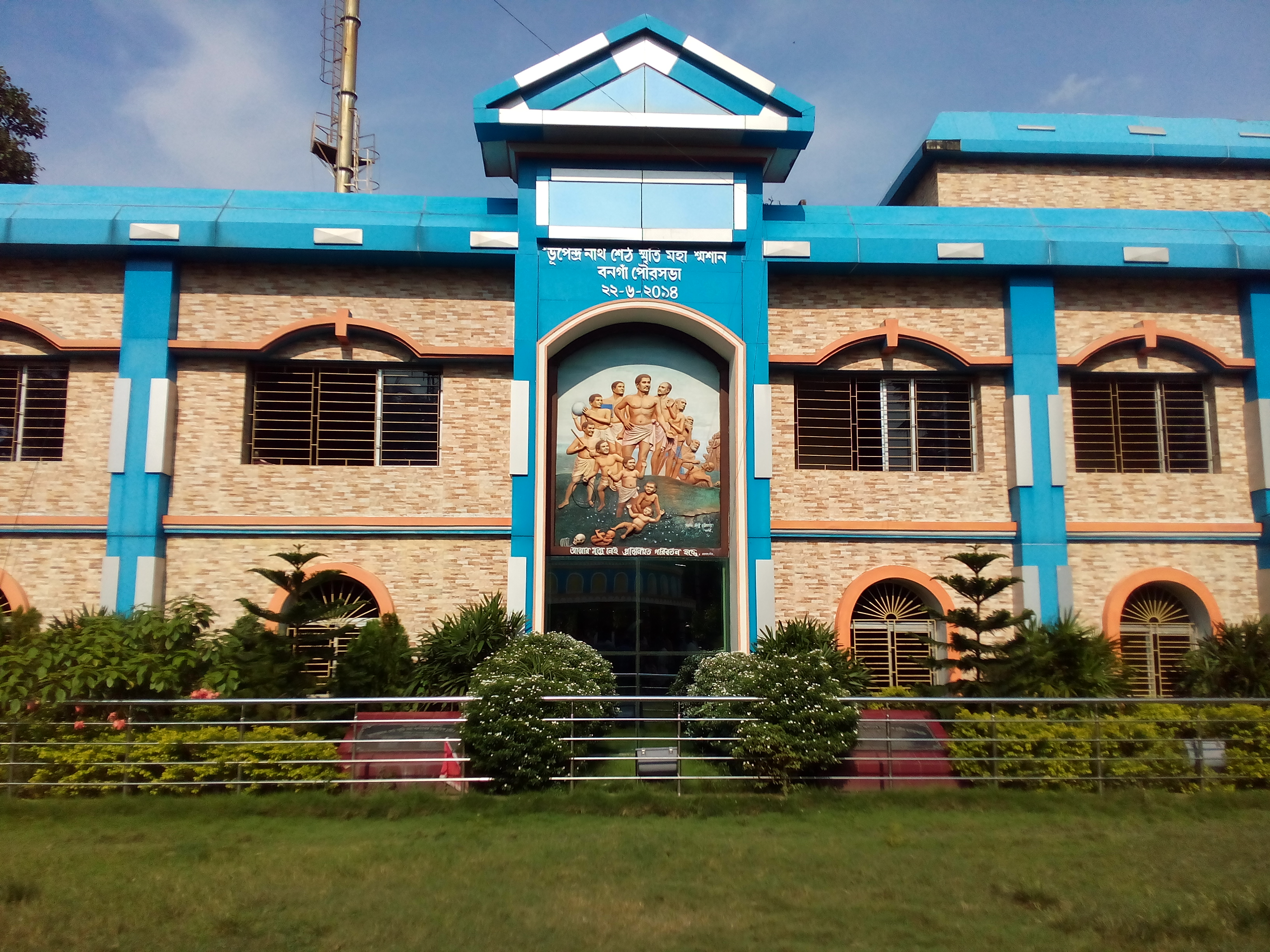
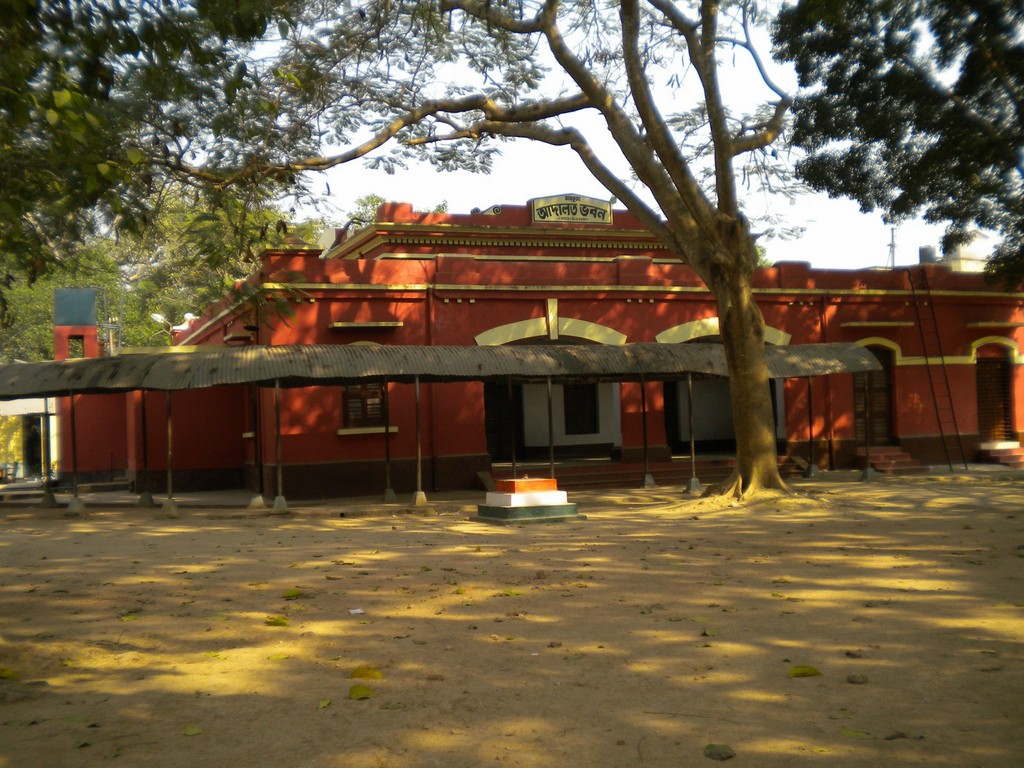
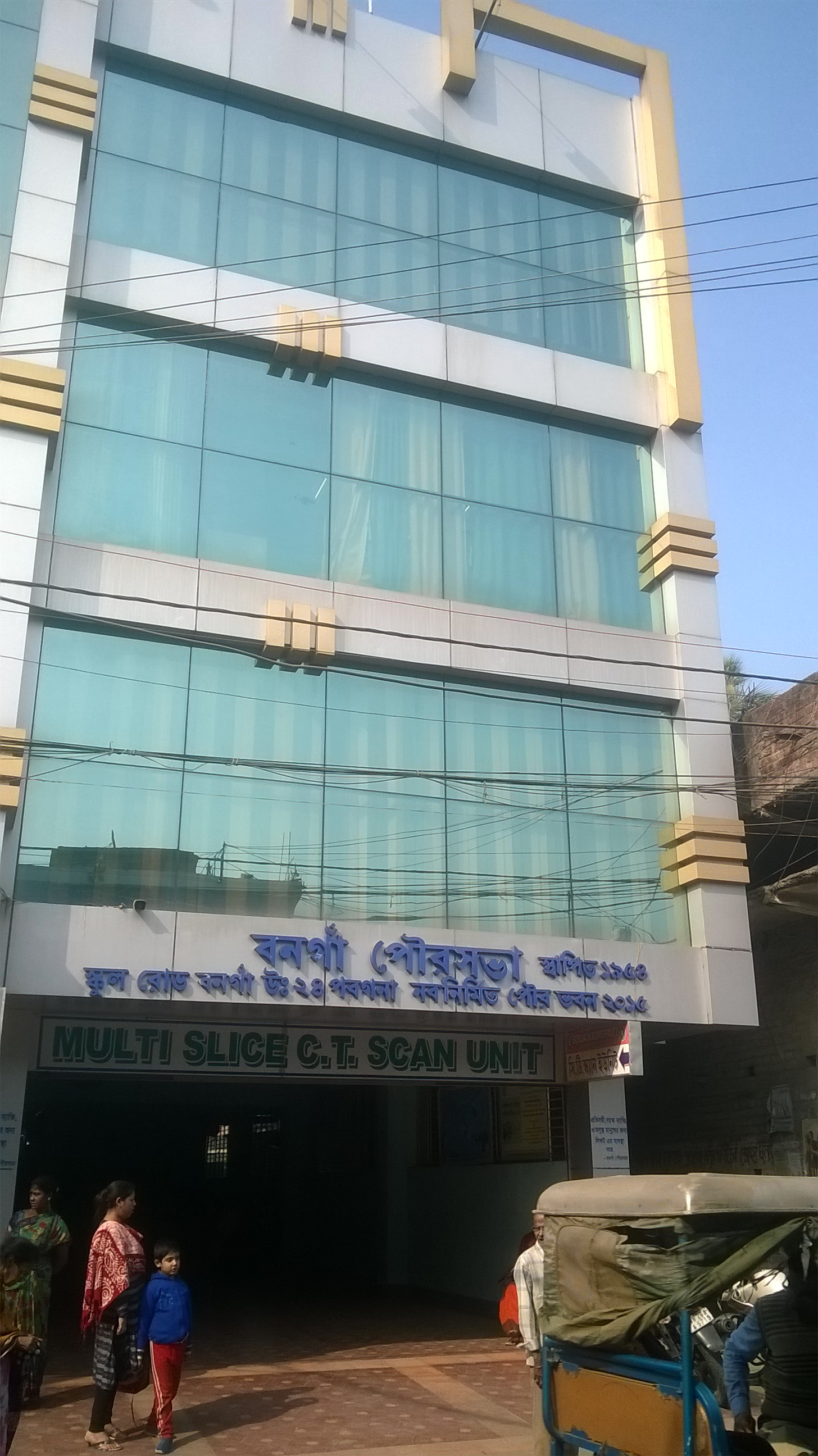
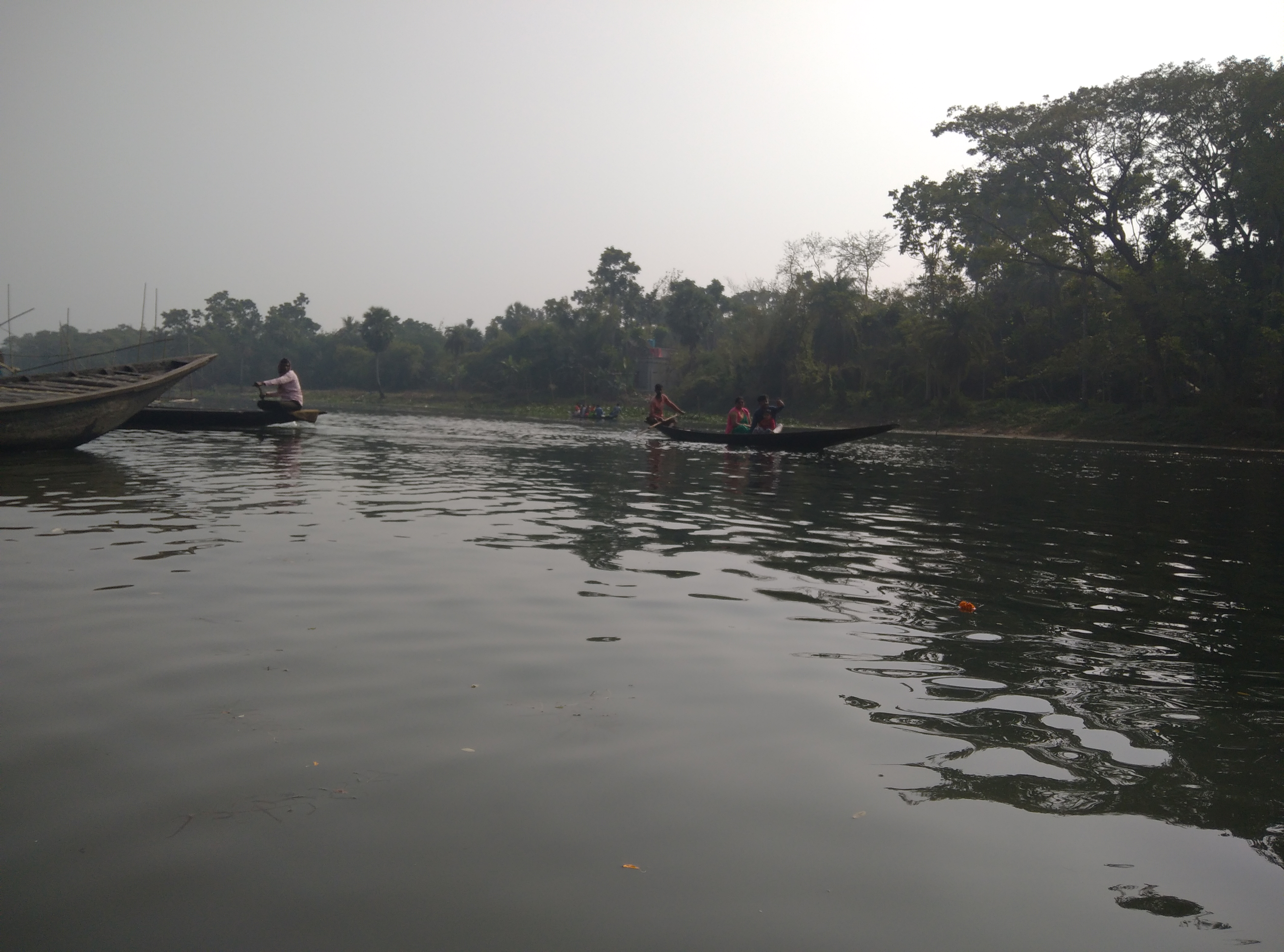
- Clockwise from top: Roy Bridge, Bangaon Mahashamshan, Municipality Office Building, Ichhamati River near Satbhai Kalitala Temple, Bangaon Subdivisional Court, Bangaon Super Specialty Hospital

- Location in West Bengal, India Bangaon (India)
- Coordinates: 23.07°N 88.82°E
- Country: India
- State: West Bengal
- District: North 24 Parganas

Government
  - Type: Municipality
  - Body: Bangaon Municipality
  - Municipality chairman: Gopal Seth
  - MLA: Ashok Kirtania
  - MP: Shantanu Thakur

Area
  - Total: 14.27 km^{2} (5.51 sq mi)
- Elevation: 7 m (23 ft)

Population (2011)
  - Total: 110,668
  - Rank: UA: 30th in West Bengal
  - Density: 7,755/km^{2} (20,090/sq mi)

Languages
  - Official: Bengali, English
- Time zone: UTC+5:30 (IST)
- ISO 3166 code: IN-WB
- Lok Sabha constituency: Bangaon
- Vidhan Sabha constituency: Bangaon Uttar
- Website: north24parganas.nic.in

Bangaon is a city and a municipality of North 24 Parganas district in the Indian state of West Bengal. It is the headquarters of the Bangaon subdivision.

== Geography ==
Cities, towns and locations in Bangaon subdivision, North 24 Parganas district
M: municipal town, CT: census town, R: rural/ urban centre, T: place of tourist interest
Owing to space constraints in the small map, the actual locations in a larger map may vary slightly

=== Location ===
Bangaon is located at 23.07°N 88.82°E. It has an average elevation of 7 metres (22 feet). Arsenic contamination is a major concern in this area.

=== Area overview ===
The area situated beside the Ichamati River shown in the map was a part of Jessore district from 1883. At the time of Partition of Bengal (1947), the Radcliffe Line placed the police station areas of Bangaon and Gaighata of Jessore district in India and the area was made a part of 24 Parganas district. The renowned novelist, Bibhutibhushan Bandopadhyay (of Pather Panchali fame) belonged to this area and many of his writings portray his experience in the area. It is a flat plain located in the lower Ganges Delta. In the densely populated area, 16.33% of the population lives in the urban area and 83.67% in rural areas.

Note: The map alongside presents some of the notable locations in the subdivision. All places marked in the map are linked in the larger full screen map.

== Transport ==
Public transport is provided by the rail, auto and buses. Bangaon railway station is part of the Kolkata Suburban Railway system. It is the last station on the Sealdah-Bangaon section of Sealdah Division, Eastern Railway, 77 km from Sealdah Station. The Sealdah–Bangaon railway was built between 1882 and 1884.

== Demographics ==
In the 2011 census, Bangaon municipality (22 no Words) had a population of 110,668, out of which 56,416 were males and 54,252 were females. The 0–6 years population was 8,452. Effective literacy rate for the 7+ population was 90.25 per cent.

== Education ==
Dinabandhu Mahavidyalay is the only degree college in Bangaon which is currently affiliated to West Bengal State University (formerly affiliated to University of Calcutta).

== Notable residents ==
- Bibhutibhushan Bandyopadhyay, Bengali novelist
- Rakhaldas Bandyopadhyay, archeologist
- Jiban Ratan Dhar (1889–1963), politician
- Jogendra Nath Mandal, politician
- Dinabandhu Mitra, Bengali novelist
- Bibhas Roy Chowdhury, poet

== See also ==
- 2000 India-Bangladesh floods
- Bangaon subdivision
- Ichamati River
