= Jiban Ratan Dhar =

Indian politician

Jiban Ratan Dhar (April 1889 – 19 January 1963) was an Indian politician. He headed the municipality of Jessore during the Partition of India, represented the Bangaon constituency in the West Bengal Legislative Assembly twice and served as Minister for Jails and Health in the state government.

== Youth ==
Dhar was the son of Prasanna Kumar Dhar, a lawyer.

Dhar went to school in Jessore and Calcutta. In 1913 he set up a students' mess at 110 College Street, Calcutta. He obtained his Bachelor of Medicine degree in Calcutta in 1916. He joined the Indian Army as a Commissioned Officer during World War I in 1916. On 18 September 1916 he was named Lieutenant in the Indian Medical Service. He remained an officer until 1926, reaching the rank of captain.

== Independence struggle and Partition ==
During the struggle for Indian independence, Dhar was jailed in 1930, 1941 and 1942. He was a member of the All India Congress Committee 1930–1950. He served as president of the Jessore Congress District Committee for 15 years. Between 1946 and 1950 he served as chairman of the Jessore municipality. He played a key role in the Bengali language movement in Jessore in 1948 and was the chairman of the National Language Action Committee of Jessore. Dhar migrated to India in 1950 and settled in Bangaon. Whilst Dhar had wished to stay in East Pakistan, he felt obliged to leave as he was threatened with being arrested.

== Minister ==
Dhar won the Bangaon constituency in the West Bengal Legislative Assembly in the 1952 West Bengal Legislative Assembly election, standing as an Indian National Congress. Dhar obtained 7,510 votes (37.34%), defeating the Communist Party of India candidate Ajit Kumar Ganguly, and independent candidate Mosharraf Hossain. He served as Minister for Jails 1952–1957, first as Deputy Minister until 1956 and then as Cabinet Minister. Dhar, himself a former prisoner, made frequent visits to the jails and advocated resocialization of prisoners.

Dhar lost his seat in the assembly in the 1957 West Bengal Legislative Assembly election. He obtained 35,809 votes (41.83%), but was defeated by Ajit Kumar Ganguly (CPI) by a margin of around 10,000 votes. As of 1958 he served as Vice President of the West Bengal Pradesh Congress Committee. He was the president of the 24 Parganas Congress Committee 1958–1960.

Dhar regained the Bangaon seat in the 1962 West Bengal Legislative Assembly election. He obtained 33,220 votes (56.88%). He was named Minister of Health in the West Bengal state government of Bidhan Chandra Roy in 1962.

== Death ==
Dhar died at the SSKM Hospital in Calcutta on 19 January 1963 after a long period of illness. In 1964 the government of West Bengal renamed the Bangaon Subdivisional Hospital as the "Bangaon Dr. Jiban Ratan Dhar Subdivisional Hospital" in his memory.
