= Raushan Ali =

Bangladeshi politician

Advocate Raushan Ali

Member of Bangladesh Parliament
- In office 5 April 1991 – 24 November 1995
- Preceded by: Gazi Abdul Hai
- Succeeded by: Tariqul Islam
- Constituency: Jessore-3
- In office 7 March 1973 – 6 November 1975
- Succeeded by: Tariqul Islam
- Constituency: Jessore-9

Governor of Jessore
- In office 24 February 1975 – 30 August 1975

Member of the Constituent Assembly of Bangladesh
- In office January 1972 – 1973

Member of the National Assembly of Pakistan
- In office 1970 – 26 March 1971
- Constituency: NE-47 (Jessore-V)

Personal details
- Born: 12 April 1921 Teghoria, Jessore District, Bengal Presidency
- Died: 19 August 1994 (aged 73) Bangladesh
- Party: Awami League; BAKSAL
- Education: University of Calcutta (Ripon College)

Raushan Ali (Bengali: রওশন আলী; 12 April 1921 – 19 August 1994) was a Bangladeshi Lawyer and Politician of the Bangladesh Awami League politician.He served as a Member of Parliament from Jessore-3. He was awarded the President's Gold Award in 1985.

== Early life and education ==
Ali was born on 12 April 1921 to a Bengali family of Muslim Bishwases in the village of Teghoria in Jessore District, Bengal Presidency. He was the son of Madar Bakhsh Bishwas. Ali completed his entrance examination from the Jessore Sammilani Institution in 1939 and passed his uccha-madhyamik in 1941. He graduated from Ripon College, Calcutta in 1951, earning a Bachelor of Laws from the University of Calcutta.

== Career ==
Ali joined the Jessore Lawyers' Society in 1952. He was the three-time elected president of Jessore Bar Association from 1982-83 and 1986. Ali became the founding director of Bangladesh Cooperative Insurance. He was the president of Bangladesh National Cooperative Industrial Association and National Cooperative Union.

=== Political career ===
In 1950, Ali joined the Awami League and was elected as the General Secretary of Jessore District Awami League in 1955. He served in this position until 1972 when he became President of Jessore District Awami League until his death. Ali also served as a member of the Central Executive Committee of Bangladesh Awami League from 1985 until his death.

In 1970, he was elected as a Member of the National Assembly of Pakistan from NE-47 (Jessore-V) (Sadar–Bagherpara) constituency on the nomination of the East Pakistan Awami League. He stayed in India during the 1971 Bangladesh Liberation War. He was a member of the Draft Constitution Drafting Committee in 1972. He was also a member of the Constituent Assembly of Bangladesh.

In the 1973 Bangladeshi general election, he was elected as a Member of Parliament from the now-defunct Jessore-9 (Sadar) constituency on the nomination of the Bangladesh Awami League. In 1975, Ali joined Bangladesh Krishak Sramik Awami League and became the Governor of Jessore. He received the President's Gold Medal in 1985 from President Hussain Muhammad Ershad. Ali was defeated as a candidate by Gazi Abdul Hai in the 1986 Bangladeshi general election. He was re-elected as a member of parliament from Jessore-3 constituency in the 1991 Bangladeshi general election.

== Death ==
Ali died on 19 August 1994 in Bangladesh.
