= Michael Madhusudan College =

Public university in Bangladesh

Coordinates: 23.1605°N 89.202°E

Government Michael Madhusudan College
- মাইকেল মধুসূদন সরকারি কলেজ
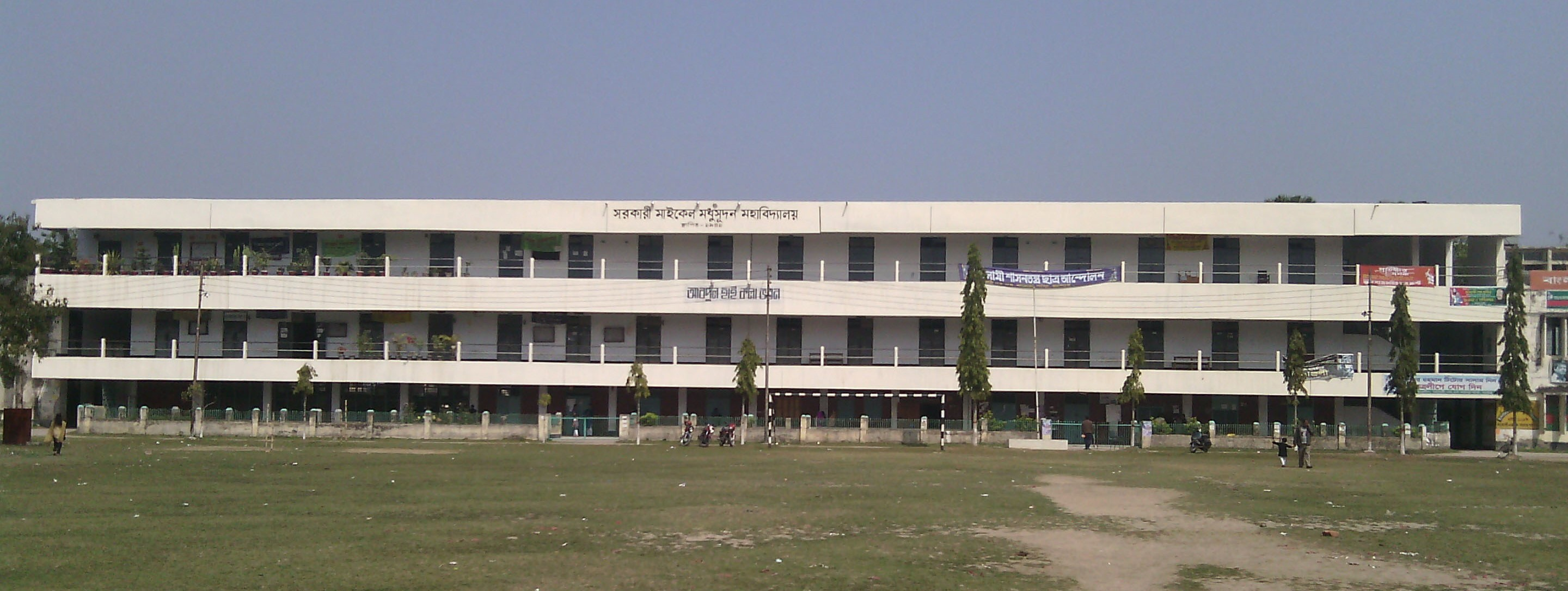
- Motto: জ্ঞানই শক্তি
- Motto in English: Knowledge is Power
- Type: Public university college
- Established: 1941 (85 years ago)
- Academic affiliations: National University of Bangladesh
- Chancellor: Mohammed Shahabuddin
- Principal: Mahbubul Haque Khan
- Faculty: 19
- Administrative staff: 162
- Students: 45,050
- Location: Jessore, Khulna, Bangladesh
- Campus: Urban

Michael Madhusudan College (Bengali: সরকারি মাইকেল মধুসূদন কলেজ), in Jessore District, is one of the largest educational institutions in Khulna Division, Bangladesh. The college is named after Bengali poet and playwright Michael Madhusudan Dutt. It has about 26,000 students and 19 faculties. It gives four years bachelor's and one year master's course opportunities under Bangladesh National University. The college also offers Higher Secondary subjects including science, commerce, and arts under the Board of Intermediate and Secondary Education, Jessore.

== History ==
Michael Madhushudan University College was established in 1941 as Jessore College. Dhirendranath Kar was the first principal of the college. In the first year, the college had 146 students of whom 109 were Hindus and 37 Muslims. The college had two separate dorms for Hindu and Muslim students. During World War II, the college building was converted to a troop barracks for the British Army. Classes were moved the estate office of the Zamindar of Hatbaria and were shifted back in 1945. In 1945, the college was renamed to Michael Madhusudan College. The college was nationalised in 1968.

== Pre-history and management committee ==
In 1942, during the Second World War, the Allies established a base at the college. At this time, the college authorities removed the college to the Kanchari house (now Fire brigade office) of Hatbaria zamindar. And there the class began. When the war ended in 1945, the college was brought back to its former location. At that time, the first name of the college was changed and the name of the best son of Jessore, the great poet Michael Madhusudan Dutt was changed to Government Michael Madhusudan College or M. M. College, in the name of Jessore.

The contribution of some people in the establishment of the college was especially memorable. They are Vijay Krishnaraya, Sri Neel Ratandhar, Vijay Roy, Khan Bahadur Lutfur, Ed. Abdur Rauf. B. Sarkar, Nagendranath Ghosh, Randa Prasad Saha and the teachers of the college at that time.

After the partition of the country in 1947, most of the Hindus left the country and the college faced a temporary crisis. But in a short time it was possible to overcome the crisis with the help of locals. At that time a new committee was formed to manage the college. They were able to run the college successfully.

Abdur Rahim Joyaddar took over as the principal of the college in 1949 and made some improvements in the college. The B.Com. (Pass) course was introduced in the college in 1956. In 1956, the college was approved by the Rajshahi University for the honors class in the Department of Geography and Economics, Bangla with B.Sc. (Pass) course. Later in 1971 the history department was started. In 1959, Principal Md. Abdul Hai and Jessore District Magistrate, College Management Committee President M. Through the efforts of Ruhul Quddus, arrangements were made to establish the college on a large scale.

He allotted new land for the college and donated some other lands - Haji Mohammad Morshed, Mohammad Abdul Khair and other prominent personalities of Jessore. Munshi Nachim Uddin, Md. Mahatab Biswas, Md. Abdul Latif, Mohammad Ali, Jabur Ali Joyaddar, Md. Dalil Uddin, Abdus Chobha, Sharif Shamsur Rahman, Md. Iman Ali are among those who are interested in giving land in Khadki area. The abandoned Jessore-Jhenaidah railway line was within the college boundary. Three bighas of khas land of this abandoned railway line was also given to the college. Two committees were formed to manage the work of the college properly. One project committee and the other construction committee.

In the 1960s, plans were made to build a college building on the abandoned land of the abandoned railway line. At that time the construction of the new building of the college cost 19 lakh rupees. The college started its activities in 1982 in this new art building.

== Educational activities ==
B.Com. (pass) and B.Sc. (pass) courses were introduced in the college in the 1950s. The college was shifted from Chuadanga bus stand to its present location (in Khadki mouza) in 1959 with the help of District Magistrate M Ruhul Quddus for the purpose of expanding the campus. Honors courses in Bengali, Economics and Geography were introduced in 1982. The college was made official on May 1, 1986. In the academic year 1991–92, Honors courses were introduced in Physics, Botany, Mathematics, Chemistry, Management and Accounting. Masters courses (first part) were opened in 1992-93 and Masters courses (last part) in 1994–95 academic year. The English Honors course was introduced in the 1995–96 academic year. In the 1996–97 academic year, honors courses in political science, sociology, philosophy, history, history of Islam, Islamic education and zoology were opened. At present there are 16 honors courses. There are 16 master's courses. Besides, higher education activities are also running in the college at present.

=== Categories ===
==== Faculty of Science ====
- Department of Physics
- Department of Chemistry
- Department of Mathematics
- Department of Botany
- Department of Zoology
- Department of Psychology
- Geography and environment

==== Faculty of Arts ====
- Bengali Department
- English Department
- Arabic Department
- Department of History
- Department of History and Culture of Islam
- Department of Philosophy

===== Faculty of Social Sciences =====
- Sociology
- Political Science
- Social work
- Economy

==== Faculty of Business Education ====
- Accounting
- Finance and Banking
- Marketing
- Management
