= List of by-elections to the West Bengal Legislative Assembly =

The following is a list of by-elections held for the West Bengal Legislative Assembly, India, since its formation in 1946.

== 15th Assembly ==
=== 2011 ===
Date	Constituency		MLA before election	Party before election	Elected MLA	Party after election
25 September 2011	125	Basirhat Uttar	Mostafa Bin Qaseem	Communist Party of India	ATM Abdullah	All India Trinamool Congress
25 September 2011	159	Bhabanipur	Subrata Bakshi	All India Trinamool Congress	Mamata Banerjee	All India Trinamool Congress

=== 2012 ===
Date	Constituency		MLA before election	Party before election	Elected MLA	Party after election
12 June 2012	230	Daspur	Ajit Bhunia	All India Trinamool Congress	Mamata Bhunia	All India Trinamool Congress
12 June 2012	252	Bankura	Kashinath Misra	All India Trinamool Congress	Minati Misra	All India Trinamool Congress

=== 2013 ===
Date	Constituency		MLA before election	Party before election	Elected MLA	Party after election
23 February 2013	51	English Bazar	Krishnendu Narayan Choudhury	Indian National Congress	Krishnendu Narayan Choudhury	All India Trinamool Congress
23 February 2013	70	Rejinagar	Humayun Kabir	Indian National Congress	Rabiul Alam Chowdhury	Indian National Congress
23 February 2013	293	Nalhati	Abhijit Mukherjee	Indian National Congress	Dipak Chatterjee	All India Forward Bloc

=== 2014 ===
Date	Constituency		MLA before election	Party before election	Elected MLA	Party after election
13 September 2014	1	Basirhat Dakshin	Narayan Mukherjee	Communist Party of India (Marxist)	Samik Bhattacharya	Bharatiya Janata Party
13 September 2014	2	Chowrangee	Sikha Mitra	All India Trinamool Congress	Nayna Bandopadhyay	All India Trinamool Congress

=== 2015 ===
Date	Constituency		MLA before election	Party before election	Elected MLA	Party after election
13 February 2015	1	Krishnaganj	Sushil Biswas	All India Trinamool Congress	Satyajit Biswas	All India Trinamool Congress

== 17th Assembly ==
=== 2021 ===
Date	Constituency		MLA before election	Party before election	Elected MLA	Party after election
30 September 2021	159	Bhabanipur	Sovandeb Chattopadhyay	All India Trinamool Congress	Mamata Banerjee	All India Trinamool Congress
30 October 2021	7	Dinhata	Nisith Pramanik	Bharatiya Janata Party	Udayan Guha	All India Trinamool Congress
30 October 2021	86	Santipur	Jagannath Sarkar	Bharatiya Janata Party	Braja Kishore Goswami	All India Trinamool Congress
30 October 2021	109	Khardaha	Kajal Sinha	All India Trinamool Congress	Sovandeb Chattopadhyay	All India Trinamool Congress
30 October 2021	127	Gosaba	Jayanta Naskar	All India Trinamool Congress	Subrata Mondal	All India Trinamool Congress

=== 2022 ===
Date	Constituency		MLA before election	Party before election	Elected MLA	Party after election
12 April 2022	161	Ballygunge	Subrata Mukherjee	All India Trinamool Congress	Babul Supriyo	All India Trinamool Congress

=== 2023 ===
Date	Constituency		MLA before election	Party before election	Elected MLA	Party after election
27 February 2023	60	Sagardighi	Subrata Saha	Trinamool Congress	Bayron Biswas	Indian National Congress
5 September 2023	15	Dhupguri	Bishnupada Roy	Bharatiya Janata Party	Nirmal Chandra Roy	Trinamool Congress

=== 2024 ===
Date	Constituency		Previous MLA		Reason	Elected MLA	
7 May 2024	62	Bhagabangola	Idris Ali	All India Trinamool Congress	Died on 16 February 2024	Reyat Hossain Sarkar	All India Trinamool Congress
1 June 2024	113	Baranagar	Tapas Roy	All India Trinamool Congress	Resigned on 4 March 2024	Sayantika Banerjee	All India Trinamool Congress
10 July 2024	35	Raiganj	Krishna Kalyani	Bharatiya Janata Party	Resigned on 27 March 2024	Krishna Kalyani	All India Trinamool Congress
10 July 2024	90	Ranaghat Dakshin	Mukut Mani Adhikari	Bharatiya Janata Party	Resigned on 19 April 2024	Mukut Mani Adhikari	All India Trinamool Congress
10 July 2024	94	Bagdah	Biswajit Das	Bharatiya Janata Party	Resigned on 19 April 2024	Madhuparna Thakur	All India Trinamool Congress
10 July 2024	167	Maniktala	Sadhan Pande	All India Trinamool Congress	Died on 20 February 2022 (Note: The seat fell vacant due to the death of sitting MLA Sadhan Pande on 20th February 2022. However, by-polls to the seat couldn't be held even after 6 months of Pande's death (according to Indian law) because BJP candidate Kalyan Chaubey filed an election petition in the Calcutta High Court alleging irregularities in polling & demanded a recount of votes. The Representation of the People Act, 1951 forbids holding any polls to the seat until any election petition concerning that seat hasn't been resolved at the court. On 29 April 2024, Choubey withdrew his election petition from the court, making way for by-poll to the seat.)	Supti Pandey	All India Trinamool Congress
13 November 2024	6	Sitai	Jagadish Chandra Barma Basunia	All India Trinamool Congress	Elected to Lok Sabha on 4 June 2024	Sangita Roy	All India Trinamool Congress
13 November 2024	14	Madarihat	Manoj Tigga	Bharatiya Janata Party	Elected to Lok Sabha on 4 June 2024	Jay Prakash Toppo	All India Trinamool Congress
13 November 2024	104	Naihati	Partha Bhowmick	All India Trinamool Congress	Elected to Lok Sabha on 4 June 2024	Sanat Dey	All India Trinamool Congress
13 November 2024	121	Haroa	Haji Nurul Islam	All India Trinamool Congress	Elected to Lok Sabha on 4 June 2024	Sheikh Rabiul Islam	All India Trinamool Congress
13 November 2024	236	Medinipur	June Malia	All India Trinamool Congress	Elected to Lok Sabha on 4 June 2024	Sujoy Hazra	All India Trinamool Congress
13 November 2024	251	Taldangra	Arup Chakraborty	All India Trinamool Congress	Elected to Lok Sabha on 4 June 2024	Falguni Singhababu	All India Trinamool Congress

=== 2025 ===
Date	Constituency		Previous MLA		Reason	Elected MLA	
19 June 2025	80	Kaliganj	Nasiruddin Ahamed	Trinamool Congress	Died on 1 February 2025	Alifa Ahmed	Trinamool Congress

== 18th Assembly ==
=== 2026 ===
Date	Constituency		MLA before election	Party before election	Reason	Elected MLA	Party after election
6 October 2026	70	Rejinagar	Humayun Kabir	Aam Janata Unnayan Party	Resigned on 13 May 2026, retaining Naoda	Sakharav Sarkar	Bharatiya Janata Party
6 October 2026	210	Nandigram	Suvendu Adhikari	Bhartiya Janata Party	Resigned on 13 May 2026, retaining Bhabanipur	Hasi Rani Rath	Bharatiya Janata Party
