= Rafiqur Rahaman =

Indian politician

Member of the West Bengal Legislative Assembly
- In office 16 November 2011 – 4 May 2026
- Preceded by: Abdus Sattar
- Succeeded by: Mohammad Kasem Siddique
- Constituency: Amdanga

Personal details
- Born: North 24 Parganas district, West Bengal, India
- Citizenship: Indian
- Party: All India Trinamool Congress
- Occupation: Politician

Rafiqur Rahaman is an Indian politician belonging to All India Trinamool Congress. He was elected as a member of West Bengal Legislative Assembly from Amdanga in 2011, 2016 and 2021.

State Legislative Assembly
Preceded by Abdus Sattar	Member of the West Bengal Legislative Assembly from Amdanga Assembly constituency 2011–	Incumbent
