= Biman Banerjee =

Indian politician

10th Speaker of the West Bengal Legislative Assembly
- In office 30 May 2011 – 15 May 2026
- Governor: M. K. Narayanan; D. Y. Patil (additional charge); Keshari Nath Tripathi; Jagdeep Dhankhar; La. Ganesan (additional charge); C. V. Ananda Bose; R. N. Ravi
- Chief Minister: Mamata Banerjee
- Deputy Speaker: Sonali Guha (2011–2016); Haider Aziz Safwi (23 June 2016 – 12 Dec 2018); Sukumar Hansda (28 Dec 2018–29 Oct 2020); Asish Banerjee (2 July 2021–7 May 2026)
- Preceded by: Hashim Abdul Halim
- Succeeded by: Rathindra Bose

Member of the West Bengal Legislative Assembly
- Incumbent
- Assumed office 13 May 2011
- Preceded by: Rahul Ghosh
- Constituency: Baruipur Paschim

Councillor of Kolkata Municipal Corporation
- In office 1985–1990

Personal details
- Born: 28 December 1948 (age 77) Kolkata, West Bengal, India
- Party: Trinamool Congress (1998–present); Indian National Congress (until 1998)

Biman Banerjee (born 28 December 1948) is an Indian politician who has served as the 10th Speaker of the West Bengal Legislative Assembly from 30 May 2011 till 5 May 2026. He is a sitting member of West Bengal Legislative Assembly from Baruipur Paschim and member of Trinamool Congress.

== Early life and education ==
Born and raised in Garden Reach, Banerjee graduated from the Goenka College and completed his master's degree in commerce and simultaneously in law from the University of Calcutta. His grandfather, Satish Chandra Banerjee, and his father, Pranotosh Banerjee, were reputed lawyers.

== Career ==
He was employed in the Bank of India but subsequently left the job and joined the legal profession. He also served as a part-time lecturer in commercial & industrial law at Hari Mohan Ghosh College and was an examiner in Calcutta University. He was elected as Councilor of Calcutta Municipal Corporation in 1985 from ward no. 136. He was also elected as a member of the West Bengal Bar Council.

=== Political career ===
In May 2011, the Trinamool MLA from Baruipur Paschim and practicing lawyer was elected as Speaker of the West Bengal Assembly unopposed, as the Opposition did not nominate a candidate for the post. After the election, he took a decision to give more importance to the sensitivities of the opposition and promised to give them more time to speak, on Chief Minister Mamata Banerjee's advice, a decision which was welcomed by the Leader of the Opposition, Suryakanta Mishra. After Biman Banerjee was elected, he was taken to the Speaker's Chair by Mishra, Prabodh Chandra Sinha and Subhas Naskar, where he engaged in the protocol of exchanging courtesies with the outgoing speaker, Hashim Abdul Halim.
