= Hashim Abdul Halim =

Indian politician

Speaker of the West Bengal Legislative Assembly
- In office 6 May 1982 – 18 May 2011
- Governor: Bhairab Dutt Pande; Anant Prasad Sharma; Uma Shankar Dikshit; Saiyid Nurul Hasan; K. V. Raghunatha Reddy; Viren J. Shah; Gopalkrishna Gandhi; M. K. Narayanan
- Succeeded by: Gyan Singh Sohanpal (pro tem); Biman Banerjee

Member of the West Bengal Legislative Assembly
- In office 11 May 2006 – 13 May 2011
- Preceded by: Md. Abu Sufyan
- Succeeded by: Swarna Kamal Saha
- Constituency: Entally
- In office 1977–2006
- Preceded by: New Seat
- Succeeded by: Abdus Sattar
- Constituency: Amdanga

Cabinet Minister, Government of West Bengal
- In office 1977–1982
- Governor: Anthony Lancelot Dias; Tribhuvana Narayana Singh; Bhairab Dutt Pande
- Chief Minister: Jyoti Basu
- Ministry: Minister, Judicial Department, Government of West Bengal

Personal details
- Born: 5 June 1935
- Died: 2 November 2015 (aged 80) Kolkata, India
- Party: Communist Party of India (Marxist)
- Children: 4(Including Fuad Halim)

Hashim Abdul Halim (5 June 1935 – 2 November 2015) was an Indian communist and politician who was speaker of the West Bengal Legislative Assembly from 1982 to 2011.

== Life and career ==
Abdul Halim started his career as a practising lawyer. He was also an alderman at the Kolkata Municipal Corporation. His uncle, M. Ishaque, was a member of the Congress Party and a freedom fighter. He had also served as the chairman of the Commonwealth Parliamentary Association and president of the World Federation of United Nations Association.

A member of the Communist Party of India (Marxist), he was elected to the Legislative Assembly of West Bengal for the first time in 1977. Thereafter, he served in the assembly for six terms, from 1977 to 2011. He was the minister for Judicial Affairs in the Government of West Bengal from 1977 to 1982 and subsequently served as speaker of the Legislative Assembly from 1982 to 2011. He was the MLA for Amdanga constituency from 1977 to 2006, when he shifted his constituency to the Entally constituency. He was the MLA from Entally until 2011. He served in numerous departments and committees of West Bengal. Abdul Halim also represented West Bengal at numerous seminars in India and abroad. Abdul Halim was the longest-serving speaker of any legislative assembly in India, serving consecutively for 29 years, from 6 May 1982 to May 2011. After the 2011 elections in West Bengal, Abdul Halim was replaced by Biman Banerjee as the Speaker of the West Bengal Vidhan Sabha.

Abdul Halim held a master's degree in commerce, a bachelor's degree in law and was awarded an honorary doctorate by Soka University, Tokyo. He was married and had four children. His son, Fuad Halim, was the CPI(M) candidate for the Ballygunge constituency in the 2011 West Bengal elections, but lost to Trinamool Congress' Subrata Mukherjee by 41,000 votes.

Abdul Halim died on 2 November 2015 in Kolkata at the age of 80.
