= List of speakers of the West Bengal Legislative Assembly =

Presiding officer of WB legislative assembly

Speaker of the West Bengal Legislative Assembly
- Crest of West Bengal Legislative Assembly

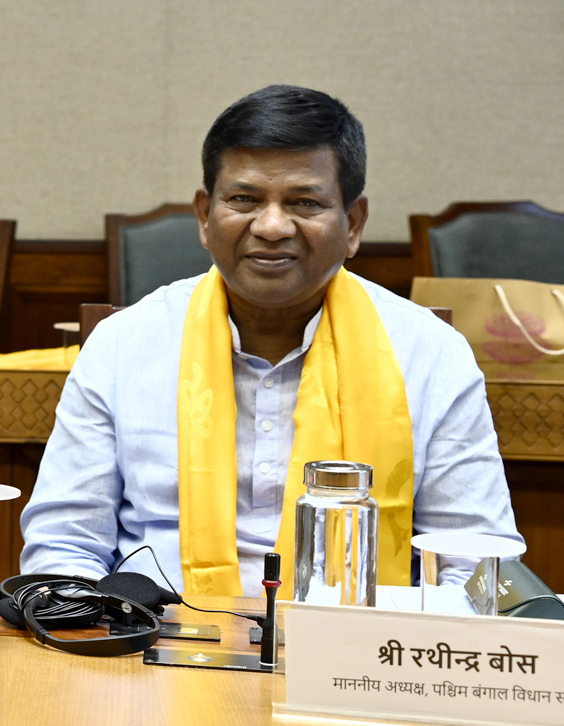
- Incumbent; Rathindra Bose since 15 May 2026
- West Bengal Legislative Assembly
- Style: The honourable
- Status: Head of the Legislative Assembly
- Member of: West Bengal Legislative Assembly
- Seat: Bidhan Bhavan, B. B. D. Bagh, Kolkata
- Appointer: Members of the West Bengal Legislative Assembly
- Term length: maximum 5 years unless dissolved
- Constituting instrument: Constitution of India
- Precursor: Speaker of Bengal Legislative Assembly (British India)
- Formation: 1950
- First holder: Ishwar Das Jalan (21 November 1947—19 June 1952)
- Deputy: Vacant
- Salary: as per the article 186, second schedule and laws made under their preview
- Website: assembly.wb.gov.in/wblaSecretariat.aspx

The Speaker of the West Bengal Legislative Assembly is the title given to the presiding officer (chair) of the West Bengal Legislative Assembly. The Speaker's official role is to moderate debate, make rulings on procedure, announce the results of votes, etc. The Speaker decides who may speak and has the powers to discipline members who break the procedures of the Assembly. The Speaker often also represents the body in person, as the voice of the body in ceremonial and some other situations. Many bodies also have a speaker pro tempore or deputy speaker, designated to fill in when the speaker is not available.

The current Speaker of the in 18th West Bengal Legislative Assembly is Rathindra Bose.

== List of speakers ==
=== Bengal Legislative Assembly ===
Speaker of the Bengal Legislative Assembly

| No | Portrait | Speakers | Term start | Term end | Party affiliation |
Legislative Assembly under the Government of India Act 1935.
| 1 | | Sir Azizul Haque | 7 April 1937 | 27 April 1942 | |
| 2 | | Syed Nausher Ali | 1 March 1943 | 14 May 1946 | |
| 3 | | Nurul Amin | 14 May 1946 | 15 August 1947 | |

President of the Bengal Legislative Assembly

| No | Presidents | Term start | Term end | Party affiliation |
|---|---|---|---|---|
| 1 | Satyendra Chandra Mitra | 9 April 1937 | 27 October 1942 | |
| 2 | Bijoy Prasad Singh Roy | 1943 | 1947 | |

=== West Bengal Legislative Assembly ===
Speaker of the West Bengal Legislative Assembly

| No | Speakers | Term start | Term end | Party affiliation |
|---|---|---|---|---|
| Legislative Assembly under the Government of India Act 1935. | | | | |
| 1 | Ishwar Das Jalan | 21 November 1947 | 19 June 1952 | Indian National Congress |
| Legislative Assembly under the Constitution of India | | | | |
| 2 | Saila Kumar Mukherjee | 20 June 1952 | 20 March 1957 | Indian National Congress |
| 3 | Sankar Das Banerji | 4 June 1957 | 15 May 1959 | Indian National Congress |
| 4 | Bankim Chandra Kar | 22 February 1960 | 11 March 1962 | Indian National Congress |
| 5 | Keshab Chandra Basu | 12 March 1962 | 7 March 1967 | Indian National Congress |
| 6 | Bijoy Kumar Banerjee | 8 March 1967 | 2 May 1971 | Indian National Congress |
| 7 | Apurba Lal Majumdar | 3 May 1971 | 23 June 1977 | Indian National Congress |
| 8 | Syed Abdul Mansur Habibullah | 24 June 1977 | 13 June 1982 | Communist Party of India (Marxist) |
| 9 | Hashim Abdul Halim | 14 June 1982 | 29 May 2011 | Communist Party of India (Marxist) |
| 10 | Biman Banerjee | 30 May 2011 | 15 May 2026 | Trinamool Congress |
| 11 | Rathindra Bose | 15 May 2026 | Incumbent | Bharatiya Janata Party |

== List of Deputy Speakers ==
1. Ashraf Ali Khan Chowdhury (1937–1941)

2. Syed Jalaluddin Hashmey (18 February 1942 – 17 November 1945)

3. Tafazzal Ali (14 May 1946 – 15 August 1947)

4. Asutosh Mallick (21 November 1947 – 19 June 1952)

Deputy Presidents :

1. Hamidul Huq Chowdhury (1937–1939)

2. Khan Bahadur Abdul Hamid Chowdhury (1940–1947)

Deputy Speakers :

| No. | Deputy Speaker | Term start | Term end |
|---|---|---|---|
| 1. | Ashutosh Mallick | 20 June 1952 | 4 May 1966 |
| 2. | Narendra Nath Sen | 29 August 1966 | 28 February 1967 |
| 3. | Haridas Mitra | 8 March 1967 | 20 February 1968 |
| 4 | Apurba Lal Majumdar | 6 March 1969 | 30 July 1970 |
| 5 | Pijush Kanti Mukherjee | 3 May 1971 | 25 June 1971 |
| (3) | Haridas Mitra | 24 March 1972 | 30 April 1977 |
| 6 | Kalimuddin Shams | 27 June 1977 | 30 March 1987 |
| 7 | Anil Mukherjee | 6 May 1987 | 17 February 2002 |
| 8 | Kripa Sindhu Saha | 7 March 2002 | 12 May 2006 |
| 9 | Shri Bhakti Pada Ghosh | 16 June 2006 | 13 May 2011 |
| 10 | Sonali Guha | 17 June 2011 | 23 June 2016 |
| 11 | Haider Aziz Safwi | 23 June 2016 | 12 December 2018 |
| 12 | Sukumar Hansda | 12 December 2018 | 29 October 2020 |
| 13 | Asish Banerjee | 2 July 2021 | 7 May 2026 |

== Pro tem Speaker ==
After a general election and the formation of a new government, a list of senior Members in Vidhan Sabha prepared by the Legislative Section is submitted to the Minister of Parliamentary Affairs, who selects a pro tem speaker who holds the office of Speaker until a full time speaker is elected. The appointment has to be approved by the Governor.

The first meeting after the election when the speaker and the deputy speaker are selected by members of the Vidhan Sabha is held under the pro tem Speaker. In the absence of the speaker, the deputy speaker acts as speaker. In the absence of both, a committee of six members selected by the speaker will act as speaker according to their seniority.

The Speaker of the Assembly must:

- Be a citizen of India;
- Not be less than 25 years of age; and
- Not hold any office of profit under the Government of West Bengal, India.

=== List of Pro tem Speakers ===
| No | Pro tem Speakers | Speakers |
|---|---|---|
| 1 | Ishwar Das Jalan | |
| 2 | Saila Kumar Mukherjee | |
| 3 | Sankar Das Banerji | |
| 4 | Bankim Chandra Kar | |
| 5 | Keshab Chandra Basu | |
| 6 | Bijoy Kumar Banerjee | |
| 7 | Apurba Lal Majumdar | |
| 8 | S. A. M. Habibullah | |
| 9 | Hashim Abdul Halim | |
| 10 | Gyan Singh Sohanpal/Subrata Mukherjee | Biman Banerjee |
| 11 | Tapas Roy | Rathindra Bose |

== Election of the Speaker and Deputy Speaker ==
The articles 178,179,180,181 deals with all the aspects of election,regulation and removal of speaker and deputy speaker. In the Vidhan Sabha, a simple majority vote in the Assembly in which all present members participate determine both the Speaker and the Deputy Speaker — the presiding officers — who are also its members.

The party in power proposes the name of their candidate after its candidate after titular hearings with Leaders of other Parties who are a part of the Assembly. This ensures that the Speaker is accepted by all political Parties belonging to the Assembly. The name of the candidate determined by the party in power is usually proposed by the Chief Minister or the Minister for Parliamentary Affairs. The pro-tem Speaker chairs the session in which the election for the post of the Speaker takes place.

The Deputy Speaker chairs sessions where the election takes place towards the end of a Vidhan Sabha. Once the election is over, the person who is presiding declares the chosen candidate to be Speaker of the Assembly, without latter motions being voted upon. Once the final tally of votes is declared, the Chief Minister and Leader of the Opposition escort the Speaker elect to the Chair. His speech, in which he thanks the Assembly, marks the start of the tenure of the new Speaker.

=== Qualifications required ===
The Speaker of the West Bengal Vidhan Sabha has to be an MLA.

To become the Speaker of the West Bengal Vidhan Sabha, a person must be a citizen of India, not less than 25 years of age. He should be mentally sound and should not be bankrupt. He should also state an affidavit that there are no criminal procedures against him.

The Speaker is elected by other members of the Vidhan Sabha and is responsible for the conduct of business of the body. A Deputy Speaker to also elected to preside during the Speaker's absence. The Speaker acts as a neutral judge and manages all debates and discussions in the Assembly.

The Speaker can also initiate a motion of no confidence against the government in the state. If it is passed by a majority vote, then the Chief Minister and his Council of Ministers must collectively resign.

The Speaker is supposed to resign from his original party because as a speaker, he has to remain impartial.

== Role in the Legislative Assembly ==
The Speaker presides over the sessions of the Vidhan Sabha and conducts the business in the Assembly. He decides whether a bill is a money bill or a non-money bill. He maintains discipline and decorum in the Assembly and can punish a member for their unruly behaviour by suspending them. He permits the moving of various kinds of motions and resolutions like the motion of no confidence, motion of adjournment, motion of censure and calling attention notice as per the rules. The Speaker decides on the agenda to be taken up for discussion during the meeting. The date of election of the Speaker is fixed by the Governor.

Although the members of Vidhan Sabha represent their constituencies, the Speaker represents the whole Assembly.

While the office of Speaker is vacant, the duties of the office are performed by the Deputy Speaker or, if the office of Deputy Speaker is also vacant, by such member of the Assembly as the Governor may appoint for the purpose.

During the absence of the Speaker from any sitting of the Assembly the Deputy Speaker or, if he is also absent, such person as may be determined by the Assembly, or, if no such person is present, such other person as may be determined by the Assembly, shall act as Speaker.

== Term of office ==
The term of office of the Speaker ranges from the day he is elected to the dissolution of the Vidhan Sabha. When the Assembly is dissolved, the Speaker terminates his tenure as a member of the Assembly, but does not quit his position as Speaker. He stands eligible for re-election.

A member holding office as Speaker or Deputy Speaker of an Assembly shall vacate his office if his tenure as member of the Assembly is terminated; or may at any time by writing under his hand addressed, if such members is the Speaker, to the Deputy Speaker, and if such member is the Deputy Speaker, to the Speaker, resign his office; and may be removed from his office by a resolution of the Assembly provided that no resolution shall be moved unless at least fourteen days' notice has been given.

Further, whenever the Assembly is dissolved, the speaker shall not vacate his office until immediately prior to the Vidhan Sabha's first meeting after the dissolution.

At any sitting of the Legislative Assembly, while any resolution for the removal of the Speaker from his office is under consideration, the Speaker, or while any resolution for the removal of the Deputy Speaker from his office is under consideration, the Deputy Speaker, shall not, though he is present, preside, and during the absence of the Speaker from any sitting of the Assembly the Deputy Speaker in relation to every such sitting as they apply in relation to a sitting from which the Speaker or, as the case may be, the Deputy Speaker, is absent.

The Speaker shall have the right to speak and take part in discussions in the Legislative Assembly while any resolution for his removal from office is under consideration in the Assembly and shall be entitled to vote only in the first instance on such resolution or on any other matter during such proceedings but not in the case of an equality of votes.

== The Speaker's chair ==
In the Vidhan Sabha Chamber, the Speaker, from his seat, gets the complete view of the Assembly. He is helped by the senior officials belonging to the West Bengal Secretariat. The Deputy Speaker chairs the sitting when the Speaker is absent. If both the Speakers cannot attend a session, a member of the Panel of Chairmen chairs the Assembly.

He is the customary head of the Vidhan Sabha and an arbiter. His decisions are final and cannot be challenged.

== Speaker and the Committees ==
The Speaker constitutes all Committees of the Assembly. He nominates the Chairpersons of all the Parliamentary Committees. Political problems hampering the functioning of Committees are consulted with him for directions. The Advisory Committee on Business, the Committee of General Purposes and the Committee of Rules fall under him.

== Speaker and members ==
Apart from being the Chairperson of the Assembly, he is also a member of the Assembly. He is entrusted with wide-ranging punitive powers to help him maintain proper conduct in the Assembly. He is expected to give sufficient time to all members of the Assembly and help them get their views across. The Speaker also keeps communicating with members, leaders of parties, etc., in the Vidhan Sabha. He interacts with leaders of other parties at semi-formal meetings a day before the start of a session, to know their mood on a wide range of issues.

== Salary ==
The salaries and allowances of the Speaker and the Deputy Speaker of the Legislative Assembly are fixed by the Legislature of the State under article 186 of the constitution. Such salaries and allowances are specified in the Second Schedule.

== See also ==
- List of deputy speakers of the West Bengal Legislative Assembly
