= Ashis Kumar Biswas =

Indian politician

Member of the West Bengal Legislative Assembly
- In office 23 May 2019 – 4 May 2026
- Preceded by: Satyajit Biswas
- Succeeded by: Sukanta Biswas
- Constituency: Krishnaganj

Personal details
- Party: Bharatiya Janata Party

Ashis Kumar Biswas is an Indian politician. He was elected to the West Bengal Legislative Assembly from Krishnaganj, West Bengal in the by-election in 2019 as a member of the Bharatiya Janata Party. The seat was vacant after the murder of the sitting All India Trinamool Congress MLA Satyajit Biswas.

State Legislative Assembly
Preceded by Satyajit Biswas (AITC)	Member of the West Bengal Legislative Assembly from Krishnaganj Assembly constituency 2016–	Incumbent
