= Sushil Biswas =

Indian teacher politician

Member of West Bengal Legislative Assembly
- In office 1991 – 11 May 2006
- Preceded by: Nayan Chandra Sarkar
- Succeeded by: Binoy Krishna Biswas
- Constituency: Krishnahanj
- In office 14 May 2011 – 21 October 2014
- Preceded by: Binoy Krishna Biswas
- Succeeded by: Satyajit Biswas
- Constituency: Krishnahanj

Personal details
- Born: 1955
- Died: 21 October 2014 (aged 58–59)
- Party: All India Trinamool Congress (2006-2014); Communist Party of India (1991-2006)

Sushil Biswas was an Indian politician from West Bengal belonging to All India Trinamool Congress. He was a legislator of the West Bengal Legislative Assembly.

== Biography ==
Biswas was a primary school teacher. He was elected as a legislator of the West Bengal Legislative Assembly as a CPM candidate from Krishnahanj in 1992. He was also elected from this constituency in 1996 and 2001. Later, he joined Trinamool Congress. He was elected from this constituency as a Trinamool Congress candidate in 2011.

Biswas died on 21 October 2014.
