= Souvik Patra =

Indian politician

Member of the West Bengal Legislative Assembly
- Incumbent
- Assumed office May 2026
- Preceded by: Falguni Singhababu
- Constituency: Taldangra

Personal details
- Born: Bankura, West Bengal, India
- Party: Bharatiya Janata Party
- Education: Higher Secondary

Souvik Patra is an Indian politician from West Bengal belonging to the Bharatiya Janata Party. He was elected as a member of the West Bengal Legislative Assembly from the Taldangra constituency in 2026.

== Political career ==
Patra contested the 2026 West Bengal Legislative Assembly election as a candidate of the Bharatiya Janata Party. On 4 May 2026, he was declared the winner of the Taldangra seat, defeating his nearest rival, Falguni Singhababu of the All India Trinamool Congress, by a margin of 50,073 votes.

== Personal life ==
Patra is the son of Ranjit Patra and is a resident of Bikrampur in the Bankura district. He completed his Higher Secondary education from Bikrampur Radha Damodar High School in 2011.
