= Amdanga Assembly constituency =

West Bengal Legislative Assembly constituency

Amdanga
- Constituency No. 102 for the West Bengal Legislative Assembly
- Interactive Map Outlining Amdanga Assembly Constituency

Constituency details
- Country: India
- Region: East India
- State: West Bengal
- District: North 24 Parganas
- Lok Sabha constituency: Barrackpore
- Established: 1977
- Total electors: 177,515
- Reservation: None

Member of Legislative Assembly
- 18th West Bengal Legislative Assembly
- Incumbent Mohammad Kasem Siddique
- Party: Democratic Trinamool Congress
- Elected year: 2026

Party-wise wins in Amdanga Assembly constituency
1. Communist Party of India (Marxist) (7) (63.6%)
2. All India Trinamool Congress (4) (36.4%)

Amdanga Assembly constituency is an assembly constituency in North 24 Parganas district in the Indian state of West Bengal.

== Overview ==
As per orders of the Delimitation Commission, No. 102 Amdanga Assembly constituency is composed of the following: Amdanga community development block, and Dattapukur I, Dattapukur II and Kashimpur gram panchayats of Barasat I community development block.

Amdanga Assembly constituency is part of No. 15 Barrackpore (Lok Sabha constituency).

== Members of the Legislative Assembly ==
Year	Name	Party
1977	Hashim Abdul Halim	Communist Party of India (Marxist)
1982	Hashim Abdul Halim	Communist Party of India (Marxist)
1987	Hashim Abdul Halim	Communist Party of India (Marxist)
1991	Hashim Abdul Halim	Communist Party of India (Marxist)
1996	Hashim Abdul Halim	Communist Party of India (Marxist)
2001	Hashim Abdul Halim	Communist Party of India (Marxist)
2006	Abdus Sattar	Communist Party of India (Marxist)
2011	Rafiqur Rahaman	All India Trinamool Congress
2016	Rafiqur Rahaman	All India Trinamool Congress
2021	Rafiqur Rahaman	All India Trinamool Congress
2026	Mohammad Kasem Siddique	All India Trinamool Congress

== Election results ==
=== 2026 ===
2026 West Bengal Legislative Assembly election: Amdanga
Party	Candidate	Votes	%	±%
AITC	Mohammad Kasem Siddique	81,670	38.25	−3.75
BJP	Arindam Dey	78,675	36.85	+6.88
Indian Secular Front	Biswajit Maity	46,181	21.63	−2.41
NOTA	None of the above	1,569	0.73	−0.37
Majority		2,995	1.4	−10.63
Turnout		213,502	96.39	+9.06
AITC hold		Swing		

=== 2021 ===
2021 West Bengal Legislative Assembly election: Amdanga
Party	Candidate	Votes	%	±%
AITC	Rafiqur Rahaman	88,935	42.0	
BJP	Jaydeb Manna	63,455	29.97	
Indian Secular Front	Jamal Uddin	50,905	24.04	
NOTA	None of the above	2,324	1.1	
Majority		25,480	12.03	
Turnout		211,742	87.33	
AITC hold		Swing		

=== 2016 ===
In the 2016 election, Rafiqur Rahaman of Trinamool Congress defeated his nearest rival Abdus Sattar of CPI(M).

2016 West Bengal state assembly election: Amdanga constituency
Party	Candidate	Votes	%	±%
AITC	Rafiqur Rahaman	96,193	50.00	−3.79
CPI(M)	Abdus Sattar	73,228	38.06	−2.42
BJP	Arindam Dey	15,691	8.16	+5.30
NOTA	None of the above	1,808	0.94	
PDS	Motiar Rahaman Biswas	1,655	0.86	−0.84
BSP	Safique Ali	1,647	0.86	−0.30
SUCI(C)	Goutam Biswas	1,178	0.61	
Independent	Kaosar Ali Mallik	995	0.52	
Turnout		192,395	89.05	−2.24
AITC hold		Swing		

=== 2011 ===
In the 2011 election, Rafiquer Rahaman of Trinamool Congress defeated his nearest rival Abdus Sattar of CPI(M).

2011 West Bengal state assembly election: Amdanga constituency
Party	Candidate	Votes	%	±%
AITC	Rafiquer Rahaman	87,162	53.79	+6.30#
CPI(M)	Abdus Sattar	65,605	40.48	−6.93
BJP	Joydeb Ghosh	4,633	2.86	
PDS	Motiar Rahaman Biswas	2,767	1.70	
BSP	Dr. Asok Kumar Golder	1,885	1.16	
Turnout		162,052	91.29	
AITC gain from CPI(M)		Swing	13.43#	

.# Swing calculated on Congress+Trinamool Congress vote percentages taken together in 2006.

=== 2006 ===
2006 West Bengal Legislative Assembly election: Amdanga
Party	Candidate	Votes	%	±%
CPI(M)	Abdus Sattar	77,923	48.53	
AITC	Rafiquer Rahaman	69,023	42.98	
INC	Rafiqul Islam	6,595	4.11	
Independent	Sanat Jana	2,573	1.60	
BSP	Dr. Asok Kumar Golder	2,278	1.42	
SS	Narayan Ghosh	1,144	0.71	
JD(S)	Sk. Noor Mohammad	1,040	0.65	
Majority		8,900	5.54	
Turnout				
CPI(M) hold		Swing		

=== 2001 ===
2001 West Bengal Legislative Assembly election: Amdanga
Party	Candidate	Votes	%	±%
CPI(M)	Hashim Abdul Halim	65,534	46.74	
AITC	Dr. M. Nuruzzaman	65,470	46.69	
BJP	Krishna Paul	5,638	4.02	
PDS	Motiar Rahaman Biswas	2,155	1.54	
Independent	Hazi Asraf Ali	1,413	1.01	
Majority		64	0.05	
Turnout		140,241	81.07	
CPI(M) hold		Swing		

=== 1996 ===
1996 West Bengal Legislative Assembly election: Amdanga
Party	Candidate	Votes	%	±%
CPI(M)	Hashim Abdul Halim	71,941	50.07	
INC	Md. Rafiqul Islam	65,172	45.36	
BJP	Balai Basu	6,083	4.23	
Independent	Mihir Chatterjee	479	0.33	
Majority		6,769	4.71	
Turnout		146,045	89.71	
CPI(M) hold		Swing		

=== 1991 ===
1991 West Bengal Legislative Assembly election: Amdanga
Party	Candidate	Votes	%	±%
CPI(M)	Hashim Abdul Halim	57,968	50.31	
INC	Idris Ali	43,844	38.05	
BJP	Dipak Saha	12,708	11.03	
JP	J. P. Alame	494	0.43	
Independent	Mondal Abdul Gaffer	209	0.18	
Majority		14,124	12.26	
Turnout		117,029	84.39	
CPI(M) hold		Swing		

=== 1987 ===
1987 West Bengal Legislative Assembly election: Amdanga
Party	Candidate	Votes	%	±%
CPI(M)	Hashim Abdul Halim	48,936	53.40	
INC	Asoke Krishna Dutt	38,026	41.50	
IUML	Sk. Rafikque Ali	3,206	3.50	
Independent	Santosh Kumar Ghosh	650	0.71	
Independent	Md. Shafiudin Mondal	342	0.37	
Independent	Molla Motaleb Hossain	254	0.28	
Independent	Dulal Biswas	224	0.24	
Majority		10,910	11.90	
Turnout		93,115	84.49	
CPI(M) hold		Swing		

=== 1982 ===
1982 West Bengal Legislative Assembly election: Amdanga
Party	Candidate	Votes	%	±%
CPI(M)	Hashim Abdul Halim	45,884	58.96	
IUML	C. F. Ali	24,950	32.06	
JP	Ashoke Krishna Dutt	5,379	6.91	
Independent	Dulal Biswas	577	0.74	
Independent	Dillon Sarkar	414	0.53	
Independent	Kshudiram Mondal	331	0.43	
Independent	Chowdhury Mufidual Islam	287	0.37	
Majority		20,934	26.90	
Turnout		79,224	82.78	
CPI(M) hold		Swing		

=== 1977 ===
1977 West Bengal Legislative Assembly election: Amdanga
Party	Candidate	Votes	%	±%
CPI(M)	Hashim Abdul Halim	27,189	51.84	
JP	Mira Dutta	11,435	21.80	
INC	Souren Sengupta	7,799	14.87	
IUML	Abdur Rashid Mallick	5,410	10.32	
Independent	Anil Das	436	0.83	
Independent	Khagendra Nath Roy	176	0.34	
Majority		15,754	30.04	
Turnout		53,184	66.29	
CPI(M) win (new seat)				
