= Mohammad Kasem Siddique =

Indian politician (born 1980)

Pirzada Mohammad Kasem Siddique

Member of the West Bengal Legislative Assembly
- Incumbent
- Assumed office 14 May 2026
- Preceded by: Rafiqur Rahaman
- Constituency: Amdanga

General Secretary, TMC WB state mother Committee
- Incumbent
- Assumed office 9 Jun 2025

Personal details
- Born: 1980 (age 45–46) Furfura, Hooghly district, West Bengal
- Party: Trinamool Congress (until 2026); Democratic Trinamool Congress (from 2026)
- Relations: Mohammad Abu Bakr Siddique (great grandfather)
- Parent: Mohammad Abdullahi Maruf Siddique (father)

Religious life
- Religion: Islam
- Denomination: Sunni
- Jurisprudence: Hanafi
- Tariqa: Silsila-e-Furfura

Mohammad Kasem Siddique (born 1980) is an Indian politician from West Bengal. He is a member of the West Bengal Legislative Assembly from Amdanga Assembly constituency in North 24 Parganas district, representing the Democratic Trinamool Congress.

== Early life and education ==
Siddique is from Jangipara, North 24 Parganas district, West Bengal. He is the son of Mohammad Abdullahi Maruf Siddique. He passed Fazil in 2006, a post graduate course in Islamic theology from West Bengal Board of Madrasah Education.

== Career ==
Siddique won the Amdanga Assembly constituency representing the All India Trinamool Congress in the 2026 West Bengal Legislative Assembly election. He declared assets worth Rs.69 lakhs in his affidavit to the Election Commission of India. He polled 81,670 and defeated his nearest rival, Arindam Dey of the Bharatiya Janata Party, by a margin of 2,995 votes.
