= Uluberia Purba Assembly constituency =

Uluberia Purba
- Constituency No. 176 for the West Bengal Legislative Assembly
- Interactive Map Outlining Uluberia Purba Assembly Constituency

Constituency details
- Country: India
- Region: East India
- State: West Bengal
- District: Howrah
- Lok Sabha constituency: Uluberia
- Established: 2011
- Total electors: 178,326
- Reservation: None

Member of Legislative Assembly
- 18th West Bengal Legislative Assembly
- Incumbent Ritabrata Banerjee
- Party: DTC
- Alliance: None
- Elected year: 2026

Uluberia Purba Assembly constituency is an assembly constituency in Howrah district in the Indian state of West Bengal.

== Overview ==
As per orders of the Delimitation Commission, the newly constituted No. 176 Uluberia Purba Assembly constituency is composed of the following: Uluberia municipality, and Khalisani and Raghudevpur gram panchayats of Uluberia II community development block.

Uluberia Purba Assembly constituency is part of No. 26 Uluberia (Lok Sabha constituency).

== Members of the Legislative Assembly ==
Year	Member	Party
2011	Haider Aziz Safwi	Trinamool Congress
2016	Haider Aziz Safwi	Trinamool Congress
2019^	Idris Ali	Trinamool Congress
2021	Bidesh Ranjan Bose	Trinamool Congress
2026	Ritabrata Banerjee	

- ^ by-election

=== 2026 ===
2026 West Bengal Legislative Assembly election: Uluberia Purba
Party	Candidate	Votes	%	±%
AITC	Ritabrata Banerjee	95,633	45.97	+1.14
BJP	Rudra Prosad Banerjee	83,795	40.28	+4.33
AISF	Ansar Ali Sheikh	21,909	10.53	−5.25
INC	Alam Deiyan Sheikh	1,926	0.93	
NOTA	None of the above	1,251	0.6	−0.49
Majority		11,838	5.69	−3.19
Turnout		208,025	95.16	+12.59
AITC hold		Swing		

=== 2021 ===
2021 West Bengal Legislative Assembly election: Uluberia Purba
Party	Candidate	Votes	%	±%
AITC	Bidesh Ranjan Bose	86,526	44.83	▼0.83
BJP	Pratyush Mondal	69,400	35.95	▼0.85
AISF	Abbas Uddin Khan	30,458	15.78	
NOTA	None of the above	2,111	1.09	
Majority		17,126	8.88	
Turnout		193,021	82.57	
AITC hold		Swing		

=== 2019 bypoll ===
Bye-election, 2019: Uluberia Purba
Party	Candidate	Votes	%	±%
AITC	Idris Ali	81,417	45.66	+3.47
BJP	Pratyush Mondal	65,626	36.80	+20.30
CPI(M)	Sabiruddin Molla	21,339	11.97	−20.71
INC	Alam Deiyan Sekh	6,891	3.86	N/A
NOTA	None of the above	1,418	0.80	−0.58
Majority		15,791	8.86	−0.65
Turnout		1,78,326		
AITC hold		Swing		

=== 2016 ===
2016 West Bengal Legislative Assembly election: Uluberia Purba
Party	Candidate	Votes	%	±%
AITC	Haider Aziz Safwi	72,192	42.19	−4.29
CPI(M)	Sabiruddin Molla	55,923	32.68	−0.60
BJP	Papiya Mondal	28,229	16.50	+1.99
Independent	Imtiaz Ahmed Mollah	5,262	3.08	
NOTA	None of the above	2,362	1.38	
Majority		16,269	9.51	−3.69
Turnout		1,71,104	83.06	−1.14
Registered electors		2,05,989		
AITC hold		Swing	-2.45	

=== 2011 ===
2011 West Bengal Legislative Assembly election: Uluberia Purba
Party	Candidate	Votes	%	±%
AITC	Haider Aziz Safwi	68,975	46.48	+3.38#
CPI(M)	Mohan Mondal	49,391	33.28	−15.12#
BJP	Papiya Mandal	21,530	14.51	
Independent	Sekh Sajahan	2,926		
BSP	Sunil Singh	1,226		
Majority		19,584	13.20	
Turnout		148,410	84.2	
AITC win (new seat)				
