= Baruipur Paschim Assembly constituency =

West Bengal Legislative Assembly Constituency

Baruipur Paschim
- Constituency No. 140 for the West Bengal Legislative Assembly
- Interactive Map Outlining Baruipur Paschim Assembly Constituency

Constituency details
- Country: India
- Region: East India
- State: West Bengal
- District: South 24 Parganas
- Lok Sabha constituency: Jadavpur
- Established: 1951
- Total electors: 253,592
- Reservation: None

Member of Legislative Assembly
- 18th West Bengal Legislative Assembly
- Incumbent Biman Banerjee
- Party: MAITC
- Elected year: 2026

Baruipur Paschim Assembly constituency is a Legislative Assembly constituency of South 24 Parganas district in the Indian State of West Bengal.

== Overview ==
As per order of the Delimitation Commission in respect of the Delimitation of constituencies in the West Bengal, Baruipur Paschim Assembly constituency is composed of the following:

- Baruipur municipality
- Dhapdhapi-I, Dhapdhapi-II, Hariharpur, Kalyanpur, Madarat, Mallikpur, Shankarpur-I, Shankarpur-II, Shikharbali-I and Shikharbali-II gram panchayats of Baruipur community development block

Baruipur Paschim Assembly constituency is a part of No. 22 Jadavpur Lok Sabha constituency.

== Members of the Legislative Assembly ==
Year	Name	Party
Baruipur
1952	Lalit Kumar Sinha	Communist Party of India
1952	Abdus Shukur	Indian National Congress
1957	Khagendra Kumar Roy Choudhury	Communist Party of India
1957	Gangadhar Naskar	Communist Party of India
1962	Sakti Kumar Sarkar	Indian National Congress
1967	Kumud Ranjan Mondal	Samyukta Socialist Party
1969	Kumud Ranjan Mondal	Samyukta Socialist Party
1971	Bimal Mistry	Communist Party of India (Marxist)
1972	Lalit Gayen	Indian National Congress
1977	Hemen Majumdar	Communist Party of India (Marxist)
1982	Hemen Majumdar	Communist Party of India (Marxist)
1987	Hemen Majumdar	Communist Party of India (Marxist)
1991	Sovandeb Chattopadhyay	Indian National Congress
1996	Sovandeb Chattopadhyay	Indian National Congress
1998^	Sujan Chakraborty	Communist Party of India (Marxist)
2001	Arup Bhadra	Trinamool Congress
2006	Rahul Ghosh	Communist Party of India (Marxist)
Baruipur Paschim
2011	Biman Banerjee	Trinamool Congress
2016	Biman Banerjee	Trinamool Congress
2021	Biman Banerjee	Trinamool Congress
2026	Biman Banerjee	Trinamool Congress

== Election results ==
=== 2026 ===
2026 West Bengal Legislative Assembly election: Baruipur Paschim
Party	Candidate	Votes	%	±%
AITC	Biman Banerjee	104,781	47.41	▼9.86
BJP	Biswajit Paul	86,919	39.32	▲11.35
CPI(M)	Lahek Ali	23,479	10.62	▼1.51
NOTA	None of the above	1,110	0.50	▼0.23
Majority		17,862	8.09	▼21.21
Turnout		221,031	94.77	▲11.5
AITC hold		Swing		

=== 2021 ===
2021 West Bengal Legislative Assembly election: Baruipur Paschim
Party	Candidate	Votes	%	±%
AITC	Biman Banerjee	121,006	57.27	▲2.54
BJP	Debopam Chattopadhyay	59,096	27.97	▲20.41
CPI(M)	Lahek Ali	25,639	12.13	▼22.6
NOTA	None of the above	1,536	0.73	
Majority		61,910	29.3	
Turnout		211,293	83.27	
AITC hold		Swing		

=== 2016 ===
2016 West Bengal Legislative Assembly election: Baruipur Paschim
Party	Candidate	Votes	%	±%
AITC	Biman Banerjee	99,945	54.73	▼2.81
CPI(M)	Saifuddin Khan	63,413	34.73	▼2.01
BJP	Basabdatta Banerjee	13,812	7.56	▲4.83
NOTA	None of the above	2,217	1.21	New entry
SUCI(C)	Gopinath Mondal	1,136	0.62	New entry
Independent	Mukul Mondal	1,013	0.55	New entry
Independent	Debabrata Mondal	631	0.35	New entry
LJP	Mrinal Kanti Mondal	437	0.24	New entry
Majority		36,532	20.00	▼0.80
Turnout		1,82,604	85.77	▲1.36
AITC hold		Swing		

=== 2011 ===
2011 West Bengal Legislative Assembly election: Baruipur Paschim
Party	Candidate	Votes	%	±%
AITC	Biman Banerjee	88,187	57.54	
CPI(M)	Kanak Kanti Paria	56,299	36.74	
BJP	Raneswar Das	4,191	2.73	
PDCI	Taher Ali Sheikh	1,458	0.95	
BSP	Ajit Mondal	1,330	0.87	
Independent	Mukul Mondal	1,058	0.69	
Independent	Anich Gazi	729	0.48	
Majority		31,888	20.80	
Turnout		1,53,252	84.41	
AITC win (new seat)				

=== 2006 ===
In 2006, Rahul Ghosh of CPI(M) won the Baruipur Assembly constituency defeating his nearest rival Arup Bhadra of AITC. Arup Bhadra of AITC defeated Sujan Chakraborty of CPI(M) in 2001. Sovandeb Chattopadhyay of INC defeated Sujan Chakraborty of CPI(M) in 1996 and Hemen Majumdar of CPI(M) in 1991. Hemen Majumdar of CPI(M) defeated Arup Bhadra of INC in 1987, Jalil Gazi of INC in 1982 and Ram Kanta Mondal of INC in 1977.

=== 1972 ===
Lalit Gayen of INC won in 1972. Bimal Mistry of CPI(M) won in 1971. Kumud Ranjan Mondal of SSP won in 1969 and 1967. Sakti Kumar Sarkar of INC won in 1962. In 1957 and 1952, Baruipur Assembly constituency had joint seats. Khagendra Kumar Roy Choudhury and Gangadhar Naskar, both of CPI, won in 1957. In 1952, Lalit Kumar Sinha of CPI and Abdus Shukur of INC, won.
