= Ishwar Das Jalan =

Indian politician

Ishwar Das Jalan was an Indian politician belonging to the Indian National Congress who was a legislator of the West Bengal Legislative Assembly from Bara Bazar constituency. He served as Speaker of the West Bengal Legislative Assembly from 21 November 1947 to 19 June 1952.
