= Saila Kumar Mukherjee =

Indian politician

Speaker of the West Bengal Legislative Assembly
- In office 20 June 1952 – 20 March 1957

Member of the West Bengal Legislative Assembly
- In office 1951–1958
- Constituency: Howrah East Assembly constituency
- In office 1962–1972
- Constituency: Howrah Uttar Assembly constituency

Personal details
- Party: Indian National Congress

Saila Kumar Mukherjee sometimes Saila Kumar Mukhopadhyay was an Indian politician. He was 2nd Speaker of the West Bengal Legislative Assembly from 20 June 1952 to 20 March 1957. He was Member of the West Bengal Legislative Assembly from Howrah East Assembly constituency in 1951 and the Howrah Uttar Assembly constituency since 1962 and 1967. He was associated with Indian National Congress.
