= Sukanta Biswas =

Indian politician and Teacher

Member of the West Bengal Legislative Assembly
- Incumbent
- Assumed office 4 May 2026
- Preceded by: Ashis Kumar Biswas
- Constituency: Krishnanaganj

Personal details
- Party: Bharatiya Janata Party
- Profession: Politician

Sukanta Biswas is an Indian politician and teacher from West Bengal. He is a member of West Bengal Legislative Assembly, from Krishnaganj Assembly constituency.
