= Sankar Das Banerji =

Indian politician

Sankar Das Banerji (January 1903 – 23 March 1994) was a Bengali Indian politician and barrister. He was the Speaker of West Bengal State Assembly and former Finance Minister of West Bengal. Banerji was a prominent criminal lawyer of his time in the Calcutta High Court. His nephew Satyabrata Mookherjee was a former Indian Union Minister of State. He had 3 sons (Kalidas, Shyamadas and Shivdas) and 1 daughter (Aloka).

== Early life ==
Banerji was born in Kolkata in 1903 in British India. He hailed from a Jamindar family of Paglachandi village, Plassey in Nadia district. His father passed from University College Hospital, of London and worked with Louis Pasteur. Banerji studied in Hindu School, Kolkata and acquired law degree from the Calcutta University, later he joined Lincoln's Inn, called to the Bar in 1927. After returning to India he started practice in the Calcutta High Court. He served as the Standing Counsel of Government of West Bengal in Calcutta High Court from 1950 to 1957. He was appointed Advocate General in 1967.

== Political career ==
He joined Indian National Congress for active politics in 1952. Banerji was elected to the West Bengal Legislative Assembly. In 1968, Banerji formed the Indian National Democratic Front. He became the Speaker of West Bengal State Assembly since 1957 to 1959 and Finance and Transport Minister during the period of 1962–63. He also contested 1980 and 1984 Indian general election from Krishnanagar Lok Sabha but lost.
