= Bijoy Kumar Banerjee =

Indian politician (1927–1971)

Speaker of the West Bengal Legislative Assembly
- In office 8 March 1967 – 2 May 1971

Bijoy Kumar Banerjee (1927–1996) was an Indian politician. He was the 6th Speaker of the West Bengal Legislative Assembly from 8 March 1967 to 2 May 1971.
