= Rathindra Bose =

Indian politician in West Bengal

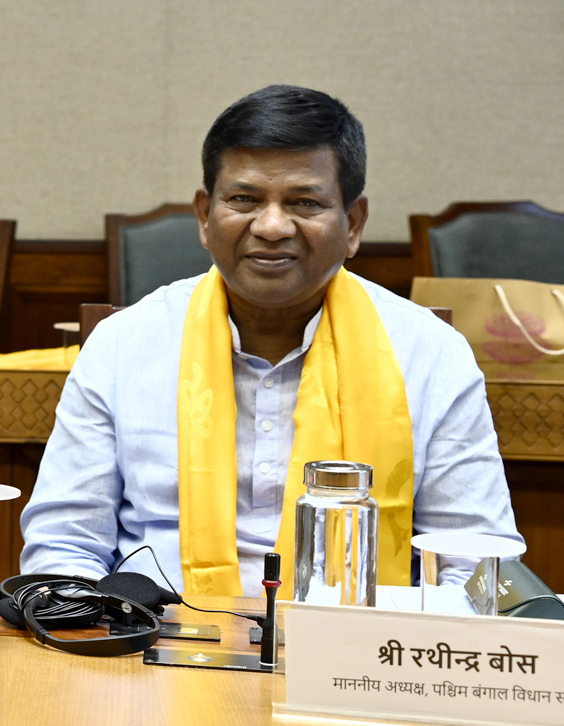
- Bose in 2026

18th Speaker of the West Bengal Legislative Assembly
- Incumbent
- Assumed office 15 May 2026
- Governor: R. N. Ravi
- Chief Minister: Suvendu Adhikari
- Preceded by: Biman Banerjee

Member of the West Bengal Legislative Assembly
- Incumbent
- Assumed office 4 May 2026
- Preceded by: Nikhil Ranjan Dey
- Constituency: Cooch Behar Dakshin

Personal details
- Party: Bharatiya Janata Party
- Spouse: Sampa Bose
- Parent: Rabindra Kumar Bose
- Education: Institute of Cost Accountants of India; Institute of Chartered Accountants of India, University of North Bengal
- Occupation: Chartered Accountant
- Profession: Politician

Rathindra Bose (Bengali: রথীন্দ্র বসু) is an Indian politician from West Bengal who serves as the 11th Speaker of the West Bengal Legislative Assembly since 15 May 2026. He is a member of West Bengal Legislative Assembly, from Cooch Behar Dakshin Assembly constituency. He is a member of Bharatiya Janata Party.

== Early life and education ==
Bose is from Cooch Behar district of West Bengal. He has done B. Com from University B.T. & Evening College, affiliated with University of North Bengal in the year 1979.

== Political career ==
Bose is a member of West Bengal Legislative Assembly, from Cooch Behar Dakshin Assembly constituency. He is currently serving as a speaker of the 18th West Bengal Assembly.

=== Electoral performance ===
West Bengal Legislative Assembly
| Year | Constituency | Party | Votes | % | Opponent | Party | Votes | % | Margin | Result |
|---|---|---|---|---|---|---|---|---|---|---|
| 2026 | Cooch Behar Dakshin | BJP | 108,482 | 52.81 | Avijit De Bhowmik | AITC | 85,198 | 41.48 | 23,284 | Won |

== See also ==
- 2026 West Bengal Legislative Assembly election
- List of chief ministers of West Bengal
- West Bengal Legislative Assembly
- 18th West Bengal Assembly
