= Haider Aziz Safwi =

Indian politician

Haider Aziz Safwi PPM IPS (Retd.)

Minister for Cooperation and Inland Water Transport, Government of West Bengal
- In office 20 May 2011 – 14 March 2013
- Governor: M. K. Narayanan
- Preceded by: Rabindranath Ghosh
- Succeeded by: Shankar Chakraborty

Minister for Correctional Administration, Government of West Bengal
- In office 14 March 2013 – 26 May 2016
- Governor: M. K. Narayanan; Keshari Nath Tripathi
- Preceded by: Shankar Chakrabarthy

Member of West Bengal Legislative Assembly
- In office 13 May 2011 – 12 December 2018
- Preceded by: Post created
- Succeeded by: Idris Ali
- Constituency: Uluberia Purba

Deputy Speaker of the West Bengal Legislative Assembly
- In office 23 June 2016 – 12 December 2018
- Governor: Keshari Nath Tripathi
- Preceded by: Sonali Guha (Bose)
- Succeeded by: Sukumar Hansda

Personal details
- Born: 26 February 1945 Lucknow, United Provinces, British India
- Died: 12 December 2018 (aged 73) Kolkata, West Bengal, India
- Party: Trinamool Congress (2009–2018)
- Spouse: Fatima Safwi
- Education: La Martinière College, Lucknow; Aligarh Muslim University (MSc)

Haider Aziz Safwi, popularly known as 'Safwi Saheb', was an IPS officer-turned politician. He was the Deputy Speaker of the West Bengal Legislative Assembly from 2016 until his death in December 2018, and previously a cabinet minister in the Government of West Bengal's first term in office. He held the portfolios of Minister for Cooperation and Inland Water Transport and Minister for Correctional Administration.

Safwi retired from the IPS in 2005 as the Director General of Police in West Bengal. He held many other offices during his IPS career and was a recipient of both the President's Police Medal for distinguished service and the Police Medal for Meritorious Service. Owing to his specialisation in law and order management, Safwi was appointed the first-ever Inspector General of South Bengal with an aim to control the rising crimes in the state.

After retiring from the IPS, Safwi entered politics. He was inspired to join the TMC in 2009 by Mamata Banerjee. He had publicly stated his desire to defeat the then CM Buddhadeb Bhattacharjee, from his home turf of Jadavpur, in the 2011 Assembly Elections, as the main aim of his political career. However, following an intervention by the TMC Supremo, Safwi was allotted a different constituency owing to his rapport with TMC MP Sultan Ahmed. He was elected for the TMC as a Member of the Legislative Assembly (MLA) from the Uluberia Purba constituency in the 2011 West Bengal state assembly election, with a margin of over 19,000 votes and his closest friend for over four decades, Retired IAS Officer Manish Gupta, defeated Buddhadeb Bhattacharjee from his own seat of Jadavpur. Safwi was inducted as a cabinet minister in the Mamata Banerjee government on 20 May 2011. He was allotted the portfolios of Co-operation and Inland Water Transport. As co-operation minister, Safwi was widely credited with putting in place a task force to reduce the number of sick co-operative banks in the state.

Safwi later moved to the Correctional Administration (Prisons) Department. He had requested this shift as he wanted a department which was more in line with his history as an IPS officer. The move had significant political ramifications and was widely discussed in the press as it was believed that Safwi had been resisting political pressure from the co-operative lobbies in the state. It was widely believed that Safwi wanted a change in portfolio since he was not willing to bow down to vested interests, many of whom were putting pressure on the department to reduce the tenure of co-operative societies from the existing tenure of 5 years to three years. As Prisons minister, he introduced a number of rehabilitation courses for the prisoners as he harped on prison-time being a period of self reflection and correction rather than only punishment. He established open-correctional homes for prisoners, a largely new concept in India until then, as well as the system of departmental medals in line with the police system of departmental medals for officers. Three new open-correctional homes were established in his tenure and a system was put in place to remove political pressure in postings, as well as a system of three time shifts for the staff. He once remarked ‘Don’t ever think that I can be threatened by unions’ during an interaction with officers.

In 2016, Safwi was renominated by the TMC from the Uluberia Purba seat and retained it by a margin of 16,269 votes. He was called ‘Uluberiar Roopkar’ (Man who built Uluberia). His two terms saw the building of Uluberia Stadium, Uluberia Railway-Over-Bridge (ROB), Uluberia Super Speciality Hospital, Bauria Drinking Water Project in addition to road building, drainage, street lights, CCTV in schools, public toilets, and re-development of cremation facilities and burial ground facilities.

He was elected unanimously as the Deputy Speaker of the West Bengal Legislative Assembly. His shift from the Cabinet to the post of Deputy Speaker was largely due to his non-controversial image and experience in administration. He stuck to the rule book in controversial matters pertaining to the conduct of the house.

On 12 December 2018, Safwi died following a sudden cardiac arrest while getting ready to leave his house to attend office at the Vidhan Sabha.

== Positions held ==
•Superintendent of Police (SP), 24 parganas (Undivided)

•Superintendent of Police, Burdwan

• Deputy Commissioner (DC) of the Eastern Suburban Division (ESD) of Kolkata Police

• Deputy Commissioner of the Central Division of Kolkata Police

• Deputy Commissioner of the Detective Department (DD) of Kolkata Police with additional charge of DC Headquarters.

• Deputy Inspector General (DIG) Presidency Range

• Inspector General (IG) South Bengal

• Director General (DG) of the Enforcement Branch (EB) of West Bengal Police

• Director General of Fire and emergency services in the rank of DGP.

Post Retirement from IPS

• Minister for Cooperation and Inland Water Transport.

• Minister for Correctional Administration, Govt of West Bengal.

• Deputy Speaker of West Bengal Legislative Assembly.

== Controversy ==
Although known as a hard-working and honest leader, Safwi would often create a stir by being blunt with his words. He would publicly chide officers for laxity. However the biggest controversy of his career remains the time when he was infamously denied the post of Police Commissioner of Kolkata in 1996 despite being initially recommended for it. This led to him very publicly taking on the then Minister of Personnel Buddhadeb Bhattacharya. Safwi attributed the decision to deny him the post of Commissioner to ‘extraneous considerations unexpected from a government claiming to uphold the secular credentials of the Indian Constitution’ and to his refusal to bow to Buddhadeb's commands. The incident had caused an uproar and Safwi had used the incident to attack Buddhadeb Bhattacharya publicly when he joined the Trinamool Congress. He described the incident as the most heartbreaking event of his career. It was only when the then Chief Minister Jyoti Basu intervened that the warring duo quietened down and Safwi withdrew his application for VRS (Voluntary Retirement from Service).

== Family ==
Both Safwi and his wife Fatima belonged to the erstwhile Royal Family of Awadh and were Taluqdars. While Safwi belonged to Unnao and was the titular taluqdar of Miyaganj, his wife belongs to the Royal Family of Gadia in Barabanki and is currently the titular taluqdar of Gadia. Following his demise, his younger son Hamed became the titular taluqdar of Miyaganj.

Safwi’s elder son died in 2011 following a massive heart attack on the night following Safwi’s first election victory while his younger son was still a student at the time of Safwi’s own demise.

Following Safwi’s demise, his family stayed away from holding any official or political positions in line with Safwi’s own belief that ‘democratic positions should not become a breeding ground for nurturing dynasties.’
