= Falguni Singhababu =

Indian politician

Member of the West Bengal Legislative Assembly
- In office 23 November 2024 – 4 May 2026
- Preceded by: Arup Chakraborty
- Succeeded by: Souvik Patra
- Constituency: Taldangra

Personal details
- Party: All India Trinamool Congress
- Profession: Politician

Falguni Singhababu aka Bali Falguni is an Indian politician from West Bengal. He is a member of the West Bengal Legislative Assembly since 2024, representing Taldangra Assembly constituency as a Member of the All India Trinamool Congress.

== See also ==
- List of chief ministers of West Bengal
- West Bengal Legislative Assembly
