= Krishnaganj Assembly constituency =

Krishnaganj
- Constituency No. 88 for the West Bengal Legislative Assembly
- Interactive Map Outlining Krishnaganj Assembly Constituency

Constituency details
- Country: India
- Region: East India
- State: West Bengal
- District: Nadia
- Lok Sabha constituency: Ranaghat
- Established: 1977
- Total electors: 253,036
- Reservation: SC

Member of Legislative Assembly
- 18th West Bengal Legislative Assembly
- Incumbent Sukanta Biswas
- Party: BJP
- Alliance: NDA
- Elected year: 2026

Most Successful parties from Krishnaganj (SC) assembly Since 2011
1. All India Trinamool Congress (3 times) (50.0%)
2. Bharatiya Janata Party (3 times) (50.0%)

Krishnaganj Assembly constituency is an assembly constituency in Nadia district in the Indian state of West Bengal. It is reserved for scheduled castes.

== Overview ==
As per orders of the Delimitation Commission, No. 88 Krishnaganj Assembly constituency (SC) is composed of the following: Krishnaganj community development block, and Badkulla-I, Badkulla-II, Betna Gobindapur, Dakshin Para I, Dakshin Para II, Gajna, Mayurhat I and Mayurhat II gram panchayats of Hanskhali community development block.

Krishnaganj Assembly constituency (SC) is part of No. 13 Ranaghat (Lok Sabha constituency) (SC).

== Members of the Legislative Assembly ==
=== Krishnaganj ===
Year	Name	Party
1977	Jnanendranath Biswas	Communist Party of India (Marxist)
1982	Jnanendranath Biswas	Communist Party of India (Marxist)
1983^	Jnanendranath Biswas	Communist Party of India (Marxist)
1987	Nayan Chandra Sarkar	Communist Party of India (Marxist)
1991	Sushil Biswas	Communist Party of India (Marxist)
1996	Sushil Biswas	Communist Party of India (Marxist)
2001	Sushil Biswas	Communist Party of India (Marxist)
2006	Binay Krishna Biswas	Communist Party of India (Marxist)

=== Krishnaganj (SC) ===
Year	Name	Party
2011	Sushil Biswas	Trinamool Congress
2015^	Satyajit Biswas	Trinamool Congress
2016	Satyajit Biswas	Trinamool Congress
2019^	Ashis Kumar Biswas	Bharatiya Janata Party
2021	Ashis Kumar Biswas	Bharatiya Janata Party
2026	Sukanta Biswas	Bharatiya Janata Party

- ^ = by-election

== Election results ==
=== 2026 ===
2026 West Bengal Legislative Assembly election: Krishnaganj
Party	Candidate	Votes	%	±%
BJP	Sukanta Biswas	139,838	60.15	▲9.42
AITC	Samir Kumar Poddar	78,939	33.96	▼7.6
CPI(M)	Archana Biswas	6,833	2.94	▼1.77
NOTA	None of the above	923	0.4	▼0.5
Majority		60,899	26.19	▲17.02
Turnout		232,467	91.35	▲6.62
BJP hold		Swing		

=== 2021 ===
Assembly elections, 2021: Krishnaganj
Party	Candidate	Votes	%	±%
BJP	Ashis Kumar Biswas	117,668	50.73	
AITC	Tapas Mandal	96,391	41.56	
CPI(M)	Jhunu Vaidya	10,913	4.71	
NOTA	None of the above	2,099	0.9	
Majority		21,277	9.17	
Turnout		231,938	84.73	
BJP hold		Swing		

=== 2019 ===
In the Krishnaganj seat, the by-election was held due to the murder of the sitting TMC MLA Satyajit Biswas.

Bye-elections, 2019: Krishnaganj
Party	Candidate	Votes	%	±%
BJP	Ashis Kumar Biswas	1,17,730	53.25	+44.94
AITC	Pramatha Ranjan Bose	86,850	39.29	−14.43
CPI(M)	Mrinal Biswas (Mini)	11,646	5.27	−27.86
INC	Bijay Biswas	3,109	1.41	−0.45
NOTA	None of the above	1,747	0.79	−0.05
Majority		30,866	13.96	
Turnout		2,21,235	83.70	
Registered electors		2,64,311		
BJP gain from AITC		Swing	+29.69	

=== 2016 ===
2016 West Bengal Legislative Assembly election: Krishnaganj
Party	Candidate	Votes	%	±%
AITC	Satyajit Biswas	1,14,626	53.72	+1.55
CPI(M)	Mrinal Biswas	70,698	33.13	−7.73
BJP	Sujit Kumar Biswas	17,741	8.31	+5.22
INC	Nitya Gopal Mondal	4,175	1.96	N/A
BSP	Rajnath Sarkar	2,197	1.03	−0.85
New Democratic Party of India	Biplab Kumar Golder	1,245	0.58	
SUCI(C)	Apurba Biswas	915	0.43	
NOTA	None of the above	1,795	0.84	
Majority		43,928	20.59	
Turnout		2,13,392	84.76	
Registered electors		2,51,773		
AITC hold		Swing		

=== 2015 ===
In the Krishnaganj seat, the by-election was held due to the death of the sitting TMC MLA Sushil Biswas on 21 October 2014.

West Bengal assembly by-elections, 2015: Krishnaganj (SC) constituency
Party	Candidate	Votes	%	±%
AITC	Satyajit Biswas	95,469	48.45	−3.72
BJP	Dr. Manabendra Ray	58,436	29.53	+26.44
CPI(M)	Dr. Apurba Kumar Biswas	37,620	19.01	−21.85
INC	Nitya Gopal Mondal	4,817	2.43	N/A
Nirjatita Samaj Biplabi Party	Biplab Kumar Golder	1,503	0.75	
NOTA	None of the above	1,826	0.92	
Majority		37,033	18.92	+7.61
Turnout		197,845		
AITC hold		Swing		

=== 2011 ===
In the 2011 election, Sushil Biswas of Trinamool Congress defeated his nearest rival Barun Biswas of CPI(M).

West Bengal assembly elections, 2011: Krishnaganj (SC) constituency
Party	Candidate	Votes	%	±%
AITC	Sushil Biswas	96,550	52.17	+2.99#
CPI(M)	Barun Biswas	75,616	40.86	−5.93
BJP	Bipul Chandra Sen	5,718	3.09	
BSP	Rajnath Sarkar	3,485	1.88	
Independent	Nisith Roy	2,165		
Nirjatita Samaj Biplabi Party	Biplab Kumar Golder	1,541		
Majority		20,934	11.31	
Turnout		185,075	87.99	
AITC gain from CPI(M)		Swing	+8.92#	

.# Swing calculated on Congress+Trinamool Congress vote percentages taken together in 2006.

=== 2006 ===
In the 2006 state assembly elections, Binay Krishna Biswas of CPI(M) won the 88 Krishnaganj (SC) assembly seat defeating his nearest rival Sushil Biswas of Trinamool Congress. Contests in most years were multi cornered but only winners and runners are being mentioned. Sushil Biswas of CPI(M) defeated Bidhan Chandra Poddar of Trinamool Congress/Congress in 2001, 1996 and 1991. Nayan Chandra Sarkar of CPI(M) defeated Mrinal Kanti Biswas of Congress in 1987. Jnanendranath Biswas of CPI(M) defeated Ananda Mohan Biswas of Congress in 1982 and Amulya Kumar Biswas of Janata Party in 1977. Prior to that, the constituency did not exist.
