= Taldangra Assembly constituency =

Taldangra
- Constituency No. 251 for the West Bengal Legislative Assembly
- Interactive Map Outlining Taldangra Assembly Constituency

Constituency details
- Country: India
- Region: East India
- State: West Bengal
- District: Bankura
- Lok Sabha constituency: Bankura
- Established: 1951
- Total electors: 179,693
- Reservation: None

Member of Legislative Assembly
- 18th West Bengal Legislative Assembly
- Incumbent Souvik Patra
- Party: BJP
- Alliance: NDA
- Elected year: 2026
- Preceded by: Falguni Singhababu

Taldangra Assembly constituency is an assembly constituency in Bankura district in the Indian state of West Bengal.

== Overview ==
As per orders of the Delimitation Commission, No. 251 Taldangra Assembly constituency is composed of the following: Bibarda, Fulmati, Harmasra, Khalgram, Panchmura and Taldangra gram panchayats of Taldangra community development block; Brojarajpur and Gaurbazar gram panchayats of Indpur community development block; and Simlapal community development block.

Taldangra Assembly constituency is part of No. 36 Bankura (Lok Sabha constituency).

== Members of the Legislative Assembly ==
Election	Member	Party
1952	Purabi Mukhopadhyay	Indian National Congress
1957	No Seat Exist	Casual vacancy
1962	Purabi Mukhopadhyay	Indian National Congress
1967	Purabi Mukhopadhyay	Indian National Congress
1969	Mohini Mohan Panda	Communist Party of India
1971	Mohini Mohan Panda	Communist Party of India
1972	Phani Bhushan Singhababu	Indian National Congress
1977	Mohoni Mohan Panda	Communist Party of India (Marxist)
1982	Mohoni Mohan Panda	Communist Party of India (Marxist)
1987	Amiya Patra	Communist Party of India (Marxist)
1991	Amiya Patra	Communist Party of India (Marxist)
1996	Monoranjan Patra	Communist Party of India (Marxist)
2001	Monoranjan Patra	Communist Party of India (Marxist)
2006	Monoranjan Patra	Communist Party of India (Marxist)
2011	Monoranjan Patra	Communist Party of India (Marxist)
2016	Samir Chakraborty	Trinamool Congress
2021	Arup Chakraborty	Trinamool Congress
^2024	Falguni Singhababu	Trinamool Congress
2026	Souvik Patra	Bharatiya Janata Party

^By Election

== Election results ==
=== 2026 ===
2026 West Bengal Legislative Assembly election: Taldangra
Party	Candidate	Votes	%	±%
BJP	Souvik Patra	124,537	56.62	▲22.5
AITC	Falguni Singhababu aka Bali Falguni	74,464	33.86	▼18.14
CPI(M)	Debkanti Mahanti	13,586	6.18	▼4.05
NOTA	None of the above	1,699	0.77	▼0.96
Majority		50,073	22.76	▲16.67
Turnout		219,936	92.91	▲5.81
BJP gain from AITC		Swing		

=== 2024 bypoll ===
2024 West Bengal Legislative Assembly by-election: Taldangra
Party	Candidate	Votes	%	±%
AITC	Falguni Singhababu	98,926	52.00	▲5.98
BJP	Ananya Roy Chakraborty	64,844	34.12	▼5.76
CPI(M)	Debkanti Mahanti	19,430	10.23	▼1.38
INC	Tushar Kanti Sannigrahi	2822	1.42	New
NOTA	None of the above	2,446	1.29	
Majority		34,082	40.5	
Turnout		188,468		
AITC hold		Swing		

=== 2021 ===
In the 2021 West Bengal Legislative Assembly election Arup Chakraborty of AITC won the Taldangra assembly seat defeating Shyamal Kumar Sarkar of BJP.

West Bengal assembly elections, 2021: Taldangra
Party	Candidate	Votes	%	±%
AITC	Arup Chakraborty	92,026	45.29	
BJP	Shyamal Kumar Sarkar (BENU)	79,649	39.2	
CPI(M)	Manoranjan Patra	23,189	11.41	
Independent	Sandip Kumar Dey	1,889	0.93	
NOTA	None of the above	3,518	1.73	
Majority		12,377	6.09	
Turnout		203,186	87.1	
AITC hold		Swing		

=== 2016 ===
In the 2016 state assembly elections, Samir Chakraborty of All India Trinamool Congress won the Taldangra assembly seat defeating his nearest rivals Amia Patra of CPI(M).

West Bengal assembly elections, 2016: Taldangra
Party	Candidate	Votes	%	±%
AITC	Samir Chakraborty	87,236	48.40	
CPI(M)	Amiya Patra	73,567	40.08	
BJP	Mahadeb Khan	11,741	6.50	
Turnout		1,80,192	87.10	
AITC gain from CPI(M)		Swing		

=== 2011 ===
West Bengal assembly elections, 2011: Taldangra
Party	Candidate	Votes	%	±%
CPI(M)	Monoranjan Patra	74,779	47.59	−13.87
INC	Arun Kumar Pathak	67,614	43.03	+10.58#
BJP	Milan Singha Mahapatra	6,110	3.89	
JDP	Dulal Saren	4,098		
Jharkhand Anushilan Party	Uzzwal Singha	1,810		
SUCI	Kabita Singha Babu	1,564		
JVM(P)	Kalipada Hembram	1,157		
Turnout		157,132	87.44	
CPI(M) hold		Swing	-24.45#	

.# Swing calculated on Congress+Trinamool Congress vote percentages taken together in 2006.

=== 2006 ===
In the 2006, 2001 and 1996 state assembly elections, Manoranjan Patra of CPI(M) won the Taldangra assembly seat defeating his nearest rivals Manik Mitra of Trinamool Congress, Dilip Panda of Trinamool Congress and Debaprasad Singha Barathakur of Congress, respectively. Contests in most years were multi cornered but only winners and runners are being mentioned. Amiya Patra of CPI(M) defeated Phani Bhusan Singhababu of Congress in 1991 and Amit Chatterjee of Congress in 1987. Mohini Mohan Panda of CPI(M) defeated Kalyani Prasad Singha Choudhury of Congress in 1982 and Phani Bhusan Singhababu of Congress in 1977.

=== 1972 ===
Phani Bhusan Singhababu of Congress won in 1972. Mohini Mohan Panda of CPI(M) won in 1971 and 1969. Purabi Mukhopadhyay of Congress won in 1967 and 1962. In 1957 there was no seat at Taldangra. Purabi Mukhopadhyay of Congress won the Taldangra seat in independent India's first election in 1952.
