= Satyajit Biswas =

Indian politician (c.1981–2019)

Member of the West Bengal Legislative Assembly
- In office 17 February 2015 – 9 February 2019
- Constituency: Krishnaganj (Vidhan Sabha constituency)

Personal details
- Born: c. 1981
- Died: February 9, 2019
- Party: All India Trinamool Congress
- Spouse: Rupaali Biswas
- Occupation: Politician

Satyajit Biswas (c. 1981 – 9 February 2019) was an Indian politician from the state of West Bengal. He was a two term member of the West Bengal Legislative Assembly.

He was shot dead on 9 February 2019 at the age of 37 after he was coming down at the podium of Saraswati puja. His widow Rupaali Biswas became the candidate of TMC of 2019 Indian general elections from Ranaghat (Lok Sabha constituency).

== Constituency ==
He represented the Krishnaganj (Vidhan Sabha constituency).

== Political party ==
He was from the All India Trinamool Congress.
