= Abdus Sattar (Amdanga politician) =

Indian politician

Abdus Sattar is a politician in West Bengal, India, belonging to the All India Trinamool Congress. He was a former Communist Party of India (Marxist) Politician.

== Career ==
After the 2006 West Bengal state assembly election (in which he was elected MLA from the Amdanga constituency), he became Minister of State for Minorities Development, Welfare and Madrasah Education in the Left Front Ministry. He is currently serving as Chief Advisor to Honorable Chief Minister and the Department of Minority Affairs and Madrasah Education, Government of West Bengal in the rank of Cabinet Minister of the State on 05.11.2024 by a Government Notification. Sattar was the president of the West Bengal Madrasah Board before serving as minister.

Primarily he is a professor of Bengali literature and language and a research scholar of Rabindra Literature.
