= Bijoy Prasad Singh Roy =

Indian politician (1894–1961)

Sir Bijoy Prasad Singh Roy
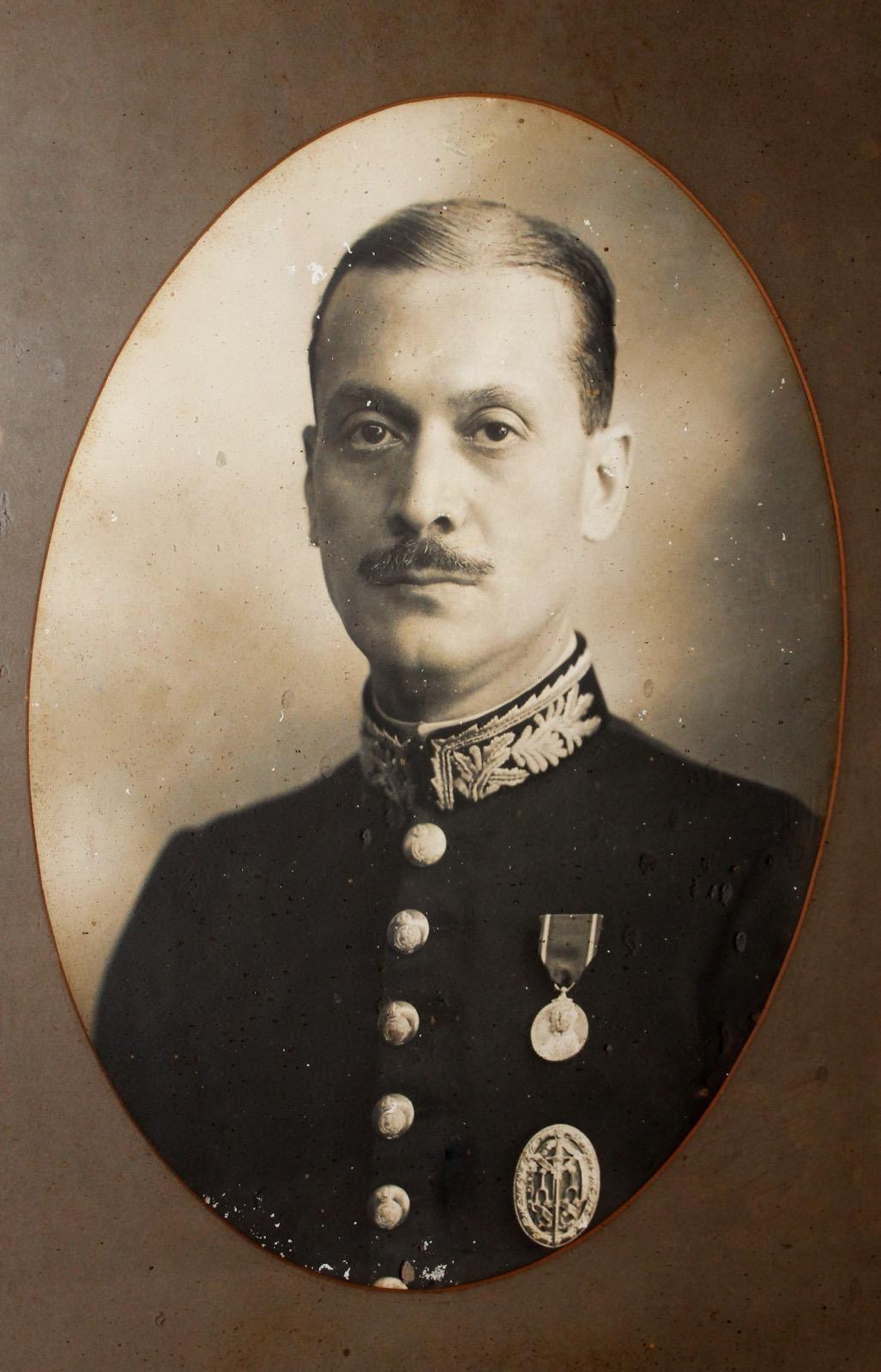

Member of the Bengal Legislative Assembly
- In office 1937–1945
- Succeeded by: Uday Chand Mahtab
- Constituency: Burdwan Landholders

Personal details
- Born: 12 January 1894 Calcutta, Presidency division, Bengal Presidency
- Died: 23 November 1961 (aged 67) Calcutta, West Bengal

Sir Bijoy Prasad Singh Roy, KCIE, Kt, MLC (12 January 1894 – 23 November 1961), was an Indian lawyer and politician. A prominent figure during the Indian independence movement, he had served as the President of the Indian National Liberation Foundation (Indian Liberal Party) and delivered its twenty-third session, held in Madras on 26 December 1941.

He was educated at the Chakdighi Sarada Prasad Institution, the Hindu School, and Presidency College. He studied law at Calcutta University College of Law, where he was appointed a Fellow of the Senate. He later practiced as an advocate at the Calcutta High Court.

In 1921, Singh Roy was elected to the Bengal Legislative Council in British India, where he was responsible for the Revenue Department. Singh Roy served for many years as a Councilor of the Calcutta Corporation and as a Trustee of the Calcutta Improvement Trust from 1924 to 1930. He was appointed Minister of Local Self-Government from 1930 to 1937 and served as the Finance Minister of Bengal under the new constitution from 1937 to 1941, in the cabinet of A.K. Fazlul Huq, Bengal's first and longest-serving prime minister during the British Raj. He later became the president of the Bengal Legislative Assembly, serving from 1943 until 1947. He was appointed Sheriff of Calcutta in 1952.

In April 1932, Singh Roy passed the Bengal Municipal Act, aimed at streamlining city management. The bill focused on expanding community representation, implementing financial and urban planning reforms, improving infrastructure, and enhancing public health and welfare. This bill had originally been introduced in 1923 by Surendranath Banerjea but was not passed by the Bengal Legislative Council at that time.

Singh Roy was knighted in 1933 and awarded the Knight Commander of the Order of the Indian Empire (KCIE) in 1943. The newspaper Civil and Military Gazette, Lahore, on 3 June 1933, read: "Mr. Bijoy Prasad Singh Roy, Minister of Local Self-Government, Bengal, is the recipient of the honor of knighthood for the services he has rendered to the cause of municipal reform."

On 17 February 1945, Singh Roy attended the British Commonwealth Relations Conference held in London alongside seven other members of the Indian delegation. The conference was notable for two main developments that included, discussions around the future of India and the transition to self-rule, as well as the formation of the United Nations. Leaders discussed the role of the Commonwealth in the new international organization and how the nations involved could collaborate in shaping global peace and security after World War II.

Following the first India-Pakistan war, on 6 July 1950, he delivered a speech on All India Radio regarding an Indo-Pakistani agreement.

Other notable positions include being appointed honorary 2nd Lieutenant in 1918; serving as a member of the Calcutta Volunteer Rifles, 2nd Bn, from 1913 to 1918; serving as a member and Honorary Assistant Secretary of the British Indian Association from 1925 to 1928; being a Trustee and vice-president of the association; representing the Landlords of Bengal before the Simon Commission in 1926; serving as a member of the Bengal Provincial Franchise Committee in 1932; acting as a Trustee of the Victoria Memorial; and being president of the All-India Kshatriya (Rajput) Mahasabha in 1939. In 1947, Singh Roy served as the president of the Calcutta Club.

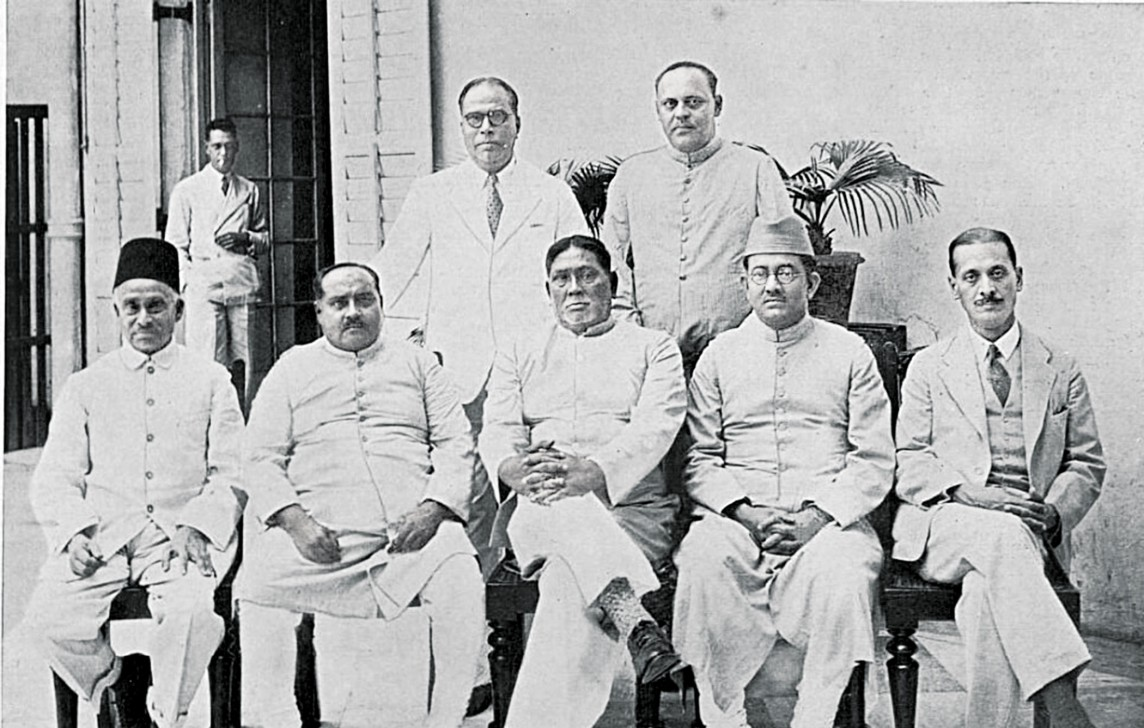
Cabinet of AK Fazlul Huq Cabinet 1937, Sir Bijoy Prasad Singhroy to the far right bottom row

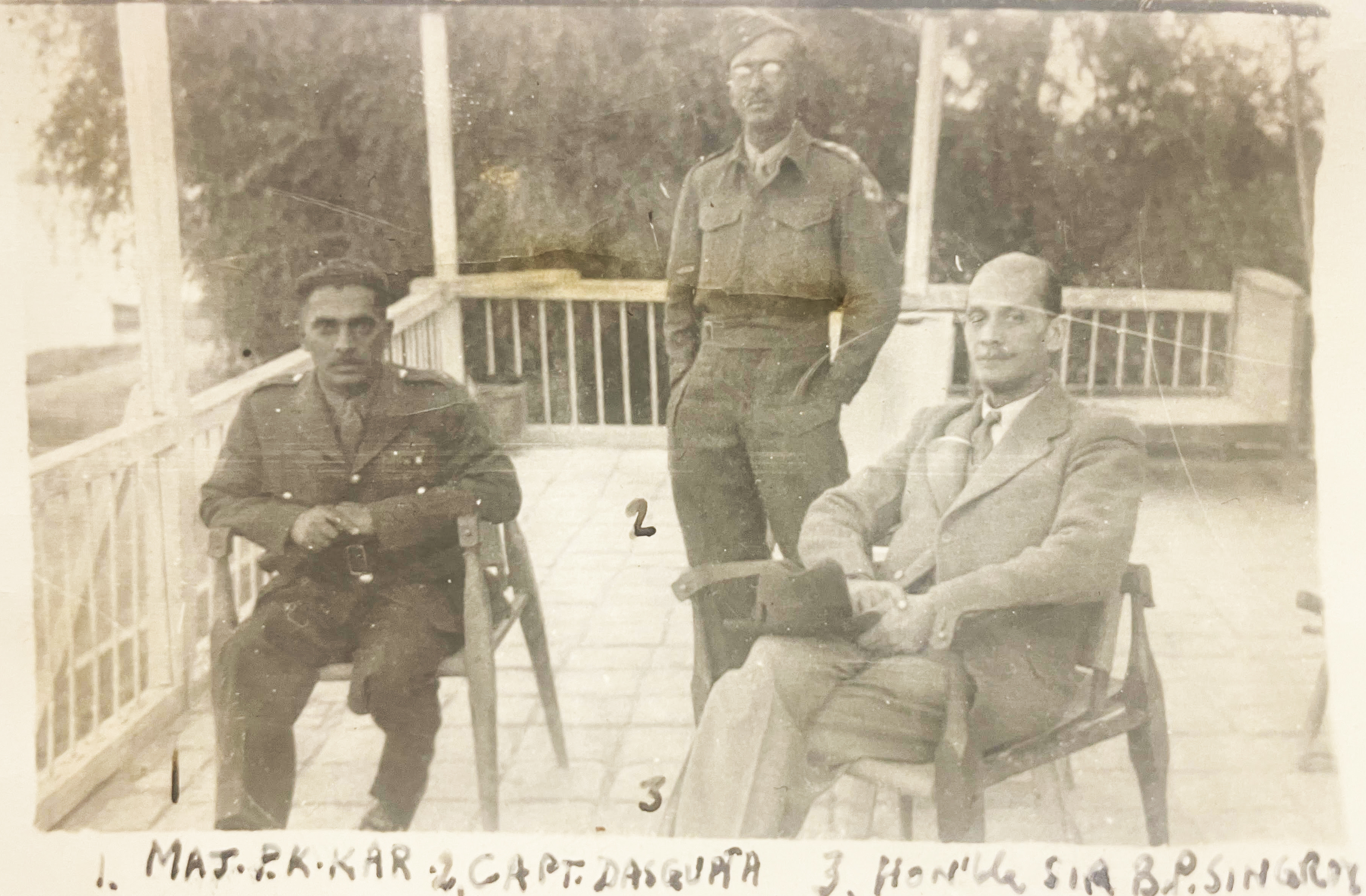
Sir Bijoy Prasad Singh Roy visits anti-malaria unit in Paiforce, 1945

Additionally, Singh Roy served as chairman of several companies, including Basanti Cotton Mills Ltd and Insulated Cable Co. Ltd. He also held directorships at Alkali Chemical Industries Ltd, The Imperial Bank of India, Lionel Edwards Ltd (Calcutta), Belvedere Jute Mills Ltd, Budge Budge Jute Mills Ltd, India Steamship Co. Ltd, and the Reserve Bank of India.

From 1958 to 1959, he was the chairman of the Federation of Indian Chambers of Commerce and Industry (FICCI). Stanley A. Kochanek, in this paper, The Federation of Indian Chambers of Commerce and Industry and Indian Politics, noted that Sir Bijoy Prasad Singh Roy, along with Lalji Mehotra (in 1948), were the only two FICCI presidents not connected with a major business house and therefore able to offer balanced views.

In the 1950s, Singh Roy became the president of the Lighthouse for the Blind in Calcutta, as noted in a letter from M.S. Sengar, the honorary secretary, dated 1 June 1955, that expressed gratitude to Dr. Helen Keller and her secretary, Miss Polly Thompson, for their visit and contributions to the institution.

Singh Roy wrote the foreword to Studies in the Land Economics of Bengal by Sachin Sen in 1935 and authored the report The Sapru Scherre of Constitutional Reform & its Implications in March 1942. His book, Parliamentary Government in India, was published in July 1943, with a foreword by Sir Tej Bahadur Sapru. The book provides a detailed account of the history of India's constitutional development over the sixty years leading up to 1943.

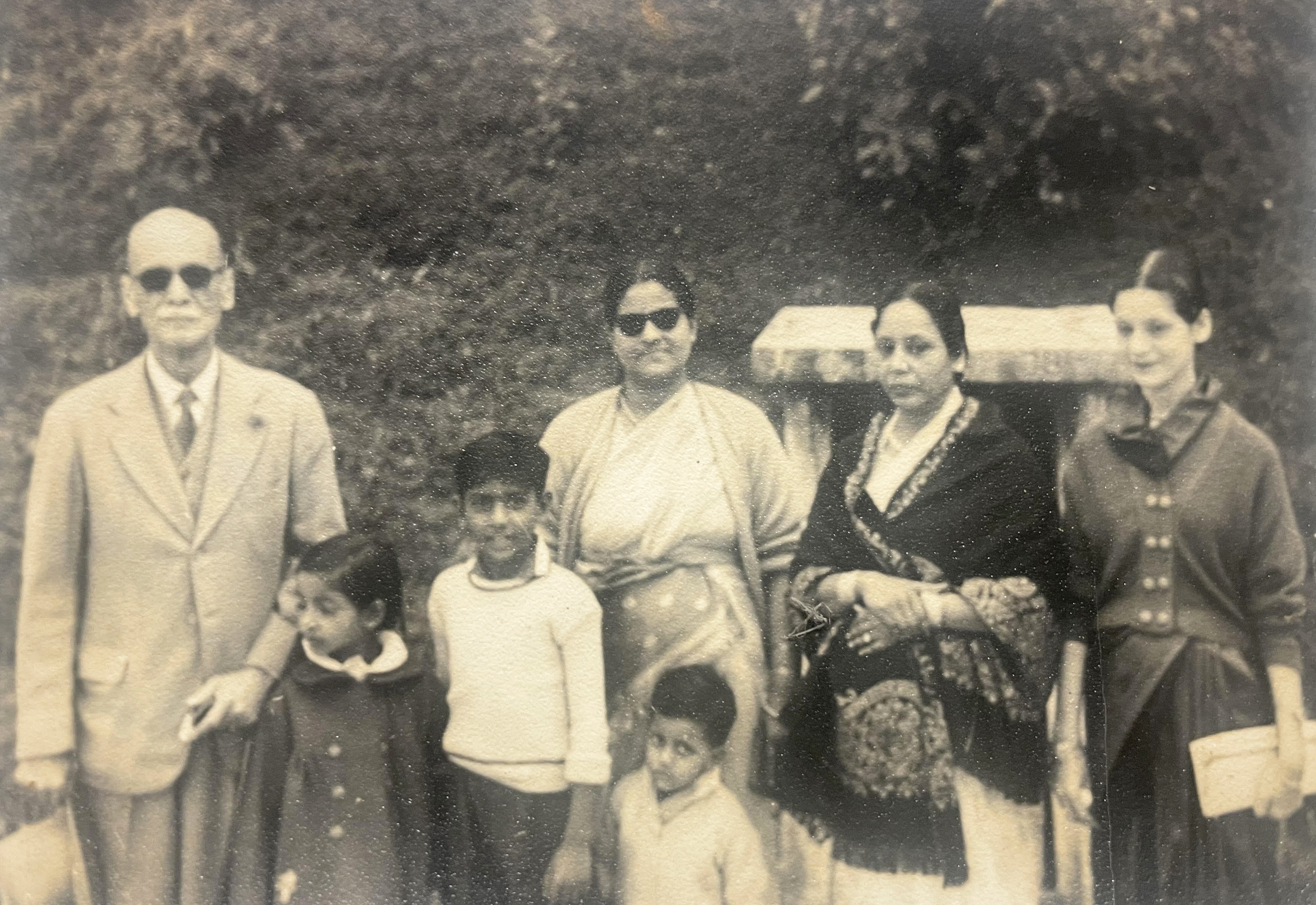
Sir Bijoy Prasad Singh Roy (far left) with his only granddaughter, Bishakha Singh Roy (far right), and daughter Suhasini Singh Roy (left of Bishakha, her daughter); others unknown.

Born into an aristocratic Rajput family that migrated to Bengal during the Mughal period for political reasons in the 1600s, his ancestors later assumed the role of zamindars in Burdwan district - their philanthropy had influenced the trajectory of his career. His father was Rajani Lall Singh Roy and his mother was Srimati Binoylata Debi. Sir Bijoy Prasad Singh Roy was married to Lady Bilwabasini Debi Singh Roy. They had five children: Sunil, Avarani, Suhasini, Dilip, and Manjusree, as well as three grandchildren: Bishakha, Archan, and Ishwari. His great-grandchildren include Sreerupa (Singh Roy) Majumdar, Rajyashree Singh Roy and Sanjoy Singh Roy. His great-great-grand children include Aleena Majumdar and Ishani Tagore. (formerly Ishani Majumdar)
