= Boro Maa =

Religious person

Binapani Thakur
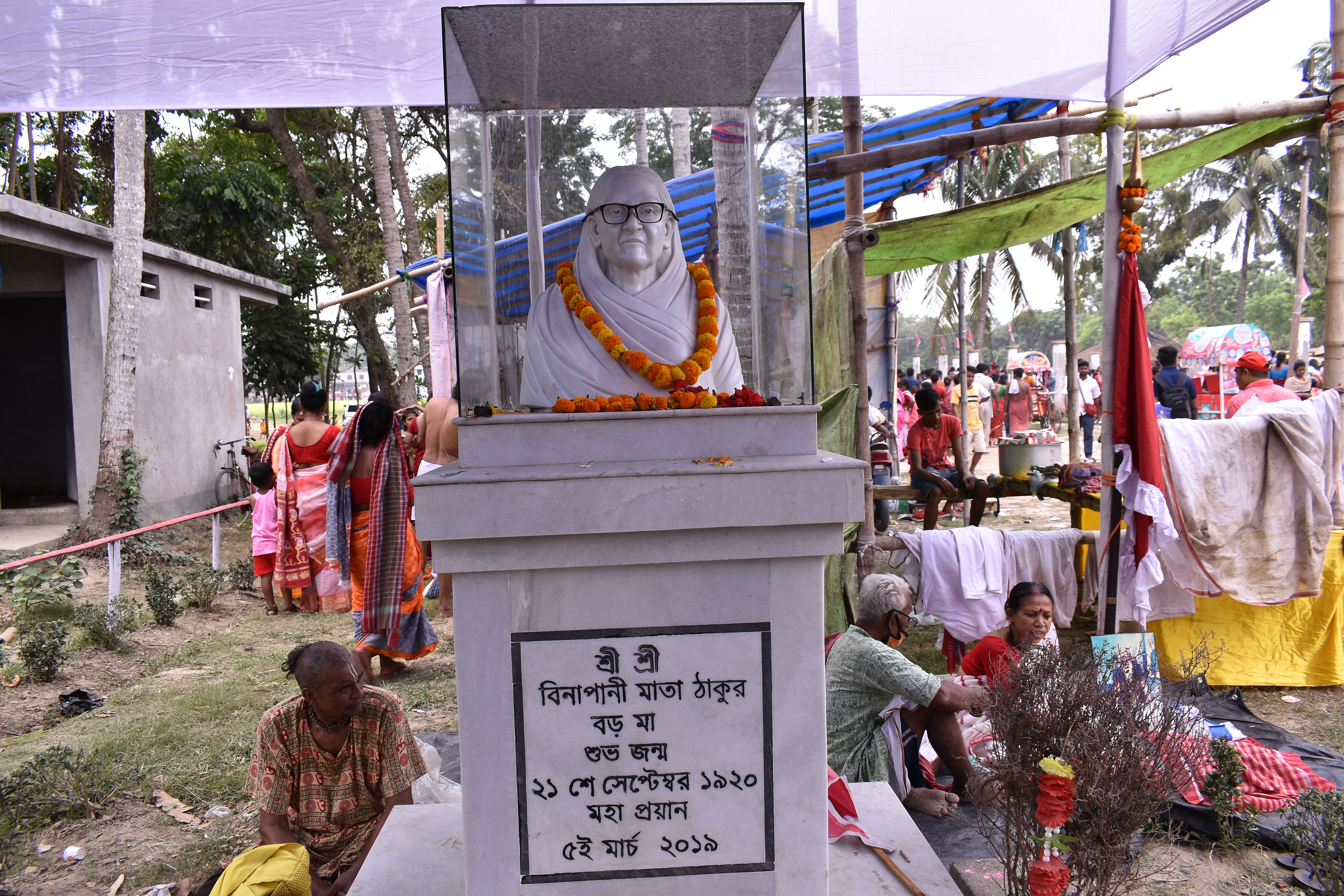

Personal life
- Born: Binapani Devi c. 1918 Jabdakathi, Barishal, Bengal Presidency, British India
- Died: 5 March 2019 (aged 100–101) Kolkata, West Bengal, India
- Spouse: Pramatha Ranjan Thakur (m. 1933; died 1990)
- Honors: Banga Bibhushan (2018)

Religious life
- Religion: Hinduism
- Founder of: Thakurnagar
- Philosophy: Swayam Dikshiti

Religious career
- Teacher: Harichand Thakur

Boro Maa (c. 1918 – 5 March 2019) was a matriarch of the Matua Mahasangha, a Hindu religious reformation movement. Her original name was Binapani Devi Thakur; the name "Boro Maa" translates to "elder mother", an epithet for universal mother of Matua Community. She along with her husband Pramatha Ranjan Thakur established the community's new capital at Thakurnagar.

== Career ==
Boro Maa was born in 1918 in Jabdakathi, Barishal District, Bengal Presidency. In 1933, she married Pramatha Ranjan Thakur, a great-grandson of Harichand Thakur, the founder of Matua Mahasangha.

In 1947, India became independent and the province of Bengal was partitioned into Muslim majority East Bengal (which became a part of Pakistan and later became Bangladesh) and Hindu majority West Bengal (which became a state of India). In the following year, Boro Maa along with her family and a large number of Matuas migrated to West Bengal. Along with her husband, she created a refugee colony at Thakurnagar for the displaced Matuas.

In 1990, Boro Maa was widowed. She became the chief adviser and matriarch of the community. In the following years, she spread the teachings of Harichand Thakur across India.

On 15 March 2010, Boro Maa appointed Mamata Banerjee (the then future Chief Minister of West Bengal) as the chief patron of the community. In November 2018, she was awarded Banga Bibhushan, the highest civilian award of West Bengal.

On 5 March 2019, Boro Maa died at Kolkata, aged 100. She had been suffering from high fever, COPD, and mild diabetes. Her funeral was held with full state honours on 7 March and a gun salute was given to her by the state government. Upon her death, her daughter-in-law Mamata Bala Thakur was appointed pro tem adviser of the community.

== Personal life ==
Boro Maa's elder son Kapil Krishna Thakur represented Bongaon constituency in Indian parliament in 2014 as a candidate of Trinamool Congress. After his death, his wife Mamata Bala Thakur was elected. Boro Maa's younger son Manjul Krishna Thakur defected to the Bharatiya Janata Party in 2015. Her grandson, Shantanu Thakur, was elected as Member of Parliament for BJP from Bongaon Constituency in 2019.
