= Bangaon Uttar Assembly constituency =

West Bengal Legislative Assembly constituency

Bangaon Uttar
- Constituency No. 95 for the West Bengal Legislative Assembly
- Interactive Map Outlining Bangaon Uttar Assembly Constituency

Constituency details
- Country: India
- Region: East India
- State: West Bengal
- District: North 24 Parganas
- Lok Sabha constituency: Bangaon
- Established: 1951
- Total electors: 251,387
- Reservation: SC

Member of Legislative Assembly
- 18th West Bengal Legislative Assembly
- Incumbent Ashok Kirtania
- Party: BJP
- Alliance: NDA
- Elected year: 2026

Bangaon Uttar Assembly constituency is an assembly constituency in North 24 Parganas district in the Indian state of West Bengal. It is reserved for scheduled castes.

Successful parties after 2011
1. BJP(twice) (50.0%)
2. Trinamool Congress(twice) (50.0%)
1951-2011
1. Indian National Congress (5 times) (31.2%)
2. Communist Party of India(4 times) (25.0%)
3. Communist Party of India (Marxist)(4 times) (25.0%)
4. Trinamool Congress(thrice) (18.8%)

== Overview ==
As per orders of the Delimitation Commission, No. 95 Bangaon Uttar Assembly constituency (SC) is composed of the following: Bangaon municipality, and Akaipur, Chhaigheria, Dharma Pukuria, Ganganandapur, Ghatbore, Gopalnagar I and Gopalnagar II gram panchayats of Bangaon community development block.

Bangaon Uttar Assembly constituency (SC) is part of No. 14 Bangaon (Lok Sabha constituency) (SC). Bongaon assembly constituency was earlier part of Barasat (Lok Sabha constituency).

== Members of the Legislative Assembly ==
Year	Name	Party
Bangaon
1951	Jiban Ratan Dhar	Indian National Congress
1957	Ajit Kumar Ganguly	Communist Party of India
1957	Manindra Bhusan Biswas	Indian National Congress
1962	Jiban Ratan Dhar	Indian National Congress
1967	K. Bhowmick	Indian National Congress
1969	Ajit Kumar Ganguly	Communist Party of India
1971	Ajit Kumar Ganguly	Communist Party of India
1972	Ajit Kumar Ganguly	Communist Party of India
1977	Ranajit Mitra	Communist Party of India (Marxist)
1982	Bhupendranath Seth	Indian National Congress
1987	Ranajit Mitra	Communist Party of India (Marxist)
1991	Bhupendranath Seth	Indian National Congress
1996	Pankaj Ghosh	Communist Party of India (Marxist)
2001	Pankaj Ghosh	Communist Party of India (Marxist)
2006	Bhupendranath Seth	Trinamool Congress
2006 (By-election)	Saugata Roy	Trinamool Congress
2009 (By-election)	Gopal Seth	Trinamool Congress
Assembly Split from Bangaon, renamed Bangaon Uttar
2011	Biswajit Das	Trinamool Congress
2016	Biswajit Das	Trinamool Congress
2021	Ashok Kirtania	Bharatiya Janata Party
2026	Ashok Kirtania	Bharatiya Janata Party

== Election results ==
=== 2026 ===
2026 West Bengal Legislative Assembly election: Bangoan Uttar
Party	Candidate	Votes	%	±%
BJP	Ashok Kirtania	119,317	56.46	▲8.81
AITC	Biswajit Das	78,647	37.21	▼5.33
CPI(M)	Pijush Kanti Saha	8,554	4.05	▼2.8
NOTA	None of the above	1,500	0.71	▼0.18
Majority		40,670	19.25	▲14.14
Turnout		211,344	93.11	▲11.49
BJP hold		Swing		

=== 2021 ===
In the 2021 election, Ashok Kirtania of BJP defeated his nearest rival, Shyamal Roy of AITC.

West Bengal assembly elections, 2021: Bangaon Uttar (SC) constituency
Party	Candidate	Votes	%	±%
BJP	Ashok Kirtania	97,761	47.65	
AITC	Shyamal Roy	87,273	42.54	
CPI(M)	Pijush Kanti Saha	14,051	6.85	
NOTA	None of the above	1,833	0.89	
Majority		10,488	5.11	
Turnout		205,175	81.62	
BJP gain from AITC		Swing		

=== 2016 ===
In the 2016 election, Biswajit Das of Trinamool Congress defeated his nearest rival Sushanta Baowali of All India Forward Bloc.

West Bengal assembly elections, 2016: Bangaon Uttar (SC) constituency
Party	Candidate	Votes	%	±%
AITC	Biswajit Das	95,822	50.59	▼3.96
AIFB	Sushanta Baowali	62,630	33.07	New entry
BJP	K D Biswas	21,262	11.23	▲8.08
BSP	Suniti Mallick	4,840	2.56	▲1.44
NOTA	None of the above	2,182	1.15	
RPI(A)	Juran Chandra Pandey	1290	0.68	
SUCI(C)	Shyamsundar Halder	831	0.44	
Majority		33,192	17.52	▲3.09
Turnout		189,396	82.46	
AITC hold		Swing		

=== 2011 ===
In the 2011 election, Biswajit Das of Trinamool Congress defeated his nearest rival Dr. Biswajit Biswas of CPI(M).

West Bengal assembly elections, 2011: Bangaon Uttar (SC) constituency
Party	Candidate	Votes	%	±%
AITC	Biswajit Das	89,265	54.55	
CPI(M)	Dr. Biswajit Biswas	65,645	40.12	
BJP	Hari Chand Biswas	5,149	3.15	
BSP	Ganesh Chandra Biswas	1,828	1.12	
The Religion of Man Revolving Political Party of India	Pinaki Ranjan Bharati	995		
Majority		23,620	14.43	
Turnout		163,641	86.84	
AITC win (new seat)				

=== 2009 ===
In the 2009 bye-election caused by the election of sitting MLA, Saugata Roy to the Lok Sabha from Dum Dum, Gopal Seth of All India Trinamool Congress won the Bangaon seat.

In the 2006 bye-election caused by the death of the sitting MLA, Bhupen Seth, Saugato Roy of Trinamool Congress defeated Pankaj Ghosh of CPI(M).

In the 2006 state assembly elections, Bhupendranath Seth of Trinamool Congress won the Bongaon assembly seat defeating his nearest rival Pankaj Ghosh of CPI(M). Contests in most years were multi cornered but only winners and runners are being mentioned. Pankaj Ghosh of CPI(M) defeated Bhupendranath Seth, Independent and Congress respectively) in 2001 and 1996. Bhupendranath Seth of Congress defeated Ranajit Mitra of CPI(M) in 1991. Ranajit Mitra of CPI(M) defeated Bhupendranath Seth of Congress in 1987. Bhupendranath Seth of Congress defeated Ranajit Mitra of CPI(M) in 1982. Ranajit Mitra of CPI(M) defeated Bhupendranath Seth of Congress in 1977.

=== 2006 ===
Before spiltted:Bongaon

In the 2006 election, Bhupendra nath Seth of Trinamool Congress defeated his nearest rival Pankaj Ghosh of CPI(M).

2006 West Bengal Legislative Assembly election: Bangaon
Party	Candidate	Votes	%	±%
AITC	Bhupendra Nath Seth	86,213		
CPI(M)	Pankaj Ghosh	82748		
BSP	Makhan Roy	2176		
Independent	Pinaki Ranjan Bharati	1565		
The Religion of Man Revolving Political Party of India	Sukriti Ranjan Biswas	1298		
Amra Bangalee	Biseswar Mondal	871		
Turnout		174871		
AITC gain from CPI(M)		Swing		

=== 2001 ===
2001 West Bengal state assembly election: Bangaon
Party	Candidate	Votes	%	±%
CPI(M)	Pankaj Ghosh	66561	44.93%	
Independent	Bhupendra Nath Seth	44595	30.1%	
AITC	Prosanto Nath	26567	17.93%	
BJP	Kishore Biswas	4546	3.07%	
Bahujan Samaj Party	Kalyan Mallick	3268	2.21%	
Party For Democratic Socialism	Ashoke Ghosh	1424		0.96%
Amra Bangalee	Ashim Biswas	1186	0.8%	
Turnout		148147	82.37%	
CPI(M) hold		Swing		

=== 1996 ===
West Bengal assembly elections, 1996: Bangaon constituency
Party	Candidate	Votes	%	±%
CPI(M)	Pankaj Ghosh	68,251	47.83%	
INC	Bhupendra Nath Seth	66,583	46.66%	
BJP	Ajoy Ghosh	4639	3.25%	
BSP	Phanindra Nath Sikdar	2874	2.01%	
AMB	Bisweshwar Mondal	356	0.25%	
Turnout		1,42,703	88.25%	
CPI(M) gain from INC		Swing		

=== 1991 ===
West Bengal assembly elections, 1991: Bangaon constituency
Party	Candidate	Votes	%	±%
INC	Bhupendra Nath Seth	53153	42.76%	
CPI(M)	Ranajit Mitra	51521	41.44%	
BJP	Kishore Kumar Biswas	16668	13.41%	
BSP	Sachindra Nath Biswas	1799	1.45%	
Independent	Bisweshwar Mondal	586	0.47%	
Independent	Rabindra Nath Mondal	209	0.13%	
Independent	Bina Chakraborty	162	0.13%	
Turnout		1,24,313	85.28%	
INC gain from CPI(M)		Swing		

=== 1987 ===
1987 West Bengal state assembly election: Bangaon
Party	Candidate	Votes	%	±%
CPI(M)	Ranajit Mitra	52061	50.3%	
INC	Bhupendra Nath Seth	49554	47.87%	
Independent	Bisweshwar Mondal	759	0.73%	
Independent	Ajit Biswas	755	0.73%	
Independent	Paramananda Haldar	382	0.37%	
Turnout		1,03,511	84.21%	
CPI(M) gain from INC		Swing		

=== 1982 ===
In 1982, Bongaon legislative assembly constituency had total 109673 electors. Total number of valid vote was 90755. Indian National Congress candidate Bhupendra Nath Seth won and became MLA from this seat. He secured total 46545 votes. Communist Party of India (Marxist) candidate Ranjit Mitra stood second with total 42939 votes. He lost by 3606 votes.

1987 West Bengal state assembly election: Bangaon
Party	Candidate	Votes	%	±%
INC	Bhupendra Nath Seth	46545	51.29%	
CPI(M)	Ranajit Mitra	42939	47.31%	
Janta Party	Ranjit Biswas	1141	1.26%	
Independent	Ashutosh Paul	130	0.14%	
Turnout		90,755	83.91%	
INC gain from CPI(M)		Swing		

=== 1977 ===
1977 West Bengal state assembly election: Bangaon
Party	Candidate	Votes	%	±%
CPI(M)	Ranajit Mitra	27820	47.15%	
INC	Bhupendra Nath Seth	18619	31.55%	
Communist Party Of India	Krishna Dulal Biswas	7427	12.59%	
JP	Balohari Mondal	5141	8.71%	
Turnout		59007	63.78%	
CPI(M) gain from Communist Party Of India		Swing		

=== 1972 ===
Ajit Kumar Ganguly of CPI won in 1972, 1971 and 1969. K.Bhowmick of Congress won in 1967. Jiban Ratan Dhar of Congress won in 1962. In 1957, Bongaon was a joint seat. Ajit Kumar Ganguly of CPI and Manindra Bhusan Biswas of Congress won in 1957. Jiban Ratan Dhar of Congress won in 1951.
