= Thakurnagar =

- village
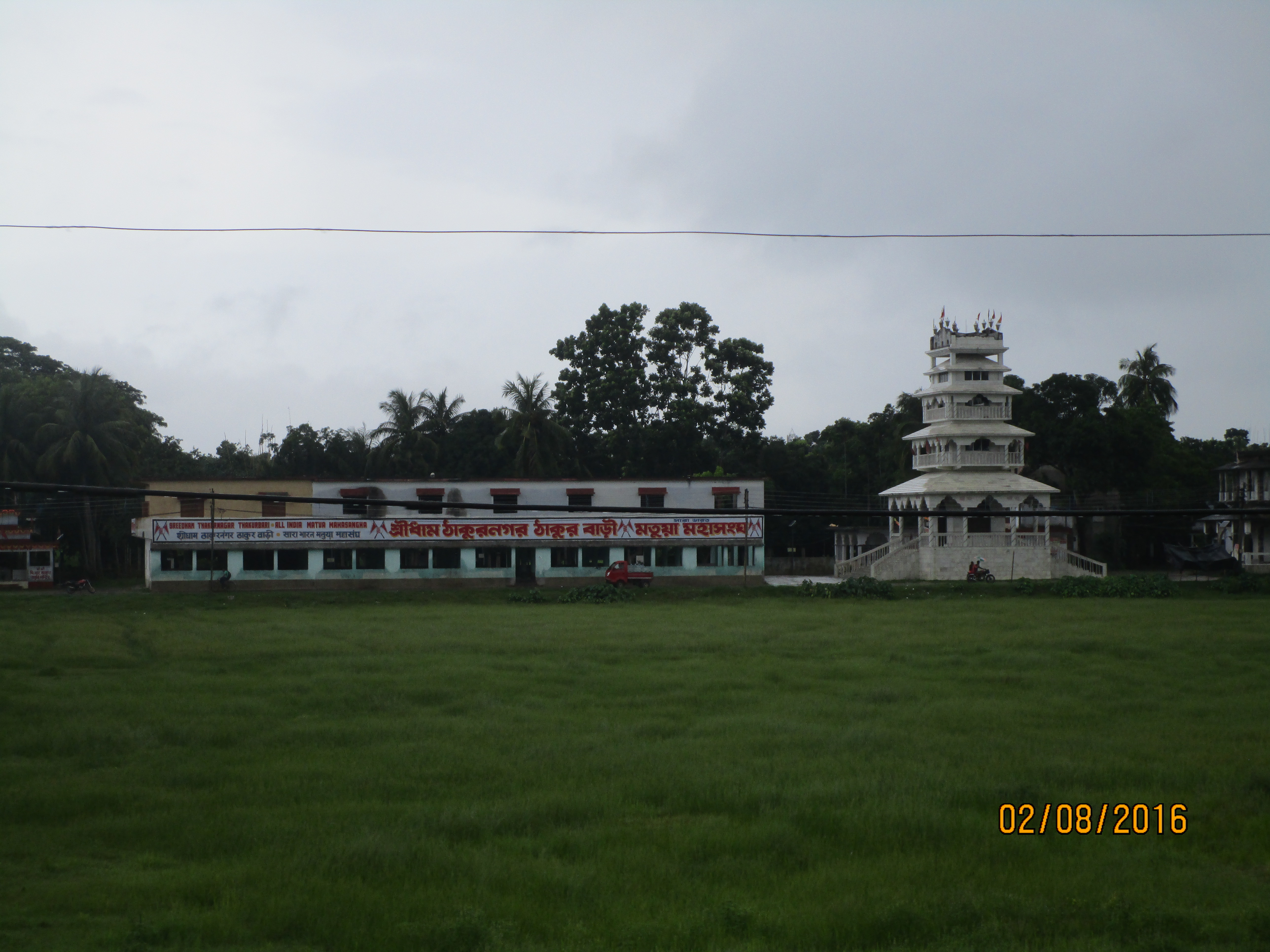
- Thakurnagar Matua Mahasangha Thakurbari

- Location in West Bengal, India Thakurnagar (India)
- Coordinates: 22°55′28″N 88°46′40″E
- Country: India
- State: West Bengal
- District: North 24 Parganas
- Founder: Pramatha Ranjan Thakur
- Named for: Harichand Thakur

Government
  - MP: Shantanu Thakur (Bharatiya Janata Party)
  - MLA: Subrata Thakur (Bharatiya Janata Party)

Languages
  - Official: Bengali, English
- Time zone: UTC+5:30 (IST)
- PIN: 743287
- Telephone/STD code: 03215
- Lok Sabha constituency: Bangaon
- Vidhan Sabha constituency: Gaighata
- Website: north24parganas.nic.in

Thakurnagar is a village in Gaighata CD Block in Bangaon subdivision of North 24 Parganas district in the state of West Bengal, India.

== History ==
Thakurnagar is named after Pramath Ranjan Thakur, the great-grandson of the founder of the Hindu Matuan movement, Harichand Thakur. Due to the Thakurs' significance to the Matua Mahasangha, the village is considered the "Mecca of Matuas."

Today, Thakurnagar is best known for the nearby Thakur Bari ("House of the Thakurs" in English). Thakurnagar is also known for its large flower market. It hosts a famous Baruni Mela.

== Geography ==
Cities, towns and locations in Bangaon subdivision, North 24 Parganas district
M: municipal town, CT: census town, R: rural/ urban centre, T: place of tourist interest
Owing to space constraints in the small map, the actual locations in a larger map may vary slightly

=== Location ===
Thakurnagar is located 63.4 km northeast of Kolkata. It is to the east of the Bangladesh border.

There have been reports of the formation of a Thakurnagar municipality in near future. However, as of May 2018, no notification has been issued to that effect.

=== Area overview ===
The area shown in the map was a part of Jessore district from 1883. At the time of Partition of Bengal (1947) the Radcliffe Line placed the police station areas of Bangaon and Gaighata of Jessore district in India and the area was made a part of 24 Parganas district. It is a flat plain located in the lower Ganges Delta. In the densely populated area, 16.33% of the population lives in the urban areas and 83.67% lives in the rural areas.

Note: The map alongside presents some of the notable locations in the subdivision. All places marked in the map are linked in the larger full screen map.

== Health concern ==
The ground water in North 24 Parganas district is affected by arsenic contamination.

== Demographics ==
In the 2011 Census of India, Thakurnagar was not identified as a separate place. The population is included in that of nearby places, but it is not differentiated in the census records.

== Notable people ==
- Binoy Majumdar
- Pramath Ranjan Thakur
- Boro Maa
- Kapil Krishna Thakur
- Shantanu Thakur
- Subrata Thakur
- Mamata Bala Thakur
- Madhuparna Thakur
- Manjul Krishna Thakur
- Asim Bala

== See also ==
- Thakurnagar railway station
