= Bangaon Dakshin Assembly constituency =

West Bengal Legislative Assembly constituency

Bangaon Dakshin
- Constituency No. 96 for the West Bengal Legislative Assembly
- Interactive Map Outlining Bangaon Dakshin Assembly Constituency

Constituency details
- Country: India
- Region: East India
- State: West Bengal
- District: North 24 Parganas
- Lok Sabha constituency: Bangaon
- Established: 1951
- Total electors: 248,278
- Reservation: SC

Member of Legislative Assembly
- 18th West Bengal Legislative Assembly
- Incumbent Swapan Majumder
- Party: BJP
- Alliance: NDA
- Elected year: 2026

Bangaon Dakshin Assembly constituency is an assembly constituency in North 24 Parganas district in the Indian state of West Bengal. It is reserved for scheduled castes.

== Overview ==
As per orders of the Delimitation Commission, No. 96 Bangaon Dakshin Assembly constituency (SC) is composed of the following: Bairampur, Chauberia I, Chauberia II, Dighari, Kalupur and Palla gram panchayats of Bangaon community development block, and Chandpara, Dooma, Fulsara, Jaleswar II, Jhaudanga and Ramnagar gram panchayats of Gaighata community development block.

Bangaon Dakshin Assembly constituency (SC) is part of No. 14 Bangaon (Lok Sabha constituency) (SC). Bongaon assembly constituency was earlier part of Barasat (Lok Sabha constituency).

== Members of the Legislative Assembly ==
Year	Name	Party
Bangaon
1951	Jiban Ratan Dhar	Indian National Congress
1957	Ajit Kumar Ganguly	Communist Party of India
1957	Manindra Bhusan Biswas	Indian National Congress
1962	Jiban Ratan Dhar	Indian National Congress
1967	K. Bhowmick	Indian National Congress
1969	Ajit Kumar Ganguly	Communist Party of India
1971	Ajit Kumar Ganguly	Communist Party of India
1972	Ajit Kumar Ganguly	Communist Party of India
1977	Ranajit Mitra	Communist Party of India (Marxist)
1982	Bhupendranath Seth	Indian National Congress
1987	Ranajit Mitra	Communist Party of India (Marxist)
1991	Bhupendranath Seth	Indian National Congress
1996	Pankaj Ghosh	Communist Party of India (Marxist)
2001	Pankaj Ghosh	Communist Party of India (Marxist)
2006	Bhupendranath Seth	All India Trinamool Congress
2006 (By-election)	Saugata Roy.	All India Trinamool Congress
2009 (By-election)	Gopal Seth.	All India Trinamool Congress
Assembly Spilleted from Bangaon, renamed Bangaon Dakshin
2011	Surajit Kumar Biswas	All India Trinamool Congress
2016	Surajit Kumar Biswas	All India Trinamool Congress
2021	Swapan Majumder	Bharatiya Janata Party
2026	Swapan Majumder	Bharatiya Janata Party

== Election results ==
=== 2026 ===
2026 West Bengal Legislative Assembly election: Bangoan Dakshin
Party	Candidate	Votes	%	±%
BJP	Swapan Majumder	119,399	56.27	▲9.2
AITC	Rituparna Addhya	81,585	38.45	▼7.66
CPI(M)	Asish Kumar Sarkar	6,197	2.92	▼1.92
NOTA	None of the above	932	0.44	▼0.3
Majority		37,814	17.82	▲16.86
Turnout		212,191	92.72	▲9.01
BJP hold		Swing		

=== 2021 ===
In the 2021 election, Swapan Majumder of the BJP defeated his nearest rival Alo Rani Sarkar of AITC.

West Bengal assembly elections, 2021: Bangaon Dakshin
Party	Candidate	Votes	%	±%
BJP	Swapan Majumder	97,828	47.07	▲34.08
AITC	Alo Rani Sarkar	95,824	46.11	
CPI(M)	Tapas Kumar Biswas	10,069	4.84	▼30.03
NOTA	None of the above	1,542	0.74	
Majority		2,004	0.96	
Turnout		207,834	83.71	
BJP gain from AITC		Swing	{{{swing}}}	

=== 2016 ===
West Bengal assembly elections, 2016: Bangaon Dakshin
Party	Candidate	Votes	%	±%
AITC	Surajit Kumar Biswas	92,379	49.2	▼4.51
CPI(M)	Ramendranath Audhya	65,475	34.87	▼5.43
BJP	Swapan Majumder	24,384	12.99	▲9.78
BSP	Pradip Kumar Sarkar	1,616	0.86	▼0.34
NOTA	None of the Above	1,512	0.81	New
AMB	Dipankar Mandal	1,484	0.79	New
CPI(ML)L	Pranballabh Pathak	925	0.49	▼1.08
Majority		26,904	14.33	▲0.92
Turnout		1,87,775	83.45	▼2.89
AITC hold		Swing	{{{swing}}}	

=== 2011 ===
In the 2011 election, Surajit Kumar Biswas of Trinamool Congress defeated his nearest rival Anuj Baran Sarkar of CPI(M).

West Bengal assembly elections, 2011: Bangaon Dakshin
Party	Candidate	Votes	%	±%
AITC	Surajit Kumar Biswas	87,677	53.71	
CPI(M)	Anuj Baran Sarkar	65,788	40.30	
BJP	Arun Halder	5,243	3.21	
CPI(ML)L	Himangshu Biswas	2,561		
BSP	Rabindra Nath Biswas	1,961		
Turnout		163,230	86.63	
AITC win (new seat)				

=== 2009 ===
In the 2009 bye-election caused by the election of sitting MLA, Saugata Roy to the Lok Sabha from Dum Dum, Gopal Seth of All India Trinamool Congress won the Bangaon seat.

In the 2006 bye-election caused by the death of the sitting MLA, Bhupen Seth, Saugato Roy of Trinamool Congress defeated Pankaj Ghosh of CPI(M).

In the 2006 state assembly elections, Bhupendranath Seth of All India Trinamool Congress won the Bongaon assembly seat defeating his nearest rival Pankaj Ghosh of CPI(M). Contests in most years were multi cornered but only winners and runners are being mentioned. Pankaj Ghosh of CPI(M) defeated Bhupendranath Seth, Independent and Congress respectively) in 2001 and 1996. Bhupendranath Seth of Congress defeated Ranajit Mitra of CPI(M) in 1991. Ranajit Mitra of CPI(M) defeated Bhupendranath Seth of Congress in 1987. Bhupendranath Seth of Congress defeated Ranajit Mitra of CPI(M) in 1982. Ranajit Mitra of CPI(M) defeated Bhupendranath Seth of Congress in 1977.

=== 1972 ===
Ajit Kumar Ganguly of CPI won in 1972, 1971 and 1969. K.Bhowmick of Congress won in 1967. Jiban Ratan Dhar of Congress won in 1962. In 1957, Bongaon was a joint seat. Ajit Kumar Ganguly of CPI and Manindra Bhusan Biswas of Congress won in 1957. Jiban Ratan Dhar of Congress won in 1951.
