= Madhuparna Thakur =

Indian politician

- মধুপর্ণা ঠাকুর

Member of the West Bengal Legislative Assembly
- In office 13 July 2024 – 4 May 2026
- Preceded by: Biswajit Das
- Succeeded by: Soma Thakur
- Constituency: Bagdah

Personal details
- Party: Trinamool Congress
- Parents: Kapil Krishna Thakur (father); Mamata Bala Thakur (mother)
- Relatives: Shantanu Thakur and Subrata Thakur (Cousin)
- Education: BSc in Zoology
- Alma mater: West Bengal State University
- Occupation: Social Worker

Madhuparna Thakur is an Indian politician from West Bengal. As a member of Trinamool Congress, she is the incumbent MLA from Bagdah. Elected at the age of 25, she was the youngest MLA in the history of West Bengal at the time of her election.

== Political career ==
She contested the Legislative Bye-election in 2024 after the sitting MLA Biswajit Das resigned to contest the 2024 Indian general election, and won by a majority of 33,455 votes over the runner-up candidate, Binay Kumar Biswas of the BJP. However, she lost to BJP candidate Soma Thakur by a margin of 34,616 votes in the 2026 West Bengal Legislative Assembly election.

== Electoral results ==
| Year | Assembly | Party | Margin | Results |
|---|---|---|---|---|
| 2024 | Bagdah | All India Trinamool Congress | 33,455 | Won |
| 2026 | Bagdah | All India Trinamool Congress | 34,616 | Lost |
