= Namassejsantokotha =

The preachings of Santos or Rishis of Namassej community are known as Namassej santo kotha. This includes the preachings of adi-santoguru Purno Brohmo Sri Sri Harichand Thakur and others. These are revelations of Parameswar Brohmo as Bharhutbrahma revealing in meditation or in trance.

Every year Matua Folk Festivals are held in Thakurnagar, India and Orakandi, Bangladesh.
