= Pipli (West Bengal) =

- Village
- Location in West Bengal, India Pipli (India)
- Coordinates: 22.948145°N 88.884532°E
- Country: India
- State: West Bengal
- District: North 24 Parganas

Population (2011)
  - Total: 1,808

Languages
  - Official: Bengali, English
- Time zone: UTC+5:30 (IST)
- PIN: 743249
- Telephone/STD code: 03216
- Lok Sabha constituency: Bangaon
- Vidhan Sabha constituency: Bangaon Dakshin
- Website: north24parganas.nic.in

Pipli is a village in Gaighata CD Block in Bangaon subdivision of North 24 Parganas district in the state of West Bengal, India.

== Geography ==
The village is near the Ichamati River which is the border between India and Bangladesh. Pipli has two primary schools.

Gaighata CD Block has a border of 21.72 km, of which 15 km is unfenced (as of May 2018).

== Demographics ==
In the 2011 Census of India, Pipli had a total population of 1,808, of which 917 (51%) were males and 891 (49%) were females. Population below 6 years was 136. The total number of literates in Pipli was 1402 (83.85% of the population over 6 years).

== Transport ==
The Jhaudanga-Pipli-Tentulberia Road serves the border area. 3 Wheelers like Auto-rickshaws, Toto (from Jhowdanga to Tentulberia ) available for going to Pipli.

- Most important thing is that You are requested to keep Photo ID Card( Specially Voter ID card) with you when you are traveling to Pipli because there are two BSF check post on the way.
