= Kulghuti =

- Village
- Location in West Bengal, India Kulghuti (India)
- Coordinates: 22°50′0″N 88°38′0″E
- Country: India
- State: West Bengal
- District: North 24 Parganas

Population (2011)
  - Total: 1,302

Languages
  - Official: Bengali, English
- Time zone: UTC+5:30 (IST)
- PIN: 743249 (Kulghuti)
- Telephone/STD code: 03215
- Lok Sabha constituency: Bangaon
- Vidhan Sabha constituency: Gaighata
- Website: north24parganas.nic.in

Kulghuti is a village in the Gaighata CD block in the Bangaon subdivision of the North 24 Parganas district in the state of West Bengal, India.

== Demographics ==
According to the 2011 Census of India, Kulghuti had a total population of 1,302, of which 666 were males and 636 were females.
