= Pulin Bihari Ray =

Indian politician

Member of the West Bengal Legislative Assembly
- In office 2016–2021
- Preceded by: Manjul Krishna Thakur
- Succeeded by: Subrata Thakur
- Constituency: Gaighata

Personal details
- Party: Trinamool Congress
- Education: Calcutta University
- Profession: Politician

Pulin Bihari Ray is an Indian politician from West Bengal. He was elected as a Member of the Legislative Assembly in 2016 West Bengal Legislative Assembly election from Gaighata, as a member of the Trinamool Congress.
