= Niren =

Niren may refer to

- Niren De, Attorney General of India
- Niren Ghosh, Indian politician
- Niren Lahiri, Indian film director
- Philip Toelkes, also known as Swami Prem Niren
- Neil Niren Connery, Full name of Scottish actor Neil Connery
