= Kamalakshi Biswas =

Indian politician

Kamalakshi Biswas (born 1937)-(Death 3rd September 2025) was an Indian politician from West Bengal. He was a former five-time member of the West Bengal Legislative Assembly from Bagdah Assembly constituency, which is reserved for the Scheduled Caste community in North 24 Parganas district. He won for the first time in the 1977 West Bengal Legislative Assembly election representing All India Forward Bloc.

== Early life and education ==
Biswas was from Bagdah, North 24 Parganas district, West Bengal. His father was Kutiswar Biswas. He has qualified for the 10th examination. His son Gour Biswas contested in the 2024 election.

== Career ==
Biswas first became an MLA, winning the 1977 West Bengal Legislative Assembly election representing the All India Forward Bloc (AIFB). He retained the seat for the Forward Bloc in the 1982 West Bengal Legislative Assembly election. Later, after a gap of one term, where he lost to Apurba Lal Majumdar of the Indian National Congress in the 1987 election, he won for three consecutive times on All India Forward Bloc ticket. He won the 1991 West Bengal Legislative Assembly election, 1996 Assembly election and the 2001 Assembly election. In 2001, He polled 61,936 votes and defeated his nearest rival Dulal Chandra Bar of the All India Trinamool Congress, by a margin of 237 votes.

== Death ==
He died on 3 September 2025 due to age-related health issues.
