= Saugata Roy =

Indian politician (born 1947)

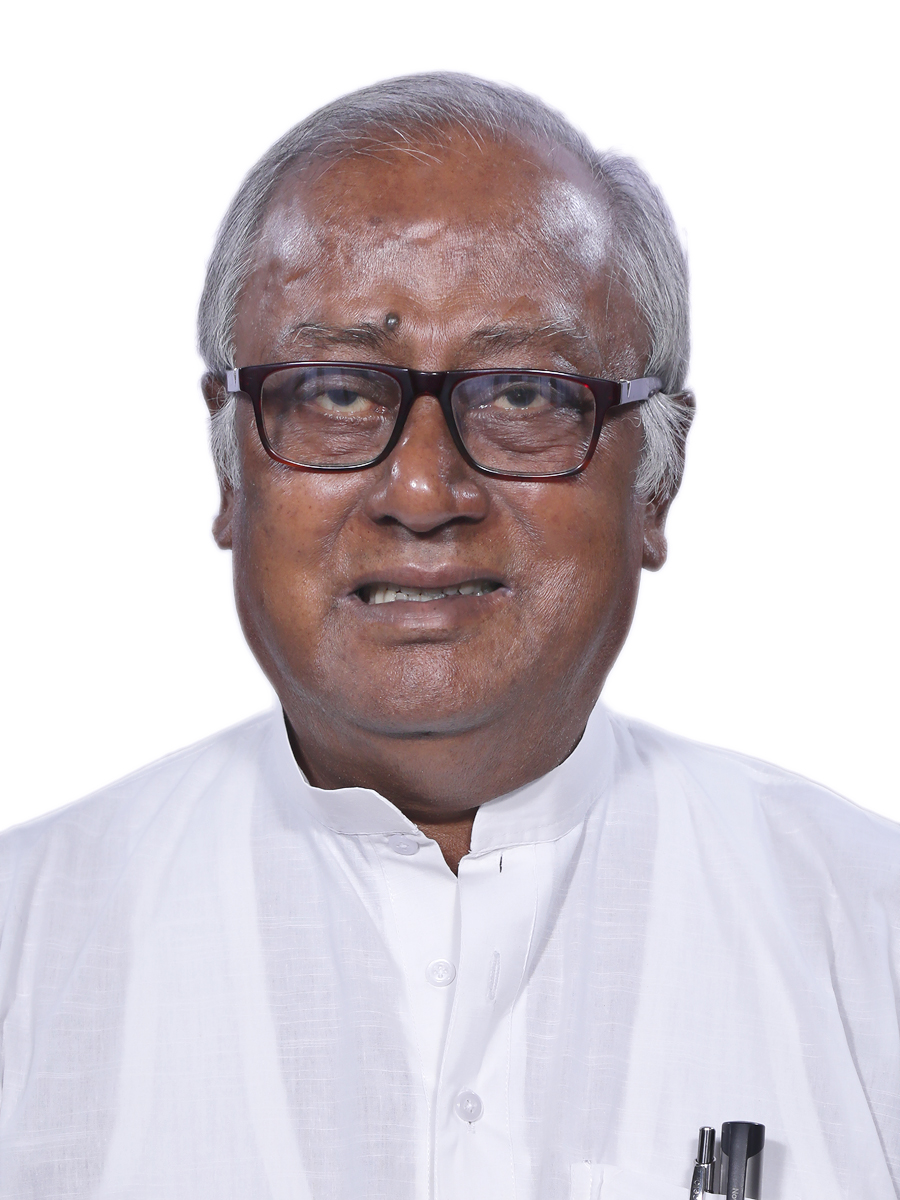
- Official portrait, 2024

Member of Parliament, Lok Sabha
- Incumbent
- Assumed office 16 May 2009
- Preceded by: Amitava Nandy
- Constituency: Dum Dum, West Bengal
- In office 23 March 1977 – 14 January 1980
- Preceded by: Mohammad Ismail
- Succeeded by: Mohammad Ismail
- Constituency: Barrackpore, West Bengal

Union Minister of State for Urban Development
- In office 22 May 2009 – 22 September 2012
- Prime Minister: Manmohan Singh
- Minister: Jaipal Reddy; Kamal Nath
- Preceded by: Ajay Maken
- Succeeded by: Deepa Dasmunsi

Union Minister of State for Petroleum, Chemicals and Fertilizers
- In office 28 July 1979 – 14 January 1980
- Prime Minister: Chaudhary Charan Singh

Member of West Bengal Legislative Assembly
- In office 1987 – 13 May 2001
- Preceded by: Anup Kumar Chandra
- Succeeded by: Tapas Paul
- Constituency: Alipore
- In office 13 May 2001 – 11 May 2006
- Preceded by: Kshiti Goswami
- Succeeded by: Kshiti Goswami
- Constituency: Dhakuria
- In office 11 May 2006 – 16 May 2009
- Preceded by: Bhupendranath Seth
- Succeeded by: Gopal Seth
- Constituency: Bangaon Dakshin

Personal details
- Born: 6 August 1947 (age 79) Shillong, Assam Province, British India (present-day Meghalaya, India)
- Party: All India Trinamool Congress (since 2001)
- Other political affiliations: Indian National Congress (until 2001)
- Spouse: Dolly Roy
- Relatives: Tathagata Roy (brother)
- Education: University of Calcutta (MSc, LLB)
- Profession: Academician
- As of 11 September, 2009 Source: []

Saugata Roy (born 6 August 1947) is an Indian politician of Trinamool Congress and a Member of the Indian Parliament representing the Dum Dum constituency in the 16th Lok Sabha. He has also served as Union Minister of State for Urban Development in the Manmohan Singh government.

== Political career ==
A veteran politician from West Bengal, senior leader of Trinamool Congress, he was elected to the 15th Lok Sabha from the Dum Dum constituency and re-elected to the 16th Lok Sabha from the same constituency. He had earlier been elected from Barrackpore (Lok Sabha constituency) in 1977. He was briefly the Union Minister of State for Petroleum in the Charan Singh Ministry and was the Union Minister of State for Urban Development in the UPA II Ministry from 2009 to 2012. He has been elected to the West Bengal State Legislative Assembly five times having been elected from Alipore (3 Terms), Dhakuria and Bangaon constituencies.

=== 2026 MPs Rebellion ===
Following the 2026 Assembly Elections, 20 out of the 28 Members of Parliament from Trinamool Congress decided to leave Mamata Banerjee and the Trinamool Congress. They formed a new group and decided to merge with a relatively little known National Party, the Nationalist Citizen Party of India and presented a representation in this regards to Lok Sabha Speaker Om Birla on 14 June 2026.

After this major split in the Trinamool Congress, only 8 Lok Sabha MPs remained loyal to Mamata Banerjee. The loyalist MPs included Abhishek Banerjee, Mahua Moitra, Saugata Roy, Kalyan Banerjee, Kirti Azad, Pratima Mondal and Sajda Ahmed.

The event is still unfolding.

== Controversies ==
On 11 January 2017, the then Bharatiya Janata Party MP Babul Supriyo filed a complaint against Roy along with TMC MP Tapas Paul and MLA Mahua Moitra for falsely accusing him of being involved in the Rose Valley ponzi firm scam.

== Personal life ==
A National Science Talent Search Scholar and a former student of St. Lawrence High School, Kolkata, Jogesh Chandra Chaudhuri Law College and Presidency College, Kolkata, he holds a post-graduate degree in Physics. He also holds a degree in law from Calcutta University. He is a retired professor of Physics from Asutosh College. He is married to Dolly Roy. His brother Tathagata is a politician from the BJP.

== Positions held ==
Period	Position
26-Sep-2024 onwards	Member, Committee on Finance
14-Aug-2024 onwards	Member, Committee on Public Accounts
June 2024	Elected to 18th Lok Sabha
	Member, Consultative Committee, Ministry of Defence
13-Sept-2019 onwards	Member, Standing Committee on Finance
24-July-2019 onwards	Member, Committee on Public Undertakings
May 2019	Re-elected to 17th Lok Sabha (4th term)
1-May-2017 to 25-May-2019	Member, Committee on Public Undertakings
29-April-2015 to 25-May-2019	Member, Joint Committee on Security in Parliament House Complex
11-Dec-2014 to 25-May-2019	Member, Joint Committee on Offices of Profit
	Member, Consultative Committee, Ministry of Defence
	Member, Standing Committee on Finance
1-Sep-2014 to 25-May-2019	Member, Rules Committee
14-Aug-2014 to 30-April-2016	Member, Committee on Public Undertakings
May 2014	Re-elected to 16th Lok Sabha (3rd term)
2009 to 22-Sept-2012	Union Minister of State, Urban Development
2009	Re-elected to 15th Lok Sabha (2nd term), from Dum Dum
1987 to 2009	Member, West Bengal Legislative Assembly (five terms)
1979	Union Minister of State for Petroleum and Chemicals
	Member, Committee on Government Assurances
1977	Elected to 6th Lok Sabha, from Barrackpore
1973 to 1977	General Secretary, West Bengal Pradesh Congress Committee
1968 to 1970	General Secretary, West Bengal Chhatra Parishad, Students Wing of the Congress
