= Ashok Krishna Dutt =

Indian politician (born 1928)

Asoke Krishna Dutt

Member of Parliament, Lok Sabha
- In office 1977–1980
- Preceded by: Constituency created
- Succeeded by: Niren Ghosh
- Constituency: Dum Dum, West Bengal

Member, West Bengal Legislative Assembly
- In office 1962–1967
- Preceded by: Chitta Basu
- Succeeded by: H.K.Basu
- Constituency: Barasat constituency

Personal details
- Born: 21 November 1928 Calcutta, Bengal Presidency, British India
- Party: Janata Party
- Other political affiliations: Indian National Congress
- Spouse: Mira Dutt
- Children: 1 son and daughter

Ashok Krishna Dutt (born 21 November 1928) was an Indian politician. He was elected to the Lok Sabha, lower house of the Parliament of India from Dum Dum in 1977 defeating Communist leader Indrajit Gupta. He was a Solicitor and Advocate and practiced in the Calcutta High Court. He was arrested under Maintenance of Internal Security Act during Emergency. He was elected to the West Bengal legislative assembly from Barasat constituency in 1962 defeating Forward Bloc leader Chitta Basu.
