= Swapan Majumder =

Indian politician

Swapan Majumdar

Member of the West Bengal Legislative Assembly
- Incumbent
- Assumed office 2 May 2021
- Preceded by: Surajit Kumar Biswas
- Constituency: Bangaon Dakshin

Personal details
- Born: 19 April 1982 (age 44)
- Party: Bharatiya Janata Party
- Education: 12th
- Profession: Business

Swapan Majumdar (born 1982) is an Indian politician from West Bengal. He was elected as a member of the West Bengal Legislative Assembly from the Bangaon South Assembly Constituency in North 24 Paraganas district in 2021.

== Early life and education ==
Majumdar is from 96 Bangaon. He completed Class 8 at Mondalpara High School in 1996.

== Career ==
Majumdar won Bongaon seat representing Bharatiya Janata Party in the 2021 West Bengal Legislative Assembly election defeating Alo Rani Sarkar of All India Trinamool Congress by a margin of 2,004 votes. He is nominated by BJP, to contest the Barasat Lok Sabha constituency in the 2024 Indian General Election in West Bengal. He was allegedly involved in a smuggling racket and was arrested in 2017. He denied the allegations and said that he was framed by the police.
