= Bagda Assembly constituency =

West Bengal Legislative Assembly constituency

Bagda
- Constituency No. 94 for the West Bengal Legislative Assembly
- Interactive Map Outlining Bagda Assembly Constituency

Constituency details
- Country: India
- Region: East India
- State: West Bengal
- District: North 24 Parganas
- Lok Sabha constituency: Bangaon
- Established: 1962
- Total electors: 277,464
- Reservation: SC

Member of Legislative Assembly
- 18th West Bengal Legislative Assembly
- Incumbent Soma Thakur
- Party: BJP
- Alliance: NDA
- Elected year: 2026

Winners of this Assembly Constituency since its establishment
1. AIFB(6 times) (35.3%)
2. Indian National Congress (4 times) (23.6%)
3. Trinamool Congress(3 times) (17.6%)
4. Independent candidate(2 times) (11.8%)
5. BJP(2 times) (11.8%)

Bagda is an assembly constituency in North 24 Parganas district in the Indian state of West Bengal. It is reserved for scheduled castes.

== Overview ==
As per orders of the Delimitation Commission, No. 94 Bagdah Assembly constituency (SC) is composed of the following: Bagdah community development block and Gangrapota, Sundarpur and Tengra gram panchayats of Bangaon community development block.

Bagdah Assembly constituency (SC) is part of No. 14 Bangaon (Lok Sabha constituency) (SC). It was earlier part of Barasat (Lok Sabha constituency).

== Members of the Legislative Assembly ==
Year	Name	Party
1962	Manindra Bhusan Biswas	Indian National Congress
1967	Apurba Lal Majumdar	All India Forward Bloc
1969	Apurba Lal Majumdar	All India Forward Bloc
1971	Apurba Lal Majumdar	All India Forward Bloc
1972	Apurba Lal Majumdar	All India Forward Bloc
1977	Kamalakshi Biswas	All India Forward Bloc
1982	Kamalakshi Biswas	All India Forward Bloc
1987	Apurba Lal Majumdar	Indian National Congress
1991	Kamalakshi Biswas	All India Forward Bloc
1996	Kamalakshi Biswas	All India Forward Bloc
2001	Kamalakshi Biswas	All India Forward Bloc
2006	Dulal Bar	All India Trinamool Congress
2011	Upendranath Biswas	All India Trinamool Congress
2016	Dulal Bar	Indian National Congress
2021^^	Biswajit Das	Bharatiya Janata Party
2024^	Madhuparna Thakur	All India Trinamool Congress
2026	Soma Thakur	Bharatiya Janata Party

- ^ by-election
- ^^Biswajit Das switched from BJP to TMC after 2021 election

== Election results ==
=== 2026 ===
2026 West Bengal Legislative Assembly election: Bagdah
Party	Candidate	Votes	%	±%
BJP	Soma Thakur	121,307	55.84	▲6.43
AITC	Madhuparna Thakur	86,691	39.91	▼5.03
AIFB	Gour Biswas	4,700	2.16	
NOTA	None of the above	718	0.33	▼0.14
Majority		34,616	15.93	▲11.46
Turnout		217,223	89.89	▲11.04
BJP gain from AITC		Swing		

=== 2024 bypoll ===
2024 West Bengal Legislative Assembly by-election: Bagdah
Party	Candidate	Votes	%	±%
AITC	Madhuparna Thakur	107,706	55.04	▲10.1
BJP	Binay Kumar Biswas	74,251	37.95	▼11.46
AIFB	Gouradipta Biswas	8,189	4.89	New
INC	Ashoke Kumar Haldar	1,297	0.66	▼3.11
NOTA	None of the above	667	0.34	▼0.13
Majority		33,455	17.09	
Turnout		231,240		
AITC gain from BJP		Swing		

=== 2021 ===
In the 2021 election, Biswajit Das of Bharatiya Janata Party (BJP) defeated his nearest rival Paritosh Kumar Saha of All India Trinamool Congress (AITC). He later switched parties to AITC.

West Bengal assembly elections, 2021: Bagdah (SC) constituency
Party	Candidate	Votes	%	±%
BJP	Biswajit Das	108,111	49.41	
AITC	Paritosh Kumar Saha	98,319	44.94	
INC	Prabir Kirtonia (Bapi)	8,250	3.77	
BSP	Santosh Biswas	2,240	1.02	
NOTA	None of the above	1,020	0.47	
Majority		9,792	4.47	
Turnout		218,791	78.85	
BJP gain from INC		Swing		

=== 2016 ===
In the 2016 election, Dulal Bar of Indian National Congress (INC) defeated his nearest rival Upendra Nath Biswas of AITC.

West Bengal assembly elections, 2016: Bagdah (SC) constituency
Party	Candidate	Votes	%	±%
INC	Dulal Bar	102,026	49.64	
AITC	Upendranath Biswas	89,790	43.68	
BSP	Bikash Biswas	1,532	0.75	
BJP	Biva Majumder	8,987	4.38	
NOTA	None of the above	1,324	0.64	
Independent	Harish Chandra Mondal	792	0.39	
Guru Chand Mukti Morcha	Hirak Golder	581	0.28	
RPI(A)	Gautam Malo	498	0.24	
Turnout		205,546	79.63	
INC gain from AITC		Swing		

=== 2011 ===
West Bengal assembly elections, 2011: Bagdah (SC) constituency
Party	Candidate	Votes	%	±%
AITC	Upendranath Biswas	91,821	52.91	+1.57#
AIFB	Mrinalkanti Sikdar	70,865	40.84	−9.93
BSP	Chandan Mallick	4,414	2.54	
BJP	Arabinda Biswas	4,306	2.48	
Independent	Pranita Mandal	1,212		
Nirjatita Samaj Biplabi Party	Dhirendra Nath Mandal	913		
AITC hold		Swing		
Turnout		173,531	85.57	11.40#

.# Swing calculated on Congress+Trinamool Congress vote percentages taken together in 2006.

=== 2006 ===
Contests in most years were multi cornered but only winners and runners are being mentioned. Kamalakshmi Biswas of Forward Bloc defeated Dulal Chandra Bar of Trinamool Congress in 2001, Kalidas Adhikari of Congress in 1996, and Ram Chandra Bose of Congress in 1991. Apurba Lal Majumdar of Congress defeated Kamalakshi Biswas of Forward Bloc in 1987. Kamalakshmi Biswas of Forward Bloc defeated Apurba Lal Majumdar of Congress in 1982 and Independent in 1977.

=== 2001 ===
West Bengal assembly elections, 2001
Party	Candidate	Votes	%	±%
AIFB	Kamalakshi Biswas	61936		
AITC	Dulal Chandra Bar	61699		
BJP	Arabinda Biswas	8288		
BSP	Chandan Mallick	1715		
Turnout		135666		
AIFB hold		Swing	{{{swing}}}	

=== 1972 ===
Apurba Lal Majumdar of Forward Bloc won in 1972, 1971, 1969 and 1967. Manindra Bhusan Biswas of Congress won in 1962. Prior to that the Bagdah seat did not exist.
