= Apurbalal Majumdar =

Indian politician (1925–2001)

Apurbalal Majumdar (1925–2001) was an Indian politician. Initially a member of the Scheduled Castes Federation, he was later associated with the All India Forward Bloc. In the 1950s he emerged as a leader of Namasudra refugees from East Bengal. He was elected to the West Bengal Legislative Assembly seven times. He served as Deputy Speaker of the West Bengal Legislative Assembly 1969–1970 and as its Speaker 1971–1977. He later became a leader of the Indian National Congress(I).

== Youth ==
Majumdar was born in Brahmaganj (Faridpur District) in 1925, son of Raimohan Majumdar. He belonged to the Namasudra community. Majumdar went to school at the Barisal Zilla School, then studied at P.C. College in Bagerhat, the Krishnagar Government College and the University Law College. He obtained M.A. degree in economics and a LL.B. (Law degree) from the University of Calcutta.

Majumdar began his political career as a follower of B.R. Ambedkar and a disciple of Jogendranath Mondal, the leader of the Scheduled Castes Federation in Bengal. Between 1945 and 1948 Majumdar was the president of the Bengal Scheduled Castes Students Federation, and between 1945 and 1946 he was the vice president of the All India Scheduled Castes Students Federation. In 1946 he became the editor of the weekly Jagaran. He would go on to become an advocate (lawyer) at the Calcutta High Court. In 1951 Majumdar became the president of the Progressive Backward People's Association.

== 1957 Bettiah satyagrah ==
Majumdar rose to prominence during the struggle of East Bengal refugees of the Bettiah camp in Champaran District of Bihar in 1957. In response to the appalling conditions at the Bettiah camp thousands of refugees deserted the camp and arrived in Howrah and Calcutta (estimates vary from 7,000 to 15,000). The majority installed themselves as squatters at Howrah Maidan whilst a smaller section squatted the platforms of the Sealdah railway station. Conditions among the Bettiah refugees were very difficult, on average six people died every day. The United Central Refugee Council, linked to the left-wing parties, sought to mobilize the refugees. An Action Committee was formed. Majumdar did not have influence in the Calcutta-based refugee organisations but the refugees who trusted him as he was a Namasudra himself. Some 90% of the refugees at Howrah Maidan and Sealdah station were Namasudras, and it was Majumdar who emerged as their leader. Per Prafulla K. Chakrabarti (1990) Majumdar was "virtually a one-man group. He had enormous influence over the Bettiah refugees".

In the Action Committee formed for the struggle of the Bettiah refugees there were different viewpoints regarding the tactics to be employed in the protest movement, Majumdar favoured a gradual escalation of protests. Majumdar had near total control over the refugees at Howrah Maidan. Prankrishna Chakrabarti attempted to mobilize the refugees at Sealdah station and bring them into the UCRC fold, a move that Majumdar resisted.

On 17 April 1957, some of the leftist leaders met the West Bengal Chief Minister Bidhan Chandra Roy in a deputation to demand rehabilitation of the Bettiah deserters. Roy did not agree to the demands. On 27 April 1957, the leftist leaders held a press conference, announcing the Action Committee for a protest movement in favour of the rehabilitation of the Bettiah deserters. The Action Committee was chaired by All India Forward Bloc leader Hemanta Basu. Other members included Suresh Chandra Banerjee (Praja Socialist Party), Jibonlal Chatterjee (Democratic Vanguard) and Apurbalal Majumdar Majumdar represented the Namasudras on the Action Committee. A satyagrah protest movement was initiated at Subodh Mullick Square on 4 May 1957, calling on the national government in Delhi to intervene.

In the midst of the Bettiah satyagrah protest movement the 1957 West Bengal Legislative Assembly election took place. Majumdar was elected to the West Bengal Legislative Assembly, standing as an All India Forward Bloc candidate. He contested the seat reserved for Scheduled Castes in the Sankrail constituency. Majumdar won the seat, obtaining 33,498 votes (59.79% of the votes cast for Scheduled Caste candidates in the constituency).

The Bettiah Satyagrah protest movement lasted for about a month. Majumdar negotiated a deal with the government, whereby the refugees would return to the Bettiah camp if paid two months arrear cash dole immediately, living conditions at the camp improved and arrangements for economic rehabilitation put in place. The protest movement was formally withdrawn on 6 June 1957, and the refugees began returning to Bettiah camp.

== Legislator ==
Majumdar won the Panchla Assembly constituency in the 1962 West Bengal Legislative Assembly election, obtaining 17,886 votes (48.33%).

Majumdar contested both the Uluberia North and Bagdah seats in the 1967 West Bengal Legislative Assembly election, winning both. In Bagdah Majumdar obtained 32,263 votes (71.08%). In Uluberia North he obtained 19,812 votes (36.35%). On 8 March 1967, Majumdar resigned from the Uluberia North seat, prompting a bye-election to be held in order to fill the seat. The by-election was won by All India Forward Bloc candidate K. Mondal.

Ahead of the 1969 West Bengal Legislative Assembly election Majumdar's former political mentor Jogendranath Mondal entered in the fray to contest Majumdar's Bagdah seat. Mondal was starting his campaign early, in September 1968. Mondal was setting an office of his Republican Party of India in the area. The situation in the constituency became tense, and reportedly Mondal received death threats from the Majumdar camp. A few days after having reportedly received death threats, Mondal died. It was rumoured that workers of the Majumdar had forced Mondal to drink tea with them at Bongaon, and that he had been poisoned. Majumdar retained the Bagdah seat in the 1969 election, obtaining 23,885 votes (53.06%). Majumdar was the Deputy Speaker of the West Bengal Legislative Assembly during the period of 1969–1970, having been elected by the Legislative Assembly to the post on 6 March 1969.

== Forward Bloc leader ==
In 1969 he became the secretary of the West Bengal State Committee of the All India Forward Bloc. He was also a member of the executive committee of the party. He was the vice president of the All India Youth League, and the convenor of the AIYL in West Bengal. In 1968 Majumdar represented Indian youth at the 9th World Festival of Youth and Students, held in the Bulgarian capital Sofia.

Majumdar was active in several social and political organizations. He served as the president of various trade unions, such as the Howrah District Engineering and Metal Workers' Union, the Gobardhan Das P.A. Workers' Union, the Ajanta Steel ( P. ) Ltd. Employees Union, the Indian Supercraft Industries Employees Union, the Sree Annapurna Dying Workers' Union, the Paul's Engineering Workers' Union, the Bharat Mineral Industries Workers' Union, the Associated Synthetic Industries Employees' Union and the Galamal Association in Howrah. In 1970 he became the president of the Sara Bangla Agragami Kisan Sabha - the West Bengal unit of the peasants front of the All India Forward Bloc, as well as becoming the chairman of the Central Refugee Council and St. John's Ambulance. Majumdar was the Deputy Speaker of the West Bengal Legislative Assembly 1969–1970. In 1971 he became the founding secretary of the Netaji Vidyayatan in Howrah, the Indo-Bangladesh Saranarthi and the Mukti Sangram Sahayak Samiti. He edited the monthly Patheya. In 1971 he became the president of the West Bengal Fishermen Association. He took part in the 19th Commonwealth Parliamentary Conference held in Malaysia in 1971.

== Speaker ==
Majumdar again retained the Bagdah seat in the 1971 West Bengal Legislative Assembly election, obtaining 19,851 votes (48.89%). On 3 May 1971, Majumdar was elected Speaker of the West Bengal Legislative Assembly. He obtained 140 votes in the election of Speaker, against 132 votes cast for Benoy Choudhury of the Communist Party of India (Marxist).

Ahead of the 1972 West Bengal Legislative Assembly election there were differences within the All India Forward Bloc leadership in West Bengal on which alliances the party should seek. The Congress(R)-CPI front Progressive Democratic Alliance invited the party to join their seat-sharing arrangement, but in the end the All India Forward Bloc decided to enter a seat-sharing arrangement with the CPI(M)-led front. In protest, in February 1972 Majumdar resigned from the party and would contest the Bagdah seat in the 1972 election as an independent candidate. The Congress(R) decided not to field any candidate in Bagdah, thus indirectly supporting Majumdar's candidacy. Majumdar was declared winner of the Bagdah seat, having obtained 24,769 votes (63.32%) per official records.

Majumdar was unanimously re-elected as the Speaker of the West Bengal Legislative Assembly after the 1972 election, at its inaugural session on 24 March 1972.

He became the president of the West Bengal Adibasi Seva Sangha in 1972, president of the Manabik Adhikar Sanrakshan Samiti in 1973, president of the governing body of the Dinabandhu Mahavidyalay in Bongaon in 1973 and president of the Medico-Psychological Research Society in Calcutta in 1974. He served as the president of the West Bengal branch of the Commonwealth Parliamentary Association.

Majumdar lost the Bagdah seat in the 1977 West Bengal Legislative Assembly election, standing as an independent candidate. He finished in second place with 24,966 votes (44.70%), losing the seat to the All India Forward Bloc candidate Kamalakshi Biswas.

== Congress(I) politician ==
Majumdar later joined the Congress Party. As of the 1980s, Majumdar was part of the Executive of the West Bengal Pradesh Congress Committee (I), becoming one of its vice presidents in August 1981.

He tried to regain the Bagdah seat in the 1982 West Bengal Legislative Assembly election standing as a Congress(I) candidate, again finishing in second place behind Biswas with 40,070 votes (48.53%). Majumdar contested the Nabadwip parliamentary seat in the 1984 Indian general election, coming in second place with 334,536 votes (48.99%).

Majumdar made a come-back to the West Bengal Legislative Assembly in the 1987 election, winning the Bagdah seat and obtaining 44,517 votes (49.16%).

He contested the Nabadwip parliamentary seat again in the 1991 Indian general election, finishing in second place with 351,797 votes (39.24%). Majumdar did not contest the 1991 West Bengal Legislative Assembly election.

== Later years ==
Majumdar would break ties with the Congress Party due to conflict with other leaders in the party. He stood as the All India Indira Congress (Tiwari) candidate in the Uluberia North seat in the 1996 West Bengal Legislative Assembly election, merely obtaining 865 votes (0.69%). Reportedly he later joined the Trinamool Congress instead. Soon thereafter he retired from political activities due to health concerns. Majumdar died on 23 January 2001, at SSKM Hospital in Calcutta, following a cerebral attack and renal failure.
