= Subhasish Chakraborty =

Indian politician

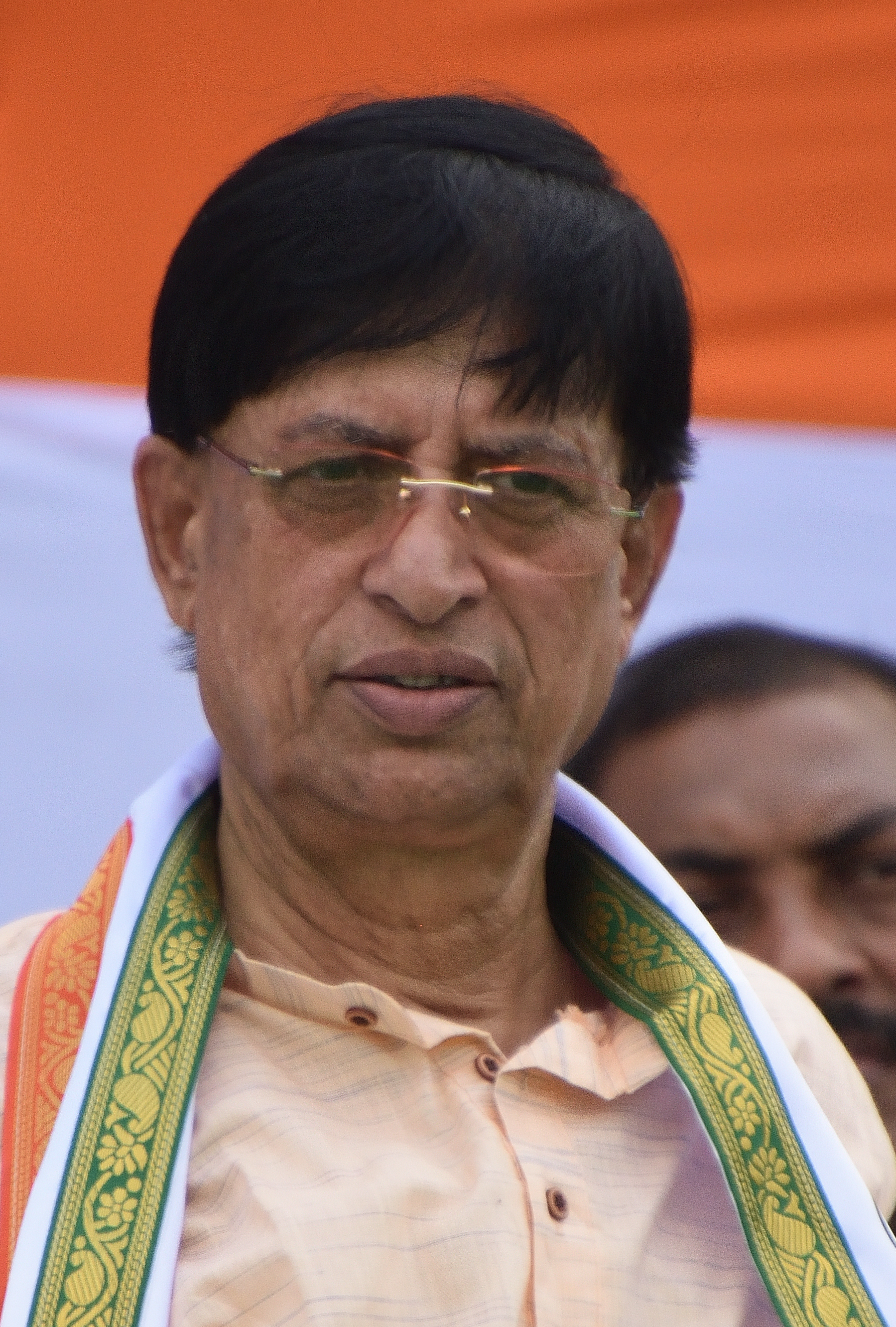

Member of Parliament, Rajya Sabha
- In office 3 April 2018 – 2 April 2024
- Succeeded by: Mamata Bala Thakur
- Constituency: West Bengal

Personal details
- Born: 21 December 1957 (age 68) Kolkata, West Bengal, India
- Party: All India Trinamool Congress (1998–present)
- Other political affiliations: Indian National Congress (until 1997)
- Spouse: Soma Chakraborty (Councillor at KMC)
- Children: Santanu Chakraborty
- Education: University of Calcutta
- Profession: Advocate

Subhasish Chakraborty is an Indian politician, served in the Rajya Sabha.
