= Upendra Nath Biswas =

Indian politician and retired Police officer

Minister for Backward Class Welfare, Government of West Bengal
- In office 2011–2016
- Governor: M. K. Narayanan
- Succeeded by: Rajib Banerjee

Member of Legislative Assembly of West Bengal
- In office 2011–2016
- Governor: M. K. Narayanan
- Preceded by: Dulal Bar (AITC)
- Succeeded by: Dulal Bar (INC)
- Constituency: Bagda

Personal details
- Born: 12 August 1941 (age 85) Jessore, Bangladesh
- Party: AITC(2011-2021)
- Education: University of Calcutta
- Profession: Politician and Civil Servant

Upendranath Biswas or U. N. Biswas is a retired Indian Police Service (IPS) officer, caste historian, and an Indian politician. He is widely known for his probe into the Fodder Scam and for bringing down the once-powerful RJD leader and Bihar Chief Minister Lalu Prasad Yadav in 1997.

He also served as the Minister of Backward Classes Welfare in the Government of West Bengal from 2011 to 2016 in the First Banerjee ministry. He resigned from Trinamool Congress in 2021.

== Early life ==
He was born to Nibaran Chandra Biswas at faridpur resent, vill ulpur, upazila Gopalganj, Jilla Gopalganj in Bangladesh. He belongs to Namasudra family and follows Ambedkarite ideology. He completed his Ph.D. in sociology from the University of Calcutta in 1986. He converted to Buddhism and is one of the few lawmakers from West Bengal who belongs to the religion.

== As a civil servant ==
He joined the West Bengal Police as an IPS officer in 1968, serving as a DSP in charge of an EFR company, the head of a subdivision, Additional SP at the district headquarters, SP of West Dinajpur, SSP in the West Bengal CID, and Joint Director of the CBI. During his tenure at the CBI, his honest investigation report submitted to the court was replaced with one written by his deputy, Ranjit Sinha, by the CBI Director, Joginder Singh, to please the political establishment, for which the CBI received strictures from the court.

He retired as the additional director of India's Central Bureau of Investigation (CBI), which he served as an officer of the Indian Police Service (West Bengal cadre, 1968 batch). He first became a news-maker by relentlessly pursuing former Chief Ministers of Bihar, Jagannath Mishra and Lalu Prasad Yadav in the ₹950 crore (US$99 million) Fodder scam as the joint Director (East), CBI.

He was involved in detecting and resolving many scams when he held the Office of the Joint Director, Central Bureau of Investigation (CBI). The most popular of these was perhaps the scam for Chara Ghotala in which he caught the corrupt politician Lalu Prasad Yadav and sent him to jail also. Even after threats to his life from different politicians, he did his duties perfectly up to the end.

In 2002, he had retired from the CBI as Additional director.

== Politics ==
After retirement from his job, he joined the All India Trinamool Congress party and won from Bagda in Bongaon subdivision. He was an MLA, elected from the Bagda constituency in the 2011 West Bengal state assembly election. He has served as the Minister for Backward Class Welfare in the Government of West Bengal from 2011 to 2016. During the 2021 West Bengal election, he resigned from Trinamool Congress.

== Whistleblowing ==
In 2022, in a Facebook post, he first exposed the School Service Commission (SSC) TET scam in West Bengal.

== Controversy ==
He created a controversy by seeking the help of the Indian Army in rushing to arrest Lalu Prasad Yadav, following which he was harassed by his department and the political establishment.

State Legislative Assembly
Preceded by Dulal Chandra Bar (AITC)	Member of the West Bengal Legislative Assembly from Bagdah Assembly constituency 2011 – 2016	Succeeded by Dulal Chandra Bar (INC)
