= Asutosh Law =

Indian politician

Asutosh Laha
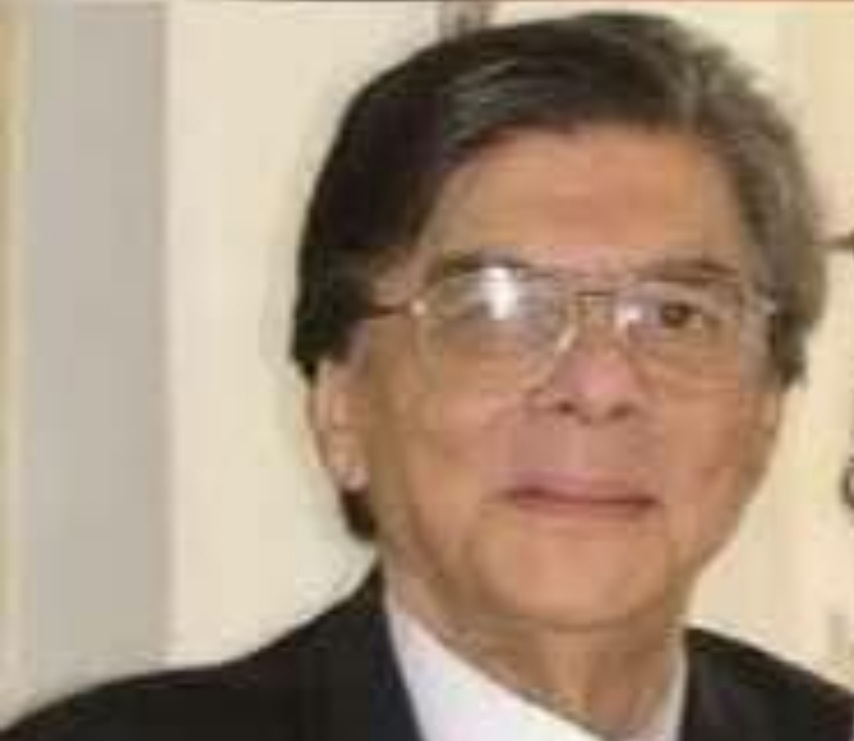
- Asutosh Laha, former Member of Parliament & distinguished lawyer (2010)

Member of Parliament, Lok Sabha
- In office 1984-1989
- Preceded by: Niren Ghosh
- Succeeded by: Nirmal Kanti Chatterjee
- Constituency: Dum Dum, West Bengal

Personal details
- Born: 10 October 1940 Calcutta, Bengal Presidency, British India
- Died: 20 October 2013 (aged 73)
- Party: Indian National Congress
- Spouse: Mitali Laha
- Children: 2 daughters

Asutosh Laha was an Indian politician and Lawyer. He was elected to the Lok Sabha, lower house of the Parliament of India from Dum Dum in 1984. He was a student of St. Xavier's College, Kolkata and later studied law in University College of Law, Calcutta.

Asutosh Law also served as the chairman of the Parliamentary Estimates Committee and a director of Allahabad Bank.
