= Gobinda Chandra Naskar =

Indian politician (1941–2022)

Member of West Bengal Legislative Assembly
- In office 2017–2021
- Preceded by: Subhas Naskar
- Constituency: Basanti

Member of Parliament, Lok Sabha
- In office 2009–2014
- Preceded by: New constituency
- Succeeded by: Kapil Krishna Thakur
- Constituency: Bangaon, West Bengal

Member of West Bengal Legislative Assembly
- In office 1971–1977
- Preceded by: Narayan Naskar
- Succeeded by: Abdur Razzak Molla
- Constituency: Canning Purba

Personal details
- Born: 16 June 1941 Gourdaha, West Bengal, India
- Died: 2 September 2022 (aged 81) Kolkata, West Bengal, India
- Party: Trinamool Congress; Indian National Congress
- Education: Jadavpur University, Kolkata
- Profession: Politician

Gobinda Chandra Naskar was a member of the 15th Lok Sabha. He was elected as a Trinamool Congress candidate from Bangaon. He was also member of West Bengal Legislative Assembly in 4 different terms. He was also chief of Trinamool Congress OBC Cell. He was the member of legislative assembly of West Bengal elected from Basanti constituency in 2016.

Pratima Mondal, his daughter, has been elected to the 16th Lok Sabha from Jaynagar.
