= Amitava Nandy =

Indian politician

Member of parliament, Lok Sabha
- In office 2004–2009
- Preceded by: Tapan Sikdar
- Succeeded by: Saugata Roy
- Constituency: Dum Dum, West Bengal

Personal details
- Born: 12 March 1943
- Died: 15 August 2014 (aged 71)
- Party: Communist Party of India (Marxist)
- Education: Surendranath College
- Profession: Politician

Amitava Nandy (12 March 1943 – 15 August 2014) was a member of the 14th Lok Sabha of India. He represented the Dum Dum constituency of West Bengal and was a member of the Communist Party of India (Marxist) (CPI(M)) political party. He had been one of the most successful MPs during his tenure.

Nandy used to take initiatives in commemorating the 'Amar Ekushe February'(the Immortal 21 February) every year, endeavouring to promote cultural oneness between the two 'Bengals' which had once been partitioned as a result of a political conspiracy. He died of cancer in 2014.

His wife Ila Nandy is an ex-councillor of Bidhannagar Municipality.
