= Bangaon Lok Sabha constituency =

Lok Sabha constituency in West Bengal

Coordinates: 23°04′N 88°49′E

Bangaon WB-14
- Lok Sabha constituency
- Interactive Map Outlining Bangaon Lok Sabha Constituency

Constituency details
- Country: India
- Region: East India
- State: West Bengal
- Assembly constituencies: Kalyani; Haringhata; Bagda; Bangaon Uttar; Bangaon Dakshin; Gaighata; Swarupnagar
- Established: 2009
- Total electors: 1,540,713
- Reservation: SC

Member of Parliament
- 18th Lok Sabha
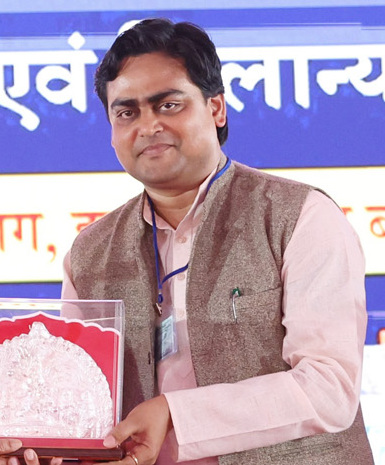
- Incumbent Shantanu Thakur
- Party: BJP
- Alliance: NDA
- Elected year: 2024

Party-wise wins in Bangaon Lok Sabha constituency
1. All India Trinamool Congress (3) (60.0%)
2. Bharatiya Janata Party (2) (40.0%)

Bangaon Lok Sabha constituency or Bongaon Lok Sabha constituency is one of the 543 parliamentary constituencies in India. The constituency is in North 24 Parganas district in West Bengal and is centered on Bangaon. 5 of the 7 assembly segments of No.14 Bangaon Lok Sabha constituency are in North 24 Parganas district and the Kalyani and Haringhata assemblies are of Nadia District (formerly Nabadwip loksabha constituency). As per order of the Delimitation Commission in respect of the delimitation of constituencies in the West Bengal, Bangaon Lok Sabha constituency came into being in 2009.

== History ==
Parliamentary constituencies in West Bengal - 1. Cooch Behar, 2. Alipurduars, 3. Jalpaiguri, 4. Darjeeling, 5. Raiganj, 6. Balurghat, 7. Maldaha Uttar, 8. Maldaha Dakshin, 9. Jangipur, 10. Baharampur, 11. Murshidabad, 12. Krishnanagar, 13. Ranaghat, 14. Bangaon, 15. Barrackpore, 16. Dum Dum, 17. Barasat, 18. Basirhat, 19. Jaynagar, 20. Mathurapur, 21. Diamond Harbour, 22. Jadavpur, 23. Kolkata Dakshin, 24. Kolkata Uttar, 25. Howrah, 26. Uluberia, 27. Serampore, 28. Hooghly, 29. Arambagh, 30. Tamluk, 31, Kanthi, 32. Ghatal, 33. Jhargram, 34. Medinipur, 35. Purulia, 36. Bankura, 37. Bishnupur, 38. Bardhaman Purba, 39. Bardhaman Durgapur, 40. Asansol, 41. Bolpur, 42. Birbhum

In 2009 Bangaon Lok Sabha constituency was formed. Until then Bagdah, Bongaon Uttar, Bongaon Dakshin, Gaighata all these assembly constituencies were the part of Barasat Lok Sabha constituency. Gobinda Chandra Naskar was the first elected MP of this constituency. He was also a member of West Bengal Legislative Assembly in four different terms.

== Assembly segments ==
Bangaon (SC) Lok Sabha constituency (parliamentary constituency no. 14) is composed of the following assembly segments

#	Name	District	Member	Party	2024 Lead
92	Kalyani (SC)	Nadia	Anupam Biswas	BJP	BJP
93	Haringhata (SC)	Nadia	Ashim Kumar Sarkar	BJP	BJP
94	Bagdah (SC)	North 24 Parganas	Soma Thakur	BJP	BJP
95	Bangaon Uttar (SC)	North 24 Parganas	Ashok Kirtania	BJP	BJP
96	Bangaon Dakshin (SC)	North 24 Parganas	Swapan Majumder	BJP	BJP
97	Gaighata (SC)	North 24 Parganas	Subrata Thakur	BJP	BJP
98	Swarupnagar (SC)	North 24 Parganas	Bina Mondal	AITC	AITC

== Members of Parliament ==
Year	Member	Party
Till 2009 : Was a part of Barasat Lok Sabha constituency
2009	Gobinda Chandra Naskar	Trinamool Congress
2014	Kapil Krishna Thakur	Trinamool Congress
2015^	Mamata Bala Thakur	Trinamool Congress
2019	Shantanu Thakur	Bharatiya Janata Party
2024	Shantanu Thakur	Bharatiya Janata Party

- ^ denotes by-election

== Election results ==
=== General election 2024 ===
2024 Indian general elections: Bongaon
Party	Candidate	Votes	%	±%
BJP	Shantanu Thakur	719,505	48.19	−0.66
AITC	Biswajit Das	645,812	43.25	+2.33
INC	Pradip Biswas	65,176	4.37	+2.36
NOTA	None of the above			
Majority		73,693		
Turnout				
BJP hold		Swing		

=== General election 2019 ===
In 2019 Election BJP won for the first time in this constituency since its delimitation.

2019 Indian general election: Bangaon
Party	Candidate	Votes	%	±%
BJP	Shantanu Thakur	687,622	48.85	+24.68
AITC	Mamata Thakur	576,028	40.92	−2.35
CPI(M)	Alakesh Das	90,122	6.40	−19.9
INC	Sourav Prasad	22,618	1.61	−0.72
Independent	Animesh Chandra Halder	9,522	0.68	
BSP	Chandan Mallick	4,707	0.33	
SUCI(C)	Swapan Mondal	4,544	0.32	
PDS	Samaresh Biswas	1,913	0.14	
Independent	Swapan Kumar Roy	1,859	0.13	
BMP	Subrata Biswas	1,291	0.09	
NOTA	None of the above	7,512	0.53	
Majority		1,11,594	11.42	
Turnout		14,08,653	82.64	
Registered electors		1,704,632		
BJP gain from AITC		Swing		

=== Bye-poll 2015 ===
The bye election occurred on 13 February 2015 due to the death of sitting MP Kapil Krishna Thakur on 13 October 2014. Mamata Thakur of Trinamool Congress defeated Debesh Das of CPIM.

Bye election, 2015: Bangaon
Party	Candidate	Votes	%	±%
AITC	Mamata Thakur	5,39,999	43.27	+0.33
CPI(M)	Debesh Das	3,28,214	26.30	−5.22
BJP	Subrata Thakur	314,214	24.17	+5.10
INC	Kuntal Mandal	29,149	2.33	−1.09
Majority		2,11,785	22.9	
Turnout		12,48,359	79.75	
AITC hold		Swing		

=== General election 2014 ===
2014 Indian general elections: Bangaon
Party	Candidate	Votes	%	±%
AITC	Kapil Krishna Thakur	551,213	42.94	−7.75
CPI(M)	Debesh Das	404,612	31.52	−10.56
BJP	K.D. Biswas	244,783	19.07	+15.12
INC	Ila Mondal	43,866	3.42	+3.42
BSP	Chandan Mullick	9,207		
Independent	Pranita Mandal	8,738		
SUCI(C)	Swapan Mondal	3,589		
AMB	Tarapada Biswas	2,848		
PDS	Shyam Prasad Mondal	2,624		
Rashtriya Ahinsa Manch	Sarat Chandra Mandal	1,172		
The Religion of Man Revolving Political Party of India	Pinaki Ranjan Bharati	1,071		
None of the Above	None of the Above	9,965	0.78	−−−
Majority		1,46,601	11.42	−2.81
Turnout		12,83,688	83.32	
AITC hold		Swing		

=== General election 2009 ===
General Election, 2009: Bangaon
Party	Candidate	Votes	%	±%
AITC	Gobinda Chandra Naskar	546,596	50.69	
CPI(M)	Dr. Asim Bala	453,770	42.08	
BJP	Krishnapada Majumder	42,610	3.95	
BSP	Pranita Roy	17,178	1.59	
LJP	Probir Kumar Sarkar	4,557	0.42	
RPI(A)	Sukriti Ranjan Biswas	5974	0.55	
Independent	Nishikanta Biswas	7,550	0.70	
Majority		92,826		
Turnout		1,078,235	86.47	
AITC win (new seat)				

2009 Indian general election West Bengal summary
Party	Seats won	Seat change	Vote percentage
Trinamool Congress	19	▲18	31.8
Indian National Congress	6	▲0	13.45
Socialist Unity Centre of India (Communist)	1	▲1	NA
Communist Party of India (Marxist)	9	▼17	33.1
Communist Party of India	2	▼1	3.6
Revolutionary Socialist Party	2	▼1	3.56
Forward bloc	2	▼1	3.04
Bharatiya Janata Party	1	▲1	6.14

== See also ==
- List of constituencies of the Lok Sabha
