= Nirmal Kanti Chatterjee =

Indian politician (born 1925)

Member of Parliament, Lok Sabha
- In office 1989–1998
- Preceded by: Asutosh Law
- Succeeded by: Tapan Sikdar
- Constituency: Dum Dum, West Bengal

Member of Parliament, Rajya Sabha
- In office 1982–1988
- Constituency: West Bengal

Personal details
- Born: 1 March 1925 Calcutta, Bengal Presidency, British India
- Party: Communist Party of India (Marxist)
- Other political affiliations: Communist Party of India
- Spouse: Meera Chatterjee

Nirmal Kanti Chatterjee (born 1 March 1925) is an Indian politician. He was elected to the Lok Sabha, lower house of the Parliament of India from Dum Dum as a member of the Communist Party of India (Marxist). Chatterjee was noted in March 2015 as being one of two surviving founders of the Jatiya Sangha.
