= Biswajit Das (politician) =

Indian politician

Member of the West Bengal Legislative Assembly
- In office 2 May 2021 – 19 April 2024
- Preceded by: Dulal Bar
- Succeeded by: Madhuparna Thakur
- Constituency: Bagdah
- In office 2011–2021
- Preceded by: Gopal Seth
- Succeeded by: Ashok Kirtania
- Constituency: Bangaon Uttar

Personal details
- Born: 11 April 1967 (age 59)
- Party: Trinamool Congress (2010–2019, 2021–present)
- Other political affiliations: Bharatiya Janata Party (2019–2021)
- Spouse: Suvra Das
- Education: 10th Pass
- Profession: Social Worker & Farmer

Biswajit Das (born 11 April 1967) is an Indian politician from the Trinamool Congress party. In May 2021, he was elected as a member of the West Bengal Legislative Assembly from Bagdah constituency. He ran for the office as a member of the Bharatiya Janata Party and defeated Paritosh Kumar Saha of TMC by 9,792 votes in 2021 West Bengal Assembly election, but returned to TMC later in 2021.

In 2011 & 2016, he was elected to the West Bengal Legislative Assembly from Bangaon Uttar as All India Trinamool Congress candidate before joining Bharatiya Janata Party in 2019.

State Legislative Assembly
Preceded by Dulal Chandra Bar (BJP)	Member of the West Bengal Legislative Assembly from Bagdah Assembly constituency 2021– present	Incumbent
