= Manjul Krishna Thakur =

Indian politician

Minister of State for Refugee Relief & Rehabilitation (Independent Charge), Government of West Bengal
- In office May 20, 2011 – 2015
- Governor: M. K. Narayanan

Minister of State for Micro & Small Scale Enterprises and Textiles (Independent Charge), Government of West Bengal
- In office May 20, 2011 – 2015
- Governor: M. K. Narayanan

MLA, West Bengal
- In office May 13, 2011 – 2016
- Governor: M. K. Narayanan
- Constituency: Gaighata

Personal details
- Born: Thakurnagar
- Party: All India Trinamool Congress
- Children: Subrata Thakur, Shantanu Thakur
- Parents: Pramatha Ranjan Thakur (father); Boro Maa (mother)

Manjul Krishna Thakur (b 1952/53) is an Indian politician and the former Minister of State for Refugee Relief & Rehabilitation (Independent Charge) and the Minister of State for Micro & Small Scale Enterprises and Textiles in the Government of West Bengal. He lives in Thakurnagar.

He became MLA in 2011, elected from the Gaighata constituency in the 2011 West Bengal state assembly election. The term ended in 2016.

Kapil Krishna Thakur, the former MP from Bangaon, was his elder brother. He is the second son of Matua Barama Binapani Devi. His son, Shantanu Thakur, was elected to Lok Sabha on BJP ticket in 2019. Subrata Thakur, who is also Manjul Krishna's son, had contested bye-poll from Bangaon (Lok Sabha constituency) on BJP's ticket in 2015 but he came third. Manjul Krishna Thakur had himself joined BJP for 4–5 months in 2014 but was accepted back in Trinamool fold upon his request.
