= Surajit Kumar Biswas =

Indian politician

Surajit Kumar Biswas (born 1940) is an Indian politician from West Bengal. He is a member of the West Bengal Legislative Assembly from Bongaon Dakshin Assembly constituency, which is reserved for Scheduled Caste community, in North 24 Parganas district. He won the 2016 West Bengal Legislative Assembly election representing the All India Trinamool Congress.

== Early life and education ==
Biswas is from Gaighata, North 24 Parganas district, West Bengal. He is the son of late Nilratan Biswas. He completed his BA at a college affiliated with the University of Calcutta in 1961. He is a retired state government employee and his wife is a retired higher secondary school teacher.

== Career ==
Biswas won from Bongaon Dakshin Assembly constituency representing the All India Trinamool Congress in the 2016 West Bengal Legislative Assembly election. He polled 92,379 votes and defeated his nearest rival, Ramendranath Audhya of the Communist Party of India (Marxist), by a margin of 26,904 votes. He first became an MLA winning the 2011 West Bengal Legislative Assembly election where he polled 87,677 votes to defeat Anuj Baran Sarkar, also of CPI (M), by a margin of 21,889 votes. He was denied a ticket to contest the 2021 Assembly election.
