= Kapil Krishna Thakur =

Indian politician

Member of Parliament, Lok Sabha
- In office 16 May 2014 – 13 October 2014
- Preceded by: Gobinda Chandra Naskar
- Succeeded by: Mamata Thakur
- Constituency: Bangaon

Personal details
- Born: 13 June 1940
- Died: 13 October 2014 (aged 74) Kolkata
- Party: Trinamool Congress

Kapil Krishna Thakur (1940–2014) was an Indian politician. He hailed from Thakurnagar in West Bengal.

He was elected to the 16th Lok Sabha in the 2014 Indian general election from Bangaon (Lok Sabha constituency), West Bengal, as an All India Trinamool Congress candidate. But he died just a few months into his term.

He was a graduate of the University of Calcutta. He was the eldest son of Matua Boro Maa Binapani Devi and the sanghadhipati of Matua Mahasangha. Majulkrishna Thakur, who is also a politician, is his younger brother.

He died at Kolkata on 13 October 2014, after being ill for sometime.
