= Pankaj Ghosh =

Indian politician

Member of West Bengal Legislative Assembly
- In office 1996–2006
- Preceded by: Bhupendranath Seth
- Succeeded by: Bhupendranath Seth
- Constituency: Bangaon Uttar

President, North 24 Parganas District Committee, All India Kishan Sabha

Pankaj Ghosh is an Indian politician belonging to the Communist Party of India (Marxist). He is an ex member of West Bengal Legislative Assembly. He was elected as MLA of Bangaon Uttar in 1996 and 2001 by defeating Bhupendra nath Seth. Currently, Pankaj Ghosh is a Secretariat member of North 24 Pargana district committee of CPI(M)

== Early life ==
Although Pankaj Ghosh started his career as a physics teacher at Gopalnagar Haripada Institute, he left his job shortly after and joined the CPI(M) as a full-time worker.
