= Dulal Chandra Bar =

Indian politician

West Bengal Legislative Assembly
- In office 2016–2021
- Succeeded by: Biswajit Das
- Constituency: Bagdah
- In office 2006–2011
- Preceded by: Kamalakshmi Biswas
- Succeeded by: Upendra Nath Biswas

Personal details
- Born: Sagarpur, Bagdah, West Bengal
- Party: Independent (2026–present)
- Other political affiliations: Bharatiya Janata Party (2021-2026); Indian National Congress (2016–2021); All India Trinamool Congress (2006–2011)
- Education: University of Calcutta
- Profession: Politician

Dulal Chandra Bar is an Indian politician belonging to the Bharatiya Janata Party. He represented Bagdah in the West Bengal Legislative Assembly between 2006 and 2011, and then later from 2016 to 2021.

== Early life and education ==
Bar was born in Sagarpur, a village of Bagdah to Dilip Kumar Bar in 1966. Dulal Bar graduated from Dinabandhu Mahavidyalay, Bangaon with B.Sc degree, affiliated with Calcutta University, in 1995.

State Legislative Assembly
Preceded by Kamalakshmi Biswas (AIFB)	Member of the West Bengal Legislative Assembly from Bagdah Assembly constituency 2006–2011	Succeeded by Upendra Nath Biswas (AITC)

State Legislative Assembly
Preceded by Upendra Nath Biswas (AITC)	Member of the West Bengal Legislative Assembly from Bagdah Assembly constituency 2016–2021	Succeeded by Biswajit Das (BJP)
