= Ashok Kirtania =

Indian politician

Cabinet Minister, Government of West Bengal
- Incumbent
- Assumed office 9 May 2026
- Governor: R. N. Ravi
- Chief Minister: Suvendu Adhikari
- Departments: Food and Supplies, Co-operation
- Preceded by: Rathin Ghosh

Member of the West Bengal Legislative Assembly
- Incumbent
- Assumed office 2 May 2021
- Preceded by: Bishwajit Das
- Constituency: Bangaon Uttar

Personal details
- Party: Bharatiya Janata Party
- Education: B.A.
- Alma mater: Dinabandhu Mahavidyalay
- Profession: Business

Ashok Kirtania, a 52-year-old graduate is an Indian politician from Bharatiya Janata Party. He is a prominent leader from the Matua community. In May 2021, he was elected as a member of the West Bengal Legislative Assembly from Bangaon Uttar (constituency). Bangaon Uttar is a Scheduled Caste-reserved constituency in North 24 Parganas district, located in the Bangaon subdivision.

== Political career ==
He defeated Shyamal Roy of All India Trinamool Congress by 10,488 votes in 2021 West Bengal Assembly election. In 2026, he clinched victory once again, defeating TMC's Biswajit Das by a margin of 40,670 votes. With 1,19,317 votes, he secured 56.46% of the total vote share.

Ashok Kirtania, a prominent leader from North 24 Parganas and MLA from Bangaon North, was appointed as the Food Minister in the newly formed Bengal government led by Suvendu Adhikari. As Food Minister, he oversees the state's public distribution system, ration delivery network, and implementation of welfare-linked food schemes.
