= Shantanu Thakur =

Indian politician (born 1982)

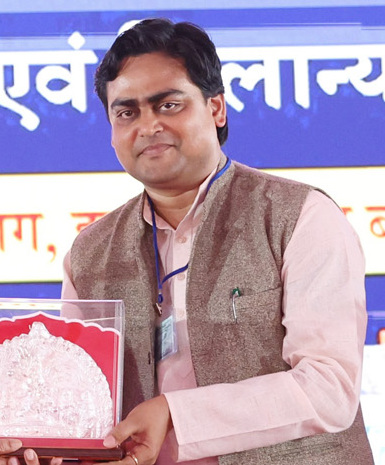
- Thakur in 2024

Union Minister of State for Ports, Shipping and Waterways, Government of India
- Incumbent
- Assumed office 8 July 2021 Serving with Shripad Naik
- Prime Minister: Narendra Modi
- Minister: Sarbananda Sonowal
- Preceded by: Mansukh L. Mandaviya

Member of Parliament, Lok Sabha
- Incumbent
- Assumed office 23 May 2019
- Preceded by: Mamata Thakur
- Constituency: Bangaon

Personal details
- Born: 3 August 1982 (age 44) Thakurnagar, North 24 Parganas, West Bengal, India
- Party: Bharatiya Janata Party
- Spouse: Soma Thakur (m. 2011)
- Relations: Subrata Thakur (brother)
- Children: 2 sons
- Parents: Manjul Krishna Thakur (father); Chhabi Rani Thakur (mother)
- Education: Honours in English Literature & Advanced Diploma in Hospitality Management
- Alma mater: Victoria University, Karnataka State Open University
- Profession: Politician, Dharmaguru of Matua Mahasangha
- As of 17 August 2019

Shantanu Thakur (born 1982) is an Indian politician, who has been a Member of Lok Sabha for Bangaon since 2019. He was sworn in as Union Minister of State, Ministry of Ports, Shipping and Waterways after the Cabinet reshuffle on 7 July 2021.

== Personal life ==
Thakur comes from Matua community which is similar to Hindu Dalit communities but unlike them it is considered as a different religious sect. He wrestled the Bangaon seat from his aunt Mamta Thakur, who is associated with All India Trinamool Congress. He graduated with a degree in English (Honours) and holds an Advanced Diploma in Hospitality Management. He pursued his education at Karnataka Open University and Victoria University in Sydney, Australia.

== Political career ==
In the 2019 general election, he became the first non-TMC MP to be elected in this constituency since its delimitation when he was elected on BJP's ticket. He is the son of ex-Bengal Minister Manjul Krishna Thakur. He is a leader of All India Matua Mahasangha.

== Criminal case ==
He is facing a criminal case under Section 307 of the Indian Penal Code, which relates to attempt to murder.

== Position held ==
He has been serving as Union Minister of State in the Ministry of Ports, Shipping, and Waterways since 7 July 2021 and was reappointed to the same position on 9 June 2024 after being elected to the 18th Lok Sabha. He is also a Member of the Consultative Committee for the Ministry of Rural Development and the Ministry of Panchayati Raj. Previously, he served as a Member of the Standing Committee on Commerce from 13 September 2019 to 7 July 2021.

== See also ==
- Third Modi ministry
