= Niren Ghosh =

Indian politician

Member of Parliament, Lok Sabha
- In office 1980-1984
- Preceded by: Ashok Krishna Dutt
- Succeeded by: Asutosh Laha
- Constituency: Dum Dum, West Bengal

Personal details
- Party: Communist Party of India (Marxist)

Niren Ghosh was an Indian politician. He was elected to the Lok Sabha, lower house of the Parliament of India from Dum Dum in 1980 as a member of the Communist Party of India (Marxist).
