= Bharhutbrahma =

Bharhutbrahma is the messenger-in-dream of the creator God Brahmaparameshwara of traditional Indian religions which endorse a plethora of so many different kinds of ideas. But the concept of Bharhutbrahma is unique.

== See also ==
- Namasudra
