= Gaighata Assembly constituency =

Gaighata
- Constituency No. 97 for the West Bengal Legislative Assembly
- Interactive Map Outlining Gaighata Assembly Constituency

Constituency details
- Country: India
- Region: East India
- State: West Bengal
- District: North 24 Parganas
- Lok Sabha constituency: Bangaon
- Established: 1967
- Total electors: 252,053
- Reservation: SC

Member of Legislative Assembly
- 18th West Bengal Legislative Assembly
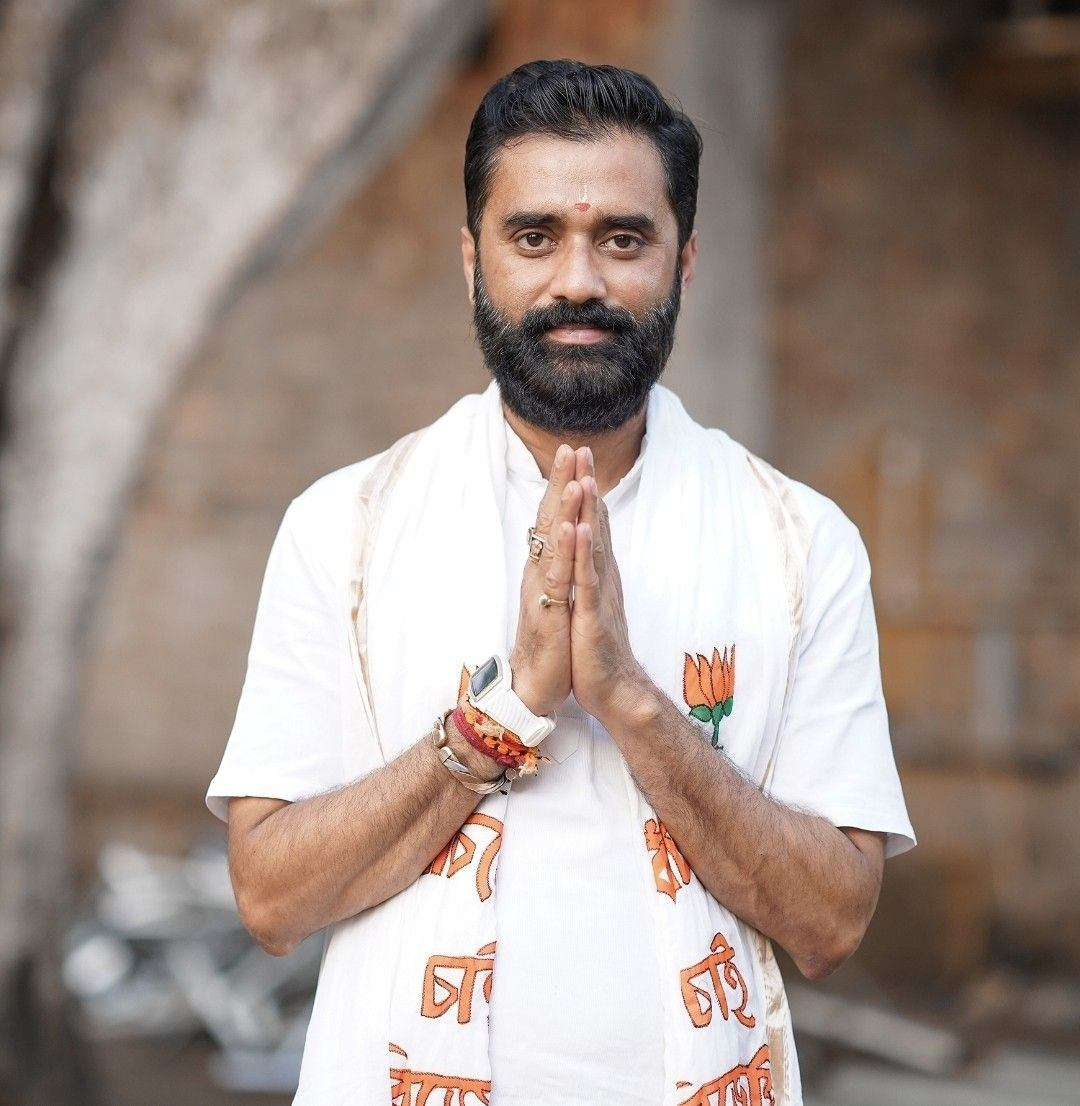
- Incumbent Subrata Thakur
- Party: BJP
- Alliance: NDA
- Elected year: 2026

Election wins by party in Gaighata (1967–2026)
1. CPI(M) (26.7%)
2. Trinamool Congress (26.7%)
3. National Congress (20.0%)
4. BJP (13.3%)
5. Bangla Congress (13.3%)
6. Other (0.00%)

Gaighata Assembly constituency is an assembly constituency in North 24 Parganas district in the Indian state of West Bengal. It is reserved for scheduled castes.

== Overview ==
As per orders of the Delimitation Commission, No. 97 Gaighata Assembly constituency (SC) is composed of the following: Gobardanga municipality, Dharmapur I, Dharmapur II, Ichapur I, Ichapur II, Jaleswar I, Shimulpur and Sutia gram panchayats of Gaighata community development block, and Bergum I, Bergum II and Machhalandpur I gram panchayats of Habra I community development block.

Gaighata Assembly constituency (SC) is part of No. 14 Bangaon (Lok Sabha constituency) (SC). It was earlier part of Barasat (Lok Sabha constituency).

== Members of the Legislative Assembly ==
Year	Member	Party
1967	Chandi Pada Mitra	Bangla Congress
1969	Parul Saha	Bangla Congress
1971	Chandi Pada Mitra	Indian National Congress
1972	Chandi Pada Mitra	Indian National Congress
1977	Kanti Biswas	Communist Party of India
1982	Kanti Biswas	Communist Party of India
1987	Kanti Biswas	Communist Party of India
1991	Prabir Banejee	Indian National Congress
1996	Manmatha Roy	Communist Party of India
2001	Jyotipriya Mallick	All India Trinamool Congress
2006	Jyotipriya Mallick	All India Trinamool Congress
2011	Manjul Krishna Thakur	All India Trinamool Congress
2016	Pulin Bihari Ray	All India Trinamool Congress
2021	Subrata Thakur	Bharatiya Janata Party
2026	Subrata Thakur	Bharatiya Janata Party

== Election results ==
=== 2026 ===
2026 West Bengal Legislative Assembly election: Gaighata
Party	Candidate	Votes	%	±%
BJP	Subrata Thakur	121,322	57.99	+10.72
AITC	Narottam Biswas	73,639	35.2	−7.58
CPI	Sajal Biswas	9,003	4.3	−2.66
NOTA	None of the above	994	0.48	−0.18
Majority		47,683	22.79	+18.3
Turnout		209,201	93.59	+8.99
BJP hold		Swing		

=== 2021 ===
In the 2021 election, Subrata Thakur of BJP defeated his nearest rival NAROTTAM BISWAS of AITC.

2021 West Bengal Legislative Assembly election: Gaighata
Party	Candidate	Votes	%	±%
BJP	Subrata Thakur	100,808	47.27	
AITC	Narottam Biswas	91,230	42.78	
CPI	Kapil Krishna Thakur	14,838	6.96	
NOTA	None of the above	1,409	0.66	
Majority		9,578	4.49	
Turnout		213,243	84.6	
BJP gain from AITC		Swing	{{{swing}}}	

=== 2016 ===
West Bengal assembly elections, 2016: Gaighata (SC) constituency
Party	Candidate	Votes	%	±%
AITC	Pulin Bihari Ray	93812	48.62%	
CPI	Kapil Krishna Thakur	64240	33.29	
BJP	Sankar Thakur	28796	14.92	
NOTA	NOTA	1587	0.82%	
Bahujan Samaj Party	Anil Bairagi	1502	0.78%	
independent	Nandita Mondal	1388	0.72%	
Turnout		192949	86.02%	
SUCI(C)	Nanibala Biswas ( Das)	917	0.48	
AITC hold		Swing		

|- class="vcard"

| style="color:inherit; background-color: &#35;DCDCDC; width: 5px;" | | class="org" style="width: 130px" | Independent !scope=row style="text-align:left; font-weight:normal; color:inherit; background:inherit;" class="fn" | Bikash Biswas | style="text-align: right; margin-right: 0.5em" | 707 | style="text-align: right; margin-right: 0.5em" | 0.37% | style="color: #2C2C2C; vertical-align: middle; font-size: smaller; text-align: center;" class="table-na" | |-

.# Swing calculated on Congress+Trinamool Congress vote percentages taken together in 2006.

=== 2011 ===
In the 2011 election, Majulkrishna Thakur of Trinamool Congress defeated his nearest rival Monoj Kanti Biswas of CPI.

West Bengal assembly elections, 2011: Gaighata (SC) constituency
Party	Candidate	Votes	%	±%
AITC	Majulkrishna Thakur	91,487	55.58	+5.15#
CPI	Monoj Kanti Biswas	66,040	40.12	−5.67
BJP	Sukharanjan Bepari	3,440	2.09	
BSP	Mahendra Gain	1,436		
Independent	Suman Laha	1,249		
independent	Tikendrajit Bharati	946		
Turnout		164,598	88.66	
AITC hold		Swing	10.82#	

.# Swing calculated on Congress+Trinamool Congress vote percentages taken together in 2006.

=== 2006 ===
In the 2006 and 2001 state assembly electionsJyotipriya Mallick of Trinamool Congress won the Gaighata assembly seat defeating Manmatha Roy of CPI(M) on both occasions. Contests in most years were multi cornered but only winners and runners are being mentioned. In 1996, Manmatha Roy of CPI(M) defeated Prabir Banerjee of Congress. In 1991, Prabir Banejee of Congress defeated Kanti Biswas of CPI(M). Kanti Biswas of CPI(M) defeated Radha Prasad Biswas of Congress in 1987, Mira Mitra of Congress in 1982, and Radha Prasad Biswas of Congress in 1977.

=== 1972 ===
Chandi Pada Mitra of Congress won in 1972 and 1971. Parul Saha of Bangla Congress won in 1969. C.Mitra of Bangla Congress won in 1967. Prior to that the Gaighata seat was not there.
