= Subrata Thakur =

Indian politician

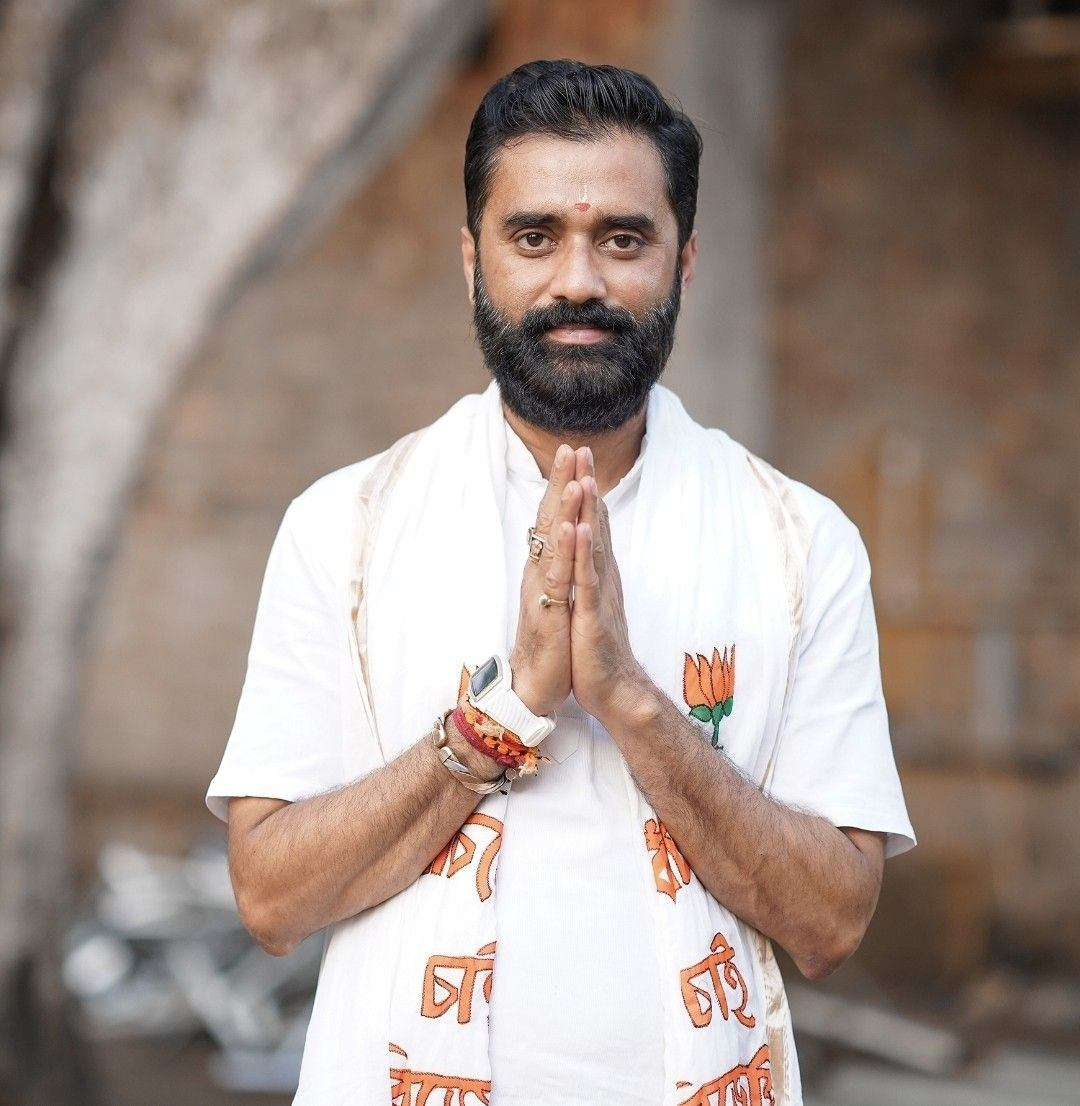
- Subrata Thakur in 2026

Member of the West Bengal Legislative Assembly
- Incumbent
- Assumed office 2 May 2021
- Preceded by: Pulin Bihari Ray
- Constituency: Gaighata

Personal details
- Born: July 1, 1980 (age 46) Thakurnagar, North 24 Parganas, West Bengal, India
- Party: Bharatiya Janata Party
- Relations: Shantanu Thakur (brother)
- Parent: Manjul Krishna Thakur (father)
- Education: Diploma of Hospitality Management
- Alma mater: Austech Institute of Further Education
- Profession: Social Worker

Subrata Thakur (born 1 July, 1980) is an Indian politician from Bharatiya Janata Party. In May 2021, he was elected as a member of the West Bengal Legislative Assembly from Gaighata(constituency). He defeated Narottam Biswas of All India Trinamool Congress by 9,578 votes in 2021 West Bengal Assembly election.
