= Mamata Bala Thakur =

Indian politician

Mamata Thakur

Member of Parliament, Rajya Sabha from West Bengal
- Incumbent
- Assumed office 3 April 2024
- Preceded by: Subhasish Chakraborty

Member of Parliament, Lok Sabha from West Bengal
- In office 16 February 2015 – 23 May 2019
- Preceded by: Kapil Krishna Thakur
- Succeeded by: Shantanu Thakur
- Constituency: Bangaon

Personal details
- Born: 15 May 1967 (age 59) Chandrapur, Maharashtra, India
- Party: Trinamool Congress (until 2026); Mamata All India Trinamool Congress (from 2026)
- Children: Madhuparna Thakur
- Profession: Social worker Politician

Mamata Thakur (born 15 May 1967), is an Indian politician and member of Rajya Sabha from West Bengal, and belongs to the Mamata All India Trinamool Congress. She was elected to the Lok Sabha in a 2015 by-election, representing Bangaon from the TMC. She came second in 2019 election, losing to BJP's candidate.

Mamata Thakur was nominated as Trinamool Congress party's candidate for the Rajya Sabha polls in 2024.

== Career ==
From March 2015 she served as a member of the Standing Committee on Social Justice and Empowerment; the term ended when that Lok Sabha was dissolved in 2019. She is a Matua Maha religious mother of the Matua Mahasangha community. She lives in the town of Thakurnagar.
