= Soma Thakur =

Indian politician

Soma Thakur (born 1998) is an Indian politician from West Bengal. She is a member of the West Bengal Legislative Assembly from Bagdah Assembly constituency, which is reserved for Scheduled Caste community in North 24 Parganas district, representing the Bharatiya Janata Party.

Thakur is from Gaighata, North 24 Parganas district, West Bengal. She married Shantanu Thakur, who is also into politics and Member of the Parliament. She did her Master of Arts in history at Rabindra Bharati University in 2014.

Thakur won the Bagdah Assembly constituency representing the Bharatiya Janata Party in the 2026 West Bengal Legislative Assembly election. She defeated Madhuparna Thakur of AITC by a margin of 34,616 votes.
