= Dum Dum Lok Sabha constituency =

Lok Sabha constituency in West Bengal

Coordinates: 22°37′N 88°25′E

Dum Dum WB-16
- Lok Sabha constituency
- Interactive Map Outlining Dum Dum Lok Sabha Constituency

Constituency details
- Country: India
- Region: East India
- State: West Bengal
- Assembly constituencies: Khardaha; Dum Dum Uttar; Panihati; Kamarhati; Baranagar; Dum Dum; Rajarhat Gopalpur
- Established: 1977
- Total electors: 1,699,656
- Reservation: None

Member of Parliament
- 18th Lok Sabha
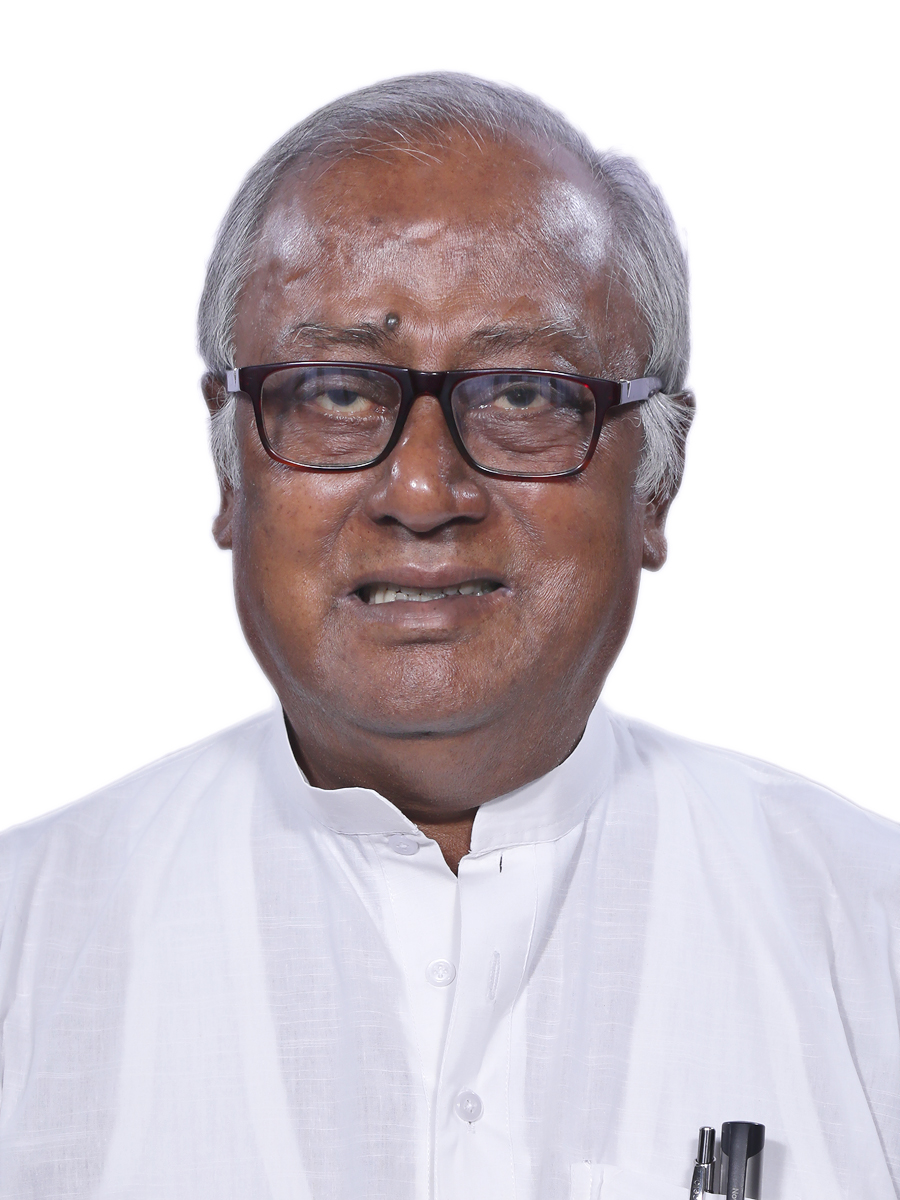
- Incumbent Saugata Roy
- Party: AITC
- Alliance: INDIA
- Elected year: 2024

Party-wise wins in Dum Dum Lok Sabha constituency
1. Communist Party of India (Marxist) (5) (38.5%)
2. All India Trinamool Congress (4) (30.8%)
3. Bharatiya Janata Party (2) (15.4%)
4. Indian National Congress (1) (7.69%)
5. Bharatiya Lok Dal (1) (7.69%)

Dum Dum Lok Sabha constituency is one of the 543 parliamentary constituencies in India. The constituency centres on Dum Dum in West Bengal. All the seven assembly segments of No.16 Dum Dum Lok Sabha constituency are in North 24 Parganas district.

== Assembly segments ==
Parliamentary constituencies in West Bengal - 1. Cooch Behar, 2. Alipurduars, 3. Jalpaiguri, 4. Darjeeling, 5. Raiganj, 6. Balurghat, 7. Maldaha Uttar, 8. Maldaha Dakshin, 9. Jangipur, 10. Baharampur, 11. Murshidabad, 12. Krishnanagar, 13. Ranaghat, 14. Bangaon, 15. Barrackpore, 16. Dum Dum, 17. Barasat, 18. Basirhat, 19. Jaynagar, 20. Mathurapur, 21. Diamond Harbour, 22. Jadavpur, 23. Kolkata Dakshin, 24. Kolkata Uttar, 25. Howrah, 26. Uluberia, 27. Serampore, 28. Hooghly, 29. Arambagh, 30. Tamluk, 31, Kanthi, 32. Ghatal, 33. Jhargram, 34. Medinipur, 35. Purulia, 36. Bankura, 37. Bishnupur, 38. Bardhaman Purba, 39. Bardhaman Durgapur, 40. Asansol, 41. Bolpur, 42. Birbhum

As per order of the Delimitation Commission in respect of the delimitation of constituencies in the West Bengal, parliamentary constituency no. 16 Dum Dum is composed of the following segments from 2009:

#	Name	District	Member	Party	2024 Lead
109	Khardaha	North 24 Parganas	Kalyan Chakraborti	BJP	AITC
110	Dum Dum Uttar	North 24 Parganas	Sourav Sikdar	BJP	AITC
111	Panihati	North 24 Parganas	Ratna Debnath	BJP	AITC
112	Kamarhati	North 24 Parganas	Madan Mitra	AITC	AITC
113	Baranagar	North 24 Parganas	Sajal Ghosh	BJP	AITC
114	Dum Dum	North 24 Parganas	Arijit Bakshi	BJP	AITC
117	Rajarhat Gopalpur	North 24 Parganas	Tarunjyoti Tewari	BJP	AITC

== Members of Parliament ==
Most successful parties from Dum Dum Lok Sabha constituency
1. Communist Party of India (Marxist) (5 times) (38.5%)
2. All India Trinamool Congress (4 times) (30.8%)
3. Bharatiya Janata Party (2 times) (15.4%)
4. Indian National Congress (1 time) (7.69%)
5. Bharatiya Lok Dal (1 time) (7.69%)

Year	Member	Party
1977	Ashok Krishna Dutt	Janata Party
1980	Niren Ghosh	Communist Party of India (Marxist)
1984	Asutosh Laha	Indian National Congress
1989	Nirmal Kanti Chatterjee	Communist Party of India (Marxist)
1991	Nirmal Kanti Chatterjee	Communist Party of India (Marxist)
1996	Nirmal Kanti Chatterjee	Communist Party of India (Marxist)
1998	Tapan Sikdar	Bharatiya Janata Party
1999	Tapan Sikdar	Bharatiya Janata Party
2004	Amitava Nandy	Communist Party of India (Marxist)
2009	Saugata Roy	Trinamool Congress
2014	Saugata Roy	Trinamool Congress
2019	Saugata Roy	Trinamool Congress
2024	Saugata Roy	Trinamool Congress

== Election results ==
Vote share of Winning candidates
Year	Percent
2024	41.95%
2019	42.51%
2014	42.67%
2009	47.04%
2004	49.70%
1999	51.59%
1998	50.70%
1996	47.40%
1991	46.10%
1989	55.20%
1984	49%
1980	61.07%
1977	51.13%

=== General election 2024 ===
2024 Indian general elections: Dum Dum
Party	Candidate	Votes	%	±%
AITC	Sougata Roy	528,579	41.95	▼0.56
BJP	Shilbhadra Dutta	457,919	36.34	▼1.77
CPI(M)	Sujan Chakraborty	240,784	19.11	▲5.20
NOTA	None of the above	11,334	0.9	
Majority		70,660	5.61	
Turnout		12,60,046	74.13	
AITC hold		Swing		

=== General election 2019 ===
2019 Indian general elections: Dum Dum
Party	Candidate	Votes	%	±%
AITC	Sougata Roy	512,062	42.51	−0.16
BJP	Samik Bhattacharya	459,063	38.11	+15.61
CPI(M)	Nepaldev Bhattacharya	167,590	13.91	−15.08
INC	Saurav Saha	29,097	2.42	−0.59
NOTA	None of the above	14,491	1.20	
Majority		53,002	4.40	−9.28
Turnout		12,04,695	76.92	−3.64
AITC hold		Swing		

=== General election 2014 ===
2014 Indian general elections: Dum Dum
Party	Candidate	Votes	%	±%
AITC	Sougata Roy	483,244	42.67	−4.37
CPI(M)	Dr. Asim Dasgupta	328,310	28.99	−15.95
BJP	Tapan Sikdar	254,819	22.50	+16.79
INC	Dhananjoy Moitra	34,116	3.01	+3.01
NOTA	None of the Above	16,837	1.49	
Majority		1,54,934	13.68	−11.58
Turnout		11,32,644	80.56	+0.07
AITC hold		Swing		

=== General election 2009 ===
2009 Indian general elections: Dum Dum
Party	Candidate	Votes	%	±%
AITC	Sougata Roy	458,988	47.04	
CPI(M)	Amitava Nandy	438,510	44.94	
BJP	Tapan Sikdar	55,679	5.70	
Majority		20,478	2.09	
Turnout		9,75,684	80.49	
AITC gain from CPI(M)		Swing		

=== General election 2004 ===
General Election, 2004:Dum Dum
Party	Candidate	Votes	%	±%
CPI(M)	Amitava Nandy	619,325	49.70	+9.41
BJP	Tapan Sikdar	521,073	41.90	−9.69
INC	Tapas Majumder	76,854	6.20	−0.99
Majority		98,252	7.90	
Turnout		12,45,065	80.7	
CPI(M) gain from BJP		Swing		

=== General election 1999 ===
General Election, 1999:Dum Dum
Party	Candidate	Votes	%	±%
BJP	Tapan Sikdar	614,471	51.59	+0.89
CPI(M)	Anil Bhattacharya	479,910	40.29	+0.59
INC	Ramesh Bhattacharjee	85,648	7.19	−1.71
Majority		134,561	11.1	
Turnout		12,09,926	75.7	
BJP hold		Swing		

=== General election 1998 ===
General Election, 1998:Dum Dum
Party	Candidate	Votes	%	±%
BJP	Tapan Sikdar	631,383	50.70	+41.9
CPI(M)	Nirmal Kanti Chatterjee	493,978	39.70	−3
INC	Pradyut Guha	111,078	8.90	−33.8
Majority		137,405	10.9	
Turnout		12,62,384	80.9	
BJP gain from CPI(M)		Swing		

=== General election 1996 ===
General Election, 1996:Dum Dum
Party	Candidate	Votes	%	±%
CPI(M)	Nirmal Kanti Chatterjee	580,455	47.40	+1.3
INC	Asutosh Laha	522,164	42.70	+7.67
BJP	Dibakar Kundu	107,501	8.80	−8
Majority		58,291	4.7	
Turnout		12,52,429	81.1	
CPI(M) hold		Swing		

=== General election 1991 ===
General Election, 1991:Dum Dum
Party	Candidate	Votes	%	±%
CPI(M)	Nirmal Kanti Chatterjee	446,564	46.10	−9.1
INC	Lal Bahadur Singh	341,699	35.03	−8.57
BJP	Manohar Aich	163,070	16.80	
Majority		104,865	10.6	
Turnout		9,89,892	74.8	
CPI(M) hold		Swing		

=== General election 1989 ===
General Election, 1989:Dum Dum
Party	Candidate	Votes	%	±%
CPI(M)	Nirmal Kanti Chatterjee	556,139	55.20	+6.5
INC	Asutosh Laha	439,135	43.60	−5.4
BJP	Chitta Ranjan Biswas	10,766	16.80	
Majority		117,004	11.4	
Turnout		10,27,270	79.2	
CPI(M) gain from INC		Swing		

=== General election 1984 ===
General Election, 1984:Dum Dum
Party	Candidate	Votes	%	±%
INC	Asutosh Laha	381,984	49.00	+14.33
CPI(M)	Niren Ghosh	379,281	48.70	−12.37
Majority		2,703	0.3	
Turnout		7,78,814	77.4	
INC gain from CPI(M)		Swing		

=== General election 1980 ===
General Election, 1980:Dum Dum
Party	Candidate	Votes	%	±%
CPI(M)	Niren Ghosh	368,214	61.07	+15.1
INC(I)	Barid Baran Das	202,542	33.59	
JP	Kalyan Brata Roy	19,400	3.22	
Majority		1,65,672	15.1	
Turnout		6,02,917	68.30	
Swing to CPI(M) from BLD		Swing		

=== General election 1977 ===
General Election, 1977:Dum Dum
Party	Candidate	Votes	%	±%
BLD	Ashok Krishna Dutt	215,766	51.13	
CPI	Indrajit Gupta	193,986	45.97	
Independent	Baidyanath Ghosh	12,254	2.90	
Majority		21,780	5.16	
Turnout		4,22,006	61.73	
BLD hold		Swing		

== See also ==
- Dum Dum
- List of constituencies of the Lok Sabha
