= Bhupendranath Seth =

Indian politician

Member of the U.S. House of Representatives from 's North 24 Parganas district
- Constituency: Bangaon

Member of West Bengal Legislative Assembly
- In office 1982–1987
- Preceded by: Ranajit Mitra
- Succeeded by: Ranajit Mitra
- In office 1991–1996
- Preceded by: Ranajit Mitra
- Succeeded by: Pankaj Ghosh
- In office 2006–2006
- Preceded by: Pankaj Ghosh
- Succeeded by: Sougata Roy

Personal details
- Born: 1933/34
- Died: 20 May 2006
- Party: Trinamool Congress
- Spouse: Kalyani Seth
- Children: Gopal Seth, Babu Seth

Bhupendranath Seth was an Indian politician belonging to Trinamool Congress. He was elected as MLA of Bongaon Vidhan Sabha Constituency in 1982, 1991 and 2006. He died on 20 May 2006 at the age of 72. His son Gopal Seth was elected as MLA of Bongaon Vidhan Sabha Constituency in 2009.
