= Gopal Seth =

Indian politician

Administrator, Bongaon Municipality
- Preceded by: Sankar Addhya

MLA of Bongaon Vidhan Sabha Constituency
- In office 2009–2011
- Preceded by: Sougata Roy
- Succeeded by: Constituency Dissolved

Personal details
- Born: 1 December 1964 (age 61) Shimultala, Bongaon, North 24 Parganas
- Party: All India Trinamool Congress
- Children: Manish Seth

Gopal Seth is an Indian politician belonging to All India Trinamool Congress. He was elected as MLA of Bongaon Vidhan Sabha Constituency in West Bengal Legislative Assembly in 2009. His father Bhupendranath Seth was elected as MLA of Bongaon Vidhan Sabha Constituency three times. Now he was a chairman of Bongaon Uttar Bidhansabha committee, All India Trinamool Congress. He was a chairman of Bangaon municipality and president of Bongaon District Trinamool Congress and Resigned on 10 Dec 2025 .
