= 2016 West Bengal Legislative Assembly election =

State legislative assembly election

- 4 April 2016 — 5 May 2016

All 294 seats in the West Bengal Legislative Assembly 148 seats needed for a majority
- Opinion polls
- Registered: 65,939,006
- Turnout: 83.02% (▼1.31 pp)
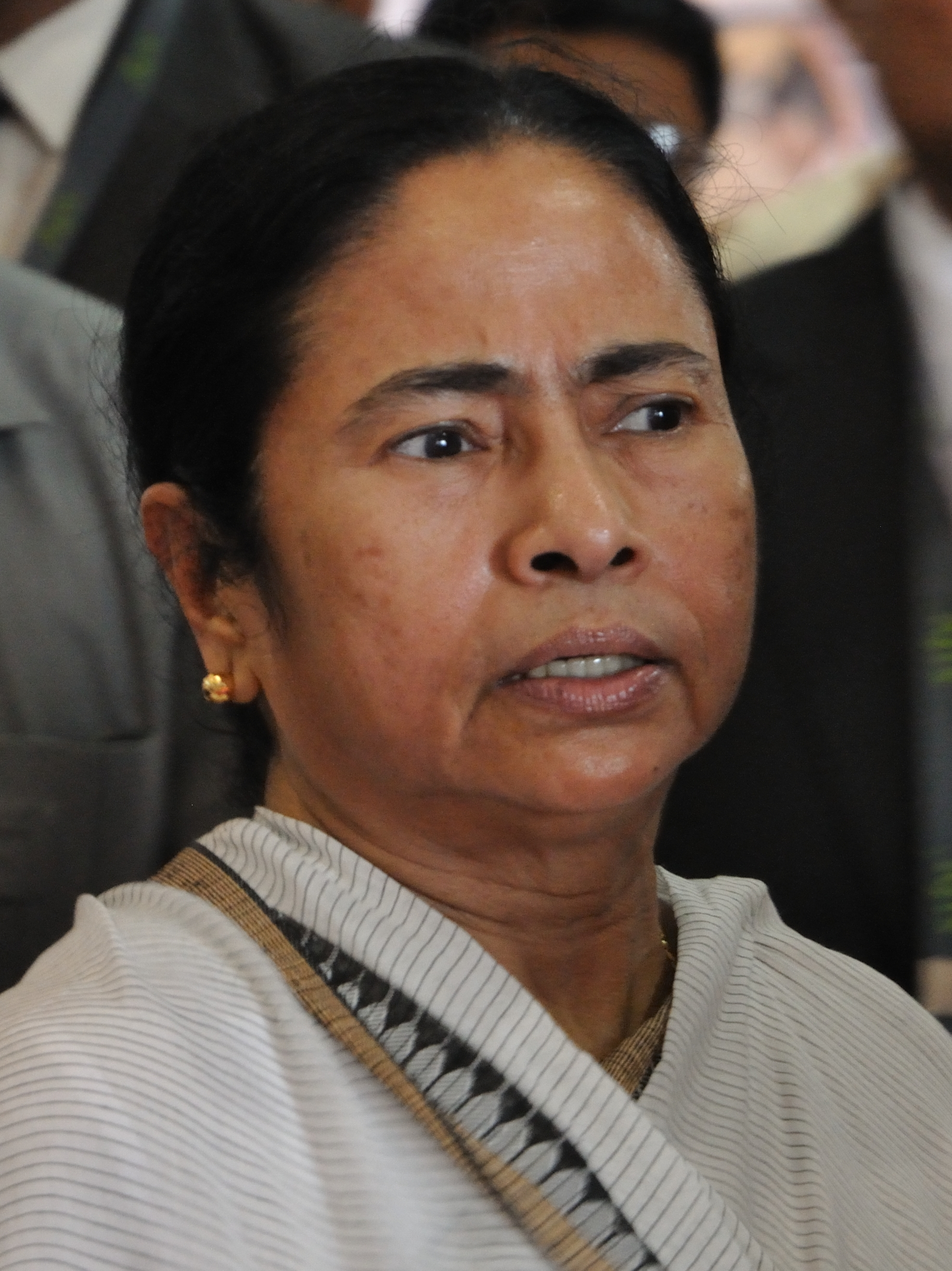

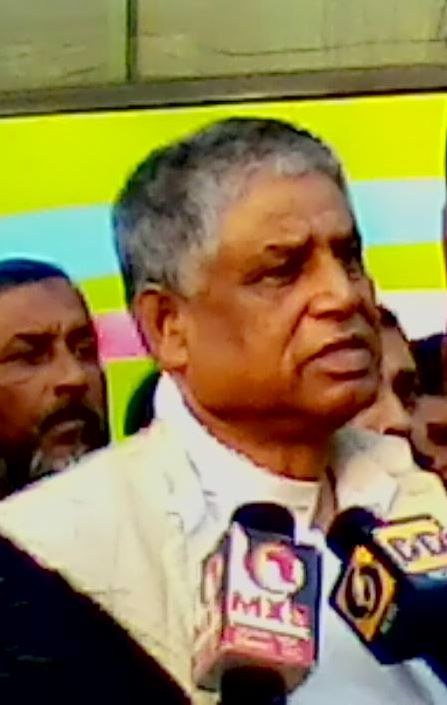

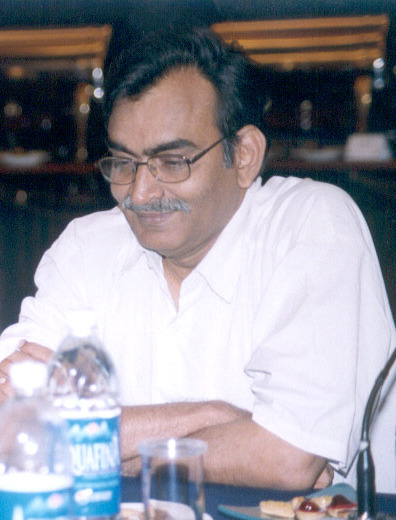
	First party	Second party	Third party
Leader	Mamata Banerjee	Abdul Mannan	Surya Kanta Mishra
Party	AITC	INC	CPI(M)
Alliance	TMC+	LF	LF
Leader since	1998	2015	2011
Leader's seat	Bhabanipur (won)	Champdani (won)	Narayangarh (lost)
Last election	38.93%, 184 seats	9.09%, 42 seats	30.08%, 40 seats
Seats won	211	44	26
Seat change	▲27	▲2	▼14
Coalition vote	24,564,523	6,700,938	1,42,16,327
Percentage	44.91%	12.25%	19.75%
Swing	▲5.98 pp	▲3.16%	▼10.33%
Alliance seats	211	77	77
- Seatwise Result Map of the election

Chief Minister before election
Mamata Banerjee
AITC
Elected Chief Minister
Mamata Banerjee
AITC

Legislative Assembly elections were held in 2016 for all 294 seats of the Vidhan Sabha in the Indian state of West Bengal. The All India Trinamool Congress under Mamata Banerjee won 211 seats, and thus returned to power with an enhanced majority. As in the 2011 election, the election was held in six phases, with the first phase divided into two days. The first phase was held in Naxalite-Maoist affected red corridor areas with two polling dates: 4 April and 11 April. The other phases were held on 17, 21, 25, 30 April and 5 May. The result of the election was declared on 19 May.

In the previous election in 2011, the All India Trinamool Congress in a coalition with INC won a majority and ended the 34-year rule of the Left Front government in the state.

== Background ==
In the previous assembly election in 2011, the All India Trinamool Congress, under the leadership of Mamata Banerjee, won a majority and ended the 34-year rule of the Left Front government. During 2011 election, the main theme of TMC was paribartan (meaning "change"), implying it was time to change the Left Front reign of 34-years in the state. However, during the five year rule of TMC, urban population, in particular, were in general unhappy with the government. Also, newspapers reported that chief minister Banerjee has been only trying to consolidate votes from the sizable Muslim minority.

In January 2016, the Election Commission of India urged the central government to allow it to carry out a limited delimitation exercise in West Bengal to ensure voting rights to people who came to India following the exchange of enclaves between India and Bangladesh. As per updated voter list for the year 2016 published by the Election Commission of India in January 2016, West Bengal has surpassed the rest of the country in elector-population ratio with 0.68. The final electoral roll in West Bengal for 2016 with 6.55 crore voters has 3.39 crore male and 3.16 crore female voters.

=== Major issues ===
Prior to the West Bengal elections, on 3 January 2016, a mob turned violent and vandalised Kaliachak Police station, block development office and public property in Kaliachak, Malda district. Mamata Banerjee's government was severely criticised for not handling the situation better.

The Saradha Group financial scandal, the Narada Sting operation (which showcased the prominent ministers & MPs of the ruling party of accepting bribes), lack of any major industrial investments, and law & order issue surfaced as major issues and proved to be an acid test for Trinamool Congress. The Kolkata flyover collapse also happened during the poll process.

== Schedule ==
Assembly elections in West Bengal were held in seven phases from 4 April to 5 May 2016.

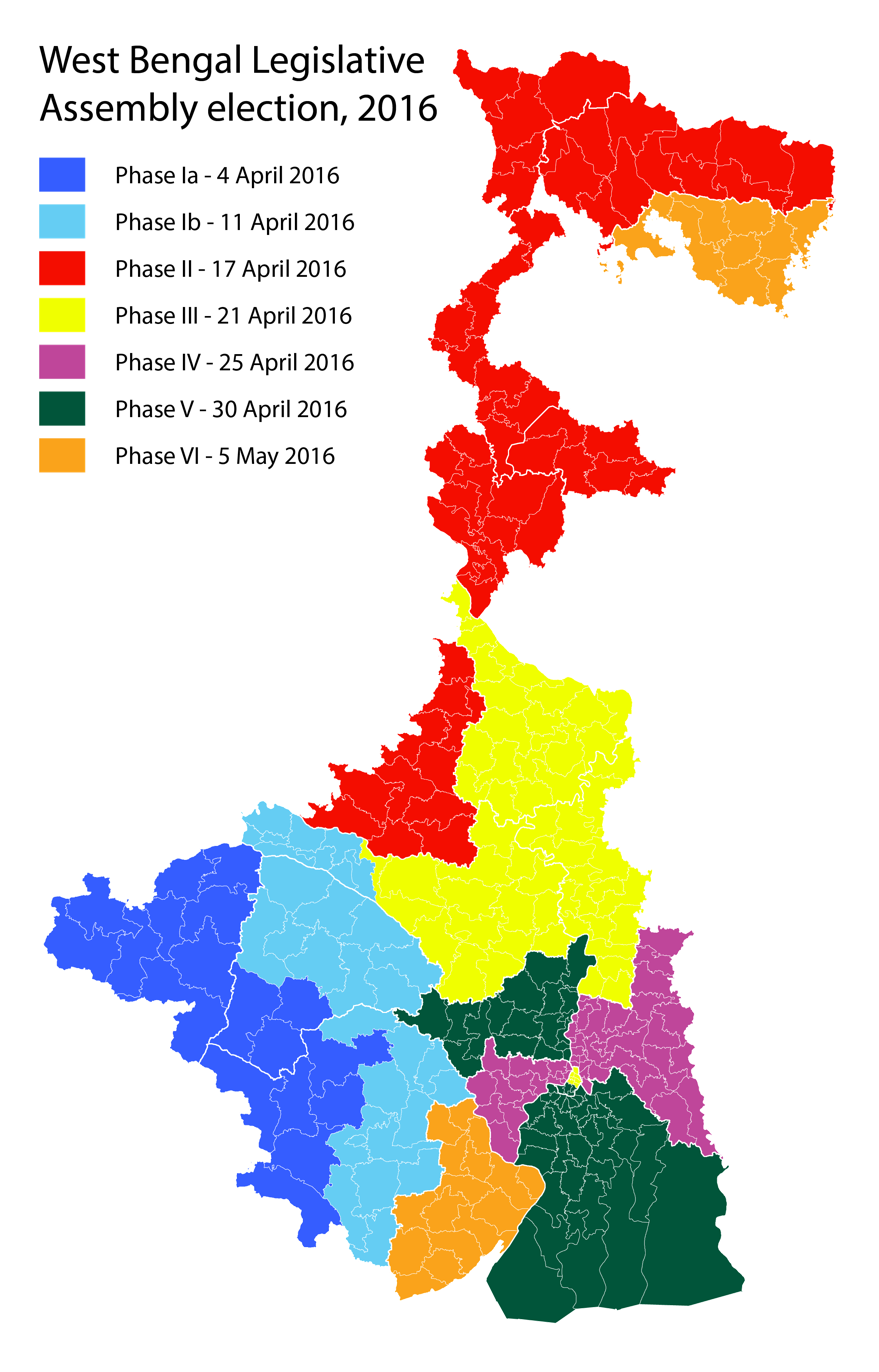
Voting phases.

=== Election dates by constituency ===
Phase	Date	No. of constituencies	Voter turnout
1(a)	4 April 2016	18	84.22%
Nayagram, Gopiballavpur, Jhargram, Salboni, Medinipur, Binpur, Bandwan, Balarampur, Baghmundi, Joypur, Purulia, Manbazar, Kashipur, Para, Raghunathpur, Ranibandh, Raipur, Taldangra.
1(b)	11 April 2016	31	83.73%
Dantan, Keshiary, Kharagpur Sadar, Narayangarh, Sabang, Pingla, Kharagpur, Debra, Daspur, Ghatal, Chandrakona, Garbeta, Keshpur, Saltora, Chhatna, Bankura, Barjora, Onda, Bishnupur, katulpur, Indus, Sonamukhi, Pandabeshwar, Durgapur Purba, Durgapur Paschim, Raniganj, Jamuria, Asansol Dakshin, Asansol Uttar, Kulti, Barabani
2	17 April 2016	56	83.05%
Kumargram, Kalchini, Alipurduars, Falakata, Madarihat, Dhupguri, Maynaguri, Jalpaiguri, Rajganj, Dabgram-Fulbari, Mal, Nagrakata, Kalimpong, Darjeeling, Kurseong, Matigara-Naxalbari, Siliguri, Phansidewa, Chopra, Islampur, Goalpokhar, Chakulia, Karandighi, Hemtabad, Kaliaganj, Raiganj, Itahar, Kushmandi, Kumarganj, Balurghat, Tapan, Gangarampur, Harirampur, Habibpur, Gazole, Chanchal, Harishchandrapur, Malatipur, Ratua, Manikchak, Maldaha, English Bazar, Mothabari, Sujapur, Baisnabnagar, Dubrajpur, Suri, Bolpur, Nanoor, Labpur, Sainthia, Mayureswar, Rampurhat, Hansan, Nalhati, Murarai.
3	21 April 2016	62	82.28%
Farakka, Samserganj, Suti, Jangipur, Raghunathganj, Sagardighi, Lalgola, Bhagawangola, Raninagar, Murshidabad, Nabagram, Khargram, Burwan, Kandi, Bharatpur, Rejinagar, Beldanga, Baharampur, Hariharpara, Nowda, Domkal, Jalangi, Karimpur, Tehatta, Palashipara, Kaliganj, Nakashipara, Chapra, Krishnanagar Uttar, Nabadwip, Krishnanagar Dakshin, Santipur, Ranaghat Uttar Paschim, Krishnaganj, Ranaghat Uttar Purba, Ranaghat Dakshin, Chakdaha, Kalyani, Haringhata, Chowrangee, Entally, Beleghata, Jorasanko, Shyampukur, Maniktala, Kashipur-Belgachhia, Khandaghosh, Bardhamandakshin, Raina, Jamalpur, Monteswar, Kalna, Memari, Bardhaman Uttar, Bhatar, Purbasthali Dakshin, Purbasthali Uttar, Katwa, Ketugram, Mangalkot, Ausgram, Galsi.
4	25 April 2016	49	81.25%
Bagda, Bangaon Uttar, Bangaon Dakshin, Gaighata, Swarupnagar, Baduria, Habra, Ashoknagar, Amdanga, Bijpur, Naihati, Bhatpara, Jagatdal, Noapara, Barrackpur, Khardaha, Dum Dum Uttar, Panihati, Kamarhati, Baranagar, Dum Dum, Rajarhat New Town, Bidhannagar, Rajarhat Gopalpur, Madhyamgram, Barasat, Deganga, Haroa, Minakhan, Sandeshkhali, Basirhat Dakshin, Basirhat Uttar, Hingalganj, Bally, Howrah Uttar, Howrah Madhya, Shibpur, Howrah Dakshin, Sankrail, Panchla, Uluberia Purba, Uluberia Uttar, Uluberia Dakshin, Shyampur, Bagnan, Amta, Udaynarayanpur, Jagatballavpur, Domjur.
5	30 April 2016	53	81.66%
Gosaba, Basanti, Kultali, Patharpratima, Kakdwip, Sagar, Kulpi, Raidighi, Mandirbazar, Jaynagar, Baruipur Purba, Canning Paschim, Canning Purba, Baruipur Paschim, Magrahat Purba, Magrahat Paschim, Diamond Harbour, Falta, Satgachhia, Bishnupur, Sonarpur Dakshin, Bhangar, Kasba, Jadavpur, Sonarpur Uttar, Tollygunge, Behala Purba, Behala Paschim, Maheshtala, Budge Budge, Metiaburuz, Kolkata Port, Bhowanipore, Rashbehari, Ballygunge, Uttarpara, Sreerampur, Champdani, Singur, Chandannagar, Chunchura, Balagarh, Pandua, Saptagram, Chanditala, Jangipara, Haripal, Dhanekhali, Tarakeswar, Pursurah, Arambag, Goghat, Khanakul.
6	5 May 2016	25	86.76%
Mekliganj, Mathabhanga, Cooch behar Uttar, Cooch behar Dakshin, Sitalkuchi, Sitai, Dinhata, Natabari, Tufanganj, Tamluk, Panskura Purba, Panskura Paschim, Moyna, Nandakumar, Mahisadal, Haldia, Nandigram, Chandipur, Patashpur, Kanthi Uttar, Bhagabanpur, Khejuri, Kanthi Dakshin, Ramnagar, Egra.

On 4 March 2016, Election Commission of India announced that 22 assembly constituencies in West Bengal would have Voter-verified paper audit trail (VVPAT) machines attached along with EVMs. Voter-verified paper audit trail (VVPAT) machines were to be in place in more than 5,993 polling stations.

Assembly constituencies of West Bengal having VVPAT facility with EVMs
CoochBehar Dakshin	Alipurduar	Jalpaiguri (SC)
Siliguri	Raiganj	Balurghat
Englishbazar	Murshidabad	Krishnanagar
Barasat	Jadavpur	Ballygunge
Chowrangee	Howrah madhya	Chandannagore
Tamluk	Medinipur	Purulia
Bankura	Bardhaman dakshin	Behala Paschim
Suri		

== Parties and alliances ==
=== Candidates ===
AITC released its candidate list on 5 March, the same day the elections were announced.

On 10 March, BJP released its first candidate list of 52 members.

Left Front consisting of CPI(M), CPI, RSP and All India Forward Bloc along with INC released their respective candidate list in several rounds after consultations and bargaining.

=== Contesting Parties ===
Trinamool Congress+

- All India Trinamool Congress (AITC)
- Jana Andolan Party

Mahajot

- Communist Party of India (Marxist) (CPIM)
- Communist Party of India (CPI)
- Revolutionary Socialist Party (RSP)
- All India Forward Bloc (AIFB)
- Revolutionary Communist Party of India (RCPI)
- Marxist Forward Bloc (MFB)
- Democratic Socialist Party (DSP(PC))
- Indian National Congress (INC)
- Rashtriya Janata Dal (RJD)
- Janata Dal (United) (JD(U))
- Nationalist Congress Party (NCP)
- Communist Party of Bharat (CPB)
- Bharat Nirman Party (Led by Lakshman Chandra Seth)
- Save Democracy Forum
- Independent Candidate

National Democratic Alliance

- Bharatiya Janata Party (BJP)
- Gorkha Janmukti Morcha (GJM)

=== Alliance(s) ===
Following the heavy defeats in the 2011 Assembly elections and the 2014 Indian General Election, the Communist Party of India (Marxist) welcomed ideas of the alliance even with parties not conforming to the communist ideology in general. The first signs came in the Siliguri Municipal Corporation election in 2015, when the CPI(M) made some local understanding with Congress to keep TMC and BJP out of power; resulting in CPI(M) leader Ashok Bhattacharya being appointed as the Mayor of Siliguri. This success then got popularity as 'Siliguri Model'.

After the success of the model, in the long run, some Congress and CPI(M) leaders advocated for a Left-Congress alliance. on the grounds that on summing up individual voteshare of the Congress & Left Front in state polled during the 2014 general elections, were large enough in many areas to defeat the Trinamool Congress. The precedence of the Left Front providing outside support to the UPA-I government in 2004-2008 was cited in support. This gradually materialized into an "alliance" between INC and Left Front in all the seats except a few in Murshidabad district and Maldah district.

Given the political history of West Bengal, the materialisation of an alliance between the Congress & the CPI(M), 2 parties that have been bitter rivals of each other in the state since India's independence in 1947 & have a history of unleashing political violence against each other's cadres, (like 1970 Sainbari murders, during the Emergency era & the 1993 Kolkata firing) took the political circles of the state by surprise. After much dispute and secession of 2 far-left groups : SUCI(C) and CPI(ML)L from the Left Front, both Congress and Communists formed an understanding basis of what they called "seat-sharing", strongly objecting to the use of the word-"alliance". Trinamool Congress claimed that by forging an electoral understanding with the Left Front in the state, the Congress party was insulting the memory of those party workers who had died in political violence perpetrated by the Left Front, & Mamata Banerjee's allegation in 1998 about the state Congress having become a 'B-team' of the Left Front (due to which she broke away from the Congress to create her own party), stood vindicated. The CPI(M) (which had famously refused the Congress' proposal of making veteran Communist leader and one of its founders Jyoti Basu the country's prime minister in 1990, 1991 & 1996 in order not to been seen deviating from the cause of establishing the dictatorship of the proletariat) was similarly accused of compromising with its ideological stance & indulging in hypocrisy by the TMC & BJP for entering into seat-sharing agreement with the Congress.

The ruling All India Trinamool Congress announced its candidate list for all the 294 seats, as they were fighting alone this time. But after the announcement, the candidate from Kalimpong and former Gorkha Janmukti Morcha leader, Harka Bahadur Chettri, stated that he will fight as an independent candidate under the entity of his newly formed political party, Jana Andolan Party, and will be supported by the Trinamool Congress.

The BJP announced its candidate list for 291 seats in several phases, leaving 3 seats of the Darjeeling Hills for their allies, the Gorkha Janmukti Morcha.

== Seat allotment ==
=== Trinamool Congress+ ===
All India Trinamool Congress-led Alliance
Party	Flag	Symbol	Leader	Seats
All India Trinamool Congress			Mamata Banerjee	293
Jana Andolan Party (Note: JAP Contested as Independent in Kalimpong.)			Harka Bahadur Chettri	1
Total				294

=== Mahajot ===
Mahajot
Party	Flag	Symbol	Leader	Seats	
Communist Party of India (Marxist)			Surjya Kanta Mishra	147	148
Marxist Forward Bloc			Samar Hazra	1	148
Indian National Congress			Adhir Ranjan Chowdhury	92	
All India Forward Bloc			Debabrata Biswas	25	
Revolutionary Socialist Party			Manoj Bhattacharya	19	
Communist Party of India			Prabodh Panda	11	
Communist Party of Revolutionary Marxists (Note: CPRM Contested as Independents.)			Ratna Bahadur Rai	3	
Democratic Socialist Party			Prabodh Chandra Sinha	2	
Janata Dal (United)				2	
Rashtriya Janata Dal				1	
Nationalist Congress Party				1	
Independents			Nihar Ranjan Ghosh	1 (Note: Contested in AC 51 English Bazaar constituency.)	7
Independents			Jitendra Shaw (Jitu)	1 (Note: Contested in AC 105 Bhatpara constituency.)	7
Independents			Ambikesh Mahapatra	1 (Note: Contested in AC 153 Behala Purba constituency.)	7
Independents			Protima Dutta	1 (Note: Contested in AC 184 Domjur constituency.)	7
Independents			Siraj Khan	1 (Note: Contested in AC 207 Nandakumar constituency.)	7
Independents			Dr. Subrata Maiti	1 (Note: Contested in AC 208 Mahisadal constituency.)	7
Independents			Ashim Kumar Mondal	1 (Note: Contested in AC 215 Khejuri (SC) constituency.)	7
Total				294+17 (Note: A total of 311 candidates were fielded. These candidates contested 277 unique seats. In 17 of those seats, there were two candidates each, making a total of 34 candidates across those constituencies. Overall, the alliance contested all 294 assembly seats.)	

==== Friendly Fights ====
Sl. No.	Parties Involved	#	Constituency Name
1	CPI(M) and INC	58	Jangipur
2	CPI(M) and INC	75	Domkal
3	CPI(M) and INC	88	Krishnaganj (SC)
4	CPI(M) and INC	60	Sagardighi
5	CPI(M) and INC	73	Hariharpara
6	INC and AIFB	46	Harishchandrapur
7	INC and AIFB	64	Murshidabad
8	INC and AIFB	291	Rampurhat
9	INC and JD(U)	29	Islampur
10	INC and RSP	11	Kalchini (ST)
11	INC and RSP	12	Alipurduars
12	INC and RSP	47	Malatipur
13	INC and RSP	57	Suti
14	INC and RSP	59	Raghunathganj
15	INC and RSP	67	Burwan (SC)
16	INC and RSP	69	Bharatpur
17	INC and RSP	74	Nowda

=== National Democratic Alliance ===
National Democratic Alliance
Party	Flag	Symbol	Leader	Seats
Bharatiya Janata Party			Dilip Ghosh	291
Gorkha Janmukti Morcha			Bimal Gurung	3
Total				294

== Candidates ==
District	Constituency							
District	Constituency		AITC+		Mahajot		NDA	
Cooch Behar	1	Mekliganj (SC)	AITC	Arghya Roy Pradhan	AIFB	Paresh Chandra Adhikary	BJP	Dadhiram Ray
Cooch Behar	2	Mathabhanga (SC)	AITC	Binay Krishna Barman	CPI(M)	Khagen Chandra Barman	BJP	Sushil Barman
Cooch Behar	3	Cooch Behar Uttar (SC)	AITC	Parimal Barman	AIFB	Nagendra Nath Roy	BJP	Sukumar Roy
Cooch Behar	4	Cooch Behar Dakshin	AITC	Mihir Goswami	AIFB	Debasis Banik	BJP	Nikhil Ranjan Dey
Cooch Behar	5	Sitalkuchi (SC)	AITC	Hiten Barman	CPI(M)	Namadipti Adhikary	BJP	Baren Chandra Barman
Cooch Behar	6	Sitai (SC)	AITC	Jagadish Basunia	INC	Keshab Chandra Ray	BJP	Bhaben Chandra Ray
Cooch Behar	7	Dinhata	AITC	Udayan Guha	AIFB	Akshay Thakur	BJP	Sachindra Nath Adhikari
Cooch Behar	8	Natabari	AITC	Rabindra Nath Ghosh	CPI(M)	Tamser Ali	BJP	Ali Hossain
Cooch Behar	9	Tufanganj	AITC	Fazal Karim Miah	INC	Shyamal Chowdhury	BJP	Bivas Sen Ishore
Alipurduar	10	Kumargram (ST)	AITC	James Kujur	RSP	Manoj Kumar Oraon	BJP	Leos Kujur
Alipurduar	11	Kalchini (ST)	AITC	Wilson Champramary	INC	Avijit Narjinary	BJP	Bishal Lama
Alipurduar	12	Alipurduars	AITC	Sourav Chakraborty	INC	Biswa Ranjan Sarkar	BJP	Kushal Chatterjee
Alipurduar	13	Falakata (SC)	AITC	Anil Adhikari	CPI(M)	Kshitish Chandra Ray	BJP	Narayan Chandra Mondal
Alipurduar	14	Madarihat (ST)	AITC	Padam Lama	RSP	Kumari Kujur	BJP	Manoj Tigga
Jalpaiguri	15	Dhupguri (SC)	AITC	Mitali Roy	CPI(M)	Mamata Roy	BJP	Agun Roy
Jalpaiguri	16	Maynaguri (SC)	AITC	Ananta Deb Adhikari	RSP	Chhaya Dey	BJP	Biswajit Roy
Jalpaiguri	17	Jalpaiguri (SC)	AITC	Dhartimohan Roy	INC	Sukhbilas Barma	BJP	Tapan Roy
Jalpaiguri	18	Rajganj (SC)	AITC	Khageswar Roy	CPI(M)	Satyendra Nath Mondal	BJP	Prakash Chandra Roy
Jalpaiguri	19	Dabgram-Phulbari	AITC	Goutam Deb	CPI(M)	Dilip Singh	BJP	Rathindra Bose
Jalpaiguri	20	Mal (ST)	AITC	Bulu Chik Baraik	CPI(M)	Augustus Kerketta	BJP	Mahesh Bagey
Jalpaiguri	21	Nagrakata (ST)	AITC	Sukra Munda	INC	Joseph Munda	BJP	John Barla
Kalimpong	22	Kalimpong	JAP	Harka Bahadur Chhetri	CPRM	Kishore Pradhan	GJM	Sarita Rai
Darjeeling	23	Darjeeling	AITC	Sharda Rai Subba	CPRM	Govind Chhetri	GJM	Amar Singh Rai
Darjeeling	24	Kurseong	AITC	Shanta Chhetri	CPRM	Arun Kumar Ghatani	GJM	Rohit Sharma
Darjeeling	25	Matigara-Naxalbari (SC)	AITC	Amar Sinha	INC	Shankar Malakar	BJP	Anandamoy Barman
Darjeeling	26	Siliguri	AITC	Bhaichung Bhutia	CPI(M)	Ashok Bhattacharya	BJP	Gita Chatterjee
Darjeeling	27	Phansidewa (ST)	AITC	Carolus Lakra	INC	Sunil Chandra Tirkey	BJP	Durga Murmu
Uttar Dinajpur	28	Chopra	AITC	Hamidul Rahman	CPI(M)	Akramul Hoque	BJP	Sajen Ram Singha
Uttar Dinajpur	29	Islampur	AITC	Abdul Karim Chowdhury	INC	Kanaia Lal Agarwal	BJP	Saumya Roop Mandal
Uttar Dinajpur	30	Goalpokhar	AITC	Ghulam Rabbani	INC	Afjal Hosen	BJP	Debashis Sarkar
Uttar Dinajpur	31	Chakulia	AITC	Alema Noorie	AIFB	Ali Imran Ramz	BJP	Ashim Kumar Mridha
Uttar Dinajpur	32	Karandighi	AITC	Manodeb Sinha	AIFB	Gokul Roy	BJP	Abdul Jalil
Uttar Dinajpur	33	Hemtabad (SC)	AITC	Sabita Kshetry	CPI(M)	Debendra Nath Roy	BJP	Bhanu Ram Barman
Uttar Dinajpur	34	Kaliaganj (SC)	AITC	Basanta Roy	INC	Pramatha Nath Ray	BJP	Rupak Roy
Uttar Dinajpur	35	Raiganj	AITC	Purnendu Dey	INC	Mohit Sengupta	BJP	Pradip Sarkar
Uttar Dinajpur	36	Itahar	AITC	Amal Acharjee	CPI	Srikumar Mukherjee	BJP	Yunish Hoque
Dakshin Dinajpur	37	Kushmandi (SC)	AITC	Rekha Roy	RSP	Narmada Chandra Roy	BJP	Ranjit Kumar Roy
Dakshin Dinajpur	38	Kumarganj	AITC	Toraf Hossain Mandal	CPI(M)	Mafuja Khatun	BJP	Manas Sarkar
Dakshin Dinajpur	39	Balurghat	AITC	Shankar Chakraborty	RSP	Biswanath Chowdhury	BJP	Gautam Chakraborty
Dakshin Dinajpur	40	Tapan (ST)	AITC	Bachchu Hansda	RSP	Raghu Urow	BJP	Krishna Kujur
Dakshin Dinajpur	41	Gangarampur (SC)	AITC	Satyendra Nath Ray	INC	Goutam Das	BJP	Sanatan Karmakar
Dakshin Dinajpur	42	Harirampur	AITC	Biplab Mitra	CPI(M)	Rafikul Islam	BJP	Phani Bhushan Mahata
Malda	43	Habibpur (ST)	AITC	Amal Kisku	CPI(M)	Khagen Murmu	BJP	Pradip Baskey
Malda	44	Gazole (SC)	AITC	Sushil Chandra Roy	CPI(M)	Dipali Biswas	BJP	Sudhangshu Sarkar
Malda	45	Chanchal	AITC	Soumitra Ray	INC	Asif Mehbub	BJP	Dipankar Ram
Malda	46	Harishchandrapur	AITC	Tajmul Hossain	INC	Mostaque Alam	BJP	Sanvarlal Kedia
Malda	46	Harishchandrapur	AITC	Tajmul Hossain	AIFB	Alam Mohammad Rafiqul	BJP	Sanvarlal Kedia
Malda	47	Malatipur	AITC	Moazzem Hossain	INC	Alberuni Zulkarnain	BJP	Saumitra Sarkar
Malda	47	Malatipur	AITC	Moazzem Hossain	RSP	Abdur Rahim Bakshi	BJP	Saumitra Sarkar
Malda	48	Ratua	AITC	Shehnaz Quadery	INC	Samar Mukherjee	BJP	Sanjay Saha
Malda	49	Manikchak	AITC	Sabitri Mitra	INC	Mottakin Alam	BJP	Shibendu Shekhar Roy
Malda	50	Maldaha	AITC	Dulal Sarkar	INC	Bhupendra Nath Halder	BJP	Gopal Chandra Saha
Malda	51	English Bazar	AITC	Krishnendu Choudhury	IND	Nihar Ranjan Ghosh	BJP	Suman Banerjee
Malda	52	Mothabari	AITC	Mohammad Nazrul Islam	INC	Sabina Yeasmin	BJP	Shyam Chand Ghosh
Malda	53	Sujapur	AITC	Abu Nasar Khan	INC	Isha Khan Choudhury	BJP	Nandan Kumar Ghosh
Malda	54	Baisnabnagar	AITC	Asit Bose	INC	Azizul Haque	BJP	Swadhin Kumar Sarkar
Murshidabad	55	Farakka	AITC	Mohammad Mustafa	INC	Mainul Haque	BJP	Indranath Upadhyay
Murshidabad	56	Samserganj	AITC	Amirul Islam	CPI(M)	Touab Ali	BJP	Milan Ghosh
Murshidabad	57	Suti	AITC	Emani Biswas	INC	Humayun Reza	BJP	Samrat Ghosh
Murshidabad	57	Suti	AITC	Emani Biswas	RSP	Nezamuddin	BJP	Samrat Ghosh
Murshidabad	58	Jangipur	AITC	Jakir Hossain	CPI(M)	Somnath Singha Ray	BJP	Sudhan Kumar Das
Murshidabad	58	Jangipur	AITC	Jakir Hossain	INC	Mohammad Sohrab	BJP	Sudhan Kumar Das
Murshidabad	59	Raghunathganj	AITC	Abul Kasem Molla	INC	Akhruzzaman	BJP	Golam Modashbar
Murshidabad	59	Raghunathganj	AITC	Abul Kasem Molla	RSP	Abul Hasnat	BJP	Golam Modashbar
Murshidabad	60	Sagardighi	AITC	Subrata Saha	INC	Aminul Islam	BJP	Debsharan Ghosh
Murshidabad	60	Sagardighi	AITC	Subrata Saha	CPI(M)	Rajab Ali Mallick	BJP	Debsharan Ghosh
Murshidabad	61	Lalgola	AITC	Chand Mohammad	INC	Abu Hena	BJP	Amar Kumar Das
Murshidabad	62	Bhagabangola	AITC	Abu Sufian Sarkar	CPI(M)	Mahasin Ali	BJP	Mehebub Alam
Murshidabad	63	Raninagar	AITC	Humayun Kabir	INC	Firoza Begam	BJP	Basu Basak
Murshidabad	64	Murshidabad	AITC	Ashim Krishna Bhatta	INC	Shaoni Singha Roy	BJP	Gouri Shankar Ghosh
Murshidabad	64	Murshidabad	AITC	Ashim Krishna Bhatta	AIFB	Bivas Chakraborty	BJP	Gouri Shankar Ghosh
Murshidabad	65	Nabagram (SC)	AITC	Dilip Saha	CPI(M)	Kanai Chandra Mondal	BJP	Sushanta Marjit
Murshidabad	66	Khargram (SC)	AITC	Madhab Chandra Marjit	INC	Ashish Marjit	BJP	Sumanta Mondal
Murshidabad	67	Burwan (SC)	AITC	Shasthi Charan Mal	INC	Protima Rajak	BJP	Amiya Kumar Das
Murshidabad	67	Burwan (SC)	AITC	Shasthi Charan Mal	RSP	Binoy Sarkar	BJP	Amiya Kumar Das
Murshidabad	68	Kandi	AITC	Santanu Sen	INC	Apurba Sarkar	BJP	Binay Bhushan Das
Murshidabad	69	Bharatpur	AITC	Khadem Dastagir	INC	Kamalesh Chatterjee	BJP	Iman Kalyan Mukherjee
Murshidabad	69	Bharatpur	AITC	Khadem Dastagir	RSP	Id Mohammad	BJP	Iman Kalyan Mukherjee
Murshidabad	70	Rejinagar	AITC	Begum Siddika	INC	Rabiul Alam Chowdhury	BJP	Bankim Karmakar
Murshidabad	71	Beldanga	AITC	Golam Kibria Mia	INC	Sheikh Safiujjaman	BJP	Alok Ghosh
Murshidabad	72	Baharampur	AITC	Sujata Banerjee	INC	Manoj Chakraborty	BJP	Mala Bhattacharya
Murshidabad	73	Hariharpara	AITC	Niamot Sheikh	INC	Alamgir Mir Palash	BJP	Tulsi Prasad Sukul
Murshidabad	73	Hariharpara	AITC	Niamot Sheikh	CPI(M)	Insar Ali Biswas	BJP	Tulsi Prasad Sukul
Murshidabad	74	Naoda	AITC	Masud Karim	INC	Abu Taher Khan	BJP	Sajal Bhaumik
Murshidabad	74	Naoda	AITC	Masud Karim	RSP	Abdul Bari Molla	BJP	Sajal Bhaumik
Murshidabad	75	Domkal	AITC	Soumik Hossain	CPI(M)	Anisur Rahman	BJP	Nanda Dulal Pal
Murshidabad	75	Domkal	AITC	Soumik Hossain	INC	Abdur Rahaman Sheikh	BJP	Nanda Dulal Pal
Murshidabad	76	Jalangi	AITC	Alok Das	CPI(M)	Abdur Razzak	BJP	Chandan Mondal
Nadia	77	Karimpur	AITC	Mahua Moitra	CPI(M)	Samarendranath Ghosh	BJP	Subhasis Bhattacharya
Nadia	78	Tehatta	AITC	Gouri Shankar Dutta	CPI(M)	Ranjit Kumar Mandal	BJP	Arjun Kumar Biswas
Nadia	79	Palashipara	AITC	Tapas Kumar Saha	CPI(M)	S. M. Saadi	BJP	Bibhas Mondal
Nadia	80	Kaliganj	AITC	Nasiruddin Ahamed	INC	Hasanuzzaman Sheikh	BJP	Saikat Sarkar
Nadia	81	Nakashipara	AITC	Kallol Khan	CPI(M)	Tanmay Ganguly	BJP	Anup Kumar Mondal
Nadia	82	Chapra	AITC	Rukbanur Rahman	CPI(M)	Shamsul Islam Mollah	BJP	Sutirtha Chakraborty
Nadia	83	Krishnanagar Uttar	AITC	Abani Mohan Joardar	INC	Ashim Kumar Saha	BJP	Chanchal Kumar Biswas
Nadia	84	Nabadwip	AITC	Pundarikakshya Saha	CPI(M)	Sumit Biswas	BJP	Gautam Pal
Nadia	85	Krishnanagar Dakshin	AITC	Ujjal Biswas	CPI(M)	Meghlal Sheikh	BJP	Mahadev Sarkar
Nadia	86	Santipur	AITC	Ajoy Dey	INC	Arindam Bhattacharya	BJP	Swapan Kumar Dam
Nadia	87	Ranaghat Uttar Paschim	AITC	Parthasarathi Chatterjee	INC	Shankar Singha	BJP	Anal Biswas
Nadia	88	Krishnaganj (SC)	AITC	Satyajit Biswas	CPI(M)	Mrinal Biswas	BJP	Sujit Kumar Biswas
Nadia	89	Ranaghat Uttar Purba (SC)	AITC	Samir Kumar Poddar	CPI(M)	Babusona Sarkar	BJP	Nikhil Ranjan Sarkar
Nadia	90	Ranaghat Dakshin (SC)	AITC	Abir Ranjan Biswas	CPI(M)	Rama Biswas	BJP	Susmit Ranjan Haldar
Nadia	91	Chakdaha	AITC	Ratna Ghosh Kar	CPI(M)	Biswanath Gupta	BJP	Pradip Kumar Sarkar
Nadia	92	Kalyani (SC)	AITC	Ramendra Nath Biswas	CPI(M)	Alokesh Das	BJP	Ranajit Kumar Biswas
Nadia	93	Haringhata (SC)	AITC	Nilima Nag Mallick	CPI(M)	Ajoy Das	BJP	Suresh Sikdar
North 24 Parganas	94	Bagdah (SC)	AITC	Upendranath Biswas	INC	Dulal Chandra Bar	BJP	Biva Majumdar
North 24 Parganas	95	Bongaon Uttar (SC)	AITC	Biswajit Das	AIFB	Sushanta Bowali	BJP	K. D. Biswas
North 24 Parganas	96	Bongaon Dakshin (SC)	AITC	Surajit Kumar Biswas	CPI(M)	Ramendranath Audhya	BJP	Swapan Majumder
North 24 Parganas	97	Gaighata (SC)	AITC	Pulin Bihari Ray	CPI	Kapil Krishna Thakur	BJP	Shankar Thakur
North 24 Parganas	98	Swarupnagar (SC)	AITC	Bina Mondal	CPI(M)	Dhiman Sarkar	BJP	Mihir Kumar Bagchi
North 24 Parganas	99	Baduria						
North 24 Parganas	100	Habra						
North 24 Parganas	101	Ashokenagar						
North 24 Parganas	102	Amdanga						
North 24 Parganas	103	Bijpur						
North 24 Parganas	104	Naihati						
North 24 Parganas	105	Bhatpara						
North 24 Parganas	106	Jagatdal						
North 24 Parganas	107	Noapara						
North 24 Parganas	108	Barrackpur						
North 24 Parganas	109	Khardaha						
North 24 Parganas	110	Dum Dum Uttar						
North 24 Parganas	111	Panihati						
North 24 Parganas	112	Kamarhati						
North 24 Parganas	113	Baranagar						
North 24 Parganas	114	Dum Dum						
North 24 Parganas	115	Rajarhat New Town						
North 24 Parganas	116	Bidhannagar						
North 24 Parganas	117	Rajarhat Gopalpur						
North 24 Parganas	118	Madhyamgram						
North 24 Parganas	119	Barasat						
North 24 Parganas	120	Deganga						
North 24 Parganas	121	Haroa						
North 24 Parganas	122	Minakhan (SC)						
North 24 Parganas	123	Sandeshkhali (ST)						
North 24 Parganas	124	Basirhat Dakshin						
North 24 Parganas	125	Basirhat Uttar						
North 24 Parganas	126	Hingalganj (SC)						
South 24 Parganas	127	Gosaba (SC)						
South 24 Parganas	128	Basanti (SC)						
South 24 Parganas	129	Kultali (SC)						
South 24 Parganas	130	Patharpratima						
South 24 Parganas	131	Kakdwip						
South 24 Parganas	132	Sagar						
South 24 Parganas	133	Kulpi						
South 24 Parganas	134	Raidighi						
South 24 Parganas	135	Mandirbazar (SC)						
South 24 Parganas	136	Jaynagar (SC)						
South 24 Parganas	137	Baruipur Purba (SC)						
South 24 Parganas	138	Canning Paschim (SC)						
South 24 Parganas	139	Canning Purba						
South 24 Parganas	140	Baruipur Paschim						
South 24 Parganas	141	Magrahat Purba (SC)						
South 24 Parganas	142	Magrahat Paschim						
South 24 Parganas	143	Diamond Harbour						
South 24 Parganas	144	Falta						
South 24 Parganas	145	Satgachia						
South 24 Parganas	146	Bishnupur (SC)						
South 24 Parganas	147	Sonarpur Dakshin						
South 24 Parganas	148	Bhangar						
South 24 Parganas	149	Kasba						
South 24 Parganas	150	Jadavpur						
South 24 Parganas	151	Sonarpur Uttar						
South 24 Parganas	152	Tollygunge						
South 24 Parganas	153	Behala Purba						
South 24 Parganas	154	Behala Paschim						
South 24 Parganas	155	Maheshtala						
South 24 Parganas	156	Budge Budge						
South 24 Parganas	157	Metiaburuz						
Kolkata	158	Kolkata Port						
Kolkata	159	Bhabanipur						
Kolkata	160	Rashbehari						
Kolkata	161	Ballygunge						
Kolkata	162	Chowrangee						
Kolkata	163	Entally						
Kolkata	164	Beleghata						
Kolkata	165	Jorasanko						
Kolkata	166	Shyampukur						
Kolkata	167	Maniktala						
Kolkata	168	Kashipur-Belgachhia						
Howrah	169	Bally						
Howrah	170	Howrah Uttar						
Howrah	171	Howrah Madhya						
Howrah	172	Shibpur						
Howrah	173	Howrah Dakshin						
Howrah	174	Sankrail (SC)						
Howrah	175	Panchla						
Howrah	176	Uluberia Purba						
Howrah	177	Uluberia Uttar (SC)						
Howrah	178	Uluberia Dakshin						
Howrah	179	Shyampur						
Howrah	180	Bagnan						
Howrah	181	Amta						
Howrah	182	Udaynarayanpur						
Howrah	183	Jagatballavpur						
Howrah	184	Domjur						
Hooghly	185	Uttarpara						
Hooghly	186	Sreerampur						
Hooghly	187	Champdani						
Hooghly	188	Singur						
Hooghly	189	Chandannagar						
Hooghly	190	Chunchura						
Hooghly	191	Balagarh (SC)						
Hooghly	192	Pandua						
Hooghly	193	Saptagram						
Hooghly	194	Chanditala						
Hooghly	195	Jangipara						
Hooghly	196	Haripal						
Hooghly	197	Dhanekhali (SC)						
Hooghly	198	Tarakeswar						
Hooghly	199	Pursurah						
Hooghly	200	Arambagh (SC)						
Hooghly	201	Goghat (SC)						
Hooghly	202	Khanakul						
Purba Medinipur	203	Tamluk						
Purba Medinipur	204	Panskura Purba						
Purba Medinipur	205	Panskura Paschim						
Purba Medinipur	206	Moyna						
Purba Medinipur	207	Nandakumar						
Purba Medinipur	208	Mahisadal						
Purba Medinipur	209	Haldia (SC)						
Purba Medinipur	210	Nandigram						
Purba Medinipur	211	Chandipur						
Purba Medinipur	212	Patashpur						
Purba Medinipur	213	Kanthi Uttar						
Purba Medinipur	214	Bhagabanpur						
Purba Medinipur	215	Khejuri (SC)						
Purba Medinipur	216	Kanthi Dakshin						
Purba Medinipur	217	Ramnagar						
Purba Medinipur	218	Egra						
Paschim Medinipur	219	Dantan						
Jhargram	220	Nayagram (ST)						
Jhargram	221	Gopiballavpur						
Jhargram	222	Jhargram						
Paschim Medinipur	223	Keshiary (ST)						
Paschim Medinipur	224	Kharagpur Sadar						
Paschim Medinipur	225	Narayangarh						
Paschim Medinipur	226	Sabang						
Paschim Medinipur	227	Pingla						
Paschim Medinipur	228	Kharagpur						
Paschim Medinipur	229	Debra						
Paschim Medinipur	230	Daspur						
Paschim Medinipur	231	Ghatal						
Paschim Medinipur	232	Chandrakona (SC)						
Paschim Medinipur	233	Garbeta						
Paschim Medinipur	234	Salboni						
Paschim Medinipur	235	Keshpur						
Paschim Medinipur	236	Medinipur						
Jhargram	237	Binpur (ST)						
Purulia	238	Bandwan (ST)						
Purulia	239	Balarampur						
Purulia	240	Baghmundi						
Purulia	241	Joypur						
Purulia	242	Purulia						
Purulia	243	Manbazar (ST)						
Purulia	244	Kashipur						
Purulia	245	Para (SC)						
Purulia	246	Raghunathpur (SC)						
Bankura	247	Saltora (SC)						
Bankura	248	Chhatna						
Bankura	249	Ranibandh (ST)						
Bankura	250	Raipur (ST)						
Bankura	251	Taldangra						
Bankura	252	Bankura						
Bankura	253	Barjora						
Bankura	254	Onda						
Bankura	255	Bishnupur						
Bankura	256	Katulpur (SC)						
Bankura	257	Indas (SC)						
Bankura	258	Sonamukhi (SC)						
Purba Bardhaman	259	Khandaghosh (SC)						
Purba Bardhaman	260	Bardhaman Dakshin						
Purba Bardhaman	261	Raina (SC)						
Purba Bardhaman	262	Jamalpur (SC)						
Purba Bardhaman	263	Monteswar						
Purba Bardhaman	264	Kalna (SC)						
Purba Bardhaman	265	Memari						
Purba Bardhaman	266	Bardhaman Uttar (SC)						
Purba Bardhaman	267	Bhatar						
Purba Bardhaman	268	Purbasthali Dakshin						
Purba Bardhaman	269	Purbasthali Uttar						
Purba Bardhaman	270	Katwa						
Purba Bardhaman	271	Ketugram						
Purba Bardhaman	272	Mangalkot						
Purba Bardhaman	273	Ausgram (SC)						
Purba Bardhaman	274	Galsi (SC)						
Paschim Bardhaman	275	Pandabeswar						
Paschim Bardhaman	276	Durgapur Purba						
Paschim Bardhaman	277	Durgapur Paschim						
Paschim Bardhaman	278	Raniganj						
Paschim Bardhaman	279	Jamuria						
Paschim Bardhaman	280	Asansol Dakshin						
Paschim Bardhaman	281	Asansol Uttar						
Paschim Bardhaman	282	Kulti						
Paschim Bardhaman	283	Barabani						
Birbhum	284	Dubrajpur (SC)						
Birbhum	285	Suri						
Birbhum	286	Bolpur						
Birbhum	287	Nanoor (SC)						
Birbhum	288	Labpur						
Birbhum	289	Sainthia (SC)						
Birbhum	290	Mayureswar						
Birbhum	291	Rampurhat						
Birbhum	292	Hansan	AITC	Asit Kumar Mal	INC	Milton Rashid	BJP	Ruparani Mondal
Birbhum	293	Nalhati	AITC	Moinuddin Shams	AIFB	Dipak Chatterjee	BJP	Anil Singh
Birbhum	294	Murarai	AITC	Abdur Rahaman Liton	INC	Ali Mortuza Khan	BJP	Hayatunninsh Bibi

== Voting ==
79.22% voting was recorded in the third phase of West Bengal polls held on 21 April 2016. 79.51% voting was recorded in second phase of West Bengal polls.

== Surveys and polls ==
=== Exit poll ===
Polling Agency				
Polling Agency	AITC	Mahajot	NDA	Others
ABP News–Nielsen	163	126	1	4
India Today-Axis	243	44	4	3
Times Now–CVoter	167	120	4	3
News 24–Today's Chanakya	210	70	14	–
NDTV	184	103	5	2
BRACE-News Time-খবর ৩৬৫ দিন	214	72	3	5

== Result ==
=== Results by Parties ===
The election results were announced along with other four state assemblies on 19 May 2016. AITC won 211 seats, and thus was reelected with an enhanced majority. They also became the first ruling party to win without an ally since 1962 in West Bengal.

Vote share by alliance
1. AITC+ (44.9%)
2. Mahajot (39.2%)
3. NDA (10.7%)
4. NOTA (1.52%)
5. IND (1.49%)
6. Others (2.26%)
Vote share by Party
1. AITC (44.9%)
2. INC (12.2%)
3. CPI(M) (19.8%)
4. BJP (10.2%)
5. AIFB (2.82%)
6. IND (2.16%)
7. RSP (1.67%)
8. CPI (1.45%)
9. GJM (0.47%)
10. DSP (0.31%)
11. NCP (0.13%)
12. SP (0.08%)
13. RJD (0.03%)
14. NOTA (1.52%)
15. Others (2.29%)

Parties and coalitions	2016 West Bengal Bidhan Sabha Election			Seats		
Parties and coalitions	Votes	%	±pp	Contested	Won	+/−
All India Trinamool Congress (AITC)	24,564,523	44.91	▲	293	211	▲27
Communist Party of India (Marxist) (CPM)	10,802,058	19.75	▼	148	26	▼14
Indian National Congress (INC)	6,700,938	12.25	▲	92	44	▲2
Bharatiya Janata Party (BJP)	5,555,134	10.16	▲	291	3	▲3
All India Forward Bloc (AIFB)	1,543,764	2.82	▼1.98	25	2	▼9
Independents (IND)	1,184,047	2.16	▼0.97	371	1	▼1
Revolutionary Socialist Party (RSP)	911,004	1.67	▼1.33	19	3	▼4
Communist Party of India (CPI)	791,925	1.45	▼0.35	11	1	▼1
Socialist Unity Centre of India (SUCI)	365,996	0.67	▲0.23	182	0	▼1
Gorkha Janmukti Morcha (GOJAM)	254,626	0.47	▼0.25	5	3	Steady
Democratic Socialist Party (DSP)	167,576	0.31	▼0.04	2	0	▼1
Nationalist Congress Party (NCP)	69,898	0.13	▲0.10	1	0	Steady
Samajwadi Party (SP)	46,402	0.08	▼0.66	23	0	▼1
Rashtriya Janata Dal (RJD)	15,439	0.03	▼0.02	1	0	Steady
None of the Above (NOTA)	831,848	1.52	▲1.52			
Total	54,697,791	100.0		2255	294	±0
Valid votes	54,697,791	99.92				
Invalid votes	44,622	0.08				
Votes cast / turnout	54,742,413	83.02				
Abstentions	11,196,593	16.98				
Registered voters	65,939,006					

=== Results by polling phase ===
Phase	Seats				
Phase	Seats	AITC	SDA	NDA	Others
First A	18	16	2	0	0
First B	31	20	10	1	0
Second	56	25	26	5	0
Third	62	38	24	0	0
Fourth	49	42	7	0	0
Fifth	53	49	4	0	0
Sixth	25	21	4	0	0
Total	294	211	77	6	0

=== Results by region ===
Region	District	Seats								
Region	District	Seats	AITC		SDA		NDA		Others	
Region	District	Seats	Won	±	Won	±	Won	±	Won	±
North Bengal	Cooch Behar	9	8	▲3	1	▼3	0	Steady	0	Steady
North Bengal	Alipurduar	5	4	▲2	0	▼2	1	Steady	0	Steady
North Bengal	Jalpaiguri	7	6	▲2	1	▼2	0	Steady	0	Steady
North Bengal	Darjeeling	6	0	▼3	3	▲3	3	Steady	0	Steady
North Bengal	Uttar Dinajpur	9	4	▼1	5	▲2	0	Steady	0	▼1
North Bengal	Dakshin Dinajpur	6	2	▼3	4	▲3	0	Steady	0	Steady
North Bengal	Malda	12	0	▼9	11	▲8	1	▲1	0	Steady
Total		54	24	▼9	25	▲9	5	▲1	0	▼1
South Bengal	Murshidabad	22	4	▼11	18	▲11	0	Steady	0	Steady
South Bengal	Nadia	17	13	▼1	4	▲1	0	Steady	0	Steady
South Bengal	North 24 Parganas	33	27	▼2	6	▲2	0	Steady	0	Steady
South Bengal	South 24 Parganas	31	29	▲2	2	▼2	0	Steady	0	Steady
South Bengal	Kolkata	11	11	Steady	0	Steady	0	Steady	0	Steady
South Bengal	Howrah	16	15	▼1	1	▲1	0	Steady	0	Steady
South Bengal	Hooghly	18	16	Steady	2	Steady	0	Steady	0	Steady
South Bengal	Purba Medinipur	16	13	▼3	3	▲3	0	Steady	0	Steady
South Bengal	Paschim Medinipur	19	17	▲7	1	▼8	1	▲1	0	Steady
Total		183	145	▼9	37	▲8	1	▲1	0	Steady
Rarh Banga	Purulia	9	7	Steady	2	Steady	0	Steady	0	Steady
Rarh Banga	Bankura	12	7	▼1	5	▲1	0	Steady	0	Steady
Rarh Banga	Bardhaman	25	19	▲4	6	▼4	0	Steady	0	Steady
Rarh Banga	Birbhum	11	9	▲1	2	▼1	0	Steady	0	Steady
Total		57	42	▲4	15	▼4	0	Steady	0	Steady
Total		294	211	▼14	77	▲13	6 (Note: NDA won 6 seats: BJP won 3 seats and its ally GJM won 3 seats.)	▲2	0	▼1

=== Constituency wise results ===
District	Constituency		Winner				Runner-up				Margin	
District	Constituency		Candidate	Party	Votes	%	Candidate	Party	Votes	%	Votes	%
Cooch Behar	1	Mekliganj (SC)	Arghya Roy Pradhan (Bilu)	AITC	74,823	41.35	Paresh Chandra Adhikary	AIFB	68,186	37.68	6,637	3.67
Cooch Behar	2	Mathabhanga (SC)	Binay Krishna Barman	AITC	96,383	48.10	Khagen Chandra Barman	CPI(M)	64,465	32.17	31,918	15.93
Cooch Behar	3	Cooch Behar Uttar (SC)	Nagendra Nath Roy	AIFB	97,629	43.63	Parimal Barman	AITC	85,336	38.14	12,293	5.49
Cooch Behar	4	Cooch Behar Dakshin	Mihir Goswami	AITC	82,849	46.24	Debasis Banik	AIFB	64,654	36.08	18,195	10.16
Cooch Behar	5	Sitalkuchi (SC)	Hiten Barman	AITC	1,01,647	44.18	Namadipti Adhikary	CPI(M)	86,164	37.45	15,483	6.73
Cooch Behar	6	Sitai (SC)	Jagadish Chandra Barma Basunia	AITC	1,03,410	47.39	Keshab Chandra Ray	INC	78,159	35.82	25,251	11.57
Cooch Behar	7	Dinhata	Udayan Guha	AITC	1,00,732	45.04	Akshay Thakur	AIFB	78,939	35.30	21,793	9.74
Cooch Behar	8	Natabari	Rabindra Nath Ghosh	AITC	93,257	46.72	Tamser Ali	CPI(M)	77,100	38.63	16,157	8.09
Cooch Behar	9	Tufanganj	Fazal Karim Miah	AITC	85,052	44.21	Shyamal Choudhury	INC	69,782	36.27	15,270	7.94
Alipurduar	10	Kumargram (ST)	James Kujur	AITC	77,668	37.27	Manoj Kumar Oraon	RSP	71,515	34.32	6,153	2.95
Alipurduar	11	Kalchini (ST)	Wilson Champramary	AITC	62,061	34.99	Bishal Lama	BJP	60,550	34.14	1,511	0.85
Alipurduar	12	Alipurduars	Sourav Chakraborty (Ghutish)	AITC	89,695	44.09	Biswa Ranjan Sarkar	INC	77,737	38.21	11,958	5.88
Alipurduar	13	Falakata (SC)	Anil Adhikari	AITC	86,647	43.77	Kshitish Chandra Ray	CPI(M)	69,808	35.27	16,839	8.50
Alipurduar	14	Madarihat (ST)	Manoj Tigga	BJP	66,989	43.98	Padam Lama	AITC	44,951	29.51	22,038	14.47
Jalpaiguri	15	Dhupguri (SC)	Mitali Roy	AITC	90,781	43.49	Mamata Roy	CPI(M)	71,517	34.26	19,264	9.23
Jalpaiguri	16	Maynaguri (SC)	Ananta Deb Adhikari	AITC	1,00,837	47.85	Chhaya Dey (Roy)	RSP	65,930	31.29	34,907	16.56
Jalpaiguri	17	Jalpaiguri (SC)	Sukhbilas Barma	INC	94,553	45.41	Dharttimohan Roy	AITC	89,396	42.93	5,157	2.48
Jalpaiguri	18	Rajganj (SC)	Khageswar Roy	AITC	89,785	46.15	Satyendra Nath Mondal	CPI(M)	75,108	38.61	14,677	7.54
Jalpaiguri	19	Dabgram-Fulbari	Goutam Deb	AITC	1,05,769	47.49	Dilip Singh	CPI(M)	81,958	36.80	23,811	10.69
Jalpaiguri	20	Mal (ST)	Bulu Chik Baraik	AITC	84,877	44.28	Augustus Kerketta	CPI(M)	66,415	34.65	18,462	9.63
Jalpaiguri	21	Nagrakata (ST)	Sukra Munda	AITC	57,306	32.46	Joseph Munda	INC	54,078	30.63	3,228	1.83
Kalimpong	22	Kalimpong	Sarita Rai	GJM	67,693	49.06	Harka Bahadur Chettri	IND	56,262	40.77	11,431	8.29
Darjeeling	23	Darjeeling	Amar Singh Rai	GJM	95,386	59.85	Sarda Rai Subba	AITC	45,473	28.53	49,913	31.32
Darjeeling	24	Kurseong	Rohit Sharma	GJM	86,947	53.03	Shanta Chhetri	AITC	53,221	32.46	33,726	20.57
Darjeeling	25	Matigara-Naxalbari (SC)	Sankar Malakar	INC	86,441	41.28	Amar Sinha	AITC	67,814	32.39	18,627	8.89
Darjeeling	26	Siliguri	Asok Bhattacharya	CPI(M)	78,054	46.36	Bhaichung Bhutia	AITC	63,982	38.01	14,072	8.35
Darjeeling	27	Phansidewa (ST)	Sunil Chandra Tirkey	INC	73,158	40.36	Carolus Lakra	AITC	66,084	36.45	7,074	3.91
Uttar Dinajpur	28	Chopra	Hamidul Rahaman	AITC	74,390	41.82	Akramul Hoque	CPI(M)	57,530	32.34	16,860	9.48
Uttar Dinajpur	29	Islampur	Kanaia Lal Agarwal	INC	65,559	43.88	Abdul Karim Chowdhary	AITC	57,841	38.71	7,718	5.17
Uttar Dinajpur	30	Goalpokhar	Md Gulam Rabbani	AITC	64,869	43.91	Afjal Hosen	INC	57,121	38.67	7,748	5.24
Uttar Dinajpur	31	Chakulia	Ali Imran Ramz	AIFB	64,185	42.65	Ashim Kumar Mridha	BJP	36,656	24.36	27,529	18.29
Uttar Dinajpur	32	Karandighi	Manodeb Sinha	AITC	54,599	29.44	Gokul Roy	AIFB	51,367	27.69	3,232	1.75
Uttar Dinajpur	33	Hemtabad (SC)	Debendra Nath Roy	CPI(M)	80,419	40.67	Sabita Kshetry	AITC	67,283	34.03	13,136	6.64
Uttar Dinajpur	34	Kaliaganj (SC)	Pramatha Nath Ray	INC	1,12,868	52.58	Basanta Roy	AITC	66,266	30.87	46,602	21.71
Uttar Dinajpur	35	Raiganj	Mohit Sengupta	INC	87,983	58.98	Purnendu Dey (Bablu)	AITC	36,736	24.63	51,247	34.35
Uttar Dinajpur	36	Itahar	Amal Acharjee	AITC	88,507	52.26	Srikumar Mukherjee	CPI	69,387	40.97	19,120	11.29
Dakshin Dinajpur	37	Kushmandi (SC)	Narmada Chandra Roy	RSP	68,965	42.18	Rekha Roy	AITC	65,436	40.02	3,529	2.16
Dakshin Dinajpur	38	Kumarganj	Toraf Hossain Mandal	AITC	64,501	41.88	Mafuja Khatun	CPI(M)	61,005	39.61	3,496	2.27
Dakshin Dinajpur	39	Balurghat	Biswanath Choudhury	RSP	60,590	42.82	Chakravorti Shankar	AITC	59,140	41.79	1,450	1.03
Dakshin Dinajpur	40	Tapan (ST)	Bachchu Hansda	AITC	72,511	42.78	Urow Raghu	RSP	68,110	40.19	4,401	2.59
Dakshin Dinajpur	41	Gangarampur (SC)	Goutam Das	INC	80,401	46.37	Satyendra Nath Roy	AITC	69,668	40.18	10,733	6.19
Dakshin Dinajpur	42	Harirampur	Rafikul Islam	CPI(M)	71,447	42.83	Biplab Mitra	AITC	66,943	40.13	4,504	2.70
Malda	43	Habibpur (ST)	Khagen Murmu	CPI(M)	64,095	34.76	Amal Kisku	AITC	61,583	33.40	2,512	1.36
Malda	44	Gazole (SC)	Dipali Biswas	CPI(M)	85,949	43.34	Sushil Chandra Roy	AITC	65,347	32.95	20,602	10.39
Malda	45	Chanchal	Asif Mehbub	INC	92,590	53.78	Soumitra Ray	AITC	40,222	23.36	52,368	30.42
Malda	46	Harischandrapur	Alam Mostaque	INC	60,047	34.90	Tajmul Hossain	AITC	42,190	24.52	17,857	10.38
Malda	47	Malatipur	Alberuni Zulkarnain	INC	50,643	32.27	Abdur Rahim Boxi	RSP	48,043	30.61	2,600	1.66
Malda	48	Ratua	Samar Mukherjee	INC	96,587	51.86	Shehnaz Quadery	AITC	53,312	28.62	43,275	23.24
Malda	49	Manickchak	Md. Mottakin Alam	INC	78,472	45.48	Sabitri Mitra	AITC	65,869	38.17	12,603	7.31
Malda	50	Maldaha (SC)	Bhupendra Nath Halder	INC	88,243	48.36	Dulal Sarkar (Babla)	AITC	54,934	30.10	33,309	18.26
Malda	51	Englishbazar	Nihar Ranjan Ghosh	IND	1,07,183	51.72	Krishnendu Narayan Choudhury	AITC	67,456	32.55	39,727	19.17
Malda	52	Mothabari	Yeasmin Sabina	INC	69,089	51.78	Md. Najrul Islam	AITC	30,915	23.17	38,174	28.61
Malda	53	Sujapur	Isha Khan Choudhury	INC	97,332	58.46	Abu Nasar Khan Choudhury	AITC	50,252	30.18	47,080	28.28
Malda	54	Baishnabnagar	Swadhin Kumar Sarkar	BJP	70,185	38.20	Azizul Haque	INC	65,688	35.75	4,497	2.45
Murshidabad	55	Farakka	Mainul Haque	INC	83,314	51.05	Md. Mustafa	AITC	55,147	33.79	28,167	17.26
Murshidabad	56	Samserganj	Amirul Islam	AITC	48,381	30.43	Touab Ali	CPI(M)	46,601	29.31	1,780	1.12
Murshidabad	57	Suti	Humayun Reza	INC	84,017	44.64	Emani Biswas	AITC	80,067	42.54	3,950	2.10
Murshidabad	58	Jangipur	Jakir Hossain	AITC	66,869	37.23	Somnath Singha Ray	CPI(M)	46,236	25.75	20,633	11.48
Murshidabad	59	Raghunathganj	Akhruzzaman	INC	78,497	47.26	Abul Kasem Molla	AITC	54,711	32.94	23,786	14.32
Murshidabad	60	Sagardighi	Subrata Saha	AITC	44,817	26.23	Aminul Islam	INC	39,603	23.18	5,214	3.05
Murshidabad	61	Lalgola	Abu Hena	INC	1,00,110	60.56	Chand Mohammad	AITC	46,635	28.21	53,475	32.35
Murshidabad	62	Bhagawangola	Mahasin Ali	CPI(M)	1,05,037	54.39	Abu Sufian Sarkar	AITC	68,732	35.59	36,305	18.80
Murshidabad	63	Raninagar	Firoza Begam (E)	INC	1,11,132	58.47	Dr. Humayun Kabir	AITC	62,750	33.01	48,382	25.46
Murshidabad	64	Murshidabad	Shaoni Singha Roy	INC	94,579	47.02	Ashim Krishna Bhatta	AITC	69,440	34.52	25,139	12.50
Murshidabad	65	Nabagram (SC)	Kanai Chandra Mondal	CPI(M)	99,545	54.78	Dilip Saha	AITC	61,102	33.63	38,443	21.15
Murshidabad	66	Khargram (SC)	Ashis Marjit	INC	88,913	54.93	Madhab Chandra Marjit	AITC	55,740	34.44	33,173	20.49
Murshidabad	67	Burwan (SC)	Protima Rajak	INC	55,906	36.89	Shasthi Charan Mal	AITC	40,904	26.99	15,002	9.90
Murshidabad	68	Kandi	Apurba Sarkar (David)	INC	81,723	51.22	Dr. Santanu Sen	AITC	60,943	38.20	20,780	13.02
Murshidabad	69	Bharatpur	Kamalesh Chatterjee (Gopal)	INC	59,789	36.18	Khadem A Dastegir (Khadu)	AITC	48,772	29.51	11,017	6.67
Murshidabad	70	Rejinagar	Rabiul Alam Chowdhury	INC	79,770	43.12	Humayun Kabir	IND	74,210	40.12	5,560	3.00
Murshidabad	71	Beldanga	Seikh Safiujjaman	INC	87,017	49.43	Golam Kibria Mia	AITC	56,736	32.23	30,281	17.20
Murshidabad	72	Baharampur	Manoj Chakraborty	INC	1,27,762	67.89	Dr. Sujata Banerjee	AITC	35,489	18.86	92,273	49.03
Murshidabad	73	Hariharpara	Niamot Sheikh	AITC	71,502	37.77	Alamgir Mir (Palash)	INC	66,499	35.13	5,003	2.64
Murshidabad	74	Nowda	Abu Taher Khan	INC	62,639	34.46	Masud Karim	AITC	43,377	23.87	19,262	10.59
Murshidabad	75	Domkal	Anisur Rahaman	CPI(M)	71,703	36.59	Soumik Hossain	AITC	64,813	33.07	6,890	3.52
Murshidabad	76	Jalangi	Abdur Razzak	CPI(M)	96,250	50.25	Alok Das	AITC	70,983	37.06	25,267	13.19
Nadia	77	Karimpur	Mahua Moitra	AITC	90,989	45.24	Samarendranath Ghosh	CPI(M)	75,000	37.29	15,989	7.95
Nadia	78	Tehatta	Dutta Gouri Sankar	AITC	97,611	49.04	Ranjit Kumar Mandal	CPI(M)	80,215	40.30	17,396	8.74
Nadia	79	Palashipara	Tapas Kumar Saha	AITC	82,127	44.99	S.M. Sadi	CPI(M)	76,568	41.94	5,559	3.05
Nadia	80	Kaliganj	Hasanuzzaman Sk	INC	85,125	45.65	Ahamed Nasiruddin (Lal)	AITC	83,898	44.99	1,227	0.66
Nadia	81	Nakashipara	Kallol Khan	AITC	88,032	46.56	Tanmay Ganguli	CPI(M)	81,782	43.25	6,250	3.31
Nadia	82	Chapra	Rukbanur Rahman	AITC	89,556	47.79	Shamsul Islam Mollah	CPI(M)	76,093	40.61	13,463	7.18
Nadia	83	Krishnanagar Uttar	Abani Mohan Joardar	AITC	82,864	44.14	Asim Kumar Saha	INC	69,949	37.26	12,915	6.88
Nadia	84	Nabadwip	Pundarikakshya Saha	AITC	1,02,228	52.49	Sumit Biswas	CPI(M)	66,432	34.11	35,796	18.38
Nadia	85	Krishnanagar Dakshin	Ujjal Biswas	AITC	80,711	45.58	Meghlal Sheikh	CPI(M)	67,897	38.35	12,814	7.23
Nadia	86	Santipur	Arindam Bhattacharya	INC	1,03,566	51.76	Ajoy Dey	AITC	84,078	42.02	19,488	9.74
Nadia	87	Ranaghat Uttar Paschim	Sankar Singha	INC	1,09,607	52.05	Parthasarathi Chatterjee (Babu)	AITC	86,187	40.93	23,420	11.12
Nadia	88	Krishnaganj (SC)	Satyajit Biswas	AITC	1,14,626	53.72	Mrinal Biswas (Mini)	CPI(M)	70,698	33.13	43,928	20.59
Nadia	89	Ranaghat Uttar Purba (SC)	Samir Kumar Poddar	AITC	93,215	48.13	Babusona Sarkar	CPI(M)	78,243	40.40	14,972	7.73
Nadia	90	Ranaghat Dakshin (SC)	Rama Biswas	CPI(M)	1,04,159	47.51	Abir Ranjan Biswas	AITC	86,906	39.64	17,253	7.87
Nadia	91	Chakdaha	Kar Ratna Ghosh	AITC	94,241	49.63	Biswanath Gupta	CPI(M)	70,588	37.17	23,653	12.46
Nadia	92	Kalyani (SC)	Dr. Ramendra Nath Biswas	AITC	95,795	50.47	Alakesh Das	CPI(M)	69,700	36.73	26,095	13.74
Nadia	93	Haringhata (SC)	Nilima Nag (Mallick)	AITC	94,530	49.40	Ajoy Das	CPI(M)	73,181	38.24	21,349	11.16
North 24 Parganas	94	Bagdah (SC)	Dulal Chandra Bar	INC	1,02,026	49.64	Upendra Nath Biswas	AITC	89,790	43.68	12,236	5.96
North 24 Parganas	95	Bongaon Uttar (SC)	Biswajit Das	AITC	95,822	50.59	Sushanta Bowali	AIFB	62,630	33.07	33,192	17.52
North 24 Parganas	96	Bongaon Dakshin (SC)	Surajit Kumar Biswas	AITC	92,379	49.20	Ramendranath Audhya	CPI(M)	65,475	34.87	26,904	14.33
North 24 Parganas	97	Gaighata (SC)	Pulin Bihari Ray	AITC	93,812	48.62	Kapil Krishna Thakur	CPI	64,240	33.29	29,572	15.33
North 24 Parganas	98	Swarupnagar (SC)	Bina Mandal	AITC	93,807	48.56	Dhiman Sarkar	CPI(M)	81,866	42.38	11,941	6.18
North 24 Parganas	99	Baduria	Abdur Rahim Quazi	INC	98,408	50.17	Amir Ali	AITC	76,163	38.83	22,245	11.34
North 24 Parganas	100	Habra	Jyoti Priya Mallick	AITC	1,01,590	54.31	Ashis Kantha Mukherjee	CPI(M)	55,643	29.75	45,947	24.56
North 24 Parganas	101	Ashoknagar	Dhiman Roy	AITC	98,042	49.98	Satyasebi Kar	CPI(M)	75,143	38.30	22,899	11.68
North 24 Parganas	102	Amdanga	Rafiqur Rahaman	AITC	96,193	50.00	Abdus Sattar	CPI(M)	73,228	38.06	22,965	11.94
North 24 Parganas	103	Bijpur	Subhranshu Roy	AITC	76,842	61.58	Dr. Rabindra Nath Mukherjee	CPI(M)	28,888	23.15	47,954	38.43
North 24 Parganas	104	Naihati	Partha Bhowmick	AITC	74,057	50.59	Gargi Chatterjee	CPI(M)	45,429	31.03	28,628	19.56
North 24 Parganas	105	Bhatpara	Arjun Singh	AITC	59,253	54.57	Jitendra Shaw (Jitu)	IND	30,318	27.92	28,935	26.65
North 24 Parganas	106	Jagatdal	Parash Dutta	AITC	76,712	46.36	Haripada Biswas	AIFB	49,667	30.02	27,045	16.34
North 24 Parganas	107	Noapara	Madhusudan Ghose	INC	79,548	42.05	Manju Basu	AITC	78,453	41.47	1,095	0.58
North 24 Parganas	108	Barrackpur	Silbhadra Datta	AITC	58,109	40.23	Debasish Bhowmick	CPI(M)	50,790	35.16	7,319	5.07
North 24 Parganas	109	Khardaha	Amit Mitra	AITC	83,688	49.65	Asim Kumar Dasgupta	CPI(M)	62,488	37.07	21,200	12.58
North 24 Parganas	110	Dum Dum Uttar	Tanmoy Bhattacharya	CPI(M)	91,959	46.38	Chandrima Bhattacharya	AITC	85,410	43.08	6,549	3.30
North 24 Parganas	111	Panihati	Nirmal Ghosh	AITC	73,545	44.69	Sanmoy Bandyopadhyay	INC	70,515	42.85	3,030	1.84
North 24 Parganas	112	Kamarhati	Manash Mukherjee	CPI(M)	62,194	45.09	Madan Mitra	AITC	57,996	42.04	4,198	3.05
North 24 Parganas	113	Baranagar	Tapas Roy	AITC	76,531	48.79	Sukumar Ghosh	RSP	60,431	38.52	16,100	10.27
North 24 Parganas	114	Dum Dum	Bratya Basu	AITC	81,579	46.73	Palash Das	CPI(M)	72,263	41.40	9,316	5.33
North 24 Parganas	115	Rajarhat New Town	Sabya Sachi Dutta	AITC	90,671	45.59	Narendra Nath Chatterjee (Balai)	CPI(M)	81,478	40.97	9,193	4.62
North 24 Parganas	116	Bidhannagar	Sujit Bose	AITC	66,130	42.86	Arunava Ghosh	INC	59,142	38.33	6,988	4.53
North 24 Parganas	117	Rajarhat Gopalpur	Purnendu Basu	AITC	72,793	44.30	Nepaldeb Bhattacharjee	CPI(M)	65,919	40.12	6,874	4.18
North 24 Parganas	118	Madhyamgram	Rathin Ghosh	AITC	1,10,271	53.09	Tapas Majumder	INC	74,467	35.85	35,804	17.24
North 24 Parganas	119	Barasat	Chiranjeet Chakrabarti	AITC	99,667	48.44	Chattopadhyay Sanjib	AIFB	74,668	36.29	24,999	12.15
North 24 Parganas	120	Deganga	Rahima Mondal	AITC	97,412	50.87	Md. Hasanoor Jaman Chowdhury	AIFB	71,422	37.29	25,990	13.58
North 24 Parganas	121	Haroa	Islam Sk. Nurul (Haji)	AITC	1,13,001	56.33	Imtiaz Hossain	CPI(M)	70,594	35.19	42,407	21.14
North 24 Parganas	122	Minakhan (SC)	Usha Rani Mondal	AITC	1,03,210	55.76	Dinabandhu Mondal	CPI(M)	60,612	32.75	42,598	23.01
North 24 Parganas	123	Sandeshkhali (ST)	Sukumar Mahata	AITC	96,556	51.49	Nirapada Sardar	CPI(M)	58,366	31.13	38,190	20.36
North 24 Parganas	124	Basirhat Dakshin	Dipendu Biswas (Mithu)	AITC	88,085	40.66	Samik Bhattacharya	BJP	64,027	29.55	24,058	11.11
North 24 Parganas	125	Basirhat Uttar	Rafikul Islam Mondal	CPI(M)	97,828	45.74	A.T.M. Abdullah (Rony)	AITC	97,336	45.51	492	0.23
North 24 Parganas	126	Hingalganj (SC)	Debes Mandal	AITC	94,753	53.00	Anandamay Mandal	CPI	64,449	36.05	30,304	16.95
South 24 Parganas	127	Gosaba (SC)	Jayanta Naskar	AITC	90,716	50.52	Uttam Kumar Saha	RSP	71,045	39.56	19,671	10.96
South 24 Parganas	128	Basanti (SC)	Gobinda Chandra Naskar	AITC	90,522	49.87	Subhas Naskar	RSP	73,915	40.72	16,607	9.15
South 24 Parganas	129	Kultali (SC)	Ram Sankar Halder	CPI(M)	73,932	37.37	Gopal Majhi	AITC	62,212	31.44	11,720	5.93
South 24 Parganas	130	Patharpratima	Samir Kumar Jana	AITC	1,07,595	50.85	Phanibhushan Giri	INC	93,802	44.33	13,793	6.52
South 24 Parganas	131	Kakdwip	Manturam Pakhira	AITC	1,04,750	53.70	Rafik Uddin Molla	INC	79,831	40.93	24,919	12.77
South 24 Parganas	132	Sagar	Bankim Chandra Hazra	AITC	1,12,812	51.79	Asim Kumar Mandal	CPI(M)	94,741	43.50	18,071	8.29
South 24 Parganas	133	Kulpi	Jogaranjan Halder	AITC	84,036	49.65	Rejaul Haque Khan	CPI(M)	72,581	42.88	11,455	6.77
South 24 Parganas	134	Raidighi	Debasree Roy	AITC	1,01,161	46.48	Kanti Ganguly	CPI(M)	99,932	45.92	1,229	0.56
South 24 Parganas	135	Mandirbazar (SC)	Halder Joydeb	AITC	94,339	52.72	Dr. Sarat Chandra Haldar	CPI(M)	69,400	38.78	24,939	13.94
South 24 Parganas	136	Jaynagar (SC)	Biswanath Das	AITC	64,582	36.23	Sujit Patwari	INC	49,531	27.78	15,051	8.45
South 24 Parganas	137	Baruipur Purba (SC)	Nirmal Chandra Mondal	AITC	92,313	48.09	Sujoy Mistry	CPI(M)	71,951	37.48	20,362	10.61
South 24 Parganas	138	Canning Paschim (SC)	Shyamal Mondal	AITC	93,498	49.08	Arnab Roy	INC	74,772	39.25	18,726	9.83
South 24 Parganas	139	Canning Purba	Saokat Molla	AITC	1,15,264	59.56	Ajijer Rahaman Molla	CPI(M)	60,230	31.12	55,034	28.44
South 24 Parganas	140	Baruipur Paschim	Biman Banerjee	AITC	99,945	54.73	Safiuddin Khan	CPI(M)	63,413	34.73	36,532	20.00
South 24 Parganas	141	Magrahat Purba (SC)	Namita Saha	AITC	89,486	48.70	Chandan Saha	CPI(M)	79,926	43.50	9,560	5.20
South 24 Parganas	142	Magrahat Paschim	Gias Uddin Molla	AITC	87,482	50.71	Khalid Ebadullah	INC	71,593	41.50	15,889	9.21
South 24 Parganas	143	Diamond Harbour	Dipak Kumar Halder	AITC	96,833	48.58	Dr. Abul Hasnat	CPI(M)	81,796	41.03	15,037	7.55
South 24 Parganas	144	Falta	Tamonash Ghosh	AITC	94,381	50.15	Bidhan Parui	CPI(M)	70,801	37.62	23,580	12.53
South 24 Parganas	145	Satgachia	Sonali Guha (Bose)	AITC	1,00,171	47.98	Paramita Ghosh	CPI(M)	82,899	39.70	17,272	8.28
South 24 Parganas	146	Bishnupur (SC)	Dilip Mondal	AITC	1,07,129	52.36	Aloke Sardar	CPI(M)	76,499	37.39	30,630	14.97
South 24 Parganas	147	Sonarpur Dakshin	Jiban Mukhopadhyay	AITC	97,455	47.80	Tarit Chakraborty	CPI	82,426	40.43	15,029	7.37
South 24 Parganas	148	Bhangore	Abdur Razzak Molla	AITC	1,02,087	49.57	Abdur Rasid Gazi	CPI(M)	83,963	40.77	18,124	8.80
South 24 Parganas	149	Kasba	Ahmed Javed Khan	AITC	91,679	46.52	Shatarup Ghosh	CPI(M)	79,795	40.49	11,884	6.03
South 24 Parganas	150	Jadavpur	Sujan Chakraborty	CPI(M)	98,977	48.51	Manish Gupta	AITC	84,035	41.19	14,942	7.32
South 24 Parganas	151	Sonarpur Uttar	Firdousi Begum	AITC	1,01,939	50.31	Jyotirmoyee Sikdar	CPI(M)	77,059	38.03	24,880	12.28
South 24 Parganas	152	Tollygunge	Aroop Biswas	AITC	90,603	46.73	Madhuja Sen Roy	CPI(M)	80,707	41.62	9,896	5.11
South 24 Parganas	153	Behala Purba	Sovan Chatterjee	AITC	96,621	47.33	Professor Ambikesh Mahapatra	IND	72,327	35.43	24,294	11.90
South 24 Parganas	154	Behala Paschim	Partha Chatterjee	AITC	1,02,114	45.98	Kaustav Chatterjee	CPI(M)	93,218	41.98	8,896	4.00
South 24 Parganas	155	Maheshtala	Kasturi Das	AITC	93,675	47.84	Samik Lahiri	CPI(M)	81,223	41.48	12,452	6.36
South 24 Parganas	156	Budge Budge	Ashok Kumar Deb	AITC	84,058	44.13	Sk. Mujibar Rahaman	INC	76,899	40.37	7,159	3.76
South 24 Parganas	157	Metiaburuz	Abdul Khaleque Molla	AITC	79,749	49.75	Monirul Islam	CPI(M)	61,773	38.54	17,976	11.21
Kolkata	158	Kolkata Port	Firhad Hakim	AITC	73,459	53.21	Rakesh Singh	INC	46,911	33.98	26,548	19.23
Kolkata	159	Bhabanipur	Mamata Banerjee	AITC	65,520	47.67	Deepa Dasmunshi	INC	40,219	29.26	25,301	18.41
Kolkata	160	Rashbehari	Sobhandeb Chattopadhyay	AITC	60,857	44.15	Ashutosh Chatterjee	INC	46,304	33.59	14,553	10.56
Kolkata	161	Ballygunge	Subrata Mukherjee	AITC	70,083	45.53	Krishna Debnath	INC	54,858	35.64	15,225	9.89
Kolkata	162	Chowrangee	Nayna Bandyopadhyay	AITC	55,119	47.29	Somendranath Mitra	INC	41,903	35.95	13,216	11.34
Kolkata	163	Entally	Swarna Kamal Saha	AITC	75,841	51.97	Debesh Das	CPI(M)	47,853	32.79	27,988	19.18
Kolkata	164	Beleghata	Paresh Paul	AITC	84,843	52.82	Rajib Biswas	CPI(M)	58,664	36.53	26,179	16.29
Kolkata	165	Jorasanko	Smita Bakshi	AITC	44,766	42.79	Rahul (Biswajit) Sinha	BJP	38,476	36.77	6,290	6.02
Kolkata	166	Shyampukur	Shashi Panja	AITC	53,507	45.80	Piyali Pal	AIFB	40,352	34.54	13,155	11.26
Kolkata	167	Maniktala	Sadhan Pande	AITC	73,157	50.60	Rajib Majumder	CPI(M)	47,846	33.09	25,311	17.51
Kolkata	168	Kashipur-Belgachia	Mala Saha	AITC	72,264	50.40	Kaninika Bose (Ghosh)	CPI(M)	46,454	32.40	25,810	18.00
Howrah	169	Bally	Baishali Dalmiya	AITC	52,702	46.97	Saumendranath Bera	CPI(M)	37,299	33.25	15,403	13.72
Howrah	170	Howrah Uttar	Laxmi Ratan Shukla	AITC	61,917	45.99	Santosh Kumar Pathak	INC	34,958	25.96	26,959	20.03
Howrah	171	Howrah Madhya	Arup Roy (Apu)	AITC	91,800	52.20	Amitabha Dutta	JD(U)	38,806	22.06	52,994	30.14
Howrah	172	Shibpur	Jatu Lahiri	AITC	88,076	51.86	Jagannath Bhattacharyya	AIFB	61,062	35.95	27,014	15.91
Howrah	173	Howrah Dakshin	Brajamohan Majumder	AITC	93,689	47.79	Arindam Basu (Babu)	CPI(M)	77,495	39.53	16,194	8.26
Howrah	174	Sankrail (SC)	Sital Kumar Sardar	AITC	86,212	44.70	Samir Malick	CPI(M)	71,455	37.05	14,757	7.65
Howrah	175	Panchla	Gulsan Mullick	AITC	1,01,126	52.98	Doli Roy	AIFB	69,199	36.25	31,927	16.73
Howrah	176	Uluberia Purba	Haider Aziz Safwi	AITC	72,192	42.19	Sabiruddin Molla	CPI(M)	55,923	32.68	16,269	9.51
Howrah	177	Uluberia Uttar (SC)	Dr. Nirmal Maji	AITC	79,390	48.13	Amiya Kumar Mondal	INC	65,208	39.53	14,182	8.60
Howrah	178	Uluberia Dakshin	Pulak Roy	AITC	95,902	54.11	Md. Nasiruddin	AIFB	60,558	34.17	35,344	19.94
Howrah	179	Shyampur	Kalipada Mandal	AITC	1,08,619	53.34	Amitabha Chakraborty	INC	82,033	40.29	26,586	13.05
Howrah	180	Bagnan	Arunava Sen (Raja)	AITC	97,834	54.10	Mina Mukherjee Ghosh	CPI(M)	67,637	37.40	30,197	16.70
Howrah	181	Amta	Asit Mitra	INC	89,149	47.05	Tushar Kanti Sil	AITC	84,645	44.67	4,504	2.38
Howrah	182	Udaynarayanpur	Samir Kumar Panja	AITC	94,828	52.12	Karar Saroj Ranjan	INC	71,070	39.06	23,758	13.06
Howrah	183	Jagatballavpur	Md. Abdul Ghani	AITC	1,03,348	48.70	Baidyanath Basu	CPI(M)	78,667	37.07	24,681	11.63
Howrah	184	Domjur	Rajib Banerjee	AITC	1,48,768	67.76	Protima Dutta	IND	41,067	18.70	1,07,701	49.06
Hooghly	185	Uttarpara	Prabir Kumar Ghosal	AITC	84,918	44.89	Prof. Dr. Srutinath Praharaj	CPI(M)	72,918	38.55	12,000	6.34
Hooghly	186	Sreerampur	Dr. Sudipta Roy	AITC	74,995	43.78	Subhankar Sarkar	INC	65,088	38.00	9,907	5.78
Hooghly	187	Champdani	Abdul Mannan	INC	81,330	44.14	Muzaffar Khan	AITC	74,048	40.19	7,282	3.95
Hooghly	188	Singur	Rabindranath Bhattacharya E	AITC	96,212	49.23	Rabin Deb	CPI(M)	75,885	38.83	20,327	10.40
Hooghly	189	Chandannagore	Indranil Sen E	AITC	75,727	44.83	Gautam Sarkar	CPI(M)	73,613	43.58	2,114	1.25
Hooghly	190	Chunchura	Asit Mazumder (Tapan)	AITC	1,18,501	49.06	Dr. Pranab Kumar Ghosh	AIFB	88,817	36.77	29,684	12.29
Hooghly	191	Balagarh (SC)	Ashim Kumar Majhi	AITC	96,472	47.36	Panchu Gopal Mondal	CPI(M)	78,635	38.61	17,837	8.75
Hooghly	192	Pandua	Amjad Hossain Sk.	CPI(M)	91,489	43.68	Saiyad Rahim Nabi	AITC	90,097	43.02	1,392	0.66
Hooghly	193	Saptagram	Tapan Dasgupta	AITC	88,208	48.93	Dilip Nath	INC	69,641	38.63	18,567	10.30
Hooghly	194	Chanditala	Swati Khandoker	AITC	91,874	48.28	Azim Ali Md. Sk.	CPI(M)	77,698	40.83	14,176	7.45
Hooghly	195	Jangipara	Snehasis Chakraborty	AITC	99,324	50.80	Pobitra Singha Roy	CPI(M)	75,719	38.73	23,605	12.07
Hooghly	196	Haripal	Becharam Manna E	AITC	1,10,899	53.22	Jogiyananda Mishra	CPI(M)	79,424	38.11	31,475	15.11
Hooghly	197	Dhanekhali (SC)	Asima Patra	AITC	1,25,298	57.54	Pradip Majumdar	AIFB	66,654	30.61	58,644	26.93
Hooghly	198	Tarakeswar	Rachhpal Singh E	AITC	97,588	50.75	Surajit Ghosh	NCP	69,898	36.35	27,690	14.40
Hooghly	199	Pursurah	Dr. M. Nuruzzaman	AITC	1,05,275	51.10	Pratim Singha Roy	INC	76,148	36.96	29,127	14.14
Hooghly	200	Arambagh (SC)	Krishna Chandra Santra	AITC	1,07,579	53.87	Asit Malik	CPI(M)	71,122	35.61	36,457	18.26
Hooghly	201	Goghat (SC)	Manas Majumdar	AITC	1,02,958	51.88	Biswanath Karak	AIFB	72,072	36.32	30,886	15.56
Hooghly	202	Khanakul	Iqbal Ahmed	AITC	1,06,878	54.04	Islam Ali Khan	CPI(M)	63,391	32.05	43,487	21.99
Purba Medinipur	203	Tamluk	Ashok Dinda	CPI	95,432	44.72	Nirbed Ray	AITC	94,912	44.47	520	0.25
Purba Medinipur	204	Panskura Purba	Sk Ibrahim Ali	CPI(M)	85,334	46.74	Biplab Roy Chowdhury	AITC	80,567	44.13	4,767	2.61
Purba Medinipur	205	Panskura Paschim	Phiroja Bibi	AITC	92,427	44.19	Chittaranjan Dasthakur	CPI	89,282	42.68	3,145	1.51
Purba Medinipur	206	Moyna	Sangram Kumar Dolai	AITC	1,00,980	50.25	Manik Bhowmik	INC	88,856	44.22	12,124	6.03
Purba Medinipur	207	Nandakumar	Sukumar De	AITC	98,549	48.11	Siraj Khan	IND	87,683	42.80	10,866	5.31
Purba Medinipur	208	Mahisadal	Dr. Sudarsan Ghosh Dastidar	AITC	94,827	48.10	Dr. Subrata Maiti	IND	78,118	39.62	16,709	8.48
Purba Medinipur	209	Haldia (SC)	Tapasi Mondal	CPI(M)	1,01,330	50.17	Madhurima Mandal	AITC	79,837	39.53	21,493	10.64
Purba Medinipur	210	Nandigram	Adhikari Suvendu	AITC	1,34,623	66.79	Abdul Kabir Sekh	CPI	53,393	26.49	81,230	40.30
Purba Medinipur	211	Chandipur	Amiyakanti Bhattacharjee	AITC	95,982	48.52	Mangal Chand Pradhan	CPI(M)	86,328	43.64	9,654	4.88
Purba Medinipur	212	Patashpur	Jyotirmoy Kar	AITC	1,03,567	54.51	Makhanlal Nayak	CPI	73,679	38.78	29,888	15.73
Purba Medinipur	213	Kanthi Uttar	Banasri Maity	AITC	1,03,783	50.09	Chakradhar Maikap	CPI(M)	85,207	41.13	18,576	8.96
Purba Medinipur	214	Bhagabanpur	Ardhendu Maity	AITC	1,11,201	54.18	Hemangshu Shekhar Mahapatra	INC	79,258	38.62	31,943	15.56
Purba Medinipur	215	Khejuri (SC)	Ranajit Mondal	AITC	1,03,699	54.30	Asim Kumar Mandal	IND	61,214	32.05	42,485	22.25
Purba Medinipur	216	Kanthi Dakshin	Adhikari Dibyendu	AITC	93,359	53.72	Uttam Pradhan	CPI	59,469	34.22	33,890	19.50
Purba Medinipur	217	Ramnagar	Akhil Giri	AITC	1,07,081	52.99	Tapas Sinha	CPI(M)	78,828	39.01	28,253	13.98
Purba Medinipur	218	Egra	Das Samares	AITC	1,13,334	51.31	Shaikh Mahmud Hossain	DSP(P)	87,378	39.56	25,956	11.75
Paschim Medinipur	219	Dantan	Bikram Chandra Pradhan	AITC	95,641	53.46	Sisir Kumar Patra	CPI	66,381	37.10	29,260	16.36
Jhargram	220	Nayagram (ST)	Dulal Murmu	AITC	98,395	56.22	Bakul Murmu	BJP	55,140	31.51	43,255	24.71
Jhargram	221	Gopiballavpur	Churamani Mahata	AITC	1,00,323	55.51	Pulin Bihari Baske	CPI(M)	50,765	28.09	49,558	27.42
Jhargram	222	Jhargram	Sukumar Hansda	AITC	99,233	54.97	Chunibala Hansda	JKP(N)	44,005	24.37	55,228	30.60
Paschim Medinipur	223	Keshiary (ST)	Paresh Murmu	AITC	1,04,890	53.99	Biram Mandi	CPI(M)	64,141	33.02	40,749	20.97
Paschim Medinipur	224	Kharagpur Sadar	Dilip Kumar Ghosh	BJP	61,446	39.29	Gyan Singh Sohanpal	INC	55,137	35.26	6,309	4.03
Paschim Medinipur	225	Narayangarh	Prodyut Kumar Ghosh	AITC	99,311	49.39	Surjyakanta Mishra	CPI(M)	85,722	42.63	13,589	6.76
Paschim Medinipur	226	Sabang	Manas Ranjan Bhunia	INC	1,26,987	59.23	Nirmal Ghosh	AITC	77,820	36.30	49,167	22.93
Paschim Medinipur	227	Pingla	Saumen Kumar Mahapatra	AITC	1,04,416	50.38	Prabodh Chandra Sinha	DSP(P)	80,198	38.69	24,218	11.69
Paschim Medinipur	228	Kharagpur	Dinen Roy	AITC	85,630	48.43	Sk Sajahan Ali	CPI(M)	66,531	37.63	19,099	10.80
Paschim Medinipur	229	Debra	Selima Khatun (Bibi)	AITC	90,773	47.96	Jahangir Karim Sk	CPI(M)	78,865	41.67	11,908	6.29
Paschim Medinipur	230	Daspur	Mamata Bhunia	AITC	1,13,603	52.82	Swapan Santra	CPI(M)	84,864	39.45	28,739	13.37
Paschim Medinipur	231	Ghatal (SC)	Shankar Dolai	AITC	1,07,682	49.77	Kamal Chandra Dolui	CPI(M)	88,203	40.76	19,479	9.01
Paschim Medinipur	232	Chandrakona (SC)	Chhaya Dolai	AITC	1,17,172	52.04	Santinath Bodhuk	CPI(M)	78,791	34.99	38,381	17.05
Paschim Medinipur	233	Garbeta	Ashis Chakraborty (Nanti)	AITC	1,10,501	58.86	Sorforaj Khan	CPI(M)	49,344	26.28	61,157	32.58
Paschim Medinipur	234	Salboni	Srikanta Mahata	AITC	1,20,485	53.91	Shyam Sundar Pandey	CPI(M)	67,583	30.24	52,902	23.67
Paschim Medinipur	235	Keshpur (SC)	Seuli Saha	AITC	1,46,579	71.63	Rameswar Doloi	CPI(M)	45,428	22.20	1,01,151	49.43
Paschim Medinipur	236	Medinipur	Mrigendra Nath Maiti	AITC	1,06,774	50.11	Santosh Rana	CPI	73,787	34.63	32,987	15.48
Jhargram	237	Binpur (ST)	Khagendranath Hembram	AITC	95,804	55.07	Dibakar Hansda	CPI(M)	46,481	26.72	49,323	28.35
Purulia	238	Bandwan (ST)	Rajib Lochan Saren	AITC	1,04,323	47.85	Besra Susanta	CPI(M)	84,016	38.53	20,307	9.32
Purulia	239	Balarampur	Shantiram Mahato	AITC	82,086	47.02	Jagadish Mahato	INC	71,882	41.17	10,204	5.85
Purulia	240	Baghmundi	Nepal Mahata	INC	88,707	47.16	Samir Mahato	AITC	80,120	42.59	8,587	4.57
Purulia	241	Joypur	Shaktipada Mahato	AITC	85,026	47.41	Dhirendra Nath Mahato	AIFB	76,263	42.52	8,763	4.89
Purulia	242	Purulia	Sudip Kumar Mukherjee	INC	81,365	44.58	Dibyajyoti Prasad Singh Deo	AITC	76,454	41.89	4,911	2.69
Purulia	243	Manbazar (ST)	Sandhya Rani Tudu	AITC	93,642	48.72	Ipil Murmu	CPI(M)	83,967	43.69	9,675	5.03
Purulia	244	Kashipur	Swapan Kumar Beltharia	AITC	87,483	48.71	Sudin Kisku	CPI(M)	67,905	37.81	19,578	10.90
Purulia	245	Para (SC)	Umapada Bauri	AITC	84,337	47.59	Dinanath Bauri	CPI(M)	70,459	39.76	13,878	7.83
Purulia	246	Raghunathpur (SC)	Purna Chandra Bauri	AITC	83,688	43.39	Satyanarayan Bauri	CPI(M)	67,546	35.02	16,142	8.37
Bankura	247	Saltora (SC)	Swapan Bouri	AITC	84,979	46.20	Sasthi Charan Bouri	CPI(M)	72,456	39.39	12,523	6.81
Bankura	248	Chhatna	Dhirendra Nath Layek	RSP	73,648	41.13	Subhasis Batabyal	AITC	71,231	39.78	2,417	1.35
Bankura	249	Ranibandh (ST)	Jyotsna Mandi	AITC	92,181	47.48	Deblina Hembram	CPI(M)	68,868	35.48	23,313	12.00
Bankura	250	Raipur (ST)	Birendra Nath Tudu	AITC	89,841	50.67	Dilip Kumar Hansda	CPI(M)	63,119	35.60	26,722	15.07
Bankura	251	Taldangra	Samir Chakraborty	AITC	87,236	47.56	Amiya Patra	CPI(M)	73,567	40.10	13,669	7.46
Bankura	252	Bankura	Daripa Shampa	INC	83,486	42.45	Minati Misra	AITC	82,457	41.93	1,029	0.52
Bankura	253	Barjora	Sujit Chakraborty	CPI(M)	86,873	43.42	Soham Chakraborty	AITC	86,257	43.11	616	0.31
Bankura	254	Onda	Arup Kumar Khan	AITC	80,603	40.70	Manik Mukherjee	AIFB	69,755	35.23	10,848	5.47
Bankura	255	Bishnupur	Tushar Kanti Bhattacharya	INC	76,641	44.22	Shyamaprasad Mukherjee	AITC	75,750	43.71	891	0.51
Bankura	256	Kotulpur (SC)	Shyamal Santra	AITC	98,901	49.03	Akshay Santra	INC	77,653	38.50	21,248	10.53
Bankura	257	Indas (SC)	Gurupada Mete	AITC	94,940	48.14	Dilip Kumar Malik	CPI(M)	76,103	38.59	18,837	9.55
Bankura	258	Sonamukhi (SC)	Ajit Ray	CPI(M)	86,125	46.05	Dipali Saha	AITC	77,406	41.39	8,719	4.66
Purba Bardhaman	259	Khandaghosh (SC)	Nabin Chandra Bag	AITC	90,151	45.88	Asima Roy	CPI(M)	86,949	44.25	3,202	1.63
Purba Bardhaman	260	Bardhaman Dakshin	Rabiranjan Chattopadhyay	AITC	91,882	47.34	Ainul Haque	CPI(M)	62,444	32.17	29,438	15.17
Purba Bardhaman	261	Raina (SC)	Nepal Ghorui	AITC	94,323	45.77	Khan Basudeb	CPI(M)	93,875	45.55	448	0.22
Purba Bardhaman	262	Jamalpur (SC)	Samar Hazra	CPI(M)	85,491	44.53	Ujjal Pramanick	AITC	84,068	43.79	1,423	0.74
Purba Bardhaman	263	Monteswar	Sajal Panja	AITC	84,134	44.11	Chaudhuri Md. Hedayatullah	CPI(M)	83,428	43.74	706	0.37
Purba Bardhaman	264	Kalna (SC)	Kundu Biswajit	AITC	97,430	50.32	Sukul Chandra Sikdar	CPI(M)	72,169	37.27	25,261	13.05
Purba Bardhaman	265	Memari	Begum Nargis	AITC	94,406	46.35	Debashis Ghosh	CPI(M)	85,523	41.99	8,883	4.36
Purba Bardhaman	266	Bardhaman Uttar (SC)	Nisith Kumar Malik	AITC	1,02,886	47.43	Aparna Saha	CPI(M)	91,381	42.12	11,505	5.31
Purba Bardhaman	267	Bhatar	Subhash Mondal	AITC	92,544	46.86	Bamacharan Banerjee	CPI(M)	86,264	43.68	6,280	3.18
Purba Bardhaman	268	Purbasthali Dakshin	Swapan Debnath	AITC	1,04,398	52.85	Abhijit Bhattacharyya	INC	66,732	33.78	37,666	19.07
Purba Bardhaman	269	Purbasthali Uttar	Pradip Kumar Saha	CPI(M)	84,549	43.38	Tapan Chatterjee	AITC	81,721	41.93	2,828	1.45
Purba Bardhaman	270	Katwa	Rabindranath Chatterjee	AITC	91,489	44.81	Shyama Majumdar	INC	90,578	44.36	911	0.45
Purba Bardhaman	271	Ketugram	Sekh Sahonawez	AITC	89,441	46.20	Abul Kadar Syed	CPI(M)	80,712	41.69	8,729	4.51
Purba Bardhaman	272	Mangalkot	Chowdhury Siddiqullah	AITC	89,812	45.87	Choudhury Sahajahan	CPI(M)	77,938	39.81	11,874	6.06
Purba Bardhaman	273	Ausgram (SC)	Abhedananda Thander	AITC	90,450	45.94	Basudev Mete	CPI(M)	84,198	42.76	6,252	3.18
Purba Bardhaman	274	Galsi (SC)	Alok Kumar Majhi	AITC	95,203	46.44	Nandalal Pondit	AIFB	84,432	41.19	10,771	5.25
Paschim Bardhaman	275	Pandabeswar	Kumar Jitendra Tewari	AITC	68,600	45.04	Gouranga Chatterjee	CPI(M)	63,130	41.44	5,470	3.60
Paschim Bardhaman	276	Durgapur Purba	Santosh Debray	CPI(M)	84,200	44.22	Pradip Mazumdar	AITC	75,069	39.42	9,131	4.80
Paschim Bardhaman	277	Durgapur Paschim	Bishwanath Parial	INC	1,08,533	54.44	Apurba Mukherjee	AITC	63,709	31.95	44,824	22.49
Paschim Bardhaman	278	Raniganj	Runu Dutta	CPI(M)	74,995	42.32	Bano Nargis	AITC	62,610	35.33	12,385	6.99
Paschim Bardhaman	279	Jamuria	Jahanara Khan	CPI(M)	67,214	43.28	V. Sivadasan (Dasu)	AITC	59,457	38.29	7,757	4.99
Paschim Bardhaman	280	Asansol Dakshin	Tapas Banerjee	AITC	71,515	38.54	Hemant Prabhakar	CPI(M)	57,232	30.84	14,283	7.70
Paschim Bardhaman	281	Asansol Uttar	Moloy Ghatak	AITC	84,715	46.12	Nirmal Karmakar	BJP	60,818	33.11	23,897	13.01
Paschim Bardhaman	282	Kulti	Ujjal Chatterjee	AITC	68,952	40.81	Ajay Kumar Poddar	BJP	49,464	29.28	19,488	11.53
Paschim Bardhaman	283	Barbani	Bidhan Upadhyay	AITC	77,464	47.13	Shipra Mukherjee	CPI(M)	53,415	32.50	24,049	14.63
Birbhum	284	Dubrajpur (SC)	Chandra Naresh Bauri	AITC	94,309	51.72	Bijoy Bagdi	AIFB	54,415	29.84	39,894	21.88
Birbhum	285	Suri	Asok Kumar Chattopadhyay	AITC	94,036	47.68	Dr. Ram Chandra Dome	CPI(M)	62,228	31.55	31,808	16.13
Birbhum	286	Bolpur	Chandranath Sinha	AITC	1,13,258	54.80	Tapan Hore	RSP	63,231	30.60	50,027	24.20
Birbhum	287	Nanoor (SC)	Shyamali Pradhan	CPI(M)	1,04,374	50.07	Gadadhar Hazra	AITC	78,644	37.73	25,730	12.34
Birbhum	288	Labpur	Islam Monirul	AITC	1,01,138	52.40	Syed Mahfuzul Karim (Mahfuz)	CPI(M)	70,825	36.69	30,313	15.71
Birbhum	289	Sainthia (SC)	Nilabati Saha	AITC	1,03,376	52.17	Dhiren Bagdi	CPI(M)	64,765	32.68	38,611	19.49
Birbhum	290	Mayureswar	Abhijit Roy	AITC	89,210	48.54	Arup Bag	CPI(M)	50,440	27.44	38,770	21.10
Birbhum	291	Rampurhat	Asish Banerjee	AITC	85,435	43.68	Syed Siraj Jimmi	INC	64,236	32.84	21,199	10.84
Birbhum	292	Hansan	Miltan Rasid	INC	92,619	49.94	Asit Kumar Mal	AITC	76,465	41.23	16,154	8.71
Birbhum	293	Nalhati	Moinuddin Shams	AITC	83,412	45.33	Dipak Chatterjee	AIFB	73,084	39.71	10,328	5.62
Birbhum	294	Murarai	Abdur Rahaman (Liton)	AITC	94,661	47.51	Ali Mortuza Khan	INC	94,381	47.37	280	0.14

== 2016–2021 by-elections ==
S.No	Date	Constituency	Previous MLA	Party before election	Elected MLA	Party after election
263	19 November 2016	Monteswar	Sajal Panja	Trinamool Congress	Saikat Panja	Trinamool Congress
216	9 April 2017	Kanthi Dakshin	Dibyendu Adhikari	Trinamool Congress	Chandrima Bhattacharya	Trinamool Congress
226	21 December 2017	Sabang	Manas Bhunia	Indian National Congress	Geeta Rani Bhunia	Trinamool Congress
107	29 January 2018	Noapara	Madhusudan Ghose	Indian National Congress	Sunil Singh	Trinamool Congress
155	28 May 2018	Maheshtala	Kasturi Das	Trinamool Congress	Dulal Chandra Das	Trinamool Congress
29	18 April 2019	Islampur	Kanaia Lal Agarwal	Indian National Congress	Abdul Karim Chowdhury	Trinamool Congress
23	18 April 2019	Darjeeling	Amar Singh Rai	Gorkha Janmukti Morcha	Neeraj Zimba	Bharatiya Janata Party
43	23 April 2019	Habibpur	Khagen Murmu	Communist Party of India (Marxist)	Joyel Murmu	Bharatiya Janata Party
74	29 April 2019	Naoda	Abu Taher Khan	Indian National Congress	Sahina Mumtaz Begum	Trinamool Congress
68	29 April 2019	Kandi	Apurba Sarkar	Indian National Congress	Shafiul Alam Khan	Indian National Congress
88	29 April 2019	Krishnaganj	Satyajit Biswas	Trinamool Congress	Ashish Kumar Biswas	Bharatiya Janata Party
105	6 May 2019	Bhatpara	Arjun Singh	Trinamool Congress	Pawan Kumar Singh	Bharatiya Janata Party
176	6 May 2019	Uluberia Purba	Haider Aziz Safwi	Trinamool Congress	Idris Ali	Trinamool Congress
77	25 November 2019	Karimpur	Mahua Moitra	Trinamool Congress	Bimalendu Sinha Roy	Trinamool Congress
34	25 November 2019	Kaliaganj	Pramatha Ray	Indian National Congress	Tapan Deb Singha	Trinamool Congress
224	25 November 2019	Kharagpur	Dilip Ghosh	Bharatiya Janata Party	Pradip Sarkar	Trinamool Congress

== See also ==
- Elections in India
- 2016 elections in India
- List of constituencies of West Bengal Legislative Assembly
- 2019 Indian general election in West Bengal
