= Phansidewa Assembly constituency =

Constituency of the West Bengal Legislative Assembly, in India

Phansidewa (ST) Assembly constituency
- Constituency No. 27 for the West Bengal Legislative Assembly
- Interactive Map Outlining Phansidewa (ST) Assembly Constituency

Constituency details
- Country: India
- Region: East India
- State: West Bengal
- District: Darjeeling
- Lok Sabha constituency: Darjeeling
- Established: 1962
- Total electors: 217,918
- Reservation: ST

Member of Legislative Assembly
- 18th West Bengal Legislative Assembly
- Incumbent Durga Murmu
- Party: Bharatiya Janata Party
- Elected year: 2026
- Preceded by: Sunil Chandra Tirkey

Phansidewa (ST) Assembly constituency is an assembly constituency in Darjeeling district in the Indian state of West Bengal. It is reserved for members of the Scheduled Tribes.

Most Successful parties from Phansidewa(ST) Assembly
1. Communist Party of India (Marxist) (7 times) (43.8%)
2. Indian National Congress (7 times) (43.8%)
3. Bharatiya Janata Party(2 times) (12.5%)

== Overview ==
As per orders of the Delimitation Commission, No. 27 Phansidewa Assembly constituency (ST) covers Phansidewa and Kharibari community development blocks.

Phansidewa Assembly constituency is part of No. 4 Darjeeling Lok Sabha constituency.

== Members of the Legislative Assembly ==
Election Year	MLA	Party
1962	Tenzing Wangdi	Indian National Congress
1967	Tenzing Wangdi	Indian National Congress
1969	Iswar Chandra Tirkey	Indian National Congress
1971	Iswar Chandra Tirkey	Indian National Congress
1972	Iswar Chandra Tirkey	Indian National Congress
1977	Patras Minz	Communist Party of India (Marxist)
1982	Patras Minz	Communist Party of India (Marxist)
1987	Prokash Minz	Communist Party of India (Marxist)
1991	Prokash Minz	Communist Party of India (Marxist)
1996	Prokash Minz	Communist Party of India (Marxist)
2001	Prokash Minz	Communist Party of India (Marxist)
2006	Choton Kisku	Communist Party of India (Marxist)
2011	Sunil Chandra Tirkey	Indian National Congress
2016	Sunil Chandra Tirkey	Indian National Congress
2021	Durga Murmu	Bharatiya Janata Party
2026	Durga Murmu	Bharatiya Janata Party

== Election Results ==
=== 2026 ===
In the 2026 West Bengal Legislative Assembly election, Durga Murmu of BJP defeated his nearest rival Reena Topno Ekka of TMC by 45263 votes.

2026 West Bengal Legislative Assembly election: Phansidewa (ST)
Party	Candidate	Votes	%	±%
BJP	Durga Murmu	118,241	56.92	▲6.03
AITC	Reena Topno Ekka	72,978	35.13	▼2.42
INC	Navaneeta Tirkey	4,948	2.38	▼3.79
IND	Amit Kumar Lakra	3,503	1.69	New entry
CPI(ML)L	Sumanti Ekka	2,229	1.07	▼0.27
NOTA	Nota	2,193	1.06	▼0.18
Majority		45,263	21.79	▲8.45
Turnout		207,732	95.33	▲9.01
BJP hold		Swing	4.22	

=== 2021 ===
2021 West Bengal Legislative Assembly election: Phansidewa (ST) constituency
Party	Candidate	Votes	%	±%
BJP	Durga Murmu	105,651	50.89	▲32.75
AITC	Chhotan Kisku	77,940	37.55	
INC	Sunil Chandra Tirkey	12,815	6.17	▼34.18
CPI(ML)L	Sumanti Ekka	2,787	1.34	
BSP	Karuna Ranjan Soren	2,291	1.1	
NOTA	None of the above	2,575	1.24	
Majority		27,711	13.34	
Turnout		207,590	86.32	
BJP gain from INC		Swing		

=== 2016 ===
2016 West Bengal Legislative Assembly election: Phansidewa (ST) constituency
Party	Candidate	Votes	%	±%
INC	Sunil Chandra Tirkey	73,158	40.35	▼2.2
AITC	Carolus Lakra	66,084	36.45	New entry
BJP	Durga Murmu	32,894	18.14	▲14.17
Independent	Jemshan Tirkey	2,072	1.14	
CPI(ML)L	Lalu Oraon	1,596	0.88	▼0.6
BMP	Bikash Birju	1,474	0.81	
Independent	Sushil Lakra	1,373	0.75	
NOTA	None of the Above	2,629	1.45	
Majority		7,074	3.90	▲2.32
Turnout		1,81,280	87.85	
INC hold		Swing		

=== 2011 ===
2011 West Bengal Legislative Assembly election: Phansidewa (ST) constituency
Party	Candidate	Votes	%	±%
INC	Sunil Chandra Tirkey	61,388	42.55	▲11.35
CPI(M)	Choton Kisku	59,151	41.00	▼9.22
Rashtriya Deshaj Party	Junas Kerketta	7,536	5.22	
BJP	Dila Saibo	5,734	3.97	▼3.95
KPP	Helarius Ekka	4,114	2.85	
CPI(ML)L	Kandra Murmu	2,138	1.48	
Independent	Sudhir Tirki	1,896	1.31	
CPI(ML)L	Ram Ganesh Baraik	1,286	0.89	
SUCI(C)	Bhola Tirki	1,028	0.71	
Majority		2,237	1.58	▼17.44
Turnout		144,271	87.49	
INC gain from CPI(M)		Swing		

=== 2006 ===
2006 West Bengal Legislative Assembly election: Phansidewa (ST) constituency
Party	Candidate	Votes	%	±%
CPI(M)	Choton Kisku	93,689	50.22	▲2.77
INC	Mamla Kujur	58,185	31.2	▲1.28
BJP	Dila Saibo	14,788	7.92	▲4.42
Independent	Ram Ganesh Baraik	8,337	4.5	
GNLF	Ishwaridan Guria	4,556	2.44	▼0.29
CPI(ML)L	Rengta Murmu	2,365	1.3	
BSP	Sudhir Hansda	2,346	1.25	
Independent	Mahendra Bhagat	2,273	1.22	
Majority		35,504	19.02	▲1.49
Turnout		1,86,539		
CPI(M) hold		Swing		

=== 2001 ===
2001 West Bengal Legislative Assembly election: Phansidewa (ST) constituency
Party	Candidate	Votes	%	±%
CPI(M)	Prokash Minz	77,507	47.45	▼3.34
INC	Mamla Kujur	48,870	29.92	▼9.98
Independent	Cornelius Tigga	17,915	10.97	
Independent	Ram Ganesh Baraik	6,977	4.27	
BJP	Sukhdeo Bhagat	5,723	3.5	▼2.16
GNLF	Akul Munda	4,467	2.73	
Independent	Mahendra Bhagat	1,870	1.14	
Majority		28,637	17.53	▲6.64
Turnout		1,63,329	71.86	
CPI(M) hold		Swing		

=== 1996 ===
1996 West Bengal Legislative Assembly election: Phansidewa (ST) constituency
Party	Candidate	Votes	%	±%
CPI(M)	Prokash Minz	85,845	50.79	▲3.78
INC	Chhabilal Minj	67,439	39.9	▲0.09
BJP	Ratan Kumar Hansda	9,559	5.66	▼2.25
Independent	Ram Ganesh Baraik	3,936	2.33	
BSP	Radha Munda	1,379	0.82	▼0.32
CPI(ML)L	Rengta Murmu	592	0.35	
Independent	Ekka Samarendra (Pintu)	279	0.17	
Majority		18,406	10.89	
Turnout		1,69,029	82.79	
CPI(M) hold		Swing		

=== 1991 ===
1991 West Bengal Legislative Assembly election: Phansidewa (ST) constituency
Party	Candidate	Votes	%	±%
CPI(M)	Prokash Minz	62,076	47.01%	Winner
INC	Iswar Chandra Tirkey	52,574	39.81%	
BJP	Tereser Sorang Chacko	10,441	7.91%	
Independent	Bandhan Uraon	2,203	1.67%	
Independent	Shanti Sarker (Munda)	1,916	1.45%	
BSP	Babun Murmu	1,502	1.14%	
Independent	Bigu Uraon	1,096	0.83%	
Independent	Suklal Tudu	247	0.19%	
Majority		9,502	7.2%	
Turnout		1,32,055	72.4%	
CPI(M) hold		Swing		

=== 1987 ===
1987 West Bengal Legislative Assembly election: Phansidewa (ST) constituency
Party	Candidate	Votes	%	±%
CPI(M)	Prokash Minz	53,685	49.44%	Winner
INC	Iswar Chandra Tirkey	47,344	43.6%	
Independent	Santi Sarkar (Munda)	3,254	3%	
Independent	Patras Minj	2,045	1.88%	
Independent	Pandoo Baraik	1,054	0.97%	
Independent	Bandhan Uraon	630	0.58%	
Independent	Oraon Maturam	569	0.52%	
Majority		6,341	5.84%	
Turnout		1,08,581	66.61%	
CPI(M) hold		Swing		

=== 1982 ===
1982 West Bengal Legislative Assembly election: Phansidewa (ST) constituency
Party	Candidate	Votes	%	±%
CPI(M)	Patras Minz	41,362	45.76%	Winner
INC	Iswar Chandra Tirkey	36,076	39.92%	
JP	Teresa Sorang Chacko	5,120	5.66%	
Independent	Edwar Tirkey	3,973	4.4%	
Independent	Santi Munda	2,725	3.03%	
Independent	Dharmendra Nath Birja	1,114	1.23%	
Majority		5,286	5.84%	
Turnout		90,370	73.69%	
CPI(M) hold		Swing		

=== 1977 ===
1977 West Bengal Legislative Assembly election: Phansidewa (ST) constituency
Party	Candidate	Votes	%	±%
CPI(M)	Patras Minz	20,819	41.9%	Winner
JP	Teresa Sorang Chacko	13,354	26.87%	
INC	Iswar Chandra Tirkey	11,969	24.09%	
CPI	Besra Ramesh	3,550	7.14%	
Majority		7,465	15.03%	
Turnout		49,692	52.13%	
CPI(M) gain from INC		Swing		

=== 1972 ===
1972 West Bengal Legislative Assembly election: Phansidewa (ST) constituency
Party	Candidate	Votes	%	±%
INC(R)	Iswar Chandra Tirkey	27,894	62.26%	Winner
CPI(M)	Patras Minz	16,912	37.74%	
Majority		10,907	24.52%	
Turnout		44,806	55.21%	
INC hold		Swing		

=== 1971 ===
1971 West Bengal Legislative Assembly election: Phansidewa (ST) constituency
Party	Candidate	Votes	%	±%
INC	Iswar Chandra Tirkey	19,259	43.76%	Winner
CPI(M)	Patras Minz	14,678	33.35%	
AIFB	Gopal Hansda	3,415	7.76%	
Bangla Congress	Oraon Marianus Tigga	2,169	4.93%	
RSP	Joseph Kunda	1,968	4.47%	
INC(O)	Timba Oraon	1,799	4.09%	
Independent	Anjulush Murmu	725	1.65%	
Majority		4,581	10.41%	
Turnout		44,013	57.35%	
INC hold		Swing		

=== 1969 ===
1969 West Bengal Legislative Assembly election: Phansidewa (ST) constituency
Party	Candidate	Votes	%	±%
INC	Iswar Chandra Tirkey	20,974	65.13%	Winner
CPI(M)	Patras Minz	11,228	34.86%	
Majority		9,746	30.27%	
Turnout		32,202		
INC hold		Swing		

=== 1967 ===
1967 West Bengal Legislative Assembly election: Phansidewa (ST) constituency
Party	Candidate	Votes	%	±%
INC	Tenzing Wangdi	16,227	60.75%	Winner
CPI(M)	Jangal Santhal	10,484	39.25%	
Majority		5,743	21.5%	
Turnout		26,711		
INC hold		Swing		

=== 1962 ===
1962 West Bengal Legislative Assembly election: Phansidewa (ST) constituency
Party	Candidate	Votes	%	±%
INC	Tenzing Wangdi	10,389	53.21%	Winner
CPI	Jangal Santhal	9,132	46.78%	
Majority		1,257		
Turnout		19,521		
INC win (new seat)				
