= Alberuni Zulkarnain =

Indian politician

Alberuni Zulkarnain (born 1981) is an Indian politician from West Bengal. He is a former member of the West Bengal Legislative Assembly from Malatipur Assembly constituency in Malda district. He was elected in the 2016 West Bengal Legislative Assembly election representing the Indian National Congress.

== Early life and education ==
Zulkarnain is from Malatipur, Malda district, West Bengal. He is the son of late Congress leader and doctor, Golam Yazdani, a six time former MLA and minister. He completed his MA at Delhi University in 2005. He is a social worker and his wife is a homemaker.

== Career ==
Zulkarnain was elected from Malatipur Assembly constituency representing the Indian National Congress in the 2016 West Bengal Legislative Assembly election. He polled 50,643 votes and defeated his nearest rival, Abdur Rahim Boxi of the Revolutionary Socialist Party, by a margin of 2,610 votes. He contested again in the 2021 West Bengal Legislative Assembly election but lost the seat to Rahim Boxi, who shifted and contested on All India Trinamool Congress ticket. Zulkarnain polled 19,827 votes and finished third behind winner Rahim Boxi and Mausumi Das of the Bharatiya Janata Party, who finished second. Rahim Boxi got 126,157 votes and defeated Mausumi Das, who garnered 34,208 votes.
