= Kushmandi Assembly constituency =

Kushmandi
- Constituency No. 37 for the West Bengal Legislative Assembly
- Interactive Map Outlining Kushmandi Assembly Constituency

Constituency details
- Country: India
- Region: East India
- State: West Bengal
- District: Dakshin Dinajpur
- Lok Sabha constituency: Balurghat
- Established: 1962
- Total electors: 219,921
- Reservation: SC

Member of Legislative Assembly
- 18th West Bengal Legislative Assembly
- Incumbent Tapas Chandra Roy
- Party: BJP
- Alliance: NDA
- Elected year: 2026

Kushmandi Assembly constituency is an assembly constituency in Dakshin Dinajpur district in the Indian state of West Bengal. It is reserved for scheduled castes.

== Overview ==
As per orders of the Delimitation Commission, No. 37 Kushmandi Assembly constituency (SC) covers Kushmandi community development block and Belbari II, Jahangirpur and Sukdebpur gram panchayats of Gangarampur community development block.

Kushmandi Assembly constituency is part of No. 6 Balurghat Lok Sabha constituency.

== Members of the Legislative Assembly ==
Year	Name	Party
1962	Khalil Sayed	Communist Party of India
1967	Jatindra Mohan Roy	Indian National Congress
1969	Jatindra Mohan Roy	Indian National Congress
1971	Jatindra Mohan Roy	Indian National Congress
1972	Jatindra Mohan Roy	Indian National Congress
1977	Dhirendra Nath Sarkar	Indian National Congress
1982	Dhirendra Nath Sarkar	Indian National Congress
1987	Narmada Chandra Roy	Revolutionary Socialist Party
1991	Narmada Chandra Roy	Revolutionary Socialist Party
1996	Narmada Chandra Roy	Revolutionary Socialist Party
2001	Narmada Chandra Roy	Revolutionary Socialist Party
2006	Narmada Chandra Roy	Revolutionary Socialist Party
2011	Narmada Chandra Roy	Revolutionary Socialist Party
2016	Narmada Chandra Roy	Revolutionary Socialist Party
2021	Rekha Roy	Trinamool Congress
2026	Tapas Chandra Roy	Bharatiya Janata Party

== Election results ==
Vote share of Winning candidates
2026	48.83%
2021	48.88%
2016	43.20%
2011	47.42%
2006	46.86%
2001	48.40%
1996	47.22%
1991	45.48%
1987	53.98%
1982	50.23%
1977	44.20%
1972	76.54%
1971	52.93%
1969	50.06%
1967	40.18%
1962	41.88%

=== 2026 ===
2026 West Bengal Legislative Assembly election: Kushmandi
Party	Candidate	Votes	%	±%
BJP	Tapas Chandra Roy	97,437	48.83	▲6.79
AITC	Rekha Roy	88,374	44.29	▼4.59
RSP	Jyotirmoy Roy	6,861	3.44	▼3.39
INC	Bablu Sarkar	2,645	1.33	▼43.49
NOTA	None of the above	1,584	0.79	▼0.08
Majority		9,063	4.54	▼2.3
Turnout		199,526	96.84	▲13.14
BJP gain from AITC		Swing		

=== 2021 ===
2021 West Bengal Legislative Assembly election: Kushmandi
Party	Candidate	Votes	%	±%
AITC	Rekha Roy	89,968	48.88	+7.88
BJP	Ranjit Kumar Roy	77,384	42.04	+29.34
RSP	Narmada Chandra Roy	12,571	6.83	−36.37
NOTA	None of the above	1,598	0.87	
Majority		12,584	6.84	
Turnout		184,075	83.7	
AITC gain from RSP		Swing		

=== 2016 ===
2016 West Bengal Legislative Assembly election: Kushmandi
Party	Candidate	Votes	%	±%
RSP	Narmada Chandra Roy	68,965	43.20	−4.22
AITC	Rekha Roy	65,436	41.00	−3.82
BJP	Ranjit Kumar Roy	20,183	12.70	
NOTA	None of the above	3,941	2.41	
BSP	Jaydeb Mondal	2,009	1.30	
Independent	Anil Kumar Singha	1,495	0.90	
Independent	Jagannath Roy	1,468	0.90	
Majority		3,529		
Turnout		1,59,556	85.80	−4.88
RSP hold		Swing		

=== 2011 ===
2011 West Bengal Legislative Assembly election: Kushmandi
Party	Candidate	Votes	%	±%
RSP	Narmada Chandra Roy	66,368	47.42	
INC	Parthasarathi Sarkar	62,725	44.82	
BJP	Ranjit Kumar Roy	5,286	3.78	
Independent	Raghunath Sarkar	2,306		
BSP	Prasanta Mandal	1,295		
CPI(ML)L	Subesh Sarkar	1,057		
Independent	Gouranga Barman	915		
Majority		3,643	2.60	
Turnout		1,39,952	89.88	
RSP hold		Swing		

=== 2006 ===
2006 West Bengal Legislative Assembly election: Kushmandi (SC)
Party	Candidate	Votes	%	±%
RSP	Narmada Chandra Roy	66,131	46.86	
INC	Rajib Lochan Sarkar	43,915	31.12	
AITC	Jitendra Nath Sarkar	21,503	15.24	
Independent	Siben Sarkar	3,576	2.53	
Independent	Aniruddha Roy	1,761	1.25	
CPI(M-L)	Gouranga Barman	1,605	1.14	
Independent	Sashadhar Roy	1,417	1.00	
BSP	Dipesh Sarkar	1,218	0.86	
Majority		22,216	15.74	
Turnout				
RSP hold		Swing		

=== 2001 ===
2001 West Bengal Legislative Assembly election: Kushmandi (SC)
Party	Candidate	Votes	%	±%
RSP	Narmada Chandra Roy	61,600	48.40	
AITC	Jitendra Nath Sarkar	52,705	41.41	
BJP	Gouri Sarkar	9,066	7.12	
MCPI(S)	Sasadhar Roy	2,014	1.58	
SJP	Jiten Ray Sinha	1,898	1.49	
Majority		8,895	6.99	
Turnout		127,400	80.96	
RSP hold		Swing		

=== 1996 ===
1996 West Bengal Legislative Assembly election: Kushmandi (SC)
Party	Candidate	Votes	%	±%
RSP	Roy Narmada Chandra	59,176	47.22	
INC	Krishna Chandra Sarkar	49,232	39.29	
BJP	Abinash Chandra Sarkar	14,626	11.67	
Independent	Brajamohan Roy	1,254	1.00	
Independent	Jiten Roy Sinha	622	0.50	
Independent	Atul Barman	248	0.20	
Independent	Bhupendra Nath Barman	160	0.13	
Majority		9,944	7.93	
Turnout		127,924	85.64	
RSP hold		Swing		

=== 1991 ===
1991 West Bengal Legislative Assembly election: Kushmandi (SC)
Party	Candidate	Votes	%	±%
RSP	Narmada Chandra Roy	47,449	45.48	
INC	Jitendra Nath Sarker	39,760	38.11	
BJP	Abinash Chandra Sarker	16,153	15.48	
Independent	Braja Mohan Roy	489	0.47	
Independent	Bhupendra Nath Barman	248	0.24	
MCPI	Atul Chandra Barman	223	0.21	
Majority		7,689	7.37	
Turnout		106,218	82.12	
RSP hold		Swing		

=== 1987 ===
1987 West Bengal Legislative Assembly election: Kushmandi (SC)
Party	Candidate	Votes	%	±%
RSP	Narmada Roy	48,500	53.98	
INC	Dhirendra Nath Sarkar	38,649	43.02	
Independent	Prabhat Ranjan Roy	2,441	2.72	
Independent	Ananda Roy	253	0.28	
Majority		9,851	10.96	
Turnout		91,226	82.10	
Swing to RSP from INC		Swing		

=== 1982 ===
1982 West Bengal Legislative Assembly election: Kushmandi (SC)
Party	Candidate	Votes	%	±%
INC	Dhirendra Nath Sarkar	39,896	50.23	
RSP	Narmada Roy	39,001	49.10	
Independent	Ananda Roy	530	0.67	
Majority		895	1.13	
Turnout		81,174	81.78	
INC hold		Swing		

=== 1977 ===
1977 West Bengal Legislative Assembly election: Kushmandi (SC)
Party	Candidate	Votes	%	±%
INC	Dhirendra Nath Sarkar	17,915	44.20	
RSP	Jogendra Nath Roy	14,908	36.78	
JP	Akshoy Kumar Adhikary	6,507	16.05	
Independent	Anath Bandhu Roy	1,204	2.97	
Majority		3,007	7.42	
Turnout		41,331	49.96	
INC hold		Swing		

=== 1972 ===
1972 West Bengal Legislative Assembly election: Kushmandi (SC)
Party	Candidate	Votes	%	±%
INC	Jatindra Mohan Roy	24,403	76.54	
RSP	Jogendra Nath Ray	7,478	23.46	
Majority		16,925	53.08	
Turnout		32,963	49.08	
INC hold		Swing		

=== 1971 ===
1971 West Bengal Legislative Assembly election: Kushmandi (SC)
Party	Candidate	Votes	%	±%
INC	Roy Jatindra Mohan	20,988	52.93	
CPI	Sarker Bhupal Chandra	7,440	18.76	
RSP	Roy Jogendra Nath	5,009	12.63	
CPI(M)	Ashananda Sarkar	4,595	11.59	
INC(O)	Ramani Mohan Sarkar	1,617	4.08	
Majority		13,548	34.17	
Turnout		41,743	63.03	
INC hold		Swing		

=== 1969 ===
1969 West Bengal Legislative Assembly election: Kushmandi (SC)
Party	Candidate	Votes	%	±%
INC	Jatindra Mohan Roy	17,590	50.06	
CPI	Bhupal Chandra Sarkar	17,256	49.11	
NDF	Rajendra Nath Roy Sarkar	295	0.84	
Majority		334	0.95	
Turnout		36,293	57.71	
INC hold		Swing		

=== 1967 ===
1967 West Bengal Legislative Assembly election: Kushmandi (SC)
Party	Candidate	Votes	%	±%
INC	J. M. Roy	12,433	40.18	
CPI	B. C. Sarker	6,580	21.26	
Independent	J. N. Roy	5,797	18.73	
Independent	J. K. R. Chowdhary	5,577	18.02	
Independent	R. N. Roy Sarker	558	1.80	
Majority		5,853	18.92	
Turnout		33,832	52.29	
Swing to INC from CPI		Swing		

=== 1962 ===
1962 West Bengal Legislative Assembly election: Kushmandi
Party	Candidate	Votes	%	±%
CPI	Khalil Sayed	12,679	41.88	
INC	Maharaja Basu	9,135	30.17	
PSP	Majedar Rahaman	5,069	16.74	
SWA	Srikanta Roy	3,395	11.21	
Majority		3,544	11.71	
Turnout		32,186	49.80	
CPI win (new seat)				
