= Malatipur Assembly constituency =

Malatipur
- Constituency No. 47 for the West Bengal Legislative Assembly
- Interactive Map Outlining Malatipur Assembly Constituency

Constituency details
- Country: India
- Region: East India
- State: West Bengal
- District: Malda
- Lok Sabha constituency: Maldaha Uttar
- Established: 2011
- Total electors: 231,907
- Reservation: None

Member of Legislative Assembly
- 18th West Bengal Legislative Assembly
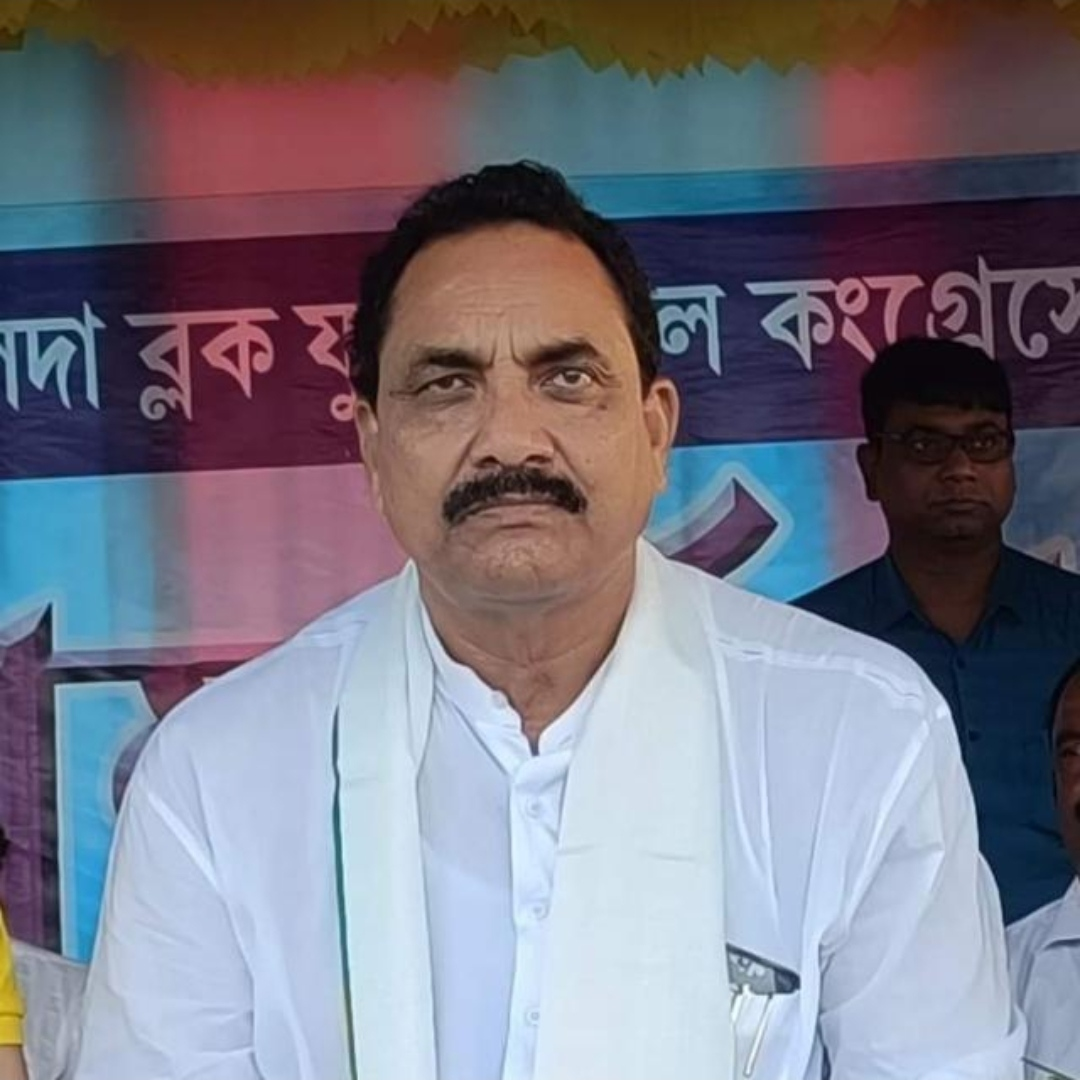
- Incumbent Abdur Rahim Boxi
- Party: Democratic Trinamool Congress
- Elected year: 2026

Malatipur Assembly constituency is an assembly constituency in Malda district in the Indian state of West Bengal.

== Overview ==
Malatipur Assembly constituency consists of 209 booths (parts) among which 144 parts (From part no.1 to part no.144) fall under Chanchal-II Development Block and the rest belongs to Ratua II Development Block. As per orders of the Delimitation Commission, 47 Malatipur Assembly constituency covers Chanchal II community development block and Maharajpur, Peerganj, Sreepur I and Sreepur II gram panchayats of Ratua II community development block.

Malatipur Assembly constituency is part of 7. Maldaha Uttar (Lok Sabha constituency).

== Members of the Legislative Assembly ==
Year	Name	Party
2011	Abdur Rahim Boxi	Revolutionary Socialist Party
2016	Alberuni Zulkarnain	Indian National Congress
2021	Abdur Rahim Boxi	Trinamool Congress
2026	Abdur Rahim Boxi	Trinamool Congress

== Election results ==
=== 2026 ===
2026 West Bengal Legislative Assembly election: Malatipur
Party	Candidate	Votes	%	±%
AITC	Abdur Rahim Boxi	104,123	51.54	▼16.48
INC	Mausam Noor	44,376	21.96	▲11.27
BJP	Ashish Das	43,346	21.45	▲3.01
CPI(M)	Minarul Hossain	6,136	3.04	New entry
NOTA	None of the above	1,453	0.72	▼0.38
Majority		59,747	29.58	▼20.0
Turnout		202,035	94.97	▲14.99
AITC hold		Swing		

=== 2021 ===
2021 West Bengal Legislative Assembly election: Malatipur
Party	Candidate	Votes	%	±%
AITC	Abdur Rahim Boxi	126,157	68.02	▲42.57
BJP	Mousumi Das	34,208	18.44	▲10.19
INC	Alberuni Zulkarnain	19,827	10.69	▼21.58
NOTA	None of the above	2,034	1.10	▼1.01
Majority		91,949	49.58	▲47.92
Turnout		185,484	79.98	▼0.43
AITC gain from INC		Swing		

=== 2016 ===
West Bengal assembly elections, 2016: Malatipur constituency
Party	Candidate	Votes	%	±%
INC	Alberuni Zulkarnain	50,643	32.27	New entry
RSP	Abdur Rahim Boxi	48,043	30.61	▼12.57
AITC	Mohammad Moazzem Hossain	39,947	25.45	▲12.1
BJP	Saumitra Sarkar	12,941	8.25	▲5.04
NOTA	None of the above	3,306	2.11	New entry
BSP	Chaitanya Rabidas	2,059	1.31	▼0.15
Turnout		1,56,939	80.41	▼3.2
INC gain from RSP		Swing		

=== 2011 ===
In the 2011 election, Abdur Rahim Boxi of RSP defeated his nearest rival Alberuni Zulkarnain (Independent).

West Bengal assembly elections, 2011: Malatipur constituency
Party	Candidate	Votes	%	±%
RSP	Abdur Rahim Boxi	54,794	43.18	
Independent	Alberuni Zulkarnain	48,093	37.90	
AITC	Gautam Chakraborti	15,674	12.35	
BJP	Harendra Nath Paul	4,070	3.21	
BSP	Tahida Khatun	1,853		
Independent	Abdul Khaleque	1,652		
Turnout		126,889	83.61	

Alberuni Zulkarnain, contesting as an Independent candidate, was a Congress Zilla Parishad member.
