= Narmada Chandra Roy =

Indian politician (1956–2021)

MLA
- In office 1987–2021
- Preceded by: Dhirendra Nath Sarkar
- Succeeded by: Rekha Roy
- Constituency: Kushmandi

Personal details
- Party: Revolutionary Socialist Party
- Spouse: Gayatri Roy

Narmada Chandra Roy (5 March 1956 – 1 June 2021) was a Revolutionary Socialist Party politician and a seven-time MLA from Kushmandi in Dakshin Dinajpur district.

Born on 5 March 1956 to Jatindranath Roy, he is a graduate.

Roy served as a member of the West Bengal Legislative Assembly from Kushmandi in 1987 till he was defeated in 2021.

He died from COVID-19 in 2021 at the age of 65.
