= Durga Murmu =

Indian politician

Member of the West Bengal Legislative Assembly
- Incumbent
- Assumed office 2 May 2021
- Preceded by: Sunil Chandra Tirkey
- Constituency: Phansidewa

Personal details
- Party: Bharatiya Janata Party
- Education: 12th Pass

Durga Murmu is an Indian politician. He was elected to the West Bengal Legislative Assembly from Phansidewa as a member of the Bharatiya Janata Party. He defeated Choton Kisku of All India Trinamool Congress by 27,711 votes in 2021 West Bengal Assembly election.
