= Rekha Roy =

Indian politician

Member of the West Bengal Legislative Assembly
- In office 2 May 2021 – 4 May 2026
- Preceded by: Narmada Chandra Roy
- Succeeded by: Tapas Chandra Roy
- Constituency: Kushmandi

Personal details
- Party: Trinamool Congress

Rekha Roy is an Indian politician. She was elected to the West Bengal Legislative Assembly from Kushmandi as a member of the Trinamool Congress.
