= Sunil Chandra Tirkey =

Indian politician

Minister of State for Consumer Affairs
- In office 20 May 2011 – September 2012

Member of the West Bengal Legislative Assembly
- In office 13 May 2011 – 2 May 2021
- Preceded by: Choton Kisku
- Succeeded by: Durga Murmu
- Constituency: Phansidewa

Personal details
- Party: Indian National Congress

Sunil Chandra Tirkey is an Indian politician and was the Minister of State for Consumer Affairs in the Government of West Bengal. He was the MLA of Phansidewa constituency from 2011 to 2021.

He resigned from the ministry when Congress withdrew its support to the Mamata Banerjee government in September 2012.

== Electoral Performance ==
=== 2021 ===
2021 West Bengal Legislative Assembly election: Phansidewa (ST) constituency
| Party | Candidate | Votes | % | ±% |
|---|---|---|---|---|
| BJP | Durga Murmu | 1,05,651 | 50.89 | Winner |
| AITC | Choton Kisku | 77,940 | 37.55 | |
| INC | Sunil Chandra Tirkey | 12,815 | 6.17 | |
| CPI(ML)L | Sumanti Ekka | 2,787 | 1.34 | |
| BSP | Karuna Ranjan Soren | 2,291 | 1.10 | |
| SUCI(C) | Bhola Tirki | 1,832 | 0.88 | |
| BTP | Amit Lakra | 1,699 | 0.82 | |
| None of the Above | None of the Above | 2,575 | 1.24 | |
| Majority | | 27,711 | 13.34 | |
| Turnout | | 2,07,590 | 86.32 | |
| BJP gain from INC | | Swing | | |

=== 2016 ===
2016 West Bengal Legislative Assembly election: Phansidewa (ST) constituency
| Party | Candidate | Votes | % | ±% |
|---|---|---|---|---|
| INC | Sunil Chandra Tirkey | 73,158 | 40.35 | Winner |
| AITC | Carolus Lakra | 66,084 | 36.45 | |
| BJP | Durga Murmu | 32,894 | 18.14 | |
| Independent | Jemshan Tirkey | 2,072 | 1.14 | |
| CPI(ML)L | Lalu Oraon | 1,596 | 0.88 | |
| BMP | Bikash Birju | 1,474 | 0.81 | |
| Independent | Sushil Lakra | 1,373 | 0.75 | |
| None of the Above | None of the Above | 2,629 | 1.45 | |
| Majority | | 7,074 | 3.90 | |
| Turnout | | 1,81,280 | 87.85 | |
| INC hold | | Swing | | |

=== 2011 ===
2011 West Bengal Legislative Assembly election: Phansidewa (ST) constituency
| Party | Candidate | Votes | % | ±% |
|---|---|---|---|---|
| INC | Sunil Chandra Tirkey | 61,388 | 42.55 | Winner |
| CPI(M) | Choton Kisku | 59,151 | 41.00 | |
| Rashtriya Deshaj Party | Junas Kerketta | 7,536 | 5.22 | |
| BJP | Dila Saibo | 5,734 | 3.97 | |
| KPP | Helarius Ekka | 4,114 | 2.85 | |
| CPI(ML)L | Kandra Murmu | 2,138 | 1.48 | |
| Independent | Sudhir Tirki | 1,896 | 1.31 | |
| CPI(ML)L | Ram Ganesh Baraik | 1,286 | 0.89 | |
| SUCI(C) | Bhola Tirki | 1,028 | 0.71 | |
| Majority | | 2,237 | 1.58 | |
| Turnout | | 1,44,271 | 87.49 | |
| INC gain from CPI(M) | | Swing | | |
