= Jana Andolan Party =

Political party in India

Jana Andolan Party (JAP) is a political party based in Kalimpong district and Darjeeling district of India. JAP was founded in 2016. The president of the party is Dr. Harka Bahadur Chhetri, who is a former MLA of Kalimpong.

== Election history ==
JAP contested the West Bengal state assembly election from Kalimpong in 2016. Its candidate Harka Bahadur Chhetri lost narrowly to Gorkha Janmukti Morcha candidate Sarita Rai. In the 2017 Kalimpong municipality elections, JAP won two seats. In 2019, Harka Bahadur Chhetri unsuccessfully contested the Lok Sabha election from Darjeeling constituency. Amar Lama from JAP contested the West Bengal assembly by-election from Darjeeling assembly constituency in 2019 but lost.
