= Choton Kisku =

Indian politician

MLA of Phansidewa Vidhan Sabha Constituency
- In office 2006–2011
- Preceded by: Prakash Minz
- Succeeded by: Sunil Chandra Tirkey

Personal details
- Party: All India Trinamool Congress

Choton Kisku is an Indian politician belonging to All India Trinamool Congress. He was elected as MLA of Phansidewa Vidhan Sabha Constituency in West Bengal Legislative Assembly in 2006 as a Communist Party of India (Marxist) Candidate.
