= Abdur Rahim Boxi =

Indian politician

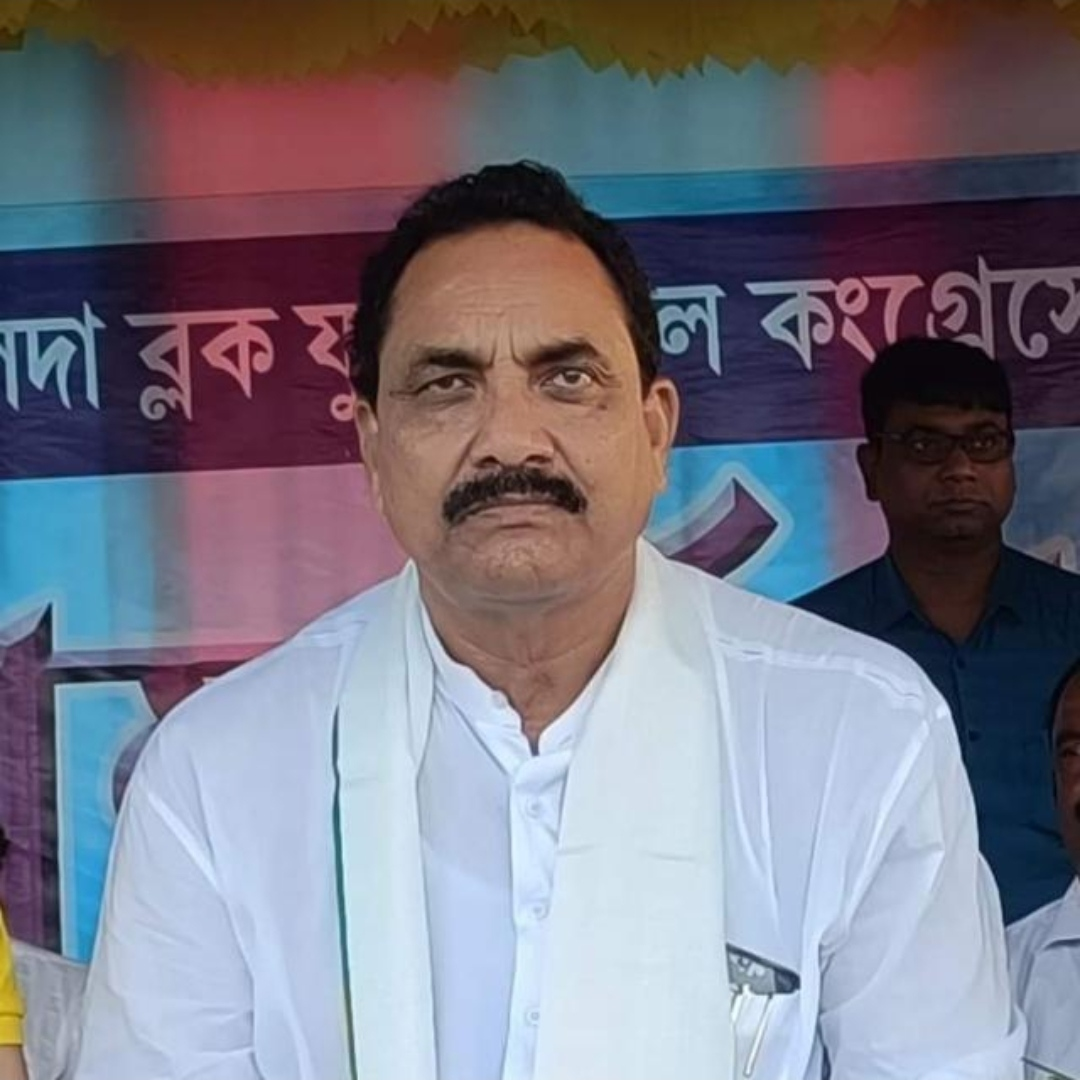

Member of the West Bengal Legislative Assembly
- Incumbent
- Assumed office 2 May 2021
- Constituency: Malatipur
- In office 2011–2016
- Preceded by: Constituency established

Personal details
- Born: 8 April 1963 (age 63) Baharal, Malda
- Party: Democratic Trinamool Congress
- Spouse: Ayesha Khatun
- Children: Najma Khatun, Babu Boxi, Asifa Sabnam, Rana Boxi

Abdur Rahim Boxi is an Indian politician belonging to All India Trinamool Congress. He was elected as a member of West Bengal Legislative Assembly from Malatipur in 2021. He joined All India Trinamool Congress from Revolutionary Socialist Party on 11 January 2019. He is also a District President of Malda district TMC.
