= Prashant Tamang =

Indian singer and film actor (1983–2026)

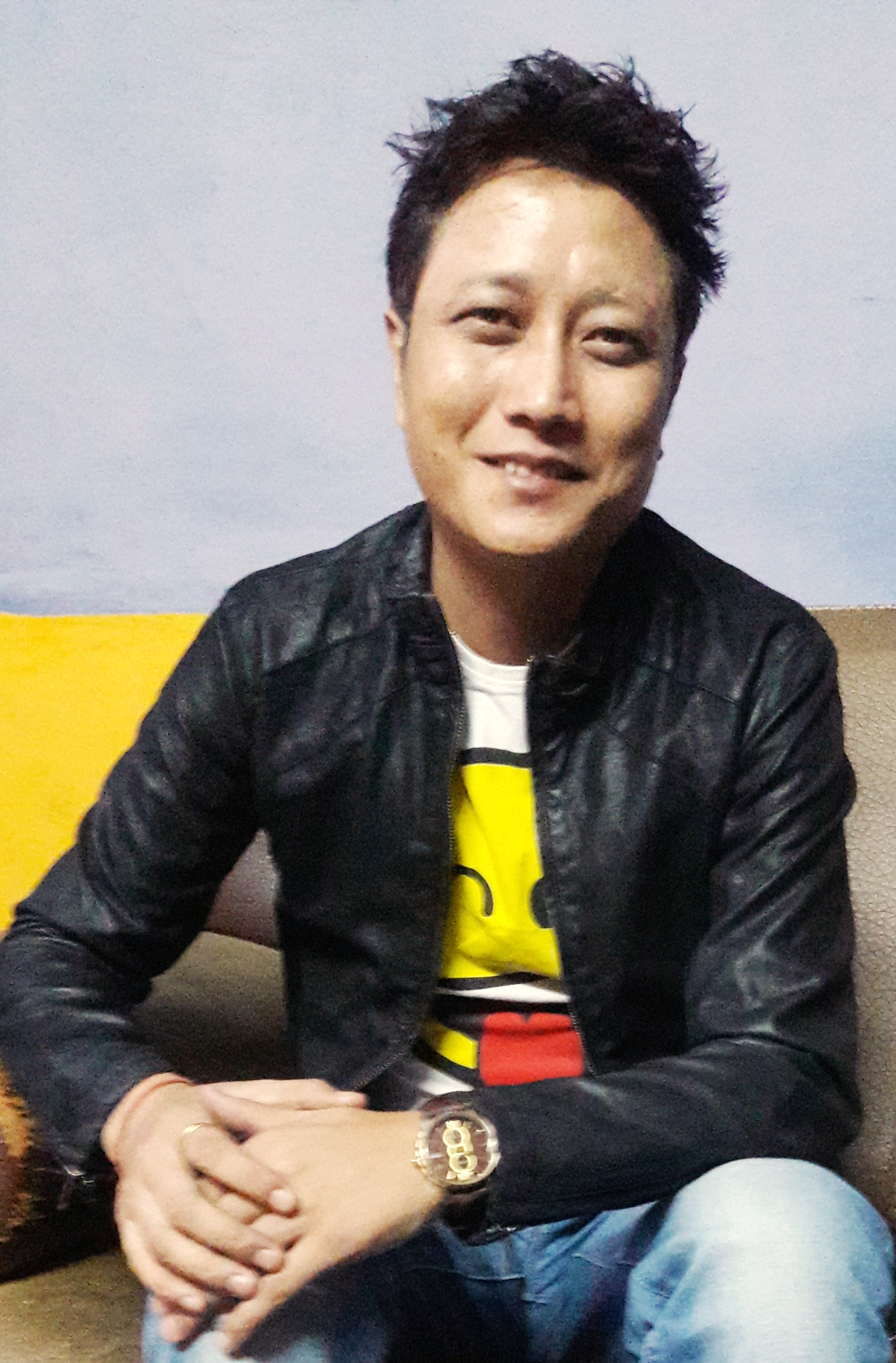
- Tamang in 2015

Background information
- Born: 4 January 1983; Darjeeling, West Bengal, India
- Died: 11 January 2026 (aged 43) New Delhi, India
- Genre: Pop
- Occupations: Singer, actor
- Instruments: Vocals, guitar, drums
- Years active: 2007–2026

Prashant Tamang (4 January 1983 – 11 January 2026) was an Indian singer and film actor based in Kathmandu. He was the winner of Indian Idol Season 3 in 2007.

== Background ==
Prashant Tamang was born in Darjeeling, West Bengal, India to Rupa Tamang and Madan Tamang and studied at St Robert School. After the death of his father in an accident, Tamang left school and joined the Kolkata Police as a constable in his father's place. In the Kolkata Police, he sang for the police orchestra. His family included his grandmother, mother and his sister, Archana. He married Geeta Thapa (Martha Alley), who is a flight attendant, on 16 February 2011 in Nagaland, India.

== Indian Idol ==
According to the Indian Idol programme commentary, Tamang auditioned for Indian Idol 3 (2007) because his friends and his seniors, especially Mr. Zulfiqar Hasan, Special Additional Commissioner of Police (who incidentally also got Tamang's leave sanctioned for the competition) told him that his voice was very good. He auditioned for Indian Idol in Kolkata and was subsequently chosen for the next rounds. He received mixed comments from judges for his performances. He is the only contestant to have never been in the bottom three or four of the gala round. Tamang made it to the top two of Indian Idol 3 along with Amit Paul. Tamang got about 10 times more votes (70 million votes) than Amit in the final and went on to win the Indian Idol contest. He won 10 million Indian rupees cash prize and a Maruti Suzuki SX4 as the winner of Indian Idol.

=== Voting for Indian Idol ===
After entering the Indian Idol contest, Tamang became a celebrity in West Bengal, Sikkim and particularly in the Darjeeling hills. People from Kolkata, Sikkim and Nepalese population living all around the world voted overwhelmingly for Tamang in the contest. The mayor of Mirik vowed to spend Rs. 10,000 and his staff vowed to spend a month's salary in SMS voting for Prashant Tamang. People of Nepalese origin working in Brunei, the UK, Hong Kong, the United Arab Emirates and other countries sent money to vote for him in India.

Travel was organised in Howrah, Kolkata in his support, some of which were attended by his sister, mother, and grandmother. In Pokhara, Nepal, Radio Annapurna (93.4 MHz) campaigned for collecting donations and the collected sum of NRs. seventy-thousand donations were sent to Darjeeling through its representative to vote for Tamang. A signature campaign for his support was organised by Himalaya Darpan (a Nepali newspaper) in Kolkata. Schools, clubs and other organisations asked people to support and vote for Tamang, who was named "पहाडको गौरव" (Pahad Ko Gaurav) meaning "Pride of the Hills". Two cabinet ministers from Sikkim, G.M. Gurung and S.B. Subedi, planted tree saplings at Singtam to pledge the Sikkimese support for Tamang and to show the unity of the Nepalese community in Sikkim and Kolkata. The Minister of Sports & Youth Affairs of Sikkim, P.S. Golay, also supported the statewide voting for Tamang.

=== Support from Kolkata Police ===
Tamang, a constable in the Kolkata Police, was supported by the officials of his department. Zulfiqar Hasan (Special ACP), visibly ecstatic with Tamang's triumph, in his interview after the announcement of the result, told that he was confident that Tamang would win and he and his team supported Tamang at every stage of the competition. According to reports, a couple of policemen even stayed awake through the nights to vote for Tamang. Hasan said, "Given the hard worker he is, Tamang deserved this title. He has no formal training in music, but he has been chosen the new Indian Idol. This proves how dedicated he is towards whatever he does."

=== Bimal Gurung and Gorkhaland movement ===
Bimal Gurung, a former councillor of the Darjeeling Gorkha Hill Council, led a successful campaign for voting for Tamang in Indian Idol 3. His campaign gained huge support and popularity from the people of Darjeeling. Riding on the wave of this mass support, Bimal was able to move the campaign to a political angle and overthrow Subhash Ghisingh, the GNLF leader and caretaker of DGHC, from power. Bimal Gurung went on to found a new party called Gorkha Janmukti Morcha that renewed the demand for a state of Gorkhaland in India.

=== Red FM controversy ===
A radio jockey Jonathan Brady (also known as Nitin) of Red FM, an FM radio channel in Delhi, commented in a live broadcast in his show that "shopkeepers will now have to make their own security arrangements as Gorkhas have taken to singing" when referring to Tamang, who is a Gorkhali, singing in the Indian Idol 3 contest. This led to massive protests from Gorkhas all over and especially in Darjeeling district, where violent clashes erupted between supporters of Tamang and local residents of Siliguri. The Gorkhas demanded that the RJ be taken off the FM channel. The Government of India issued a show-cause notice to Red FM for the racial slur. Red FM issued a clarification stating that "We have not intentionally caused hurt to the sentiments of any person or any particular community, caste or creed. However in the event an inadvertent slight or offence has been caused to the sentiments of any person or community we tender our apology for the same".

== After Indian Idol ==
After winning Indian Idol 3, Tamang launched his maiden album Dhanyavad (meaning "Thank You"), consisting of Nepali and Hindi songs, with Sony BMG. Prashant toured all over the world, including the USA, performing in concerts. He also sang for a few Nepali films such as Himmat 2 (along with fellow Indian Idol contestant Charu Semwal).

== Films ==
In 2009, Tamang started his acting career in Nepali films. His first film Gorkha Paltan was released in 2010. Gorkha Paltan did very well at the box office. His second film Angalo Yo Maya Ko, produced in Sikkim, was released on 31 March 2011. Kina Maya Ma, Prashant's third film, was released in 2011. His fourth Nepali film Nishani, based on the bravery of the Gorkhas in the Kargil War, was released in 2014.

== Filmography ==
Year	Title	Role	Other notes
2010	Gorkha Paltan		Also did playback singing in the film
2011	Angalo Yo Maya Ko		Also did playback singing in the film
2011	Kina Maya Ma		
2014	Nishani		Hit
2015	Pardesi		Blockbuster
2016	Ye Maya Hanaima		
2026	Maatrubhumi: May War Rest in Peace		This film marks his final screen appearance, as he tragically passed away in January 2026.

=== Television ===
Year	Title	Role	Other notes
2007	Amber Dhara		Guest appearance as celebrity himself
2025	Paatal Lok	Daniel Acho	

== Death ==
Tamang's death was reported on 11 January 2026. According to reports he had recently returned from live performance in New Delhi. No known health issues had been reported.
