= Gorkhaland movement =

Campaign for a new state in India

Gorkhaland Territorial Administration

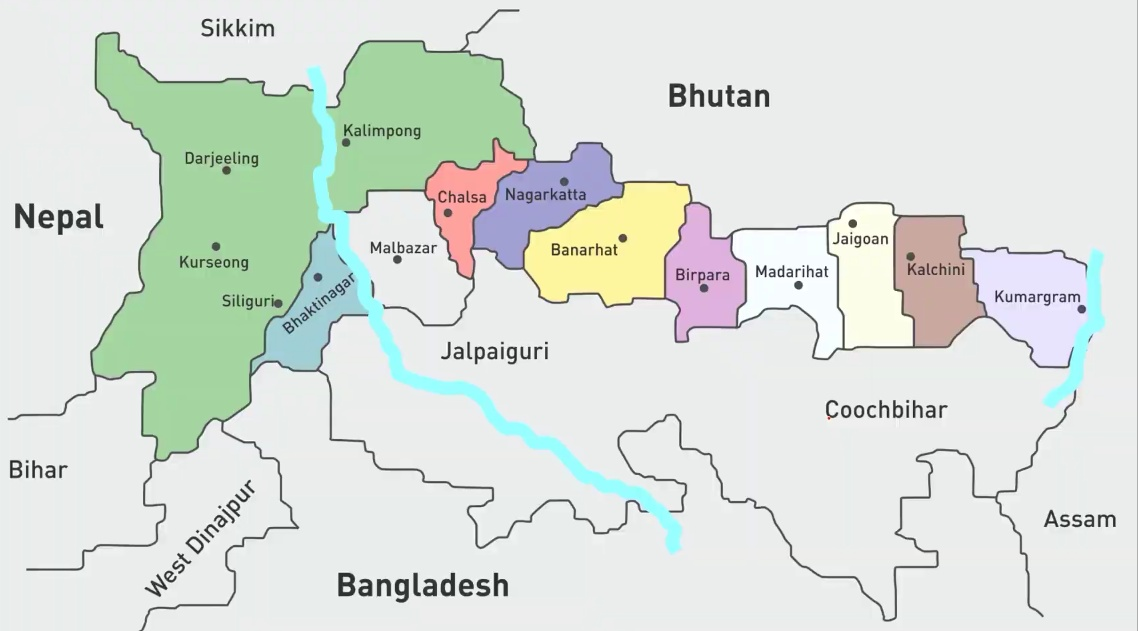
Proposed Gorkhaland state

The Gorkhaland movement is a political movement seeking the creation of a separate state within India, comprising the Nepali-speaking-majority areas of northern West Bengal. The proposed state would include the hill regions of Darjeeling and Kalimpong districts, as well as parts of the Dooars and Terai regions, including areas of Jalpaiguri, Alipurduar, and Cooch Behar districts. The demand for a separate administrative unit in Darjeeling dates back to 1909, when the Hillmen's Association submitted a memorandum to the Minto–Morley Reforms seeking a separate administrative arrangement.

Gorkhaland, as the new state will be called, is expected to have a total land mass covering more than 7,500 km². This makes Gorkhaland bigger than the states of Goa and Sikkim in India. Population wise, the state is expected to be inhabited by more than 4 million people which can be compared to Manipur and Tripura. According to demographic calculations, the state is not expected to be majority Nepali-speaking. This is because the most spoken language in the hills will be Nepali accounting for 40% of the population in Darjeeling district while 51% of Kalimpong district speaks Nepali. In Dooars and Terai areas, 15-20% of the population claims Nepali to be their native language. In total, Nepali speaking people are expected to account for about 35% of the total population, while the rest is divided among Rajbongshis (25%), Adivasis (20%), Bengalis (15%) and others like Totos, Mechs and Biharis (5%).

== History ==
Most residents of the Darjeeling district belong to the communities of Gorkhas, Lepchas, and Bhutias who have traditionally been known as the "Hill People". In the early twentieth century, some members of these groups, especially the Gorkhas, were not satisfied with the existing administrative system and started demanding a separate administrative system for their district. The demand for a separate administrative system for Darjeeling was first made way back in 1907. In 1917, this movement got organized through the establishment of the Hillmen’s Association that sent various memorials requesting the administrative separation of Darjeeling from the Bengal Presidency. The slogan used by this association was "Nepali, Bhutia, Lepcha hami sabai Gorkhali" meaning "Nepali, Bhutia and Lepcha - we are all Gorkhali."

The formation of the All India Gorkha League (AIGL) in 1943 gave this movement a sense of direction, and the momentum started gathering as the ex-soldiers returned from World War II.

These calls for secession from Bengal has been around since the early 1900s; however, they gained national prominence right at the start of the 1980s.

The formation of Pranta Parishad took place on 8 August 1980 in the Darjeeling hills. It sought the establishment of an independent state of Gorkhaland consisting of the whole of Darjeeling district and Nepali-speaking regions of the Dooars in Jalpaiguri district, under the provisions of Article 3 of the Constitution of India.

In the 1980s, Subhash Ghisingh raised the demand for the creation of a state called Gorkhaland within India to be carved out of the hills of Darjeeling and areas of Dooars and Siliguri Terai contiguous to Darjeeling. The demand took a violent turn, which led to the death of over 1,200 people.

The police fired on an agitation meeting of the Gorkha National Liberation Front (GNLF) held on 27 July 1986 at the Mela Ground of 9th Mile, Kalimpong. Thirteen persons were killed, while 38 others were wounded in this incident. This day is observed every year as 'Shahid Diwas' or Martyrs' Day in Darjeeling-Kalimpong hills.

The agitation ended in 1988 after the Government of India, the Government of West Bengal, and the GNLF signed an agreement establishing the Darjeeling Gorkha Hill Council (DGHC), an autonomous administrative body for the Darjeeling hills. The DGHC administered the Darjeeling hills for 23 years with some degree of autonomy. In August 1988, the Darjeeling Gorkha Hill Council (DGHC) came into existence with Ghisingh as the Chairman.

Nepali language was incorporated in the Eighth Schedule in 1992.

The fourth DGHC elections were due in 2004. However, the government decided not to hold elections and instead made Subhash Ghisingh the sole caretaker of the DGHC till a new Sixth Schedule tribal council was established.

In early 2005, Subhash Ghisingh came up with the idea of incorporating the DGHC within the Sixth Schedule of the Constitution. Under the Sixth Schedule of the Constitution of India, autonomous administration is provided to some of the tribal regions under Article 244 of the Constitution of India. This is done with the aim of protecting the interests of the tribes. Pradhan, Alina (2012). "Politics of Separation: The Case of the Gorkhaland Movement". The Indian Journal of Political Science. 73 (4). Indian Political Science Association: 683–690. JSTOR 41858876.

Resentment among the former councillors of DGHC grew rapidly. Among them, Bimal Gurung, once the trusted aide of Ghising, decided to break away from the GNLF. Riding on a mass support for Prashant Tamang, an Indian Idol contestant from Darjeeling, Bimal quickly capitalized on the public support he received for supporting Prashant, and was able to overthrow Ghisingh from the seat of power. He went on to found the Gorkha Janmukti Morcha raising the demand a state of Gorkhaland.[10][11]

The demand for Gorkhaland took a new turn with the assassination of Madan Tamang, leader of Akhil Bharatiya Gorkha League. He was brutally beheaded on a broad-day light allegedly by Gorkha Janmukti Morcha supporters on 21 May 2010, in Darjeeling, which led to a spontaneous shutdown in the three Darjeeling hill sub-divisions of Darjeeling, Kalimpong and Kurseong. After the murder of Madan Tamang, the West Bengal government threatened action against Gorkha Janmukti Morcha, whose senior leaders are named in the FIR, meanwhile hinting discontinuation of ongoing talks over interim arrangement with the Gorkha party, saying it had "lost popular support following the assassination".

On 8 February 2011, three GJM activists were shot dead (one of whom succumbed to her injuries later) by the police as they tried to enter Jalpaiguri district on a padyatra led by Bimal Gurung from Gorubathan to Jaigaon. This led to violence in the Darjeeling hills and an indefinite strike was called by GJM that lasted 9 days.

In the 2011 West Bengal state assembly election held on 18 April 2011, GJM candidates won three Darjeeling hill assembly seats, proving that the demand for Gorkhaland was still strong in Darjeeling. GJM candidates Trilok Dewan won from Darjeeling constituency , Harka Bahadur Chhetri from Kalimpong constituency, and Rohit Sharma from Kurseong constituency. Wilson Champramari, an independent candidate supported by GJM, also won from Kalchini constituency in the Dooars.

=== 2013 agitation ===
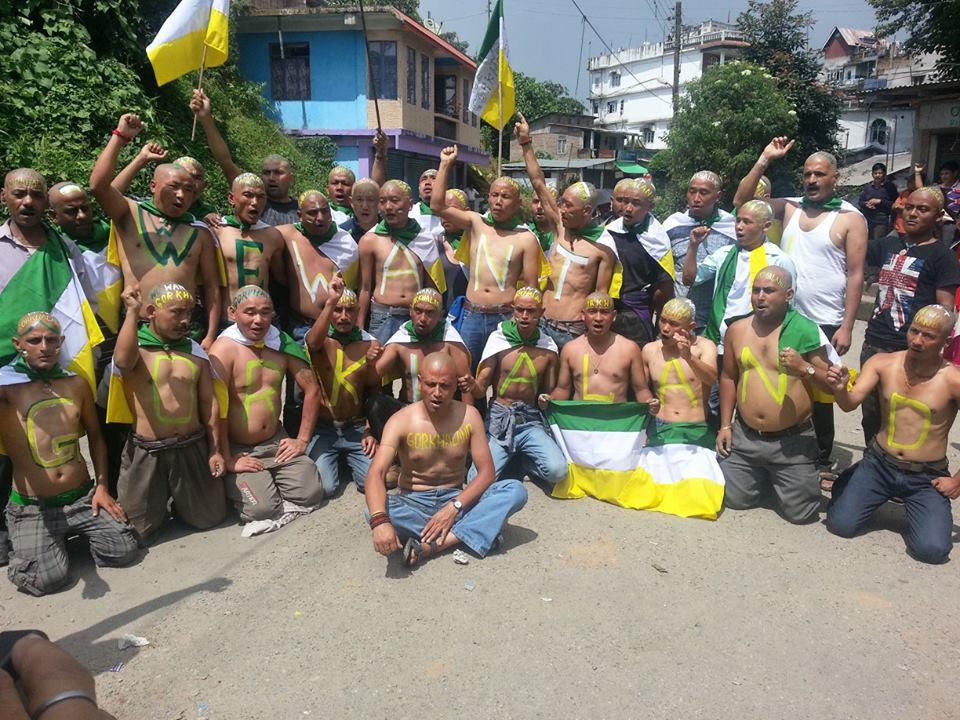
Gorkhaland supporters demonstrating in Mirik, Darjeeling

Women supporting Gorkhaland marching with torchlights, Darjeeling, 2013.

On 30 July 2013, the Congress Working Committee unanimously passed a resolution to recommend the formation of a separate Telangana state from Andhra Pradesh to the INC-led central government. This resulted in flaring up of demands throughout India, prominent among them were the demands for statehood for Gorkhaland in West Bengal and Bodoland in Assam.

Following a 3 days bandh, GJM announced an indefinite bandh from 3 August. Largely peaceful, political development took place in the background. With the West Bengal government armed with Calcutta high court order declaring the bandh as illegal, the government toughened its stand by sending a total of 10 companies of paramilitary force to quell any violent protest and arresting prominent GJM leaders and workers. In response GJM announced a unique form of protest 'Janta Bandh', in which with no picketing or the use of force, the people in the hills were asked to voluntarily stay inside on 13 and 14 August. This proved to be a major success and an embarrassment for the government.

After a marathon 'all party meeting' convened by the Gorkha Janamukti Morcha (GJM) on 16 August at Darjeeling, the pro Gorkhaland parties informally formed 'Gorkhaland Joint Action Committee'.

=== 2017 agitation ===
There were a few clashes between the police and the agitators initially. Strikes were called on a few occasions. The situation worsened on 15 June, when the police raided a GJM office and seized spade, sickle, bow, arrow, hoe, and shovel. This was followed by violent clashes between the police and the agitators. And following this, the GJM called an indefinite strike and shut down in the region.The Police raided Bimal Gurung's offices and hideouts across the Darjeeling Hills several times and arrested several of the protestors.

There were instances of violence including riots, arson, torching of vehicles, government properties and houses. In one of these protests, the Darjeeling Himalayan Railway was torched by the protesters. Mass rallies were taken out regularly by the supporters of the Gorkhaland agitation. There have been multiple injuries of both the Gorkhaland supporters and security personnel. A total of 11 people have died in the protests till date. The internet services of the region were also suspended by the government for the duration of the shutdown. There were complaints of the violation of human rights in the region, and an APDR (Association for the Protection of Democratic Rights) team was sent to the region to investigate the issue.

On 9 July, the protests reach New Delhi. Supporters staged a march from Raj Ghat to Jantar Mantar. This was followed by the GJM rejecting the State Government’s offer of talks. On 29 August, the state Government called a meeting with the hill parties. But the meeting was fruitless and they could not arrive at a conclusion. This was followed by another round of talks where there was a consensus to end the shutdown. The supporters met the Home Minister on 19 September. This was followed by the hills slowly returning to normalcy. On 26 September, internet services were restored in the region. Then on 27 September, GJM headed by new chairperson Binay Tamang finally called off the strike after 104 days.

Even after the strike was called off, there were a few stray incidents of violence and protests in the region. But the region as a whole was much calmer than before. And so on 27 October, the Supreme Court directed the Centre to withdraw 7 of the 15 central armed forces deployed in the region.

Gurung stayed in hiding between 2017 and 2020 because of the registration of cases against him under the Unlawful Activities (Prevention) Act (UAPA) and others for the unrest that occurred in the Darjeeling hills in 2017.

== Gorkhaland Territorial Administration ==
The memorandum of agreement for the formation of a Gorkhaland Territorial Administration (GTA), a semi-autonomous administrative body for the Darjeeling hills, was signed on 18 July 2011. Earlier, during the West Bengal assembly election (2011) campaign, Mamata Banerjee had said that Darjeeling is an integrated part of Bengal. While Mamata implied that this would be the end of the Gorkhaland movement, Bimal Gurung reiterated that this was just another step towards statehood. Both spoke publicly at the same venue in Pintail Village near Siliguri, where the tripartite agreement was signed. A bill for the creation of GTA was passed in the West Bengal Legislative Assembly on 2 September 2011. The West Bengal government issued a gazette notification for the GTA Act on 14 March 2012, signalling preparations for elections for the GTA. In the elections of the GTA held on 29 July 2012, GJM candidates won from 17 constituencies and the rest 28 seats unopposed. After an agitation of about two years, the GJM also agreed to the setting up of another autonomous body, called Gorkhaland Territorial Administration. Gurung is currently the chief executive of the GTA. However, over the last few months, the GJM has expressed severe dissatisfaction over the functioning of the GTA and have revived the call for the separate state of Gorkhaland.

On 30 July 2013, Gurung resigned from the GTA citing both interference from the West Bengal government and the renewed agitation for Gorkhaland.

== Regional political parties in Gorkhaland ==
- Gorkha Janmukti Morcha (GJM)
- Gorkha National Liberation Front (GNLF)
- Bharatiya Gorkha Prajatantrik Morcha (BGPM)
- Indian Gorkha Janshakti Front (IGJF)
- Akhil Bharatiya Gorkha League (ABGL)
- Communist Party of Revolutionary Marxists (CPRM)
- Gorkha Rashtriya Congress (GRC)
- Jana Andolan Party (JAP)

== See also ==
- Kamtapur Liberation Organisation
- Bodoland Territorial Region
- Gurkha
- Indian Gorkha
- Nepalese people
- Gorkha Kingdom
- Gurkha War
