= Bimal Gurung =

Indian politician

Personal details
- Born: 17 July 1964 (age 62) Pathley Bash
- Party: Gorkha Janmukti Morcha
- Children: 6
- Website: bimalgurung.in

Bimal Gurung is an Indian politician and one of the founders and the president of the Gorkha Janmukti Morcha (GJM), a political party demanding the formation of a separate state of Gorkhaland within India. He is the 1st chief executive member of Gorkhaland Territorial Administration, which is a semi-autonomous body that governs the hilly areas or Darjeeling District Kalimpong District and the partial terai region in the state of West Bengal.

Gurung had been in hiding in 2017 till 2020 for fear of being arrested under the Unlawful Activities (Prevention) Act after he and his aides were allegedly held accountable for breach of peace in the Darjeeling hills.

== DGHC ==
Bimal Gurung was formerly a Gorkha Volunteers Corps member who fought for the creation of a Gorkhaland state in India during 1986-1988 under the Gorkha National Liberation Front (GNLF). He contested Independently in the by-election and was elected as a councillor representing Tukver constituency in the Darjeeling Gorkha Hill Council (DGHC) after the previous councillor Rudra Pradhan was murdered in Darjeeling. Later on, he became a close aide of Subhash Ghisingh, the leader of GNLF and chairman of DGHC. In 2007, he turned against his mentor to launch the second agitation for a Gorkhaland state.

== Sixth Schedule ==
The fourth DGHC elections were due in 2004. However, the government decided not to hold elections and instead made Subhash Ghisingh the sole caretaker of the DGHC till the Sixth Schedule council was established. Most of the other political parties and organisations opposed the setting up of a Sixth Schedule Tribal Council as there was only a minority tribal population in the DGHC area. Resentment among the former councillors of DGHC also grew rapidly. Among them, Bimal Gurung decided to break away from the GNLF. Riding on a mass support for Prashant Tamang, an Indian Idol candidate from Darjeeling in 2007, Bimal quickly capitalised on the public support he received for supporting Prashant, and was able to overthrow Ghisingh from the seat of power. Ghisingh resigned from the chairmanship of the DGHC in March 2008 and shifted residence to Jalpaiguri. GNLF lost most of its support and cadres to Gorkha Janmukti Morcha, a new party headed by Bimal Gurung.

== Gorkhaland demand ==
Immediately upon formation of GJM, Bimal renewed the demand of the formation of a Gorkhaland state comprising the Darjeeling district and many areas of the Dooars. The total area of the proposed state is 6450 km^{2} and comprises Banarhat, Bhaktinagar, Birpara, Chalsa, Darjeeling, Jaigaon, Kalchini, Kalimpong, Kumargram, Kurseong, Madarihat, Malbazar, Mirik and Nagarkatta. Unlike the 1980s, GJM has maintained that the struggle for Gorkhaland would be through non-violence and non-cooperation. Bimal received mass support from the people of Darjeeling district, Dooars and other parts of India for his statehood demand.

But after the contentious issue of the broad-daylight murder of former ABGL chief Madan Tamang in May 2010, to which Gurung is believed to be heavily linked, many key GJM leaders such as Trilok Dewan, Amar Singh Rai, Amar Lama, Anmole Prasad and Palden Lama resigned from the party, leading to massive speculation about the veracity of Gurung's statement denying his party's links with Tamang's murder.

Darjeeling returned to normalcy in 2011 after TMC-INC coalition government came to power in West Bengal. Tripartite GTA agreement was signed between the government of India, West Bengal government, and GJM in 2011. But it seems short lived and GJM has again raised the issue of Gorkhaland & given call for an indefinite bandh in Darjeeling in June 2017.

Gurung's GJM was demanding a separate Gorkha state and in 2017 a massive agitation began which also turned violent. Because of Gurung's mishandling, the situation turned disastrous in which 10 people lost their lives in alleged police firing. When Gurung was on the run, the GJM broke up. Mamata Banerjee was successful in quelling the violent agitation after engineering a split between Bimal Gurung and Binay Tamang, a close aide to Gurung. Tamang alleged that Gurung wanted to get him killed and extended support to TMC along with his faction. Mamata Banerjee appointed Tamang as the chairperson of Gorkhaland Territorial Administration (GTA) on 20 September 2017. The state government slapped Gurung with a number of cases under laws relating to terrorism. Banerjee criticised Rajnath Singh, the then Union Home Minister, for holding a meeting with GJM leaders. Attempting to get Gurung behind the bars, the West Bengal police ran several operations in the hills which resulted in the killing of a few officers. One of the slain police officers was Sub-Inspector Amitabha Mullick. The Gurung faction helped BJP candidate Raju Bista win the 2019 Lok Sabha election.

The Calcutta High Court directed both factions of the GJM not to use the party symbol to contest polls.

In October 2020, Gurung's GJM quitted NDA and allied with TMC before the upcoming 2021 West Bengal Legislative Assembly election. After being on the run for three years, Bimal Gurung resurfaced and announced unconditional support to Mamata Banerjee for the 2021 elections. He said that while Mamata Banerjee always kept her promises, the BJP never kept its word. The Banerjee government cleared their stance on the Gorkhaland issue by not supporting the demand for a separate state. Trinamool Congress allotted three seats (Kalimpong, Darjeeling, Kurseong) in the hills to GJM. Leaders of the Gurung faction had earlier promised to back the TMC in the rest of the 14 seats in Darjeeling, Jalpaiguri and Alipurduar districts. Even though both factions of the GJM (one led by Gurung and another led by Tamang) extended their support to TMC for the 2021 assembly election, they remained divided and both declared to field their candidates in each of the three seats which were allotted to them. As a result, the GJM faction headed by Tamang won only one out of three seats. In July 2021, Binay Tamang announced his resignation from all positions of the party and handed over flags of the party to Gurung.
