= Darjeeling district =

District in West Bengal, India

- District of West Bengal
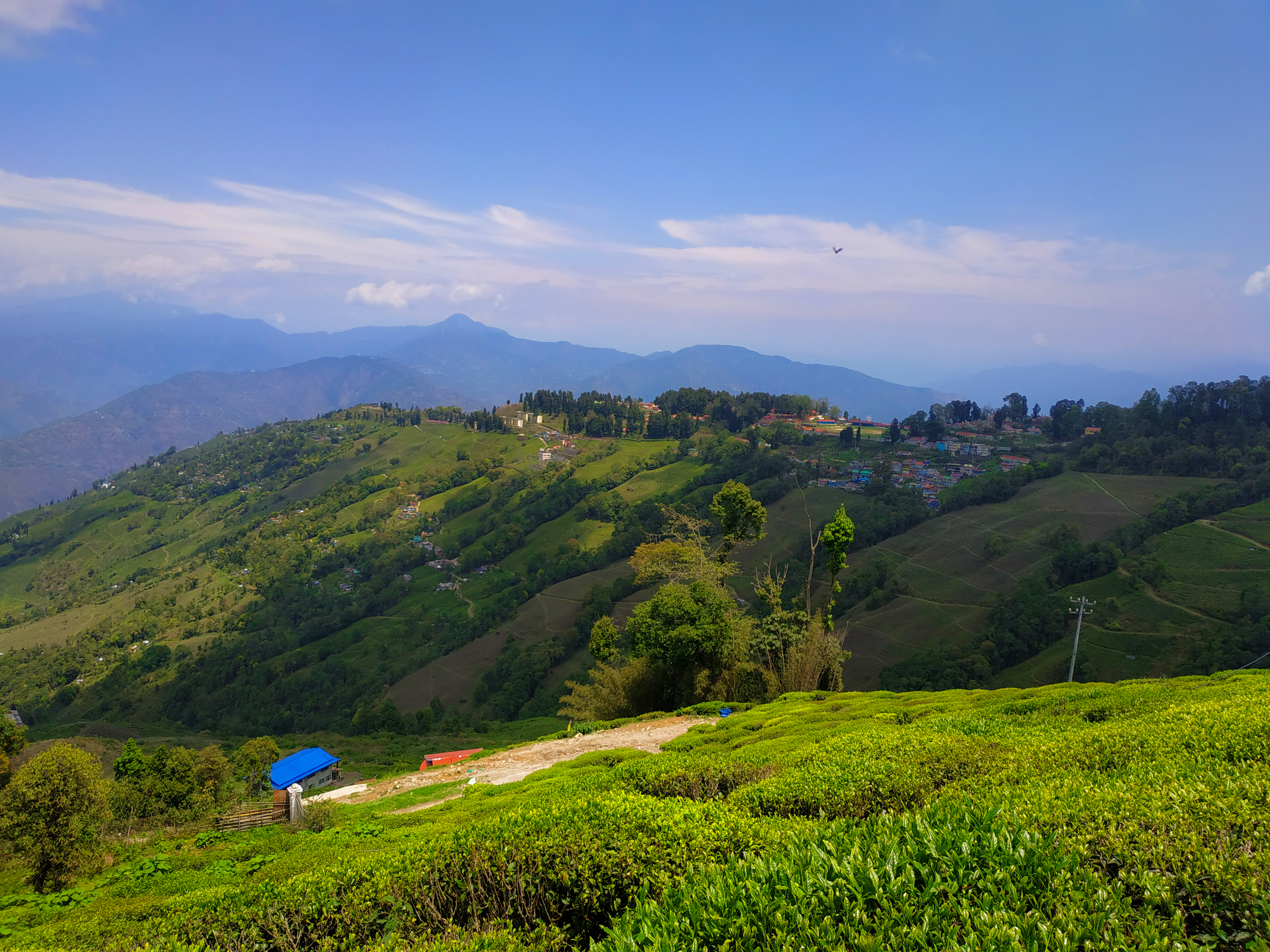
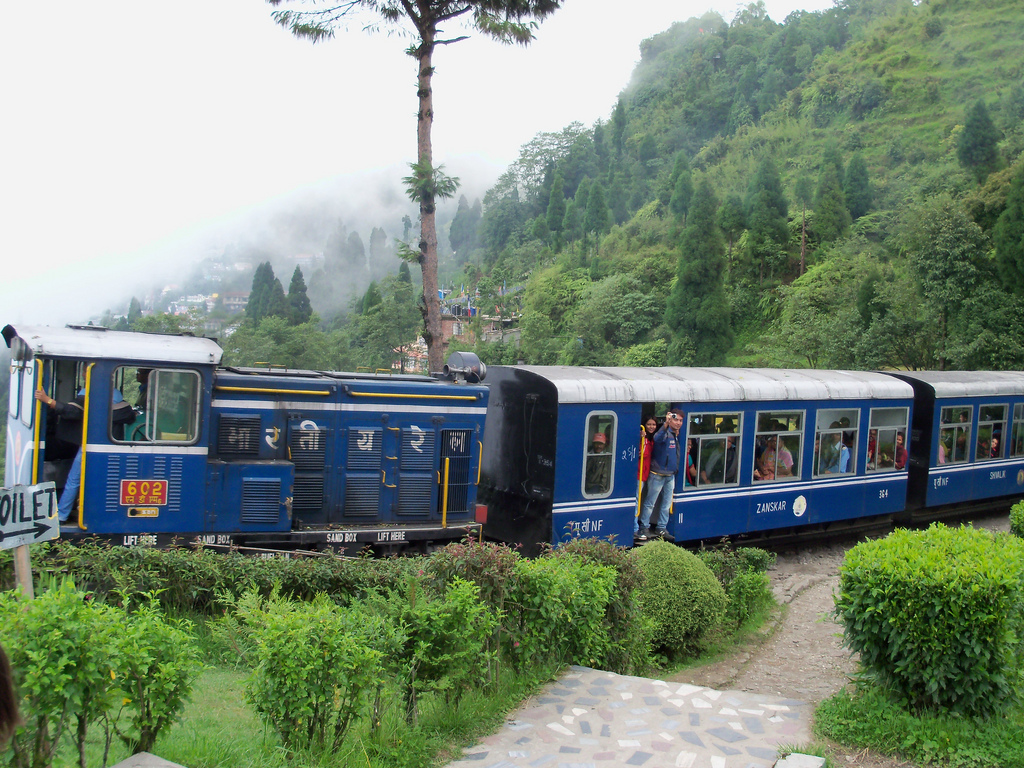
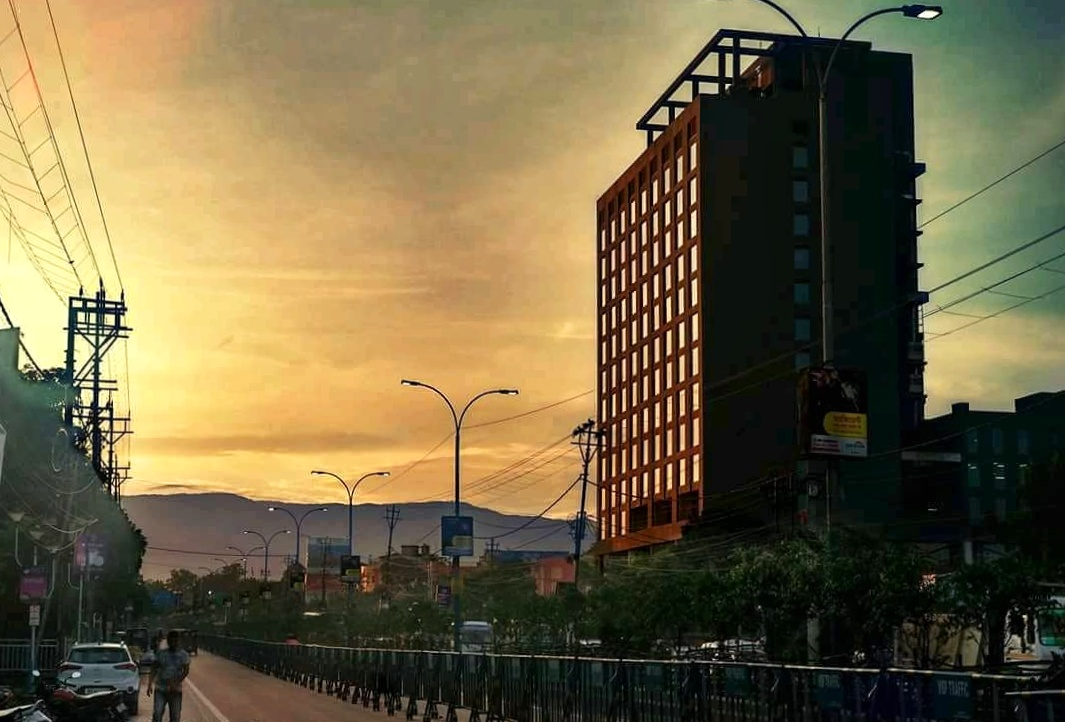
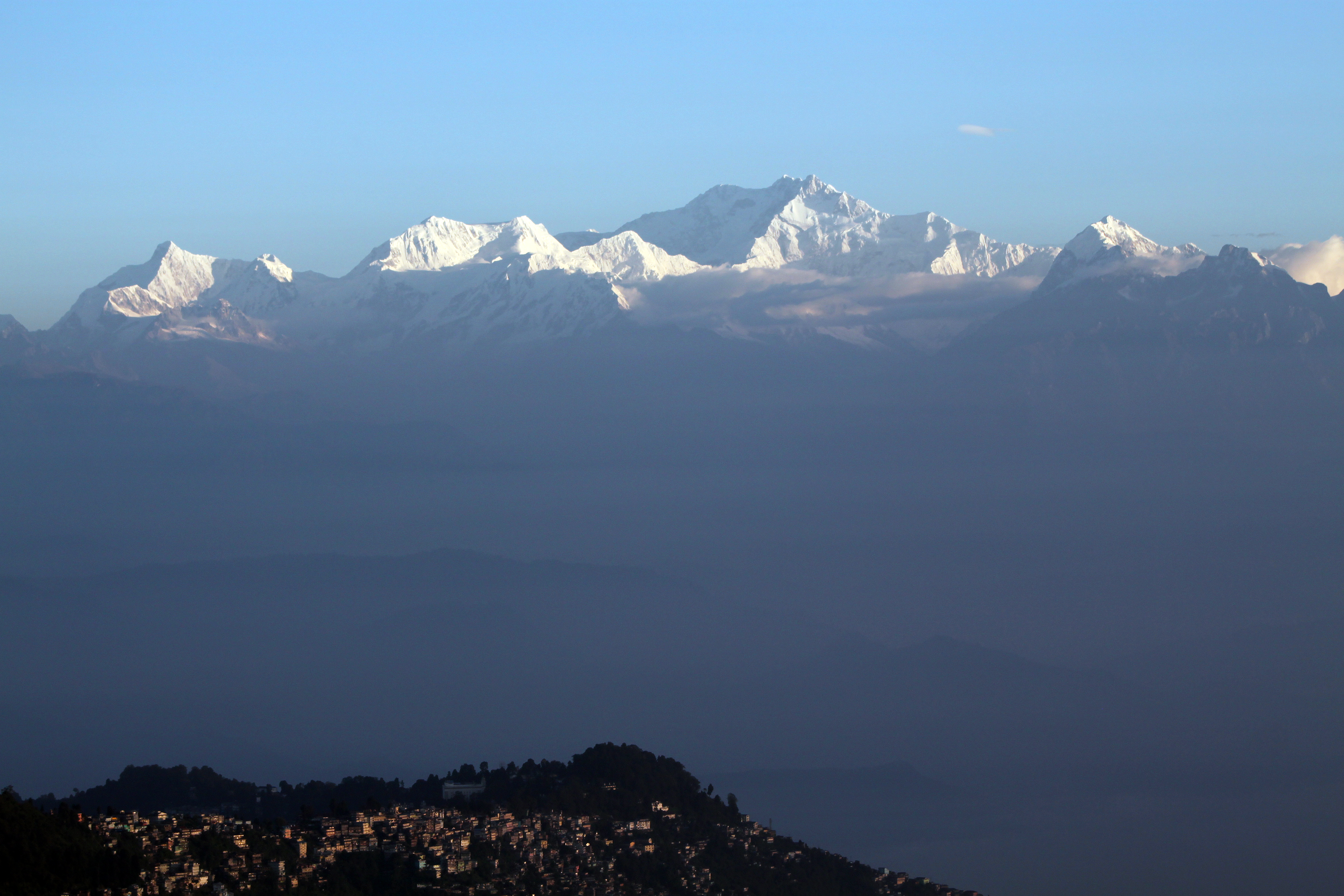
- Clockwise from top-left: Tea estate in Darjeeling, Darjeeling Himalayan Railway, View of Kangchenjunga from Tiger Hill, View of Siliguri

- Location of Darjeeling district in West Bengal
- Coordinates: 26°52′N 88°18′E
- Country: India
- State: West Bengal
- Division: Jalpaiguri
- Headquarters: Darjeeling

Government
  - Subdivisions: Darjeeling Sadar, Mirik, Siliguri, Kurseong
  - CD Blocks: Darjeeling Pulbazar, Jorebunglow Sukhiapokhri, Rangli Rangliot, Mirik, Naxalbari, Kharibari, Phansidewa, Matigara, Kurseong
  - Lok Sabha constituencies: Darjeeling
  - Vidhan Sabha constituencies: Darjeeling, Kurseong, Matigara-Naxalbari, Siliguri, Phansidewa

Area
  - Total: 3,149 km^{2} (1,216 sq mi)

Population (2011)
  - Total: 1,595,181
  - Density: 506.6/km^{2} (1,312/sq mi)
  - Urban: 727,963

Demographics
  - Literacy: 79.56 per cent
  - Sex ratio: 970 ♂/♀

Languages
  - Official: Bengali, Nepali
  - Additional official: English
- Time zone: UTC+05:30 (IST)
- Website: darjeeling.gov.in

Darjeeling district is the northernmost district of the state of West Bengal in eastern India in the foothills of the Himalayas, in the eastern Sivalik Hills.The district is famous for its hill station and Darjeeling tea. Darjeeling is the district headquarters. Kurseong, Siliguri and Mirik, three major towns in the district, are the subdivisional headquarters of the district. Kalimpong was one of the subdivisions but on 14 February 2017, it officially became a separate Kalimpong district.

Geographically, the district can be divided into two broad divisions: the hills and the plains. The entire hilly region of the district comes under the Gorkhaland Territorial Administration, a semi-autonomous administrative body under the state government of West Bengal. This body covers the three hill subdivisions of Darjeeling, Kurseong and Mirik and the district of Kalimpong. The foothills of Darjeeling Himalayas, which comes under the Siliguri subdivision, is known as the Terai. The district is bounded on the north by Sikkim, on the south by Uttar Dinajpur district of West Bengal, southwest by Kishanganj district of Bihar state, on the southeast by Panchagarh district of Bangladesh, on the east by Kalimpong and Jalpaiguri districts, and on the west by easternmost Koshi Province of Nepal. Darjeeling district has a length from north to south of 18 miles (29 km) and a breadth from east to west of 16 miles (26 km). As of 2011, it was the second least populous district of West Bengal (out of 19), after Dakshin Dinajpur.

== Name ==
The name Darjeeling is derived from "Tajenglung", a Limbu language term that means "the stones that talk to each other", according to the historian Sankarhang Subba of Darjeeling. Alternatively, it is derived from the Tibetan words Dorje, which is the thunderbolt sceptre and ling, which means "a place" or "land".

== History ==
The ancient inhabitants of Darjeeling are the Lepcha and Limbu.

Most of Darjeeling formed a part of dominions of the Chogyal of Sikkim, who had been engaged in an unsuccessful warfare against the Gorkhas of Nepal. From 1780, the Gorkhas made several attempts to capture the entire region of Darjeeling. By the beginning of the 19th century, they had overrun Sikkim as far eastward as the Teesta River and had conquered and annexed the entire Terai.

In the meantime, the British were engaged in preventing the Gorkhas from over-running the whole of the northern frontier. The Anglo-Gorkha war broke out in 1814, which resulted in the defeat of the Gorkhas and subsequently led to the signing of the Sugauli Treaty in 1815. According to the treaty, Nepal had to cede all those territories which the Gorkhas had annexed from the Chogyal of Sikkim to the British East India Company (i.e., the area between Mechi River and Teesta River). In 1817, through the Treaty of Titalia, the British East India Company reinstated the Chogyal of Sikkim, restored all the tracts of land between the Mechi and the Teesta rivers to the Chogyal of Sikkim and guaranteed his sovereignty. In 1835, the hill of Darjeeling, including an enclave of 138 square miles (360 km^{2}), was given to the British East India Company by Sikkim.

In November 1864, the Treaty of Sinchula was executed in which the Bhutan Dooars with the passes leading into the hills and Kalimpong were ceded to the British by Bhutan. The Darjeeling district can be said to have assumed its present shape and size in 1866 with an area of 1234 sq. miles.

Before 1861 and from 1870 to 1874, Darjeeling District was a "Non-Regulated Area" (where acts and regulations of the British Raj did not automatically apply in the district in line with rest of the country, unless specifically extended). From 1862 to 1870, it was considered a "Regulated Area". The phrase "Non-Regulated Area" was changed to "Scheduled District" in 1874 and again to "Backward Tracts" in 1919. The status was known as "Partially Excluded Area" from 1935 until the independence of India.

On 14 February 2017, Kalimpong district was carved out of Darjeeling district.

=== Gorkhaland Movement ===
The GNLF flag.

During the 1980s, the Gorkha National Liberation Front led an intensive and often violent campaign for the creation of a separate Gorkhaland state within India, across the Nepali-speaking areas in northern West Bengal. The movement reached its peak around 1986–1988 but ended with the establishment of the Darjeeling Gorkha Hill Council in 1988.

The hill areas of Darjeeling enjoyed some measure of autonomy under the Darjeeling Gorkha Hill Council. However, the demand for full statehood within India has emerged once again, with the Gorkha Janmukti Morcha as its chief proponent. The Gorkhaland Territorial Administration replaced the DGHC in August 2012 after the GJM signed an agreement with the government.

== Geography ==
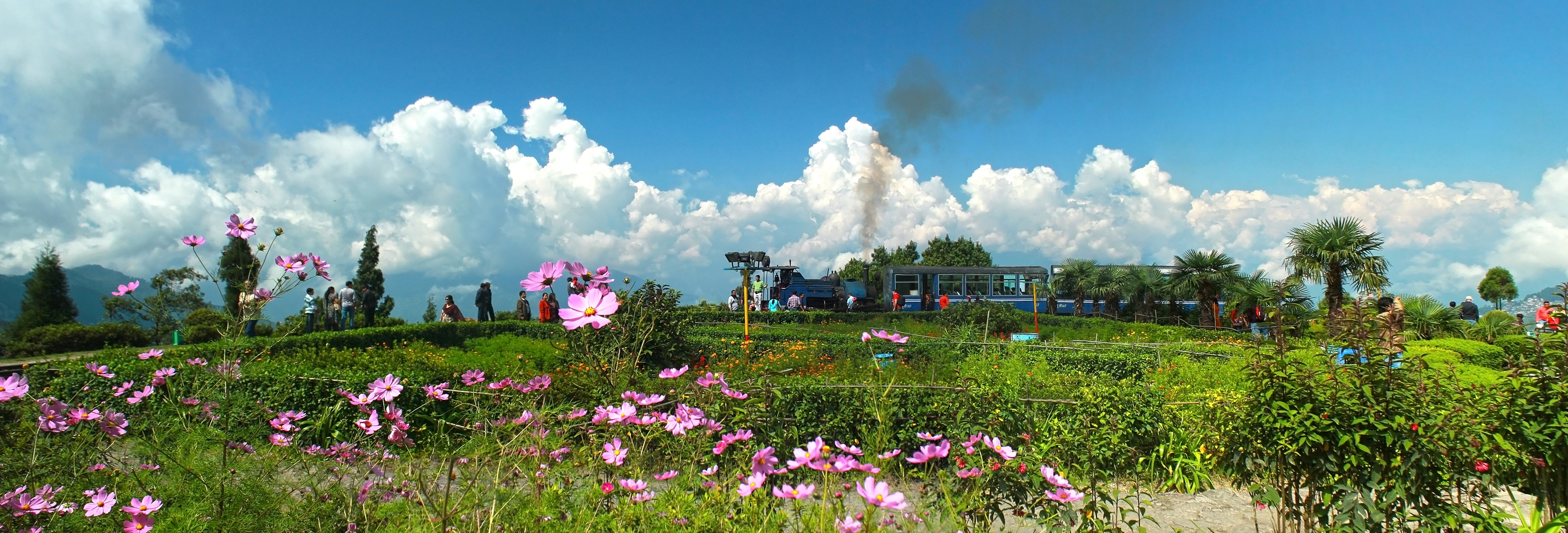
Batasia Loop, Darjeeling

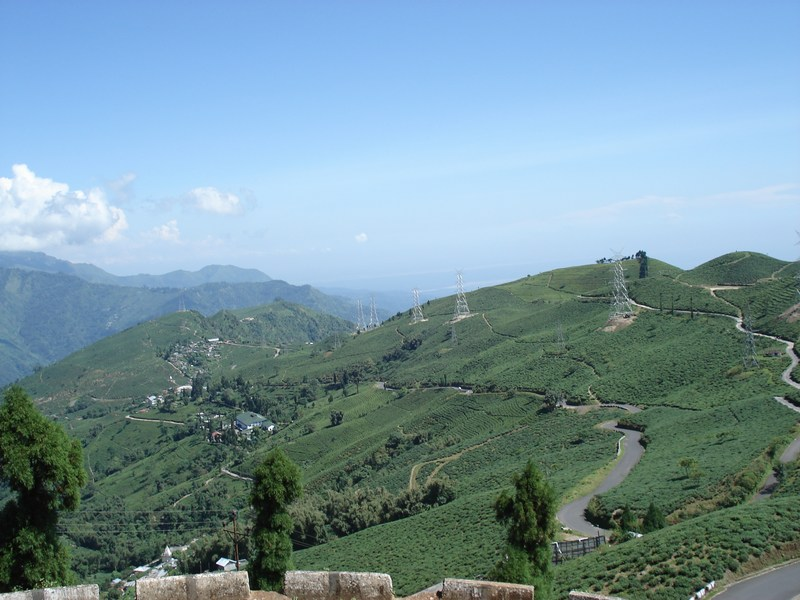
A tea garden in Darjeeling.

The Darjeeling hill area is formed of comparatively recent rock structure that has a direct bearing on landslides. Heavy monsoon precipitation contributes to the landslides. Soils of Darjeeling hill areas are extremely varied, depending on elevation, degree of slope, vegetative cover and geolithology.

The Himalayas serve as the source of natural resources for the population residing in the hills as well as in the plains. As human population expands in the hills, forests are being depleted for the extension of agricultural lands, introduction of new settlements, roadways, etc. The growing changes coming in the wake of urbanisation and industrialisation leave deep impressions on the hill ecosystem.

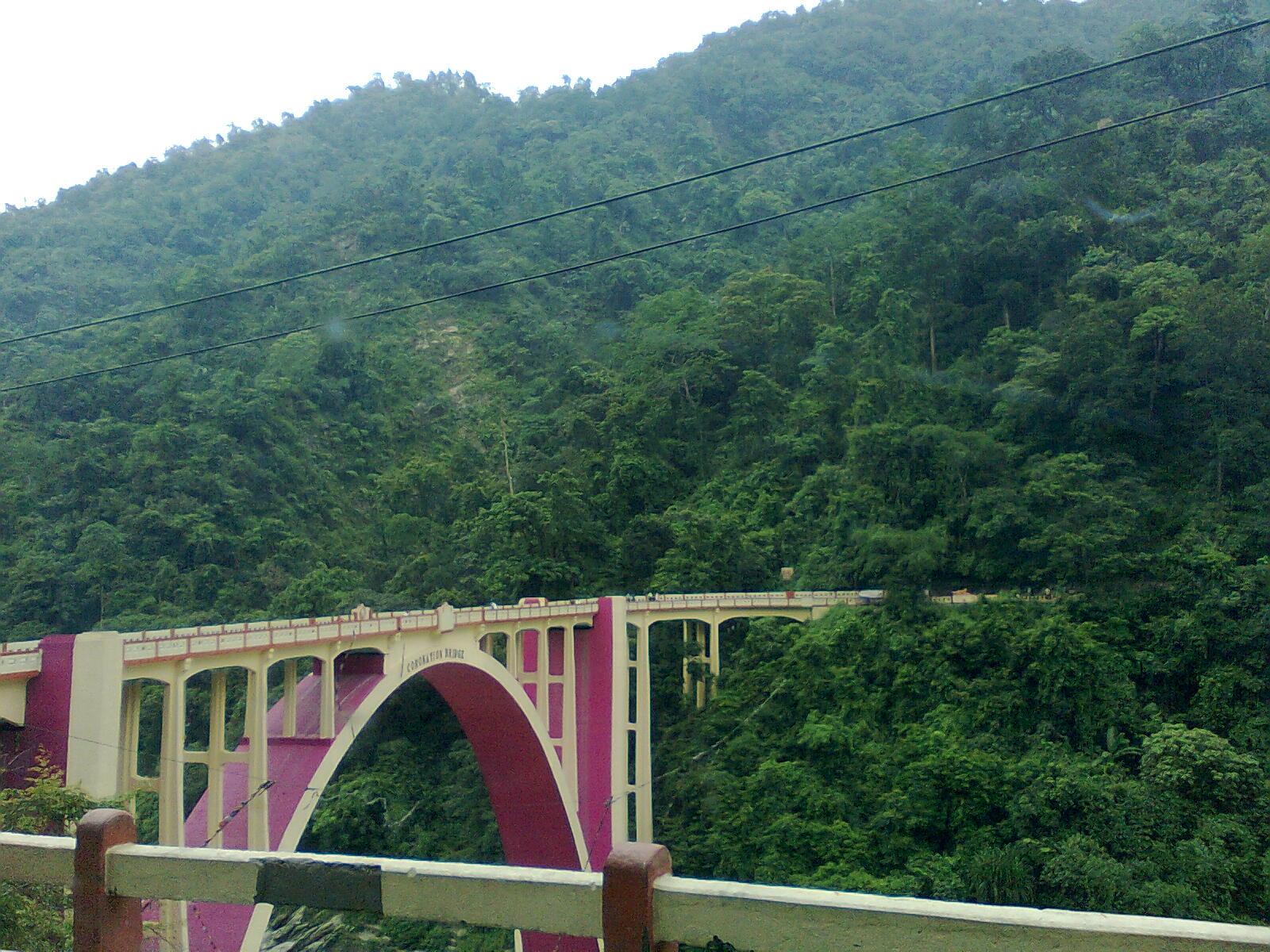
Coronation Bridge over Teesta River.

The economy of Darjeeling hill area depends on tea production, horticulture, agriculture, forestry and tourism. The major portions of the forests are today found at elevations of 2,000 metres (6,600 ft) and above. The area in between 1,000 and 2,000 metres (3,300 and 6,600 ft) is cleared either for tea plantation or cultivation. About 30 per cent of the forest covers found in the lower hills are deciduous. Evergreen forest constitutes only about 6 per cent of the total forest coverage. Shorea robusta remains the most prominent species of tropical moist deciduous forest along with heavy undergrowth.

Teesta, Rangeet, Mechi, Balason, Mahananda and Rammam are the important rivers of the district.

=== Climate ===
Climate data for Darjeeling
Month	Jan	Feb	Mar	Apr	May	Jun	Jul	Aug	Sep	Oct	Nov	Dec	Year
Record high °C (°F)	16 (61)	17 (63)	23 (73)	24 (75)	25 (77)	24 (75)	25 (77)	25 (77)	25 (77)	23 (73)	19 (66)	17 (63)	25 (77)
Mean daily maximum °C (°F)	8 (46)	9 (48)	14 (57)	17 (63)	18 (64)	18 (64)	19 (66)	18 (64)	18 (64)	16 (61)	12 (54)	9 (48)	15 (58)
Mean daily minimum °C (°F)	2 (36)	2 (36)	6 (43)	9 (48)	12 (54)	13 (55)	14 (57)	14 (57)	13 (55)	10 (50)	6 (43)	3 (37)	9 (48)
Record low °C (°F)	−3 (27)	−2 (28)	−1 (30)	1 (34)	6 (43)	8 (46)	9 (48)	11 (52)	10 (50)	4 (39)	2 (36)	−1 (30)	−3 (27)
Average precipitation mm (inches)	13 (0.5)	28 (1.1)	43 (1.7)	104 (4.1)	216 (8.5)	589 (23.2)	798 (31.4)	638 (25.1)	447 (17.6)	130 (5.1)	23 (0.9)	8 (0.3)	3,037 (119.6)
Source: http://www.bbc.co.uk/weather/world/city_guides/results.shtml?tt=TT004930

== Area ==
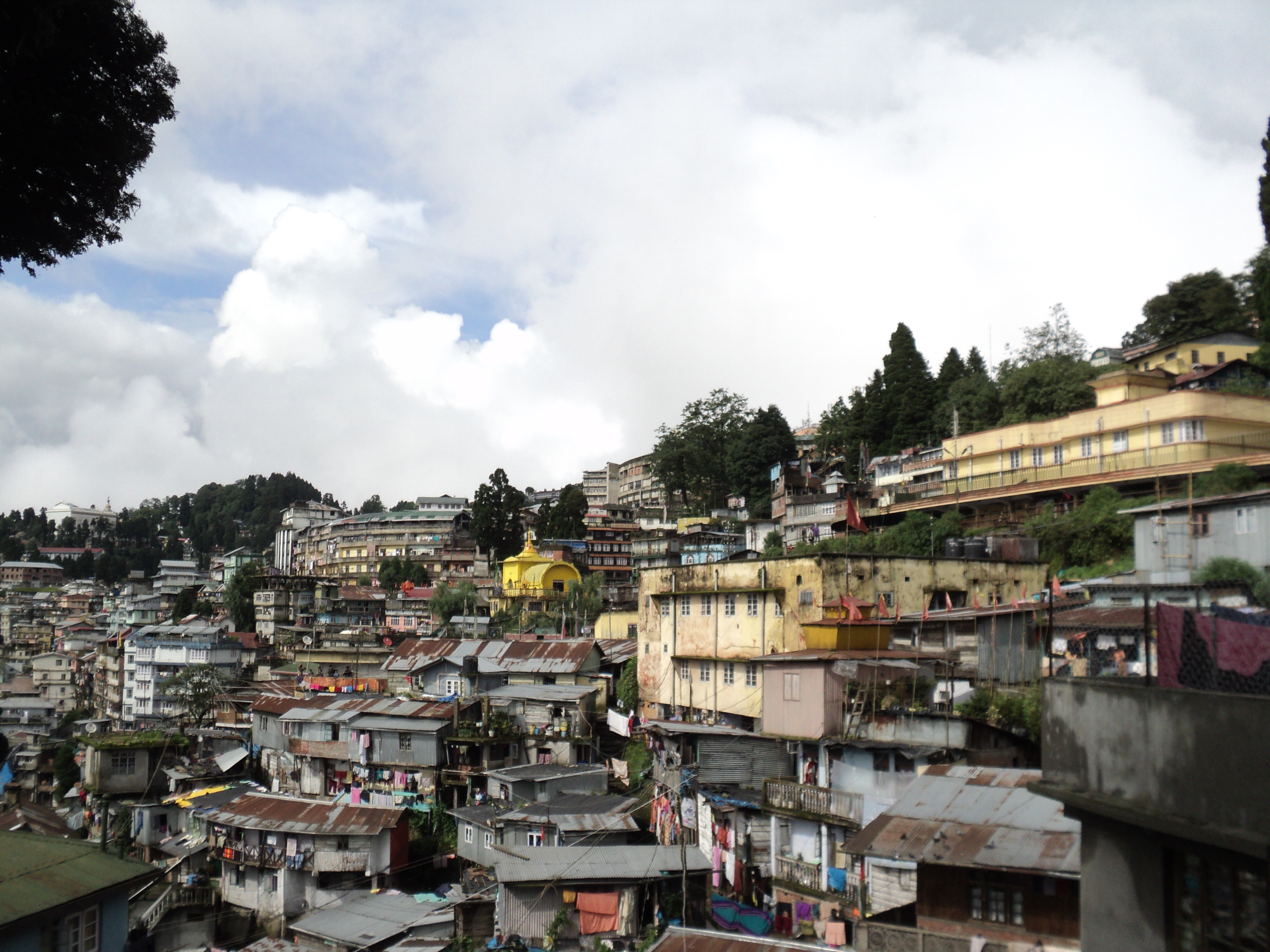
Darjeeling Municipal Area

=== Subdivisions ===
Darjeeling District comprises four subdivisions:

- Darjeeling Sadar subdivision
- Kurseong subdivision
- Mirik subdivision
- Siliguri subdivision

=== Assembly constituencies ===
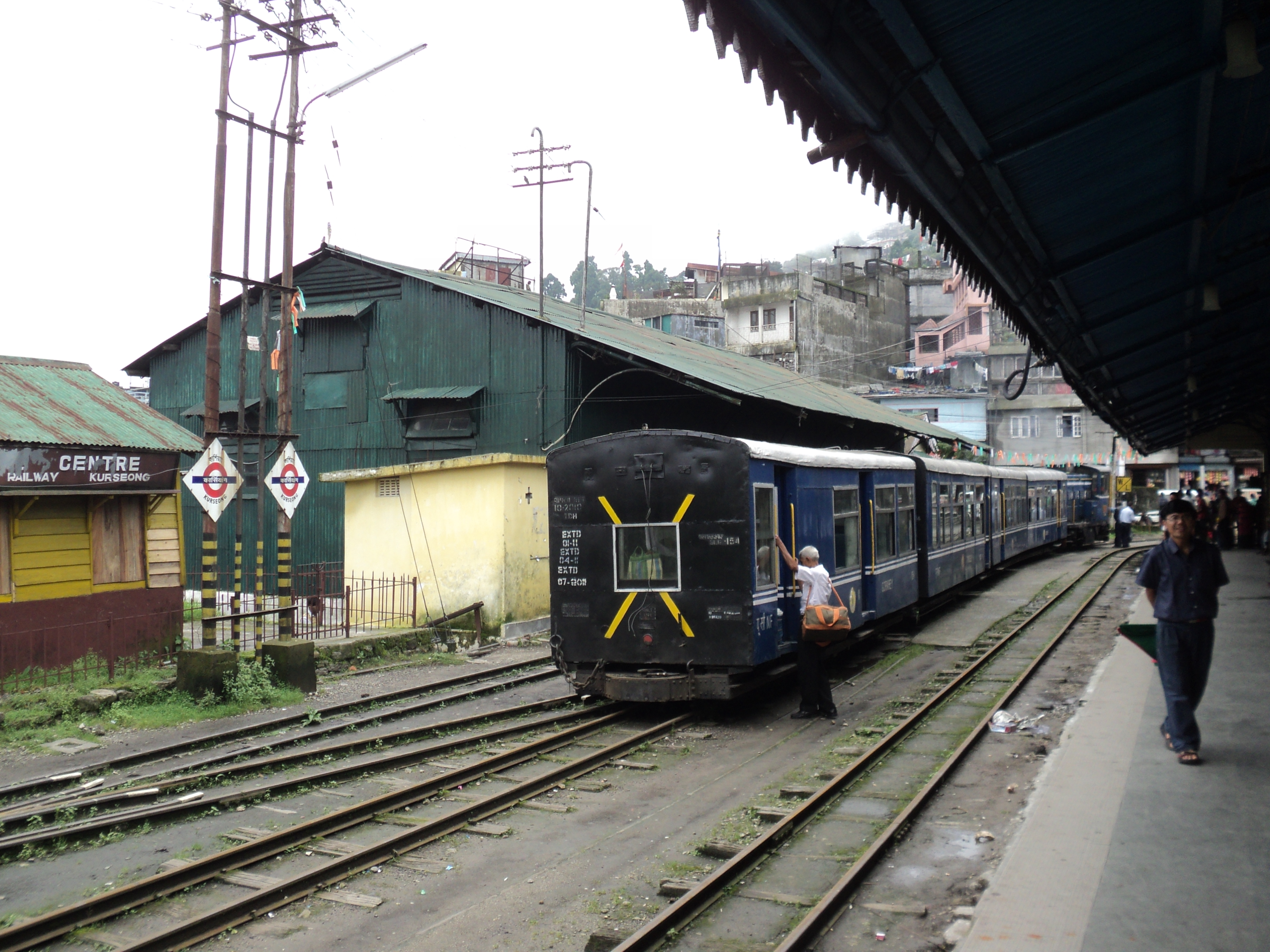
Kurseong Station, Darjeeling Himalayan Railway

The district was previously divided into six assembly constituencies. As per the order of the Delimitation Commission in respect of the delimitation of constituencies in West Bengal, the district had been divided into six assembly constituencies. Kalimpong has become a separate district from 14 February 2017, so the number of assembly constituencies in Darjeeling district is now five.

No.	Name	Lok Sabha	MLA	2021 Winner	2024 Lead
23	Darjeeling	Darjeeling	Neeraj Zimba	Bharatiya Janata Party	Bharatiya Janata Party
24	Kurseong	Darjeeling	Bishnu Prasad Sharma	Bharatiya Janata Party	Bharatiya Janata Party
25	Matigara-Naxalbari (SC)	Darjeeling	Anandamoy Barman	Bharatiya Janata Party	Bharatiya Janata Party
26	Siliguri	Darjeeling	Shankar Ghosh	Bharatiya Janata Party	Bharatiya Janata Party
27	Phansidewa (ST)	Darjeeling	Durga Murmu	Bharatiya Janata Party	Bharatiya Janata Party

Phansidewa constituency is reserved for Scheduled Tribes (ST) candidates. Matigara-Naxalbari constituency is reserved for Scheduled Castes (SC) candidates. Along with one assembly constituency from Kalimpong district and one assembly constituency from Uttar Dinajpur district, the five assembly constituencies of this district form the Darjeeling Lok Sabha constituency.

== Demographics ==
Historical population
Year	Pop.	±% p.a.
1901	265,780	—
1911	279,899	+0.52%
1921	294,237	+0.50%
1931	332,061	+1.22%
1941	390,899	+1.64%
1951	459,617	+1.63%
1961	624,640	+3.12%
1971	781,777	+2.27%
1981	1,024,269	+2.74%
1991	1,299,919	+2.41%
2001	1,609,172	+2.16%
2011	1,846,823	+1.39%

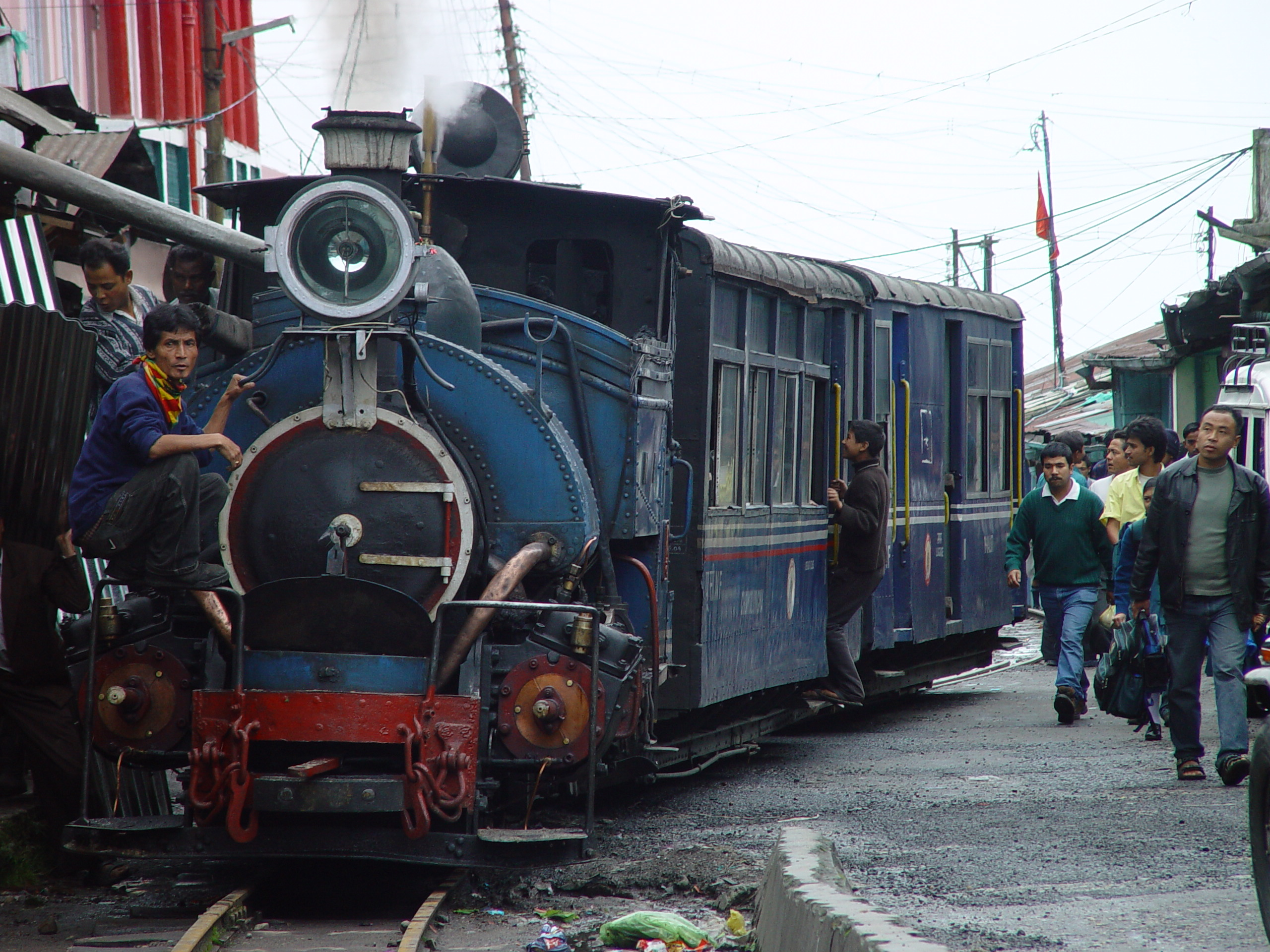
Darjeeling Toy Train

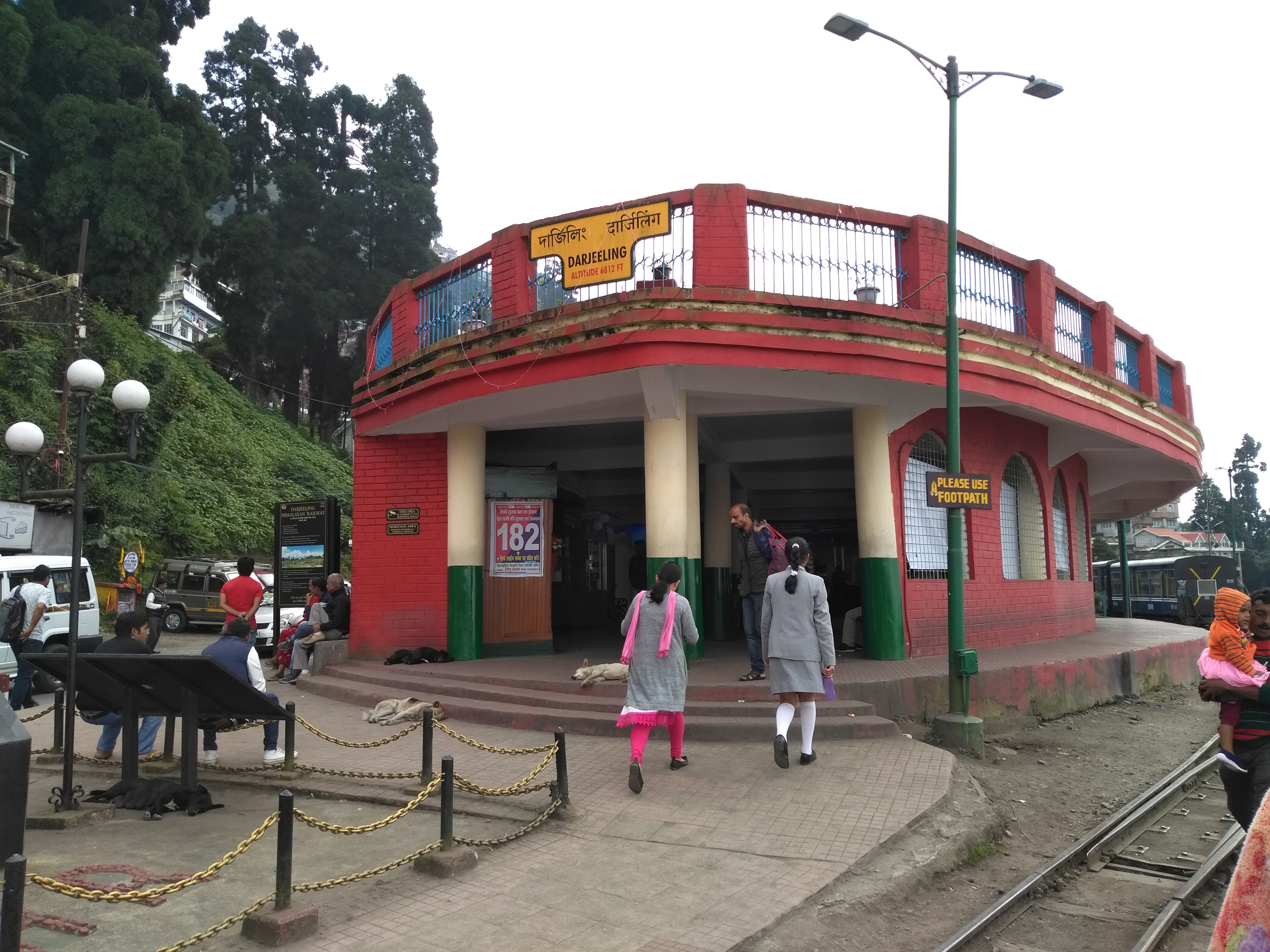
Darjeeling railway station an outside view

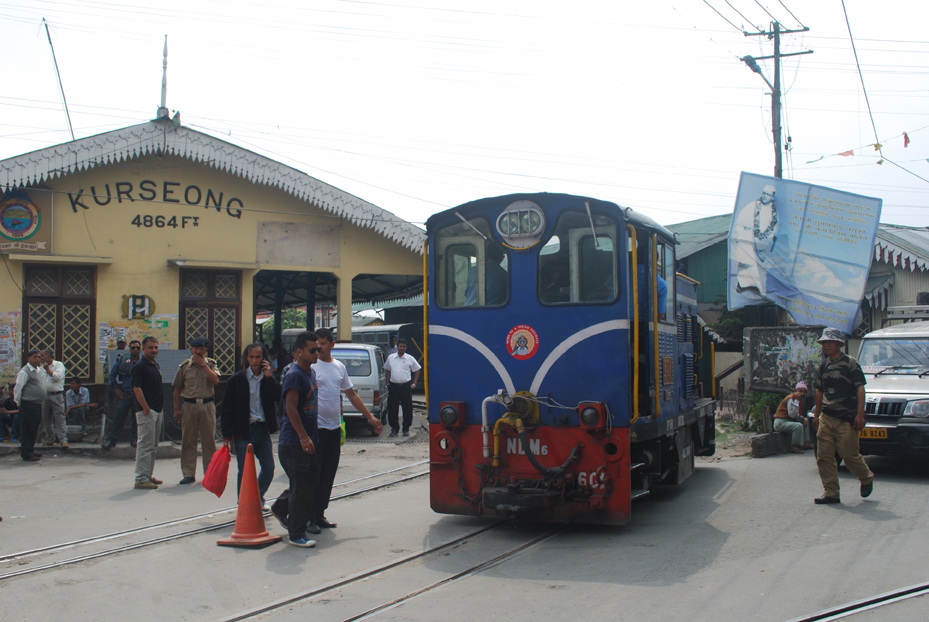
Darjeeling Himalayan Railway toy train at Kurseong station

According to the 2011 census Darjeeling district has a population of 1,846,823, roughly equal to the population of Kosovo. This gives it a ranking of 257th in India (out of a total of 640). The district has a population density of 586 inhabitants per square kilometre (1,520/sq mi). Its population growth rate over the decade 2001-2011 was 14.77%. Darjeeling has a sex ratio of 970 females for every 1000 males, and a literacy rate of 79.56%. After Kalimpong district was separated its population was 1,595,181, of which 671,1771 (42.11%) live in urban areas. The residual district has a sex ratio of 972 females per 1000 males. Scheduled Castes and Scheduled Tribes make up 18.86% and 20.21% of the population respectively.

In 2001, the population of the district was 1,609,172. The rural population was 1,088,740 and urban population was 520,432. Total males were 830,644 and females were 778,528. The density of population was 511 per km^{2}. The decennial population growth rate (1991–2001) was 23.79%.

The hills have a population of 624,061 which is nearly 40% of the population. The original inhabitants of the Darjeeling Hills were the Lepcha and Limbu (the ravine people, as they prefer themselves to be known as). Other communities with a long history in the district include the Tamang, Yakkha, Rai, Gurung, Magar, Newar, Thami, Chettri, Bahun, Kami, and Damai. There is also a sizeable population of Tibetans who arrived from Tibet since the 1950s. Over time, the ethnic distinctions between the hill people have blurred and today most identify as Gorkha and declare Nepali only as mother tongue.

In the plains, the Bengalis are in majority while there are large numbers of Gorkhas and Adivasis, the latter of which migrated from Chotanagpur and Santhal Parganas during British rule as tea garden workers. Both in the hills and plains are various migrants from other regions including Biharis, Marwaris and Punjabis.

=== Religion ===
Religion in Darjeeling district (2011)
Hinduism	76.06%
Buddhism	9.81%
Christianity	6.54%
Islam	6.34%
Others*	0.78%
Other or not stated	0.47%
Others includes faiths like Kirat Mundhum, Bon, Mun

Religion in present-day Darjeeling district
Religion	Population (1941)	Percentage (1941)	Population (2011)	Percentage (2011)
Hinduism	142,568	47.95%	1,213,326	76.06%
Tribal religion	109,627	36.87%	12,460	0.78%
Islam	8,801	2.96%	101,088	6.34%
Christianity	1,885	0.63%	104,395	6.54%
Buddhism	---	---	156,552	9.81%
Others (Note: Including Jainism, Buddhism, Zoroastrianism, Judaism, Ad-Dharmis, or not stated)	34,446	11.59%	7,360	0.47%
Total Population	297,327	100%	1,595,181	100%

Hinduism is the majority religion in both the hills and plains. Buddhism and Kirat Mudhum are almost entirely present in the hills. Christianity is primarily in the hills, although there are significant numbers among the tea tribes in the plains. Islam is almost entirely found in the plains.

=== Languages ===
Languages spoken in Darjeeling district (2011)
1. Nepali (39.9%)
2. Bengali (26.5%)
3. Hindi (10.9%)
4. Rajbongshi (6.17%)
5. Sadri (5.38%)
6. Kurukh (2.52%)
7. Bhojpuri (1.50%)
8. Santali (1.15%)
9. 'Other' Bengali (1.04%)
10. Others (4.90%)

At the time of the 2011 census, 39.88% of the population spoke Nepali, 26.51% Bengali, 10.95% Hindi, 6.17% Rajbongshi, 5.38% Sadri, 2.52% Kurukh, 1.50% Bhojpuri and 1.15% Santali as their first language. 1.04% of the population recorded their language as 'Others' under Bengali. According to 1951 Census, about 25.2% of the population in the three hill sub-divisions of Darjeeling district (including Kalimpong) and only 19.98% of undivided Darjeeling spoke Nepali as mother language. Other languages formerly spoken in the hills included Limbu, Tamang, Magar, Gurung, Rai, Sunuwar, Yakkha and Newar. In 1961, all these Sino-Tibetian languages-speaking tribes declared Nepali as their mother tongue instead of their actual mother tongue, as a result of which the Nepali population of undivided Darjeeling district rose from 19.98% to 60%. So, the actual number of native Nepali-speaking people in this district is still unclear.

Bengali is the official language of the district, with Nepali declared as co-official only in Darjeeling and Kurseong subdivisions.

Nepali is the dominant language in the hill divisions, spoken by more than 90% of the people in Darjeeling, Kurseong and Mirik subdivisions, although most hill inhabitants are not from Khas communities. Several hundred of the original hill inhabitants still speak their original languages although the vast majority now speak only Nepali.

The main language of the Siliguri subdivision is Bengali. It is followed by a sizeable number of Hindi and Rajbanshi speakers. Among the Adivasis, Sadri is the main language although some still speak their original languages like Kurukh, Mundari and Santali.

== Flora and fauna ==
Darjeeling district is home to Singalila National Park, which was set up in 1986 as a wildlife sanctuary and converted to a national park in 1992. It has an area of 78.60 km^{2} (30.3 mi^{2}).

Darjeeling district has three wildlife sanctuaries: Jorepokhri, Mahananda, and Senchal.

== Geographical indication ==
Kalonunia rice was awarded the Geographical Indication (GI) status tag from the Geographical Indications Registry under the Union Government of India on 2 January 2024 (valid until 11 March 2034). It is a common and widely cultivated crop in districts of Cooch Behar, Jalpaiguri and Alipurduar along with some parts of Darjeeling and Kalimpong districts of West Bengal.

State Agricultural Management & Extension Training Institute (SAMETI) from Narendrapur, proposed the GI registration of Kalonunia rice. After filing the application in March 2021, the rice was granted the GI tag in 2024 by the Geographical Indication Registry in Chennai, making the name "Kalonunia rice" exclusive to the rice grown in the region. It thus became the third rice variety from West Bengal after Tulaipanji rice and the 26th type of goods from West Bengal to earn the GI tag.

The GI tag protects the rice from illegal selling and marketing, and gives it legal protection and a unique identity.

== Notable people ==
- Sudhin Dasgupta (1929-1982), music composer, lyricist and singer
- Sravanti Mazumdar, playback singer, songwriter, radio broadcaster and TV host.
- Taslimuddin Ahmad (1852-1927), lawyer, author and philanthropist
- Sonia Jabbar, wildlife conservationist
