= Gorkhaland Territorial Administration =

Autonomous administrative division in West Bengal, India

- Autonomous Administrative Region
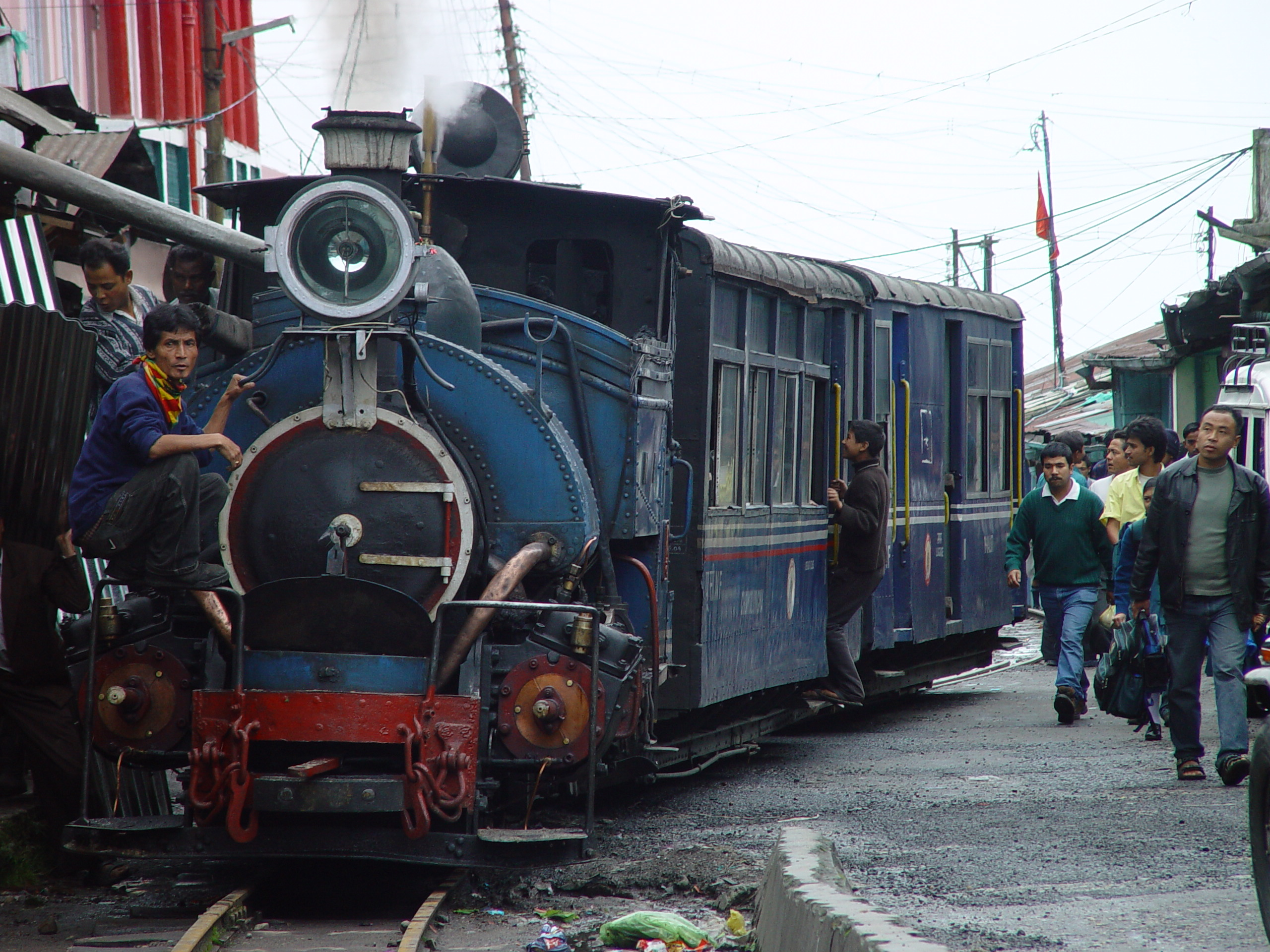
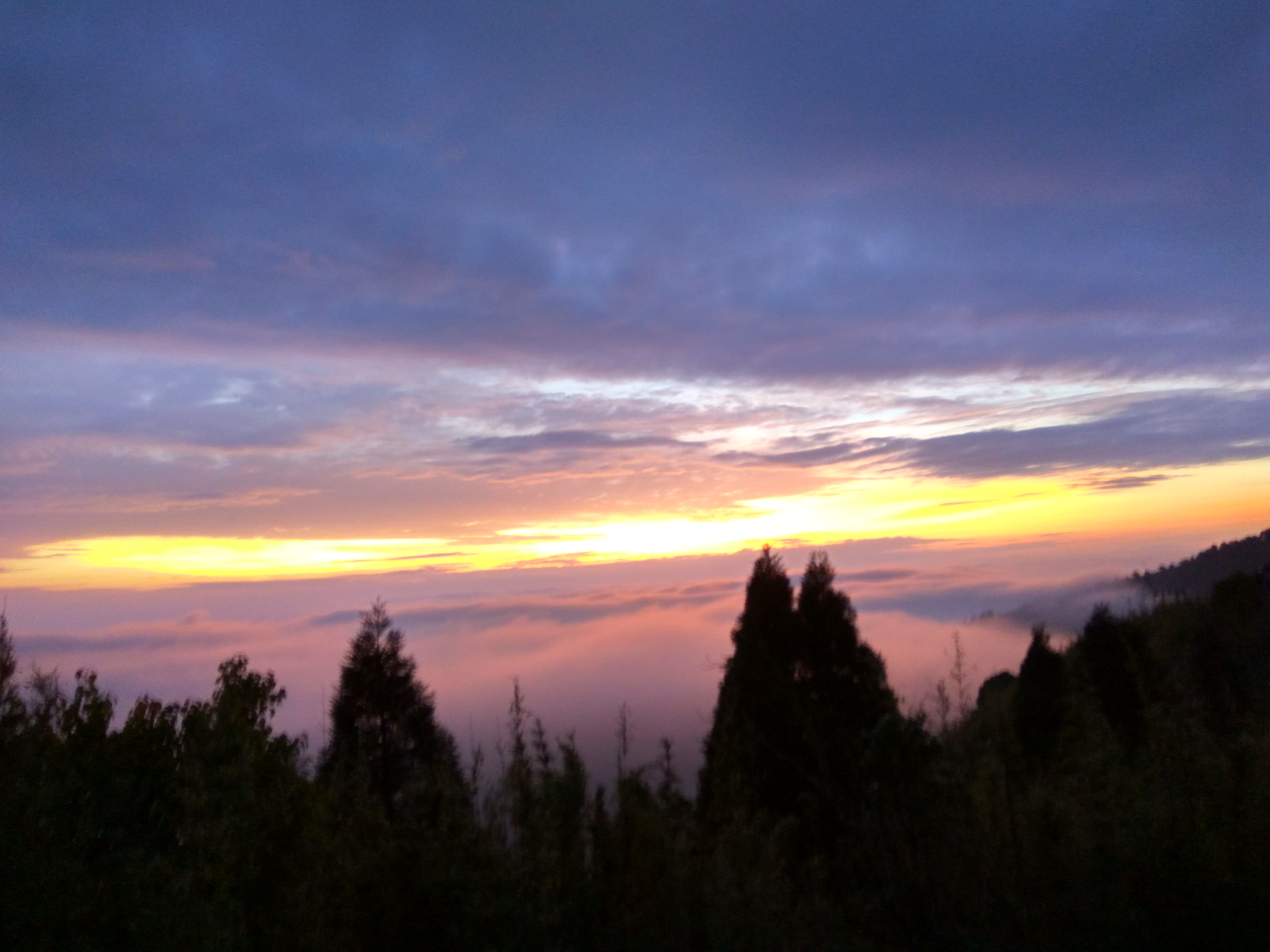
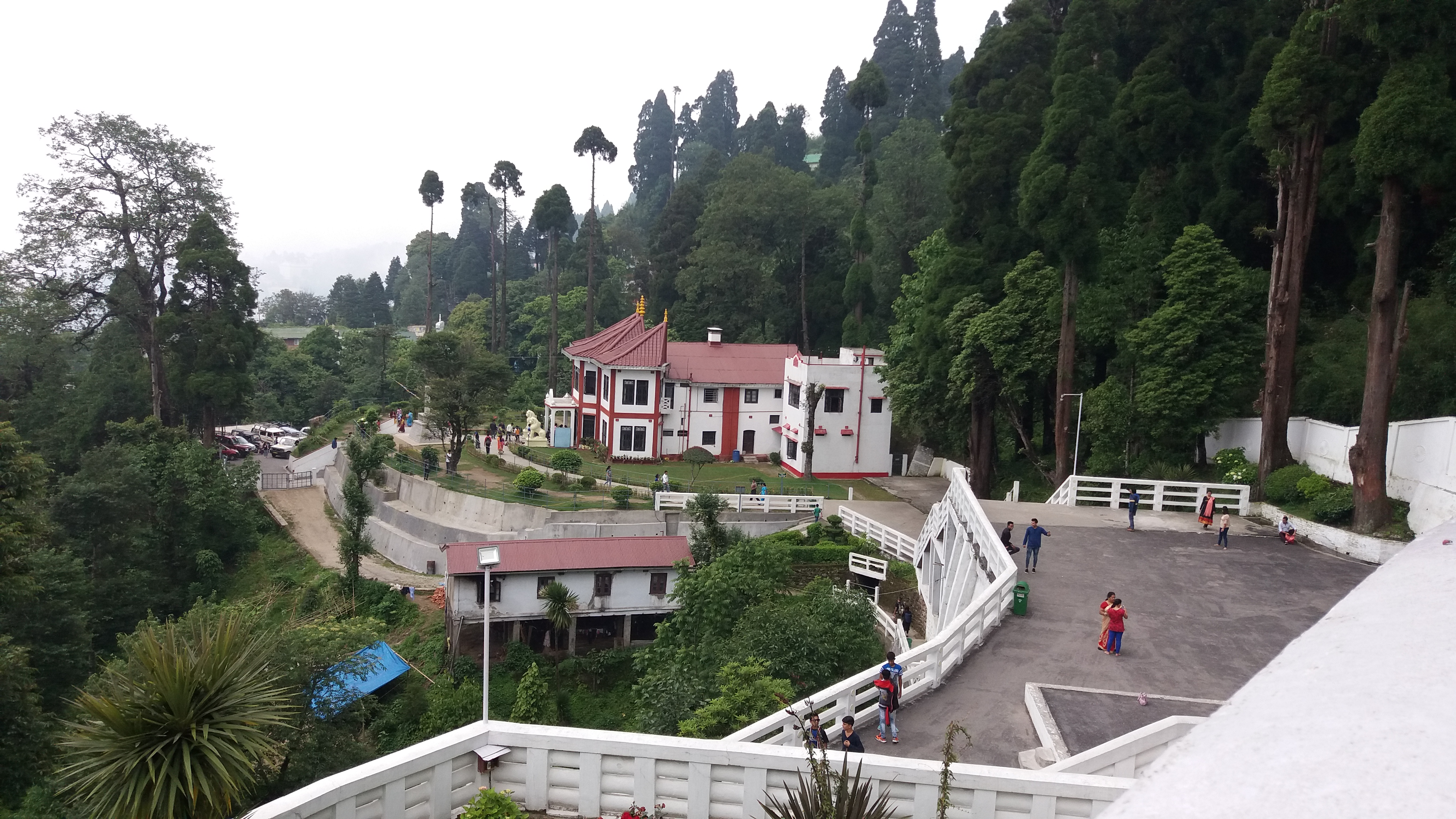
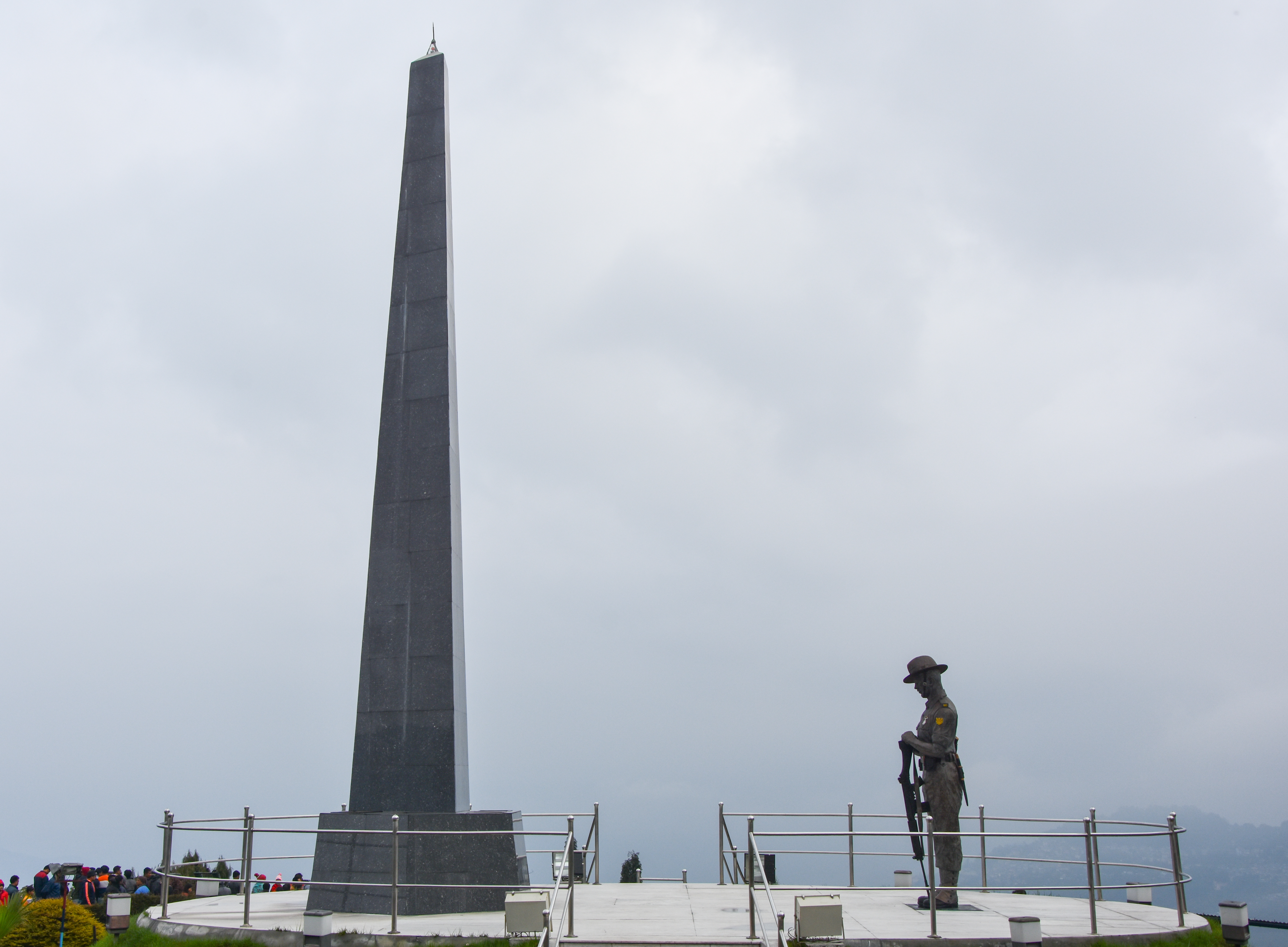
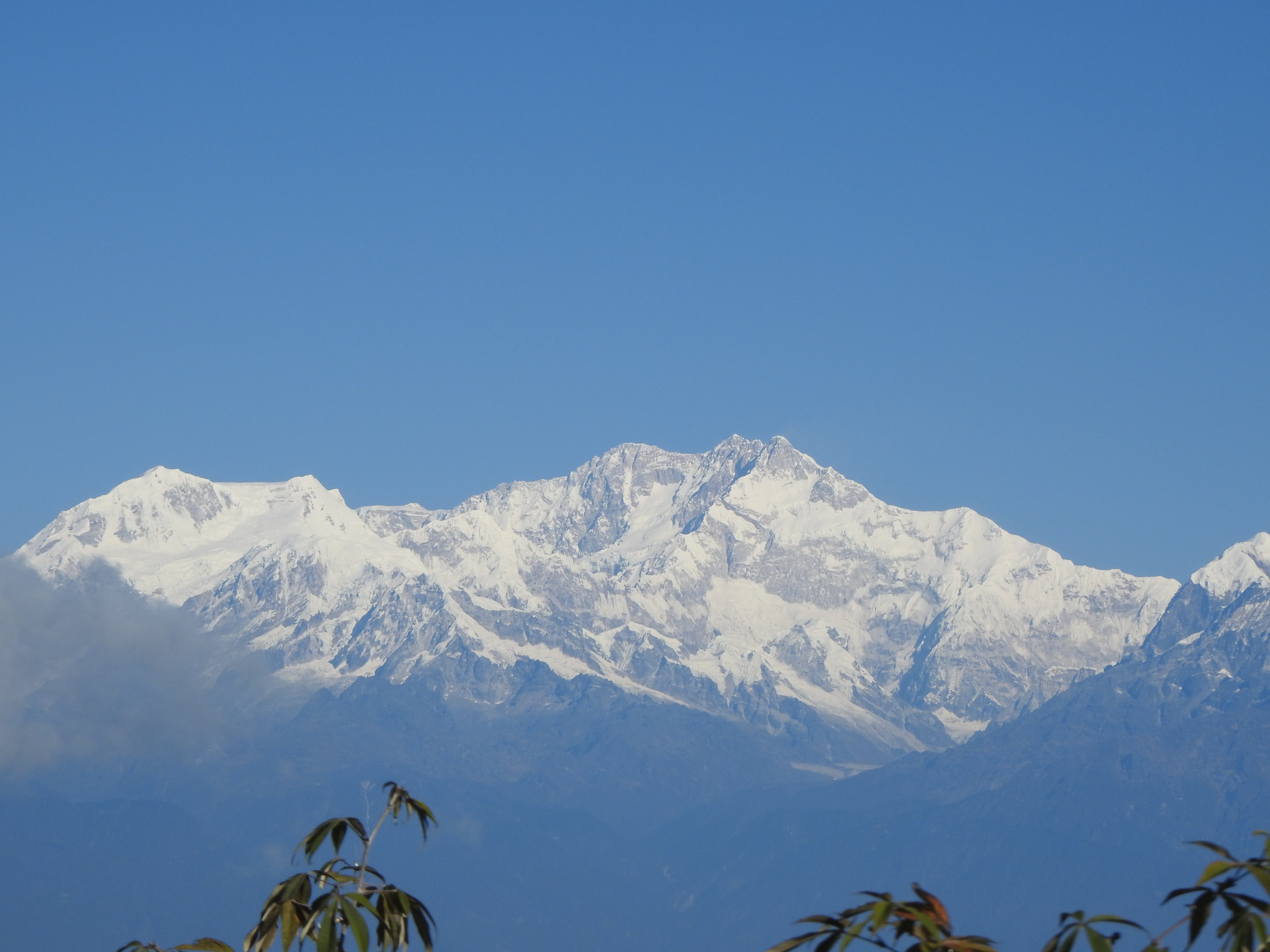
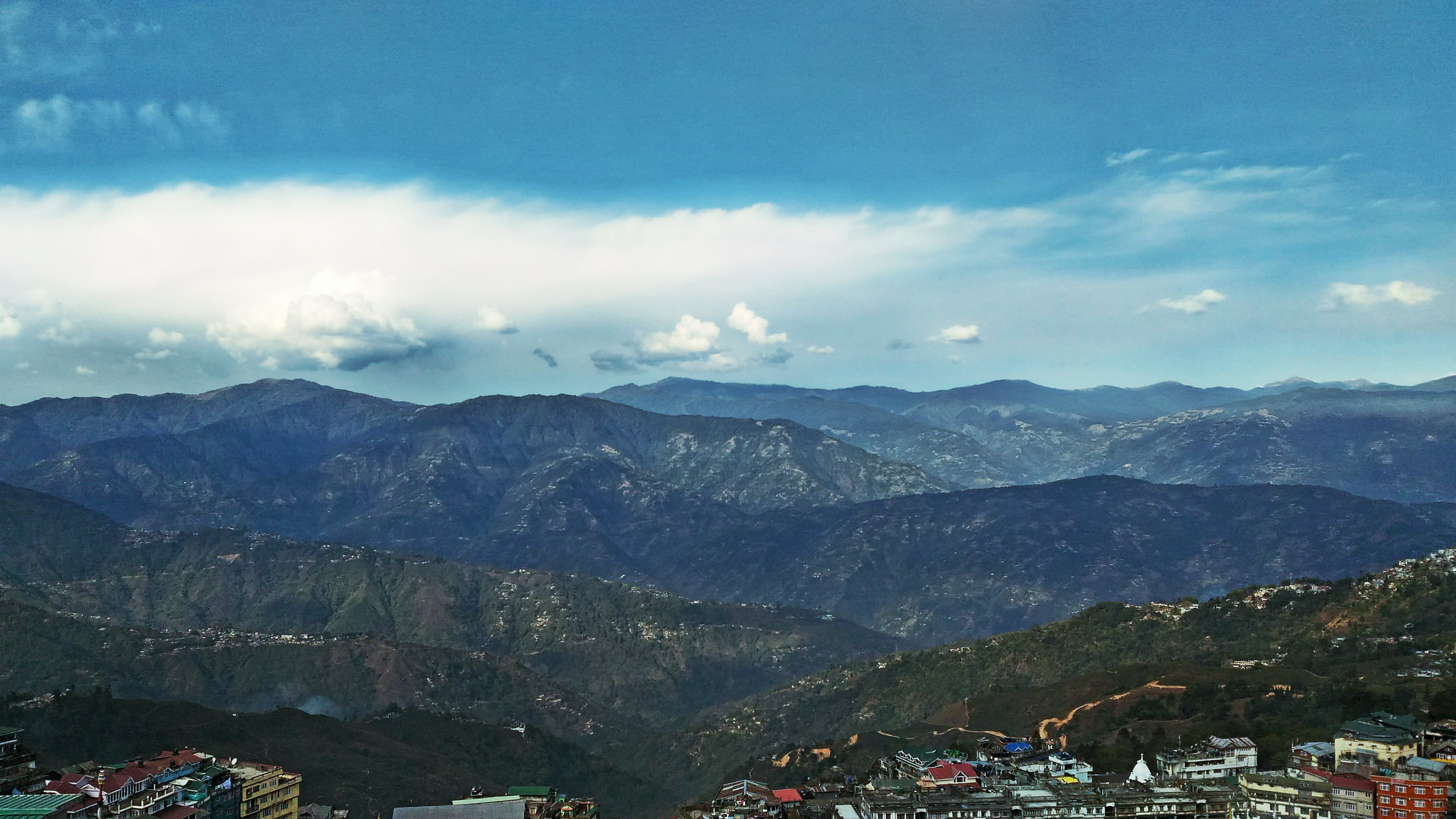
- Clockwise from top: Darjeeling Himalayan Railway; Sunrise view from Tiger Hill; Peace Pagoda, Darjeeling; Batasia Loop; View of the Himalayas from Darjeeling; Darjeeling cityscape

- Seal
- Nickname: "Land of the Gorkhas"
- Coordinates: 27°02′N 88°16′E
- Country: India
- State: West Bengal
- Established: 2011
- Headquarters: Darjeeling

Area
  - Total: 2,250 km^{2} (870 sq mi)

Population (2021 est.)
  - Total: 1,850,000
  - Density: 822/km^{2} (2,130/sq mi)

Languages
  - Official: Nepali, English
  - Regional: Bengali, Bhutia, Hindi, Lepcha, Limbu, Rai, Sherpa,Tamang
- Time zone: UTC+05:30 (IST)
- PIN: 734xxx
- Telephone code: +91-354
- Vehicle registration: WB-76, WB-77, WB-78

Gorkhaland Territorial Administration
- Seal of the GTA

- Gorkhaland (marked red) in West Bengal

Type
- Type: Autonomous Administrative Division
- Term limits: 5 years

History
- Founded: 2012; 14 years ago
- Preceded by: Darjeeling Gorkha Hill Council

Leadership
- Administrator: Smrutiranjan Mohanty

Structure
- Seats: 50
- Political groups: Government (36) AITC+ (36): BGPM (29); AITC (4); IND (3); Official Opposition (6): IGJF (6); Other opposition (8) IND (3) Nominated (5)

Elections
- Voting system: First-past-the-post voting
- Last election: 2022
- Next election: 2027

Meeting place
- Darjeeling, West Bengal

Website
- gtadarjeeling.wb.gov.in

Footnotes
- Area: 3,303.98 km²; Population : 878,002; Density : 270/km²

The Gorkhaland Territorial Administration (GTA) is a semi-autonomous council consisting of the northernmost areas of the Indian state of West Bengal. The GTA was formed in 2012 to replace the Darjeeling Gorkha Hill Council, which had been formed in 1988 and administered the Darjeeling hills for 23 years.

GTA presently consists of three hill subdivisions Darjeeling, Kurseong, Mirik, some areas of Siliguri subdivision of Darjeeling district and the whole of Kalimpong district under its authority.

== History ==
Gorkhaland is the name of the proposed state in India that the Nepali-speaking Indian Gorkha ethnic group in the district of Darjeeling and Kalimpong and the Dooars in northern region of West Bengal have expressed a desire to create. A demand for a separate administrative unit in Darjeeling has existed since 1909, when the Hillmen's Association of Darjeeling submitted a memorandum to Minto-Morley Reforms demanding a separate administrative setup. The term Gorkhaland was coined by Subhash Ghisingh, leader of Gorkha National Liberation Front, who led a violent agitation for its formation in the 1980s. This movement culminated with the formation of Darjeeling Gorkha Hill Council (DGHC) in 1988. The DGHC did not fulfil its goal of forming a new state, which led to the downfall of Subhash Ghisingh and the rise of another party Gorkha Janmukti Morcha (GJM) headed by Bimal Gurung in 2007, which launched a second agitation for a Gorkhaland state.

=== Formation of GTA ===
After three years of agitation for a state of Gorkhaland led by GJM, the GJM reached an agreement with the state government to form a semi-autonomous body to administer the Darjeeling hills. A bill for the creation of GTA was passed in the West Bengal Legislative Assembly on 2 September 2011. The GTA aimed to have administrative, executive and financial powers but no legislative powers. A 10-member joint verification committee headed by a retired High Court judge examined the demand to bring the Gorkha-inhabited pockets of the Dooars and the Terai under the GTA.

=== Memorandum of Agreement ===
The Memorandum of Agreement for GTA was signed on 18 July 2011 at Pintail Village near Siliguri in the presence of Union Home Minister P. Chidambaram, West Bengal chief minister Mamata Banerjee, the then Darjeeling Lok Sabha MP Jaswant Singh and Gorkha Janmukti Morcha leaders. The agreement was signed by West Bengal Home Secretary G.D. Gautama, Union Home Ministry Joint Secretary K.K. Pathak and Gorkha Janmukti Morcha general secretary Roshan Giri.

=== Demand for GATA ===
On 29 October 2011, the Gorkha Janmukti Morcha and the Akhil Bharatiya Adivasi Vikas Parishad (ABAVP), Dooars Unit signed an 18-point agreement at Mongpoo, after which these organizations jointly proposed a new administrative body called the Gorkhaland and Adivasi Territorial Administration (GATA) in place of the GTA. The ABAVP decided to agree to incorporate 196 mouzas of the Dooars and 199 mouzas of the Terai region into the proposed GATA.

=== President's assent and high-power committee report ===
The President of India Pratibha Patil gave her assent to the GTA Bill of West Bengal on 7 March 2012. The West Bengal government issued a gazette notification for the GTA Act on 14 March 2012, signalling preparations for elections for the GTA. In a meeting held on 24 March 2012 between GJM leaders and the West Bengal government, it was decided that the election to the GTA would be held in the end of June or in July 2012. The Justice Sen Committee would be requested to submit its report on the inclusion of additional areas of Terai and Dooars in the GTA by early June 2012. The WB government released a list of 45 constituencies of the GTA on 26 May 2012 to which elections are to be held in July 2012. The high-powered committee headed by retired judge Shyamal Kumar Sen that was set up by the West Bengal government recommended inclusion of just five mouzas under the proposed GTA although the Gorkha Janmukti Morcha had demanded 398 mouzas from the Dooars and Terai regions. The West Bengal government announced that it would set up a three-member "Fact Verification Committee" to go into the recommendations of Justice Sen Committee after the Gorkha Janmukti Morcha rejected its report. The Calcutta High Court admitted on 19 June 2012 the case moved by Gorkha National Liberation Front leader Subhash Ghisingh challenging the legality of the GTA. Justice Dipankar Dutta told the three signatories to the GTA agreement – the central government, the state government and the Gorkha Janmukti Morcha – to file affidavits stating their stand on Ghisingh's contention.

== Elections and developments ==
=== GTA election 2012 ===
The West Bengal government announced that the election for the GTA would be held on 29 July 2012. The Gorkha Janmukti Morcha announced that it would contest the GTA polls, which it had earlier threatened to boycott over the Justice Sen-headed committee recommendations on territorial inclusion of the Dooars and Terai that it had rejected. After a period of silence, the Gorkha Janmukti Morcha announced the names of its GTA election nominees. Parties that formed the Gorkhaland Task Force (CPRM, ABGL, GNLF(C), Gorkhaland Rajya Nirman Morcha and others) decided not contest the GTA elections. Both CPI(M) and Trinamool Congress fielded candidates in the election. The GNLF decided to boycott the elections and its chairman filed a case in the Kolkata High Court challenging the GTA. The CPI(M) withdrew the nominations of all its 13 candidates from the GTA elections, alleging threats and intimidation by the GJM and the GJM received 28 seats of the GTA uncontested. In the elections of the remaining 17 seats of the GTA held on 29 July 2012, GJM candidates won from all the constituencies. Sanchabir Subba, the rebel Gorkha Janmukti Morcha candidate from Gitdabling-Nimbong, narrowly lost to the party's official contestant Kalyan Dewan by 677 votes. The newly elected members of the GTA were sworn in on 4 August 2012 at Darjeeling in the presence of home minister Sushilkumar Shinde and Chief Minister of West Bengal Mamata Banerjee.

Summary of results of the Gorkhaland Territorial Administration election, 2012
Political Party	Seats Contested	Seats Won	Net Change in Seats
GJM	45	45	First election
AITC	17	0	First election

=== 2017 agitation and GTA under appointed administrators ===
In 2017, there was another agitation for Gorkhaland in the Darjeeling hills. The GTA councillors belonging to GJM resigned and burnt copies of the GTA memorandum of agreement and the GTA Act in June 2017, saying that the GTA had failed to fulfil the aspirations of the people. On 20 September 2017, the West Bengal government reconstituted the GTA and appointed rebel GJM leader Binoy Tamang as its chairperson. Before the 2019 Darjeeling assembly bye-election, Binoy Tamang stepped down as GTA chairman to contest the assembly bye-election. Anit Thapa was appointed the new GTA chairman. Before the 2021 West Bengal Legislative Assembly election, the West Bengal government dissolved the Anit Thapa-led GTA Board of Administrators and handed over the administration of GTA to the GTA principal secretary.

=== GTA election 2022 ===
After running the GTA with government-appointed administrators for 5 years (2017–2022), the West Bengal government announced that the election for the second GTA Sabha would be held on 26 June 2022. A total of 277 candidates, including 45 from Hamro Party (now renamed Indian Gorkha Janshakti Front), 36 from Bharatiya Gorkha Prajatantrik Morcha, 12 from CPIM, 10 from Trinamool Congress, 5 from Congress and 169 independents, contested the GTA election. All elected members of the GTA Sabha took oath on 12 July 2022 in Darjeeling in a function that was attended by West Bengal Chief Minister Mamata Banerjee. On 14 July 2022, West Bengal Governor Jagdeep Dhankhar administered the oath of office to Anit Thapa as the Chief Executive of GTA. The five members of the GTA Sabha nominated by the West Bengal government took oath on 25 August 2022. Two Hamro Party councillors of the GTA joined Bharatiya Gorkha Prajatantrik Morcha on 5 November 2022. Binoy Tamang, who had won the GTA election on a TMC ticket but had left that party afterwards, joined Congress on 26 November 2023. He was expelled from Congress on 23 April 2024.

Summary of results of the Gorkhaland Territorial Administration election, 2022
Political Party	Seats Contested	Seats Won	Net Change in Seats
HP (IGJF)	45	8	First election
BGPM	36	27	First election
AITC	10	5	+5
CPI(M)	12	0	First election
INC	5	0	First election
Independent (169 contestants)	45	5	+5

=== Aftermath of West Bengal assembly elections 2026 ===
After the coming to power of the BJP government in West Bengal in 2026, the GTA Chief Executive Anit Thapa, who was an ally of TMC, resigned from the post of GTA Chief Executive and GTA Sabhasad on 17 June 2026. After his resignation, some other GTA Sabhasads belonging to BGPM, including GTA Deputy Chief Executive Sanchabir Subba and GTA Chairman Anjul Chauhan, announced their resignation. Around 24 GTA Sabha members, including GTA Deputy Chairman Rajesh Chowhan, had resigned from the GTA by 27 June 2026. On 7 September 2026, the West Bengal government appointed Smrutiranjan Mohanty, who was serving as the GTA Principal Secretary, as the Administrator of GTA.

== Regional political parties of Gorkhaland ==
- Gorkha Janmukti Morcha (GJM)
- Gorkha National Liberation Front (GNLF)
- Bharatiya Gorkha Prajatantrik Morcha (BGPM)
- Indian Gorkha Janshakti Front (IGJF)
- Communist Party of Revolutionary Marxists (CPRM)
- Akhil Bharatiya Gorkha League (ABGL)
- Gorkhaland Rajya Nirman Morcha (GRNM)
- Gorkha Rashtriya Congress (GRC)
- Jana Andolan Party (JAP)

=== Social organisations supporting Gorkhaland ===
- Bharatiya Gorkha Parisangh (Bhagop)

== See also ==
- Autonomous regions of India
- Gorkhaland movement
