= Emblem of West Bengal =

Official seal of the government of West Bengal, India and its history

- Armiger: Government of West Bengal
- Adopted: 1947 (first version); 2018 (second version); 2026 (current version)
- Relinquished: 2018 (first version); 2026 (second version)
- State: West Bengal
- Shield: Emblem of India
- Motto: Satyameva Jayate

The Emblem of West Bengal is the official seal of the Government of the Indian state of West Bengal.

The emblem consists of a circle depicting the National Emblem of India surrounded by the name of the state in English (i.e. West Bengal) and in the Bengali language (i.e. Bengali: পশ্চিমবঙ্গ, romanized: Paścimabaṅga).

== Historic emblems ==
The previous emblem was designed by Mamata Banerjee, the former Chief Minister of the state and was officially adopted in January 2018. It consisted of a circle depicting a globe with the state of West Bengal highlighted by a representation of the Bengali alphabet. The National Emblem of India appears above the globe and the emblem includes the name of the state in English (i.e. West Bengal) and in the Bengali language (i.e. Bengali: পশ্চিমবঙ্গ, romanized: Paścimabaṅga). The central element of the emblem was also used by the state government's Biswa Bangla campaign to promote the sale of traditional Bengali handicrafts and textiles. This emblem was replaced in 2026 by Bharatiya Janata Party Chief Minister Suvendu Adhikari after victory in 2026 election.

Prior to the adoption of the first emblem in 2018, the state government used the National Emblem of India for official purposes but had adopted a distinctive logo for marketing purposes. That logo, known as "Banglarmukh" (Face of Bengal), depicted a female face surround by a red veil.

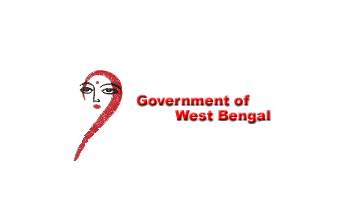
Banglarmukh emblem used until 2018

Second version of the emblem of West Bengal from 2018 to 2026.

Emblem of West Bengal till 2018 and again since May 2026

== Autonomous district councils in West Bengal ==
Gorkhaland

West Bengal has one autonomous district council, the Gorkhaland Territorial Administration, which adopted its own emblem in October 2014. The emblem is a circular seal featuring a locomotive of the Darjeeling Himalayan Railway, a woman picking tea leaves, a rhododendron flower and mountain peaks of the Himalayas surrounded by the name of the authority and two pairs of crossed Kukri daggers.

Emblem of the Gorkhaland Territorial Administration

== Government banner ==
The Government of West Bengal can be represented by a banner displaying the emblem of the state on a white field.

== See also ==
- State Emblem of India
- List of Indian state emblems
- Banglar Mati Banglar Jol
