= Gorkha Janmukti Morcha =

- Chairman: Bimal Gurung
- Secretary: Roshan Giri
- Founded: 7 October 2007 (19 years ago)
- Split from: Gorkha National Liberation Front
- Ideology: Gorkhaland statehood
- ECI status: Registered unrecognized Party
- Alliance: NDA (2009–2020, 2024–present); TMC+ (2020–2022)

Party flag
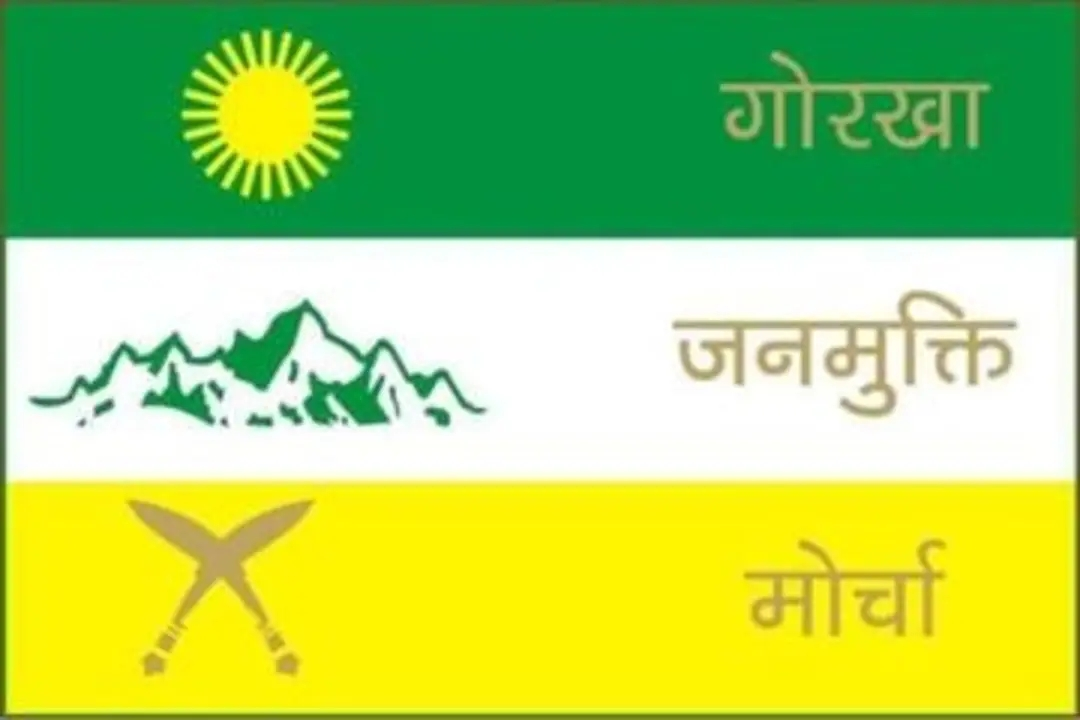

The Gorkha Janmukti Morcha (GJM) is a registered unrecognized political party, that campaigns for the creation of a separate state Gorkhaland within India, out of districts in the north of West Bengal. The party was launched on 7 October 2007. The faction led by Binay Tamang, which was created out of Gorkha Janmukti Morcha in 2017, merged into Gurung's GJM in December 2021 after Tamang's resignation, following which he joined the Trinamool Congress.

== History ==
Bimal Gurung, a former GNLF councillor of the Darjeeling Gorkha Hill Council, fell out with Subhash Ghisingh for "opposing the Sixth Schedule status for the hills and for his speeches against Subhash Ghisingh, the party president". Gurung, who was considered one of the most powerful leaders of the hills, stated to oppose the Sixth Schedule bill even though it had received Cabinet approval in the Indian Parliament. He founded GJM on 7 October 2007. The aims and the objectives of the new party was to "fight for the democratic right of the Indian Gorkhas living in India and (to) work unitedly for the creation of separate state for the people residing in the three Hill Sub-Division of Darjeeling, Siliguri Terai and Dooars areas.

== Opposition of the Sixth Schedule ==
GJM’s opposition of the sixth schedule and demand for Gorkhaland was supported by Dr Mahendra P. Lama, Dr Vimal Khawas, and other parties as well, viz. the BJP, the Congress, the Communist Party of Revolutionary Marxists (CPRM), and the Akhil Bharatiya Gorkha League (ABGL). The BJP organised an all-party meet attended by the Congress, the Trinamool Congress, the GJM, the ABGL, the CPRM, the Gorkha Rashtriya Congress, and the Bharatiya Gorkha Parisangh (BGP), which adopted a resolution asking the state to drop the Sixth Schedule proposal and remove Ghisingh as caretaker administrator of the Darjeeling Gorkha Hill Council (DGHC). The Hill parties did not want the Sixth Schedule as Clause 11 of the Sixth Schedule stated "this in principle Memorandum of Settlement is the full and final settlement of the Darjeeling Hill Areas issue and no further demands in this regard would be entertained". GJM burnt copies of the 1988 Memorandum of Settlement which had categorically stated, "the GNLF agreed to drop the demand for a separate State of Gorkhaland", thereby reviving the century-old demand of Gorkhaland.

The GNLF tried stalling the GJM through various means, and an FIR was also lodged against the party president Bimal Gurung for the attack on a former DGHC councilor K.B. Gurung, but anticipatory bail was granted to Bimal Gurung. GJM observed hunger strikes, indefinite strikes and prevented locally produced goods from reaching the rest of Bengal, as a protest against the imposition of the Sixth Schedule and for the removal of Subhash Ghisingh. A team was also deputed to New Delhi to apprise the national leaders about the general consensus of the people of the DGHC area because of which, L.K. Advani refused to support Buddhadeb Bhattacharya's bid to push Darjeeling into Sixth Schedule. The Bharatiya Janata Party's refusal of the sixth schedule status for DGHC pushed it to the Parliamentary Committee. The Parliamentary Committee in its findings suggested that "the Ministry of Home Affairs is required to make a fresh assessment of the ground realities all over again before proceeding with the Bills in the two Houses of Parliament". The Sixth Schedule bill was thus put in the back burner. The only supporter of the Sixth Schedule, Subhash Ghisingh, was banned from entering the hills. Ghisingh was finally forced to resign on 10 March 2008 as DGHC caretaker.

== Demand for Gorkhaland ==
"The name "Gorkhaland" is claimed to have been coined by Subhash Ghisingh on 5 April 1980, cf., his speech of 7 September 1989 at Darjeeling". After a violent agitation in the 1980s, which claimed more than 1200 lives in the hills, Subhash Ghisingh settled for the DGHC. After a lull of Ghisingh's 20 years rule, the demand for Gorkhaland was again revived by GJM under the leadership of Bimal Gurung. The total area of the proposed state is 6246 km^{2} and comprises Banarhat, Bhaktinagar, Birpara, Chalsa, Darjeeling, Jaigaon, Kalchini, Kalimpong, Kumargram, Kurseong, Madarihat, Malbazar, Mirik and Nagarkatta. Unlike the 1980s, GJM has maintained that the struggle for Gorkhaland would be through non-violence and non-cooperation.

GJM initially resorted to bandhs, hunger strikes and non-payment of utility bills to further their demand. It was quite enough to get the attention of the State Government, who invited them to Kolkata for bipartite talks. GJM refused to attends the talks as the state Government had set preconditions that they would discuss developmental issues but not Gorkhaland. The Chief Minister extended the invitation again and denied having set any preconditions for the talks.

The first tripartite talks between Government of India, Government of West Bengal and leaders of the Hill Parties headed by GJM was held on 8 September 2008. The hill delegation also submitted a 51-page memorandum to the Union Home Secretary, Government of India.

"The demand for a separate state within the Constitutional framework and within the Indian Union, consisting of Darjeeling District and the Dooars region of West Bengal is arguably the oldest and most outstanding demand in the country today. This demand for separate statehood is founded on the bedrock of a historical, economic and political rationale. Against the backdrop of socio-economic exploitation, political and cultural hegemony, misgovernance and exclusion, the demand has become an expression of the ingrained and deep rooted aspirations of the people to secure to themselves, and to their succeeding generations, the right to determine their own future."

After three and a half years of agitation for a state of Gorkhaland, the GJM reached an agreement with the state government to form a semi-autonomous body that will replace the DGHC to administer the Darjeeling hills. A bill for the creation of Gorkhaland Territorial Administration (GTA) will be introduced in the West Bengal Legislative Assembly soon. The GTA will have administrative, executive and financial powers but no legislative powers. The Memorandum of Agreement for GTA was signed on 18 July 2011 at Pintail Village near Siliguri in the presence of Union Home Minister P. Chidambaram, West Bengal chief minister Mamata Banerjee and Gorkha Janmukti Morcha leaders. The agreement was signed by West Bengal Home Secretary G.D. Gautama, Union Home Ministry Joint Secretary K.K. Pathak and GJM general secretary Roshan Giri. On 29 October 2011, the Gorkha Janmukti Morcha and the Akhil Bharatiya Adivasi Vikas Parishad (ABAVP), Dooars Unit signed an 18-point agreement at Mongpong, after which these organisations jointly proposed a new administrative body called the Gorkhaland and Adivasi Territorial Administration (GATA) in place of the GTA.

The Gorkha Janmukti Morcha announced that it would contest the GTA polls, which it had earlier threatened to boycott over the Justice Sen-headed committee recommendations on territorial inclusion of the Dooars and Terai that it had rejected. The Gorkha Janmukti Morcha announced the names of its GTA election nominees. Following Trinamool Congress' decision not to contest the GTA election, GJM won all 45 seats.

From the beginning of 2013, tensions started to surface between the TMC and the GJM. Following the announcement of the creation of the new state of Telangana, the hills erupted into a new phase of agitation. This was characterised by strikes, 'Janata Curfews' (in which townspeople stayed inside their houses), mass protests and the deployment of the CRPF into the hils. During the agitation, Banerjee favoured the Lepcha community with a new Development Board and encouraged other backward communities within the hills to seek further favours from the TMC. This had the effect of breaking down the Hills' united front and GJM's popularity. The TMC also gained electoral support in the hills during this period, as many sought to seek the favours of the new government. The GNLF also started to return to the hills in this period. Many GJM leaders were arrested and detained for extended periods for charges from several years before.

== Controversies ==
On 21 May 2010, Madan Tamang, the Akhil Bharatiya Gorkha League leader and a vocal opponent of GJM, was attacked and killed near the Planters Club, Darjeeling and GJM was suspected for this crime. Three people attacked Tamang directly and one of them hacked him with a sharp weapon. He was rushed to the Darjeeling District Hospital where he soon died. A few days later on 25 May, hundreds of mourners joined his funeral procession in Darjeeling. After the murder, the West Bengal government threatened action against Gorkha Janmukti Morcha, whose senior leaders were named in the police FIR, meanwhile hinting discontinuation of ongoing talks over interim arrangement with the Gorkha party, saying it had "lost popular support following the assassination".

On 8 February 2011, three GJM activists were shot dead at Shibshu (one of whom succumbed to her injuries later) by the police as they tried to enter Jalpaiguri district on a padyatra led by Bimal Gurung from Gorubathan to Jaigaon. This led to violence in the Darjeeling hills and an indefinite strike was called by GJM that lasted 9 days.

== Elections ==
Jaswant Singh, the BJP candidate, supported by the GJM, won the Darjeeling constituency in the Indian general elections 2009 defeating his nearest rival Jibesh Sarkar of the CPI(M) by a margin of over 2.5 lakh votes. The GJM had supported the BJP in lieu of the latter's positive outlook towards the formation of Gorkhaland as mentioned in their party manifesto for the Lok Sabha elections.

GJM candidates won three Darjeeling hill seats in the 2011 West Bengal state assembly election held on 18 April 2011. Trilok Dewan won from Darjeeling constituency, Harka Bahadur Chhetri from Kalimpong constituency, and Rohit Sharma from Kurseong constituency. Wilson Champramari, an independent candidate supported by GJM, also won from Kalchini constituency in the Dooars.

TMC hoped to gain the support of GJM for their candidate, Baichung Bhutia for Darjeeling (Lok Sabha constituency) in the Indian general elections in 2014. This was unsuccessful as the party supported the BJP candidate S.S. Ahluwalia. Ahluwalia has claimed that the state government, led by TMC has resorted to scare tactics and electoral fraud to win the election in Darjeeling. Ahluwalia defeated Bhutia by nearly 2 lakh votes.

On 18 September 2015, one of GJM's MLAs resigned in protest over the state government's cooperation with the Gorkhaland Territorial Administration. Three days later, the other two quitted the assembly.

Gurung's GJM was demanding a separate Gorkha state and in 2017 a massive agitation began which also turned violent. Because of Gurung's mishandling, the situation turned disastrous in which 10 people lost their lives in alleged police firing. When Gurung was on the run, the GJM broke up. Mamata Banerjee was successful in quelling the violent agitation after engineering a split between Bimal Gurung and Binay Tamang, a close aide to Gurung. Tamang alleged that Gurung wanted to get him killed and extended support to TMC along with his faction. Mamata Banerjee appointed Tamang as the chairperson of Gorkhaland Territorial Administration (GTA) on September 20, 2017. The state government slapped Gurung with a number of cases under laws relating to terrorism. Banerjee criticised Rajnath Singh, the then Union Home Minister, for holding a meeting with GJM leaders. Attempting to get Gurung behind the bars, the West Bengal police ran several operations in the hills which resulted in the killing of a few officers. One of the slain police officers was Sub-Inspector Amitabha Mullick. The Gurung faction helped BJP candidate Raju Bista win the 2019 Lok Sabha election.

The Calcutta High Court directed both factions of the GJM not to use the party symbol to contest polls.

In October 2020, Bimal Gurung resurfaced and announced unconditional support to Mamata Banerjee for the 2021 Assembly elections. He said that while Mamata Banerjee always kept her promises, the BJP never kept its word. The Banerjee government cleared their stance on the Gorkhaland issue by not supporting the demand for a separate state. Trinamool Congress allotted three seats (Kalimpong, Darjeeling, Kurseong) in the hills to GJM. Leaders of the Gurung faction had earlier promised to back the TMC in the rest of the 14 seats in Darjeeling, Jalpaiguri and Alipurduar districts. Even though both factions of the GJM (one led by Gurung and another led by Tamang) extended their support to TMC for the 2021 assembly election, they remained divided and both declared to field their candidates in each of the three seats which were allotted to them. As a result, the GJM faction headed by Tamang won only one out of three seats. In July 2021, Binay Tamang announced his resignation from all positions of the party and handed over flags of the party to Gurung. Anit Thapa became the acting president of the second faction of GJM.

Anit Thapa launched a new party Bharatiya Gorkha Prajatantrik Morcha (BGPM) on 9 September 2021. BGPM aligned with the TMC and formed an election committee to contest the GTA elections.

Binay Tamang joined All India Trinamool Congress on 24 December 2021.

== See also ==
- Tambasaling
- List of political parties in India
