= Sonia Jabbar =

Indian conservationist

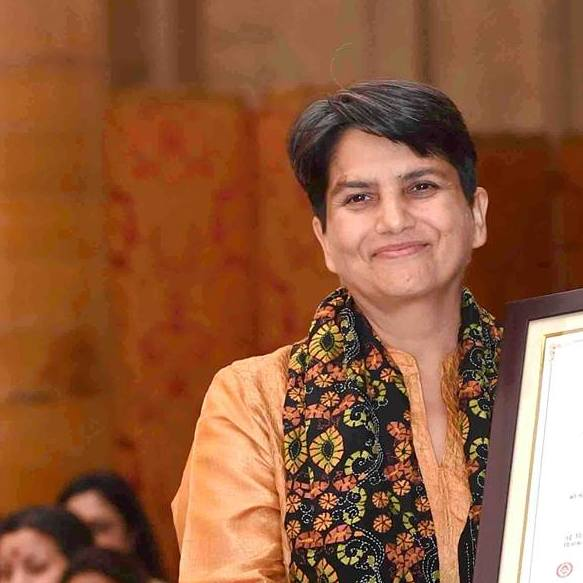
- Jabbar in 2017
- Known for: owning an elephant friendly tea plantation
- Children: one

Sonia Jabbar is an Indian plantation owner and wildlife conservationist. Starting in 2012, she transformed her tea plantation in Darjeeling to accommodate and facilitate the safe passage of elephants during their migration between Nepal and Assam. The Wildlife Trust of India recognised the plantation as the Green Corridor Champion of North Bengal; the University of Montana, US, certified it Elephant Friendly. She then initiated additional projects for elephant conservation, including a re-wilding project to create a 100-acre forest, and a pilot crop insurance project for neighbouring farms. In 2019, she was awarded the Nari Shakti Puraskar, India's highest civilian award for women.

== Life ==
Jabbar was a journalist in Kolkata until she inherited the family's large tea plantation in 2011. It is a 1200-acre plantation in the Darjeeling District of West Bengal. She was the fifth generation of her family to own the land since 1884, and surprisingly she is the third consecutive woman. She took over the role when her mother, Dolly, wanted to retire. Dolly Jabbar had taken on the job from Sonia's grandmother Sayeeda Badrunisa. The work in the tea industry is mostly done by women but that is not where the power lies. Tea workers can pick all day to find their wages, destined to buy essentials, is spent on drink or drugs by their husbands. And at the national level the tea workers unions ignore the needs of women. Jabbar has been trying to fix this working with an NGO to encourage discussion amongst her workers.

The occasion that brought her to notice took place in 2012 was when her workers advised her that elephants were about to invade 35 acres of the newly planted part of her tea plantation. She was told that the best idea would be to scare them away with flaming torches and fireworks, but Jabbar decided to do nothing. She spent a sleepless night worried that she had sacrificed her workers planting and her investment to rampaging elephants, but she loved wildlife. In the morning she was pleased to find that the damage was minimal and she realised that with planning this could all be tolerated.

In time she created 400m wide passageways through her plantation so that elephants could complete their traditional migration. The elephants way has been blocked by a 17 km long fence that prevents their usual route from Assam and the Mahananda basin to Nepal. Her plantation's policy allows the herds to still achieve this. In addition her plantation avoids building other barriers and they make sure drainage ditches cannot trap young elephants. Her procedures also make sure that chemicals are safely stored and the plantations mono-culture was modified to include other plants that were of interest to elephants.

She was given the Nari Shakti Puraskar award in 2019. The "2018" award was made in the Presidential Palace by the President of India. Prime Minister Narendra Modi was present. She was running a club for locals who were interested in the work and she had put aside 100 acres to be a native tree forest for the use of elephants and other wildlife.

In 2018 her work led to Nuxalbari's recognition as the first ever large elephant friendly plantation. The award was made by the Wildlife Friendly Enterprise Network and University of Montana. The Wildlife Trust of India noted her land as a Green Corridor Champion of North Bengal. She was noted by Vogue India amongst twelve women who were creating change during the climate crisis in 2020.

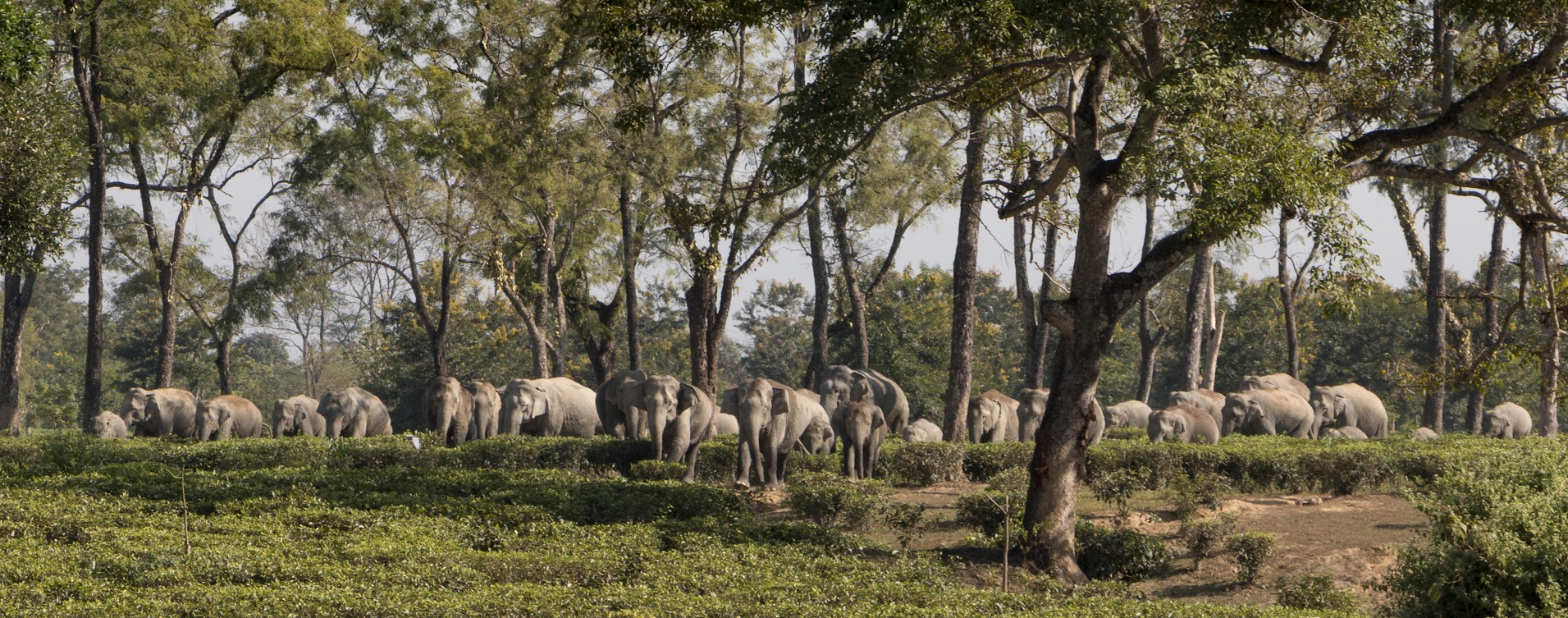
A herd of wild elephants in an elephant-friendly tea garden in India.
