= Tambasaling =

Tambasaling or Tamsaling is a proposed quasi-ethnic state within multicultural Nepal, which would contain many ethnic groups that are striving for autonomy, most notably the Tamang. The state was originally proposed before the 2008 election by Maoists.

The issue has resurfaced after the April 2015 Nepal earthquake, since the impact of the earthquake was perhaps felt more severely by Tamang people, as a group, than by any other groups in the region.

== See also ==
- Tamsaling Nepal Rastriya Dal
- Limbuwan
- Madhesh Province
