= Gorkha National Liberation Front =

Political party in India

- Abbreviation: GNLF
- Chairman: Mann Ghising
- Secretary: Neeraj Zimba
- Founder: Subhash Ghisingh
- Founded: 1980
- Headquarters: Dr. Zakir Hussain Road, Darjeeling (West Bengal)
- Ideology: Gorkhaland Autonomy
- Alliance: NDA (2021–present)

Gorkha National Liberation Front (GNLF) is a political party in the Darjeeling District of West Bengal, India. It was formed in 1980 by Subhash Ghisingh with the objective of demanding a Gorkhaland state within India.

== Early history ==
Part of the desire for independence stems from the notion that the Gurkhas are ethnically and culturally diverse from the rest of the population of West Bengal due to their roots within Gorkhali history. R. B. Rai describes the Darjeeling region as "social, political, and symbolic center" for all Indian Gorkhas, leading the movement to include the Nepali Language in the Indian constitution. Other ethnic identities in the region such as the Lepchas, the indigenous population of the area, and the Bhutias are looked at by Gorkhas as holding minority status. Language is one of the main distinguishing factors between Gorkhas and others in the Darjeeling district as out of a total of around one million people living in the hills of Darjeeling, 90 percent speak Nepali. It is also important to note that the Nepali spoken in the Darjeeling district is distinct from that spoken outside of the Darjeeling region as it emerged as a combination of several different “kura” or “Gorkhali” dialects. The British went even further in helping establish Gorkhas as a distinct ethnic identity as they institutionalized their racial classification through military policy. Over time this led to an even stronger sense of ethnic identity. A sense of otherness for Indian born Nepali speakers may also have been a strong contributing factor for some in their motivation to gain independence from India. Indian born Nepali speakers were not considered Nepalis by other Nepali speakers, but were also looked at as foreigners by Indians. Some members of the Indian government such as ex-Prime Minister Morarji Desai who stated that if Indians wanted to speak Nepali that they should “Go to Nepal” clearly share this stance on the Nepali language. The tie between ethnic heritage and the Gorkha National Liberation Front is clearly represented in the flag’s use of the traditional sword of the Gorkha’s, the Kukri.

A contributing factor to the push for an independent Gorkhaland beyond ethnic identity was an economic downturn brought on by corruption and mismanagement of resources in the Darjeeling region by the Indian government during post colonial rule. Although the region was recognized as having several valuable resources such as tea, lumber and tourism, misappropriation led to long periods of economic hardship. These circumstances of economic uncertainty mixed with ethnic identity conflicts made the region a potential site for unrest. Other political parties have also supported actions or conflicts by Gorkhaland movement members like the GNLF, such as the Kamtapur Progressive Party. The instability also leads to uncertainty pertaining to potential conflict between people living in the Hills and people living in the Plains. This uncertainty is especially relevant when considering the differences in language and ethnic orientation in those separate spaces.

During the 1980s, the GNLF led an intensive and often violent campaign for the creation of a separate Gorkhaland state in the Nepali-speaking areas of northern West Bengal (Darjeeling, Dooars and Terai). The movement reached its peak around 1985–1986. On 22 August 1988, the GNLF, under Subhash Ghisingh, signed the Darjeeling Hill Accord, which created the Darjeeling Gorkha Hill Council (DGHC) in exchange for the GNLF giving up its demand for Gorkhaland.

== Electoral history ==
=== State assembly ===
GNLF boycotted the West Bengal state assembly elections in 1991. In the assembly elections in 1996, 2001, and 2006, GNLF won three assembly seats, one each from Darjeeling, Kalimpong and Kurseong.

=== Lok Sabha ===
In 1989, GNLF candidate Inderjeet Khuller, a former journalist covering the Gorkhaland agitation and a close friend of Subhash Ghisingh, won the Darjeeling (Lok Sabha constituency) elections. GNLF supported Inderjeet as the Indian National Congress candidate in 1991, who won the Lok Sabha elections riding on GNLF support. GNLF boycotted the Lok Sabha elections in 1996, 1998, and 1999, which were won by CPI(M) candidates. Ahead of the 2004 Lok Sabha elections, the GNLF supported the Congress party candidate Dawa Narbula, who won with a big margin from the Darjeeling constituency. In the 2009 elections, GNLF was out of power in the hills and did not field any candidate or support any party and the Lok Sabha seat was won by Jaswant Singh of BJP with the support from GJMM.

== Darjeeling Gorkha Hill Council ==
The GNLF administered the DGHC with Subhash Ghisingh as the chairman of the council from 1988 to 2004 for three successive terms. Subhash Ghisingh was appointed the sole caretaker of the DGHC from 2005 to 2008 as no election for the DGHC was held.

== Sixth Schedule ==
A Memorandum of Settlement (MoS) was signed between the Central Government, the State Government and the GNLF for the establishment of a Sixth Schedule tribal council called the Gorkha Hill Council in the DGHC area on 6 December 2005. After some initial support, there was widespread opposition to the Sixth Schedule council, led by leaders like Madan Tamang of ABGL.

== Downfall ==
The DGHC elections were due in 2004. However, the government decided not to hold elections and instead made Subhash Ghisingh the sole caretaker of the DGHC till the Sixth Schedule council was established. Resentment among the former councillors of DGHC grew rapidly. Among them, Bimal Gurung, once the trusted aide of Ghising, decided to break away from the GNLF. Riding on a mass support for Prashant Tamang, an Indian Idol contestant from Darjeeling, Bimal quickly capitalised on the public support he received for supporting Prashant, and was able to overthrow Ghisingh from the seat of power. Ghising decided to shift residence to Jalpaiguri and GNLF lost most of its support and cadres to Gorkha Janmukti Morcha, a new party headed by Bimal Gurung.

== West Bengal Legislative Assembly elections 2011 ==
After lying in political hibernation for three years, GNLF chief Subhash Ghisingh announced that his party would contest the West Bengal Legislative Assembly elections in 2011. Subhash Ghisingh returned to Darjeeling on 8 April 2011 ahead of the assembly elections after three years of "exile". All the three GNLF candidates, Bhim Subba from Darjeeling, Prakash Dahal from Kalimpong and Pemu Chettri from Kurseong lost the elections held on 18 April 2011.

== Splinter group ==
Gorkha National Liberation Front (C.K. Pradhan) or GNLF(C) is a splinter group of Gorkha National Liberation Front in Darjeeling district of West Bengal, India. GNLF(C) was formed in 2002 after the murder of GNLF leader C.K. Pradhan.

Pradhan's widow Sheila Pradhan claimed that he was killed by GNLF since he was about to break away from the main party. After the assassination, Sheila and others floated GNLF(C). The party is led by (Retd) Col. D.K. Pradhan of Kalimpong who is C.K. Pradhan's brother. GNLF(C) was a member of the Democratic Front, an alliance of parties such as CPRM and ABGL in the Darjeeling area. It a member of the Gorkhaland Task Force, an alliance of political parties and social organisations formed to demand a separate state of Gorkhaland.
