= Darjeeling Gorkha Hill Council =

Autonomous body (1988–2012)

Darjeeling Gorkha Hill Council (DGHC; 1988–2012), also once known for a short period of time as Darjeeling Gorkha Autonomous Hill Council, was a semi-autonomous body that looked after the administration of the hills of Darjeeling District in the state of West Bengal, India. DGHC had three subdivisions under its authority: Darjeeling, Kalimpong, and Kurseong and some areas of Siliguri subdivision.

== Background ==
Gorkha National Liberation Front led by Subhash Ghisingh raised the demand for the creation of a state called Gorkhaland within India to be carved out of the hills of Darjeeling and areas of Dooars and Siliguri terai contiguous to Darjeeling. A violent agitation erupted in the Darjeeling hills from 1986 to 1988 in which 1200 people lost their lives.

== Formation ==
The semi-autonomous Darjeeling Gorkha Hill Council was the result of the signing of the Darjeeling Gorkha Hill Council Agreement between the Central Government of India, the West Bengal Government and the Gorkha National Liberation Front in Kolkata on 22 August 1988. The ceremony took place at the Banquet Hall, Raj Bhavan (The Governor's Palace) at 10 A.M. The signatories to this tripartite agreement were: C.G. Somaih, Union Home Secretary (on the behalf of the Central Government of India), R.N. Sengupta, the State Chief Secretary (on the behalf of the Government of West Bengal) and Subhash Ghisingh (on the behalf of Gorkha National Liberation Front as the representative of the people of Darjeeling District). The Union Home Minister, Buta Singh, and the West Bengal Chief Minister, Jyoti Basu, also put their signatures on the agreement.

The Darjeeling Gorkha Hill Council Act, 1988 (West Bengal Act XIII of 1988) was enacted by the West Bengal legislature which was assented to by the President of India and was first published in the Calcutta Gazette, Extraordinary of 15 October 1988. The council had wide control over finance, education, health, agriculture and economic development within its jurisdiction.

== DGHC terms ==
The DGHC was administered from 1988 to 2005 for three successive terms by the GNLF with Subhash Ghisingh as the chairman. The fourth DGHC elections were due in 2005. However, the government decided not to hold elections and instead made Subhash Ghisingh the sole caretaker administrator of the DGHC. Ghisingh signed a Memorandum of Settlement with the government on 6 December 2005 to set up a Sixth Schedule tribal council called the Gorkha Hill Council in place of the DGHC. Opposition from various political parties, social organizations and the people prevented the implementation of this agreement.

In March 2008, Ghisingh was forced to resign as caretaker after losing public support in the Darjeeling hills to Bimal Gurung-led Gorkha Janmukti Morcha. From March 2008 to August 2012, the West Bengal government appointed IAS officers as administrators of DGHC and no election to the council was held in that period.

== Gorkhaland Territorial Administration ==
The Gorkha Janmukti Morcha signed a tripartite agreement with the state and central governments on 18 July 2011 for the formation of the Gorkhaland Territorial Administration (GTA) in the Darjeeling hills. Till the GTA body was formed, the DGHC continued in the Darjeeling hills with a Board of Administrators composed of the three MLAs from Darjeeling constituency, Kurseong constituency and Kalimpong constituency, the Darjeeling District Magistrate, and the DGHC Administrator. The GTA replaced the DGHC after the GTA body was formed in August 2012 through a West Bengal state act.

== See also ==
Chowrasta Darjeeling

Mahakal temple
