= Indian Gorkha =

Ethnolinguistic group in India

- Gorkha regiment soldiers Men of the 2nd Battalion, 5th Gorkha Rifles (Frontier Force) of the Indian Army operating alongside soldiers from the 82nd Airborne Division of the US Army in 2013

Regions with significant populations
- Majority in: Sikkim (62.6%) significant minority in: Arunachal Pradesh; Himachal Pradesh; Manipur; Meghalaya; Mizoram; Assam; Uttarakhand; West Bengal; Nagaland; and other Indian states

Languages
- Nepali; other languages of Nepal

Religion
- Hinduism · Kirant Mundhum · Christianity · Buddhism

Related ethnic groups
- Burmese Gurkha

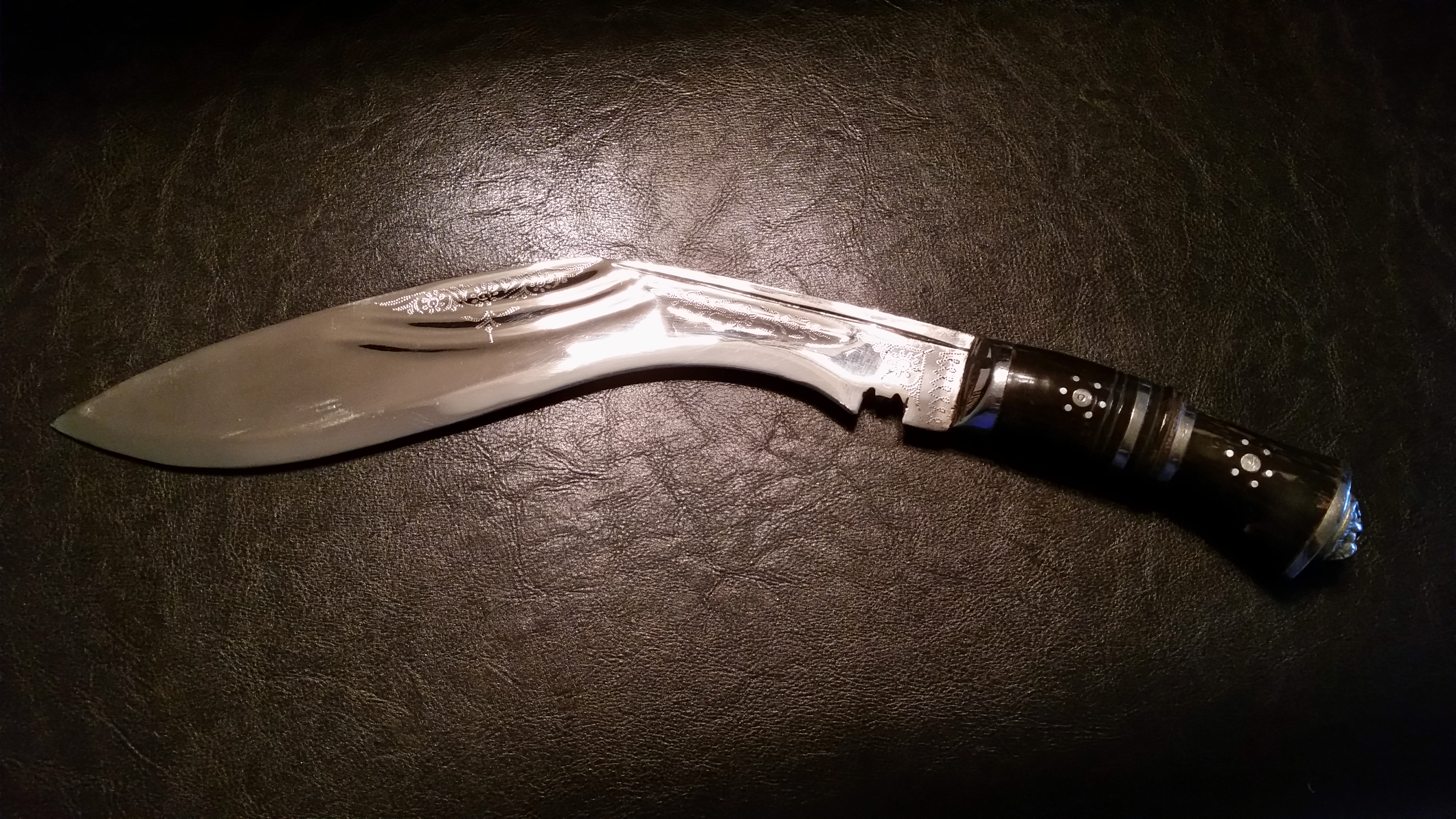
Kukri is a traditional Gorkha knife.

Indian Gorkhas (commonly known as Gorkha community) are an Indian ethno-cultural group speaking Nepali as a common language. They inhabit mainly the states of Sikkim, West Bengal, Northeast India and Uttarakhand, including their diaspora elsewhere in India and abroad. While Gorkha was a Kingdom founded by the King Dravya Shah in 1559 CE. Currently, Gorkha is a district in Nepal

Indian Gorkhas are citizens of India as per the gazette notification of the Government of India on the issue of citizenship of the Gorkhas from India. The Nepali language is included in the eighth schedule of the Indian Constitution. However, the Indian Gorkhas are faced with a unique identity crisis with regard to their Indian citizenship because of the Indo-Nepal Treaty of Peace and Friendship (1950) that permits "on a reciprocal basis, the nationals of one country in the territories of the other the same privileges in the matter of residence, ownership of property, participation in trade and commerce, movement and other privileges of a similar nature".

== Ethnicities and castes ==
The Gorkhali Parbatiya ethnic groups include the Khas-Parbatiyas such as Bahun (hill Brahmins), Chhetri (hill Kshatriyas), Thakuri, Badi, Kami, Damai, Sarki, Gandarbha, Kumal, etc. Other Tibeto-ethnic groups include Tamang, Gurung, Magar,Rai, Newar, Bhujel (Khawas), Sherpa and Thami.

== Population ==
Nepali speakers in India by year
Census	Nepali speakers	Growth
1971	1,419,835	—
1981	1,360,636	▼ -4.17
1991	2,076,645	▲+52.62
2001	2,871,749	▲+38.29
2011	2,926,168	▲+1.89

As per the 2011 Census, a total of 2,926,168 people in India spoke Nepali as their mother tongue. The largest populations can be found in West Bengal – 1,155,375 (+12.97% from 2001 Census), Assam – 596,210 (+5.56%), Sikkim – 382,200 (+12.87%), Uttarakhand – 106,399 (+16.86%), Arunachal Pradesh – 95,317 (+00.42%), Himachal Pradesh – 89,508 (+27.37%), Maharashtra – 75,683 (+19.22%), Manipur – 63,756 (+38.61%), Meghalaya – 54,716 (+4.91%), Nagaland – 43,481 (+27.06%), and Mizoram – 8,994 (+0.51%). Apart from this, there are additional speakers of languages such as Limbu (40,835), Rai (15,644), Sherpa (16,012) and Tamang (20,154). So the combined strength of Nepali and the other four Gorkha languages comes to 3,018,813.

As per the 2001 Census, a total of 2,871,749 people in India spoke Nepali as their mother tongue. The largest populations were in West Bengal – 1,022,725 (+18.87% from 1991 Census), Assam – 564,790 (+30.58%), Sikkim – 338,606 (+32.05%), Uttarakhand – 355,029 (+255.53%), Arunachal Pradesh – 94,919 (+16.93%), Himachal Pradesh – 70,272 (+50.64%), Maharashtra – 63,480 (+59.69%), Meghalaya – 52,155 (+6.04%), Manipur – 45,998 (−1.08%), Nagaland – 34,222 (+6.04%), and Mizoram – 8,948 (+8.50%). As per the 1991 Census, the number of Nepali speakers in India was 2,076,645.

=== Arunachal Pradesh ===
As per the 2011 Census, districts with the largest Nepali populations are West Kameng – 14,333 (17.1% of the total population) Lohit – 22,988 (13.77%), and Dibang Valley – 14,271 (22.99%). Tehsils with the largest proportion of Nepalis are Koronu (48.49%), Kibithoo (6.5%), Sunpura (34.47%), Vijoynagar (41.8%), and Roing (26.0%).

As per the 2001 Census, districts with the largest Nepali populations are West Kameng – 13,580 (18.2% of the total population) Lohit – 22,200 (15.77%), and Dibang Valley – 15,452 (26.77%). Tehsils with the largest proportion of Nepalis are Koronu (55.35%), Kibithoo (50.68%), Sunpura (42.28%), Vijoynagar (42.13%), and Roing (32.39%).

=== Assam ===
As per the 2011 Census, districts with the largest ethnic Nepali populations are Sonitpur – 135,525 (7.04% of the total population) Tinsukia – 99,812 (7.52%), and Karbi Anglong – 51,496 (5.38%). Tehsils with the largest proportion of Nepalis are Sadiya (26.2%), Na Duar (14.88%), Helem (14.35%), Margherita (13.47%), and Umrangso (12.46%).

As per the 2001 Census, districts with the largest ethnic Nepali populations are Sonitpur – 131,261 (7.81% of the total population) Tinsukia – 87,850 (7.64%), and Karbi Anglong – 46,871 (5.76%). Tehsils with the largest proportion of Nepalis are Sadiya (27.51%), Na Duar (16.39%), Helem (15.43%), Margherita (13.10%), and Umrangso (12.37%).

During the 1991 Census, the districts with the largest concentrations were Sonitpur – 91,631 (6.43%), Tinsukia – 76,083 (7.91%), and Karbi Anglong – 37,710 (5.69%).

=== Manipur ===
As per the 2011 census, Tehsils with the largest proportion of Nepali people are Sadar Hills West (33.0%), Saitu-Gamphazol (9.54%), and Lamshang (10.85%). Districts with the largest Nepali population are Senapati – 39,039 (8.15%), Imphal West – 10,391 (2.01%) and Imphal East – 6,903 (1.51%).

This is how the previous censuses counted the number of Nepali speakers in Manipur:

- 1961 Census: 13,571
- 1971 Census: 26,381
- 1981 Census: 37,046
- 1991 Census: 46,500
- 2001 Census: 45,998 (*)
- 2011 Census: 63,756

=== Meghalaya ===
Gorkha population is mostly concentrated in the districts of East Khasi Hills (37,000 or 4.48%) and Ribhoi (10,524 or 4.07%). Tehsils with the largest concentration include Myliem (8.18%) and Umling (6.72%).

Among the cities, the highest concentration of Nepali speakers can be found in Shillong Cantonment (29.98%), Shillong (9.83%), Pynthorumkhrah (7.02%), Nongmynsong (26.67%), Madanrting (17.83%), and Nongkseh (14.20%).

This is how the previous censuses counted the number of Nepali speakers in Meghalaya:

- 1961: 32,288
- 1971: 44,445
- 1981: 61,259
- 1991: 49,186
- 2001: 52,155
- 2011: 54,716

=== Mizoram ===
As per the 2011 Census, there are a total of 9,035 Gorkhas in Mizoram. Of this, 65% or 5,944 are concentrated in Tlangnuam Tehsil of Aizawl district, where they form 1.9% of the population. The Central Gorkha Mandir Committee operates a total of 13 Hindu temples in Mizoram and these are the only Hindu places of worship in the state.

=== Nagaland ===
Most of the Nepali speaking population are found in the districts of Dimapur (21,596 or 5.70%) and Kohima (9,812 or 3.66%). Tehsils with the largest concentration are Naginimora (7.48%), Merangmen (6.78%), Niuland (6.48%), Kuhoboto (7.04%), Chümoukedima (7.07%), Dhansiripar (6.09%), Medziphema (9.11%), Namsang (8.81%), Kohima Sadar (6.27%), Sechü-Zubza (5.03%), and Pedi (7.61%).

=== Sikkim ===
The state of Sikkim is the only state in India with a majority ethnic Nepali population. The Sikkim census of 2011 found that Sikkim was the least populated state of India. Sikkim's population according to the 2011 Census was 610,577, and has grown by approximately 100,000 since the last census. The Nepali/Gorkhali language is the lingua franca of Sikkim, while Tibetan (Bhutia) and Lepcha are spoken in certain areas. As per the 2011 Census, there were a total of 453,819 speakers of various Tibetan languages (Nepali – 382,200, Limbu – 38,733, Sherpa – 13,681, Tamang – 11,734 and Rai – 7,471). Out of this, 20.14% (91,399) were Tibetan Limbu/Tamang, 6.23% (28,275) were Dalit and 73.63% including Manger are in General category.

According to the census, there are a total of 53,703 Limbu and 37,696 Tamang in Sikkim, of whom a majority speak the Nepali language as their mother tongue. Also, small numbers of Bhotia and Lepcha also speak the Nepali language as their mother tongue. As per the 2011 Census, there were a total of 69,598 Bhotia in Sikkim (including Sherpa, Tamang, Gurung and Tibetan. etc), but only 58,355 were speaking languages such as Sikkimese and Sherpa. Out of the 42,909 Lepcha there were only 38,313 speakers for the Lepcha language.

=== Uttarakhand ===
As per the 2011 census, the total number of Nepali language speakers is 106,399, constituting 1.1% of the total population of the state.

=== West Bengal ===
As per the 2001 Census, there are a total of 1,034,038 ethnic Gorkhas in West Bengal, of which 1,022,725 are speakers of the Nepali language and 11,313 are speakers of languages such as Tamang and Sherpa. The population in the Darjeeling and Kalimpong districts are 748,023 (46.48% of the total population) and Jalpaiguri – 234,500 (6.99%). Most of the ethnic Nepali population in West Bengal live in the Gorkhaland Territorial Administration region. About 7.56% of the Nepalis were Dalit, belonging to castes such as Kami and Sarki (population of 78,202 in 2001). The two tribes classified as Scheduled Tribe (Limbu and Tamang) constituted 16% of the Nepali population according to the census. The remaining 76% belonged to general category.

As per the 2011 Census, there were a total of 1,161,807 speakers of various Nepalese languages. Out of this 7.24% was Dalit (84,110) and 16.62% (193,050) were tribal Tamang/Limbu. Remaining 76.14% were General category.

=== Forced displacement ===
Nepali-speaking people in the states of Northeast India have faced violence and ethnic cleansing. In 1967, more than 8,000 Nepali-speaking people were driven out of Mizoram, while more than 2,000 in Manipur met with the same fate in 1980. Tens of thousands of Nepali-speaking people were banished from Assam (in 1979) and Meghalaya (in 1987) by militant groups.

The biggest displacement occurred in Meghalaya, when the Khasi Students Union (KSU) targeted Nepali speakers living in the eastern part of the state. More than 15,000 Nepali speakers were driven out, while about 10,000 were reduced to living in subhuman life in the refugee camps of Shillong. Gorkha labourers in the coal mines in Jowai were targeted, and as a result of their murders dozens of Gorkha children starved to death in the next few weeks. In 2010, there were riots between Khasis and Gorkhas, which left several Gorkhas dead. One elderly Gorkha man was burnt alive.

In 1980s, most of the Gorkha in Nagaland were forced to forfeit their land, and 200 of them were murdered near Merapani in Wokha district.

== Politics ==
The Gorkhaland movement is a campaign to create a separate state of India in the Gorkhaland region of West Bengal for the Nepali speaking Indians. The proposed state includes the hill regions of the Darjeeling district, Kalimpong district and Dooars regions that include Jalpaiguri, Alipurduar and parts of Coochbehar districts. A demand for a separate administrative unit in Darjeeling has existed since 1909, when the Hillmen's Association of Darjeeling submitted a memorandum to Minto-Morley Reforms demanding a separate administrative setup.

=== Darjeeling Gorkha Hill Council ===
Darjeeling Gorkha Hill Council (DGHC) (1988–2012), also once known for a short period of time as Darjeeling Gorkha Autonomous Hill Council was a semi-autonomous body that looked after the administration of the hills of Darjeeling District in the state of West Bengal, India. DGHC had three subdivisions under its authority: Darjeeling, Kalimpong, and Kurseong and some areas of Siliguri subdivision.

Led by Subhash Ghisingh, Gorkhas raised the demand for the creation of a state called Gorkhaland within India to be carved out of the hills of Darjeeling and areas of Dooars and Siliguri terai contiguous to Darjeeling. A violent agitation erupted in the Darjeeling hills from 1986 to 1988 in which 1200 people lost their lives.

The semi-autonomous Darjeeling Gorkha Hill Council was the result of the signing of the Darjeeling Gorkha Hill Council Agreement between the Central Government of India, the West Bengal Government and the Gorkha National Liberation Front in Kolkata on 22 August 1988.

=== Gorkhaland Territorial Administration ===
The DGHC did not fulfill its goal of forming a new state, which led to the downfall of Subhash Ghisingh and the rise of another party Gorkha Janmukti Morcha (GJM) headed by Bimal Gurung in 2007, which launched a second agitation for a Gorkhaland state. After three years of agitation for a state of Gorkhaland led by GJM, the GJM reached an agreement with the state government to form a semi-autonomous body to administer the Darjeeling hills. The Memorandum of Agreement for Gorkhaland Territorial Administration(GTA) was signed on 18 July 2011 at Pintail Village near Siliguri in the presence of Union Home Minister P. Chidambaram, West Bengal chief minister Mamata Banerjee, the then Darjeeling Lok Sabha MP Jaswant Singh and Gorkha Janmukti Morcha leaders. The agreement was signed by West Bengal Home Secretary G.D. Gautama, Union Home Ministry Joint Secretary K.K. Pathak and Gorkha Janmukti Morcha general secretary Roshan Giri.

== Notable people ==
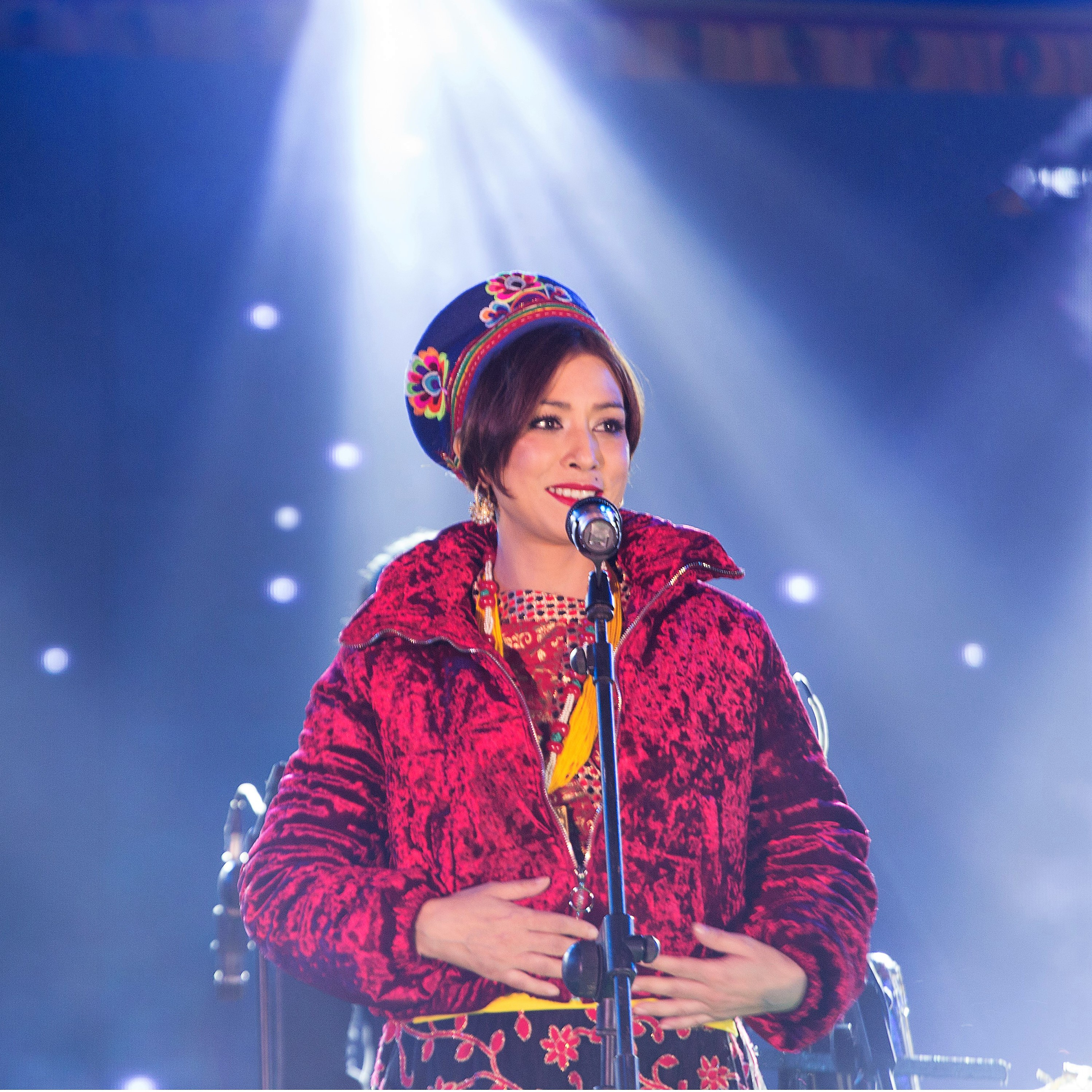
Navneet Aditya Waiba, folk singer

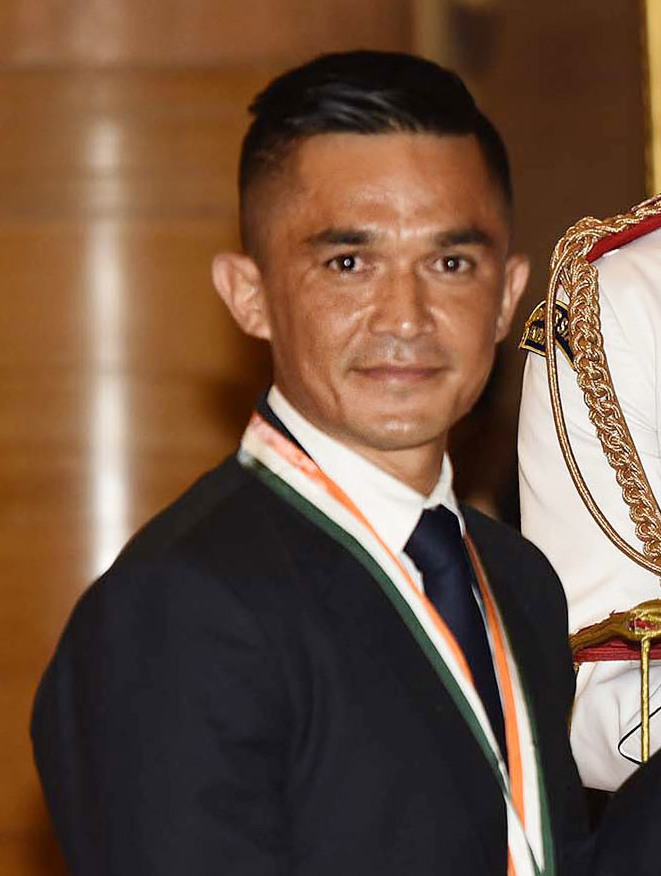
Sunil Chhetri, all time scorer for the Indian national team, in 2021

=== Actors ===
- Rewati Chetri – Model and actress
- Ganesh – Kannada film actor
- Bharti Singh – Comedian
- Niruta Singh – Actress in Nepali cinema
- Mala Sinha – Indian actress in Hindi and Bengali cinemas
- Pratibha Sinha – Bollywood Indian actress (daughter of actress Mala Sinha and Nepali actor C.P. Lohani)
- Geetanjali Thapa – Bollywood actress (National Film Award for Best Actress recipient 2013)

=== Cinematographers ===
- Binod Pradhan

=== Military ===
- Subedar Major Ganju Lama – Victoria Cross recipient
- Major Durga Malla – Indian freedom fighter
- Trilochan Pokhrel – Indian freedom fighter
- Colonel Lalit Rai – Vir Chakra recipient for his actions in the Kargil War in 1999.
- Captain Ram Singh Thakuri – Indian freedom fighter who composed a number of patriotic songs including Qadam Qadam Badhaye Ja
- Lieutenant-Colonel Dhan Singh Thapa – Param Vir Chakra recipient
- Brigadier Sher Jung Thapa (Hero of Skardu) – Mahavir Chakra recipient for his actions in the Indo-Pakistani War of 1947

=== Musicians ===
- Louis Banks – jazz musician
- Bipul Chettri – singer, composer
- Ranjit Gazmer – Bollywood film musician
- Amber Gurung – Composer, singer, lyricist. Composer of national anthem of Nepal
- Sukmit Gurung – singer
- Aruna Lama – Nepali singer from Darjeeling
- Kunti Moktan – Nepali playback singer from Darjeeling
- Adrian Pradhan – singer, songwriter, guitarist. Former 1974 AD member of Nepal
- Sonam Sherpa – lead guitarist of Parikrama band
- Poornima Shrestha – Bollywood playback singer
- Phiroj Shyangden – singer, songwriter, guitarist. Former founding member of 1974 AD band of Nepal
- Prashant Tamang – singer, actor, winner of Indian Idol Season 3
- Shanti Thatal – composer, singer, producer
- Hira Devi Waiba – pioneer of Nepali folk songs, singer
- Navneet Aditya Waiba – folk singer
- Gopal Yonzon – singer, musician, playwright
- Karma Yonzon – composer, singer, producer

=== Sports ===
==== Athletics ====
- Basanta Bahadur Rana – Racewalker

==== Archery ====
- Tarundeep Rai – Archer, Asian Games 2011 silver medalist, Arjuna Award recipient 2005, Padma Shri recipient 2020

==== Boxing ====
- Birender Singh Thapa – Boxer
- Debendra Thapa – Boxer
- Shiva Thapa – Boxer (youngest Indian boxer to qualify for the Olympic Games)

==== Cricket ====
- Jay Bista – Cricketer
- Gokul Sharma – Captain of Assam cricket team
- Uma Chetry - Cricketer

==== Football ====
- Ajay Chhetri – footballer
- Amar Bahadur Gurung – footballer
- Anirudh Thapa – footballer
- Anju Tamang – women's footballer
- Anjana Thapa – women's footballer
- Asish Rai – footballer
- Ayush Chhetri – footballer
- Bijay Chhetri – footballer
- Bijendra Rai – footballer
- Bikash Jairu – footballer
- Chandan Singh Rawat – footballer
- Crispin Chettri – football manager and footballer
- Israil Gurung – footballer
- Komal Thatal – footballer
- Lalit Thapa – footballer
- Nagen Tamang – footballer
- Narender Thapa – footballer
- Nim Dorjee Tamang – footballer
- Nirmal Chettri – footballer
- Pinky Bompal Magar – women's footballer
- Puran Bahadur Thapa – footballer
- Ram Bahadur Chettri – footballer
- Robin Gurung – footballer
- Simran Gurung – women's footballer
- Sanju Pradhan – footballer
- Shyam Thapa – footballer
- Sunil Chhetri – captain of the India national football team and Bengaluru FC. Recipient of Arjuna Award (2011) and Padma Shri (2019)
- Sushmita Lepcha – women's footballer
- Uttam Rai – footballer
- Vinit Rai – footballer

==== Hockey ====
- Bharat Chettri – Hockey player (former captain of Indian hockey team)
- Bir Bahadur Chettri – Hockey player
- Chaman Singh Gurung – Hockey player
- Krishan Bahadur Pathak – Hockey player

==== Shooting ====
- Jitu Rai – Shooter, recipient of Arjuna Award (2015), Khel Ratna (2016) and Padma Shri (2020).
- Pemba Tamang – Shooter

==== Skiing ====
- Kishor Rahtna Rai – Alpine skier
- Gupta Bahadur Gurung – Cross-country skier

=== Writers ===
- Indra Bahadur Rai – Nepali writer and literary critic from Darjeeling, India.
- Hari Prasad Gorkha Rai
- Kedar Gurung
- Kumar Pradhan
- Lil Bahadur Chettri – Padma Shri award recipient (2020) for his contribution towards Nepali literature.
- Peter J. Karthak - Writer, musician, journalist.
- Prajwal Parajuly – English language writer and novelist
- Ganga Prasad Pradhan – Translator of the Nepali Bible, co-author of an English-Nepali dictionary, author of children's textbooks.
- Parijat real name Bishnu Kumari Waiba – Original writer of The Blue Mimosa Birthplace Darjeeling
- Agam Singh Giri – Nepali language poet and lyricist from Darjeeling.
- Birkha Bahadur Muringla -Padma Shri award recipient.
- Tulsiram Sharma Kashyap
- Mahananda Poudyal

=== Politicians ===
- Chobilal Upadhyaya – first president of the Assam Pradesh Congress Committee
- Shanta Chhetri – Member of Parliament
- B. B. Gurung – third Chief Minister of Sikkim.
- Bimal Gurung – Leader of Gorkha Janmukti Morcha (GJM)
- Ajoy Edwards - Politician and social worker
- Harka Bahadur Chhetri - Politician and former legislator
- Bishal Lama – MLA from Kalchini
- Bhaskar Sharma – MLA from Margherita, Assam
- Damber Singh Gurung – Indian Gorkha representative in the Constituent Assembly of India
- Dawa Narbula – Member of the Indian National Congress (INC), former Member of Parliament
- Ganesh Kumar Limbu – MLA from Barchalla, Assam
- Madan Tamang –Former President of Akhil Bharatiya Gorkha League (ABGL)
- Mala Rajya Laxmi Shah - Member of parliament from Tehri Garhwal
- Moni Kumar Subba – Member of INC, Assam
- Nar Bahadur Bhandari – Former Chief Minister of Sikkim
- Ram Prasad Sharma – MP of Tezpur
- Pawan Kumar Chamling – 5th Chief Minister of Sikkim, founder and president of Sikkim Democratic Front and the longest serving chief minister in India.
- Prem Singh Tamang – Current Chief Minister of Sikkim, founder of Sikkim Krantikari Morcha.
- Prasanta Pradhan – CPI(M) Leader
- Prem Das Rai – Former Member of Parliament
- Subhash Ghisingh – Founder of Gorkhaland Movement in India and founder of political party GNLF
- Raju Bista – Member of Parliament from Darjeeling Lok Sabha constituency, 2019
- Dil Kumari Bhandari – former and first women member of parliament from Sikkim. Wife of former Chief Minister of Sikkim Narbahadur Bhandari. Birthplace Darjeeling
- Neeraj Zimba – MLA from Darjeeling and top leader of Gorkha National Liberation Front.
- Indra Hang Subba – Member of Parliament from Sikkim, elected in 2019.
- Ruden Sada Lepcha – MLA from Kalimpong
- Tanka Bahadur Rai – former speaker of the Assam Legislative Assembly

=== Others ===
- Chokila Tshering – diplomat and foreign secretary
- Harsh Vardhan Shringla – diplomat and foreign secretary
- Balkrishna – Indian billionaire of Nepali origin
- Draupadi Ghimiray – Social activist, Padma Shri award recipient.
- Tulsi Ghimire – Film director/producer
- Mahendra P. Lama – Founding vice-chancellor of Sikkim University
- Nitesh R Pradhan – Journalist and singer
- Pratima Puri – First news reader of Doordarshan
- Rangu Souriya – Social worker
- Meenakshi Madan Rai - Chief Justice of the Patna High Court

== See also ==
- Gorkha Kingdom
- Gurkha
- India–Nepal relations
- Kirata Kingdom
