= Darjeeling Lok Sabha constituency =

Lok Sabha Constituency in West Bengal, India

Coordinates: 27°02′20″N 88°15′50″E

Darjeeling WB-4
- Lok Sabha constituency

Constituency details
- Country: India
- Region: East India
- State: West Bengal
- Assembly constituencies: Kalimpong; Darjeeling; Kurseong; Matigara-Naxalbari; Siliguri; Phansidewa; Chopra
- Established: 1957-present
- Total electors: 1,437,126
- Reservation: None

Member of Parliament
- 18th Lok Sabha
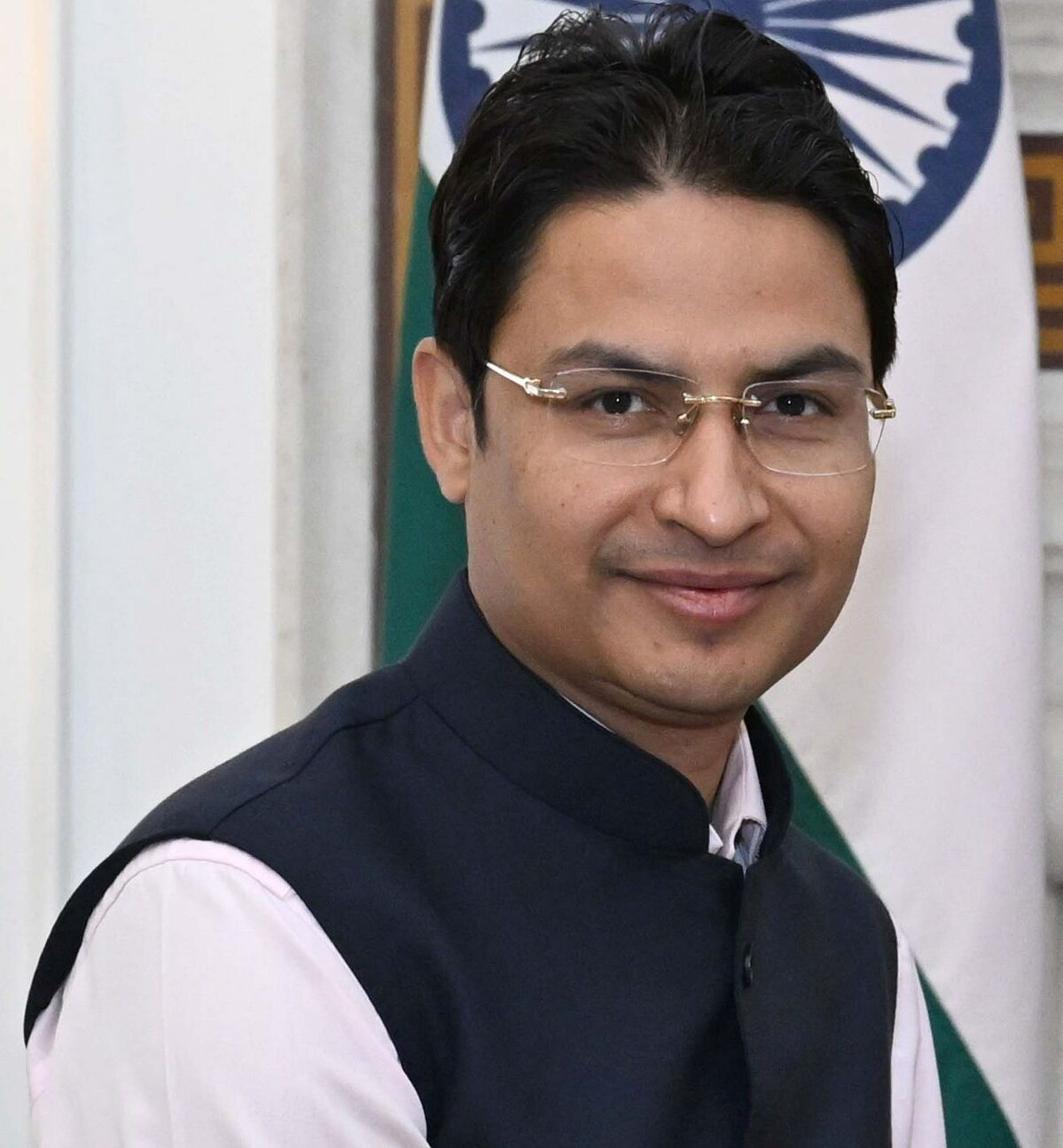
- Incumbent Raju Bista
- Party: BJP
- Alliance: NDA
- Elected year: 2024

Darjeeling Lok Sabha constituency is one of the 543 parliamentary constituencies in India. The constituency centres on Darjeeling in West Bengal. While five assembly segments are in Darjeeling district, one assembly segment is in Kalimpong district and one assembly segment is in Uttar Dinajpur district.

== Assembly segments ==
Parliamentary constituencies in West Bengal - 1. Cooch Behar, 2. Alipurduars, 3. Jalpaiguri, 4. Darjeeling, 5. Raiganj, 6. Balurghat, 7. Maldaha Uttar, 8. Maldaha Dakshin, 9. Jangipur, 10. Baharampur, 11. Murshidabad, 12. Krishnanagar, 13. Ranaghat, 14. Bangaon, 15. Barrackpore, 16. Dum Dum, 17. Barasat, 18. Basirhat, 19. Jaynagar, 20. Mathurapur, 21. Diamond Harbour, 22. Jadavpur, 23. Kolkata Dakshin, 24. Kolkata Uttar, 25. Howrah, 26. Uluberia, 27. Serampore, 28. Hoghly, 29. Arambagh, 30. Tamluk, 31, Kanthi, 32. Ghatal, 33. Jhargram, 34. Medinipur, 35. Purulia, 36. Bankura, 37. Bishnupur, 38. Bardhaman Purba, 39. Bardhaman Durgapur, 40. Asansol, 41. Bolpur, 42. Birbhum

As per order of the Delimitation Commission in respect of the delimitation of constituencies in West Bengal, parliamentary constituency no. 4 Darjeeling is composed of the following segments from 2009:

| # | Name | District | Member | Party | 2024 Lead |
|---|---|---|---|---|---|
| 22 | Kalimpong | Kalimpong | Bharat Chhetri | BJP | BJP |
| 23 | Darjeeling | Darjeeling | Noman Rai | BJP | BJP |
| 24 | Kurseong | Darjeeling | Sonam Lama | BJP | BJP |
| 25 | Matigara-Naxalbari (SC) | Darjeeling | Anandamoy Barman | BJP | BJP |
| 26 | Siliguri | Darjeeling | Shankar Ghosh | BJP | BJP |
| 27 | Phansidewa (ST) | Darjeeling | Durga Murmu | BJP | BJP |
| 28 | Chopra | Uttar Dinajpur | Hamidul Rahman | AITC | AITC |

== Members of Parliament ==
| Year | Name | Party |
|---|---|---|
| 1957 | Theodore Manaen | Indian National Congress |
| 1962 | Theodore Manaen | Indian National Congress |
| 1967 | Maitreyee Basu | Independent |
| 1971 | Ratanlal Brahmin | Communist Party of India (Marxist) |
| 1977 | Krishna Bahadur Chhetri | Indian National Congress |
| 1980 | Ananda Pathak | Communist Party of India (Marxist) |
| 1984 | Ananda Pathak | Communist Party of India (Marxist) |
| 1989 | Indrajit Khullar | Gorkha National Liberation Front |
| 1991 | Indrajit Khullar | Indian National Congress |
| 1996 | Ratna Bahadur Rai | Communist Party of India (Marxist) |
| 1998 | Ananda Pathak | Communist Party of India (Marxist) |
| 1999 | S. P. Lepcha | Communist Party of India (Marxist) |
| 2004 | Dawa Narbula | Indian National Congress |
| 2009 | Jaswant Singh | Bharatiya Janata Party |
| 2014 | S. S. Ahluwalia | Bharatiya Janata Party |
| 2019 | Raju Bista | Bharatiya Janata Party |
| 2024 | Raju Bista | Bharatiya Janata Party |

== Election results ==
Vote share of Winning candidates
| 2024 | 51.18% |
| 2019 | 59.19% |
| 2014 | 42.75% |
| 2009 | 51.50% |
| 2004 | 44.70% |
| 1999 | 44.24% |
| 1998 | 44.75% |
| 1996 | 45.91% |
| 1991 | 48.07% |
| 1989 | 56.49% |
| 1984 | 41.96% |
| 1980 | 45.75% |
| 1977 | 41.81% |
| 1971 | 33.19% |
| 1967 | 39.27% |
| 1962 | 35.03% |
| 1957 | 43.27% |

=== 2024 ===
2024 Indian general election: Darjeeling
| Party | Candidate | Votes | % | ±% |
|---|---|---|---|---|
| BJP | Raju Bista | 679,331 | 51.18 | |
| AITC | Gopal Lama | 500,806 | 37.73 | |
| INC | Munish Tamang | 83,374 | 6.28 | |
| NOTA | None of the Above | 18,021 | 1.36 | |
| IND | 5 Independent Candidates | 31,932 | 2.41 | |
| OTH | 6 Other Party Candidates | 13,948 | 1.05 | |
| Majority | | 178,525 | 13.45 | |
| Turnout | | | | |
| BJP hold | | Swing | | |

=== 2019 ===
2019 Indian general election: Darjeeling
| Party | Candidate | Votes | % | ±% |
|---|---|---|---|---|
| BJP | Raju Bista | 750,067 | 59.19 | |
| AITC | Amar Singh Rai | 336,624 | 26.56 | |
| INC | Sankar Malakar | 65,186 | 5.14 | |
| CPI(M) | Saman Pathak | 50,524 | 3.99 | |
| NOTA | None of the Above | 10,625 | 0.84 | |
| IND | 5 Independent Candidates | 36,367 | 2.87 | |
| OTH | 7 Other Party Candidates | 17,877 | 1.41 | |
| Majority | | 413,443 | 32.63 | |
| Turnout | | 1,269,666 | 78.80 | |
| BJP hold | | Swing | | |

=== 2014 ===
2014 Indian general election: Darjeeling
| Party | Candidate | Votes | % | ±% |
|---|---|---|---|---|
| BJP | S. S. Ahluwalia | 488,257 | 42.75 | |
| AITC | Bhaichung Bhutia | 291,018 | 25.48 | |
| CPI(M) | Saman Pathak | 167,186 | 14.64 | |
| INC | Sujay Ghatak | 90,076 | 7.89 | |
| IND | Mahendra P. Lama | 55,767 | 4.88 | |
| NOTA | None of the Above | 18,045 | 1.58 | |
| IND | Rabindra Roy Basunia | 6,100 | 0.53 | |
| IND | Arun Kumar Agarwal | 5,449 | 0.48 | |
| OTH | 6 Other Party Candidates | 20,111 | 1.76 | |
| Majority | | 197,239 | 17.27 | |
| Turnout | | 1,142,009 | 80.20 | |
| BJP hold | | Swing | | |

=== 2009 ===
2009 Indian general election: Darjeeling
| Party | Candidate | Votes | % | ±% |
|---|---|---|---|---|
| BJP | Jaswant Singh | 497,649 | 51.50 | |
| CPI(M) | Jibesh Sarkar | 244,360 | 25.29 | |
| INC | Dawa Narbula | 187,809 | 19.43 | |
| BSP | Haridas Thakur | 5,083 | 0.53 | |
| CPI(ML)L | Abhijit Majumdar | 3,818 | 0.40 | |
| AMB | Niranjan Saha | 3,717 | 0.38 | |
| IPFB | Baidyanath Roy | 2,686 | 0.28 | |
| IND | Arun Kumar Agarwal | 3,227 | 0.33 | |
| IND | Nitu Jai | 4,786 | 0.50 | |
| IND | Ram Ganesh Baraik | 13,236 | 1.37 | |
| Majority | | 253,289 | 26.21 | |
| Turnout | | 966,371 | 79.50 | |
| Swing to BJP from INC | | Swing | | |

=== 2004 ===
2004 Indian general election: Darjeeling
| Party | Candidate | Votes | % | ±% |
|---|---|---|---|---|
| INC | Dawa Narbula | 396,973 | 44.70 | |
| CPI(M) | Moni Thapa | 295,557 | 33.28 | |
| BJP | Dr. G. S. Yonzone | 113,972 | 12.83 | |
| BSP | Bimal Dutta | 10,758 | 1.21 | |
| IND | 6 Independent Candidates | 70,823 | 7.97 | |
| Majority | | 101,416 | 11.42 | |
| Turnout | | 888,083 | | |
| Swing to INC from CPI(M) | | Swing | | |

=== 1999 ===
1999 Indian general election: Darjeeling
| Party | Candidate | Votes | % | ±% |
|---|---|---|---|---|
| CPI(M) | S. P. Lepcha | 256,826 | 44.24 | |
| INC | Nar Bahadur Khatiwara | 1,44,857 | 24.96 | |
| AITC | Tarun Roy | 1,27,603 | 21.98 | |
| IND | R. B. Rai | 31,719 | 5.46 | |
| IND | Sunil Roy | 11,797 | 2.03 | |
| IND | Krishna Bhakta Paurel | 5,118 | 0.88 | |
| IND | Sampad Roy | 2,551 | 0.44 | |
| Majority | | 1,11,969 | 19.28 | |
| Turnout | | 5,90,023 | 46.21 | |
| CPI(M) hold | | Swing | | |

=== 1998 ===
1998 Indian general election: Darjeeling
| Party | Candidate | Votes | % | ±% |
|---|---|---|---|---|
| CPI(M) | Ananda Pathak | 280,589 | 44.75 | |
| INC | Prasanta Nandy | 1,58,033 | 25.21 | |
| AITC | Dawa Nurbula | 1,14,688 | 18.29 | |
| IND | R. B. Rai | 51,681 | 8.24 | |
| IND | Paresh Ray | 12,609 | 2.01 | |
| BSP | Surjit Rasaily | 3,727 | 0.59 | |
| IND | L. B. Pariyar | 3,048 | 0.49 | |
| IND | Matiur Rahman | 2,594 | 0.41 | |
| Majority | | 1,22,556 | 19.54 | |
| Turnout | | 6,41,281 | 51.78 | |
| CPI(M) hold | | Swing | | |

=== 1996 ===
1996 Indian general election: Darjeeling
| Party | Candidate | Votes | % | ±% |
|---|---|---|---|---|
| CPI(M) | R. B. Rai | 357,291 | 45.91 | |
| INC | K. B. Chettri | 2,80,167 | 36.00 | |
| BJP | Geeta Chatterjee | 68,421 | 8.79 | |
| IND | Gazendra Gurung | 29,499 | 3.79 | |
| IND | Krishna Bhakta Pourel | 16,511 | 2.12 | |
| IND | Usmani Mustak | 14,432 | 1.85 | |
| IND | Kamini Mohan Roy | 7,474 | 0.96 | |
| IND | Purnendu Chatterjee | 2,359 | 0.30 | |
| IUML | Mohammad Zamil Ahamad | 2,095 | 0.27 | |
| Majority | | 77,124 | 9.91 | |
| Turnout | | 8,43,297 | 69.52 | |
| Swing to CPI(M) from INC | | Swing | | |

=== 1991 ===
1991 Indian general election: Darjeeling
| Party | Candidate | Votes | % | ±% |
|---|---|---|---|---|
| INC | Inder Jeet | 354,645 | 48.07 | |
| CPI(M) | Ananda Pathak | 3,02,748 | 41.04 | |
| BJP | Ankesh Acharjya | 54,969 | 7.45 | |
| IND | Premjit Singha | 8,270 | 1.12 | |
| IND | Krishna Bhakta Poudyal | 7,864 | 1.07 | |
| IND | Altaf Hussain | 3,385 | 0.46 | |
| BSP | Arun Prasad Sarker | 1,942 | 0.26 | |
| JP | Kamini Mohan Roy | 1,746 | 0.24 | |
| LKD | Saty Prasad | 1,342 | 0.18 | |
| IND | Banshidhar Mital | 864 | 0.12 | |
| Majority | | 51,897 | 7.03 | |
| Turnout | | 7,79,568 | 71.11 | |
| Swing to INC from GNLF | | Swing | | |

=== 1989 ===
1989 Indian general election: Darjeeling
| Party | Candidate | Votes | % | ±% |
|---|---|---|---|---|
| GNLF | Inderjeet | 435,070 | 56.49 | |
| CPI(M) | Ananda Pathak | 2,89,965 | 37.65 | |
| IND | Mohan Kumar Rai | 18,843 | 2.45 | |
| IND | Krishna Bhakta Poudyal | 9,668 | 1.26 | |
| ABGL | J. D. S. Rai | 4,426 | 0.57 | |
| IND | Birendra Nath Barman | 3,744 | 0.49 | |
| BSP | Arun Prasad Sarkar | 2,452 | 0.32 | |
| IND | P. P. Rai | 2,009 | 0.26 | |
| IND | Durga Pradhan | 1,534 | 0.20 | |
| IND | Kamini Mohan Roy | 1,294 | 0.17 | |
| IND | Parbananda Barman | 1,125 | 0.15 | |
| Majority | | 1,45,105 | 18.84 | |
| Turnout | | 7,88,359 | 74.26 | |
| Swing to GNLF from CPI(M) | | Swing | | |

=== 1984 ===
1984 Indian general election: Darjeeling
| Party | Candidate | Votes | % | ±% |
|---|---|---|---|---|
| CPI(M) | Ananda Prasad Pathak | 228,679 | 41.96 | |
| INC | Dawa Narbula | 2,27,290 | 41.71 | |
| IND | Siddhartha Sankar Ray | 80,557 | 14.78 | |
| IND | Padam Bahadur Rai | 5,010 | 0.92 | |
| IND | Sampad Roy | 3,441 | 0.63 | |
| Majority | | 1,389 | 0.25 | |
| Turnout | | 5,61,738 | 68.13 | |
| CPI(M) hold | | Swing | | |

=== 1980 ===
1980 Indian general election: Darjeeling
| Party | Candidate | Votes | % | ±% |
|---|---|---|---|---|
| CPI(M) | Ananda Pathak | 185,612 | 45.75 | |
| INC(I) | K. B. Chettri | 1,67,451 | 41.27 | |
| INC(U) | Chaudhary Abdul Karim | 20,153 | 4.97 | |
| JP(S) | Paul Mantosh | 8,468 | 2.09 | |
| JP | Mohhammed Ekramul Haque | 8,123 | 2.00 | |
| IND | Lakshmi Kanta Joshi | 5,192 | 1.28 | |
| IND | Tapan Kumar Biswas | 5,045 | 1.24 | |
| IND | Ranendra Nath Barma | 3,960 | 0.98 | |
| IND | Sampad Kumar Roy | 1,748 | 0.43 | |
| Majority | | 18,161 | 4.48 | |
| Turnout | | 4,19,397 | 56.66 | |
| Swing to CPI(M) from INC | | Swing | | |

=== 1977 ===
1977 Indian general election: Darjeeling
| Party | Candidate | Votes | % | ±% |
|---|---|---|---|---|
| INC | Krishna Bahadur Chhetri | 109,520 | 41.81 | |
| CPI(M) | Ratanlal Brahmin | 91,040 | 34.75 | |
| IND | Madan Kumar Rai | 32,835 | 12.53 | |
| ABGL | Amar Prakash Dimmal | 12,509 | 4.78 | |
| IND | Dharma Shamsher Basnet | 4,306 | 1.64 | |
| IND | Janaklal Agarwal | 4,098 | 1.56 | |
| IND | Bhattacherjee Brijamohan | 3,984 | 1.52 | |
| IND | Dalbahadur Singh Gahatraj | 1,925 | 0.73 | |
| IND | Thakur Prasad | 1,109 | 0.42 | |
| IND | Ruth Karthak Lepchani | 627 | 0.24 | |
| Majority | | 18,480 | 7.06 | |
| Turnout | | 2,72,135 | 43.55 | |
| Swing to INC from CPI(M) | | Swing | | |

=== 1971 ===
1971 Indian general election: Darjeeling
| Party | Candidate | Votes | % | ±% |
|---|---|---|---|---|
| CPI(M) | Ratanlal Brahmin | 84,408 | 33.19 | |
| ABGL | G. S. Gurung | 72,131 | 28.36 | |
| IND | Maitreyee Bose | 66,035 | 25.97 | |
| IND | Thakur Prasad | 16,946 | 6.66 | |
| PSP | Amal Kumar Bhattacharya | 14,793 | 5.82 | |
| Majority | | 12,277 | 4.83 | |
| Turnout | | 2,68,931 | 53.54 | |
| Swing to CPI(M) from Independent | | Swing | | |

=== 1967 ===
1967 Indian general election: Darjeeling
| Party | Candidate | Votes | % | ±% |
|---|---|---|---|---|
| IND | Maitreyee Bose | 97,476 | 39.27 | |
| INC | Theodore Manaen | 95,645 | 38.54 | |
| CPI(M) | R. K. Sinha | 42,136 | 16.98 | |
| ABJS | B. M. Bhattacharjee | 12,942 | 5.21 | |
| Majority | | 1,831 | 0.73 | |
| Turnout | | 2,58,528 | 58.39 | |
| Swing to Independent from INC | | Swing | | |

=== 1962 ===
1962 Indian general election: Darjeeling
| Party | Candidate | Votes | % | ±% |
|---|---|---|---|---|
| INC | Theodore Manaen | 66,129 | 35.03 | |
| CPI | Ratanlal Brahmin | 57,702 | 30.57 | |
| ABGL | Chandra Kanta Tamang | 46,127 | 24.44 | |
| ABJS | Biraja Mohan Bhattacharjee | 11,730 | 6.21 | |
| IND | Ramnath Dubey | 7,070 | 3.75 | |
| Majority | | 8,427 | 4.46 | |
| Turnout | | 1,97,796 | 46.97 | |
| INC hold | | Swing | | |

=== 1957 ===
1957 Indian general election: Darjeeling
| Party | Candidate | Votes | % | ±% |
|---|---|---|---|---|
| INC | Theodore Manaen | 60,460 | 43.27 | |
| CPI | Ratanlal Brahmin | 49,785 | 35.63 | |
| IND | Jatindra N. Mitra | 29,484 | 21.10 | |
| Majority | | 10,675 | 7.64 | |
| Turnout | | 1,39,729 | 41.67 | |
| INC win (new seat) | | | | |

== See also ==
- Darjeeling district
- List of constituencies of the Lok Sabha
