= Democratic Federation =

Democratic Federation may refer to:

- The original name of the Social Democratic Federation, a former British political party
- The original name of Justice (newspaper), published by the Social Democratic Federation
- Democratic Federation (Sardinia), a former political party
- Democratic Federation of Burma, a political organization

== See also ==
- Democratic Federation of Labour (Morocco)
- Democratic Revolutionary Youth Federation (India)
