= Communist Party of Revolutionary Marxists =

- Chairman: Ratna Bahadur Rai
- Secretary: Taramani Rai
- Founded: 1996
- Split from: Communist Party of India (Marxist)
- Headquarters: Darjeeling
- Youth wing: Democratic Revolutionary Youth Federation
- Ideology: Marxism; Gorkha nationalism Regionalism
- Political position: Left-wing
- Alliance: Confederation of Indian Communists and Democratic Socialists

Communist Party of Revolutionary Marxists (CPRM) is a political party based in the Darjeeling District and Kalimpong District of the Indian state of West Bengal. CPRM was formed in 1996 by Communist Party of India (Marxist) dissidents (a major group of the local CPI(M) leadership in Darjeeling) like former State Minister and Rajya Sabha MP Tamang Dawa Lama, Lok Sabha MP R.B. Rai and others, who were dissatisfied with the peace settlement the Left-Front government signed with the Gorkha National Liberation Front (GNLF). CRPM participates in the Confederation of Indian Communists and Democratic Socialists. CPRM's youth organization is known as Democratic Revolutionary Youth Federation (DRYF).

CPRM struggles for a separate Gorkhaland state to be formed within India. It contested the Darjeeling Gorkha Hill Council election in 1999 but won no seat. Before 1999, one CPRM member, Padam Lama, was a member of the DGHC. Ahead of the 1999 DGHC elections, CPRM was part of the United Front, an alliance consisting of CPRM, Akhil Bharatiya Gorkha League (ABGL), Indian National Congress, Bharatiya Gorkha Janashakti, Communist Party of India, Bharatiya Nepali Bir Gorkha and Sikkim Rashtriya Mukti Morcha.

Since the failure of the United Front, CPRM formed the People's Democratic Front, as a united opposition to GNLF in the Darjeeling hills, together with Akhil Bharatiya Gorkha League, Indian National Congress, Gorkha National Liberation Front (C.K. Pradhan) and Bharatiya Janata Party.

CPRM is currently part of the Democratic Front, an alliance of the CPRM, ABGL, BJP and other parties. CPRM had earlier supported the Gorkha Janmukti Morcha (GJM), but when GJM agreed to the setting up of an Interim Setup in Darjeeling instead of a full-fledged state of Gorkhaland, CPRM became opposed to it.

After unsuccessfully trying to put up consensus candidates in the three constituencies of Darjeeling with other parties, CPRM decided not to filed any candidates of its own after the other parties - GJM and ABGL - decided to fight the elections independently. In 2009, 2014 and 2019 general elections, they supported the Bharatiya Janata Party candidates for the Darjeeling constituency.
