= Darjeeling Assembly constituency =

Constituency of the West Bengal legislative assembly in India

Darjeeling
- Constituency No. 23 for the West Bengal Legislative Assembly
- Interactive Map Outlining Darjeeling Assembly Constituency

Constituency details
- Country: India
- Region: East India
- State: West Bengal
- District: Darjeeling
- Lok Sabha constituency: Darjeeling
- Established: 1951
- Total electors: 210,995
- Reservation: None

Member of Legislative Assembly
- 18th West Bengal Legislative Assembly
- Incumbent Noman Rai
- Party: Bharatiya Janata Party
- Elected year: 2026
- Preceded by: Neeraj Zimba

Most Successful parties in Darjeeling Assembly constituency
1. Independent (5 times) (26.3%)
2. Akhil Bharatiya Gorkha League (4 times) (21.1%)
3. Gorkha National Liberation Front (3 times) (15.8%)
4. Bharatiya Janata Party (3 times) (15.8%)
5. Gorkha Janmukti Morcha (2 times) (10.5%)
6. Communist Party of India (Marxist) (2 times) (10.5%)

Darjeeling Assembly constituency is an assembly constituency in Darjeeling district in the Indian state of West Bengal.

== Overview ==
As per orders of the Delimitation Commission, No. 23 Darjeeling Assembly constituency covers Darjeeling municipality, Darjeeling Pulbazar community development block and Dhootria Kalej Valley, Ghum Khasmahal, Sukhia-Simana, Rangbhang Gopaldhara, Pokhriabong I, Pokhriabong II, Pokhriabong III, Lingia Maraybong, Permaguri Tamsang, Plungdung and Rangbull gram panchayats of Jorebunglow Sukhiapokhri community development block.

Darjeeling Assembly constituency is part of No. 4 Darjeeling (Lok Sabha constituency).

== Members of the Legislative Assembly ==
Year	Name	Party
1952	Dalbahadur Singh Gahatraj	Independent
1957	Deo Prakash Rai	Independent
1962	Deo Prakash Rai	Akhil Bharatiya Gorkha League
1967	Deo Prakash Rai	Independent
1969	Deo Prakash Rai	Akhil Bharatiya Gorkha League
1971	Deo Prakash Rai	Akhil Bharatiya Gorkha League
1972	Deo Prakash Rai	Akhil Bharatiya Gorkha League
1977	Deo Prakash Rai	Independent
1982	Dawa Lama	Communist Party of India (Marxist)
1987	Dawa Lama	Communist Party of India (Marxist)
1991	Narendra Kumai	Independent
1996	Nar Bahadur Chhetri	Gorkha National Liberation Front
2001	D.K. Pradhan	Gorkha National Liberation Front
2006	Pranay Rai	Gorkha National Liberation Front
2011	Trilok Dewan	Gorkha Janmukti Morcha
2016	Amar Singh Rai	Gorkha Janmukti Morcha
2019^	Neeraj Zimba	Bharatiya Janata Party
2021	Neeraj Zimba	Bharatiya Janata Party
2026	Noman Rai	Bharatiya Janata Party

- ^ by-election

== Election results ==
Vote share of Winning candidates
2026	35.72%
2021	40.88%
2019 (by-poll)	61.80%
2016	59.85%
2011	78.51%
2006	52.97%
2001	63.49%
1996	50.89%
1991	54.51%
1987	90.88%
1982	50.27%
1977	31.75%
1972	45.34%
1971	46.62%
1969	57.68%
1967	51.03%
1962	49.17%
1957	33.30%
1951	48.05%

=== 2026 ===
2026 West Bengal Legislative Assembly election: Darjeeling
Party	Candidate	Votes	%	±%
BJP	Noman Rai	62,076	35.72	▼5.16
BGPM	Bijoy Kumar Rai	56,019	32.23	New entry
IND	Ajoy Lucas Edwards	48,635	27.98	New entry
IND	Jatin Ghalay	1,937	1.11	New entry
INC	Madhap Rai	1,729	0.99	▼0.61
RAJSP	Milan Thokar	1,371	0.79	New entry
NOTA	Nota	2,040	1.17	▼0.34
Majority		6,057	3.49	▼9.13
Turnout		173,807	82.37	▲14.03
Registered electors		210,995		▼14.46
BJP hold		Swing	4.56	

=== 2021 ===
2021 West Bengal Legislative Assembly election: Darjeeling
Party	Candidate	Votes	%	±%
BJP	Neeraj Tamang Zimba	68,907	40.88	
IND	Keshav Raj Sharma	47,631	28.26	
IND	Pemba Tshering	38,240	22.68	
IND	Suraj Gurung	2,855	1.69	
NOTA	None of the Above	2,540	1.51	
IND	Nima Gyamtsho Sherpa	2,088	1.24	
CPI(M)	Gautam Raj Rai	1,913	1.13	
IND	Anjani Sharma	1,677	0.99	
IND	Milan Thokar	1,397	0.83	
IND	Bharat Prakash Rai	1,327	0.79	
Majority		21,276	12.62	
Turnout		168,575	68.34	
BJP hold		Swing		

=== 2019 by-election ===
In the West Bengal Legislative Assembly by-election 2019, Neeraj Zimba of BJP defeated his nearest rival Binay Tamang (Independent). The by-election was held because the sitting MLA Amar Singh Rai resigned to contest in the Lok Sabha election.

2019 West Bengal Legislative Assembly by-election: Darjeeling
Party	Candidate	Votes	%	±%
BJP	Neeraj Zimba	88,161	61.80	
GJM(B) (Note: Gorkha Janmukti Morcha (Binay Faction))	Binay Tamang	41,623	29.18	
JAP	Amar Lama	3,242	2.27	
CPI(M)	K. B. Wattar	2,087	1.46	
IND	Swaraj Thapa	1,768	1.24	
IND	Sarda Rai Subba	1,270	0.89	
IDRF (Note: Indian Democratic Republican Front)	Sanjay Thakuri	1,183	0.83	
GRC	Amar Luksom	1,166	0.82	
ABGL	Biplov Rai	668	0.47	
NOTA	None of the Above	1,487	1.04	−2.25
Majority		46,538	32.62	+1.30
Turnout		142,675	59.71	
Swing to BJP from GJM		Swing		

=== 2016 ===
2016 West Bengal Legislative Assembly election: Darjeeling
Party	Candidate	Votes	%	±%
GJM	Amar Singh Rai	95,386	59.85	
AITC	Sarda Rai Subba	45,473	28.53	
IND	Govind Chettri	8,982	5.64	
NOTA	None of the Above	5,817	3.65	
GRC	Ashok Kumar Lepcha	3,716	2.33	
Majority		49,913	31.32	
Turnout		159,374	67.11	
GJM hold		Swing		

=== 2011 ===
2011 West Bengal Legislative Assembly election: Darjeeling
Party	Candidate	Votes	%	±%
GJM	Trilok Kumar Dewan	120,532	78.51	
GNLF	Bim Subba	13,977	9.10	
ABGL	Bharati Tamang	11,198	7.29	
CPI(M)	K. B. Wattar	5,353	3.49	
INC	Nahakul Chandra Chhetri	2,463	1.60	
Majority		106,555	69.41	
Turnout		153,523	70.44	
Swing to GJM from GNLF		Swing		

=== 2006 ===
2006 West Bengal Legislative Assembly election: Darjeeling
Party	Candidate	Votes	%	±%
GNLF	Pranay Rai	58,646	52.97	Winner
IND	Amar Lama	36,636	33.09	
CPI(M)	K. B. Wattar	12,755	11.52	
AITC	Gopal Singh Chhetri	2,673	2.41	
Majority		22,010	19.88	
Turnout		1,10,710		
GNLF hold		Swing		

=== 2001 ===
2001 West Bengal Legislative Assembly election: Darjeeling
Party	Candidate	Votes	%	±%
GNLF	D. K. Pradhan	66,839	63.49	Winner
IND	Sawan Rai	21,576	20.49	
CPI(M)	K. B. Watter	9,694	9.21	
INC	Parvati Pradhan	4,445	4.22	
BJP	Kishore Chandra Rai	2,723	2.59	
Majority		45,263	43.00	
Turnout		1,05,277	60.59	
GNLF hold		Swing		

=== 1996 ===
1996 West Bengal Legislative Assembly election: Darjeeling
Party	Candidate	Votes	%	±%
GNLF	Nar Bahadur Chettri	51,501	50.89	
CPI(M)	Kamala Sanskrityayana	26,034	25.72	
ABGL	Madan Kumar Rai (Bantawa)	18,503	18.28	
BJP	Prahlad Prasad Gupta	2,602	2.57	
AIIC(T)	Raja Rai	1,181	1.17	
IND	Pramod Tamang	680	0.67	
IND	Bhutia Pema Tshering Lama	386	0.38	
IUML	Ahmad Mansur	316	0.31	
Majority		25,467	25.17	
Turnout		106,573	69.93	
Swing to GNLF from Independent		Swing		

=== 1991 ===
1991 West Bengal Legislative Assembly election: Darjeeling
Party	Candidate	Votes	%	±%
IND	Narendra Kumai	47,722	54.51	
ABGL	J. D. S. Rai	35,489	40.54	
BJP	D. P. Chhetri	2,592	2.96	
IND	Surja Narayan Pradhan	1,743	1.99	
Majority		12,233	13.97	
Turnout		102,451	69.61	
Swing to Independent from CPI(M)		Swing		

=== 1987 ===
1987 West Bengal Legislative Assembly election: Darjeeling (Note: The 1987 West Bengal state elections coincided with the height of the violent Gorkhaland statehood agitation in the Darjeeling hills. The Gorkha National Liberation Front (GNLF) called for a massive, strictly enforced boycott of the election. Consequently, the vast majority of the electorate stayed home, dropping the turnout to 13.23%. Because the GNLF and its supporters boycotted rather than fielding a candidate, the few voters who did show up at the polls were predominantly CPI(M) loyalists, which allowed Dawa Lama to capture nearly 91% of the meager vote count.)
Party	Candidate	Votes	%	±%
CPI(M)	Dawa Lama	13,897	90.88	
INC	P. P. Rai	1,104	7.22	
IND	Diamond Muthey	175	1.14	
IND	Rajgopal Bhandari	88	0.58	
IND	Kishor Guruna	27	0.18	
Majority		12,793	83.66	
Turnout		15,843	13.23	
CPI(M) hold		Swing		

=== 1982 ===
1982 West Bengal Legislative Assembly election: Darjeeling
Party	Candidate	Votes	%	±%
CPI(M)	Dawa Lama	29,165	50.27	
IND	J. D. S. Rai	28,856	49.73	
Majority		309	0.54	
Turnout		60,012	59.40	
Swing to CPI(M) from Independent		Swing		

=== 1977 ===
1977 West Bengal Legislative Assembly election: Darjeeling
Party	Candidate	Votes	%	±%
IND	Deo Prakash Rai	12,607	31.75	
CPI(M)	Sangdopal Lepcha	8,414	21.19	
IND	Madan Kumar Thapa	5,311	13.38	
INC	P. P. Rai	5,235	13.18	
JP	Khaling Nirmal Chandra	4,876	12.28	
IND	Nandalal Gurung	1,952	4.92	
IND	Dalbahadur Singh Gahatraj	590	1.49	
ABGL	Santosh Kumar Gurung	383	0.96	
IND	Subhash Ghising	269	0.68	
IND	Madan Kumar Rai	68	0.17	
Majority		4,193	10.56	
Turnout		40,951	44.87	
Swing to Independent from ABGL		Swing		

=== 1972 ===
1972 West Bengal Legislative Assembly election: Darjeeling
Party	Candidate	Votes	%	±%
ABGL	Deo Prakash Rai	14,933	45.34	
IND	G. S. Gurung	9,476	28.77	
INC	P. P. Rai	7,331	22.26	
IND	Thakur Prasad	789	2.40	
IND	Guman Singh Chamling	403	1.22	
Majority		5,457	16.57	
Turnout		34,141	52.60	
ABGL hold		Swing		

=== 1971 ===
1971 West Bengal Legislative Assembly election: Darjeeling
Party	Candidate	Votes	%	±%
ABGL	Deo Prakash Rai	14,998	46.62	
INC	Madan Kumar Thapa	9,133	28.39	
CPI(M)	Rajendra Kumar Sinha	8,042	25.00	
Majority		5,865	18.23	
Turnout		33,745	53.42	
ABGL hold		Swing		

=== 1969 ===
1969 West Bengal Legislative Assembly election: Darjeeling
Party	Candidate	Votes	%	±%
ABGL	Deo Prakash Rai	15,698	57.68	
INC	Madan Kumar Thapa	11,519	42.32	
Majority		4,179	15.36	
Turnout		28,321	50.01	
Swing to ABGL from Independent		Swing		

=== 1967 ===
1967 West Bengal Legislative Assembly election: Darjeeling
Party	Candidate	Votes	%	±%
IND	D. Rai	14,281	51.03	
INC	M. K. Thapa	9,085	32.46	
IND	G. L. Subba	4,621	16.51	
Majority		5,196	18.57	
Turnout		29,373	54.32	
Swing to Independent from ABGL		Swing		

=== 1962 ===
1962 West Bengal Legislative Assembly election: Darjeeling
Party	Candidate	Votes	%	±%
ABGL	Deo Prakash Rai	9,139	49.17	
CPI	Ananda Prasad Pathak	4,619	24.85	
INC	D. Yonjan	3,413	18.36	
IND	Jatig Chandra Rai	1,183	6.36	
PSP	Tarak Kumar Kashi	234	1.26	
Majority		4,520	24.32	
Turnout		19,437	36.24	
Swing to ABGL from Independent		Swing		

=== 1957 ===
1957 West Bengal Legislative Assembly election: Darjeeling
Party	Candidate	Votes	%	±%
IND	Deo Prakash Rai	4,400	33.30	
CPI	Ananda Prasad	4,256	32.21	
INC	Dalbahadur Singh Gahatraj	2,836	21.47	
IND	Mahananda Subba	773	5.85	
IND	P. P. Pradhan	544	4.12	
IND	Debahadur	403	3.05	
Majority		144	1.09	
Turnout		13,212	33.35	
Independent hold		Swing		

=== 1951 ===
1951 West Bengal Legislative Assembly election: Darjeeling
Party	Candidate	Votes	%	±%
IND	Dalbahadur Singh Gahatraj	7,141	48.05	
INC	T. Mansen	3,872	26.05	
CPI	Ratanlal Brahman	3,849	25.90	
Majority		3,269	22.00	
Turnout		14,862	36.20	
Independent win (new seat)				
