= BGJ =

BGJ may refer to:

- Bangolan language, ISO 639-3 code 'bgj'
- Bharatiya Gorkha Janashakti, a political party in West Bengal, India
- First Bulgarian lev, ISO 4217 code 'BGJ'
