= Durga Malla =

Indian freedom fighter

Dūrgā Malla
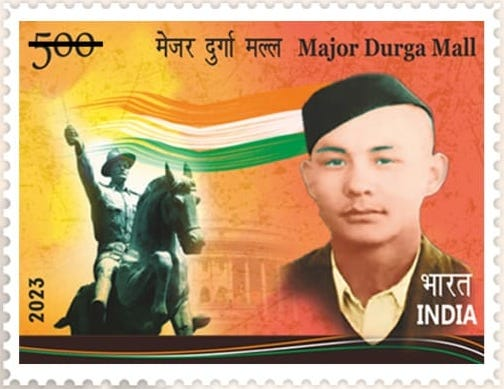
- Malla on a 2023 stamp of India
- Born: 1 July 1913; Dehradun, British India
- Died: 25 August 1944 (aged 31); Delhi, British India
- Cause of death: Execution by hanging
- Occupation: Indian Freedom Fighter (Army)
- Known for: Prominent activist in, and martyr for, the Indian independence movement; reorganizing aspects of the Indian National Army
- Title: Major of Azad Hind; Indian National Army
- Spouse: Sharda Devi
- Mother: Parwati Devi Chettri

Major Dūrgā Malla (1 July 1913 – 25 August 1944) was the first Gorkha soldier of the Indian Gorkhas in Indian National Army (INA) to sacrifice his life to the cause of Indian independence. Malla belonged to Thakuri community of the Gorkhas.

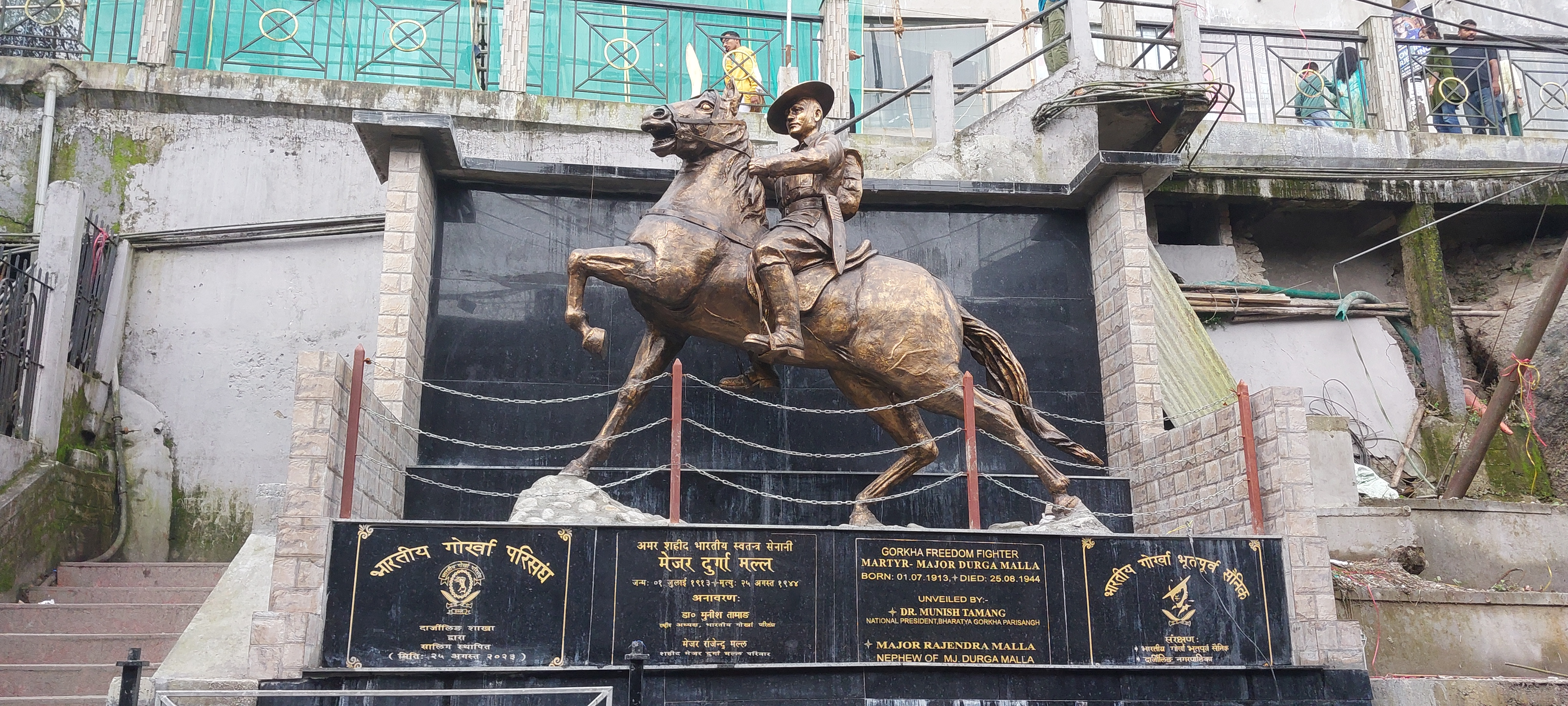
Statue of Durga Malla in front of the Darjeeling Municipality

== Early life ==
Malla was born in July 1913 at Doiwala near Dehradun, into a Chhetri family of Indian Gorkhas. He was the eldest son of Nb Sub Ganga Ram Malla. In 1930, when Mahatma Gandhi was leading the countrymen to march for independence through Dandi March, Malla was a student in class nine. He caught attention for his public statements against the British. In 1931, at age 18 years, he moved to Dharamshala and enrolled in 2/1 Gorkha Rifles. His patriotism brought him close to the Indian National Army of Netaji Subhas Chandra Bose.

== Contribution ==
In 1942, Malla joined INA. His skills and devotion to duty elevated him to the rank of Major and he was asked to work in INA intelligence. Whilst he was collecting information about the enemy, he was captured at Kohima on 27 March 1944. He was sentenced to death by the Court of Trial at Red Fort, New Delhi. However, before the death sentence was to be executed, the authorities tried to coerce him into admitting to sedition. His wife was brought to the prison cell, but Malla did not succumb to the pressure.

"The sacrifice I am offering shall not go in vain. India will be free. I am confident. This is only a matter of time, Sharda! Don’t worry, crores of Hindustanis are with you," Malla told his wife. Those were his last words to his wife.

== Personal life ==
Malla married Sharda devi chhetri of Shyam Nagar, Dharamshala in Himachal Pradesh in 1941. Three days after the ceremony, Malla was recalled to his headquarters and directed to go abroad. He next met his wife just before his execution at Delhi District Jail. In 1944, Major Durga Malla was sent to the gallows.

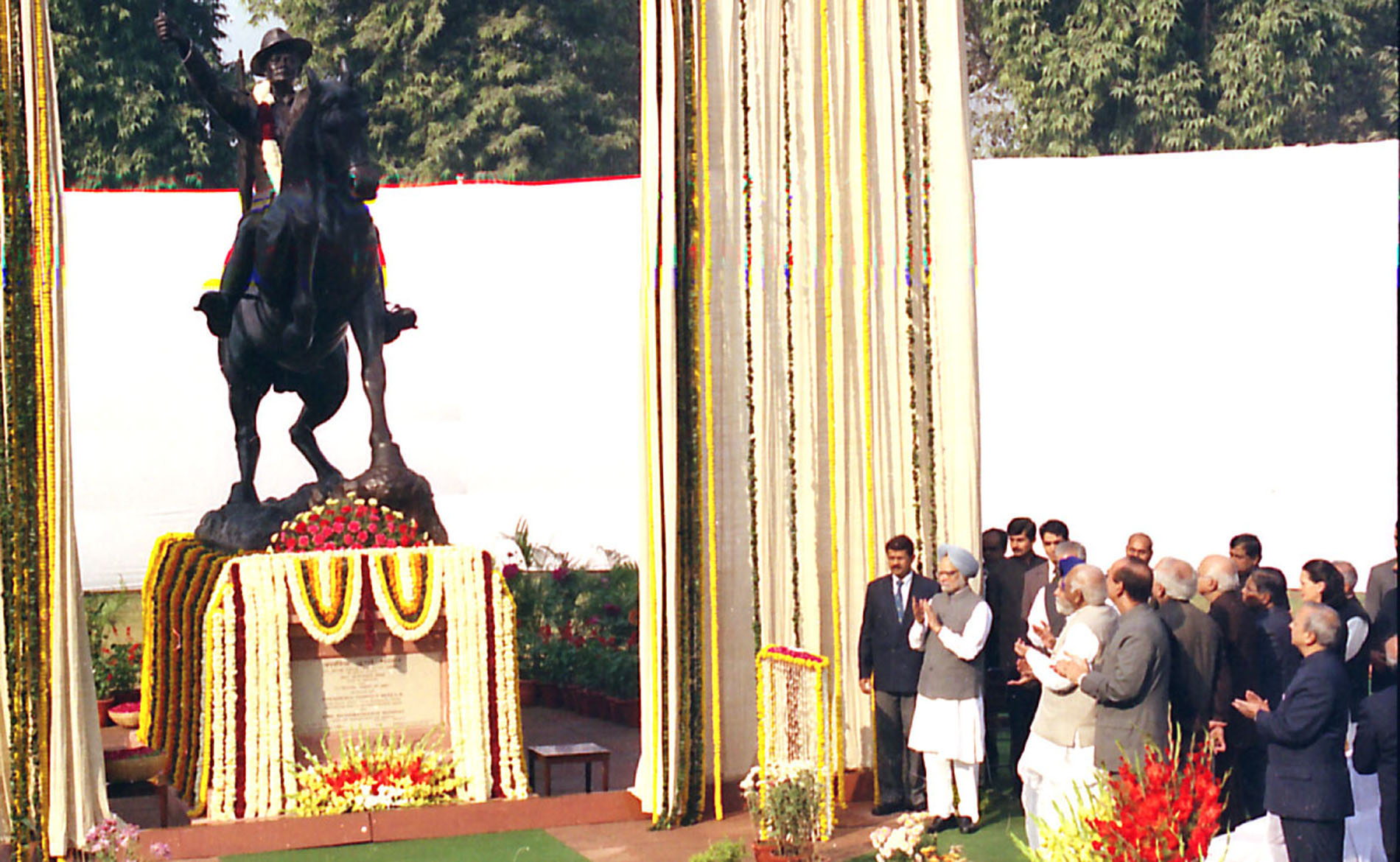
The Prime Minister Manmohan Singh at the unveiling of the statue of Shaheed Durga Malla in New Delhi on 17 December 2004

To honour Malla, a statue donated by Bharatiya Gorkha Parisangh, a national body of Indian Gorkhas, was unveiled at the Parliament House Complex by Prime Minister Manmohan Singh in 2004. Vice President Bhairon Singh Shekhawat, Lok Sabha Speaker Somnath Chatterjee and other dignitaries were present. 25 August, the day of his hanging, is observed as Balidan Diwas, or Martyrs' Day, by Gorkhas across India. Statue of Malla were erected at Garidhura village in Darjeeling district and in front of Darjeeling Municipality.
