= Kalimpong Assembly constituency =

Constituency of the West Bengal legislative assembly in India

Kalimpong
- Constituency No. 22 for the West Bengal Legislative Assembly
- Interactive Map Outlining Kalimpong Assembly Constituency

Constituency details
- Country: India
- Region: East India
- State: West Bengal
- District: Kalimpong
- Lok Sabha constituency: Darjeeling
- Established: 1951
- Total electors: 203,506
- Reservation: None

Member of Legislative Assembly
- 18th West Bengal Legislative Assembly
- Incumbent Bharat Kumar Chettri
- Party: Bharatiya Janata Party
- Elected year: 2026

Most Successful parties from Kalimpong assembly
1. Akhil Bharatiya Gorkha League (5 times) (27.9%)
2. Gorkha National Liberation Front (4 times) (22.3%)
3. Communist Party of India (2 times) (11.1%)
4. Indian National Congress (2 times) (11.1%)
5. Gorkha Janmukti Morcha (2 times) (11.1%)
6. Independent (1 time) (5.50%)
7. Bharatiya Gorkha Prajatantrik Morcha (1 time) (5.50%)
8. Bharatiya Janata Party (1 time) (5.50%)

Kalimpong Assembly constituency is only assembly constituency in Kalimpong district in the Indian state of West Bengal.

== Overview ==
As per orders of the Delimitation Commission, No. 22 Kalimpong Assembly constituency covers Kalimpong municipality, Kalimpong I community development block, Kalimpong II community development block, and Gorubathan community development block.

Kalimpong Assembly constituency is part of No. 4 Darjeeling (Lok Sabha constituency).

== Members of the Legislative Assembly ==
Year	Name	Party
1952	Lalit Bahadur Kharga	Communist Party of India
1957	Nar Bahadur Gurung	Independent politician
1962	Lakshmi Ranjan Josse	Akhil Bharatiya Gorkha League
1967	K.B. Gurung	Indian National Congress
1969	P.L. Subba	Akhil Bharatiya Gorkha League
1971	Madan Kumar Subba	Akhil Bharatiya Gorkha League
1972	Gajendra Gurung	Indian National Congress
1977	Renu Leena Subba	Akhil Bharatiya Gorkha League
1982	Renu Leena Subba	Akhil Bharatiya Gorkha League
1987	Mohan Singh Rai	Communist Party of India
1991	Nima Tsering Moktan	Gorkha National Liberation Front
1996	Gaulan Lepcha	Gorkha National Liberation Front
2001	Gaulan Lepcha	Gorkha National Liberation Front
2006	Gaulan Lepcha	Gorkha National Liberation Front
2011	Harka Bahadur Chettri	Gorkha Janmukti Morcha
2016	Sarita Rai	Gorkha Janmukti Morcha
2021	Ruden Sada Lepcha	Bharatiya Gorkha Prajatantrik Morcha
2026	Bharat Kumar Chettri	Bharatiya Janata Party

== Election results ==
=== 2026 ===
In the 2026 West Bengal Legislative Assembly election, Bharat Kumar Chetri of BJP defeated his nearest rival Ruden Sada Lepcha of BGPM by 21,464 votes.

2026 West Bengal Legislative Assembly election: Kalimpong
Party	Candidate	Votes	%	±%
BJP	Bharat Kumar Chetri	84,290	49.74	▲14.65
BGPM	Ruden Sada Lepcha	62,826	37.07	New entry
IND	Bhernone Britto Lepcha	14,231	8.4	New entry
ABGL	Sisir Kumar Sharma	1,961	1.16	New entry
INC	Santa Kumar Pradhan	1,809	1.07	▼0.04
IND	Aldrin Lepcha	1,389	0.82	New entry
CPI(M)	Rita Thapa	911	0.54	New entry
NOTA	Nota	2,060	1.22	▼0.17
Majority		21,464	12.67	▲10.17
Turnout		169,477	83.28	▲10.2
Registered electors		203,506		▼3.96
BJP gain from BGPM		Swing	7.58	

=== 2021 ===
In the 2021 West Bengal Legislative Assembly election, Ruden Sada Lepcha of GJM (Binay faction) defeated his nearest rival Suva Pradhan of BJP.

2021 West Bengal Legislative Assembly election: Kalimpong
Party	Candidate	Votes	%	±%
Independent	Ruden Sada Lepcha	58,206	37.59	
BJP	Suva Pradhan	54,336	35.09	
Independent	Dr. R.B. Bhujel	31,856	20.57	
National People's Party	Penjo Gompu Bhutia	1,805	1.17	
Independent	Songden Lepcha	1,720	1.11	
INC	Dilip Pradhan	1,715	1.11	
Independent	Ujjwal Rai	1,562	1.01	
Independent	Bhupendra Lepcha	1,503	0.97	
NOTA	None of the above	2,160	1.39	
Majority		3,870	2.5	
Turnout		154,863	73.08	
Independent gain from GJM		Swing		

=== 2016 ===
In the 2016 West Bengal Legislative Assembly election, Sarita Rai of GJM defeated her nearest rival Harka Bahadur Chhetri of JAP.

2016 West Bengal Legislative Assembly election: Kalimpong constituency
Party	Candidate	Votes	%	±%
GJM	Sarita Rai	67,693	49.05	
JAP	Harka Bahadur Chhetri	56,262	40.77	
CPRM	Kishore Pradhan	5,714	4.14	
GRC	Amar Lucksom	3,201	2.32	
Independent	Bhrigu Nath Gupta	1,751	1.26	
None of the Above	None of the Above	3,364	2.43	
Majority		11,431	8.28	
Turnout		1,37,985	71.22	
GJM hold		Swing		

=== 2011 ===
In the 2011 West Bengal Legislative Assembly election, Harka Bahadur Chhetri of GJM defeated his nearest rival Prakash Dahal of GNLF.

2011 West Bengal Legislative Assembly election: Kalimpong constituency
Party	Candidate	Votes	%	±%
GJM	Harka Bahadur Chettri	109,102	87.36	
GNLF	Prakash Dahal	7,427	5.94	
INC	Shanti Kumar Sharma	3,399	2.72	
CPI	Bikram Chhetri	3,105	2.48	
ABGL	Tribhuwan Rai	1,852	1.48	
Majority		1,01,675	81.42	
Turnout		1,24,885	75.06	
GJM gain from GNLF		Swing		

=== 2006 ===
2006 West Bengal Legislative Assembly election: Kalimpong
Party	Candidate	Votes	%	±%
GNLF	Gaulan Lepcha	57,647	56.12	
Independent	Norden Lama	31,845	31.00	
CPI	Nilay Rai	5,564	5.42	
Independent	Kalyan Kumar Dewan	5,016	4.88	
BSP	Major S. R. Bhutia	2,214	2.16	
Majority		25,802	25.12	
Turnout		102,723		
GNLF hold		Swing		

=== 2001 ===
2001 West Bengal Legislative Assembly election: Kalimpong
Party	Candidate	Votes	%	±%
GNLF	Goulan Lepcha	51,983	57.67	
Independent	Norden Lama	26,979	29.93	
CPI	Mohan Singh Rai (Dukhun)	6,380	7.08	
BJP	Chater Leslie John	4,803	5.33	
Majority		25,004	27.74	
Turnout		90,154	59.55	
GNLF hold		Swing		

=== 1996 ===
1996 West Bengal Legislative Assembly election: Kalimpong
Party	Candidate	Votes	%	±%
GNLF	Gaulan Lepcha	50,362	55.13	
ABGL	Norden Lama	17,121	18.74	
Independent	N. T. Moktan	9,683	10.60	
CPI	Mohan Singh Rai	8,242	9.02	
BJP	Puran Lohar	2,114	2.31	
Independent	Suren Khati	1,497	1.64	
Independent	Leslie John Chater	905	0.99	
Independent	Benoy Khati	512	0.56	
Independent	Ashok Rai	386	0.42	
Independent	Garjaman Singh Cintury	314	0.34	
Independent	Pasang Sada	211	0.23	
Majority		33,241	36.39	
Turnout		100,355	72.01	
Swing to GNLF from Independent		Swing		

=== 1991 ===
1991 West Bengal Legislative Assembly election: Kalimpong
Party	Candidate	Votes	%	±%
Independent	Nima Tshering Moktan	48,332	59.38	
CPI	Mohan Singh Rai (Dukhun)	16,406	20.16	
BJP	Udai Prakash Rai	8,418	10.34	
Independent	Leslie John Chater	3,886	4.77	
Independent	C. B. Rana	2,030	2.49	
Independent	R. B. Khatiwara	1,454	1.79	
Independent	S. R. Bhutia	468	0.57	
Independent	R. K. Suman	401	0.49	
Majority		31,926	39.22	
Turnout		85,956	66.97	
Swing to Independent from CPI		Swing		

=== 1987 ===
1987 West Bengal Legislative Assembly election: Kalimpong
Party	Candidate	Votes	%	±%
CPI	Mohansing Rai	964	91.63	
INC	Tashi Tshering Lepcha	77	7.32	
Independent	Bhim Kumar Rai	11	1.05	
Majority		887	84.31	
Turnout		1,100	1.05	
Swing to CPI from Independent		Swing		

=== 1982 ===
1982 West Bengal Legislative Assembly election: Kalimpong
Party	Candidate	Votes	%	±%
Independent	Renu Leena Subba	15,154	53.13	
Independent	Badrinayaran Pradhan	5,960	20.90	
CPI	Mohan Singh Rai	5,344	18.74	
Independent	Tashi Tshering Lepcha	1,587	5.56	
Independent	Ran Bahadur Khatiwara	478	1.68	
Majority		9,194	32.23	
Turnout		29,762	33.72	
Independent hold		Swing		

=== 1977 ===
1977 West Bengal Legislative Assembly election: Kalimpong
Party	Candidate	Votes	%	±%
Independent	Subha Renuleena	13,983	42.68	
INC	Gurung Gajendra	9,045	27.61	
JP	Pradhan Santosh	4,746	14.49	
CPI(M)	Ramshankar Prasad	4,567	13.94	
Independent	Khagendra Songpangbay	418	1.28	
Majority		4,938	15.07	
Turnout		33,646	47.54	
Swing to Independent from INC		Swing		

=== 1972 ===
1972 West Bengal Legislative Assembly election: Kalimpong
Party	Candidate	Votes	%	±%
INC	Gajendra Gurung	10,190	37.60	
ABGL	Prithiwinath Dikshit	8,806	32.49	
Independent	Madan Kumar Pradhan	4,782	17.64	
CPI(M)	Ramashanker Prasad	3,325	12.27	
Majority		1,384	5.11	
Turnout		28,073	43.89	
Swing to INC from ABGL		Swing		

=== 1971 ===
1971 West Bengal Legislative Assembly election: Kalimpong
Party	Candidate	Votes	%	±%
ABGL	Madan Kumar Prodhan	10,810	38.09	
Independent	Padma Lakshmi Subba	7,388	26.04	
INC	Sonam Wangdi Rhotia	4,841	17.06	
CPI(M)	Rama Shankar Prosad	4,718	16.63	
Independent	Basant Kumar Dahal	620	2.18	
Majority		3,422	12.05	
Turnout		29,747	47.83	
ABGL hold		Swing		

=== 1969 ===
1969 West Bengal Legislative Assembly election: Kalimpong
Party	Candidate	Votes	%	±%
ABGL	P. L. Subba	15,418	55.13	
INC	K. B. Gurung	11,120	39.76	
ABJS	D. P. Kumai	803	2.87	
Independent	Thakur Prasad	628	2.25	
Majority		4,298	15.37	
Turnout		28,920	50.43	
Swing to ABGL from INC		Swing		

=== 1967 ===
1967 West Bengal Legislative Assembly election: Kalimpong
Party	Candidate	Votes	%	±%
INC	K. B. Gurung	15,023	50.66	
Independent	R. Dahal	11,985	40.42	
CPI	B. B. Hamal	1,470	4.96	
ABJS	T. Prasad	1,174	3.96	
Majority		3,038	10.24	
Turnout		30,886	55.40	
Swing to INC from ABGL		Swing		

=== 1962 ===
1962 West Bengal Legislative Assembly election: Kalimpong
Party	Candidate	Votes	%	±%
ABGL	Lakshmi Ranjan Josse	12,809	52.94	
INC	Narbahadur Gurung	7,942	32.82	
CPI	Krishnabhakta Sharma	2,085	8.62	
Independent	Thakur Prasad	711	2.94	
PSP	Frederich Moqueton	326	1.35	
Independent	Kulbahadur Khati	168	0.69	
Independent	Duryodhan Rai	103	0.43	
Independent	Bhishnulal Singh	52	0.21	
Majority		4,867	20.12	
Turnout		25,179	42.88	
Swing to ABGL from Independent		Swing		

=== 1957 ===
1957 West Bengal Legislative Assembly election: Kalimpong
Party	Candidate	Votes	%	±%
Independent	Narbahadur Gurung	6,137	49.10	
Independent	M. K. Pradhan	4,196	33.57	
PSP	Durjadhan Rai	1,327	10.62	
Independent	Lalit Bahadur Kharga	620	4.96	
Independent	Thakur Prasad	220	1.76	
Majority		1,941	15.53	
Turnout		12,500	28.26	
Swing to Independent from CPI		Swing		

=== 1951 ===
1951 West Bengal Legislative Assembly election: Kalimpong
Party	Candidate	Votes	%	±%
CPI	Lalit Bahadur Kharga	7,422	59.87	
INC	Gajendra Sinha Bhandari	4,975	40.13	
Majority		2,447	19.74	
Turnout		12,397	29.37	
CPI win (new seat)				
