= Ruden Sada Lepcha =

Indian politician

Member of the West Bengal Legislative Assembly
- In office 2 May 2021 – 4 May 2026
- Preceded by: Sarita Rai
- Succeeded by: Bharat Chettri
- Constituency: Kalimpong

Personal details
- Party: Bharatiya Gorkha Prajatantrik Morcha (2021–Present)
- Other political affiliations: Gorkha Janmukti Morcha (Tamang) (till 2021)
- Education: Bachelor of Arts from Kalimpong College
- Profession: Politician

Ruden Sada Lepcha is an Indian politician from Bharatiya Gorkha Prajatantrik Morcha. In May 2021, he was elected as a member of the West Bengal Legislative Assembly from Kalimpong (constituency) as a candidate of Gorkha Janmukti Morcha (Tamang). He defeated Suva Pradhan of Bharatiya Janata Party by 3,870 votes in 2021 West Bengal Assembly Elections.

== Criminal Records ==
He is an accused in a number of criminal cases, including criminal intimidation and kidnapping with intent to murder. However, he hasn't been convicted in any form so far.
