= Theodore Manaen =

Indian politician (1922–2020)

Member of Parliament, Lok Sabha
- In office 1957-1967
- Succeeded by: Maitreyee Bose
- Constituency: Darjeeling, West Bengal

Personal details
- Born: 6 June 1922 Kurseong, Darjeeling district, Bengal Presidency, British India
- Died: 6 April 2020 Pradhan Nagar, Siliguri
- Party: Indian National Congress
- Other political affiliations: Gorkha League
- Spouse: Aruna

Theodore Manaen (1922-2020) was an Indian politician. He was the 1st Gorkha to be chosen as the General Secretary of the All India Congress Committee under Nehru's regime. He was twice elected to the Lok Sabha, lower house of the Parliament of India from Darjeeling, West Bengal; The 1st time as a member of the Gorkha League and the 2nd time as a member of the Indian National Congress.
