= Ananda Pathak =

Indian politician

Member of Parliament, Lok Sabha
- In office 1980-1989
- Preceded by: Krishna Bahadur Chhetri
- Succeeded by: Inderjeet
- In office 1998-1999
- Preceded by: Ratna Bahadur Rai
- Succeeded by: S. P. Lepcha
- Constituency: Darjeeling, West Bengal

Member of Parliament, Rajya Sabha
- In office 1977-1980
- Constituency: West Bengal

Member of Legislative Assembly
- In office 1971-1972
- Preceded by: Nanda Lal Gurung
- Succeeded by: Nanda Lal Gurung
- Constituency: Jorebungalow

Personal details
- Born: 15 January 1930 Haridas Hatta, Darjeeling, Bengal Presidency, British India
- Died: December 2014 (aged 84)
- Party: Communist Party of India (Marxist)
- Spouse: Soumati Pathak (m. 1964)
- Children: 2

Ananda Pathak was an Indian politician. He was elected to the Lok Sabha, the lower house of the Parliament of India from Darjeeling, West Bengal as a member of the Communist Party of India (Marxist). Earlier he was a member of the upper house of the Parliament of India, the Rajya Sabha and West Bengal Legislative Assembly.

== Personal life ==
Pathak was born to Kamala Kanta Pathak in Haridas Hatta in Darjeeling district, Bengal Presidency of British India. He married Soumati Pathak in June 1964, with whom he had two sons. He died in December 2014.

== Political career ==
=== Lok Sabha ===
Year	Constituency	Party	Votes	%	Opponent	Party	Votes	%	Result	Margin	%
1998	Darjeeling	CPI(M)	2,80,589	44.75	Prasanta Nandy	INC	1,58,033	25.21	Won	+1,22,556	+19.54
1991	Darjeeling	CPI(M)	3,02,748	41.04	Inder Jeet	INC	3,54,645	48.07	Lost	-51,897	-7.03
1989	Darjeeling	CPI(M)	2,89,965	37.65	Inderjeet	GNLF	4,35,070	56.49	Lost	-1,45,105	-18.84
1984	Darjeeling	CPI(M)	2,28,679	41.96	Dawa Narbula	INC	2,27,290	41.71	Won	+1,389	+0.25
1980	Darjeeling	CPI(M)	1,85,612	45.75	K. B. Chettri	INC(I)	1,67,451	41.27	Won	+18,161	+4.48

=== Rajya Sabha ===
Position	Party	Constituency	From	To	Tenure
Member of Parliament, Rajya Sabha (1st Term)	CPI(M)	West Bengal	13 July 1977	2 April 1978	263 days
Member of Parliament, Rajya Sabha (2nd Term)	CPI(M)	West Bengal	3 April 1978	9 January 1980	1 year, 281 days
