= Damber Singh Gurung =

Indian politician

Members of the Constituent Assembly
- In office November 1946 – 7 April 1948
- Constituency: Bengal Province

Personal details
- Born: 23 January 1900 Kalimpong, West Bengal
- Died: 7 April 1948 (aged 48)
- Party: Akhil Bharatiya Gorkha League

Damber Singh Gurung (23 January 1900 – 7 April 1948) was an Indian politician, lawyer and social worker. He founded the Akhil Bharatiya Gorkha League, a political party, in 1943. Born in Kalimpong, West Bengal, Gurung represented the Indian Gorkha community in the Constituent Assembly of India till his death in 1948, after which Ari Bahadur Gurung took his place.
