= Krishna Bahadur Chhetri =

Indian politician

Member of Parliament, Lok Sabha
- In office 1977-80
- Preceded by: Ratanlal Brahmin
- Succeeded by: Ananda Pathak
- Constituency: Darjeeling, West Bengal

Personal details
- Born: 15 October 1935 Dilaram, Bengal Presidency, British India
- Party: Indian National Congress

Krishna Bahadur Chhetri was an Indian politician. He was elected to the Lok Sabha, lower house of the Parliament of India from Darjeeling, West Bengal as a member of the Indian National Congress.
