= Harka Bahadur Chhetri =

Indian politician

Member of the West Bengal Legislative Assembly
- In office 2011–2016
- Preceded by: Gaulan Lepcha
- Succeeded by: Sarita Rai
- Constituency: Kalimpong

Personal details
- Party: Gorkha Janmukti Morcha
- Education: University of North Bengal (Ph.D)
- Profession: Politician, Teacher

Harka Bahadur Chhetri is an Indian politician from West Bengal. He was elected as a Member of the Legislative Assembly in 2011 West Bengal Legislative Assembly election from Kalimpong, as a member of the Gorkha Janmukti Morcha.
