= Neeraj Zimba =

Indian politician

Neeraj Zimba Tamang

Member of the West Bengal Legislative Assembly
- In office 23 May 2019 – 4 May 2026
- Preceded by: Amar Singh Rai
- Succeeded by: Noman Rai
- Constituency: Darjeeling

Personal details
- Party: Gorkha National Liberation Front

Neeraj Zimba Tamang (14 November 1981) is an Indian Gorkha politician. He is the Central Committee Member and presently Secretary General and Legal Adviser of Gorkha National Liberation Front (GNLF). He was GNLF Spokesperson till 2019. He is also a practicing Criminal Lawyer by profession. He serves as an MLA in the West Bengal Legislative Assembly from the 23-Darjeeling Assembly constituency after winning on a Bharatiya Janta Party [BJP] ticket in 2019 by polls.

== Early life and education ==
He was born to Tekdhoj Tamang Zimba and hails from Darjeeling, West Bengal, India. He obtained his master's degree (M.A.) in political science from Annamalai University in 2012 and also holds a Master of Law (LL.M.) from The Institute of Chartered Financial Analysts of India University. He is an advocate by profession.

== Political career ==
An ardent follower of Subash Ghising since his school days, he became the youngest Central Committee Member of the GNLF party and the youngest Indian Gorkha Member of Legislative Assembly (MLA) to represent his 23-Darjeeling Constituency in the West Bengal Legislative Assembly in 2019 at the age of 36. He became the party Spokesperson in 2016. His #RTI reports on Gorkhaland Issue and Tribal Status Issue have garnered public attention.

=== 2019 Assembly election ===
As of 2019, he is the Member of Legislative Assembly (MLA), representing 23-Darjeeling Assembly Constituency in West Bengal Legislative Assembly as a Bharatiya Janta Party [BJP] legislator. In May 2019, Neeraj Zimba, the BJP-GJM-Bimal Faction-backed GNLF candidate won the elections who polled 87,896 (61.8%) votes while Binoy Tamang, an Independent candidate backed by TMC stood second with 41611 (29.18%). Amar Lama of JAP came a distant third with 3233 (2.27%) votes. Zimba won by a margin of 46,538 votes.
