= Ratanlal Brahmin =

Indian politician (1900–1989)

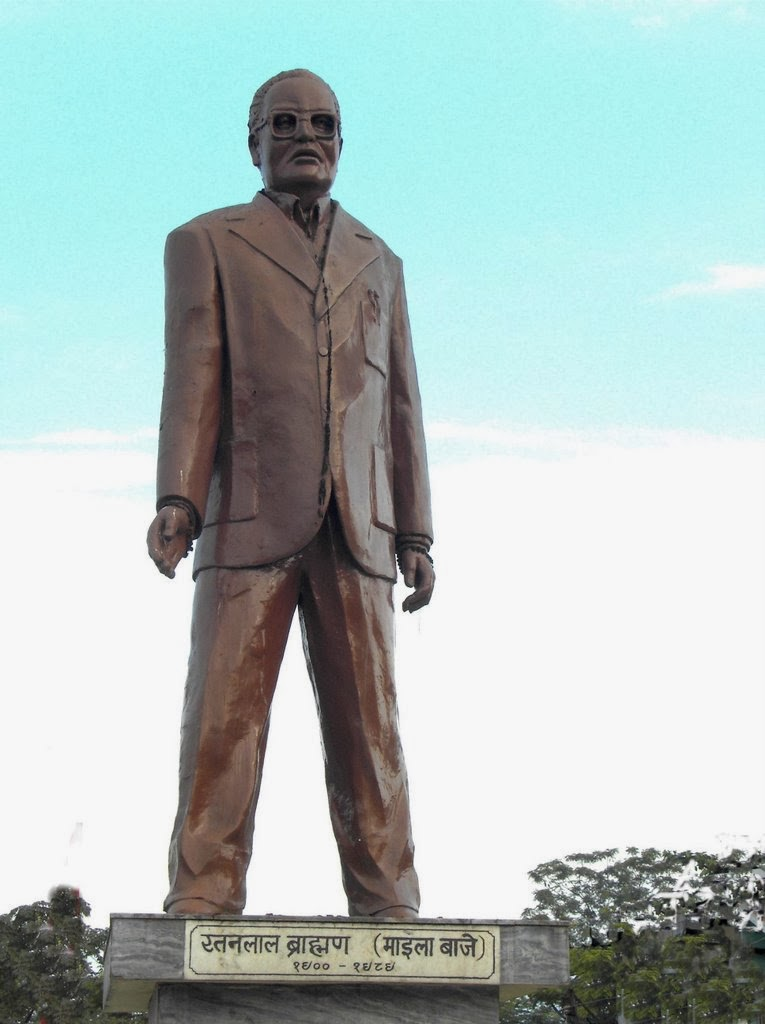
- Statue of Ratanalal Brahmin

Member of Parliament, Lok Sabha
- In office 1971-77
- Preceded by: Maitreyee Bose
- Succeeded by: Krishna Bahadur Chhetri
- Constituency: Darjeeling, West Bengal

Personal details
- Born: 16 August 1900 Darjeeling, Bengal Presidency, British India
- Died: January 4, 1989 (aged 88) Vijayawada, Andhra Pradesh
- Party: Communist Party of India (Marxist)
- Other political affiliations: Communist Party of India
- Spouse: Harimaya Chhatri
- Children: 9

Ratanlal Brahmin (1900–1989) was an Indian politician. He was elected to the Lok Sabha, lower house of the Parliament of India from Darjeeling, West Bengal as a member of the Communist Party of India (Marxist). He was earlier a member of the West Bengal Legislative Assembly as a member of the undivided Communist Party of India.
