= Chopra Assembly constituency =

Chopra
- Constituency No. 28 for the West Bengal Legislative Assembly
- Interactive Map Outlining Chopra Assembly Constituency

Constituency details
- Country: India
- Region: East India
- State: West Bengal
- District: Uttar Dinajpur
- Lok Sabha constituency: Darjeeling
- Established: 1977
- Total electors: 219,393
- Reservation: None

Member of Legislative Assembly
- 18th West Bengal Legislative Assembly
- Incumbent Hamidul Rahaman
- Party: Trinamool Congress
- Elected year: 2026

Most Successful parties from Chopra assembly
1. Communist Party of India (Marxist) (6 times) (54.5%)
2. All India Trinamool Congress (3 times) (27.3%)
3. Independent politician (2 times) (18.1%)

Chopra Assembly constituency is an assembly constituency in Uttar Dinajpur district in the Indian state of West Bengal.

== Overview ==
As per orders of the Delimitation Commission, No. 28 Chopra Assembly constituency covers Chopra community development block and Kamalagaon Sujali gram panchayat of Islampur community development block.

Chopra Assembly constituency is part of No. 4 Darjeeling (Lok Sabha constituency).

== Members of the Legislative Assembly ==
Year	Name	Party
1977	Bachcha Munsi	Communist Party of India (Marxist)
1982	Bachcha Munsi	Communist Party of India (Marxist)
1987	Mohammad Mahamuddin	Communist Party of India (Marxist)
1991	Mohammad Mahamuddin	Communist Party of India (Marxist)
1996	Mohammad Mahamuddin	Communist Party of India (Marxist)
2001	Hamidul Rahman	Independent
2006	Anwarul Haque	Communist Party of India (Marxist)
2011	Hamidul Rahaman	Independent
2016	Hamidul Rahaman	Trinamool Congress
2021	Hamidul Rahaman	Trinamool Congress
2026	Hamidul Rahaman	Trinamool Congress

== Election results ==
=== 2026 ===
In the 2026 West Bengal Legislative Assembly election, Hamidul Rahaman of TMC defeated his nearest rival Sankar Adhikari of BJP by 69124 votes.

2026 West Bengal Legislative Assembly election: Chopra
Party	Candidate	Votes	%	±%
AITC	Hamidul Rahaman	120,986	57.3	▼3.9
BJP	Sankar Adhikari	51,862	24.56	▼4.84
INC	Zakir Abedin	25,565	12.11	New entry
CPI(M)	Makleswar Rahaman	5,816	2.75	▼3.27
AJUP	Md Nazim Sarif	2,366	1.12	New entry
AMB	Ajoy Kumar Sinha	1,492	0.71	New entry
IND	Md Nasiruddin	1,250	0.59	New entry
IND	Md Parbeez Alam	601	0.28	New entry
NOTA	Nota	1,225	0.58	▼0.17
Majority		69,124	32.74	▲0.94
Turnout		211,163	96.25	▲13.87
Registered electors		219,393		▼11.45
AITC hold		Swing	0.47	

=== 2021 ===
In the 2021 West Bengal Legislative Assembly election, Hamidul Rahman of TMC defeated his nearest rival Md. Shahin Akhtar of BJP.

2021 West Bengal Legislative Assembly election: Chopra constituency
Party	Candidate	Votes	%	±%
AITC	Hamidul Rahaman	124,923	61.2	
BJP	Md. Shahin Akhtar	60,018	29.4	
CPI(M)	Anwarul Haque	12,279	6.02	
AMB	Ajoy Kumar Sinha	3,166	1.55	
Independent	Surojit Kisku	2,193	1.07	
NOTA	None of the above	1,531	0.75	
Majority		64,905	31.8	
Turnout		204,110	82.38	
AITC hold		Swing		

=== 2016 ===
In the 2016 West Bengal Legislative Assembly election, Hamidul Rahman of TMC defeated his nearest rival Akramul Haque of CPI(M).

2016 West Bengal Legislative Assembly election: Chopra constituency
Party	Candidate	Votes	%	±%
AITC	Hamidul Rahman	74,390	41.81	+36.99
CPI(M)	Akramul Haque	57,530	32.34	−7.72
BJP	Sajen Ram Singha	15,815	8.89	+4.87
Independent	Ashok Roy	15,618	8.78	
JDP	Sarkar Murmu	4,214	2.37	
GJM	Naseer Ahmed Khan	3,531	1.98	
Independent	Dr Md Tabibur Rahman	2,681	1.50	
BSP	Ruhidas Uraw	1,456	0.82	
NOTA	None of the Above	2,655	1.49	
Turnout		177,890		
AITC gain from Independent		Swing		

=== 2011 ===
In the 2011 election, Hamidul Rahman (Independent) defeated his nearest rival Anwarul Haque of CPI(M).

West Bengal assembly elections, 2011: Chopra constituency
Party	Candidate	Votes	%	±%
Independent	Hamidul Rahman	64,289	44.62	-0.78
CPI(M)	Anwarul Haque	57,719	40.06	−10.90
AITC	Sekh Jalaluddin	6,944	4.82	
BJP	Ashim Chandra Barman	5,793	4.02	
Independent	Ruhidas Urao	5,377	3.73	
Independent	Safiya Khatun	2,178	1.51	
BSP	Joydeb Biswas	178	0.12	
Majority		6,570	4.56	
Turnout		1,44,084	86.22	
Independent gain from CPI(M)		Swing		

Hamidul Rahman, contesting as an independent candidate, was a rebel Congress candidate from Chopra. He was suspended from the party but the Raiganj MP, Deepa Dasmunsi, campaigned for him. Of the 18 Congress rebels who fought the 2011 assembly elections, Hamidul Rahaman was the only one to win.

.# Change figure based on his own vote percentage as a Congress candidate in 2006.

=== 2006 ===
In the 2006 state assembly elections, Anwarul Haque of CPI(M) won the Chopra assembly seat defeating his nearest rival Hamidul Rahman of Congress. Contests in most years were multi cornered but only winners and runners are being mentioned. Hamidul Rahaman, Independent, defeated Akbar Ali of CPI(M) in 2001. Mahamuddin of CPI(M) defeated Hamidul Rahman of Congress in 1996, Choudhury Md. Manjur Afaque of Congress in 1991 and Shiekh Jalaluddin Ahmad of Congress in 1987. Mahammad Bacha Munshi of CPI(M) defeated Sheikh Jalauddin of Congress in 1982 and Narayan Chandra Sinha, Independent in 1977. Prior to that the constituency did not exist.
