= Surya Roshni =

Indian multinational manufacturer

Surya Roshni Limited
- Type: Public
- Traded as: NSE: SURYAROSNI; BSE: 500336
- ISIN: INE335A01012
- Industry: Consumer electronics
- Founded: 1973
- Founder: B.D. Agarwal
- Headquarters: Delhi, India
- Area served: Worldwide
- Key people: Jai Prakash Agarwal (Chairman); Vinay Surya (Managing Director); Raju Bista (Managing Director)
- Products: Fans, Water pumps, Lighting, Home appliances, Kitchen appliances, Steel products, PVC pipes
- Revenue: ▲₹8,002 crore (US$830 million) (FY23)
- Net income: ▲₹335 crore (US$35 million) (FY22)
- Website: www.surya.co.in

Surya Roshni Limited is an Indian electrical equipment company based in Delhi. The company has lighting and electrical consumer durables including LED lighting, fans, pumps, and household appliances. It also produces plumbing equipments like PVC pipes and steel.

== History ==
Surya Roshni Limited was established by B.D. Agarwal in 1973 as a tube making unit. Today it also manufactures LEDs, Lighting, PVC Fans. The company's current chairman is the Padma Shri awardee Jai Prakash Agarwal.

== Manufacturing plants ==
Surya Roshni's steel division is called Surya Steel Pipes with steel manufacturing plants in Bhuj (Gujarat), Gwalior (Madhya Pradesh) and its primary steel plant in Bahadurgarh, Haryana. It also has a pipes and lighting production facility at Shimoga, Karnataka. It started commercial production on 1 March 2017 at their new steel pipe plant with an investment of ₹70 crore at Hindupur industrial area, Andhra Pradesh. Surya's lighting plant is in Kashipur, Uttarakhand and Gwalior (Madhya Pradesh). Additionally, the company has set up a R&D centre for LED lights in Uttarakhand.
