= Raju Bista =

Indian politician (born 1986)

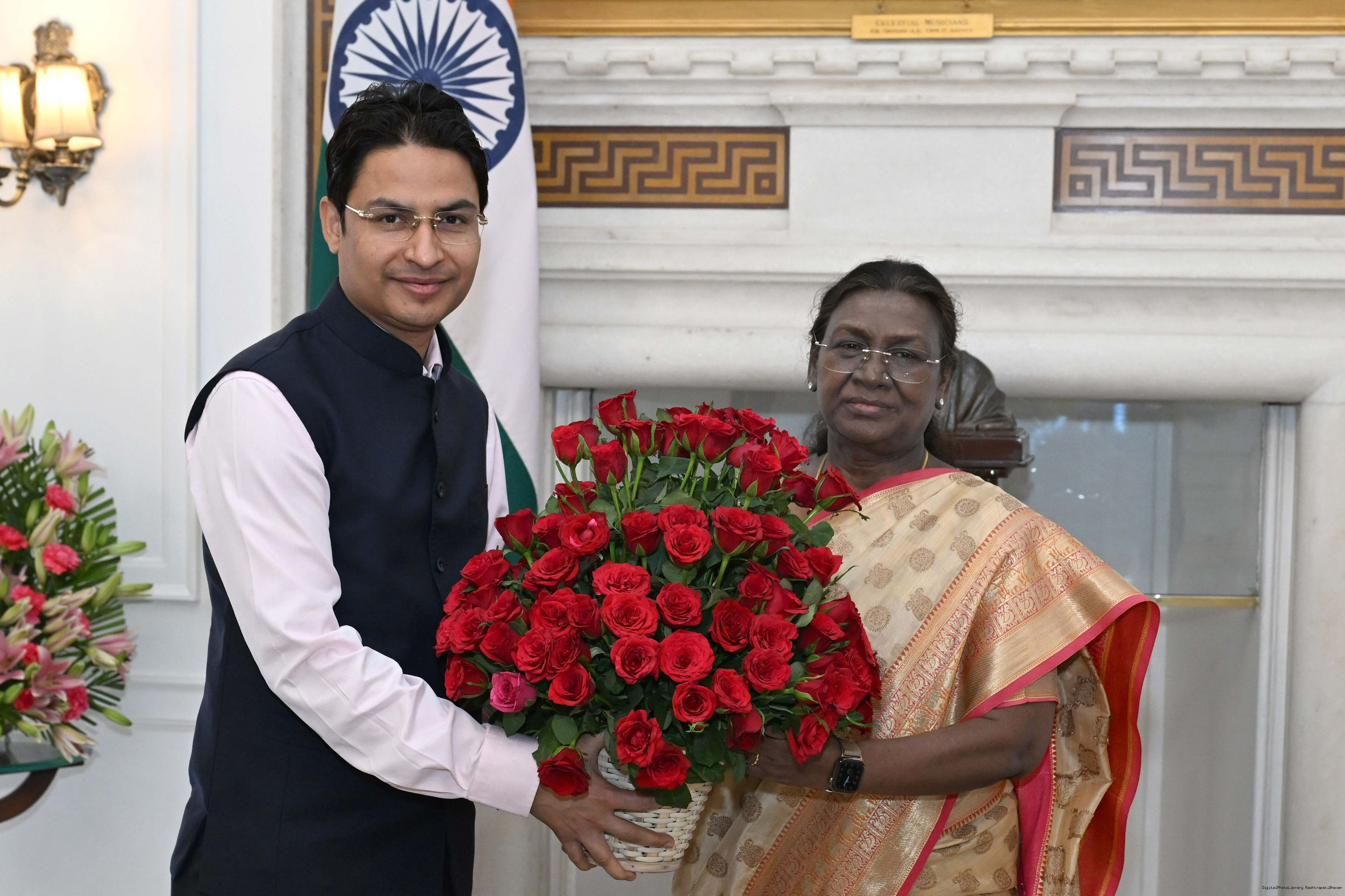
- Bista (left) with President of India, Droupadi Murmu (2025)

Member of Parliament, Lok Sabha
- Incumbent
- Assumed office 23 May 2019
- Preceded by: S. S. Ahluwalia
- Constituency: Darjeeling

Personal details
- Born: 3 January 1986 (age 40) Charhajare, Manipur, India
- Party: Bharatiya Janata Party
- Spouse: Anita Bista (m. 2006)
- Children: 3
- Education: Presidency College, Motbung (B.A.)
- Profession: Business, social work
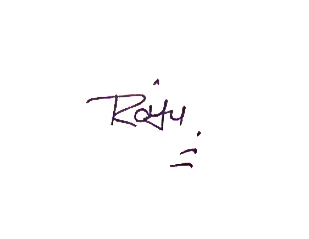
- Signature

Raju Bista (born 3 January 1986) is an Indian politician and managing director of Surya Roshni Limited. He was elected to the Lok Sabha, the lower house of the Parliament of India, from Darjeeling, West Bengal in the 2019 Indian general election as a member of the Bharatiya Janata Party. He is a National Spokesperson of the BJP. On 14 July 2021, he has been appointed as a National General Secretary of Bharatiya Janata Yuva Morcha.

== Personal life ==
Bista was born on 3 January 1986 in an Indian Gorkha family of Vishnu and Prabah Bista in Charhajare, Senapati district of Manipur. He is a Bachelor of Arts and was educated at Presidency College, Motbung which is affiliated to Manipur University. Bista married Anita Bista on 6 October 2006, with whom he has two daughters. He also serves as the managing director of Surya Roshni and is also involved with social work.

== Tea industry advocacy ==
In June 2026, Bista participated in a high-level tea industry meeting at Uttar Kanya in Siliguri alongside state and central representatives to address the revival of closed tea estates and welfare measures for tea workers in North Bengal. During the summit, he advocated for the implementation of the Prime Minister Tea Workers Welfare Scheme, stating that remaining funds from the allocated ₹1,000 crore package would be directed toward bolstering local healthcare services, education, and infrastructure development within the region's tea gardens. Bista opposed proposals converting tea plantation lands into commercial hotel projects, maintaining that such lands must remain dedicated to tea cultivation to safeguard the livelihoods of the local workforce.
