= Maitreyee Bose =

Indian politician

Member of Parliament, Lok Sabha
- In office 1967-71
- Preceded by: Theodore Manaen
- Succeeded by: Ratanlal Brahmin
- Constituency: Darjeeling, West Bengal

Personal details
- Born: 7 October 1905 Giridih District, Bengal Presidency, British India
- Party: Independent
- Other party: Indian National Congress
- Spouse: Swadesh Basu

Maitreyee Bose was an Indian politician. She was elected to the Lok Sabha, lower house of the Parliament of India, from Darjeeling, West Bengal as an independent. She was earlier a member of the West Bengal Legislative Assembly as a member of the Indian National Congress.

She was connected with the All India Trade Union Congress (1943–47) and joined the Indian National Trade Union Congress in 1948.
