= Moe Thee Zune =

Burmese activist (born 1962)

Moe Thee Zun
- မိုးသီးဇွန်
- Pronunciation: móθízù̃
- Born: Myo Than Htut; 1962 (age 63–64)
- Education: Rangoon University
- Occupations: Activist; Politician

Moe Thee Zun (Burmese: မိုးသီးဇွန်, IPA: [móθízù̃]) (born Myo Than Htut; in 1962), is a Burmese activist, politician and one of the leaders in the Burmese democratic movement.

== Biography ==
=== Early life ===
Zun is the founder of Burma's Democratic Party for a New Society. Moethee Zun is also the president and the founder of Democratic Federation of Burma, a democratic organization for the liberation and freedom movement in Burma.

As a Rangoon University student then, Zun helped organize the national wide student movement in 1988, and joined 1990 presidential election. After the Burmese military regime took back its power, Zun was forced to leave the country. During the time, he lost his family. He had been sentenced to life in prison in absentia by the military government.

=== Coming to the U.S. ===
Zun currently resides in the United States. He came to the U.S. under the U.S. government's protection in 2001. During the time, he has been leading Burmese activists to seek support from the international community and to make lobbying to promote the movement. His fellowship allowed him to complete a book documenting his history, called "The Struggle for Democracy in Burma". In 2004, he published his second book in the Burmese language titled "Compromising with the Burmese Generals".

=== Return and second exile ===
In 2012, he returned to Myanmar after spending 24 years in exile, following the removal of his name from a government blacklist.

Upon learning from local media that Moe Thee Zun had returned to Myanmar for political purposes, Htay Naing's mother initiated the lawsuit case at the North Dagon Police Station and also reported at the President's Office on September 12, 2012. In response, President Thein Sein directed the Rangoon Division Government to take criminal action against Moe Thee Zun and his accomplices. He then challenged the Myanmar government, stating that if he were to be charged, the government should also face charges for the massacres in 1962, 1970, 1988, and 2007 carried out by the former military government. Following the news conference, he swiftly boarded the first available flight out of Myanmar, managing to escape arrest by the police. He then fled back to New York City.

He was blacklisted, preventing entry into the country under any circumstance by the Ministry of Immigration and Population in June 2014.
