= Bachcha Munsi =

Indian politician

- বাচ্চা মুন্সি

Member of West Bengal Legislative Assembly
- In office 1977–1987
- Preceded by: Office created
- Succeeded by: Mohammad Mahamuddin
- Constituency: Chopra

Personal details
- Born: Velapukari, Maidandighi, Boda, Jalpaiguri District, Bengal Presidency, British India
- Died: 10 October 1987 Chopra, Paschim Dinajpur
- Party: Communist Party of India (Marxist)
- Occupation: Politician; Revolutionary; Communist Leader
- Indian independence movement

Bachcha Munsi (died 10 October 1987) was an Indian communist politician who belonged to Communist Party of India Marxist. He was a farmer leader of the Kisan Sabha and an influential figure in the Tebhaga movement in the Dinajpur district of undivided Bengal. He was elected to the West Bengal Legislative Assembly in 1977 and 1982.

== Freedom struggle and Tebhaga movement ==
His real name was Majitullah. Born in a poor peasant family, he later became involved in many groundbreaking movements. In 1939, in resistance to high interest rates on farm laborers in Dinajpur, present-day Bangladesh, he jumped into the militant movement with sharecroppers against moneylenders. He broke the stockpiles of landlords Debnath Saha and Triloikya Saha and distributed food among the afflicted people during the famine of 1942. Abdullah Rasul named him Bachcha Munsi to avoid the surveillance of the British, this is the name by which he is best known. In 1946, against the tyranny and oppression of the landlords and the Britishers the historic resistance of Tebhaga took place at Nilphamari in Rangpur district under the leadership of Bachcha Munsi and Narayan Barman. His ally Narayan Barman was martyred by the bullet of the zamindars. And as there was a death warrant in his name in East Pakistan, he fled to Chopra's Daspara. The Communist Party's first public meeting in Islampur area was held on 19 November 1956 at Dhanirhat, Chopra, where the red flag was hoisted for the first time and one of the initiators was Bachha Munsi. Then he continued to be involved in the Food Movement of 1959 like other famous activities. Bachcha Munshi was twice elected to the Chopra Assembly in 1977 and 1982. He died on 10 October 1987.

== Electoral history ==
Election Year	Constituency	won/lost	Votes Secured	%
1977	Chopra Assembly constituency	won	16188	42.37
1982	Chopra Assembly constituency	won	37279	51.98

== Legacy ==
The school, Bachcha Munshi Smriti Balika Vidyalay in Chopra, Uttar Dinajpur, is named after him.

The office of CPIM's Chopra Area Committee-1, the district office of SFI-DYFI at Raiganj Super Market and the district office of CPIM South Dinajpur at Balurghat are named Bachcha Munshi Bhavan.
