= Mohammad Mahamuddin =

Indian politician

West Bengal Legislative Assembly
- In office 1987–2001
- Preceded by: Bachcha Munsi
- Succeeded by: Hamidul Rahman
- Constituency: Chopra

Personal details
- Born: c. 1934
- Died: 13 November 2018 (aged 84)
- Party: Communist Party of India (Marxist)

Mohammad Mahamuddin (c. 1934 – 13 November 2018) was an Indian politician from West Bengal belonging to Communist Party of India (Marxist). He was elected thrice as a member of the West Bengal Legislative Assembly.

== Biography ==
Mahamuddin was elected as a member of the West Bengal Legislative Assembly from Chopra in 1987. He was also elected from that constituency in 1991 and 1996.

Mahamuddin died on 13 November 2018 at the age of 84.
