= Amar Singh Rai =

Indian politician

Member of West Bengal Legislative Assembly
- In office 2016–2019
- Preceded by: Trilok Dewan
- Succeeded by: Neeraj Zimba
- Constituency: Darjeeling

Personal details
- Party: Gorkha Janmukti Morcha
- Education: M.A. Political Science

Amar Singh Rai is an Indian politician. He was elected to the West Bengal Legislative Assembly from Darjeeling in the 2016 West Bengal Legislative Assembly election as a member of the Gorkha Janmukti Morcha.
