= Hamidul Rahman =

Indian politician

Member of the West Bengal Legislative Assembly
- Incumbent
- Assumed office 2011
- Preceded by: Anwarul Haque
- Constituency: Chopra
- In office 2001–2006
- Preceded by: Mohammad Mahamuddin
- Succeeded by: Anwarul Haque
- Constituency: Chopra

Personal details
- Born: 15 May 1959 (age 67) Chopra, West Bengal, India
- Party: All India Trinamool Congress (2012-present) (until 2026); Mamata All India Trinamool Congress (from 2026); Independent (2011); Indian National Congress (until 2011)

Hamidul Rahman is an Indian politician who has won two terms as a member of the West Bengal Legislative Assembly.

Rahman won the Chopra seat in Uttar Dinajpur as an independent candidate in the 2001 election. As an Indian National Congress candidate he lost the same seat in 2006.

In the eventful 2011 elections, which the Congress fought in alliance with All India Trinamool Congress, the Chopra seat was allotted to AITC. However, Rahman contested as an independent candidate and won the seat. In fact, of the 18 rebel Congress candidates who fought elections throughout West Bengal, Rahman was the only winner.

Rahman was initially suspended by the Congress for contesting against the alliance candidate, but was soon taken back into the Congress by his political mentor, Deepa Dasmunsi. Rahman is alleged to have been involved in post-poll violence. Subsequently, Rahman joined AITC.

== Controversies ==
=== Election Commission show-cause notice ===
Hamidul Rahman made headlines with controversial remarks during a public meeting in Uttar Dinajpur. Addressing supporters, Rahman warned voters of severe consequences if they did not vote for the TMC in the upcoming elections. His speech suggested that while central forces would leave after the elections, TMC's own forces would remain to enforce repercussions on those who opposed the party.

Rahman stated that votes should not be wasted on other parties, framing a vote for the CPM-Congress alliance as indirectly supporting the BJP. He implied that voters who did not support the TMC would face issues post-election and that he would not intervene on their behalf. Furthermore, he directed his own party members to ensure at least 90% of votes in each booth went to the TMC, threatening local leaders and panchayat members with consequences if this target was not met.

The Election Commission of India (ECI) issued a show-cause notice to Rahman following these remarks, citing intimidation of voters. The controversy around his comments led to significant backlash from opposition parties, particularly the BJP, which accused him of attempting to influence the electoral process through threats and intimidation.

State Legislative Assembly
Preceded by Mahamuddin (CPI-M)	Member of the West Bengal Legislative Assembly from Chopra Assembly constituency 2001–2006	Succeeded by Anwarul Haque (CPI-M)
Preceded by Anwarul Haque (CPI-M)	Member of the West Bengal Legislative Assembly from Chopra Assembly constituency 2011–	Incumbent
