= Bharatiya Gorkha Janashakti =

Indian political party

Bharatiya Gorkha Janashakti (BGJ or BGJS; 'Indian Gorkha People's Power') is a political party in the Darjeeling District of the Indian state of West Bengal. BGJS was launched in 1998, anticipating the 1999 Darjeeling Gorkha Hill Council (DGHC) elections. BGJS was part of the United Front launched by Communist Party of Revolutionary Marxists and Akhil Bharatiya Gorkha League.

BGJS demanded that the Gorkhas should be included as Scheduled Tribes (giving access to quotas and reservations) and that the area of DGHC should be reorganized.

In 2003, BGJS was revived, anticipating the DGHC elections the following year which eventually was not held.

The president of BGJS is C.R. Rai. In 2001, members of the Gorkha National Liberation Front supporting a bandh stoned Rai's house and set two of his three cars on fire.
