= Madanrting =

Madanryting
- suburb
- Location in Meghalaya, India Madanryting (India)
- Coordinates: 25.5623500°N 91.8934200°E
- Under Community Development Block: India
- State: Meghalaya
- District: East Khasi Hills

Government
  - Type: Traditional Chief called Headman elected in the General Meeting of adult citizens
  - Body: Village Durbar

Population (2001)
  - Total: 16,700

Languages
  - Official: Khasi, English
- Time zone: UTC+5:30 (IST)
- Postal code: 94367021
- Vehicle registration: ML

Madanrting is a census town in East Khasi Hills district in the Indian state of Meghalaya.

== Demographics ==
As of 2001 India census, Madanrting had a population of 16,700. Males constitute 51% of the population and females 49%. Madanrting has an average literacy rate of 76%, higher than the national average of 59.5%: male literacy is 80%, and female literacy is 72%. In Madanrting, 13% of the population is under 6 years of age.
