= Bharatiya Gorkha Parisangh =

Non-government national-level organization of Gorkhas ethnic group of India

- Abbreviation: BGP
- Formation: 2001
- Type: Social organization
- Headquarters: Siliguri
- Location: India
- Region served: Sikkim, Delhi, Assam, Uttarakhand, Himachal Pradesh, Maharashtra, Karnataka, Jharkhand, Mizoram, Manipur, Nagaland, Meghalaya, Tripura, Arunachal Pradesh, Jammu and Kashmir, Chhattisgarh, Uttar Pradesh and Punjab
- Members: The Bharatiya Gorkha Parisangh has both institutional and individual memberships
- Official language: Nepali
- Website: gorkhaparisangh.com

Bharatiya Gorkha Parisangh (Nepali: भारतीय गोर्खा परिसंघ; translation: Indian Gorkha Confederation) is a non-government national-level organization of Gorkhas (Nepali) ethnic group of India.

Bharatiya Gorkha Parisangh was established in 2001. It has its headquarters at Siliguri, in the Darjeeling district of West Bengal and unit offices in almost all the regions of India, including the states of Delhi, Sikkim, Assam, Uttarakhand, Himachal Pradesh, Maharashtra, Karnataka, Jharkhand, Mizoram, Manipur, Nagaland, Meghalaya, Tripura, Arunachal Pradesh, Jammu and Kashmir, Chhattisgarh, Uttar Pradesh and Punjab. Its former National President Munish Tamang resigned before joining the Congress party.

== Vision ==
The Bharatiya Gorkha Parisangh is committed to the vision of a Gorkha (Nepali) society in India, recognized and accepted as a dignified, cultured and patriotic society at par with any other civilized modern Indian society enjoying the full rights and privileges enshrined in the Indian Constitution.

== Mission ==
The Bharatiya Gorkha Parisangh is committed to the task of bonding each and every member of the Gorkha community in a national, unified body through systematic planning and orientation, thereby strengthening and guiding them in all aspects of their social, cultural, educational, economic and political growth.

== Demands ==
Bharatiya Gorkha Parisangh has identified six issues of the Indian Gorkhas to be resolved at the national level:

1. Creation of a separate state for the Gorkhas of India
2. Identification of the problems of tea garden and cinchona plantation in Darjeeling-Dooars as a national problem
3. Addressing the sense of insecurity and uncertainty in the minds of Gorkhas of Northeast India
4. Commissioning of a Doordarshan channel dedicated to the Nepali-speaking Gorkhas
5. Accessing for Gorkhas all social benefits under Constitutional provisions like SC, ST, OBC, etc., in all parts of India and nomination of Gorkhas to public and government bodies
6. Recognition of Gorkhas as a linguistic minority community

== Membership ==
The Bharatiya Gorkha Parisangh has both institutional and individual memberships. Many cultural, literary and social organizations are associated with it. The Parisangh also has individuals in its rolls, including eminent political leaders, litterateurs, cultural personalities, academics and professionals. Its main membership - and its strength - however, remains the mass of common people who aspire to be active players in the progress of India.
