= Democratic Federation of Burma =

Democratic Federation of Burma (DFB) is a political organization in Burma, advocating for democracy and human rights. It was founded in 1989 in Burma and was banned by the military junta in 1990. More than 15 top leaders were sent to jail and some sacrificed their lives in the prison. Many active members including the present leader Moethee Zun live in exile today. On February 25, 2007, DFB and eight other Burmese organizations formed the All Burma Democratic Force (ABDF) to serve the interests of Burmese people in exile and to achieve the goal of democratic transition in Burma more effectively. Due to the ban and repression, DFB's activity is limited to protests in exile and along the Thai border.
