= Gorkha Rashtriya Congress =

Regionalist political party in India

Gorkha Rashtriya Congress (GRC) is a political party spearheading the unification of Darjeeling and Dooars with Sikkim.

D.K. Bomzan was the founding president of this party. After his death on 7 October 2010, Nima Lama became the new president.

In September 2010, GRC filed an RTI with the Sikkim government regarding the ownership of the territory under Darjeeling district. A seminar "Sikkim-Darjeeling Merger" was jointly organized by GRC and Sikkim Janashakti Party at Darjeeling in September 2010, which was attended by All India Gorkha League and Matri Bhumi Surakhsa Sangathan.
