= Democratic Revolutionary Youth Federation =

Indian political party youth wing

The Democratic Revolutionary Youth Federation is the youth wing of Communist Party of Revolutionary Marxists in India.
