= Nongmynsong =

- Census town
- Location in Meghalaya, India Nongmynsong (India)
- Coordinates: 25.596880°N 91.875580°E
- Country: India
- State: Meghalaya
- District: East Khasi Hills

Population (2001)
  - Total: 11,362

Languages
  - Official: Khasi
- Time zone: UTC+5:30 (IST)
- Vehicle registration: ML

Nongmynsong is a census town in East Khasi Hills district in the Indian state of Meghalaya.

== Demographics ==
As of 2001 India census, Nongmynsong had a population of 11,362. Males constitute 52% of the population and females 48%. Nongmynsong has an average literacy rate of 69%, higher than the national average of 59.5%: male literacy is 74%, and female literacy is 64%. In Nongmynsong, 15% of the population is under 6 years of age.

Nongmynsong formerly known as LALCHAND BASTI, is situated in Shillong (U/A).

Nongmynsong is accessible from Shillong City main hub via multiple modes of transport such as taxis and buses en route to NEIGRIHMS.

Nongmynsong is small with a scarcity of water.
