= Pynthorumkhrah =

- Census town
- Location in Meghalaya, India Pynthorumkhrah (India)
- Coordinates: 25.5876400°N 91.921600°E
- Country: India
- State: Meghalaya
- District: East Khasi Hills

Population (2001)
  - Total: 22,108

Languages
  - Official: English
- Time zone: UTC+5:30 (IST)
- Vehicle registration: ML

Pynthorumkhrah is a census town in East Khasi Hills district in the Indian state of Meghalaya. The Census Town has total administration over 5,755 houses.

== Demographics ==
According to 2011 Census, the town has total population of 27,219 of which 13,706 are males while 13,513 are females.

The population of children aged 0-6 is 3391 which is 12.46 % of total population of this town. Sex ratio is of 986 which is slightly lower than the Meghalaya state average of 989. Moreover the child sex ratio in Pynthormukhrah is around 921, which is very less than the state average of 970. The literacy rate of this town is 88.74 %, which is higher than the state average of 74.43 %. In the town, male literacy is around 91.58 % while the female literacy rate is 85.89 %.
