= Noman Rai =

Indian politician

Member of the West Bengal Legislative Assembly
- Incumbent
- Assumed office 4 May 2026
- Preceded by: Neeraj Zimba
- Constituency: Darjeeling

Personal details
- Born: 1981 (age 44–45)
- Party: Bharatiya Janata Party
- Profession: Politician

Noman Rai is an Indian politician from West Bengal. He won in the 2026 West Bengal Legislative Assembly election from Darjeeling, as a member of the Bharatiya Janata Party.
