= Ratna Bahadur Rai =

Indian politician (born 1948)

Member of Parliament, Lok Sabha
- In office 1996-1998
- Preceded by: Inderjeet
- Succeeded by: Ananda Pathak
- Constituency: Darjeeling, West Bengal

Member of Parliament, Rajya Sabha
- In office 1989-1996
- Constituency: West Bengal

Personal details
- Born: 6 March 1948 (age 78) Rungmook Tea Estate, Darjeeling district, West Bengal, India
- Party: Communist Party of India (Marxist)
- Spouse: Neelam Rai

Ratna Bahadur Rai is an Indian politician. He was elected to the Lok Sabha, lower house of the Parliament of India from Darjeeling, West Bengal as a member of the Communist Party of India (Marxist).
