= Sarita Rai =

Indian politician

Member of the West Bengal Legislative Assembly
- In office 2016–2021
- Constituency: Kalimpong (Vidhan Sabha constituency)

Personal details
- Born: Kolkata, West Bengal, India
- Party: Gorkha Janmukti Morcha
- Occupation: Politician

Sarita Rai (born 1959) is an Indian politician from West Bengal, India. She was a member of the West Bengal Legislative Assembly representing Gorkha Janmukti Morcha from Kalimpong Assembly constituency from 2016 to 2021.

== Early life and education ==
Rai is from Kalimpong, West Bengal. She is a teacher of Nepali language at St George's School, Pedong. She married late Uday Prakash Rai. She completed her MA in history at University of North Bengal in 1999. Earlier, she did her BEd, also at University of North Bengal, in 1980.

== Career ==
Rai won the 2016 West Bengal Legislative Assembly election from the Kalimpong (Vidhan Sabha constituency) representing the Gorkha Janmukti Morcha. She polled 67,693 votes and defeated her nearest rival and sitting MLA Harka Bahadur Chettri, an independent candidate, by a margin of 11,431 votes.

== Political party ==
Sarita Rai is from Gorkha Janmukti Morcha.
