= Subhash Ghisingh =

Indian politician (1936–2015)

Subash Ghisingh

Chairman of Darjeeling Gorkha Hill Council
- In office 1988–2008

Personal details
- Born: 22 June 1936 Manju Tea Estate, Mirik, Darjeeling, British India
- Died: 29 January 2015 (aged 78) New Delhi
- Spouse: Dhan Kumari
- Occupation: Politician

Subash Ghisingh was an Indian politician who was the leader of Gorkha National Liberation Front (GNLF), which he founded in 1980. He was the chairman of the Darjeeling Gorkha Hill Council in West Bengal, India from 1988 to 2008. He spearheaded the Gorkhaland movement in the 1980s.

The Gorkhaland movement grew from the demand of Gorkhas living in Darjeeling Himalayan region of West Bengal for a separate state. The Gorkhaland National Liberation Front led the movement, which disrupted the district with massive violence between 1986 and 1988, leading to the deaths of many who were involved. The issue was resolved, at least temporarily, in 1988 with the establishment of the Darjeeling Gorkha Hill Council within West Bengal.

After a prolonged illness, Subhash Ghisingh died on 29 January 2015 at Ganga Ram Hospital in New Delhi. The hospital authorities released a statement stating that Subhash Ghisingh was suffering from pneumonia and liver cancer. Ghisingh's son Mohan Ghisingh was named the new party chief by the GNLF.

== Sixth Schedule and exile ==
The fourth DGHC elections were due in 2004. However, the government decided not to hold elections and instead made Subhash Ghisingh the sole caretaker of the DGHC till a Sixth Schedule tribal council was established in the Darjeeling hills. Most of the other political parties and organisations opposed the setting up of a Sixth Schedule tribal council as there was only a minority tribal population in the DGHC area. Resentment among the former councillors of DGHC also grew rapidly. Among them, Bimal Gurung, once the trusted aide of Ghisingh, decided to break away from the GNLF. Riding on a mass support for the darjeeling based singer Prashant Tamang, who was the winner of Indian Idol season 3 in 2007, Bimal quickly capitalised on the public support he received for supporting Prashant, and was able to overthrow Ghisingh from the seat of power. Ghisingh resigned from the chairmanship of the DGHC in March 2008

== West Bengal assembly elections 2011 and return from exile ==
After lying in political hibernation for three years, Subhash Ghisingh returned to Darjeeling on 8 April 2011 ahead of the West Bengal assembly elections. His party contested the state assembly elections held on 18 April 2011 from three constituencies in the Darjeeling hills but lost all the three seats that it had won in the earlier election. Ghisingh left the Darjeeling hills again on 16 May 2011 on yet another political hibernation. He later returned to Darjeeling ahead of the Lok Sabha elections in 2014 but remained politically inactive due to his poor health.
