= Akhil Bharatiya Gorkha League =

- Abbreviation: ABGL, AIGL, IGL
- Leader: Pratap Khati
- Founder: Damber Singh Gurung
- Founded: 15 May 1943 (82 years ago)
- Headquarters: Mahabir Building, Ladenla Road, Darjeeling - 734101
- Ideology: Gorkha nationalism Gorkhaland statehood

Party flag
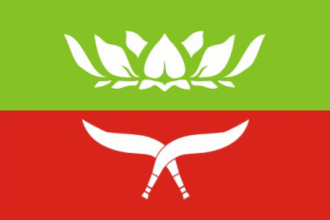

Akhil Bharatiya Gorkha League (ABGL), also known as All India Gorkha League, is a political party working amongst the Nepali-speaking Gorkha population in Darjeeling District and Kalimpong District of West Bengal, India. ABGL was founded in 1943 by Damber Singh Gurung.

ABGL is currently part of an alliance of BJP, GNLF, CPRM and other parties with Pratap Khati as its convenor. ABGL stands for peaceful democracy in the Darjeeling hills. It advocates for a full-fledged state of Gorkhaland.

Ahead of the 1999 DGHC elections, ABGL was part of the United Front, an alliance consisting of Communist Party of Revolutionary Marxists, ABGL, Indian National Congress, Bharatiya Gorkha Janashakti, Communist Party of India, Trinamool Congress, Bharatiya Nepali Bir Gorkha and Sikkim Rashtriya Mukti Morcha.

ABGL was later a part of the People's Democratic Front (PDF), a six-party alliance led by CPRM and including Indian National Congress (Hills), Gorkha National Liberation Front (C.K. Pradhan), ABGL, Bharatiya Janata Party and Gorkha Democratic Front (a party that was formed by Madan Tamang before his return to ABGL). PDF stood for Gorkha autonomy but was opposed to the Gorkha National Liberation Front (GNLF) led by Subhash Ghisingh.

On 21 May 2010, ABGL president Madan Tamang was stabbed to death (allegedly by Gorkha Janmukti Morcha (GJM) supporters) in Darjeeling, which led to a spontaneous shutdown in the three Darjeeling hill sub-divisions of Darjeeling, Kalimpong and Kurseong. Subsequently his wife Bharati Tamang was elected as the ABGL president.

ABGL contested the West Bengal legislative assembly elections held on 18 April 2011 from three constituencies in the Darjeeling hills. The three candidates Bharati Tamang from Darjeeling, Tribhuwan Rai from Kalimpong and Shiva Kumar Pradhan from Kurseong all lost the elections.

Due to internal fights, ABGL broke up into three factions, headed by Bharati Tamang, Pratap Khati and Laxman Pradhan, respectively. After the merger of the factions of Pratap Khati and Laxman Pradhan and the dissolution of the Bharati Tamang faction, only one ABGL headed by Pratap Khati exists today.

The flag of the ABGL consists of two equal horizontal stripes. The upper is light green and has an image of a white lotus; the lower is red with two crossed traditional Gorkha knives, called Khurkuri.
