= Bharat Chettri =

Indian field hockey player

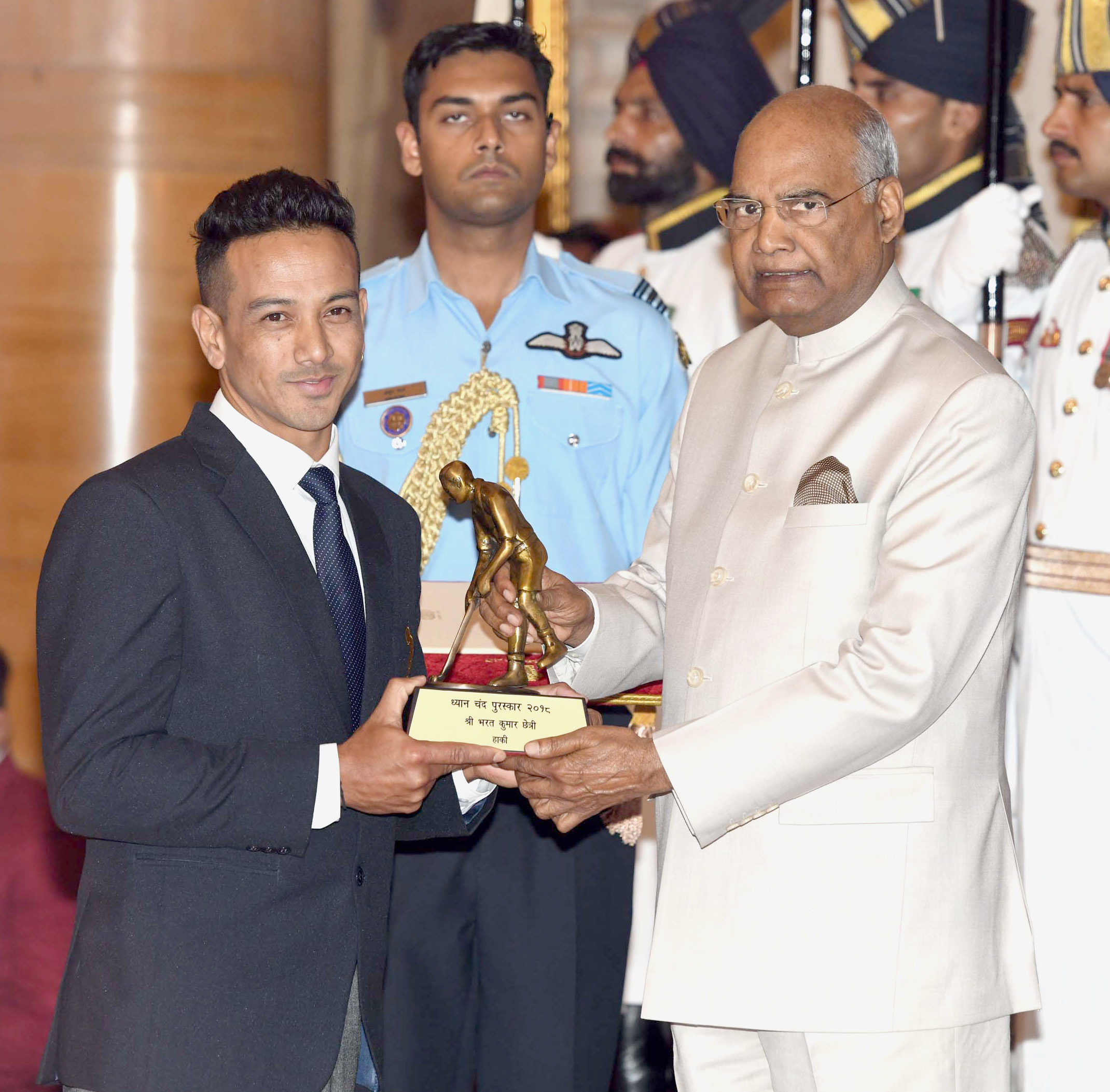

Personal information
- Born: 15 December 1981 (age 44) Kalimpong, West Bengal, India

Sport
- Sport: Field hockey
- Position: Goalkeeper
Senior career
Years	Team	Caps	Goals
–	Services	-	-
2013–present	Punjab Warriors	14	0
National team
Years	Team	Caps	Goals
2001–present	India		-
Medal record
Men's field hockey
Representing India
Asian Games
Silver medal – second place	2002 Busan	Team
Bronze medal – third place	2010 Guangzhou	Team
Asian Champions Trophy
Gold medal – first place	2011 Ordos City
Commonwealth Games
Silver medal – second place	2010 Delhi	Team

Bharat Chettri

Member of West Bengal Legislative Assembly
- Incumbent
- Assumed office 4 May 2026
- Constituency: Kalimpong

Bharat Kumar Chettri (born 15 December 1981 in Kalimpong, West Bengal) is an Indian former field hockey player and politician. He played as a goalkeeper for the Indian national hockey team.

== Career ==
Chettri's professional career in field hockey began after he joined the Sports Authority of India's Centre of Excellence in Bangalore in 1998. He made his debut in international hockey in 2001 playing in the Prime Minister's Gold Cup tournament in Dhaka, Bangladesh. He was first appointed the captain of the Indian national team in October 2011 for the four-nation Super Series and an international tournament in Australia. He was the captain of the 18-member Indian squad at the 2012 Sultan Azlan Shah Cup in Malaysia, which won the bronze medal. Chettri led the 16-member Indian hockey squad in the 2012 Olympic Games in London.

Following poor performances at the Olympics, Chettri, Sandeep Singh and Shivendra Singh were dropped from the squad.

=== Hockey India League ===
In the auction of the first edition of the Hockey India League, Chettri was bought by Punjab Warriors for $19,000 with his base price being $18,500. He went unsold in the first round and was bought in the second round of auction.

== Political career ==
He contested in the 2026 West Bengal Legislative Assembly election as a Bharatiya Janata Party candidate from Kalimpong Assembly constituency and has become MLA.

== Awards ==
- Banga Ratna in 2015
- Banga Bibhushan in 2016
