= 2021 West Bengal Legislative Assembly election =

Indian state election

- 27 March – 29 April 2021 (292 seats); 30 September 2021 (2 seats)

294 seats in the West Bengal Legislative Assembly 148 seats needed for a majority
- Opinion polls
- Registered: 73,414,746
- Turnout: 82.3% (▼0.72 pp)
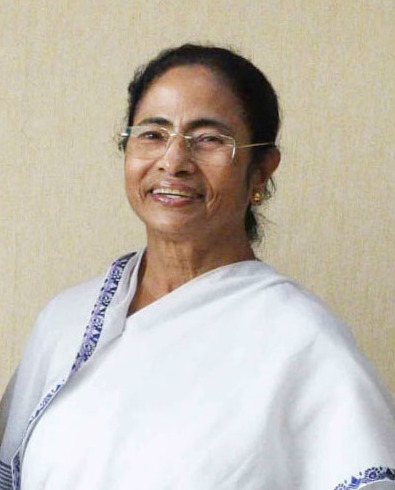

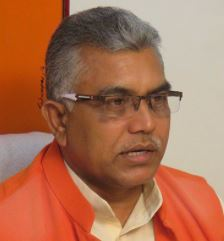
	Majority party	Minority party
Leader	Mamata Banerjee	Dilip Ghosh
Party	AITC	BJP
Alliance	AITC+	NDA
Leader since	1998	2015
Leader's seat	Nandigram (lost); Bhabanipur (By-elected)	Did not contest (Note: Ghosh was the sitting MP for Medinipur.)
Last election	44.91% votes 211 seats	10.16% votes 3 seats
Seats won	215	77
Seat change	▲4	▲74
Popular vote	28,968,281	22,905,474
Percentage	48.02%	37.97%
Swing	▲3.11 pp	▲27.81 pp
- Map of the election results

- Structure of the West Bengal Legislative Assembly after election
Chief Minister before election
Mamata Banerjee
AITC
Chief Minister after election
Mamata Banerjee
AITC

Legislative Assembly elections were held in West Bengal, to elect all 294 members of West Bengal Legislative Assembly. This electoral process of 292 seats unfolded between 27 March to 29 April 2021, taking place in eight phases. Voting for the two remaining constituencies was delayed to 30 September 2021.

The incumbent All India Trinamool Congress government led by Mamata Banerjee won the election by a landslide, despite opinion polls generally predicting a close race against the Bharatiya Janata Party, which became the official opposition with 77 seats. For the first time in the history of West Bengal, no members from the Indian National Congress and Communist Party of India (Marxist) were elected.

The elections were followed by post-poll violence, in which many BJP workers were killed by the perpetuators linked to the ruling AITC party, though some AITC workers also died. The violence also led to deaths and rapes of women, and many BJP workers' families were forced to flee the state.

== Background ==
=== Electoral system ===
Outlined in Article 168 of the Constitution of India, the West Bengal Legislative Assembly is the only house of the unicameral legislature of West Bengal, not a permanent body, and subject to dissolution. The assembly term lasts for five years unless it is dissolved earlier. Members of the Legislative Assembly are directly elected by the people, and the tenure of the Sixteenth West Bengal Legislative Assembly was scheduled to end on 30 May 2021.

=== Previous general election ===
In the 2016 election, the All India Trinamool Congress (AITC or TMC) retained its majority in the Legislative Assembly with 211 seats. The Indian National Congress won 44 seats and the Left Front won 33 seats from their alliance, while the Bharatiya Janata Party and the Gorkha Janmukti Morcha won 3 seats each out of the total 294 seats.

=== Political developments ===
Since the by-elections held for the Kanthi South seat in 2017, it became evident that the Bharatiya Janata Party (BJP) had overtaken the Left Front as the primary opposition party in the state. According to various political analysts, the shifting of the Left Front and other opposition voters towards the BJP caused the party's vote share to significantly increase. In spite of widespread violence, the BJP emerged as the second largest party in the 2018 elections to the state panchayats mainly due to the shifting of the Left Front's voter base. The long-held stereotype of Bengali Hindus being averse to right-wing politics was shattered when the BJP won the 2018 assembly elections in Tripura, another Indian state with a Bengali Hindu majority, ruled till then by CPI(M)-led alliance of Communist parties since 1993.

Results of the 2019 Lok Sabha elections in West Bengal broken down into Vidhan Sabha level

Party	2016 West Bengal Vidhan Sabha election	2016 voteshare	West Bengal Vidhan Sabha segments (as of 2019 India Lok Sabha election)	2019 voteshare	Change in seats	Change in voteshare (in terms of pp)
BJP	3	10.16%	121	40.7%	▲118	▲30.54
INC	44	12.25%	9	5.67%	▼35	▼6.58
TMC	211	44.91%	164	43.3%	▼47	▼1.61
LF	32	19.75%	0	6.33%	▼32	▼13.42
Others	1	2.26%	0	NA	▼1	NA

In the 2019 general elections, the BJP increased its number of Lok Sabha seats from 2 to 18, and took 40% of the vote share, an increase from 11% in the 2016 elections. Trinamool Congress (TMC) was reduced from 34 to 22 seats, Indian National Congress (INC) was reduced from 4 to 2 seats, and for the first time since their individual inceptions, no party from the Left Front (namely CPI(M), CPI, AIFB and RSP) was able to win a single seat from the state. This was the best ever performance of the BJP in the state (where it had never won more than 2 seats) in terms of both seats and voteshare. Public anger towards corruption and hooliganism of a section of TMC cadres in rural areas during the 2018 panchayat elections, religious polarisation by BJP fueled by resentment of a section of Bengali Hindu society towards Mamata Banerjee's tactics of Muslim appeasement, and large scale support of the Rajbongshi and Matua communities for granting Indian citizenship to exclusively non-Muslim Bangladeshi immigrants over fears of a demographic change fuelled by infiltration of undocumented Muslim immigrants from Bangladesh, allegedly supported by Mamata Banerjee have been cited as important reasons behind the rise of BJP in West Bengal alongside the decline of Left Front.

With Narendra Modi becoming the only non-Congress prime minister to remain in power for two consecutive terms (amounting to ten years) without depending on the support of the National Democratic Alliance, and the BJP fulfilling the wish of its founder Shyamaprasad Mukherjee (Note: Shyamaprasad Mukherjee was initially a member of the Hindu Mahasabha. After the Mahasabha became unpopular due to its involvement in the assassination of Mahatma Gandhi, Mukherjee formed a new Hindu right-wing party called Bharatiya Jana Sangh (BJS). During the Emergency era, Atal Bihari Vajpayee merged the BJS with other parties to form the Janata Party. Following disagreements with Morarji Desai over his Rashtriya Swayamsevak Sangh (RSS) membership, Vajpayee broke away from the Janata Party and re-created the BJS under the name of BJP. Although Vajpayee is the legal founder of BJP, the party sees itself as a continuation of BJS and thus considers Mukherjee to be the founder of BJP.) by revoking the special status of Jammu and Kashmir and long standing promise of resolving the Ayodhya dispute in favour of Hindus, the party considered the formation of a BJP-led state government in West Bengal (a state which has historically never voted for right-wing parties in large numbers) for the first time as a means of paying homage to Mukherjee, who hailed from there. A BJP victory in West Bengal would have also demoralised Mamata Banerjee's attempts of creating a non-BJP non-Congress alliance of regional parties that might play an important role in the upcoming general elections.

BJP increased their seats in the assembly from 3 to 53 when the West Bengal Legislative Assembly was dissolved through defections from TMC, INC, and Left Front leaders, and by-elections from 2016 to 2021. A prominent defector in December 2020 was Suvendu Adhikari, who was a long-time associate of Mamata Banerjee, and a state cabinet minister who was dissatisfied over the rising influence of her nephew Abhishek Banerjee in the party. However, Adhikari revealed that he was in contact with the BJP since 2014 after he joined the party. His father Sisir Adhikari, the MP from Kanthi, also defected from TMC to BJP. Another cabinet minister, Rajib Banerjee, also joined BJP.

However, the TMC won the Kharagpur Sadar seat from BJP and Kaliaganj seat from the INC, while retaining the Karimpur seat in the by-polls held later in 2019 after Abhishek Banerjee employed Prashant Kishor as the election strategist of Trinamool Congress for the upcoming polls. Elections to municipal bodies of West Bengal (which include 112 municipalities (Note: Apart from these, an announcement about two new municipalities was made in October 2021. Bally Municipality was re-established on 12 November 2021.) and the municipal corporations of Kolkata, Howrah, Bidhannagar, Chandannagar, Asansol and Siliguri) could not be held as scheduled in 2020 due to the COVID-19 pandemic in India.

== Political issues ==
=== COVID-19 ===
The pandemic became an election issue. The government was accused of "fudging" the count of positive cases and deaths in the region, and the AITC-led state government and BJP-led union government blamed each other for the surge in COVID-19 infections over the course of the campaign.

The BJP accused Mamata Banerjee of not attending COVID-19 emergency management meetings held during the months of election campaigning, despite the second wave of infections, and for also holding election rallies. Sanjukta Morcha held the first Brigade rally ahead of polling in West Bengal. In mid-April, TMC requested holding the remaining phases of the elections in a single phase amid the rising number of COVID cases, but it was rejected by the Election Commission of India (ECI).

=== Cyclone Amphan ===
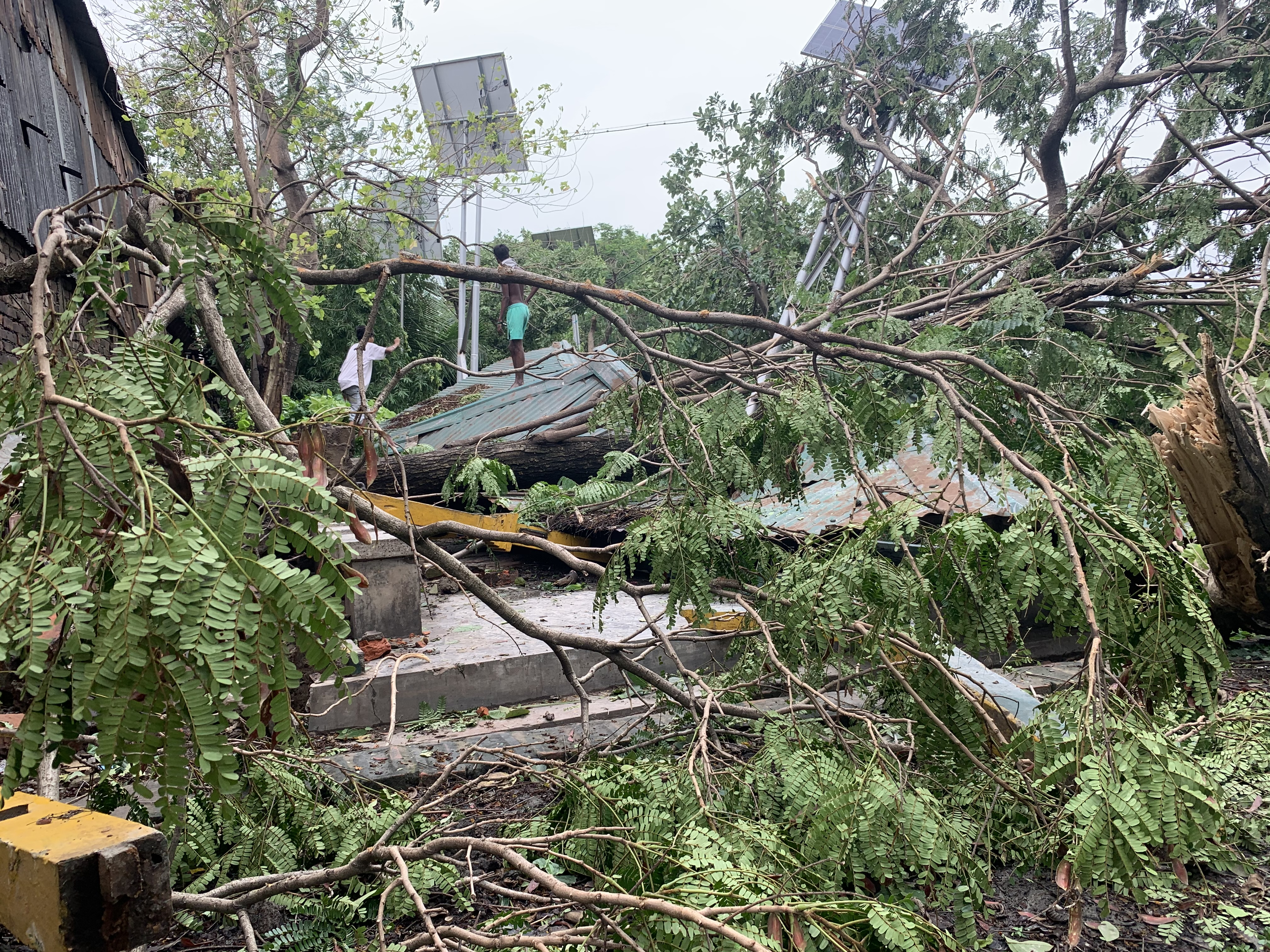
Post-Cyclone Amphan situation of Deshbandhu park in Kolkata

In May 2020, a year before the 2021 elections, Cyclone Amphan hit the state. After it passed, widespread allegations of mismanagement and relief scam were reported. Protests broke out in some districts over the allegations, and the opposition made it an election issue ahead of the Assembly polls.

=== Citizenship, immigration and refugee issues ===
In 2019, the BJP-led Union Government passed the CAA in Parliament, promising citizenship to immigrants and refugees belonging to religious minorities in Bangladesh, and providing them with rehabilitation. The BJP's Bengali booklet released in January 2020 claimed that the National Register of Citizens was implemented to identify allegedly undocumented illegal Muslim immigrants, but religiously persecuted Hindus, Sikhs, Buddhists, Christians, Jains, Parsi, and other religious minorities would be "shielded" by the CAA.

=== Other issues ===
Polarisation amongst various religious, linguistic, and caste communities were also likely to play a role in this election. Both TMC and BJP had promised schemes for various communities. Although previously mobilized by Left governments against elites under the "class" narrative, the Dalits of West Bengal began to assert their identity politically. Religious polarization is particularly intense in districts bordering Bangladesh, such as North 24 Parganas. Arguments regarding who are native to the state and constituencies were also likely to impact the elections. Dissatisfaction and defection of many TMC leaders to BJP, allegedly due to rising influence of Abhishek Banerjee and Kishor in party administration was also likely to impact the elections.

An event was organised by the Ministry of Cultural Affairs in Kolkata's Victoria Memorial to commemorate Netaji Subhas Chandra Bose's 125th birth anniversary, which was attended by PM Narendra Modi and CM Mamata Banerjee among others. A large number of BJP activists were present in the crowd. Just as Banerjee got up to speak, BJP supporters started chanting "Jai Shri Ram" which prompted the CM to abandon her speech. This incident led to a political slugfest between the BJP and the TMC ahead of the upcoming elections. Meanwhile, Bengal BJP president Dilip Ghosh made controversial remarks about Netaji. Mamata claimed that the BJP had "insulted Netaji and Bengal" by their actions. The BJP leadership criticised Banerjee while the Left Front and the Congress backed her and condemned the BJP for the incident of Victoria Memorial. Not only political personalities but also non-political people from different levels of the society, including Netaji's grandnephew Sugata Bose, condemned the incident of chanting religiopolitical slogans by BJP supporters which was unlikely for an apolitical event dedicated to Netaji.

== Schedule ==
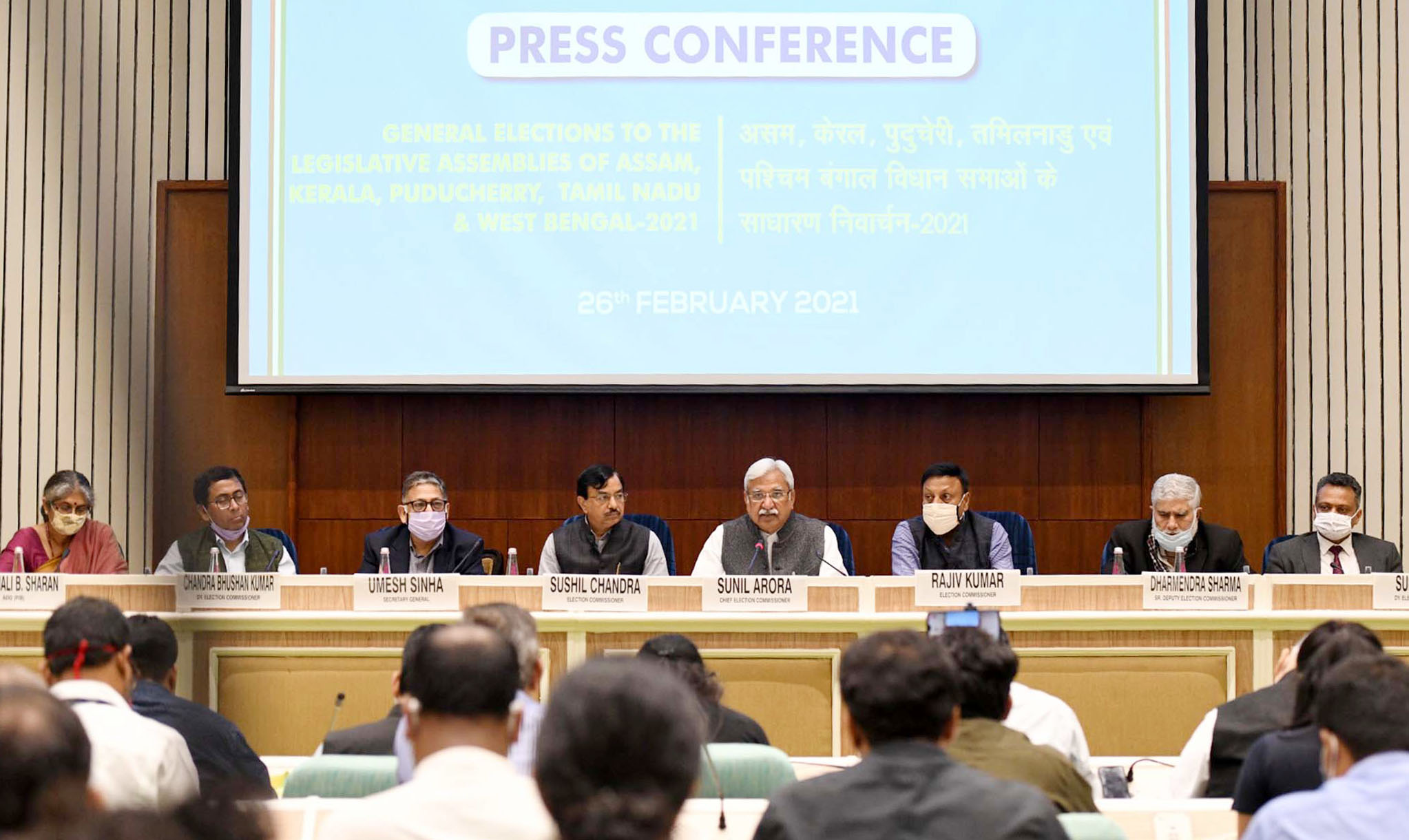
The Chief Election Commissioner, Sunil Arora holding a press conference to announce the schedule for Legislative Assembly election of West Bengal along with Assam, Kerala, Tamil Nadu, and Puducherry, in New Delhi on 26 February 2021. The Election Commissioners, Sushil Chandra and Rajiv Kumar and the senior officials of ECI are also seen.

The election schedule was announced on 26 February 2021, and the election was held in eight phases from 27 March 2021 to 29 April 2021. Votes were counted on 2 May 2021. On the day of announcement, the ECI declared that physically disabled and elderly voters would get the benefit of postal voting and the time limit for voting was extended by one hour. Due to polling abnormalities, re-polling for booth number 88 in Jangipara was held in the fourth phase. The elections in Jangipur and Samserganj were adjourned due to the death of the INC candidate in Samserganj and Revolutionary Socialist Party (RSP) candidate in Jangipur. Polling for these two seats was originally rescheduled to 13 May 2021, but as that day was Eid, it was pushed back to 16 May. Later on ECI adjourned polling for both constituencies and it took place on 30 September. Repolling at the Amtali Madhyamik Siksha Kendra polling station in Sitalkuchi was conducted on 29 April, after CISF personnel were fired on 10 April.

Schedule
Poll event	Phase								
Poll event	I	II	III	IV	V	VI	VII	VIII	—
Map of constituencies and their phases									
No. of constituencies	30	30	31	44	45	43	34	35	2
Date of issue of notification	2 March 2021	5 March 2021	12 March 2021	16 March 2021	23 March 2021	26 March 2021	31 March 2021	31 March 2021	—
Last date for filling nomination	9 March 2021	12 March 2021	19 March 2021	23 March 2021	30 March 2021	3 April 2021	7 April 2021	7 April 2021	26 April 2021 (Note: For candidates only sponsored by the Indian National Congress in Samserganj and Revolutionary Socialist Party in Jangipur.)
Scrutiny of nomination	11 March 2021	15 March 2021	20 March 2021	24 March 2021	31 March 2021	5 April 2021	8 April 2021	8 April 2021	27 April 2021
Last date for withdrawal of nomination	12 March 2021	17 March 2021	22 March 2021	26 March 2021	3 April 2021	7 April 2021	12 April 2021	12 April 2021	29 April 2021
Date of poll	27 March 2021	1 April 2021	6 April 2021	10 April 2021	17 April 2021	22 April 2021	26 April 2021	29 April 2021	30 September 2021
Date of counting of votes	2 May 2021								3 October 2021

== Parties and alliances ==
=== All India Trinamool Congress+ ===
Map of the seat sharing arrangements of the All India Trinamool Congress for the 2021 West Bengal Legislative Assembly election

Both factions of the Gorkha Janmukti Morcha (GJM) expressed support for TMC in the assembly election. TMC allotted three seats in the Darjeeling to GJM, but its two factions, namely Bimal and Binoy, declared fielding their candidates in each of the three seats. RJD, Shiv Sena, and JMM also endorsed Trinamool for the election.

All India Trinamool Congress+
Party	Flag	Symbol	Leader	Seats
All India Trinamool Congress			Mamata Banerjee	290
Gorkha Janmukti Morcha (Tamang) (Note: Tamang faction of GJM Contested as Independent in 3 constituencies.)			Binoy Tamang	3
Gorkha Janmukti Morcha (Gurung) (Note: Gurung faction of GJM Contested as Independent in 3 constituencies.) (Note: ECI had allotted Television symbol in AC 23 Darjeeling and Table symbol in AC 22 Kalimpong and AC 24 Kurseong constituencies.)			Bimal Gurung	3
Independent (Note: Trinamool Congress supported Independent candidate in Joypur after their candidate's nomination was cancelled.)			Dibyajoti Singh Deo	1
Total				294+3

=== National Democratic Alliance ===
Five hill-based parties pledged support to BJP ahead of the assembly election: Gorkha National Liberation Front (GNLF), Communist Party of Revolutionary Marxists, Akhil Bharatiya Gorkha League (ABGL), Gorkhaland Rajya Nirman Morcha, and SUMETI Mukti Morcha. Hindu Samhati, a right-wing organisation in West Bengal, had withdrawn their support from the BJP at first to contest the elections on their own, but eventually they supported the BJP. BJP allotted the Amta constituency seat to the president of Hindu Samhati to contest under the symbol of BJP.

Map of the seat sharing arrangements of the Bharatiya Janata Party for the 2021 West Bengal Legislative Assembly election

BJP also allotted the Baghmundi constituency, bordering Jharkhand, to the All Jharkhand Students Union (AJSU).

National Democratic Alliance
Party	Flag	Symbol	Leader	Seats
Bharatiya Janata Party			Dilip Ghosh	293
All Jharkhand Students Union			Ashutosh Mahto	1
Total				294

=== Sanjukta Morcha ===
On 28 January 2021 Congress leader Adhir Ranjan Chowdhury announced that seat-sharing talks between the Congress and Left Front had concluded for 193 seats and that the remaining 101 seats would be decided at a later point. Out of the 193 seats agreed upon by 28 January 92 went to Congress and 101 to the Left Front. Left Front and Congress announced from a rally at the Brigade Parade ground on 28 February 2021 that they would form an alliance called Sanyukta Morcha with a newly-formed outfit called AISF. ISF initially claimed that they secured 30 seats from the Left Front's quota. After the final seat sharing agreement was concluded, it was announced that the Left Front would contest 165 seats, Congress 92 seats, and ISF 37 seats.

Left Front chairman Biman Bose announced the candidates for the first and second-phase elections on 5 March alongside INC and ISF leaders, leaving seats for them in the list. INC revealed its first list of 13 candidates for the first two phases on 6 March. Left Front announced its second list of candidates on 10 March, consisting of several new and young faces from All India Students Federation (AISF), All India Youth Federation (AIYF), Students' Federation of India (SFI), and Democratic Youth Federation of India (DYFI), along with ex-ministers of the Left Front government and ex-MPs; Bose also nominated DYFI West Bengal state president Minakshi Mukherjee as the CPI(M) candidate for the Nandigram seat, which was kept vacant in the first list published on 5 March. On 14 March, INC revealed their second list of 34 candidates on 14 March, and ISF their first set of 20 candidates. Sanyukta Morcha announced 15 more candidates on 17 March consisting of 9 from the Left Front, 2 from INC, and 4 from ISF. INC revealed their third list of 39 candidates on 20 March, and two more on 22 March.

Map of the seat sharing arrangement between the parties of the Sanjukta Morcha for the 2021 West Bengal Legislative Assembly election

Sanjukta Morcha
Party	Flag	Symbol	Leader	Seats
Communist Party of India (Marxist)			Surjya Kanta Mishra	138
Marxist Forward Bloc			Samar Hazra	1
Indian National Congress			Adhir Ranjan Chowdhury	92
All India Secular Front			Abbas Siddiqui (Note: Indian Secular Front is an unregistered political party and it contested the election on the "Envelope" symbol and name of Bihar-based political party Rashtriya Secular Majlis Party (RSMP).)	32
All India Forward Bloc			Debabrata Biswas	21
Revolutionary Socialist Party			Biswanath Chowdhury	11
Communist Party of India			Swapan Banerjee	10
Total				294+11 (Note: A total of 305 candidates were fielded. These candidates contested 283 unique seats. In 11 of those seats, there were two candidates each, making a total of 22 candidates across those constituencies. Overall, the alliance contested all 294 assembly seats.)

==== Friendly contests ====
Sl. No.	Parties Involved	#	Constituency Name
1	INC and AIFB	46	Harishchandrapur
2	INC and AIFB	240	Baghmundi
3	INC and AIFB	241	Joypur
4	INC and AISF	52	Mothabari
5	INC and AISF	53	Sujapur
6	INC and AISF	63	Raninagar
7	INC and AISF	64	Murshidabad
8	INC and AISF	55	Farakka
9	INC and CPI(M)	56	Samserganj
10	CPI(M) and AISF	82	Chapra
11	AISF and AIFB	120	Deganga

=== Others ===
Shiv Sena initially said that they would contest in around 100 seats, but later on 4 March 2021 announced that they would not contest and would support Mamata Banerjee led AITC.

Party	Flag	Symbol	Leader(s)	Seats contested
Socialist Unity Centre of India (Communist)			Provash Ghosh	188
Bahujan Samaj Party			Mayawati	162
Janata Dal (United)			Sanjay Verma	16
Communist Party of India (Marxist–Leninist) Liberation			Dipankar Bhattacharya	12
All India Majlis-e-Ittehadul Muslimeen			Asaduddin Owaisi	6
Communist Party of India (Marxist–Leninist) Red Star			K. N. Ramchandran	3
National People's Party				3

== Surveys and polls ==
=== Exit poll ===
On 27 March, the ECI banned the publication of surveys and exit polls until 7:30 pm on 29 April to prevent influencing voters, but the ban ended half an hour earlier.

Date published	Polling agency					Lead
Date published	Polling agency	AITC+	BJP+	SM	Others	Lead
29 April 2021	ABP News – C-Voter	152–164	109–121	14–25	–	31–55
29 April 2021	ABP News – C-Voter	42.1%	39.2%	15.4%	3.3%	2.9%
29 April 2021	NK Digital Magazine	(193+1)=194	73	22	3	121
30 April – 1 May 2021	Ekhon Biswa Bangla Sangbad	217	63	10±2	2	154
30 April 2021	FAM Community	(182–1)=181	99	(12–1)=11	1	82
29 April 2021	DB Live	154–169	94–109	24–34	0–1	45–75
29 April 2021	Drishtibhongi	174	103	15	2	71
29 April 2021	Drishtibhongi	45%	38%	12%	5%	7%
29 April 2021	Ground Zero Research	154–186	96–124	6–14	2–3	30–90
29 April 2021	IPSOS	158	115	19	–	43
29 April 2021	Today's Chanakya	169–191	97–119	0–8	0–3	50–94
29 April 2021	Today's Chanakya	46%	39%	9%	6%	7%
29 April 2021	ETG Research	164–176	105–115	10–15	0–1	49–71
29 April 2021	ETG Research	42.4%	39.1%	14.2%	4.3%	3.3%
29 April 2021	P-MARQ	152–172	112–132	10–20	–	20–60
29 April 2021	P-MARQ	44%	40%	12%	–	4%
29 April 2021	NEWSX – Polstrat	152–162	115–125	16–26	–	27–47
29 April 2021	TV9 Bharatvarsh – Polstrat'	142–152	125–135	16–26	–	7–27
29 April 2021	TV9 Bharatvarsh – Polstrat'	43.9%	40.5%	10.7%	4.9%	3.4%
29 April 2021	India Today – Axis-My-India	130–156	134–160	0–2	0–1	HUNG
29 April 2021	India Today – Axis-My-India	44%	43%	10%	3%	1%
29 April 2021	India TV – Peoples Pulse	64–88	173–192	7–12	–	85–128
29 April 2021	Jan-Ki-Baat	104–121	162–185	3–9	–	58–64
29 April 2021	Jan-Ki-Baat	44–45%	46–48%	5–8%	2%	1–4%
29 April 2021	Priyo Bandhu Media	82	187	22	1	105
29 April 2021	Arambagh TV	84–119	159–192	11–20	–	40–108
29 April 2021	Sudarshan News	97–104	170–180	6–10	1–3	66–83
Overall average		143–155	121–134	12–17	1	9–34

NK Digital Magazine's exit poll predicted victory for TMC in general election for the Samserganj seat and by-election for the Bhabanipur seat. Ekhon Biswa Bangla Sangbad predicted TMC's victory in all three seats where elections took place on 30 September.

=== Opinion poll ===
A number of pre-poll surveys for the elections were published by different agencies and groups in the span of one year until 27 March. Most polls contradicted each other regarding the possible outcome.

Date published	Polling agency					Lead
Date published	Polling agency	AITC+	NDA	SM	Others	Lead
25 March 2021	P-Marq	121–130	149–158	11–15	–	19–37
25 March 2021	P-Marq	43%	42%	13%	–	1%
25 March 2021	DB Live	170–175	74–79	42–47	0–2	91–101
19–25 March 2021	Priyo Bandhu Media	93	168	33	–	75
24 March 2021	Times Now C-Voter	152–168	104–120	18–26	0–2	32–64
24 March 2021	Times Now C-Voter	42%	37%	13%	8%	32–64
24 March 2021	TV9 Bharatvarsh	146	122	23	3	HUNG
24 March 2021	TV9 Bharatvarsh	39.6%	37.1%	17.4%	5.9%	HUNG
23 March 2021	ABP News – CNX	136–146	130–140	14–18	1–3	HUNG
23 March 2021	ABP News – CNX	40%	38%	16%	6%	HUNG
23 March 2021	India TV- Peoples Pulse	95	183	16	0	88
23 March 2021	Jan-Ki-Baat	118–134	150–162	10–14	0	16–44
23 March 2021	Jan-Ki-Baat	44.1%	44.8%	7.5%	3%	16–44
20 March 2021	Polstrat	163	102	29	0	61
20 March 2021	Polstrat	44.4%	37.4%	11.7%	–	7%
17 March 2021	Shining India	157–179	78–100	28–42	0–4	57–101
15 March 2021	ABP News – C Voter	150–166	98–114	23–31	3–5	36–52
15 March 2021	ABP News – C Voter	43.4%	38.4%	12.7	5.5%	36–52
8 March 2021	ABP News – CNX	154–164	102–112	22–30	01-03	42–62
8 March 2021	ABP News – CNX	42%	34%	20%	4%	42–62
8 March 2021	Times Now – C Voter	146–162	99–112	29–37	0	31–63
8 March 2021	Times Now – C Voter	42.2%	37.5%	14.8%	5.5%	31–63
24 February 2021	Times Democracy	151	131	12	–	20
24 February 2021	Times Democracy	44.10%	39.61%	12.70%	3.59%	4.49%
13–14 February 2021	NK Digital Magazine (Note: This survey was larger than any other opinion poll conducted by other agencies, on the basis of sample size, which for this survey was 147,000.)	192	69	30	3	123
13–14 February 2021	NK Digital Magazine	49%	39%	10%	2%	10%

NK Digital Magazine's opinion poll predicted victory for TMC in Jangipur and Samserganj. They also conducted a pre-poll survey across poll-bound Assembly constituencies that predicted TMC's victory.

== Election ==
=== COVID-19 guidelines ===
The ECI issued various health guidelines for conducting the elections, including the use of masks, sanitisation of the polling booths, use of thermal scanners before entering the polling booths, maintaining social distancing, and so forth. The maximum number of voters for each polling station was lowered to 1000 from 1500.

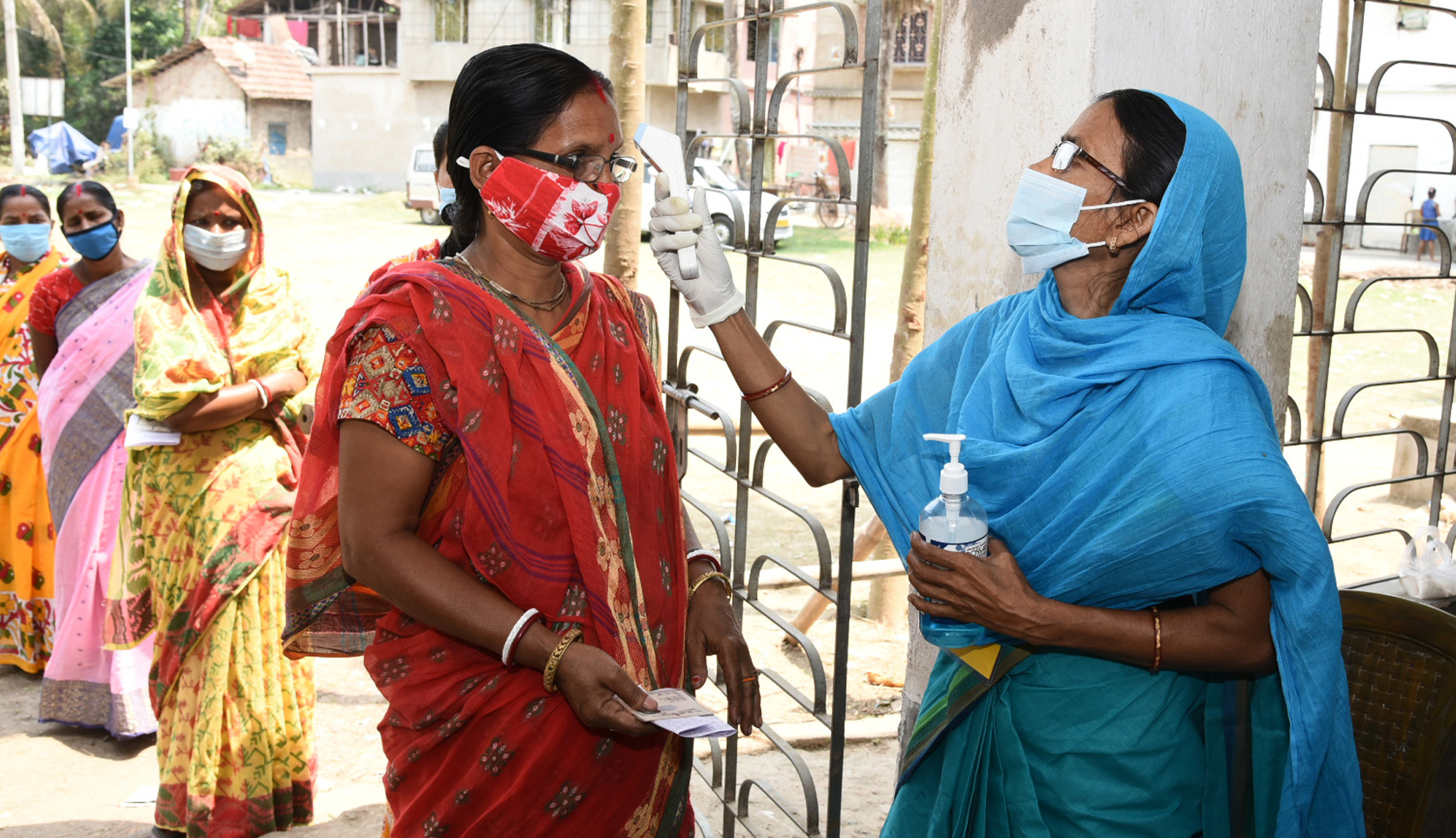
A volunteer conducting thermal screening on voters at a polling booth during the third phase of the West Bengal Assembly Election, in Uluberia, West Bengal, on 6 April 2021

After COVID-19 cases increased in the state, the ECI issued warnings for all recognised state and national political parties to strictly follow COVID-19 guidelines, and banned all political rallies, public meetings, street plays and nukkad sabhas from 7 pm to 10 am starting from 16 April. On 22 April 2021, before the seventh and eighth phases of voting, the ECI forbade roadshows, and added that at most 500 people were allowed in public meetings. On 27 April, they issued a notification over banning victory processions on and after the day the votes were counted.

=== Security preparations ===
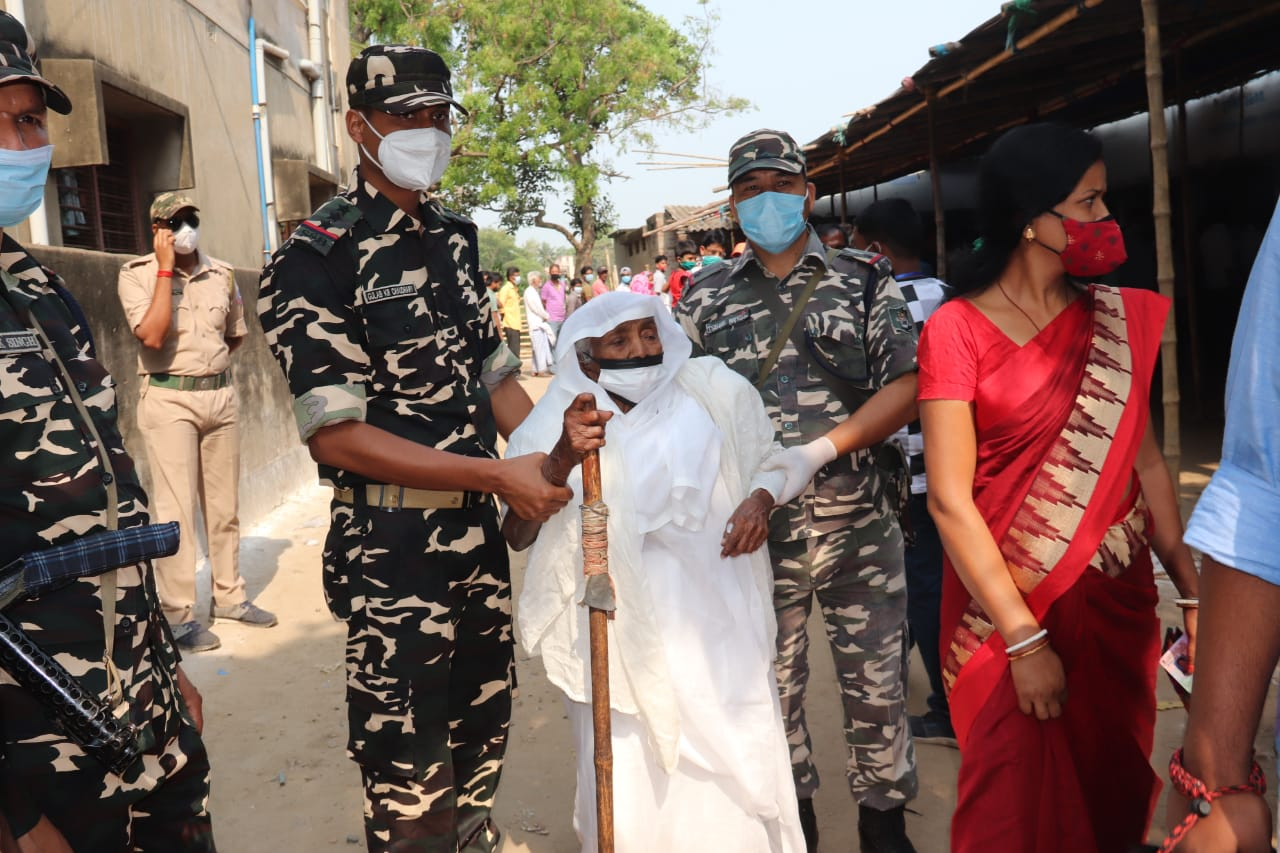
An elderly voter casts her vote with the help of CAPF officers at 260 Bardhaman Dakshin Assembly constituency of the Purba Bardhaman district.

After several instances of violence, threats, and murders before the polls were announced, the ECI and the Home Ministry ordered twelve companies of Central Armed Police Forces (CAPF) to be deployed in West Bengal on 20 February. At least 125 more CAPF troops were dispatched to reach West Bengal on 25 February to focus on sensitive zones. 60 companies of the Central Reserve Police Force (CRPF), 30 companies of the Sashastra Seema Bal (SSB), 25 companies of the Border Security Force (BSF) and five companies each of the Central Industrial Security Force (CISF) and the Indo-Tibetan Border Police (ITBP). The total number of central forces rose to 725, before a final total of 1,000 companies after the third phase of polling.

In the second phase of election, Section 144 of the Code of Criminal Procedure was implemented across areas in the Tamluk and Haldia subdivisions. After the fourth phase of polling, the ECI deployed an extra 71 companies of central forces.

=== Voting ===
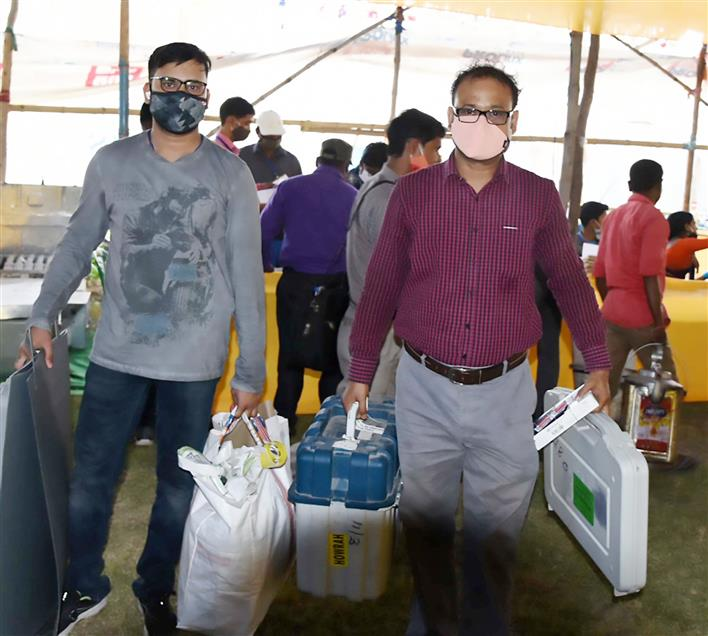
Polling officials carrying the electronic voting machines and other necessary devices required for the West Bengal Assembly election at a distribution centre in Uluberia, West Bengal, on 5 April 2021

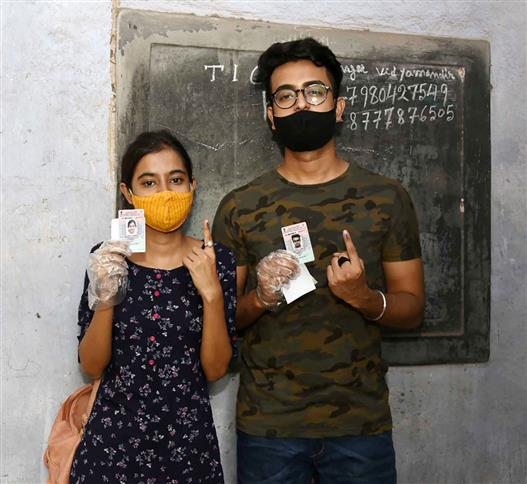
First time voters showing election ink marks after casting their vote at a polling booth during the fourth phase of the West Bengal Assembly election at Nehru Colony Primary School, Regent Park, Kolkata, West Bengal, on 10 April 2021

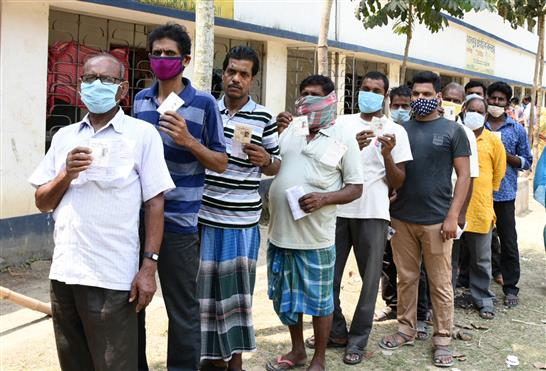
Voters standing in a queue to cast their votes at a polling booth during the third phase of the West Bengal Assembly election, in Uluberia, West Bengal, on 6 April 2021

==== Voter turnout ====
Phase wise voter turnout
Phase	Seats	Voters	Polled	Turnout
I	30	7,380,942		84.63%
II	30	7,594,549		86.11%
III	31	7,852,425		84.61%
IV	44	11,581,022		79.90%
V	45	11,347,344		82.49%
VI	43	10,387,791		82.00%
VII	34	8,188,907		76.89%
VIII	35	8,477,728		78.32%
Later	2	490,212		
Total	294	73,298,428	59,935,989	82.30%

- Number of general voters: 73,294,980
  - Male voters: 37,366,306
  - Female voters: 35,927,084
  - Non-binary voters: 1,590
- Number of service voters: 112,642
- Overseas voters: 210
- Total number of voters: 73,407,832
- Polling stations: 101,916

==== Phases ====
Phase	Description	Citation
I	Nearly 74 lakh voters across 10,288 polling stations of West Bengal were registered in this phase of election. Webcasting was arranged for 5,392 polling stations. During this phase, a total of 10,288 Ballot Units (BUs), 10,288 Control Units (CUs) and 10,288 Voter-verified paper audit trails (VVPATs) were used in West Bengal.	
II	Nearly 73 lakh electorates across 10,592 polling stations of West Bengal were registered in this phase of election. Webcasting were arranged for 5,535 polling stations. During this phase, a total of 10,620 BUs, 10,620 CUs, and 10,620 VVPATs were used. 1,137 Flying Squads (FS) and 1,012 Static Surveillance Teams (SST) checked the transfer of cash, liquor, drugs and freebies. 3 Air Intelligence Units (AIU) of the IT Department were also set up at Kolkata, Andal, Durgapur and Bagdogra. 14,499 cases of Model Code of Conduct violations were reported in West Bengal with 11,630 detained until 4:30 pm of voting day.	
III	A total of 7,852,425 voters were eligible to vote in 10,871 polling stations, out of which, 64,083 were physically disabled voters, and 126,177 voters were above the age of 80. 22 general observers, 7 police observers and 9 expenditure observers were deployed.	
IV	A total of 11,581,022 voters were eligible to vote in this phase of election, of which 50,523 were physically disabled voters, and 203,927 were voters above the age of 80.	
V	A total of 11,347,344 voters were eligible to vote in this phase of election, of which 60,198 were physically disabled, and 179,634 were above the age of 80.	
VI	A total of 10,387,791 voters were eligible to vote in this phase of election, of which 64,266 were physically disabled and 157,290 were above the age of 80.	
VII	A total of 8,188,907 voters were eligible to vote in this phase of election, of which 50,919 were physically disabled and 101,689 were above the age of 80.	
VIII	A total of 8,478,274 voters were eligible to vote in this phase of election, of which 72,094 were physically disabled, and 112,440 were above the age of 80.	

== Incidents ==
- In February, Jakir Hossain, the MLA from Jangipur and Labour Minister of West Bengal, received serious injuries after bombs were thrown at him in the Nimtita railway station.
- On their way to attend the Brigade rally of Sanjukta Morcha, ISF workers attacked TMC activists in Bhangar.
- On 10 March, Mamata Banerjee filed her nomination at the Haldia sub-divisional office headquarters as the TMC candidate for Nandigram. Around 6:15 pm she was injured when she was leaving the Birulia market area of that constituency. She alleged that she was pushed by "four-five people" who manhandled her and slammed the door of her car on her foot. She was taken to SSKM Hospital in Kolkata for treatment. BJP MP Subramanian Swamy made a direct call to her office and inquired about her health before giving a statement wishing her good health. A day after being injured, Mamata Banerjee released a video message urging people and party workers to be calm and exercise restraint. Two days after being admitted, she was discharged at the TMC's multiple requests. She alleged that the attack was orchestrated by Adhikari, who denied the claim. Eyewitness Nitai Maity, a sweet shopkeeper, said "[t]he crowd was already there. But as soon as the car arrived, it was as if the area was flooded with people. There was a bit of pushing. In the meantime, Mamata Banerjee had just opened the front door of the car and had just stepped out. Suddenly there was a push from outside and the door closed. Mamata Banerjee suddenly fell to the ground with a severe leg injury." Medinipur DIG Kunal Agarwal, District Magistrate Bivu Goel, and Superintendent of Police Praveen Prakash went to Birulia Bazar, Nandigram, on Thursday morning to collect eyewitness statements before sending their report to the ECI, whose report on the incident officially ruled out any possibility of foul play and suspended two police officers for being absent from the chief minister's convoy of policemen meant to provide her safety. TMC and BJP workers clashed in front of the DM and the SP. Mamata Banerjee continued to campaign, and the BJP accused of her of trying to gain the voters' sympathy by flaunting her injured leg in an attempt to "[play] the victim card". Some self-proclaimed eyewitnesses claimed that the car door collided with an iron beam embedded on the road, but Firhad Hakim stated that it had no scratches. TMC leaders stated that most of those who were giving eyewitness statements were BJP staff members and asked, "If they are really 'eyewitnesses' then why did they go near the Chief Minister's convoy in that crowd (despite being workers of the BJP)?" Paritosh Jana, TMC President of the Birulia region, said, "The BJP had planted some drunken people into the crowd. They attacked the Chief Minister pretending to have a view of her. They pushed the Supremo when she opened the car's door and was about to step out. The CM did not name any political party. She had only spoken of miscreants. But the BJP is opposing in advance. (They are) giving slogans against the CM. We firmly believe that it is the work of the BJP. It's just like 'the loud voice of a thief's mother' (Bangla version of the proverb 'rogues supplant justice')."
- On 15 March, Mamata Banerjee claimed that at a political rally in Balarampur that goons were entering through the border of Ajodhya Hills area. She accused the BJP of planning to loot votes by sending goons from outside by trains on the eve of the election in order to intimidate voters. On 23 March, she repeated these claims and made demands to seal the border areas. On 26 February, Kolkata TV had reported on BJP workers entering West Bengal from the Hindi Belt. Each of them was given 300 rupees per day. On 29 April, some miscreants with firearms were caught on Kolkata TV cameras in Birbhum. They claimed to be outsiders and said that they were hired to do this for 10,000 rupees.)
- In Baruipur, a TMC activist was killed in clash with members of CPI(M) and ISF.
- Before the first phase of election, an election vehicle was set on fire by two unknown men.
- On 25 March, state BJP president Dilip Ghosh made derogatory comments against Mamata Banerjee from a political rally in Purulia for which he was issued a notice by the ECI. He raised questions on her character due to her unmarried status and stated that if she wants to flaunt her injured leg before the public to gain political dividends, then she should wear bermuda shorts (euphemism for underwear in Indian English) instead of a saree.
- On 27 March, the day of first phase polling, TMC supporters protested outside booth 172 of Majna of the South Contai seat, alleging electronic voting machine malfunction. They alleged that casting a vote for TMC displayed the lotus sign of BJP. Similar allegations came from the closest booth to it.
- Two security personnel were reportedly injured in Satsatmal village, Purba Medinipur district, in a firing and bombing incident during phase 1 of polling.
- A BJP worker's dead body was found in Paschim Medinipur during the first phase of election. The ECI said that they did not find any political motive in his death.
- Three TMC activists were injured in a blast in Bankura during the first phase of elections.
- Three TMC workers were attacked in Boyal of Nandigram. One of them, Rabin Manna, was admitted to SSKM Hospital with serious injuries, and died on 9 April around 4:30 am at SSKM Hospital. On 31 March, Mamata Banerjee said that her car was attacked again in Nandigram a day ago when she visited Manna's house. She later claimed she was informed by Manna's wife that BJP-backed goons were threatening to abduct her daughter and they had to take refuge with a local minority family.
- In Dantan, it was reported that the CPRF prevented people from voting. A complaint was lodged at a local police station that alleged that the CPRF were allowing BJP workers to stay in the booth and cast votes in their name.
- While on an official visit to Bangladesh, Modi visited the birthplace of Harichand Thakur at Orakandi in the Gopalganj district in an attempt to woo the electorally influential Matua community of the state. Mamata Banerjee asserted his trip to Orakandi is a violation of the poll code.
- On 28 March, the ECI stated that 56 bombs were seized from Narendrapur of South 24 Parganas district.
- During the nomination filing by the BJP candidate in Bijpur, gunshots were fired and later clashes broke out between BJP and TMC staff.
- On 30 March, Ashok Dinda, BJP's candidate from Moyna, Purba Medinipur, was attacked and his vehicle vandalised during a campaign. He claimed that hundreds of people wielding lathi and rods hurled stones at his vehicle. Dinda's shoulder was injured.
- On 2 April, the West Bengal Police seized 41 crude bombs in Bhangar.
- During the third phase of polling (6 April), Sujata Mondal, TMC candidate in Arambag, was attacked by some goons at Arandi-I booth 263.
- During the third phase of polling, electronic voting machines and VVPAT machines were found in the house of a TMC politician of North Uluberia. The sector officer was later suspended.
- The TMC accused the BJP of distributing cash coupons among people to lure them to attend Modi's rally.
- In the fourth phase of polling, there were two major instances of violence, both in the Sitalkuchi constituency of the Cooch Behar district. In Pathantuli, a first-time voter, Ananda Barman, was shot and killed by unknown assailants after casting his vote. Both BJP and TMC claimed he was one of their workers, but family members said he was a belonged to BJP. In Sitalkuchi, CISF personnel who were guarding a polling station in Jorepatki shot and killed four Muslim villagers, who they alleged were part of a mob attacking them. They claimed the mob attacked them over rumours the security forces had thrashed a local boy and they fired in self-defence. The families of the deceased claimed the firing was deliberate, and that they were in a queue to vote. Media staff found video footage from local sources, but Special Police Observer Vivek Dubey called it fake without citing any proper reason.
- On 8 April the ECI issued a notice to Adhikari for communal overtones in his 29 March speech in Nandigram, where he derogatorily referred Mamata Banerjee (who is unmarried) as begum ("a married Muslim woman", thereby indicating that she was characterless). In his reply to the ECI notice, Adhikari claimed that he never made any personal attack or derogatory remarks against any political leader, but on 13 April, the ECI issued another warning to him for making derogatory statements in his speech.
- On 12 April, the ECI imposed a 24-hour campaign ban on Mamata Banerjee (effective from 8 pm) for calling out female voters to gherao (or encircle) the CRPF, CAPF and CISF forces on election duty if they "created any obstruction in their right to vote" from a political rally in Cooch Behar district. The next day, the TMC Supremo staged a solitary dharna next to the statue of Mahatma Gandhi at the Mayo Road crossing in Kolkata to protest against the ECI's decision. On the same day, the ECI let Adhikari go with only a warning after he commented that voting in favour of Mamata Banerjee would convert West Bengal into a "mini-Pakistan", which led the TMC to allege that the ECI was operating in a biased manner to benefit BJP.
- On 13 April, the ECI imposed a 48-hour campaign ban on former state BJP president Rahul Sinha for endorsing the killing of Muslims in the Sitalkuchi firing incident, and calling for more Muslims to be killed throughout the state in similar manner.
- On the night before the fifth phase, a picture of the BJP candidate for Ranaghat having lunch with central forces spread on the internet.
- In the fifth phase of polling, in the Shantinagar locality of Bidhannagar, bricks and stones were hurled between TMC and BJP booth workers, leaving eight people injured.
- BJP candidate Gopal Chandra Saha was shot at while campaigning in Maldaha, and was admitted to a hospital.
- In Jalpaiguri, after polling ended, four BJP agents were found with central force personnel carrying electronic voting machines.
- On 24 April, Mamata Banerjee revealed details of the WhatsApp chat of an election observer employed by the ECI with BJP leaders, and said, "The Commission is instructing to arrest our party leaders before the [day of] election. I have WhatsApp chat of everything. Observers have spoken among themselves [about this]." She advised Anubrata Mandal, TMC's Birbhum district president, to go to the courts if the commission wrongfully keeps him under surveillance. The ECI put Mondal under "strict surveillance" for 62 hours from 5 pm on 27 April to 7 am on 30 April.)
- On 29 April, during the eighth phase of voting, crude bombs were hurled near Mahajati Sadan in northern Kolkata.

== Results ==
The election results for 292 constituencies was announced on 2 May 2021 after counting of votes began at 8:00 am (UTC+5:30), while the results for 2 constituencies was delayed until 3 October.

215	1	77	1
AITC	GJM(T)	BJP	AISF

Vote share by alliance
1. AITC+ (48.0%)
2. NDA (38.0%)
3. SM (10.0%)
4. NOTA (1.08%)
5. Others (2.88%)

=== Results by party ===
- Declared on 2 May 2021:

Party/alliance		Popular vote			Seats		
Party/alliance		Votes	%	±pp	Contested	Won	+/−
AITC+	All India Trinamool Congress (AITC)	28,735,420	48.02	▲3.11	290	215	▲4
AITC+	Gorkha Janmukti Morcha (GJM) (T) Faction	163,797	0.27	Steady	3	1	▲1
AITC+	Gorkha Janmukti Morcha (GJM) (G) Faction	103,190	0.17	▼	3	0	▼3
AITC+	Total	29,002,407	48.46		294	216	
NDA	Bharatiya Janata Party (BJP)	22,850,710	37.97	▲27.81	293	77	▲74
NDA	All Jharkhand Students Union (AJSU)	61,936	0.1	Steady	1	0	Steady
NDA	Total	22,912,646	37.98		294	77	
Sanjukta Morcha							
Sanjukta Morcha	Communist Party of India (Marxist) (CPM)	2,837,276	4.73	▼15.02	138	0	▼26
Sanjukta Morcha	Indian National Congress (INC)	1,757,131	2.93	▼9.32	91	0	▼44
Sanjukta Morcha	All India Secular Front (AISF)	813,489	1.36	Steady	32	1	▲1
Sanjukta Morcha	All India Forward Bloc (AIFB)	318,932	0.53	▼	21	0	▼3
Sanjukta Morcha	Revolutionary Socialist Party (RSP)	126,121	0.21	▼	10	0	▼2
Sanjukta Morcha	Communist Party of India (CPI)	118,655	0.20	▼	10	0	▼1
Sanjukta Morcha	Total	5,971,604	10.04		294	1	
NOTA		646,829	1.08				
Total		59,935,989	100.0		294		±0
Valid votes		59,935,989	99.84				
Invalid votes		96,674	0.16				
Votes cast / turnout		60,032,663	82.32				
Abstentions		12,891,443	17.68				
Registered voters		73,414,746 (Note: Apart from these, there were 128 overseas electors. Among them, 2 electors exercised their franchise.)					

- Declared on 3 October 2021:

Political parties	Results of remaining Constituencies (declared on 3 October)				Complete results of 294 Constituencies					
Political parties	Popular vote		Seats		Popular vote			Seats		
Political parties	Votes	%	Contested	Won	Votes	%	±pp	Contested	Won	+/−
AITC	232,861	60.19	2	2	28,968,281	48.02	▲	290	215	▲4
BJP	54,764	14.16	2	0	22,905,474	37.97	▲	293	77	▲74
CPI(M)	6,158	1.59	1	0	2,843,434	4.71	▼	139	0	▼26
INC	70,038	18.10	1	0	1,827,169	3.03	▼	92	0	▼44
RSP	9,067	2.34	1	0	135,188	0.22	▼	11	0	▼2
NOTA	7,621	1.97			654,449	1.08				
Total	386,845	100.00	2		60,322,834	100.00		294		
Valid votes	386,845	99.95			60,322,834	99.84				
Invalid votes	183	0.05			96,857	0.16				
Votes cast / turnout	387,028	78.88			60,419,691	82.30				
Abstentions	103,614	21.12			12,995,057	17.70				
Registered voters	490,642	100.00			73,414,746	100.00				

=== Results by polling phase ===
Phase	Seats			
Phase	Seats	TMC+	NDA	SDA
First	30	18	12	0
Second	30	19	11	0
Third	31	27	4	0
Fourth	44	31	12	1
Fifth	45	28	17	0
Sixth	43	35	8	0
Seventh	34	25	9	0
Eighth	35	31	4	0
Later (Note: In Samserganj and Jangipur, elections were held on 30 September 2021.)	2	2	0	0
Total	294	216	77	1

=== Results by region ===
Region	District	Seats						
Region	District	Seats	AITC+		NDA		SDA	
Region	District	Seats	Won	+/-	Won	+/-	Won	+/-
North Bengal	Cooch Behar	9	2	▼6	7	▲7	0	▼1
North Bengal	Alipurduar	5	0	▼4	5	▲4	0	Steady
North Bengal	Jalpaiguri	7	3	▼3	4	▲4	0	▼1
North Bengal	Kalimpong	1	1	▲1	0	▼1	0	Steady
North Bengal	Darjeeling	5	0	Steady	5	▲3	0	▼3
North Bengal	Uttar Dinajpur	9	7	▲3	2	▲2	0	▼5
North Bengal	Dakshin Dinajpur	6	3	▲1	3	▲3	0	▼4
North Bengal	Malda	12	8	▲8	4	▲3	0	▼11
Total		54	24	Steady	30	▲25	0	▼25
South Bengal	Murshidabad	22	20	▲16	2	▲2	0	▼18
South Bengal	Nadia	17	8	▼5	9	▲9	0	▼4
South Bengal	North 24 Parganas	33	28	▲1	5	▲5	0	▼6
South Bengal	South 24 Parganas	31	30	▲1	0	Steady	1	▼1
South Bengal	Kolkata	11	11	Steady	0	Steady	0	Steady
South Bengal	Howrah	16	16	▲1	0	Steady	0	▼1
South Bengal	Hooghly	18	14	▼2	4	▲4	0	▼2
South Bengal	Purba Medinipur	16	9	▼4	7	▲7	0	▼3
South Bengal	Paschim Medinipur	15	13	Steady	2	▲1	0	▼1
South Bengal	Jhargram	4	4	Steady	0	Steady	0	Steady
Total		183	153	▲8	29	▲28	1	▼36
Rarh Banga	Purulia	9	3	▼4	6	▲6	0	▼2
Rarh Banga	Bankura	12	4	▼3	8	▲8	0	▼5
Rarh Banga	Purba Bardhaman	16	16	▲2	0	Steady	0	▼2
Rarh Banga	Paschim Bardhaman	9	6	▲1	3	▲3	0	▼4
Rarh Banga	Birbhum	11	10	▲1	1	▲1	0	▼2
Total		57	39	▼3	18	▲18	0	▼15
Total		294	216	▲5 (Note: Trinamool Congress won 215 seats and its ally Gorkha Janmukti Morcha (Tamang) won 1 seat of Kalimpong.)	77	▲71 (Note: NDA won 6 seats in 2016: BJP won 3 and its ally GJM won 3. However, prior to the 2021 election, GJM allied with the Trinamool Congress.)	1	▼76

=== Results by constituency ===
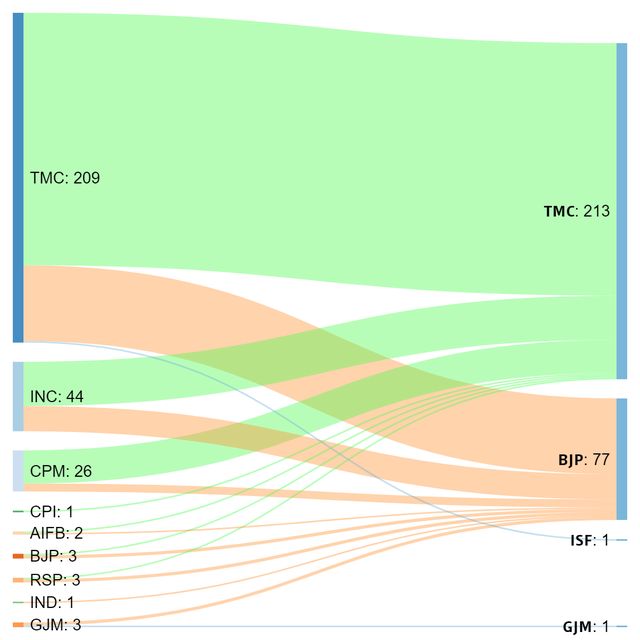
Sankey diagram of 2021

District	Constituency		Winner				Runner-up				Margin	
District	Constituency		Candidate	Party	Votes	%	Candidate	Party	Votes	%	Votes	%
Cooch Behar	1	Mekliganj	Paresh Chandra Adhikary	AITC	99,338	49.98	Dadhiram Ray	BJP	84,653	42.59	14,685	7.39
Cooch Behar	2	Mathabhanga	Sushil Barman	BJP	1,13,249	52.87	Girindra Nath Barman	AITC	87,115	40.67	26,134	12.20
Cooch Behar	3	Coochbehar Uttar	Sukumar Roy	BJP	1,20,483	49.40	Binay Krishna Barman	AITC	1,05,868	43.40	14,615	6.00
Cooch Behar	4	Coochbehar Dakshin	Nikhil Ranjan Dey	BJP	91,560	46.83	Avijit De Bhowmik	AITC	86,629	44.31	4,931	2.52
Cooch Behar	5	Sitalkuchi	Baren Chandra Barman	BJP	1,24,955	50.80	Partha Pratim Ray	AITC	1,07,140	43.56	17,815	7.24
Cooch Behar	6	Sitai	Jagadish Chandra Barma Basunia	AITC	1,17,908	49.42	Dipak Kumar Roy	BJP	1,07,796	45.18	10,112	4.24
Cooch Behar	7	Dinhata	Nisith Pramanik	BJP	1,16,035	47.60	Udayan Guha	AITC	1,15,978	47.58	57	0.02
Cooch Behar	8	Natabari	Mihir Goswami	BJP	1,11,743	51.45	Rabindra Nath Ghosh	AITC	88,303	40.66	23,440	10.79
Cooch Behar	9	Tufanganj	Malati Rava Roy	BJP	1,14,503	54.69	Pranab Kumar Dey	AITC	83,305	39.79	31,198	14.90
Alipurduar	10	Kumargram	Manoj Kumar Oraon	BJP	1,11,974	48.16	Leos Kujur (Urao)	AITC	1,00,973	43.43	11,001	4.73
Alipurduar	11	Kalchini	Bishal Lama	BJP	1,03,104	52.65	Passang Lama	AITC	74,528	38.06	28,576	14.59
Alipurduar	12	Alipurduars	Suman Kanjilal	BJP	1,07,333	48.19	Sourav Chakraborty (Ghutis)	AITC	91,326	41.00	16,007	7.19
Alipurduar	13	Falakata	Dipak Barman	BJP	1,02,993	46.71	Subhash Chandra Roy	AITC	99,003	44.90	3,990	1.81
Alipurduar	14	Madarihat	Manoj Tigga	BJP	90,718	54.35	Rajesh Lakra	AITC	61,033	36.56	29,685	17.79
Jalpaiguri	15	Dhupguri	Bishnu Pada Ray	BJP	1,04,688	45.65	Mitali Roy	AITC	1,00,333	43.75	4,355	1.90
Jalpaiguri	16	Maynaguri	Kaushik Roy	BJP	1,15,306	48.84	Manoj Roy	AITC	1,03,395	43.79	11,911	5.05
Jalpaiguri	17	Jalpaiguri	Dr. Pradip Kumar Barma	AITC	95,668	42.34	Soujit Singha (Piku)	BJP	94,727	41.93	941	0.41
Jalpaiguri	18	Rajganj	Khageswar Roy	AITC	1,04,641	48.50	Supen Roy	BJP	88,868	41.19	15,773	7.31
Jalpaiguri	19	Dabgram-Fulbari	Sikha Chatterjee	BJP	1,29,088	49.85	Goutam Deb	AITC	1,01,495	39.19	27,593	10.66
Jalpaiguri	20	Mal	Bulu Chik Baraik	AITC	99,086	46.46	Mahesh Bagey	BJP	93,621	43.90	5,465	2.56
Jalpaiguri	21	Nagrakata	Puna Bhengra	BJP	94,722	49.55	Joseph Munda	AITC	71,247	37.27	23,475	12.28
Kalimpong	22	Kalimpong	Ruden Sada Lepcha	IND	58,206	37.59	Suva Pradhan	BJP	54,336	35.09	3,870	2.50
Darjeeling	23	Darjeeling	Neeraj Tamang Zimba	BJP	68,907	40.88	Keshav Raj Sharma	IND	47,631	28.26	21,276	12.62
Darjeeling	24	Kurseong	Bishnu Prasad Sharma	BJP	73,475	41.86	Tshering Lama	IND	57,960	33.02	15,515	8.84
Darjeeling	25	Matigara-Naxalbari	Anandamay Barman	BJP	1,39,785	58.10	Rajen Sundas	AITC	68,937	28.65	70,848	29.45
Darjeeling	26	Siliguri	Sankar Ghosh	BJP	89,370	50.03	Dr. Omprakash Mishra	AITC	53,784	30.11	35,586	19.92
Darjeeling	27	Phansidewa	Durga Murmu	BJP	1,05,651	50.89	Chhotan Kisku	AITC	77,940	37.55	27,711	13.34
Uttar Dinajpur	28	Chopra	Hamidul Rahaman	AITC	1,24,923	61.20	Md. Shahin Akhter	BJP	60,018	29.40	64,905	31.80
Uttar Dinajpur	29	Islampur	Abdul Karim Chowdhary	AITC	1,00,131	58.91	Saumyaroop Mandal	BJP	62,691	36.88	37,440	22.03
Uttar Dinajpur	30	Goalpokhar	Md. Ghulam Rabbani	AITC	1,05,649	65.40	Md. Ghulam Sarwar	BJP	32,135	19.89	73,514	45.51
Uttar Dinajpur	31	Chakulia	Azad Minhajul Arfin	AITC	86,311	49.78	Sachin Prasad	BJP	52,474	30.26	33,837	19.52
Uttar Dinajpur	32	Karandighi	Goutam Paul	AITC	1,16,594	54.70	Subhas Chandra Sinha	BJP	79,968	37.52	36,626	17.18
Uttar Dinajpur	33	Hemtabad	Satyajit Barman	AITC	1,16,425	52.14	Chandima Roy	BJP	89,210	39.95	27,215	12.19
Uttar Dinajpur	34	Kaliaganj	Soumen Roy	BJP	1,16,768	48.71	Tapan Deb Singha	AITC	94,948	39.61	21,820	9.10
Uttar Dinajpur	35	Raiganj	Krishna Kalyani	BJP	79,775	49.44	Agarwal Kanaia Lal	AITC	59,027	36.58	20,748	12.86
Uttar Dinajpur	36	Itahar	Mosaraf Hussen	AITC	1,14,645	59.10	Amit Kumar Kundu	BJP	70,670	36.43	43,975	22.67
Dakshin Dinajpur	37	Kushmandi	Rekha Roy	AITC	89,968	48.88	Ranjit Kumar Roy	BJP	77,384	42.04	12,584	6.84
Dakshin Dinajpur	38	Kumarganj	Toraf Hossain Mandal	AITC	89,763	52.52	Manas Sarkar	BJP	60,396	35.33	29,367	17.19
Dakshin Dinajpur	39	Balurghat	Ashok Kumar Lahiri	BJP	72,129	47.42	Sekhar Dasgupta	AITC	58,693	38.59	13,436	8.83
Dakshin Dinajpur	40	Tapan	Budhrai Tudu	BJP	84,381	45.29	Kalpana Kisku	AITC	82,731	44.41	1,650	0.88
Dakshin Dinajpur	41	Gangarampur	Satyendra Nath Ray	BJP	88,724	46.82	Goutam Das	AITC	84,132	44.40	4,592	2.42
Dakshin Dinajpur	42	Harirampur	Biplab Mitra	AITC	96,131	51.23	Nilanjan Roy	BJP	73,459	39.15	22,672	12.08
Malda	43	Habibpur	Joyel Murmu	BJP	94,075	47.52	Prodip Baskey	AITC	74,558	37.66	19,517	9.86
Malda	44	Gazole	Chinmoy Deb Barman	BJP	1,00,655	45.50	Basanti Barman	AITC	98,857	44.69	1,798	0.81
Malda	45	Chanchal	Nihar Ranjan Ghosh	AITC	1,15,966	58.08	Dipankar Ram (Bankat)	BJP	48,628	24.35	67,338	33.73
Malda	46	Harischandrapur	Tajmul Hossain	AITC	1,22,527	60.31	Md. Matibur Rahaman	BJP	45,054	22.18	77,473	38.13
Malda	47	Malatipur	Abdur Rahim Boxi	AITC	1,26,157	68.02	Mousumi Das	BJP	34,208	18.44	91,949	49.58
Malda	48	Ratua	Samar Mukherjee	AITC	1,30,674	59.63	Abishek Singhania	BJP	55,024	25.11	75,650	34.52
Malda	49	Manikchak	Sabitri Mitra	AITC	1,10,234	53.26	Gour Chandra Mandal	BJP	76,356	36.89	33,878	16.37
Malda	50	Maldaha	Gopal Chandra Saha	BJP	93,398	45.23	Ujjwal Kumar Chowdhury	AITC	77,942	37.75	15,456	7.48
Malda	51	English Bazar	Sreerupa Mitra Chaudhury	BJP	1,07,755	49.96	Krishnendu Narayan Choudhury	AITC	87,656	40.64	20,099	9.32
Malda	52	Mothabari	Yeasmin Sabina	AITC	97,397	59.70	Shyamchand Ghosh	BJP	40,824	25.02	56,573	34.68
Malda	53	Sujapur	Md Abdul Ghani	AITC	1,52,445	73.44	Isha Khan Choudhury	INC	22,282	10.73	1,30,163	62.71
Malda	54	Baisnabnagar	Chandana Sarkar	AITC	83,061	39.81	Swadhin Kumar Sarkar	BJP	80,590	38.62	2,471	1.19
Murshidabad	55	Farakka	Manirul Islam	AITC	1,02,319	54.89	Ghosh Hemanta	BJP	42,374	22.73	59,945	32.16
Murshidabad	56	Samserganj	Amirul Islam	AITC	96,417	51.13	Zaidur Rahaman	INC	70,038	37.14	26,379	13.99
Murshidabad	57	Suti	Emani Biswas	AITC	1,27,351	58.87	Koushik Das	BJP	56,650	26.19	70,701	32.68
Murshidabad	58	Jangipur	Zakir Hossain	AITC	1,36,444	68.82	Sujit Das	BJP	43,964	22.17	92,480	46.65
Murshidabad	59	Raghunathganj	Akhruzzaman	AITC	1,26,834	66.59	Golam Modaswer	BJP	28,521	14.97	98,313	51.62
Murshidabad	60	Sagardighi	Subrata Saha	AITC	95,189	50.95	Khatun Mafuja	BJP	44,983	24.08	50,206	26.87
Murshidabad	61	Lalgola	Ali Mohammad	AITC	1,07,860	56.64	Abu Hena	INC	47,153	24.76	60,707	31.88
Murshidabad	62	Bhagawangola	Idris Ali	AITC	1,53,795	68.05	Md. Kamal Hossain	CPI(M)	47,787	21.15	1,06,008	46.90
Murshidabad	63	Raninagar	Abdul Soumik Hossain	AITC	1,34,957	60.79	Firoza Begam	INC	55,255	24.89	79,702	35.90
Murshidabad	64	Murshidabad	Gouri Sankar Ghosh	BJP	95,967	41.86	Shaoni Singha Roy	AITC	93,476	40.78	2,491	1.08
Murshidabad	65	Nabagram	Kanai Chandra Mondal	AITC	1,00,455	48.18	Mohan Halder	BJP	64,922	31.14	35,533	17.04
Murshidabad	66	Khargram	Ashis Marjit	AITC	93,255	50.15	Aditya Moulik	BJP	60,682	32.64	32,573	17.51
Murshidabad	67	Burwan	Jiban Krishna Saha	AITC	81,890	46.32	Amiya Kumar Das	BJP	79,141	44.76	2,749	1.56
Murshidabad	68	Kandi	Apurba Sarkar (David)	AITC	95,399	51.16	Goutam Roy	BJP	57,319	30.74	38,080	20.42
Murshidabad	69	Bharatpur	Humayun Kabir	AITC	96,226	50.90	Iman Kalyan Mukherjee	BJP	53,143	28.11	43,083	22.79
Murshidabad	70	Rejinagar	Rabiul Alam Chowdhury	AITC	1,18,494	56.31	Arabinda Biswas	BJP	50,226	23.87	68,268	32.44
Murshidabad	71	Beldanga	Hasanuzzaman Sk	AITC	1,12,862	55.19	Sumit Ghosh	BJP	59,030	28.86	53,832	26.33
Murshidabad	72	Baharampur	Subrata Maitra (Kanchan)	BJP	89,340	45.21	Naru Gopal Mukherjee	AITC	62,488	31.62	26,852	13.59
Murshidabad	73	Hariharpara	Niamot Sheikh	AITC	1,02,660	47.51	Mir Alamgir (Palash)	INC	88,594	41.00	14,066	6.51
Murshidabad	74	Nowda	Sahina Momtaz Khan	AITC	1,17,684	58.16	Anupam Mandal	BJP	43,531	21.51	74,153	36.65
Murshidabad	75	Domkal	Jafikul Islam	AITC	1,27,671	56.45	Md. Mostafijur Rahaman (Rana)	CPI(M)	80,442	35.57	47,229	20.88
Murshidabad	76	Jalangi	Abdur Razzak	AITC	1,23,840	55.74	Saiful Islam Molla	CPI(M)	44,564	20.06	79,276	35.68
Nadia	77	Karimpur	Bimalendu Sinha Roy	AITC	1,10,911	50.07	Samarendranath Ghosh	BJP	87,336	39.43	23,575	10.64
Nadia	78	Tehatta	Tapas Kumar Saha	AITC	97,848	44.86	Ashutosh Paul	BJP	90,933	41.69	6,915	3.17
Nadia	79	Palashipara	Dr. Manik Bhattacharya	AITC	1,10,274	54.22	Bibhash Chandra Mandal	BJP	58,938	28.98	51,336	25.24
Nadia	80	Kaliganj	Nasiruddin Ahamed (Lal)	AITC	1,11,696	53.35	Abhijit Ghosh	BJP	64,709	30.91	46,987	22.44
Nadia	81	Nakashipara	Kallol Khan	AITC	1,04,812	50.01	Santanu Dey	BJP	83,541	39.86	21,271	10.15
Nadia	82	Chapra	Rukbanur Rahman	AITC	73,866	34.65	Jeber Sekh	IND	61,748	28.97	12,118	5.68
Nadia	83	Krishnanagar Uttar	Mukul Roy	BJP	1,09,357	54.19	Koushani Mukherjee	AITC	74,268	36.80	35,089	17.39
Nadia	84	Nabadwip	Pundarikakshya Saha	AITC	1,02,170	48.52	Sidhartha Shankar Naskar	BJP	83,599	39.70	18,571	8.82
Nadia	85	Krishnanagar Dakshin	Ujjal Biswas	AITC	91,738	46.88	Mahadev Sarkar	BJP	82,433	42.13	9,305	4.75
Nadia	86	Santipur	Jagannath Sarkar	BJP	1,09,722	49.94	Ajoy Dey	AITC	93,844	42.72	15,878	7.22
Nadia	87	Ranaghat Uttar Paschim	Parthasarathi Chatterjee	BJP	1,13,637	50.91	Sankar Singha	AITC	90,509	40.55	23,128	10.36
Nadia	88	Krishnaganj	Ashis Kumar Biswas	BJP	1,17,668	50.73	Dr. Tapas Mandal	AITC	96,391	41.56	21,277	9.17
Nadia	89	Ranaghat Uttar Purba	Ashim Biswas	BJP	1,16,786	54.39	Samir Kumar Poddar	AITC	85,004	39.59	31,782	14.80
Nadia	90	Ranaghat Dakshin	Mukut Mani Adhikari	BJP	1,19,260	49.34	Barnali Dey Roy	AITC	1,02,745	42.51	16,515	6.83
Nadia	91	Chakdaha	Bankim Chandra Ghosh	BJP	99,368	46.86	Subhankar Singha (Jishu)	AITC	87,688	41.35	11,680	5.51
Nadia	92	Kalyani	Ambika Roy	BJP	97,026	44.04	Aniruddha Biswas	AITC	94,820	43.03	2,206	1.01
Nadia	93	Haringhata	Asim Kumar Sarkar	BJP	97,666	46.31	Nilima Nag (Mallick)	AITC	82,466	39.11	15,200	7.20
North 24 Parganas	94	Bagda	Biswajit Das	BJP	1,08,111	49.41	Paritosh Kumar Saha	AITC	98,319	44.94	9,792	4.47
North 24 Parganas	95	Bangaon Uttar	Ashok Kirtania	BJP	97,761	47.65	Shyamal Roy	AITC	87,273	42.54	10,488	5.11
North 24 Parganas	96	Bangaon Dakshin	Swapan Majumder	BJP	97,828	47.07	Alo Rani Sarkar	AITC	95,824	46.11	2,004	0.96
North 24 Parganas	97	Gaighata	Subrata Thakur	BJP	1,00,808	47.27	Narottam Biswas	AITC	91,230	42.78	9,578	4.49
North 24 Parganas	98	Swarupnagar	Bina Mondal	AITC	99,784	47.11	Brindaban Sarkar	BJP	64,984	30.68	34,800	16.43
North 24 Parganas	99	Baduria	Abdur Rahim Quazi	AITC	1,09,701	51.53	Sukalyan Baidya	BJP	53,257	25.02	56,444	26.51
North 24 Parganas	100	Habra	Jyoti Priya Mallick	AITC	90,533	44.34	Rahul (Biswajit) Sinha	BJP	86,692	42.46	3,841	1.88
North 24 Parganas	101	Ashoknagar	Narayan Goswami	AITC	93,587	43.18	Tanuja Chakraborty	BJP	70,055	32.32	23,532	10.86
North 24 Parganas	102	Amdanga	Rafiqur Rahaman	AITC	88,935	42.00	Joydev Manna	BJP	63,455	29.97	25,480	12.03
North 24 Parganas	103	Bijpur	Subodh Adhikary	AITC	66,625	47.90	Subhranshu Roy	BJP	53,278	38.30	13,347	9.60
North 24 Parganas	104	Naihati	Partha Bhowmick	AITC	77,753	49.69	Phalguni Patra	BJP	58,898	37.64	18,855	12.05
North 24 Parganas	105	Bhatpara	Pawan Kumar Singh	BJP	57,244	53.40	Jitendra Shaw (Jitu)	AITC	43,557	40.63	13,687	12.77
North 24 Parganas	106	Jagatdal	Somenath Shyam Ichini	AITC	87,030	48.01	Arindam Bhattacharya	BJP	68,666	37.88	18,364	10.13
North 24 Parganas	107	Noapara	Manju Basu	AITC	94,203	48.90	Sunil Singh	BJP	67,493	35.04	26,710	13.86
North 24 Parganas	108	Barrackpur	Raju Chakraborty (Raj)	AITC	68,887	46.47	Chandramani Shukla	BJP	59,665	40.25	9,222	6.22
North 24 Parganas	109	Khardaha	Kajal Sinha	AITC	89,807	49.04	Silbhadra Datta	BJP	61,667	33.67	28,140	15.37
North 24 Parganas	110	Dum Dum Uttar	Chandrima Bhattacharya	AITC	95,465	44.79	Dr. Archana Majumdar	BJP	66,966	31.42	28,499	13.37
North 24 Parganas	111	Panihati	Nirmal Ghosh	AITC	86,495	49.61	Sanmoy Bandyopadhyay	BJP	61,318	35.17	25,177	14.44
North 24 Parganas	112	Kamarhati	Madan Mitra	AITC	73,845	51.17	Anindya Banerjee	BJP	38,437	26.64	35,408	24.53
North 24 Parganas	113	Baranagar	Tapas Roy	AITC	85,615	53.42	Parno Mittra	BJP	50,468	31.49	35,147	21.93
North 24 Parganas	114	Dum Dum	Bratya Basu	AITC	87,999	47.48	Bimalshankar Nanda	BJP	61,268	33.06	26,731	14.42
North 24 Parganas	115	Rajarhat New Town	Tapash Chatterjee	AITC	1,27,374	54.22	Bhaskar Roy S/o - Dulal Roy	BJP	70,942	30.20	56,432	24.02
North 24 Parganas	116	Bidhannagar	Sujit Bose	AITC	75,912	46.85	Sabya Sachi Dutta	BJP	67,915	41.91	7,997	4.94
North 24 Parganas	117	Rajarhat Gopalpur	Aditi Munshi	AITC	87,650	49.04	Samik Bhattacharya	BJP	62,354	34.89	25,296	14.15
North 24 Parganas	118	Madhyamgram	Rathin Ghosh	AITC	1,12,741	48.93	Rajasree Rajbanshi	BJP	64,615	28.04	48,126	20.89
North 24 Parganas	119	Barasat	Chiranjeet Chakrabarti	AITC	1,04,431	46.27	Sankar Chatterjee	BJP	80,648	35.73	23,783	10.54
North 24 Parganas	120	Deganga	Rahima Mondal	AITC	1,00,105	46.70	Karim Ali	AISF	67,568	31.52	32,537	15.18
North 24 Parganas	121	Haroa	Islam Sk Nurul (Haji)	AITC	1,30,398	57.34	Kutubuddin Fathe	AISF	49,420	21.73	80,978	35.61
North 24 Parganas	122	Minakhan	Usha Rani Mondal	AITC	1,09,818	51.72	Jayanta Mondal	BJP	53,988	25.42	55,830	26.30
North 24 Parganas	123	Sandeshkhali	Sukumar Mahata	AITC	1,12,450	54.64	Dr. Bhaskar Sardar	BJP	72,765	35.36	39,685	19.28
North 24 Parganas	124	Basirhat Dakshin	Dr. Saptarshi Banerjee	AITC	1,15,873	49.15	Tarak Nath Ghosh	BJP	91,405	38.77	24,468	10.38
North 24 Parganas	125	Basirhat Uttar	Rafikul Islam Mondal	AITC	1,37,216	57.55	Md Baijid Amin	AISF	47,865	20.08	89,351	37.47
North 24 Parganas	126	Hingalganj	Debes Mandal	AITC	1,04,706	53.78	Nemai Das	BJP	79,790	40.98	24,916	12.80
South 24 Parganas	127	Gosaba	Jayanta Naskar	AITC	1,05,723	53.99	Barun Pramanik (Chitta)	BJP	82,014	41.88	23,709	12.11
South 24 Parganas	128	Basanti	Shyamal Mondal	AITC	1,11,453	52.10	Ramesh Majhi	BJP	60,811	28.43	50,642	23.67
South 24 Parganas	129	Kultali	Ganesh Chandra Mondal	AITC	1,17,238	51.57	Mintu Halder	BJP	70,061	30.82	47,177	20.75
South 24 Parganas	130	Patharpratima	Samir Kumar Jana	AITC	1,20,181	51.85	Asit Kumar Haldar	BJP	98,047	42.30	22,134	9.55
South 24 Parganas	131	Kakdwip	Manturam Pakhira	AITC	1,14,493	52.14	Dipankar Jana	BJP	89,191	40.62	25,302	11.52
South 24 Parganas	132	Sagar	Bankim Chandra Hazra	AITC	1,29,000	53.96	Kamila Bikash	BJP	99,154	41.48	29,846	12.48
South 24 Parganas	133	Kulpi	Jogaranjan Halder	AITC	96,577	50.01	Pranab Kumar Mallik	BJP	62,759	32.50	33,818	17.51
South 24 Parganas	134	Raidighi	Aloke Jaldata	AITC	1,15,707	48.47	Santanu Bapuli	BJP	80,139	33.57	35,568	14.90
South 24 Parganas	135	Mandirbazar	Joydeb Halder	AITC	95,834	48.04	Dilip Kumar Jatua	BJP	72,342	36.26	23,492	11.78
South 24 Parganas	136	Jaynagar	Biswanath Das	AITC	1,04,952	51.85	Rabin Sardar	BJP	66,269	32.74	38,683	19.11
South 24 Parganas	137	Baruipur Purba	Bivas Sardar (Vobo)	AITC	1,23,243	54.75	Chandan Mondal	BJP	73,602	32.70	49,641	22.05
South 24 Parganas	138	Canning Paschim	Paresh Ram Das	AITC	1,11,059	50.86	Arnab Roy	BJP	75,816	34.72	35,243	16.14
South 24 Parganas	139	Canning Purba	Saokat Molla	AITC	1,22,301	52.54	Gazi Shahabuddin Siraji	AISF	69,294	29.77	53,007	22.77
South 24 Parganas	140	Baruipur Paschim	Biman Banerjee	AITC	1,21,006	57.27	Debopam Chattopadhyaya (Babu)	BJP	59,096	27.97	61,910	29.30
South 24 Parganas	141	Magrahat Purba	Namita Saha	AITC	1,10,945	53.82	Chandan Kumar Naskar	BJP	56,866	27.58	54,079	26.24
South 24 Parganas	142	Magrahat Paschim	Gias Uddin Molla	AITC	97,006	49.93	Dhurjati Saha (Manas)	BJP	50,065	25.77	46,941	24.16
South 24 Parganas	143	Diamond Harbour	Pannalal Halder	AITC	98,478	43.69	Dipak Kumar Halder	BJP	81,482	36.15	16,996	7.54
South 24 Parganas	144	Falta	Sankar Kumar Naskar	AITC	1,17,179	56.35	Bidhan Parui	BJP	76,405	36.75	40,774	19.60
South 24 Parganas	145	Satgachhia	Mohan Chandra Naskar	AITC	1,18,635	50.37	Chandan Pal	BJP	95,317	40.47	23,318	9.90
South 24 Parganas	146	Bishnupur	Dilip Mondal	AITC	1,36,509	57.46	Agniswar Naskar	BJP	77,677	32.70	58,832	24.76
South 24 Parganas	147	Sonarpur Dakshin	Arundhuti Maitra (Lovely)	AITC	1,09,222	46.92	Anjana Basu	BJP	83,041	35.67	26,181	11.25
South 24 Parganas	148	Bhangar	Md. Nawsad Siddique	AISF	1,09,237	45.10	Karim Rezaul	AITC	83,086	34.31	26,151	10.79
South 24 Parganas	149	Kasba	Ahmed Javed Khan	AITC	1,21,372	54.39	Dr. Indranil Khan	BJP	57,750	25.88	63,622	28.51
South 24 Parganas	150	Jadavpur	Debabrata Majumdar (Malay)	AITC	98,100	45.54	Dr. Sujan Chakraborty	CPI(M)	59,231	27.50	38,869	18.04
South 24 Parganas	151	Sonarpur Uttar	Firdousi Begum	AITC	1,19,957	49.88	Ranjan Baidya	BJP	83,867	34.87	36,090	15.01
South 24 Parganas	152	Tollyganj	Aroop Biswas	AITC	1,01,440	51.40	Babul Supriyo	BJP	51,360	26.02	50,080	25.38
South 24 Parganas	153	Behala Purba	Ratna Chatterjee	AITC	1,10,968	50.01	Payel Sarkar	BJP	73,540	33.15	37,428	16.86
South 24 Parganas	154	Behala Paschim	Partha Chatterjee	AITC	1,14,778	49.51	Srabanti Chatterjee	BJP	63,894	27.56	50,884	21.95
South 24 Parganas	155	Maheshtala	Dulal Chandra Das	AITC	1,24,008	56.38	Umesh Das	BJP	66,059	30.03	57,949	26.35
South 24 Parganas	156	Budge Budge	Ashok Kumar Deb	AITC	1,22,357	56.41	Dr. Tarun Kumar Adak	BJP	77,643	35.80	44,714	20.61
South 24 Parganas	157	Metiaburuz	Abdul Khaleque Molla	AITC	1,51,066	76.85	Ramjit Prasad	BJP	31,462	16.00	1,19,604	60.85
Kolkata	158	Kolkata Port	Firhad Hakim	AITC	1,05,543	69.23	Awadh Kishore Gupta	BJP	36,989	24.26	68,554	44.97
Kolkata	159	Bhabanipur	Sobhandeb Chattopadhyay	AITC	73,505	57.71	Rudranil Ghosh	BJP	44,786	35.16	28,719	22.55
Kolkata	160	Rashbehari	Debasish Kumar	AITC	65,704	52.79	Lt. Gen. (Dr.) Subrata Saha	BJP	44,290	35.59	21,414	17.20
Kolkata	161	Ballygunge	Subrata Mukherjee	AITC	1,06,585	70.60	Lokenath Chatterjee	BJP	31,226	20.68	75,359	49.92
Kolkata	162	Chowrangee	Bandyopadhyay Nayna	AITC	70,101	62.87	Devdutta Maji	BJP	24,757	22.20	45,344	40.67
Kolkata	163	Entally	Swarna Kamal Saha	AITC	1,01,709	64.83	Priyanka Tibrewal	BJP	43,452	27.70	58,257	37.13
Kolkata	164	Beleghata	Paresh Paul	AITC	1,03,182	65.10	Kashinath Biswas	BJP	36,042	22.74	67,140	42.36
Kolkata	165	Jorasanko	Vivek Gupta	AITC	52,123	52.67	Meena Devi Purohit	BJP	39,380	39.80	12,743	12.87
Kolkata	166	Shyampukur	Dr. Shashi Panja	AITC	55,785	54.18	Sandipan Biswas	BJP	33,265	32.31	22,520	21.87
Kolkata	167	Maniktala	Sadhan Pande	AITC	67,577	50.82	Kalyan Chaubey	BJP	47,339	35.60	20,238	15.22
Kolkata	168	Kashipur-Belgachhia	Atin Ghosh	AITC	76,182	56.48	Sibaji Sinha Roy	BJP	40,792	30.24	35,390	26.24
Howrah	169	Bally	Rana Chatterjee	AITC	53,347	42.38	Baishali Dalmiya	BJP	47,110	37.43	6,237	4.95
Howrah	170	Howrah Uttar	Gautam Chowdhuri	AITC	71,575	47.81	Umesh Rai	BJP	66,053	44.12	5,522	3.69
Howrah	171	Howrah Madhya	Arup Roy, S/O Late Prabhat Roy	AITC	1,11,554	57.16	Sanjay Singh	BJP	65,007	33.31	46,547	23.85
Howrah	172	Shibpur	Manoj Tiwary	AITC	92,372	50.69	Rathin Chakrabarty	BJP	59,769	32.80	32,603	17.89
Howrah	173	Howrah Dakshin	Nandita Chowdhury	AITC	1,16,839	53.86	Rantidev Sengupta	BJP	66,270	30.55	50,569	23.31
Howrah	174	Sankrail	Priya Paul	AITC	1,11,888	50.37	Probhakar Pandit	BJP	71,461	32.17	40,427	18.20
Howrah	175	Panchla	Gulsan Mullick	AITC	1,04,572	48.19	Mohit Lal Ghanti	BJP	71,821	33.10	32,751	15.09
Howrah	176	Uluberia Purba	Bidesh Ranjan Bose	AITC	86,526	44.83	Pratyush Mandal	BJP	69,400	35.95	17,126	8.88
Howrah	177	Uluberia Uttar	Dr. Nirmal Maji	AITC	91,501	49.25	Chiran Bera	BJP	70,498	37.95	21,003	11.30
Howrah	178	Uluberia Dakshin	Pulak Roy	AITC	1,01,880	50.37	Papia Dey (Adhikary)	BJP	73,442	36.31	28,438	14.06
Howrah	179	Shyampur	Kalipada Mandal	AITC	1,14,804	51.74	Tnusree Chakraborty	BJP	83,293	37.54	31,511	14.20
Howrah	180	Bagnan	Arunava Sen (Raja)	AITC	1,06,042	53.04	Anupam Mallik	BJP	75,922	37.97	30,120	15.07
Howrah	181	Amta	Sukanta Kumar Paul	AITC	1,02,445	49.06	Debtanu Bhattacharya	BJP	76,240	36.51	26,205	12.55
Howrah	182	Udaynarayanpur	Samir Kumar Panja	AITC	1,01,510	51.21	Sumit Ranjan Karar	BJP	87,512	44.15	13,998	7.06
Howrah	183	Jagatballavpur	Sitanath Ghosh	AITC	1,16,562	49.45	Anupam Ghosh	BJP	87,366	37.06	29,196	12.39
Howrah	184	Domjur	Kalyan Ghosh	AITC	1,30,499	52.00	Rajib Banerjee	BJP	87,879	35.01	42,620	16.99
Hooghly	185	Uttarpara	Kanchan Mullick	AITC	93,878	46.96	Prabir Kumar Ghosal	BJP	57,889	28.96	35,989	18.00
Hooghly	186	Sreerampur	Dr. Sudipto Roy	AITC	93,021	49.46	Kabir Shankar Bose	BJP	69,588	37.00	23,433	12.46
Hooghly	187	Champdani	Arindam Guin (Bubai)	AITC	1,00,972	50.20	Dilip Singh	BJP	70,894	35.25	30,078	14.95
Hooghly	188	Singur	Becharam Manna	AITC	1,01,077	48.15	Rabindranath Bhattacharya	BJP	75,154	35.80	25,923	12.35
Hooghly	189	Chandannagar	Indranil Sen	AITC	86,778	47.63	Deepanjan Kumar Guha	BJP	55,749	30.60	31,029	17.03
Hooghly	190	Chunchura	Asit Mazumder (Tapan)	AITC	1,17,104	45.97	Locket Chatterjee	BJP	98,687	38.74	18,417	7.23
Hooghly	191	Balagarh	Manoranjan Bapari	AITC	1,00,364	45.63	Subhas Chandra Haldar	BJP	94,580	43.00	5,784	2.63
Hooghly	192	Pandua	Dr. Ratna De Nag	AITC	1,02,874	45.99	Partha Sharma	BJP	71,016	31.75	31,858	14.24
Hooghly	193	Saptagram	Tapan Dasgupta	AITC	93,328	48.56	Debabrata Biswas	BJP	83,556	43.48	9,772	5.08
Hooghly	194	Chanditala	Swati Khandoker	AITC	1,03,118	49.79	Debashish Dasgupta	BJP	61,771	29.83	41,347	19.96
Hooghly	195	Jangipara	Snehasis Chakraborty	AITC	1,01,885	48.42	Debjit Sarkar	BJP	83,959	39.90	17,926	8.52
Hooghly	196	Haripal	Dr. Karabi Manna	AITC	1,10,215	49.92	Samiran Mitra	BJP	87,143	39.47	23,072	10.45
Hooghly	197	Dhanekhali	Asima Patra	AITC	1,24,776	53.36	Tusar Kumar Majumdar	BJP	94,617	40.46	30,159	12.90
Hooghly	198	Tarakeswar	Ramendu Sinharay	AITC	96,698	46.96	Dr. Swapan Dasgupta	BJP	89,214	43.33	7,484	3.63
Hooghly	199	Pursurah	Biman Ghosh	BJP	1,19,334	53.50	Dilip Yadav	AITC	91,156	40.86	28,178	12.64
Hooghly	200	Arambag	Madhusudan Bag	BJP	1,03,108	46.88	Sujata Mondal	AITC	95,936	43.62	7,172	3.26
Hooghly	201	Goghat	Biswanath Karak	BJP	1,02,227	46.56	Manas Majumdar	AITC	98,080	44.67	4,147	1.89
Hooghly	202	Khanakul	Susanta Ghosh	BJP	1,07,403	49.27	Munsi Nazbul Karim	AITC	94,519	43.36	12,884	5.91
Purba Medinipur	203	Tamluk	Saumen Kumar Mahapatra	AITC	1,08,243	45.86	Hare Krishna Bera	BJP	1,07,450	45.52	793	0.34
Purba Medinipur	204	Panskura Purba	Biplab Roy Chowdhury	AITC	91,213	45.97	Debabrata Pattanayek	BJP	81,553	41.11	9,660	4.86
Purba Medinipur	205	Panskura Paschim	Phiroja Bibi	AITC	1,11,705	47.71	Sintu Senapati	BJP	1,02,816	43.91	8,889	3.80
Purba Medinipur	206	Moyna	Ashoke Dinda	BJP	1,08,109	48.17	Sangram Kumar Dolai	AITC	1,06,849	47.61	1,260	0.56
Purba Medinipur	207	Nandakumar	Sukumar De	AITC	1,08,181	47.60	Adhikary Nilanjan	BJP	1,02,775	45.22	5,406	2.38
Purba Medinipur	208	Mahisadal	Tilak Kumar Chakraborty	AITC	1,01,986	46.49	Biswanath Banerjee	BJP	99,600	45.41	2,386	1.08
Purba Medinipur	209	Haldia	Tapasi Mondal	BJP	1,04,126	47.15	Swapan Naskar	AITC	89,118	40.36	15,008	6.79
Purba Medinipur	210	Nandigram	Adhikari Suvendu	BJP	1,10,764	48.49	Mamata Banerjee	AITC	1,08,808	47.64	1,956	0.85
Purba Medinipur	211	Chandipur	Soham Chakraborty	AITC	1,09,770	49.82	Pulak Kanti Guria	BJP	96,298	43.71	13,472	6.11
Purba Medinipur	212	Patashpur	Uttam Barik	AITC	1,05,299	50.42	Ambujaksha Mahanti	BJP	95,305	45.64	9,994	4.78
Purba Medinipur	213	Kanthi Uttar	Sumita Sinha	BJP	1,13,524	49.70	Tarun Kumar Jana	AITC	1,04,194	45.62	9,330	4.08
Purba Medinipur	214	Bhagabanpur	Rabindranath Maity	BJP	1,21,480	54.56	Ardhendu Maity	AITC	93,931	42.19	27,549	12.37
Purba Medinipur	215	Khejuri	Santanu Pramanik	BJP	1,10,407	51.93	Partha Pratim Das	AITC	92,442	43.48	17,965	8.45
Purba Medinipur	216	Kanthi Dakshin	Arup Kumar Das	BJP	98,477	50.58	Jyotirmoy Kar	AITC	88,184	45.30	10,293	5.28
Purba Medinipur	217	Ramnagar	Akhil Giri	AITC	1,12,622	50.72	Swadesh Ranjan Nayak	BJP	1,00,105	45.08	12,517	5.64
Purba Medinipur	218	Egra	Tarun Kumar Maity	AITC	1,25,763	52.22	Arup Dash	BJP	1,07,272	44.55	18,491	7.67
Paschim Medinipur	219	Dantan	Bikram Chandra Pradhan	AITC	95,209	48.13	Saktipada Nayak	BJP	94,586	47.82	623	0.31
Jhargram	220	Nayagram	Dulal Murmu	AITC	1,00,903	52.46	Bakul Murmu	BJP	78,149	40.63	22,754	11.83
Jhargram	221	Gopiballavpur	Dr. Khagendra Nath Mahata	AITC	1,04,115	52.30	Sanjit Mahata	BJP	80,347	40.36	23,768	11.94
Jhargram	222	Jhargram	Birbaha Hansda	AITC	1,09,493	54.26	Sukhamay Satpathy (Jahar)	BJP	71,253	35.31	38,240	18.95
Paschim Medinipur	223	Keshiary	Paresh Murmu	AITC	1,06,366	50.01	Sonali Murmu Soren	BJP	91,036	42.80	15,330	7.21
Paschim Medinipur	224	Kharagpur Sadar	Hiranmoy Chattopadhyaya	BJP	79,607	46.45	Pradip Sarkar	AITC	75,836	44.25	3,771	2.20
Paschim Medinipur	225	Narayangarh	Atta Surja Kanta	AITC	1,00,894	46.33	Rama Prasad Giri	BJP	98,478	45.23	2,416	1.10
Paschim Medinipur	226	Sabang	Manas Ranjan Bhunia	AITC	1,12,098	47.46	Amulya Maity	BJP	1,02,234	43.28	9,864	4.18
Paschim Medinipur	227	Pingla	Ajit Maity	AITC	1,12,435	49.17	Antara Bhattacharyya	BJP	1,05,779	46.26	6,656	2.91
Paschim Medinipur	228	Kharagpur	Dinen Roy	AITC	1,09,727	54.85	Tapan Bhuya	BJP	73,497	36.74	36,230	18.11
Paschim Medinipur	229	Debra	Humayun Kabir	AITC	95,850	46.79	Bharati Ghosh	BJP	84,624	41.31	11,226	5.48
Paschim Medinipur	230	Daspur	Mamata Bhunia	AITC	1,14,753	51.58	Prasanta Bera	BJP	87,911	39.52	26,842	12.06
Paschim Medinipur	231	Ghatal	Sital Kapat	BJP	1,05,812	46.95	Shankar Dolai	AITC	1,04,846	46.52	966	0.43
Paschim Medinipur	232	Chandrakona	Arup Dhara	AITC	1,21,846	48.87	Sibaram Das	BJP	1,10,565	44.35	11,281	4.52
Paschim Medinipur	233	Garbeta	Uttara Singha (Hazra)	AITC	94,928	45.71	Madan Ruidas	BJP	84,356	40.62	10,572	5.09
Paschim Medinipur	234	Salboni	Srikanta Mahata	AITC	1,26,020	50.57	Rajib Kundu	BJP	93,376	37.47	32,644	13.10
Paschim Medinipur	235	Keshpur	Seuli Saha	AITC	1,16,992	50.81	Pritish Ranjan Kuar	BJP	96,272	41.82	20,720	8.99
Paschim Medinipur	236	Medinipur	June Maliah	AITC	1,21,175	50.72	Samit Kumar Dash	BJP	96,778	40.51	24,397	10.21
Jhargram	237	Binpur	Debnath Hansda	AITC	1,00,277	53.11	Palan Saren	BJP	60,783	32.19	39,494	20.92
Purulia	238	Bandwan	Rajib Lochan Saren	AITC	1,13,337	47.02	Parcy Murmu	BJP	94,506	39.21	18,831	7.81
Purulia	239	Balarampur	Baneswar Mahato	BJP	89,521	45.22	Shantiram Mahato	AITC	89,098	45.01	423	0.21
Purulia	240	Baghmundi	Sushanta Mahato	AITC	75,905	36.79	Ashutosh Mahato	AJSU	61,936	30.02	13,969	6.77
Purulia	241	Joypur	Nara Hari Mahato	BJP	74,380	36.68	Phanibhushan Kumar	INC	62,180	30.67	12,200	6.01
Purulia	242	Purulia	Sudip Kumar Mukherjee	BJP	89,733	43.38	Sujoy Banerjee	AITC	82,715	39.98	7,018	3.40
Purulia	243	Manbazar	Sandhyarani Tudu	AITC	1,03,298	48.33	Gouri Singh Sardar	BJP	87,782	41.07	15,516	7.26
Purulia	244	Kashipur	Kamalakanta Hansda	BJP	92,938	47.69	Swapan Kumar Beltharia	AITC	85,551	43.90	7,387	3.79
Purulia	245	Para	Nadiar Chand Bouri	BJP	87,347	45.02	Umapada Bauri	AITC	83,340	42.95	4,007	2.07
Purulia	246	Raghunathpur	Vivekananda Bauri	BJP	95,770	44.61	Bouri Hazari	AITC	90,332	42.08	5,438	2.53
Bankura	247	Saltora	Bauri Chandana	BJP	91,648	45.28	Sontosh Kumar Mondal	AITC	87,503	43.23	4,145	2.05
Bankura	248	Chhatna	Satyanarayan Mukhopadhyay	BJP	90,233	45.84	Subasish Batabyal	AITC	83,069	42.20	7,164	3.64
Bankura	249	Ranibandh	Jyotsna Mandi	AITC	90,928	43.06	Kshudiram Tudu	BJP	86,989	41.19	3,939	1.87
Bankura	250	Raipur	Mrityunjoy Murmu	AITC	1,01,043	51.96	Sudhanshu Hansda	BJP	81,645	41.98	19,398	9.98
Bankura	251	Taldangra	Arup Chakraborty	AITC	92,026	45.29	Shyamal Kumar Sarkar (Benu)	BJP	79,649	39.20	12,377	6.09
Bankura	252	Bankura	Niladri Sekhar Dana	BJP	95,466	43.79	Sayantika Banerjee	AITC	93,998	43.12	1,468	0.67
Bankura	253	Barjora	Alok Mukherjee	AITC	93,290	42.51	Supriti Chatterjee	BJP	90,021	41.02	3,269	1.49
Bankura	254	Onda	Amarnath Shakha	BJP	1,04,940	46.48	Arup Kumar Khan	AITC	93,389	41.37	11,551	5.11
Bankura	255	Bishnupur	Tanmay Ghosh (Bumba)	BJP	89,689	46.84	Archita Bid	AITC	78,269	40.88	11,420	5.96
Bankura	256	Katulpur	Harakali Protiher	BJP	1,06,022	47.31	Sangeeta Malik	AITC	94,237	42.05	11,785	5.26
Bankura	257	Indus	Nirmal Kumar Dhara	BJP	1,04,936	48.04	Runu Mete	AITC	97,716	44.73	7,220	3.31
Bankura	258	Sonamukhi	Dibakar Gharami	BJP	98,161	47.25	Dr. Shyamal Santra	AITC	87,273	42.01	10,888	5.24
Purba Bardhaman	259	Khandaghosh	Nabin Chandra Bag	AITC	1,04,264	47.85	Bijan Mandal	BJP	83,378	38.26	20,886	9.59
Purba Bardhaman	260	Bardhaman Dakshin	Khokan Das	AITC	91,015	44.32	Sandip Nandi	BJP	82,910	40.38	8,105	3.94
Purba Bardhaman	261	Raina	Shampa Dhara	AITC	1,08,752	47.46	Manik Roy	BJP	90,547	39.51	18,205	7.95
Purba Bardhaman	262	Jamalpur	Alok Kumar Majhi	AITC	96,999	46.93	Balaram Bapari	BJP	79,028	38.24	17,971	8.69
Purba Bardhaman	263	Monteswar	Chowdhury Siddiqullah	AITC	1,05,460	50.45	Saikat Panja	BJP	73,655	35.24	31,805	15.21
Purba Bardhaman	264	Kalna	Deboprasad Bag (Poltu)	AITC	96,073	45.98	Biswajit Kundu	BJP	88,595	42.40	7,478	3.58
Purba Bardhaman	265	Memari	Madhusudan Bhattacharya	AITC	1,04,851	47.92	Bhismadeb Bhattacharya	BJP	81,773	37.37	23,078	10.55
Purba Bardhaman	266	Bardhaman Uttar	Nisith Kumar Malik	AITC	1,11,211	45.97	Radha Kanta Roy	BJP	93,943	38.83	17,268	7.14
Purba Bardhaman	267	Bhatar	Adhikari Mangobinda	AITC	1,08,028	50.44	Mahendranath Kowar	BJP	76,287	35.62	31,741	14.82
Purba Bardhaman	268	Purbasthali Dakshin	Swapan Debnath	AITC	1,05,698	49.08	Rajib Kumar Bhowmick	BJP	88,288	41.00	17,410	8.08
Purba Bardhaman	269	Purbasthali Uttar	Tapan Chatterjee	AITC	92,421	43.52	Gobardhan Das	BJP	85,715	40.37	6,706	3.15
Purba Bardhaman	270	Katwa	Rabindranath Chatterjee	AITC	1,07,894	48.07	Shyama Majumdar	BJP	98,739	43.99	9,155	4.08
Purba Bardhaman	271	Ketugram	Sekh Sahonawez	AITC	1,00,226	46.55	Anadi Ghosh (Mathura)	BJP	87,543	40.66	12,683	5.89
Purba Bardhaman	272	Mangalkot	Apurba Chowdhury (Achal)	AITC	1,07,596	49.51	Rana Protap Goswami	BJP	85,259	39.23	22,337	10.28
Purba Bardhaman	273	Ausgram	Abhedananda Thander	AITC	1,00,392	46.25	Kalita Maji	BJP	88,577	40.80	11,815	5.45
Purba Bardhaman	274	Galsi	Nepal Ghorui	AITC	1,09,504	49.21	Bikash Biswas	BJP	90,242	40.55	19,262	8.66
Paschim Bardhaman	275	Pandabeswar	Narendranath Chakraborty	AITC	73,922	44.99	Kumar Jitendra Tewari	BJP	70,119	42.68	3,803	2.31
Paschim Bardhaman	276	Durgapur Purba	Pradip Mazumdar	AITC	79,303	41.16	Colonel Diptansu Chaudhury	BJP	75,557	39.21	3,746	1.95
Paschim Bardhaman	277	Durgapur Paschim	Lakshman Chandra Ghorui	BJP	91,186	46.31	Biswanath Parial	AITC	76,522	38.86	14,664	7.45
Paschim Bardhaman	278	Raniganj	Tapas Banerjee	AITC	78,164	42.90	Dr. Bijan Mukherjee	BJP	74,608	40.95	3,556	1.95
Paschim Bardhaman	279	Jamuria	Hareram Singh	AITC	71,002	42.59	Tapas Kumar Roy	BJP	62,951	37.76	8,051	4.83
Paschim Bardhaman	280	Asansol Dakshin	Agnimitra Paul	BJP	87,881	45.13	Sayani Ghosh	AITC	83,394	42.82	4,487	2.31
Paschim Bardhaman	281	Asansol Uttar	Ghatak Moloy	AITC	1,00,931	52.32	Krishnendu Mukherjee	BJP	79,821	41.38	21,110	10.94
Paschim Bardhaman	282	Kulti	Ajay Kumar Poddar	BJP	81,112	46.41	Ujjal Chatterjee	AITC	80,433	46.02	679	0.39
Paschim Bardhaman	283	Barabani	Bidhan Upadhyay	AITC	88,430	52.26	Arijit Roy	BJP	64,973	38.40	23,457	13.86
Birbhum	284	Dubrajpur	Anup Kumar Saha	BJP	98,083	47.94	Debabrata Saha	AITC	94,220	46.05	3,863	1.89
Birbhum	285	Suri	Bikash Roychoudhury	AITC	1,05,871	48.43	Chattopadhyay Jagannath	BJP	98,551	45.08	7,320	3.35
Birbhum	286	Bolpur	Sinha Chandranath	AITC	1,16,443	50.57	Anirban Ganguly	BJP	94,163	40.89	22,280	9.68
Birbhum	287	Nanoor	Bidhan Chandra Majhi	AITC	1,12,116	47.64	Tarakeswar Saha	BJP	1,05,446	44.81	6,670	2.83
Birbhum	288	Labpur	Abhijit Sinha (Rana)	AITC	1,08,423	51.14	Biswajit Mondal	BJP	90,448	42.66	17,975	8.48
Birbhum	289	Sainthia	Nilabati Saha	AITC	1,10,572	49.84	Piya Saha	BJP	95,329	42.97	15,243	6.87
Birbhum	290	Mayureswar	Abhijit Roy	AITC	1,00,425	50.36	Shyamapada Mondal	BJP	88,350	44.30	12,075	6.06
Birbhum	291	Rampurhat	Asish Banerjee	AITC	1,03,276	47.52	Subhasis Choudhury (Khokan)	BJP	94,804	43.62	8,472	3.90
Birbhum	292	Hansan	Dr. Asok Kumar Chattopadhyay	AITC	1,08,289	51.42	Nikhil Banerjee	BJP	57,676	27.39	50,613	24.03
Birbhum	293	Nalhati	Rajendra Prasad Singh (Raju Singh)	AITC	1,17,438	56.54	Tapas Kumar Yadav	BJP	60,533	29.15	56,905	27.39
Birbhum	294	Murarai	Dr. Mosarraf Hossain	AITC	1,46,496	67.23	Debasish Roy	BJP	48,250	22.14	98,246	45.09

== Controversies ==
Communist Party of India (Marxist) supporters and leaders accused No Vote To BJP campaign and CPIML Liberation of leading to the victory of All India Trinamool Congress. Relations between CPIM and CPIML Liberation weakened after 2021 West Bengal Legislative Election.

=== No Vote To BJP campaign ===
No Vote To BJP was a non-partisan, Anti-BJP political campaign in West Bengal. The campaign motto was We requested to all peoples of the West Bengal, vote for anyone in the election, but not vote for the BJP on the 2021 West Bengal Legislative Assembly election..

=== Nandigram controversy ===
On 18 January Mamata Banerjee announced at a rally in Nandigram that she would contest the upcoming assembly elections from Nandigram. Hours later, Suvendu Adhikari said he would defeat the CM by a margin of at least 50,000 votes or quit politics.

On the eve of polling in Nandigram, the ECI ordered the transfer of the sub-divisional police officer of Haldia and the circle inspector of Mahishadal in Purba Medinipur district to non-election assignments and imposed Section 144 in that constituency. A day after the polling, stray clashes took place between workers of the TMC and the BJP in some parts of Nandigram.

The votes were counted on 2 May. All eyes were set on the updates of high-voltage Nandigram constituency. 17 rounds of counting was to be done before declaring the winner. Mamata Banerjee was trailing in initial rounds. The EC informed that announcement of results for Nandigram would be delayed because of problem in server. In the 16th round, when the counting of votes in Gokulnagar panchayat area started, Mamata fell behind. After the 16th round, the counting of 17th round was delayed by an hour. Postal ballots were being counted at that time. At the end of the seventeenth round, it was announced that Mamata Banerjee had won by a margin of 1,200 (or 3,717) votes. Though later, it was declared that Suvendu had defeated (his) former party leader by approximately 1,956 votes. Mamata banerjee continued to claim that she won Nandigram, Security was beefed up in the vicinity of the Haldia counting centre amid fears of unrest.

Mamata Banerjee alleged that the returning officer of Nandigram constituency was threatened and the two observers sitting inside the counting centre were very biased.

The ECI wrote a letter to the West Bengal chief secretary and directed them to take all appropriate measures to keep a strict watch and regularly monitor the security provided to the returning officer in Nandigram.

Since Adhikari was declared winner, TMC workers protested outside the counting centre. Central Forces protected Adhikari's car while before it left the area. TMC workers alleged that the counting was stopped for three hours, the result was overturned after a power outage, and their agent was assaulted and thrown out from the counting centre by central forces.

On 14 July, the High Court issued a notice to Adhikari, the ECI, the state electoral officer, and the returning officer with a direction to keep all election-related records intact until the case was heard on 12 August. Adhikari went to the Supreme Court seeking transfer of Banerjee's election petition case outside the state.

On 12 August, Adhikari's lawyers submitted before the court of Justice Sarkar that the legislator has approached the Supreme Court seeking transfer of the case from West Bengal. In keeping with the respondent's prayer, Justice Sarkar adjourned the hearing to 15 November. On that date, Adhikari filed a petition in the Calcutta High Court seeking adjournment of the case. The High Court asked him to file a written statement explaining the reason for his no-confidence in the High Court by 29 November and it was decided that the next hearing would be held on 1 December.

== Reactions and analysis ==
For the first time since the creation of the state through division of Bengal Presidency, the state legislative assembly does not have any members from the INC or Left Front, who dominated and shaped the politics of the state until 1998 when the TMC was founded and overtook the INC as the main opposition party in the state.

Opinion polls and exit polls predicted a tight race between the TMC and BJP, and that TMC would win around 150 seats, BJP 140, with the remaining for Morcha. TMC won over 200 seats, while BJP overall performed poorly. Although it was the best ever performance of the state BJP in terms of both seats (before 2016, it never had more than one seat in the state Legislative assembly) and voteshare (at the height of the Ram mandir agitation, BJP managed to win 11.34% of votes in the 1991 election), it wasn't as phenomenal as it was in 2019.

BJP's vote share fell from 40% in the 2019 elections to 38%. Reasons given were:

- By fielding candidates who switched from TMC to BJP after the results of the 2019 general elections or months before the elections began, the party leadership angered the party cadres at grassroots level who have been associated with the party since the 2014 general elections and have been actively demanding that the party remove those same people from power, resulting in the defeat of 142 TMC turncoats who had been fielded by BJP as candidates in this election. The defeat of sitting TMC MLA Rabindranath Bhattacharjee, who had joined BJP on 8 March was significant because he lost in Singur, where people had started considering the 2006 anti-land acquisition movement led by Mamata Banerjee to be a historic blunder due to a lack of jobs in the region and had voted for BJP in the 2019 elections in the hopes of industrialisation. Similarly Rajib Banerjee, who won the Domjur seat by receiving more than 100,000 votes in the previous assembly election, lost by a margin of more than 42,000 votes because he was unable to consolidate the support of the local cadres from either TMC or BJP towards himself.
- Derogatory comments made towards Mamata Banerjee by BJP leaders, notably Modi taunting her by calling her out as Didi, O Didi from political rallies in Howrah and Barasat, Adhikari referring to her as Begum and Ghosh calling her out as haramjada ('harem-born child' in Bangla (Note: Unlike in the Middle East, 'harem' in the Indian subcontinent referred to the inner apartments of a Muslim household exclusively reserved for concubines, while the same for legitimately-wedded wives is called as zenana)) and his derogatory comments on Mamata Banerjee's injury, eight months after a Dalit woman was gangraped and strangled to death by four upper-caste men in Uttar Pradesh and BJP leaders there openly supported of the perpetrators were not viewed positively by Bengali women, who saw the BJP leaders trying to import the culture of misogyny and toxic masculinity generally associated with the Hindi belt. A large number of Bengali women (constituting 49% of the electorate) did not vote for BJP in spite of electoral promises like making education of females in the state free of cost from kindergarten to post-graduate level.
- Attempts made by BJP leaders to convert the tribal population into Hinduism (Note: According to the definition of a Hindu, as espoused by Hindutva ideologue Vinayak Damodar Savarkar, the BJP regards the Adivasi people as part of the Hindu society, and the RSS has always tried to make the Adivasis abandon their indigenous folk religion in favour of mainstream Hinduism in order to facilitate their integration into Hindu society, however certain Adivasi groups have resisted these attempts and have demanded their religion to be recognised as a separate religion) were widely unpopular, especially in the tribal-dominated Medinipur division As a result, tribal votes were divided between BJP and TMC as TMC regained back the support of tribal communities in the Jhargram, Paschim Medinipur and Malda districts while BJP continued to retain its tribal votes in Purulia, Bankura, Jalpaiguri and Alipurduar.
- An increase in petrol, diesel and LPG prices along with spike in cases related to the COVID-19 pandemic during the elections and BJP's response to it, most notably state BJP president Dilip Ghosh advocating consumption of cow urine (considered sacred to Hindu society due to sacredness of the cow in Hinduism) over vaccination, advocating extraction of gold allegedly found in the milk of zebu cattle native to the region as a means to overcome economic recession caused by the pandemic and promoting anti-intellectualism by labelling those intellectuals who criticised his promotion of pseudo-science as 'Hinduphobhic', 'alcohol-addicts' and 'dog meat eaters' (a racial slur used in India by Hindus against the Han Chinese and non-Hindu hill tribes of Northeast India) made the party unpopular to the Bengali middle-class.
- To compensate for the lack of organisational strength in the state and prevent outbreak of factionalism in the state unit between those who have connections with the RSS and have been associated with the party since the days of the Ram-mandir agitation and those who defected from other parties and have no RSS background, BJP depended heavily on non-Bengali leaders from the Hindi belt to campaign for the party. 52 Union Cabinet ministers and 17 senior BJP leaders, which included Yogi Adityanath, Shivraj Singh Chauhan, Gajendra Singh Shekhawat, Prahlad Patel, Sanjeev Balyan, Arjun Munda, Mansukh L. Mandaviya, Keshav Prasad Maurya, Narottam Mishra, Smriti Irani, Rajnath Singh, Dharmendra Pradhan, BJP party president J. P. Nadda, and secretary-in-charge of the state unit Kailash Vijayvargiya were sent to campaign in the state. Modi held 23 rallies, while Amit Shah held 79 in the state. The over-dependence of Hindi-speaking leaders who did not speak Bangla created a communication gap between the party and the electorate, who viewed their Bengali identity to be losing ground in the state to the aggressive promotion of culture from the Hindi belt by the BJP in the name of promoting Hindu unity.
- Although the Matua community continued to vote in favour of BJP, they did not vote in unison as they did in the 2019 elections. Fears centering around the National Register of Citizens, frustration due to delay in implementation of the CAA, and Mamata Banerjee's attempts to regain back the support of the Matua community by allotting money for community-specific development of Namasudras and declaring the birthday of Harichand Thakur, founder of the Matua movement, as a state government holiday led to the division of Matua votes between the BJP and TMC to some extent, which affected the party in Nadia and North 24 Parganas districts as BJP won 28 Matua-dominated seats and TMC retained 21 Matua-dominated seats.

The TMC increased its vote share from 43% in 2019 elections to 48% in the election. Reasons given were:

- After the debacle in the 2019 elections, Mamata Banerjee ordered her party to return the "cut-money" (money collected by extorting and accepting bribes from common people, in order to "allow" them to access government facilities) in an attempt to distance herself from corruption perpetrated by her cadres and maintain her clean image.
- To tone down the allegations of Muslim appeasement made against her, Mamata Banerjee declared an allowance for Hindu priests, providing 50,000 INR to each Durga Puja committee in the state, emphasising on her Bengali Brahmin background and reciting shlokas from the Devi Mahatmya in political rallies.
- The Didi Ke Bolo campaign launched by Prashant Kishor helped the electorate directly communicate with Mamata Banerjee and was widely popular in the state. The programs aimed to rebrand the public image of Mamata Banerjee from an arrogant pro-Muslim streetfighter prone to outbursts of anger to a down-to-earth leader who represents Bengali cultural values on a national level.
- To curb the influence of party cadres acting as middlemen between common people and government schemes, Mamata Banerjee launched government programs like Duare Sarkar (transl. "Government at your doorstep") and Paraye Paraye Somadhan (transl. "Solution at your neighbourhood") which aimed to directly deliver welfare schemes run by the state government to the public, and were well received.
- TMC countered BJP's campaign of polarisation on religious grounds based on aggressive propagation of Hindutva by labelling the BJP as a party of non-Bengalis who were importing an alien culture in the state in their attempts of achieving cultural homogenization under the name of Hindu unity and portraying Mamata Banerjee as the defendant of Bengali identity in the face of Hindutva through its official election slogan "Bangla nijer meyekei chay" (transl. "Bengal wants its own daughter")
- Mamata Banerjee's decision to contest the elections only from Nandigram instead of her home-turf Bhabanipur (from where she had been elected MLA twice and MP for South Kolkata 7 times) motivated her party cadres demoralised by the rise of BJP in 2019 and the ensuing defection of many top TMC leaders, to dedicate themselves entirely in preventing the BJP from coming into power in the state. Modi, Shah, and an entire hoard of high-profile leaders of national politics campaigned to remove Mamata Banerjee from power with the ECI acting biasedly in favour of the BJP and that she was campaigning from a wheelchair, solidified Mamata Banerjee's image in public perception as a fighter who is unwilling to give up without a fight. The TMC utilised this indomitable fighter spirit of her through its unofficial election anthem "Khela Hobe" (transl. "The game is on"), which was later gave rise to the slogan "Bhanga Paye Khela Hobe" (transl. "The game will be played even with a fractured leg").
- Welfare schemes implemented by Mamata Banerjee like Kanyashree were already popular among the masses. They were combined by other populist schemes in the list of electoral promises, most notably Lakshmir Bhandar (basic income support for unemployed women).
- BJP's endorsement of the killing of Muslims in the Sitalkuchi firing incident left the Bengali Muslim community of the state (who constitute 30% of the electorate) fearful for their existence and security in the scenario of a BJP-ruled West Bengal, and they voted unitedly for the TMC in the election, especially in the Muslim-majority Malda division, where the Muslim votes until then was traditionally divided between the INC and CPI(M).

The combined vote share of INC and Left Front fell from 11% in the 2019 general elections to 8% in this elections. Reasons given were:

- Confusion regarding the party's policy was an important factor. Central INC leaders like Rahul Gandhi refrained from campaigning against Mamata Banerjee as the party enjoyed cooperation with the TMC at a national level, but at the state level PCC chief Adhir Ranjan Chowdhury refused to cooperate with TMC, and INC leaders found it difficult to justify their alliance with the Left Front in West Bengal while opposing the Left Front in Kerala at the same time. The Left Front was divided over whether to consider BJP to be a greater threat than the TMC, and decided to focus more on opposing TMC than the BJP. This strategy backfired on the Left Front as the TMC portrayed itself as the party that could withstand BJP in the state, and the Left Front was viewed as a "vote-cutter" that divided the anti-BJP votes to BJP's advantage. A group of voters who had voted for the Left Front in the 2019 general elections, under influence of the non-partisan No Vote to BJP campaign voted for the TMC to prevent BJP from coming into power.
- To attract the anti-TMC and anti-BJP votes towards itself, the Sanyukta Morcha tried to portray BJP and TMC to be the same on the grounds that both parties harboured corrupt leaders and engaged in identity politics. The INC's official election slogan was "Aar kono bhul na, aar kono phul na" ("No More Mistakes, No More Flowers", referring to the election symbols of BJP and TMC). The Left Front also criticised both the parties in social media under the term Bijemool (portmanteau of the words BJP and Trinamool). This didn't catch on with the electorate, who saw BJP as a Hindu right-wing party and TMC as a center-left party.
- In spite of fielding Hindu candidates in the seats it had been allotted, public perception about ISF remained to be of a party by and for Muslims led by a hardliner cleric, Abbas Siddiqui, who had compared actress and TMC MP Nusrat Jahan to a prostitute in one of his apolitical jalsas in the past, and the alliance between them and Peerzada of Furfura Sharif was met with unease within the INC. The alliance with ISF wasn't appreciated by the Left Front workers at the grassroots level, who saw it as a violation of the Communist viewpoint of religion being the opium of the masses.
- The inability of aged leaders at the top of Left Front to adapt to changed conditions in state politics and lack of youth representation in the top decision-making bodies has also been cited as a reason.
- In spite of mobilising huge amounts of crowds in the first rally of the Sanyukta Morcha at the Brigade Parade grounds before the elections began, ISF failed to divide the Muslim votes between itself and TMC in Presidency division and Burdwan division as expected from it in the aftermath of the Sitalkuchi shooting incident. The victory ISF's lone winning candidate (Abbas's brother Nowshad Siddiqui) in Bhangar has been credited to Arabul Islam's dissatisfaction for not being fielded as the candidate and the resulting non-cooperation with the district TMC leadership.

Veteran BJP leader Tathagata Roy lashed out at the party leadership on Twitter for viewing the ground conditions in the state through what he called KDSA (i.e. Kailash Vijayvargiya, Dilip Ghosh, Shiv Prakash and Arvind Menon) and questioned the party's decision to field Nogorer notis (transl. "City prostitutes"), referring to actresses Payel Sarkar, Tanushree Chakraborty and Srabanti Chatterjee, who were seen in a boat ride with TMC leader Madan Mitra in the past. He also specifically blamed Dilip Ghosh's many controversial remarks, most notably his misogynistic comments against Goddess Durga, the most widely revered Hindu deity in Bengali Hindu society in his attempt to glorify Lord Rama, the most widely revered Hindu deity in North Indian Hindu society (Note: worship of Rama is not much popular in Bengal, due to the influence of Radha Krishna-centric Gaudiya Vaishnavism, Shaktism centred around Durga & Kali and Shiva-centric Nath ideology) and the ideological poster-boy of the RSS-BJP alongside Hanuman since the days of the Ram-mandir movement to justify the 'holier-than-thou' attitude of the Bengali Hindu supporters of BJP over the Bengali Hindus who don't support the BJP at a media conclave while campaigning for the elections, to be responsible for the party's poor performance. His Nogorer Noti remark drew widespread criticism online.

The average winning margin of all the candidates in this election stood at 26,964 votes, while the same for AITC candidates was 31,760 votes. This loss was stated by the media to be Modi's personal failure.

In view of the popular slogan "Khela Hobe", Mamata Banerjee declared that her party would observe 16 August as Khela Hobe Divas, which the BJP tried to link with Direct Action Day. She also launched a government scheme named "Khela Hobe" which granted 5,00,000 INR and free footballs among 25,000 sporting clubs in the state to promote sports in economically poorer sections of society.

Countering Shah's claim that BJP would come to power in West Bengal by winning around 200 or more seats out of the 294 seats in the state legislative assembly, Kishor publicly declared that he would resign from his job if BJP managed to win more than a 100 seats in this elections. Although he delivered his promise, Kishor declared his retirement from on being an election strategist on 2 May, citing personal reasons.

=== Allegations of partial Election Commission ===
Election strategist Prashant Kishor who helped TMC in the elections, accused the Election Commission of being partial and helping the BJP saying, "I have never seen a more partial Election Commission... It did everything to help the BJP... From allowing the use of religion to scheduling the poll and bending the rules, the ECI did everything to help the BJP."

== Aftermath ==
=== Violence ===
Politically motivated violence in West Bengal has taken place since before the 2021 West Bengal elections. In June 2019, 2 Trinamool Congress (TMC) workers were killed in Bengal. The party had blamed Bhartiya Janta Party (BJP) for it. In December 2020, Indian Home Minister and BJP member Amit Shah said that more than 300 BJP members had been killed due to the political violence and that "investigation in those cases hasn't moved an inch".

After the 2021 results were announced, post-poll violence broke out in some areas of the state, which was a continuation of the violence that took place across the state during the election.

On 2 May, the results had just started showing signs of Trinamool returning to power when the men arrived, going house to house, ransacking them, breaking some. By the end of the day, 40 families of a colony located on KPC Medical College grounds in Jadavpur had fled. All BJP supporters or workers say TMC threats had kept them away for two-and-a-half months . Many rapes of women were reported, and many BJP workers' families were forced to flee the state.

=== Government formation ===
Mamata Banerjee took oath as the Chief Minister of West Bengal for the third time on 5 May 2021 at the Raj Bhawan in Kolkata. She expanded the cabinet on 10 May 2021 when 43 TMC leaders were sworn in as ministers. 17 new people were in the Third Banerjee ministry.

=== Vacant seats ===
TMC candidate Kajal Sinha from Khardaha died from COVID-19 after polling but before the results of the state assembly elections were announced, in which he emerged victorious. The ECI deferred the elections to two assembly seats in West Bengal in view of the COVID-19 pandemic. The polling had been rescheduled earlier to 16 May 2021 due to the death of two contestants from the Samserganj and Jangipur constituencies. Mocking this decision, the TMC said "The Election Commission, though late, finally woke up. But when demands were made repeatedly to arrange the election in one day by combining 2–3 phases, then they remained silent." Two BJP MLAs – Nisith Pramanik from Dinhata and Jaganath Sarkar from Shantipur constituencies – resigned after the election results, as they were sitting MPs from Cooch Behar and Ranaghat, respectively, and wanted to continue as MPs. Jayanta Naskar, TMC MLA of Gosaba, died from COVID-19 on 19 June after testing negative for the disease.

=== Appointments ===
Adhikari, with the support of 22 MLAs, was elected as Leader of Opposition in the West Bengal Legislative Assembly on 10 May 2021.

BJP MPs Subhash Sarkar from Bankura, John Barla from Alipurduar, Nisith Pramanik from Coochbehar, and Shantanu Thakur from Bangaon were made ministers-of-state in the Union Cabinet after the polls.

Incumbent Cabinet ministers from the state, Babul Supriyo from Asansol and Debasree Chaudhuri from Raiganj, resigned from their positions due to their failure in rallying the voters from their respective constituencies to vote for BJP. After the Cabinet reshuffle, Supriyo stated that he was quitting politics and his position as an MP, but after meeting the leaders of BJP, he decided to retain his position as an MP. He later joined TMC, stating that he wanted to remain in politics but his political participation was being restricted by BJP due to his defeat from Tollyganj and the party's poor performance in Asanol.

Abhishek Banerjee was promoted from the president of state TMC's youth wing to all-India general secretary.

Long time RSS activist and Balurghat MP Sukanta Majumdar succeeded Dilip Ghosh as the president of the state BJP unit, while Ghosh was made one of the national vice-presidents of the party.

=== Defections ===
The Union Home Ministry decided to provide Y+ category security to Sisir Adhikari and his son Dibyendu Adhikari.

East Bardhaman MP Sunil Mondal, who had earlier defected from TMC to BJP alongside Adhikari in 2020, declared in August that he was "always with the TMC".

Adhikari demanded that the speaker Biman Banerjee dismiss Mukul Roy from the legislative assembly according to the anti-defection law, but TMC stated if Adhikari's father Sisir Adhikari can remain the MP from Kanthi even after switching from TMC to BJP in early 2021, then Roy should be allowed to as well.

Four other MLAs – Soumen Roy from Kaliaganj, Biswajit Das from Bagda, Tanmoy Ghosh from Bishnupur and Krishna Kalyani from Raiganj switched from BJP to TMC following Roy without being disqualified from their membership. All-India president of Congress's women's wing and its national spokesperson and former Silchar MP Sushmita Dev joined TMC, and was followed by Luizinho Faleiro.

After joining TMC, Supriyo resigned as MP on 19 October.

== See also ==
- 2021 elections in India
- 2023 West Bengal local elections
- 2021 Kolkata Municipal Corporation election
- By-elections
  - By-elections to the 16th West Bengal Assembly
  - By-elections to the 17th West Bengal Assembly
- Indian general elections
  - 2019 Indian general election in West Bengal
  - 2024 Indian general election in West Bengal
