= By-elections to the 16th West Bengal Assembly =

During the timeframe of 2016–2021, various by-elections were held for the West Bengal Legislative Assembly.

The first by election was held in November 2016.

== 2016 ==
Assembly Constituency	Winner		Runner up	
Assembly Constituency	Candidate	Party	Candidate	Party
Monteswar	Saikat Panja	AITC	Md. Osman Gani Sarkar	CPIM

== 2017 ==
By-elections were held for Kanthi Dakshin and Sabang in 2017.

Assembly Constituency	Winner		Runner up	
Assembly Constituency	Candidate	Party	Candidate	Party
Kanthi Dakshin	Chandrima Bhattacharya	AITC	Sourindra Mohan Jana	BJP
Sabang	Geeta Rani Bhunia	AITC	Rita Mandal (Jana)	BBC

== 2018 ==
By-election was held for Noapara. Both the seats were won by the TMC. and Maheshtala.

Assembly Constituency	Winner		Runner up	
Assembly Constituency	Candidate	Party	Candidate	Party
Noapara	Sunil Singh	AITC	Sandip Banerjee	BJP
Maheshtala	Dulal Chandra Das	AITC	Sujit Kumar Ghosh	BJP

== 2019 ==
By-election was held for eight assembly constituencies alongside the 2019 Lok Sabha election. BJP won four out of the eight seats, whereas AITC won three seats and INC won on one seat. Later Kaliaganj, Karimpur and Kharagpur Sadar were won by TMC candidates.

Assembly Constituency	Winner		Runner up	
Assembly Constituency	Candidate	Party	Candidate	Party
Islampur	Abdul Karim Chowdhary	All India Trinamool Congress	Dr. Saumyaroop Mandal	Bharatiya Janata Party
Darjeeling	Neeraj Zimba	Bharatiya Janata Party	Binay Tamang	Gorkha Janmukti Morcha
Habibpur	Joyel Murmu	Bharatiya Janata Party	Amal Kisku	All India Trinamool Congress
Naoda	Sahina Mumtaz Begum	All India Trinamool Congress	Sunil Kumar Mondal	Indian National Congress
Kandi	Shafiul Alam Khan	Indian National Congress	Goutam Roy	All India Trinamool Congress
Krishnaganj	Ashis Kumar Biswas	Bharatiya Janata Party	Pramatha Ranjan Bose	All India Trinamool Congress
Bhatpara	Pawan Kumar Singh	Bharatiya Janata Party	Madan Mitra	All India Trinamool Congress
Uluberia Purba	Idris Ali	All India Trinamool Congress	Pratyush Mandal	Bharatiya Janata Party
Karimpur	Bimalendu Sinha Roy	All India Trinamool Congress	Jayprakash Majumdar	Bharatiya Janata Party
Kaliaganj	Tapan Deb Singha	All India Trinamool Congress	Kamal Chandra Sarkar	Bharatiya Janata Party
Kharagpur	Pradip Sarkar	All India Trinamool Congress	Prem Chandra Jha	Bharatiya Janata Party

== See also ==
- By-elections to the 17th West Bengal Assembly
