= Kanyashree Prakalpa =

Government of West Bengal project to improve the life and condition of girls

Kanyashree
- Mission statement: To reduce dropout rate and prevent early marriage
- Type of project: Scholarship scheme for girls
- Location: West Bengal
- Owner: Government of West Bengal
- Founder: Mamata Banerjee
- Country: India (primarily in West Bengal)
- Established: 8 March 2013
- Status: Active
- Website: www.wbkanyashree.gov.in

Kanyashree is an initiative undertaken by the Government of West Bengal to improve the lives and status of the girls by helping low-income families with cash so that families do not force their daughters into arranged child marriages because of economic difficulties. The purpose of this initiative is to uplift girls who are from poor families and are unable pursue higher studies due to tough economic conditions. It has been internationally recognised by the United Nations Department of International Development and the UNICEF.

The scheme has two components:

1. Annual scholarship of Rs. 1000.00
2. One time grant of Rs. 25,000.00

The annual scholarship is for unmarried girls aged 13–18 years enrolled in class VIII-XII in government recognized regular or equivalent open school or vocational / technical training courses. Recently the bar of income was withdrawn by the government of West Bengal; now every girl can apply for that scheme.

== Scheme ==
Kanyashree Prakalpa has been designed to ensure that girls stay in school and delay their marriages until at least the age of 18. Kanyashree's strategy is simple: keeping girls away from marriage until they reach legal adulthood and keeping them in the streamline of their education. To do this, the government facilitates financial aid for female students. It has changed the behaviours and attitudes particularly of parents who would otherwise be inclined to marry their daughters before 18 years of age.

The Scheme has two conditional cash benefit components.

1. The first is K1, an annual scholarship of Rs. 1000/- to be paid annually to the girls from 13 to 18 years of age group for every year that they remain in education, provided they are unmarried at the time. (Note: During the years 2013–14 and 2014-1 the annual scholarship was Rs. 500/-).
2. The second benefit is K2, a one-time grant of 25,000/-, to be paid when girls turn 18, provided that they are engaged in an academic or occupations pursuit and are unmarried at the time.

The term 'education' encompasses secondary and higher secondary education, as well as the various vocational, technical and sports courses available for this age group. To ensure an equity focus, the scheme is open only to girls from families whose annual income is R. 1,20,000/- or less. For girls with special needs, girls who have lost both parents, as well as for girls currently residing in Juvenile Justice homes, this criterion is waived. Although the annual scholarship is payable only when girls reach Class VIII, this criterion is waived for girls with special needs whose disability is 40% or more.

== Award and recognition ==
- In June 2017 United Nations honours Kanyashree with the highest public service award. Kanyashree was ranked the best among 552 such social sector schemes from across 62 countries that were nominated for the coveted award.
- Finalist in GEM-Tech Awards 2016 organized by ITU and UN Women
- United Nations WSIS Prize 2016 Champion in e-Government Category (WSIS Action Line C7)
- CSI-Nihilent Award, 2014–15.
- Skoch Award and Order of Merit 2015 for Smart Governance.
- National E-governance Award 2014–2015 awarded by the Department of Administrative Reforms and Public Grievances, Government of India.
- Manthan Award for Digital Inclusion for Development (South Asia and Asia Pacific) 2014 under the category E-Women and Empowerment.
- West Bengal Chief Ministers Award for Empowerment of Girls, 2014

The Scheme was appreciated as a good practice at:

- Trafficking in Persons (TIP) Enclave organized by U. S. Consulate & Shakti Vahini (Siliguri, February 2016).
- National Workshop on "Conditional Cash Transfers for Children: Experiences of States in India" organized by NITI Aayog, India (Delhi, December 2015).
- Consultation on "Empowerment of Adolescent Girls" organized by the World Bank (Ranchi, May 2015).
- Consultation on "Child Marriage and Teenage Pregnancies" organized Tata Institute of Social Sciences (Delhi, March 2015).
- The "Girls Summit organized by DFID and UNICEF (London, July 2014)
- The United Nations has commended the 'Kanyashree Prakalpa Programme' initiated by West Bengal Chief Minister Mamata Banerjee for its empowerment of daughters.

== Kanyashree Day ==
14 August is celebrated as Kanyashree Day to promote the scheme throughout the state. On August 14, 2013 state wide events were held to publicize the scheme. In Kolkata the event was presided over by the Chief Minister of West Bengal, Mamata Banerjee. Awareness campaigns were organized by the government in districts.

== Kanyashree University ==
The state government of West Bengal is setting up Kanyashree University in Nadia district and Kanyashree colleges across the state so as to empower girls. The Kanyashree University would be only for women. Earlier in January 2019, the West Bengal Chief Minister Mamata Banerjee laid the foundation stone of new Kanyashree University at Krishnagar in Nadia district.

== Year-wise statistics ==
The following are year-wise statistics:

| Scheme Type | | Annual Scholarship (K1) | Renewal (K1) | One-Time Grant (K2) | Upgradation (K2) | Total Application |
|---|---|---|---|---|---|---|
| 2013–14 | Uploaded | 18,89,960 | 0 | 1,44,197 | 0 | 20,34,157 |
| 2013–14 | Sanctioned | 18,44,990 | 0 | 1,38,965 | 0 | 19,83,955 |
| 2014–15 | Uploaded | 7,69,945 | 12,22,942 | 49,138 | 2,56,737 | 22,98,762 |
| 2014–15 | Sanctioned | 7,59,061 | 12,04,921 | 46,118 | 2,49,266 | 22,59,366 |
| 2015–16 | Uploaded | 6,11,154 | 15,83,073 | 34,979 | 3,01,874 | 25,31,080 |
| 2015–16 | Sanctioned | 5,95,221 | 15,76,218 | 32,379 | 2,96,969 | 25,00,787 |
| 2016–17 | Uploaded | 7,39,759 | 16,05,615 | 25,198 | 3,29,533 | 27,00,105 |
| 2016–17 | Sanctioned | 7,09,517 | 15,79,703 | 23,797 | 3,21,028 | 26,34,045 |
| 2017–18 | Uploaded | 7,05,184 | 17,48,332 | 3,319 | 3,94,772 | 28,51,607 |
| 2017–18 | Sanctioned | 6,87,623 | 17,36,138 | 3,270 | 3,89,392 | 28,16,423 |
| 2018–19 | Uploaded | 8,08,676 | 18,42,334 | 16,734 | 4,29,577 | 30,97,321 |
| 2018–19 | Sanctioned | 8,05,480 | 18,41,544 | 16,390 | 4,25,512 | 30,88,926 |
| 2019–20 | Uploaded | 2,03,896 | 17,72,794 | 0 | 3,52,562 | 23,29,252 |
| 2019–20 | Sanctioned | 1,52,748 | 16,98,680 | 0 | 2,52,215 | 21,03,643 |
| Till Date | Uploaded | 57,28,574 | 97,75,090 | 2,73,565 | 20,65,055 | 1,78,42,284 |
| Till Date | Sanctioned | 55,54,640 | 96,37,204 | 2,60,919 | 19,34,382 | 1,73,87,145 |

- Total K1 Girls Since Inception: 57,28,574
- Total K2 Girls Since Inception: 23,38,620
- Total Unique Girls Since Inception: 60,02,139

== Similar programmes ==
A similar program was instituted in Bangladesh in 1982, called the Female Secondary School Stipend Program. It was first launched in six areas of the country and later extended to other areas owing to its success.

== See also ==
- Didi Ke Bolo, grievance-redressal initiative taken by the Government of West Bengal
