= Didi Ke Bolo =

Initiative started by the All India Trinamool Congress

Didi ke Bolo
- Location: West Bengal
- Key people: Mamata Banerjee; Prashant Kishore
- Website: Official website

Didi Ke Bolo (transl. Tell Didi) was an initiative started by the All India Trinamool Congress, that provided a platform for the people of West Bengal to directly lodge concerns or complaints to the Trinamool chairperson and state chief minister Mamata Banerjee. As of 13 August 2019, nearly 500,000 grievances were lodged using this platform.

== Background ==
All India Trinamool Congress appointed Prashant Kishor as their political strategist after 2019 Indian general election. Kishor conducted a series of meetings with the senior leaders of All India Trinamool Congress, and came up with the idea of "Didi Ke Bolo".

== Implementation ==
A 250-members team runs an office for "Didi Ke Bolo" at Rajarhat, Kolkata. When someone calls to lodge a grievance, an executive receives the call, and notes down the contact information of the caller, and the nature of the complaint. Complaints are received from the project's official website also. Usually, a complainant gets a call back within 48 hours. The entire process is supervised by the chief minister's grievance cell.

== Reception ==
According to The New Indian Express, this campaign received good response from the people of West Bengal. As of 13 August 2019 nearly 500,000 grievances were lodged using this platform. More than one lakh people have called the helpline number in the last 24 hours to convey their messages to the chief minister. In August 2019, a person in Durgapur, West Bengal was beaten up by after he lodged corruption complaint against a local political leader. On 8 August 2019, 20 Bengali families from Karnataka were rescued by complaining in "Didi Ke Bolo". Their houses were surrounded by flood water.

Dilip Ghosh, BJP chief of West Bengal, claimed that the campaign is copied from BJP's Chai Pe Charcha. Indian National Congress leader Somen Mitra launched "Didike Bolchi" and asked several questions. Mitra remarked "We want to keep the questions and answers on record, which necessitated our own website".
