= Second Mukherjee ministry =

1969–1970 government of West Bengal, India

- 8th Ministry of West Bengal
- 1969—1970
- Date formed: 25 February 1969
- Date dissolved: 30 July 1970

People and organisations
- Governor: Dharma Vira; Deep Narayan Sinha; Shanti Swaroop Dhavan
- Chief Minister: Ajoy Mukherjee
- No. of ministers: 30
- Ministers removed: 3
- Total no. of members: 33
- Member party: UF: CPI(M); BC; CPI; AIFB; RSP; SSP; SUCI; LSS; ABGL; WPI; RCPI; MFB; IND
- Status in legislature: Majority 214 / 280 (76%)
- Opposition party: INC(R)
- Opposition leader: Prafulla Chandra Sen

History
- Election: 1969
- Outgoing election: 1967
- Legislature term: 5th Assembly
- Predecessor: Prafulla Chandra Ghosh ministry
- Successor: Third Ajoy Mukherjee ministry

The Second Ajoy Mukherjee ministry was the coalition government that ruled the Indian state of West Bengal for 13 months, 1969–1970. The Second United Front Cabinet was formed after the 1967 First United Front Cabinet had been dismissed in 1967, President's Rule introduced and a mid-term election held in 1969. The United Front got a renewed popular mandate in the 1969 election, with the Communist Party of India (Marxist) calling the shots but with a non-leftist Chief Minister. The 13-month reign of the Second United Front Cabinet was marked by the struggle for comprehensive land reform, labour disputes, political violence and coalition infighting.

== Background ==
The first United Front cabinet had been dismissed by the West Bengal Governor on 21 November 1967. President's Rule had been introduced in the state on 20 February 1968.

A 12-party United Front coalition contested the 1969 West Bengal Legislative Assembly election, with a 32-point common programme. The election outcome was a landslide victory for the United Front; winning 214 seats and 49.7% of the votes.

== Ministers sworn in ==
Second United Front cabinet took office in February 1969. The second United Front cabinet had 27 cabinet ministers and 3 ministers of state. By comparison, the 1967 first United Front cabinet had 19 ministers.

CPI(M) was the largest party of the United Front in the Legislative Assembly, but as per a pre-election agreement the post of Chief Minister went to Ajoy Kumar Mukherjee of the Bangla Congress. Nevertheless, CPI(M) obtained all key portfolios in the government. SUCI resented the fact that it had not been given the Labour portfolio. The Food and Supplies department had been allocated to the CPI(M), but CPI(M) allowed Sudhindranath Kumar of the Revolutionary Communist Party of India to occupy this ministry.

Minister	Portfolio(s)	Party
Ajoy Kumar Mukherjee	Chief Minister, Home (other than General Administration and Police)	Bangla Congress
Jyoti Basu	Deputy Chief Minister, Home (General Administration and Police)	Communist Party of India (Marxist)
Hare Krishna Konar	Land and Land Revenue (Reforms)	Communist Party of India (Marxist)
Kanailal Bhattacharyya	Agriculture, Community Development	All India Forward Bloc
Sushil Kumar Dhara	Commerce and Industries	Bangla Congress
Charu Mihir Sarkar	Community Development	Bangla Congress
Renu Chakraborty	Co-operation and Social Welfare	Communist Party of India
Sambhu Ghosh	Cottage and Small Scale Industries	All India Forward Bloc
Satyapriya Roy	Education	Communist Party of India (Marxist)
Krishna Chandra Halder	Excise	Communist Party of India (Marxist)
Pravash Chandra Roy	Fisheries	Communist Party of India (Marxist)
Sudhindranath Kumar	Food	Revolutionary Communist Party of India
Bhabatosh Soren	Forest	Bangla Congress
Nani Bhattacharya	Health	Revolutionary Socialist Party
Jyoti Bhushan Bhattacharya	Information and Public Relations	Workers Party of India
Biswanath Mukherjee	Irrigation and Waterways	Communist Party of India
Bhakti Bhushan Mandal	Judicial and Legislative	All India Forward Bloc
Krishnapada Ghosh	Labour	Communist Party of India (Marxist)
Somnath Lahiri	Local Self Government, Development and Planning	Communist Party of India
Bibhuti Dasgupta	Panchayat	Lok Sewak Sangh
Jatin Chakraborty	Parliamentary Affairs	Revolutionary Socialist Party
Golam Yazdani	Passport and Civil Defence	Communist Party of India (Marxist)
Subodh Banerjee	Public Works	Socialist Unity Centre of India
Niranjan Sengupta	Refugee, Relief and Rehabilitation and Jails	Communist Party of India (Marxist)
Abdur Rezzak Khan	Relief and Social Welfare	Communist Party of India
Deo Prakash Rai	Schedule Castes and Tribes Welfare	All India Gorkha League
M.A. Rasul	Transport	Communist Party of India (Marxist)
Protiva Mukherjee	Roads (Minister of State)	Socialist Unity Centre of India
Ram Chatterjee	Sports (Minister of State)	Marxist Forward Bloc
Barada Mukutmoni	Tourism (Minister of State)	Bolshevik Party of India

== Later changes in the cabinet ==
On 9 May 1969 Sudhir Chandra Das, dissident leader of the Praja Socialist Party, was sworn in as Animal Husbandry & Veterinary Minister, raising the number of ministers to 31.

Tarun Sengupta was named new Refugee, Relief and Rehabilitation and Jails Minister after Niranjan Sengupta's death. Mohammed Amin replaced Abdullah Rasul as Transport Minister, after Abdullah Rasul's resignation.

== Allies ==
The Samyukta Socialist Party declined joining the government, but supported it from outside. However, SSP was not fully supportive of the government. CPI(M) and SSP activists clashes in the tea gardens and colleries. SSP, along with the Bharatiya Jana Sangh, raised the 'Rabindra Sarobar incident' issue to discredit the United Front government.

The Progressive Muslim League also supported the United Front government from outside.

== Land reform ==
Mobilization for land reform was led by Hare Krishna Konar and Benoy Choudhury the key priority of the CPI(M). At the time the legal limit on land holdings was 25 acres, but in many cases landlords held more lands under fake names. CPI(M) organised groups of 5–10 cadres in the country-side to organise poor peasants seize lands above the legal limit. At times groups of over 10,000 peasants would congregate to seize lands. The groups of cadres also organised sharecroppers to demand from landowners that their shares be paid in full. By late 1969 the CPI(M) peasant front, the Krishak Samiti, claimed 939,000 members in West Bengal. Through popular mobilisation 300,000 acres of land was redistributed, according to government sources, but widespread confrontations provoked a chaotic situation across the state. Clashes occurred between members of different political parties.

== Labour struggles ==
With the CPI(M) in charge of the Home and Labour departments, police were instructed not to intervene against striking workers. Gheraos were effectively legalised. Salaries of workers increased as a result. In the first six months of the second United Front government there were 551 strikes and 73 lock-outs across the state, affecting some 570,000 workers.

== Other policies ==
In local governance, the second United Front continued in the path of the first United Front government. A comprehensive Panchayat Bill was presented in the Legislative Assembly.

In Education, the Second United Front government introduced the Sahaj Path primer of Rabindranath Tagore for teaching Bengali language.

Autonomy for the Darjeeling hills was one of the 32 points in the 1969 United Front programme. Nevertheless, no progress was made on this front during its short tenure.

== Naxal uprising ==
A number of leaders of the Naxalite movement, such as Kanu Sanyal and Jangal Santhal, which had been jailed by the first United Front government in 1967, were released in April 1969. The United Front deemed that the Naxalite movement in northern Bengal had been subdued by this time.

On 22 April 1969, the Naxalites formed a party of their own, the Communist Party of India (Marxist-Leninist).

The CPI(ML) clashed with both police forces and the CPI(M). The United Front government sought to quell the Naxalite movement and arrested a number of its leaders. Nevertheless, the violence continued. The Naxalites turned West Bengal into a battlefield, whilst the United Front was also under pressure from the Indian National Congress and the Congress government in Delhi.

== Political violence ==
During this period, there was significant levels of political violence in the state. Clashes between political parties were often violent, even between United Front coalition partners. Over 700 political murders were reported in 1969, over 600 of them being acknowledged by the state Home Department.

By mid-1969 CPI(M) had an organised 50,000 member strong volunteer force in West Bengal, a body the party thought of as an embryo of a future Liberation Army. The RSP had a paramilitary body of its own, the Inquilabi Fouj ('Revolutionary Army'), the CPI also developed a fighting unit. Wealthy landlords, in resistance against the United Front parties and the Naxalites, set up their own private paramilitaries.

== Coalition infighting ==
There was significant infighting between coalition partners. Coalition partners accused CPI(M) of trying to impose its own hegemony over the United Front. There was tension between the two main United Front coalition partners, the Bangla Congress and the CPI(M). The prevailing chaos in the cabinet pushed the Chief Minister to undertake a hunger strike in Curzon Park, just in front of Writers' Building, in protest against his own coalition partners.

There was also significant tension between CPI(M) and CPI, with the CPI being increasing drawn towards the Indian National Congress. In June 1969 the CPI general secretary, C. Rajeshwar Rao, charged that CPI(M) had adopted a "domineering and dictatorial" attitude towards its coalition partners and CPI in particular. In September 1969 the CPI West Bengal State Council issued a resolution that accused CPI(M) of following a 'bankrupt opportunistic line' and claimed CPI(M) had created a 'reign of terror' in the Baranagore against CPI activists.

== Fall ==
On 19 February 1970, three ministers belonging to the Bangla Congress (Sushil Kumar Dhara, Charu Mihir Sarkar and Bhabatosh Soren) submitted their resignations to their party. Ajoy Mukherjee presented his resignation on 16 March 1970. The government was dismissed on 30 July 1970.
