= 1971 West Bengal Legislative Assembly election =

Assembly Election of West Bengal, India

- 10 March 1971

All 280 seats in the West Bengal Legislative Assembly 141 seats needed for a majority
- Turnout: 62.03% (▼4.48 pp)
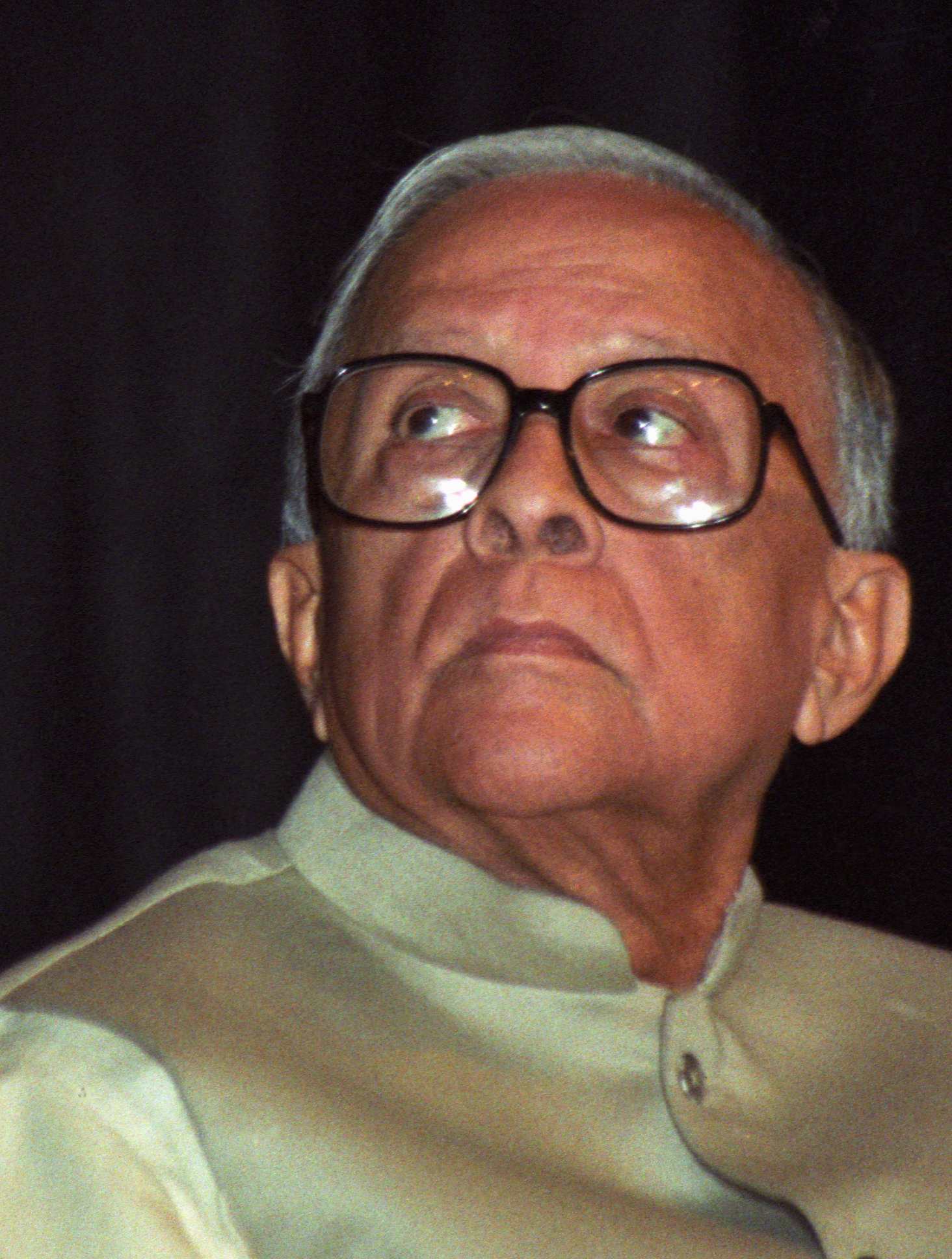

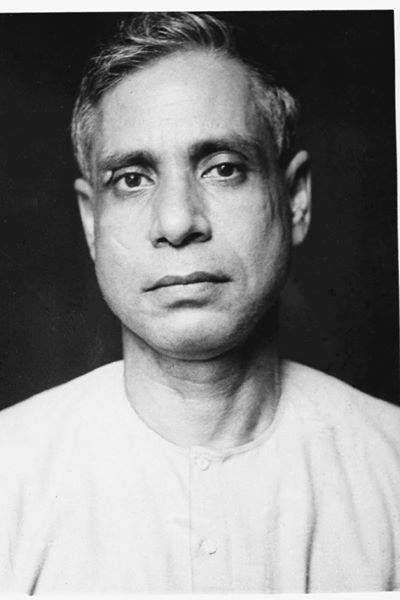
	Majority party	Minority party
		INC (R)
Leader	Jyoti Basu	Abdus Sattar
Party	CPI(M)	INC(R)
Leader since	1964	1971
Leader's seat	Baranagar	Lalgola
Last election	20%, 80 seats	41.3%, 55 seats
Seats won	113	105
Seat change	▲33	▲50
Popular vote	4,241,557	3,767,314
Percentage	32.9%	29.2%
Swing	▲13 pp	▼12.1 pp
	Third party	Fourth party
	CPI
Leader	Biswanath Mukherjee	Ajoy Mukherjee
Party	CPI	Bangla Congress
Leader since	1971	1967
Leader's seat	Medinipur	Tamluk
Last election	7%, 30 seats	8.17%, 33 seats
Seats won	13	5
Seat change	▼17	▼28
Popular vote	1,091,578	6,953,76
Percentage	8.46%	5.39%
Swing	▲1.46 pp	▼2.78 pp
Chief Minister before election
Ajoy Kumar Mukherjee
Bangla Congress
Elected Chief Minister
Ajoy Kumar Mukherjee
Bangla Congress

Legislative Assembly elections were held in the Indian state of West Bengal in 1971. The assembly election was held alongside the 1971 Indian general election.

== Parties and coalitions ==
Ahead of the 1971 election the map of party coalitions was redrawn. The United Front had split into two after the resignation of its Chief Minister. The United Left Front, also known as the Six-Party Coalition, was led by the Communist Party of India (Marxist) and included the Revolutionary Communist Party of India (Sudhindranath Kumar group), the Biplobi Bangla Congress, the Bolshevik Party of India (Nepal Bhattacharya group), the Workers Party of India and the Marxist Forward Bloc.

The United Left Democratic Front, also known as the Eight-Party Coalition, was led by the Communist Party of India and included the All India Forward Bloc, the Socialist Unity Centre of India, the All India Gorkha League, the Bolshevik Party of India (Barada Mukutmoni group), the RCPI (Anadi Das group), the Samyukta Socialist Party and the Praja Socialist Party (Rebel). The ULDF failed to reach a seat-sharing agreement with the Bangla Congress, but managed to agree to some seat-sharings with the Congress(R).

The Bangla Congress courted the Congress(R) for a seat-sharing alliance, but the Congress(R) rejected the offer. For Congress(R) the Bangla Congress was considered too close to Congress(O).

== Violence ==
The electoral campaign was marred by violent incidents. The Communist Party of India (Marxist-Leninist) called for electoral boycott. The CPI(M) on the other hand saw the CPI(ML) as a pawn of Congress(R) to sabotage its chances of winning power in the state. Across the state CPI(M) and CPI(ML) confronted each other; CPI(M) claimed that the CPI(ML) had killed some 200 of its cadres.

Three candidates were killed during the electoral campaign; on February 17, 1971 Debdatta Mondal (Bangla Congress candidate in Ukhra) was killed, on February 20, 1971 the All India Forward Bloc leader and Shyampukur constituency candidate Hemanta Kumar Basu was killed in broad daylight and on March 5, 1971 Pijush Chandra Ghosh (Congress(O) candidate in Dum Dum) was killed. Elections were countermanded in these three constituencies, but in Shyampukur no election was held as Ajit Kumar Biswas (the candidate nominated by the Forward Bloc in lieu of Hemanta Kumar Basu) was killed as well.

== Results ==
1971 West Bengal Legislative Assembly election
Party	Leader	Vote %	Seats	+/–
CPI(M)	Jyoti Basu		113	+33
Congress (R)			105	+50
Communist Party of India			13	−17
Socialist Unity Centre of India			7	0
Indian Union Muslim League			7	+7
Bangla Congress	Ajoy Mukherjee		5	−28
ULF Independents			4	New
All India Forward Bloc			3	−18
Revolutionary Socialist Party			3	−9
Praja Socialist Party			3	−2
Revolutionary Communist Party of India	Sudhindranath Kumar		3	+1
Congress (O)			2	New
Jharkhand Party			2	New
Workers Party of India			2	0
Marxist Forward Bloc			2	+1
All India Gorkha League			2	−2
Bharatiya Jan Sangh			1	+1
Biplobi Bangla Congress			1	New
Samyukta Socialist Party dissident			1	New
This lists parties that won seats. See the complete results below.

== Results by constituency ==
No.	Constituency	Res.	United Left Front (Missing some independent candidates)					United Left Democratic Front (Missing some candidates, such as some of the PSP dissidents)					Congress (R)					Other (Listing the most-voted candidate outside the ULF/ULDF/Cong (R))				
No.	Constituency	Res.	Candidate	Party	Votes	%	Rank	Candidate	Party	Votes	%	Rank	Candidate	Party	Votes	%	Rank	Candidate	Party	Votes	%	Rank
1	Mekliganj	SC	Kshir Prasad Barman	CPI(M)	3996	8.82%	3rd	Mihir Kumar Ray	FB	19880	43.89%	Won	Mani Bhushan Roy	Cong. (R)	15982	35.29%	2nd	Tara Prasanna Ray Basunta	Cong. (O)	3745	8.27%	4th
2	Mathabhanga	SC	Dinesh Chandra Dakua	CPI(M)	18386	38.89%	2nd	Mukunda Nath Barman	FB	2540	5.37%	3rd	Birendra Nath Roy	Cong. (R)	21302	45.06%	Won	Kumar Nidhi Narayan	Cong. (O)	2198	4.65%	4th
3	Cooch Behar West	SC	Sudhir Pramanik	CPI(M)	13749	27.52%	2nd	Dhajendra Barman	FB	6592	13.20%	4th	Rajani Das	Cong. (R)	22565	45.17%	Won	Mubari Moham Paiowary	Cong. (O)	7048	14.11%	3rd
4	Sitai		Sahidar Ramhan	CPI(M)	4329	9.24%	4th	Adhyapak Hiften Nag	FB	12244	26.13%	2nd	Md. Fazle Haque	Cong. (R)	20969	44.75%	Won	Monanath Roy Mandai	Cong. (O)	9320	19.89%	3rd
5	Dinhata		Mani Gopal Roy	CPI(M)	4929	9.18%	3rd	Kamal Kanti Guha	FB	21823	40.63%	2nd	Jogesh Chandra Sarkar	Cong. (R)	24249	45.14%	Won	Jahiruddin Mia	Cong. (O)	2714	5.05%	4th
6	Cooch Behar North		Shirendra Narayan Choudhury	CPI(M)	17800	34.66%	2nd	Mohitlal Chakaraborty	FB	6455	12.57%	3rd	Sunil Kar	Cong. (R)	25465	49.58%	Won	Dwijendra Arayan Dutt	Cong. (O)	1075	2.09%	4th
7	Cooch Behar South		Gopal Chandra Saha	CPI(M)	14988	30.25%	2nd	Bimal Kanti Basu	FB	8258	16.67%	3rd	Santosh Kumar Roy	Cong. (R)	21582	43.56%	Won	Sudhir Chandra Miyogi	Cong. (O)	3182	6.42%	4th
8	Tufanganj	SC	Manindranath Barma	CPI(M)	18573	34.21%	2nd	Dol Mohan Pakhadhara	FB	4556	8.39%	3rd	Sishir Kumar Isore	Cong. (R)	28678	52.82%	Won	Narendra Barman	Cong. (O)	2488	4.58%	4th
9	Kumargram		Netai Chandra Das	CPI(M)	7984	21.11%	2nd	Dhirendra Chandra Sarker	FB	3261	8.62%	5th	Pijush Kanti Mukherjee	Cong. (R)	16619	43.94%	Won	Anima Hmare	Cong. (O)	4089	10.81%	3rd
10	Kalchini	ST						Emanuonmelmon Kujur	FB	2239	8.13%	4th	Denis Lakra	Cong. (R)	10681	38.76%	Won	John Arther Baxia Uraon	PSP	8743	31.73%	2nd
11	Alipurduars		Ranjit Das Gupta	CPI(M)	11219	22.95%	2nd	Sachindra Nath Ganguly	SSP	929	1.90%	5th	Narayan Bhattacharya	Cong. (R)	20455	41.84%	Won	Nani Bhattacharya	RSP	10990	22.48%	3rd
12	Falakata	SC	Abhoya Charan Barman	CPI(M)	11415	28.05%	2nd	Nrikendra Narayan	SSP	4885	12.00%	3rd	Jagdananda Roy	Cong. (R)	13410	32.95%	Won	Panchanan Mallick	Ind.	4302	10.57%	4th
13	Madarihat	ST	Bilash Bhagat	CPI(M)	2917	7.86%	5th	Mahali Budhram	SSP	3444	9.28%	4th	Paban Kumar Roy	Cong. (R)	7569	20.39%	3rd	A. H. Besterwitch	RSP	12291	33.10%	Won
14	Dhupguri		Suresh Chandra Day	CPI(M)	7054	17.85%	3rd	Anildhar Guha Neogi	SSP	11279	28.54%	2nd	Bhawani Paul	Cong. (R)	11471	29.03%	Won	Wayezuddin Ahmed	Ind.	5321	13.47%	4th
15	Nagrakata	ST	Punai Oraon	CPI(M)	22811	57.81%	Won						Azios Lakra	Cong. (R)	9542	24.18%	2nd	Soma Oraon	Ind.	4962	12.58%	3rd
16	Mainaguri	SC	Nilcharan Roy	CPI(M)	3851	10.54%	4th	Basant Kumar Roy	CPI	2328	6.37%	6th	Bijoy Krishna Mohanta	Cong. (R)	12781	34.97%	Won	Haripada Roy	Ind.	6075	16.62%	2nd
17	Mal	ST	Jagarnath Oraon	CPI(M)	9640	23.52%	2nd	Arjun Oraon	CPI	9006	21.97%	3rd	Antoni Toppno	Cong. (R)	13383	32.65%	Won	Guruchanran Oraon	PSP	3349	8.17%	4th
18	Jalpaiguri		Parswh Chandra Mitra	CPI(M)	14520	28.28%	2nd	Kanu Chakrobarty	CPI	7551	14.71%	3rd	Anupam Sen	Cong. (R)	25608	49.88%	Won	Girish Chandra Deb Singha	Ind.	1928	3.76%	4th
19	Rajganj	SC	Dhirendra Nath Roy	CPI(M)	10345	30.93%	2nd	Bhabendra Nath Roy Hakm	SSP	4118	12.31%	3rd	Bhagwan Singh Roy	Cong. (R)	11796	35.27%	Won	Jiban Roy	Cong. (O)	3032	9.07%	4th
20	Kalimpong		Rama Shankar Prosad	CPI(M)	4718	16.63%	4th	Madan Kumar Prodhan	GL	10810	38.09%	Won	Sonam Wangdi Rhotia	Cong. (R)	4841	17.06%	3rd	Padma Lakshmi Subba	Ind.	7388	26.04%	2nd
21	Darjeeling		Rajendra Kumar Sinha	CPI(M)	8042	25.00%	3rd	Deo Prakash Rai	GL	14998	46.62%	Won	Madan Kumar Thapa	Cong. (R)	9133	28.39%	2nd					
22	Jore Bungalow		Ananda Prasad Pathak	CPI(M)	12858	38.57%	Won	Nandalal Gurung	GL	12572	37.72%	2nd	P. B. Gurung	Cong. (R)	6341	19.02%	3rd	Indra Bahadur Thakuri	Cong. (O)	1562	4.69%	4th
23	Siliguri		Biren Bose	CPI(M)	12268	29.89%	2nd	Ramjit Chatterjee	CPI	5645	13.75%	3rd	Arun Kumar Moitra	Cong. (R)	20764	50.59%	Won	Padawa Lawa	Ind.	1339	3.26%	4th
24	Phansidewa	ST	Patras Minz	CPI(M)	14678	33.35%	2nd	Gopal Hansda	FB	3415	7.76%	3rd	Iswar Chandra Tirkey	Cong. (R)	19259	43.76%	Won	Oraon Marianus Tigga	BC	2169	4.93%	4th
25	Chopra		Bachcha Munshi	CPI(M)	12794	32.33%	2nd	Thakur Prembihari	FB	4163	10.52%	4th	Chowdhury Abdul Karim	Cong. (R)	15757	39.82%	Won	Aziz Ahamed	PML	4411	11.15%	3rd
26	Goalpokhar		Nasiruddin	CPI(M)	1697	5.38%	4th	Ishaque	SSP	1556	4.97%	5th	Seikh Sharafat Hossain	Cong. (R)	10953	34.74%	Won	Nizamuddin	PML	9410	29.85%	2nd
27	Karandighi		Abdul Hafiz	CPI(M)	5631	12.77%	3rd	Suresh Chandra Singha	FB	11374	25.79%	2nd	Hazi Sajjad Hossain	Cong. (R)	20715	46.97%	Won	Singha Gopinath	Cong. (O)	3592	8.15%	4th
28	Raiganj		Manash Roy	CPI(M)	21917	44.34%	2nd						Ramendra Nath Dutta	Cong. (R)	23924	48.40%	Won	Nishitha Nath Kundu	PSP	2244	4.54%	3rd
29	Kaliaganj	SC	Nani Gopai Roy	CPI(M)	11603	29.29%	2nd	Sarkar Amritalal	CPI	3000	7.57%	3rd	Roy Debendra Nath	Cong. (R)	21968	55.46%	Won	Syama Prasad Barman	Cong. (O)	1648	4.16%	4th
30	Itahar		Hari Charan Debnath	CPI(M)	12541	24.58%	2nd	Chakrapavarty Sachtndu	CPI	6308	12.36%	3rd	Abedin Zainal	Cong. (R)	30221	59.23%	Won	Deb Kumar Roy	Cong. (O)	1952	3.83%	4th
31	Kushmandi	SC	Ashananda Sarkar	CPI(M)	4595	11.59%	4th	Sarker Bhupal Chandra	CPI	7440	18.76%	2nd	Roy Jatindpa Mohan	Cong. (R)	20988	52.93%	Won	Roy Jogendra Nath	RSP	5009	12.63%	3rd
32	Gangarampur		Ahindra Sarkar	CPI(M)	13256	28.31%	2nd						Ahmed Moslehuddin	Cong. (R)	26440	56.46%	Won	Parik Sankar Lal	BC	4061	8.67%	3rd
33	Kumarganj		Jamini Kishore Mojumdar	CPI(M)	17382	35.65%	2nd	Sarkar Rahimuddin	CPI	2427	4.98%	5th	Probodh Kumar Singh Roy	Cong. (R)	18829	38.62%	Won	Abdul Jabbar Mian	RSP	6142	12.60%	3rd
34	Balurghat							Chattopadhay Jyotirmoy	CPI	3960	7.27%	3rd	Bireswar Roy	Cong. (R)	25109	46.09%	Won	Jatin Chakraborty	RSP	22941	42.11%	2nd
35	Tapan	ST	Dibu Mukmu	CPI(M)	7429	14.36%	3rd	Rabindra Nath Murum	CPI	3103	6.00%	4th	Patrash Hemram	Cong. (R)	21981	42.49%	Won	Oraon Bandhu	RSP	18456	35.68%	2nd
36	Habibpur	ST	Sarkar Murmu	Ind.	15767	34.29%	Won	Sibnath Pramanik	CPI	6383	13.88%	4th	Boila Murmu	Cong. (R)	14307	31.11%	2nd	Jahan Hemrom	Cong. (O)	7183	15.62%	3rd
37	Gajol	ST	Suphal Murmu	CPI(M)	19243	44.63%	Won	Budhrai Besra	CPI	3863	8.96%	4th						Benjamin Hembrom	BC	14777	34.27%	2nd
38	Kharba		Golam Yazdani	CPI(M)	29283	53.65%	Won						Mahabubul Haque	Cong. (R)	22862	41.89%	2nd	Saiyed Ali	Ind.	1049	1.92%	3rd
39	Harishchandrapur		Md. Elias Razi	WPI	26390	54.26%	Won						Bishnubrata Bhattacharya	Cong. (R)	1410	2.90%	3rd	Birendra Kumar Mitra	Cong. (O)	19441	39.97%	2nd
40	Ratua		Mohammad Ali	CPI(M)	16520	41.48%	2nd	Asahaque	CPI	2293	5.76%	4th	Niren Chandra Sinha	Cong. (R)	17139	43.03%	Won	Md. Naimuddin Biswas	Cong. (O)	2597	6.52%	3rd
41	Malda		Mohammad Flias	CPI(M)	12154	27.57%	2nd	Mahammad Bafatuila Mai	CPI	6401	14.52%	3rd	Mahammad Gafurur Rahaman	Cong. (R)	17580	39.88%	Won	Gokul Behari Agarwalla	Cong. (O)	3425	7.77%	4th
42	English Bazar		Sailendu Jha Manik	CPI(M)	10287	22.74%	3rd	Bimal Kanti Das	CPI	14290	31.59%	Won	Nikil Bihari Gupta	Cong. (R)	7782	17.21%	4th	Hari Prasanna Misra	BJS	12063	26.67%	2nd
43	Manikchak		Sudhendu Jha Manik	CPI(M)	12046	29.02%	2nd	Durga Prosad Sen	CPI	10561	25.44%	3rd	Jokhilal Mondai	Cong. (R)	15467	37.26%	Won	Shaikh Khidir Buksh	Cong. (O)	3437	8.28%	4th
44	Suzapur												A. B. A. Ghani Khan Choudhury	Cong. (R)	29291	60.39%	Won	Habibur Rahaman	Ind.	7584	15.64%	2nd
45	Kaliachak		Nuhul Islam	CPI(M)	12994	25.15%	3rd	Jogendranath Sarker	FB	4075	7.89%	4th	Shamsuddin Ahammad	Cong. (R)	18578	35.95%	Won	Promode Ranjan Bose	PSP	14937	28.91%	2nd
46	Farakka		Jerat Ali	CPI(M)	16662	38.61%	Won	Siddique Hossain	SUC	1684	3.90%	4th	Sudhir Kumar Saha	Cong. (R)	7002	16.23%	3rd	Johad Ahmed	Ind.	15849	36.73%	2nd
47	Suti							Habibur Rahman	SUC	2302	4.50%	5th	Md. Sohrab	Cong. (R)	19504	38.15%	Won	Shish Mohammad	RSP	16472	32.22%	2nd
48	Jangipur							Achivtya Singha	SUC	5552	15.40%	4th	Asraf Hossain	Cong. (R)	9168	25.43%	2nd	Badruddin Ahmad	Ind.	9779	27.12%	Won
49	Sagardighi	SC											Atul Chandra Sarkar	Cong. (R)	6898	29.13%	Won	Dasjoychand	RSP	5263	22.23%	2nd
50	Lalgola												Abdus Sattar	Cong. (R)	13377	44.21%	Won	Md. Mozipur Rahman	Ind.	8536	28.21%	2nd
51	Bhagabangola							Rajsingh Dugar	SSP	2276	6.40%	6th	Mohammad Dedar Baksh	Cong. (R)	6877	19.33%	3rd	Md. Samaun Biswas	Ind.	11648	32.74%	Won
52	Nabagram		Birendra Narayan Roy	Ind.	21971	54.95%	Won						Abdul Bapi Biswas	Cong. (R)	11746	29.38%	2nd	Kamal Chand Pandey	RSP	2395	5.99%	3rd
53	Murshidabad		Jarjis Hossain Sarkar	CPI(M)	9765	27.10%	2nd						Mohammad Idris Ali	Cong. (R)	10553	29.28%	Won	Md. Adiluzzaman Saheb	Ind.	6868	19.06%	3rd
54	Jalangi		Atahar Rahaman	CPI(M)	6259	17.71%	3rd						Azizur Rahman	Cong. (R)	5862	16.59%	4th	Prafulla Kumar Sarkar	BJS	11660	33.00%	Won
55	Domkal		Md. Abdul Bari	CPI(M)	17338	41.12%	Won	Md. Ashraf Ali	SUC	4395	10.42%	4th	Biswas Ekram Ul Haque	Cong. (R)	7434	17.63%	3rd	Maidul Isiam Khondakar	Ind.	12078	28.65%	2nd
56	Naoda		Sekh Faizuddin Ahmed	CPI(M)	2957	6.17%	4th						Das Roy Sudhir Kumar	Cong. (R)	2884	6.01%	5th	Nasiruddin Khan	Ind.	22783	47.50%	Won
57	Hariharpara		Sekh Nazrul Islam	CPI(M)	4888	10.66%	3rd						Mainui Islam Biswas	Cong. (R)	4538	9.90%	4th	Aftabuddin Ahmed	Ind.	26301	57.36%	Won
58	Berhampore		Pran Ranjan Chowdhury	CPI(M)	7472	19.69%	2nd	Sanat Kumar Raha	CPI	3236	8.53%	5th	Sankar Das Paui	Cong. (R)	16824	44.34%	Won	Debabrata Bandopadhyay	RSP	5467	14.41%	3rd
59	Beldanga																	Timir Baran Bhaduri	RSP	21805	42.42%	Won
60	Kandi		Damodardas Chattopadhyay	CPI(M)	7861	18.06%	3rd	Gurupada Choudhury	CPI	3648	8.38%	5th	Atish Chandra Sinha	Cong. (R)	16732	38.43%	Won	Mirza Ajahap	Ind.	9080	20.86%	2nd
61	Khargram	SC	Dinabandhu Hajhi	CPI(M)	9538	26.64%	2nd	Samapendra Kumar Choudhury	CPI	4522	12.63%	4th	Narendra Haldar	Cong. (R)	9557	26.69%	Won	Guru Pada Das	Ind.	4830	13.49%	3rd
62	Barwan												Ghosh Moulik Sunil Mohan	Cong. (R)	15140	41.97%	Won	Amalendralal Roy	RSP	9281	25.73%	2nd
63	Bharatpur		Khondekor Mdnure Ahasan	CPI(M)	13714	35.37%	Won						Kumar Jagadish Chanddra Sinh	Cong. (R)	9486	24.47%	2nd	Khondekar Makaram Hosen	Ind.	6600	17.02%	4th
64	Karimpur		Samarendra Nath Sanyal	CPI(M)	22489	47.65%	Won						Nalinaksha Sanyal	Cong. (R)	11143	23.61%	2nd	Mondal Hazi Abuzarghaffari	SML	9649	20.44%	3rd
65	Tehatta		Madhabendu Mohanta	CPI(M)	20383	46.49%	Won						Khan Surat Ali	Cong. (R)	9390	21.42%	2nd	Kazi Md. Mowla Boksh	Ind.	8188	18.68%	3rd
66	Kaliganj		Mir Fakir Mohammed	Ind.	10686	26.94%	Won	Gurudas Sikdar	CPI	2253	5.68%	6th	Armanali Munshi	Cong. (R)	5162	13.01%	4th	Mohammed Islam Molla	Ind.	9047	22.81%	2nd
67	Nakashipara	SC	Harendra Baidya	CPI(M)	8145	20.03%	3rd	Guneswar Maitra	CPI	2688	6.61%	6th						Govindo Chandra Mondal	Ind.	10826	26.63%	Won
68	Chapra		Sahabuddin Mondal	CPI(M)	17047	41.08%	Won						Jagannath Morumder	Cong. (R)	6989	16.84%	4th	Abu Bakkar Mondal	Ind.	7804	18.81%	2nd
69	Nabadwip		Debi Prasad Basu	CPI(M)	28242	55.81%	Won						Joy Guru Goswami	Cong. (R)	9849	19.46%	3rd	Sachindra Mohan Nandi	Cong. (O)	11011	21.76%	2nd
70	Krishnagar West		Amritendu Mukherjee	CPI(M)	20003	50.79%	Won	Depesh Sinha	CPI	4390	11.15%	3rd	Bhattacharya Mohader Chandr	Cong. (R)	10257	26.04%	2nd	Md. Mozammel Hoquf Nandai	SML	2204	5.60%	4th
71	Krishnagar East		Sadhan Chattopadhyay	CPI(M)	11785	31.75%	2nd											Kashi Kanta Maitra	Ind.	18139	48.86%	Won
72	Hanskhali	SC	Jnanendra Nath Biswas	CPI(M)	18638	35.82%	2nd	Ramendra Nath Das	CPI	4206	8.08%	4th	Ananda Mohan Biswas	Cong. (R)	23658	45.47%	Won	Charu Mihir Sarkar	BC	4574	8.79%	3rd
73	Santipur		Bimalananda Mukherjee	RCPI	16818	39.73%	Won	M. Mokshed Ali	Ind.	3744	8.84%	3rd	Asaamanha De	Cong. (R)	16530	39.05%	2nd	Kanai Pal	Ind.	2920	6.90%	4th
74	Ranaghat		Kundu Gour Chandra	CPI(M)	30835	48.95%	Won						Binoy Kumar Chattopadyay	Cong. (R)	29350	46.59%	2nd	Kalida Ghosh	RSP	1753	2.78%	3rd
75	Rangaghat East	SC	Biswas Naresh Chandra	CPI(M)	18558	37.60%	Won	Nitaipada Sarkar	CPI	13282	26.91%	3rd	Sushil Kumar Roy	Cong. (R)	16274	32.98%	2nd	Santosh Kumar Mondal	Cong. (O)	888	1.80%	4th
76	Chakdah		Subhash Chandra Basu	CPI(M)	29301	50.90%	Won	Barada Mukutmoni	CPI	4479	7.78%	4th						Sural Chandra Mandal	BC	16561	28.77%	2nd
77	Haringhata		Malakar Nani Gopal	CPI(M)	27967	48.62%	Won	Minati Thakur	FB	3750	6.52%	3rd	Manas Kumar Ganguly	Cong. (R)	25374	44.11%	2nd	Suarajit Banerjee	Cong. (O)	434	0.75%	4th
78	Bagdaha	SC	Kanti Chandra Biswas	CPI(M)	14581	35.91%	2nd	Apurba Lal Majumder	FB	19851	48.89%	Won						Mrinalini Biswas	BC	5608	13.81%	3rd
79	Bongaon		Ranjit Mitra	CPI(M)	17262	38.44%	2nd	Ajit Kumar Ganguly	CPI	20172	44.92%	Won						Nirmal Rai Choudhari	BC	4933	10.99%	3rd
80	Gaighata		Keshab Lal Biswas	CPI(M)	14822	32.42%	2nd	Gorinda Deb	CPI	11459	25.06%	3rd	Chandi Pada Mitra	Cong. (R)	17208	37.63%	Won	Sachinder Nath Ghosh	Cong. (O)	1835	4.01%	4th
81	Ashokenagar		Nani Kar	CPI(M)	20909	43.10%	Won	Sadhan Kumar Sen	CPI	10633	21.92%	3rd	Keshab Chandra Bhattacharya	Cong. (R)	15655	32.27%	2nd	Azizar Rahaman Dafadar	Cong. (O)	1022	2.11%	4th
82	Barasat		Sailesh Das Gupta	CPI(M)	16512	31.76%	2nd	Saral Deb	FB	17896	34.43%	Won						Abdur Bashid Malick	Ind.	8630	16.60%	3rd
83	Rajarhat	SC	Rabindra Nath Mondal	CPI(M)	21968	38.62%	2nd	Bijoy Lal Majumdar	FB	3743	6.58%	3rd	Khagendra Nath Mondal	Cong. (R)	26658	46.87%	Won	Sachindra Nath Ray	Ind.	3393	5.97%	4th
84	Deganga							Tulsi Charan Ghose	CPI	7279	16.78%	3rd	M. Sawkftali	Cong. (R)	9191	21.19%	2nd	Harun Or-Rashid	Ind.	20142	46.44%	Won
85	Habra		Hemanta Ghoshai	CPI(M)	15085	28.16%	2nd						Tarun Kanti Ghosh	Cong. (R)	28224	52.68%	Won	Sk. Sahasuzzaman	Ind.	8048	15.02%	3rd
86	Swarupnagar		Gopal Chandra Goswami	CPI(M)	9032	17.99%	3rd	Jaminiranjan Sen	CPI	11941	23.78%	2nd	Chandranath Misra	Cong. (R)	24538	48.86%	Won	Alauddin Mondal	Ind.	3783	7.53%	4th
87	Baduria		Shrikh Ali Ahmad	CPI(M)	13163	29.27%	2nd	Aktarul Haque Khan	CPI	3199	7.11%	4th	Ghazi Abdul Gaffar	Cong. (R)	23117	51.40%	Won	Molla Nasirulla Haque	Ind.	3543	7.88%	3rd
88	Basirhat		Narayan Mukherjee	CPI(M)	7705	21.14%	2nd	Arun Kumar Basu	CPI	4953	13.59%	4th	Lalit Kumar Ghosh	Cong. (R)	18009	49.42%	Won	Md. Siddique Ahmad	Ind.	5050	13.86%	3rd
89	Hasnabad		Bimal Kumar Sengupta	CPI(M)	8162	22.41%	2nd	Abdur Razzaque Khan	CPI	5884	16.16%	3rd	Molla Tasmatulla	Cong. (R)	18398	50.52%	Won	Chowdhury Fazlul Ali	Ind.	2893	7.94%	4th
90	Hingalganj	SC	Gopal Chandra Gayen	CPI(M)	12554	27.28%	Won	Benode Behari Gayen	CPI	10618	23.07%	3rd						Panchanan Mondal	Cong. (O)	11497	24.98%	2nd
91	Gosaba	SC	Kalipataru Barman	CPI(M)	5482	10.17%	3rd	Raman Nath Patro	SUC	584	1.08%	6th	Paresh Chandra Baidya	Cong. (R)	22663	42.06%	2nd	Ganesh Chandra Mondal	RSP	23571	43.74%	Won
92	Sandeshkhali	ST	Sarat Sarder	CPI(M)	20053	40.68%	Won	Gopal Chandra Mondal	CPI	4814	9.77%	3rd	Debendra Nath Sinha	Cong. (R)	20006	40.59%	2nd	Dhiren Sarder	RSP	3158	6.41%	4th
93	Haroa	SC	Jagannath Sarder	CPI(M)	13512	34.31%	2nd	Shanipada Mondal	CPI	3541	8.99%	3rd	Gangadhar Pramanick	Cong. (R)	17106	43.43%	Won	Prasanta Kumar Mondal	Ind.	3403	8.64%	4th
94	Basanti		Daud Khan	CPI(M)	14253	25.44%	2nd	Ajit Kumar Naskar	SUC	1684	3.91%	5th	Panchanan Sinha	Cong. (R)	17643	31.49%	Won	Ashoke Chandhuri	RSP	12354	22.05%	3rd
95	Canning	SC	Chitta Ranjan Mridha	CPI(M)	19862	36.68%	2nd	Dulal Chandra Mondal	SUC	11944	22.06%	3rd	Gobinda Chandra Naskar	Cong. (R)	20015	36.96%	Won	Chandra Kanta Ray	BC	1808	3.34%	4th
96	Kultali	SC	Gangadhar Naskar	CPI(M)	7723	12.79%	3rd	Prabodh Purkait	SUC	26705	44.22%	Won	Arabinda Naskar	Cong. (R)	25364	42.00%	2nd	Bharat Chandra Halder	Cong. (O)	374	0.62%	4th
97	Jaynagar		Arun Kumar Ghosh	CPI(M)	3572	6.15%	4th	Subodh Banerjee	SUC	23904	41.19%	Won	Prosun Kumar Ghosh	Cong. (R)	23656	40.76%	2nd	Hajimoksedur Rahman Molia	Ind.	6903	11.89%	3rd
98	Baruipur	SC	Bimal Mistry	CPI(M)	19711	36.12%	Won	Kumar Ranjan Mondal	SSP	6164	11.30%	4th	Ram Kanta Mandal	Cong. (R)	19265	35.30%	2nd	Promatha Sardar	Ind.	8578	15.72%	3rd
99	Sonarpur	SC	Gangadhar Naskar	CPI(M)	30007	54.21%	Won	Amartedra Nath Naskar	CPI	14036	25.36%	2nd	Gour Hari Sardar	Cong. (R)	10875	19.65%	3rd	Bikas Chandra Mandal	Cong. (O)	434	0.78%	4th
100	Bhanagar		Abdur Razzak Molla	CPI(M)	10415	23.54%	2nd	Lateman Ait Molla	CPI	10415	23.54%	3rd	Mochtesham Hossain	Cong. (R)	7343	16.60%	4th	A K M Hassan Uzzaman	Ind.	10868	24.56%	Won
101	Jadavpur		Dinesh Majumder	CPI(M)	38114	57.57%	Won	Santimoy Roy	CPI	19170	28.96%	2nd						Bama Charan Chakrabarty	RSP	4793	7.24%	3rd
102	Behala East		Niranjan Mukherjee	CPI(M)	21817	52.37%	Won						Birenghatak	Cong. (R)	18049	43.33%	2nd	Prafullla Kumar Roy	Cong. (O)	1790	4.30%	3rd
103	Behala West		Rabin Mukherjee	CPI(M)	30053	50.97%	Won	Biswanath Chakraborty	CPI	25394	43.07%	2nd						Bhaben Roy Chowdhury	Cong. (O)	3517	5.96%	3rd
104	Garden Reach		Chhedi Lal	CPI(M)	15493	33.96%	2nd	Arun Sen	CPI	12649	27.72%	3rd	S M. Abduliam	Cong. (R)	15582	34.15%	Won	Md Abdul Bagt	Ind.	1393	3.05%	4th
105	Maheshtola		Sudhir Chandra Bhandari	CPI(M)	24152	44.77%	Won						Bhupen Bijai	Cong. (R)	22785	42.24%	2nd	Monsur Ali	Ind.	7006	12.99%	3rd
106	Budge Budge		Khitibhusan Roy Barman	CPI(M)	32399	60.64%	Won	Sad Imani Bag	CPI	15602	29.20%	2nd						Rabi Chowdhury	Ind.	2645	4.95%	3rd
107	Bishnupur West		Provash Chandra Roy	CPI(M)	33319	58.73%	Won	Amar Mazumder	FB	1195	2.11%	3rd	Shaik Mqufbul Haque	Cong. (R)	19627	34.59%	2nd	Abdul Hannanmolla	Ind.	1092	1.92%	4th
108	Bishnupur East	SC	Sunder Kumar Naskar	CPI(M)	21971	44.97%	2nd	Samirkumar Mandal	SSP	615	1.26%	4th	Ram Krishna Bar	Cong. (R)	22757	46.58%	Won	Swija Far Mandal	Ind.	2920	5.98%	3rd
109	Falta		Jyotish Roy	CPI(M)	30715	57.53%	Won						Probhat Majhi	Cong. (R)	15346	28.75%	2nd	Md Nasim Ali	Ind.	4841	9.07%	3rd
110	Diamond Harbour		Abdul Quiyom Molla	CPI(M)	30054	50.86%	Won	Khemesh Chandra Bhattachary	FB	693	1.17%	4th	Daulat Ali Seikh	Cong. (R)	27150	45.95%	2nd	Indrajit Mondal	Cong. (O)	1194	2.02%	3rd
111	Magrahat East	SC	Radhika Rajan Pramnik	CPI(M)	23863	39.78%	Won	Anukul Bar	SUC	3345	5.58%	4th	Monoranjan Haldas	Cong. (R)	22216	37.04%	2nd	Madan Mohan Naskar	Ind.	9955	16.60%	3rd
112	Magrahat West		Chhoban Gabl	CPI(M)	19169	33.22%	2nd	Golam Rasul Mollick	SUC	1809	3.14%	6th	Joynal Abdin	Cong. (R)	11108	19.25%	3rd	Sudhendu Mandle	BC	19319	33.48%	Won
113	Kulpi	SC	Mukunda Ram Mondal	CPI(M)	11752	24.36%	Won	Sasankasfkhar Naiya	SUC	8559	17.74%	4th						Santosh Kumar Mondal	Cong. (O)	9800	20.31%	2nd
114	Mathurapur	SC	Subhash Chandra Roy	CPI(M)	2955	5.06%	5th	Renupada Haldar	SUC	24403	41.81%	Won	Birrendra Narth Haldar	Cong. (R)	17875	30.63%	2nd	Hrishikesh Haldar	BC	5456	9.35%	3rd
115	Patharpratima		Gunadhar Maity	CPI(M)	10682	17.00%	2nd	Rabin Mondal	SUC	25808	41.08%	Won	Satya Ranjan Bapuli	Cong. (R)	9345	14.87%	3rd	Phani Bhusan Giri	BC	9148	14.56%	4th
116	Kakdwip		Hrishikesh Maity	CPI(M)	27775	44.66%	Won	Khagen Roy Chowdhury	CPI	6427	10.33%	5th	Badunb Bautya	Cong. (R)	9298	14.95%	3rd	Hanasdwaj Dhara	Cong. (O)	11522	18.53%	2nd
117	Sagar		Pravanjan Kumar Mondal	CPI(M)	25953	41.33%	Won						Trilokesh Misra	Cong. (R)	16740	26.66%	2nd	Gorabhan Dingal	BC	7923	12.62%	3rd
118	Bijpur		Jagadish Chandra Das	CPI(M)	28571	48.93%	2nd						Jagadish Chandra Das	Cong. (R)	29821	51.07%	Won					
119	Naihati		Gopal Basu	CPI(M)	37153	54.39%	Won	Ranjit Kumar Dfy	SSP	858	1.26%	4th						Golokesh Bhattarcharjee	Cong. (O)	2542	3.72%	3rd
120	Bhatrara		Sitaram Gupta	CPI(M)	37603	46.69%	2nd	Shew Kumar Singh	FB	1704	2.12%	3rd	Satyanarayan Singh	Cong. (R)	40173	49.88%	Won	Daraga Singh	Cong. (O)	1053	1.31%	4th
121	Noapara		Jamini Bhusan Saha	CPI(M)	36567	53.41%	Won	Nihar Kumar Bose	FB	13493	19.71%	3rd	Suvendu Roy	Cong. (R)	17371	25.37%	2nd	Chira Ranjan Mitra	Cong. (O)	1030	1.50%	4th
122	Titagarh		Md. Anim	CPI(M)	33119	53.55%	Won						Krishna Kumar Sukla	Cong. (R)	27770	44.90%	2nd	Abani Mohan Das	Cong. (O)	956	1.55%	3rd
123	Khardah		Sadhan Kumar Chakraborty	CPI(M)	35444	52.14%	Won	Gopal Banerjee	CPI	31364	46.14%	2nd						Harshandhari Bhattarcharjee	Cong. (O)	1168	1.72%	3rd
124	Panihati		Gopal Krishna Bhattacher Jee	CPI(M)	58545	66.72%	Won	Nandadulal Srimani	CPI	24279	27.67%	2nd						Kalyan Das Gupta	Cong. (O)	4923	5.61%	3rd
125	Kamarhati		Radhika Ranjan Banerjee	CPI(M)	47359	67.74%	Won	Sunil Mukherjee	CPI	18272	26.14%	2nd						Sushil Kumar Mukhopadhyay	Cong. (O)	4280	6.12%	3rd
126	Baranagar		Jyoti Basu	CPI(M)	43340	57.31%	Won											Ajoy Mukherjee	BC	32287	42.69%	2nd
127	Dum Dum		Tarun Kumar Sen Gupta	CPI(M)	40736	56.01%	Won											Bidyut Kumar Basu	PSP	31423	43.21%	2nd
128	Cossipur		Krishna Gopal Basu	CPI(M)	15855	36.43%	2nd						Prafulla Kanti Ghosh	Cong. (R)	26000	59.74%	Won	Singha Moniprasad	BJS	1162	2.67%	3rd
130	Jorabagan		Chatterjee Haraprasad	CPI(M)	10037	31.70%	2nd						Nepal Chandra Roy	Cong. (R)	20836	65.82%	Won	Dhirendra Nath Modak	BC	785	2.48%	3rd
131	Jorasanko		Das Satyanarayan	CPI(M)	8710	23.00%	2nd	Dhirendra Chandra Bhowmick	FB	1590	4.20%	4th	Deoki Nandan Poddar	Cong. (R)	18621	49.16%	Won	Shyam Sunder Goenka	BJS	8606	22.72%	3rd
132	Bara Bazar		Ajodhya Singh	CPI(M)	6231	15.04%	3rd	Singh Jagdish	SSP	130	0.31%	5th	Ramkrishna Saraogi	Cong. (R)	23047	55.63%	Won	Durga Prasad Nathany	BJS	11717	28.28%	2nd
133	Bow Bazar		Hasim Abdul Halim	CPI(M)	10449	30.43%	2nd	Guha Thakurta Rabindra Nath	FB	979	2.85%	4th	Bijoy Singh Nahar	Cong. (R)	20839	60.69%	Won	Jnanendra Banerjee	BJS	2070	6.03%	3rd
134	Chowringhee		Parbati Prasanna Basu	CPI(M)	7862	26.01%	2nd	Md. Yakub	FB	1743	5.77%	4th	Sankar Ghose	Cong. (R)	16363	54.13%	Won	Asoka Krishna Dutt	Cong. (O)	4259	14.09%	3rd
135	Kabitirtha		Mir Abdus Sayeed	CPI(M)	12036	26.49%	3rd	Kalimuddin Shams	FB	12955	28.52%	2nd	Ram Peyare Ram	Cong. (R)	19372	42.64%	Won	Subir Chowdhury	Cong. (O)	737	1.62%	4th
136	Alipore		Nepal Bhattcharya	CPI(M)	6012	14.84%	3rd	Moni Sanyal	CPI	14296	35.29%	2nd	Kanai Lal Sarkar	Cong. (R)	19021	46.95%	Won	Narayan Prasad Ghosh	Cong. (O)	1045	2.58%	4th
137	Kalighat		Sadhan Gupta	CPI(M)	15956	35.80%	2nd	Satindranath Roy Choudhury	SSP	1280	2.87%	4th	Pathin Talukdar	Cong. (R)	24593	55.18%	Won	Saliln Baran Chatterjee	Cong. (O)	2503	5.62%	3rd
138	Rashbehari Avenue		Sachin Sen	CPI(M)	11529	31.20%	2nd	Bhabesh Ganguly	SUC	2000	5.41%	3rd	Lakshmi Kanta Basu	Cong. (R)	23420	63.38%	Won					
139	Tollygunge		Sastya Priya Roy	CPI(M)	32788	59.05%	Won	Amiya Dasguptaj Maharaj	CPI	18728	33.73%	2nd						Jatindra Mohan Mazumder	BC	4013	7.23%	3rd
140	Dhakuria		Haridas Malaker	CPI(M)	17854	37.52%	2nd	Somnath Lahiri	CPI	25912	54.45%	Won						Basuder Chatterjee	Cong. (O)	3824	8.04%	3rd
141	Ballygunge		Jyotibhushan Bhattacharya	WPI	13943	38.42%	2nd	Menoka Basu Roy	SUC	704	1.94%	4th	Subrata Mukherjee	Cong. (R)	17655	48.65%	Won	Nilratan Sinha	RSP	3541	9.76%	3rd
142	Beliaghata South	SC	Monorajan Boral	CPI(M)	15301	44.23%	2nd	Santi Ranjan Mondal	CPI	2300	6.65%	3rd	Ardhendu Sekhar Naskar	Cong. (R)	16990	49.12%	Won					
143	Entally		Mohammed Nizamuddin	CPI(M)	15581	44.61%	Won	A.M.O. Ghani	CPI	12478	35.73%	2nd						Asoka Kumar Bagchi	Cong. (O)	4362	12.49%	3rd
144	Taltola		Abul Hassan	CPI(M)	13217	44.28%	2nd						Abdur Rauf Anasari	Cong. (R)	14565	48.80%	Won	Hakim Abunasr Burauni	Ind.	1245	4.17%	3rd
145	Sealdah		Sundhansul Palit	CPI(M)	10966	28.42%	2nd	Nanda Gopal Bhattacherjee	CPI	3369	8.73%	3rd	Benoy Banerjee	Cong. (R)	20847	54.03%	Won	Barendra Krishna Dah	RSP	1922	4.98%	4th
146	Vidyasagar		Samar Kumar Badra	CPI(M)	12418	35.51%	2nd	Chandi Kukherjee	CPI	3386	9.68%	3rd	Sham Sufzzoha	Cong. (R)	17539	50.16%	Won	Sushobhan Banerjee	Cong. (O)	1026	2.93%	4th
147	Beliaghatya North		Krishna Pada Ghose	CPI(M)	23318	53.40%	Won	Subodh Kumar Dey	FB	20345	46.60%	2nd										
148	Manicktola		Anila Debi	CPI(M)	16773	39.60%	Won	Ila Mitra	CPI	9214	21.75%	3rd	Ananta Kumar Bharati	Cong. (R)	15682	37.02%	2nd	Santi Panjan Sinha Roy	Cong. (O)	691	1.63%	4th
149	Burtola		Lakeshmi Kanta Dey	CPI(M)	10035	27.15%	2nd						Ajit Kumar Panja	Cong. (R)	19793	53.54%	Won	Nikhil Das	RSP	3633	9.83%	3rd
150	Belgachia		Lakshmi Charan Sen	CPI(M)	25012	52.94%	Won						Ganapati Sur	Cong. (R)	22235	47.06%	2nd					
151	Balty		Patit Paban Pathak	CPI(M)	24233	51.25%	Won	Rameswar Tiwari	SSP	292	0.62%	5th	Bhabani Sankar Mukherjee	Cong. (R)	19060	40.31%	2nd	Trak Nath Banerjee	Cong. (O)	2711	5.73%	3rd
152	Howram North		Chittabrata Mazumdar	CPI(M)	18774	42.59%	2nd	Autobida Ghosal	FB	856	1.94%	3rd	Sankar Lal Mukherjee	Cong. (R)	23353	52.98%	Won	Dwijendra Lal Ghosh	Ind.	591	1.34%	4th
153	Howrah Central		Sudhindranath Kumar	RCPI	12616	39.80%	Won	Anadi Das	Ind.	2711	8.55%	4th						Saradindu Sekhar Sett	Cong. (O)	10407	32.83%	2nd
154	Howrah South		Pralay Talukdar	CPI(M)	16618	39.03%	2nd	Suprabhat Mukherjee	CPI	5626	13.21%	3rd	Santi Kumar Das Gupta	Cong. (R)	18919	44.44%	Won	Susil Kumar Ghose	Cong. (O)	1412	3.32%	4th
155	Shibpur		Harisadhan Mitra	CPI(M)	17240	39.11%	Won	Kanai Lal Bhattacharya	FB	13491	30.61%	2nd	Asoke Kumar Mullack	Cong. (R)	9704	22.02%	3rd	Ashis Roy	Cong. (O)	3052	6.92%	4th
156	Domjur		Joykesh Mukher Jee	CPI(M)	34485	60.32%	Won						Rebati Ranjan Mukhopadhyay	Cong. (R)	15568	27.23%	2nd	Amjan Ali Sardar	BC	4384	7.67%	3rd
157	Jagatballavpur		Tarapada Dey	CPI(M)	27541	56.92%	Won	Arun Kumar Bag	SSP	533	1.10%	6th	Panna Lal Sit	Cong. (R)	11855	24.50%	2nd	Chitta Ranjan Khanna	Cong. (O)	3548	7.33%	3rd
158	Panchla		Asoke Kumar Ghosh	CPI(M)	22644	44.87%	Won	Bibhuti Bhusan Ghosh	FB	20459	40.54%	2nd						Akbar Ali Mistri	Ind.	5182	10.27%	3rd
159	Sankrail	SC	Haran Chandra Hazra	CPI(M)	25386	52.27%	Won	Dulal Chandra Mondal	CPI	6570	13.53%	3rd	Arabinda Naskar	Cong. (R)	13527	27.85%	2nd	Dwinjendra Nath Bachhar	Cong. (O)	3083	6.35%	4th
160	Uluberia North	SC	Rajkumar Mandal	CPI(M)	32006	52.10%	Won	Kalipada Mandal	FB	19758	32.16%	2nd	Gobinda Ch Singh	Cong. (R)	8908	14.50%	3rd	Joydeb Sikari	Cong. (O)	760	1.24%	4th
161	Uluberia South		Batakrishna Das	CPI(M)	22491	41.56%	Won	Biswanath Das Ghosh	FB	10990	20.31%	3rd	Durgasankar Roy	Cong. (R)	11984	22.14%	2nd	Molla Fazlul Haque	Ind.	6383	11.79%	4th
162	Shyampur		Susil Kumar Dinda	CPI(M)	13606	23.17%	3rd	Sasabindu Bera	FB	20381	34.71%	2nd	Sisir Kumar Sen	Cong. (R)	22633	38.55%	Won	Mukundaram Das	Cong. (O)	2094	3.57%	4th
163	Bagnan		Nirupama Chattar Jee	CPI(M)	27764	53.27%	Won						Amalendu Bikas Maity	Cong. (R)	17281	33.16%	2nd	Sukumar Mitra	BC	7076	13.58%	3rd
164	Kalyanpur		Nataj Adak	CPI(M)	20474	39.11%	Won	Santiprasad Mandal	FB	5111	9.76%	3rd	Barindra Nath Ghose	Cong. (R)	12952	24.74%	2nd	Prasad Chakravarty	BJS	4561	8.71%	4th
165	Amta		Bapindra Koley	CPI(M)	30671	61.14%	Won						Gunkar Singh	Cong. (R)	11717	23.36%	2nd	Gobinda Maji	PSP	5602	11.17%	3rd
166	Udaynarayanpur		Pannalal Maji	CPI(M)	31069	59.83%	Won						Abdul Karim Mallik	Cong. (R)	18609	35.84%	2nd	Bhudeb Mallick	Cong. (O)	2248	4.33%	3rd
167	Jangipara		Manindra Nath Jana	CPI(M)	22677	48.96%	Won	Sushil Chattopadhyaya	CPI	4278	9.24%	4th	Ganesh Hatui	Cong. (R)	13926	30.07%	2nd	Sanatan Bhar	BC	5433	11.73%	3rd
168	Chanditala		Kaji Safiulla	CPI(M)	16562	49.42%	Won	Sudhanosu Das	FB	2145	6.40%	5th	Sk Sahadat Ali	Cong. (R)	6807	20.31%	2nd	Mohamed Abdul Latif	Ind.	3308	9.87%	3rd
169	Uttarpara		Santosri Chattopadhyay	CPI(M)	29473	56.09%	Won	Gobinda Chatterji	CPI	17022	32.40%	2nd						Kasinath Banerjee	Cong. (O)	6048	11.51%	3rd
170	Seranpore		Kamal Krishna Bhattacharja	CPI(M)	21467	36.94%	2nd	Panchu Gopal Bhahuri	CPI	8983	15.46%	3rd	Gopal Das Nag	Cong. (R)	26344	45.34%	Won	Durgasankar Sanyal Shyamal	Cong. (O)	1312	2.26%	4th
171	Champdani		Hari Pada Mukherjee	CPI(M)	23210	47.89%	Won	Girija Bhushan Mukhopadhyya	CPI	10244	21.14%	3rd	Nisith Kamal Sanyai	Cong. (R)	12916	26.65%	2nd	Bvomkesh Mazumdar	Cong. (O)	2093	4.32%	4th
172	Chandernagore		Bhabani Mukherjee	CPI(M)	31322	54.86%	Won						Bepin Behari Sav	Cong. (R)	18734	32.81%	2nd	Dinesh Ranjan Mukherjee	Ind.	4813	8.43%	3rd
173	Singur		Gopal Bandopadhyay	CPI(M)	21658	39.48%	2nd	Ajit Kumar Bosu	CPI	24108	43.95%	Won	Ajit Bhattacharyya	Cong. (R)	7990	14.57%	3rd	Jamini Kumar Bag	BC	1099	2.00%	4th
174	Haripal		Chittaranjan Bose	WPI	22594	49.89%	Won	Amales Chandra Mazumdr	SSP	3148	6.95%	3rd	Adhirkumar Ghose	Cong. (R)	16829	37.16%	2nd	Sailendra Nath Chattopadhy	Cong. (O)	2717	6.00%	4th
175	Chinsurah		Amiya Kumar Nandy	CPI(M)	23274	43.64%	2nd	Sambhu Ghosh	FB	6050	11.34%	3rd	Bhupati Majumdar	Cong. (R)	23511	44.08%	Won	Biswaranjan Sengupta	Ind.	500	0.94%	4th
176	Polba		Broja Gopal Neogi	CPI(M)	24195	46.61%	Won	Subhendu Singha Roy	FB	1894	3.65%	4th	Bhawani Prosad Sinha Roy	Cong. (R)	20095	38.71%	2nd	Sheikh Abdul Sobhan	Cong. (O)	3048	5.87%	3rd
177	Balagarh	SC	Abinash Pramanik	CPI(M)	22740	47.53%	Won	Santosh Kumar Bharati	CPI	4904	10.25%	3rd	Biren Sarkar	Cong. (R)	18778	39.25%	2nd	Narayan Chandra Sardar	JKP	954	1.99%	4th
178	Pandua		Dernarayan Chakrabarty	CPI(M)	28949	56.38%	Won						Anwar Hossain Molla	Cong. (R)	3223	6.28%	3rd	Sailendra Chottopadhya	BC	18274	35.59%	2nd
179	Dhaniakhali	SC	Kasinath Roy	CPI(M)	23911	46.39%	Won	Krip Sindhu Saha	FB	3883	7.53%	3rd	Kashinath Patra	Cong. (R)	20318	39.42%	2nd	Gokul Chandra Maji	BC	3428	6.65%	4th
180	Tarakeswar		Ram Chatterjee	MFB	28289	55.71%	Won	Mansha Ram Samanta	FB	656	1.29%	5th	Ram Sinha Pal	Cong. (R)	13308	26.21%	2nd	Mityanada Adikary	Cong. (O)	5401	10.64%	3rd
181	Pursurah		Mrinal Majumder	CPI(M)	13953	26.78%	2nd	Gour Ganguly	CPI	9503	18.24%	3rd	Mahadev Mukhopadhyay	Cong. (R)	22096	42.42%	Won	Bhola Natu Mazumdar	Cong. (O)	6542	12.56%	4th
182	Khanakul	SC	Madan Saha	CPI(M)	19153	41.77%	Won	Bistu Pada Roy	FB	1694	3.69%	5th	Basudev Hazra	Cong. (R)	15117	32.97%	2nd	Tinkori Bar	BC	6216	13.56%	3rd
183	Arambagh		Chattopadhyay Sastiram	CPI(M)	14899	29.67%	2nd	Rabindra Nath Roy	FB	1864	3.71%	4th						Prafulla Chandra Sen	Cong. (O)	30429	60.60%	Won
184	Goghat	SC	Radha Nath Das	CPI(M)	8799	24.15%	2nd	Ajit Kumar Biswas	FB	8725	23.94%	3rd	Madan Mohan Medda	Cong. (R)	11261	30.90%	Won	Nanu Ram Roy	Cong. (O)	5791	15.89%	4th
185	Chandrakona		Choudhury Soroshi	CPI(M)	20474	42.54%	Won	Satya Ghosal	CPI	11293	23.46%	3rd	Suhas Dutta Roy	Cong. (R)	14191	29.49%	2nd	Mukhopadhyay Satya Gopal	Cong. (O)	2169	4.51%	4th
186	Ghatal	SC	Dal Nanda Rani	CPI(M)	28725	59.45%	Won											Kariik Dolui	BC	18207	37.68%	2nd
187	Daspur		Bhattachariya Mrigendra	CPI(M)	21174	37.64%	2nd	Madhusudan Manik	CPI	6338	11.27%	3rd	Sudhir Chandra Bera	Cong. (R)	25282	44.94%	Won	Sashadhar Chakrabertty	Cong. (O)	3213	5.71%	4th
188	Panskura West		Monoranjan Roy	CPI(M)	6420	12.01%	4th	Sk. Omar Ali	CPI	20984	39.25%	Won	Chitta Ranjan Chakravarty	Cong. (R)	12448	23.28%	2nd	Balai Charan Mandal	BC	7211	13.49%	3rd
189	Panskura East		Gajendra Nath Shfe	CPI(M)	6901	13.91%	3rd	Geeta Mukherjee	CPI	27012	54.45%	Won						Birbhadra Gouri	BC	7886	15.90%	2nd
190	Moyna		Pulak Bera	CPI(M)	13578	23.87%	3rd	Kanai Bhowmik	CPI	23315	40.99%	Won	Pranab Bahubalindra	Cong. (R)	16706	29.37%	2nd	Gour Chandra Adhyakary	Cong. (O)	3286	5.78%	4th
191	Tamluk		Deva Prasad Bhowmik	CPI(M)	12425	24.41%	2nd											Ajoy Mukherjee	BC	32498	63.85%	Won
192	Mahishadal		Dipak Kumar Mitra	CPI(M)	7357	12.77%	3rd	Jagadindra Maiti	CPI	13945	24.21%	2nd	Prafulla Kumar Chakravarty	Cong. (R)	5479	9.51%	4th	Sushil Kumar Dhara	BC	27186	47.19%	Won
193	Sutahata	SC	Subal Chandra Das	CPI(M)	8254	14.50%	3rd	Rabindra Nath Karan	CPI	14133	24.84%	2nd	Niranjan Gayen	Cong. (R)	6934	12.19%	5th	Baneswar Patra	BC	19986	35.12%	Won
194	Nandigram							Bhupal Chandra Panda	CPI	26586	42.47%	Won	Syed Osman Ali	Cong. (R)	1462	2.34%	6th	Prabir Chandra Jana	Cong. (O)	15041	24.03%	2nd
195	Narghat		Aditi Dhana	BBC	3453	6.26%	5th	Swades Kumar Manna	CPI	14246	25.85%	2nd	Saradindu Samanta	Cong. (R)	10964	19.89%	4th	Bankim Behari Maity	BC	14337	26.01%	Won
196	Bhagabanpur		Pradhan Prasanta Kumar	CPI(M)	12713	25.27%	Won						Jagadish Chandra Pal	Cong. (R)	7712	15.33%	4th	Haripada Jana	Cong. (O)	12006	23.86%	2nd
197	Khajuri	SC	Jagadish Chandra Das	CPI(M)	13909	31.61%	Won	Sunirmal Paik	SSP	4048	9.20%	5th						Badal Das	Cong. (O)	11955	27.17%	2nd
198	Contai North		Anurup Panda	CPI(M)	10918	21.82%	3rd						Sailaja Das	Cong. (R)	13162	26.31%	2nd	Anil Kumar Mamma	PSP	15289	30.56%	Won
199	Contai South		Kar Ramsankar	CPI(M)	4940	10.51%	3rd						Adhikary Sisir Kumar	Cong. (R)	4806	10.23%	4th	Sudhir Chandra Das	PSP	18165	38.66%	Won
200	Ramnagar		Rohini Karan	Ind.	7174	16.49%	4th	Balailal Dasmahapatra	Ind.	5749	13.21%	5th	Hemanta Dutta	Cong. (R)	10111	23.24%	2nd	Bishal Radhagobinda	Cong. (O)	11297	25.96%	Won
201	Egra		Pal Nani Gopal	CPI(M)	7335	14.24%	2nd	Bibhuti Pahari	Ind.	6255	12.15%	3rd	Khan Samsul Alam	Cong. (R)	6113	11.87%	4th	Probodh Chandra Sinha	PSP	21549	41.84%	Won
202	Mugberia		Amarendra Krishna Goswami	CPI(M)	14199	30.02%	Won	Kiranmoy Nanda	SSP	4756	10.06%	4th						Janmenjay Ojha	PSP	13149	27.80%	2nd
203	Pataspur							Anil Mahapatra	CPI	19918	38.47%	2nd	Prafulla Maity	Cong. (R)	22954	44.34%	Won	Renuka Samanta	Ind.	4982	9.62%	3rd
204	Pingla							Kamakhyanandan Das Mahapatr	CPI	13254	24.45%	2nd	Bijoy Das	Cong. (R)	24892	45.93%	Won	Gouranga Samanta	Ind.	11804	21.78%	3rd
205	Debra		Sibaram Basu	CPI(M)	15682	33.37%	2nd	Chapal Bhattacharyya	CPI	5474	11.65%	3rd	Rabindra Nath Bera	Cong. (R)	17219	36.64%	Won	Hazra Bechuram	BC	2957	6.29%	4th
206	Keshpur	SC	Himangsu Kunar	CPI(M)	16907	31.61%	2nd	Sankar Prasad Doloy	CPI	10061	18.81%	3rd	Rajani Kanta Doldi	Cong. (R)	22939	42.89%	Won	Gangapada Kuar	BC	2850	5.33%	4th
207	Garhbeta East	SC	Bisui Angsumali	CPI(M)	13452	26.56%	3rd	Krishna Prasad Duley	CPI	16949	33.46%	Won	Madan Mohan Guria	Cong. (R)	15205	30.02%	2nd	Kali Kinkar Chalak	Cong. (O)	3481	6.87%	4th
208	Garhbeta West		Manohar Mahata	CPI(M)	12701	24.78%	2nd	Saroj Roy	CPI	13971	27.26%	Won	Ram Manohar Singha	Cong. (R)	11332	22.11%	3rd	Panchanan Sinha Roy	Cong. (O)	6528	12.74%	4th
209	Salbani		Sundaar Hazra	CPI(M)	12697	26.45%	Won	Thakur Das Mahata	CPI	9628	20.06%	2nd	Niranjan Khamray	Cong. (R)	6252	13.03%	5th	Birendra Nathhembram	JKP	7100	14.79%	3rd
210	Midnapur							Biswnath Mukherjee	CPI	23529	46.41%	Won	Sudhir Das Sarma	Cong. (R)	21453	42.32%	2nd	Binoy Jiban Ghosh	Ind.	3380	6.67%	3rd
211	Kharagpur		Jatindra Nath Misra	CPI(M)	5885	14.24%	3rd	Karunamay Bhattacharya	CPI	9557	23.13%	2nd	Gyan Singh Sohanpal	Cong. (R)	24869	60.19%	Won	Singh Ujagur	Cong. (O)	570	1.38%	4th
212	Kharagpur Local		Sheikh Siraj Ali	CPI(M)	8121	17.05%	3rd	Deben Das	CPI	18515	38.87%	2nd	Ajit Kumar Basu	Cong. (R)	18547	38.93%	Won	Bijoy Kumar Mandal	Cong. (O)	1046	2.20%	4th
213	Narayangarh							Bibhuti Bhusan Maity	CPI	10675	20.91%	2nd	Braja Kishore Maity	Cong. (R)	24498	47.98%	Won	Mihir Kumar Laha	BC	7858	15.39%	3rd
214	Dantan							Pulin Behari Tripathy	CPI	15772	31.94%	Won	Das Nirmalendu	Cong. (R)	8419	17.05%	3rd	Pradyot Kumar Mahanti	Cong. (O)	15495	31.38%	2nd
215	Keshiari	ST	Maheswar Sing	CPI(M)	13543	30.05%	2nd	Suren Singha	CPI	7171	15.91%	3rd	Budhan Chnadra Tudu	Cong. (R)	18780	41.66%	Won	Chittaranjan Mandi	JKP	3089	6.85%	4th
216	Nayagram	ST	Buddhadev Singh	CPI(M)	9871	23.46%	2nd	Birendra Nath Murmu	SSP	5044	11.99%	4th	Dasarathi Saren	Cong. (R)	16164	38.41%	Won	Deb Nath Hansda	JKP	8270	19.65%	3rd
217	Gopiballavpur		Monoranjan Mahapatra	CPI(M)	14885	28.53%	2nd	Rajaram Singha	SSP	7024	13.46%	4th	Harish Chandra Mahapatra	Cong. (R)	16617	31.85%	Won	Surendra Nath Mahata	Cong. (O)	7197	13.79%	3rd
218	Jhargram		Danareswar Sen	CPI(M)	16795	31.65%	2nd	Sukumar Ghosh	CPI	4104	7.73%	4th	Birendra Rejoymalladev	Cong. (R)	20615	38.85%	Won	Monoranjan Mahata	JKP	6525	12.30%	3rd
219	Binpur	ST	Bharat Hembram	CPI(M)	4976	11.08%	4th	Joyram Saren	CPI	9020	20.08%	3rd	Fakir Hansda	Cong. (R)	13684	30.46%	2nd	Shyam Charan Murmu	JKP	14450	32.16%	Won
220	Banduan	ST	Matilal Munda	CPI(M)	2937	8.19%	5th						Sital Chandra Hembram	Cong. (R)	11954	33.33%	Won	Kandru Majhi	LSS	11383	31.74%	2nd
221	Manbazar												Sitaram Mahato	Cong. (R)	19269	47.19%	Won	Girish Mahato	LSS	13090	32.06%	2nd
222	Balarampur	ST	Bikram Tudu	CPI(M)	12328	39.29%	Won	Sardar Sufal	SSP	825	2.63%	5th	Gita Hembran	Cong. (R)	10982	35.00%	2nd	Gobardhan Majhi	LSS	4985	15.89%	3rd
223	Arsa		Durga Majhi	CPI(M)	4078	12.22%	4th	Daman Chandra Kuiry	FB	8850	26.53%	2nd	Nitai Chandra Deshmukh	Cong. (R)	12099	36.26%	Won	Moti Lal Majhi	Cong. (O)	4391	13.16%	3rd
224	Jhalda		Janardan Kumar	CPI(M)	6704	16.83%	3rd	Chitta Ranjan Mahato	FB	12350	31.01%	2nd	Kinkar Mahato	Cong. (R)	18568	46.63%	Won	Gorachand Mahato	Cong. (O)	1735	4.36%	4th
225	Jaipur												Ramkrishna Mahato	Cong. (R)	15300	50.03%	Won	Bharat Chandra Bhandari	BC	4462	14.59%	2nd
226	Purulia							Prabir Kumar Malick	CPI	4395	12.00%	3rd	Saat Kumar Mukherjee	Cong. (R)	17050	46.55%	Won	Bibhuti Bhusan Das Gupta	LSS	11230	30.66%	2nd
227	Para	SC	Prahlad Bouri	CPI(M)	5198	18.77%	3rd	Sailen Bouri	SUC	6987	25.23%	2nd	Sarat Das	Cong. (R)	10689	38.60%	Won	Tinkori Bouri	BC	2912	10.52%	4th
228	Raghunathpur	SC	Madan Bouri	CPI(M)	7162	24.53%	3rd	Hari Pada Bouri	SUC	9577	32.80%	Won	Durga Das Bouri	Cong. (R)	8282	28.36%	2nd	Nepal Bouri	Cong. (O)	1932	6.62%	4th
229	Kashipur		Basudeb Acharia	CPI(M)	6492	21.65%	3rd	Pramatha Mandal	CPI	6623	22.08%	2nd	Madan Mohan Mahato	Cong. (R)	11552	38.52%	Won	Sisir Kumar Bandopadhyay	BC	2242	7.48%	4th
230	Hura		Ambarish Mukhopadhaya	CPI(M)	6145	17.20%	2nd	Sadhu Banerjee	SUC	2849	7.97%	5th	Satdal Mahato	Cong. (R)	16446	46.02%	Won	Krishna Prasad Choudhury	LSS	4748	13.29%	3rd
231	Taldangra		Panda Mohini Mohan	CPI(M)	23856	45.72%	Won	Ajit Singha	CPI	2269	4.35%	4th	S. Choudhury Prayot Kumar	Cong. (R)	21389	41.00%	2nd	Mahata Mritunjoy	JKP	2886	5.53%	3rd
232	Raipur	ST	Syam Charan Mandy	BBC	5945	13.60%	5th	Maniklal Resra	CPI	7462	17.07%	4th	Babulal Hemram	Cong. (R)	9292	21.26%	2nd	Saren Babulal	JKP	9362	21.42%	Won
233	Ranibandh	ST	Suchabo Saren	CPI(M)	20797	50.36%	Won	Nandini Murmu	CPI	1656	4.01%	6th	Hembram Nabin Chandra	Cong. (R)	5171	12.52%	3rd	Baidya Nath Hansda	BC	8951	21.67%	2nd
234	Indpur	SC	Prayag Mandal	BBC	9786	29.44%	Won	Ajit Sahana	CPI	4491	13.51%	4th	Ramsaran Sahana	Cong. (R)	5694	17.13%	3rd	Gour Lohar	BC	9374	28.20%	2nd
235	Chhatna		Datta Rabi	BBC	5465	18.36%	2nd	Sunil Acharya	SSP	1094	3.68%	5th	Kamalakanta Hemram	Cong. (R)	13399	45.02%	Won	Dey Nirmalendu	Cong. (O)	5244	17.62%	3rd
236	Gangajalghati	SC	Kalipada Bauri	CPI(M)	17360	48.53%	Won						Saktipada Maji	Cong. (R)	10719	29.96%	2nd	Nabadurga Mandal	BC	5964	16.67%	3rd
237	Barjora		Aswini Kumar Rai	CPI(M)	24374	46.41%	Won	Sakti Prasad Sam	SUC	4415	8.41%	4th	Subal Bandopadhyay	Cong. (R)	6827	13.00%	3rd	Sudhangshu Sakhar Tewari	BC	13399	25.51%	2nd
238	Bankura		Sumitra Chatterjee	CPI(M)	11927	25.18%	2nd	Debabrata Chatterjee	CPI	11116	23.47%	3rd	Kashi Nath Misra	Cong. (R)	17423	36.79%	Won	Girija Prasanna Dubey	BC	3129	6.61%	4th
239	Onda		Manik Datta	CPI(M)	16151	38.77%	Won	Anil Kumar Mukherjee	FB	2897	6.95%	5th	Arun Chandra Patra	Cong. (R)	11070	26.57%	2nd	Guiram Patra	HMS	4298	10.32%	3rd
240	Vishnupur		Karunamoy Goswami	CPI(M)	10891	28.28%	2nd	Bimal Kumar Sapkar	CPI	8374	21.74%	3rd	Phabataran Chakraboraty	Cong. (R)	12206	31.69%	Won	Narayan Mukhopadayay	Cong. (O)	3455	8.97%	4th
241	Kotulpur		Jatadhari Mukhopadhyay	CPI(M)	16135	38.43%	Won	Chandidas Mukhopadhyay	CPI	5102	12.15%	3rd	Sasanka Sekhar Mitra	Cong. (R)	15231	36.27%	2nd	Gobinda Bandopadhyay	BC	4027	9.59%	4th
242	Indas	SC	Badan Bora	CPI(M)	17759	42.46%	Won	Biswanath Dom	CPI	4687	11.21%	3rd	Santan Santra	Cong. (R)	15514	37.09%	2nd	Nanda Dulal Bayen	BC	3867	9.25%	4th
243	Sonamukhi	SC	Sukhendu Khan	CPI(M)	15091	38.83%	Won	Kirity Bagdi	CPI	6616	17.02%	3rd	Kanai Saha	Cong. (R)	13979	35.97%	2nd	Chand Roy Majhi	BC	3182	8.19%	4th
244	Hirapur		Bamapada Mukherjee	CPI(M)	18603	45.16%	Won	Nitish Sett	CPI	11143	27.05%	2nd	Upashaya Mihir	Cong. (R)	9945	24.14%	3rd	Ganguli Ranjit	Cong. (O)	1144	2.78%	4th
245	Kulti		Chandra Sekhar Mukhopadhya	CPI(M)	10509	31.83%	2nd	Chakravarty Taaraknath	SSP	3678	11.14%	4th	Ramdas Banerjee	Cong. (R)	12828	38.86%	Won	Sohan Prasad Verma	BC	4272	12.94%	3rd
246	Barabani		Basuroy Sunil	CPI(M)	20211	48.65%	Won	Haridas Chakravarty	CPI	5608	13.50%	3rd	Sukumar Bandopadhaya	Cong. (R)	13877	33.40%	2nd	Krishna Prasad Trivedi	Cong. (O)	818	1.97%	4th
247	Asansol		Lokesh Ghose	CPI(M)	19063	44.72%	Won	Niranjan Dihidar	CPI	18305	42.94%	2nd						G. R. Mitra	Cong. (O)	5263	12.35%	3rd
248	Raniganj		Haradhan Roy	CPI(M)	32161	68.89%	Won	Sunil Sen	CPI	6773	14.51%	3rd	Rabindra Mukherjee	Cong. (R)	7753	16.61%	2nd					
249	Jamuria	SC	Durgadas Mandal	CPI(M)	15398	55.79%	Won	Dibakar Bouri	SSP	1262	4.57%	3rd	Amaarendra Nath Mandal	Cong. (R)	10458	37.89%	2nd	Bouri Chandranath	Cong. (O)	480	1.74%	4th
250	Ukhra	SC	Lakhan Bagdi	CPI(M)	18950	54.19%	Won						Mondal Haradhan	Cong. (R)	16020	45.81%	2nd					
251	Durgapur		Dilip Kumar Majumdar	CPI(M)	40999	49.14%	Won	Nimat Routh	CPI	6210	7.44%	3rd						Ananda Gopal Mukhopadhyay	Cong. (O)	36223	43.42%	2nd
252	Faridpur		Sanat Kumar Banerjee	CPI(M)	17356	41.21%	Won	Dina Nath Roy	CPI	7036	16.71%	3rd	Sri Dasghatak	Cong. (R)	9160	21.75%	2nd	Labanya Gopal Chatak	Cong. (O)	5501	13.06%	4th
253	Ausgram	SC	Sridhar Malik	CPI(M)	28445	56.13%	Won	Roidas Bamapada	CPI	3704	7.31%	3rd						Bansidhar Saha	BC	17849	35.22%	2nd
254	Bhatar		Anath Bandhu Ghose	CPI(M)	18516	46.84%	Won	Aswini Roy	CPI	5391	13.64%	3rd						Sushil Kumar Ghosh	BC	12477	31.56%	2nd
255	Galsi		Anil Roy	CPI(M)	21299	56.57%	Won	Deb Ranjan Sen	FB	2598	6.90%	3rd						Manoranjan Bakshi	BC	12314	32.70%	2nd
256	Burdwan North		Debabrata Datta	CPI(M)	33954	62.68%	Won	Mahammad Idrish Mondal	FB	1359	2.51%	3rd	Jiban Krishna Biswas	Cong. (R)	18430	34.02%	2nd	Ajit Kumar Majumdar	Cong. (O)	428	0.79%	4th
257	Burdwan South		Benoy Krishna Chodhury	CPI(M)	28257	50.09%	Won						Pradip Kumar Bhattacherjee	Cong. (R)	26985	47.84%	2nd	Dasarathi Tah	Cong. (O)	818	1.45%	3rd
258	Khandaghosh	SC	Purna Chandra Malick	CPI(M)	22871	51.25%	Won	Gobardhan Pakray	SSP	319	0.71%	6th	Manoranjan Pramanik	Cong. (R)	17588	39.42%	2nd	Mallick Prabir Kumar	RSP	2403	5.39%	3rd
259	Raina		Gokulananda Roy	CPI(M)	31549	60.27%	Won						Sukumar Chattopadhyay	Cong. (R)	19142	36.57%	2nd	Rana Rani Tan	Cong. (O)	1656	3.16%	3rd
260	Jamalpur	SC	Kalipada Das	MFB	22396	50.40%	Won						Puranjoy Pramanik	Cong. (R)	18713	42.11%	2nd	Basudev Malik	BC	2521	5.67%	3rd
261	Memari		Benoy Krishna Konar	CPI(M)	39366	62.41%	Won						Tuhin Kumar Samanta	Cong. (R)	21166	33.56%	2nd	Jitu Murmo	JKP	2069	3.28%	3rd
262	Kalna		Hare Krishna Konar	CPI(M)	31896	54.45%	Won						Nurul Islam Molla	Cong. (R)	24930	42.56%	2nd	Kanka Murmu	JKP	1754	2.99%	3rd
263	Nadanghat		Syed Abul Mansur Habibullah	CPI(M)	34288	59.58%	Won											Paresh Chandra Goswami	Cong. (O)	22315	38.78%	2nd
264	Manteswar		Kashi Nath Hazba Chowdhury	CPI(M)	29750	57.12%	Won	Monobendra Bramachari	FB	1853	3.56%	4th	Saitendra Nath Hati	Cong. (R)	17672	33.93%	2nd	Chandra Sekhar Samanta	BC	1960	3.76%	3rd
265	Purbasthali		Mollah Humayun Kabir	CPI(M)	30617	63.78%	Won						Radha Gobinda Prasad Mallick	Cong. (R)	15542	32.38%	2nd	Roy Manabendra Kumar	Cong. (O)	1292	2.69%	3rd
266	Katwa		Haramohan Sinha	CPI(M)	27656	54.70%	Won						Subrata Mukherjee	Cong. (R)	20990	41.51%	2nd	Tarapada Bandyopadhyay	Cong. (O)	1916	3.79%	3rd
267	Mangalkot		Nikhilananda Sar	CPI(M)	28814	62.04%	Won											Kenaram Panja	BC	16814	36.20%	2nd
268	Ketugram	SC	Nimal Chandra Mandal	CPI(M)	18408	43.42%	Won	Sakti Pada Haldar	CPI	5797	13.67%	3rd	Prabhakar Mandal	Cong. (R)	17482	41.24%	2nd	Sahadev Majhi	Cong. (O)	705	1.66%	4th
269	Nanur	SC	Banamali Das	CPI(M)	18486	50.16%	Won	Sakti Pada Bagdi	CPI	5150	13.97%	3rd						Ila Das	BC	12420	33.70%	2nd
270	Bolpur		Prasanta Mukherjee	CPI(M)	13088	39.84%	Won	Chitta Roy	CPI	7010	21.34%	3rd						Ranjit Kumar Choudhury	BC	10970	33.40%	2nd
271	Labhpur		Sunil Mazumdar	CPI(M)	15536	50.32%	Won	Anita Mukherjee	SUC	2023	6.55%	4th	Sisir Kumar Dutta	Cong. (R)	5271	17.07%	3rd	Sasanka Sekhar Buj	BC	6996	22.66%	2nd
272	Dubrajpur		Sheikh Manjurul Islam	CPI(M)	12539	40.68%	Won	Bhakti Bhushan Mandal	FB	5501	17.85%	3rd	Mohammad Idris	Cong. (R)	6406	20.78%	2nd	Molla Golam Mortuza	RSP	4621	14.99%	4th
273	Rajnagar	SC	Nanda Bauri	CPI(M)	10443	38.92%	Won	Bauri Gopal	FB	5227	19.48%	3rd	Nabani Dhar Mandal	Cong. (R)	9996	37.25%	2nd	Gandhi Bauri	Cong. (O)	1167	4.35%	4th
274	Suri		Arun Choudhury	CPI(M)	8090	23.17%	2nd	Protiva Mukherjee	SUC	12060	34.54%	Won	Suniti Chattaraj	Cong. (R)	6330	18.13%	4th	Shomal Chatterjee	BC	7103	20.34%	3rd
275	Mahammad Bazar		Dhiren Sen	CPI(M)	13457	45.60%	Won						Nilratan Ghose	Cong. (R)	8370	28.37%	2nd	Bejoy Krishna Ghose	BC	4399	14.91%	3rd
276	Mayureshwar	SC	Panchanan Let	CPI(M)	8723	28.05%	3rd	Lalchand Fulamali	CPI	10925	35.13%	Won	Adharsaha	Cong. (R)	10774	34.64%	2nd	Let Dhwahadhari	Cong. (O)	681	2.19%	4th
277	Rampurhat		Braja Mohan Mukherjee	CPI(M)	15546	50.37%	Won	Kumarish Chandra Guin	FB	3012	9.76%	3rd	Anada Gopal Roy	Cong. (R)	11103	35.97%	2nd	Durgapada Das	Cong. (O)	1205	3.90%	4th
278	Hansan	SC	Trilochan Mal	RCPI	9181	44.20%	Won	Bibhuti Bhusan Mandal	FB	1725	8.31%	4th	Satyaban Mandal	Cong. (R)	4894	23.56%	2nd	Mandal Bijoy Krishna	Ind.	4425	21.30%	3rd
279	Nalhati		Golam Mohiuddin	Ind.	10184	39.66%	Won	Ziad Buxi	SUC	4603	17.93%	3rd	Abdul Aziz	Cong. (R)	3724	14.50%	4th	Mohiazahuralisiam	Ind.	5859	22.82%	2nd
280	Murarai		Durgadas Ghosh	Ind.	4302	14.17%	4th	Bazle Ahmad	SUC	16310	53.73%	Won	Md. Mansural Hague	Cong. (R)	4759	15.68%	2nd	Alamnurul Hoda Akhtar	BC	4560	15.02%	3rd

== Government formation ==
Following the election, the Congress(R), the Bangla Congress and the ULDF came to an agreement (albeit without the approval of SUCI), that Congress(R) and Bangla Congress would form a government and ULDF would support it from outside. Two ULDF affiliates, SSP and Gorkha League, joined the government.
