= Bhabatosh Soren =

Indian politician

Bhabatosh Soren (1 February 1934 – 2012) was an Indian politician. He hailed from Jalguria village, Bankura District, and was a leader of the Santhal people. A lawyer by profession, Soren was a member of the West Bengal Legislative Assembly 1967–1971 and served as Minister for Forests in the state government 1969–1970.

== Youth ==
Soren was born on 1 February 1934, in Jalguria, Bankura District. He was the son of Baidyanath Soren. He obtained M.A. and LLB degrees and joined the Bankura District Bar in 1958. In 1959 he got a government job in Calcutta, working as Preventive Officer at Sea Customs. In 1960 he got a job as District Information Officer under the state government. Soren resigned from government service in 1965 and began practicing law in Bankura again. Soren published the Santali language monthly Kherwal Aram (in Bengali script) from Bankura.

== Legislator ==
Joining politics, Soren won the Raipur (ST) seat in the 1967 West Bengal Legislative Assembly election. Standing as a Bangla Congress candidate, he obtained 22,840 votes (51.48%) and defeated the Indian National Congress candidate J.N. Murmu.

== Forest Minister ==
Soren retained the Raipur (ST) seat in the 1969 West Bengal Legislative Assembly election. Standing as a Bangla Congress candidate, he obtained 23,680 votes (45.97%), again defeating INC candidate J.N. Murmu.

Soren was named Minister for Forests in the second United Front government formed in 1969. Soren, along with two other Bangla Congress ministers Charu Mihir Sarkar and Sushil Kumar Dhara, resigned from his post as Minister on 19 February 1970. On 16 March 1970 Ajoy Mukherjee, the chief minister, presented his resignation, and the government was dismissed on 19 March 1970.

He contested the Raipur (ST) seat again in the 1971 West Bengal Legislative Assembly election, both this time he didn't just face the INC, but also the Jharkhand Party, former UF coalition partner CPI, a candidate from the break-away Biplobi Bangla Congress as well as J.N. Murmu (now in Congress (O)). Bhabatosh Soren finished in third place, with 8,005 votes (18.31%).

He did not contest the 1972 West Bengal Legislative Assembly election. In the 1977 West Bengal Legislative Assembly election he stood as a Janata Party candidate in Raipur (ST), finishing in third place with 9,138 votes (19.06%)

He contested the Raipur (ST) seat in the 1982 West Bengal Legislative Assembly election as the INC candidate, but was defeated by Upen Kisku of CPI(M). Soren finished in second place with 28,894 votes (34.72%). He again sought to challenge Kisku in the 1987 West Bengal Legislative Assembly election, finishing in second place with 33,053 votes (35.37%).

== Later years ==
After leaving politics, Soren resumed legal practice in Bankura. Soren died in 2012.
