= Nandalal Gurung =

Indian politician (born 1921)

Nandalal Gurung (born 15 December 1921) was an Indian politician from Darjeeling. He belonged to the All India Gorkha League, and represented the Jore Bungalow constituency from 1967 to 1971 and 1972 to 1977.

== Life and career ==
Gurung was born in Darjeeling on 15 December 1921. He was the son of Padam Bahadur Gurung. He married Dhankeshari. He was a commissioner of Darjeeling Municipality and a member of the Darjeeling District Committee of the All India Gorkha League.

He was fielded by the All India Gorkha League in the Jore Bungalow seat in the 1962 West Bengal Legislative Assembly election, contesting against the incumbent CPI legislator Bhadra Bahadur Hamal. Gurung finished in second place with 8,832 votes (41.11%), just 129 votes less than Hamal.

Gurung won the Jore Bungalow seat in the 1967 West Bengal Legislative Assembly election, obtaining 12,428 votes (42.96%). He also became the president of the Darjeeling District Kulain Bagan Mazdur Sangh, a trade union of tea plantation workers, in 1967. Gurung was the local Member of Legislative Assembly during the 1967 Naxalbari uprising. Whilst Gurung opposed the agitation, and in response he took part in forming the North Bengal Welfare Committee together with Kamal Guha and representatives of the Bangla Congress and Samyukta Socialist Party - seeking to promote land reform issues and address some issues linked to the conflict.

He retained the Jore Bungalow seat in the 1969 West Bengal Legislative Assembly election, obtaining 15,693 votes (58.60%). He lost the Jore Bungalow seat to CPI(M) candidate Ananda Pathak in the 1971 West Bengal Legislative Assembly election, finishing in second place with 12,572 votes (37.72%)

Gurung returned to the West Bengal Legislative Assembly in the 1972 election, winning the Jore Bungalow seat with 12,063 votes (34.12%) and defeating the Congress(R) and CPI(M) candidates (whom both had over 11,000 votes). When the All India Gorkha League underwent a split, Gurung sided with the L.S. Pradhan-led faction. The Pradhan faction fielded Gurung as its candidate in the 1977 West Bengal Legislative Assembly election in the Darjeeling constituency taking on All India Gorkha League leader Deo Prakash Rai. Gurung finished in sixth place, with 1,952 votes (4.92%).
