= Sudhir Chandra Das =

Indian politician

Sudhir Chandra Das (born 15 November 1907, date of death unknown) was an Indian politician. During the struggle for Indian independence, he took part in the Salt, No-Tax and Quit India Movements. He represented Contai North and later Contai South in the West Bengal Legislative Assembly, becoming Minister for Animal Husbandry and Veterinary Services in 1969.

== 1952 election ==
Das left the Indian National Congress in 1950 and joined the Kisan Mazdoor Praja Party. Das contested the first West Bengal Legislative Assembly election in independent India, held in 1952, as a KMPP candidate, winning the Contai North seat. He obtained 11,830 votes (35.32%), defeating the candidates of the Indian National Congress, the Communist Party of India, the Bharatiya Jan Sangh and the Socialist Party.

== PSP leader ==
He later became a key leader of the Praja Socialist Party. Das contested the Contai South seat in the 1957 West Bengal Legislative Assembly election, finishing in second place with 18,145 votes (45.39%).

Das won the Contai South seat in the 1962 West Bengal Legislative Assembly election, obtaining 22,565 votes (51.06%). He retained the seat in the 1967 West Bengal Legislative Assembly election, obtaining 26,089 votes (51.04%). He again won the Contai South seat in the 1969 West Bengal Legislative Assembly election, obtaining 29,776 votes (57.07%). In all of the elections 1957–1969, the contests in Contai South were essentially straight contests between PSP and the Indian National Congress (in the sense that no other candidate obtained more than 5% of the vote).

== Minister ==
On 9 May 1969 Das, leading a dissident faction of the Praja Socialist Party, was sworn in as Animal Husbandry & Veterinary Minister in the second United Front government of West Bengal.

Das retained the Contai South seat in the 1971 West Bengal Legislative Assembly election, again standing on a PSP ticket but now facing opposition not just from the Indian National Congress but also the CPI(M) (former United Front partner) and the Congress(O). He obtained 18,165 (38.66%). Das was named Minister for Animal Husbandry and Veterinary Services (including Zoological Gardens) in the cabinet formed by Ajoy Mukherjee (a coalition of Bangla Congress-INC-Indian Union Muslim League-Rebel Samyukta Socialist Party and Das' rebel PSP – Democratic Socialist Consolidation).

== Later years ==
Das retained the Contai South seat in the 1972 West Bengal Legislative Assembly election, contesting on an independent ticket. He obtained 20,001 votes (43.90%), defeating the candidates of Congress(O) and CPI(M). On 11 June 1972 the rebel PSP led by Das and Arun Mitra merged into the Indian National Congress to "pursue the socialist path shown by Indira Gandhi". Das became a prominent member of the Indian National Congress.

Das lost the Contai South seat in the 1977 West Bengal Legislative Assembly election, defeated by Satya Brata Maiti of the Janata Party. He ran on an independent ticket, finishing in second place with 4,556 votes (10.26%).
