= Hanskhali Assembly constituency =

Coordinates: 23.36°N 88.60°E

Hanskhali
- Former constituency No. 79 for the West Bengal Legislative Assembly

Constituency details
- Country: India
- Region: East India
- State: West Bengal
- District: Nadia
- Lok Sabha constituency: Nabadwip
- Established: 1962
- Abolished: 2011
- Reservation: SC

Hanskhali was an assembly constituency in Nadia district in the Indian state of West Bengal. It was reserved for scheduled castes.

== Overview ==
As a consequence of the order of the Delimitation Commission Hanskhali Assembly constituency ceases to exist from 2011. Ranaghat Uttar Purba Assembly constituency is a new constituency in the area.

Hanskhali assembly constituency was part of the Nabadwip (Lok Sabha constituency).

== Members of the Legislative Assembly ==
Election Year	Constituency	Name of M.L.A.	Party affiliation
1962	Hanskhali	Pramatha Ranjan Thakur	Indian National Congress
1967		Charu Mihir Sarkar	Bangla Congress
1969		Charu Mihir Sarkar	Bangla Congress
1971		Ananda Mohan Biswas	Indian National Congress
1972		Ananda Mohan Biswas	Indian National Congress
1977		Sukumar Mandal	Communist Party of India (Marxist)
1982		Sukumar Mandal	Communist Party of India (Marxist)
1987		Sukumar Mandal	Communist Party of India (Marxist)
1991		Nayan Sarkar	Communist Party of India (Marxist)
1996		Sasanka Sekhar Biswas	Indian National Congress
2001		Nayan Sarkar	Communist Party of India (Marxist)
2006		Nayan Sarkar	Communist Party of India (Marxist)

== Election results ==
=== 1977-2006 ===
Nayan Sarkar of CPI (M) won the 79 Hanskhali (SC) assembly seat in 2006 and 2001 defeating his nearest rivals Dr. Ramendra Nath Biswas and Abir Ranjan Biswas (both of Trinamool Congress) in the respective years. In 1996, Sasanka Sekhar Biswas of Congress defeated Nayan Sarkar of CPI (M). In 1991, Nayan Sarkar of CPI(M) defeated Sasanka Sekhar Biswas of Congress. In 1987, 1982 and 1977, Sukumar Mandal of CPI (M) defeated Sasanka Sekhar Biswas, Kshownish Biswas and Ananda Mohan Biswas (all of Congress) in respective years.

=== 1962-1972 ===
Ananda Mohan Biswas of Congress won in 1972 and 1971. Charu Mihir Sarkar of Bangla Congress won in 1969 and 1967. Pramatha Ranjan Thakur of Congress won in 1962. Prior to that the Hanskhali seat was not there.
