= Charu Mihir Sarkar =

Indian politician

Charu Mihir Sarkar (born 31 August 1924) was an Indian politician who was a member of the West Bengal Legislative Assembly from 1967 to 1971 and served as Minister in the 1967 and 1969 United Front state cabinets.

== Youth ==
Sarkar was born on 31 August 1924. He went to school at Malikandah in Dacca District, later receiving education at Surendranath College in Calcutta. He received Master of Arts degree from Calcutta University.

Sarkar as contested the Scheduled Castes seat in the Bongaon constituency in the 1957 West Bengal Legislative Assembly election, standing as a Praja Socialist Party candidate. He finished in second place with 20,959 votes (29.54%), finishing ahead of former Minister of Pakistan Jogendra Nath Mandal.

== Social work ==
Sarkar was involved in various social welfare activities in his home district. He founded the Ramchandrapur Palli Mongal Vidhyapith, and became its headmaster.

== Minister ==
Sarkar won the Hanskhali (SC) seat in the 1967 West Bengal Legislative Assembly election, standing as a Bangla Congress candidate. He obtained 33,298 votes (67.12%), defeating R.K. Mallick of the Indian National Congress in a straight contest. On 5 July 1967 he was sworn in as a Minister without Portfolio in the United Front state government, after prolonged negotiations on including a minister from Scheduled Castes in the cabinet.

Sarkar retained the Hanskhali (SC) seat in the 1969 West Bengal Legislative Assembly election, obtaining 25,957 votes (51.75%). Sarkar was named Minister for Community Development in the second United Front government formed in 1969. Sarkar, along with two other Bangla Congress ministers, resigned from his post as Minister on 19 February 1970. On 16 March 1970 Ajoy Mukherjee, the chief minister, presented his resignation, and the government was dismissed on 19 March 1970.

== 1971 election ==
Sarkar lost the Hanskhali (SC) seat in the 1971 West Bengal Legislative Assembly election. He obtained 4,574 votes (8.79%), finishing in third place behind the INC and CPI(M) candidates.
