= Progressive Muslim League =

Political party in India

The Progressive Muslim League was a political party in West Bengal, India. The party emerged ahead of the 1969 West Bengal Legislative Assembly election. The party won three seats in the West Bengal Legislative Assembly; Nasiruddin Khan in Naoda, Ahammad Aktabuddin in Hariharpara and Harun-or-Rashid in Deganga. The party had contested 40 out of 280 seats in the election, obtaining 208,574 votes (1.56% of the state-wide vote). The party supported the United Front government in the state, without joining it.

In the 1971 West Bengal Legislative Assembly election, the PML fielded two candidates, none of whom was elected. The party obtained 13,821 votes (0.11%).
