= Kalipada Das =

Ustad Kalipada Das is a Bangladeshi singer and recipient of the Independence Day Award, the highest civilian award of Bangladesh.

== Career ==
Das was awarded the Independence Day Award in 2020 for his contribution to culture along with Ferdousi Mazumder.
