= Ajit Kumar Basu =

Indian cardiothoracic surgeon (1912–1986)

- Born: 1912; India
- Died: 3 December 1986 (aged 73–74)
- Occupation: Cardiac surgeon
- Known for: Open Heart surgery
- Awards: Padma Shri; Shanti Swarup Bhatnagar Prize

Ajit Kumar Basu (1912–1986) was an Indian cardiac surgeon. He was a recipient of Shanti Swarup Bhatnagar Prize, the highest Indian science award in 1967. He was honoured by the Government of India in 1970 with the Padma Shri, the fourth highest Indian civilian award. He qualified for his FRCS in 1946. He was the first Indian to be appointed examiner of the Royal College and served as its Hunterian Professor.
