= Badruddin Ahmad =

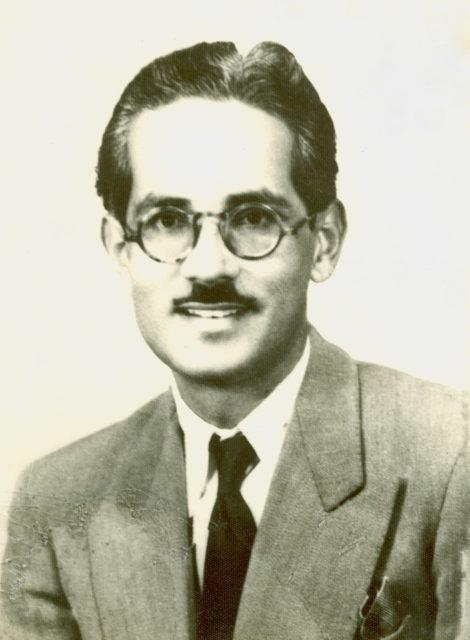
- Badruddin Ahmad circa 1935
- Born: August 17, 1912; Patiala, Patiala State, British India
- Died: March 19, 1981 (aged 68); Karachi, Pakistan
- Education: Allahabad University
- Occupation: Civil Aviator

Badruddin Ahmad (17 August 1912, Patiala, India - 19 March 1981, Karachi, Pakistan) was a pioneer in the field of Civil aviation. He was instrumental in the development of post-World War II aviation plans and supervised the construction of non-military runways and airports. The assets developed by Ahmad were transferred to the international civil authorities, leading to the advent of Civil Aviation as an industry.

Ahmad was perhaps best known for his association with the International Civil Aviation Organization (ICAO) and in his roles as the Director General of Civil Aviation for the Government of Pakistan and Chief of Administration at the Pakistan Meteorological Department.

== Education ==
Ahmad graduated with a Master of Arts in Mathematics degree, with specialization in Advanced Astronomy from Allahabad University (then called 'University of Allahbad' and referred to as 'the Oxford of the East') on 30 January 1935.

== Career ==
Badruddin Ahmed was instrumental in the events and planning that lead to the advent of the Civil Aviation industry.

He drafted government policy on the subsidization of flying clubs; licensed many non-military pilots, navigators and ground engineers; and progressed the selection and training of pilots and ground engineers for the Royal Indian Air Force.

After partition of Indian subcontinent, Ahmed drafted the plans for Civil Aviation in Pakistan and conducted pioneer work in establishing the Department of Civil Aviation in Pakistan and was responsible for the coordination of the department's activities and international relations.

He was responsible for much work in the establishment of Pakistan International Airlines and was director in charge of the construction of various civil aviation works such as jet runways and airports.

In 1955 he was elected member of the British Institute of Transport. He was elected Chairman in 1959 by unanimous vote of the Joint Middle East and South East Asia Air Navigation Conference to lay down the rules for Jet Aircraft operations.

In 1959, he was awarded the Tamgha-e-Quaid-e-Azam, a prestigious civil decoration of Pakistan, for his contribution to the Civil Aviation development in Pakistan.

In 1960 he was promoted to Director General of Civil Aviation Authority.

In 1962 he was given the additional appointment of Chief of Administration with the status of Additional Director in the Pakistan Meteorological Department.

During his career he represented Pakistan in four General Assemblies of the International Civil Aviation Organization and worked on defining international travel and carrier routes.

== Horticulture ==
In addition to his distinguished career in government policy and Civil Aviation, Ahmad made contributions to the field of horticulture.

He was a fellow of the Royal Horticultural Society and the Royal Rose Society (now the Royal National Rose Society). Many non-indigenous plants in the Indian Subcontinent are attributed to him.

He was co-founder of the Horticultural Society of Pakistan and served as its vice president from 1959 to 1961. During his tenure he introduced the rubber plant (Ficus elastica) to Pakistan and received awards and recognition for Crotons and Carnation cultivations.

After death, the British High Commission suggested that the Government of Pakistan dedicate a Horticultural Library to his name. A one million-pound memorial fund for books was offered. Alas, political turbulence in Pakistan at the time meant that the proposal never came to fruition.

== Personal life ==
Ahmad was born in Patiala, India to Khairuddin Ahmad and Fatima Begum Javed. His father was a Royal Veterinary Surgeon and his mother was a homemaker. He is the oldest of five siblings, three sisters and two younger brothers.

A polyglot, Ahmad was able to speak, read and write in English, Persian, Urdu and Punjabi; and had working knowledge of Italian, French, Arabic and other languages.

He participated in the popular Brain Trust programme on Radio Pakistan, was a member of the Royal Photographic Society from 1953 to 1964, and a lifetime member of the council of the Iqbal Academy.

He was married twice to Ms. Jeanne Ahmed and Ms. Maher UnNisah and had two sons, Saeed A Masood and Shafat A Mehmood.
