= Sambhu Ghosh =

Indian politician (1927–1986)

Sambhu Charan Ghosh (10 June 1927 – 15 June 1986) was an Indian politician and scholar, belonging to the All India Forward Bloc. He was a member of the Central Committee of the party.

== Biography ==
Ghosh was born on 10 June 1927. He was the son of Nityananda Ghosh. He was married to Chitra Ghosh and they had their only son namely Ritabrata Ghosh. Ghosh obtained B.Sc., B.A. and M.A. degrees from Calcutta University. As a student he became a follower of Netaji Subhas Chandra Bose. He took up a position as lecturer of philosophy at Uluberia College. He took part in the Indian struggle for independence and in 1944 he became a member of the All India Forward Bloc. Ghosh served as Commissioner of Hooghly-Chinsurah municipality for many years. He served as president of the West Bengal Municipal Primary Teachers' Association for a short period. He was a co-founder of Jatish Chandra Vidyapith.

Ghosh contested the Chinsurah constituency seat in the 1957 West Bengal Legislative Assembly election. He finished in second place with 16,582 votes (40.64%). Ghosh won the Chinsurah seat in the 1962, 1967, 1969, 1977 and 1982 assembly elections. Ghosh was named Minister for Cottage and Small Scale Industries in the second United Front cabinet formed in 1969. He was also Higher Education Minister in first Left Front Ministry in 1977 under Chief Minister Jyoti Basu and in the second term of left front government also he held the same portfolio in 1982 until his death in 1986.

Ghosh lost the Chinsurah seat in the 1971 West Bengal Legislative Assembly election. He finished in third place behind the Congress and CPI(M) candidates, obtaining 6,050 votes (11.34%).
