= Barada Mukutmoni =

Indian politician

Barada Mukutmoni was an Indian politician, belonging to the Bolshevik Party of India. He briefly served as Minister for Tourism in the state of West Bengal.

== BPI leader in Bengal ==
In early 1944 the BPI politburo dissolved the Bengal Committee of the party and formed a 4-member secretariat for the province with Mukutmoni as one of its members.

During the 1956 reorganisation of states in India, Mukutmoni took part in the protests against the proposed merger of Bihar and West Bengal into "Purba Pradesh". He was a member of a January 1956 committee of left parties in West Bengal that reviewed that reorganisation proposal (other members included Jyoti Basu and Nihar Mukherjee). As of 1959 he served as the President of the Radha Chemicals Workers Union.

== Electoral politics ==
Mukutmoni contested the Titagarh constituency in the 1957 West Bengal Legislative Assembly election. He finished in fourth place with 1,923 votes (6.72)%. In the 1962 West Bengal Legislative Assembly election he contested the Deganga seat and finished in second place with 11,449 votes (32.83%). In the 1967 West Bengal Legislative Assembly election he contested the Naihati seat and finished in third place with 7443 votes (13.10%).

== Tourism Minister and BPI split ==
Mukutmoni was named Minister of Tourism in the second United Front government of West Bengal in March 1969.

A split occurred in BPI in the wake of Mukutmoni joining the state government. To become a minister Mukutmoni had to resign from his post as secretary of the West Bengal State Committee of BPI, which he did. But when the State Committee met on 14 March 1969 Mukutmoni's candidate for new secretary was defeated in a vote. Mukutmoni refused to hand over the secretary post to the secretary-elect Sita Seth and in July 1969 the Central Committee of BPI declared expelled Mukutmoni and his followers from the party. In response Mukutmoni formed a Central Committee of his own, with three expelled West Bengal State Committee members. The two factions clashed over control of the party headquarters on Central Avenue.

A June 1969 edition of Himmat reported that Mukutmoni was about to lose his ministerial post. As the West Bengal Legislative Council was abolished in August 1969 (a body to which Mukutmoni, in theory, had been able to get elected to), Mukutmoni was forced to resign from his ministerial post six months after the formation of the second United Front government.

== 1971 elections ==
Ahead of the 1971 West Bengal Legislative Assembly election the BPI (Barada Mukutmoni group) joined the CPI-led United Left Democratic Front. Mukutmoni stood as a candidate on a CPI ticket in Chakdaha, finishing in fourth place with 4,479 votes (7.78%).
