= 1969 West Bengal Legislative Assembly election =

State assembly election in india

- 9 February 1969

All 280 seats in the West Bengal Legislative Assembly 141 seats needed for a majority
- Turnout: 66.51%
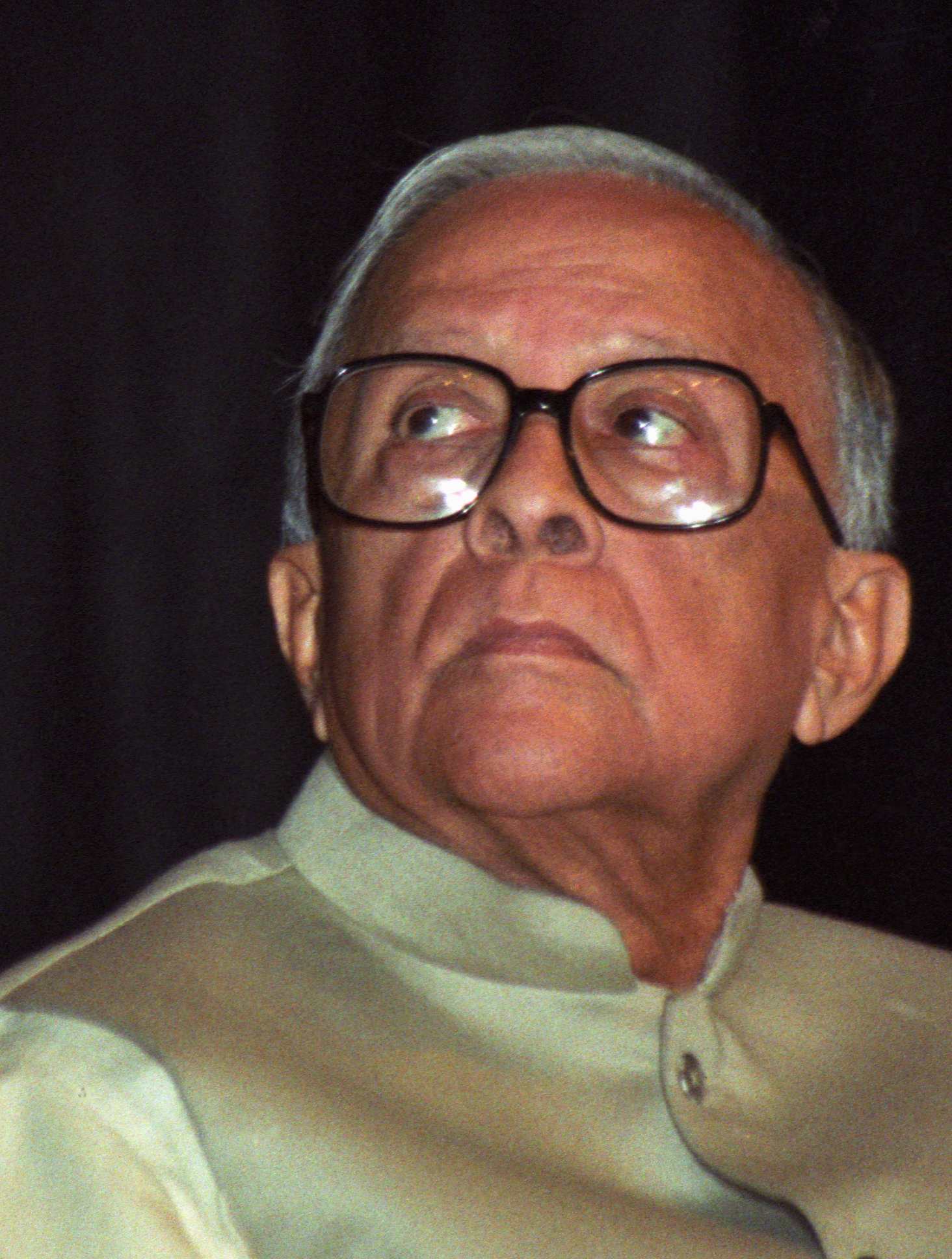

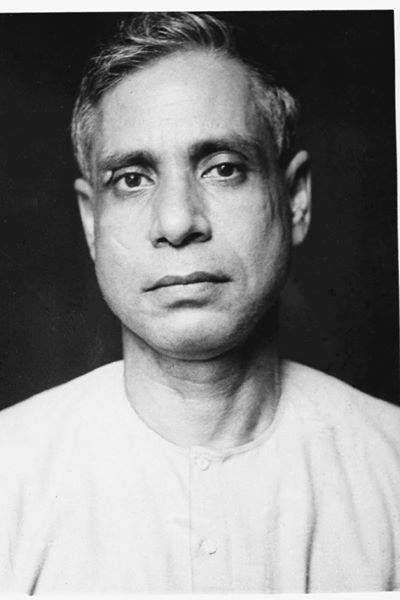

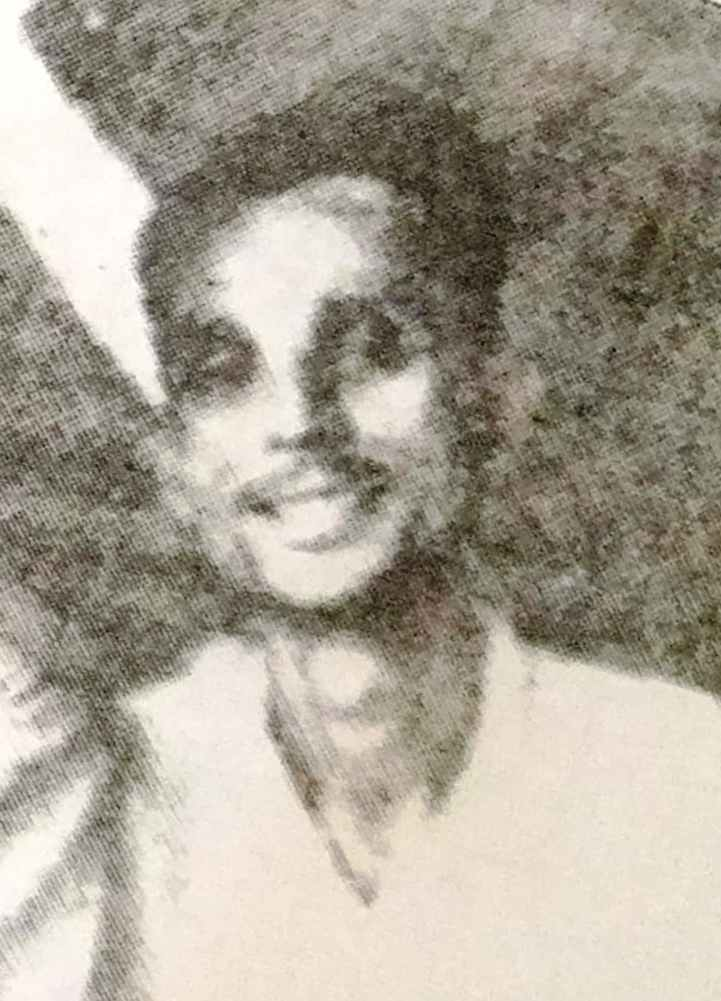
	Majority party	Minority party
Leader	Jyoti Basu	Prafulla Chandra Sen
Party	CPI(M)	INC(R)
Alliance	UF
Leader since	1964	1962
Leader's seat	Baranagar	Arambagh
Last election	18.10%, 43 seats	41.1%, 127 seats
Seats won	80	55
Seat change	▲37	▼72
Popular vote	2,676,981	5,538,622
Percentage	20%	41.3%
Swing	▲1.9 pp	▲0.2 pp
	Third party	Fourth party
Leader	Ajoy Mukherjee	Somnath Lahiri
Party	Bangla Congress	CPI
Alliance	UF	UF
Leader since	1967	1967
Leader's seat	Tamluk	Dhakuria
Last election	10.16%, 34 seats	7.00%, 16 seats
Seats won	33	30
Seat change	▼1	▼14
Popular vote	1,094,654	938,472
Percentage	8.2%	7 %
Swing	▼1.9 pp	▲0.47 pp
Chief Minister before election
President's rule
Elected Chief Minister
Ajoy Kumar Mukherjee
Bangla Congress

Elections were held in Indian state of West Bengal in February 1969 to elect 280 members to the West Bengal Legislative Assembly. United Front formed the government with Ajoy Mukherjee as the Chief Minister. United Front won a landslide 214 seats and 49.7% of the votes.

== Background ==
In the previous assembly election, the Indian National Congress was defeated due to unpopularity of state PCC chief Bijoy Singh Nahar's autocratic style of functioning & chief minister Prafulla Chandra Sen's unpopular decision of implementing food rationing in the state to handle the food crisis caused by famine in the state. The first non-Congress government was formed on 1 March 1967 with Ajoy Mukherjee of Bangla Congress from the United Front (also consisting of CPI, AIFB & BPI) as the chief-minister & Jyoti Basu of CPI(M) from the United Left Front (also consisting of RSP, SUCI(C), SSP, MFB, WPI & RCPI) as the deputy chief minister. However, the coalition government soon fell apart due to the demand of land reforms raised by the Land Minister, CPI(M) leader Hare Krishna Konar, which threatened the rural landed-gentry support-base of the Bangla Congress & legalisation of gherao policy by Labour Minister, SUCI(C) leader Subodh Banerjee. Frequent strikes & protests against big businessmen and industrialists by Communist labour unions was causing them to gradually shift their operations out of the state. In spite of requests from industries minister, Bangla Congress leader Sushil Kumar Dhara, deputy chief-minister Basu refused to remove Banerjee from the labour ministry on grounds of CPI(M)'s ideological similarities with SUCI(C). So, Mukherjee himself sat on a hunger strike at Curzon Park (renamed as Surendranath Park) just in front of Writer's Building, the state secretariat building, demanding Banerjee's resignation. However, there he was heckled by cadres of CPI(M) & SUCI(C).

There were further differences within the government over CPI(M)'s initial soft approach towards Naxalbari uprising on grounds of CPI(M)'s ideological similarities & shared adoration for Mao Zedong with the rebels. CPI(M) also organised strikes demanding the resignation of the Food Minister, independent MLA Prafulla Chandra Ghosh over his poor handling of the food crisis.

In midst of these events, Ghosh formed his own party 'Progressive Democratic Front' with 16 elected members of the Bangla Congress & sent a letter to the Governor Dharma Vira laying claim to the government with the support of the Congress. The Governor dissolved the Ajoy Mukherjee-Jyoti Basu led government without conducting a no-trust vote in the Legislative Assembly & sworn in Ghosh as the new chief minister on 21 November 1967. Mukherjee & Basu put aside their differences & together organised protests against Ghosh's government, leading to increasing political violence between the cadres of CPI(M) & Congress. In midst of the food crisis & escalating political violence among political parties and that between Naxalites & others in the state, President's Rule had to be introduced on 20 February 1968, following which, the previous legislative assembly was dissolved.

== Results ==
Party	Votes	%	Seats	+/–
Communist Party of India (Marxist)	2,676,981	19.97	80	▲37
Indian National Congress	5,538,622	41.32	55	▼72
Bangla Congress	1,094,654	8.17	33	▼1
Communist Party of India	938,472	7.00	30	▲14
All India Forward Bloc	671,664	5.01	21	▲8
Revolutionary Socialist Party (India)	375,983	2.80	12	▲6
Samyukta Socialist Party	249,362	1.86	9	▲2
Socialist Unity Centre of India	202,721	1.51	7	▲3
Praja Socialist Party	175,890	1.31	5	▼2
Lok Sewak Sangh	99,844	0.74	4	NA
Akhil Bharatiya Gorkha League	71,665	0.53	4	NA
Progressive Muslim League	208,574	1.56	3	NA
Revolutionary Communist Party of India	51,181	0.38	2	NA
Workers Party of India	47,391	0.35	2	NA
Indian National Democratic Front	118,650	0.89	1	NA
Marxist Forward Bloc	27,143	0.20	1	NA
Others	374,421	2.79	0	0
Independents	481,092	3.59	11	▼20
Total	13,404,310	100.00	280	0
Valid votes	13,404,310	97.43		
Invalid/blank votes	353,762	2.57		
Total votes	13,758,072	100.00		
Registered voters/turnout	20,685,110	66.51		
Source: ECI

== Elected members ==
Constituency	Reserved for (SC/ST/None)	Member	Party
Mekliganj	None	Amarendra Nath Roy Prouhan	All India Forward Bloc
Mathabhanga	SC	Birendra Nath Roy	Indian National Congress
Cooch Behar West	SC	Prasenjit Barman	Indian National Congress
Sitai	None	Fazle Haque	Indian National Congress
Dinhata	None	Animesh Mukharjee	Indian National Congress
Cooch Behar North	None	Bimal Kanti Basu	All India Forward Bloc
Cooch Behar South	None	Santosh Kumar Roy	Indian National Congress
Tufanganj	SC	Akshay Kumar Barma	Indian National Congress
Kumargram	None	Pijush Kanti Mukherjee	Indian National Congress
Kalchini	ST	Denis Lakra	Indian National Congress
Alipurduars	None	Nani Bhattacharya	Revolutionary Socialist Party
Falakata	SC	Jagadananda Roy	Indian National Congress
Madarihat	ST	A. H. Besterwitch	Revolutionary Socialist Party
Dhupguri	None	Anildhar Guma Neogi	Samyukta Socialist Party
Nagrakata	ST	Budhu Bhagat	Indian National Congress
Mainaguri	SC	Jajneswar Ray	Indian National Congress
Mal	ST	Antoni Topno	Indian National Congress
Jalpaiguri	None	Nares Chandra Chakravorty	Communist Party of India
Rajganj	SC	Kiran Chandra Roy	Indian National Congress
Kalimpong	None	P.L . Subba	Akhil Bharatiya Gorkha League
Darjeeling	None	Deo Prakash Rai	Akhil Bharatiya Gorkha League
Jore Bungalow	None	Nandalal Gurung	Akhil Bharatiya Gorkha League
Siliguri	None	Prem Thapa	Akhil Bharatiya Gorkha League
Phansidewa	ST	Iswar Chandra Tirkey	Indian National Congress
Chopra	None	Choudhury Abdul Karim	Indian National Democratic Front
Goalpokhar	None	Mohamad Salimuddin	Praja Socialist Party
Karandighi	None	Suresh Chandra Sinha	All India Forward Bloc
Raiganj	None	Manash Roy	Communist Party of India
Kaliaganj	SC	Barman Syama Prasad	Indian National Congress
Itahar	None	Abedin Zainal	Indian National Congress
Kushmandi	SC	Jatindra Mohan Roy	Indian National Congress
Gangarampur	None	Ahindra Sarkar	Communist Party of India
Kumarganj	None	Abinash Basu	Bangla Congress
Balurghat	None	Mukal Basu	Revolutionary Socialist Party
Tapan	ST	Nathaniel Murmu	Revolutionary Socialist Party
Habibpur	ST	Nimai Chand Murmu	Communist Party of India
Gajol	ST	Lakshan Saren	Indian National Congress
Kharba	None	Golam Yazdani	Independent
Harishchandrapur	None	Md. Elias Razi	Workers Party of India
Ratua	None	Mohammad Ali	Independent
Malda	None	Md. Gafurur Rahaman	Indian National Congress
Englishbazar	None	Bimal Kanti Das	Communist Party of India
Manikchak	None	Arun Chandra Jha	Indian National Congress
Suzapur	None	A . B . A . G . Khan Choudhry	Indian National Congress
Kaliachak	None	Shamsuddin Ahmad	Indian National Congress
Farakka	None	Sk. Sahadat Hossain	Bangla Congress
Suti	None	Md. Sohorab	Indian National Congress
Jangipur	None	Abdul Haque	Revolutionary Socialist Party
Sagardighi	SC	Kuber Chand Haldar	Bangla Congress
Lalgola	None	Abdus Sattar	Indian National Congress
Bhagabangola	None	Sailendra Nath Adhicary	Samyukta Socialist Party
Nabagram	None	Birendra Narayan Roy	Independent
Murshidabad	None	Mohammad Idris Ali	Indian National Congress
Jalangi	None	Azizur Rahman	Indian National Congress
Domkal	None	Biswas Ekram-ul - Haque	Indian National Congress
Naoda	None	Khan Nasiruddin	Progressive Muslim League
Hariharpara	None	Ahammad Aktabuddin	Progressive Muslim League
Berhampore	None	Sanat Kumar Raha	Communist Party of India
Beldanga	None	Muhammed Khuda Bukhsh	Independent
Kandi	None	Kumar J . C . Sinha	Independent
Khargram	SC	Kumarish Chandra Moulick	Revolutionary Socialist Party
Barwan	None	Amalendra Lal Ray	Revolutionary Socialist Party
Bharatpur	None	Satyapada Bhattacharyya	Revolutionary Socialist Party
Karimpur	None	Nalinaksha Sanyal	Indian National Congress
Tehatta	None	Surat Ali Khan	Indian National Congress
Kaliganj	None	S . M . Fazlur Rahman	Indian National Congress
Nakashipara	SC	Nil Kamal Sarkar	Indian National Congress
Chapra	None	Salil Behari Hundle	Bangla Congress
Nabadwip	None	Sachnidra Mohan Nandy	Indian National Congress
Krishnagar West	None	Amritendu Mukherjee	Communist Party of India
Krishnagar East	None	Kashi Kanta Maitra	Samyukta Socialist Party
Hanskhali	SC	Charuminir Sarkar	Bangla Congress
Santipur	None	M. Makshed Ali	Revolutionary Communist Party of India
Ranaghat West	None	Kundu Gourchandra	Communist Party of India
Ranaghat East	SC	Nitaipada Sarkar	Communist Party of India
Chakdah	None	Subal Chandra Mandal	Bangla Congress
Haringhata	None	Baksh Mohammad Karin	Independent
Bagdaha	SC	Apurba Lal Majumdar	All India Forward Bloc
Bongaon	None	Ajit Kumar Ganguly	Communist Party of India
Gaighata	None	Parul Saha	Bangla Congress
Ashokenagar	None	Sadhan Kumar Sen	Communist Party of India
Barasat	None	Saral Deb	All India Forward Bloc
Rajarhat	SC	Rabindra Nath Mondal	Communist Party of India
Deganga	None	Harun - Or - Rashid	Progressive Muslim League
Habra	None	Tarun Kanti Ghosh	Indian National Congress
Swarupnagar	None	Jaminiranjan Sen	Communist Party of India
Baduria	None	Mir Abdus Sayeed	Communist Party of India
Basirhat	None	A.b. Bandyopadhyaya	Communist Party of India
Hasnabad	None	Abdur Razzaque Khan	Communist Party of India
Hingalganj	SC	Hazari Lal Mondal	Communist Party of India
Gosaba	SC	Ganesh Chandra Mondal	Revolutionary Socialist Party
Sandeshkhali	ST	Sarat Sardar	Communist Party of India
Haroa	SC	Brajendra Nath Sarkar	Bangla Congress
Basanti	None	Ashoke Chaudhuri	Revolutionary Socialist Party
Canning	SC	Naryan Naskar	Indian National Congress
Kultali	SC	Prabodh Purkait	Socialist Unity Centre of India
Joynagar	None	Subodh Banerjee	Socialist Unity Centre of India
Baruipur	SC	Kumud Ranjan Mondal	Samyukta Socialist Party
Sonarpur	SC	Gangadhar Naskar	Communist Party of India
Bhangar	None	A.k.m. Ishaque	Indian National Congress
Jadavpur	None	Bikesh Chandra Guha	Communist Party of India
Behala East	None	Niranjan Mukherjee	Communist Party of India
Behala West	None	Rabin Mukherjee	Communist Party of India
Garden Reach	None	Arun Sen	Communist Party of India
Maheshtola	None	Sudhir Chandra Bhandari	Communist Party of India
Budge Budge	None	Khiti Bhusan Roy Barman	Communist Party of India
Bishnupur West	None	Provash Chandra Roy	Communist Party of India
Bishnupur East	SC	Sundar Kumar Haskar	Communist Party of India
Falta	None	Jyotish Roy	Communist Party of India
Diamond Harbour	None	Abdul Quiyom Molla	Communist Party of India
Magrahat East	SC	Radhika Rajan Pramanik	Communist Party of India
Magrahat West	None	Sachindranath Mondal	Bangla Congress
Kulpi	SC	Murari Mohan Halder	Bangla Congress
Mathurapur	SC	Renupada Halder	Socialist Unity Centre of India
Patharpratima	None	Rabin Mondal	Socialist Unity Centre of India
Kakdwip	None	Hansadhwaj Dhara	Indian National Congress
Sagar	None	Gobardhan Dingal	Bangla Congress
Bijpur	None	Jagadish Chandra Das	Communist Party of India
Naihati	None	Gopal Basu	Communist Party of India
Bhatpara	None	Sitaram Gupta	Communist Party of India
Noapara	None	Jamini Bhuson Saha	Communist Party of India
Titagarh	None	Mohammed Amin	Communist Party of India
Khardah	None	Sadhan Kumar Chakraborty	Communist Party of India
Panihati	None	G.k. Bhattacharyya	Communist Party of India
Kamarhati	None	Radhika Ranjan Banerjee	Communist Party of India
Baranagar	None	Jyoti Basu	Communist Party of India
Dum Dum	None	Tarun Kumar Sen Gupta	Communist Party of India
Cossipur	None	Basu Vishnugopal	Communist Party of India
Shampukur	None	Basu Hemanta Kumar	All India Forward Bloc
Jorabagan	None	Roy Nepal Chandra	Indian National Congress
Jorasanko	None	Deokinandan Poddar	Indian National Congress
Bara Bazar	None	Saraogi Ram Krishna	Indian National Congress
Bow Bazar	None	Bijoy Singh Nahar	Indian National Congress
Chowringhee	None	Ray Siddhartha Shankar	Indian National Congress
Kabitirtha	None	Kalimuddin Shams	All India Forward Bloc
Alipore	None	Mani Sanyal	Communist Party of India
Kalighat	None	Sadhan Gupta	Communist Party of India
Rashbehari Avenue	None	Bejoy Kumar Banerjee	Independent
Tollygunge	None	Niranjan Sen Gupta	Communist Party of India
Dhakuria	None	Somnath Lahiri	Communist Party of India
Ballygunge	None	Jyotibhusan Bhattacharya	Workers Party of India
Beliaghata South	None	Manranjan Baral	Communist Party of India
Entally	None	A.M.O. Ghani	Communist Party of India
Taltola	None	Abul Hassan	Communist Party of India
Sealdah	None	Jatin Chakraborty	Revolutionary Socialist Party
Vidyasagar	None	Samar Kumar Pudra	Communist Party of India
Beliaghata North	None	Krishnapada Ghosh	Communist Party of India
Manicktola	None	Ila Mitra	Communist Party of India
Burtola	None	Nikhil Das	Revolutionary Socialist Party
Belgachia	None	Lakshmicharan Sen	Communist Party of India
Bally	None	Patit Paban Pathak	Communist Party of India
Howrah North	None	Nirmal Kumar Mukherjee	Indian National Congress
Howrah Central	None	Anadi Das	Revolutionary Communist Party of India
Howrah South	None	Pralay Talukdar	Communist Party of India
Panchla	None	Kanai Lal Bhattacharyya	All India Forward Bloc
Domjur	None	Joykesh Mukherjee	Communist Party of India
Jagatballavpur	None	Tarapada Dey	Communist Party of India
Panchla	None	Bibhuti Bhushin Ghosh	All India Forward Bloc
Sankrail	SC	Haran Chandra Hazra	Communist Party of India
Uluberia North	SC	Kalipada Mondal	All India Forward Bloc
Uluberia South	None	Biswanath Das Ghose	All India Forward Bloc
Shyampur	None	Sasabindu Bora	All India Forward Bloc
Bangnan	None	Nirupama Chatterjee	Communist Party of India
Kalyanpur	None	Sunil Kumar Mitra	Bangla Congress
Amta	None	Nitai Bhandari	Communist Party of India
Udaynarayanpur	None	Panna Lal Maji	Communist Party of India
Jangipara	None	Maninda Nath Jana	Communist Party of India
Chanditala	None	Mohamed Abdul Latif	Independent
Uttarapara	None	Monoranjan Hazra	Communist Party of India
Serampore	None	Panchugopal Bhaduri	Communist Party of India
Champdani	None	Haripada Mukherjee	Communist Party of India
Chandernagore	None	Bhabani Mukehjee	Communist Party of India
Singur	None	Gopal Bandopadhaya	Communist Party of India
Haripal	None	Amales Chadra Hazumdar	Samyukta Socialist Party
Chinsurah	None	Sambhu Charan Bhose	All India Forward Bloc
Polba	None	Brajo Gopal Neogy	Communist Party of India
Balagarh	SC	Hbinash Pramanik	Communist Party of India
Pandua	None	Deb Narayan Chakrabarty	Communist Party of India
Dhaniakhali	SC	Kripa Sindhu Saha	All India Forward Bloc
Tarakeswar	None	Ram Chatterjee	Marxist Forward Bloc
Pursurah	None	Santi Mohun Roy	Indian National Congress
Khanakul	SC	Madan Saha	Communist Party of India
Arambagh	None	Prafulla Chandra Sen	Indian National Congress
Goghat	SC	Ajit Kumar Biswas	All India Forward Bloc
Chandrakona	None	Saroshi Choudhury	Communist Party of India
Ghatal	SC	Nanda Rani Dal	Communist Party of India
Daspur	None	Mrigendra Bhattacharjya	Communist Party of India
Panskura West	None	Ahindra Mishra	Bangla Congress
Panskura East	None	Geeta Mukhopadhyay	Communist Party of India
Moyna	None	Kanai Bhowmick	Communist Party of India
Tamluk	None	Ajoy Kumar Mikhopadhyay	Bangla Congress
Mahishadal	None	Sushil Kumar Dhara	Bangla Congress
Sutahata	SC	Harahari Deb	Indian National Congress
Nandigram	None	Bhupal Chandra Panda	Communist Party of India
Narghat	None	Subodh Chandra Maity	Indian National Congress
Bhagabanpur	None	Maity Abha	Indian National Congress
Khajuri	SC	Das Paresh	Bangla Congress
Contai North	None	Subodh Gopal Guchhait	Praja Socialist Party
Contai South	None	Das Sudhir	Praja Socialist Party
Ramnagar	None	Balailal Das Mahapatra	Praja Socialist Party
Egra	None	Pahati Bibhuti	Praja Socialist Party
Mugberia	None	Roy Chaudhury Biswabrata	Bangla Congress
Pataspur	None	K.d. Mahapatra	Communist Party of India
Pingla	None	Gouranga Samanta	Communist Party of India
Debra	None	Bijoy Krishna Samanta	Indian National Congress
Keshpur	SC	Gangapada Kuar	Bangla Congress
Garhbeta East	SC	Krishna Prasad Duley	Communist Party of India
Garhbeta West	None	Roy Soroj	Communist Party of India
Salbani	None	Amulya Ratan Mahata	Bangla Congress
Midnapur	None	Kamakhya Charan Ghosh	Communist Party of India
Kharagpur	None	Gan Singh Sohanpal	Indian National Congress
Kharagpur Local	None	Deben Das	Communist Party of India
Narayangarh	None	Laha Mihirkumar	Bangla Congress
Dantan	None	Debendra Nath Das	Bangla Congress
Keshiari	ST	Budhan Chandra Tudu	Indian National Congress
Nayagarm	ST	Hansda Jagatrati	Bangla Congress
Gopiballavpur	None	Kar Dhananjoy	Samyukta Socialist Party
Jhargram	None	De Panchkari	Bangla Congress
Binpur	ST	Saren Joyram	Communist Party of India
Banduan	ST	Budheswar Majhi	Indian National Congress
Manbazar	None	Girish Mahato	Lok Sewak Sangh
Balarampur	ST	Gobardhan Majhi	Lok Sewak Sangh
Arsa	None	Dahan Chandra Kuiri	All India Forward Bloc
Jhalda	None	Debendra Nath Mahata	Indian National Congress
Jaipur	None	Ram Krishna Mahato	Indian National Congress
Purulia	None	Bibhuti Bhusan Das Gupta	Lok Sewak Sangh
Para	SC	Tinkori Bouri	Bangla Congress
Raghunathpur	SC	Hari Pado Bouri	Socialist Unity Centre of India
Kashipur	None	Prabir Kumar Mallick	Communist Party of India
Hura	None	Saharendra Ojha	Lok Sewak Sangh
Taldangra	None	Mohini Mohan Panda	Communist Party of India
Raipur	ST	Bhabatosh Soren	Bangla Congress
Ranibandh	ST	Suchand Saren	Communist Party of India
Indpur	SC	Gour Lohar	Bangla Congress
Chhatna	None	Singh Sudarson	Samyukta Socialist Party
Gangajalghati	SC	Mandal Nabadurga	Bangla Congress
Barjora	None	Aswini Kumar Raj	Communist Party of India
Bankura	None	Bireswar Ghosh	Communist Party of India
Onda	None	Anil Kumar Mukherjee	All India Forward Bloc
Vishnupur	None	Sasthidas Sarkar	Bangla Congress
Kotulpur	None	Niranjan Bhadra	Bangla Congress
Indas	SC	Abani Kumar Saha	Bangla Congress
Sonamukhi	SC	Sukhendu Khan	Communist Party of India
Hirapur	None	Bamapada Mukherjee	Communist Party of India
Kulti	None	Tarak Nath Chakraborty	Samyukta Socialist Party
Barabani	None	Sunil Basu Roy	Communist Party of India
Asansol	None	Lokes Ghosh	Communist Party of India
Raniganj	None	Haradhan Roy	Communist Party of India
Jamuria	SC	Amarendra Mondal	Indian National Congress
Ukhra	SC	Lakhan Bagdi	Communist Party of India
Durgapur	None	Dilip Kumar Mazumdar	Communist Party of India
Faridpur	None	Manoranjan Baksi	Bangla Congress
Ausgram	SC	Krishna Chandra Halder	Communist Party of India
Bhatar	None	Aswini Roy	Communist Party of India
Galsi	None	Phakir Chandra Roy	Independent
Burdwan North	None	Debarata Datta	Communist Party of India
Burdwan South	None	Benoy Krishna Choudhuri	Communist Party of India
Khandaghosh	SC	Gobardhan Pakray	Samyukta Socialist Party
Raina	None	Guha Panchu Gopal	Communist Party of India
Jamalpur	SC	Basudeb Malik	Bangla Congress
Memari	None	Konar Benoy Krishna	Communist Party of India
Kalna	None	Hare Krishna Konar	Communist Party of India
Nadanghat	None	Syed Abul Mansur Habibullah	Communist Party of India
Manteswar	None	K.n. Hazra Choudhury	Communist Party of India
Purbasthali	None	Mollah Humayun Kabir	Communist Party of India
Katwa	None	Thakur Nityananda	Indian National Congress
Mangalkot	None	Nikhilananda Sar	Communist Party of India
Ketugram	SC	Ramgati Mondal	Communist Party of India
Nanur	SC	Banamali Das	Communist Party of India
Bolpur	None	Pannalal Das Gupta	Independent
Labhpur	None	Radhanath Chttoraj	Communist Party of India
Dubrajpur	None	Bhakti Bhusan Mondal	All India Forward Bloc
Rajnagar	SC	Siddheswar Mandal	All India Forward Bloc
Suri	None	Protiva Mukherjee	Socialist Unity Centre of India
Mahammad Bazar	None	Dwarika Prasonna Roy	Bangla Congress
Mayureswar	SC	Panchanan Let	Communist Party of India
Rampurhat	None	Sasanka Sekhar Mongal	All India Forward Bloc
Hansan	SC	Mondal Mrityunjoy	All India Forward Bloc
Nalhati	None	Golam Mamiuddin	Independent
Murarai	None	Bazle Ahmad	Socialist Unity Centre of India
