= Deo Prakash Rai =

Indian politician

Deo Prakash Rai (December 1926 – 1981) was an Indian politician. A former Gorkha Brigade soldier, he was the general secretary of the All India Gorkha League and was made a minister in the West Bengal state government in 1967, 1969 and 1971.

== Youth ==
Rai was born at Tukvar Tea Estate in Darjeeling in December 1926. He was the son of K.S. Sotang. He went to school at the Arung School of Education, obtaining a Higher English Certificate of Education.

== Soldier ==
Rai served in the Gorkha Brigade for three years during the Second World War. He reached the rank of colour sergeant. In 1950, he was arrested in Malaya and deported, having been denounced as a "communist agent" by John Cross, chief instructor of the new Army School of Education (Gurkhas).

== In politics and trade unionism ==
Rai was general secretary of the All India Gorkha League. In 1946, the Communist Party of India (CPI) proposed the notion of creating a "Gorkhasthan", merging Nepal, south Sikkim and the Darjeeling hills. The CPI tried to convince the Gorkha League to support the Gorkhasthan proposal, but Rai categorically opposed it. As a trade unionist, he was the founder of Darjeeling Chiya Kaman Shramik Sangha. He was patron of the Darjeeling Cultural Institute. As an author, he wrote many poems and short stories in the Nepali language.

== Legislator ==
Rai represented the Darjeeling constituency in the West Bengal Legislative Assembly from 1957 until his death.

== Minister ==
Rai was named Minister for Scheduled Castes and Tribes Welfare in the 1967 and 1969 United Front governments of West Bengal. He was again named as Minister in the 1971 state government, now in charge of Scheduled Castes Tribal Welfare and Tourism.

For a quarter of a century, Rai was the dominant politician in the Darjeeling hills. He received criticism from within his own community, which accused him of having entered into a secret pact with the state government in Calcutta. While Raj was a minister in three successive state cabinets, no progress on administrative autonomy for the Darjeeling hills was made.

== 1977 election ==
At the time of the 1977 elections, Rai was weakened by illness.

Rai died in 1981. After his death, his party was weakened and more militant factions such as Pranta Parishad and the Gorkha National Liberation Front came to dominate the political field in the hills.
