= Bangla Congress =

Political party in West Bengal, India

- Abbreviation: BC
- Leader: Ajoy Mukherjee
- Founder: Ajoy Mukherjee
- Founded: 1966 (60 years ago)
- Dissolved: 1971 (55 years ago)
- Split from: Indian National Congress
- Merged into: Indian National Congress
- Headquarters: Calcutta
- Ideology: Bengali nationalism Democratic socialism Regionalism; Civic nationalism Left-wing populism
- Political position: Centre-left to left-wing
- Regional affiliation: United Front (1967–1971)
- Colours: Blue

The Bangla Congress was a regional political party in the Indian state of West Bengal. It was formed through a split in the Indian National Congress in 1966 and later co-governed with the Communist Party of India (Marxist) (CPI(M)) in two United Front governments, the first lasting from 15 March 1967 to 2 November 1967, the second from 25 February 1969 to 19 March 1970.

== History ==
Mainly the Left Wing of the Bengal Congress, represented by Ajoy Mukherjee, Pranab Mukherjee, Siddhartha Shankar Ray, A. B. A. Ghani Khan Choudhury, Abha Maiti, Sushil Kumar Dhara revolted against the leadership of the old conservative elites of "the Syndicate" like Prafulla Chandra Sen and Atulya Ghosh in 1966 owing to the policies of the Prafulla Sen government during the Food Movement. Sushil Kumar Dhara was the state secretary of the newly formed Bangla Congress.

The revolt was mainly led by younger leaders of the Congress and enjoyed widespread support among the rural landowning and trading classes as well as the middle castes of rural Bengal, such as the Mahishyas, Aguris and the Sadgops who looked upon an alliance with the Proletarian Left Front as useful against the dominance of the Calcutta-oriented Congress leadership which was seen to favour the Calcutta-based, Marwari-owned large private industries and British business interests too much.

The party had a strong base in Midnapore, Hooghly, Nadia, Murshidabad and all of North Bengal and a big plank was development of rural areas and small towns as opposed to the Calcutta-obsessed approach of the Congress-led West Bengal Government.

Ajoy Mukherjee, a veteran Congress leader from Tamluk, was the Chief Minister in both governments formed by the Coalition and till date, he remains the only Chief Minister of West Bengal not to reside in a Calcutta postal address. Other later Congress leaders like Priya Ranjan DasMunshi, Manas Bhunia and Somen Mitra also started their careers as lower rung student leaders of the Bangla Congress split. Sukumar Roy, a dissident leader of the party, aligned with CPI(M), and later formed a new political party - Biplobi Bangla Congress.

On 19 March 1970 the second United Front government fell as a result of the breakdown of the alliance between the Bangla Congress and the Communist Party of India (Marxist). Due to the Land Reform movement led by Communist leaders Benoy Choudhury and Hare Krishna Konar which threatened the interests of the landowning Middle/backward castes that supported the Bangla Congress.

The Bangla Congress then went into rapid decline and was later reunified with the Indian National Congress.

== Electoral history ==
=== General election results ===
| Election Year | Lok Sabha | Seats contested | Seats won | ± seats | Overall Votes | Percentage of votes | State (seats) |
|---|---|---|---|---|---|---|---|
| 1967 | 4th Lok Sabha | 7 | 5 | ▲ New | 1,204,356 | 0.83 | West Bengal |
| 1971 | 5th Lok Sabha | 14 | 1 | ▼4 | 518,781 | 0.35 | West Bengal |

=== West Bengal Legislative Assembly election results ===
| Election Year | Seats contested | Seats won | ± seats | Overall Votes | Percentage of votes |
|---|---|---|---|---|---|
| 1967 | 80 | 34 / 280 | ▲ New | 1,286,028 | 10.16 |
| 1969 | 49 | 33 / 280 | ▼1 | 1,094,654 | 8.17 |
| 1971 | 137 | 5 / 280 | ▼29 | 695,376 | |

== See also ==
- Indian National Congress breakaway parties
