= Tamser Ali =

West Bengal politician

Member of West Bengal Legislative Assembly
- In office 2001–2011
- Preceded by: Shivendra Narayan Chaudhury
- Succeeded by: Rabindra Nath Ghosh
- Constituency: Natabari

Personal details
- Born: August 27, 1953 (age 72) Deocharai More, Cooch Behar, West Bengal
- Party: Communist Party of India (Marxist)

Tamser Ali (born 27 August 1953) is an Indian politician belonging to the Communist Party of India (Marxist). He was the MLA of Natabari Assembly constituency in the West Bengal Legislative Assembly.

== Early life and education ==
Ali was born on 27 August 1953 to a Bengali family of Muslim Nashya Shaikhs in Deocharai, Cooch Behar, West Bengal. He is the son of Sultan Ali and Pin Pini Bewa. Ali completed his education at the Deocharai High School.

== Personal life ==
Ali married Zelekha Bibi, daughter of Bhomaruddin Mian. They have a son and two daughters.

== Career ==
Ali was a primary school teacher, and a member of the Cooch Behar District Primary Education Council. He contested in the 2001 West Bengal Legislative Assembly election where he ran as a Communist Party of India (Marxist) candidate succeeding Shivendra Narayan Chaudhury's 24 year long tenure as MLA for Natabari. Ali subsequently joined the Committee on Subordinate Legislation, and from 2003 to 2006, served in the Committee on Privileges and the Standing Committee on Health and Family Welfare. He was re-elected from the same constituency at the 2006 West Bengal Legislative Assembly election. Ali contested in the 2011 and 2016 elections, but lost to All India Trinamool Congress candidate Rabindra Nath Ghosh on both occasions.
