= Maheshwar, Cooch Behar =

Village in Cooch Behar District of West Bengal

Maheshwar মহেশ্বর
- Village
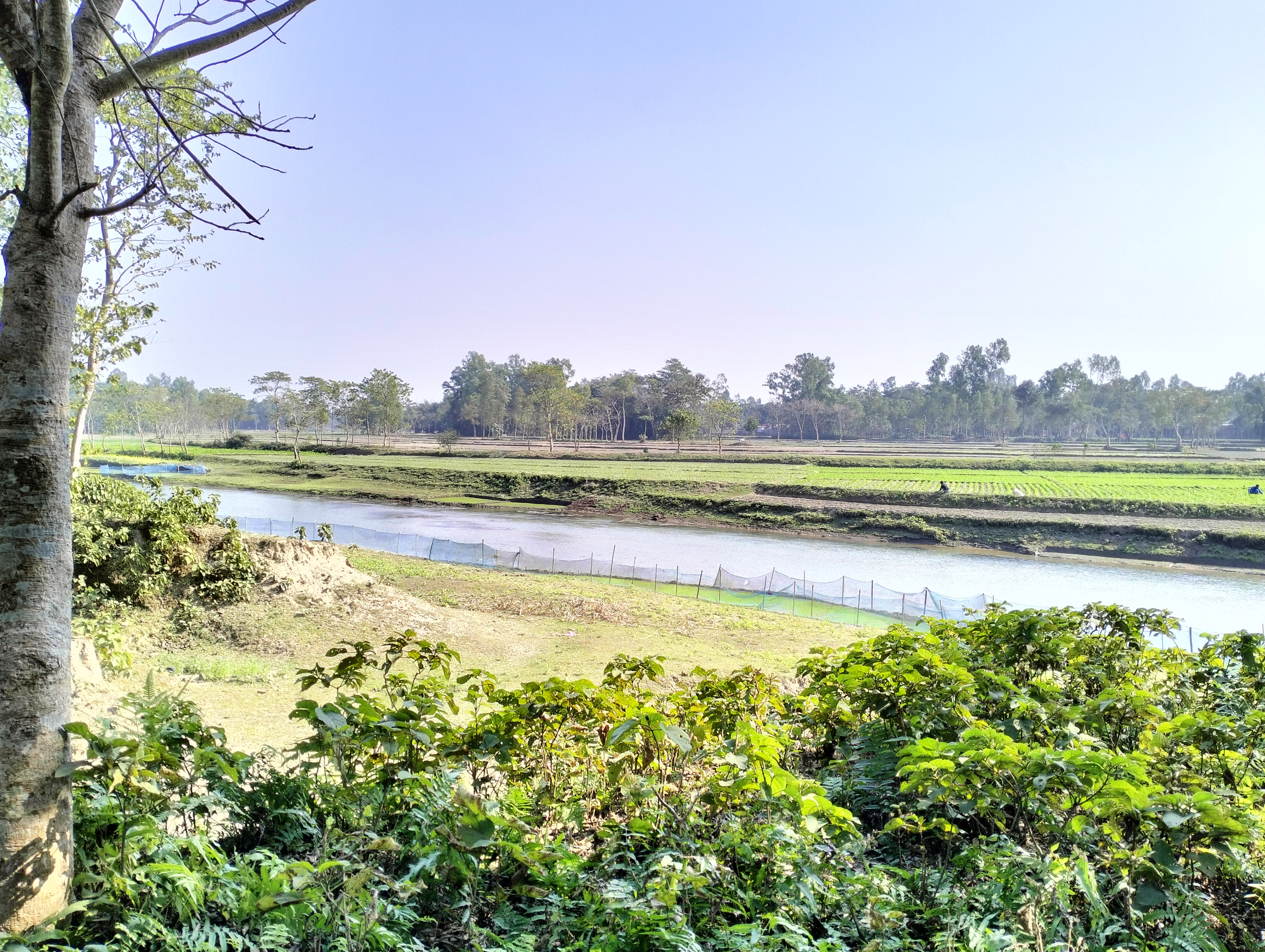
- Baniyadaha River During Winter Season 2023.

- Location in West Bengal, India Maheshwar (India)
- Coordinates: 26°2′46.66″N 89°29′29.84″E
- Country: India
- State: West Bengal
- District: Cooch Behar

Government
  - Type: Panchayat
  - Body: Okrabari Gram Panchayat

Area
  - Total: 99.7 ha (246 acres)

Population (2011)
  - Total: 1,393
  - Density: 1,400/km^{2} (3,620/sq mi)

Language
  - Official: Bengali, English
- Time zone: UTC+5:30 (IST)
- PIN: 736135
- Telephone/STD code: 03581
- Vehicle registration: WB 64
- Lok Sabha constituency: Cooch Behar
- Vidhan Sabha constituency: Sitai
- Website: coochbehar.gov.in

Maheshwar (Bengali: মহেশ্বর) is a village of Dinhata-I CD block, Dinhata sub-division in Cooch Behar district of West Bengal, a state of India.

== Demographics ==
According to the 2011 Census of India, Maheshwar had a total population of 1393, of which 745 (53%) were males and 648 (47%) were females. The population in the age range 0–6 years of age was 193. The total number of literate persons in Maheshwar is 878 (63%). The village consists of 311 households families.

Population and House Data
Particulars	Total	Male	Female
Total no. of houses	331	-	-
Population	1,393	745	648
Child (0–6)	193	116	77
Literacy Rate	73.17%	79.81%	65.85%

== Transport ==
The village is 15 km away from city Dinhata. And nearly 40 km away from district headquarter of Cooch Behar district.

== Education ==
There is only two educational institute for Primary Education.

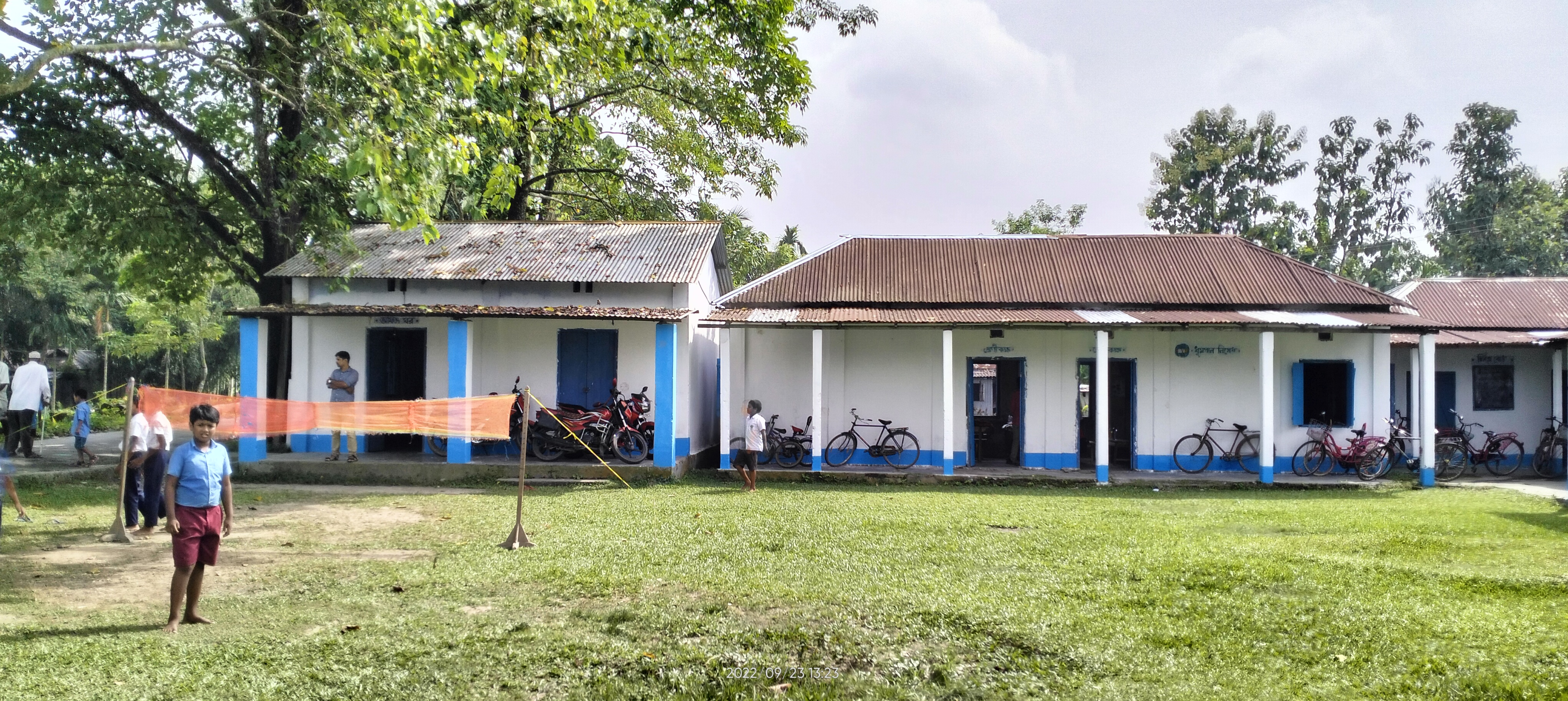
1. Maheshwar 5th Plan Primary School in the year 2022.
  Maheswar 5th Plan Primary School.
2. Maheswar Shishu Shiksha Kendra.

== See also ==
- Gitaldaha
- Andaranfulbari
- Bamanhat
- Gobra Chhara Nayarhat
