= Cooch Behar Uttar Assembly constituency =

Vidhan Sabha constituency in West Bengal, India

Cooch Behar Uttar (SC)
- Constituency No. 3 for the West Bengal Legislative Assembly
- Interactive Map Outlining Cooch Behar Uttar (SC) Assembly Constituency

Constituency details
- Country: India
- Region: East India
- State: West Bengal
- District: Cooch Behar
- Lok Sabha constituency: Cooch Behar (SC)
- Established: 1951
- Total electors: 264,197
- Reservation: SC

Member of Legislative Assembly
- 18th West Bengal Legislative Assembly
- Incumbent Sukumar Ray
- Party: Bharatiya Janata Party
- Elected year: 2026

Most Successful parties from Coochbehar North/Uttar (SC) assembly
1. All India Forward Bloc (10 times) (50.0%)
2. Indian National Congress (8 times) (40.0%)
3. Bharatiya Janata Party (2 times) (10.0%)

Cooch Behar Uttar Assembly constituency is an assembly constituency in Cooch Behar district in the Indian state of West Bengal. It is reserved for scheduled castes.

== Overview ==
As per orders of the Delimitation Commission, No. 3 Cooch Behar Uttar Assembly constituency (SC) covers Cooch Behar II community development block.

Cooch Behar Uttar Assembly constituency is part of No. 1 Cooch Behar (Lok Sabha constituency) (SC).

== Members of the Legislative Assembly ==
Year	Member	Party
As Cooch Behar Assembly Constituency
1952 (Note: In 1952 and 1957 it was dual-member constituency consisted of a single constituency that elected two representatives.)	Maziruddin Ahmed	Indian National Congress
1952	Jatindra Nath Singha Sarkar	Indian National Congress
1957	Maziruddin Ahmed	Indian National Congress
1957	Satish Chandra Roy Singha	Indian National Congress
As Cooch Behar North Assembly Constituency
1962	Sunil Das Gupta	All India Forward Bloc
1967	M. R. Tar	Indian National Congress
1969	Bimal Kanti Basu	All India Forward Bloc
1971	Sunil Kar	Indian National Congress
1972	Sunil Kar	Indian National Congress
1977	Aparajita Goppi	All India Forward Bloc
1982	Aparajita Goppi	All India Forward Bloc
1987	Aparajita Goppi	All India Forward Bloc
1991	Bimal Kanti Basu	All India Forward Bloc
1996	Mihir Goswami	Indian National Congress
2001	Dipak Chandra Sarker	All India Forward Bloc
2006	Dipak Chandra Sarker	All India Forward Bloc
As Cooch Behar Uttar Assembly Constituency
2011	Nagendra Nath Roy	All India Forward Bloc
2016	Nagendra Nath Roy	All India Forward Bloc
2021	Sukumar Ray	Bharatiya Janata Party
2026	Sukumar Ray	Bharatiya Janata Party

== Election results ==
Vote share of Winning candidates
2026	61.11%
2021	49.40%
2016	43.63%
2011	45.11%
2006	48.37%
2001	46.88%
1996	47.25%
1991	47.31%
1987	54.74%
1982	57.15%
1977	63.07%
1972	58.84%
1971	49.58%
1969	50.98%
1967	37.73%
1962	62.93%
1957 (Seat-1)	24.85%
1957 (Seat-2)	23.49%
1952 (Seat-2)	25.65%
1952 (Seat-1)	27.77%

=== 2026 ===
In the 2026 West Bengal Legislative Assembly election, Sukumar Ray of BJP defeated Partha Pratim Ray of TMC by 70384 votes.

2026 West Bengal Legislative Assembly election: Cooch Behar Uttar (SC)
Party	Candidate	Votes	%	±%
BJP	Sukumar Ray	155,327	61.11	▲11.71
AITC	Partha Pratim Ray	84,943	33.42	▼9.98
CPI(M)	Pranay Karjee	5,293	2.08	New entry
INC	Partha Pratim Ishor	1,939	0.76	▼22.32
IND	Panchanan Roy	961	0.38	New entry
IND	Sukumar Roy	895	0.35	New entry
AMB	Upendra Nath Basunia	874	0.34	▲0.08
IND	Sukumar Roy	805	0.32	New entry
IND	Naresh Chandra Roy	403	0.16	▼0.41
SUCI(C)	Swapan Kumar Barman	388	0.15	▼0.42
IND	Uttam Barman	307	0.12	New entry
KPP(U)	Nirmal Kumar Roy	221	0.09	▼0.37
NOTA	Nota	1,819	0.72	▲0.08
Majority		70,384	27.69	▲21.69
Turnout		254,175	96.21	▲10.02
Registered electors		264,197		▼6.64
BJP hold		Swing	10.84	

=== 2021 ===
2021 West Bengal Legislative Assembly election: Cooch Behar Uttar (SC)
Party	Candidate	Votes	%	±%
BJP	Sukumar Roy	120,483	49.40	
AITC	Binay Krishna Barman	105,868	43.40	
AIFB	Nagendra Nath Roy	11,475	4.70	
NOTA	None of the above	1,570	0.64	
SUCI(C)	Anil Chandra Roy	1,386	0.57	
IND	Naresh Chandra Roy	1,379	0.57	
KPPU	Samaresh Ray	1,127	0.46	
AMB	Gopal Roy	628	0.26	
Majority		14,615	6.00	
Turnout		243,916	86.19	
BJP gain from AIFB		Swing		

=== 2016 ===
2016 West Bengal Legislative Assembly election: Cooch Behar Uttar (SC)
Party	Candidate	Votes	%	±%
AIFB	Nagendra Nath Roy	97,629	43.63	
AITC	Parimal Barman	85,336	38.14	
BJP	Sukumar Roy	30,025	13.42	
NOTA	None of the Above	2,649	1.18	
IND	Prafulla Kumar Das	1,843	0.82	
IND	Gopal Roy	1,765	0.79	
SUCI(C)	Anilchandra Roy	1,731	0.77	
AMB	Haribala Ray	1,507	0.67	
IND	Naresh Chandra Roy	1,286	0.57	
Majority		12,293	5.49	
Turnout		223,771	86.49	
AIFB hold		Swing		

=== 2011 ===
2011 West Bengal Legislative Assembly election: Cooch Behar Uttar (SC)
Party	Candidate	Votes	%	±%
AIFB	Nagendra Nath Roy	84,825	45.11	
AITC	Prasenjit Barman	82,628	43.94	
BJP	Malati Rava Roy	12,608	6.71	
IND	Nirmal Kumar Roy	4,745	2.52	
IND	Ratan Barman	1,883	1.00	
IND	Kulen Das	1,343	0.71	
Majority		2,197	1.17	
Turnout		188,032	85.96	
AIFB hold		Swing		

=== 2006 ===
2006 West Bengal Legislative Assembly election: Cooch Behar North
Party	Candidate	Votes	%	±%
AIFB	Dipak Chandra Sarkar	67,997	48.37	
AITC	Mihir Goswami	36,325	25.84	
INC	Shyamal Kumar Chowdhury	32,446	23.08	
IND	Nikhil Roy	2,359	1.68	
AMB	Hari Bala Roy	1,439	1.02	
Majority		31,672	22.53	
Turnout		140,566		
AIFB hold		Swing		

=== 2001 ===
2001 West Bengal Legislative Assembly election: Cooch Behar North
Party	Candidate	Votes	%	±%
AIFB	Dipak Chandra Sarker	57,170	46.88	
AITC	Mihir Goswami	38,813	31.83	
IND	Chandan Kundu	11,474	9.41	
BJP	Kankan Bhowmik	6,083	4.99	
IND	Prakash Roy	4,671	3.83	
NCP	Usha Roy	1,301	1.07	
BSP	Papiya Barman	1,225	1.00	
AMB	Haribala Roy	1,218	1.00	
Majority		18,357	15.05	
Turnout		122,026	77.47	
AIFB gain from INC		Swing		

=== 1996 ===
1996 West Bengal Legislative Assembly election: Cooch Behar North
Party	Candidate	Votes	%	±%
INC	Mihir Goswami	59,375	47.25	
AIFB	Aparajita Goppi	52,511	41.79	
BJP	Haripada Paul	10,070	8.01	
FB(S)	Bimal Kanti Basu	1,703	1.36	
BSP	Papiya Barman	1,268	1.01	
IND	Badal Roy	328	0.26	
AMB	Nirendra Prasad Karjee	238	0.19	
IND	Subhas Chakraborty	172	0.14	
Majority		6,864	5.46	
Turnout		125,774	84.42	
INC gain from AIFB		Swing		

=== 1991 ===
1991 West Bengal Legislative Assembly election: Cooch Behar North
Party	Candidate	Votes	%	±%
AIFB	Bimal Kanti Basu	52,425	47.31	
INC	Mihir Goswami	41,402	37.36	
BJP	Ramdhan Ray Choudhuri	15,588	14.07	
BSP	Biswanath Biswas	703	0.63	
AMB	Santosh Modak	384	0.35	
IND	Khandaker Nazma	321	0.29	
Majority		11,023	9.95	
Turnout		112,472	80.28	
AIFB hold		Swing		

=== 1987 ===
1987 West Bengal Legislative Assembly election: Cooch Behar North
Party	Candidate	Votes	%	±%
AIFB	Aparajita Goppi	49,172	54.74	
INC	Mihir Kumar Goswami	39,392	43.85	
BJP	Shyamal Krishna Sarkar	615	0.68	
IND	Kamaleswar Sarkar	419	0.47	
IND	Santosh Kumar Nandi	234	0.26	
Majority		9,780	10.89	
Turnout		91,208	78.05	
AIFB hold		Swing		

=== 1982 ===
1982 West Bengal Legislative Assembly election: Cooch Behar North
Party	Candidate	Votes	%	±%
AIFB	Aparajita Goppi	46,810	57.15	
INC	Sunil Kar	33,873	41.36	
IND	Rabindra Nath Sarkar	766	0.94	
IND	Bhabeswar Das	458	0.56	
Majority		12,937	15.79	
Turnout		83,261	82.16	
AIFB hold		Swing		

=== 1977 ===
1977 West Bengal Legislative Assembly election: Cooch Behar North
Party	Candidate	Votes	%	±%
AIFB	Aparajita Goppi	32,792	63.07	
INC	Bimal Chandra Dhar	8,592	16.53	
JP	Arun Kumar Bhattacharjya	5,419	10.42	
IND	Shyamal Kumar Choudhury	3,008	5.79	
CPI	Debi Prosad Neogi	1,685	3.24	
IND	Haridas Guha	417	0.80	
IND	Samar De	78	0.15	
Majority		24,200	46.54	
Turnout		52,808	58.82	
AIFB gain from INC		Swing		

=== 1972 ===
1972 West Bengal Legislative Assembly election: Cooch Behar North
Party	Candidate	Votes	%	±%
INC	Sunil Kar	29,142	58.84	
AIFB	Aparajita Goppi	19,846	40.07	
INC(O)	Jaharuddin Mia	541	1.09	
Majority		9,296	18.77	
Turnout		50,619	61.33	
INC hold		Swing		

=== 1971 ===
1971 West Bengal Legislative Assembly election: Cooch Behar North
Party	Candidate	Votes	%	±%
INC	Sunil Kar	25,465	49.58	
CPI(M)	Shirendra Narayan Choudhury	17,800	34.66	
AIFB	Mohitlal Chakaraborty	6,455	12.57	
INC(O)	Dwijendra Arayan Dutt	1,075	2.09	
BAC	Paliab Das Gupta	562	1.09	
Majority		7,665	14.92	
Turnout		53,598	64.02	
INC gain from AIFB		Swing		

=== 1969 ===
1969 West Bengal Legislative Assembly election: Cooch Behar North
Party	Candidate	Votes	%	±%
AIFB	Bimal Kanti Basu	23,810	50.98	
INC	Mati Ranjan Tar	21,514	46.06	
LKD	Bhattacharya Sibendra Kuma	599	1.28	
PBI	Santosh Kumar Sarkar	578	1.24	
ABJS	Hari Pada Paul	208	0.45	
Majority		2,296	4.92	
Turnout		48,025	67.21	
AIFB gain from INC		Swing		

=== 1967 ===
1967 West Bengal Legislative Assembly election: Cooch Behar North
Party	Candidate	Votes	%	±%
INC	M. R. Tar	17,440	37.73	
AIFB	S. D. Gupta	15,293	33.08	
CPI(M)	G. C. Saha	8,940	19.34	
SWA	N. C. Ghosh	4,554	9.85	
Majority		2,147	4.65	
Turnout		49,354	69.60	
INC gain from AIFB		Swing		

=== 1962 ===
1962 West Bengal Legislative Assembly election: Cooch Behar North
Party	Candidate	Votes	%	±%
AIFB	Sunil Das Gupta	19,296	62.93	
INC	Maziruddin Ahmed	11,366	37.07	
Majority		7,930	25.86	
Turnout		31,677	44.03	
AIFB win (new seat)				

=== 1957 ===
1957 West Bengal Legislative Assembly election: Cooch Behar (SC) (2 seats)
Party	Candidate	Votes	%	±%
INC	Maziruddin Ahmed	23,187	24.85	
INC	Satish Chandra Roy Singha	21,914	23.49	
CPI	Dinesh Chandra Karjee	18,783	20.13	
FB(M)	Naresh Chandra Bose	17,233	18.47	
IND	Sonamani Devi	8,316	8.91	
IND	Surendra Nath Lahiri	3,863	4.14	
Majority		1,273	1.36	
Turnout		93,296	91.74	
INC hold		Swing		

=== 1952 ===
1952 West Bengal Legislative Assembly election: Cooch Behar (2 seats)
Party	Candidate	Votes	%	±%
INC	Maziruddin Ahmed	17,595	27.77	
INC	Jatindra Nath Singha Sarkar	16,251	25.65	
FB(MG)	Naresh Chandra Basu	8,297	13.09	
CPI	Dinesh Chandra Singha	6,944	10.96	
IND	Debendrananda Chakravarti	2,788	4.40	
KMPP	Hirendra Nath Dutt	2,021	3.19	
Socialist	Baijnath Viswakarma	2,007	3.17	
IND	Jaladhar Saha	1,857	2.93	
Socialist	Brajendra Nath Roy	1,793	2.83	
IND	Gobinda Chandra Roy	1,550	2.45	
IND	Girija Kanta Chakravarti	1,275	2.01	
IND	Debendra Nath Eshore	988	1.56	
Majority		1,344	2.12	
Turnout		63,366	70.79	
INC win (new seat)				
