= Cooch Behar Lok Sabha constituency =

Lok Sabha Constituency in West Bengal, India

Coordinates: 26°19′27″N 89°27′04″E

Cooch Behar WB-1
- Lok Sabha constituency
- Interactive Map Outlining Cooch Behar Lok Sabha Constituency

Constituency details
- Country: India
- Region: East India
- State: West Bengal
- Assembly constituencies: Mathabhanga; Cooch Behar Uttar; Cooch Behar Dakshin; Sitalkuchi; Sitai; Dinhata; Natabari
- Established: 1957
- Total electors: 19,66,893 (2024)
- Reservation: SC

Member of Parliament
- 18th Lok Sabha
- Incumbent Jagadish Basunia
- Party: NCPI
- Alliance: NDA
- Elected year: 2024

Cooch Behar Lok Sabha constituency is one of the 543 parliamentary constituencies in India. The constituency centres on Cooch Behar in West Bengal. All the seven assembly segments of No. 1 Cooch Behar Lok Sabha constituency are in Cooch Behar district. The seat is reserved for scheduled castes.

== Assembly segments ==
Parliamentary constituencies in West Bengal1. Cooch Behar, 2. Alipurduars, 3. Jalpaiguri, 4. Darjeeling, 5. Raiganj, 6. Balurghat, 7. Maldaha Uttar, 8. Maldaha Dakshin, 9. Jangipur, 10. Baharampur, 11. Murshidabad, 12. Krishnanagar, 13. Ranaghat, 14. Bangaon, 15. Barrackpore, 16. Dum Dum, 17. Barasat, 18. Basirhat, 19. Jaynagar, 20. Mathurapur, 21. Diamond Harbour, 22. Jadavpur, 23. Kolkata Dakshin, 24. Kolkata Uttar, 25. Howrah, 26. Uluberia, 27. Serampore, 28. Hooghly, 29. Arambagh, 30. Tamluk, 31, Kanthi, 32. Ghatal, 33. Jhargram, 34. Medinipur, 35. Purulia, 36. Bankura, 37. Bishnupur, 38. Bardhaman Purba, 39. Bardhaman Durgapur, 40. Asansol, 41. Bolpur, 42. Birbhum

As per order of the Delimitation Commission in respect of the delimitation of constituencies in the West Bengal, parliamentary constituency no. 1 Coochbehar, reserved for Scheduled castes (SC), is composed of the following segments from 2009:

#	Name	District	MLA, from 2026	MLA's Party	2024 Lok Sabha Lead
2	Mathabhanga (SC)	Cooch Behar	Nisith Pramanik	BJP	BJP
3	Cooch Behar Uttar (SC)	Cooch Behar	Sukumar Roy	BJP	BJP
4	Cooch Behar Dakshin	Cooch Behar	Rathindra Bose	BJP	AITC
5	Sitalkuchi (SC)	Cooch Behar	Sabitri Barman	BJP	AITC
6	Sitai (SC)	Cooch Behar	Sangita Roy	AITC	AITC
7	Dinhata	Cooch Behar	Ajay Ray	BJP	AITC
8	Natabari	Cooch Behar	Girija Shankar Ray	BJP	BJP

The area under the Mathabhanga subdivision of the Cooch Behar district will constitute the assembly constituencies of Mathabhanga and Sitalkuchi, whereas the area under the Dinhata subdivision will form the constituencies of Dinahata and Sitai. The area under Cooch Behar Sadar subdivision will form Cooch Behar Uttar, Cooch Behar Dakshin and Natabari constituencies, though Natabari will contain gram panchayats from Tufanganj subdivision also.

== Members of Parliament ==
Year	Member	Party
1951	Upendra Nath Barman	Indian National Congress
1951	Birendra Nath Katham	Indian National Congress
1951	Amiya Kanta Basu	Indian National Congress
1957	Upendra Nath Barman	Indian National Congress
1957	Santosh Banerjee	Indian National Congress
1962	Debendra Nath Karjee	All India Forward Bloc
1963^	P. C. Barman	Indian National Congress
1967	Benoy Krishna Daschowdhury	All India Forward Bloc
1971	Benoy Krishna Daschowdhury	Indian National Congress
1977	Amar Roy Pradhan	All India Forward Bloc
1980	Amar Roy Pradhan	All India Forward Bloc
1984	Amar Roy Pradhan	All India Forward Bloc
1989	Amar Roy Pradhan	All India Forward Bloc
1991	Amar Roy Pradhan	All India Forward Bloc
1996	Amar Roy Pradhan	All India Forward Bloc
1998	Amar Roy Pradhan	All India Forward Bloc
1999	Amar Roy Pradhan	All India Forward Bloc
2004	Hiten Barman	All India Forward Bloc
2009	Nripendra Nath Roy	All India Forward Bloc
2014	Renuka Sinha	Trinamool Congress
2016^	Partha Pratim Roy	Trinamool Congress
2019	Nisith Pramanik	Bharatiya Janata Party
2024	Jagadish Chandra Barma Basunia	Trinamool Congress
2026 (Note: Switched to NCPI as part of AITC Rebels in Lok Sabha.)	Jagadish Chandra Barma Basunia	Nationalist Citizens Party of India

^ denotes by-polls

== Election results ==
=== 2024 ===
2024 Indian general elections: Cooch Behar
Party	Candidate	Votes	%	±%
AITC	Jagadish Chandra Barma Basunia	788,375	48.57	▲4.24
BJP	Nisith Pramanik	749,125	46.16	▲2.39
AIFB	Nitish Chandra Roy	30,267	1.86	▼1.21
INC	Piya Roy Chowdhury	10,679	0.66	▼1.19
Independent	Harekrishna Sarkar	9,467	0.58	New
Independent	Kamalesh Barman	2,993	0.18	New
Independent	Nabi Barman	2,724	0.17	New
Independent	Subodh Barman	2599	0.16	New
SUCI(C)	Dilip Chandra Barman	2468	0.15	New
BSP	Purna Mohan Roy	2097	0.13	New
Independent	Bidhan Das	2072	0.13	New
Independent	Kishore Ray	1606	0.1	New
Kamtapur People's Party	Pradip Kumar Roy	1,518	0.09	New
Independent	Amal Das	1495	0.09	New
NOTA	None of the above	15,563	0.96	▲0.1
Majority		39,250	2.41	▼3.53
Turnout		16,23,048	82.16	▼1.92
AITC gain from BJP		Swing		

=== 2019 ===
2019 Indian general elections: Cooch Behar
Party	Candidate	Votes	%	±%
BJP	Nisith Pramanik	731,594	47.98	▲31.64
AITC	Paresh Chandra Adhikary	677,363	44.43	▲4.92
AIFB	Gobinda Chandra Roy	46,648	3.07	▼29.91
INC	Piya Roy Chowdhury	28,215	1.85	▼2.52
NOTA	None of the above	14,490	0.95	
Majority		54,231	3.55	
Turnout		1,525,446	84.08	▲1.27
BJP gain from AITC		Swing	▲13.36	

=== 2016 by-election ===
Bye-election, 2016 : Cooch Behar
Party	Candidate	Votes	%	±%
AITC	Partha Pratim Roy	794,375	59.03	+19.52
BJP	Hem Chandra Barman	3,81,134	28.32	+11.98
AIFB	Nripendra Nath Roy	87,363	6.49	−26.49
INC	Partha Pratim Isore	33,470	2.49	−3.10
NOTA	None of the above	9,680	0.72	−0.14
Majority		4,13,241	30.71	+24.18
Turnout		13,45,717	78.39	−4.42
AITC hold		Swing		

=== 2014 result ===
2014 Indian general elections: Cooch Behar
Party	Candidate	Votes	%	±%
AITC	Renuka Sinha	526,499	39.51	−2.14
AIFB	Dipak Kumar Roy	4,39,393	32.98	−11.68
BJP	Hem Chandra Barman	2,17,653	16.34	+10.51
INC	Keshab Chandra Ray	74,540	5.59	N/A
BSP	Girindra Nath Barman	15,683	1.18	−0.86
Independent	Bangshi Badan Barman	13,205	0.99	−2.33
NOTA	None of the above	11,409	0.86	N/A
Majority		87,107	6.53	+3.52
Turnout		13,32,409	82.81	−1.54
AITC gain from AIFB		Swing		

=== General election 2009 ===
2009 Indian general elections: Cooch Behar
Party	Candidate	Votes	%	±%
AIFB	Nripendra Nath Roy	5,08,677	44.66	
AITC	Arghya Roy Pradhan	4,66,928	41.65	
BJP	Bhabendra Nath Barman	65,325	5.83	
Independent	Bangshi Badan Barman	37,226	3.32	
BSP	Niranjan Barman	22,925	2.04	
Independent	Hitendra Das	11,374	1.01	
Majority		41,749	3.01	
Turnout		11,21,043	84.35	
AIFB hold		Swing		

=== General election 2004 ===
General Election, 2004: Cooch Behar
Party	Candidate	Votes	%	±%
AIFB	Hiten Barman	490,982	51.90	
AITC	Girindra Nath Barman	264,413	27.90	
INC	Sailen Barma	116,715	12.30	
Forward Bloc (Socialist)	Amar Roy Pradhan	26,755	2.80	
NCP	Bharat Singha Sarkar	17,393	1.80	
Independent	Pradip Kumar Roy	11,021	1.20	
Independent	Nripen Karjee	10,682	1.10	
AMB	Dalendra Roy	8,527	0.90	
Samajwadi Party	Piyush Barman	6,075	0.60	
Majority		226,569	23.90%	
Turnout		9,47,381	82.5%	
AIFB hold		Swing		

=== General election 1999 ===
General Election, 1999: Cooch Behar
Party	Candidate	Votes	%	±%
AIFB	Amar Roy Pradhan	443,148	49.70	
AITC	Ambika Charan Ray	334,983	37.60	
INC	Sabita Roy	90,378	10.10	
BSP	Papiya Barman	17,188	1.90	
Independent (politician) (KPP)	Mahendra Nath Das	2,766	0.30	
Independent	Nripen Karjee	2,385	0.30	
NCP	Usha Roy	981	0.10	
Majority		108,165	(12.0%)	
Turnout		9,02,487	(80.8%)	
AIFB hold		Swing		

=== General election 1998 ===
General Election, 1998: Cooch Behar
Party	Candidate	Votes	%	±%
AIFB	Amar Roy Pradhan	396,140	43.20	
Forward Bloc (Socialist)	Gobinda Ray	272,974	29.80	
AITC	Prasenjit Barman	218,093	10.10	
BSP	Papiya Barman	13,480	1.50	
AMB	Karneswar Barman	2,766	0.30	
Majority		123,166	13.4	
Turnout		9,16,783	83.6%	
AIFB hold		Swing		

=== General elections 1957-2004 ===
In 1951, Upendra Nath Barman, Birendra Nath Katham and Amiya Kanta Basu, all of Congress, won the North Bengal seat. The winners and runners-up from Cooch Behar for subsequent elections are shown below. In (by-election)1958, Nalini Ranjan Ghosh of Indian National Congress won.

Year	Winner		Runner-up		Ref.
Year	Candidate	Party	Candidate	Party	Ref.
1957	Santosh Banerjee	Indian National Congress	Shibendra Kumar Bhattacharya	All India Forward Bloc	
1957	Upendranath Barman	Indian National Congress	Shibendra Kumar Bhattacharya	All India Forward Bloc	
1962	Debendranath Karjee	All India Forward Bloc	Upendra Nath Barman	Indian National Congress	
1967	BKD Chowdhury	All India Forward Bloc	PC Barman	Indian National Congress	
1972	Benoy Krishna Das Chowdhury	Indian National Congress	Nagendra Nath Roy	Communist Party of India	
1977	Amar Roy Pradhan	All India Forward Bloc	Benoy Krishna Daschowdhury	Indian National Congress	
1980	Amar Roy Pradhan	All India Forward Bloc	Ambika Charan Roy	Indian National Congress	
1984	Amar Roy Pradhan	All India Forward Bloc	Prasenjit Barman	Indian National Congress	
1989	Amar Roy Pradhan	All India Forward Bloc	Sabita Roy	Indian National Congress	
1991	Amar Roy Pradhan	All India Forward Bloc	Sabita Roy	Indian National Congress	
1996	Amar Roy Pradhan	All India Forward Bloc	Sabita Roy	Indian National Congress	
1998	Amar Roy Pradhan	All India Forward Bloc	Gobinda Roy	Forward Bloc	
1999	Amar Roy Pradhan	All India Forward Bloc	Ambika Charan Ray	All India Trinamool Congress	
2004	Hiten Barman	All India Forward Bloc	Girindra Nath Barman	All India Trinamool Congress	
2009	Nripendra Nath Roy	All India Forward Bloc	Arghya Roy Pradhan	All India Trinamool Congress	
2014	Renuka Sinha	All India Trinamool Congress	Dipak Kumar Roy	All India Forward Bloc	
2016 (By Poll)	Partha Pratim Roy	All India Trinamool Congress	Hem Chandra Barman	Bharatiya Janata Party	
2019	Nisith Pramanik	Bharatiya Janata Party	Paresh Chandra Adhikari	All India Trinamool Congress	

== See also ==
- List of constituencies of the Lok Sabha
