= Jagadish Chandra Barma Basunia =

Indian politician

Member of Parliament, Lok Sabha
- Incumbent
- Assumed office 4 June 2024
- Preceded by: Nisith Pramanik
- Constituency: Cooch Behar

Member of West Bengal Legislative Assembly
- In office 19 May 2016 – 4 June 2024
- Preceded by: Keshab Chandra Roy
- Succeeded by: Sangita Roy
- Constituency: Sitai

Personal details
- Born: 14 January 1964 (age 62)
- Party: Nationalist Citizens Party of India (2026–present)
- Other political affiliations: Trinamool Congress (till 2026)
- Education: University of North Bengal
- Profession: Politician

Jagadish Chandra Barma Basunia (born 14 January 1964) is an Indian politician from West Bengal. In May 2021, he was elected as the member of the West Bengal Legislative Assembly from Sitai. He is currently serving as the Member of Parliament from Cooch Behar.

== Career ==
Barma Basunia is from Sitai, Cooch Behar district. His father's name is Kalipada Barma Basunia. He passed BA from North Bengal University in 1983 and B.P.Ed. from Amaravati University in 1988. He was elected as Pradhan from All India Forward Bloc. He joined AITC in 2011. He was elected as the President of Sitai Panchayat Samiti in 2013. He contested 2016 West Bengal Legislative Assembly election from Sitai Vidhan Sabha and won the seat on 2 May 2021.

== Political career ==
He contested the 2024 Lok Sabha election from the Trinamool Congress from Cooch Behar Lok Sabha constituency and won to became first time Member of Parliament.

=== 2026 Rebellion ===
In June 2026, almost immediately after the massive Trinamool Congress defeat, around 20 MPs of TMC allegedly declared rebellion from their Party, and presented their written wish to join Bhartiya Janata Party. This group was led by Kakoli Ghosh.

Later, on 14 June, 20 MPs, including Basunia, signed a formal letter declaring their split from Trinamool Congress as to merge with the Nationalist Citizen Party of India (NCPI). They formally submitted the letter to Lok Sabha Speaker Om Birla.

The total strength of TMC in Lok Sabha had been 28, so that a number of 20 MPS made it eligible for splitting from the Party, as per the Indian Defection laws, so as to escape the anti-defection disqualification.
