= Baren Chandra Barman =

Indian politician

Member of the West Bengal Legislative Assembly
- In office 2 May 2021 – 3 May 2026
- Preceded by: Hiten Barman
- Succeeded by: Sabitri Barman
- Constituency: Sitalkuchi

Personal details
- Born: 15 February 1974 (age 52) Sitalkuchi, West Bengal
- Party: Bharatiya Janata Party
- Education: Burdwan University
- Profession: Politician

Baren Chandra Barman is an Indian politician from BJP. In May 2021, he was elected as the member of the West Bengal Legislative Assembly from Sitalkuchi.

== Career ==
Barman is from Sitalkuchi, Cooch Behar district. His father's name is Anil Chandra Barman. His son's name is Bikram Barman. He earned a Master of Arts degree from Burdwan University in 2006. He contested in 2021 West Bengal Legislative Assembly election from Sitalkuchi Vidhan Sabha and won the seat on 2 May 2021.
