= Upendranath Barman =

Indian politician (1899–1988)

Member of Parliament, Lok Sabha
- In office 1952–1962
- Succeeded by: Debendra Nath Karjee
- Constituency: Cooch Behar, West Bengal

Personal details
- Born: 1 December 1899 Gopalpur, Cooch Behar State, Bengal Presidency, British India
- Died: 7 February 1988 (aged 88) Jalpaiguri, West Bengal, India
- Party: Indian National Congress
- Spouse: Kshirodebala Debi (m. 1926)
- Children: 6

Upendranath Barman (1 December 1899 – 7 February 1988) was an Indian politician. He was elected from Cooch Behar, West Bengal to the Lok Sabha, lower house of the Parliament of India as a member of the Indian National Congress.

== Personal life ==
Barman belonged to a Rajbanshi family. He was born in Cooch Behar to father Biranarayan Barman. He graduated from Victoria College in Cooch Behar and earned his LLB degree from University Law College, Calcutta. He practiced law for a few years in Jalpaiguri. He married Kshirodebala Debi in 1926 and had two sons and four daughters. He died in 1988.

== Political career ==
Barman was a part of the Indian National Congress and was elected to the Bengal Legislative Assembly from 1937 to 1945. He also served as a minister in the state between 1941 and 1943. In the first general elections in 1952, he contested from the North Bengal Lok Sabha seat and won. He again fought the Lok Sabha polls from Cooch Behar constituency in 1957 and won.

=== Ideology ===
Barman was vocal about the rights of the backward castes. Reservation for the Scheduled Castes, then known as ‘Depressed Class’, was incorporated in the Government of India Act, 1935 which was passed by the British Parliament but Barman believed the condition of the backward castes had not improved. According to him, only a privileged few, who got the opportunity to get education, were in better condition.

== Literary career ==
Barman authored History of Rajbanshi Community and History of Rajbanshi Literature.
