= Sitalkuchi Assembly constituency =

Sitalkuchi
- Constituency No. 5 for the West Bengal Legislative Assembly
- Interactive Map Outlining Sitalkuchi (SC) Assembly Constituency

Constituency details
- Country: India
- Region: East India
- State: West Bengal
- District: Cooch Behar
- Lok Sabha constituency: Cooch Behar (SC)
- Established: 1962
- Total electors: 285,874
- Reservation: SC

Member of Legislative Assembly
- 18th West Bengal Legislative Assembly
- Incumbent Sabitri Barman
- Party: Bharatiya Janata Party
- Elected year: 2026
- Preceded by: Baren Chandra Barman

Most Successful parties from Sitalkuchi (SC) assembly
1. Communist Party of India (Marxist) (7 times) (58.3%)
2. All India Trinamool Congress (2 times) (16.7%)
3. Bharatiya Janata Party (2 times) (16.7%)
4. All India Forward Block (1 time) (8.33%)

Sitalkuchi is an assembly constituency in Cooch Behar district in the Indian state of West Bengal. It is reserved for scheduled castes.

== Overview ==
As per orders of the Delimitation Commission, No. 5 Sitalkuchi Assembly constituency (SC) covers Sitalkuchi community development block and Bairagirhat, Gopalpur, Jorpatiki, Kedarhat, Kursamari, Nayarhat and Shikarpur gram panchayats of Mathabhanga I community development block.

Sitalkuchi Assembly constituency is part of No. 1 Cooch Behar (Lok Sabha constituency) (SC).

== Members of the Legislative Assembly ==
Year	Name	Party
Before 1962 - Constituency did not exist
1962	Bejoy Kumar Roy	All India Forward Bloc
1967–1977 - Constituency did not exist
1977	Sudhir Pramanik	Communist Party of India (Marxist)
1982	Sudhir Pramanik	Communist Party of India (Marxist)
1987	Sudhir Pramanik	Communist Party of India (Marxist)
1991	Sudhir Pramanik	Communist Party of India (Marxist)
1996	Sudhir Pramanik	Communist Party of India (Marxist)
2001	Sudhir Pramanik	Communist Party of India (Marxist)
2006	Harish Chandra Barman	Communist Party of India (Marxist)
2011	Hiten Barman	All India Trinamool Congress
2016	Hiten Barman	All India Trinamool Congress
2021	Baren Chandra Barman	Bharatiya Janata Party
2026	Sabitri Barman	Bharatiya Janata Party

== Election results ==
=== 2026 ===
In the 2026 West Bengal Legislative Assembly election, Sabitri Barman of BJP defeated her nearest rival Harihas Das of TMC by 25,278 votes.

2026 West Bengal Legislative Assembly election: Sitalkuchi (SC)
Party	Candidate	Votes	%	±%
BJP	Sabitri Barman	144,367	51.59	▲0.79
AITC	Harihar Das	119,089	42.56	▼1
CPI(M)	Namadipti Roy Adhikary	3,979	1.42	▼1.31
INC	Sukamal Barman	2,522	0.9	New entry
IND	Paresh Chandra Manta	1,684	0.6	New entry
KPP(U)	Manik Chandra Barman	1,506	0.54	▲0.14
AMB	Kamal Barman	1,352	0.48	▼0.19
IND	Gajendra Barman	1,199	0.43	New entry
BSP	Shyamsundar Ray	945	0.34	New entry
SUCI(C)	Jagadish Adhikari	773	0.28	Steady
IND	Harekrishna Sarkar	752	0.27	▼0.55
NOTA	Nota	1,654	0.59	▼0.53
Majority		25,278	9.03	▲1.79
Turnout		279,822	97.88	▲11.65
Registered electors		285,874		▲0.21
BJP hold		Swing	0.89	

=== 2021 ===
In the 2021 elections Baren Chandra Barman of Bharatiya Janata Party won defeating his nearest rival Partha Pratim R0y of All India Trinamool Congress

2021 West Bengal Legislative Assembly election: Sitalkuchi
Party	Candidate	Votes	%	±%
BJP	Baren Chandra Barman	124,955	50.8	▲35.06
AITC	Partha Pratim Ray	107,140	43.56	
CPI(M)	Sudhangshu Pramanik	6,720	2.73	▼33.59
NOTA	None of the above	2,743	1.12	
Majority		17,815	7.24	
Turnout		245,966	86.23	
BJP gain from AITC		Swing		

=== 2016 ===
In the 2016 election, Hiten Barman of Trinamool Congress defeated his nearest rival Namadipti Adhikary of CPI(M).

West Bengal assembly elections, 2016: Sitalkuchi (SC) constituency
Party	Candidate	Votes	%	±%
AITC	Hiten Barman	1,01,647	42.71	▼1.51
CPI(M)	Namadipti Adhikari	86,164	36.32	▼7.76
BJP	Baren Chandra Barman	37,347	15.74	▲11.13
Kamtapur People's Party (United)	Premamamda Barman	4,953	2.08	
SUCI(C)	Jagadish Adhikari	2,267	0.95	
BSP	Girindranath Barman	2,235	0.93	
AMB	Subodh Barman	1,838	0.77	
Independent	Fulkumar Barman	1,520	0.63	
Majority		15,483	6.39	▲6.25
Turnout		237,971		
AITC hold		Swing		

=== 2011 ===
In the 2011 election, Hiten Barman of Trinamool Congress defeated his nearest rival Biswanath Pramanik of CPI(M).

West Bengal assembly elections, 2011: Sitalkuchi (SC) constituency
Party	Candidate	Votes	%	±%
AITC	Hiten Barman	84,651	44.22	+4.73
CPI(M)	Biswanath Pramanik	84,394	44.08	−8.66
BJP	Bhabendra Nath Barman	8,829	4.61	
JMM	Subal Barman	6,000	3.13	
Independent	Dwijendra Nath Barman	3,547		
BSP	Gautam Barman	2,369		
AMB	Subodh Barman	1,663		
Majority		257	0.14	
Turnout		191,453	88.45	
AITC gain from CPI(M)		Swing	+13.39	

=== 2006 ===
In the 2006 state assembly elections, Harish Chandra Barman of CPI(M) won the Sitalkuchi seat defeating his nearest rival Lalit Chandra Pramanik of Trinamool Congress. Contests in most years were multi cornered but only winners and runners are being mentioned. Sudhir Pramanik of CPI(M) defeated Birendra Narayan Barma of Congress in 2001 and 1996, Ambika Charan Ray of Congress in 1991, Sabita Roy of Congress in 1987, and Birendranath Roy of Congress in 1982 and 1977.

=== Earlier ===
Bejoy Kumar Roy of Forward Bloc won the Sitalkuchi seat in 1962.
