= Hiten Barman =

Indian politician

Member of Parliament, Lok Sabha
- In office 2004-2009
- Preceded by: Amar Roy Pradhan
- Succeeded by: Nripendra Nath Roy
- Constituency: Cooch Behar

Member of Legislative Assembly
- In office 2011–2021
- Succeeded by: Baren Chandra Barman
- Constituency: Sitalkuchi

Forest Minister
- In office 2011-2013

Personal details
- Born: 21 June 1950 (age 75) Gopalpur, District: Cooch Behar
- Party: All India Trinamool Congress (2009 – present) All India Forward Bloc (1972-2009)
- Spouse: Kalpana Barman
- Children: Two sons (Tapan Barman and Piyush Barman)

Hiten Barman is an Indian politician, who was earlier with All India Forward Bloc and later joined All India Trinamool Congress in the Indian state West Bengal.

== Early life ==
Hiten Barman, son of Maneswar and Rajabala Barman, was born on 21 June 1950 at Gopalpur in Cooch Behar district.

Educated at Mathabhanga High School, he passed Higher Secondary and Junior Basic Training, and became a teacher.

He married Kalpana in 1983 and they have two sons.

== Political career ==
He entered politics at a young age in 1972, when he was studying at Ananda Chandra College in Jalpaiguri. Initially involved in student politics, he subsequently joined the Forward Bloc. Hailing from a peasant family he emerged as the saha-sabhapati of Mathabhanga Panchayat Samiti. In the 1996 Lok Sabha election, he contested as a candidate of the Forward Bloc (Socialist) led by Kamal Guha. He faced defeat then but was elected to the Lok Sabha in 2004 from the Cooch Behar seat as a Forward Bloc candidate.

In 2009, the Forward Bloc refused to renominate their sitting MP. This aggrieved him and he left the party and later joined the Trinamool Congress. In 2011, he was elected to the state assembly on a Trinamool Congress ticket from the Sitalkuchi (Vidhan Sabha constituency). He was made the Forest Minister in 2011 but was dropped in a reshuffle in 2013.
