= Cooch Behar district =

District in West Bengal, India

- District of West Bengal
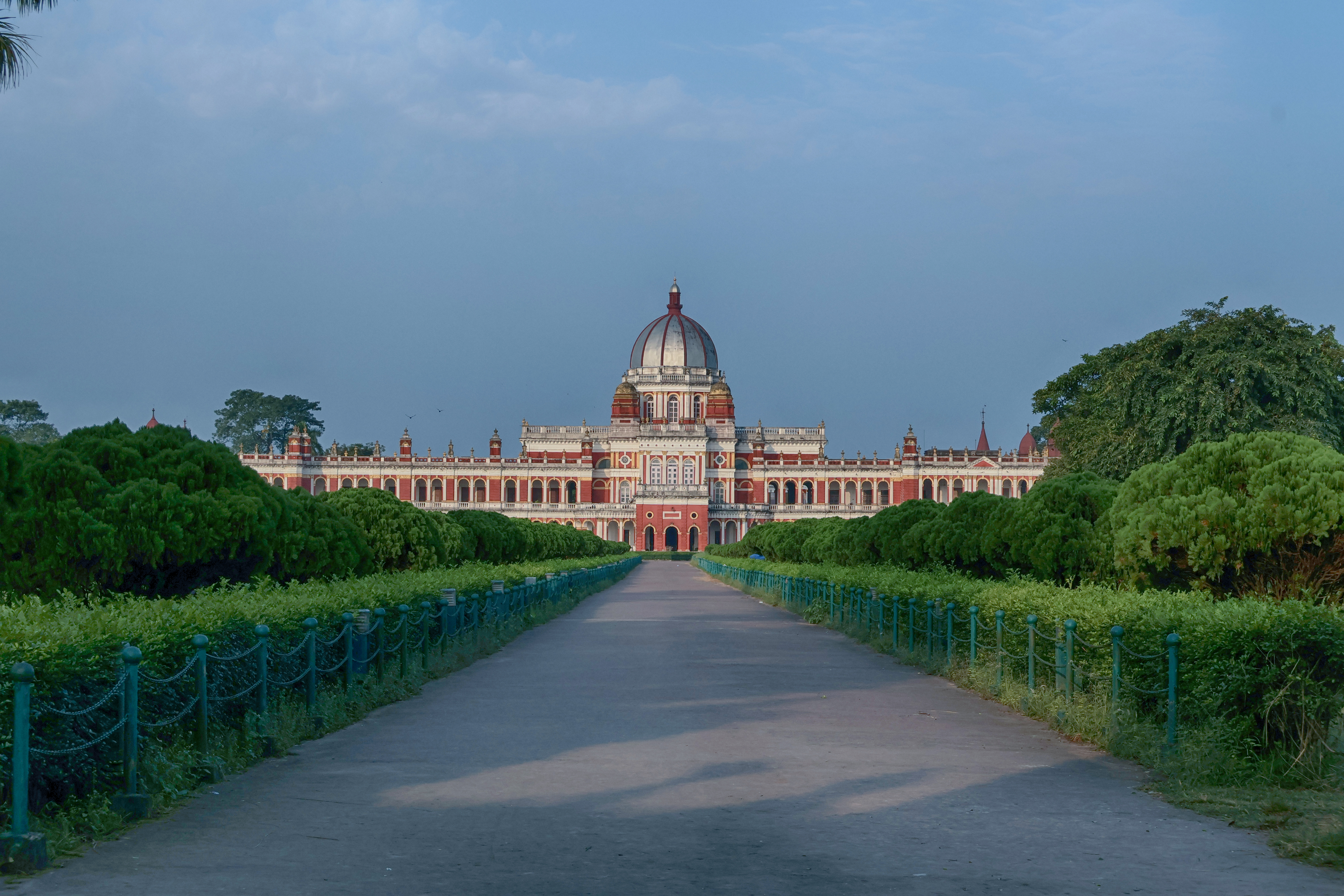
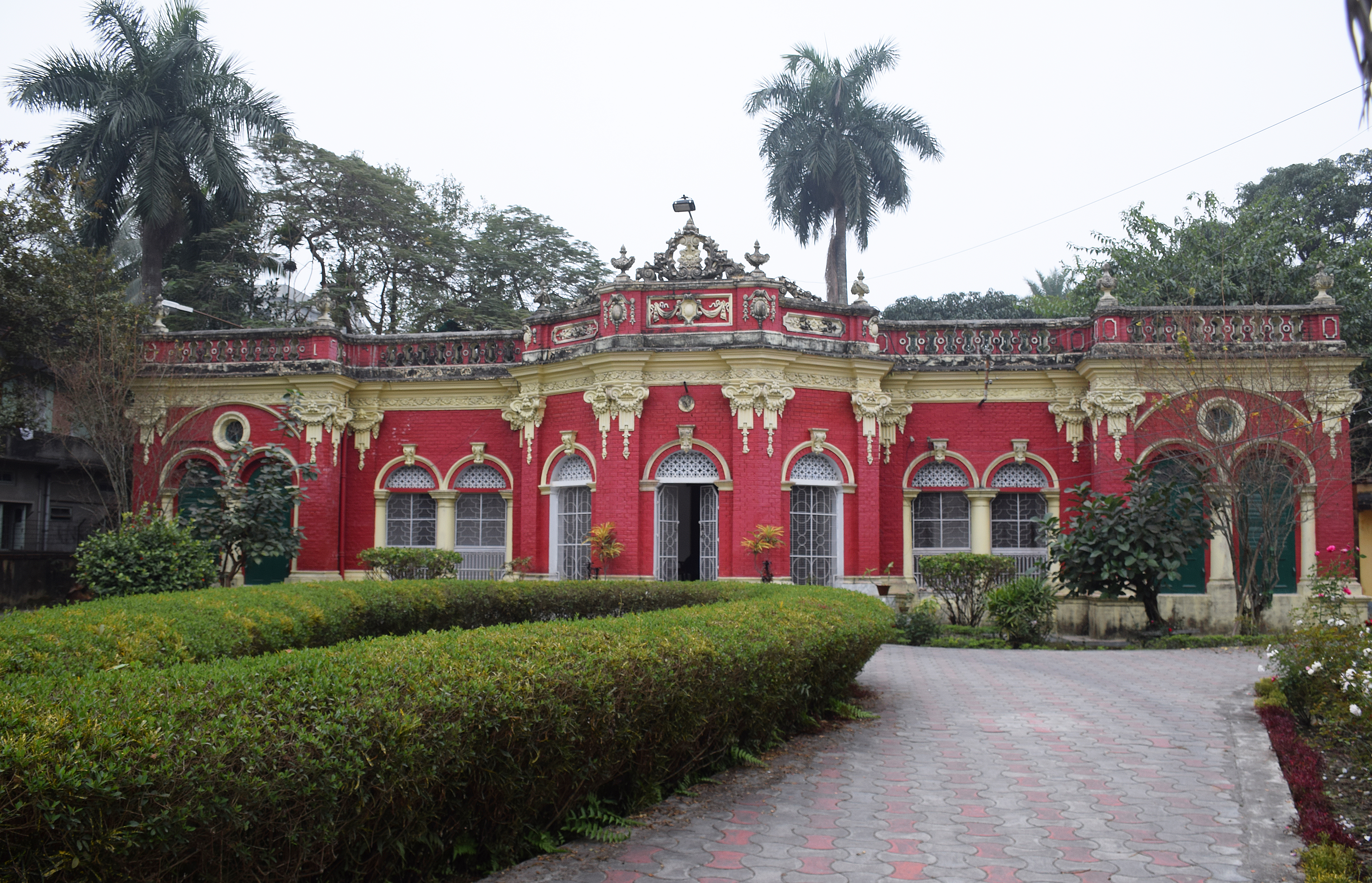
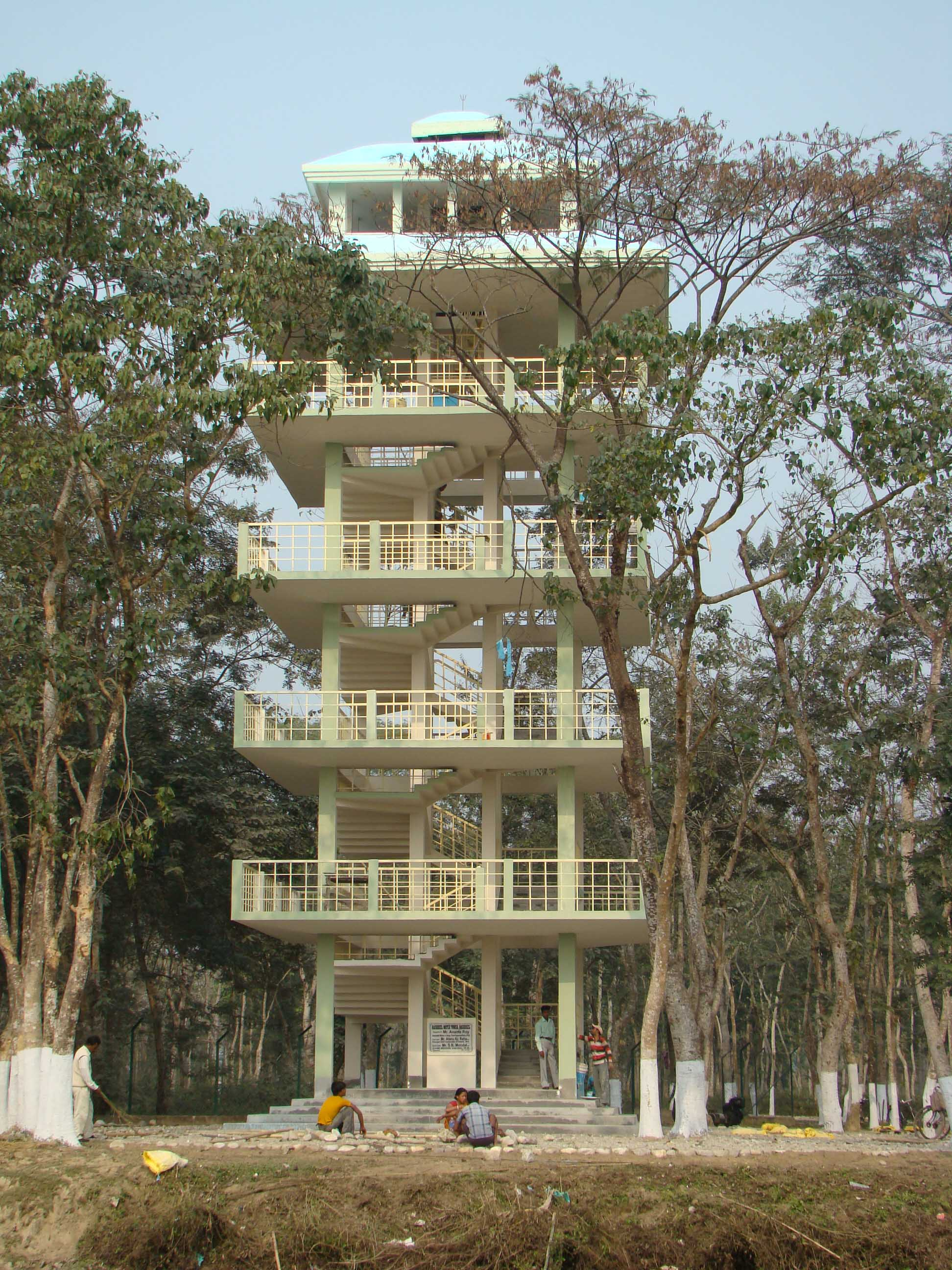
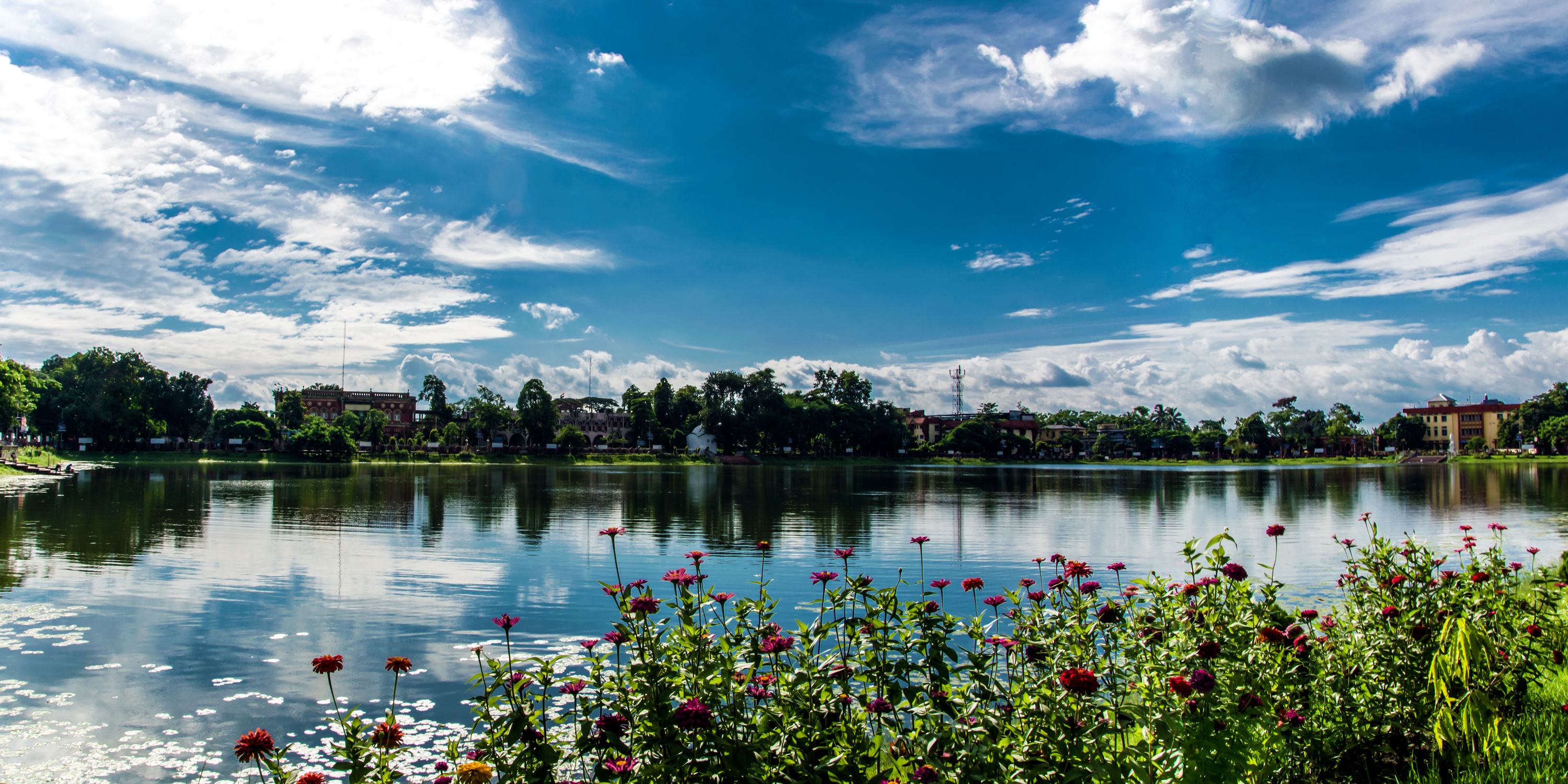
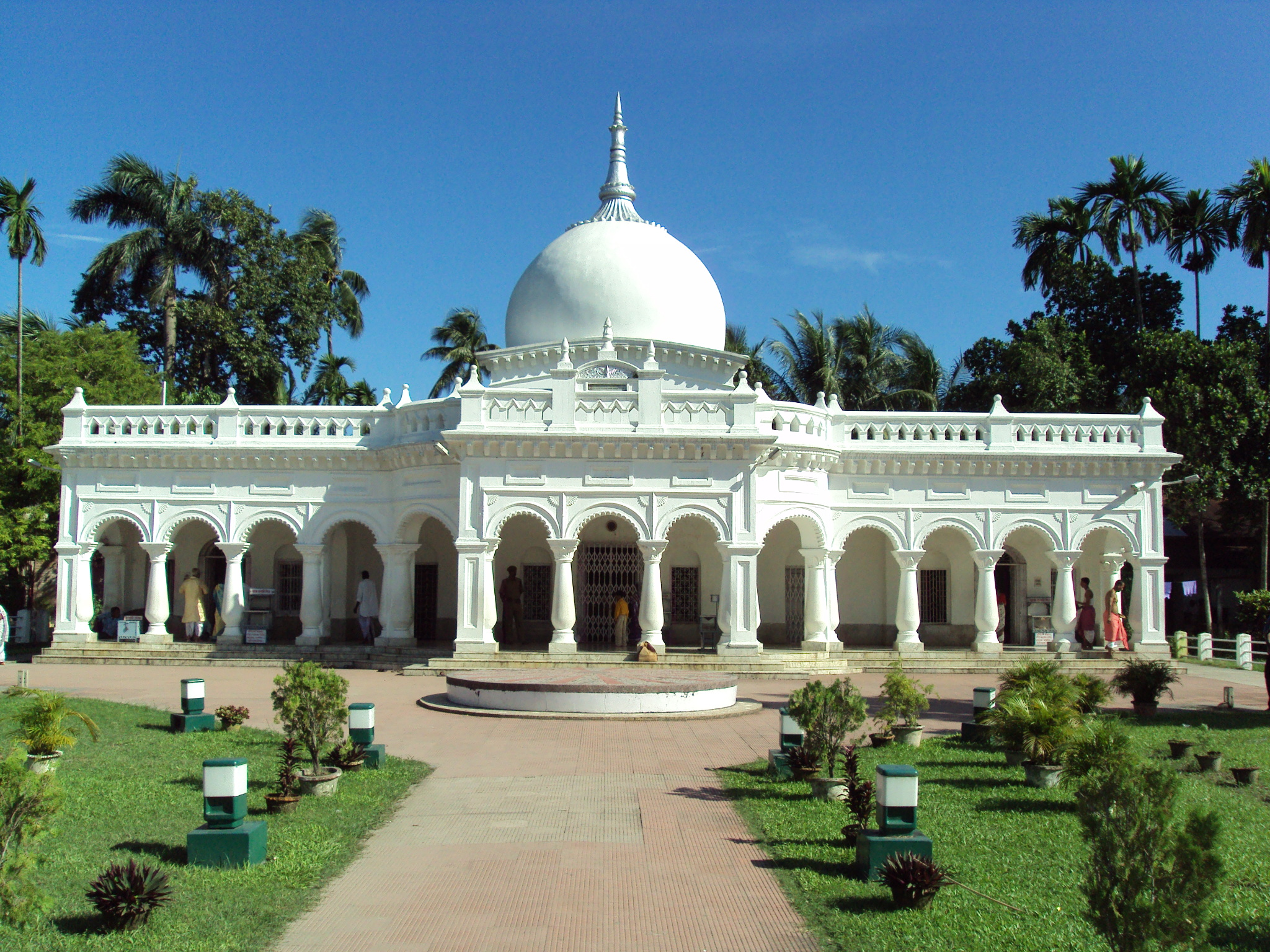
- Cooch Behar Palace Parijat Villa Rasikbil Sagar Dighi Lake Madan Mohan Temple

- Location of Cooch Behar district in West Bengal
- Coordinates: 26°17′N 89°21′E
- Country: India
- State: West Bengal
- Division: Jalpaiguri
- Headquarters: Cooch Behar

Government
  - Subdivisions: Cooch Behar Sadar, Dinhata, Mathabhanga, Tufanganj, Mekhliganj
  - CD Blocks: Cooch Behar I, Cooch Behar II, Dinhata I, Dinhata II, Sitai, Mathabhanga I, Mathabhanga II, Sitalkuchi, Tufanganj I, Tufanganj II, Mekhliganj, Haldibari
  - Lok Sabha constituencies: Cooch Behar
  - Vidhan Sabha constituencies: Mathabhanga, Cooch Behar Uttar, Cooch Behar Dakshin, Sitalkuchi, Sitai, Dinhata, Natabari, Tufanganj

Area
  - Total: 3,387 km^{2} (1,308 sq mi)

Population (2011)
  - Total: 2,819,086
  - Density: 832.3/km^{2} (2,156/sq mi)

Demographics
  - Literacy: 74.78 per cent
  - Sex ratio: 942 ♂/♀

Languages
  - Official: Bengali
  - Additional official: English
- Time zone: UTC+05:30 (IST)
- Website: coochbehar.gov.in

Cooch Behar district (Bengali pronunciation: [kot͡ʃ biɦar d͡ʒela]), also known as Koch Bihar district, is one of the 23 districts of the state of West Bengal in India. The district is a part of the Jalpaiguri Division. Cooch Behar city serves as the headquarters of the district. This district was a Princely state until 1949 CE. The district consists of the flat plains of North Bengal and has several rivers: the most notable being the Teesta, Jaldhaka and Torsa. The district has the highest proportion of Scheduled Castes in the country.

== Etymology ==
The name Cooch Behar is derived from two words—Cooch, a corrupted form of the word Koch, the name of the Koch tribes, and the word behar is derived from vihara meaning land, Koch Behar means land of the Koches.

== History ==
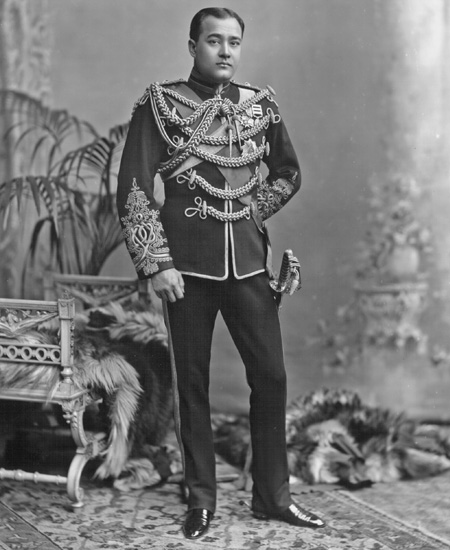
Maharaja Nripendra Narayan of Cooch Bihar

=== Early period ===
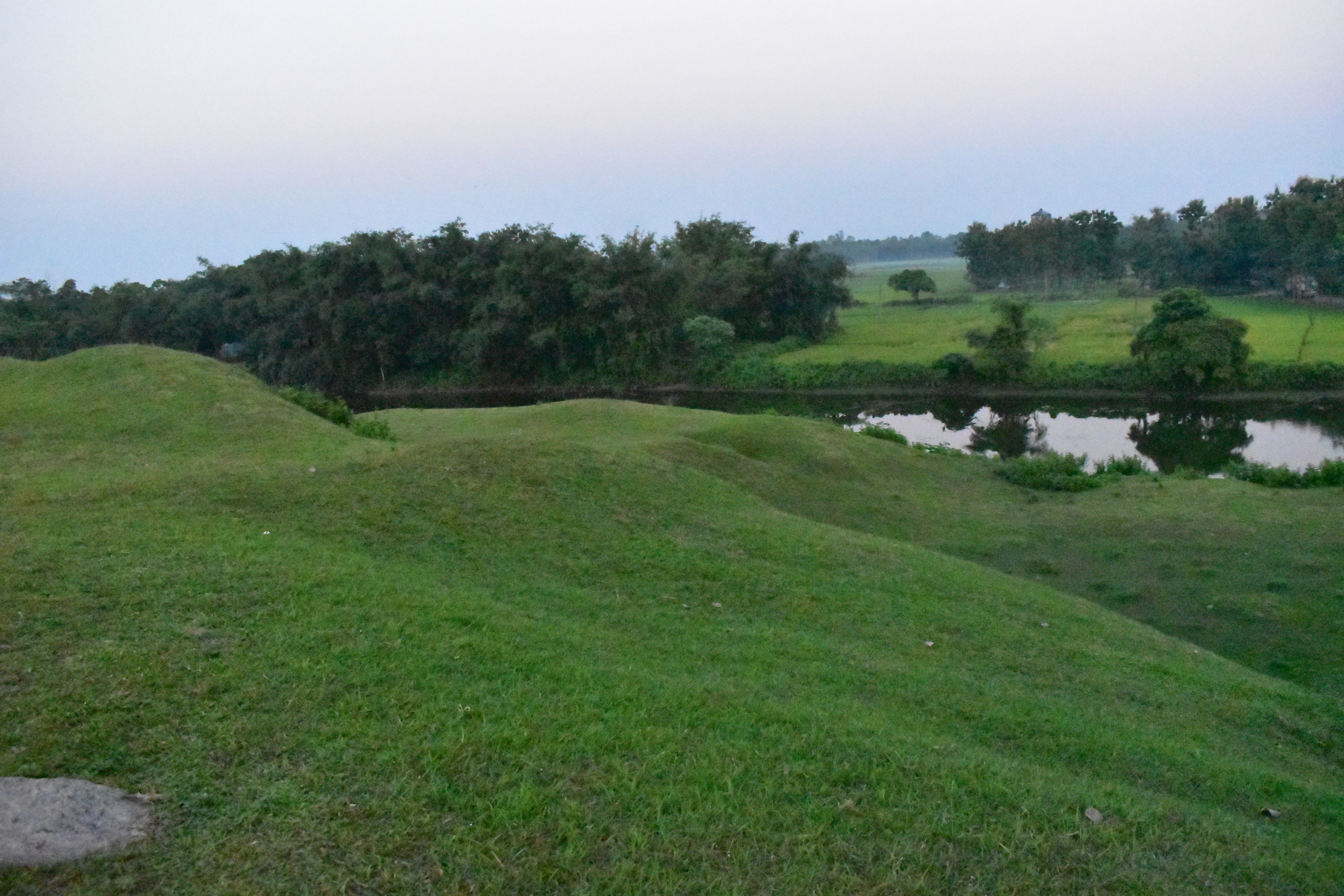
Gosanimari archaeological site former capital of Kamata kingdom

Cooch Behar formed part of the Kamarupa Kingdom of Assam from the 4th to the 12th centuries. In the 12th century, the area became a part of the Kamata Kingdom, first ruled by the Khen dynasty from their capital at Kamatapur. The Khens were an indigenous tribe, and they ruled till about 1498 CE, when they fell to Alauddin Hussain Shah, the independent Pathan Sultan of Gour. The new invaders fought with the local Bhuyan chieftains and the Ahom king Suhungmung and lost control of the region. During this time, the Koch tribe became very powerful and proclaimed itself Kamateshwar (Lord of Kamata) and established the Koch dynasty.

The first important Koch ruler was Biswa Singha, who came to power in 1515. Under his son, Nara Narayan, the Kamata Kingdom reached its zenith. Nara Narayan's younger brother, Shukladhwaj (Chilarai), was a noted military general who undertook expeditions to expand the kingdom. He became governor of its eastern portion.

After Chilarai's death, his son Raghudev became governor of this portion. Since Nara Narayan did not have a son, Raghudev was seen as the heir apparent. However, a late child of Nara Narayan removed Raghudev's claim to the throne. To placate him, Nara Narayan had to anoint Raghudev as a vassal chief of the portion of the kingdom east of the Sankosh River. This area came to be known as Koch Hajo. After the death of Nara Narayan in 1584, Raghudev declared independence. The kingdom ruled by the son of Nara Narayan, Lakshmi Narayan, came to be known as Cooch Behar. The division of the Kamata Kingdom into Koch Behar and Koch Hajo was permanent. Koch Behar aligned itself with the Mughal Empire and finally joined the India as a part of the West Bengal, whereas remnants of the Koch Hajo rulers aligned themselves with the Ahom kingdom and the region became a part of Assam.

As the early capital of the Koch Kingdom, Cooch Behar's location was not static and became stable only when shifted to Cooch Behar town. Maharaja Rup Narayan, on the advice of an unknown saint, transferred the capital from Attharokotha to Guriahati (now called Cooch Behar town) on the banks of the Torsa River between 1693 and 1714. The capital has always been in or near its present location since then.

In 1661 CE, Maharaja Pran Narayan planned to expand his kingdom. However, Mir Jumla, the subedar of Bengal under the Mughal emperor Aurangazeb, attacked Cooch Behar and conquered the territory, meeting almost no resistance. The town of Cooch Behar was subsequently named Alamgirnagar. Maharaja Pran Narayan regained his kingdom within a few days.

=== British Raj ===
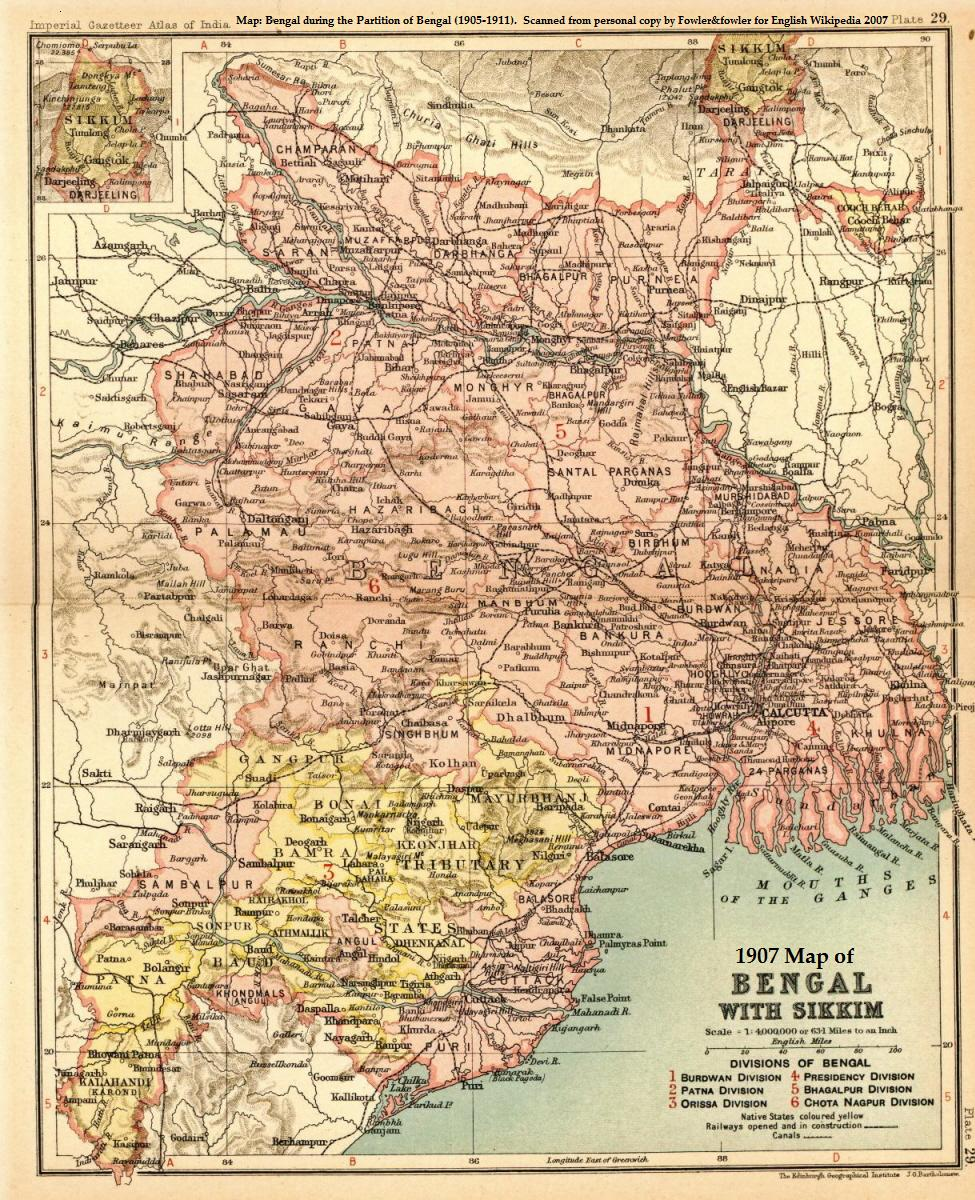
1907 Map of Bengal with Sikkim

In 1772–1773, the king of Bhutan attacked and captured Cooch Behar. To expel the Bhutanese, the kingdom of Cooch Behar signed a defence treaty with the British East India Company on 5 April 1773. After expelling the Bhutanese, Cooch Behar became a princely kingdom under the protection of British East India company.

The Victor Jubilee Palace was based on Buckingham Palace and built in 1887, during the reign of Maharaja Nripendra Narayan. In 1878, the maharaja married the daughter of Brahmo preacher Keshab Chandra Sen. This union led to a renaissance in Cooch Behar state. Maharaja Nripendra Narayan is known as the architect of modern Cooch Behar town.

=== Post Independence ===
Under an agreement between the kings of Cooch Behar and the Indian Government at the end of British rule, Maharaja Jagaddipendra Narayan transferred full authority, jurisdiction and power of the state to the Dominion Government of India, effective 12 September 1949. Eventually, Cooch Bihar became part of the state of West Bengal on 19 January 1950, with Cooch Behar town as its headquarters.

== Geography ==
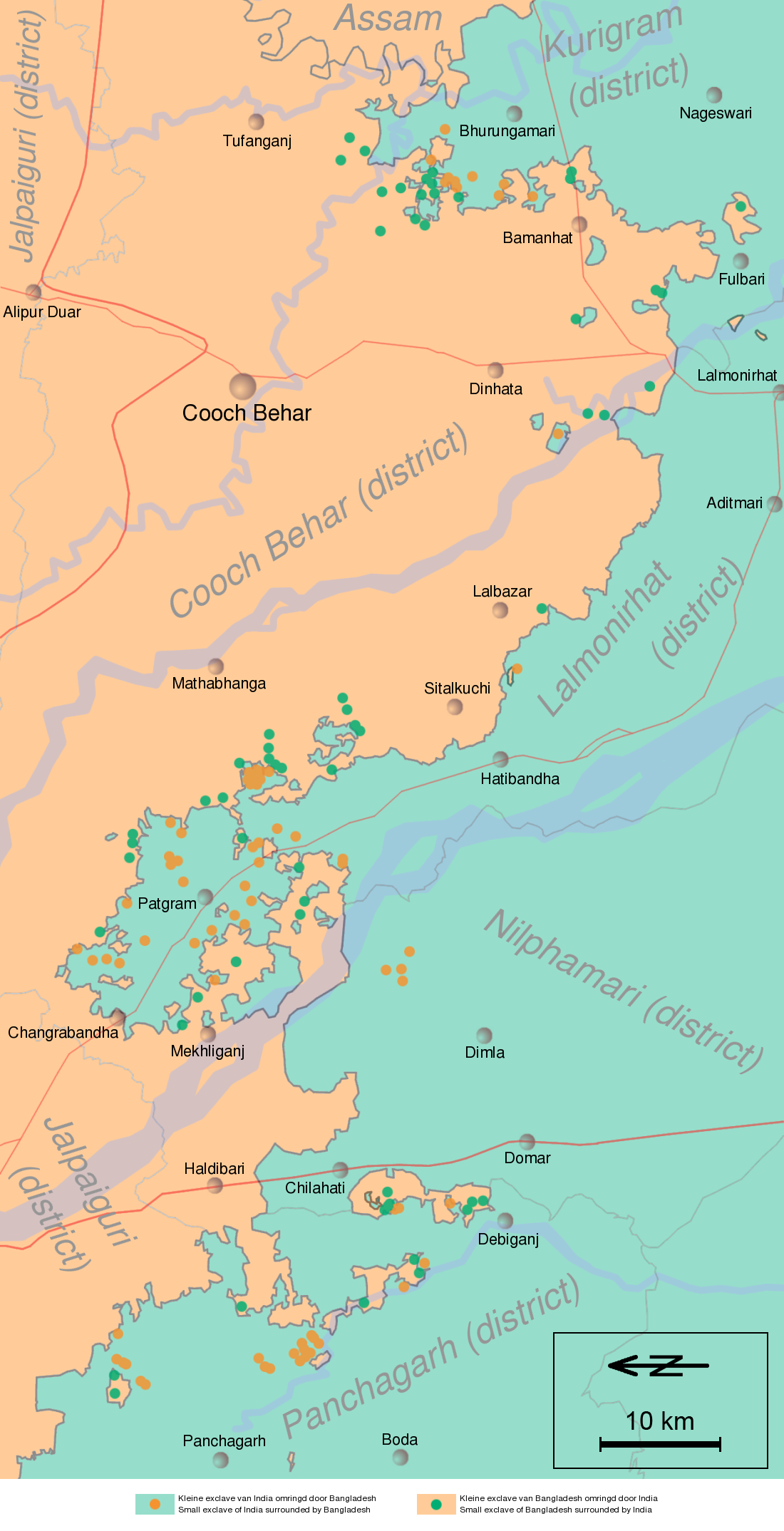
Former exclaves of India and Bangladesh in and around Cooch Behar district

Cooch Behar is a district under the Jalpaiguri Division of the state of West Bengal. Cooch Behar is located in the northeastern part of the state and bounded by the district of Jalpaiguri and Alipurduar in the north, Dhubri and Kokrajhar district of Assam in the east and by Bangladesh in the west as well as in the south. The district forms part of the Himalayan Terai of West Bengal.

A geopolitical curiosity was that there were 92 Bangladeshi exclaves, with a total area of 47.7 km^{2} in Cooch-Behar. Similarly, there were 106 Indian exclaves inside Bangladesh, with a total area of 69.5 km^{2}. These were part of the high stake card or chess games centuries ago between two regional kings, the Raja of Cooch Behar and the Maharaja of Rangpur.

Twenty-one of the Bangladeshi exclaves were within Indian exclaves, and three of the Indian exclaves were within Bangladeshi exclaves. The largest Indian exclave was Balapara Khagrabari which surrounded a Bangladeshi exclave, Upanchowki Bhajni, which itself surrounded an Indian exclave called Dahala Khagrabari, of less than one hectare (link to external map here ). But all this has ended in the historic India-Bangladesh land agreement. See Indo-Bangladesh enclaves.

=== Rivers and topography ===
Cooch Behar is a flat region with a slight southeastern slope along which the main rivers of the district flow. Most of the highland areas are in the Sitalkuchi region and most of the low-lying lands lie in Dinhata region.

The rivers in the district of Cooch Behar generally flow from northwest to southeast. Seven rivers that cut through the district are the Teesta, Jaldhaka, Torsha, Kaljani, Raidak, Sankosh (Gadadhar) and Ghargharia.

=== Flora and fauna ===
In 1976 Cooch Behar district became home to the Jaldapara Wildlife Sanctuary (now Jaldapara National Park), which has an area of 217 km^{2} (83.8 mi^{2}). It shares the park with Alipurduar district.

== Demographics ==
Historical population
Year	Pop.	±% p.a.
1901	565,116	—
1911	591,012	+0.45%
1921	590,599	−0.01%
1931	589,053	−0.03%
1941	638,703	+0.81%
1951	668,949	+0.46%
1961	1,019,806	+4.31%
1971	1,414,183	+3.32%
1981	1,771,643	+2.28%
1991	2,171,145	+2.05%
2001	2,479,155	+1.34%
2011	2,819,086	+1.29%

According to the 2011 census Cooch Behar district has a population of 2,819,086, roughly equal to the nation of Jamaica. This gives it a ranking of 136th in India (out of a total of 739). The district has a population density of 833 inhabitants per square kilometre (2,160/sq mi). Its population growth rate over the decade 2001–2011 was 13.86%. Koch Bihar has a sex ratio of 942 females for every 1000 males, and a literacy rate of 75.49%. 10.27% of the population lives in urban areas. Scheduled Castes and Scheduled Tribes make up 1,414,336 (50.17%) and 18,125 (0.64%) of the population respectively. Cooch Behar is the only district in India where Scheduled Castes make up a majority of the population.

=== Religion ===
Religions in Cooch Behar district (2011)
Religion	Percent
Hinduism	74.05%
Islam	25.54%
Other or not stated	0.41%

Religion in present-day Cooch Behar district
Religion	Population (1941)	Percentage (1941)	Population (2011)	Percentage (2011)
Hinduism	394,948	61.63%	2,087,766	74.05%
Islam	242,684	37.87%	720,033	25.54%
Others (Note: Including Jainism, Buddhism, Christianity, Zoroastrianism, Judaism, Ad-Dharmis, or not stated)	3,210	0.5%	11,287	0.41%
Total Population	640,842	100%	2,819,086	100%

Hinduism is the majority religion. Islam is the minority religion, and is mainly rural. Muslims are a significant minority in Dinhata I (36.98%), Dinhata II (36.68%) and Sitalkuchi (35.31%) blocks.

=== Language ===
Languages of Cooch Behar district (2011)
1. Bengali (94.8%)
2. 'Other' Bengali (2.01%)
3. Rajbongshi (1.31%)
4. Hindi (1.17%)
5. Others (0.72%)

At the time of the 2011 census, 94.79% of the population spoke Bengali, 1.31% Rajbongshi and 1.17% Hindi as their first language. 2.01% of the population recorded their language as 'Others' under Bengali.

== Government and politics ==
=== Divisions ===
==== Sub-divisions ====
The district of Cooch Behar comprises five sub-divisions:

- Cooch Behar Sadar subdivision
- Dinhata subdivision
- Mathabhanga subdivision
- Tufanganj subdivision
- Mekhliganj subdivision

==== Assembly constituencies ====
As per order of the 2008 Delimitation Commission in respect of the delimitation of constituencies in the West Bengal, the district is divided into 9 assembly constituencies:

== Politics ==
No.	Constituency	Name	Party	Remarks
1	Mekliganj	Dadhiram Ray	Bharatiya Janata Party	
2	Mathabhanga	Nisith Pramanik	Bharatiya Janata Party	Cabinet Minister
3	Cooch Behar Uttar	Sukumar Roy	Bharatiya Janata Party	
4	Cooch Behar Dakshin	Rathindra Bose	Bharatiya Janata Party	Speaker
5	Sitalkuchi	Sabitri Barman	Bharatiya Janata Party	
6	Sitai	Sangita Roy	All India Trinamool Congress	
7	Dinhata	Ajay Ray	Bharatiya Janata Party	
8	Natabari	Girija Shankar Ray	Bharatiya Janata Party	
9	Tufanganj	Malati Rava Roy	Bharatiya Janata Party	Ministers of State (Independent Charge)

Mekliganj, Mathabhanga, Cooch Behar Uttar, Sitalkuchi and Sitai constituencies are reserved for Scheduled Castes (SC) candidates. Mekhliganj constituency is part of Jalpaiguri (Lok Sabha constituency), which also contains six assembly segments from Jalpaiguri district. Mathabhanga, Cooch Behar Uttar, Cooch Behar Dakshin, Sitalkuchi, Sitai, Dinhata and Natabari constituencies form the Cooch Behar (Lok Sabha constituency), which is reserved for Scheduled Castes (SC). Tufanganj constituency is part of Alipurduars (Lok Sabha constituency), which also contains six assembly segments from Alipurduar and Jalpaiguri districts.

== Education ==
- Baramaricha Delwar Hossain (X+2) High School
- Suniti Academy

== Towns and villages ==
- Bhetaguri
- Dhalpal
- Maheshwar
- Sajerpar Ghoramara

== Geographical indication ==
Kalonunia rice was awarded the Geographical Indication (GI) status tag from the Geographical Indications Registry under the Union Government of India on 2 January 2024 (valid until 11 March 2034). It is a common and widely cultivated crop in districts of Cooch Behar, Jalpaiguri and Alipurduar along with some parts of Darjeeling & Kalimpong districts of West Bengal.

State Agricultural Management & Extension Training Institute (SAMETI) from Narendrapur, proposed the GI registration of Kalonunia rice. After filing the application in March 2021, the rice was granted the GI tag in 2024 by the Geographical Indication Registry in Chennai, making the name "Kalonunia rice" exclusive to the rice grown in the region. It thus became the third rice variety from West Bengal after Tulaipanji rice and the 26th type of goods from West Bengal to earn the GI tag.

The GI tag protects the rice from illegal selling and marketing, and gives it legal protection and a unique identity.

== Notable people ==
- Amiya Bhushan Majumdar, Indian novelist and short-story writer
- Anjana Bhowmick, (1944-2024), Indian actress
- Dinesh Chandra Dakua, (1929 or 1930 – 2025), West Bengal cabinet minister
- Dipak Giri (born 1984), Indian writer and academic
- Fazle Haque (born 1933), state minister
- Fulati Gidali (1911-2019), Indian folk singer
- Kamal Guha (1928–2007), Agriculture Minister of West Bengal
- Mouni Roy (born 1985), Indian actress
- Nisith Pramanik (born 1986), West Bengal cabinet minister
- Rabindra Nath Ghosh, West Bengal cabinet minister
- Rathindra Bose, 11th Speaker of the West Bengal Legislative Assembly
- Samar Deb, (1963), Indian writer
- Sree Parabat (1927-2010), Indian writer and journalist
- Thakur Panchanan (1918-2001), Indian social reformer
- Udayan Guha (born 1955), West Bengal cabinet minister

== See also ==
- Indo-Bangladesh enclaves
- List of enclaves and exclaves
- List of West Bengal districts ranked by literacy rate
