= Bhetaguri =

Bhetaguri ভেটাগুড়ি
- City
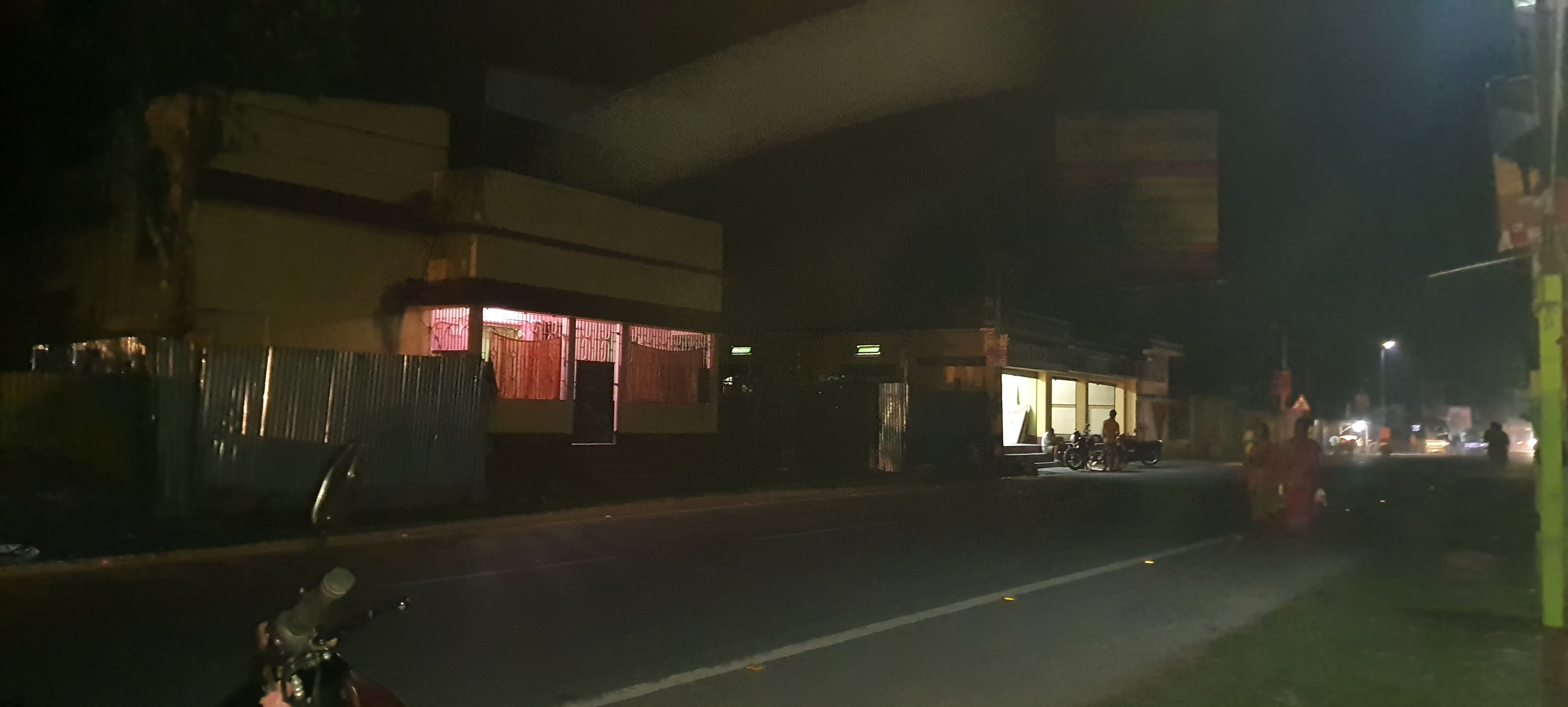
- Interactive map of Bhetaguri
- Coordinates: 26°12′05.57″N 89°28′22.57″E
- Country: India
- State: West Bengal
- District: Cooch Behar
  - Rank: Small town

Population
  - Total: 25,000

Languages
  - Official: Bengali, English, Hindi
- Time zone: UTC+5:30 (IST)
- PIN: 736134
- ISO 3166 code: IN-WB

Bhetaguri is a small town in Cooch Behar, West Bengal, India. Bhetaguri is connected to Cooch Behar, which is 20 km north-north-west of it, through SH12A and Northeastern Railway.
