= Renuka Sinha =

Indian politician

Renuka

Member of Parliament, Lok Sabha
- In office 16 May 2014 – 17 August 2016
- Preceded by: Nripendra Nath Roy
- Succeeded by: Partha Pratim Roy
- Constituency: Cooch Behar

Personal details
- Born: 5 March 1949
- Died: 17 August 2016 (aged 67)
- Party: Trinamool Congress
- Spouse: Baldeb Sinha
- Education: University of Calcutta

Renuka Sinha (5 March 1949 – 17 August 2016) was an Indian politician and a member of parliament to the 16th Lok Sabha from Cooch Behar constituency, West Bengal. She won the 2014 general elections being an All India Trinamool Congress candidate. She was a graduate of the University of Calcutta. She died on 17 August due to a heart attack.
