= Rasikbil =

Lake in Cooch Behar district, West Bengal

Rasikbil (রসিকবিল)
- Rasik Bil
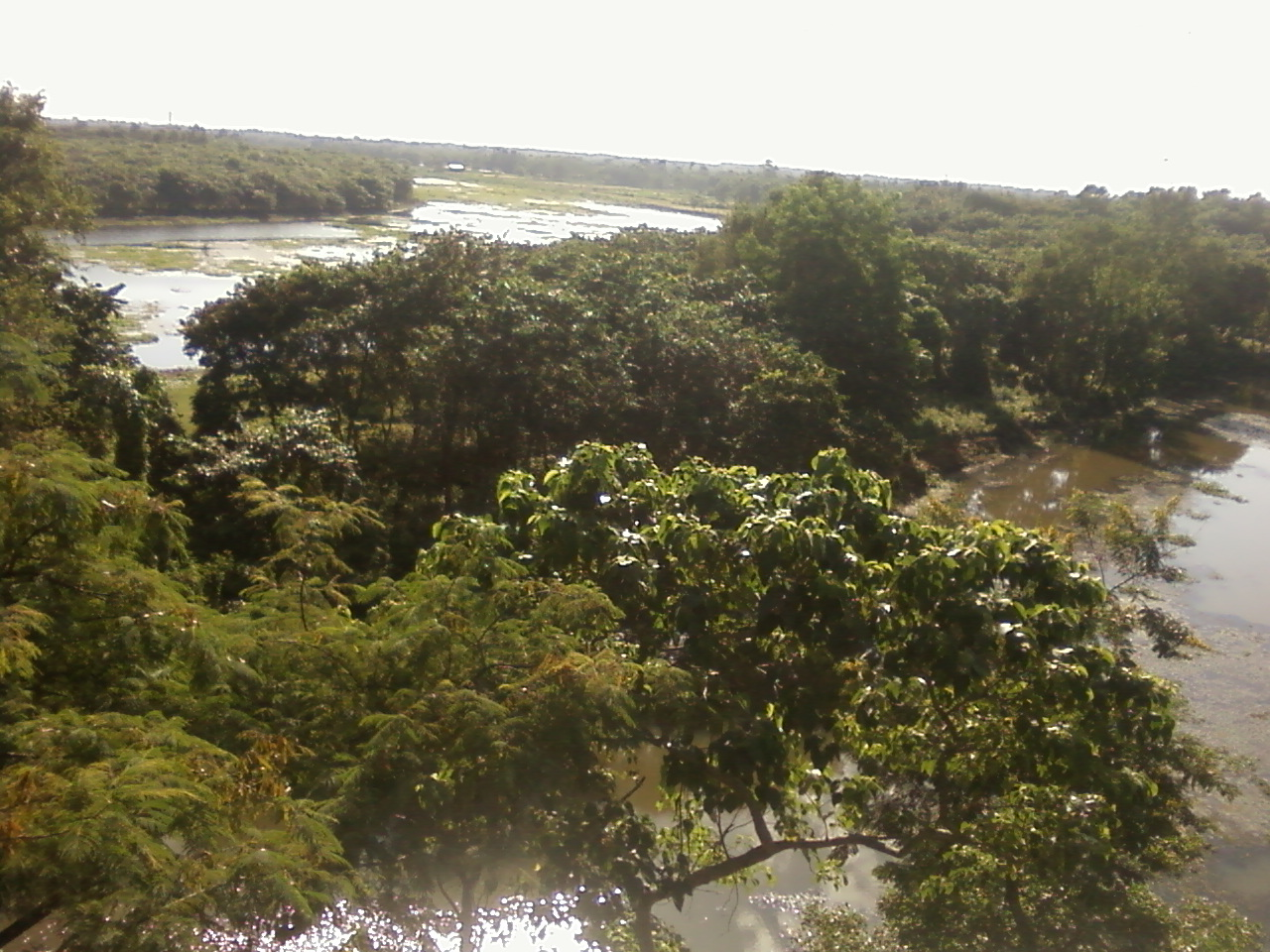
- Rasik Bil lake

- Location within West Bengal Location within India
- Location: Cooch Behar district, West Bengal
- Coordinates: 26°24′50″N 89°43′30″E
- Basin countries: India

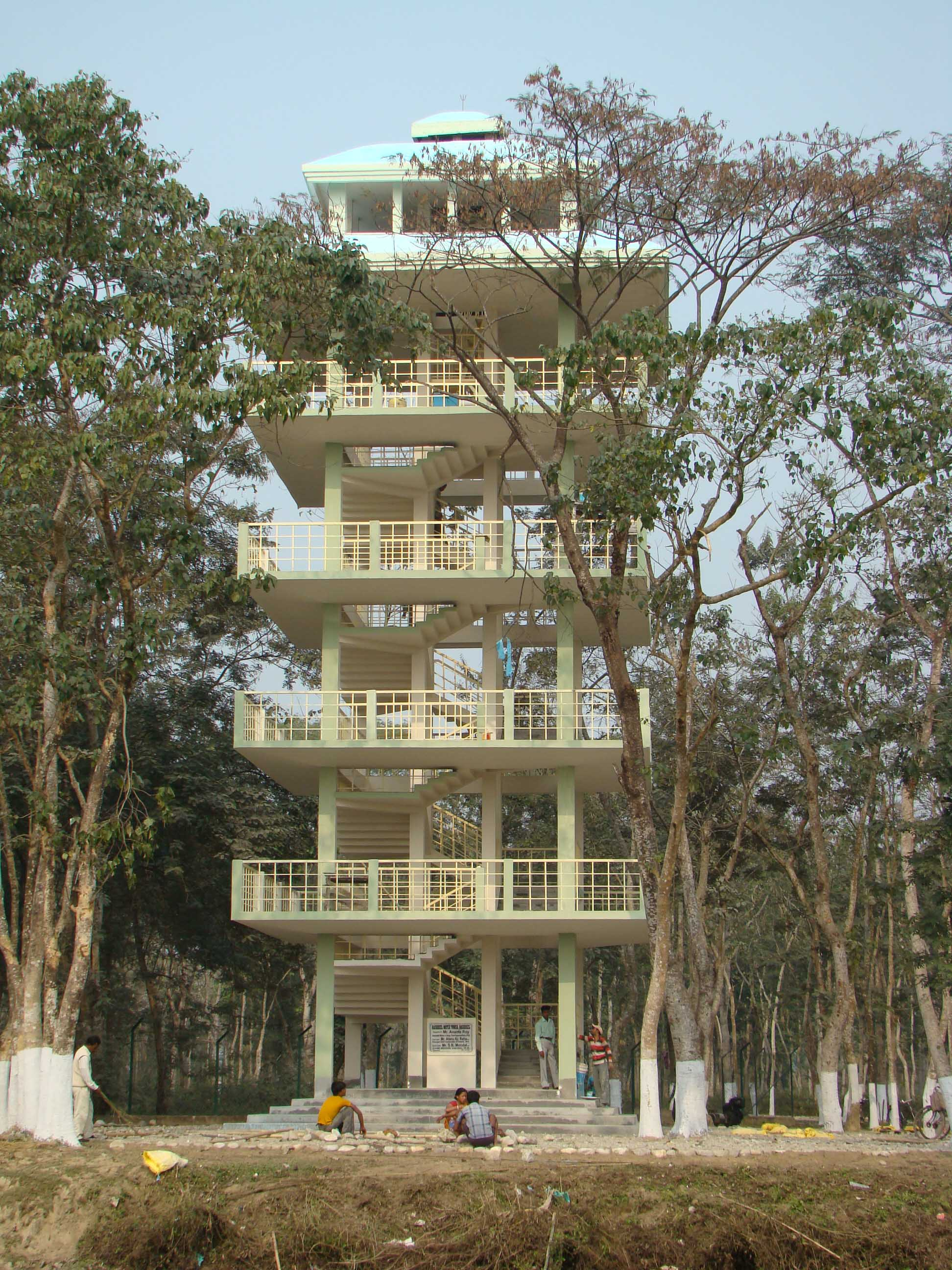
Watch tower at Rasikbeel

Rasikbil, also known as Rasik Bil or Rasikbeel, is a small lake and wetland situated in the Cooch Behar district of West Bengal, India. The nearest town is Kamakhyaguri.

== Fauna ==
This lake attracts a variety of birds. They make nests in the trees around the lake. The bird species which live in and around the lake includes cormorants, different varieties of storks, ibis, spoonbill, kingfisher, parrots, owls, and many others. There is a deer park and a crocodile rehabilitation center by the side of the lake. There is also a leopard house, python house, aviary, and tortoise rescue entre. Birds species include lesser whistling duck, Eurasian teal, ferruginous duck, red-crested pochard, northern shoveler, northern pintail, Eurasian wigeon, grey-headed lapwing, northern lapwing, pied kingfisher, stork-billed kingfisher, common kingfisher, little cormorant, great cormorant, and gadwall.

== Location ==
Rasikbil is situated in Cooch Behar district, Tufanganj subdivision. The nearest town Kamakhyaguri. From Kamakhyaguri, it is about 7.5 km (4.7 mi) away. The nearest railway station is Kamakhyaguri Railway Station. Cars are available for hire at the station.

== Gallery ==
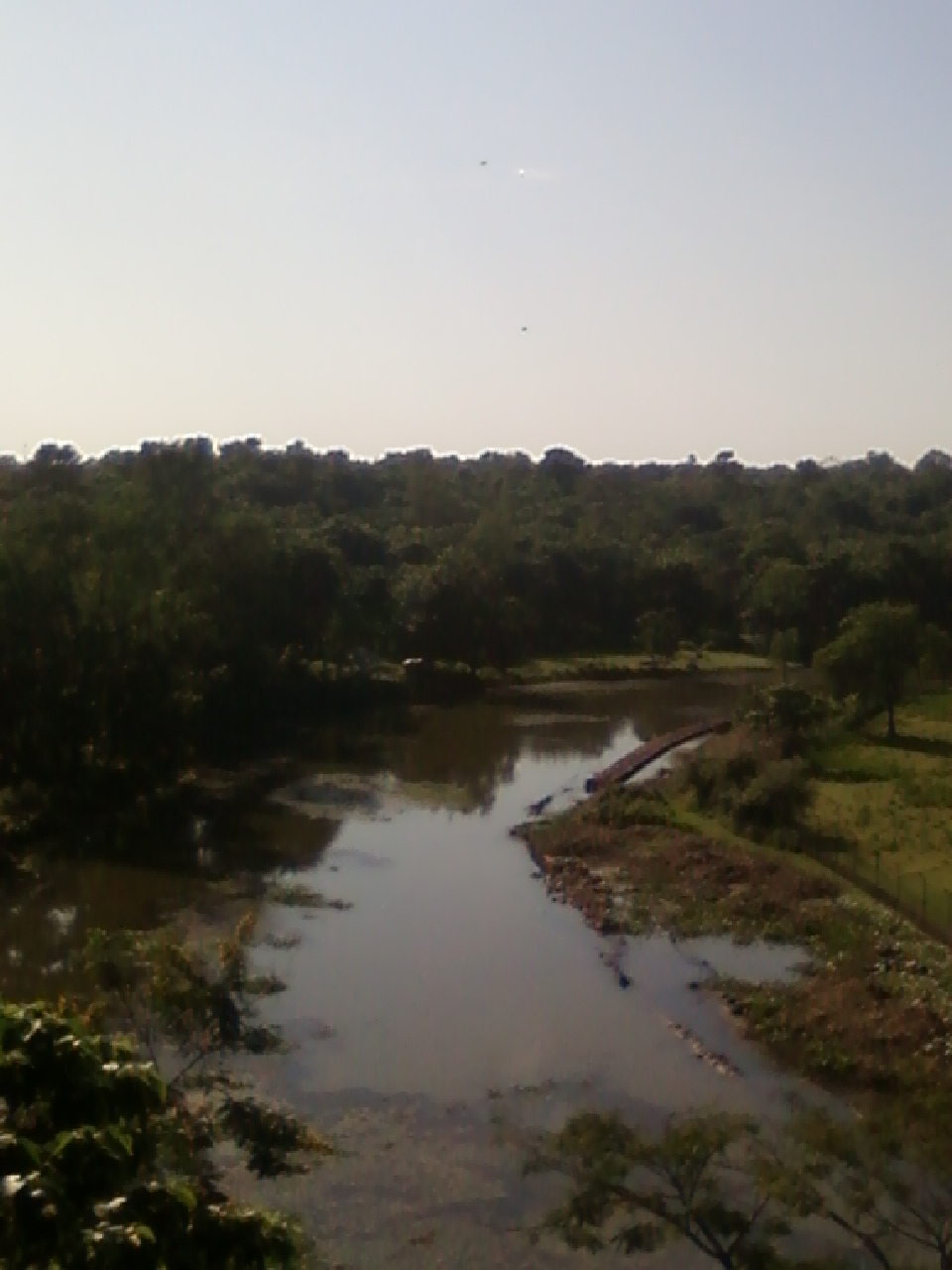
Rasikbil Bird Sanctuary

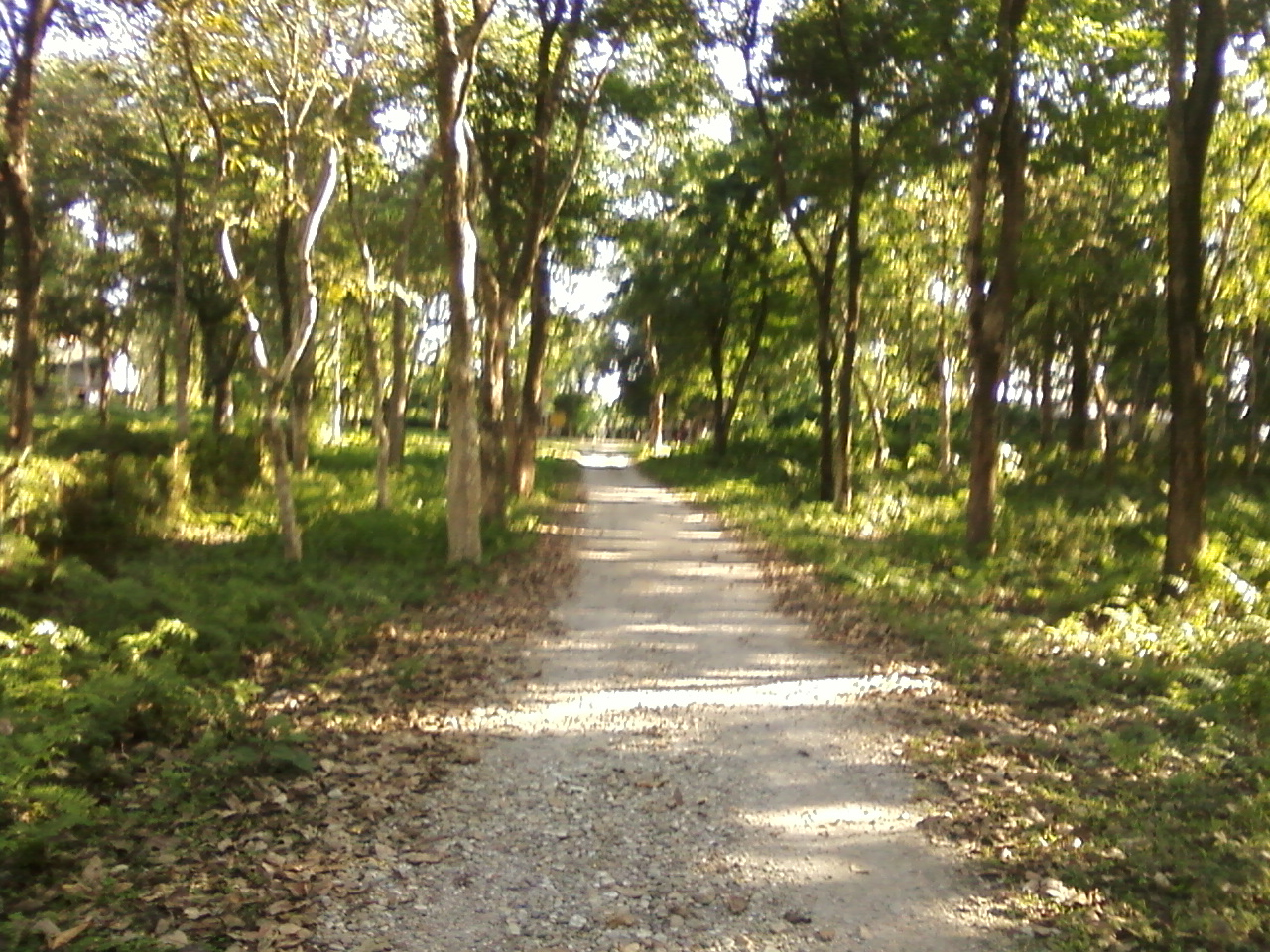
A trail in Rasikbil
