= Sajerpar Ghoramara =

- village
- Sajerpar Ghoramara

- Location in West Bengal, India
- Coordinates: 26.41°N 89.35°E
- Country: India
- State: West Bengal
- District: Cooch Behar

Languages
  - Official: Bengali, English
- Time zone: UTC+5:30 (IST)
- PIN: 736165
- Nearest city: Sajerpar Ghoramara
- Website: spghoramara.gq

Sajerpar Ghoramara is a small village in Cooch Behar district of West Bengal, India.
