= Natabari Assembly constituency =

Natabari
- Constituency No. 8 for the West Bengal Legislative Assembly
- Interactive Map Outlining Natabari Assembly Constituency

Constituency details
- Country: India
- Region: East India
- State: West Bengal
- District: Cooch Behar
- Lok Sabha constituency: Cooch Behar (SC)
- Established: 1977
- Total electors: 240,383
- Reservation: None

Member of Legislative Assembly
- 18th West Bengal Legislative Assembly
- Incumbent Girija Shankar Ray
- Party: Bharatiya Janata Party
- Elected year: 2026

Most Successful parties from Natabari assembly
1. Communist Party of India (Marxist) (7 times) (63.6%)
2. All India Trinamool Congress (2 times) (18.2%)
3. Bharatiya Janata Party (2 times) (18.2%)

Natabari Assembly constituency is an assembly constituency in Cooch Behar district in the Indian state of West Bengal.

== Overview ==
As per orders of the Delimitation Commission, No. 8 Natabari Assembly constituency covers Deoanhat, Dauaguri, Guriahati I, Guriahati II, Jiranpur and Panisala gram panchayats of Cooch Behar I community development block and Andaran Fulbari II, Balarampur I, Balarampur II, Chilkhana I, Chilkhana II, Deocharai, Dhalpal II, Maruganj, Natabari I, Natabari II gram panchayats of Tufanganj I community development block.

Natabari Assembly constituency is part of No. 1 Cooch Behar (Lok Sabha constituency) (SC).

== Members of the Legislative Assembly ==
Election Year	Name of M.L.A.	Party Affiliation
1977	Sibendra Narayan Chowdhury	Communist Party of India (Marxist)
1982	Sibendra Narayan Chowdhury	Communist Party of India (Marxist)
1987	Sibendra Narayan Chowdhury	Communist Party of India (Marxist)
1991	Sibendra Narayan Chowdhury	Communist Party of India (Marxist)
1996	Sibendra Narayan Chowdhury	Communist Party of India (Marxist)
2001	Tamser Ali	Communist Party of India (Marxist)
2006	Tamser Ali	Communist Party of India (Marxist)
2011	Rabindra Nath Ghosh	All India Trinamool Congress
2016	Rabindra Nath Ghosh	All India Trinamool Congress
2021	Mihir Goswami	Bharatiya Janata Party
2026	Girija Shankar Ray	Bharatiya Janata Party

== Election results ==
=== 2026 ===
In the 2026 West Bengal Legislative Assembly election, Girija Shankar Ray of BJP defeated his nearest rival Sailendra Nath Barma of TMC by 34,613 votes.

2026 West Bengal Legislative Assembly election: Natabari
Party	Candidate	Votes	%	±%
BJP	Girija Shankar Ray	126,911	54.53	▲3.08
AITC	Sailendra Nath Barma	92,298	39.66	▼1
CPI(M)	Akik Hassan	6,606	2.84	▼2.61
INC	Biswajit Sarkar	2,516	1.08	▼1.75
SUCI(C)	Abdus Salam	976	0.42	▼0.13
IND	Sahidul Hossain	814	0.35	▼0.27
IND	Mrinal Kanti Saha	677	0.29	New entry
AJUP	Md. Sakowat Ali	431	0.19	New entry
IND	Raghunath Biswas	374	0.16	New entry
NOTA	Nota	1,113	0.48	▼0.05
Majority		34,613	14.87	▲4.08
Turnout		232,716	96.81	▲8.18
Registered electors		240,383		▼1.9
BJP hold		Swing	2.04	

=== 2021 ===
West Bengal Legislative Assembly election, 2021: Natabari
Party	Candidate	Votes	%	±%
BJP	Mihir Goswami	111,743	51.45	
AITC	Rabindra Nath Ghosh	88,303	40.66	
CPI(M)	Akik Hasan	11,839	5.45	
NOTA	None of the above	1,146	0.53	
Majority		23,440	10.79	
Turnout		217,173	88.63	
BJP gain from AITC		Swing		

=== 2011 ===
2011 West Bengal Legislative Assembly election: Natabari
Party	Candidate	Votes	%	±%
AITC	Rabindra Nath Ghosh	81,951	47.56	
CPI(M)	Tamser Ali	74,386	43.17	
BJP	Utpal Deb	9,923	5.76	
Independent	Siddik Uddin Bepari	2,972	1.72	
RPI	Girindra Nath Barman	1,867	1.08	
Independent	Prodyut Kumar Dey	1,197	0.69	
Majority		7,565	4.39	
Turnout		153,564	89.10	
Swing to AITC from CPI(M)		Swing		

=== 2006 ===
2006 West Bengal Legislative Assembly election: Natabari
Party	Candidate	Votes	%	±%
CPI(M)	Tamser Ali	67,845	48.84	
AITC	Rabindra Nath Ghosh	63,009	45.36	
INC	Suchitra Bepari	3,932	2.83	
Independent	Pradip Kumar Roy	2,413	1.74	
BSP	Subhash Byapari	1,717	1.24	
Majority		4,836	3.48	
Turnout				
CPI(M) hold		Swing		

=== 2001 ===
2001 West Bengal Legislative Assembly election: Natabari
Party	Candidate	Votes	%	±%
CPI(M)	Tamser Ali	59,779	48.49	
AITC	Rabindranath Ghosh	51,525	41.79	
BJP	Bimal Kumar Sarkar	5,460	4.43	
Independent	Pradip Kumar Roy	2,451	1.99	
BSP	Gopal Chandra Roy	1,959	1.59	
AMB	Dalendra Roy	1,252	1.02	
Independent	Achiruddin Ahmed	866	0.70	
Majority		8,254	6.70	
Turnout		123,352	86.35	
CPI(M) hold		Swing		

=== 1996 ===
1996 West Bengal Legislative Assembly election: Natabari
Party	Candidate	Votes	%	±%
CPI(M)	Sibendra Narayan Chowdhuri	57,830	48.12	
INC	Rabindra Nath Ghosh	48,172	40.09	
BJP	Rabindra Nath Barman	10,556	8.78	
BSP	Narayan Chandra Das	2,126	1.77	
FB(S)	Abdul Rahaman	866	0.72	
Independent	Achhar Uddin Ahmed	473	0.39	
AMB	Dalendra Roy	149	0.12	
Majority		9,658	8.03	
Turnout		123,514	90.75	
CPI(M) hold		Swing		

=== 1991 ===
1991 West Bengal Legislative Assembly election: Natabari
Party	Candidate	Votes	%	±%
CPI(M)	Sibendranarayan Chowdhury	50,784	47.81	
INC	Biimbal Ch. Dhar	33,148	31.21	
BJP	Rabindra Nath Barman	19,712	18.56	
BSP	Narayan Dass	1,745	1.64	
Independent	Nazrul Islam	374	0.35	
Independent	Santana Datta	255	0.24	
AMB	Haribala Roy	201	0.19	
Majority		17,636	16.60	
Turnout		108,665	86.72	
CPI(M) hold		Swing		

=== 1987 ===
1987 West Bengal Legislative Assembly election: Natabari
Party	Candidate	Votes	%	±%
CPI(M)	Sibendra Narayan Chowdhury	49,564	53.21	
INC	Santosh Kumar Roy	41,487	44.54	
Independent	Amalendu Deb	983	1.06	
Independent	Mani Bhusan Singha Sarkar	888	0.95	
Independent	Haribala Roy	218	0.23	
Majority		8,077	8.67	
Turnout		94,728	85.55	
CPI(M) hold		Swing		

=== 1982 ===
1982 West Bengal Legislative Assembly election: Natabari
Party	Candidate	Votes	%	±%
CPI(M)	Sibendra Narayan Chowdhury	45,054	56.03	
INC	Santosh Kumar Roy	35,034	43.57	
Independent	Dhirendra Nath Barma	320	0.40	
Majority		10,020	12.46	
Turnout		81,698	89.69	
CPI(M) hold		Swing		

=== 1977 ===
1977 West Bengal Legislative Assembly election: Natabari
Party	Candidate	Votes	%	±%
CPI(M)	Sibendra Narayan Chowdhury	26,300	51.67	
INC	Santosh Kumar Roy	12,486	24.53	
Independent	Jatindra Nath Singha Sarkar	8,666	17.03	
JP	Prabhat Kumar Basu	3,444	6.77	
Majority		13,814	27.14	
Turnout		51,672	69.50	
CPI(M) win (new seat)				
