= Fulati Gidali =

Indian folk singer (1911–2019)

- Born: 1911
- Died: 22 August 2019 (aged 108)
- Occupation: Folk singer
- Awards: Academy Award (2010); Banga Ratna (2013)

Fulati Gidali (1911 – 22 August 2019) was an Indian folk singer who was known as the "Shaitol Empress".

== Biography ==
Fulati Gidali was born in 1911. She sang "Shaitol" (A type of folk song from Cooch Bihar, West Bengal, India). For her contribution to this arena she was awarded Academy Award by Rabindra Bharati University in 2010. Then she received Banga Ratna from West Bengal Government in 2013. She died on 22 August 2019 at the age of 108.
