= Sangita Roy =

Indian politician in West Bengal

- সঙ্গীতা রায়

Member of the West Bengal Legislative Assembly
- Incumbent
- Assumed office 23 November 2024
- Preceded by: Jagadish Chandra Barma Basunia
- Constituency: Sitai

Personal details
- Born: Sitai, Cooch Behar, West Bengal 736167
- Party: All India Trinamool Congress (until 2026); Mamata All India Trinamool Congress (from 2026)
- Spouse: Jagadish Chandra Barma Basunia
- Parent: Samar Ranjan Roy
- Occupation: Social Service; Sahayika SSK
- Profession: Politician

Sangita Roy (born 1972) is an Indian politician from West Bengal. She is a member of the West Bengal Legislative Assembly since 23 November 2024, representing Sitai Assembly constituency. She is a member of the Mamata All India Trinamool Congress.

== Early life and education ==
She is from Sitai, Cooch Behar district of West Bengal. Her education qualification is Higher Secondary (12th pass) from Mc William Higher Secondary School, affiliated to the West Bengal Council of Rabindra Open Schooling.

== Political career ==
Roy entered in mainstream politics by winning 2024 West Bengal Legislative Assembly by-election after Jagadish Chandra Barma Basunia resign from the seat, as he has elected as an MP from Cooch Behar Lok Sabha constituency. In May 2026, she has been elected as an MLA from the same constituency for the second time.

=== Controversy ===
Arun Kumar Barma, candidate of All India Forward Bloc, alleged that during the Panchayat election 2023, as a Sitai Panchayat Samiti candidate she submitted her documents where she mentioned the name of Jagadish Chandra Barma Basunia as her husband. But this time during the submission of her nomination for the Assembly by-election she produced an affidavit with her father's name deceased Samar Ranjan Roy concealing her husband's name.

=== Electoral performance ===
West Bengal Legislative Assembly
Year	Constituency	Party	Votes	%	Opponent	Party	Votes	%	Margin	Result
2024^	Sitai	AITC	165,984	76.08	Dipak Kumar Roy	BJP	35,348	16.20	130,636	Won
2026	Sitai	AITC	128,188	48.31	Ashutosh Barma	BJP	125,467	47.29	2,721	Won

- ^ by-election

== See also ==
- 2026 West Bengal Legislative Assembly election
- List of chief ministers of West Bengal
- West Bengal Legislative Assembly
- 18th West Bengal Assembly
