= Deocharai, Cooch Behar =

Deocharai
- Village
- Location in West Bengal, India Deocharai (India)
- Coordinates: 26.2685°N 89.6107°E
- Country: India
- State: West Bengal
- District: Cooch Behar
- Subdistrict: Tufanganj
- Time zone: UTC+05:30 (IST)
- Pincode: 736156
- ISO 3166 code: IN-WB

Deocharai is a village of Cooch Behar district, West Bengal, India.
