= Sitai Assembly constituency =

Sitai (SC)
- Constituency No. 6 for the West Bengal Legislative Assembly
- Interactive Map Outlining Sitai (SC) Assembly Constituency

Constituency details
- Country: India
- Region: East India
- State: West Bengal
- District: Cooch Behar
- Lok Sabha constituency: Cooch Behar (SC)
- Established: 1967
- Total electors: 273,362
- Reservation: SC

Member of Legislative Assembly
- 18th West Bengal Legislative Assembly
- Incumbent Sangita Roy
- Party: All India Trinamool Congress
- Elected year: 2026

Most Successful parties from Sitai (SC) assembly
1. Indian National Congress (6 times) (37.5%)
2. All India Forward Bloc (5 times) (31.2%)
3. All India Trinamool Congress (4 times) (25.0%)
4. Independent (1 time) (6.25%)

Sitai (SC) is an assembly constituency in Cooch Behar district in the Indian state of West Bengal. It is reserved for scheduled castes.

== Overview ==
As per orders of the Delimitation Commission, No. 6 Sitai Assembly constituency covers Sitai community development block and Bara Atiabari I, Bara Atiabari II, Bara Soulmari, Bhetaguri II, Gitaldaha I, Gitaldaha II, Gosanimari I, Gosanimari II, Matalhat, Okrabari and Petla Putimari II gram panchayats of Dinhata I community development block.

Sitai Assembly constituency is part of No. 1 Cooch Behar (Lok Sabha constituency) (SC).

== Members of the Legislative Assembly ==
Year	Name	Party
1967	Dr. Md. Fazle Haque	Indian National Congress
1969	Dr. Md. Fazle Haque	Indian National Congress
1971	Dr. Md. Fazle Haque	Indian National Congress
1972	Dr. Md. Fazle Haque	Indian National Congress
1977	Dipak Sengupta	All India Forward Bloc
1982	Dipak Sengupta	All India Forward Bloc
1987	Dipak Sengupta	All India Forward Bloc
1991	Dipak Sengupta	All India Forward Bloc
1996	Dr. Md. Fazle Haque	Independent politician
2001	Nripendra Nath Roy	All India Forward Bloc
2006	Dr. Md. Fazle Haque	Indian National Congress
2011	Keshab Chandra Roy	Indian National Congress
2016	Jagadish Chandra Barma Basunia	All India Trinamool Congress
2021	Jagadish Chandra Barma Basunia	All India Trinamool Congress
2024^	Sangita Roy	All India Trinamool Congress
2026	Sangita Roy	All India Trinamool Congress

- ^ by-election

== Election results ==
=== 2026 ===
In the 2026 West Bengal Legislative Assembly election, Sangita Roy of TMC defeated her nearest rival Ashutosh Barma of BJP by 2,721 votes.

2026 West Bengal Legislative Assembly election: Sitai (SC)
Party	Candidate	Votes	%	±%
AITC	Sangita Roy	128,188	48.31	▼27.77
BJP	Ashutosh Barma	125,467	47.29	▲31.09
INC	Rabin Roy	3,262	1.23	▼2.98
AIFB	Arun Kumar Barma	2,105	0.79	▼0.73
SUCI(C)	Binapani Ray	1,809	0.68	New entry
AJUP	Manik Roy	1,384	0.52	New entry
IND	Sunil Chandra Mahanta	1,241	0.47	New entry
IND	Goutam Roy	539	0.2	New entry
NOTA	Nota	1,324	0.5	▼0.5
Majority		2,721	1.02	▼58.86
Turnout		265,319	97.06	▲14.95
Registered electors		273,362		▼5.92
AITC hold		Swing	29.43	

=== 2024 bypoll ===
2024 West Bengal Legislative Assembly by-election: Sitai
Party	Candidate	Votes	%	±%
AITC	Sangita Roy	165,984	76.08	▲26.66
BJP	Dipak Kumar Roy	35,348	16.20	▼28.98
INC	Harihar Roy Singha	9,177	4.21	▲2.55
AIFB	Arun Kumar Barma	3,319	1.52	New
NOTA	None of the above	1,317		
Majority		130,636		
Turnout		215,145		
AITC hold		Swing		

=== 2021 ===
2021 West Bengal Legislative Assembly election: Sitai (SC) constituency
Party	Candidate	Votes	%	±%
AITC	Jagadish Chandra Barma Basunia	117,908	49.42	
BJP	Dipak Kumar Roy	107,796	45.18	
INC	Keshab Chandra Roy	3,964	1.66	
Independent	Sunil Mahanta	2,391	1.0	
NOTA	None of the above	1,577	0.66	
Majority		10,112	4.24	
Turnout		238,578	82.11	
AITC hold		Swing		

=== 2011 ===
In the 2011 elections, Keshab Chandra Roy of Congress defeated his nearest rival Dipak Kumar Roy of AIFB.

West Bengal assembly elections, 2011: Sitai (SC) constituency
Party	Candidate	Votes	%	±%
INC	Keshab Chandra Ray	79,791	46.63	−0.67
AIFB	Dipak Kumar Roy	78,214	45.71	+1.62
BJP	Brajo Gobinda Barman	5,185	3.03	
Independent	Bhajan Biswas	2,904		
SUCI	Anil Chandra Barman Roy	2,035		
Independent	Goutam Barman	1,613		
Independent	Tapas Barman	1,220		
Turnout		171,102	81.84	
INC hold		Swing	2.29	

=== 2006 ===
In the 2006 state assembly elections, Dr. Md. Fazle Haque of Congress won the Sitai seat defeating his nearest rival Nripendra Nath Roy of Forward Bloc. Contests in most years were multi cornered but only winners and runners are being mentioned. In 2001, Nripendra Nath Roy of Forward Bloc defeated Dr. Md. Fazle Haque of Congress. In 1996, Dr. Md. Fazle Haque, Independent, defeated Nripendra Nath Roy of Forward Bloc. Dipak Sengupta of Forward Block defeated Dr. Md. Fazle Haque of Congress in 1991, 1987 and 1982, and Sushil Roy Sarkar of Congress in 1977.

=== 1972 ===
Dr. Md Fazle Haque of Congress won the seat in 1972, 1971, 1969 and 1967. Prior to that the seat was not there.
