= Prasenjit Barman =

Indian politician (1934–2021)

Prasenjit Barman

Prasenjit Barman (1 October 1934 – 22 December 2021) was an Indian politician and lawyer from Cooch Behar, northern West Bengal. He was a member of the West Bengal Legislative Assembly from 1967 to 1970, and a Rajya Sabha Member of Parliament from 1976 to 1982. He was noted for advocacy for Rajbanshi culture and language, including efforts to secure the restoration of the Cooch Behar Palace.

== Political career ==
Barman was politically active in the Indian National Congress. He was twice a member of the West Bengal Legislative Assembly, representing the Cooch Behar West constituency between 1967–1968 and 1969–1970. For the 1971 election, the Congress Party fielded Rajani Das as their candidate for Cooch Behar West instead.

Barman was a member of the Rajya Sabha, the upper house of the parliament of India, between 3 April 1976, and 2 April 1982, as a Congress Party parliamentarian representing West Bengal. Barman later joined the Trinamool Congress. The Trinamool Congress fielded Barman as its candidate for the Cooch Behar Uttar seat in the 2011 West Bengal Legislative Assembly election - he finished in second place with 82,628 votes (43.94%).

Barman was active in socio-cultural issues of the Rajbanshi people for many years. He was the president of the Cooch Behar Kshatriya Samiti for an extended period. He would often contribute with articles to different publications, relating to socio-cultural issues of the Rajbanshi people. In Cooch Behar, he was recognized for his efforts as a Rajya Sabha member which led to the restoration of the Cooch Behar royal palace. He was a member of Cooch Behar Debuttor Trust and Cooch Behar Heritage Committee. When the Mamata Banerjee government instituted the Rajbanshi Bhasa Academy, a state institution promoting Rajbanshi language, Barman was appointed as its chairman.

== Personal life ==
He was born on 1 October 1934, as the son of Chandra Mohan Barman. He studied Law and obtained Bachelor of Arts and Bachelor of Laws degrees. As a lawyer, he practised law in Cooch Behar Court. He was married to Radharai Barman. The couple had four sons and two daughters, and lived at Debibari in Cooch Behar. Prasenjit Barman died at the Maharaja Jitendra Narayan Medical College and Hospital in Cooch Behar on 22 December 2021, having been admitted to the hospital a few days earlier.
