= Girija Shankar Ray =

Indian politician in West Bengal

Member of the West Bengal Legislative Assembly
- Incumbent
- Assumed office 4 May 2026
- Preceded by: Mihir Goswami
- Constituency: Natabari

Personal details
- Party: Bharatiya Janata Party
- Spouse: Nani Roy Barman
- Children: Anirudha Ray; Ankush Ray
- Parent: Jamini Ray
- Education: University of North Bengal
- Occupation: Social Work; Farmer
- Profession: Politician

Girija Shankar Ray (Bengali: গিরিজা শংকর রায়) is an Indian politician from West Bengal. He is a member of West Bengal Legislative Assembly, from Natabari Assembly constituency. He is a member of Bharatiya Janata Party.

== Early life and education ==
Ray is from Cooch Behar district of West Bengal. He has done Graduation (Bachelor of Arts) from Cooch Behar College under University of North Bengal in the year 1994.

== Political career ==
He is a member of West Bengal Legislative Assembly, from Natabari Assembly constituency.

=== Electoral performance ===
West Bengal Legislative Assembly
Year	Constituency	Party	Votes	%	Opponent	Party	Votes	%	Margin	Result
2026	Natabari	BJP	1,26,911	54.53	Sailendra Nath Barma	AITC	92,298	39.66	34,613	Won

== See also ==
- 2026 West Bengal Legislative Assembly election
- List of chief ministers of West Bengal
- West Bengal Legislative Assembly
- 18th West Bengal Assembly
