= Debendra Nath Karjee =

Indian politician

Member of Parliament, Lok Sabha
- In office 1962–1963
- Constituency: Cooch Behar, West Bengal

Personal details
- Born: 3 March 1904 Nataba, Cooch Behar, British India
- Party: Forward Bloc

Debendra Nath Karjee is an Indian politician. He was elected from Cooch Behar, West Bengal to the Lok Sabha, lower house of the Parliament of India as a member of the Forward Bloc.
