= Nripendra Nath Roy =

Indian politician

Member of Parliament, Lok Sabha
- In office 2009-2014
- Preceded by: Hiten Barman
- Succeeded by: Renuka Sinha
- Constituency: Cooch Behar, West Bengal

Personal details
- Born: 21 March 1959 (age 67) Kayaterbari, Cooch Behar, West Bengal
- Party: Forward Bloc
- As of 14 August, 2012

Nripendra Nath Roy (born 21 March 1959) is an Indian Politician belonging to the Forward Bloc. He was elected to the Lok Sabha, lower house of the Parliament of India from Cooch Behar constituency of West Bengal in 2009.
