= Fazle Haque =

Indian politician

Minister of State for Home Ministry, Government of West Bengal
- In office 20 March 1972 – 30 April 1977
- Governor: Anthony Lancelot Dias
- Constituency: Sitai

Member of West Bengal Legislative Assembly
- In office 1967–1977, 1996–2001, 2006 – 2011
- Succeeded by: Dipak Sengupta
- Constituency: Sitai
- Preceded by: Nripenra Nath Roy
- Succeeded by: Nripenra Nath Roy
- Preceded by: Dipak Sengupta
- Succeeded by: Keshab Chandra Roy

Personal details
- Born: February 9, 1937 (age 89) Cooch Behar State
- Party: Indian National Congress
- Education: Scottish Church College; Medical College & Hospital, Calcutta

Mohammed Fazle Haque (born 9 February 1937) is an Indian politician and also was the past Minister of State for Home Ministry as well as Public Works in the government of West Bengal. He was also an MLA, elected from the Sitai constituency in the 2006 West Bengal legislative assembly election. He served 6 terms as an MLA.

== Early life and education ==
Haque was born on 9 February 1937 to a Bengali family of Muslim Nashya Shaikhs in the princely state of Cooch Behar. He is the son of Haji Hossain Ali Bepai and Javeda Bewa. Ali completed his education at the Dinhata High School and the Scottish Church College in Calcutta. He graduated with an MBBS from Medical College & Hospital, Calcutta.

== Personal life ==
Haque married Ayesha Haque, daughter of Abul Hossain Bepai. They have three sons and two daughters.

== Career ==
Haque is a medical practitioner (doctor) and a former president of the Okrabari Alabakhsh High School. He contested in the 1967 West Bengal Legislative Assembly election where he ran as an Indian National Congress candidate in the Sitai Assembly constituency. Haque subsequently joined the Committee on Subordinate Legislation, and from 2003 to 2006, served in the Committee on Privileges and the Standing Committee on Health and Family Welfare. He was re-elected from the same constituency at the 1969, 1971 and 1972 legislative assembly elections.

Haque contested in the 1982, 1987 and 1991 elections, but lost to Forward Bloc candidate Deepak Sengupta on all of these occasions. He was elected to the Sitai constituency for a fifth term at the 1996 West Bengal Legislative Assembly election, defeating Forward Bloc candidate Nripendra Nath Ray. He lost to Ray in the 2001 elections, but defeated him in the following elections in 2006 West Bengal Legislative Assembly election, where he completed his sixth term as MLA.
