= Mihir Goswami =

Indian politician

Deputy Leader of the Opposition in West Bengal
- In office 10 May 2021 – 9 May 2026
- Governor: Jagdeep Dhankhar; La. Ganesan (additional charge); C. V. Ananda Bose; R. N. Ravi
- Leader: Suvendu Adhikari
- Preceded by: Nepal Mahata
- Succeeded by: Ashima Patra; Nayna Bandyopadhyay

Member of the West Bengal Legislative Assembly
- In office 2 May 2021 – 4 May 2026
- Preceded by: Rabindra Nath Ghosh
- Succeeded by: Girija Shankar Ray
- Constituency: Natabari
- In office 1996–2001, 2016 – 2021
- Preceded by: Akshay Thakur
- Succeeded by: Nikhil Ranjan Dey
- Constituency: Cooch Behar Dakshin

Personal details
- Born: 9 February 1954 (age 72) Cooch Behar, West Bengal, India
- Party: Bharatiya Janata Party (2020–present)
- Other political affiliations: Trinamool Congress (1998–2020); Indian National Congress (1984–1998)
- Occupation: Politician

Mihir Goswami is an Indian politician from the state of West Bengal. He was a member of the West Bengal Legislative Assembly from 1996 to 2001 and 2016–2021, from the Cooch Behar Dakshin constituency. He was the chairman of North Bengal State Transport Corporation. He was a member of Trinamool Congress until 2020, when he joined the Bharatiya Janata Party. He currently represents the Natabari constituency.

== Political career ==
He was District Youth Congress President in undivided Congress (When Mamata Banerjee State Youth Congress President). He won the Cooch Behar Uttar (Vidhan Sabha constituency) seat in 1996 as an Indian National Congress candidate. Later, he joined the Trinamool Congress in 1998. Later, he won the same seat again in the 2016 (Cooch Behar Dakshin) West Bengal Legislative Assembly election.

Mihir Goswami was elected from the Natabari (Vidhan Sabha constituency) constituency in the 2021 West Bengal Legislative Assembly election as a BJP candidate. He resigned from the TMC and joined the Bharatiya Janata Party on 27 November 2020, having resigned his offices on 31 October.
