= Sabitri Barman =

Indian politician (born 1973)

Member of the West Bengal Legislative Assembly
- Incumbent
- Assumed office May 2026
- Preceded by: Baren Chandra Barman
- Constituency: Sitalkuchi

Personal details
- Party: Bharatiya Janata Party
- Profession: Politician

Sabitri Barman (born 1973) is an Indian politician from West Bengal. She is a Member of the Legislative Assembly from the Sitalkuchi Assembly constituency which is reserved for Scheduled Caste community, in Cooch Behar district representing the Bharatiya Janata Party.

== Early life and education ==
Barman is from Sitalkuchi, Cooch Behar district, West Bengal. She is the wife of Dinesh Barman. She studied at Bairatiguri High School, Dhupguri, Jalpaiguri and passed the Class 12 examinations conducted by West Bengal Council of Higher Secondary Education. She declared assets worth Rs.45 lakhs in her affidavit to the Election Commission of India.

== Career ==
Barman won the Sitalkuchi Assembly constituency representing the Bharatiya Janata Party in the 2026 West Bengal Legislative Assembly election. She polled 1,44,367 votes and defeated her nearest rival, Harihar Das of the All India Trinamool Congress, by a margin of 25,278 votes.

=== Electoral performance ===
West Bengal Legislative Assembly
Year	Constituency	Party	Votes	%	Opponent	Party	Votes	%	Margin	Result
2026	Sitalkuchi	BJP	144,367	51.59	Harihar Das	AITC	119,089	42.56	25,278	Won

== See also ==
- 2026 West Bengal Legislative Assembly election
- List of chief ministers of West Bengal
- West Bengal Legislative Assembly
