= Sukumar Ray (politician) =

Indian politician (born 1968)

Sukumar Roy

Member of the West Bengal Legislative Assembly
- Incumbent
- Assumed office 2 May 2021
- Preceded by: Nagendra Nath Roy
- Constituency: Cooch Behar Uttar

Personal details
- Party: BJP
- Profession: Politician

Sukumar Ray (born 1968) is an Indian politician from West Bengal. He is a two time member of the West Bengal Legislative Assembly from Cooch Behar Uttar Assembly constituency which is reserved for Scheduled Caste community in Cooch Behar district. He was elected in the 2016 West Bengal Legislative Assembly election representing the Bharatiya Janata Party.

== Early life ==
Ray is from Cooch Behar, West Bengal. He is the son of the late Purna Chandra Ray. He runs his own business. He studied till Class 8 at Patlakhawa High School and passed the examinations in 1987. He declared assets worth Rs.2 crore in his affidavit to the Election Commission of India.

== Career ==
Ray won the 2021 West Bengal Legislative Assembly election from Cooch Behar Uttar Assembly constituency representing the BJP. He polled 1,20,483 votes and defeated his nearest rival, Binay Krishna Barman of the All India Trinamool Congress by a margin of 14,615 votes. He retained the seat in the 2026 West Bengal Legislative Assembly election beating his nearest opponent, Partha Pratim Roy, also of the AITC. He polled 1,55,327 votes and won by a margin of 70,384 votes.
