= Rabindra Nath Ghosh =

Indian politician

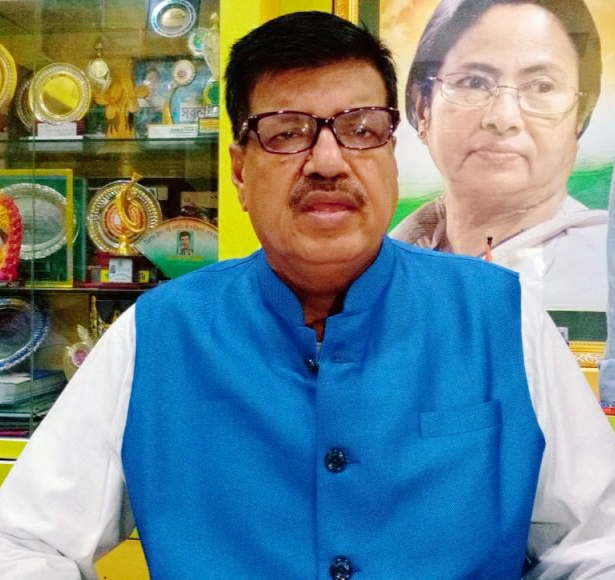

Chairman of Cooch Behar Municipality
- Incumbent
- Assumed office 17 March 2022
- Constituency: Ward no.8

Minister of North Bengal Development, Government of West Bengal
- In office 20 May 2016 – 2 May 2021
- Governor: Keshari Nath Tripathi; Jagdeep Dhankhar
- Chief Minister: Mamata Banerjee
- Preceded by: Goutam Deb
- Succeeded by: Sabina Yeasmin
- Constituency: Natabari

Member of West Bengal Legislative Assembly
- In office 13 May 2011 – 2 May 2021
- Preceded by: Tamser Ali
- Succeeded by: Mihir Goswami
- Constituency: Natabari

Personal details
- Party: All India Trinamool Congress
- Occupation: Politician

Rabindra Nath Ghosh is an Indian politician, and the chairman of Cooch Behar Municipality. He was one of the prominent leaders of All India Trinamool Congress, the ruling political party of West Bengal. He previously served as a Cabinet Minister of the Government of West Bengal from 2016 to 2021. Ghosh was also a two time MLA of West Bengal Legislative Assembly from 2011 to 2021.
