= Partha Pratim Roy =

Indian politician

Chairman of North Bengal State Transport Corporation
- Incumbent
- Assumed office 18 May 2021

Member of Parliament, Lok Sabha
- In office 2016–2019
- Preceded by: Renuka Sinha
- Succeeded by: Nisith Pramanik
- Constituency: Cooch Behar

Personal details
- Born: Cooch Behar, West Bengal
- Party: Trinamool Congress
- Profession: Teacher; Politician

Partha Pratim Roy is an Indian politician who currently serves as Chairman of North Bengal State Transport Corporation. He hails from the state of West Bengal. He is now the president of Cooch Behar District Trinamool Congress.

== Life ==
Partha Pratim Ray was born in the year 1981. He studied in Jenkins School, graduated in English from Dinhata College and post graduated in English from University of North Bengal. By profession he is an Assistant Teacher in B.C. High School since 2005. He is now one of the leading spokesmen of TMC. His father was associated with Indian National Congress and TMC for a decade. He came into politics in his young age and became All India Youth Trinamool Congress district president. In 2016, he was elected to Lok Sabha from Cooch Behar parliamentary constituency of West Bengal on TMC ticket in a by-election when the seat fell vacant due to the death of the sitting MP Renuka Sinha. He is former district president of TMC Cooch Behar district unit. He was a special officer under Department of Co-operative, Government of West Bengal. Currently, he is the chairman of NBSTC. He also was the chairman of Rogi Kalyan Samity of Maharaja Jitendra Narayan Medical College and Hospital in Cooch Behar.
