= List of Lok Sabha members from West Bengal =

This is the List of members of the Lok Sabha representing from West Bengal. These lower house members of the Indian Parliament were elected Indian general election.

Lok Sabha constituencies in West Bengal

== 18th Lok Sabha ==
This is a list of MPs elected in the 2024 Indian general election in West Bengal held in April–June 2024.

As of June 2026 after rebellion in AITC

2024 Election Result

Keys:

NDA (32)
- NCPI (20)
- BJP (12)
INDIA (9)
- MAITC (8)
- INC (1)
Vacant (1)

No.	Constituency	Name	Party
1	Cooch Behar (SC)	Jagadish Chandra Barma Basunia	NCPI
2	Alipurduars (ST)	Manoj Tigga	BJP
3	Jalpaiguri (SC)	Jayanta Kumar Roy	BJP
4	Darjeeling	Raju Bista	BJP
5	Raiganj	Kartick Chandra Paul	BJP
6	Balurghat	Sukanta Majumdar	BJP
7	Maldaha Uttar	Khagen Murmu	BJP
8	Maldaha Dakshin	Isha Khan Choudhury	INC
9	Jangipur	Khalilur Rahaman	NCPI
10	Baharampur	Yusuf Pathan	NCPI
11	Murshidabad	Abu Taher Khan	NCPI
12	Krishnanagar	Mahua Moitra	MAITC
13	Ranaghat (SC)	Jagannath Sarkar	BJP
14	Bangaon (SC)	Shantanu Thakur	BJP
15	Barrackpur	Partha Bhowmick	NCPI
16	Dum Dum	Saugata Roy	MAITC
17	Barasat	Kakoli Ghosh Dastidar	NCPI
18	Basirhat	Haji Nurul Islam (Died on 25 September 2024)	MAITC
18	Basirhat	Vacant	
19	Jaynagar (SC)	Pratima Mondal	MAITC
20	Mathurapur (SC)	Bapi Halder	NCPI
21	Diamond Harbour	Abhishek Banerjee	MAITC
22	Jadavpur	Saayoni Ghosh	NCPI
23	Kolkata Dakshin	Mala Roy	NCPI
24	Kolkata Uttar	Sudip Bandyopadhyay	NCPI
25	Howrah	Prasun Banerjee	NCPI
26	Uluberia	Sajda Ahmed	MAITC
27	Sreerampur	Kalyan Banerjee	MAITC
28	Hooghly	Rachana Banerjee	NCPI
29	Arambagh (SC)	Mitali Bag	NCPI
30	Tamluk	Abhijit Gangopadhyay	BJP
31	Kanthi	Soumendu Adhikari	BJP
32	Ghatal	Deepak Adhikari	NCPI
33	Jhargram (ST)	Kalipada Soren	NCPI
34	Medinipur	June Malia	NCPI
35	Purulia	Jyotirmay Singh Mahato	BJP
36	Bankura	Arup Chakraborty	NCPI
37	Bishnupur (SC)	Saumitra Khan	BJP
38	Bardhaman Purba (SC)	Sharmila Sarkar	NCPI
39	Bardhaman–Durgapur	Kirti Azad	MAITC
40	Asansol	Shatrughan Sinha	MAITC
41	Bolpur (SC)	Asit Kumar Mal	NCPI
42	Birbhum	Satabdi Roy	NCPI

== 17th Lok Sabha ==
List of members (17 June 2019 – 16 June 2024) representation in Lok Sabha. These members of the Lower house of the Indian Parliament were elected in the 2019 Indian general election held in April–May 2019.

Keys: AITC (22) BJP (18) INC (2)

No.	Constituency	Name	Party
1	Cooch Behar (SC)	Nisith Pramanik	BJP
2	Alipurduars (ST)	John Barla	BJP
3	Jalpaiguri (SC)	Jayanta Kumar Roy	BJP
4	Darjeeling	Raju Bista	BJP
5	Raiganj	Debasree Chaudhuri	BJP
6	Balurghat	Sukanta Majumdar	BJP
7	Maldaha Uttar	Khagen Murmu	BJP
8	Maldaha Dakshin	Abu Hasem Khan Choudhury	INC
9	Jangipur	Khalilur Rahaman	AITC
10	Berhampore	Adhir Ranjan Chowdhury	INC
11	Murshidabad	Abu Taher Khan	AITC
12	Krishnanagar	Mahua Moitra	AITC
13	Ranaghat (SC)	Jagannath Sarkar	BJP
14	Bangaon (SC)	Shantanu Thakur	BJP
15	Barrackpur	Arjun Singh	BJP
16	Dum Dum	Saugata Roy	AITC
17	Barasat	Kakoli Ghosh Dastidar	AITC
18	Basirhat	Nusrat Jahan	AITC
19	Jaynagar (SC)	Pratima Mondal	AITC
20	Mathurapur (SC)	Choudhury Mohan Jatua	AITC
21	Diamond Harbour	Abhishek Banerjee	AITC
22	Jadavpur	Mimi Chakraborty	AITC
23	Kolkata Dakshin	Mala Roy	AITC
24	Kolkata Uttar	Sudip Bandyopadhyay	AITC
25	Howrah	Prasun Banerjee	AITC
26	Uluberia	Sajda Ahmed	AITC
27	Srerampur	Kalyan Banerjee	AITC
28	Hooghly	Locket Chatterjee	BJP
29	Arambagh (SC)	Aparupa Poddar (Afrin Ali)	AITC
30	Tamluk	Dibyendu Adhikari	AITC
31	Kanthi	Sisir Adhikari	AITC
32	Ghatal	Deepak Adhikari	AITC
33	Jhargram (ST)	Kunar Hembram	BJP
34	Medinipur	Dilip Ghosh	BJP
35	Purulia	Jyotirmay Singh Mahato	BJP
36	Bankura	Subhash Sarkar	BJP
37	Bishnupur (SC)	Saumitra Khan	BJP
38	Bardhaman Purba (SC)	Sunil Kumar Mandal	AITC
39	Bardhaman–Durgapur	S. S. Ahluwalia	BJP
40	Asansol	Babul Supriyo (Resigned on 22 October 2021)	BJP
40	Asansol	Shatrughan Sinha (Elected on 16 April 2022)	AITC
41	Bolpur (SC)	Asit Kumar Mal	AITC
42	Birbhum	Satabdi Roy	AITC

== 16th Lok Sabha ==
Keys: AITC (33) INC (4) BJP (2) CPI(M) (2) Vacant (1)

No.	Constituency	Name of elected M.P.	Party affiliation
1	Cooch Behar (SC)	Renuka Sinha (Died on 17 August 2016)	All India Trinamool Congress
1	Cooch Behar (SC)	Parthapratim Roy (Elected on 22 November 2016)	All India Trinamool Congress
2	Alipurduars (ST)	Dasrath Tirkey	All India Trinamool Congress
3	Jalpaiguri (SC)	Bijoy Chandra Barman	All India Trinamool Congress
4	Darjeeling	S. S. Ahluwalia	Bharatiya Janata Party
5	Raiganj	Mohammed Salim	Communist Party of India (Marxist)
6	Balurghat	Arpita Ghosh	All India Trinamool Congress
7	Maldaha Uttar	Mausam Noor	Indian National Congress
8	Maldaha Dakshin	Abu Hasem Khan Choudhury	Indian National Congress
9	Jangipur	Abhijit Mukherjee	Indian National Congress
10	Baharampur	Adhir Ranjan Chowdhury	Indian National Congress
11	Murshidabad	Badaruddoza Khan	Communist Party of India (Marxist)
12	Krishnanagar	Tapas Paul	All India Trinamool Congress
13	Ranaghat (SC)	Tapas Mandal	All India Trinamool Congress
14	Bangaon (SC)	Kapil Krishna Thakur (Died on 13 October 2014)	All India Trinamool Congress
14	Bangaon (SC)	Mamata Thakur (Elected on 16 February 2015)	All India Trinamool Congress
15	Barrackpore	Dinesh Trivedi	All India Trinamool Congress
16	Dum Dum	Saugata Roy	All India Trinamool Congress
17	Barasat	Kakali Ghoshdostidar	All India Trinamool Congress
18	Basirhat (SC)	Idris Ali	All India Trinamool Congress
19	Jaynagar (SC)	Pratima Mondal	All India Trinamool Congress
20	Mathurapur	Choudhury Mohan Jatua	All India Trinamool Congress
21	Diamond Harbour	Abhishek Banerjee	All India Trinamool Congress
22	Jadavpur	Sugata Bose (Resigned on 12 March 2019)	All India Trinamool Congress
22	Jadavpur	Vacant	
23	Kolkata Dakshin	Subrata Bakshi	All India Trinamool Congress
24	Kolkata Uttar	Sudip Bandyopadhyay	All India Trinamool Congress
25	Howrah	Prasun Banerjee	All India Trinamool Congress
26	Uluberia	Sultan Ahmed (Died on 4 September 2017)	All India Trinamool Congress
26	Uluberia	Sajda Ahmed (Elected on 1 February 2018)	All India Trinamool Congress
27	Srerampur	Kalyan Banerjee	All India Trinamool Congress
28	Hooghly	Ratna De (Nag)	All India Trinamool Congress
29	Arambagh (SC)	Afrin Ali	All India Trinamool Congress
30	Tamluk	Suvendu Adhikari (Resigned on 19 May 2016)	All India Trinamool Congress
30	Tamluk	Dibyendu Adhikari (Elected on 22 November 2016)	All India Trinamool Congress
31	Kanthi	Sisir Adhikari	All India Trinamool Congress
32	Ghatal	Deepak Adhikari (Dev)	All India Trinamool Congress
33	Jhargram (ST)	Uma Saren	All India Trinamool Congress
34	Medinipur	Sandhya Roy	All India Trinamool Congress
35	Purulia	Mriganka Mahato	All India Trinamool Congress
36	Bankura	Moon Moon Sen	All India Trinamool Congress
37	Bishnupur (SC)	Saumitra Khan	All India Trinamool Congress
38	Bardhaman Purba (ST)	Sunil Kumar Mandal	All India Trinamool Congress
39	Bardhaman–Durgapur	Mamtaz Sanghamita	All India Trinamool Congress
40	Asansol	Babul Supriyo	Bharatiya Janata Party
41	Bolpur (SC)	Anupam Hazra	All India Trinamool Congress
42	Birbhum	Satabdi Roy	All India Trinamool Congress

== 15th Lok Sabha ==
Keys: AITC (18) CPI(M) (9) INC (6) CPI (2) AIFB (2) RSP (2) BJP (1) SUCI(C) (1) Vacant (1)

No.	Constituency	Name of elected M.P.	Party affiliation
1	Cooch Behar	Nripendra Nath Roy	All India Forward Bloc
2	Alipurduars	Manohar Tirkey	Revolutionary Socialist Party
3	Jalpaiguri	Mahendra Kumar Roy	Communist Party of India (Marxist)
4	Darjeeling	Jaswant Singh	Bharatiya Janata Party
5	Raiganj	Deepa Dasmunsi	Indian National Congress
6	Balurghat	Prasanta Kumar Majumdar	Revolutionary Socialist Party
7	Maldaha Uttar	Mausam Noor	Indian National Congress
8	Maldaha Dakshin	Abu Hasem Khan Choudhury	Indian National Congress
9	Jangipur	Pranab Mukherjee (Ceased to become a M.P. upon elected as a president on 25 7.2012)	Indian National Congress
9	Jangipur	Abhijit Mukherjee (Elected on 13 October 2012)	Indian National Congress
10	Baharampur	Adhir Ranjan Chowdhury	Indian National Congress
11	Murshidabad	Abdul Mannan Hossain	Indian National Congress
12	Krishnanagar	Tapas Paul	All India Trinamool Congress
13	Ranaghat	Sucharu Ranjan Haldar	All India Trinamool Congress
14	Bangaon	Gobinda Chandra Naskar	All India Trinamool Congress
15	Barrackpore	Dinesh Trivedi	All India Trinamool Congress
16	Dum Dum	Saugata Roy	All India Trinamool Congress
17	Barasat	Kakali Ghosh Dastidar	All India Trinamool Congress
18	Basirhat	Haji Nurul Islam	All India Trinamool Congress
19	Jaynagar	Tarun Mondal	Socialist Unity Centre of India (Communist)
20	Mathurapur	Choudhury Mohan Jatua	All India Trinamool Congress
21	Diamond Harbour	Somen Mitra (Resigned on 28 January 2014)	All India Trinamool Congress
21	Diamond Harbour	Vacant	
22	Jadavpur	Kabir Suman	All India Trinamool Congress
23	Kolkata Dakshin	Mamata Banerjee (Resigned on 9 October 2011)	All India Trinamool Congress
23	Kolkata Dakshin	Subrata Bakshi (Elected on 4 December 2011)	All India Trinamool Congress
24	Kolkata Uttar	Sudip Bandyopadhyay	All India Trinamool Congress
25	Howrah	Ambica Banerjee (Died on 25 April 2013)	All India Trinamool Congress
25	Howrah	Prasun Banerjee (Elected on 5 June 2013)	All India Trinamool Congress
26	Uluberia	Sultan Ahmed	All India Trinamool Congress
27	Sreerampur	Kalyan Banerjee	All India Trinamool Congress
28	Hooghly	Ratna De (Nag)	All India Trinamool Congress
29	Arambagh	Sakti Mohan Malik	Communist Party of India (Marxist)
30	Tamluk	Suvendu Adhikari	All India Trinamool Congress
31	Kanthi	Sisir Adhikari	All India Trinamool Congress
32	Ghatal	Gurudas Dasgupta	Communist Party of India
33	Jhargram	Pulin Bihari Baske	Communist Party of India (Marxist)
34	Medinipur	Prabodh Panda	Communist Party of India
35	Purulia	Narahari Mahato	All India Forward Bloc
36	Bankura	Acharia Basudeb	Communist Party of India (Marxist)
37	Bishnupur	Susmita Bauri	Communist Party of India (Marxist)
38	Bardhaman Purba	Anup Kumar Saha	Communist Party of India (Marxist)
39	Burdwan-Durgapur	Prof. S. K. Saidul Haque	Communist Party of India (Marxist)
40	Asansol	Bansa Gopal Chowdhury	Communist Party of India (Marxist)
41	Bolpur	Ram Chandra Dome	Communist Party of India (Marxist)
42	Birbhum	Satabdi Roy	All India Trinamool Congress

== 14th Lok Sabha ==
Keys: CPI(M) (26) INC (6) CPI (3) AIFB (3) RSP (3) AITC (1)

No.	Constituency	Name of elected M.P.	Party affiliation
1	Cooch Behar	Hiten Barman	All India Forward Bloc
2	Alipurduars	Joachim Baxla	Revolutionary Socialist Party
3	Jalpaiguri	Minati Sen	Communist Party of India (Marxist)
4	Darjeeling	Dawa Narbula	Indian National Congress
5	Raiganj	Priya Ranjan Dasmunsi	Indian National Congress
6	Balurghat	Ranen Barman	Revolutionary Socialist Party
7	Malda	A. B. A. Ghani Khan Choudhury (Died on 14.4.2006)	Indian National Congress
7	Malda	Abu Hasem Khan Choudhury (Elected on 19.9.2006)	Indian National Congress
8	Jangipur	Pranab Mukherjee	Indian National Congress
9	Murshidabad	Abdul Mannan Hossain	Indian National Congress
10	Behrampore	Adhir Ranjan Chowdhury	Indian National Congress
11	Krishnanagar	Jyotirmoyee Sikdar	Communist Party of India (Marxist)
12	Nabadwip	Alakesh Das	Communist Party of India (Marxist)
13	Barasat	Subrata Bose	All India Forward Bloc
14	Basirhat	Ajay Chakraborty	Communist Party of India
15	Jaynagar	Sanat Kumar Mandal	Revolutionary Socialist Party
16	Mathurapur	Basudeb Barman	Communist Party of India (Marxist)
17	Diamond Harbour	Samik Lahiri	Communist Party of India (Marxist)
18	Jadavpur	Sujan Chakraborty	Communist Party of India (Marxist)
19	Barrackpore	Tarit Baran Topdar	Communist Party of India (Marxist)
20	Dum Dum	Amitava Nandy	Communist Party of India (Marxist)
21	Calcutta North West	Sudhangshu Seal	Communist Party of India (Marxist)
22	Calcutta North East	Mohammed Salim	Communist Party of India (Marxist)
23	Calcutta South	Mamata Banerjee	All India Trinamool Congress
24	Howrah	Swadesh Chakrabortty	Communist Party of India (Marxist)
25	Uluberia	Hannan Mollah	Communist Party of India (Marxist)
26	Serampore	Santasri Chatterjee	Communist Party of India (Marxist)
27	Hooghly	Rupchand Pal	Communist Party of India (Marxist)
28	Arambagh	Anil Basu	Communist Party of India (Marxist)
29	Panskura	Gurudas Dasgupta	Communist Party of India
30	Tamluk	Lakshman Chandra Seth	Communist Party of India (Marxist)
31	Contai	Prasanta Pradhan	Communist Party of India (Marxist)
32	Midnapore	Prabodh Panda	Communist Party of India
33	Jhargram	Rupchand Murmu	Communist Party of India (Marxist)
34	Purulia	Bir Singh Mahato (Resigned on 30.5.2006)	All India Forward Bloc
34	Purulia	Narahari Mahato (Elected on 19.9.2006)	All India Forward Bloc
35	Bankura	Acharia Basudeb	Communist Party of India (Marxist)
36	Vishnupur	Susmita Bauri	Communist Party of India (Marxist)
37	Durgapur	Sunil Khan	Communist Party of India (Marxist)
38	Asansol	Bikash Chowdhury (Died on 1.8.2005)	Communist Party of India (Marxist)
38	Asansol	Bansa Gopal Chowdhury (Elected on 4.10.2005)	Communist Party of India (Marxist)
39	Burdwan	Nikhilananda Sar	Communist Party of India (Marxist)
40	Katwa	Mahboob Zahedi (Died on 8.4.2006)	Communist Party of India (Marxist)
40	Katwa	Abu Ayesh Mondal (Elected on 19.9.2006)	Communist Party of India (Marxist)
41	Bolpur	Somnath Chatterjee	Communist Party of India (Marxist)
42	Birbhum	Ram Chandra Dome	Communist Party of India (Marxist)

== 13th Lok Sabha ==
Keys: CPI(M) (21) AITC (8) INC (3) CPI (3) RSP (3) BJP (2) AIFB (2)

No.	Constituency	Name of elected M.P.	Party affiliation
1	Cooch Behar (SC)	Amar Roy Pradhan	All India Forward Bloc
2	Alipurduars (ST)	Joachim Baxla	Revolutionary Socialist Party
3	Jalpaiguri	Minati Sen	Communist Party of India (Marxist)
4	Darjeeling	S P Lepcha	Communist Party of India (Marxist)
5	Raiganj	Priya Ranjan Dasmunsi	Indian National Congress
6	Balurghat (SC)	Ranen Barman	Revolutionary Socialist Party
7	Malda	A. B. A. Ghani Khan Choudhury	Indian National Congress
8	Jangipur	Abul Hasnat Khan	Communist Party of India (Marxist)
9	Murshidabad	Moinul Hassan	Communist Party of India (Marxist)
10	Behrampore	Adhir Ranjan Chowdhury	Indian National Congress
11	Krishnanagar	Satyabrata Mookherjee	Bharatiya Janata Party
12	Nabadwip (SC)	Anand Mohan Biswas	All India Trinamool Congress
13	Barasat	Dr. Ranjit Kumar Panja	All India Trinamool Congress
14	Basirhat	Ajay Chakraborty	Communist Party of India
15	Jaynagar (SC)	Sanat Kumar Mandal	Revolutionary Socialist Party
16	Mathurapur (SC)	Radhika Ranjan Pramanik	Communist Party of India (Marxist)
17	Diamond Harbour	Samik Lahiri	Communist Party of India (Marxist)
18	Jadavpur	Krishna Bose	All India Trinamool Congress
19	Barrackpore	Tarit Baran Topdar	Communist Party of India (Marxist)
20	Dum Dum	Tapan Sikdar	Bharatiya Janata Party
21	Calcutta North West	Sudip Bandyopadhyay	All India Trinamool Congress
22	Calcutta North East	Ajit Kumar Panja	All India Trinamool Congress
23	Calcutta South	Mamata Banerjee	All India Trinamool Congress
24	Howrah	Swadesh Chakrabortty	Communist Party of India (Marxist)
25	Uluberia	Hannan Mollah	Communist Party of India (Marxist)
26	Serampore	Akbor Ali Khandoker	All India Trinamool Congress
27	Hooghly	Rupchand Pal	Communist Party of India (Marxist)
28	Arambagh	Anil Basu	Communist Party of India (Marxist)
29	Panskura	Geeta Mukherjee	Communist Party of India
30	Tamluk	Seth Lakshman Chandra	Communist Party of India (Marxist)
31	Contai	Nitish Sengupta	All India Trinamool Congress
32	Midnapore	Indrajit Gupta	Communist Party of India
33	Jhargram (ST)	Rupchand Murmu	Communist Party of India (Marxist)
34	Purulia	Bir Singh Mahato	All India Forward Bloc
35	Bankura	Acharia Basudeb	Communist Party of India (Marxist)
36	Vishnupur (SC)	Sandhya Bauri	Communist Party of India (Marxist)
37	Durgapur (SC)	Sunil Khan	Communist Party of India (Marxist)
38	Asansol	Bikash Chowdhury	Communist Party of India (Marxist)
39	Burdwan	Nikhilananda Sar	Communist Party of India (Marxist)
40	Katwa	Mahboob Zahedi	Communist Party of India (Marxist)
41	Bolpur	Somnath Chatterjee	Communist Party of India (Marxist)
42	Birbhum (SC)	Ram Chandra Dome	Communist Party of India (Marxist)

== 12th Lok Sabha ==
Key:
AITC (6)	CPIM (21)	BJP (1)	OTHERS (14)

Constituency	Member	Party
Alipurduars (ST)	Joachim Baxla	Revolutionary Socialist Party
Arambagh (SC)	Anil Basu	Communist Party of India (Marxist)
Asansol	Bikash Chowdhury	Communist Party of India (Marxist)
Balurghat (SC)	Ranen Barman	Revolutionary Socialist Party
Bankura	Basudeb Acharia	Communist Party of India (Marxist)
Barasat	Dr. Ranjit Kumar Panja	All India Trinamool Congress
Barrackpore	Tarit Baran Topdar	Communist Party of India (Marxist)
Basirhat	Ajay Chakraborty	Communist Party of India
Berhampore	Pramothes Mukherjee	Revolutionary Socialist Party
Bolpur (SC)	Ram Chandra Dome	Communist Party of India (Marxist)
Bolpur (SC)	Somnath Chatterjee	
Burdwan	Nikhilananda Sar	Communist Party of India (Marxist)
Calcutta North East	Ajit Kumar Panja	All India Trinamool Congress
Contai	Prof. Sudhir Kumar Giri	Communist Party of India (Marxist)
Coochbehar (SC)	Amar Roy Pradhan	All India Forward Bloc
Darjeeling	Ananda Pathak	Communist Party of India (Marxist)
Diamond Harbour	Samik Lahiri	Communist Party of India (Marxist)
Dum Dum	Tapan Sikdar	Bharatiya Janata Party
Durgapur (SC)	Sunil Khan	Communist Party of India (Marxist)
Hooghly	Rupchand Pal	Communist Party of India (Marxist)
Jadavpur	Prof. Krishna Bose	All India Trinamool Congress
Jalpaiguri (SC)	Minati Sen	Communist Party of India (Marxist)
Jangipur	Abul Hasnat Khan	Communist Party of India (Marxist)
Jaynagar (SC)	Sanat Kumar Mandal	Revolutionary Socialist Party
Jhargram (ST)	Rupchand Murmu	Communist Party of India (Marxist)
Katwa	Mahboob Zahedi	Communist Party of India (Marxist)
Kolkata Uttar	Sudip Bandyopadhyay	All India Trinamool Congress
Krishnagar	Ajoy Mukhopadhyay	Communist Party of India (Marxist)
Malda	A.B.A. Ghani Khan Choudhury	Indian National Congress
Mathurapur (SC)	Prof. Radhika Ranjan Pramanik	Communist Party of India (Marxist)
Midnapore	Indrajit Gupta	Communist Party of India
Murshidabad	Moinul Hassan Ahamed	Communist Party of India (Marxist)
Nabadwip (SC)	Dr. Asim Bala	Communist Party of India (Marxist)
Panskura	Dr. Bikram Sarkar	All India Trinamool Congress
Panskura	Geeta Mukherjee	Communist Party of India
Purulia	Bir Sing Mahato	All India Forward Bloc
Raiganj	Subrata Mukherjee	Communist Party of India (Marxist)
Serampore	Akbor Ali Khandoker	All India Trinamool Congress
Tamluk	Lakshman Chandra Seth	Communist Party of India (Marxist)
Uluberia	Hannan Mollah	Communist Party of India (Marxist)
Vishnupur (SC)	Sandhya Bauri	Communist Party of India (Marxist)

== 11th Lok Sabha ==
Constituency	Member	Party
Alipurduars (ST)	Joachim Baxla	Revolutionary Socialist Party
Arambagh (SC)	Anil Basu	Communist Party of India (Marxist)
Asansol	Haradhan Roy	Communist Party of India (Marxist)
Balurghat (SC)	Ranen Barman	Revolutionary Socialist Party
Bankura	Basudeb Acharia	Communist Party of India (Marxist)
Barasat	Chitta Basu (politician)	All India Forward Bloc
Barrackpore	Tarit Baran Topdar	Communist Party of India (Marxist)
Basirhat	Ajay Chakraborty	Communist Party of India
Berhampore	Pramothes Mukherjee	Revolutionary Socialist Party
Bolpur (SC)	Somnath Chatterjee	Communist Party of India (Marxist)
Burdwan	Balai Ray	Communist Party of India (Marxist)
Calcutta North East	Ajit Kumar Panja	Indian National Congress
Calcutta North West	Dr. Debiprosad Pal	Indian National Congress
Contai	Prof. Sudhir Kumar Giri	Communist Party of India (Marxist)
Coochbehar (SC)	Amar Roy Pradhan	All India Forward Bloc
Darjeeling	Ratna Bahadur Rai	Communist Party of India (Marxist)
Diamond Harbour	Samik Lahiri	Communist Party of India (Marxist)
Dumdum	Nirmal Kanti Chatterjee	Communist Party of India (Marxist)
Durgapur (SC)	Sunil Khan	Communist Party of India (Marxist)
Hooghly	Rupchand Pal	Communist Party of India (Marxist)
Jadavpur	Prof. Krishna Bose	Indian National Congress
Jalpaiguri	Jitendra Nath Das	Communist Party of India (Marxist)
Jangipur	Mohammad Idris Ali	Indian National Congress
Jaynagar (SC)	Sanat Kumar Mandal	Revolutionary Socialist Party
Jhargram (ST)	Rupchand Murmu	Communist Party of India (Marxist)
Katwa	Mahboob Zahedi	Communist Party of India (Marxist)
Krishnagar	Ajoy Mukhopadhyay	Communist Party of India (Marxist)
Malda	A.B.A. Ghani Khan Choudhury	Indian National Congress
Mathurapur (SC)	Prof. Radhika Ranjan Pramanik	Communist Party of India (Marxist)
Midnapore	Indrajit Gupta	Communist Party of India
Murshidabad	Syed Masudal Hossain	Communist Party of India (Marxist)
Nabadwip (SC)	Dr. Asim Bala	Communist Party of India (Marxist)
Panskura	Geeta Mukherjee	Communist Party of India
Purulia	Bir Sing Mahato	All India Forward Bloc
Raiganj	Subrata Mukherjee	Communist Party of India (Marxist)
Serampore	Pradip Bhattacharya	Indian National Congress
Tamluk	Jayanta Bhattacharya	Indian National Congress
Uluberia	Hannan Mollah	Communist Party of India (Marxist)
Vishnupur (SC)	Sandhya Bauri	Communist Party of India (Marxist)

== 10th Lok Sabha ==
Constituency	Member	Party
Alipurduars (ST)	Pius Tirkey	Revolutionary Socialist Party
Arambagh (SC)	Anil Basu	Communist Party of India (Marxist)
Asansol	Haradhan Roy	Communist Party of India (Marxist)
Balurghat (SC)	Palas Barman	Revolutionary Socialist Party
Bankura	Basudeb Acharia	Communist Party of India (Marxist)
Barasat	Chitta Basu (politician)	All India Forward Bloc
Barrackpore	Tarit Baran Topdar	Communist Party of India (Marxist)
Basirhat	Manoranjan Sur	Communist Party of India
Berhampore	Nani Bhattacharya	Revolutionary Socialist Party
Berhampore	Pramothes Mukherjee	Revolutionary Socialist Party
Bolpur (SC)	Ram Chandra Dome	Communist Party of India (Marxist)
Bolpur (SC)	Somnath Chatterjee	
Burdwan	Dr. Sudhir Ray	Communist Party of India (Marxist)
Calcutta North East	Ajit Kumar Panja	Indian national Congress
Calcutta North West	Dr. Debiprosad Pal	Indian National Congress
Contai	Sudhir Kumar Giri	Communist Party of India (Marxist)
Coochbehar (SC)	Amar Roy Pradhan	All India Forward Bloc
Darjeeling	Inder Jit	Indian National Congress (I)
Darjeeling	Jaswant Singh	Bharatiya Janata Party
Diamond Harbour	Amal Datta	Communist Party of India (Marxist)
Dumdum	Nirmal Kanti Chatterjee	Communist Party of India (Marxist)
Durgapur (SC)	Purna Chandra Malik	Communist Party of India (Marxist)
Hooghly	Rupchand Pal	Communist Party of India (Marxist)
Howrah	Susanta Chakraborty	Communist Party of India (Marxist)
Jadavpur	Malini Bhattacharya	Communist Party of India (Marxist)
Jalpaiguri	Jitendra Nath Das	Communist Party of India (Marxist)
Jangipur	Abedin Zainal	Communist Party of India (Marxist)
Jaynagar (SC)	Sanat Kumar Mandal	Revolutionary Socialist Party
Jhargram (ST)	Rupchand Murmu	Communist Party of India (Marxist)
Katwa	Saifuddin Choudhury	Communist Party of India (Marxist)
Krishnagar	Ajoy Mukhopadhyay	Communist Party of India (Marxist)
Malda	A.B.A. Ghani Khan Choudhury	Indian National Congress
Mathurapur (SC)	Radhika Ranjan Pramanik	Communist Party of India (Marxist)
Midnapore	Indrajit Gupta	Communist Party of India
Murshidabad	Syed Masudal Hossain	Communist Party of India (Marxist)
Nabadwip (SC)	Dr. Asim Bala	Communist Party of India (Marxist)
Panskura	Geeta Mukherjee	Communist Party of India
Purulia	Bir Sing Mahato	All India Forward Bloc
Purulia	Chitta Ranjan Mahata	Forward Bloc (Marxist)
Raiganj	Subrata Mukherjee	Communist Party of India (Marxist)
Serampore	Sudarsan Raychaudhuri	Communist Party of India (Marxist)
Tamluk	Satyagopal Misra	Communist Party of India (Marxist)
Uluberia	Hannan Mollah	Communist Party of India (Marxist)
Vishnupur (SC)	Sukhendu Khan	Communist Party of India (Marxist)

== 9th Lok Sabha ==
Constituency	Member	Party
Alipurduars (ST)	Pius Tirkey	Revolutionary Socialist Party
Arambagh (SC)	Anil Basu	Communist Party of India (Marxist)
Asansol	Haradhan Roy	Communist Party of India (Marxist)
Balurghat (SC)	Palas Barman	Revolutionary Socialist Party
Bankura	Basudeb Acharia	Communist Party of India (Marxist)
Barasat	Chitta Basu (politician)	All India Forward Bloc
Barrackpore	Tarit Baran Topdar	Communist Party of India (Marxist)
Basirhat	Manoranjan Sur	Communist Party of India
Berhampore	Nani Bhattacharya	Revolutionary Socialist Party
Bolpur (SC)	Ram Chandra Dome	Communist Party of India (Marxist)
Bolpur (SC)	Somnath Chatterjee	
Burdwan	Dr. Sudhir Ray	Communist Party of India (Marxist)
Calcutta North East	Ajit Kumar Panja	All India Trinamool Congress
Calcutta North West	Dr. Debiprosad Pal	Indian National Congress
Calcutta South	Dr. Biplab Dasgupta	Communist Party of India (Marxist)
Contai	Prof. Sudhir Kumar Giri	Communist Party of India (Marxist)
Coochbehar (SC)	Amar Roy Pradhan	All India Forward Bloc
Darjeeling	Inder Jit	Indian National Congress (I)
Darjeeling	Jaswant Singh	Bharatiya Janata Party
Diamond Harbour	Amal Datta	Communist Party of India (Marxist)
Dumdum	Nirmal Kanti Chatterjee	Communist Party of India (Marxist)
Durgapur (SC)	Purna Chandra Malik	Communist Party of India (Marxist)
Hooghly	Rupchand Pal	Communist Party of India (Marxist)
Howrah	Susanta Chakraborty	Communist Party of India (Marxist)
Jadavpur	Prof. Malini Bhattacharya	Communist Party of India (Marxist)
Jalpaiguri	Manik Sanyal	Communist Party of India (Marxist)
Jangipur	Abedin Zainal	Communist Party of India (Marxist)
Jaynagar (SC)	Sanat Kumar Mandal	Revolutionary Socialist Party
Jhargram (ST)	Matilal Hansda	Communist Party of India (Marxist)
Katwa	Saifuddin Choudhury	Communist Party of India (Marxist)
Krishnagar	Ajoy Mukhopadhyay	Communist Party of India (Marxist)
Malda	A.B.A. Ghani Khan Choudhury	Indian National Congress
Mathurapur (SC)	Prof. Radhika Ranjan Pramanik	Communist Party of India (Marxist)
Midnapore	Indrajit Gupta	Communist Party of India
Murshidabad	Syed Masudal Hossain	Communist Party of India (Marxist)
Nabadwip (SC)	Dr. Asim Bala	Communist Party of India (Marxist)
Panskura	Geeta Mukherjee	Communist Party of India
Purulia	Chitta Ranjan Mahata	Forward Bloc (Marxist)
Raiganj	Dr. Golam Yazdani	Indian National Congress (I)
Serampore	Prof. Sudarsan Raychaudhuri	Communist Party of India (Marxist)
Tamluk	Satyagopal Misra	Communist Party of India (Marxist)
Uluberia	Hannan Mollah	Communist Party of India (Marxist)
Vishnupur (SC)	Sukhendu Khan	Communist Party of India (Marxist)

== 8th Lok Sabha ==
Constituency	Member	Party
Alipurduars (ST)	Pius Tirkey	Revolutionary Socialist Party
Arambagh (SC)	Anil Basu	Communist Party of India (Marxist)
Asansol	Ananda Gopal Mukhopadhyay	Indian National Congress (I)
Balurghat (SC)	Palas Barman	Revolutionary Socialist Party
Bankura	Basudeb Acharia	Communist Party of India (Marxist)
Barasat	Tarun Kanti Ghosh	Indian National Congress (I)
Barrackpore	Debi Ghosal	Indian National Congress (I)
Berhampore	Atish Chandra Sinha	Indian National Congress (I)
Birbhum (SC)	Gadadhar Saha	Communist Party of India (Marxist)
Bolpur (SC)	Somnath Chatterjee	
Bolpur	Dr. Saradish Roy	Communist Party of India (Marxist)
Burdwan	Dr. Sudhir Ray	Communist Party of India (Marxist)
Calcutta North East	Ajit Kumar Panja	All India Trinamool Congress
Calcutta North West	Ashok Kumar Sen	Indian National Congress (I)
Calcutta South	Bhola Nath Sen	Indian National Congress (I)
Contai	Phulrenu Guha	Indian National Congress (I)
Coochbehar (SC)	Amar Roy Pradhan	All India Forward Bloc
Darjeeling	Ananda Pathak	Communist Party of India (Marxist)
Diamond Harbour	Amal Datta	Communist Party of India (Marxist)
Dumdum	Asutosh Law	Indian National Congress (I)
Durgapur (SC)	Purna Chandra Malik	Communist Party of India (Marxist)
Hooghly	Indumati Bhattacharyya	Indian National Congress (I)
Jalpaiguri	Manik Sanyal	Communist Party of India (Marxist)
Jangipur	Abedin Zainal	Communist Party of India (Marxist)
Jaynagar (SC)	Sanat Kumar Mandal	Revolutionary Socialist Party
Jhargram (ST)	Matilal Hansda	Communist Party of India (Marxist)
Katwa	Saifuddin Choudhury	Communist Party of India (Marxist)
Krishnagar	Renu Pada Das	Communist Party of India (Marxist)
Malda	A.B.A. Ghani Khan Choudhury	Indian National Congress
Mathurapur (SC)	Prof. Manoranjan Halder	Indian National Congress (I)
Midnapore	Narayan Choubey	Communist Party of India
Midnapore	Indrajit Gupta	Communist Party of India
Murshidabad	Syed Masudal Hossain	Communist Party of India (Marxist)
Nabadwip (SC)	Bibha Ghosh Goswami	Communist Party of India (Marxist)
Panskura	Geeta Mukherjee	Communist Party of India
Purulia	Chitta Ranjan Mahata	Forward Bloc (Marxist)
Raiganj	Dr. Golam Yazdani	Indian National Congress (I)
Raiganj	Priya Ranjan Dasmunsi	Indian National Congress
Serampore	Bimal Kanti Ghosh	Indian National Congress (I)
Tamluk	Satyagopal Misra	Communist Party of India (Marxist)
Uluberia	Hannan Mollah	Communist Party of India (Marxist)
Vishnupur (SC)	Ajit Kumar Saha	Communist Party of India (Marxist)

== 7th Lok Sabha ==
Constituency	Member	Party
Alipurduars (ST)	Pius Tirkey	Revolutionary Socialist Party
Asansol	Ananda Gopal Mukhopadhyay	Indian National Congress (I)
Azambagh	Bijoy Krishna Modak	Communist Party of India (Marxist)
Balurghat (SC)	Palas Barman	Revolutionary Socialist Party
Bankura	Basudeb Acharia	Communist Party of India (Marxist)
Barasat	Chitta Basu (politician)	All India Forward Bloc
Barrackpore	Mohammed Ismail	Communist Party of India (Marxist)
Berhampore	Tridib Chaudhuri	Revolutionary Socialist Party
Birbhum (SC)	Gadadhar Saha	Communist Party of India (Marxist)
Bolpur	Dr. Saradish Roy	Communist Party of India (Marxist)
Burdwan	Sushil Kumar Bhattacharya	Communist Party of India (Marxist)
Calcutta North East	Sunil Maitra	Communist Party of India (Marxist)
Calcutta North West	Ashok Kumar Sen	Indian National Congress (I)
Calcutta South	Satyasadhan Chakraborty	Communist Party of India (Marxist)
Contai	Prof. Sudhir Kumar Giri	Communist Party of India (Marxist)
Coochbehar (SC)	Amar Roy Pradhan	All India Forward Bloc
Darjeeling	Ananda Pathak	Communist Party of India (Marxist)
Diamond Harbour	Amal Datta	Communist Party of India (Marxist)
Diamond Harbour	Jyotirmoy Bosu	Communist Party of India (Marxist)
Dumdum	Niren Ghosh	Communist Party of India (Marxist)
Durgapur (SC)	Krishna Chandra Halder	Communist Party of India (Marxist)
Hooghly	Rupchand Pal	Communist Party of India (Marxist)
Howrah	Samar Mukherjee	Communist Party of India (Marxist)
Jalpaiguri	Subodh Sen	Communist Party of India (Marxist)
Jangipur	Abedin Zainal	Communist Party of India (Marxist)
Jaynagar (SC)	Sanat Kumar Mandal	Revolutionary Socialist Party
Jhargram (ST)	Matilal Hansda	Communist Party of India (Marxist)
Katwa	Saifuddin Choudhury	Communist Party of India (Marxist)
Krishnagar	Renu Pada Das	Communist Party of India (Marxist)
Malda	A. B. A. Ghani Khan Choudhury	Indian National Congress
Mathurapur (SC)	Dr. Nirmal Kumar Sinha	Communist Party of India (Marxist)
Mathurapur (SC)	Prof. Mukunda Kumar Mandal	Communist Party of India (Marxist)
Midnapore	Narayan Choubey	Communist Party of India
Midnapore	Indrajit Gupta	Communist Party of India
Murshidabad	Syed Masudal Hossain	Communist Party of India (Marxist)
Nabadwip (SC)	Bibha Ghosh Goswami	Communist Party of India (Marxist)
Panskura	Geeta Mukherjee	Communist Party of India
Purulia	Chitta Ranjan Mahata	Forward Bloc (Marxist)
Raiganj	Dr. Golam Yazdani	Indian National Congress (I)
Serampore	Ajit Bag	Communist Party of India (Marxist)
Serampore	Dinendra Nath Bhattacharya	Communist Party of India (Marxist)
Tamluk	Satyagopal Misra	Communist Party of India (Marxist)
Uluberia	Hannan Mollah	Communist Party of India (Marxist)
Vishnupur (SC)	Ajit Kumar Saha	Communist Party of India (Marxist)

== 6th Lok Sabha ==
Constituency	Member	Party
Alipurduars (ST)	Pius Tirkey	Revolutionary Socialist Party
Arambagh	Profulla Chandra Sen	Janata Party
Asansol	Robin Sen	Communist Party of India (Marxist)
Azambagh	Bijoy Krishna Modak	Communist Party of India (Marxist)
Balurghat (SC)	Palas Barman	Revolutionary Socialist Party
Bankura	Dr. Bijoy Kumar Mondal	Janata Party
Barasat	Chitta Basu (politician)	All India Forward Bloc
Basirhat	M.A. Hannan Alhaj	Janata Party
Berhampore	Tridib Chaudhuri	Revolutionary Socialist Party
Birbhum (SC)	Gadadhar Saha	Communist Party of India (Marxist)
Jadavpur	Somnath Chatterjee	Communist Party of India (Marxist)
Bolpur	Dr. Saradish Roy	Communist Party of India (Marxist)
Burdwan	Raj Krishna Dawn	Janata Party
Calcutta North East	Dr. Pratap Chandra Chunder	Janata Party
Calcutta North West	Bijoy Singh Nahar	Janata Party
Calcutta South	Dilip Kumar Chakravorty	Janata Party
Contai	Prof. Samar Guha	Janata Party
Coochbehar (SC)	Amar Roy Pradhan	All India Forward Bloc
Darjeeling	Krishna Bahadur Chettri	Indian National Congress
Diamond Harbour	Jyotirmoy Bosu	Communist Party of India (Marxist)
Barrackpore	Saugata Roy	Indian National Congress (R)
Dumdum	Ashok Krishna Dutt	Janata Party
Durgapur (SC)	Krishna Chandra Halder	Communist Party of India (Marxist)
Howrah	Samar Mukherjee	Communist Party of India (Marxist)
Jalpaiguri	Khagendra Nath Dasgupta	Janata Party
Jangipur	Sasankasekhar Sanyal	Communist Party of India (Marxist)
Jaynagar (SC)	Sakti Kumar Sarkar	Janata Party
Jhargram (ST)	Jadunath Kisku	Communist Party of India (Marxist)
Katwa	Dhirendranath Basu	Indian National Congress
Krishnagar	Renu Pada Das	Communist Party of India (Marxist)
Malda	Dinesh Chandra Joarder	Communist Party of India (Marxist)
Mathurapur (SC)	Prof. Mukunda Kumar Mandal	Communist Party of India (Marxist)
Midnapore	Sudhir Kumar Ghoshal	Janata Party
Murshidabad	Kazim Ali Meerza	Janata Party
Nabadwip (SC)	Bibha Ghosh Goswami	Communist Party of India (Marxist)
Panskura	Kumari Abha Maiti	Janata Party
Purulia	Chitta Ranjan Mahata	Forward Bloc (Marxist)
Raiganj	Mohammed Hayat Ali	Janata Party
Serampore	Dinendra Nath Bhattacharya	Communist Party of India (Marxist)
Tamluk	Sushil Kumar Dhara	Janata Party
Uluberia	Shyamaprasanna Bhattacharyya	Communist Party of India (Marxist)
Bishnupur (SC)	Ajit Kumar Saha	Communist Party of India (Marxist)

== 5th Lok Sabha ==
Constituency	Member	Party
Arambagh	Manoranjan Hazra	Communist Party of India (Marxist)
Asansol	Robin Sen	Communist Party of India (Marxist)
Azambagh	Bijoy Krishna Modak	Communist Party of India (Marxist)
Balurghat (SC)	Rasendra Nath Barman	Indian National Congress
Bankura	Shankar Narayan Singh Deo	Indian National Congress
Barasat	Dr. Ranenendra Nath Sen	Communist Party of India
Barrackpore	Mohammed Ismail	Communist Party of India (Marxist)
Basirhat	A.K.M. Ishaque	Indian National Congress
Berhampore	Tridib Chaudhuri	Revolutionary Socialist Party
Birbhum (SC)	Gadadhar Saha	Communist Party of India (Marxist)
Bolpur (SC)	Somnath Chatterjee	
Bolpur	Dr. Saradish Roy	Communist Party of India (Marxist)
Calcutta North East	Hirendranath Mukherjee	Communist Party of India
Calcutta North West	Ashok Kumar Sen	Indian National Congress (I)
Contai	Prof. Samar Guha	
Cooch Behar (SC)	Benoy Krishna Daschowdhury	Indian National Congress
Darjeeling	Rattanlal Brahman	Communist Party of India (Marxist)
Diamond Harbour	Jyotirmoy Bosu	Communist Party of India (Marxist)
Durgapur (SC)	Krishna Chandra Halder	Communist Party of India (Marxist)
Ghatal	Jagadish Bhattacharyya	Communist Party of India (Marxist)
Howrah	Samar Mukherjee	Communist Party of India (Marxist)
Jalpaiguri	Tuna Oraon	Indian National Congress
Jangipur	Haji Lutfal Haque	Indian National Congress
Jaynagar (SC)	Sakti Kumar Sarkar	
Jhargram (ST)	Prof. Amiya Kumar Kisku	Indian National Congress
Katwa	Saroj Mukherjee	Communist Party of India (Marxist)
Krishnagar	Renu Pada Das	Communist Party of India (Marxist)
Malda	Dinesh Chandra Joarder	Communist Party of India (Marxist)
Mathurapur (SC)	Madhuryya Haldar	Communist Party of India (Marxist)
Midnapore	Subodh Chandra Hansda	Indian National Congress
Midnapore	Indrajit Gupta	Communist Party of India
Murshidabad	Abu Taleb Chowdhury	Independent
Murshidabad	Muhammed Khuda Bukhsh	Indian National Congress
Nabadwip (SC)	Bibha Ghosh Goswami	Communist Party of India (Marxist)
Purulia	Debendra Nath Mahata	Indian National Congress
Raiganj	Maya Ray	Indian National Congress
Raiganj	Siddhartha Shankar Ray	Indian National Congress
Raiganj	Priya Ranjan Dasmunsi	Indian National Congress
Serampore	Dinendra Nath Bhattacharya	Communist Party of India (Marxist)
Tamluk	Satish Chandra Samanta	Bangla Congress
Uluberia	Shyamaprasanna Bhattacharyya	Communist Party of India (Marxist)
Vishnupur (SC)	Ajit Kumar Saha	Communist Party of India (Marxist)

== 4th Lok Sabha ==
Constituency	Member	Party
Arambagh	Amiya Nath Bose	All India Forward Bloc
Asansol	Deven Sen	Samyukta Socialist Party
Ausgram (SC)	Bhagaban Das	Communist Party of India (Marxist)
Azambagh	Bijoy Krishna Modak	Communist Party of India (Marxist)
Balurghat (SC)	Jatindra Nath Pramanik	Indian National Congress
Bankura	J.M. Biswas	Communist Party of India
Barasat	Dr. Ranenendra Nath Sen	Communist Party of India
Barrackpore	Mohammed Ismail	Communist Party of India (Marxist)
Basirhat	Humayun Kabir	Bangla Congress
Basirhat	Sardar Amjad Ali	United Interparliamentary Group
Berhampore	Tridib Chaudhuri	Revolutionary Socialist Party
Birbhum (SC)	Dr. Sisir kumar Saha	Indian National Congress
Bolpur	Anil Kumar Chanda	Indian National Congress
Burdwan	Nirmal Chandra Chatterjee	Independent
Calcutta North East	Hirendranath Mukherjee	Communist Party of India
Calcutta North West	Ashok Kumar Sen	Indian National Congress (I)
Calcutta South	Ganesh Ghosh	Communist Party of India (Marxist)
Contai	Prof. Samar Guha	Socialist Party
Cooch Behar (SC)	Benoy Krishna Daschowdhury	Indian National Congress
Darjeeling	Dr. Maitreyee Bose	Independent
Diamond Harbour	Jyotirmoy Bosu	Communist Party of India (Marxist)
Ghatal	Parimal Ghosh	Indian National Congress
Howrah	Krishna Kumar Chatterji	Indian National Congress
Jalpaiguri	Birendra Nath Katham	Indian National Congress
Jangipur	Haji Lutfal Haque	Indian National Congress
Jaynagar (SC)	Chitta Ranjan Ray	United Interparliamentary Group
Jhargram (ST)	Prof. Amiya Kumar Kisku	Indian National Congress
Katwa	Dwaipayan Sen	Indian National Congress
Krishnagar	Hari Pada Chatterjee	Independent
Krishnagar	Ila Pal Choudhuri	Indian National Congress
Malda	Uma Roy	Indian National Congress
Mathurapur (SC)	Kansari Halder	Communist Party of India
Midnapore	Sachindra Nath Maiti	Bangla Congress
Midnapore	Indrajit Gupta	Communist Party of India
Murshidabad	Syed Badrudduja	Independent Democratic Party
Nabadwip (SC)	P.R. Thakur	Independent
Purulia	Bhajahari Mahato	Lok Sewak Sangha
Raiganj	C.K. Bhattacharyya	Indian National Congress
Serampore	Bimal Kanti Ghosh	Indian National Congress (I)
Tamluk	Satish Chandra Samanta	Bangla Congress
Uluberia	Jugal Mondal	Indian National Congress
Vishnupur (SC)	Dr. Pashupati Mandal	Indian National Congress

== 3rd Lok Sabha ==
Constituency	Member	Party
Asansol	Atulya Ghosh	Indian National Congress
Ausgram (SC)	Dr. Mono Mohan Das	Indian National Congress
Balurghat (SC)	Sarkar Murmu	Communist Party of India
Bankura	Dr. Ramgati Banerji	Indian National Congress
Barasat	Dr. Ranenendra Nath Sen	Communist Party of India
Barasat	Arun Chandra Guha	Indian National Congress
Barrackpore	Renu Chakravartty	Communist Party of India
Basirhat	Humayun Kabir	Bangla Congress
Berhampore	Tridib Chaudhuri	Revolutionary Socialist Party
Birbhum (SC)	Dr. Sisir Kumar Saha	Indian National Congress
Bolpur	Dr. Saradish Roy	Communist Party of India (Marxist)
Burdwan	Gurugovinda Basu	Indian National Congress
Burdwan	Nirmal Chandra Chatterjee	Independent
Calcutta North East	Hirendranath Mukherjee	Communist Party of India
Calcutta North West	Ashok Kumar Sen	Indian National Congress (I)
Contai	Basanta Kumar Das	Indian National Congress
Cooch Behar (SC)	Debendra Nath Karjee	All India Forward Bloc
Cooch Behar (SC)	P.C. Barman	Indian National Congress
Darjeeling	T. Manaen	Indian National Congress
Diamond Harbour	Sudhansu Bhushan Das	Indian National Congress
Ghatal	Sachindra Nath Chaudhuri	Indian National Congress
Hooghly	Prabhat Kar	Communist Party of India
Howrah	Mohammed Elias	Communist Party of India
Jalpaiguri	Nalini Ranjan Ghosh	Indian National Congress
Jaynagar (SC)	Paresh Nath Kayal	Indian National Congress
Krishnagar	Hari Pada Chatterjee	Independent
Malda	Smt. Renuka Ray	Indian National Congress
Mathurapur (SC)	Purnendu Sekhar Naskar	Indian National Congress
Midnapore	Govinda Kumar Singha	Indian National Congress
Midnapore	Subodh Chandra Hansda	Indian National Congress
Midnapore	Indrajit Gupta	Communist Party of India
Murshidabad	Syed Badrudduja	Independent Democratic Party
Purulia	Bhajahari Mahato	Lok Sewak Sangha
Raiganj	C.K. Bhattacharyya	Indian National Congress
Serampore	Dinendra Nath Bhattacharya	Communist Party of India (Marxist)
Tamluk	Satish Chandra Samanta	Bangla Congress
Uluberia	Dr. Purnendu Narayan Khan	Indian National Congress
Vishnupur (SC)	Dr. Pashupati Mandal	Indian National Congress

== 2nd Lok Sabha ==
Constituency	Member	Party
Asansol	Atulya Ghosh	Indian National Congress
Ausgram (SC)	Dr. Mono Mohan Das	Indian National Congress
Bankura	Dr. Ramgati Banerji	Indian National Congress
Barasat	Arun Chandra Guha	Indian National Congress
Barrackpore	Bimal Comar Ghose	Praja Socialist Party
Barrackpore	Renu Chakravartty	Communist Party of India
Berhampore	Tridib Chaudhuri	Revolutionary Socialist Party
Birbhum (SC)	Kamal Krishna Das	Indian National Congress
Bolpur	Anil Kumar Chanda	Indian National Congress
Burdwan	Subiman Ghose	Forward Bloc (Marxist)
Calcutta East	Sadhan Gupta	Communist Party of India
Calcutta North East	Hirendranath Mukherjee	Communist Party of India
Calcutta North West	Ashok Kumar Sen	Indian National Congress (I)
Calcutta South West	Biren Roy	Independent
Contai	Pramathanath Banerjee	Praja Socialist Party
Cooch Behar (SC)	Santosh Kumar Banerjea	Indian National Congress
Cooch Behar (SC)	Upendranath Barman	Indian National Congress
Darjeeling	T. Manaen	Indian National Congress
Ghatal	Nikunja Bihari Maiti	Indian National Congress
Hooghly	Prabhat Kar	Communist Party of India
Howrah	Mohammed Elias	Communist Party of India
Jalpaiguri	Nalini Ranjan Ghosh	Indian National Congress
Jaynagar (SC)	Paresh Nath Kayal	Indian National Congress
Krishnagar	Ila Pal Choudhuri	Indian National Congress
Malda	Renuka Ray	Indian National Congress
Mathurapur (SC)	Kansari Halder	Communist Party of India
Mathurapur (SC)	Purnendu Sekhar Naskar	Indian National Congress
Midnapore	Narasingha Malla Ugal Sanda Deb	Indian National Congress
Midnapore	Subodh Chandra Hansda	Indian National Congress
Midnapore	Indrajit Gupta	Communist Party of India
Murshidabad	Muhammed Khuda Buksh	Indian National Congress
Purulia	Bibhuti Bhushan Das Gupta	Manbhum Lok Sewak Sangha
Raiganj	C.K. Bhattacharyya	Indian National Congress
Serampore	Jiten Lahiri	Indian National Congress
Tamluk	Satish Chandra Samanta	Bangla Congress
Uluberia	Aurobindo Ghosal	Forward Bloc (Marxist)
Vishnupur (SC)	Dr. Pashupati Mandal	Indian National Congress
West Dinajpur	Selku Mardi	Indian National Congress

== 1st Lok Sabha ==
Constituency	Reserved	Member	Party
West Dinajpur	None	Sushil Ranjan Chatopadhyay	Indian National Congress
Malda	None	Surendra Mohan Ghosh	Indian National Congress
Birbhum	None	Kamal Krisna Das	Indian National Congress
Birbhum	None	Anil Kumar Chanda	Indian National Congress
Murshidabad	None	Muhammad Khuda Baksh	Indian National Congress
Berhampore	None	Tridib Chaudhari	RSP
Bankura	None	Pashupati Mandal	Indian National Congress
Bankura	None	Jaggannath Koley	Indian National Congress
Midnapur Jhargam	None	Tudu Bharat Lal	Indian National Congress
Midnapur Jhargam	None	Bandhopadhyaya Durga Charan	BJS
Ghatal	None	Chowdhary Nikunj Bihari	Communist Party of India
Tamluk	None	Satish Chandra Samanta	Indian National Congress
Contai	None	Basant Kumar Das	Indian National Congress
Uluberia	None	Satyaban Rai	Indian National Congress
Howrah	None	Santosh Kumar Dutta	Indian National Congress
Serampore	None	Tushar Kanti Chattopadhyaya	Communist Party of India
Hooghly	None	NC Chatterjee	HMS
Burdwan	None	Mono Mohan Das	Indian National Congress
Burdwan	None	Atulya Ghosh	Indian National Congress
Kalna Katwa	None	Janab Abdus Sattar	Indian National Congress
Nabadwip	None	Lakshmikant Maitra	Indian National Congress
Santipur	None	Arun Chandra Guha	Indian National Congress
Basirhat	None	Chakravarty Renu	Communist Party of India
Basirhat	None	Roy Patirman	Indian National Congress
Barrackpore	None	Das Ramananda	Indian National Congress
Diamond Harbour	None	Basu Kamal	Communist Party of India
Diamond Harbour	None	Naskar Purnendu Sekhar	Indian National Congress
Calcutta South West	None	Asim Krishna Dutt	Indian National Congress
Calcutta South East	None	Shyama Prasad Mookerjee	BJS
Calcutta North East	None	Hirendra Nath Mukherjee	Communist Party of India
Calcutta North West	None	Meghnad Saha	Revolutionary Socialist Party
