= 1999 Indian general election in West Bengal =

- 3 October 1999
- All 42 West Bengal seats in the Lok Sabha
- Turnout: 75.05% (▼4.22 pp)
Party	Leader	Vote %	Seats	+/–
CPI(M)	Anil Biswas	35.57	21	−3
AITC	Mamata Banerjee	26.04	8	+1
INC	A. B. A. Ghani Khan Choudhury	13.29	3	+2
RSP	Manoj Bhattacharya	4.25	3	−1
CPI	Manju Kumar Majumdar	3.47	3	0
BJP	Tapan Sikdar	11.13	2	0
AIFB	Debabrata Biswas	3.45	2	0
This lists parties that won seats. See the complete results below.

Prime Minister before	Prime Minister after
Atal Bihari Vajpayee; BJP	Atal Bihari Vajpayee; BJP

The 1999 Indian general election in West Bengal was held on 3 October to elect 42 members of the 12th Lok Sabha.

== Election schedule ==
The polling schedule for the 1999 General Elections and State Assembly elections was announced by the Chief Election Commissioner on 11 July 1999.

Poll event	Phase
Poll event	V
Notification date	7 September 1999
Last date for filing nomination	14 September 1999
Scrutiny of nomination	15 September 1999
Last Date for withdrawal of nomination	17 September 1999
Date of poll	3 October 1999
Date of counting of votes/Result	6 October 1999

== Parties and alliances ==
Left Front
Party	Flag	Symbol	Leader	Seats
Communist Party of India (Marxist)			Anil Biswas	32
Revolutionary Socialist Party			Manoj Bhattacharya	4
All India Forward Bloc			Debabrata Biswas	3
Communist Party of India			Swapan Banerjee	3
Total				42

National Democratic Alliance
Party	Flag	Symbol	Leader	Seats
All India Trinamool Congress			Mamata Banerjee	28
Bharatiya Janata Party			Tapan Sikdar	13
Independent politician			Natabar Bagdi	1
Total				42

Indian National Congress-led Alliance
Party	Flag	Symbol	Leader	Seats
Indian National Congress			A. B. A. Ghani Khan Choudhury	41 (Note: Friendly Contest on Vishnupur (SC) between JKP(N) and INC.)
Jharkhand Party (Naren)			Naren Hansda	2 (Note: Friendly Contest on Vishnupur (SC) between JKP(N) and INC.)
Total				42+1 (Note: Friendly Contest on Vishnupur (SC) between JKP(N) and INC.)

Socialist Unity Centre of India (Communist)
Party	Flag	Symbol	Leader	Seats
Socialist Unity Centre of India			Provash Ghosh	42

== List of Candidates ==
Constituency		NDA		Left Front		INC+	
No.	Name	Party	Candidate	Party	Candidate	Party	Candidate
1	Cooch Behar (SC)	AITC	Ambika Charan Ray	AIFB	Amar Roy Pradhan	INC	Sabita Roy
2	Alipurduars (ST)	BJP	Dhirendra Narjinarai	RSP	Joachim Baxla	INC	Basanti Baraik
3	Jalpaiguri	AITC	Kalyan Chakraborty	CPI(M)	Minati Sen	INC	Girija Sankar Roy
4	Darjeeling	AITC	Tarun Roy	CPI(M)	S. P. Lepcha	INC	Nar Bahadur Khatiwada
5	Raiganj	AITC	Biplab Mitra	CPI(M)	Subrata Mukherjee	INC	Priya Ranjan Dasmunsi
6	Balurghat (SC)	BJP	Subhash Chandra Barman	RSP	Ranen Barman	INC	Bikash Barman
7	Malda	BJP	Muzaffar Khan	CPI(M)	Sailen Sarkar	INC	A. B. A. Ghani Khan Choudhury
8	Jangipur	AITC	Syed Mustaque Murshed	CPI(M)	Abul Hasnat Khan	INC	Mainul Haque
9	Murshidabad	AITC	Sagir Hossain	CPI(M)	Moinul Hassan	INC	Abdul Mannan Hossain
10	Berhampore	BJP	Colonel (Retd.) Sabyasachi Bagchi	RSP	Promothes Mukherjee	INC	Adhir Ranjan Chowdhury
11	Krishnanagar	BJP	Satyabrata Mookherjee	CPI(M)	Dilip Chakraborty	INC	Ashim Saha
12	Nabadwip (SC)	AITC	Ananda Mohan Biswas	CPI(M)	Asim Bala	INC	Biswas Shashanka Shekhor
13	Barasat	AITC	Ranjit Kumar Panja	AIFB	Saral Deb	INC	Ghosal Debi
14	Basirhat	AITC	Dr. M. Nuruzzaman	CPI	Ajoy Chakraborty	INC	Abu Tayeb M. Moazam Hossin
15	Joynagar (SC)	BJP	Krishna Pada Majumder	RSP	Sanat Kumar Mondal	INC	Jagat Pada Sanpui
16	Mathurapur (SC)	AITC	Gobinda Chandra Naskar	CPI(M)	Radhika Ranjan Pramanik	INC	Monoranjan Halder
17	Diamond Harbour	AITC	Sardar Amjad Ali	CPI(M)	Samik Lahiri	INC	Sk Daulat Ali
18	Jadavpur	AITC	Krishna Bose	CPI(M)	Kanti Ganguly	INC	Dr. Maya Ghose
19	Barrackpore	AITC	Jayanta Bhattacharya	CPI(M)	Tarit Baran Topdar	INC	Ashok Sukla
20	Dum Dum	BJP	Tapan Sikdar	CPI(M)	Anil Bhattacharya	INC	Ramesh Bhattacharjee
21	Calcutta North West	AITC	Sudip Bandyopadhyay	CPI(M)	Rajdeo Goala	INC	Siddhartha Sankar Ray
22	Calcutta North East	AITC	Ajit Kumar Panja	CPI(M)	Md. Salim	INC	Tapas Roy
23	Calcutta South	AITC	Mamata Banerjee	CPI(M)	Subhankar Chakraborty	INC	Partha Roy Chowdhury
24	Howrah	AITC	Kakoli Ghosh Dastidar	CPI(M)	Swadesh Chakraborty	INC	Dr. Subhash Chandra Bandyopadhyay
25	Uluberia	AITC	Dr. Sudipta Roy	CPI(M)	Hannan Mollah	INC	Sisir Kumar Sen
26	Serampore	AITC	Akbar Ali Khondkar	CPI(M)	Sudarsan Roy Chaudhury	INC	Pradip Bhattacharya
27	Hooghly	AITC	Tapan Dasgupta	CPI(M)	Rupchand Pal	INC	Dilip Nath
28	Arambagh	BJP	Chunilal Chakraborty	CPI(M)	Anil Basu	INC	Idrish Ali
29	Panskura	AITC	Gouri Ghosh	CPI	Gita Mukherjee	INC	Rajani Kanta Doloi
30	Tamluk	AITC	Nirmalendu Bhattacharya	CPI(M)	Lakshman Chandra Seth	INC	Manik Bhowmik
31	Contai	AITC	Nitish Sengupta	CPI(M)	Sudhir Giri	INC	Ajit Khanra
32	Midnapore	BJP	Manoranjan Dutta	CPI	Indrajit Gupta	INC	Samir Roy
33	Jhargram (ST)	AITC	Dakhin Murmu	CPI(M)	Rupchand Murmu	JP(N)	Murmu Biswanath
34	Purulia	BJP	Tapati Mahato	AIFB	Bir Singh Mahato	INC	Nepal Mahata
35	Bankura	Ind.	Natabar Bagdi	CPI(M)	Basudeb Acharia	INC	Bula Chatterjee
36	Vishnupur (SC)	AITC	Adhibas Duley	CPI(M)	Sandhya Bauri	INC	Mallika Mandal
36	Vishnupur (SC)	AITC	Adhibas Duley	CPI(M)	Sandhya Bauri	JP(N)	Saha Ajit
37	Durgapur (SC)	BJP	Anil Kumar Saha	CPI(M)	Sunil Khan	INC	Haradhan Mondal
38	Asansol	AITC	Ajit Ghatak (Moloy Ghatak)	CPI(M)	Bikash Chowdhury	INC	Manik Upadhyay
39	Burdwan	BJP	Anup Mukherjee	CPI(M)	Nikhilananda Sar	INC	Raj Krishna Dawn
40	Katwa	AITC	Amal Kumar Dutta	CPI(M)	Mahboob Zahedi	INC	Tuhin Samanta
41	Bolpur	AITC	Suniti Chattaraj	CPI(M)	Somnath Chatterjee	INC	Dr. Susil Banerjee
42	Birbhum (SC)	BJP	Dr. Madan Lal Choudhury	CPI(M)	Ram Chandra Dome	INC	Asit Kumar Mal

== Results ==
=== Results by constituency ===
Constituency		Winner					Runner-up					Margin	
No.	Name	P	A	Candidate	Votes	%	P	A	Candidate	Votes	%	Margin	
1	Cooch Behar (SC)	AIFB	LF	Amar Roy Pradhan	443,148	49.69%	AITC	NDA	Ambika Charan Choudhury	334,983	37.56%	Margin	108,165
2	Alipurduars (ST)	RSP	LF	Joachim Baxla	389,919	51.25%	BJP	NDA	Dhirendra Narjinarai	236,786	31.12%	153,133	
3	Jalpaiguri	CPI(M)	LF	Minati Sen	405,785	48.78%	AITC	NDA	Kalyan Chakraborty	296,848	35.69%	108,937	
4	Darjeeling	CPI(M)	LF	S. P. Lepcha	256,826	44.24%	INC	UPA	Nar Bahadur Khatiwada	144,857	24.96%	111,969	
5	Raiganj	INC	UPA	Priya Ranjan Dasmunsi	409,331	46.74%	CPI(M)	LF	Subrata Mukherjee	334,076	38.15%	75,255	
6	Balurghat (SC)	RSP	LF	Ranen Barman	375,669	44.67%	BJP	NDA	Subhash Chandra Barman	312,748	37.19%	62,921	
7	Malda	INC	UPA	A. B. A. Ghani Khan Choudhury	325,833	40.22%	CPI(M)	LF	Sailen Sarkar	301,280	37.19%	24,553	
8	Jangipur	CPI(M)	LF	Abul Hasnat Khan	352,580	45.47%	INC	UPA	Mainul Haque	291,263	37.56%	61,317	
9	Murshidabad	CPI(M)	LF	Moinul Hassan	391,366	47.30%	INC	UPA	Abdul Mannan Hossain	268,006	32.39%	123,360	
10	Baharampur	INC	UPA	Adhir Ranjan Chowdhury	434,073	46.86%	RSP	LF	Promothes Mukherjee	338,682	36.56%	95,391	
11	Krishnanagar	BJP	NDA	Satyabrata Mookherjee	366,954	43.82%	CPI(M)	LF	Dilip Chakraborty	344,720	41.16%	22,234	
12	Nabadwip (SC)	AITC	NDA	Ananda Mohan Biswas	459,319	45.84%	CPI(M)	LF	Asim Bala	420,184	41.93%	39,135	
13	Barasat	AITC	NDA	Ranjit Kumar Panja	518,520	50.28%	AIFB	LF	Saral Deb	421,620	40.88%	96,900	
14	Basirhat	CPI	LF	Ajay Chakraborty	407,903	47.64%	AITC	NDA	M. Nuruzzaman	325,316	37.99%	82,587	
15	Jaynagar (SC)	RSP	LF	Sanat Kumar Mandal	396,383	49.39%	BJP	NDA	Krishna Pada Majumder	284,082	35.40%	112,301	
16	Mathurapur (SC)	CPI(M)	LF	Radhika Ranjan Pramanik	382,962	46.78%	AITC	NDA	Gobind Chandra Naskar	331,237	40.46%	51,725	
17	Diamond Harbour	CPI(M)	LF	Samik Lahiri	402,761	47.70%	AITC	NDA	Sardar Amjad Ali	331,598	42.23%	71,163	
18	Jadavpur	AITC	NDA	Krishna Bose	485,366	48.97%	CPI(M)	LF	Kanti Ganguly	418,601	42.23%	66,765	
19	Barrackpore	CPI(M)	LF	Tarit Baran Topdar	399,269	48.06%	AITC	NDA	Jayanta Bhattacharya	358,494	43.15%	40,775	
20	Dum Dum	BJP	NDA	Tapan Sikdar	614,471	51.59%	CPI(M)	LF	Anil Bhattacharya	479,910	40.29%	134,561	
21	Calcutta North West	AITC	NDA	Sudip Bandyopadhyay	206,684	46.60%	CPI(M)	LF	Rajdeo Goala	112,514	25.37%	94,170	
22	Calcutta North East	AITC	NDA	Ajit Kumar Panja	297,491	45.17%	CPI(M)	LF	Mohammed Salim	255,917	38.86%	41,574	
23	Calcutta South	AITC	NDA	Mamata Banerjee	469,103	58.26%	CPI(M)	LF	Subhankar Chakraborty	255,095	31.68%	214,008	
24	Howrah	CPI(M)	LF	Swadesh Chakraborty	490,537	49.98%	AITC	NDA	Kakoli Ghosh Dastidar	387,088	39.44%	103,449	
25	Uluberia	CPI(M)	LF	Hannan Mollah	399,397	49.40%	AITC	NDA	Sudipta Roy	331,820	41.04%	67,577	
26	Serampore	AITC	NDA	Akbar Ali Khondkar	411,406	45.14%	CPI(M)	LF	Sudarsan Roy Chaudhary	363,642	39.90%	47,764	
27	Hooghly	CPI(M)	LF	Rupchand Pal	440,674	47.94%	AITC	NDA	Tapan Dasgupta	428,189	46.58%	12,485	
28	Arambagh	CPI(M)	LF	Anil Basu	503,920	53.98%	BJP	NDA	Chunilal Chakraborty	387,199	41.48%	116,721	
29	Panskura	CPI	LF	Geeta Mukherjee	401,431	49.19%	AITC	NDA	Gouri Ghosh	354,573	43.45%	46,858	
30	Tamluk	CPI(M)	LF	Lakshman Chandra Seth	455,168	50.04%	AITC	NDA	Nirmalendu Bhattacharya	400,342	44.01%	54,826	
31	Contai	AITC	NDA	Nitish Sengupta	395,048	48.45%	CPI(M)	LF	Sudhir Kumar Giri	382,915	46.96%	12,133	
32	Medinipur	CPI	LF	Indrajit Gupta	414,545	48.63%	BJP	NDA	Manronjan Dutta	385,772	45.25%	28,773	
33	Jhargram (ST)	CPI(M)	LF	Rupchand Murmu	402,325	50.82%	AITC	NDA	Dakhin Murmu	293,644	37.09%	108,691	
34	Purulia	AIFB	LF	Bir Singh Mahato	351,143	51.55%	BJP	NDA	Tapati Mahato	176,273	25.88%	174,870	
35	Bankura	CPI(M)	LF	Basudeb Acharia	381,720	52.73%	IND	NDA	Natabar Bagdi	274,722	37.95%	106,998	
36	Vishnupur (SC)	CPI(M)	LF	Sandhya Bauri	483,084	57.89%	AITC	NDA	Abhibas Duley	301,514	36.13%	181,570	
37	Durgapur (SC)	CPI(M)	LF	Sunil Khan	461,940	53.15%	BJP	NDA	Anil Kumar Saha	343,977	39.58%	117,963	
38	Asansol	CPI(M)	LF	Bikash Chowdhury	377,265	46.27%	AITC	NDA	Moloy Ghatak	339,401	41.63%	37,864	
39	Burdwan	CPI(M)	LF	Nikhilananda Sar	598,170	61.56%	BJP	NDA	Anup Mukherjee	296,487	30.51%	301,683	
40	Katwa	CPI(M)	LF	Mahboob Zahedi	461,502	50.25%	AITC	NDA	Amal Kumar Dutta	353,140	38.45%	108,362	
41	Bolpur	CPI(M)	LF	Somnath Chatterjee	464,199	59.36%	AITC	NDA	Suniti Chhataraj	277,810	35.53%	186,389	
42	Birbhum (SC)	CPI(M)	LF	Ram Chandra Dome	373,687	51.65%	BJP	NDA	Madan Lal Choudhury	216,531	29.93%	157,156	

=== Results by alliance or party ===
Seat Share by party
1. CPI(M) (50.0%)
2. AITC (19.1%)
3. INC (7.14%)
4. RSP (7.14%)
5. CPI (7.14%)
6. BJP (4.76%)
7. AIFB (4.76%)
Vote Share by party
1. CPI(M) (35.6%)
2. AITC (26.0%)
3. INC (13.3%)
4. BJP (11.1%)
5. RSP (4.25%)
6. CPI (3.47%)
7. AIFB (3.45%)
8. IND (1.89%)
9. Others (0.95%)
Seat Share by alliance
1. LF (69.0%)
2. NDA (23.8%)
3. UPA (7.14%)
Vote Share by alliance
1. LF (46.7%)
2. NDA (37.9%)
3. UPA (13.6%)
4. IND (1.11%)
5. Others (0.66%)

29	10	3
LF	NDA	UPA

21	8	3	3	3	2	2
CPI(M)	AITC	INC	RSP	CPI	BJP	AIFB

Parties/ Alliance		Popular vote			Seats		
Parties/ Alliance		Votes	%	±pp	Contested	Won	+/−
LF	CPI(M)	12,553,991	35.57%	▲0.16 pp	32	21	▼3
LF	RSP	1,500,653	4.25%	▼0.23 pp	4	3	▼1
LF	CPI	1,223,879	3.47%	▼0.17 pp	3	3	Steady
LF	AIFB	1,215,911	3.45%	▲0.15 pp	3	2	Steady
LF	Total	16,494,434	46.74%	▲0.36 pp	42	29	▼4
NDA	AITC	9,189,631	26.04%	▲1.61 pp	28	8	▲1
NDA	BJP	3,928,424	11.13%	▲0.93 pp	13	2	▲1
NDA	IND	274,722	0.78%	New	1	0	New
NDA	Total	13,118,055	37.91%	▲1.32 pp	41	10	▲2
UPA	INC	4,688,932	13.29%	▼1.91 pp	41	3	▲2
UPA	JKP(N)	101,441	0.29%	▼0.21 pp	2	0	Steady
UPA	Total	4,790,373	13.58%	▼2.12 pp	43	3	▲2
Others		223,427	0.66%	▲0.37 pp	60	0	Steady
IND		391,954	1.11%	▲0.07 pp	121	0	Steady
Total		35,292,965	100%	-	309	42	-

== Post-election Union Council of Ministers from West Bengal ==
SI No.	Name	Constituency	Designation	Department	From	To	Party
1	Mamata Banerjee	Calcutta South	Cabinet Minister	Railways	13 October 1999	16 March 2001	AITC
1	Mamata Banerjee	Calcutta South	Minister Without Portfolio		8 September 2003	9 January 2004	AITC
1	Mamata Banerjee	Calcutta South	Cabinet Minister	Mines	9 January 2004	22 May 2004	AITC
1	Mamata Banerjee	Calcutta South	Cabinet Minister	Coal	9 January 2004	22 May 2004	AITC
2	Ajit Kumar Panja	Calcutta North East	Minister of State	External Affairs	13 October 1999	16 March 2001	AITC
3	Satyabrata Mookherjee	Krishnagar	Minister of State	Chemicals and Fertilizers	30 September 2000	1 July 2002	BJP
3	Satyabrata Mookherjee	Krishnagar	Minister of State	Social Justice and Empowerment	1 July 2002	29 January 2003	BJP
3	Satyabrata Mookherjee	Krishnagar	Minister of State	Planning; Department of Atomic Energy; Department of Space; Statistics and Programme Implementation	29 January 2003	22 May 2004	BJP
3	Satyabrata Mookherjee	Krishnagar	Minister of State	Commerce and Industry	5 June 2003	22 May 2004	BJP
4	Tapan Sikdar	Dum Dum	Minister of State	Communications and Information Technology	22 December 2001	1 July 2002	BJP
4	Tapan Sikdar	Dum Dum	Minister of State	Chemicals and Fertilizers	1 July 2002	29 January 2003	BJP
4	Tapan Sikdar	Dum Dum	Minister of State	Small Scale Industries	29 January 2003	22 May 2004	BJP
4	Tapan Sikdar	Dum Dum	Minister of State	Development of North Eastern Region	29 January 2003	22 May 2004	BJP

== Assembly Segment wise lead ==
Party	Assembly segments	Position in Assembly (as of 2001 election)
Communist Party of India (Marxist)	135	143
Trinamool Congress	65	60
Revolutionary Socialist Party	22	17
Indian National Congress	20	26
Communist Party of India	18	7
Bharatiya Janata Party	17	0
All India Forward Bloc	14	25
Others	3	16
Total	294	

== See also ==
- Politics of West Bengal
- 1996 West Bengal Legislative Assembly election
- 2001 West Bengal Legislative Assembly election
