= Krishna Chandra Halder =

Indian politician

The Honourable Krishna Chandra Halder

Member of Parliament, Lok Sabha
- In office 1971-1984
- Preceded by: B.Das
- Succeeded by: Purna Chandra Malik
- Constituency: Durgapur

Personal details
- Born: 4 October 1922 Burdwan, Bengal Presidency, British India
- Died: 7 February 2007 (aged 84)
- Party: CPI(M)
- Other political affiliations: Communist Party of India
- Spouse: Asha Lata Halder

Krishna Chandra Halder was an Indian politician. He was elected to the Lok Sabha, lower house of the Parliament of India from Durgapur.
