= Saradish Roy =

Indian politician (1918–1985)

Member of Parliament, Lok Sabha
- In office 1971-1985
- Preceded by: A.K.Chanda
- Succeeded by: Somnath Chatterjee
- Constituency: Bolpur, West Bengal
- In office 1962-1967
- Preceded by: Janab Abdus Sattar
- Succeeded by: D.Sen
- Constituency: Katwa, West Bengal

Personal details
- Born: 2 February 1918 Suri, Bengal Presidency, British India
- Died: 5 May 1985 (aged 67)
- Party: Communist Party of India (Marxist)
- Other political affiliations: Communist Party of India
- As of 17 September, 2006

Saradish Roy (1918–1985) was an Indian politician. He was elected to the Lok Sabha, lower house of the Parliament of India from Bolpur, West Bengal in 1971,1977,1980 and 1984 as member of the Communist Party of India (Marxist) .He was earlier elected from Katwa, West Bengal in 1962 as a member of the Communist Party of India. As per the request of the local people in his native place, for a railway communication from Suri to Howrah, Kolkata, it had been his effort and initiative the train 53045/53046 Mayurakkhi Passenger, now 13045/13046 Mayurakkhi Express was introduced.
