= Balai Ray =

Indian politician

Balai Roy

Member of Parliament, Lok Sabha
- In office 1996–1998
- Preceded by: Sudhir Ray
- Succeeded by: Nikhilananda Sar
- Constituency: Burdwan, West Bengal

Personal details
- Born: 1 November 1925 Burdwan, Bengal Presidency, British India
- Died: 22 March 2012 (aged 86) Kolkata, West Bengal
- Party: CPI(M)
- Spouse: Chapala Ray

Balai Roy (1925–2012) was an Indian politician. He was elected to the Lok Sabha, lower house of the Parliament of India from the Burdwan constituency of West Bengal in 1996 as a member of the Communist Party of India (Marxist). He was the advocate general of West Bengal under the Buddhadeb Bhattacharjee government and defended it in the cases relating to the Nandigram violence and Singur Tata Nano controversy.
