= Dhirendranath Basu =

Indian politician (1918–1990)

Member of Parliament, Lok Sabha
- In office 1977–1980
- Preceded by: Saroj Mukherjee
- Succeeded by: Saifuddin Choudhury
- Constituency: Katwa

Personal details
- Born: 1 March 1918 Calcutta, Bengal Presidency, British India
- Died: 11 January 1990 (aged 71)
- Party: Indian National Congress
- Spouse: Ava Rani Basu
- Children: 4 sons and 2 daughters

Dhirendranath Basu (1 March 1918 – 11 January 1990) was an Indian politician. A member of the Indian National Congress, he was elected to the Lok Sabha, the lower house of the Parliament of India from Katwa, West Bengal in 1977 as a member of the Indian National Congress.

Bas died on 11 January 1990, at the age of 71.
