= Sudhir Ray =

Indian politician (1933–2019)

Sudhir Roy

Member of Parliament, Lok Sabha
- In office 1984–1996
- Preceded by: Sushil Kumar Bhattacharya
- Succeeded by: Balai Ray
- Constituency: Burdwan, West Bengal

Personal details
- Born: 25 July 1933 Basanda, Barisal, Bengal Presidency, British India
- Died: 2019 (aged 85–86)
- Party: CPI(M)
- Spouse: Sibani Ray
- Children: 1 son and daughter

Sudhir Ray (25 July 1933 – 2019) was an Indian politician. He was elected to the Lok Sabha, the lower house of the Parliament of India from the Burdwan constituency of West Bengal in 1984, 1989, 1991 as a member of the Communist Party of India (Marxist). Ray died in 2019.
