= Kalipada Bauri =

Indian politician (died 2019)

MLA of Gangajalghati Vidhan Sabha Constituency
- In office 1971–1972
- Preceded by: Shaktipada Maji
- Succeeded by: Nabadurga Mandal

Personal details
- Died: 2 January 2019
- Party: Communist Party of India (Marxist)

Kalipada Bauri was an Indian politician belonging to the Communist Party of India (Marxist). He was elected as MLA of Gangajalghati Vidhan Sabha Constituency in West Bengal Legislative Assembly in 1971. He died on 2 January 2019.
