= Mono Mohan Das =

Indian politician

Dr. Mono Mohan Das

Personal details
- Born: March 1910 Nawapara, PS: Nadanghat District. Purba Bardhaman
- Died: 13 December 1992 (aged 82)
- Party: Indian National Congress
- Spouse: Prativamoyee Das
- Children: 6
- Education: City College, Calcutta Medical College

Dr. Mono Mohan Das was a Congress politician and a Union Deputy Minister.

== Early life ==
He was born in a Muchi caste to Purna Chandra Das at Nawpara, Purba Bardhaman district, in March 1910. He was educated at Central Collegiate School, City College and Calcutta Medical College. He worked for some time as sanitary officer in Kolkata Corporation. He was married to Prativamoyee in 1933.

== Political career ==
After being associated with Forward Bloc for a short period, he joined Congress in 1936. He was a member of the Constituent Assembly from 1948 to 1950 and of the Provisional Parliament from 1950 to 1952.

He was elected to the first Lok Sabha in 1952 from one of the two seats of Burdwan (Lok Sabha constituency). The other seat was won by Atulya Ghosh. In 1957, he was elected from one of the two seats of the newly formed Asansol (Lok Sabha constituency). The other seat was won by Atulya Ghosh. Dr. Mono Mohan Das was elected to the Third Lok Sabha in 1962 from the newly created Ausgram (Lok Sabha constituency).

He served as Deputy Minister of Education from May 1956 to April 1957; Deputy Minister of Education and Scientific Research from May 1957 to March 1958; and Deputy Minister of Scientific Research & Cultural Affairs from April 1958.

== Death ==
Dr. Mono Mohan Das died on 13 December 1992 at the age of 82 years.
