= Gangajalghati Assembly constituency =

Coordinates: 23°25′N 87°07′E

Gangajalghati
- Former constituency No. 249 for the West Bengal Legislative Assembly

Constituency details
- Country: India
- Region: East India
- State: West Bengal
- District: Bankura
- Lok Sabha constituency: Durgapur
- Established: 1951
- Abolished: 2011
- Reservation: SC

Gangajalghati was an assembly constituency in Bankura district in the Indian state of West Bengal. It was reserved for scheduled castes.

== Overview ==
Gangajalghati assembly constituency was part of Durgapur (Lok Sabha constituency).

As a consequence of the orders of Delimitation Commission, Gangajalghati Assembly constituency has ceased to be an assembly constituency from 2011. Bhaktabandh, Gangajalghati, Gobindadham, Kapista, Nityanandapur and Piraboni gram panchayats of Gangajalghati block are part of Barjora assembly constituency. Banasuria, Barashal, Lachhmanpur and Latiaboni gram panchayats of Gangajalghati block are part of Saltora assembly constituency.

== Election results ==
=== 1977-2006 ===
In the 2006 state assembly elections, Angad Bauri of CPI(M) won the Gangajalghati assembly seat defeating his nearest rival Swapan Bauri of Trinamool Congress. Contests in most years were multi cornered but only winners and runners are being mentioned. Ramcharan Bauri of CPI(M) defeated Swapan Bauri of Trinamool Congress in 2001. Angad Bauri of CPI(M) defeated Guiram Maji of Congress in 1996 and Phatik Chandra Mandal of Congress in 1991. Nabani Bauri of CPI(M) defeated Phatik Chandra Mandal of Congress in 1987, Guiram Maji of Congress in 1982 and Saktipada Maji of Congress in 1977.

=== 1951-1972 ===
Shaktipada Maji of Congress in 1972. Kalipada Bauri of CPI(M) won in 1972. Nabadurga Mandal of Bangla Congress won in 1969. G.Maji of Bangla Congress won in 1967. Shishuram Mandal of Congress won in 1962. The Gangajalghati seat was not there in 1957. In independent India's first election in 1951 Dhirendra Nath Chatterjee of Congress won the Gangajalghati open seat.
