= Subiman Ghose =

Indian politician

Subiman Ghose (1906 – 21 October 1969) was an Indian politician, belonging to the All India Forward Bloc and later the Praja Socialist Party. A law graduate and respected lawyer, he gained prominence as a local leader and represented the Burdwan constituency in the Lok Sabha after narrowly winning in the 1957 general election. He also contested multiple other elections, including in 1952, 1962, and 1967, but with limited success. Ghose was the paternal grandfather of author Chandrachur Ghose (An eminent Netaji researcher and a fellow of Anuj Dhar). He died in Burdwan in 1969.

== Personal life ==
Ghosh was born in Tela Village at Khandroghosh. He was the son of Nagendra Nath Ghose, and was married to Protiva Rani Ghose. He obtained Bachelor of Arts and Bachelor of Law degrees. He had five children (three sons and two daughters). Subiman Ghose is a paternal grand father of author Chandrachur Ghose who has done commendable work on the life and death mystery of Subhash Chandra Bose. Ghose belong to Telo village, at Khandroghosh, and lived in Burdwan Town of West Bengal.

== Parliamentarian ==
Ghose emerged as a popular local leader of his party in Burdwan District. He was also a leading member of the Bar of Burdwan.

He contested one of the Burdwan seats in the 1952 Indian general election on a Forward Bloc (Marxist) ticket. He obtained 90,242 votes.

Ghosh contested the 1952 by-election from the Goghat seat in the West Bengal Legislative Assembly on a Forward Bloc (Marxist) ticket. He finished in third place with 355 votes (2% of the votes).

He was elected to the Lok Sabha (lower house of the parliament of India) from the Burdwan constituency in the 1957 Indian general election, contesting on a Forward Bloc (Marxist) ticket. Ghose narrowly won the seat, defeating the Indian National Congress candidate by a margin of 2,050 votes.

Ghose lost the Burdwan seat in the 1962 Indian general election, again facing an Indian National Congress candidate in a straight contest. Ghose obtained 123,015 votes (44.17%). The result was challenged in court.

He tried to regain the Burdwan seat in the 1967 Indian general election. Ghose finished in third place after a United Left Front-supported candidate and the Indian National Congress candidate. Ghose obtained 28,950 votes (10.38%).

Late in life, Ghose joined the Praja Socialist Party. Ghose died in Burdwan on 21 October 1969.
