= Sushil Kumar Bhattacharya =

Indian politician (1921–1996)

Member of Parliament, Lok Sabha
- In office 1980-1984
- Preceded by: Raj Krishna Dawn
- Succeeded by: Sudhir Ray
- Constituency: Burdwan, West Bengal

Personal details
- Born: 30 November 1921 Burdwan, Bengal Presidency, British India
- Died: 28 December 1996 (aged 75)
- Party: CPI(M)

Sushil Kumar Bhattacharya (30 November 1921 – 28 December 1996) was an Indian politician. He was elected to the Lok Sabha, the lower house of the Parliament of India from the Burdwan constituency of West Bengal in 1980 as a member of the Communist Party of India (Marxist).
