= Purna Chandra Malik =

Indian politician

Purna Chandra Malik (5 October 1946, Rayan in Burdwan district (West Bengal)) is a leader of Communist Party of India (Marxist) from West Bengal. He served as member of the Lok Sabha representing Durgapur Lok Sabha constituency. He was elected to 8th, 9th and 10th Lok Sabha.
