= Nirmalendu Bhattacharya =

Indian politician (died 2020)

Nirmalendu Bhattacharya (died 5 July 2020) was an Indian politician. He was lawyer by profession. A scholarly person, with multiple academic degrees in history, philosophy, political science, etc. He came from a humble background, with financial struggles which did not prevent to stay away from success, he studied hard, and became a learned men. From schooldays he was a prodigy, cleared high school exam (class 12 standard) at the age of 15. He was still in his half pants when he went to college in Bangabasi College in Kolkata. He became actively interested in politics, and joined Youth Congress, where he eventually contested election, and went on to become Student Leader. He was a prime example of a statesman, voracious reader, excellent speaker, humorous, and safeguard the poorer section of the society. He was shot when Mrs. Indira Gandhi was former prime minister of India, and CPIM was ruling West Bengal. He was admitted to hospital and after operation, he was safe, but had one bullet in his abdomen region, in his entire life he carried that bullet with him. In his entire life He was a member of Indian National Congress. He was a vice-president of West Bengal Pradesh Congress Committee. He played an important role in West Bengal's politics since 1970s. He lived in Linton Street, Kolkata, and was married to Ashrukana Bhattacharyya, a school teacher by profession, and a political activist during 1980s.
