= Benoy Krishna Daschowdhury =

Indian politician

Member of Parliament, Lok Sabha
- In office 1967–1977
- Preceded by: P. C. Barman
- Succeeded by: Amar Roy Pradhan
- Constituency: Cooch Behar

Personal details
- Party: All India Forward Bloc, Indian National Congress
- Profession: Politician

Benoy Krishna Daschowdhury was an Indian politician from West Bengal who a two-time MP winning in 1967 and 1971 from Cooch Behar Lok Sabha constituency. Choudhury was a member of the All India Forward Bloc, in 1971 election he won as a member of the Indian National Congress.
