= Raj Krishna Dawn =

Indian politician (born 1930)

Member of Parliament, Lok Sabha
- In office 1977–1980
- Preceded by: Somnath Chatterjee
- Succeeded by: Sushil Kumar Bhattacharya
- Constituency: Burdwan, West Bengal

Personal details
- Born: 16 September 1930 Dhamachia, Burdwan, Bengal Presidency, British India
- Party: Janata Party
- Spouse: Gita Dawn

Raj Krishna Dawn (born 16 September 1930) is an Indian politician. He was elected to the Lok Sabha, the lower house of the Parliament of India from the Burdwan constituency of West Bengal in 1977 as a member of the Janata Party.
