= Nirmal Chandra Chatterjee =

Indian politician and judge (1895–1971)

Member of Parliament, Lok Sabha
- In office 1952–1957
- Succeeded by: Provat Kar
- Constituency: Hooghly, West Bengal
- In office 1963–1971
- Preceded by: Guru Gobinda Basu
- Succeeded by: Somnath Chatterjee
- Constituency: Burdwan, West Bengal

Personal details
- Born: 19 October 1895
- Died: 1971 (aged 75)
- Party: Akhil Bharatiya Hindu Mahasabha (before 1968)
- Spouse: Surumika Devi
- Children: 2 Sons and 3 daughters including Somnath Chatterjee

Nirmal Chandra Chatterjee (1895–1971/72) was an Indian politician & jurist who served as a judge at the Calcutta High Court & Also was an elected member of Lok Sabha from Bengal. He served as the vice president of the Supreme Court Bar Association, and treasurer of the Bar Association of India. He had also served as a president of the All India Civil Liberties Council, and as vice president of the International Commission of Jurists – Indian Branch.

== Early life and education ==
He was born on 19 October 1895 in Boinchee, in the Hooghly district to Bholanath Chatterjee. He was educated at the South Suburban School, the Mitra Institution, St. Mary's School, all in Calcutta, before graduating from the Scottish Church College. Subsequently, he studied law at the Hazra Law College of the University of Calcutta, before proceeding on to the Middle Temple, London, and subsequently finishing his academic pursuit at the University College London.

== Career ==
He started out as a senior advocate in the Supreme Court of India. He went on to be a judge at the Calcutta High Court. Later he became the vice president of the Supreme Court Bar Association, and treasurer of the Bar Council of India. He had also served as a president of the All India Civil Liberties Council, and as vice president of the International Commission of Jurists – Indian Branch.

He was the President of Bengal Hindu Mahasabha & the Vice President of All India Hindu Mahasabha. He presided over its Gwalior session in 1947. But after partition and assassination of Mahatma Gandhi, he was somewhat disenchanted with party politics. Towards the end of 1947 and early 1948, he felt ill quite frequently and months could not attend his professional work. Doctors advised him that because of the serious attack of epidemic dropsy, he would not be able to lead an active life anymore. At that time, he got an offer for appointment as a Judge of Calcutta High court and he agreed to accept.

He was also a member of the Special Committee on Tibet of the International Commission of Jurists, and a chairman of the Subordinate Legislation Committee of Parliament. He represented India at the Commonwealth Law Conference held in London in 1955. He was a deputy leader of the Indian Lawyers Delegation to the USSR in 1959, and represented India at the International Bar Conference at Salzburg in Austria in 1960 and Commonwealth Law Conference held at Sydney in 1966. He was counsel for India at the Kutch International Tribunal in Geneva.

He was a member of the 1st Lok Sabha (1952–1957) from Hooghly as a Hindu Mahasabha candidate and as an independent candidate for the 3rd Lok Sabha. He also won a bye-poll in 1963 as an independent from Burdwan with CPI support and also the 4th Lok Sabha (1967–1971) when he won again from Burdwan as an independent. He died in 1971.

== Family ==
He married Binapani Devi on 30 May 1915, and later became the father of the Marxist leader, Parliamentarian Somnath Chatterjee, a communist leader from Bengal who served as the 14th Speaker of the Lok Sabha from 2004 to 2009.

== Books written by him ==
- Company Law
- Awakening of India
- Problems of Jammu and Kashmir
- Comparative Jurisprudence
- Indian Constitutional Law
- Fundamental Rights and Judicial Review
- Emergency and Law

== Other works ==
- Indian historical research council.
- Monographs and articles on historical, legal and constitutional topics
- Paper on 'Nationality' at International legal Conference in Delhi in January 1954
- Studies in history, political science, economics, Indology, comparative politics and international law and travelling
- Social activities by helping depressed classes and Harijans, championing civil liberties and rule of law.

== Sports and hobbies ==
- Gardening
- President, Bhawanipore Club
- Member, Chelmsford Club Delhi and Calcutta Club.
