= Pius Tirkey =

Indian politician

Piyus Tirkey

Member of parliament, Lok Sabha
- In office 1977–1996
- Succeeded by: Joachim Baxla
- Constituency: Alipurduars

Personal details
- Born: c. 1928
- Died: 25 January 2014 (aged 85) Mayur Vihar, Delhi, India
- Party: Revolutionary Socialist Party Later Indian national congress

Piyus Tirkey (c. 1928 – 25 January 2014) was an Indian politician. He was a five-time Member of Parliament representing the Alipurduars constituency in West Bengal from 1977 to 1996.
