= Arun Chandra Guha =

Indian politician

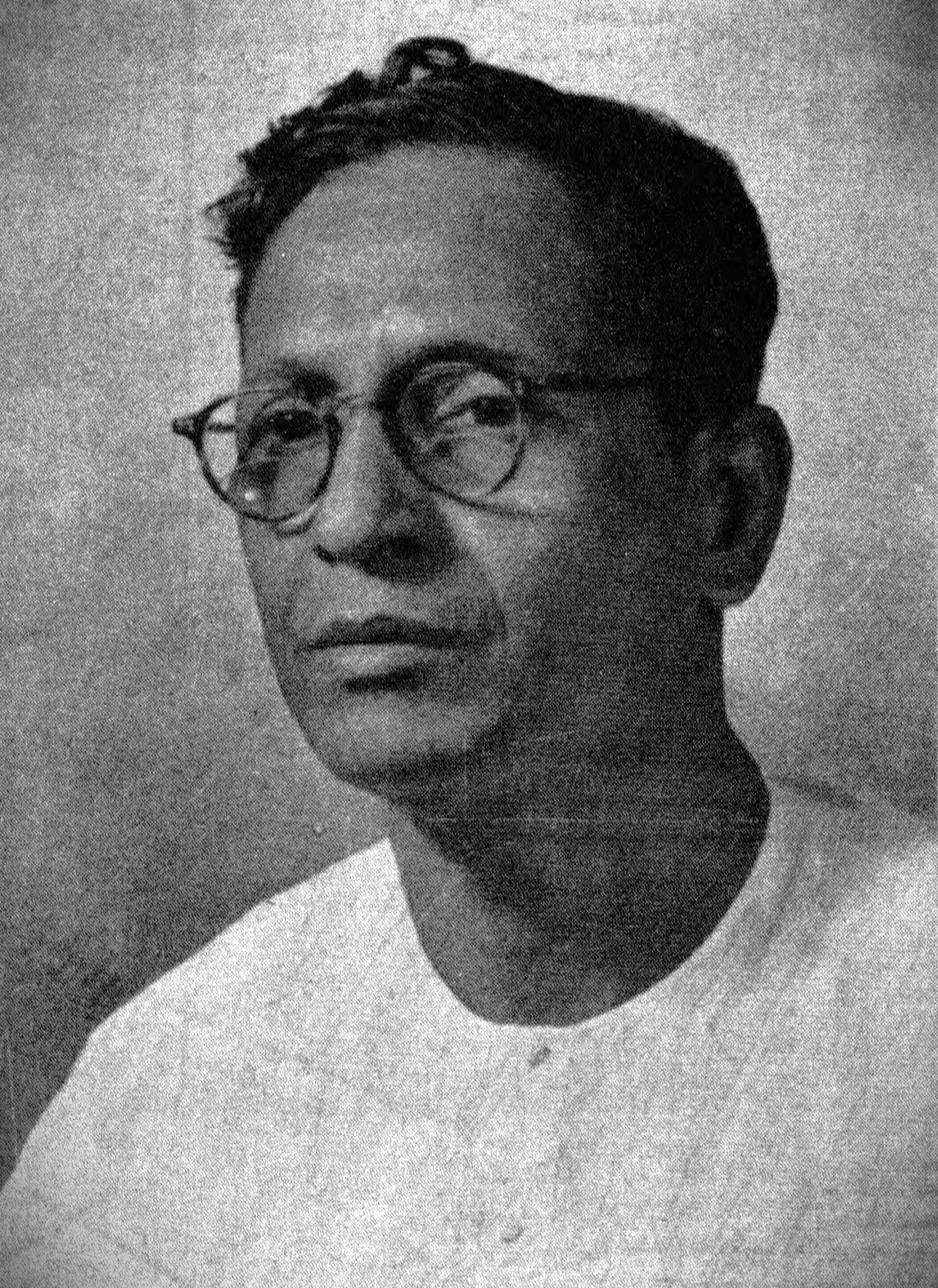

Member of Parliament, Lok Sabha
- In office 1952-1967
- Succeeded by: Ranendranath Sen
- Constituency: Barasat, West Bengal

Personal details
- Born: 14 May 1892 Barisal, Bengal Presidency, British India
- Party: Indian National Congress
- Other political affiliations: Jugantar Party

Arun Chandra Guha was an Indian politician. He was elected to the Lok Sabha, the lower house of the Parliament of India from the Barasat constituency of West Bengal in 1952, 1957 and 1962 as a member of the Indian National Congress .
