= S. P. Lepcha =

Indian academic and politician from West Bengal

Member of Parliament, Rajya Sabha
- In office 11 March 1980 – 2 April 1984
- Constituency: West Bengal

Member of Parliament, Lok Sabha
- In office 1999–2004
- Preceded by: Ananda Pathak
- Succeeded by: Dawa Narbula
- Constituency: Darjeeling

Personal details
- Born: 15 May 1927
- Died: 12 February 2018 (aged 90)
- Party: Communist Party of India (Marxist)

S. P. Lepcha (15 May 1927 – 12 February 2018) was an Indian academic and politician from West Bengal belonging to Communist Party of India (Marxist). He was a member of the Rajya Sabha and Lok Sabha.

== Early life ==
Lepcha was born on 15 May 1927 at Plungdung Basti in Darjeeling to Pusang Lepcha and Dolmi.

== Career ==
Lepcha was a school teacher of Singtam Tea Garden. He was elected as a member of the Rajya Sabha from West Bengal in 1980. Later, he was elected as a member of the Lok Sabha from Darjeeling in 1999.

== Personal life ==
Lepcha was married to Jaisari Lepcha. They had two sons and five daughters.

== Death ==
Lepcha died on 12 February 2018 at a nursing home in Pradhan Nagar of Siliguri at the age of 90.
