= Saifuddin Choudhury =

Indian politician

Member of the Indian Parliament for Katwa
- In office 1980–1996
- Preceded by: Dhirendranath Basu
- Succeeded by: Mahboob Zahedi

Personal details
- Born: 1 August 1952 Memari, West Bengal
- Died: 14 September 2014 (aged 62) New Delhi
- Party: Communist Party of India (Marxist) (until 2001); Party of Democratic Socialism(2001-2014)
- Spouse: Ruksana Chowdhury
- Education: University of Calcutta
- Profession: Politician, social worker

Saifuddin Choudhury (1 August 1952 – 14 September 2014), was an Indian politician who was a CPI(M) leader and MP from West Bengal state of India. In February 2001 he formed Party of Democratic Socialism (PDS).

== Political career ==
He was elected to the Lok Sabha on a CPI(M) ticket from Katwa (Lok Sabha constituency) in 1980, 1984, 1989 and 1991. He took a progressive role in Shah Bano case in his tenure as a Member of Parliament. He later took an important role during discussion on Narasima Rao government, too. He fared badly in the 2009 election from Jadavpur (Lok Sabha constituency), getting just 0.46% of the total votes polled. His membership of the party was not renewed.
