= Abu Ayesh Mondal =

Indian politician

Chairman of West Bengal Minority Development & Finance Corporation
- In office 7 June 2011 – 9 December 2014
- Incumbent
- Assumed office 25 July 2017

Member of Parliament, Lok Sabha
- In office 2006–2009
- Preceded by: Mahboob Zahedi
- Succeeded by: Constituency Dissolved
- Constituency: Katwa

West Bengal Legislative Assembly
- In office 1991–2006
- Preceded by: Hemanta Roy
- Succeeded by: Chaudhuri Md. Hedayatullah
- Constituency: Manteswar

Personal details
- Born: 6 January 1944 (age 82) Akbarnagar, Burdwan, Bengal Presidency, British India
- Party: All India Trinamool Congress
- Education: University of Calcutta

Abu Ayesh Mondal (born 6 January 1944) is an Indian politician from West Bengal belonging to All India Trinamool Congress. He is a former member of the West Bengal Legislative Assembly and Lok Sabha.He was Chairman of West Bengal Minorities Commission also.

== Early life and education ==
Mondal was born on 6 January 1944 at Akbarnagar in Burdwan to Abdul Ohid Mondal and Ashema Khatun. He graduated from University of Calcutta in mathematics.

== Career ==
Mondal was elected as a member of the West Bengal Legislative Assembly from Manteswar in 1991, 1996 and 2001 as a Communist Party of India (Marxist) candidate. He was also elected as a member of the Lok Sabha from Katwa in 2006 bypoll as a Communist Party of India (Marxist) candidate.

Mondal was expelled from Communist Party of India (Marxist) for alleged anti-party activities. Later, he joined Trinamool Congress.

Mondal was appointed the chairman of West Bengal Minority Development & Finance Corporation on 7 June 2011. He served the post till 9 December 2014. He was appointed again as the chairman of West Bengal Minority Development & Finance Corporation on 25 July 2017.

== Personal life ==
Mondal was married to Sanowara Khatun on 18 June 1962. They have three sons and two daughters.

== Controversy ==
In July 2013 an employee of West Bengal Minority Development & Finance Corporation alleged that Mondal called her bad names over telephone. In December 2014 it was alleged that he beat a toll plaza employee with his shoe. After this allegation he resigned from West Bengal Minority Development & Finance Corporation.
