= Mahboob Zahedi =

Indian politician

Member of the Indian Parliament for Katwa
- In office 1996–2006
- Preceded by: Saifuddin Choudhury
- Succeeded by: Abu Ayesh Mondal
- Constituency: Katwa

MLA
- In office 1991–1996
- Preceded by: Syed Md. Masih
- Succeeded by: Subhas Mondal
- Constituency: Bhatar

Minister for Animal Resource Development, Minority Affairs, Haj and Wakf Government of West Bengal
- In office 1991–1996

Personal details
- Born: 2 February 1929 Suri, West Bengal, India
- Died: 8 April 2006 New Delhi
- Party: CPI(M)
- Spouse: Mussammat Hamida Zahedi
- Children: 2
- As of 17 September, 2006

Mahboob Zahedi (2 February 1929 – 8 April 2006) was an Indian politician who represented the Katwa (Lok Sabha constituency) in West Bengal from 1996 till his death in 2006.

A former soldier of Indian National Army, he had fought British forces under the leadership of Shahnawaz Khan. Besides being a leading organiser of the peasantry in West Bengal, he was also associated with the Left cultural movement and the Indian People's Theatre Association (IPTA).

He was Savadhipati, Zilla Parishad, Bardhaman from 1976 to 1991. He was a member of West Bengal legislative assembly in 1991, representing Bhatar constituency. During the period he was minister, Animal Resource Development, Minority Affairs, Haj and Wakf, Government of West Bengal. During his term as MP he was member of several parliamentary committees.
