= Nitish Sengupta =

Indian academician, administrator, politician, and author

Nitish Kumar Sengupta (23 September 1934, Palang, Faridpur − 3 November 2013, New Delhi) was an Indian academician, administrator, politician and author.

== Biography ==
He studied at Jhargram Kumud Kumari Institution and graduated with Gold Medals in his Bachelors and Masters subjects ( from Presidency College when it was affiliated to the University of Calcutta). He joined the Indian Administrative Service in 1957 and held positions such as the Revenue Secretary of the Government of India and Member Secretary of the Indian Planning Commission. After completing his doctorate in management from Delhi University, he lectured at several universities and leading management schools in the country

He represented India at the UN Commission on Transnational Corporations and was elected as Chairman 1981–82. After his retirement, he was director-general of the International Management Institute, New Delhi.

He entered politics in 1996 and was elected to the Thirteenth Lok Sabha, where he served as member of several key committees, notably the Public Accounts Committee. He was also general secretary, All India Trinamool Congress and chairman at the Board for Reconstruction of Public Sector Enterprises, New Delhi. He had been a regular columnist in leading dailies and was the author of twelve books, including several related to management. As a historian, his well-known works are A History of the Bengali-speaking People, Dr B.C. Roy: a Biography and Bengal Divided. He had also authored The Unshackling of Indian Industry: Government and Business, Inside the Steel Frame and My Times—A Civil Servant Remembers.

Sengupta played a key role in the revitalization of India's capital markets in the 1980s. He had earlier been a diligent builder of the Licence Raj while he was deputy secretary in the Department of Company Affairs from March 1968, just as government policy was changing from what he called "benign aloofness" to "massive intervention in corporate business", most notably in the nationalization of major Indian banks in 1969.

For many years he lived in Chittaranjan Park, New Delhi. He died from a cardiac arrest in New Delhi on 3 November 2013.
