= Burdwan Lok Sabha constituency =

Lok Sabha constituency in West Bengal

Coordinates: 23.2°N 87.9°E

Burdwan
- Former Lok Sabha constituency

Constituency details
- Country: India
- Region: East India
- State: West Bengal
- Assembly constituencies: As of 2004: Bhatar; Bardhaman North; Bardhaman South; Khandaghosh (SC); Raina; Jamalpur (SC); Memari
- Established: 1951
- Abolished: 2009
- Reservation: None

Burdwan Lok Sabha constituency was one of the 543 parliamentary constituencies in India. The constituency centred on Bardhaman in West Bengal, which was abolished following the delimitation of the parliamentary constituencies in 2008.

== Overview ==
As per order of the Delimitation Commission in 2006 in respect of the delimitation of constituencies in the West Bengal, this parliamentary constituency ceased to exist and assembly segments were part of either of the two new constituencies: Bardhaman Purba Lok Sabha constituency or Bardhaman-Durgapur Lok Sabha constituency. Only Khandaghosh assembly segment will be part of Bishnupur Lok Sabha constituency.

== Assembly Segments ==
Prior to delimitation, Burdwan Lok Sabha constituency was composed of the following assembly segments in 2004:

- Bhatar (assembly constituency no. 268)
- Bardhaman North (assembly constituency no. 270)
- Bardhaman South (assembly constituency no. 271)
- Khandaghosh (SC) (assembly constituency no. 272)
- Raina (assembly constituency no. 273)
- Jamalpur (SC) (assembly constituency no. 274)
- Memari (assembly constituency no. 275)

== Members of Parliament ==
	M.P	Party
1952	Mono Mohan Das	Indian National Congress
1952	Atulya Ghosh	Indian National Congress
1957	Subiman Ghosh	Forward Bloc (Marxist)
1962	Gobinda Basu	Indian National Congress
1963^	Nirmal Chandra Chatterjee	Independent
1967	Nirmal Chandra Chatterjee	Independent
1971	Somnath Chatterjee	Communist Party of India (Marxist)
1977	Raj Krishna Dawn	Janata Party
1980	Sushil Kumar Bhattacharya	Communist Party of India (Marxist)
1984	Sudhir Ray	Communist Party of India (Marxist)
1989	Sudhir Ray	Communist Party of India (Marxist)
1991	Sudhir Ray	Communist Party of India (Marxist)
1996	Balai Ray	Communist Party of India (Marxist)
1998	Nikhilananda Sar	Communist Party of India (Marxist)
1999	Nikhilananda Sar	Communist Party of India (Marxist)
2004	Nikhilananda Sar	Communist Party of India (Marxist)
After 2009	Seat does not exist	Read the line below.

- For Members of Parliament from this area in subsequent years see Bardhaman Purba Lok Sabha constituency and Bardhaman-Durgapur Lok Sabha constituency.

== Election Results ==
=== 2004 ===
General Election, 2004: Burdwan
Party	Candidate	Votes	%	±%
CPI(M)	Nikhilananda Sar	673,091	67.70%	
BJP	Anindya Gopal Mitra	201,740	20.30%	
INC	Champak Garai	88,217	8.90%	
JDP	Shanti Murmu	21,560	2.20%	
BSP	Dinesh Chandra Sikdar	12,416	1.20	
Majority		471,351	47.4%	
Turnout		9,94,003	81.4%	
CPI(M) hold		Swing		

=== General elections 1977-2004 ===
Most of the contests were multi-cornered. However, only winners and runners-up are generally mentioned below:

Year	Voters	Voter turnout	Winner			Runners up		
		%age	Candidate	%age	Party	Candidate	%age	Party
1951	512,219	35.45	Atulya Ghosh	23.42	Indian National Congress	Subiman Ghosh	17.62	Forward Bloc (Marxist)
			Mono Mohan Das	20.02	Indian National Congress			
1957	213,290	50.15	Subiman Ghosh	50.48	Forward Bloc (Marxist)	Durgapade Chaudhuri	49.52	Indian National Congress
1962	287,685	53.85	Gurucobinda Basu	55.83	Indian National Congress	Subiman Ghosh	44.17	All India Forward Bloc
1963			N C Chaterjee (bye-poll)		Independent	N C Choudhry		Congress
1967	293,266	59.30	N.C.Chatterjee	51.27	Independent	C.Chittaranjan	38.34	Indian National Congress
1971	372,040	64.42	Somnath Chatterjee	56.72	Communist Party of India (Marxist)	Bholanath Sen	38.87	Indian National Congress
1977	363,200	56.85	Raj Krishna Dawn	53.69	Janata Party	Shyama Prasad Kundu	33.66	Indian National Congress
1980	558,710	74.03	Sushil Kumar Bhattacharya	58.97	Communist Party of India (Marxist)	Narayan Choudhury	36.98	Indian National Congress (I)
1984	697,710	83.01	Sudhir Ray	53.50	Communist Party of India (Marxist)	Prodyut Guha	45.08	Indian National Congress
1989	853,780	83.31	Sudhir Ray	61.28	Communist Party of India (Marxist)	Prodyut Guha	38.02	Indian National Congress
1991	855,130	80.57	Sudhir Ray	57.01	Communist Party of India (Marxist)	Asit Baran Patra	30.64	Indian National Congress
1996	983,520	85.96	Balai Ray	59.92	Communist Party of India (Marxist)	Ritesh Kumar Dutta	32.70	Indian National Congress
1998	997,280	83.78	Nikhilananda Sar	58.88	Communist Party of India (Marxist)	Prof (Smt) Santi Roy	31.18	Bharatiya Janata Party
1999	984,680	80.93	Nikhilananda Sar	61.56	Communist Party of India (Marxist)	Anup Mukherjee	30.51	Bharatiya Janata Party
2004	998,350	81.71	Nikhilananda Sar	67.51	Communist Party of India (Marxist)	Anindya Gopal Mitra	20.23	Bharatiya Janata Party

== See also ==
- Bardhaman, formerly known as Burdwan
- List of constituencies of the Lok Sabha
