= Sardar Amjad Ali =

Indian politician and advocate

Member, Lok Sabha
- In office 1970–1972

Member, Rajya Sabha
- In office 1972–1978

Sardar Amjad Ali (born 1943) is an Indian politician, diplomat and lawyer who served as Member of Lok Sabha from Basirhat in 1970 representing Bangla Congress and elected to the upper house of parliament, Rajya Sabha in 1972. As a close aide of the Gandhi family, he was sent to the United Nations for 9 years as permanent envoy representing India. He is considered a stalwart in the politics of West Bengal and is one of the most important political figures of his time. He has been elected president of the Bar council numerous times and is one the most prominent lawyers in East India. He joined Trinamool Congress in 2010 and fought 2011 West Bengal Legislative Assembly elections from Basirhat Uttar. He was Member of Rajya Sabha from 1972 to 1978.
