= Somnath Chatterjee =

Indian politician (1929–2018)

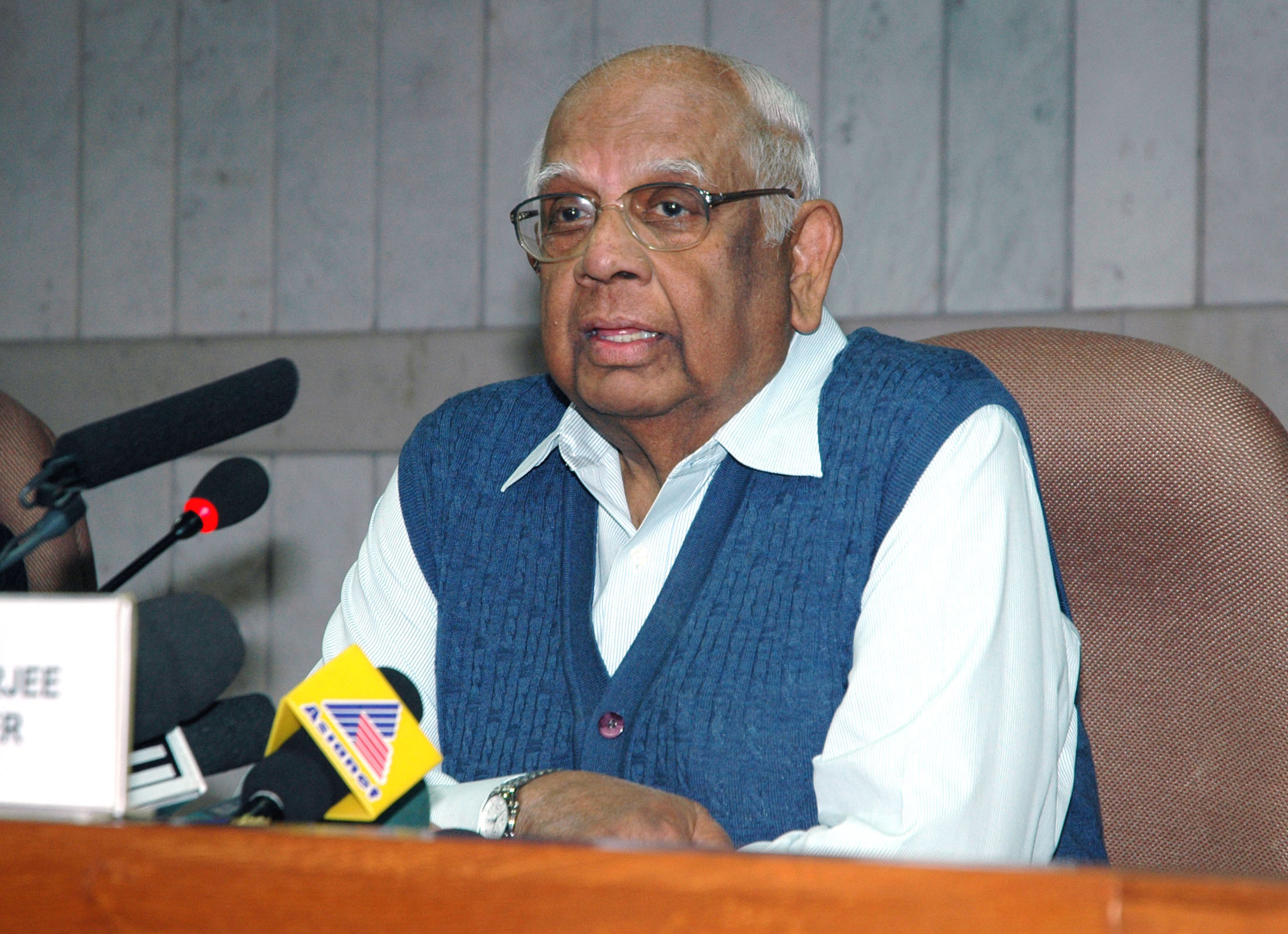
- Chatterjee in February 2009

Speaker of the Lok Sabha
- In office 4 June 2004 – 31 May 2009
- President: A. P. J. Abdul Kalam; Pratibha Patil
- Prime Minister: Manmohan Singh
- Deputy: Charanjit Singh Atwal
- Leader of the House: Pranab Mukherjee
- Preceded by: Manohar Joshi
- Succeeded by: Meira Kumar

Member of Parliament, Lok Sabha
- In office 19 May 1985 – 16 May 2009
- Preceded by: Saradish Roy
- Succeeded by: Dr Ram Chandra Dome
- Constituency: Bolpur, West Bengal
- In office 28 April 1977 – 15 June 1984
- Preceded by: Indrajit Gupta
- Succeeded by: Mamata Banerjee
- Constituency: Jadavpur, West Bengal
- In office 18 May 1971 – 12 May 1977
- Preceded by: Nirmal Chandra Chatterjee
- Constituency: Bardhaman, West Bengal

Personal details
- Born: 25 July 1929 Tezpur, Assam, British India
- Died: 13 August 2018 (aged 89) Kolkata, West Bengal, India
- Party: Independent (2008–2018); Communist Party of India (Marxist) (1968–2008)
- Spouse: Renu Chatterjee (m. 1950)
- Children: 3
- Parent: Nirmal Chandra Chatterjee (father)
- Education: Mitra Institution Bhowanipur Branch; University of Calcutta (B.A); University of Cambridge (M.A); Middle Temple (Barrister-at-Law)
- Profession: Lawyer

Somnath Chatterjee (25 July 1929 – 13 August 2018) was an Indian politician who was associated with the Communist Party of India (Marxist) for most of his life, though he had been a non affiliated independent during his last decade. He was the Speaker of the Lok Sabha (House of the People) from 2004 to 2009.

== Education and family background ==
His father, Nirmal Chandra Chatterjee, was a prominent lawyer, intellectual, and Hindu revivalist and nationalist around the time of India's independence, and his mother, Binapani Debi ran the home. Nirmal Chandra Chatterjee was one of the founders and one-time president of the Akhil Bharatiya Hindu Mahasabha. In 1948, when the Communist Party of India was banned by the Jawaharlal Nehru led Indian National Congress government in India, and its party leaders arrested, Nirmal Chandra Chatterjee formed the All India Civil Liberties Union, and agitated for their release. In the process, he came close to Jyoti Basu, in spite of continuing ideological political differences between the two.

Somnath was educated at Mitra Institution School, Presidency College and then the University of Calcutta in Calcutta. He also attended Jesus College, Cambridge and graduating with a B.A. in 1952 and a M.A. in 1957, both in law, has been awarded an honorary fellowship by the college in 2007. He was called to the bar from the Middle Temple in London and took up legal practice as an advocate at the Calcutta High Court before entering active politics.

== Political career ==
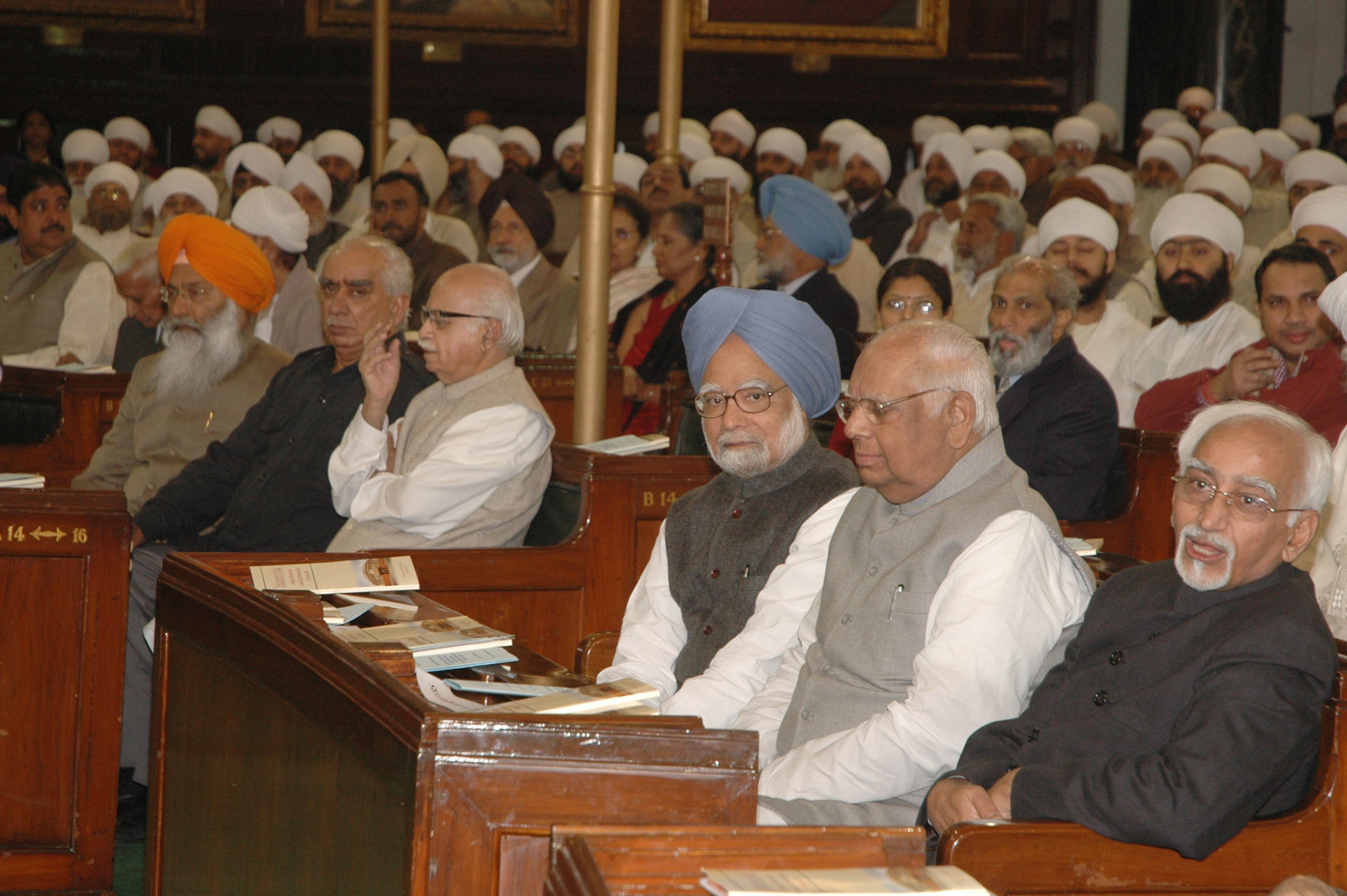
Chatterjee with Prime Minister Manmohan Singh and other senior leaders at the Lok Sabha in December 2008

Somnath Chatterjee was a member of the Communist Party of India (Marxist) (CPI(M)) from 1968 to 2008. He became a Member of the Lok Sabha in 1971 when he was elected the first time as CPM (Marxist Communist) candidate from Burdwan (Lok Sabha constituency). Subsequently, he was re-elected nine times, except once when he lost to Mamata Banerjee in the Jadavpur Lok Sabha constituency in 1984. From 1989 until 2004 he was the leader of his party in the Lok Sabha. He was elected for the tenth time in 2004 as a member of the 14th Lok Sabha from Bolpur Lok Sabha constituency, which is considered to be a CPI(M) stronghold. Following the 2004 election, he was appointed the pro tem speaker and subsequently on 4 June 2004 he was unanimously elected as the Speaker of the 14th Lok Sabha.

=== Expulsion from the CPI (M) ===
After the CPI (M) withdrew its support for the UPA-led government in 2008, the party included Chatterjee's name on its list of MPs who were withdrawing their support from the government, despite his non-partisan position as Speaker. Chatterjee, however, appeared unwilling to follow the party line to vote against the government in a crucial July 2008 confidence vote, as voting against the government would mean voting alongside the right-wing opposition BJP. Ignoring the party's instructions, he decided to stay on in his post as Speaker of the House, acting in this capacity during the confidence vote. Following the vote, which the government survived, on 23 July 2008, the CPI (M) expelled him from the party for violation of party discipline. A CPI (M) press release said, "The Politburo of the Communist Party of India-Marxist has unanimously decided to expel Somnath Chatterjee from the membership of the party with immediate effect. This action has been taken under Article XIX, clause 13 of the Party Constitution for seriously compromising the position of the party." Bengal secretary Biman Bose said "Chatterjee may have acted according to the Indian Constitution but the party constitution is supreme in [the] case of party members."

According to Chatterjee, the expulsion was "one of the saddest days" of his life. He suggested that future speakers should resign from their parties while serving in that office to help ensure its non-partisan standing. His constituency of Bolpur had already been reserved for the Scheduled Castes, meaning he would have been unable to contest the seat in the next election; he announced in August 2008, following his expulsion from the CPI(M), that he would retire from politics at the time of the next election in 2009. He was broadly respected in his constituency; the CPI(M)'s 2009 candidate, Ramchandra Dom, expressed admiration for Chatterjee and vowed to continue his work, while the Congress candidate, Asit Mal, said that the people of Bolpur were "hurt at the way [Chatterjee] was driven out of the CPI-M" and that their feelings would "be reflected in the results".

=== Awards and honors ===
In 1996 he won the Outstanding Parliamentarian Award.

in 2013, he received Living Legend Award at the prestigious Bharat Nirman Awards.

== Controversies ==
In 2005, he was caught in a controversy over his statement on the Supreme Court orders related to the vote of confidence in the Jharkhand Assembly. He said that the Supreme Court was encroaching on the right of the Legislature by issuing orders on the proceedings of the Jharkhand Assembly. He asked for a Presidential reference to the Supreme Court under Article 143 of the Indian Constitution. This remark was criticised by Bharatiya Janata Party which supported the Supreme Court's decision.

The Opposition demanded his resignation because he held an office of profit as Chairman of Santiniketan Sriniketan Development Authority (SSDA). He argued that since he did not profit from the office, the demand was baseless.

== Awards and honours ==
He was awarded Gold Medal of the Hellenic Parliament by the parliament of Greece in 2006.

== Personal life ==
Chatterjee married Renu Chatterjee, who comes from a zamindar family in Lalgola, on 7 February 1950. The couple have one son, Pratap and two daughters, Anuradha and Anushila. Pratap Chatterjee was practising at Calcutta High Court.

Somnath Chatterjee was known for his fiscal integrity. When in 2004, as speaker, he moved into the official residence at 20 Akbar Road, he discontinued the practice of paying for toiletries and tea from the national exchequer. On trips abroad, he bore the expenses of any accompanying family members.

=== Death ===
Chatterjee died at a private hospital in Kolkata on 13 August 2018 morning. An asthmatic and a diabetic, he was keeping indifferent health since the past three years. He was hospitalised on a few occasions hence. The expulsion from CPI (M) in 2008 and his daughter Anuradha's death in late 2017 nearly shattered the once asserting Speaker, Lok Sabha. He had suffered a stroke in June, and his condition had deteriorated in the following weeks. His family asked the Communist party leaders to leave his funeral and refused to allow his body to be draped by the party flag.

Lok Sabha
Preceded by Nirmal Chandra Chatterjee	Member of Parliament for Burdwan; 1971 – 1977	Succeeded by Raj Krishna Dawn
Preceded by Indrajit Gupta	Member of Parliament for Jadavpur; 1977 – 1984	Succeeded by Mamata Banerjee
Preceded by Saradish Roy	Member of Parliament for Bolpur; 1985 – 2009	Succeeded by Ram Chandra Dome
Political offices
Preceded by Manohar Joshi	Speaker of the Lok Sabha; 2009 – 2014	Succeeded by Meira Kumar
