= Janab Abdus Sattar =

Indian politician

Janab Abdus Sattar (Bengali: জনাব আব্দুস সত্তার; 3 March 1911 – 28 July 1965) was a member of the Indian National Congress and freedom fighter. He was member of the Constituent Assembly of India as well as a member of Parliament.

== Early life ==
Janab Abdus Sattar was born at Tola, Burdwan, West Bengal, to Shamsher Ali and Habibun Nesa. He was the youngest son and lost his father at the age of 5.

He persuaded his early education in Tola and secondary education at George Institution, Baidyapur. He joined Indian Freedom Movement at a very young age at the call of Mahatma Gandhi and he was influenced by his school teachers to join the Indian Independence Movement. He was jailed several times for civil disobedience.

He persuaded his higher studies from Karatia College in Tangail (present-day Bangladesh) and joined City College Calcutta thereafter. Then he took to legal profession. Soon after he left his profession to join the Indian Independence Movement.

== Career ==
He joined active politics and became the president of Burdwan district congress committee and he was also the president of various other organizations spread over West Bengal. He served as Labour Minister under Chief Ministership of Dr. Bidhan Chandra Roy from 1957-1962. He was the first to guarantee minimum wages for the coal miners and tea plantation workers. He became Wakf Commissioner from 1962 to 1965.

== Death ==
He died at the age of 54 on 28 July 1965 after prolonged illness at Calcutta National Medical College and Hospital.
