= Katwa Lok Sabha constituency =

Former Lok Sabha constituency in India

Coordinates: 23.64°N 88.13°E

Katwa
- Former Lok Sabha constituency

Constituency details
- Country: India
- Region: East India
- State: West Bengal
- Assembly constituencies: As of 2004: Balagarh (SC); Pandua; Kalna; Nadanghat; Monteswar; Purbasthali; Katwa
- Established: 1962
- Abolished: 2009
- Reservation: None

Katwa Lok Sabha constituency was one of the 543 parliamentary constituencies in India. The constituency centred on Katwa in West Bengal, which was abolished following the delimitation of the parliamentary constituencies in 2008.

== Overview ==
As per order o the Delimitation Commission issued in respect of the delimitation of constituencies in the West Bengal, this parliamentary constituency ceased to exist and constituent assembly segments are now part of either of the two new constituencies: Bardhaman Purba Lok Sabha constituency or Bardhaman-Durgapur Lok Sabha constituency.

== Assembly segments ==
Katwa Lok Sabha constituency was composed of the following assembly segments:

- Balagarh (SC) (assembly constituency no. 188)
- Pandua (assembly constituency no. 189)
- Kalna (assembly constituency no. 276)
- Nadanghat (assembly constituency no. 277)
- Monteswar (assembly constituency no. 278)
- Purbasthali (assembly constituency no. 279)
- Katwa (assembly constituency no. 280)

== Members of Parliament ==
Lok Sabha	Duration	Constituency	Name of M.P.	Party affiliation
First	1952-57	Kalna-Katwa	Janab Abdus Sattar	Indian National Congress
Second	1957-62	No seat		
Third	1962-67	Katwa	Saradish Roy	Communist Party of India
Fourth	1967-71		D.Sen	Indian National Congress
Fifth	1971-77		Saroj Mukherjee	Communist Party of India (Marxist)
Sixth	1977-80		Dhirendranath Basu	Indian National Congress
Seventh	1980-84		Saifuddin Choudhury	Communist Party of India (Marxist)
Eighth	1984-89		Saifuddin Choudhury	Communist Party of India (Marist)
Ninth	1989-91		Saifuddin Choudhury	Communist Party of India (Marxist)
Tenth	1991-96		Saifuddin Choudhury	Communist Party of India (Marxist)
Eleventh	1996-98		Mahboob Zahedi	Communist Party of India (Marxist)
Twelfth	1998-99		Mahboob Zahedi	Communist Party of India (Marxist)
Thirteenth	1999-04		Mahboob Zahedi	Communist Party of India (Marxist)
Fourteenth	2004-06		Mahboob Zahedi	Communist Party of India (Marxist)
	2006-09		Abu Ayesh Mondal	Communist Party of India (Marxist)

For Members of Parliament from this area in subsequent years see Bardhaman Purba Lok Sabha constituency and Bardhaman-Durgapur Lok Sabha constituency.

== Election results ==
=== 2006 Bye-election ===
A bye-election was held on 16 September 2006 following the death of the sitting MP, Mahboob Zahedi on 8 April 2006.

Indian Parliamentary bye election, 2006: Katwa constituency
Party	Candidate	Votes	%	±%
CPI(M)	Abu Ayesh Mondal	541,496	60.32	+8.82
AITC	Susanta Ghosh	356,162	39.68	+3.18
Majority		185,334	19.3	
Turnout		8,97,684	75.8	
CPI(M) hold		Swing		

    - Congress Did not Contest In 2006 Bye Polls In Katwa Lok Sabha Constituency.They Supported Trinamool Congress Candidate.***

=== General election 2004 ===
2004 Indian general elections: Katwa
Party	Candidate	Votes	%	±%
CPI(M)	Mahboob Zahedi	494,716	51.50	
AITC	Sultan Ahmed	351,367	36.50	
PDS	Saifuddin Choudhury	60,693	6.30	
Independent	Hossain Amjad	14,685	9.54	
BSP	Susul Sarkar	10,323	3.25	
Independent	Shyam Sundar Das	8,857		
CPI(M-L)	Salil Dutta	6,290		
SS	Swapan Bhattacharya	5,442		
Independent	Rina Mondal	3,907		
SP	Kailash Sharma	3,541		
Independent	Mohammad Zakaria	3,362	0.49	−−−
Independent	None of the above	3,080	0.49	−−−
Turnout		9,66,263	81.31	
Majority		1,43,349	14.9	
CPI(M) hold		Swing		

=== General elections 1951-2004 ===
Most of the contests were multi-cornered. However, only winners and runners-up are mentioned below:

Year	Voters	Voter turnout	Winner			Runners up		
		%age	Candidate	%age	Party	Candidate	%age	Party
1951	185,672	49.22	Janab Abdus Sattar	39.15	INC	Abu Shied	27.36	WPOI
1957			No seat					
1962	277,329	53.40	Saraish Roy	56.57	CPI	Anil Kumar Chanda	43.43	INC
1967	334,989	68.94	D.Sen	49.82	INC	S.K.Mukherjee	46.44	CPI(M)
1971	382,733	72.16	Saroj Mukherjee	56.91	CPI(M)	Dwaipayan Sen	38.39	INC
1977	369, 900	64.30	Dhirendra Nath Basu	49.84	INC	Syed Abul Mansur Habibullah	46.64	CPI (M)
1980	549,370	77.00	Saifuddin Choudhury	59.37	CPI (M)	Dhirendra Nath Basu	37.41	INC (I)
1984	662, 480	82.75	Saifuddin Choudhury	53.75	CPI (M)	Chowdhury Siddiquallah	46.55	INC
1989	811, 640	83.68	Saifuddin Choudhury	52.41	CPI (M)	Nurul Islam	38.76	INC
1991	819.630	81.15	Saifuddin Choudhury	50.24	CPI (M)	Nurul Islam	31.02	INC
1996	960,920	86.20	Mahboob Zahedi	50.46	CPI (M)	Nurul Islam	39.19	INC
1998	965,240	83.46	Mahboob Zahedi	49.47	CPI (M)	Swapan Debnath	34.89	AITC
1999	933,090	78.83	Mehboob Zahedi	50.25	CPI (M)	Amal Kumar Dutta	38.45	AITC
2004	967,460	82.72	Mahboob Zahedi	51.20	CPI (M)	Sultan Ahmed	36.36	AITC
2006 Bye Election	897,684	75.80	Abu Ayesh Mondal	60.32	CPI(M)	Susanta Ghosh	39.68	AITC

== See also ==
- Bardhaman district
- List of former constituencies of the Lok Sabha
