= Sunil Khan =

Indian politician

Member of the Indian Parliament for Durgapur
- In office 1996–2009
- Preceded by: Purna Chandra Malik
- Succeeded by: constituency abolished
- Constituency: Durgapur

Personal details
- Born: 28 August 1947 (age 78) Bankura, West Bengal
- Party: CPI(M)
- Spouse: Sreemoyee Khan
- Children: 1 son(Ratul Khan)
- As of 17 September, 2006

Sunil Khan (born 28 August 1947) is an Indian politician from the Durgapur constituency in West Bengal.
