= Durgapur Lok Sabha constituency =

Lok Sabha constituency of West Bengal now obsolete

Coordinates: 23.5°N 87.3°E

Durgapur
- Former Lok Sabha constituency

Constituency details
- Country: India
- Region: East India
- State: West Bengal
- Assembly constituencies: As of 2004: Gangajalghati (SC); Barjora; Sonamukhi (SC); Durgapur I Durgapur II; Kanksa (SC); Galsi
- Established: 1977
- Abolished: 2009
- Reservation: SC

Durgapur Lok Sabha constituency was one of the 543 parliamentary constituencies in India. The constituency centred on Durgapur in West Bengal. The seat was reserved for scheduled castes.

As a consequence of the order of the Delimitation Commission in respect of the delimitation of constituencies in the West Bengal, this parliamentary constituency ceased to exist from 2009; some of the assembly segments under this constituency will be part of a new Bardhaman-Durgapur Lok Sabha constituency, others will be part of Bishnupur Lok Sabha constituency.

This page also includes results for Ausgram Lok Sabha constituency during the short period of its existence from 1962 to 1971.

== Assembly segments ==
Durgapur Lok Sabha constituency was composed of the following assembly segments:

- Gangajalghati (SC) (assembly constituency no. 249)
- Barjora (assembly constituency no. 250)
- Sonamukhi (SC) (assembly constituency no. 256)
- Durgapur I (assembly constituency no. 264)
- Durgapur II (assembly constituency no. 265)
- Kanksa (SC) (assembly constituency no. 266)
- Galsi (assembly constituency no. 269)

== Members of Parliament ==
Lok Sabha	Duration	Constituency	Name of M.P.	Party affiliation
Third	1962-67	Ausgram	Mono Mohan Das	Indian National Congress
Fourth	1967-71		B.Das	Communist Party of India (Marxist)
Fifth	1971-77		Krishna Chandra Halder	Communist Party of India (Marxist)
Sixth	1977-80	Durgapur	Krishna Chandra Halder	Communist Party of India (Marxist)
Seventh	1980-84		Krishna Chandra Halder	Communist Party of India (Marxist)
Eighth	1984-89		Purna Chandra Malik	Communist Party of India (Marxist)
Ninth	1989-91		Purna Chandra Malik	Communist Party of India (Marxist)
Tenth	1991-96		Purna Chandra Malik	Communist Party of India (Marxist)
Eleventh	1996-98		Sunil Khan	Communist Party of India (Marxist)
Twelfth	1998-99		Sunil Khan	Communist Party of India (Marxist)
Thirteenth	1999-04		Sunil Khan	Communist Party of India (Marxist)
Fourteenth	2004-09		Sunil Khan	Communist Party of India (Marxist)

For Members of Parliament from this area in subsequent years see Bardhaman Purba Lok Sabha constituency and Bardhaman-Durgapur Lok Sabha constituency.

== Election results ==
=== 2004 ===
2004 Indian general election: Durgapur
Party	Candidate	Votes	%	±%
CPI(M)	Sunil Khan	505,252	59.60	
BJP	Shib Narayan Saha	227,744	26.80	
INC	Shova Dhibar	72,419	8.60	
NCP	Umakanta Bhakat	15,051	1.80	
Independent	Rabindranath Bauri	12,364	1.50	
Independent	Banshi Lohar	8,779	1.00	
Independent	Mohan Chandra Bauri	6,011	0.70	
Majority		277,508	32.80	
Turnout		8,44,777	73.4	
CPI(M) hold		Swing		

=== General election 1999 ===
General Election, 1999: Durgapur
Party	Candidate	Votes	%	±%
CPI(M)	Sunil Khan	461,940	52.20	
BJP	Anil Kumar Saha	343,977	38.90	
INC	Haradhan Mondal	58,407	6.60	
Independent	Tara Pada Mandal	3,222	0.40	
Independent	Rabindra Nath Saha	1,545	0.20	
Majority		117,963	13.3	
Turnout		8,85,335	73.0	
CPI(M) hold		Swing		

=== General election 1998 ===
General Election, 1998: Durgapur
Party	Candidate	Votes	%	±%
CPI(M)	Sunil Khan	468,449	52.20	
BJP	Suryya Ray	326,420	35.40	
INC	Bhagbat Maji	109,253	11.90	
Majority		142,029	15.40	
Turnout		9,21,897	77.4%	
CPI(M) hold		Swing		

=== General elections 1962-2004 ===
Most of the contests were multi-cornered. However, only winners and runners-up are generally mentioned below:

Year	Voters	Voter turnout	Winner			Runners up		
		%age	Candidate	%age	Party	Candidate	%age	Party
1962*	233,065	46.71	Mono Mohan Das	51.17	INC	Krishna Chandra Halder	40.61	CPI
1967*	308,908	58.81	B. Das	51.49	CPI(M)	Mono Mohan Das	48.51	INC
1971*	363,981	57.86	Krishna Chandra Halder	46.40	CPI(M)	Mahadeb Saha	20.05	Bangla Congress
1977	3,59,280	53.03	Krishna Chandra Haldar	63.20	CPI (M)	Manoranjan Pramanick	36.80	INC
1980	5,13,170	69.40	Krishna Chandra Halder	57.27	CPI (M)	Surya Kumar Roy	38.17	INC (I)
1984	6,45,270	77.85	Purna Chandra Malik	53.07	CPI (M)	Gopal Mondal	46.93	INC
1989	7,32,790	71.82	Purna Chandra Malik	65.68	CPI (M)	Gopal Mondal	28.88	INC
1991	7,67,870	73.75	Purna Chandra Malik	55.35	CPI (M)	Bhagabat Maji	30.73	INC
1996	9.17,970	80.56	Sunil Khan	55.68	CPI (M)	Chittaranjan Pramanik	35.29	INC
1998	9,21,900	77.37	Sunil Khan	51.81	CPI (M)	Suryya Ray	36.10	BJP
1999	8,85,340	73.01	Sunil Khan	53.15	CPI (M)	Anil Kumar Saha	39.58	BJP
2004	8,47,770	73.66	Sunil Khan	59.61	CPI (M)	Shib Narayan Saha	26.87	BJP

* Results for Ausgram constituency

== See also ==
- List of constituencies of the Lok Sabha
