= Nikhilananda Sar =

Indian politician (1936–2020)

Member of Parliament, Lok Sabha
- In office 1998–2009
- Preceded by: Balai Ray
- Succeeded by: Constituency abolished
- Constituency: Burdwan

Member, West Bengal Legislative Assembly
- In office 1969–1972, 1977–1991
- Preceded by: N.Sattar
- Succeeded by: Samar Baora
- Constituency: Mangalkot

Personal details
- Born: 30 July 1936 Burdwan, West Bengal
- Died: 30 July 2020 (aged 84) Burdwan, West Bengal
- Party: Communist Party of India (Marxist)
- Spouse: Late Rajlakshmi Sar
- Children: 2 sons and 1 daughters
- As of 17 September, 2006

Nikhilananda Sar (30 July 1936 – 30 July 2020) was an Indian politician who served as Member of Parliament for the Burdwan (Lok Sabha constituency) in West Bengal as a member of the Communist Party of India (Marxist). Sar died on 30 July 2020 in Bardhaman, India, at the age of 84.
