= United front =

Alliance of groups against common enemies

A united front is an alliance of groups against their common enemies, figuratively evoking unification of previously separate geographic fronts or unification of previously separate armies into a front. The name often refers to a political and/or military struggle carried out by volunteers or revolutionaries, including revolutionary socialism, communism, or anarchism, among others. The basic theory of the united front tactic among socialists was first developed by the Communist International, an international communist organization created by communists in the wake of the October Revolution. According to the thesis of the 1922 4th World Congress of the Communist International:

The united front tactic is simply an initiative whereby the communists propose to join with all workers belonging to other parties and groups and all unaligned workers in a common struggle to defend the immediate, basic interests of the working class against the bourgeoisie.

== History ==
=== Formulation and early usage after 1917 ===
According to Russian communist Leon Trotsky, the roots of the united front go back to the practice of the Bolshevik Party during the 1917 Russian Revolution. The Communist International generalized that experience among the fledgling communist parties that were established or grew significantly during the years after 1917. The theory of the united front was elaborated at the 3rd and the 4th Congresses of the Communist International, held from November 5 to December 5, 1922.

Revolutionary socialists represented a minority in the working class, and the united front offered a method of working with large numbers of non-revolutionary workers and simultaneously winning them to revolutionary politics. The strategy was used by leaders after the initial revolutionary tide since 1917 began to ebb. According to the leaders of the Communist International, the shift from offensive to defensive struggles by workers strengthened the desire for united action within the working class. The leaders hoped that the united front would allow the revolutionaries to win a majority inside the class:

The task of the Communist Party is to lead the proletarian revolution. In order to summon the proletariat for the direct conquest of power and to achieve it the Communist Party must base itself on the overwhelming majority of the working class.... So long as it does not hold this majority, the party must fight to win it.

The revolutionaries were told to maintain independence:

The existence of independent Communist Parties and their complete freedom of action in relation to the bourgeoisie and counter-revolutionary social democracy.... In the same way the united front tactic has nothing to do with the so-called 'electoral combinations' of leaders in pursuit of one or another parliamentary aim. The united front tactic is simply an initiative whereby the communists propose to join with all workers belonging to other parties and groups and all unaligned workers in a common struggle to defend the immediate, basic interests of the working class against the bourgeoisie.

However, revolutionaries could not simply go over the heads of the leaders of reformist organizations. They should approach those leaders demanding unity on the basis of a united front. That would pose a dilemma for the reformist leaders: to refuse the invitation and be seen by their followers as an obstacle to unity or to accept the invitation and be required to operate on the terrain of mass struggle (strikes, protests etc.) on which the revolutionaries would be proved to have superior ideas and methods.

The tactic was put into practice in Germany in 1922 and 1923 and, for a time, was effective in winning workers to revolutionary socialism.

=== Stalinist alternatives ===
As Stalinism came to dominate the Communist International, the strategy was dropped. In the Communist International's Third Period from 1928, the period preceding Adolf Hitler's victories in German elections, the Communist International argued that the social democrats were "social fascists" and represented an equal danger to the Nazis. After Hitler's 1933 victory, the Communist International argued for popular fronts drawing in forces far beyond the working-class movement. Trotsky, now exiled from the Soviet Union, argued that the first conclusion was disastrous because it prevented unity against the far right, and that the second was disastrous because the terms of the struggle would be dictated by mainstream liberal parties. He feared that the communists would have to subordinate their politics within the alliance. Trotsky continued to argue for a workers' united front against fascism.

Trotsky argued that the united front strategy would have great appeal to workers who wished to fight fascism:

The programme of action must be strictly practical, strictly objective, to the point, without any of those artificial 'claims', without any reservations, so that every average Social Democratic worker can say to himself: what the Communists propose is completely indispensable for the struggle against fascism. On this basis we must pull the Social Democratic workers along with us by our example, and criticize their leaders who will inevitably serve as a check and a brake.

Marxist theorist and economist Hillel Ticktin argued that Trotsky's united front strategy and approach to fascism, including the emphasis on an organisational bloc between the German Communist Party and Social Democratic Party, during the interwar period would very likely have prevented Adolf Hitler from ascending to political power.

=== United fronts in Asia ===
==== China ====
In Chinese history, during the First United Front (1924–1927), the Chinese Communist Party (CCP) worked closely with the nationalist Kuomintang. The Chinese organized a Second United Front (1937–1943) to fight the Japanese during World War II. Currently, the United Front Work Department gathers intelligence on, manages relations with, and attempts to gain influence over elite individuals and organizations inside and outside mainland China, including in Hong Kong, Taiwan, and in other countries.

==== Vietnam ====
In Vietnam, the Viet Cong organized the National Liberation Front (1960–1977) to gather widespread support against the United States during the Vietnam War. Trotsky and Trotskyists, such as Harold Isaacs in his The Tragedy of the Chinese Revolution, would argue that they were popular fronts, not united fronts, that were based upon the model used by the Bolsheviks in 1917 and later.

==== Bangladesh ====
In 1954, the United Front was a coalition of Awami League, Ganatantri Dal, Krishak Sramik Party, and the Nizam-e-Islam Party in East Pakistan. It won the majority of the seats in the 1954 provincial elections and formed a short lived provincial government.

==== India ====
In West Bengal, India, a United Front (Bengali: যুক্তফ্রণ্ট) was formed shortly after the 1967 West Bengal Legislative Assembly election. It was conceived on 25 February 1967, through the joining together of the United Left Front and the People's United Left Front, along with other parties. The front comprised the Communist Party of India (Marxist), the Samyukta Socialist Party, the Socialist Unity Centre of India, the Marxist Forward Bloc, the Revolutionary Communist Party of India, the Workers Party of India, Revolutionary Socialist Party, Communist Party of India, the Bangla Congress, the All India Forward Bloc and the Bolshevik Party of India. Soon after its formation, a massive rally was held in Calcutta, at which an 18-point programme of the Front was presented. Ajoy Mukherjee, leader of the Bangla Congress, was the head of the United Front. It dislodged the Indian National Congress in the state of West Bengal for the first time.

== See also ==
- Entryism
- Eurocommunism
- Left communism
