= Jagannath Majumdar =

Indian freedom fighter and politician (1911–1999)

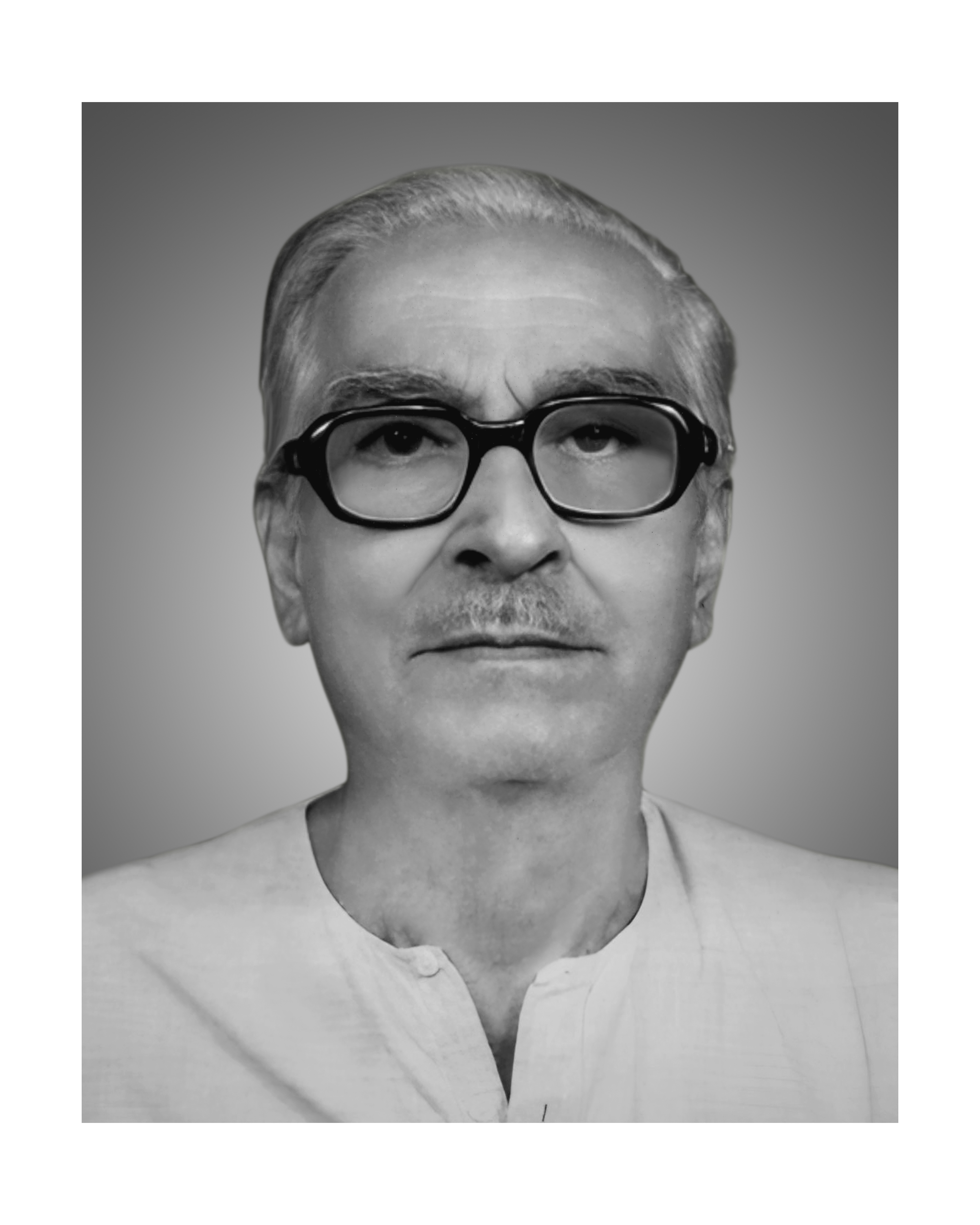

Member of the West Bengal Legislative Assembly
- In office 1951–1957
- Governor: Harendra Coomar Mookerjee
- Chief Minister: Bidhan Chandra Roy
- Preceded by: New Constituency
- Succeeded by: Mahananda Haldar
- Constituency: Nakashipara
- In office 1957–1962
- Governor: Padmaja Naidu
- Chief Minister: Bidhan Chandra Roy
- Preceded by: Bijoy Lal Chattopadhyay
- Succeeded by: Kashi Kanta Maitra
- Constituency: Krishnanagar
- In office 1967–1969
- Governor: Dharma Vira
- Chief Minister: Ajoy Mukherjee
- Deputy Chief Minister: Jyoti Basu
- Preceded by: Mohananda Haldar
- Succeeded by: Salil Behari Hundle
- Constituency: Chapra

Personal details
- Born: 9 October 1911 Krishnanagar, Nadia, Bengal Presidency, British India
- Died: 6 June 1999 (aged 87) Kolkata, India
- Party: Indian National Congress; Bangla Congress
- Education: Calcutta University
- Profession: Freedom fighter; politician; lawyer

Jagannath Majumdar (9 October 1911 – 6 June 1999) was a Bengali revolutionary, freedom fighter in British India and a political leader after Indian Independence from Nadia, West Bengal. He was a part of the Indian National Congress and was a 3 term member of the West Bengal Legislative Assembly.

== Early life ==
Majumdar was born in 1911 in Yadu-Boira village of Kushtia district in present-day East Bengal. His mother, Shailabala Devi, was one of the earliest organizers of Mahila Samitis in Nadia. His entire family, including his brothers and sister; Gopinath Majumdar, Kashinath Majumdar and Supreeti Sanyal (née Majumdar) actively participated in the freedom struggle.

Jagannath's journey in the independence movement began during his school days at Krishnagar Collegiate School, when he met and was influenced by revolutionaries like Anantahari Mitra and literary figures like Bijoy Lal Chattopadhyay. Anantahari Mitra affectionately referred to him as 'damal kishore', meaning 'indomitable youth'.

== Indian Independence Movement ==
Majumdar was a member of Jugantar and also became actively associated with the Bengal Provincial Congress under the leadership of Tarakdas Bandopadhyay since 1926. In 1928, he played a vital role as an organizer at the Basirhat conference of the Bengal Provincial Congress. By 1930, Jagannath was a well-known freedom fighter and student leader, planning his operations from Sadhana Library, founded by Ananta Hari Mitra and later named by Chittaranjan Das. Later that year, Jagannath was arrested for his active participation in the Civil Disobedience Movement and spent 3 years in jail without trial. He was imprisoned at the Buxa Fort, near the Bhutan-Alipurduar border. After his release, he faced home internment in various locations within Bengal. With several intermittent prison terms, he completed his Bachelor of Laws from Calcutta University in 1936 and received his degree while in jail in 1938.

Majumdar actively mobilized people in Bengal during the Quit India Movement in 1942. He joined forces with Haripada Chattopadhyay to disrupt British administration by damaging infrastructure and government buildings. After eight months on the run, he was arrested in Kolkata's Ballygunge area.

Majumdar faced imprisonment as an undertrial in various jails, including Alipore Central Jail, Krishnanagar Jail and finally Delhi Central Jail, where he underwent several mock trials that failed to implicate him. He was released in September 1945, after having spent a total of 12 years in British custody.

== Post Independence ==
After 1947, Majumdar became the President of Nadia District Congress and served as a member of the All India Congress Committee and the West Bengal Legislative Assembly.

In the 1952 elections he won from Nakashipara and was a part of the Bidhan Chandra Roy government. He was a member of the 2nd West Bengal Legislative Assembly winning from Krishnanagar in 1957. In the 1962 West Bengal Legislative Assembly election he lost the Krishnanagar constituency to Praja Socialist Party candidate Kashi Kanta Maitra.

== Formation of Bangla Congress ==
In 1966 the left leaning wing of the West Bengal Pradesh Congress, represented by Ajoy Mukherjee, Pranab Mukherjee, Siddhartha Shankar Ray, A. B. A. Ghani Khan Choudhury, Abha Maiti revolted against the leadership of the old conservative elites of "the syndicate" like Prafulla Chandra Sen and Atulya Ghosh owing to the policies of the Prafulla Sen government during the Food Movement. As a result, the Bangla Congress was formed through a split in the Indian National Congress in West Bengal in May, 1966. Among a few other places, the Party had a strong base in Nadia and Murshidabad. Going into the 1967 elections, there were two fronts opposing the Indian National Congress, the United Left Front led by the Communist Party of India (Marxist) and the People's United Left Front comprising Bangla Congress, Communist Party of India and the All India Forward Bloc.

Majumdar fought the 1967 elections as a Bangla Congress candidate for the People's United Left Front and won from Chapra. Shortly after the elections, the 2 fronts came together to form the United Front and dislodge the Indian National Congress for the first time in West Bengal since independence. The United Front formed government on an 18-Point Programme with Ajoy Mukherjee as the Chief Minister and Jyoti Basu as the Deputy Chief Minister in March 1967.

== Legacy ==
In 1972, marking the 25th year of Indian Independence, Majumdar was awarded the Tamra Patra for outstanding contribution to the freedom movement by Prime Minister Indira Gandhi. He is the father of Jay Prakash Majumdar, State Vice President of All India Trinamool Congress.
