= Jyotibhushan Bhattacharya =

Indian politician

Professor Jyotibhushan Bhattacharya (1 May 1926 – 1998) was an Indian politician and scholar. He served as general secretary of the Workers Party of India. He served as a Minister in both of the United Front governments in West Bengal.

== Youth ==
Bhattacharya was born on 1 May 1926. He studied at Calcutta University and Leeds University, obtaining M.A. degrees at both universities. He took part in the Quit India Movement and was jailed during the struggle for Indian independence. Bhattacharya came into contact with the Democratic Vanguard leader Jiban Lal Chatterjee in 1943. After Chatterjee founded the WPI, Bhattacharya became a key leader of the party.

== WPI leader ==
Bhattacharya worked as a lecturer in English at Dibrugarh University, Assam, later shifting to Calcutta University, where he retired as Professor of English. During the Sino-Indian War of 1962 cadres of the Communist Party of India, the Socialist Unity Centre of India and WPI were arrested. Bhattacharya, as a leading party member, was one of the WPI cadres caught in this wave of arrests.

== Education Minister ==
Bhattacharya won the Ballygunge constituency seat in the 1967 West Bengal Legislative Assembly election. He obtained 21,153 votes (53.74%). He served as Education Minister in the first United Front cabinet 1967–1968.

== Information and Public Relations Minister ==
Bhattacharya retained the Ballygunge seat in the 1969 West Bengal Legislative Assembly election, obtaining 22,941 votes (55.95%). He served as Minister of Information and Public Relations in the second United Front cabinet 1969–1970. On 28 May 1969 a mob attacked Bhattacharya's residence.

== Later years ==
Bhattarcharya lost his seat in the 1971 West Bengal Legislative Assembly election. He finished in second place with 13,943 (38.42%). During the violent environment of the election campaign, he had to leave the constituency and live elsewhere. In September 1971 he presented his unpublished thesis Fascism: A Developing Trend in India at the Second All India Conference of the Indian School of Social Sciences. According to the thesis, a fascist system of governance was emerging in India under Congress (I) rule. Bhattacharya again contested the Ballygunge seat in the 1972 West Bengal Legislative Assembly election, finishing in second place with 18,181 votes (35.49%).

The WPI was split in 1976, with Bhattacharya leading the minority faction. Bhattacharya was seen as closely linked to the Communist Party of India (Marxist). He was expelled from WPI in early 1976, accused of 'anti-party activities' in the party organ Ganabiplab. After his expulsion he founded the Communist Workers Party.

As of the 1980s Bhattacharya was the Head of the Department of English at Calcutta University. Bhattacharya died in 1998.
