= 2020 Indian general strike =

Trade union event on 26 November 2020

External videos
- Prof. Richard Wolff: India's Historic General Strike on YouTube

The 2020 Indian general strike was a mass general strike that was held across India on 26 November 2020.

The strike was organized by 10 trade unions across the country and was supported by the Indian National Congress, Communist Party of India, Communist Party of India (Marxist), and other left-wing parties. Trade unions claim 250 million (25 crore) people took part in the strike. It is considered the largest strike in world history.

The strike was followed by a farmers march to New Delhi, which arrived there on 30 November with tens of thousands of farmers surrounding Delhi, increasing to hundreds of thousands by 3 December.

== Strikers' demands ==
The workers' unions presented a list of seven demands:

1. Direct cash transfer of ₹7,500 (equivalent to ₹8,800 or US$92 in 2023) per month to all families who earn less than the income tax threshold
2. 10 kg (22 lb) free grain ration per person every month to all in need.
3. Expansion of the Mahatma Gandhi National Rural Employment Guarantee Act to provide employment from the current 100 days to 200 days work in rural areas with enhanced wages, and extension of this programme to urban areas
4. Withdrawal of all anti-worker labour code changes and liberalizing agricultural reforms seen by the protesters as anti-farmer laws despite the proven hostile nature of Indian labor as a significant impediment to the growth of manufacturing sector in India.
5. Stop privatisation of public sector corporations, including those in the financial sector. Stop the corporatisation of government-run manufacturing and service entities in railways, ordnance manufacturing, ports and similar areas. (Note: Some public sector companies the government has been accused of trying to privatise include the Indian Railways, BSNL and Air India)
6. Withdraw the circular of forced premature retirement of government and public sector employees.
7. Provide a pension to all, restore earlier pension scheme and improve EPS 95.

== Organisers ==
The trade unions involved included the Indian National Trade Union Congress (INTUC), All India Trade Union Congress (AITUC), Hind Mazdoor Sabha (HMS), Centre of Indian Trade Unions (CITU), All India United Trade Union Centre (AIUTUC), Trade Union Coordination Centre (TUCC), Self-Employed Women's Association (SEWA), All India Central Council of Trade Unions (AICCTU), Labour Progressive Federation (LPF) and United Trade Union Congress (UTUC).

Several other organisations were involved in the strike. The All India Bank Employees' Association (AIBEA) stated that nearly 30,000 bank employees were to participate in the strike. The Independent Sectoral Federations and Associations (ISFA) released strike notice to workers of all industries, calling scheme workers, construction workers, beedi workers, domestic workers, agricultural workers, vendors, hawkers, and self-employed people in rural as well as urban India to come onto the streets for chakka jam, a demonstration meant to block traffic. According to a statement made by the CPIM, there was "massive participation" by people who did not receive strike notice, such as informal sector workers, students, women, and peasants. Approximately a quarter of all working-aged people in India participated in the general strike.

The date of the general strike converged with the All India Kisan Sangharsh Co-ordination Committee's own strike calling for newly enacted anti-farmer agricultural laws to be repealed. The worker's unions and the AIKSCC declared their solidarity with each other in the days leading up to the general strike and the AIKSCC's "Chalo Delhi" ('Go to Delhi') mobilization.

== Strike and march to New Delhi ==
The initial, 24-hour general strike took place all across India. Five states – Kerala, Puducherry, Odisha, Assam and Telangana – were completely shut down. Jharkhand and Chhattisgarh reported a 100% strike. Tamil Nadu reported shut-down in 13 of 38 districts, with industrial strikes continuing in the remaining districts. In Punjab and Haryana, state transport buses did not leave their depots. The strike saw stoppages of work in banks, financial services, various government services, transport, steel units, ports and docks, telecommunication services, plantations, power generating units, coal and other mines, oil and natural gas production units, and millions of other places.

The strike was followed by the 2020–2021 Indian farmers' protest march to the Indian capital New Delhi. On 30 November, "tens of thousands of farmers and their supporters ... [were] demonstrating at several road junctions". By 3 December, BBC News estimated the number of farmers blocking New Delhi in the hundreds of thousands.

== Role of social media ==
A "photograph of a paramilitary policeman swinging his baton at an elderly Sikh man", later identified as Sukhdev Singh, taken by Ravi Choudhury of Press Trust of India (PTI) went viral on social media. Politicians opposed to the ruling Bharatiya Janata Party (BJP) used the image to criticise police violence, while BJP members claimed that the Sikh farmer had not been hit. Choudhury said that the man had been hit by the policeman. A fact-checking website, Boomlive, interviewed Singh, who stated that he had been hit by two policemen, and sustained injuries to his "forearm, back and calf muscle".

Social media also helped start a Sikh solidarity protest in London, United Kingdom on 6 December 2020.

== See also ==
- 2020–2021 Indian farmers' protest
- COVID-19 pandemic in India
- Strikes during the COVID-19 pandemic
