= 1967 West Bengal Legislative Assembly election =

Assembly Election of West Bengal, India

- 25 February 1967

All 280 seats in the West Bengal Legislative Assembly 141 seats needed for a majority

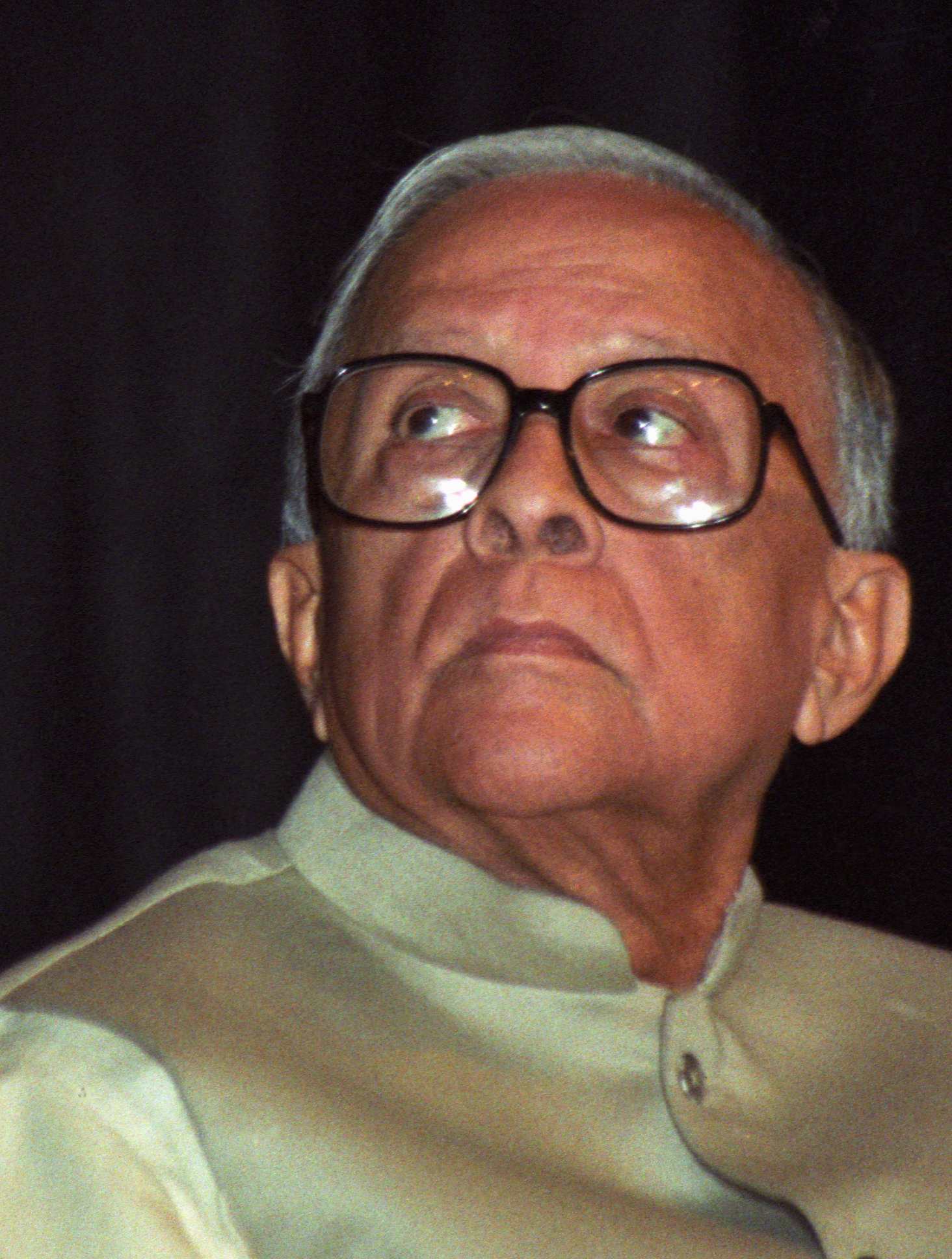

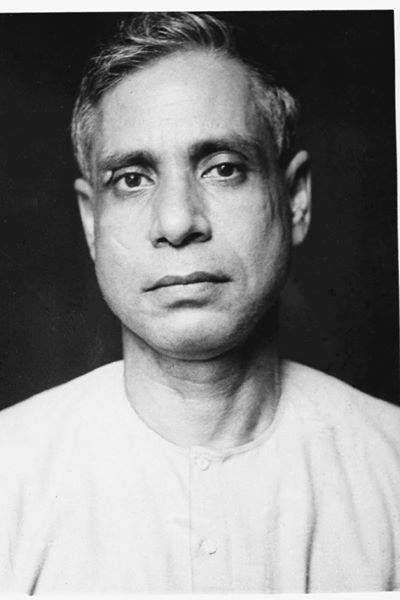

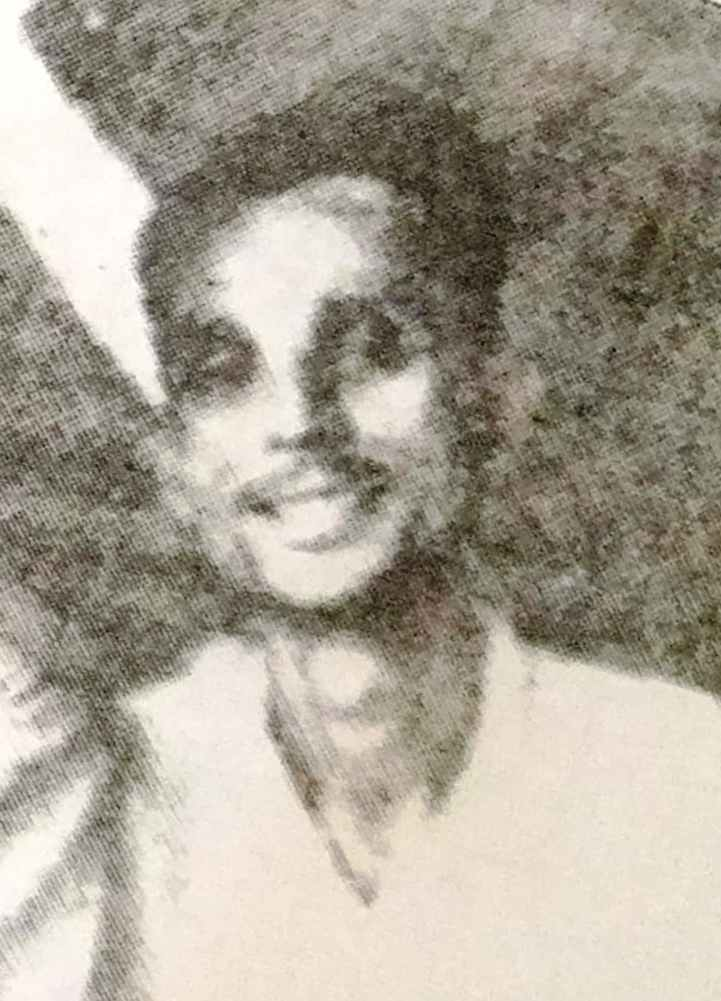
	First party	Second party
Leader	Prafulla Chandra Sen	Jyoti Basu
Party	INC	CPI(M)
Alliance		ULF
Leader since	1962	1964
Leader's seat	Arambag (lost)	Baranagar (won)
Last election	47.3%, 157 seats	New Party
Seats won	127	43
Seat change	▼30	New
Popular vote	5,207,930	2,293,026
Percentage	41.1%	18.1%
Swing	▼6.2 pp	New
	Third party	Fourth party
Leader	Ajoy Mukherjee	Somnath Lahiri
Party	Bangla Congress	CPI
Alliance	PULF	PULF
Leader since	1967	1967
Leader's seat	Tamluk (vacated); Arambag	Dhakuria (won)
Last election	New Party	24.96%, 50 Seats
Seats won	34	16
Seat change	New	▼34
Popular vote	1,286,028	827,196
Percentage	10.16%	6.53 %
Swing	New	▼18.43 pp
- Structure of the West Bengal Legislative Assembly after the election
Chief Minister before election
Prafulla Chandra Sen
INC
Chief Minister after election
Ajoy Mukherjee
Bangla Congress

Legislative Assembly elections were held in Indian state of West Bengal in 1967 to elect 280 members to the West Bengal Legislative Assembly. United Front led by Ajoy Mukherjee won majority of seats in the election, and formed the first non-Congress government of the state.

== Results ==
Summary of results of the West Bengal Legislative Assembly election, 1967
Party	Candidates	Seats	Votes	Vote%	Seat change
Indian National Congress	280	127	5,207,930	41.13%	▼30
CPI(M)	135	43	2,293,026	18.11%	▲43
Bangla Congress	80	34	1,286,028	10.16%	▲34
Communist Party of India	62	16	827,196	6.53%	▼34
All India Forward Bloc	42	13	561,148	4.43%	Steady
Samyukta Socialist Party	26	7	269,234	2.13%	▲7
Praja Socialist Party	26	7	238,694	1.88%	▲2
Bharatiya Jana Sangh	58	1	167,934	1.33%	▲1
Swatantra Party	21	1	102,576	0.81%	▲1
Independent	327	31	1,708,011	13.49%	▲20
Total	1058	280	12,663,030		

== Elected members ==
No	Constituency	Reserved for (SC/ST/None)	Member	Party
1	Mekliganj	SC	Amar Roy Pradhan	All India Forward Bloc
2	Mathabhanga	SC	Dinesh Chandra Dakua	CPI(M)
3	Cooch Behar West	SC	Prasenjit Barman	Indian National Congress
4	Sitai	None	Fazle Haque	Indian National Congress
5	Dinhata	None	Kamal Guha	All India Forward Bloc
6	Cooch Behar North	None	Matiranjan Tar	Indian National Congress
7	Cooch Behar South	None	Santosh Roy	Indian National Congress
8	Tufanganj	SC	Sankar Sen Ishore	Indian National Congress
9	Kumargram	None	Pijush Kanti Mukherjee	Indian National Congress
10	Kalchini	ST	D. Lakra	Indian National Congress
11	Alipore Duars	None	N. Bhattacharya	Independent
12	Falakata	SC	J. Roy	Praja Socialist Party
13	Madarihat	ST	D. N. Rai	Indian National Congress
14	Dhupguri	None	A. G. Neogi	Samyukta Socialist Party
15	Nagrakata	ST	B. Bhagat	Indian National Congress
16	Mainaguri	SC	J. Ray	Bangla Congress
17	Mal	ST	A. Topna	Indian National Congress
18	Jalpaiguri	None	K. N. Das Gupta	Indian National Congress
19	Rajganj	SC	B. N. R. Hakim	Samyukta Socialist Party
20	Kalimpong	None	K. B. Gurung	Indian National Congress
21	Darjeeling	None	Deo Prakash Rai	Independent
22	Jorebunglow	None	Nandalal Gurung	Independent
23	Siliguri	None	A. K. Moitra	Indian National Congress
24	Phansidewa	ST	T. Wangoi	Indian National Congress
25	Chopra	None	A. Chowdhury	Indian National Congress
26	Goal Pokhar	None	M. Salimuddin	Praja Socialist Party
27	Karandighi	None	H. S. Hussain	Praja Socialist Party
28	Raiganj	None	N. N. Kundu	Praja Socialist Party
29	Kaliaganj	SC	S. P. Barman	Indian National Congress
30	Itahar	None	Z. Abedin	Indian National Congress
31	Kushmandi	SC	J. M. Roy	Indian National Congress
32	Gangarampur	None	Khalil Sayed	Indian National Congress
33	Kumarganj	None	M. Bose	Indian National Congress
34	Balurghat	None	M. Basu	Independent
35	Tapan	ST	N. Murmu	Independent
36	Habibpur	ST	B. Murmu	Indian National Congress
37	Gajol	ST	D. Murmu	Indian National Congress
38	Kharba	None	G. Yazdani	Independent
39	Harish Chandrapur	None	M. E. Razi	Independent
40	Ratda	None	S. M. Misra	Indian National Congress
41	Malda	None	M. S. Mia	Indian National Congress
42	Englishbazar	None	S. G. Sen	Indian National Congress
43	Manikchak	None	R. S. Singhi	Swatantra Party
44	Suzapur	None	A. B. A. G. K. Choudhury	Indian National Congress
45	Kaliachak	None	N. Islam	CPI(M)
46	Farakka	None	T. A. N. Nabi	Bangla Congress
47	Suti	None	S. Mahammad	Independent
48	Jangipur	None	A. Haque	Independent
49	Sagardighi	SC	A. C. Das	Indian National Congress
50	Lalgola	None	A. Sattar	Indian National Congress
51	Bhagabangola	None	S. Bhattacharyya	Indian National Congress
52	Nabagram	None	A. K. Bakshi	Indian National Congress
53	Murshidabad	None	S. K. A. Meerza	Indian National Congress
54	Jalangi	None	A. Rahaman	Indian National Congress
55	Domkal	None	M. A. Bari	CPI(M)
56	Naoda	None	M. Israil	Indian National Congress
57	Hariharpara	None	S. Ahmed	Indian National Congress
58	Berhampore	None	S. Bhattacharyya	Indian National Congress
59	Beldanga	None	A. Latif	Indian National Congress
60	Kandi	None	G. Trivedi	Indian National Congress
61	Khargram	SC	S. K. Mondal	Indian National Congress
62	Barwan	None	A. L. Roy	Independent
63	Bharatpur	None	S. Sinha	Indian National Congress
64	Karimpur	None	N. Sanyal	Bangla Congress
65	Tehatta	None	S. Banerji	Indian National Congress
66	Kaliganj	None	S. M. F. Rahman	Indian National Congress
67	Nakashipara	SC	M. C. Mondal	Bangla Congress
68	Chapra	None	J. Mojumder	Bangla Congress
69	Nabadwip	None	S. M. Nandy	Indian National Congress
70	Krishnagar West	None	A. Mukherjee	CPI(M)
71	Krishnagar East	None	K. K. Maitra	Samyukta Socialist Party
72	Hanskhali	SC	C. M. Sarkar	Bangla Congress
73	Santipur	None	K. Pal	CPI(M)
74	Ranaghat West	None	B. K. Chattopadhyay	Indian National Congress
75	Ranaghat East	SC	N. Sarkar	Communist Party of India
76	Chakdah	None	Haridas Mitra	Bangla Congress
77	Haringhata	None	B. M. Karim	Independent
78	Bagdaha	SC	A. L. Majumdar	All India Forward Bloc
79	Bongaon	None	K. Bhowmick	Indian National Congress
80	Gaighata	None	C. Mitra	Bangla Congress
81	Ashokenagar	None	S. K. Sen	Communist Party of India
82	Barasat	None	H. K. Basu	All India Forward Bloc
83	Rajarhat	SC	S. N. Das	CPI(M)
84	Deganga	None	J. Kabir	Bangla Congress
85	Habra	None	J. P. Mukherjee	Bangla Congress
86	Swarupnagar	None	J. R. Sen	Communist Party of India
87	Baduria	None	Q. A. Gaffar	Indian National Congress
88	Basirhat	None	A. B. Bandopadhyay	Communist Party of India
89	Hasnabad	None	H. N. Mazumdar	Bangla Congress
90	Hingalganj	SC	B. N. Brahmachari	Independent
91	Gosaba	SC	G. N. Mandal	Bharatiya Jana Sangh
92	Sandeshkhali	ST	D. N. Sinha	Indian National Congress
93	Haroa	SC	G. Pramanick	Bangla Congress
94	Basanti	None	S. Khatun	Indian National Congress
95	Canning	SC	A. C. Halder	Bangla Congress
96	Kultali	SC	P. Purkait	Independent
97	Joynagar	None	S. Banerjee	Independent
98	Baruipur	SC	K. R. Mandal	Samyukta Socialist Party
99	Sonarpur	None	G. Naskar	CPI(M)
100	Bhangar	None	A. Molla	Bangla Congress
101	Jadavpur	None	B. C. Guha	CPI(M)
102	Behala East	None	N. Mukherjee	CPI(M)
103	Behala West	None	R. Mukherjee	CPI(M)
104	Garden Reach	None	S. M. Abdullah	Indian National Congress
105	Maheshtola	None	S. C. Bhandari	CPI(M)
106	Budge Budge	None	K. B. R. Barman	CPI(M)
107	Bishnupur West	None	P. C. Roy	CPI(M)
108	Bishnupur East	SC	S. K. Naskar	CPI(M)
109	Falta	None	J. Roy	CPI(M)
110	Diamond Harbour	None	A. Q. Molla	CPI(M)
111	Magrahat East	SC	R. Pramanik	CPI(M)
112	Magrahat West	None	J. Abdin	Bangla Congress
113	Kulpi	SC	N. K. Haldar	Indian National Congress
114	Mathurapur	SC	H. Haldar	Bangla Congress
115	Patharpratima	None	R. Mandal	Independent
116	Kakdwip	None	H. Dhara	Indian National Congress
117	Sagar	None	T. Misra	Indian National Congress
118	Bijpur	None	J. C. Das	CPI(M)
119	Naihati	None	G. Bhattacharjee	Indian National Congress
120	Bhatpara	None	D. Beri	Indian National Congress
121	Noapara	None	S. Roy	Indian National Congress
122	Titagarh	None	K. K. Shukla	Indian National Congress
123	Khardah	None	S. K. Chakraborty	CPI(M)
124	Panihati	None	G. K. Bhattacharyya	CPI(M)
125	Kamarhati	None	R. R. Banerji	CPI(M)
126	Baranagar	None	Jyoti Basu	CPI(M)
127	Dum Dum	None	T. K. S. Gupta	CPI(M)
128	Cossipur	None	S. K. Paul	Indian National Congress
129	Shampukur	None	G. C. Dey	Indian National Congress
130	Jorabagan	None	H. P. Chatterjee	CPI(M)
131	Jorasanko	None	R. K. Poddar	Indian National Congress
132	Barabazar	None	Ishwar Das Jalan	Indian National Congress
133	Bowbazar	None	Bijoy Singh Nahar	Indian National Congress
134	Chowringhee	None	S. S. Ray	Indian National Congress
135	Kabithirtha	None	B. B. Paul	Indian National Congress
136	Alipore	None	M. Sanyal	Communist Party of India
137	Kalighat	None	B. Mitra	Indian National Congress
138	Rashbehariavenue	None	B. K. Banerjee	Independent
139	Tolly Gunge	None	N. S. Gupta	CPI(M)
140	Dhakuria	None	Somnath Lahiri	Communist Party of India
141	Ballygunge	None	J. B. Bhattacharya	Independent
142	Beliaghata South	SC	G. P. Roy	Indian National Congress
143	Entally	None	A. A. M. O. Ghani	Communist Party of India
144	Taltola	None	K. Hossain	Indian National Congress
145	Sealdah	None	Pratap Chandra Chunder	Indian National Congress
146	Vidyasagar	None	N. C. Roy	CPI(M)
147	Beliaghata North	None	K. P. Ghosh	CPI(M)
148	Manicktola	None	Ila Mitra	Communist Party of India
149	Burtola	None	N. Das	Independent
150	Belgachia	None	L. C. Sen	CPI(M)
151	Bally	None	S. N. Mukhrjee	Indian National Congress
152	Howrah North	None	S. K. Mukhrjee	Indian National Congress
153	Howrah Central	None	D. Mitra	Indian National Congress
154	Howrah South	None	B. K. Bhattacharja	Indian National Congress
155	Shibpur	None	M. Banerjee	Indian National Congress
156	Domjur	None	A. H. Mondal	Indian National Congress
157	Jagatballavpur	None	B. B. Bose	CPI(M)
158	Panchla	None	P. Mukhopadhya	Indian National Congress
159	Sankrail	SC	N. N. Bhunia	Indian National Congress
160	Uluberia North	SC	A. L. Majumdar	All India Forward Bloc
161	Uliberia South	None	B. D. Ghose	All India Forward Bloc
162	Shyampur	None	S. Bera	All India Forward Bloc
163	Bagnan	None	R. G. Choudhury	Indian National Congress
164	Kalyanpur	None	S. K. Mitra	Bangla Congress
165	Amta	None	N. Bhandari	CPI(M)
166	Udaynarayanpur	None	P. L. Maji	CPI(M)
167	Jangipara	None	M. N. Jana	CPI(M)
168	Chanditala	None	M. A. Latif	Independent
169	Uttarpara	None	M. Hazra	CPI(M)
170	Serampore	None	Gopal Das Nag	Indian National Congress
171	Champdani	None	B. Majumdar	Indian National Congress
172	Chandernagore	None	B. Mukherjee	CPI(M)
173	Singur	None	P. Pal	Indian National Congress
174	Haripal	None	A. C. Majumdar	Samyukta Socialist Party
175	Chinsurah	None	S. C. Ghose	All India Forward Bloc
176	Polba	None	B. Chattopadhayay	Indian National Congress
177	Balagarh	SC	H. K. Das	Indian National Congress
178	Pandua	None	R. Kundu	Indian National Congress
179	Dhaniakhali	SC	K. Saha	All India Forward Bloc
180	Tarakeswar	None	R. Chatterjee	Independent
181	Pursurah	None	S. M. Roy	Indian National Congress
182	Khanakul	SC	M. Saha	CPI(M)
183	Arambagh	None	A. K. Mukhopadhyaya	Bangla Congress
184	Goghat	SC	A. K. Biswas	All India Forward Bloc
185	Chandrakona	None	I. Roy	Indian National Congress
186	Ghatal	SC	N. R. Dal	CPI(M)
187	Daspur	None	B. C. Sasmal	Indian National Congress
188	Panskura West	None	R. K. Pramanik	Bangla Congress
189	Panskura East	None	G. Mukhopadhyay	Communist Party of India
190	Moyna	None	K. Bhowmik	Communist Party of India
191	Tamluk	None	A. K. Mukhopadhyay	Bangla Congress
192	Mahishadal	None	S. K. Bhara	Bangla Congress
193	Sutahata	SC	M. C. Das	Bangla Congress
194	Nandigram	None	B. C. Panda	Communist Party of India
195	Narghat	None	P. K. Gayen	Bangla Congress
196	Bhagbanpur	None	A. Maiti	Indian National Congress
197	Khajuri	SC	B. Paik	Indian National Congress
198	Contai North	None	M. L. Das	Indian National Congress
199	Contai South	None	S. C. Das	Praja Socialist Party
200	Ramnagar	None	T. Pradhan	Indian National Congress
201	Egra	None	B. Pahari	Praja Socialist Party
202	Mugberia	None	B. Maity	Bangla Congress
203	Pataspur	None	K. D. Mahapatra	Communist Party of India
204	Pingla	None	G. Samanta	Communist Party of India
205	Debra	None	K. Chakraborty	Bangla Congress
206	Keshpur	SC	R. K. Doloi	Indian National Congress
207	Garhbeta East	SC	K. K. Chalak	Indian National Congress
208	Garhbeta West	None	P. Sinharay	Indian National Congress
209	Salbani	None	A. R. Mahato	Bangla Congress
210	Midnapur	None	K. C. Ghose	Communist Party of India
211	Kharagpur	None	N. Choubey	Communist Party of India
212	Kharagpur Local	None	D. Das	Communist Party of India
213	Narayangarh	None	K. D. Roy	Indian National Congress
214	Dantan	None	D. N. Das	Bangla Congress
215	Keshiari	ST	B. C. Tudu	Indian National Congress
216	Nayagram	ST	J. Hansda	Bangla Congress
217	Gopiballavpur	None	D. Kar	Samyukta Socialist Party
218	Jhargram	None	P. C. Ghosh	Independent
219	Binpur	ST	M. C. Saren	Indian National Congress
220	Banduan	ST	K. Majhi	Independent
221	Manbazar	None	G. Mahato	Independent
222	Balarampur	ST	G. Majhi	Independent
223	Arsha	None	B. Mukherjee	Indian National Congress
224	Jhalda	None	C. Mahato	All India Forward Bloc
225	Jaipur	None	R. K. Mahato	Indian National Congress
226	Purulia	None	B. B. D. Gupta	Independent
227	Para	SC	S. Bauri	Bangla Congress
228	Raghunathpur	SC	N. Bauri	Indian National Congress
229	Kashipur	None	S. N. S. Deo	Indian National Congress
230	Hura	None	S. Ojha	Independent
231	Taldangra	None	P. Mukhopadhyay	Indian National Congress
232	Raipur	ST	B. Saren	Bangla Congress
233	Ranibandh	ST	B. Hemran	Indian National Congress
234	Indpur	SC	B. B. Maji	Indian National Congress
235	Chhatna	None	J. Koley	Indian National Congress
236	Gangjalghati	SC	G. Maji	Bangla Congress
237	Barjora	None	A. Chatterjee	Indian National Congress
238	Bankura	None	S. Mitra	Indian National Congress
239	Onda	None	S. Dutta	Indian National Congress
240	Vishnupur	None	B. C. Mandal	Indian National Congress
241	Kotulpur	None	S. Sarkar	Bangla Congress
242	Indas	SC	P. C. Mal	Bangla Congress
243	Sonamukhi	SC	K. Saha	Indian National Congress
244	Hirapur	None	S. Ghatak	Indian National Congress
245	Kulti	None	J. Sharma	Indian National Congress
246	Barabani	None	M. Upadhyay	Indian National Congress
247	Asansol	None	G. R. Mitra	Indian National Congress
248	Raniganj	None	H. Roy	CPI(M)
249	Jamuria	SC	T. Mondal	Samyukta Socialist Party
250	Ukhra	SC	H. Mondal	Indian National Congress
251	Durgapur	None	D. K. Mazumdar	CPI(M)
252	Faridpur	None	M. Baksi	Bangla Congress
253	Ausgram	SC	K. C. Halder	CPI(M)
254	Bhatar	None	S. Hazra	Indian National Congress
255	Galsi	None	P. C. Roy	Independent
256	Burdwan North	None	Syed Shahedullah	CPI(M)
257	Burdwan South	None	S. B. Choudhury	Indian National Congress
258	Khandaghosh	SC	P. Dhibar	
259	Raina	None	D. Tah	Praja Socialist Party
260	Jamal Pur	SC	P. Pramanik	Indian National Congress
261	Memari	None	P. Bishayee	Indian National Congress
262	Kalna	None	H. K. Konar	CPI(M)
263	Nadanghat	None	P. C. Goswami	Indian National Congress
264	Manteswar	None	N. C. Chaudhuri	Indian National Congress
265	Purbasthali	None	L. Hazra	CPI(M)
266	Katwa	None	S. Chowdhury	CPI(M)
267	Mangalkot	None	N. Sattar	Indian National Congress
268	Ketugram	SC	P. Mandal	Indian National Congress
269	Nanur	SC	S. Jash	Indian National Congress
270	Bolpur	None	R. K. Sinha	Independent
271	Labpur	None	S. Bandyopadhyay	Indian National Congress
272	Dubrajpur	None	K. N. Bandopadhyay	Independent
273	Rajnagar	SC	S. Mandal	All India Forward Bloc
274	Suri	None	B. Bandopadhyay	Indian National Congress
275	Mahammad Bazar	None	N. Ghosh	Indian National Congress
276	Mayureswar	SC	K. Saha	Indian National Congress
277	Rampurhat	None	S. S. Mondal	All India Forward Bloc
278	Hansan	SC	S. Prasad	Indian National Congress
279	Nalhati	None	G. Mahiuddin	Independent
280	Murarai	None	B. Ahamad	Independent

== Post-Poll Alliance ==
United Front led by Ajoy Mukherjee formed the Government. United Front was the combination of People's United Left Front, an electoral combination of CPI, the Bangla Congress, AIFB and BPI with United Left Front, comprising CPI(M), SSP, SUC, MFB, RCPI, WPI and the RSP.
