= Hassan Nasiem Siddiquie =

Indian marine geologist

Hassan Nasiem Siddique
- Born: 20 July 1934; Bijnor, Uttar Pradesh, India
- Died: 14 November 1986 (aged 52); Goa, India
- Education: Osmania University; Aligarh Muslim University; Shirshov Institute of Oceanology
- Known for: Geological studies on Bay of Bengal and the Arabian Sea and Antrartica Mission
- Awards: 1978 Shanti Swarup Bhatnagar Prize; 1983 Padma Shri; 1986 Goa State Award; National Mineral Award
- Scientific career
- Fields: Marine geology
- Workplaces: National Institute of Oceanography; Geological Survey of India

Hassan Nasiem Siddique (20 July 1934 – 14 November 1986) was an Indian marine geologist and the director of the National Institute of Oceanography. He was the deputy leader of the first Indian expedition to the Antarctica during 1981–82. He was known for his geological studies on Bay of Bengal and the Arabian Sea and was an elected fellow of the Indian National Science Academy, Geological Society of India, Association of Exploration Geophysicists and the National Academy of Sciences, India. The Council of Scientific and Industrial Research, the apex agency of the Government of India for scientific research, awarded him the Shanti Swarup Bhatnagar Prize for Science and Technology, one of the highest Indian science awards for his contributions to Earth, Atmosphere, Ocean and Planetary Sciences in 1978. The Government of India awarded him the fourth highest Indian civilian honour of Padma Shri in 1983.

== Biography ==
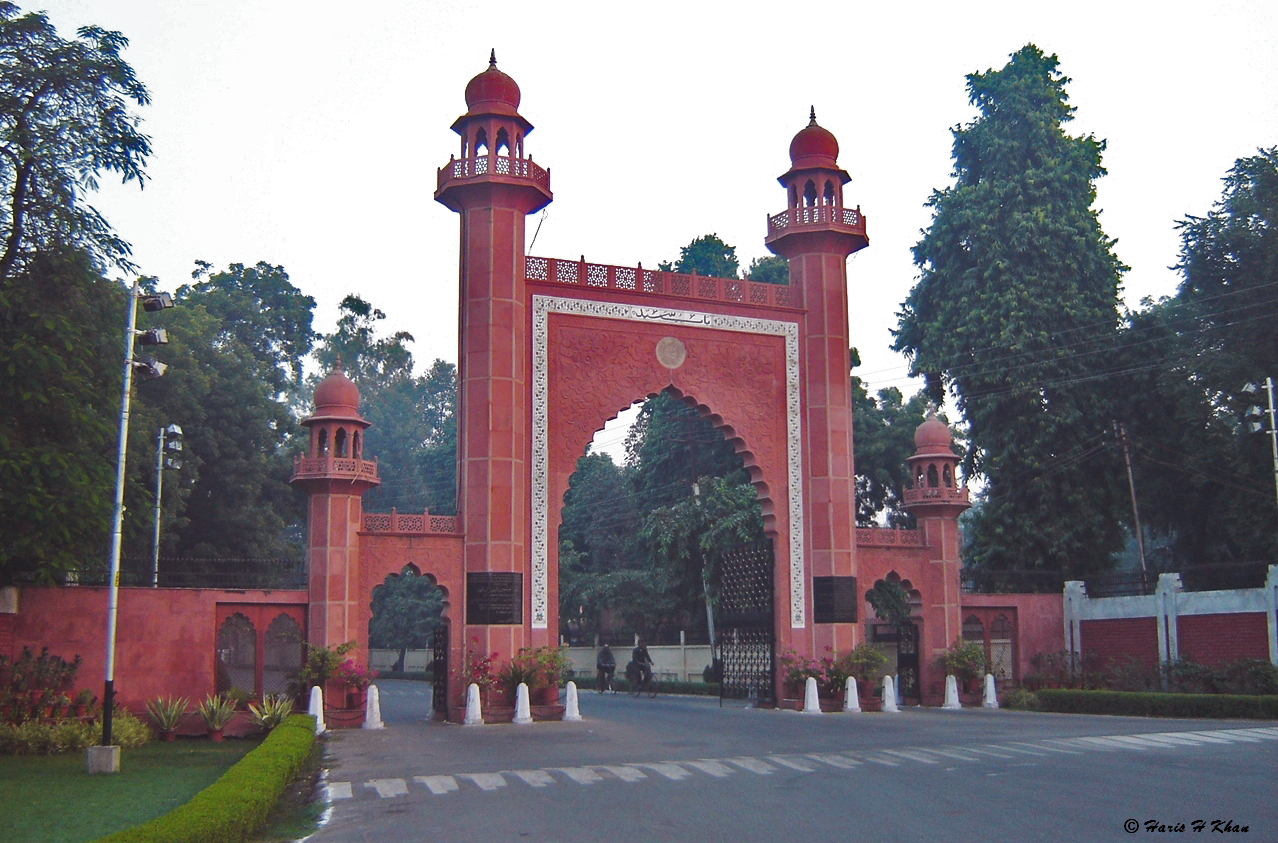
Aligarh Muslim University

H. N. Siddiquie was born on 20 July 1934 to M. A. Siddiquie, a civil surgeon and his homemaker wife, Ahemedi Begum as the eldest of their 6 sons and two daughters in Bijnor in the Indian state of Uttar Pradesh. His early education was at the Government Higher Secondary School, Adilabad and after matriculation in 1949, he completed his intermediate studies at Osmania University in 1951. Thereafter he joined Aligarh Muslim University (AMU) from where he completed his graduate degree in science in 1954. It was during this period, his father died but he continued his studies at AMU to obtain a master's degree in geology in 1956 and pursued his doctoral studies at the university but his doctoral degree came years later when the university awarded him the degree of Doctor of Philosophy while he was serving National Institute of Oceanography. His career started at Geological Survey of India (GSI) in 1956 at their Ground Water Exploration Division and Research Laboratories. He served GSI for over 17 years during which period he served as a senior geologist during 1966–73 and had a training stint at Shirshov Institute of Oceanology, Moscow. When the Government of India established National Institute of Oceanography (NIO) in 1973, he moved to the institute's Goa headquarters as a Grade-E scientist and the head of the Geological Oceanography Division. He served NIO in different capacities such as Grade-F Scientist and deputy director before becoming the director of the institute in 1985.

Siddiquie was married to Talat, and the couple had a daughter and two sons. He was 52 years old when he died in harness on 14 November 1986 succumbing a massive heart attack, the second one in a span of one year.

== Legacy ==
National Institute of Oceanography, Goa

Siddiquie's principal areas of operation were the Arabian Sea, Bay of Bengal and the Antarctica and his efforts may be categorized under seven heads viz. exploration of petroleum and minerals, infrastructure development, exploration of ploymetallic nodules, studies on sediments, studies on Foraminifera, paleoclimatic studies and Antarctica expedition. He was associated with several oil projects which include piping route identification, bathymetric and shallow seismic surveys and post-lay surveys in Bombay High, Bassein-Gujarat line, and Butcher Island routes for Oil and Natural Gas Commission and the Mahanadi delta survey for Oil India. For Port Trust Board of India, he conducted surveys for the ports of Mormugao, Visakhapatnam, Mangalore and Karwar. He was credited with the initiation of managanese nodule program in India and this coordinated program was reported to have earned India a place among the seven registered Pioneer Investors of the International Seabed Authority of the United Nations. The first bottom sediment map of the Arabian Sea and the Bay of Bengal was prepared under his supervision which served as a guide for future explorations in the region. The map identified the presence of Foraminifera, a class of amoeboid protists, which indicated the marine pollution levels and the resources of calcareous sediments in Lakshadeep sea. His studies on Lakshadeep offshores also assisted in widening the understanding of about the origin of the Chagos-Laccadive Ridge. He was the deputy leader of the first Indian expedition to Antarctica, under the leadership of Syed Zahoor Qasim and he coordinated the marine science programs for Dakshin Gangotri, the permanent Indian station in the southernmost continent. His studies and researches have been documented by way of a number peer-reviewed articles; (Note: Please see Selected bibliography section) ResearchGate, an online repository of scientific articles has listed 14 of them. He also mentored seven doctoral scholars in their studies.

Siddiquie was associated with the Indian government agencies such as Ocean Science and Technology Board and National Council of Science Museums and was a member of the International Union of Geodesy and Geophysics and Jadavpur University Geological Society in 1983 and 1984 respectively. He sat in the council of Association of Exploration Geophysicists in 1985 and served as the vice-chair of the Training, Education and Mutual Assistance (TEMA) (1984–85) and Improved uses of Research Vessels workshop (1984), both organized by of the Intergovernmental Oceanographic Commission/UNESCO. He was also a member of IOC/UNESCO Guiding Group of Experts for the Programme Ocean Science and Non-Living Resources (OSNLR). On the educational front, he served as a member of the research and advisory council of the National Geophysical Research Institute, the boards of studies of Andhra University, Cochin University of Science and Technology, Mangalore University and Bombay University, the planning board of Kashmir University and the executive council of Goa University. He also served as a member of the editorial boards of Proceedings of the Indian Academy of Sciences and Indian Journal of Marine Sciences.

== Awards and honors ==
The Council of Scientific and Industrial Research awarded the Shanti Swarup Bhatnagar Prize, one of the highest Indian science awards, in 1978. The Government of India included him the Republic Day honors list for the fourth highest civilian award of the Padma Shri in 1983. The same year, he was elected by the Indian National Science Academy as their fellow. He was also an elected fellow of the National Academy of Sciences, India (1984), Geological Society of India and Association of Exploration Geophysicists (1982). He was also a recipient of the National Mineral Award and the State Award of the Government of Goa, which he received in 1986. Indian Geophysical Union has instituted an annual award oration, Dr. H. N. Siddique Memorial Lecture in Siddique 's honor.

== Selected bibliography ==
- H. N. Siddiquie (1963). "The Jodhpur-Malani Divide Separating the Barmer and Jaisalmer Basins". Journal of the Geological Society of India. 4.
- H. N. Siddiquie, R. N. Sukheswala (December 1976). "Occurrence of Rhyolytic Tuffs at Deep Sea Drilling Project Site 219 on the Laccadive Ridge". Journal of the Geological Society of India. 17 (4).
- H.N. Siddiquie (November 1980). "The ages of the storm beaches of the Lakshadweep". Marine Geology. 38 (4): a. doi:10.1016/0025-3227(80)90002-X.
- H. N. Siddiquie, G. C. Bhattacharya, M. C. Pathak, S. Z. Qasim (January 1983). "Indira Mount — An Underwater Mountain in the Antarctic Ocean". Marine Geology.
- H. N. Siddiquie, S. M. Karisiddaiah, V. Subrahmanyam (December 1987). "A Note on the Occurrence of Ortho-Amphibolites on the Inner Shelf off Bhatkal, West Coast of India". Journal of the Geological Society of India. 30 (6).

== See also ==
- Indian Antarctic Program
- International Seabed Authority
- Syed Zahoor Qasim
- Chagos-Laccadive Ridge
