= Jadubayra =

Jaduboyra
- Village
- Location within Khulna division Location within Bangladesh
- Coordinates: 23.835314°N 89.226427°E
- Country: Bangladesh
- Division: Khulna
- District: Kushtia
- Upazila: Kumarkhali

Area
  - Total: 2.41 km^{2} (0.93 sq mi)

Population (2022)
  - Total: 6,149
  - Density: 2,550/km^{2} (6,610/sq mi)
- Postal code: 7011
- Website: Jaduboyra Union

Jaduboyra is a settlement located near Kumarkhali town and the headquarters of Jaduboyra Union. It is situated on the bank of the Gorai River in Kumarkhali Upazila, Kushtia District. A permanent police camp under Kumarkhali Thana is located here.

== History ==
Descendants of Parshuram Panchanan had lived in Jaduboyra. Heramba Chandra Maitra was born here in 1857. At that time, it was a village of Pabna District under Kumarkhali subdivision. In 1871, it was incorporated into Nadia District. Purna Chandra Lahiri, born in 1872, was a resident of this village. A building known as "Lahiri Bari" still exists in the village. He contributed to the establishment of Jaduboyra High School in 1902. The maternal home of the Indian revolutionary Khudiram Bose was also in Jaduboyra. According to popular belief, Khudiram Bose was arrested from this Lahiri residence.

== Notable people ==
- Amar Krishna Ghosh — Bengali revolutionary
- Atul Krishna Ghosh — Bengali revolutionary
- Jagannath Majumdar — Member of West Bengal Legislative Assembly
- Purna Chandra Lahiri — Bengali police officer
- Heramba Chandra Maitra — Prominent Brahmo Samaj leader and Bengali scholar
