= All India Democratic Students' Organisation =

Indian students organisation

All India Democratic Students' Organisation (AIDSO) is a student organisation in India. It was founded on 28 December 1954. AIDSO demands scientific, secular and democratic education for all. Its motto is struggle, unity, progress.

Website : https://www.aidso.in

== Basic outlook ==
The AIDSO aims to fight against injustice, oppression and exploitation and promote social transformation. It considers the socialist transformation of society for achieving this liberation and justice.

== Aims and objectives ==
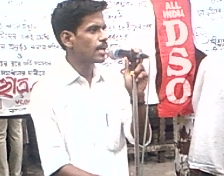
An AIDSO worker is addressing in a public gathering

The primary objective of the AIDSO is to organise student movements against the anti-education policies of the central and state governments as well as other authorities concerned, and for the "establishment of a scientific, secular, democratic education system".It considers an anti capitalist socialist revolution necessary for achieving this.

== Movements and protests ==
The AIDSO was formed on 28 December 1954. In the late 50s, a large student movement formed in West Bengal against a seat restriction scheme. The AIDSO played a crucial role In this movement. In 1974, AIDSO held the Cuttack Conference where the organisation emerged in a new form with an All India character, with representation from 8 states.

The AIDSO played a role during the Emergency of 1975–76. Several members were involved in protesting against bus and tram fare increases in West Bengal in the 1980s. Manik Burman, a school student and AIDSO worker, and Rabi Ghosh, a leading AIDSO organiser, sustained severe bullet injuries. In Purulia Habul Rajak an AIDSO worker, and Sovaram Modak, died after being shot by police. AIDSO opposed NPE 86 and organised national protests.

In Kerala, the AIDSO was part of a protracted movement against the DPEP or SSA.

Recently the AIDSO has organised a national movement against the government policies of commercialisation of education, bringing education under the purview of GATS, the introduction of sex education at school level and the policy of SEZ (Special Economic Zones).

AIDSO supported VTU students movement to abolish year back and critical year back system for students studying in old scheme and also providing supplementary for students of CBCS scheme. Statewide VTU colleges voluntary bundh received exceptionally well response from students and more than 160 engineering colleges were completely shut down. Students had a massive protest near Mysore bank circle, Bangalore.

AIDSO organised country level protest against Semester System & choice based credit system (CBCS).

During the 2024 Bangladesh quota reform movement, AIDSO organized a protest in Kolkata to support Bangladeshi students.

AIDSO was part of the first janthar madhar movement of 2026 against the neet paper leak and demanding the resignation of the union education minister dharmedra pradhan.

It is also taking an active part in the anti-CEC protest of 2026.

== Leadership ==
- President Com. Sourav Ghosh
- General Secretary Com.Shibasish Praharaj

Kerala state president - Dr.Aleena s Kerala state secretary - Adv.Aparna.R

== See also ==
- SUCI(C)
- AIDYO
- NEP-2020
