= Cooch Behar Dakshin Assembly constituency =

Vidhan Sabha constituency in West Bengal, India

Cooch Behar Dakshin
- Constituency No. 4 for the West Bengal Legislative Assembly
- Interactive Map Outlining Cooch Behar Dakshin Assembly Constituency

Constituency details
- Country: India
- Region: East India
- State: West Bengal
- District: Cooch Behar
- Lok Sabha constituency: Cooch Behar (SC)
- Established: 1951
- Total electors: 214,440
- Reservation: None

Member of Legislative Assembly
- 18th West Bengal Legislative Assembly
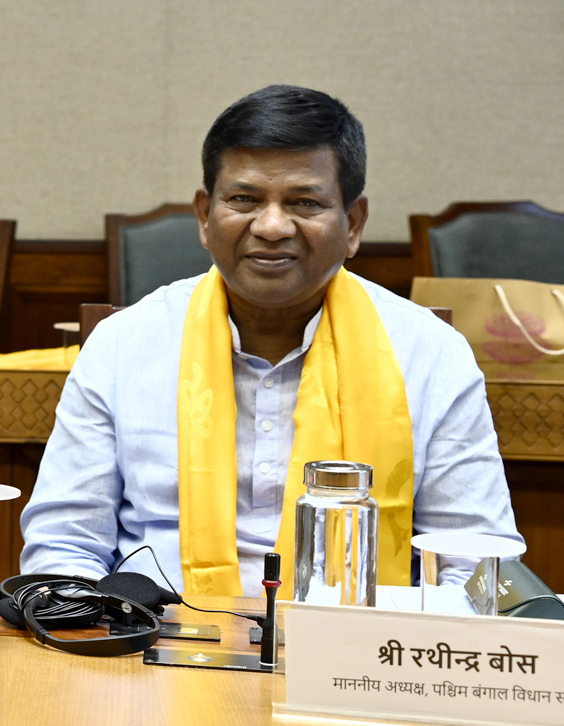
- Incumbent Rathindra Bose
- Party: Bharatiya Janata Party
- Elected year: 2026
- Preceded by: Nikhil Ranjan Dey

Cooch Behar Dakshin Assembly constituency is an assembly constituency in Cooch Behar district in the Indian state of West Bengal.

== Overview ==
As per orders of the Delimitation Commission, No. 4 Cooch Behar Dakshin Assembly constituency covers Cooch Behar municipality and Chandamari, Chilkirhat, Falimari, Ghughumari, Haribhanga, Moyamari, Patchhara, Putimari Fuleswari and Suktabari gram panchayats of Cooch Behar I community development block.

Cooch Behar Dakshin Assembly constituency is part of No. 1 Cooch Behar (Lok Sabha constituency) (SC).

== Members of the Legislative Assembly ==
=== Cooch Behar ===
| Year | Name | Party |
|---|---|---|
| 1951 | Maziruddin Ahmed | Indian National Congress |
| 1951 | Jatindra Nath Singha Sarkar | Indian National Congress |
| 1957 | Maziruddin Ahmed | Indian National Congress |
| 1957 | Satish Chandra Roy Singha | Indian National Congress |

=== Cooch Behar North ===
| Year | Name | Party |
|---|---|---|
| 1962 | Sunil Dasgupta | All India Forward Bloc |
| 1967 | M.R. Tar | Indian National Congress |
| 1969 | Bimal Kanti Basu | All India Forward Bloc |
| 1971 | Sunil Kar | Indian National Congress |
| 1972 | Sunil Kar | Indian National Congress |
| 1977 | Aparajita Goppi | All India Forward Bloc |
| 1982 | Aparajita Goppi | All India Forward Bloc |
| 1987 | Aparajita Goppi | All India Forward Bloc |
| 1991 | Bimal Kanti Basu | All India Forward Bloc |
| 1996 | Mihir Goswami | Indian National Congress |
| 2001 | Dipak Chandra Sarkar | All India Forward Bloc |
| 2006 | Dipak Chandra Sarkar | Communist Party of India (Marxist) |

=== Cooch Behar South ===
| Year | Name | Party |
|---|---|---|
| 1962 | Sunil Basunia | All India Forward Bloc |
| 1967 | Santosh Kumar Roy | Indian National Congress |
| 1969 | Santosh Kumar Roy | Indian National Congress |
| 1971 | Santosh Kumar Roy | Indian National Congress |
| 1972 | Santosh Kumar Roy | Indian National Congress |

=== Cooch Behar West ===
| Year | Name | Party |
|---|---|---|
| 1962 | Prasenjit Barman | Indian National Congress |
| 1967 | Prasenjit Barman | Indian National Congress |
| 1969 | Rajani Das | Indian National Congress |
| 1971 | Rajani Das | Indian National Congress |
| 1972 | Bimal Kanti Basu | All India Forward Bloc |
| 1982 | Bimal Kanti Basu | All India Forward Bloc |
| 1987 | Bimal Kanti Basu | All India Forward Bloc |
| 1991 | Soumindra Chandra Das | All India Forward Bloc |
| 1996 | Soumindra Chandra Das | All India Forward Bloc |
| 2001 | Akshay Thakur | All India Forward Bloc |
| 2006 | Akshay Thakur | All India Forward Bloc |

=== Cooch Behar Dakshin ===
| Year | Name | Party |
|---|---|---|
| 2011 | Akshay Thakur | All India Forward Bloc |
| 2016 | Mihir Goswami | All India Trinamool Congress |
| 2021 | Nikhil Ranjan Dey | Bharatiya Janata Party |
| 2026 | Rathindra Bose | Bharatiya Janata Party |

== Election results ==
=== 2026 ===
2026 West Bengal Legislative Assembly election: Cooch Behar Dakshin
| Party | Candidate | Votes | % | ±% |
|---|---|---|---|---|
| BJP | Rathindra Bose | 108,482 | 52.81 | ▲5.98 |
| AITC | Avijit De Bhowmik | 85,198 | 41.48 | ▼2.83 |
| AIFB | Nazmul Alom Sarkar | 3,137 | 1.53 | ▼3.71 |
| INC | Khokan Miah | 2,971 | 1.45 | New entry |
| NOTA | None of the Above | 1,770 | 0.86 | ▲0.11 |
| Majority | | 23,284 | 11.33 | ▲8.81 |
| Turnout | | 205,413 | 95.79 | ▲12.18 |
| Registered electors | | 214,440 | | ▼8.3 |
| BJP hold | | Swing | 4.4 | |

=== 2021 ===
West Bengal assembly elections, 2021: Cooch Behar Dakshin constituency
| Party | Candidate | Votes | % | ±% |
|---|---|---|---|---|
| BJP | Nikhil Ranjan Dey | 91,560 | 46.83 | |
| AITC | Avijit De Bhowmik | 86,629 | 44.31 | |
| AIFB | Akshay Thakur | 10,246 | 5.24 | |
| NOTA | None of the above | 1,464 | 0.75 | |
| Majority | | 4,931 | 2.52 | |
| Turnout | | 195,505 | 83.61 | |
| BJP gain from AITC | | Swing | | |

=== 2016 ===
In the 2016 election, Mihir Goswami of AITC defeated his nearest rival Debasis Banik of AIFB

West Bengal assembly elections, 2016: Cooch Behar Dakshin constituency
| Party | Candidate | Votes | % | ±% |
|---|---|---|---|---|
| AITC | Mihir Goswami | 82,849 | 46.24 | ▲1.07 |
| AIFB | Debasis Banik | 64,654 | 36.08 | ▼10.96 |
| BJP | Nikhil Ranjan Dey | 18,176 | 10.14 | ▲5.95 |
| BSP | Maya Majumder | 5,197 | 2.9 | |
| AMB | Amita Das | 2,703 | 1.51 | |
| NOTA | None of the above | 2,489 | 1.39 | |
| SUCI(C) | Nazma Khandakar | 1,678 | 0.94 | |
| Kamtapur People's Party (United) | Akik Hossain Chowdhury | 1,427 | 0.8 | |
| Majority | | 18,195 | 10.15 | ▲8.28 |
| Turnout | | 179,173 | 84.05 | ▲0.13 |
| AITC gain from AIFB | | Swing | | |

=== 2011 ===
In the 2011 election, Akshay Thakur of AIFB defeated his nearest rival Abdul Jalil Ahmed of Trinamool Congress.

West Bengal assembly elections, 2011: Cooch Behar Dakshin constituency
| Party | Candidate | Votes | % | ±% |
|---|---|---|---|---|
| AIFB | Akshay Thakur | 72,028 | 47.04 | ▼4.03 |
| AITC | Abdul Jalil Ahmed | 69,165 | 45.17 | ▲11.29 |
| BJP | Gayetri Kar | 6,419 | 4.19 | |
| Independent | Sanat Sen | 2,207 | 1.44 | |
| Independent | Shyamal Chandra Barman | 1,277 | 0.83 | |
| Majority | | 2,863 | 1.87 | |
| Turnout | | 153,115 | 83.92 | |
| AIFB hold | | Swing | | |

=== 2006 ===
In the 2006 and 2001 state assembly elections, Akshay Thakur of Forward Bloc won the Cooch Behar West seat defeating Abdul Jalil Ahmed and Soumendra Chandra Das (both of Trinamool Congress) respectively. Soumindra Chandra Das of Forward Bloc defeated Abdul Jalil Ahmed representing Congress in 1996 and Ramkrishna Pal of Congress in 1991. Bimal Kanti Basu of Forward Bloc defeated Shyamal Choudhury of Congress in 1987 and 1982, and Maqsudar Rahman of Congress in 1977.

=== 1972 ===
Sunil Kar of Congress won the Cooch Behar North in 1972 and 1971. Bimal Kanti Basu of Forward Bloc won it in 1969. M.R.Tar of Congress won it in 1967. Sunil Dasgupta of Forward Bloc won it in 1962. Santosh Kumar Roy of Congress won the Cooch Behar South seat in 1972, 1971, 1969 and 1967. Sunil Basunia of Forward Bloc won the seat in 1962. Rajani Das of Congress won the Cooch Behar West seat in 1972 and 1971. Prasenjit Barman of Congress won it in 1969 and 1967. The seat was not there prior to 1967.

=== 1957 ===
Cooch Behar was a joint seat in 1957. It was won by Maziruddin Ahmed and Satish Chandra Roy Singha (both of Congress). In independent India's first election in 1951, Maziruddin Ahmed and Jatindra Nath Singha Sarkar (both of Congress) won the Cooch Behar joint seat.
