= Proletarian Era =

- 1 March 2002 front page
- Type: Fortnightly newspaper
- Owner(s): Socialist Unity Centre of India (Communist)
- Editor-in-chief: Provash Ghosh
- Political alignment: Communism; Marxism–Leninism; Anti-revisionism
- Language: English
- Headquarters: Kolkata, West Bengal
- Website: sucicommunist.org/proletarian-era/

Proletarian Era is a fortnightly English newspaper published from Kolkata, West Bengal, India. It is the official English-language organ of the Socialist Unity Centre of India (Communist). It is published from Kolkata in English, with online editions. Shibdas Ghosh founded the newspaper. Nihar Mukherjee was its editor from 1976 to 2010. On his death, Provash Ghosh was elected as the General Secretary of SUCI (C) and the Editor in Chief of the newspaper.
