= Ganadabi =

Indian newspaper

- Owner: Socialist Unity Centre of India (Communist)
- Publisher: Socialist Unity Centre of India (Communist)
- Political alignment: Communism; Marxism–Leninism; Stalinism; Anti-revisionism
- Language: Bengali
- Headquarters: Kolkata
- Website: www.ganadabi.com

Ganadabi (People's Demand; Bengali: গণদাবি) is a weekly Bengali newspaper published from Kolkata, West Bengal, India. The paper is the Bengali organ of Socialist Unity Centre of India (Communist), a communist party in India.

== See also ==
- Ganashakti
- Jago Bangla
- Proletarian Era
