= Santosh Kumar Roy =

Santosh Kumar Roy may refer to:

- Santosh Kumar Roy (Assam politician), Indian politician
- Santosh Kumar Roy (West Bengal politician) (1926-2012), Indian politician
