= Nihar Mukherjee =

Indian politician

General Secretary of the Socialist Unity Centre of India (Communist)
- In office 1976–2010
- Preceded by: Shibdas Ghosh
- Succeeded by: Provash Ghosh

Personal details
- Born: 1920 Dhaka, Bengal Presidency, British India
- Died: 18 February 2010 (aged 89–90) Kolkata, West Bengal, India
- Party: Socialist Unity Centre of India

Nihar Mukherjee (1920–2010) was an Indian politician who served as General Secretary of the Socialist Unity Centre of India .

== Political career ==
He was a founding member of the party in 1948 and became the General Secretary after the death of Shibdas Ghosh in 1976. He was also the Editor-in-Chief of the Proletarian Era, the official newspaper of the organization.

Nihar Mukherjee Memorial Meeting held in Netaji Indoor Stadium in Kolkata on 3 March 2010

During Mukherjee's early political career, he was a leader of the Anushilan Samiti, where he came in close contact of Shibdas Ghosh. He was jailed during the Quit India movement for three years. Mukherjee played a decisive role in developing united left democratic movements in West Bengal. In 1962, he was detained in jail for one year under the National Security Act. Nihar Mukherjee died of cardiac arrest on 18 February 2010 in Kolkata. The party held a massive memorial meeting on 3 March 2010 to mourn the death of Nihar Mukherjee in the Netaji Indoor Stadium, Kolkata.
