= All India Krishak Khet Majdoor Sangathan =

All India Kisan Khet Majdoor Sangathan, AIKKMS is a peasant and agrarian labour movement in India, politically aligned with the Socialist Unity Centre of India (Communist). Satyawan from Haryana is the All India President and Sankar Ghosh from West Bengal is the All India General Secretary AIKKMS. AIKKMS was initially known as Krishak O Khetmajur Federation.

AIKKMS is active in various parts of North India, West Bengal, Karnataka, etc. AIKKMS is a member of AIKSCC (All India Kisan Sangarsh Coordination Committee) and members of the AIKSCC Coordination Committee.
