= Jago Bangla =

Indian newspaper

- Type: Daily
- Format: Broadsheet
- Owner: All India Trinamool Congress (2015-2026)
- Publisher: All India Trinamool Congress (2015 -2026)
- Editor: Sovandeb Chattopadhyay
- Founded: 2015
- Political alignment: Mouthpiece of Trinamool Congress (2015-2026)
- Language: Bengali
- Headquarters: Kolkata
- Website: aitcofficial.org/jago-bangla/ www.jagobangla.in

Jago Bangla is a Bengali-language daily newspaper published from Kolkata, West Bengal, India. The newspaper is an organ of All India Trinamool Congress and used by the party to convey its message to different parts of Bengal, specially rural Bengal. As of 2015, the newspaper had a circulation of 70,000 in West Bengal. Previously a weekly newspaper, it became a daily publication from 21 July 2021.

== See also ==
- Ganadabi
- Ganashakti
