= All India United Trade Union Centre =

Trade union in India

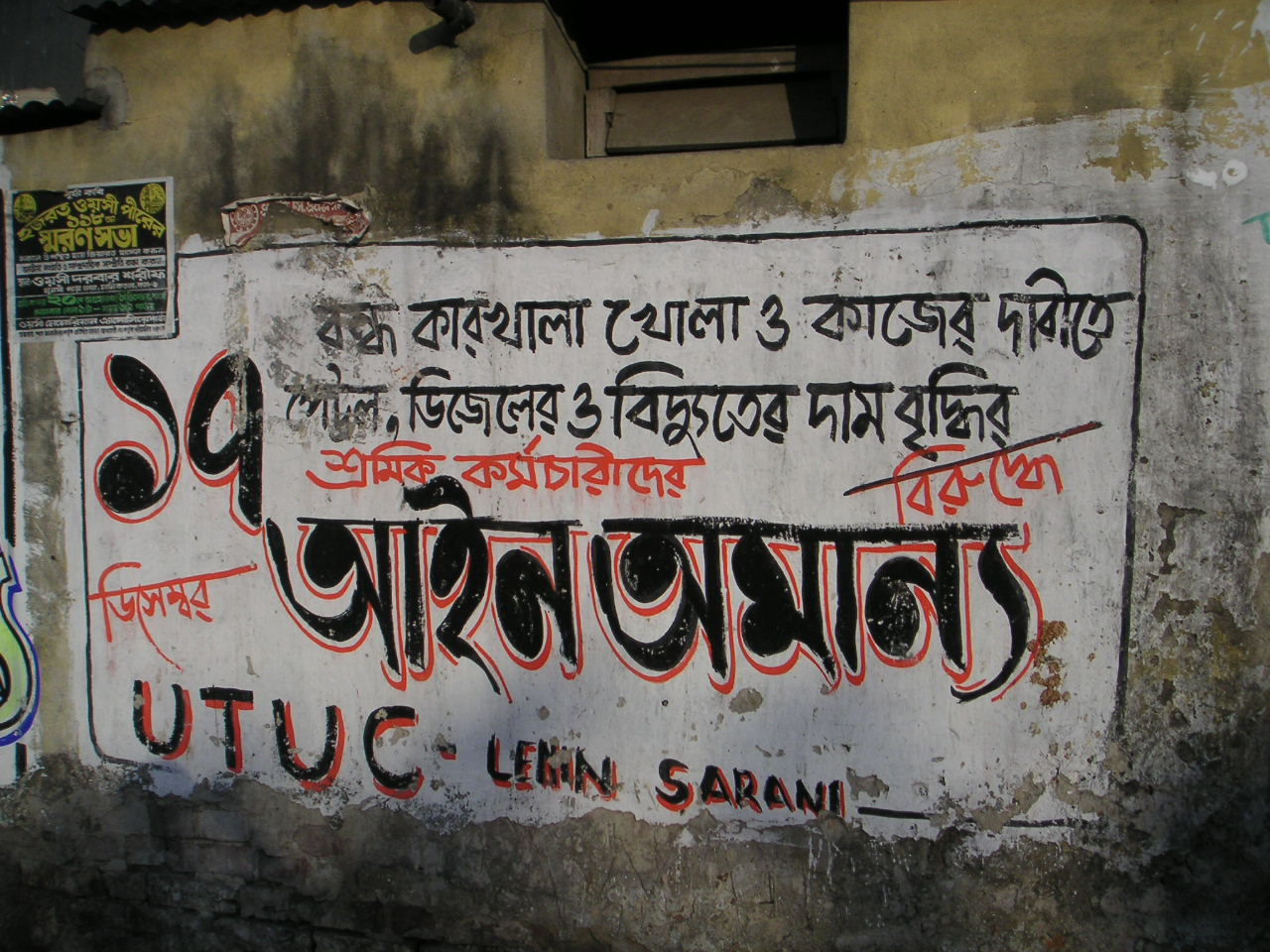
UTUC-LS mural in Kolkata

The All India United Trade Union Centre (AIUTUC), formerly known as United Trade Union Centre (Lenin Sarani) or UTUC-LS, is a central trade union organisation in India and the labour wing of the Socialist Unity Centre of India (Communist). Presently its activities are spread over 19 states. The organisation claims to have 600 affiliated unions, comprising an individual membership of over two million. It is the 6th largest trade union in India. According to provisional statistics from the Ministry of Labour, UTUC-LS had a membership of 1,368,535 in 2002.

== History ==
AIl India UTUC was founded at a conference held in Calcutta (now Kolkata) on 26–27 April 1958, following a split in the United Trade Union Congress. Initially it used the name UTUC, but in the general media it was referred to as UTUC (Dharamtala Street) (where it had its offices) to distinguish it from the original UTUC. In 1969, at the initiative of Subodh Banerjee, West Bengal State Committee President of the organisation and Labour Minister in anti-Congress United Front Government in the state, the name of the street was changed to 'Lenin Sarani'. Thus the new name of the organisation became UTUC (Lenin Sarani).

In the 17th UTUC (LS) conference held in Delhi in 1985 the organisation was renamed as 'United Trade Union Centre (Lenin Sarani)'. In the 18th conference held in 1992 in Calcutta 'Lenin Sarani' was un-bracketed, implying that it no longer referred to the name of the street where the office is located but became an integral part of the name of the organisation which was thereafter known as 'United Trade Union Centre-Lenin Sarani' (UTUC-LS). The 19th all India conference of the organisation held in Delhi on 27 March 2008 approved the change of name to All India United Trade Union Centre (All India UTUC).

AIUTUC is affiliated to the World Federation of Trade Unions.

== Activities ==
The All India UTUC is functioning in both formal and informal sectors. In informal sector, the most important segment where it has been working from the very inception, is agriculture. In the formal sectors All India UTUC has unions, federations and activities in basic, heavy and key industries and important service sectors like Iron and Steel, Engineering, Electricity, Coal and Non-Coal Mines, Railways, Port and Dock, Road-Transport, Banks and Financial Institutions, Insurance, Central and State Government Services. On the basis of its membership strength All India UTUC has been recognised as a Central Trade Union Organisation by the Government of India and has its representations in apex level tripartite committees as well as in International Labour Conferences (ILC) of the ILO.

== Leadership ==
- 'President' – K Radhakrishna
- 'General Secretary' – Shankar Dasgupta
