= Matiranjan Tar =

Matiranjan Tar was an Indian politician, belonging to the Indian National Congress. Tar was elected to the West Bengal Legislative Assembly from the Cooch Behar North constituency in the 1967 election. He obtained 17,440 votes (37.73%).

Tar lost the Cooch Behar North seat in the subsequent 1969 West Bengal Legislative Assembly election. Although Tar's vote share had increased to 21,514 votes (46.06%) he was defeated by the All India Forward Bloc candidate Bimal Kanti Basu.
