= All India Mahila Sanskritik Sangathan =

All India Mahila Samskritik Sanghatan (AIMSS) is the women's wing of the Socialist Unity Centre of India (Communist). AIMSS is active in 19 States. All India President and General Secretary is Keya De and Chabi Mohanty.

The Karnataka wing of AIMSS organised a women's meet in December 2024. In May 2022, along with other organisations, they opposed raising the marriageable age from 18 to 21 years. They are active in many states of India in advocating for women's issues.

Chaya Mukherjee addressing the Parliament March organized by AIMSS on the International Women's Day, 2010

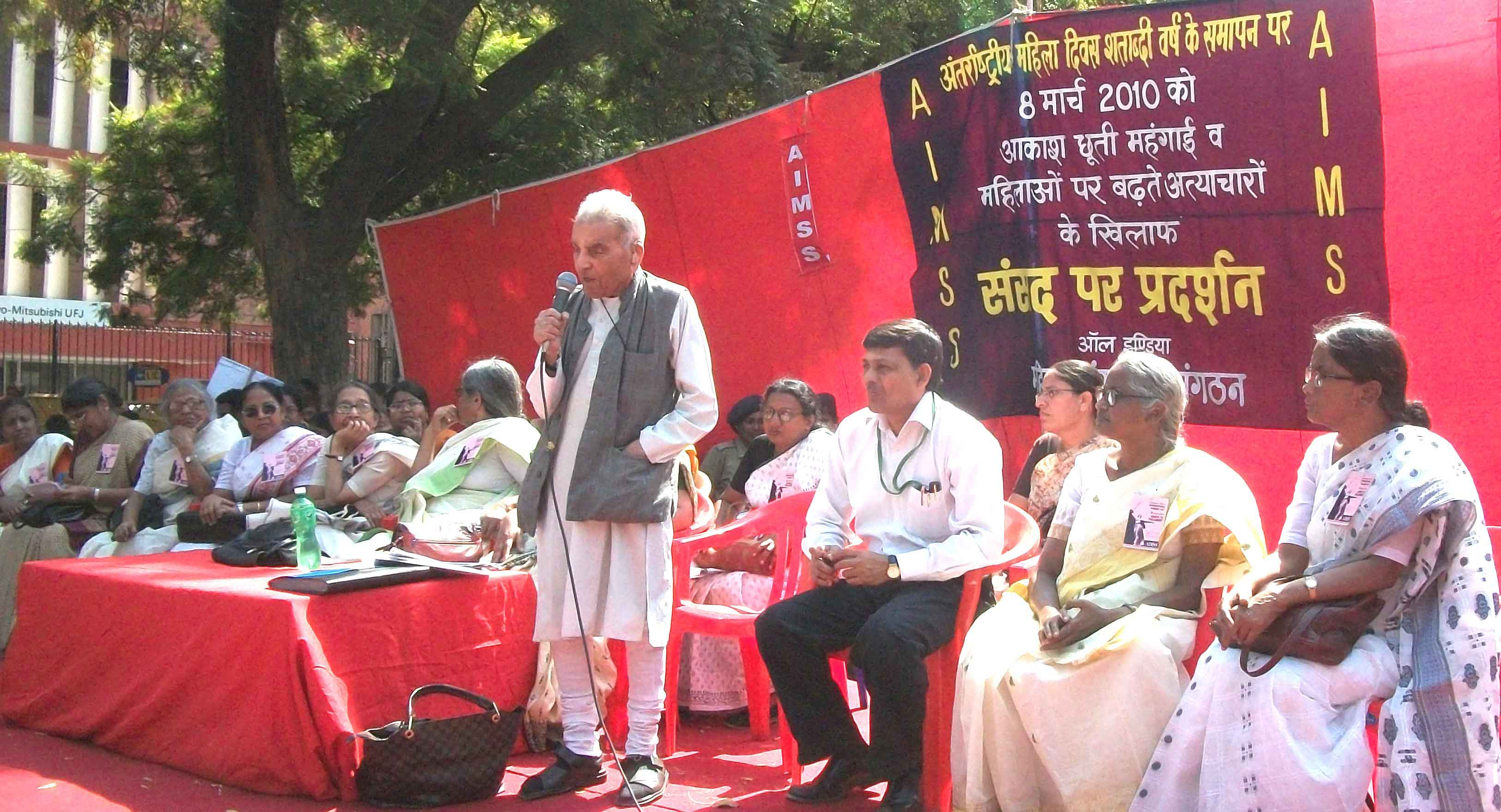
Justice (Rtd) Rajinder Sachar addressing the Parliament March organized by AIMSS on the International Women's Day, 2010. Seated to his left is Dr. Tarun Mondal, MP

== See also ==
- Krantikari Adivasi Mahila Sangathan
- Mahila Atma Raksha Samiti
- National Federation of Indian Women
- Socialist Unity Centre of India (Communist)
