= Santosh Roy =

Indian politician (1926–2012)

Santosh Kumar Roy (1926–2012) was an Indian politician from Cooch Behar, northern West Bengal, belonging to the Indian National Congress. He represented the Cooch Behar South constituency in the West Bengal Legislative Assembly 1967 to 1975. Roy was the West Bengal state government Public Works and Housing minister for a short stint in 1971 and then the Minister for Refugee Rehabilitation, Relief and Social Welfare from 1972 until his resignation in early 1975 following an investigation by the Wanchoo Commission. He was the chairman of the Jute Corporation of India for less than a year in 1976-1977, before returning to electoral politics and unsuccessfully contesting the 1977, 1982 and 1987 West Bengal elections. He was one of the secretaries of the Congress Party in West Bengal in the early 1980s.

== Biography ==
Roy was born in 1926 in Cooch Behar. As a student he became involved in political activities. As of 1965 he became the president of the East India Plywood Sramik Sangha Congress, a trade union based in Cooch Behar.

Roy was elected to the West Bengal Legislative Assembly from the Cooch Behar South constituency in the 1967, 1969, 1971 and 1972 elections. He served as Minister for Public Works Department and Housing in the short-lived cabinet of Ajoy Mukherjee formed after the 1971 election. In September 1971 the All India Congress Committee president D. Sanjivayya formed a 30-member ad hoc committee to lead the Congress Party in West Bengal, with Roy as one of its members.

He was named Minister-in-Charge for Refugee Rehabilitation, Relief and Social Welfare, including Tribal and Scheduled Castes Welfare, in the Siddhartha Shankar Ray cabinet formed after the 1972 election. As the state Relief Minister, Roy went on record denying the prevalence of famine in West Bengal.

Roy was one of five West Bengal state government ministers investigated by the Wanchoo Commission, a one-man commission led by Justice K.N. Wanchoo to investigate accusations on corruption and nepotism. The Wanchoo Commission found Roy guilty of having used his political influence to secure employment for his sister under the Social Welfare Board. And apart from the issues investigated by the Wanchoo Commission, Roy faced other cases and inquiries in the local press relating to his roles in the Cooch Behar District Central Co-operative Bank (for which he had served as president and secretary, which had now gone into moratorium) and the now closed Co-operative Rice Mill (he had at one point served as the chairman of its Board of Directors). Roy resigned from his ministerial post on 29 January 1975, following a special cabinet meeting reviewing the Wanchoo Commission report. Roy resigned from his seat in the West Bengal Legislative Assembly on 21 February 1975, vowing to prove his innocence regarding the accusations against him.

Roy served as the chairman of the Jute Corporation of India from 31 July 1976 and 20 April 1977. He contested the 1977 West Bengal Legislative Assembly election as the Congress(I) candidate in Natabari seat - finishing in second place with 12,486 votes (24.53%). As of the early 1980s he served as one of the secretaries of the West Bengal Pradesh Congress Committee(I). He again contested the Natabari seat in the 1982 West Bengal Legislative Assembly election, finishing in second place with 35,034 voters (43.57%). In the 1987 West Bengal Legislative Assembly election he again finished in second place in Natabari, with 41,487 votes (44.54%).

His hobbies included collecting rare books and manuscripts and reading. Roy died in 2012.
