= Communist Workers Party (India) =

Communist Workers Party was a political party in the Indian state of West Bengal. CWP was formed by Jyotibhushan Bhattacharya, when the Workers Party of India split in 1976. Bhattacharya was a professor of English at Calcutta University and in 1967 he had become the first non-Congress Education Minister of West Bengal. CWP used to publish the Bengali journal Gram-Nagar and an English monthly titled Agenda. CWP changed its name to Workers Party in 1993. Professor Jyoti Bhattacharya died in the year 1998. He was well known as an eminent scholar and a Marxist theoretician.
