= Bangla Jatiya Dal =

Bangla Jatiya Dal was a political party in West Bengal, India, led by Jahangir Kabir. It was a splinter group of Bharatiya Kranti Dal. Ahead of the 1969 West Bengal legislative assembly election, BJD sought to join the United Front. However, its entry into the United Front was barred by the Bangla Congress. Kabir's brother, Humayun Kabir had been instrumental in bringing down the UF ministry in 1967.

The BJD presented 16 candidates in 1969 assembly election. None, however, were elected. In total the BJD got 25081 votes.
