= Sankar Sen Ishore =

Indian politician

Sankar Sen Ishore was an Indian politician, belonging to the Indian National Congress. Sen Ishore was elected to the West Bengal Legislative Assembly from the Tufanganj constituency in the 1967 election, obtaining 27,283 votes (55.71%). He did not run for re-election in the 1969 polls.

He again contested the Tufanganj seat in the 1982 West Bengal Legislative Assembly election as the Congress Party candidate, finishing in second place with 35,192 votes (44.34%).
