= All India Democratic Youth Organisation =

Youth organization in India

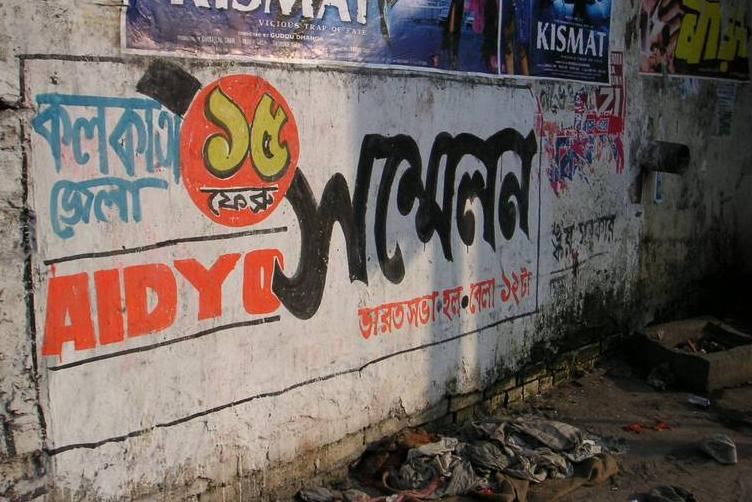
AIDYO mural, announcing its Kolkata District Conference

All India Democratic Youth Organisation is the youth wing of the Socialist Unity Centre of India (Communist).

All India Democratic Youth Organisation (AIDYO) was formed on 26 June 1966, with the stated purpose of uniting the youth of India to fight all social menaces and atrocities such as superstition, communalism, casteism, regionalism, religious fundamentalism, etc.

The All India President of the organisation is A Ramanjanappa Aldalli and the General Secretary is Prathibha Nayak.

AIDYO organises youth movements against various policies of the state and the central government which affects the youths who are analysed as anti-people, pro-capitalist, as per the ideology put forth by Shibdas Ghosh. The organisation strives to do away with what they analyse as decadent capitalist-imperialist culture and its degenerative influence (obscenity, vulgarity, obsession with sex, indulgence in narcotic alcoholism, etc.).

The organisation encourages the youth to observe the birth and death anniversaries of the great men of history who fought for secular democratic and revolutionary ideology in their time which is of social relevance even now.

Considering "street theatre" as a tool for social change, the organisation conducts street play festivals every year. The 17th Street Play Festival was held in Bangalore from 22 to 24 February 2013.
