= Nikhil Ranjan Dey =

Indian politician

Member of the West Bengal Legislative Assembly
- In office 2 May 2021 – 7 May 2026
- Preceded by: Mihir Goswami
- Succeeded by: Rathindra Bose
- Constituency: Cooch Behar Dakshin

Personal details
- Born: 12 March 1958 (age 68) Kotwali, West Bengal
- Party: Bharatiya Janata Party
- Education: Ram Bhola Higher Secondary school
- Profession: Politician

Nikhil Ranjan Dey is an Indian politician from BJP. In May 2021, he was elected as the member of the West Bengal Legislative Assembly from Cooch Behar Dakshin.

== Career ==
Dey is from Kotwali, Cooch Behar district. His father's name is Nirmal Kumar Dey. He passed Higher Secondary from Ram Bhola Higher Secondary school in 1974. He contested in 2021 West Bengal Legislative Assembly election from Cooch Behar Dakshin Vidhan Sabha and won the seat on 2 May 2021.
