= Socialist Unity Centre of India (Communist) =

- Abbreviation: SUCI(C)
- General Secretary: Provash Ghosh
- Founder: Shibdas Ghosh; Nihar Mukherjee
- Founded: 24 April 1948
- Split from: Revolutionary Socialist Party
- Headquarters: 48, Lenin Sarani, Kolkata, India
- Newspaper: Proletarian Era (English); Ganadabi (Bengali); Unity (Malayalam)
- Student wing: Democratic Students Organisation
- Youth wing: Democratic Youth Organisation
- Women's wing: Mahila Sanskritik Sanghathan
- Labour wing: United Trade Union Centre
- Peasant's wing: Krishak Khet Majdoor Sangathan
- Ideology: Anti-capitalism; Social conservatism; Shibdas Ghosh thoughts
- ECI status: Registered – Unrecognized
- Seats in Rajya Sabha: 0 / 245
- Seats in Lok Sabha: 0 / 543

Website
- www.sucic.org

Socialist Unity Centre of India (Communist) (SUCI(C)), formerly known as Socialist Unity Centre of India (SUCI) or Socialist Unity Centre (SUC), is an anti-capitalist and socially conservative political party in India. The party was founded by Shibdas Ghosh and Nihar Mukherjee in 1948.

== History ==
=== Formation ===
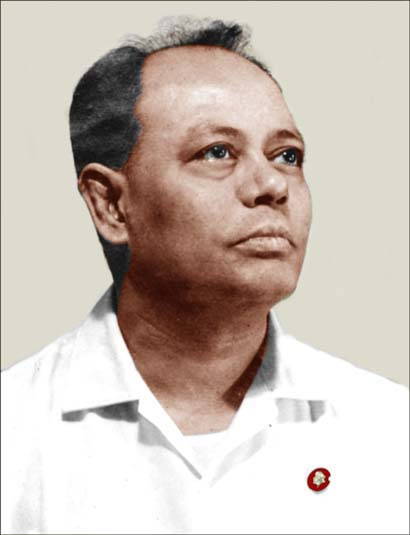
Shibdas Ghosh, Founder General Secretary of SUCI

Centring some ideological tensions and debates, about thirty members of Revolutionary Socialist Party were ousted from RSP and this faction along with the group led by Sudhindra Pramanik who was a former associate of M. N. Roy, one group led by Nepal Bhattacharjee, founder of Workers and Peasants League and a faction led by Biren Bhattarcharjee claimed to form a propagandist Platform of Action (POA) as Socialist Unity Centre on 1 May 1946 with Shibdas Ghosh and Makhan Chatterjee as joint convenors. 24 Pargana district committee led by Subodh Banerjee also joined the faction. But detailed analysis says that Platform of Action was most likely formed after Independence of India. The leaders of the organisations and groups of the POA couldn't arrive ideological coherency and then the faction led by Shibdas Ghosh and Nihar Mukherjee gave rise to a political party named Socialist Unity Centre on 24 April 1948.

An 11-member central committee was formed consisting of Shibdas Ghosh, Subodh Banerjee, Nihar Mukherjee, Sachin Banerjee, Pritish Chanda, Hiren Sarkar, Rathin Sen, Promod Singha Roy, Monoranjan Banerjee, Radheshyam Saha and Tribeni Bardhan with Shibdas Ghosh as the General Secretary. Although SUCI claims at present that Hiren Sarkar was one of the members of the first central committee, the party's old documents do not substantiate this. It is speculated that Hiren Sarkar was included in the central committee sometimes after 1954.

=== Early years (1948-70) ===
The party took part in different protests against tram fare rise, proposed merger of Bihar and West Bengal and joined Food Movement of 1959–66.

Even though SUCI considers elections as bourgeois tactics, it took part in parliamentary elections from its inception.

SUCI formed United Left Front of 1957 ahead of the 1957 West Bengal Legislative Assembly election. The other constituents of the front were Bolshevik Party of India, the Democratic Vanguard in India and the Republican Party of India. But SUC and its allies lost in all the contested seats.

During the prevailing food crisis in West Bengal, SUC joined United Left Front of 1962 led by Communist Party of India. Despite contesting 11 seats as part of ULF–1962 in 1962 West Bengal Legislative Assembly election, SUC was defeated in all seats and merely got 69,844 votes.

In 1967 Indian general election, Chitta Roy of SUC won from Jaynagar Lok Sabha constituency as an independent candidate. In 1967 West Bengal Legislative Assembly election, SUC as part of Communist Party of India (Marxist) led ULF–1967 and won 4 seats. The front merged with People's United Left Front to form United Front which formed the first non-Congress government in the state.

SUCI was given the Labour Ministry in the United Front government and Subodh Banerjee became Labour Minister who introduced Gherao principle. United Front issued circular stating that police would not be able to interfere in gheraos (besieging blockades) unless having the permission of the Ministry of Labour. This led to frequent strikes & protests against big businessmen and industrialists by labour unions causing them to gradually shift their operations out of the state. Kolkata High Court nullified this principle twice. Bangla Congress leaders requested the-then Deputy Chief Minister Jyoti Basu to remove Subodh Banerjee from the Labour Ministry and this proposal was rejected by Basu. When Chief Minister Ajoy Mukherjee himself sat on a hunger strike at Curzon Park in front of Writer's Building demanding Banerjee's resignation, CPI(M) and SUCI workers interrupted his demonstration.

SUCI won 7 seats and got 1.53% votes 1969 West Bengal Legislative Assembly election being part of United Front. Subodh Banerjee was now made the Minister of Department of Public Works and Protiva Mukherjee was made Minister of State for Roads and Road Development.

When Ajoy Mukherjee presented his resignation on 16 March 1970, Jyoti Basu met Governor Santiswarup Dhawan and he requested that the CPI(M), being the largest party, be allowed to form the government. But SUCI along with Congress, Bangla Congress, CPI and Forward Bloc met him and advised him not to give CPI(M) that opportunity and the Governor recommended President's rule leading to the fall of the second United Front government.

=== Later years (1971-2006) ===
Before 1971 West Bengal Legislative Assembly election, SUCI joined United Left Democratic Front led by CPI. The front failed to reach a seat-sharing agreement with the Bangla Congress, but managed to agree to some seat-sharings with the Congress (R). SUCI won 7 seats in the election.

SUCI, in 1972 West Bengal Legislative Assembly election, won one Vidhan Sabha seat. It was a part of CPI(M) led alliance in the election.

SUCI won 4 seats in 1977 and won 2 seats — Jaynagar and Kultali in 1982 also and held those two seats till 2006.

The party also represented Jashipur Assembly constituency of Odisha three times in 1985–90, 1995-2000 and 2004–09. Nalini Ranjan Singh of SUCI won Kanti Assembly constituency from 1980 to 1990. In 1990, he won in Janata Dal ticket.

One of the major campaigns of the party in West Bengal has been its agitations against the Left Front government.

SUCI protested against bus fare hike in 1983 and called for Bangla Bandh (Bengal Strike) on 31 August 1990 and organised protest against electricity price rise in 1991 and in 2002.

Following the decision of the Left Front government to remove the English language from primary education to decrease school drop-out ratio, the SUCI protested for the reinstatement of English. It called for Bangla Bandh on 3 February 1998 in the demand for bringing back English at the primary education. In the year 2000, the SUCI organised a protest demanding English as a compulsory subject at primary education.

=== Singur-Nandigram movement and alliance with Trinamool Congress ===
SUCI joined the anti-industrial movements in Singur against the SEZ for the Tata Group's car factory and Nandigram against the SEZ for the Salim Group's chemical hub.

SUCI which was gradually diminishing from the political arena of West Bengal, allied with Trinamool Congress led by Mamata Banerjee in 2008. Provash Ghosh, the-then West Bengal State Secretary of SUCI, termed Banerjee as 'very pro-people' and 'pro-struggle'. The alliance also had tacit support of the Communist Party of India (Maoist) and the RSS-controlled Bharatiya Janata Party.

On 21 April 2008, TMC led anti-Left Front Progressive Secular Democratic Front including SUCI called for statewide 12 hour strike.

SUCI contested 2008 West Bengal Panchayat elections, 2009 Indian general election and 2011 West Bengal Legislative Assembly election as part of TMC led alliance. Indian National Congress and other parties were also part of the formation.

In 2009, SUCI was given one Lok Sabha seat to contest under United Progressive Alliance. But it also fielded nine more candidates against Congress. It was speculated that SUCI's move will help Congress by splitting left votes.

In 2011, SUCI initially demanded 17 seats, but with negotiations with TMC, it agreed for 14 seats. But TMC finally decided to leave 2 seats for SUCI. This led to a rift between the two parties and as a result, SUCI announced 28 more candidates against Congress whereas Congress fielded candidates in 66 seats. SUCI won only Jaynagar Assembly constituency and lost Kultali to CPI(M) and forfeited deposits on rest 28 seats.

Nihar Mukherjee Memorial Meeting held in Netaji Indoor Stadium in Kolkata on 3 March 2010

After SUC's disastrous results in 2011 West Bengal Legislative Assembly election, Provash Ghosh said in a press statement that SUC's main aim was to dislodge the CPI(M) government of 34-year span by forming alliance with TMC and his party was ready to sit in opposition after the fall of the Left Front government.

== Recent situation ==
During its peak times, the stronghold of the party was in the South 24 Parganas district of West Bengal, in areas such as Jaynagar Majilpur where it once controlled certain municipalities. But it is now almost organisationally and electorally decimated in those areas.

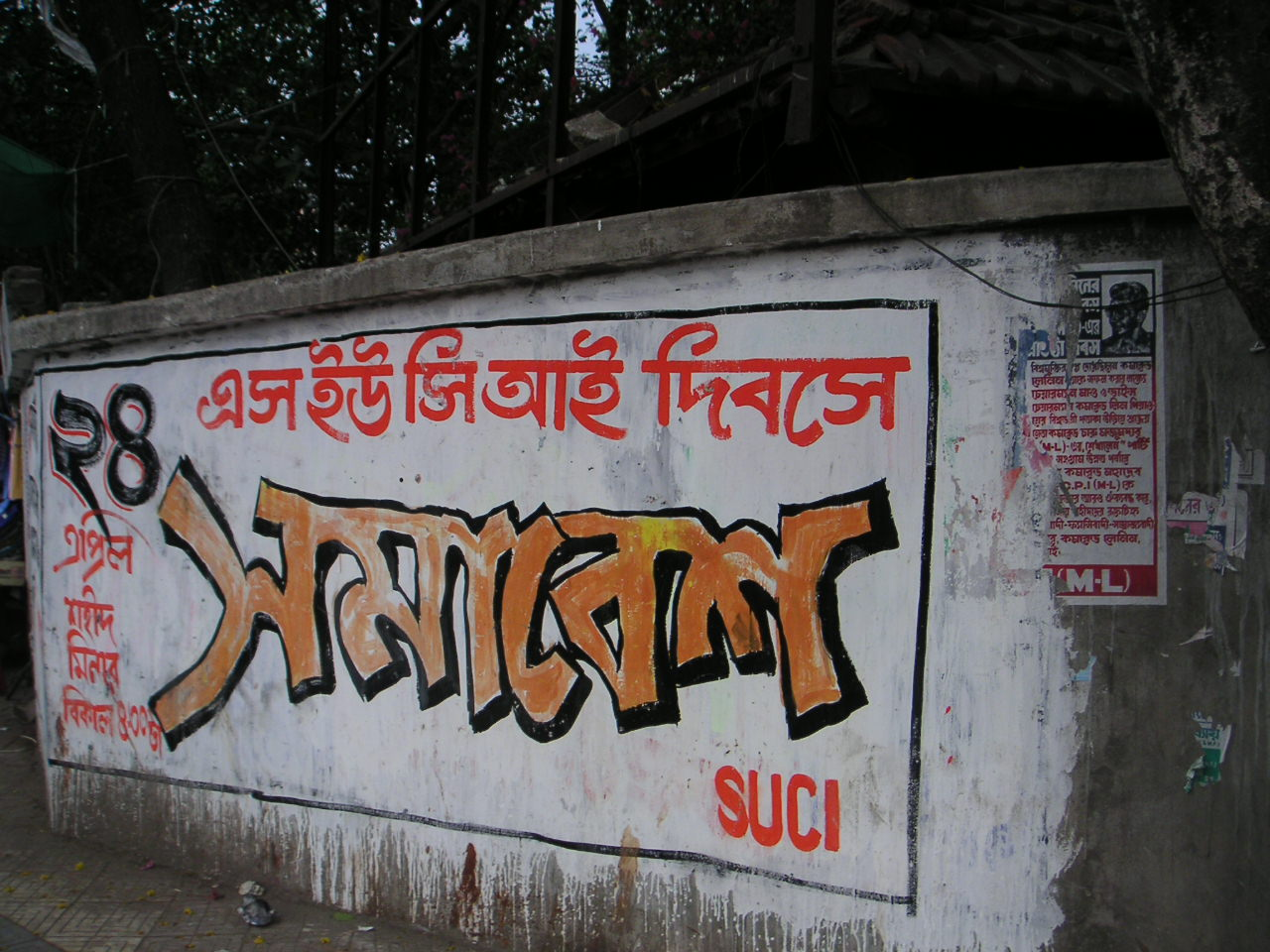
SUCI mural in Kolkata, announcing 'SUCI day' rally on 24 April

Since Tarun Mandal lost in Jaynagar Lok Sabha constituency in 2014 and Tarun Kanti Naskar lost in Jaynagar Assembly constituency in 2016, the party has no representative in any state assembly across the country or in Parliament.

Under the leadership of Prakash Karat and Biman Bose, SUCI and five left parties CPI(M), CPI, CPI(ML)L, AIFB and RSP came to common understanding in 2014 to forge larger left unity in order to strengthen mass movements following Bharatiya Janata Party's ascend to the Central Government in 2014 Indian general election. But SUCI joined took part in some selective programmes among the ones organised by the platform. SUCI current General Secretary Provash Ghosh also mocked smaller constituents of Left Front calling them 'rubber stamp of CPM'. SUCI, before 2016 West Bengal Legislative Assembly election, left the platform and had seat-sharing talks with CPI(ML)L. Finally SUCI contested 182 seats and got zero seat and 0.67% votes losing deposits in 180 seats.

On 5 August 2023, SUCI organised a rally in Brigade Parade Ground in Kolkata after 35 years of its first such rally in 1988. SUCI was actively aided by the right-wing ruling party of West Bengal Trinamool Congress for organising the rally.

SUCI fielded 150 candidates across various states and UTs in 2024 Indian general election and got only 480,987 votes, forfeiting deposits in every seat.

== Party Congresses and leadership ==
=== Party Congresses ===
Party Congresses of SUCI aren't held regularly unlike CPI(M), CPI and other left-wing parties.

The 1st SUCI Party Congress was held in Kolkata in 1988, forty years after its formation. In this conference, the constitution of the party was adopted‌ and the name was changed from Socialist Unity Centre to Socialist Unity Centre of India.

The 2nd Party Congress was held from 11 to 17 November 2009 in Ramlila Maidan, New Delhi. The word 'communist' was added to the party's name at the second party congress.

The third Party Congress was organised in 2018.

=== General Secretaries ===
In SUCI, the General Secretary customarily holds office ad mortem.

List of General Secretaries
S. No.	Term	Portrait	Name	State	References
1	1948–1976		Shibdas Ghosh	West Bengal	
1	Shibdas Ghosh was the founding General Secretary of SUCI.				
2	1976–2010		Nihar Mukherjee	West Bengal	
2	Nihar Mukherjee became general secretary after death of Shibdas Ghosh.				
3	2010-		Provash Ghosh	West Bengal	
3	Provash Ghosh is the current leader of the party. He was elected as the General Secretary of the party by the Central Committee on 4 March 2010 following death of Nihar Mukherjee.				

== Mass organisations ==
The principal mass organisations of SUCI are:

- United Trade Union Centre
- Democratic Students Organisation
- Democratic Youth Organisation
- Mahila Sanskritik Sanghathan
- Krishak Khet Majdoor Sangathan

== Publications ==
The central organ of SUCI is the Proletarian Era, an English forthnighly published from Kolkata.

The publications of various state committees are listed below:

Name of Organ	Language	Place of Publication
Ganadabi	Bengali	Kolkata
Unity	Malayalam	Thiruvananthapuram
Ganamukti	Assamese	Guwahati
Karmika Drushtikona	Kannada	Bangalore
Pattali Chinthanai	Tamil	Chennai
Sarbahara Kranti	Oriya	Bhubaneswar
Sarvahara Dristhikon	Hindi	Delhi
Socialist Viplavam	Telugu	Hyderabad
Morcha	Urdu	Kolkata

== Criticism and controversies ==
SUC is criticised by CPI(M) and other left parties for allying with semi-fascistic and virulently anti-communist party like TMC and having priority to criticise left-wing parties instead of right-wing parties like BJP and TMC in various rallies.

The party has also questionable stances on social issues, calling homosexuality a sign of "mental deformity and morbidity" and it supports "stringent punishment like life-term" of homosexual people. The party which highly talks about progressive culture, is in staunch opposition to the introduction of sex education in schools.

SUCI West Bengal state committee member Bidhan Chatterjee committed suicide in Puri due to growing corruptions and moral decline within the party. A letter to Provash Ghosh by him was obtained and published in Aajkaal newspaper on 10 April 2008 when he was missing. In that letter, Chatterjee mentioned various misdeeds of Provash Ghosh and some other SUCI leaders. Although Ghosh denied the allegations saying that Chatterjee has lost his mind, a Kolkata-based criminal lawyer said that it would be legally difficult to hold Ghosh responsible for Chatterjee's suicide, as the charges brought by Chatterjee may not fit within the confines of criminal law.

== See also ==
- List of political parties in India
