= Provash Ghosh =

Indian politician

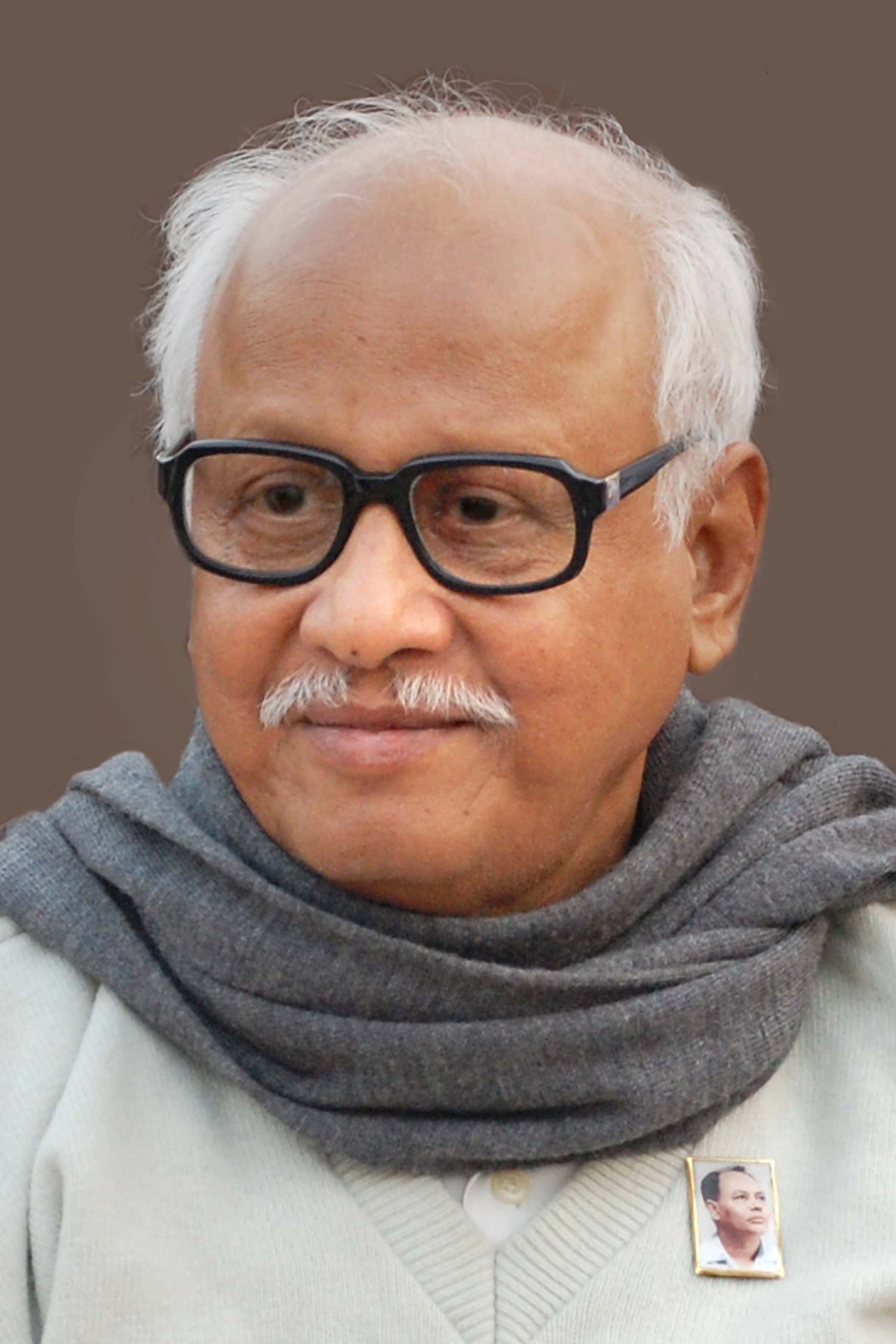

General Secretary of Socialist Unity Centre of India (Communist)
- Incumbent
- Assumed office 2010
- Preceded by: Nihar Mukherjee

Personal details
- Born: 1937 (age 88–89)
- Party: Socialist Unity Centre of India (Communist)

Provash Ghosh is the General Secretary of the Socialist Unity Centre of India (Communist) [SUCI(C)]. He was elected to the position by the central committee of the party on 4 March 2010 following the death of Nihar Mukherjee who was elected to the office by the second party congress of the SUCI(C) in January 2009. As per the constitution of the party, the central committee can elect the General Secretary within the Congress, if the elected general secretary dies. Provash Ghosh was elected to the party politburo during the second party congress.

== Controversies ==
=== Corruptions and moral decline within SUCI and death of Bidhan Chatterjee ===
SUCI West Bengal state committee member Bidhan Chatterjee committed suicide in Puri due to growing corruptions and moral decline within the party. A letter to Provash Ghosh by him was obtained and published in Aajkaal newspaper on 10 April 2008 when he was missing. In that letter, Chatterjee mentioned various misdeeds of Provash Ghosh and some other SUCI leaders including corruptions and assaults on women. Although Ghosh denied the allegations saying that Chatterjee has lost his mind, a Kolkata-based criminal lawyer said that it would be legally difficult to hold Ghosh responsible for Chatterjee's suicide, as the charges brought by Chatterjee may not fit within the confines of criminal law.

=== Stands on LGBTQIA+ ===
In a statement on 15 December 2013, Provash Ghosh called homosexuality a sign of "mental deformity and morbidity" and appealed for "stringent punishment like life-term" of homosexual people.
