= Purna Chandra Lahiri =

Rai Bahadur Purna Chandra Lahiri, JP (1872–1942) was an Indian police officer during British Raj of India. He started his career as an Inspector of Police in Calcutta and retired as Deputy Commissioner of Police of Calcutta. As an Inspector of Police, it was he who arrested several nationalist leaders like Bhupendra Nath Bose in 1907 and later Aurobindo Ghose in 1908 in connection with the Alipore Bomb Case. He served in various posts in Calcutta Police also as Criminal Investigation Department, Assistant Commissioner of Police till he got promoted to post of Deputy Commissioner of Police, the highest post Indian could serve in Police in those times. His role was highly appreciated in handling of 1926-27 Hindu-Muslim riots of Calcutta, which began in April 1926 and took unprecedented fury and ferocity. Before his retirement, he had served as right-hand man of four successive Commissioners of Police of Calcutta. He retired from service in 1927 when Sir Charles Tegart was the Commissioner of Police, Calcutta. In view of his services he was first created as Rai Sahib in 1911 and later elevated to status of Rai Bahadur in 1917. He died in year 1942. He was survived by his widow and his son, Protul Chandra Lahiri, who also was an Indian Police Service officer.
