= Jute Corporation of India =

Textile organization in West Bengal, India

The Jute Corporation of India Limited
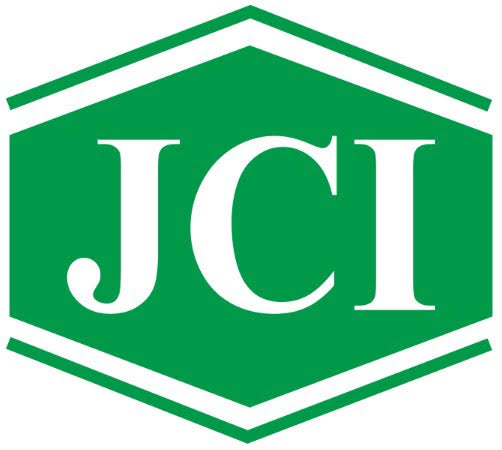
- Industry: Jute trade
- Founded: 1971
- Headquarters: Patsan Bhavan, 3rd & 4th Floor New Town, 700156, West Bengal, India
- Area served: India
- Key people: Sanjay Kumar Panigrahi, Managing Director
- Products: Jute
- Owner: Ministry of Textiles, Government of India
- Website: www.jutecorp.in

The Jute Corporation of India Limited (JCI) is central public sector undertaking under the ownership of Ministry of Textiles, Government of India. It is incorporated by the Government Of India in 1971 as a price support agency with a clear mandate for the procurement of raw jute / mesta without any quantitative limit from the growers at the Minimum Support price (MSP) declared each year by the Government of India based on the recommendations made by Commission for Agricultural Cost & Prices (CACP). This protects the jute growers from exploitation in the hands of the middlemen. The basic objective is not profit making but a social cause to protect the interest of about 4.00 million families engaged in farming of jute, most of whom are small/marginal farmers. Therefore, the presence of JCI in the market provides stability in the raw jute prices.

== Background ==
Traditionally, the jute trade in India has been controlled by middlemen, with a large difference between what the mills pay and what the farmers receive. The jute industry suffers from wide fluctuations in price and supply due to rapid changes in the area cultivated and to the effects of the weather. High prices for one year may lead to over-planting and a glut the next year. Both the growers and the mills that use the crop suffer from these fluctuations. International users have shifted to synthetic fibers in part due to the uncertain supply and in part to high export duties imposed by the Indian government. The government has had to take over the operations of mills that could not compete in this difficult market. The JCI was established in an attempt to stabilize prices, create a buffer stock for the mills, and ensure that farmers received a fair return.

== Operations ==
Since 1966/1967, the government has fixed the MSP for different types of jute and mesta based on recommendations from the Commission for Agricultural Cost and Prices. JCI was established in 1971. At first a small agency, it has steadily grown and now operates in the main jute-growing states of West Bengal, Bihar, Assam, Meghalaya, Tripura, Odisha, and Andhra Pradesh. As of 2004, the JCI operated 171 departmental purchase centers and 69 state-level cooperative centers, and purchased from almost 250 village-level cooperatives. Each of the purchase centers was in hired premises and included an import shed, assortment shed, bale press shed, bale storage godown, and office. The JCI had enough total storage for 215,000 bales each weighing 180 kilograms (400 lb).

The company purchases jute at the defined minimum price when market prices drop to this level, and later sells the jute to jute mills. In times when demand is strong, there may be no need to make purchases since the price remains above the MSP. However, the JCI continues commercial operations in these years. In the 1980s, the JCI experienced difficulty in disposing of its stocks of raw jute purchased under the MSP. The Ministry of Textiles used the power vested in the Jute Commissioner under the Essential Commodities Act, 1955, to fix the price of B.Twill bags and to require private jute mills to lift raw jute from the JCI. This practice has remained in force since then.

As the implementing agency of JTM Mini Mission-III, JCI is engaged in developing market infrastructure like Market Yards, Departmental Purchase Centers (DPCs), etc., and developing market linkage for jute growers.

In recent years, JCI has been engaged in promoting alternative jute retting technologies, viz., jute decorticator, enzyme-based retting. Presently, the Managing Director of JCI is Shri Sanjay Kumar Panigrahi.

== Issues ==
The JCI has made a loss in almost every year of operation since it was founded in 1971/1972.But in recent years, it has started making profits. The Government of India provides an annual subsidy to cover the MSP, even in years where there is no MSP outlay. In these years, the subsidy is set aside for future use.

For the 2011-2012 budget year the amount granted was ₹550 million. When there is a plentiful jute crop, as in 1979-1980 and 1985–1986, the JCI has purchased large quantities at the MSP but the price in many other jute markets has fallen below the MSP. In years with low production, prices have soared even though the JCI released what it could from its stocks.

A review of operations up to 1978 found that the JCI had failed to meet its objective of stabilizing price and supply. It did not have the organization it needed for effective operations, was short of funding, and was handicapped by interference in the way it operated from the Ministry. The recommendation from this review was to give the JCI a monopoly on jute purchases. A 2010 audit said the company still did not provide effective price support. In the years from 2003 to 2009, the company only bought between 0.99% and 10.4% of the available jute, and covered 43% of jute trading centers. At times, the JCI stopped purchases due to a lack of storage facilities, forcing farmers to sell at lower prices to middlemen. The 2010 audit recommended several improvements to procedures combined with scaled-up operations to provide more effective support to the jute growers.

It took pressure from West Bengal Chief Minister Mamata Banerjee to force JCI to purchase jute directly from farmers rather than from middlemen. In October 2011, farmers demonstrated against the low prices offered for their produce in Bechimari, Darrang, Assam, blocking off a road and then attacking vehicles. The police fired, killing four jute farmers. The farmers complained that a cartel of buyers was keeping prices artificially low. In response, the state authorities announced that the sales tax on raw jute would be dropped and a new jute mill would be established at Dalgaon. They could not, however, change the minimum price set by JCI.
