= United Left Front (1967) =

Indian electoral alliance

United Left Front সংযুক্ত বামফ্রন্ট Sanjuhuktobamfront
- Abbreviation: ULF
- Leader: Jyoti Basu
- Chairman: Promode Dasgupta
- Founded: 1967; 59 years ago
- Dissolved: 1977; 49 years ago
- Succeeded by: United Front (1967); LF (1977)
- Political position: Left wing
- Colours: Red

The United Left Front was an electoral alliance in West Bengal, India, formed in December 1966, ahead of the 1967 West Bengal Legislative Assembly election. The front comprised the Communist Party of India (Marxist), the Samyukta Socialist Party, the Socialist Unity Centre of India, the Marxist Forward Bloc, the Revolutionary Communist Party of India, the Workers Party of India and the Revolutionary Socialist Party.

The front won 63 seats out of 280. After the election ULF merged with the People's United Left Front, forming the United Front. The UF formed the state government in West Bengal, dislodging the Indian National Congress for the first time in the state.

== Election result of the ULF ==
| Party | Candidates | Seats won | % of votes |
|---|---|---|---|
| CPI(M) | 135 | 43 | 18.11% |
| SSP | 26 | 7 | 2.13% |
| RSP | 16 | 6 | 2.14% |
| SUCI | 8 | 4 | 0.72% |
| WPI | 2 | 2 | 0.32% |
| MFB | 2 | 1 | 0.21% |
| RCPI | 2 | 0 | 0.31% |
