= Port Trust Board (India) =

In civilian and maritime law in India, a Port Trust Board is the statutory authority responsible for managing shipping and trade through a commercial seaport. India's first Port Trust Board was established for Calcutta Port in 1870, following passage of the Bombay Port Trust Act in 1879. Similar Boards were set up in Madras in 1905. The administration of Port Trust Boards were brought under national government in 1963 with legislation to enable the declaration of "major ports" with ownership of adjacent public land on the foreshore and seabed All ports previously established under different Acts were brought within the purview of this newly enacted law.

== Board membership ==
Besides representatives of the Central Government, the 1963 Act provides for trustees representing (1) labour employed in the port – a minimum of two representatives; (2) ship owners; (3) owners of sailing vessels; (4) shippers; and (5) such other interests, which in the opinion of the Central Government, ought to be locally represented.

In practical terms, autonomy for the board of trustees is nominal. Central Government has overriding powers. Until the early 1990s, trade union leaders representing labour employed in the port were routinely nominated to the board of trustees. However the advent of containerisation significantly reduced the stevedore workforces at major seaports. As a result, labour representation on the various Port Trusts has more recently been filled by civil servants drawn from among the permanent government employees carrying out services and administration functions.

== List of Port Trust Boards ==
Currently there are 13 "major ports" in India, and all except Ennore Port are administered by a Port Trust Board. Ennore Port is a public company limited by guarantee, and fully owned by the national government. The ports with a Port Trust Board are:

- Mumbai
- Kolkata
- Chennai
- Kandla
- Jawaharlal Nehru Port (near Mumbai)
- Mormugao
- New Mangalore
- Cochin
- V.O. Chidambaranar Port
- Port Blair (Andaman and Nicobar islands)
- Visakhapatnam
- Paradip
