= Shibdas Ghosh =

Indian politician

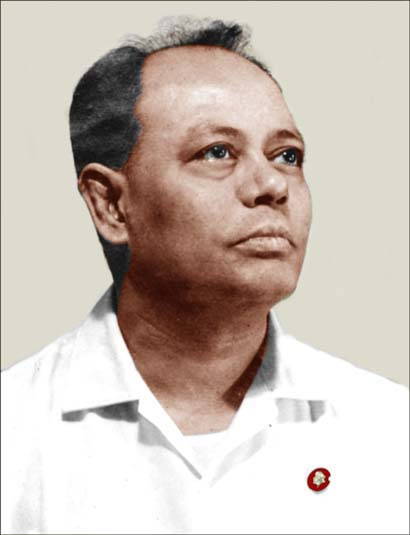

General Secretary of the Socialist Unity Centre
- In office 1948-1976
- Succeeded by: Nihar Mukherjee

Personal details
- Born: 1923 Dhaka, Bengal Province, British India
- Died: 5 August 1976 (aged 52–53) Calcutta, West Bengal, India
- Party: Socialist Unity Centre

Shibdas Ghosh (1923 – 5 August 1976) was the founding general secretary of Socialist Unity Centre.

Ghosh was born in the Dhaka District of British India. He passed his 10th standard from his village school at the age of 13. Later along with some colleagues such as Nihar Mukherjee, he organised SUC in 1948. He died in 1976.
