= Workers Party of India =

Political party in West Bengal, India

- Founded: 1943 (83 years ago)

Workers Party of India is a political party in the Indian state of West Bengal. WPI has its origin in the Democratic Vanguard in India. DV was formed in 1943 when a group led by Jiban Lal Chattopadhyay broke away from the Radical Democratic Party of Manabendra Nath Roy. DV were dissatisfied with the development of RDP into a non-Marxist outfit. Chattopadhyay had been elected secretary of the Bengal Congress in 1930.

On 12 June 1960 DV became the Workers Party of India. The party adopted a hammer and sickle in a five-pointed star as its symbol. The party held its Second All India Conference in Calcutta in 1965, its Third All India Conference in 1970 and the Fourth All India General Conference in 1971. The 8th All India Conference was held in 1976.

WPI was part of the United Left Front electoral alliance that contested the 1967 West Bengal state assembly election. WPI was part of the Communist Party of India (Marxist)-led United Front, which governed West Bengal 1967–1971. Jyotibhushan Bhattacharya, a leader of the Workers Party, was the Education Minister and Information Minister in the two United Front governments in 1967 and 1969 in West Bengal. He was the General Secretary of the party from 1970. Jiban Lal Chattopadhyay died in 1970. In 1976 WPI split into two. One faction, led by Monidranarayan Basu, retained the name WPI. The other faction led by Bhattacharya called itself Communist Workers Party. Subsequently, the Communist Workers Party of India changed its name to Workers Party. Basu died in a car accident, and Salien Pal took over the leadership. WPI considers the Communist Party of the Soviet Union as revisionist.

In the 1980 Indian general election WPI fielded Mohammed Elias Razi in the Raiganj constituency. He obtained 13,554 votes (2.89%).

WPI publishes Ganabiplab (Popular Revolution) in Bengali. As of the early 1980s, Ganabiplab was printed in 1,500 copies and its editor was Hemendra Behari Mukherjee. Its publication was somewhat irregular at the time.

Of late, WPI has joined the Left Front in 2011. Its secretary is Shipra Chakraborty.
