= United Front (West Bengal) =

United Front যুক্তফ্রন্ট Jhuktofront
- Abbreviation: UF
- Leader: Ajoy Mukherjee
- Deputy Leader: Jyoti Basu
- Founded: 1967; 59 years ago
- Dissolved: 1970; 56 years ago
- Merger of: ULF + PULF
- Political position: Left to Centre
- Colours: Red
- West Bengal Legislative Assembly: 214 / 294 Election 1969

The United Front (Bengali: যুক্তফ্রণ্ট) was a political coalition in West Bengal, India, formed shortly after the 1967 West Bengal Legislative Assembly election. It was conceived on 25 February 1967, through the joining of the United Left Front and the People's United Left Front, along with other parties. Soon after its formation, a massive rally was held in Calcutta, at which an 18-point programme of the Front was presented. Ajoy Mukherjee, leader of the Bangla Congress, was the head of the United Front.

The Front formed a state government with Mukherjee as its chief minister and Jyoti Basu became the Deputy Chief Minister, dislodging the Indian National Congress for the first time in the history of the state. The ministry took oath on 15 March 1967.

== 18-point programme ==
The points listed in the programme announced in Calcutta promised that the United Front government would ensure availability of primary needs of the people; handle the food crisis, provide rehabilitation to refugees; fight against corruption, nepotism, black-marketing, unemployment, food prices; pay special attention to women, scheduled castes and tribals; reorganise the police force to respect democratic rights.

== UF Ministries ==
- Bangla Congress: 3 ministers (General Administration, Home, Industry)
- Communist Party of India (Marxist): 3 ministries (Land and Land Revenue (Reforms), Finance, Transport,)
- Communist Party of India: 2 ministries (Information, Irrigation and Waterways)
- All India Forward Bloc: 2 ministries
- Revolutionary Socialist Party: 1 ministry
- Socialist Unity Centre of India: 1 ministry (Labour)
- Samyukta Socialist Party: 1 ministry
- Workers Party of India: 1 ministry
- Akhil Bharatiya Gorkha League: 1 ministry
- Praja Socialist Party: 1 ministry
- Lok Sevak Sangh: 1 ministry
- P.C. Ghosh (independent): Food and Agriculture

A United Front Committee was formed. Every party in the cabinet had its representative in the committee. The function of the committee was to solve disputes that might arise in the coalition, and coordinate the work in the ministries.

== Food issue ==
Tackling the food crisis in the state was a major challenge for the United Front government. When in opposition, the parties behind the United Front had made fervent criticisms of the Congress government for not solving the food crisis. Thus, once in government they were under heavy pressure to perform better than their predecessors. The situation deteriorated in March 1967 as the central government allocated far less food relief supplies to West Bengal than the UF government had asked for (the West Bengal government had asked for 1.5 million tons of food grains per year, the central government pledged to provide around 1 million tons per year). P.C. Ghosh made a presentation on the situation to the Legislative Assembly on 29 March 1967.

Differences on how to manage the food crisis provoked ruptures in the Front. Ghosh's policies focused mainly on voluntary measures and incentives to gather food supplies. Following Ghosh's presentation at the assembly, the CPI(M) sharply criticised him for not having procured enough food supplies, as well as for going soft on wealthier landlords. CPI(M) and other left parties in the Front demanded fixed prices of essential food grains. In Midnapore, CPI(M) cadres organised a protest against Ghosh. In other places, meetings were organized by CPI(M) where demands for Ghosh's resignation were raised.

There were another difference between the Food Minister and the left. The Front decided to politize the food question, and attack the central government and the Congress for withholding food grains from West Bengal. A hunger strike outside the Prime Minister's residence for 23 August 1967. Furthermore, a one-day West Bengal general strike to protest the central government's actions was planned. Ghosh strongly disagreed with these methods of protest. He began threatening to resign, and stopped attending the cabinet meetings.

== Gheraos ==
In the programme of the United Front, it had promised to reorganize the police force not to interfere in democratic movements. A fundamental aspect of this was barring the police from taking actions in labour disputes. After assuming office, the United Front government issued a circular to the police, stating that police would not be able to interfere in gheraos (besieging blockades) unless having the permission of the Minister of Labour. Essentially, this resulted in a sharp rise in gheraos in connection to labour disputes (In May 1967 there were 151 gheraos in West Bengal, compared to 32 in March).

The High Court intervened and nullified the circular. The United Front government responded by issuing a new circular on 12 June 1967. The new circular differentiated between 'legitimate' and 'unlawful' actions in labour conflicts, barring police from intervening in legitimate trade union activities. In the case of unlawful activities the police would be able to intervene, but only after establishing factual grounds. The numbers of gheraos continued to increase, reaching 194 in September. The High Court intervened again, ordering the police force to ignore the circular of the state government in case of gheraos and act in accordance with the law.

As a result of the gheraos, many industrial units were closed down. The Bangla Congress came under pressure from industry owners to stop the gheraos. The Industry and Labour ministries, run by Bangla Congress and SUCI respectively, were at loggerheads with each other.

== Naxalbari ==
Yet a further complication to the United Front government was the internal divisions within CPI(M). Radical elements, calling for immediate revolution, were present in the second-rank leadership of the party in West Bengal. In the northern parts of the state, Charu Majumdar and Kanu Sanyal had built up a power base of their own inside the party ranks. In March 1967 peasants led by the Krishak Samiti, the CPI(M) peasants front, began occupying excess lands in Naxalbari. The revolt grew, and by June reports came that the rebels in Naxalbari had acquired firearms. Inside the United Front differences arose over how to deal with the rebellion. The view of the CPI(M) was that social and economic problems were the cause behind the insurgency, whilst Bangla Congress wished to deal with the rebellion as a law and order problem.

== Line of CPI(M) on the United Front ==
The Central Committee of the CPI(M) met in Calcutta between 10 and 16 April 1967. At the meeting the line towards the United Front governments in West Bengal and Kerala was discussed. The strategy approved by the meeting outlined that "The UF government that we now have are to be treated and understood as instruments of struggle in the hands of our people, more than as Governments that actually possess adequate power, that can materially and substantially give relief to the people. In clear class terms our party's participation in such governments is one specific forms of struggle to win more and more people and more and more allies for the proletariat."

== Ghosh resigns, UF cabinet is dismissed ==
As a result of the various political contradictions inside the United Front, Prafulla Chandra Ghosh resigned from his ministerial post, broke with the UF and formed a new party, the Progressive Democratic Front along with 16 other members of the Legislative Assembly. Ghosh stated his intention to form a government of his own. The Congress declared their support to Ghosh's bid for power. The governor ordered the Chief Minister to gather the Legislative Assembly in two weeks. Mukherjee responded to the governor that he was unable to do so. On 16 November, the governor dismissed the UF cabinet and let Ghosh form a new cabinet.

== UF protests ==
The UF claimed that the way the dismissal of their cabinet had been done was illegal. On 22 November 1967, UF gave a call for a mass rally in at Brigade Parade Grounds, Calcutta, to protest the actions of the governor. The prohibitory orders were issued against the rally, and the demonstration was attacked by police. In response the UF, Rashtriya Sangram Samiti and labour organisations gave a call for a 2-day general strike in West Bengal. During the strike, several violent incidents were reported and one person was killed. Hundreds were arrested. On 18 December 1967, UF launched a civil disobedience campaign across the state. 3500 persons were arrested during the campaign, including 14 assembly members. Violent incidents continued to occur. In February 1968, President's Rule was declared in West Bengal.

== 1969 Assembly election ==
Fresh elections to the Legislative Assembly were held in February 1969, having been postponed due to severe floods. The United Front presented a 32-point programme ahead of the elections.

The PSP had left the UF, but in Midnapore district there was an electoral collaboration between PSP and UF. The Bangla Jatiya Dal had sought to become a member of UF, but its entry had been blocked by Bangla Congress. Except for the parties having held ministries in the UF cabinet, the Revolutionary Communist Party of India (which had failed to get any seat in 1967) contested two seats as a member of UF.

Party	Candidates	Seats won	% of votes
CPI(M)	97	80	19.93%
BC	49	33	8.33%
CPI	36	30	6.83%
AIFB	28	21	5.01%
RSP	17	12	2.86%
SSP	14	9	1.86%
SUCI	7	7	1.53%
LSS	7	4	0.76%
ABGL	4	4	0.54%
WPI	2	2	0.36%
RCPI	2	2	0.39%
MFB	1	1	0.21%
Independents	12	9	2.09%

The result of the election was an overwhelming victory for the UF, with over 50% of the votes and a clear majority in the assembly.
