= People's United Left Front =

Electoral alliance in West Bengal

The People's United Left Front was an electoral alliance in West Bengal, India, formed in December 1966, ahead of the 1967 West Bengal Legislative Assembly election. The front comprised the Communist Party of India, the Bangla Congress, the All India Forward Bloc and the Bolshevik Party of India. The front won 63 seats out of 280. After the election PULF merged with the United Left Front, forming the United Front. The UF formed a state government, dislodging the Indian National Congress for the first time in the state.

== Election result of the PULF ==
Party	Candidates	Seats won	% of votes
BC	81	34	10.44%
CPI	62	16	6.53%
AIFB	42	13	4.40%
