= Mathabhanga subdivision =

Administrative area in West Bengal, India

- Subdivision
- Interactive map of Mathabhanga subdivision
- Coordinates: 26.33°N 89.22°E
- Country: India
- State: West Bengal
- District: Cooch Behar
- Headquarters: Mathabhanga

Languages
  - Official: Bengali, English
- Time zone: UTC+5:30 (IST)
- ISO 3166 code: IN-WB
- Vehicle registration: WB
- Website: wb.gov.in

Mathabhanga subdivision is a subdivision of the Cooch Behar district in the state of West Bengal, India.

== Subdivisions ==
Cooch Behar district is divided into the following administrative subdivisions:

| Subdivision | Headquarters | Area km^{2} | Population (2011) | Rural Population % (2011) | Urban Population % (2011) |
|---|---|---|---|---|---|
| Mekhliganj | Mekhliganj | 459.78 | 282,750 | 90.09 | 9.91 |
| Mathabhanga | Mathabhanga | 896.26 | 654,831 | 96.35 | 3.65 |
| Cooch Behar Sadar | Cooch Behar | 754.84 | 748,394 | 77.92 | 22.08 |
| Tufanganj | Tufanganj | 586.44 | 456,319 | 93.02 | 6.97 |
| Dinhata | Dinhata | 692.02 | 676,792 | 94.02 | 5.98 |
| Cooch Behar district | Cooch Behar | 3,387.00 | 2,819,026 | 89.73 | 10.27 |

Places in the Mathabhanga, Mekhliganj subdivisions and Sitai CD block in Dinhata subdivision of Cooch Behar district
CT: census town, R: rural/ urban centre, M: Municipal town
Owing to space constraints in the small map, the actual locations in a larger map may vary slightly

=== Administrative units ===
Mathabhanga subdivision has 3 police stations, 3 community development blocks, 3 panchayat samitis, 28 gram panchayats, 265 mouzas, 260 inhabited villages and 1 municipality. The municipality is: Mathabhanga. The subdivision has its headquarters at Mathabhanga.

== Gram panchayats ==
The subdivision contains 28 gram panchayats under 3 community development blocks:

- Sitalkuchi block consists of eight gram panchayats, viz. Barokaimari, Chhotosalbari, Gosairhat, Lalbazar, Bhawerthana, Golenowhati, Khalisamari and Sitalkuchi.
- Mathabhanga I block consists of ten gram panchayats, viz. Bairagirhat, Hazrahat–II, Kursamari, Shikarpur, Gopalpur, Jorpatki, Nayarhat, Hazrahat–I, Kedarhat and Pachagarh.
- Mathabhanga II block consists of ten gram panchayats, viz. Angarkata–Pardubi, Ghoksardanga, Nishiganj–II, Unishbisha, Barasoulmari, Latapota, Premerdanga, Fulbari, Nishiganj–I and Ruidanga.

== Police stations ==
Police stations in the Mathabhanga subdivision have the following features and jurisdiction:

| Police Station | Area covered km^{2} | International border | Inter-state border km | Municipal Town | CD block |
|---|---|---|---|---|---|
| Mathabhanga | 322.86 | n/a | - | Mathabhanga | Mathabhanga I |
| Ghoksadanga | 156.92 | - | n/a | - | Mathabhanga II |
| Sitalkuchi | 261.79 | n/a | - | - | Sitalkuchi |

=== Blocks ===
Community development blocks in the Mathabhanga subdivision are:

| CD block | Headquarters | Area km^{2} | Population (2011) | SC % | ST % | Literacy rate % | Census Towns |
|---|---|---|---|---|---|---|---|
| Mathabhanga I | Sikarpur | 319.39 | 218,191 | 68.77 | 0.06 | 71.51 | - |
| Mathabhanga II | Matiar Kuthi | 309.99 | 227,397 | 64.92 | 1.31 | 72.68 | - |
| Sitalkuchi | Sitalkuchi | 262.51 | 185,353 | 54.50 | 0.14 | 70.34 | - |

== Education ==
Given in the table below is a comprehensive picture of the education scenario in Cooch Behar district, with data for the year 2012-13.

| Subdivision | Primary School | | Middle School | | High School | | Higher Secondary School | | General College, Univ | | Technical / Professional Instt | | Non-formal Education | |
| Subdivision | Institution | Student | Institution | Student | Institution | Student | Institution | Student | Institution | Student | Institution | Student | Institution | Student |
|---|---|---|---|---|---|---|---|---|---|---|---|---|---|---|
| Mekhliganj | 216 | 24,210 | 52 | 27,782 | 4 | 4,012 | 21 | 27,680 | 2 | 2858 | 1 | 55 | 456 | 25,387 |
| Mathabhanga | 432 | 52,235 | 80 | 52,338 | 14 | 113,452 | 42 | 61,315 | 4 | 3,910 | 8 | 578 | 1,171 | 70,179 |
| Cooch Behar Sadar | 441 | 61,375 | 47 | 15,322 | 33 | 35,204 | 56 | 59,614 | 6 | 8,934 | 29 | 3,749 | 1,195 | 61,733 |
| Tufanganj | 310 | 31,205 | 72 | 45,231 | 46 | 17,510 | 30 | 38,274 | 2 | 2,871 | 3 | 275 | 950 | 36,293 |
| Dinhata | 431 | 42,213 | 46 | 14,723 | 27 | 31,836 | 29 | 44,946 | 1 | 3,492 | 4 | 381 | 1,228 | 1,950 |
| Cooch Behar district | 1,830 | 211,247 | 297 | 154,943 | 94 | 102,014 | 178 | 231,829 | 15 | 22,065 | 45 | 5,038 | 5,000 | 223,323 |

Note: Primary schools include junior basic schools; middle schools, high schools and higher secondary schools include madrasahs; technical schools include junior technical schools, junior government polytechnics, industrial technical institutes, industrial training centres, nursing training institutes etc.; technical and professional colleges include engineering colleges, medical colleges, para-medical institutes, management colleges, teachers training and nursing training colleges, law colleges, art colleges, music colleges etc. Special and non-formal education centres include sishu siksha kendras, madhyamik siksha kendras, centres of Rabindra mukta vidyalaya, recognised Sanskrit tols, institutions for the blind and other handicapped persons, Anganwadi centres, reformatory schools etc.

=== Educational institutions ===
The following institutions are located in Mathabhanga subdivision:

- Mathabhanga College was established in 1969 at Mathabhanga.
- Sitalkuchi College was established in 1999 at Sitalkuchi
- Madhusudan Hore Mahavidyalaya was established in 2011 at Nishiganj.
- Ghoksadanga Birendra Mahavidyalaya was established in 2011 at Ghoksadanga.

== Healthcare ==
The table below presents an overview of the medical facilities available and patients treated in the hospitals, health centres and sub-centres in 2013 in Cooch Behar district, with data for the year 2012-13.:

| Subdivision | Health & Family Welfare Deptt, WB | | | | Other State Govt Deptts | Local bodies | Central Govt Deptts / PSUs | NGO / Private Nursing Homes | Total | Total Number of Beds | Total Number of Doctors* | Indoor Patients | Outdoor Patients |
| Subdivision | Hospitals | Rural Hospitals | Block Primary Health Centres | Primary Health Centres | Other State Govt Deptts | Local bodies | Central Govt Deptts / PSUs | NGO / Private Nursing Homes | Total | Total Number of Beds | Total Number of Doctors* | Indoor Patients | Outdoor Patients |
|---|---|---|---|---|---|---|---|---|---|---|---|---|---|
| Mekhliganj | 1 | 1 | 1 | 5 | - | - | - | 1 | 9 | 255 | 32 | 23,850 | 185,720 |
| Mathabhanga | 1 | - | 2 | 7 | - | - | - | 3 | 13 | 297 | 45 | 44,730 | 712,513 |
| Cooch Behar Sadar | 4 | - | 2 | 7 | 1 | - | 2 | 9 | 25 | 1,030 | 115 | 96,233 | 560,813 |
| Tufanganj | 1 | - | 2 | 5 | 1 | - | - | 3 | 12 | 266 | 38 | 46,232 | 560,813 |
| Dinhata | 1 | - | 3 | 7 | - | - | - | 3 | 14 | 429 | 50 | 62,943 | 624,514 |
| Cooch Behar district | 8 | 1 | 10 | 31 | 2 | - | 2 | 19 | 73 | 2,277 | 280 | 273,988 | 3,145,902 |

.* Excluding nursing homes.

=== Medical facilities ===
Medical facilities in the Mathabhanga subdivision are as follows:

Hospitals: (Name, location, beds)

- Mathabhanga Subdivisional Hospital, Mathabhanga M, 120 beds

Rural Hospitals: (Name, CD block, location, beds)

- Ghoksadanga Rural Hospital, Mathabhanga II CD block, Ghoksadanga, 30 beds
- Sitalkuch Rural Hospital, Sitalkuchi CD block, Sitalkuchi, 30 beds

Block Primary Health Centres: (Name, CD block, location, beds)

- Asokbari Block Primary Health Centre, Mathabhanga I CD block, PO Mathabhanga, only OPD

Primary Health Centres : (CD block-wise)(CD block, PHC location, beds)

- Mathabhanga I CD block: Pakhihaga (10), Panaguri (PO Shibpur) (10)
- Mathabhanga II CD block: Angarkata Paradubi (PO Paradubi) (6), Khetifulbari (PO Fulbari) (10), Nishiganj (10)
- Sitalkuchi CD block: Chotosalbari (6), Jatamari (4)

== Legislative segments ==
As per order of the Delimitation Commission in respect of the delimitation of constituencies in the West Bengal, the Mathabhanga municipality, Mathabhanga–II block and Hazrahat–I, Hazrahat–II and Pachagarh gram panchayats of Mathabhanga–I block together will constitute the Mathabhanga assembly constituency of West Bengal. The other seven gram panchayats of Mathabhanga–I block, viz. Bairagirhat, Kursamari, Shikarpur, Gopalpur, Jorpatki, Nayarhat and Kedarhat will form the Sitalkuchi assembly constituency along with the whole area under Sitalkuchi block. Both the constituencies will be reserved for Scheduled castes (SC) candidates. Both constituencies will be part of Cooch Behar (Lok Sabha constituency), which will be reserved for SC candidates.
