= Sitalkuchi, Cooch Behar =

Sitalkuchi
- Village
- Location in West Bengal, India Sitalkuchi (India)
- Coordinates: 26.1732°N 89.1796°E
- Country: India
- State: West Bengal
- District: Cooch Behar

Population (2011)
  - Total: 37,052
- Time zone: UTC+5:30 (IST)
- PIN: 736158
- Telephone/STD code: 03583
- Vehicle registration: WB
- Lok Sabha constituency: Cooch Behar
- Vidhan Sabha constituency: Sitalkuchi
- Website: coochbehar.gov.in

Sitalkuchi is a village and a gram panchayat in the Sitalkuchi CD block in the Mathabhanga subdivision of the Cooch Behar district in the state of West Bengal, India.

== Geography ==
Places in the Mathabhanga, Mekhliganj subdivisions and Sitai CD block of Dinhata subdivision in Cooch Behar district
CT: census town, R: rural/ urban centre, M: Municipal town
Owing to space constraints in the small map, the actual locations in a larger map may vary slightly

=== Location ===
Sitalkuchi is located at 26.1732°N 89.1796°E.

=== Area overview ===
The map alongside shows the western part of the district. In Mekhliganj subdivision 9.91% of the population lives in the urban areas and 90.09% lives in the rural areas. In Mathabhanga subdivision 3.67% of the population, the lowest in the district, lives in the urban areas and 96.35% lives in the rural areas. The entire district forms the flat alluvial flood plains of mighty rivers.

Note: The map alongside presents some of the notable locations in the subdivisions. All places marked in the map are linked in the larger full screen map.

== Civic administration ==
=== Police station ===
Sitalkuchi police station has jurisdiction over Sitalkuchi CD block. It covers an area of 261.79 km^{2}.

=== CD block HQ ===
The headquarters of the Sitalkuchi CD block are located at Sitalkuchi village.

== Demographics ==
As per the 2011 Census of India, Sitalkuchi had a total population of 37,052. There were 18,940 (51%) males and 18,112 (49%) females. There were 4,711 persons in the age range of 0 to 6 years. The total number of literate people in Sitalkuchi was 23,473 (72.58% of the population over 6 years).

== Education ==
Sitalkuchi College was established in 1999. Affiliated with the Cooch Behar Panchanan Barma University, it offers honours courses in Bengali, English, political science, history, geography and philosophy and a general course in arts.

== Healthcare ==
Sitalkuchi Rural Hospital, with 30 beds at Sitalkuchi, is the major government medical facility in the Sitalkuchi CD block.
