= Nishiganj =

- Village
- Location in West Bengal, India Nishiganj (India)
- Coordinates: 26.315565°N 89.301412°E
- Country: India
- State: West Bengal
- District: Cooch Behar
- Time zone: UTC+5:30 (IST)
- PIN: 736157
- Telephone/STD code: 03582
- Vehicle registration: WB
- Lok Sabha constituency: Cooch Behar
- Vidhan Sabha constituency: Mathabhanga
- Website: coochbehar.gov.in

Nishiganj is a gram panchayat and not identified as a separate place in 2011 census in the Mathabhanga II CD block in the Mathabhanga subdivision of the Cooch Behar district in the state of West Bengal, India.

== Geography ==
Places in the Mathabhanga, Mekhliganj subdivisions and Sitai CD block in Dinhata subdivision of Cooch Behar district
CT: census town, R: rural/ urban centre, M: Municipal town
Owing to space constraints in the small map, the actual locations in a larger map may vary slightly

=== Location ===
Nishiganj is located at 26.315565°N 89.301412°E.

Nishiganj I and Nishiganj II are gram panchayats.

=== Area overview ===
The map alongside shows the western part of the district. In Mekhliganj subdivision 9.91% of the population lives in the urban areas and 90.09% lives in the rural areas. In Mathabhanga subdivision 3.67% of the population, the lowest in the district, lives in the urban areas and 96.35% lives in the rural areas. The entire district forms the flat alluvial flood plains of mighty rivers.

Note: The map alongside presents some of the notable locations in the subdivisions. All places marked in the map are linked in the larger full screen map.

== Education ==
Madhusudan Hore Mahavidyalaya was established in 2011 at Nishiganj. Affiliated with the Cooch Behar Panchanan Barma University, it offers honours courses in Bengali, English, Sanskrit, history, geography and philosophy, and a general course in arts.

== Healthcare ==
There is a primary health centre at Nishiganj (with 10 beds).
