= Mekhliganj (community development block) =

- Community development block
- Interactive map of Mekhliganj
- Coordinates: 26.35°N 88.92°E
- Country: India
- State: West Bengal
- District: Cooch Behar

Government
  - Type: Representative democracy

Area
  - Total: 302.07 km^{2} (116.63 sq mi)

Population (2011)
  - Total: 155,250
  - Density: 513.95/km^{2} (1,331.1/sq mi)

Languages
  - Official: Bengali, English
- Time zone: UTC+5:30 (IST)
- Lok Sabha constituency: Jalpaiguri
- Vidhan Sabha constituency: Mekliganj
- Website: coochbehar.gov.in

Mekhliganj is a community development block (CD block) that forms an administrative division in the Mekhliganj subdivision of the Cooch Behar district in the Indian state of West Bengal.

== Geography ==
Mekhliganj is located at 26°21′N 88°55′E.

Topographically Cooch Behar district is generally plain land which is low and marshy at some places. “Considering the nature of general surface configuration, relief and drainage pattern, distribution of different types of soil, climatic condition, the formation of geology and forest tracts, the district Koch Bihar falls under Barind Tract. The physiology of this area consists of alluvial soil, generally blackish brown in colour and composed of sand, clay and silt. The soils are loose and sandy throughout the district.” The Himalayan formations in the north end beyond the boundaries of this district. There are no hills/ mountains here. It has a large network of rivers flowing from north-west to south and south-east. The Teesta flows through Mekhliganj CD block before entering Bangladesh. The Jaldhaka and its connected river-streams form a large catchment area in the district. It virtually divides the district into two unequal parts and meets the Brahmaputra in Bangladesh. The Himalayan rivers flowing through Cooch Behar district change courses from time to time. In 1876, W.W. Hunter mentioned the Dharla and the Torsha as the same stream with two names. However, since the advent of the 20th century, these are two different streams meeting the Brahmaputra in Bangladesh.

The hill-streams of Cooch Behar carry debris and silt from the Himalayas and are shallow. During the monsoons the speed of flow of the rivers almost doubles and the rivers overflow the banks causing floods and devastation. The Jaldhaka and Teesta are the major rivers causing floods in the Mekhliganj CD block.

The Mekhliganj CD block is bounded by the Maynaguri CD block in Jalpaiguri district on the north, the Mathabhanga I CD block on the east, the Dimla Upazila and Domar Upazila in Nilphamari District and Hatibandha Upazila of Lalmonirhat District of Bangladesh on the south and the Haldibari CD block on the west.

The Mekhliganj CD block has an area of 302.07 km^{2}. It has 1 panchayat samity, 8 gram panchayats, 112 gram sansads (village councils), 187 mouzas, 137 inhabited villages and 1 census town. Mekhliganj and Kuchlibari police stations serve this block. Headquarters of this CD block is at Changrabandha.

Gram panchayats of Mekhliganj block/ panchayat samiti are: Bagdokra Fulkadabri, Bhotbari, Changrabandha, Jamaldaha, Kuchlibari, Niztaraf, Ranirhat and Uchalpukuri.

Community development blocks in Cooch Behar district

== Demographics ==
=== Population ===
According to the 2011 Census of India, the Mekhliganj CD block had a total population of 155,250, of which 150,767 were rural and 4,483 were urban. There were 80,052 (52%) males and 75,198 (48%) females. There were 21,412 persons in the age range of 0 to 6 years. The Scheduled Castes numbered 110,595 (71.24%) and the Scheduled Tribes numbered 1.918 (1.24%).

According to the 2001 census, Mekhliganj block had a total population of 132,859, out of which 68,866 were males and 63,993 were females. Mekhliganj block registered a population growth of 19.67 per cent during the 1991-2001 decade.

Census towns in the Mekhliganj CD block are (2011 census figures in brackets). Nagar Changrabandha (4,483).

Large villages (with 4,000+ population) in the Mekhliganj CD block are (2011 census figures in brackets): Soulmari (5,418), Purba Dhulia Baidiahati (6,024), Uchal Pukhari (12,858) and Uttar Bhotbari (9,664).

Other villages in the Mekhliganj CD block include (2011 census figures in brackets): Kuchlibari (610), Bagdokara (1,453), Fulkardabri Kaiabari (2,041), Jamaldahat (2,304), Jamaldaha (2,242) and Nijtaraf (1,618).

=== Literacy ===
According to the 2011 census, the total number of literate persons in the Mekhliganj CD block was 92,803 (69.34% of the population over 6 years) out of which males numbered 52,956 (76.79% of the male population over 6 years) and females numbered 39,847 (61.42% of the female population over 6 years). The gender disparity (the difference between female and male literacy rates) was 15.37%.

See also – List of West Bengal districts ranked by literacy rate

Literacy in CD blocks of
Cooch Behar district
Cooch Behar Sadar subdivision
Cooch Behar I – 76.56%
Cooch Behar II – 81.39%
Dinhata subdivision
Dinhata I – 73.23%
Dinhata II – 72.33%
Sitai – 62.79%
Mathabhanga subdivision
Sitalkuchi – 70.34%
Mathabhanga I – 71.51%
Mathabhanga II – 72.68%
Tufanganj subdivision
Tufanganj I – 73.69%
Tufanganj II – 75.75%
Mekhliganj subdivision
Mekhliganj – 69.34%
Haldibari – 69.22%
2011 Census: CD Block Wise

Primary Census Abstract Data

=== Language and religion ===
Religion in Mekhliganj CD block (2011)
| Hinduism | 80.41% |
| Islam | 19.261% |
| Other or not stated | 0.34% |

In the 2011 Census of India, Hindus numbered 124,829 and formed 80.41% of the population of Mekhliganj CD block. Muslims numbered 29,896 and formed 19.26% of the population. Christians numbered 117 and formed 0.08% of the population. Others numbered 408 and formed 0.26% of the population.

Languages of Mekhliganj CD block (2011)
1. Bengali (93.9%)
2. Rajbongshi (2.34%)
3. 'Other' Bengali (1.78%)
4. Hindi (1.12%)
5. Others (0.88%)

At the time of the 2011 census, 93.88% of the population spoke Bengali, 2.34% Rajbongshi and 1.12% Hindi as their first language. 1.78% were recorded as speaking 'Other' under Bengali.

== Rural poverty ==
Based on a study of the per capita consumption in rural and urban areas, using central sample data of NSS 55th Round 1999-2000, Cooch Behar district had a rural poverty ratio of 25.62%.

According to a World Bank report, as of 2012, 20-26% of the population of Cooch Behar, Birbhum, Nadia and Hooghly districts were below poverty line, marginally higher than the level of poverty in West Bengal, which had an average 20% of the population below poverty line.

== Economy ==
=== Livelihood ===
Livelihood
in Mekhliganj CD block
1. Cultivators (48.2%)
2. Agricultural labourers (34.0%)
3. Household industries (1.70%)
4. Other Workers (16.0%)

In the Mekhliganj CD block in 2011, among the class of total workers, cultivators numbered 30,784 and formed 48.22%, agricultural labourers numbered 21,734 and formed 34.04%, household industry workers numbered 1,086 and formed 1.70% and other workers numbered 10,236 and formed 16.03%. Total workers numbered 63,840 and formed 41.12% of the total population, and non-workers numbered 91,410 and formed 58.88% of the population.

Note: In the census records a person is considered a cultivator, if the person is engaged in cultivation/ supervision of land owned by self/government/institution. When a person who works on another person's land for wages in cash or kind or share, is regarded as an agricultural labourer. Household industry is defined as an industry conducted by one or more members of the family within the household or village, and one that does not qualify for registration as a factory under the Factories Act. Other workers are persons engaged in some economic activity other than cultivators, agricultural labourers and household workers. It includes factory, mining, plantation, transport and office workers, those engaged in business and commerce, teachers, entertainment artistes and so on.

=== Infrastructure ===
There are 137 inhabited villages in the Mekhliganj CD block, as per the District Census Handbook, Cooch Behar, 2011. All of these villages have power supply. 135 villages (98.54%) have drinking water supply. 17 villages (12.41%) have post offices. 113 villages (82.48%) have telephones (including landlines, public call offices and mobile phones). 62 villages (45.26%) have pucca (paved) approach roads and 48 villages (35.04%) have transport communication (includes bus service, rail facility and navigable waterways). 9 villages (6.57%) have agricultural credit societies and 10 villages (7.37%) have banks.

=== Agriculture ===
Agriculture is the primary mode of living in the district. The entire Cooch Behar district has fertile soil and around half of the cultivated land in the district is cropped twice or more. Paddy (rice) and jute are the largest producing crops, followed by potatoes, vegetables and pulses. There are 23 tea gardens on glided slopes. There are some coconut, areca nut and betel leaf plantations. 77.6% of the land holdings are marginal.

In 2012-13, there were 72 fertiliser depots, 1 seed store and 27 fair price shops in the Mekhliganj CD block.

In 2012–13, the Mekhliganj CD block produced 39,133 tonnes of Aman paddy, the main winter crop, from 15,791 hectares, 5,880 tonnes of Boro paddy (spring crop) from 1,944 hectares, 161 tonnes of Aus paddy (summer crop) from 89 hectares, 2,760 tonnes of wheat from 1,249 hectares, 231 tonnes of maize from 95 hectares, 32,173 tonnes of jute from 2,496 hectares and 39,589 tonnes of potatoes from 1,470 hectares. It also produced pulses and oilseeds.

In 2012-13, the total area irrigated in the Mekhliganj CD block was 4,902 hectares, out of which 100 hectares were irrigated by private canal water, 70 hectares by tank water, 490 hectares by river lift irrigation, 77 hectares by deep tube wells, 2,250 hectares by shallow tube wells, 1,140 hectares by open dug wells, 775 hectares by other means.

=== Pisciculture ===
Being a river-bound district, pisciculture is an important economic activity in Cooch Behar district. Almost all the rivers originating in the Himalayas have a lot of fish. The net area under effective pisciculture in 2010-11 in Mekhliganj CD block was 60.00 hectares. 7,085 persons were engaged in the profession and approximate annual production was 2,703 quintals.

=== Banking ===
In 2012-13, Mekhliganj CD block had offices of 3 commercial banks and 5 gramin banks.

== Transport ==
Mekhliganj CD block has 4 ferry services and 4 originating/ terminating bus routes.

The New Mal-Changrabandha-New Cooch Behar line passes through this block and there are stations at Changrabandha and New Changrabndha.

== Education ==
In 2012-13, Mekhliganj CD block had 113 primary schools with 9,314 students, 28 middle schools with 17,370 students, 2 high schools with 2,952 students and 10 higher secondary schools with 12,663 students. Mekhliganj CD block had 1 general degree college with 982 students, 193 institutions for special and non-formal education with 10,502 students.

See also – Education in India

According to the 2011 census, in the Mekhliganj CD block, among the 137 inhabited villages, 46 villages did not have schools, 32 villages had two or more primary schools, 20 villages had at least 1 primary and 1 middle school and 10 villages had at least 1 middle and 1 secondary school.

== Healthcare ==
In 2013, Mekhliganj CD block had 1 block primary health centre and 3 primary health centres with total 30 beds and 5 doctors (excluding private bodies). It had 24 family welfare subcentres. 2,720 patients were treated indoor and 34,172 patients were treated outdoor in the hospitals, health centres and subcentres of the CD block. There is a hospital, with 120 beds, in Mekhliganj municipal area (outside the CD block).

Changrabandha Block Primary Centre, with 10 beds at Changrabandha, is the major government medical facility in the Mekhliganh CD block. Mekhliganj Subdivional Hospital, with 120 beds, functions at Mekhliganj. There is a primary health centre at Jamaldaha (with 10 beds).
