= Ghoksadanga =

- Neighbourhood
- Location in West Bengal, India Ghoksadanga (India)
- Coordinates: 26.431265°N 89.273212°E
- Country: India
- State: West Bengal
- District: Cooch Behar
- Time zone: UTC+5:30 (IST)
- PIN: 736171
- Telephone/STD code: 03583
- Vehicle registration: WB
- Lok Sabha constituency: Cooch Behar
- Vidhan Sabha constituency: Mathabhanga
- Website: coochbehar.gov.in

Ghoksadanga is a neighbourhood and a gram panchayat in the Mathabhanga II CD block in the Mathabhanga subdivision of the Cooch Behar district in the state of West Bengal, India.

== Geography ==
Places in the Mathabhanga, Mekhliganj subdivisions and Sitai CD block in Dinhata subdivision of Cooch Behar district
CT: census town, R: rural/ urban centre, M: Municipal town
Owing to space constraints in the small map, the actual locations in a larger map may vary slightly

=== Location ===
Ghoksadanga is located at 26.431265°N 89.273212°E.

According to the map of the Mathabhanga II CD block on page 241 in the District Census Handbook, Koch Bihar, 2011 census, Ghoksadanga is shown as a part of Bara Simulguri village (MDDS PLCN 2011 / 308306).

=== Area overview ===
The map alongside shows the western part of the district. In Mekhliganj subdivision 9.91% of the population lives in the urban areas and 90.09% lives in the rural areas. In Mathabhanga subdivision 3.67% of the population, the lowest in the district, lives in the urban areas and 96.35% lives in the rural areas. The entire district forms the flat alluvial flood plains of mighty rivers.

Note: The map alongside presents some of the notable locations in the subdivisions. All places marked in the map are linked in the larger full screen map.

== Civic administration ==
=== Police station ===
Ghoksadanga police station has jurisdiction over Mathabhanga II CD block.

== Transport ==
Ghoksadanga railway station is on the Barauni-Guwahati Line of Northeast Frontier Railway.

== Education ==
Ghoksadanga Birendra Mahavidyalaya was established in 2011. Affiliated with the Cooch Behar Panchanan Barma University, it offers honours courses in Bengali, English, Sanskrit, political science, history and education, and a general course in arts.

== Healthcare ==
Ghoksadanga Rural Hospital, with 30 beds at Ghoksadanga, is the major government medical facility in the Mathabhanga II CD block.
