= Sitalkuchi =

Sitalkuchi Sitailkuchi
- Community development block
- Interactive map of Sitalkuchi
- Coordinates: 26.16°N 89.19°E
- Country: India
- State: West Bengal
- District: Cooch Behar

Government
  - Type: Representative democracy

Area
  - Total: 262.51 km^{2} (101.36 sq mi)

Population (2001)
  - Total: 185,353
  - Density: 706.08/km^{2} (1,828.7/sq mi)

Languages
  - Official: Bengali, English
- Time zone: UTC+5:30 (IST)
- Lok Sabha constituency: Cooch Behar
- Vidhan Sabha constituency: Sitalkuchi
- Website: coochbehar.gov.in

Sitalkuchi is a community development block (CD block) that forms an administrative division in the Mathabhanga subdivision of the Cooch Behar district in the Indian state of West Bengal.

== Geography ==
Sitalkuchi is located at 26°10′N 89°11′E.

Topographically, Cooch Behar district is generally plain land which is low and marshy in places. “Considering the nature of general surface configuration, relief and drainage pattern, distribution of different types of soil, climatic condition, the formation of geology and forest tracts, the district Koch Bihar falls under Barind Tract. The physiology of this area consists of alluvial soil, generally blackish brown in colour and composed of sand, clay and silt. The soils are loose and sandy throughout the district.” The Himalayan formations in the north end beyond the boundaries of this district. There are no hills/ mountains here. It has a large network of rivers flowing from north-west to south and south-east. The Teesta flows through Mekhliganj CD block before entering Bangladesh. The Jaldhaka and its connected river-streams form a large catchment area in the district. It virtually divides the district into two unequal parts and meets the Brahmaputra in Bangladesh. The Himalayan rivers flowing through Cooch Behar district change courses from time to time. In 1876, W.W. Hunter mentioned the Dharla and the Torsha as the same stream with two names. However, since the advent of the 20th century, these are two different streams meeting the Brahmaputra in Bangladesh.

The hill-streams of Cooch Behar carry debris and silt from the Himalayas and are shallow. During the monsoons the speed of flow of the rivers almost doubles and the rivers overflow the banks causing floods and devastation. The Mansai and Dharla are the major rivers causing floods in the Sitalkuchi CD block.

The Sitalkuchi CD block is bounded by the Mathabhanga I CD block on the north, the Cooch Behar I CD block on the east, the Sitai CD block on the south, and the Hatibandha Upazila in Lalmonirhat District of Bangladesh on the west.

The Sitalkuchi CD block has an area of 262.51 km^{2}. It has 1 panchayat samity, 8 gram panchayats, 143 gram sansads (village councils), 70 mouzas and 67 inhabited villages. Sitalkuchi police station serves this block. Headquarters of this CD block is at Sitalkuchi.

Gram panchayats of Sitai block/ panchayat samiti are: Bara Koimari, Bhawerthana, Chhoto Salbabari, Golenaohati, Gosairhat, Khalisamari, Lalbazar and Sitalkuchi.

Community development blocks in Cooch Behar district

== Demographics ==
=== Population ===
According to the 2011 Census of India, the Sitalkuchi CD block had a total population of 185,353, all of which were rural. There were 94,277 (51%) males and 91,076 (49%) females. There were 25,304 persons in the age range of 0 to 6 years. The Scheduled Castes numbered 101,009 (54.50%) and the Scheduled Tribes numbered 259 (0.14%).

According to the 2001 census, Sitalkuchi block had a total population of 163,802, out of which 84,477 were males and 79,325 were females. Sitalkuchi block registered a population growth of 7.81 per cent during the 1991-2001 decade.

Large villages (with 4,000+ population) in the Sitalkuchi CD block are (2011 census figures in brackets): Mahishmuri (5,525), Bhogdabri (4,075), Sitalkuchi (37,052), Golenaohati (10,208), Petlaepra (5,261), Bara Gadaikhora (4,753), Nagar Lalbazar (7,732) and Bara Masia (5,975).

Other villages in the Sitalkuchi CD block include (2011 census figures in brackets): Bhair Thana (3,656), Bara Kaimari (3,250) and Chotta Salbari (3,635).

=== Literacy ===
According to the 2011 census, the total number of literate persons in the Sitalkuchi CD block was 12,572 (70.34% of the population over 6 years) out of which males numbered 62,693 (77.03% of the male population over 6 years) and females numbered 49,879 (63.41% of the female population over 6 years). The gender disparity (the difference between female and male literacy rates) was 13.61%.

See also – List of West Bengal districts ranked by literacy rate

Literacy in CD blocks of
Cooch Behar district
Cooch Behar Sadar subdivision
Cooch Behar I – 76.56%
Cooch Behar II – 81.39%
Dinhata subdivision
Dinhata I – 73.23%
Dinhata II – 72.33%
Sitai – 62.79%
Mathabhanga subdivision
Sitalkuchi – 70.34%
Mathabhanga I – 71.51%
Mathabhanga II – 72.68%
Tufanganj subdivision
Tufanganj I – 73.69%
Tufanganj II – 75.75%
Mekhliganj subdivision
Mekhliganj – 69.34%
Haldibari – 69.22%
2011 Census: CD Block Wise

Primary Census Abstract Data

=== Language and religion ===
Religion in Sitalkuchi CD block (2011)
Hinduism	64.53%
Islam	35.31%
Other or not stated	0.16%

In the 2011 Census of India, Hindus numbered 119,603 and formed 64.53% of the population of Sitalkuchi CD block. Muslims numbered 65,446 and formed 35.31% of the population. Christians numbered 136 and formed 0.07% of the population. Others numbered 168 and formed 0.09% of the population.

Languages of Sitalkuchi CD block (2011)
1. Bengali (98.4%)
2. 'Other' Bengali (0.92%)
3. Others (0.65%)

At the time of the 2011 census, 98.43% of the population spoke Bengali as their first language. 0.92% were recorded as speaking 'Other' under Bengali.

== Rural poverty ==
Based on a study of the per capita consumption in rural and urban areas, using central sample data of NSS 55th Round 1999–2000, Cooch Behar district had a rural poverty ratio of 25.62%.

According to a World Bank report, as of 2012, 20-26% of the population of Cooch Behar, Birbhum, Nadia and Hooghly districts were below poverty line, marginally higher than the level of poverty in West Bengal, which had an average 20% of the population below poverty line.

== Economy ==
=== Livelihood ===
Livelihood
in Sitaikuchi CD block
1. Cultivators (56.6%)
2. Agricultural labourers (29.9%)
3. Household industries (1.96%)
4. Other Workers (11.5%)

In the Sitalkuchi CD block in 2011, among the class of total workers, cultivators numbered 41,464 and formed 56.59%, agricultural labourers numbered 21,937 and formed 29.94%, household industry workers numbered 1,436 and formed 1.96% and other workers numbered 8,440 and formed 11.52%. Total workers numbered 73,277 and formed 39.53% of the total population, and non-workers numbered 112,076 and formed 60.47% of the population.

Note: In the census records a person is considered a cultivator, if the person is engaged in cultivation/ supervision of land owned by self/government/institution. When a person who works on another person's land for wages in cash or kind or share, is regarded as an agricultural labourer. Household industry is defined as an industry conducted by one or more members of the family within the household or village, and one that does not qualify for registration as a factory under the Factories Act. Other workers are persons engaged in some economic activity other than cultivators, agricultural labourers and household workers. It includes factory, mining, plantation, transport and office workers, those engaged in business and commerce, teachers, entertainment artistes and so on.

=== Infrastructure ===
There are 67 inhabited villages in the Sitalkuchi CD block, as per the District Census Handbook, Cooch Behar, 2011. 100% villages have power supply. 66 villages (98.51%) have drinking water supply. 15 villages (22.39%) have post offices. 58 villages (86.57%) have telephones (including landlines, public call offices and mobile phones). 35 villages (52.24%) have pucca (paved) approach roads and 19 villages (28.36%) have transport communication (includes bus service, rail facility and navigable waterways). 4 villages (5.97%) have agricultural credit societies and 5 villages (7.46%) have banks.

=== Agriculture ===
Agriculture is the primary mode of living in the district. The entire Cooch Behar district has fertile soil and around half of the cultivated land in the district is cropped twice or more. Paddy (rice) and jute are the largest producing crops, followed by potatoes, vegetables and pulses. There are 23 tea gardens on glided slopes. There are some coconut, areca nut and betel leaf plantations. 77.6% of the land holdings are marginal.

In 2012–13, there were 100 fertiliser depots, 2 seed stores and 30 fair price shops in the Sitalkuchi CD block.

In 2012–13, the Sitalkuchi CD block produced 47,185 tonnes of Aman paddy, the main winter crop, from 21,223 hectares, 16,575 tonnes of Boro paddy (spring crop) from 5,285 hectares, 525 tonnes of Aus paddy (summer crop) from 341 hectares, 5 tonnes of wheat from 3 hectares, 112,736 tonnes of jute from 8,247 hectares and 35,272 tonnes of potatoes from 1,089 hectares. It also produced pulses and oilseeds.

In 2012–13, the total area irrigated in the Sitalkuchi CD block was 4,637 hectares, out of which 237 hectares were irrigated by private canal water, 395 hectares by tank water, 462 hectares by river lift irrigation, 165 hectares by deep tube wells, 2,574 hectares by shallow tube wells, 86 hectares by open dug wells, 721 hectares by other means.

=== Pisciculture ===
Being a river-bound district, pisciculture is an important economic activity in the Cooch Behar district. Almost all the rivers originating in the Himalayas have a lot of fish. The net area under effective pisciculture in 2010–11 in the Sitalkuchi CD block was 120.55 hectares. 18,565 persons were engaged in the profession and approximate annual production was 7,973 quintals.

=== Banking ===
In 2012–13, Sitalkuchi CD block had offices of 3 commercial banks and 2 gramin banks.

== Transport ==
Sitalkuchi CD block has 3 originating/ terminating bus routes. The nearest railway station is 36 km from block headquarters.

== Education ==
In 2012–13, Sitalkuchi CD block had 125 primary schools with 18,486 students, 25 middle schools with 12,522 students, 6 high schools with 5,885 students and 9 higher secondary schools with 15,100 students. Sitalkuchi CD block had 1 general degree college with 822 students, 1 technical/ professional institution with 96 students, 332 institutions for special and non-formal education with 18,197 students.

See also – Education in India

According to the 2011 census, in the Sitalkuchi CD block, among the 67 inhabited villages, 5 villages did not have schools, 36 villages had two or more primary schools, 19 villages had at least 1 primary and 1 middle school and 12 villages had at least 1 middle and 1 secondary school.

Sitalkuchi College was established in 1999 at Sitalkuchi

=== Baramaricha Delwar Hossain High School ===
The Baramaricha Delwar Hossain High School is a government-sponsored, co-educational, higher secondary school under Sitalkuchi East Circle (26.1352°N 89.2438°E). It was founded in 1872 during the Cooch Behar State regime. The school is the oldest school of Cooch Behar District.

The school was originally named Maricha M.E. School and was one of the state M.E. Schools. It was converted to a basic school on January 4, 1960. It was then converted to junior high school on January 1, 1970. It was later converted to a high school on January 1, 1984. Sometime during its history, the name changed from Maricha High School to Baramaricha Delwar Hossain High School in honor of its first headmaster, Delwar Hossain. In the 2004–2005 school year, the school was upgraded to a higher secondary school.

== Healthcare ==
In 2013, Sitalkuchi CD block had 1 block primary health centre and 2 primary health centres with total 40 beds and 5 doctors (excluding private bodies). It had 30 family welfare subcentres. 5,356 patients were treated indoor and 34,262patients were treated outdoor in the hospitals, health centres and subcentres of the CD block.

Sitalkuchi Rural Hospital, with 30 beds at Sitalkuchi village, is the major government medical facility in the Sitalkuchi CD block. There are primary health centres at Chotosalbari (with 6 beds) and Jatamari (with 4 beds).
