= Haldibari (community development block) =

- Community development block
- Interactive map of Haldibari
- Coordinates: 26.33°N 88.77°E
- Country: India
- State: West Bengal
- District: Cooch Behar

Government
  - Type: Representative democracy

Area
  - Total: 152.38 km^{2} (58.83 sq mi)

Population (2011)
  - Total: 103,969
  - Density: 682.30/km^{2} (1,767.2/sq mi)

Languages
  - Official: Bengali, English
- Time zone: UTC+5:30 (IST)
- Lok Sabha constituency: Jalpaiguri
- Vidhan Sabha constituency: Mekliganj
- Website: coochbehar.gov.in

Haldibari is a community development block (CD block) that forms an administrative division in the Mekhliganj subdivision of the Cooch Behar district in the Indian state of West Bengal.

== Geography ==
Haldibari is located at 26°20′N 88°46′E.

Topographically Cooch Behar district is generally plain land which is low and marshy at some places. “Considering the nature of general surface configuration, relief and drainage pattern, distribution of different types of soil, climatic condition, the formation of geology and forest tracts, the district Koch Bihar falls under Barind Tract. The physiology of this area consists of alluvial soil, generally blackish brown in colour and composed of sand, clay and silt. The soils are loose and sandy throughout the district.” The Himalayan formations in the north end beyond the boundaries of this district. There are no hills/ mountains here. It has a large network of rivers flowing from north-west to south and south-east. The Teesta flows through Mekhliganj CD block before entering Bangladesh. The Jaldhaka and its connected river-streams form a large catchment area in the district. It virtually divides the district into two unequal parts and meets the Brahmaputra in Bangladesh. The Himalayan rivers flowing through Cooch Behar district change courses from time to time. In 1876, W.W. Hunter mentioned the Dharla and the Torsha as the same stream with two names. However, since the advent of the 20th century, these are two different streams meeting the Brahmaputra in Bangladesh.

The hill-streams of Cooch Behar carry debris and silt from the Himalayas and are shallow. During the monsoons the speed of flow of the rivers almost doubles and the rivers overflow the banks causing floods and devastation. The Teesta is the major river causing floods in the Haldibari CD block.

The Haldibari CD block is bounded by the Jalpaiguri CD block in Jalpaiguri district on the north, the Mekhliganj CD block on the east, the Panchagarh Sadar Upazila and Debiganj Upazila in Panchagarh district of Bangladesh on the south and the Jalpaiguri CD block on the west.

The Haldibari CD block has an area of 152.38 km^{2}. It has 1 panchayat samity, 6 gram panchayats, 73 gram sansads (village councils), 62 mouzas and 57 inhabited villages. Haldibari police station serves this block. Headquarters of this CD block is at Haldibari.

Gram panchayats of Haldibari block/ panchayat samiti are: Baxiganj, Daxin Bara Haldibari, Dewanganj, Hemkumari, Per Mekhliganj and Uttar Bara Haldibari.

Community development blocks in Cooch Behar district

== Demographics ==
=== Population ===
According to the 2011 Census of India, the Haldibari CD block had a total population of 103,969, all of which were rural. There were 52,851 (51%) males and 51,118 (49%) females. There were 13,194 persons in the age range of 0 to 6 years. The Scheduled Castes numbered 63,609 (61.18%) and the Scheduled Tribes numbered 313 (0.30%).

According to the 2001 census, Haldibari block had a total population of 93,836, out of which 48,466 were males and 45,370 were females. Haldibari block registered a population growth of 20.56 per cent during the 1991-2001 decade.

Large villages (with 4,000+ population) in the Haldibari CD block are (2011 census figures in brackets): Bara Haldibari (P) (32,340), Hemkumari (16,491) and Madhya Hudumdanga (16,491).

Other villages in the Haldibari CD block include (2011 census figures in brackets): Mekhliganj (1,242) and Uttar Bakshiganj (3,229).

=== Literacy ===
According to the 2011 census, the total number of literate persons in the Haldibari CD block was 62,837 (69.22% of the population over 6 years) out of which males numbered 34,912 (75.69% of the male population over 6 years) and females numbered 27,925 (62.54% of the female population over 6 years). The gender disparity (the difference between female and male literacy rates) was 13.16%.

See also – List of West Bengal districts ranked by literacy rate

Literacy in CD blocks of
Cooch Behar district
Cooch Behar Sadar subdivision
Cooch Behar I – 76.56%
Cooch Behar II – 81.39%
Dinhata subdivision
Dinhata I – 73.23%
Dinhata II – 72.33%
Sitai – 62.79%
Mathabhanga subdivision
Sitalkuchi – 70.34%
Mathabhanga I – 71.51%
Mathabhanga II – 72.68%
Tufanganj subdivision
Tufanganj I – 73.69%
Tufanganj II – 75.75%
Mekhliganj subdivision
Mekhliganj – 69.34%
Haldibari – 69.22%
2011 Census: CD Block Wise

Primary Census Abstract Data

=== Language and religion ===
Religion in Haldibari CD block (2011)
Hinduism	66.53%
Islam	33.14%
Other or not stated	0.33%

In the 2011 Census of India, Hindus numbered 69,168 and formed 66.53% of the population of Haldibari CD block. Muslims numbered 34,453 and formed 33.14% of the population. Christians numbered 284 and formed 0.27% of the population. Others numbered 64 and formed 0.06% of the population.

Languages of Haldibari CD block (2011)
1. Bengali (97.0%)
2. 'Other' Bengali (1.65%)
3. Others (1.37%)

At the time of the 2011 census, 96.98% of the population spoke Bengali as their first language. 1.65% were recorded as speaking 'Other' under Bengali.

== Rural poverty ==
Based on a study of the per capita consumption in rural and urban areas, using central sample data of NSS 55th Round 1999–2000, Cooch Behar district had a rural poverty ratio of 25.62%.

According to a World Bank report, as of 2012, 20-26% of the population of Cooch Behar, Birbhum, Nadia and Hooghly districts were below poverty line, marginally higher than the level of poverty in West Bengal, which had an average 20% of the population below poverty line.

== Economy ==
=== Livelihood ===
Livelihood
in Haldibari CD block
1. Cultivators (38.0%)
2. Agricultural labourers (44.0%)
3. Household industries (1.31%)
4. Other Workers (16.7%)

In the Haldibari CD block in 2011, among the class of total workers, cultivators numbered 14,793 and formed 37.98%, agricultural labourers numbered 17,346 and formed 44.00%, household industry workers numbered 515 and formed 1.31% and other workers numbered 6,585 and formed 16.71%. Total workers numbered 39,419 and formed 37.91% of the total population, and non-workers numbered 64,550 and formed 62.09% of the population.

Note: In the census records a person is considered a cultivator, if the person is engaged in cultivation/ supervision of land owned by self/government/institution. When a person who works on another person's land for wages in cash or kind or share, is regarded as an agricultural labourer. Household industry is defined as an industry conducted by one or more members of the family within the household or village, and one that does not qualify for registration as a factory under the Factories Act. Other workers are persons engaged in some economic activity other than cultivators, agricultural labourers and household workers. It includes factory, mining, plantation, transport and office workers, those engaged in business and commerce, teachers, entertainment artistes and so on.

=== Infrastructure ===
There are 57 inhabited villages in the Haldibari CD block, as per the District Census Handbook, Cooch Behar, 2011. 100% villages have power supply. 56 villages (98.25%) have drinking water supply. 7 villages (12.28%) have post offices. 55 villages (96.49%) have telephones (including landlines, public call offices and mobile phones). 30 villages (52.63%) have pucca (paved) approach roads and 18 villages (31.58%) have transport communication (includes bus service, rail facility and navigable waterways). 12 villages (21.05%) have agricultural credit societies and 2 villages (3.51%) have banks.

=== Agriculture ===
Agriculture is the primary mode of living in the district. The entire Cooch Behar district has fertile soil and around half of the cultivated land in the district is cropped twice or more. Paddy (rice) and jute are the largest producing crops, followed by potatoes, vegetables and pulses. There are 23 tea gardens on glided slopes. There are some coconut, areca nut and betel leaf plantations. 77.6% of the land holdings are marginal.

In 2012–13, there were 37 fertiliser depots, 1 seed store and 10 fair price shops in the Haldibari CD block.

In 2012–13, the Haldibari CD block produced 24,606 tonnes of Aman paddy, the main winter crop, from 10,618 hectares, 5,429 tonnes of Boro paddy (spring crop) from 1,791 hectares, 264 tonnes of wheat from 135 hectares, 37 tonnes of maize from 15 hectares, 43,650 tonnes of jute from 3,255 hectares, 11,248 tonnes of potatoes from 713 hectares and 314 tonnes of sugar cane from 3 hectares. It also produced pulses and oilseeds.

In 2012–13, the total area irrigated in the Haldibari CD block was 3,546 hectares, out of which 295 hectares were irrigated by private canal water, 50 hectares by tank water, 368 hectares by river lift irrigation, 51 hectares by deep tube wells, 2,262 hectares by shallow tube wells, 330 hectares by open dug wells, 190 hectares by other means.

=== Pisciculture ===
Being a river-bound district, pisciculture is an important economic activity in Cooch Behar district. Almost all the rivers originating in the Himalayas have a lot of fish. The net area under effective pisciculture in 2010–11 in Haldibari CD block was 145.55 hectares. 4,840 persons were engaged in the profession and approximate annual production was 9,744 quintals.

=== Banking ===
In 2012–13, Haldibari CD block had offices of 4 commercial banks and 4 gramin banks.

== Transport ==
Haldibari CD block has 2 ferry services and 5 originating/ terminating bus routes.

The New Jalpaiguri-Haldibari line passes through this block and there is a station at Kashiabari.

== Education ==
In 2012–13, Haldibari CD block had 85 primary schools with 9,553 students, 24 middle schools with 10,412 students, 2 high schools with 1,960 students and 7 higher secondary schools with 6,195 students. Haldibari CD block had 219 institutions for special and non-formal education with 12,321 students. Haldibari municipal area had 1 general degree college with 1,875 students and 1 technical/ professional institution with 55 students (outside the CD block).

See also – Education in India

According to the 2011 census, in the Haldibari CD block, among the 57 inhabited villages, 17 villages did not have schools, 18 villages had two or more primary schools, 10 villages had at least 1 primary and 1 middle school and 6 villages had at least 1 middle and 1 secondary school.

== Healthcare ==
In 2013, Haldibari CD block and Haldibari municipal area had 1 rural hospital and 3 primary health centres with total 105 beds and 11 doctors (excluding private bodies). It had 18 family welfare subcentres. 10,066 patients were treated indoor and 62,415 patients were treated outdoor in the hospitals, health centres and subcentres of the CD block.

Haldibari Rural Hospital, with 30 beds at Haldibari, is the major government medical facility in the Haldibari CD block. There are primary health centres at Anguldekha (PO Bakshiganj) (with 10 beds), Hudumdanga (PO Dewanganj) (with 6 beds) and Kuchlibari (with 6 beds).
