= Changrabandha =

- Census Town
- Location in West Bengal, India Changrabandha (India)
- Coordinates: 26.4131°N 88.9193°E
- Country: India
- State: West Bengal
- District: Cooch Behar

Population (2011)
  - Total: 4,483

Languages
  - Official: Bengali, English
- Time zone: UTC+5:30 (IST)
- PIN: 735301
- STD/ Telephone code: 03584
- Lok Sabha constituency: Jalpaiguri
- Vidhan Sabha constituency: Mekhliganj
- Website: coochbehar.nic.in

Changrabandha (also called Nagar Changrabandha) is a census town and a gram panchayat in Mekhliganj CD block in Mekhliganj subdivision of Cooch Behar district in the state of West Bengal, India. It is a border checkpoint on the Bangladesh-India border.

== Geography ==
Places in the Mathabhanga, Mekhliganj subdivisions and Sitai CD block in Dinhata subdivision of Cooch Behar district
CT: census town, R: rural/ urban centre, M: Municipal town
Owing to space constraints in the small map, the actual locations in a larger map may vary slightly

=== Location ===
Changrabandha is located at 26.4131°N 88.9193°E.

=== Area overview ===
The map alongside shows the western part of the district. In Mekhliganj subdivision 9.91% of the population lives in the urban areas and 90.09% lives in the rural areas. In Mathabhanga subdivision 3.67% of the population, the lowest in the district, lives in the urban areas and 96.35% lives in the rural areas. The entire district forms the flat alluvial flood plains of mighty rivers.

Note: The map alongside presents some of the notable locations in the subdivisions. All places marked in the map are linked in the larger full screen map.

== Border checkpoint ==
Changrabandha is a land border checkpoint, on the Bangladesh-India border, being developed (in 2018) as an integrated checkpost (ICP) for the smooth movement of goods and people. The land port and checkpoint at Burimari in Lalmonirhat District of Rangpur Division is on the Bangladesh side of the border.

There is a customs office for export/import at Changrabandha.

=== CD Block HQ ===
The headquarters of Mekhliganj CD block is at Nagar Changrabandha.

== Demographics ==
As per the 2011 Census of India, Nagar Changrabandha had a total population of 4,483, of which 2,251 (50%) were males and 2,232 (50%) were females. Population below 6 years was 489. The total number of literates in Nagar Changrabanda was 3,172 (79.42% of the population over 6 years).

== Transport ==
Changrabandha railway station (station code CBD) and New Changrabandha railway station (station code NCBD) lies on the broad gauge New Mal-Changrabandha-New Cooch Behar line. A pair of DMUs have been introduced on this route from Siliguri to Changrabandha via New Mal Jn from 20 January 2016. Sealdah - New Alipurduar Padatik Superfast Express runs from New Changrabandha railway station. There is a train from New Cooch Behar to Siliguri Jn via Changrabandha.

Changrabandha is on State Highway 12A.

== Healthcare ==
Changrabandha Block Primary Centre, with 10 beds at Changrabandha, is the major government medical facility in the Mekhliganh CD block. Mekhliganj Subdivional Hospital, with 120 beds, functions at Mekhliganj.

== See also ==
- India-Bangladesh Border Ceremonies
