= Dinhata I =

- Community development block
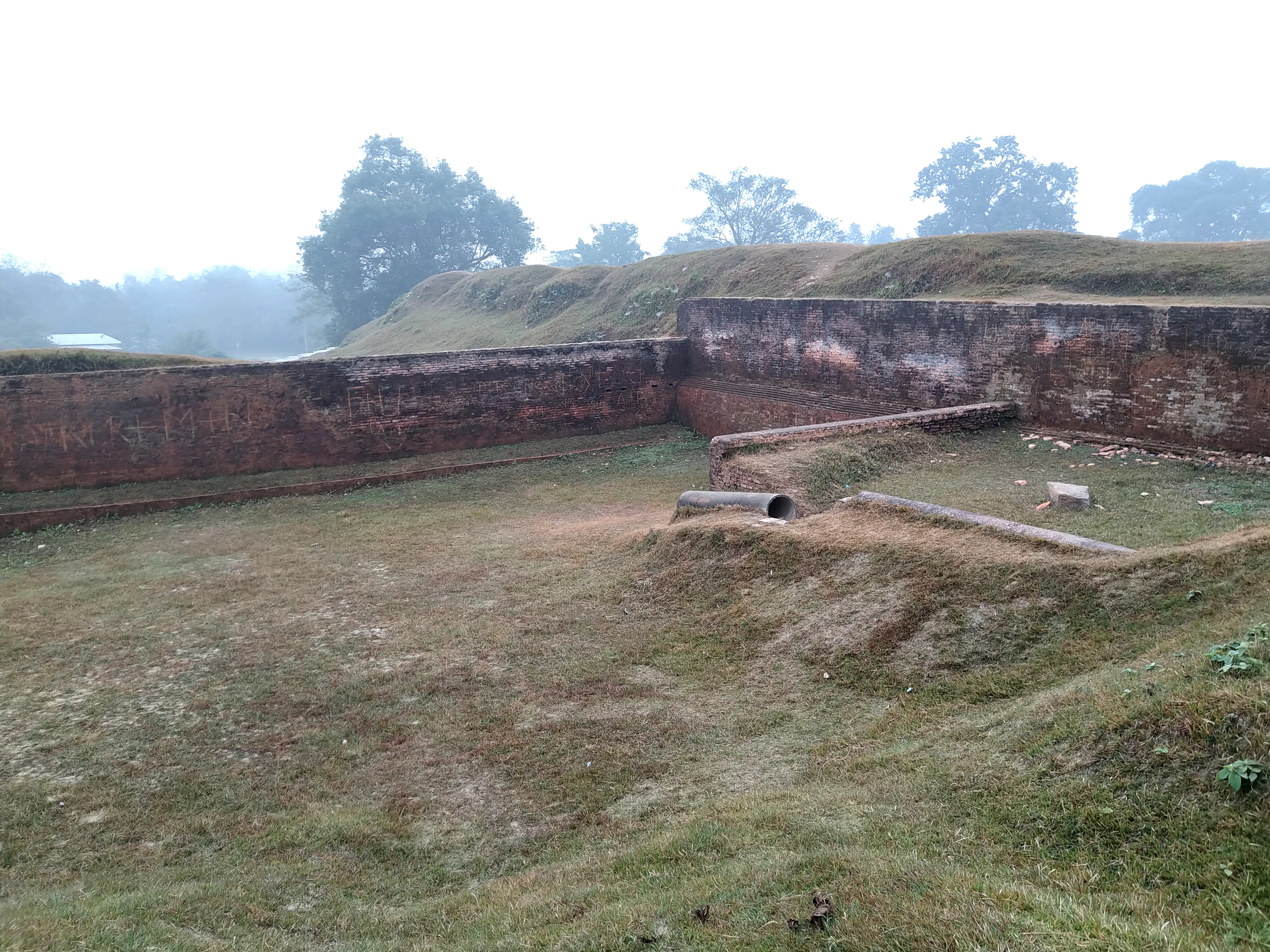
- The mound at Rajpat, part of the ruins of the capital of the medieval Kamata kingdom

- Coordinates: 26.1417237°N 89.4340324°E
- Country: India
- State: West Bengal
- District: Cooch Behar

Government
  - Type: Representative democracy

Area
  - Total: 279.67 km^{2} (107.98 sq mi)

Population (2011)
  - Total: 286,269
  - Density: 1,023.6/km^{2} (2,651.1/sq mi)

Languages
  - Official: Bengali, English
- Time zone: UTC+5:30 (IST)
- ISO 3166 code: IN-WB
- Lok Sabha constituency: Cooch Behar
- Vidhan Sabha constituency: Dinhata, Sitai
- Website: coochbehar.gov.in

Dinhata I is a community development block (CD block) that forms an administrative division in the Dinhata subdivision of the Cooch Behar district in the Indian state of West Bengal.

== Geography ==
Petla, one of the constituent panchayats of the block, is located at 26°08′30″N 89°26′03″E.

Topographically Cooch Behar district is generally plain land which is low and marshy at some places. “Considering the nature of general surface configuration, relief and drainage pattern, distribution of different types of soil, climatic condition, the formation of geology and forest tracts, the district Koch Bihar falls under Barind Tract. The physiology of this area consists of alluvial soil, generally blackish brown in colour and composed of sand, clay and silt. The soils are loose and sandy throughout the district.” The Himalayan formations in the north end beyond the boundaries of this district. There are no hills/ mountains here. It has a large network of rivers flowing from north-west to south and south-east. The Teesta flows through Mekhliganj CD block before entering Bangladesh. The Jaldhaka and its connected river-streams form a large catchment area in the district. It virtually divides the district into two unequal parts and meets the Brahmaputra in Bangladesh. The Himalayan rivers flowing through Cooch Behar district change courses from time to time. In 1876, W.W. Hunter mentioned the Dharla and the Torsha as the same stream with two names. However, since the advent of the 20th century, these are two different streams meeting the Brahmaputra in Bangladesh.

The hill-streams of Cooch Behar carry debris and silt from the Himalayas and are shallow. During the monsoons the speed of flow of the rivers almost doubles and the rivers overflow the banks causing floods and devastation. The Singimari, Dharla and Baniadaha are the major rivers causing floods in the Dinhata I and II CD blocks.

The Dinhata I CD block is bounded by the Tufanganj I and Cooch Behar I CD blocks on the north, the Dinhata II CD block on the east, the Phulbari Upazila in Kurigram District and Lalmonirhat Sadar Upazila in Lalmonirhat District of Bangladesh on the south and Sitai CD block on the west.

The Dinhata I CD block has an area of 279.67 km^{2}. It has 1 panchayat samity, 16 gram panchayats, 220 gram sansads (village councils), 130 mouzas, 128 inhabited villages and 1 census towns. Dinhata police station serves this block. Headquarters of this CD block is at Dinhata.

Community development blocks in Cooch Behar district

Gram panchayats of Dinhata I block/ panchayat samiti are: Bara Atiabari I, Bara Atiabari II, Bara Soulmari, Bhetaguri I, Bhetaguri II, Dinhata Village I, Dinhata Village II, Gitaldaha I, Gitaldaha II, Gosainmari I, Gasainmari II, Matalhat, Okrabari, Petla, Putimari I and Putimari II.

== Demographics ==
=== Population ===
According to the 2011 Census of India, the Dinhata I CD block had a population of 286,269, of which 281,810 were rural and 4,739 were urban. There were 147,602 (52%) males and 138,667 (48%) females. There were 35,376 persons in the age range of 0 to 6 years. The Scheduled Castes numbered 125,873 (43.97%) and the Scheduled Tribes numbered 1,171 (0.41%).

According to the 2001 census, Dinhata I block had a total population of 254,449, out of which 130,656 were males and 123,793 were females. Dinhata I block registered a population growth of 6.04 per cent during the 1991-2001 decade.

Census towns in the Dinhata I CD block are (2011 census figures in brackets): Bhangri Pratham Khanda (4,379).

Large villages (with 4,000+ population) in the Dinhata I CD block are (2011 census figures in brackets): Khalisa Gosanimari (6,410), Bhitar Kamata (5,559), Alokjhari (4,138), Petla (5,708), Bara Nachina (P) (14,759), Bhutkura (6,457), Singimari (5,950), Kharija Baladanga (5,766), Ruier Khuthi (6,710), Koalidaha (5,616), Dinhata (P) (7,215), Bhanghi Dwitiya Khanda (9,565), Jhuripara (P) (4,273), Bara Attabari Pratham Khanda (14,962) and Bhoram (4,129).

Other villages in the Dinhata I CD block include (2011 census figures in brackets): Gitaldaha (3,917), Puitmari (3,863).

=== Literacy ===
According to the 2011 census, the total number of literate persons in the Dinhata I CD block was 183,737 (73.23% of the population over 6 years) out of which males numbered 101,983 (78.79% of the male population over 6 years) and females numbered 81,754 (67.31% of the female population over 6 years). The gender disparity (the difference between female and male literacy rates) was 11.48%.

See also – List of West Bengal districts ranked by literacy rate

Literacy in CD blocks of
Cooch Behar district
Cooch Behar Sadar subdivision
Cooch Behar I – 76.56%
Cooch Behar II – 81.39%
Dinhata subdivision
Dinhata I – 73.23%
Dinhata II – 72.33%
Sitai – 62.79%
Mathabhanga subdivision
Sitalkuchi – 70.34%
Mathabhanga I – 71.51%
Mathabhanga II – 72.68%
Tufanganj subdivision
Tufanganj I – 73.69%
Tufanganj II – 75.75%
Mekhliganj subdivision
Mekhliganj – 69.34%
Haldibari – 69.22%
2011 Census: CD Block Wise

Primary Census Abstract Data

=== Language and religion ===
Religion in Dinhata I CD block (2011)
Hinduism	62.73%
Islam	36.98%
Other or not stated	0.29%

In the 2011 Census of India, Hindus numbered 179,567 and formed 62.73% of the population of Dinhata I CD block. Muslims numbered 105,868 and formed 36.98% of the population. Christians numbered 547 and formed 0.19% of the population. Others numbered 287 and formed 0.10% of the population.

Bengali is the predominant language, spoken by 99.34% of the population.

== Rural poverty ==
Based on a study of the per capita consumption in rural and urban areas, using central sample data of NSS 55th Round 1999–2000, Cooch Behar district had a rural poverty ratio of 25.62%.

According to a World Bank report, as of 2012, 20-26% of the population of Cooch Behar, Birbhum, Nadia and Hooghly districts were below poverty line, marginally higher than the level of poverty in West Bengal, which had an average 20% of the population below poverty line.

== Economy ==
=== Livelihood ===
Livelihood
in Dinhata I CD block
1. Cultivators (30.5%)
2. Agricultural labourers (39.1%)
3. Household industries (3.64%)
4. Other Workers (26.8%)

In the Dinhata I CD block in 2011, among the class of total workers, cultivators numbered 34,673 and formed 30.49%, agricultural labourers numbered 44,440 and formed 39.07%, household industry workers numbered 4,145 and formed 3.64% and other workers numbered 30,475 and formed 26.80%. Total workers numbered 113,733 and formed 39.73% of the total population, and non-workers numbered 172,536 and formed 60.27% of the population.

Note: In the census records a person is considered a cultivator, if the person is engaged in cultivation/ supervision of land owned by self/government/institution. When a person who works on another person's land for wages in cash or kind or share, is regarded as an agricultural labourer. Household industry is defined as an industry conducted by one or more members of the family within the household or village, and one that does not qualify for registration as a factory under the Factories Act. Other workers are persons engaged in some economic activity other than cultivators, agricultural labourers and household workers. It includes factory, mining, plantation, transport and office workers, those engaged in business and commerce, teachers, entertainment artistes and so on.

=== Infrastructure ===
There are 128 inhabited villages in the Dinhata I CD block, as per the District Census Handbook, Cooch Behar, 2011. All 128 villages have power supply and drinking water supply. 39 villages (30.47%) have post offices. 124 villages (96.88%) have telephones (including landlines, public call offices and mobile phones). 60 villages (46.88%) have pucca (paved) approach roads and 36 villages (28.12%) have transport communication (includes bus service, rail facility and navigable waterways). 11 villages (8.59%) have agricultural credit societies and 5 villages (3.91%) have banks.

=== Agriculture ===
Agriculture is the primary mode of living in the district. The entire Cooch Behar district has fertile soil and around half of the cultivated land in the district is cropped twice or more. Paddy (rice) and jute are the largest producing crops, followed by potatoes, vegetables and pulses. There are 23 tea gardens on glided slopes. There are some coconut, areca nut and betel leaf plantations. 77.6% of the land holdings are marginal.

In 2012–13, there were 91 fertiliser depots, 2 seed stores and 62 fair price shops in the Dinhata I CD block.

In 2012–13, the Dinhata I CD block produced 41,630 tonnes of Aman paddy, the main winter crop, from 20,156 hectares, 7,076 tonnes of Boro paddy (spring crop) from 2,471 hectares, 1,111 tonnes of Aus paddy (summer crop) from 852 hectares, 197 tonnes of wheat from 112 hectares, 10 tonnes of maize from 4 hectares, 98,575 tonnes of jute from 7,905 hectares and 72,614 tonnes of potatoes from 2,258 hectares. It also produced pulses and oilseeds.

In 2012–13, the total area irrigated in the Dinhata I CD block was 7,252 hectares, out of which 180 hectares were irrigated by private canal water, 690 hectares by tank water, 823 hectares by river lift irrigation, 423 hectares by deep tube wells, 4,026 hectares by shallow tube wells, 130 hectares by open dug wells, 1,020 hectares by other means.

=== Pisciculture ===
Being a river-bound district, pisciculture is an important economic activity in the Cooch Behar district. Almost all the rivers originating in the Himalayas have a lot of fish. The net area under effective pisciculture in 2010–11 in the Dinhata I CD block was 392.82 hectares. 7,345 persons were engaged in the profession and approximate annual production was 19,683 quintals.

=== Banking ===
In 2012–13, Dinhata I CD block had offices of 13 commercial banks and 3 gramin banks.

== Transport ==
Dinhata I CD block has 5 ferry services and 8 originating/ terminating bus routes.

The broad gauge Alipurduar-Bamanhat branch line passes through this block and there are stations at Dinhata, Falimari and New Gitaldaha.

== Education ==
In 2012–13, Dinhata I CD block had 177 primary schools with 14,528 students, 17 middle schools with 4,517 students, 8 high schools with 9,781 students and 10 higher secondary schools with 14,585 students. Dinhata I CD block had 1 technical/ professional institution with 86 students and 511 institutions for special and non-formal education with 10,591 students. Dinhata municipal area has 1 general degree college with 3,492 students and 3 technical/ professional institutions with 295 students (outside the block).

See also – Education in India

According to the 2011 census, in the Dinhata I CD block, among the 128 inhabited villages, 9 villages did not have schools, 62 villages had two or more primary schools, 41 villages had at least 1 primary and 1 middle school and 21 villages had at least 1 middle and 1 secondary school.

== Culture ==
The Dinhata I CD block has a heritage temple.

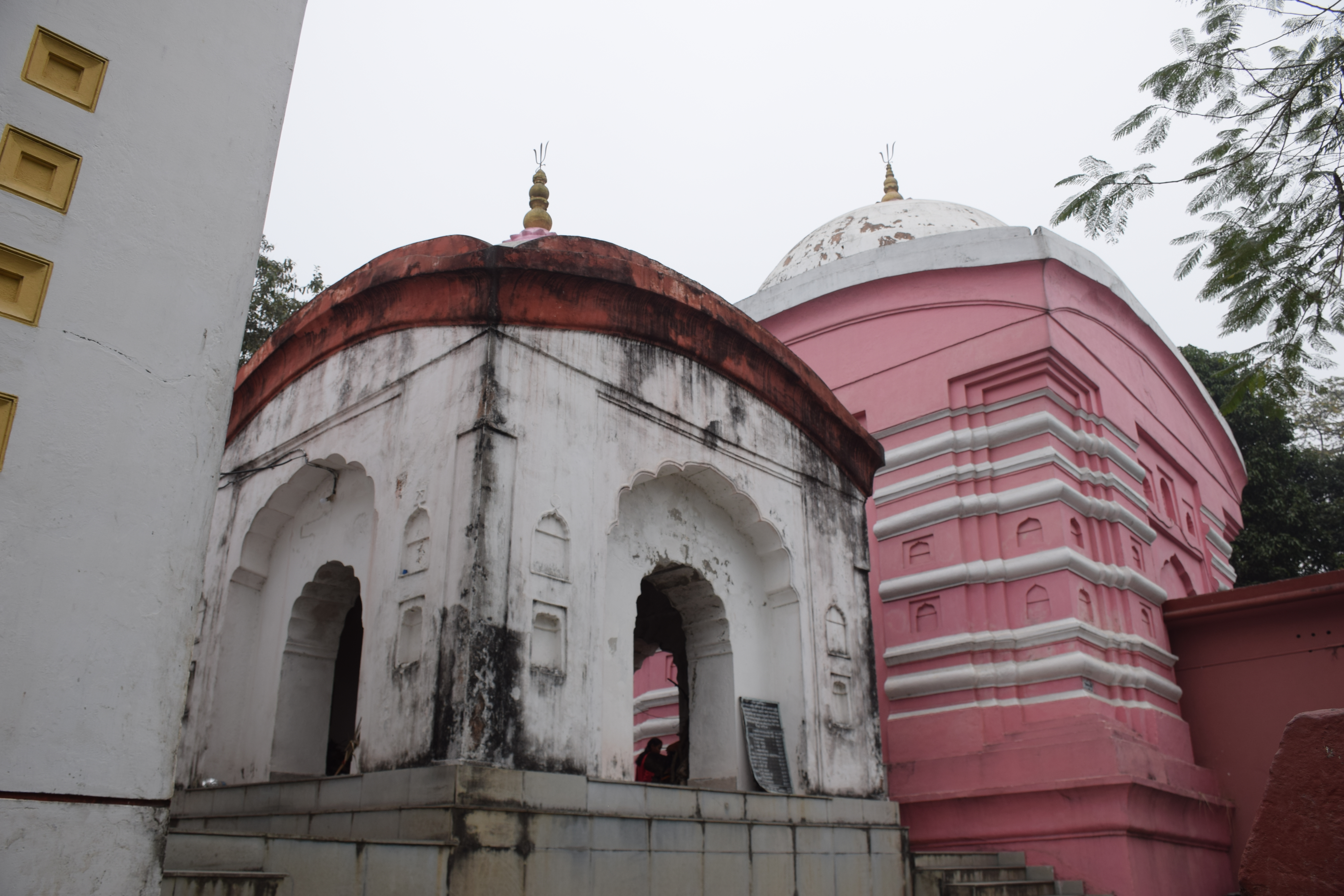
Gosanimari: The Kamteswari temple, char chala with a circular dome, was rebuilt in 1665.

== Healthcare ==
In 2013, Dinhata I CD block had 1 block primary health centre and 1 primary health centre with total 20 beds and 4 doctors (excluding private bodies). It had 47 family welfare subcentres. 7,890 patients were treated indoor and 53,708 patients were treated outdoor in the hospitals, health centres and subcentres of the CD block.

Gosanimari Block Primary Health Centre, with 30 beds at Gosanimari, is the major government medical facility in the Dinhata I CD block. There is a primary health centre at Okrabari (with 6 beds).
