= Mathabhanga I =

- Community development block
- Interactive map of Mathabhanga I
- Coordinates: 26.2911610°N 89.2314610°E
- Country: India
- State: West Bengal
- District: Cooch Behar

Government
  - Type: Representative democracy

Area
  - Total: 319.39 km^{2} (123.32 sq mi)

Population (2011)
  - Total: 218,191
  - Density: 683.15/km^{2} (1,769.3/sq mi)

Languages
  - Official: Bengali, English
- Time zone: UTC+5:30 (IST)
- Lok Sabha constituency: Cooch Behar
- Vidhan Sabha constituency: Mathabhanga, Sitalkuchi
- Website: coochbehar.gov.in

Mathabhanga I is a community development block (CD block) that forms an administrative division in the Mathabhanga subdivision of the Cooch Behar district in the Indian state of West Bengal.

== Geography ==
Jorpatki, a constituent panchayat of this block, is located at 26.2911610°N 89.2314610°E.

Topographically Cooch Behar district is generally plain land which is low and marshy at some places. “Considering the nature of general surface configuration, relief and drainage pattern, distribution of different types of soil, climatic condition, the formation of geology and forest tracts, the district Koch Bihar falls under Barind Tract. The physiology of this area consists of alluvial soil, generally blackish brown in colour and composed of sand, clay and silt. The soils are loose and sandy throughout the district.” The Himalayan formations in the north end beyond the boundaries of this district. There are no hills/ mountains here. It has a large network of rivers flowing from north-west to south and south-east. The Teesta flows through Mekhliganj CD block before entering Bangladesh. The Jaldhaka and its connected river-streams form a large catchment area in the district. It virtually divides the district into two unequal parts and meets the Brahmaputra in Bangladesh. The Himalayan rivers flowing through Cooch Behar district change courses from time to time. In 1876, W.W. Hunter mentioned the Dharla and the Torsha as the same stream with two names. However, since the advent of the 20th century, these are two different streams meeting the Brahmaputra in Bangladesh.

The hill-streams of Cooch Behar carry debris and silt from the Himalayas and are shallow. During the monsoons the speed of flow of the rivers almost doubles and the rivers overflow the banks causing floods and devastation. The Mansai, Sutunga, Dharla and Nenda are the major rivers causing floods in the Mathabhanga I CD block.

The Mathabhanga I CD block is bounded by the Mathabhanga II CD block on the north and the east, the Sitalkuchi CD block on the south, the Hatibandha Upazila of Lalmonirhat District of Bangladesh and Mekhliganj CD block on the west.

The Mathabhanga I CD block has an area of 319.39 km^{2}. It has 1 panchayat samity, 10 gram panchayats, 154 gram sansads (village councils), 102 mouzas and 101 inhabited villages. Mathabhanga police station serves this block. Headquarters of this CD block is at Sikarpur.

Gram panchayats of Mathabhanga I block/ panchayat samiti are: Bairagirhat, Gopalpur, Hazaraht I, Hazaraht II, Jorpatki, Kedarhat, Kurshamari, Nayarhat, Pachagarh and Sikarpur.

Community development blocks in Cooch Behar district

== Demographics ==
=== Population ===
According to the 2011 Census of India, the Mathabhanga I CD block had a population of 218,191, all of which were rural. There were 112,497 (52%) males and 105,694 (48%) females. There were 30,087 persons in the age range of 0 to 6 years. The Scheduled Castes numbered 150,056 (68.77%) and the Scheduled Tribes numbered 140 (0.06%).

According to the 2001 census, Mathabhanga I block had a population of 186,683, out of which 96,031 were males and 90,562 were females. Mathabhanga I block registered a population growth of 14.86 per cent during the 1991-2001 decade.

Large villages (with 4,000+ population) in the Mathabhanga I CD block are (2011 census figures in brackets): Bhogramguri (7,640), Buraburi (4,220), Chengarkhata Khagribari (4,792), Chhota Kesarbari (4,664), Panigram (8,522), Genduguri (4,445), Bhagamore (7,259), Asakbari Pratham Khanda (5,934), Bara Gharia Garkuta (4,531), Kauardara (4,506), Baisguri (4,642), Pachagar (5,800), Khaterbari (8,414) and Jorpatki (5,836).

Other villages in the Mathabahanga I CD block include (2011 census figures in brackets): Gopalpur (463), Kurshamari (2,952) and Sikarpur (1,546).

=== Literacy ===
According to the 2011 census, the total number of literate persons in the Mathabhanga I CD block was 134,517 (71.51% of the population over 6 years) out of which males numbered 76,500 (78.83% of the male population over 6 years) and females numbered 58,017 (63.71% of the female population over 6 years). The gender disparity (the difference between female and male literacy rates) was 15.12%.

See also – List of West Bengal districts ranked by literacy rate

Literacy in CD blocks of
Cooch Behar district
Cooch Behar Sadar subdivision
Cooch Behar I – 76.56%
Cooch Behar II – 81.39%
Dinhata subdivision
Dinhata I – 73.23%
Dinhata II – 72.33%
Sitai – 62.79%
Mathabhanga subdivision
Sitalkuchi – 70.34%
Mathabhanga I – 71.51%
Mathabhanga II – 72.68%
Tufanganj subdivision
Tufanganj I – 73.69%
Tufanganj II – 75.75%
Mekhliganj subdivision
Mekhliganj – 69.34%
Haldibari – 69.22%
2011 Census: CD Block Wise

Primary Census Abstract Data

=== Language and religion ===
Religion in Mathabhanga I CD block (2011)
Hinduism	80.77%
Islam	18.61%
Other or not stated	0.62%

In the 2011 Census of India, Hindus numbered 176,225 and formed 80.77% of the population of Mathabhanga I CD block. Muslims numbered 40,615 and formed 18.61% of the population. Christians numbered 47 and formed 0.02% of the population. Others numbered 1,304 and formed 0.60% of the population.

Languages of Mathabhanga I CD block (2011)
1. Bengali (91.0%)
2. 'Other' Bengali (6.30%)
3. Rajbongshi (2.44%)
4. Others (0.24%)

At the time of the 2011 census, 91.02% of the population spoke Bengali and 2.44% Rajbongshi as their first language. 6.30% were recorded as speaking 'Other' under Bengali.

== Rural poverty ==
Based on a study of the per capita consumption in rural and urban areas, using central sample data of NSS 55th Round 1999-2000, Cooch Behar district had a rural poverty ratio of 25.62%.

According to a World Bank report, as of 2012, 20-26% of the population of Cooch Behar, Birbhum, Nadia and Hooghly districts were below poverty line, marginally higher than the level of poverty in West Bengal, which had an average 20% of the population below poverty line.

== Economy ==
=== Livelihood ===
Livelihood
in Mathabhanga I CD block
1. Cultivators (47.2%)
2. Agricultural labourers (31.2%)
3. Household industries (1.71%)
4. Other Workers (19.8%)

In the Mathabhanga I CD block in 2011, among the class of total workers, cultivators numbered 46,317 and formed 47.24%, agricultural labourers numbered 30,606 and formed 31.21%, household industry workers numbered 1,676 and formed 1.71% and other workers numbered 19,457 and formed 19.84%. Total workers numbered 98,056 and formed 44.94% of the total population, and non-workers numbered 120,135 and formed 55.06% of the population.

Note: In the census records a person is considered a cultivator, if the person is engaged in cultivation/ supervision of land owned by self/government/institution. When a person who works on another person's land for wages in cash or kind or share, is regarded as an agricultural labourer. Household industry is defined as an industry conducted by one or more members of the family within the household or village, and one that does not qualify for registration as a factory under the Factories Act. Other workers are persons engaged in some economic activity other than cultivators, agricultural labourers and household workers. It includes factory, mining, plantation, transport and office workers, those engaged in business and commerce, teachers, entertainment artistes and so on.

=== Infrastructure ===
There are 101 inhabited villages in the Mathabhanga I CD block, as per the District Census Handbook, Cooch Behar, 2011. All the villages have power supply. 98 villages (97.03%) have drinking water supply. 23 villages (22.77%) have post offices. 81 villages (80.20%) have telephones (including landlines, public call offices and mobile phones). 43 villages (42.57%) have pucca (paved) approach roads and 23 villages (22.77%) have transport communication (includes bus service, rail facility and navigable waterways). 16 villages (15.84%) have agricultural credit societies and 6 villages (5.94%) have banks.

=== Agriculture ===
Agriculture is the primary mode of living in the district. The entire Cooch Behar district has fertile soil and around half of the cultivated land in the district is cropped twice or more. Paddy (rice) and jute are the largest producing crops, followed by potatoes, vegetables and pulses. There are 23 tea gardens on glided slopes. There are some coconut, areca nut and betel leaf plantations. 77.6% of the land holdings are marginal.

In 2012-13, there were 93 fertiliser depots, 1 seed store and 49 fair price shops in the Mathabahnga I CD block.

In 2012–13, the Mathabhanga I CD block produced 48,668 tonnes of Aman paddy, the main winter crop, from 19,640 hectares, 37,208 tonnes of Boro paddy (spring crop) from 9,845 hectares, 88 tonnes of Aus paddy (summer crop) from 43 hectares, 347 tonnes of wheat from 120 hectares, 97,005 tonnes of jute from 7,360 hectares and 87,786 tonnes of potatoes from 2,378 hectares. It also produced pulses and oilseeds.

In 2012-13, the total area irrigated in the Mathabhanga I CD block was 4,259 hectares, out of which 200 hectares were irrigated by private canal water, 150 hectares by tank water, 786 hectares by river lift irrigation, 128 hectares by deep tube wells, 1,416 hectares by shallow tube wells, 630 hectares by open dug wells, 948 hectares by other means.

=== Pisciculture ===
Being a river-bound district, pisciculture is an important economic activity in Cooch Behar district. Almost all the rivers originating in the Himalayas have a lot of fish. The net area under effective pisciculture in 2010-11 in Mathabhanga I CD block was 335.50 hectares. 16,820 persons were engaged in the profession and approximate annual production was 15,935 quintals.

=== Banking ===
In 2012-13, Mathabhanga I CD block had offices of 6 commercial banks and 4 gramin banks.

== Transport ==
Mathabhanga I CD block has 2 ferry services and 9 originating/ terminating bus routes. The nearest railway station from the block headquarters was 22 km away.

The New Mal-Changrabandha-New Cooch Behar line passes through this block and there are stations at Nayarhat and Jamaldah Gopalpur.

== Education ==
In 2012-13, Mathabhanga I CD block had 141 primary schools with 16,428 students, 40 middle schools with 24,805 students, 3 high schools with 3,908 students and 15 higher secondary schools with 19,810 students. Mathabhanga I CD block had 1 general degree college with 2,515 students, 422 institutions for special and non-formal education with 27,202 students.

See also – Education in India

According to the 2011 census, in the Mathabhanga I CD block, among the 101 inhabited villages, 6 villages did not have schools, 42 villages had two or more primary schools, 28 villages had at least 1 primary and 1 middle school and 15 villages had at least 1 middle and 1 secondary school.

== Healthcare ==
In 2013, Mathabhanga I CD block had 2 primary health centres with total 20 beds and 3 doctors (excluding private bodies). It had 30 family welfare subcentres. 7,123 patients were treated indoor and 45,359 patients were treated outdoor in the hospitals, health centres and subcentres of the CD block. There is a hospital, with 201 beds, in Mathabhanga municipal area (outside the CD block).

Asokbari Block Primary Health Centre, at PO Mathabhanga, has the facility of OPD only for the Mathabhanga I CD block. Mathabhanga Subdivisional Hospital functions with 120 beds. There are primary health centres at Pakhihaga (with 10 beds) and Panaguri (PO Shibpur) (with 10 beds).
