= Mathabhanga II =

- Community development block
- Interactive map of Mathabhanga II
- Coordinates: 26.3855649°N 89.2294121°E
- Country: India
- State: West Bengal
- District: Cooch Behar

Government
  - Type: Representative democracy

Area
  - Total: 309.99 km^{2} (119.69 sq mi)

Population (2011)
  - Total: 227,397
  - Density: 733.56/km^{2} (1,899.9/sq mi)

Languages
  - Official: Bengali, English
- Time zone: UTC+5:30 (IST)
- Lok Sabha constituency: Cooch Behar
- Vidhan Sabha constituency: Mathabhanga
- Website: coochbehar.gov.in

Mathabhanga II is a community development block (CD block) that forms an administrative division in the Mathabhanga subdivision of the Cooch Behar district in the Indian state of West Bengal.

== Geography ==
Angarkata Paradubi, a constituent panchayat of this block, is located at 26°23′08″N 89°13′46″E.

Topographically Cooch Behar district is generally plain land which is low and marshy at some places. “Considering the nature of general surface configuration, relief and drainage pattern, distribution of different types of soil, climatic condition, the formation of geology and forest tracts, the district Koch Bihar falls under Barind Tract. The physiology of this area consists of alluvial soil, generally blackish brown in colour and composed of sand, clay and silt. The soils are loose and sandy throughout the district.” The Himalayan formations in the north end beyond the boundaries of this district. There are no hills/ mountains here. It has a large network of rivers flowing from north-west to south and south-east. The Teesta flows through Mekhliganj CD block before entering Bangladesh. The Jaldhaka and its connected river-streams form a large catchment area in the district. It virtually divides the district into two unequal parts and meets the Brahmaputra in Bangladesh. The Himalayan rivers flowing through Cooch Behar district change courses from time to time. In 1876, W.W. Hunter mentioned the Dharla and the Torsha as the same stream with two names. However, since the advent of the 20th century, these are two different streams meeting the Brahmaputra in Bangladesh.

The hill-streams of Cooch Behar carry debris and silt from the Himalayas and are shallow. During the monsoons the speed of flow of the rivers almost doubles and the rivers overflow the banks causing floods and devastation. The Dudua, Gilandi, Jaldhaka, Torsha, Bura Torsha and Mansai are the major rivers causing floods in the Mathabhanga II CD block.

The Mathabhanga II CD block is bounded by the Dhupguri CD block in Jalpaiguri district and Falakata CD block in Alipurduar district on the north, the Cooch Behar II CD block on the east, the Cooch Behar I CD block on the south, the Mathabhanga I and Mekhlihanj CD blocks on the west.

The Mathabhanga II CD block has an area of 309.99 km^{2}. It has 1 panchayat samity, 10 gram panchayats, 168 gram sansads (village councils), 93 mouzas and 92 inhabited villages. Ghoksadanga police station serves this block. Headquarters of this CD block is at Matiar Kuthi.

Gram panchayats of Mathabhanga II block/ panchayat samiti are: Angerkata Paradubi, Bara Soulmari, Fulbari, Ghoksadanga, Latapata, Nishiganj I, Nishiganj II, Premerdnga, Ruidanga and Unishbisha.

Community development blocks in Cooch Behar district

== Demographics ==
=== Population ===
According to the 2011 Census of India, the Mathabhanga II CD block had a total population of 227,397, all of which were rural. There were 117,100 (51%) males and 110,297 (49%) females. There were 29,174 persons in the age range of 0 to 6 years. The Scheduled Castes numbered 147,625 (64.92%) and the Scheduled Tribes numbered 2,974 (1.31%).

According to the 2001 census, Mathabhanga II block had a total population of 196,256, out of which 100,933 were males and 95,323 were females. Mathabhanga II block registered a population growth of 16.31 per cent during the 1991-2001 decade.

Large villages (with 4,000+ population) in the Mathabhanga II CD block are (2011 census figures in brackets): Runibari (4,937), Chakiar Chhara (4,446), Baraibari (4,194), Ksheti (5,182), Phulbari (14,631), Singijani (5,296), Bara Saulmari (9,558), Ramthenga (6,269), Lotapota (6,587), Dwarikamari (4,894), Dauaguri (5,732), Rangamati (4,821), Angarkata Paradubi (9,475), Ruidanga Pratham Khanda (6,161), Chhota Simulguri (4,485), Bara Simulguri (11,466), Unish Basa (8,818), Bhogmara (5,126) and Khatimari (4,054), .

Other villages in the Mathabahanga II CD block include (2011 census figures in brackets): Mukuldanga (3,951) and Matiar Kuthi (1,592).

=== Literacy ===
According to the 2011 census, the total number of literate persons in the Mathabhanga II CD block was 144,069 (72.68% of the population over 6 years) out of which males numbered 81,033 (79.40% of the male population over 6 years) and females numbered 63,036 (65.55% of the female population over 6 years). The gender disparity (the difference between female and male literacy rates) was 13.85%.

See also – List of West Bengal districts ranked by literacy rate

Literacy in CD blocks of
Cooch Behar district
Cooch Behar Sadar subdivision
Cooch Behar I – 76.56%
Cooch Behar II – 81.39%
Dinhata subdivision
Dinhata I – 73.23%
Dinhata II – 72.33%
Sitai – 62.79%
Mathabhanga subdivision
Sitalkuchi – 70.34%
Mathabhanga I – 71.51%
Mathabhanga II – 72.68%
Tufanganj subdivision
Tufanganj I – 73.69%
Tufanganj II – 75.75%
Mekhliganj subdivision
Mekhliganj – 69.34%
Haldibari – 69.22%
2011 Census: CD Block Wise

Primary Census Abstract Data

=== Language and religion ===
Religion in Mathabhanga II CD block (2011)
Hinduism	84.46%
Islam	15.26%
Other or not stated	0.28%

In the 2011 Census of India, Hindus (192,054) formed 84.46% of the population of Mathabhanga II CD block. Muslims (34,692) formed 15.26% and Christians (413) 0.18% of the population. Others numbered 238 and formed 0.10% of the population.

Languages of Mathabhanga II CD block (2011)
1. Bengali (91.0%)
2. 'Other' Bengali (4.36%)
3. Rajbongshi (2.82%)
4. Sadri (0.91%)
5. Others (0.89%)

At the time of the 2011 census, 91.02% of the population spoke Bengali, 2.82% Rajbongshi and 0.91% Sadri as their first language. 4.36% were recorded as speaking 'Other' under Bengali.

== Rural poverty ==
Based on a study of the per capita consumption in rural and urban areas, using central sample data of NSS 55th Round 1999-2000, Cooch Behar district had a rural poverty ratio of 25.62%.

According to a World Bank report, as of 2012, 20-26% of the population of Cooch Behar, Birbhum, Nadia and Hooghly districts were below poverty line, marginally higher than the level of poverty in West Bengal, which had an average 20% of the population below poverty line.

== Economy ==
=== Livelihood ===
Livelihood
in Mathabhanga II CD block
1. Cultivators (34.2%)
2. Agricultural labourers (39.1%)
3. Household industries (2.64%)
4. Other Workers (24.1%)

In the Mathabhanga II CD block in 2011, among the class of total workers, cultivators numbered 30,968 and formed 34.25%, agricultural labourers numbered 35,321 and formed 39.06%, household industry workers numbered 2,383 and formed 2.64% and other workers numbered 21,745 and formed 24.05%. Total workers numbered 90,417 and formed 39.76% of the total population, and non-workers numbered 136,980 and formed 60.24% of the population.

Note: In the census records a person is considered a cultivator, if the person is engaged in cultivation/ supervision of land owned by self/government/institution. When a person who works on another person's land for wages in cash or kind or share, is regarded as an agricultural labourer. Household industry is defined as an industry conducted by one or more members of the family within the household or village, and one that does not qualify for registration as a factory under the Factories Act. Other workers are persons engaged in some economic activity other than cultivators, agricultural labourers and household workers. It includes factory, mining, plantation, transport and office workers, those engaged in business and commerce, teachers, entertainment artistes and so on.

=== Infrastructure ===
There are 92 inhabited villages in the Mathabhanga II CD block, as per the District Census Handbook, Cooch Behar, 2011. 100% villages have power supply. 91 villages (98.25%) have drinking water supply. 20 villages (21.74%) have post offices. 81 villages (88.04%) have telephones (including landlines, public call offices and mobile phones). 36 villages (39.13%) have pucca (paved) approach roads and 33 villages (35.87%) have transport communication (includes bus service, rail facility and navigable waterways). 2 villages (2.17%) have agricultural credit societies and 12 villages (13.04%) have banks.

=== Agriculture ===
Agriculture is the primary mode of living in the district. The entire Cooch Behar district has fertile soil and around half of the cultivated land in the district is cropped twice or more. Paddy (rice) and jute are the largest producing crops, followed by potatoes, vegetables and pulses. There are 23 tea gardens on glided slopes. There are some coconut, areca nut and betel leaf plantations. 77.6% of the land holdings are marginal.

In 2012-13, there were 60 fertiliser depots, 1 seed store and 40 fair price shops in the Mathabahnga II CD block.

In 2012–13, the Mathabhanga II CD block produced 52,530 tonnes of Aman paddy, the main winter crop, from 23,992 hectares, 14,380 tonnes of Boro paddy (spring crop) from 4,948 hectares, 100 tonnes of Aus paddy (summer crop) from 75 hectares, 281 tonnes of wheat from 147 hectares, 657 tonnes of maize from 270 hectares, 86,286 tonnes of jute from 5,133 hectares and 140,323 tonnes of potatoes from 4,973 hectares. It also produced pulses and oilseeds.

In 2012-13, the total area irrigated in the Mathabhanga II CD block was 5,597 hectares, out of which 240 hectares were irrigated by private canal water, 320 hectares by tank water, 793 hectares by river lift irrigation, 40 hectares by deep tube wells, 3,246 hectares by shallow tube wells, 103 hectares by open dug wells, 855 hectares by other means.

=== Pisciculture ===
Being a river-bound district, pisciculture is an important economic activity in Cooch Behar district. Almost all the rivers originating in the Himalayas have a lot of fish. The net area under effective pisciculture in 2010-11 in Mathabhanga II CD block was 295.00 hectares. 8,890 persons were engaged in the profession and approximate annual production was 15,796 quintals.

=== Banking ===
In 2012-13, Mathabhanga II CD block had offices of 7 commercial banks and 4 gramin banks.

== Transport ==
Mathabhanga II CD block has 1 ferry service and 8 originating/ terminating bus routes. The nearest railway station from the block headquarters was 8 km away.

The New Jalpaiguri–New Bongaigaon section of the Barauni–Guwahati line passes through this block and there is a stations at Ghoksadanga.

== Education ==
In 2012-13, Mathabhanga II CD block had 152 primary schools with 16,213 students, 15 middle schools with 15,011 students, 4 high schools with 3,150 students and 13 higher secondary schools with 21,235 students. Mathabhanga II CD block had 2 general degree colleges with 673 students, 1 technical/ professional institution with 122 students and 381 institutions for special and non-formal education with 23,212 students.

See also – Education in India

According to the 2011 census, in the Mathabhanga II CD block, among the 92 inhabited villages, 5 villages did not have schools, 51 villages had two or more primary schools, 33 villages had at least 1 primary and 1 middle school and 20 villages had at least 1 middle and 1 secondary school.

Madhusudan Hore Mahavidyalaya was established in 2011 at Nishiganj.

Ghoksadanga Birendra Mahavidyalaya was established in 2011 at Ghoksadanga.

== Healthcare ==
In 2013, Mathabhanga II CD block had 1 block primary health centre and 3 primary health centres with total 36 beds and 8 doctors (excluding private bodies). It had 33 family welfare subcentres. 7,801 patients were treated indoor and 44,225 patients were treated outdoor in the hospitals, health centres and subcentres of the CD block. There is a hospital, with 201 beds, in Mathabhanga municipal area (outside the CD block).

Ghoksadanga Rural Hospital, with 30 beds at Ghoksadanga, is the major government medical facility in the Mathabhanga II CD block. There are primary health centres at Angarkata Paradubi (PO Paradubi) (with 6 beds), Khetifulbari (PO Fulbari) (with 10 beds) and Nishiganj (with 10 beds).
