= Bara Haldibari =

Village in West Bengal, India

- Village
- Location within West Bengal Location within India
- Coordinates: 26°21′37″N 88°46′18″E
- Country: India
- State: West Bengal
- District: Koch Bihar
- Block: Haldibari

Government
  - Type: Sarpanch

Area
  - Total: 40.8 km^{2} (15.8 sq mi)
- Elevation: 74 m (243 ft)

Population (2011)
  - Total: 32,340
  - Density: 793/km^{2} (2,050/sq mi)

Languages
  - Common: Bengali
- Time zone: UTC+5:30 (IST)
- PIN: 735122
- STD code: 03561
- Vehicle registration: WB-64

Bara Haldibari is a village in the state of West Bengal, India. It is located near Bangladesh–India border, about 67 kilometres west of the district capital Koch Bihar. According to the 2011 census, the village had a population of 32,340.

== Geography ==
Bara Haldibari is located on the western bank of the Teesta River. It encompasses over 4080.27 hectares.

== Demographics ==
In 2011, there were 32,340 residents within the 7,488 households of Bara Haldibari. The male population was 16,473, while the female population was 15,867. The working population constituted 38.18% of the total population. The overall literacy rate stood at 61.76%, with 11,113 of the male residents and 8,859 of the female residents being literate.
