= List of West Bengal districts ranked by literacy rate =

This is a list of districts in the Indian state of West Bengal ranked by literacy rate as per provisional data of 2011 census.

With a literacy rate of 76.26% (male 81.69% and female 70.54%), above the national average of 74.04%, as per the 2011 Census, West Bengal ranks 20th amongst the 36 states and union territories in India in terms of literacy rate. Bihar, Arunachal Pradesh, Uttarpradesh & Karnataka has highest litrecy growth in india 2023 &2024. According to the 2023-2024 survey, the literacy rate of West Bengal was 82.6% (male 85.8% and female 79.3%).

Rank	District (West Bengal)	Literacy Rate (%) 2001 Census (excluding 0-6 age group)	Literacy Rate (%) 2011 Census (excluding 0-6 age group)	% Increase	CD Block links
1	Purba Medinipur	80.16	87.66	7.50	Literacy in CD blocks of Purba Medinipur district Tamluk subdivision Tamluk – 87.06% Sahid Matangini – 86.99% Panskura I – 83.65% Panskura II – 84.93% Nandakumar – 85.56% Chandipur – 87.81% Moyna – 86.33% Haldia subdivision Mahishadal – 86.21% Nandigram I – 84.89% Nandigram II – 89.16% Sutahata – 85.42% Haldia – 85.96% Contai subdivision Contai I – 89.32% Contai II – 88.33% Contai III – 89.88% Khejuri I – 88.90% Khejuri II – 85.37% Ramnagar I – 87.84% Ramnagar II – 89.38% Bhagabanpur II – 90.98% Egra subdivision Bhagabanpur I – 88.13% Egra I – 82.83% Egra II – 86.47% Patashpur I – 86.58% Patashpur II – 86.50% Source: 2011 Census: CD Block Wise Primary Census Abstract Data
2	Kolkata	80.86	87.14	6.28	Literacy in KMC wards North Kolkata Ward No. 1 – 86.12% Ward No. 2 – 94.24% Ward No. 3 – 86.74% Ward No. 4 – 89.27% Ward No. 5 – 90.32% Ward No. 6 – 81.12% Ward No. 7 – 87.65% Ward No. 8 – 93.57% Ward No. 9 – 91.60% Ward No. 10 – 92.38% Ward No. 11 – 87.96% Ward No. 12 – 84.95% Ward No. 13 – 83.39% Ward No. 14 – 87.87% Ward No. 15 – 88.89% Ward No. 16 – 88.62% Ward No. 17 – 92.30% Ward No. 18 – 78.72% Ward No. 19 – 89.29% Ward No. 20 – 85.93% Ward No. 21 – 78.12% Ward No. 22 – 85.07% Ward No. 23 – 71.14% Ward No. 24 – 73.16% Ward No. 25 – 85.49% Ward No. 26 – 82.34% Ward No. 27 – 88.19% Ward No. 28 – 79.39% Ward No. 29 – 70.69% Ward No. 30 – 88.71% Ward No. 31 – 88.28% Ward No. 32 – 75.73% Ward No. 33 – 91.17% Central Kolkata Ward No. 34 – 92.79% Ward No. 35 – 91.44% Ward No. 36 – 66.34% Ward No. 37 – 79.12% Ward No. 38 – 85.77% Ward No. 39 – 73.27% Ward No. 40 – 88.14% Ward No. 41 – 83.53% Ward No. 42 – 75.02% Ward No. 43 – 79.52% Ward No. 44 – 79.09% Ward No. 45 – 74.69% Ward No. 46 – 85.38% Ward No. 47 – 87.87% Ward No. 48 – 82.04% Ward No. 49 – 65.51% Ward No. 50 – 88.70% Ward No. 51 – 93.01% Ward No. 52 – 86.18% Ward No. 53 – 89.49% Ward No. 54 – 82.10% Ward No. 55 – 84.84% Ward No. 56 – 85.53% Ward No. 57 – 80.20% Ward No. 58 – 74.35% Ward No. 59 – 80.39% Ward No. 60 – 74.04% Ward No. 61 – 80.54% Ward No. 62 – 86.04% Ward No. 63 – 84.39% Ward No. 64 – 85.21% Ward No. 65 – 81.60% South Kolkata Ward No. 66 – 80.95% Ward No. 67 – 89.52% Ward No. 68 – 90.86% Ward No. 69 – 86.07% Ward No. 70 – 94.20% Ward No. 71 – 92.01% Ward No. 72 – 90.06% Ward No. 73 – 89.28% Ward No. 74 – 84.56% Ward No. 75 – 80.27% Ward No. 76 – 88.40% Ward No. 77 – 83.84% Ward No. 78 – 83.00% Ward No. 79 – 81.96% Ward No. 80 – 71.89% Ward No. 81 – 85.14% Ward No. 82 – 84.82% Ward No. 83 – 85.63% Ward No. 84 – 85.71% Ward No. 85 – 88.19% Ward No. 86 – 89.61% Ward No. 87 – 90.26% Ward No. 88 – 85.09% Ward No. 89 – 92.40% Ward No. 90 – 84.60% Ward No. 91 – 90.57% Ward No. 92 – 93.53% Ward No. 93 – 91.30% Ward No. 94 – 89.11% Ward No. 95 – 95.61% Ward No. 96 – 96.57% Ward No. 97 – 94.60% Ward No. 98 – 96.24% Ward No. 99 – 95.79% Ward No. 100 – 95.98% Ward No. 101 – 95.36% Ward No. 102 – 93.53% Ward No. 103 – 94.77% Ward No. 104 – 96.03% Ward No. 105 – 93.86% Ward No. 106 – 92.97% Ward No. 107 – 90.06% Ward No. 108 – 80.74% Ward No. 109 – 85.49% Ward No. 110 – 91.35% Ward No. 111 – 93.36% Ward No. 112 – 92.50% Ward No. 113 – 92.18% Ward No. 114 – 91.13% Ward No. 115 – 95.53% Ward No. 116 – 86.91% Ward No. 117 – 86.53% Ward No. 118 – 90.04% Ward No. 119 – 94.04% Ward No. 120 – 92.15% Ward No. 121 – 91.86% Ward No. 122 – 92.88% Ward No. 123 – 93.42% Ward No. 124 – 92.55% Ward No. 125 – 92.50% Ward No. 126 – 93.78% Ward No. 127 – 91.82% Ward No. 128 – 92.67% Ward No. 129 – 92.56% Ward No. 130 – 95.55% Ward No. 131 – 93.48% Ward No. 132 – 90.30% Ward No. 133 – 83.48% Ward No. 134 – 73.75% Ward No. 135 – 75.75% Ward No. 136 – 85.01% Ward No. 137 – 79.16% Ward No. 138 – 78.67% Ward No. 139 – 77.56% Ward No. 140 – 79.93% Ward No. 141 – 75.15% Note: The regional distribution is a broad one and there is some overlapping Source: 2011 Census: Ward-Wise Primary Census Abstract Data
3	North 24 Parganas	78.07	84.95	6.88	Literacy in CD blocks of North 24 Parganas district Barasat Sadar subdivision Amdanga – 80.69% Deganga – 79.65% Barasat I – 81.50% Barasat II – 77.71% Habra I – 83.15% Habra II – 81.05% Rajarhat – 83.13% Basirhat subdivision Baduria – 78.75% Basirhat I – 72.10% Basirhat II – 78.30% Haroa – 73.13% Hasnabad – 71.47% Hingalganj – 76.85% Minakhan – 71.33% Sandeshkhali I – 71.08% Sandeshkhali II – 70.96% Swarupnagar – 77.57% Bangaon subdivision Bagdah – 75.30% Bangaon – 79.71% Gaighata – 82.32% Barrackpore subdivision Barrackpore I – 85.91% Barrackpore II – 84.53% Source: 2011 Census: CD Block Wise; Primary Census Abstract Data
4	Howrah	77.01	83.85	6.84	Literacy in CD blocks of Howrah district Howrah Sadar subdivision Bally Jagachha – 87.75% Domjur – 81.33% Panchla – 78.98% Sankrail – 83.11% Jagatballavpur – 79.22% Uluberia subdivision Uluberia I – 77.39% Uluberia II – 78.05% Amta I – 81.26% Amta II – 81.47% Udaynarayanpur – 81.05% Bagnan I – 84.09% Bagnan II – 82.57% Shyampur I – 78.96% Shyampur II – 80.49% Source: 2011 Census: CD Block Wise; Primary Census Abstract Data
5	Hooghly	75.11	82.55	7.44	Literacy in CD blocks of Hooghly district Arambagh subdivision Arambagh – 79.10 Khanakul I – 77.73 Khanakul II – 79.16 Goghat I – 78.70 Goghat II – 77.24 Pursurah – 82.12 Chandannagar subdivision Haripal – 78.59 Singur – 84.01 Tarakeswar – 79.96 Chinsurah subdivision Balagarh – 76.94 Chinsurah Mogra – 83.01 Dhaniakhali – 75.66 Pandua – 75.86 Polba Dadpur – 75.14 Srirampore subdivision Chanditala I – 83.76 Chanditala II – 84.78 Jangipara – 75.34 Sreerampur Uttarpara – 87.33 Source: 2011 Census: CD Block Wise; Primary Census Abstract Data
6	Darjeeling	71.79	79.92	8.13	Literacy in CD blocks of Darjeeling district (2011) Darjeeling Sadar subdivision Darjeeling Pulbazar – 80.78% Rangli Rangliot – 80.50% Jorebunglow Sukhiapokhri – 82.54% Kalimpong subdivision Kalimpong I – 81.43% Kalimpong II – 79.68% Gorubathan – 76.88% Kurseong subdivision Kurseong – 81.15% Mirik subdivision Mirik – 80.84% Siliguri subdivision Matigara – 74.78% Naxalbari – 75.47% Phansidewa – 64.46% Kharibari – 67.37% Source: 2011 Census: CD Block Wise Primary Census Abstract Data
7	Paschim Medinipur	70.41	79.04	8.63	Literacy in CD blocks of Paschim Medinipur district Jhargram subdivision Binpur I – 69.74% Binpur II – 70.46% Gopiballavpur I – 65.44% Gopiballavpur II – 71.40% Jamboni – 72.63% Jhargram – 72.23% Nayagram – 63.70% Sankrail – 73.35% Medinipur Sadar subdivision Garhbeta I – 72.21% Garhbeta II – 75.87% Garhbeta III – 73.42% Keshpur – 77.88% Midnapore Sadar – 70.48% Salboni – 74.87% Ghatal subdivision Chandrakona I – 78.93% Chandrakona II – 75.96% Daspur I – 83.99% Daspur II – 85.62% Ghatal – 81.08% Kharagpur subdivision Dantan I – 73.53% Dantan II – 82.45% Debra – 82.03% Keshiari – 76.78% Kharagpur I – 77.06% Kharagpur II – 76.08% Mohanpur – 80.51% Narayangarh – 78.31% Pingla – 83.57% Sabang – 86.84% Source: 2011 Census: CD Block Wise Primary Census Abstract Data
8	South 24 Parganas	69.45	78.57	9.12	Literacy in CD blocks of South 24 Parganas district Alipore Sadar subdivision Bishnupur I – 78.33% Bishnupur II – 81.37% Budge Budge I – 80.57% Budge Budge II – 79.13% Thakurpukur Maheshtala – 83.54% Baruipur subdivision Baruipur – 76.46% Bhangar I – 72.06% Bhangar II – 74.49% Jaynagar I – 73.17% Jaynagar II – 69.71% Kultali – 69.37% Sonarpur – 79.70% Canning subdivision Basanti – 68.32% Canning I – 70.76% Canning II – 66.51% Gosaba – 78.98% Diamond Harbour subdivision Diamond Harbour I – 75.72% Diamond Harbour II – 76.91% Falta – 77.17% Kulpi – 75.49% Magrahat I – 73.82% Magrahat II – 77.41% Mandirbazar – 75.89% Mathurapur I – 73.93% Mathurapur II – 77.77% Kakdwip subdivision Kakdwip – 77.93% Namkhana – 85.72 Patharpratima – 82.11% Sagar – 84.21% Source: 2011 Census: CD Block Wise; Primary Census Abstract Data
9	Bardhaman	70.18	77.15	6.97	Literacy in CD blocks of Bardhaman district Bardhaman Sadar North subdivision Ausgram I – 69.39% Ausgram II – 68.00% Bhatar – 71.56% Burdwan I – 76.07% Burdwan II – 74.12% Galsi II – 70.05% Bardhaman Sadar South subdivision Khandaghosh – 77.28% Raina I – 80.20% Raina II – 81.48% Jamalpur – 74.08% Memari I – 74.10% Memari II – 74.59% Kalna subdivision Kalna I – 75.81% Kalna II – 76.25% Manteswar – 73.08% Purbasthali I – 77.59% Purbasthali II – 70.35% Katwa subdivision Katwa I – 70.36% Katwa II – 69.16% Ketugram I – 68.00% Ketugram II – 65.96% Mongalkote – 67.97% Durgapur subdivision Andal – 77.25% Faridpur Durgapur – 74.14% Galsi I – 72.81% Kanksa – 76.34% Pandabeswar – 73.01% Asansol subdivision Barabani – 69.58% Jamuria – 69.42% Raniganj – 73.86% Salanpur – 78.76% Source: 2011 Census: CD Block Wise Primary Census Abstract Data
10	Nadia	66.14	75.58	9.44	Literacy in CD blocks of Nadia district Tehatta subdivision Karimpur I – 67.70% Karimpur II – 62.04% Tehatta I – 70.72% Tehatta II – 68.52% Krishnanagar Sadar subdivision Kaliganj – 65.89% Nakashipara – 64.86% Chapra – 68.25% Krishnanagar I – 71.45% Krishnanagar II – 68.52% Nabadwip – 67.72% Krishnaganj – 72.86% Ranaghat subdivision Hanskhali – 80.11% Santipur – 73.10% Ranaghat I – 77.61% Ranaghat II – 79.38% Kalyani subdivision Chakdaha – 64.17% Haringhata – 82.15% Source: 2011 Census: CD Block Wise; Primary Census Abstract Data
11	Cooch Behar	66.30	75.49	9.19	Literacy in CD blocks of Cooch Behar district Cooch Behar Sadar subdivision Cooch Behar I – 76.56% Cooch Behar II – 81.39% Dinhata subdivision Dinhata I – 73.23% Dinhata II – 72.33% Sitai – 62.79% Mathabhanga subdivision Sitalkuchi – 70.34% Mathabhanga I – 71.51% Mathabhanga II – 72.68% Tufanganj subdivision Tufanganj I – 73.69% Tufanganj II – 75.75% Mekhliganj subdivision Mekhliganj – 69.34% Haldibari – 69.22% Source: 2011 Census: CD Block Wise Primary Census Abstract Data
12	Dakshin Dinajpur	63.59	73.86	10.27	Literacy in CD blocks of Dakshin Dinajpur district Balurghat subdivision Balurghat – 73.96% Hili – 76.04% Kumarganj – 74.57% Tapan – 68.62% Gangrampur subdivision Bansihari – 68.79% Gangarampur – 71.45% Harirampur – 64.67% Kushmandi – 65.43% Source: 2011 Census: CD Block Wise; Primary Census Abstract Data
13	Jalpaiguri	62.85	73.79	10.94	Literacy in CD blocks of Jalpaiguri district Jalpaiguri Sadar subdivision Rajganj – 62.82% Jalpaiguri – 73.81% Maynaguri – 75.63% Dhupguri – 60.57% Malbazar subdivision Mal – 66.31 Matiali – 66.98% Nagrakata – 61.27% Alipurduar subdivision Madarihat-Birpara – 67.77% Kalchini – 68.96% Kumargram – 72.42% Alipurduar I – 78.19% Alipurduar II – 75.76% Falakata – 72.64% Source: 2011 Census: CD Block Wise Primary Census Abstract Data
14	Bankura	63.44	70.95	7.51	Literacy in CD blocks of Bankura district Bankura Sadar subdivision Saltora – 61.45% Mejia – 66.83% Gangajalghati – 68.11% Chhatna – 65.73% Bankura I – 68.74% Bankura II – 73.59% Barjora – 71.67% Onda – 65.82% Bishnupur subdivision Indas – 71.70% Joypur – 74.57% Patrasayer – 64.8% Kotulpur – 78.01% Sonamukhi – 66.16% Bishnupur – 66.30% Khatra subdivision Indpur – 67.42% Ranibandh – 68.53% Khatra – 72.18% Hirbandh – 64.18% Raipur – 71.33% Sarenga – 74.25% Simlapal – 68.44% Taldangra – 70.87% Source: 2011 Census: CD Block Wise Primary Census Abstract Data
15	Birbhum	61.48	70.90	9.42	Literacy in CD blocks of Birbhum district Rampurhat subdivision Murarai I – 55.67% Murarai II – 58.28% Nalhati I – 69.83% Nalhati II – 71.68% Rampurhat I – 73.29% Rampurhat II – 70.77% Mayureswar I – 71.52% Mayureswar II – 70.89% Suri Sadar subdivision Mohammad Bazar – 65.18% Rajnagar – 68.10% Suri I – 72.75% Suri II – 72.75% Sainthia – 72.33% Dubrajpur – 68.26% Khoyrasol – 68.75% Bolpur subdivision Bolpur Sriniketan – 70.67% Ilambazar – 74.27% Labpur – 71.20% Nanoor – 69.45% Source: 2011 Census: CD Block Wise Primary Census Abstract Data
16	Murshidabad	54.35	67.53	13.18	Literacy in CD blocks of Murshidabad district Jangipur subdivision Farakka – 59.75% Samserganj – 54.98% Suti I – 58.40% Suti II – 55.23% Raghunathganj I – 64.49% Raghunathganj II – 61.17% Sagardighi – 65.27% Lalbag subdivision Murshidabad-Jiaganj – 69.14% Bhagawangola I - 57.22% Bhagawangola II – 53.48% Lalgola– 64.32% Nabagram – 70.83% Sadar subdivision Berhampore – 73.51% Beldanga I – 70.06% Beldanga II – 67.86% Hariharpara – 69.20% Naoda – 66.09% Kandi subdivision Kandi – 65.13% Khargram – 63.56% Burwan – 68.96% Bharatpur I – 62.93% Bharatpur II – 66.07% Domkol subdivision Domkal – 55.89% Raninagar I – 57.81% Raninagar II – 54.81% Jalangi – 58.73% Source: 2011 Census: CD Block Wise; Primary Census Abstract Data
17	Purulia	55.57	65.38	9.81	Literacy in CD blocks of Purulia district Purulia Sadar subdivision Arsha – 57.48% Balarampur – 60.40% Hura – 68.79% Purulia I – 78.37% Purulia II – 63.39% Manbazar subdivision Barabazar – 63.27 Bandwan – 61.38% Manbazar I – 63.78% Manbazar II – 60.27% Puncha – 68.14% Jhalda subdivision Baghmundi – 57.17% Jhalda I – 66.18% Jhalda II – 54.76% Joypur – 57.94% Raghunathpur subdivision Para – 65.62% Raghunathpur I – 67.36% Raghunathpur II – 67.29% Neturia – 65.14% Santuri – 64.15% Kashipur – 71.06% Source: 2011 Census: CD Block Wise Primary Census Abstract Data
18	Maldah	50.28	62.71	8.43	Literacy in CD blocks of Malda district Malda Sadar subdivision Gazole – 63.07% Bamangola – 68.09% Habibpur – 58.81% Old Malda – 59.61% English Bazar – 63.03% Manikchak – 57.77% Kaliachak I – 65.25% Kaliachak II – 64.89% Kaliachak III – 54.16% Chanchal subdivision Harishchandrapur I – 52.47% Harishchandrapur II – 54.34% Chanchal I – 65.09% Chanchal II – 57.38% Ratua I – 60.13% Ratua II – 56.19% Source: 2011 Census: CD Block Wise; Primary Census Abstract Data
19	Uttar Dinajpur	47.89	60.13	12.24	Literacy in CD blocks of Uttar Dinajpur district Raiganj subdivision Raiganj – 63.52% Hemtabad – 67.88% Kaliaganj – 66.50% Itahar – 58.95% Islampur subdivision Chopra – 59.90% Islampur – 53.53% Goalpokhar I – 42.26% Goalpokhar II – 46.07% Karandighi – 53.42% Source: 2011 Census: CD Block Wise; Primary Census Abstract Data

== See also ==
- Indian states ranking by literacy rate
