= Bhangri Pratham Khanda =

- Census Town
- Location in West Bengal, India Bhangri Pratham Khanda (India) Bhangri Pratham Khanda (Asia)
- Coordinates: 26.1247°N 89.4701°E
- Country: India
- State: West Bengal
- District: Cooch Behar

Area
  - Total: 1.46 km^{2} (0.56 sq mi)

Population (2011)
  - Total: 4,379
  - Density: 3,000/km^{2} (7,770/sq mi)

Languages
  - Official: Bengali
  - Additional official: English
- Time zone: UTC+5:30 (IST)
- Vehicle registration: WB
- Website: coochbehar.gov.in

Bhangri Pratham Khanda is a census town in the Dinhata I CD block in the Dinhata subdivision of the Cooch Behar district in the state of West Bengal, India.

== Geography ==
Places in the Tufanganj and Dinhata subdivisions (except Sitai CD block) in Cooch Behar district
CT: census town, M: municipal town, R: rural/ urban centre, H: historical/ religious centre
Owing to space constraints in the small map, the actual locations in a larger map may vary slightly

=== Location ===
Bhangri Pratham Khanda is located at 26.1247°N 89.4701°E.

=== Area overview ===
The map alongside shows the eastern part of the district. In Tufanganj subdivision 6.97% of the population lives in the urban areas and 93.02% lives in the rural areas. In Dinhata subdivision 5.98% of the population lives in the urban areas and 94.02% lives in the urban areas. The entire district forms the flat alluvial flood plains of mighty rivers.

Note: The map alongside presents some of the notable locations in the subdivisions. All places marked in the map are linked in the larger full screen map.

== Demographics ==
As per the 2011 Census of India, Bhangri Pratham Khanda had a total population of 4,379. There were 2,277 (52%) males and 2,102 (48%) females. There were 433 persons in the age range of 0 to 6 years. The total number of literate people in Bhangri Pratham Khanda was 3,332 (84.44% of the population over 6 years).

As of 2001 India census, Bhangri Pratham Khanda had a population of 4113. Males constitute 51% of the population and females 49%. Bhangri Pratham Khanda has an average literacy rate of 69%, higher than the national average of 59.5%; with male literacy of 75% and female literacy of 63%. 12% of the population is under 6 years of age.

== Infrastructure ==
According to the District Census Handbook 2011, Koch Bihar, Bhangri Pratham Khanda covered an area of 1.46 km^{2}. Among the civic amenities, it had 7.5 km roads, the protected water supply involved hand pumps. It had 395 electric connections. Among the educational facilities it had 3 primary schools, other educational facilities were at Dinhata 2 km away. Important commodities it produced were bamboo craft and chewing tobacco.
