= Sikarpur, Cooch Behar =

Sikarpur
- Village
- Location in West Bengal, India Sikarpur (India)
- Coordinates: 26.343161°N 89.157461°E
- Country: India
- State: West Bengal
- District: Cooch Behar

Population (2011)
  - Total: 1,546
- Time zone: UTC+5:30 (IST)
- PIN: 736146
- Telephone/STD code: 03583
- Vehicle registration: WB
- Lok Sabha constituency: Cooch Behar
- Vidhan Sabha constituency: Sitalkuchi
- Website: coochbehar.gov.in

Sikarpur is a village and a gram panchayat in the Mathabhanga I CD block in the Mathabhanga subdivision of the Cooch Behar district in the state of West Bengal, India.

== Geography ==
Places in the Mathabhanga, Mekhliganj subdivisions and Sitai CD block in Dinhata subdivision of Cooch Behar district
CT: census town, R: rural/ urban centre, M: Municipal town
Owing to space constraints in the small map, the actual locations in a larger map may vary slightly

=== Location ===
Sikarpur is located at 26.343161°N 89.157461°E.

=== Area overview ===
The map alongside shows the western part of the district. In Mekhliganj subdivision 9.91% of the population lives in the urban areas and 90.09% lives in the rural areas. In Mathabhanga subdivision 3.67% of the population, the lowest in the district, lives in the urban areas and 96.35% lives in the rural areas. The entire district forms the flat alluvial flood plains of mighty rivers.

Note: The map alongside presents some of the notable locations in the subdivisions. All places marked in the map are linked in the larger full screen map.

== Civic administration ==
=== CD block HQ ===
The headquarters of the Mathabhanga I CD block are located at Sikarpur.

== Demographics ==
As per the 2011 Census of India, Sikarpur had a total population of 1,546. There were 792 (51%) males and 754 (49%) females. There were 214 persons in the age range of 0 to 6 years. The total number of literate people in Sikarpur was 937 (70.35% of the population over 6 years).
