= Ghoksadanga railway station =

Railway station in West Bengal, India

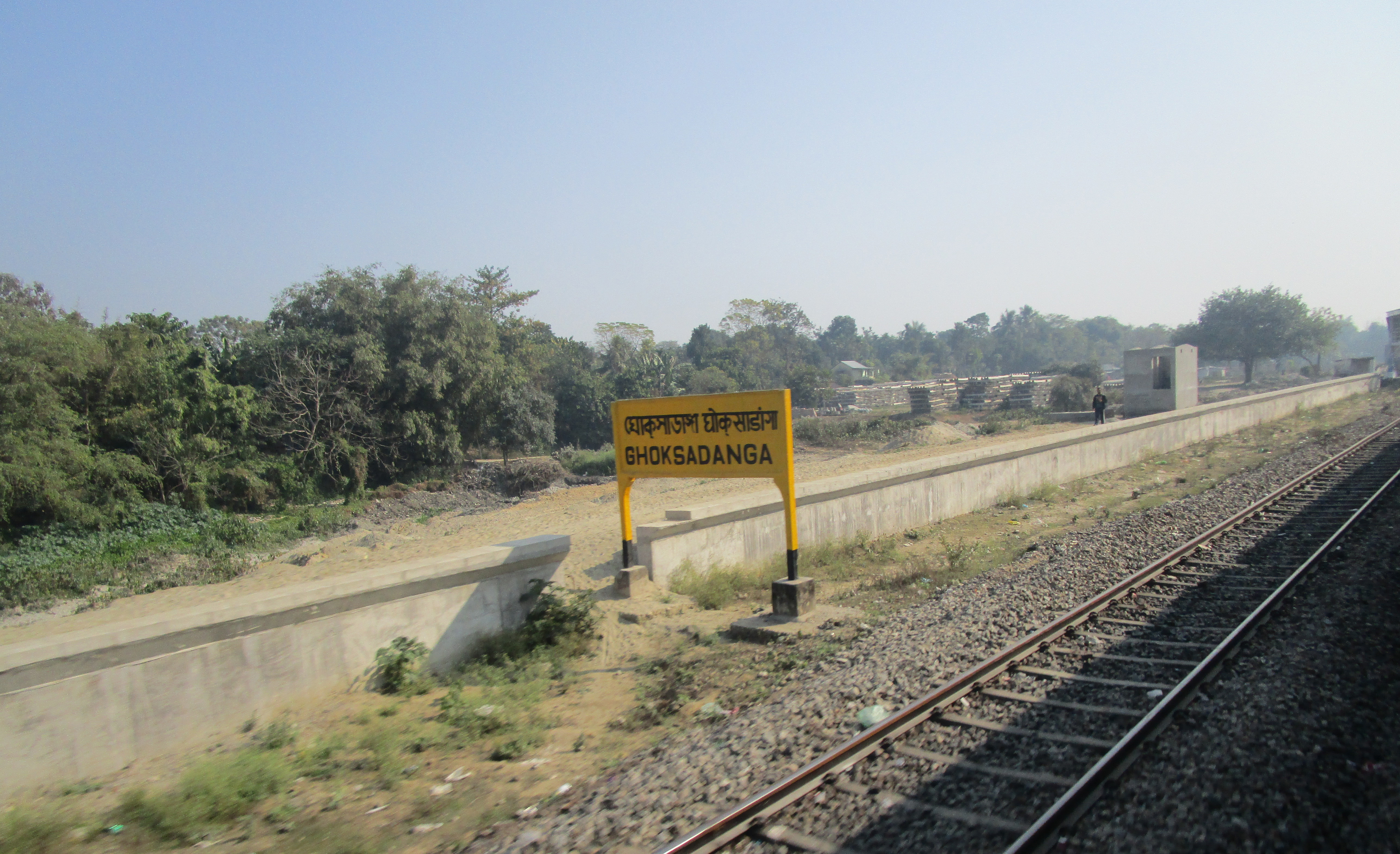
- Ghoksadanga station signboard Location of Ghoksadanga railway station

General information
- Location: Ghoksadanga, Cooch Behar, West Bengal; India
- Coordinates: 26°25′21″N 89°16′40″E
- Elevation: 58 metres (190 ft)
- System: Indian Railways station
- Owner: Indian Railways
- Operator: NFR
- Line: Barauni–Guwahati line
- Platforms: 2
- Tracks: 4

Construction
- Structure type: At grade
- Parking: Yes
- Cycle facilities: Yes

Other information
- Status: Functioning
- Station code: GDX
- Zone(s): Northeast Frontier Railway
- Division(s): Alipurduar
Location
- Location within West Bengal Location within India

Ghoksadanga railway station serves Ghoksadanga town in Cooch Behar district in the Indian state of West Bengal. Its station code is GDX.

This station on the Barauni–Guwahati line of Northeast Frontier Railway consists of two platforms and four tracks with one FOB.

== Trains ==
Important trains like Sealdah -New Alipurduar Teesta Torsha Express, New Jalpaiguri - Bongaigaon Express etc are available from this station. A number of trains connect to Ghoksadanga railway station. Live status of arrivals and departures on this station can be checked on Indian Railways website.
