= Matiar Kuthi =

- Village
- Location in West Bengal, India Matiar Kuthi (India)
- Coordinates: 26.336368°N 89.253772°E
- Country: India
- State: West Bengal
- District: Cooch Behar

Population (2011)
  - Total: 1,592
- Time zone: UTC+5:30 (IST)
- PIN: 736157
- Telephone/STD code: 03561
- Vehicle registration: WB
- Lok Sabha constituency: Cooch Behar
- Vidhan Sabha constituency: Mathabhanga
- Website: coochbehar.gov.in

Matiar Kuthi is a village in the Mathabhanga II CD block in the Mathabhanga subdivision of the Cooch Behar district in the state of West Bengal, India.

== Geography ==
Places in the Mathabhanga, Mekhliganj subdivisions and Sitai CD block in Dinhata subdivision of Cooch Behar district
CT: census town, R: rural/ urban centre, M: Municipal town
Owing to space constraints in the small map, the actual locations in a larger map may vary slightly

=== Location ===
Matiar Kuthi is located at 26.336368°N 89.253772°E.

=== Area overview ===
The map alongside shows the western part of the district. In Mekhliganj subdivision 9.91% of the population lives in the urban areas and 90.09% lives in the rural areas. In Mathabhanga subdivision 3.67% of the population, the lowest in the district, lives in the urban areas and 96.35% lives in the rural areas. The entire district forms the flat alluvial flood plains of mighty rivers.

Note: The map alongside presents some of the notable locations in the subdivisions. All places marked in the map are linked in the larger full screen map.

== Civic administration ==
=== CD block HQ ===
The headquarters of the Mathabhanga II CD block are located at Matiar Kuthi.

== Demographics ==
As per the 2011 Census of India, Matiar Kuthi had a total population of 1,592. There were 819 (51%) males and 773 (49%) females. There were 204 persons in the age range of 0 to 6 years. The total number of literate people in Matiar Kuthi was 904 (65.13% of the population over 6 years).
