= Kuchlibari =

- Village
- Location in West Bengal, India Kuchlibari (India)
- Coordinates: 26.3032°N 88.9894°E
- Country: India
- State: West Bengal
- District: Cooch Behar

Population (2011)
  - Total: 610
- Time zone: UTC+5:30 (IST)
- PIN: 735304
- Telephone/STD code: 03584
- Vehicle registration: WB
- Lok Sabha constituency: Jalpaiguri
- Vidhan Sabha constituency: Mekliganj
- Website: coochbehar.gov.in

Kuchlibari is a village in the Mekhliganj CD block in the Mekhliganj subdivision of the Cooch Behar district in the state of West Bengal, India.

== Geography ==
Places in the Mathabhanga, Mekhliganj subdivisions and Sitai CD block in Dinhata subdivision of Cooch Behar district
CT: census town, R: rural/ urban centre, M: Municipal town
Owing to space constraints in the small map, the actual locations in a larger map may vary slightly

=== Location ===
Kuchlibari is located at 26.3032°N 88.9894°E.

=== Area overview ===
The map alongside shows the western part of the district. In Mekhliganj subdivision 9.91% of the population lives in the urban areas and 90.09% lives in the rural areas. In Mathabhanga subdivision 3.67% of the population, the lowest in the district, lives in the urban areas and 96.35% lives in the rural areas. The entire district forms the flat alluvial flood plains of mighty rivers.

Note: The map alongside presents some of the notable locations in the subdivisions. All places marked in the map are linked in the larger full screen map.

== Civic administration ==
=== Police station ===
Kuchlibari police station has jurisdiction over a part of Mekhliganj CD block. Kuchlibari police station covers an area of 41.17 sq km.

== Demographics ==
As per the 2011 Census of India, Kuchlibari had a total population of 610. There were 312 (51%) males and 298 (49%) females. There were 52 persons in the age range of 0 to 6 years. The total number of literate people in Kuchlibari was 469 (84.05% of the population over 6 years).
