= Mekhliganj =

- City
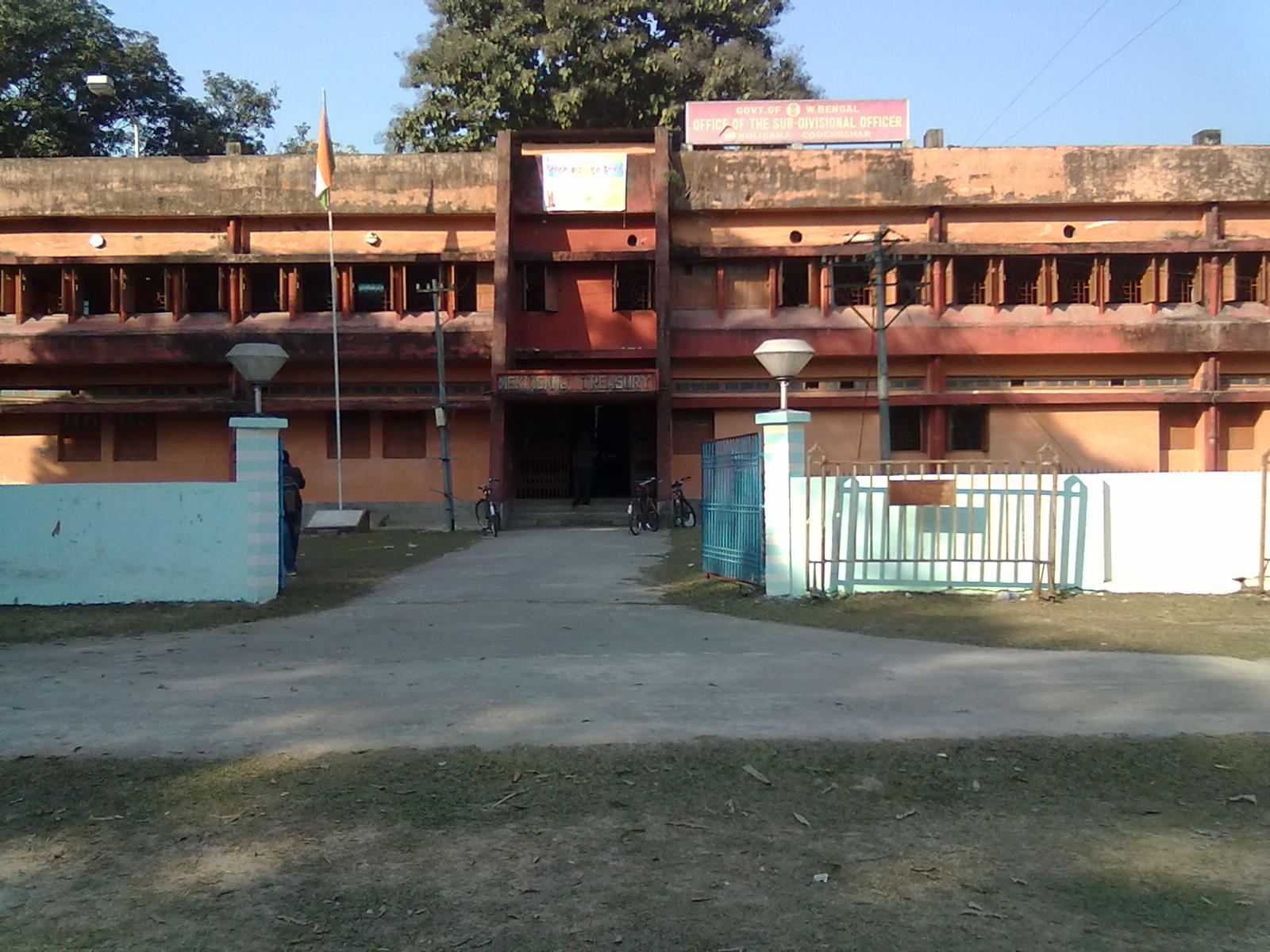
- SDO Office, Mekhliganj

- Location in West Bengal, India Mekhliganj (India) Mekhliganj (Asia)
- Coordinates: 26.35°N 88.92°E
- Country: India
- State: West Bengal
- District: Cooch Behar

Government
  - Type: Municipality
  - Body: Mekhliganj Municipality

Area
  - Total: 3.88 km^{2} (1.50 sq mi)
- Elevation: 58 m (190 ft)

Population (2011)
  - Total: 9,217
  - Density: 2,380/km^{2} (6,150/sq mi)

Languages
  - Official: Bengali
  - Additional official: English
- Time zone: UTC+5:30 (IST)
- Lok Sabha constituency: Jalpaiguri
- Vidhan Sabha constituency: Mekliganj
- Website: coochbehar.nic.in

Mekhliganj (Bengali pronunciation: [mekʰliɡɔnd͡ʒ]), is a city and a municipality in Cooch Behar district in the Indian state of West Bengal. It is the headquarters of the Mekhliganj subdivision. Earlier it was a Zamindari divided mainly in 3 parts under the Cooch Behar Kingdom. Sikarwar Rajputs, the trading clan along with other local clans started the process of rehabilitation in Mekliganj. It is said that the elephant in the Royal Symbol of Koch Kingdom, was a gift from the Sikarwar Rajputs to the Koch King, Shri Shri Maharaja Shivendra Narayan, in return of fertile land near the Teesta River and 2 Rupees as nazrana. Later the Rajputs established Chattradhari Estate here. After the succession by Shri Shri Maharaja Narendra Narayan named this place to Mekhliganj, a place where 'Mekhla' (born as Simha) also (people from Narmada) people stays.

== Geography ==
Places in the Mathabhanga, Mekhliganj subdivisions and Sitai CD block of Dinhata subdivision in Cooch Behar district
CT: census town, R: rural/ urban centre, M: Municipal town
Owing to space constraints in the small map, the actual locations in a larger map may vary slightly

=== Location ===
Mekliganj is at 26.35°N 88.92°E. It adjoins the boundary of Teesta River. It has an average elevation of 58 m (190 ft). Also it is situated very near to Saniajan River

According to the District Census Handbook 2011, Koch Bihar, Mekliganj covered an area of 3.88 km^{2}.

=== Area overview ===
The map alongside shows the western part of the district. In Mekhliganj subdivision, 9.91% of the population lives in the urban areas and 90.09% in the rural areas. In Mathabhanga subdivision 3.67% of the population, the lowest in the district, lives in the urban areas and 96.35% lives in the rural areas. The entire district forms the flat alluvial flood plains of mighty rivers.

Note: The map alongside presents some of the notable locations in the subdivisions. All places marked in the map are linked in the larger full-screen map.

== Demographics ==
As per 2011 Census of India Mekliganj had a total population of 9,217 of which 4,664 (51%) were males and 4,463 (49%) were females. Population in the age range 0–6 years was 1,098. The total number of literate persons in Mekliganj was 6,009 (74.84% of the population over 6 years).

As of 2001 India census, Mekliganj had a population of 10,833. Males constitute 52% of the population and females 48%. Mekliganj has an average literacy rate of 61%, higher than the national average of 59.5%: male literacy is 68%, and female literacy is 53%. In Mekliganj, 14% of the population is under 6 years of age.

== Civic administration ==
=== Police station ===
Mekhliganj police station has jurisdiction over Mekhligaganj municipal area and a part of Mekhliganj CD block.

== Education ==
Founded in 1996, Mekliganj College is an undergraduate college situated at Mekhliganj.

== Healthcare ==
Mekhliganj Subdivional Hospital, with 120 beds, functions at Mekhliganj.
