= Cooch Behar Panchanan Barma University =

Public university in Cooch Behar, West Bengal

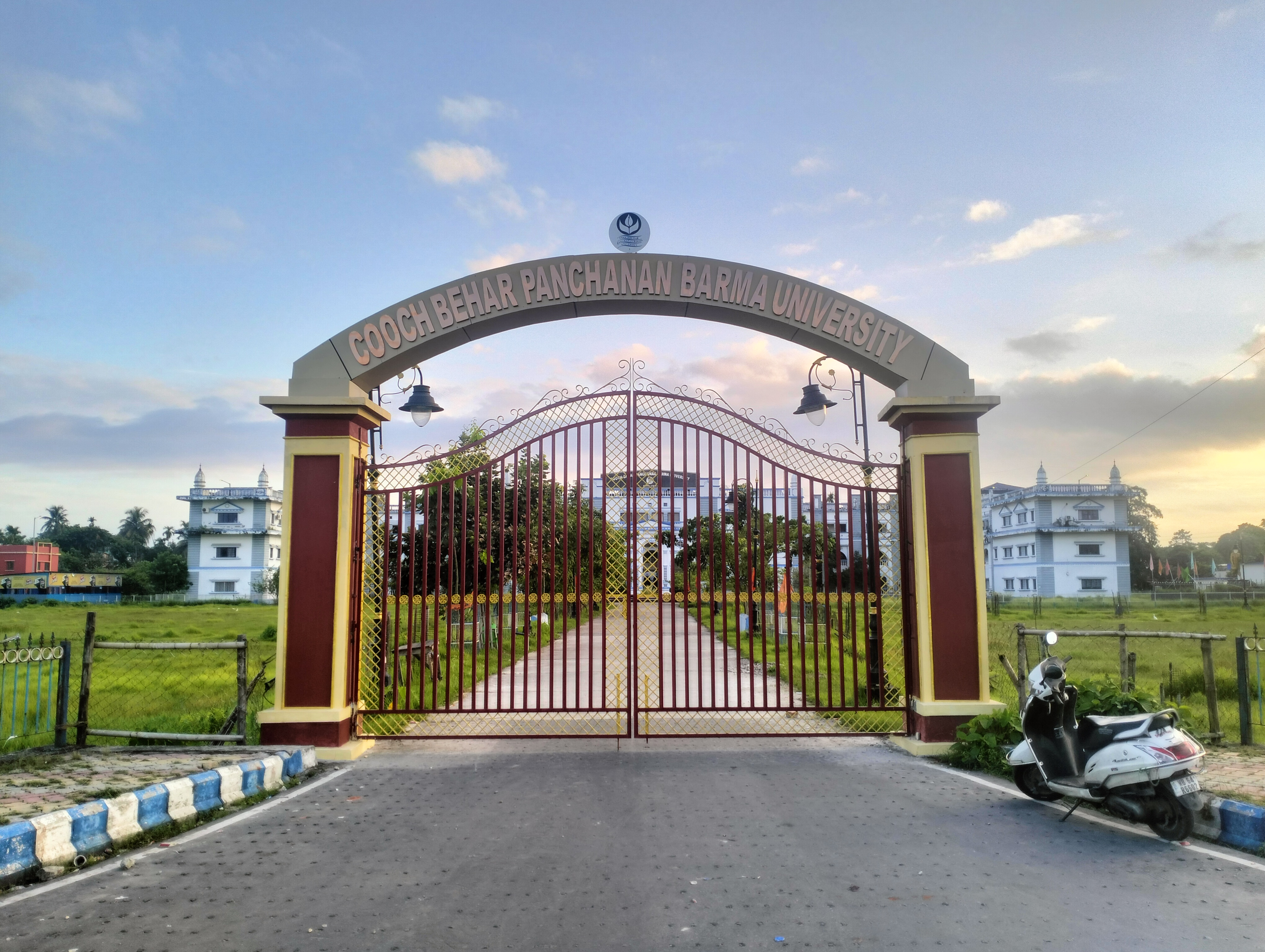
- Main entrance gate of the university.
- Type: Public State University
- Established: 2012 (14 years ago)
- Accreditation: NAAC
- Academic affiliations: UGC; AIU; BCI
- Budget: ₹10.7373 crore (US$1.1 million) (2021–22 est.)
- Chancellor: Governor of West Bengal
- Vice-Chancellor: Sanchari Roy Mukherjee
- Location: Cooch Behar, West Bengal, India; 26°19′18″N 89°28′11″E
- Campus: Rural
- Website: cbpbu.ac.in

Cooch Behar Panchanan Barma University (CBPBU or PBU) is a public state university in Cooch Behar, West Bengal, India. The university was named after the 19th-century Rajbangshi leader and social reformist Panchanan Barma.

== History ==
The Government of West Bengal established Cooch Behar Panchanan Barma University under the West Bengal Act XXI of 2012 and The Cooch Behar Panchanan Barma University Act 2012.

The first statutes of the university were approved by the chancellor of the university, the Hon'ble Governor of West Bengal, in the first week of January 2015, and subsequently printed. On 8 April 2015, the University Grants Commission, New Delhi, granted it '2(F)' affiliation. The first statutes were gazetted at the end of April 2015, while the first Executive Council meeting was held on 22 May 2015.

The university, which functioned from its camp office at Central Farmers' Hostel, Uttar Banga Krishi Viswavidyalaya, Pundibari, shifted to its permanent campus on Vivekananda Street, near Krishi Bij Khamar, Cooch Behar, on 19 August 2015. Before this, through a July 2015 order from the Department of Higher Education, Government of West Bengal, 15 general-degree colleges, mostly from the district of Cooch Behar, were initially affiliated to the University.

Professor Indrajit Ray, a former teacher of economics of the University of North Bengal, was the first vice-chancellor, while Professor Shubhrangshu Sekhar Chattopadhyay, originally from the Department of Law, University of Calcutta, joined the university as the second vice-chancellor in January 2015. Presently, Prof. Syamal Roy, originally from the Indian Institute of Chemical Biology, is officiating as the first permanently appointed vice-chancellor. Dr. Debkumar Mukhopadhyay is the first registrar of Cooch Behar Panchanan Barma University. Nirupom Bhattacharyya is the (acting) Finance Officer.

Prof (Dr.) Sanchari Roy Mukherjee, Hon'ble Vice chancellor of Cooch Behar Panchanan Barma University during the inaugural session of RTBS 2026.

== Organisation and Administration ==
=== Governance ===
The Vice-chancellor of the Cooch Behar Panchanan Barma University is the chief executive officer of the university.

SL. No.	Name of the Vice-Chancellors	Period	
SL. No.	Name of the Vice-Chancellors	From	To
1	Prof. Indrajit Ray	12.12.2012	11.01.2015
2	Prof. Dr. Shubhrangshu Sekhar Chatterjee	12.01.2015	21.02.2016
3	Prof. Syamal Roy	22.02.2016	08.06.2017
4	Dr. Debkumar Mukhopadhyay	09.06.2017	31.05.2023
5	Prof. Nikhil Chandra Ray	04.10.2023	02.01.2025
6	Prof. Sanchari Roy Mukherjee	23.02.2026	Till Now

Cooch Behar Panchanan Barma University Overview of the area covered.

=== Faculties and Departments ===
The Cooch Behar Panchanan Barma University has 19 departments organized into two faculty councils.

- Faculty of Science

This faculty consists of the departments of Mathematics, Physics, Chemistry, Botany, Geography and Zoology.

- Faculty of Arts & Commerce

This faculty consists of the departments of Bengali, English, Hindi, Sanskrit, History, Political Science, Philosophy, Library and Information Science, Journalism & Mass Communication, Economics, Education, Law, and Commerce.

Cooch Behar Panchanan Barma University also offers Certificate Course in Rajbongshi language, and Spanish language.

=== Affiliations ===
Cooch Behar Panchanan Barma University is an affiliating university and has jurisdiction over the colleges of the Cooch Behar district. A total of 15 colleges from Cooch Behar district are affiliated with the university.

== Academics ==
- Bengali
- English
- Sanskrit
- Hindi
- Physics
- Chemistry
- Mathematics
- Computer Science
- Botany
- Zoology
- Geography
- History
- Political Science
- Library and information science
- Mass communication
- Education
- Philosophy
- Commerce
- Economics
- Law
- Human Rights and Duties Education

=== Accreditations ===
The University Grants Commission (U.G.C.) accorded recognition to the university in terms of Section 12B of the U.G.C. Act.
