= Nigamnagar =

- Village
- Location in West Bengal, India
- Coordinates: 26°07′10″N 89°30′50″E
- Country: India
- State: West Bengal
- District: Cooch Behar
- Elevation: 39 m (128 ft)

Population (2011)
  - Total: 8,303

Languages
  - Official: Bengali, English
- Time zone: UTC+5:30 (IST)
- PIN: 736169
- Telephone code: 03581
- Lok Sabha constituency: Cooch Behar (SC)
- Vidhan Sabha constituency: Dinhata, Sitai (SC)
- Website: coochbehar.nic.in

Nigamnagar is a village of Dinhata subdivision, Cooch Behar District, in the state of West Bengal, India.Nigamnagar is popular for the temple of thakur Nigamananda Paramahansha.It is situated beside baniadaha river.

== Geography ==
Nigamnagar has an average elevation of 39 metres (128 feet).

== Demographics ==
As of 2011 India census, Nigamnagar had a population of 8,303. Males constitute 51% of the population and females 49%. Nigamnagar has an average literacy rate of 80%, higher than the national average of 59.5%: male literacy is 84% and, female literacy is 75%. In Nigamnagar, 9% of the population is under 6 years of age.

== Climate ==
Nigamnagar has three distinct seasons: summer, winter and monsoon. In summer the temperature reaches 35 degree Celsius. Winters are generally chilled and cool when temperature goes down to 5 to 6 degree Celsius. During the monsoons (between June and September), the city is lashed by moderate to heavy rains. The city has several faults or uplands nearby and is the reason for frequent earthquakes. The climate is suitable for growing rice and the surrounding regions have many tea gardens.

Climate data for Nigamnagar
Month	Jan	Feb	Mar	Apr	May	Jun	Jul	Aug	Sep	Oct	Nov	Dec	Year
Mean daily maximum °C (°F)	23 (73)	25 (77)	28 (82)	31 (88)	33 (91)	35 (95)	34 (93)	31 (88)	28 (82)	26 (79)	24 (75)	23 (73)	28 (83)
Mean daily minimum °C (°F)	5 (41)	10 (50)	13 (55)	21 (70)	24 (75)	25 (77)	26 (79)	25 (77)	23 (73)	16 (61)	10 (50)	7 (45)	17 (63)
Average precipitation mm (inches)	8 (0.3)	18 (0.7)	33 (1.3)	94 (3.7)	300 (11.8)	658 (25.9)	818 (32.2)	643 (25.3)	538 (21.2)	142 (5.6)	13 (0.5)	7 (0.3)	3,266 (128.6)
Source: Dinhata Weather
