= Atialdanga =

- Village
- Location in West Bengal, India Atialdanga (India)
- Coordinates: 26°04′05.58″N 89°37′51.51″E
- Country: India
- State: West Bengal
- District: Cooch Behar
- Sub-division: Dinhata
- Block: Dinhata II

Population (2011)
  - Total: 1,982

Languages
  - Official: Bengali, English
- Time zone: UTC+5:30 (IST)
- PIN: 736168

Atialdanga is a village in Cooch Behar district.

Atialdanga is a village in the Coochbehar district of West Bengal, India, located about 8 kilometers from Bamanhat Railway Station. As of the 2011 Census, it has a population of 1,982, with a literacy rate of 61.05%. The village is served by two primary schools and is economically supported by the Bagnirhat Market. Predominantly inhabited by Muslims and Hindus, the community primarily speaks Bangla. Atialdanga embodies a rich cultural heritage and a close-knit rural lifestyle.
