= Ajay Ray =

Indian politician in West Bengal

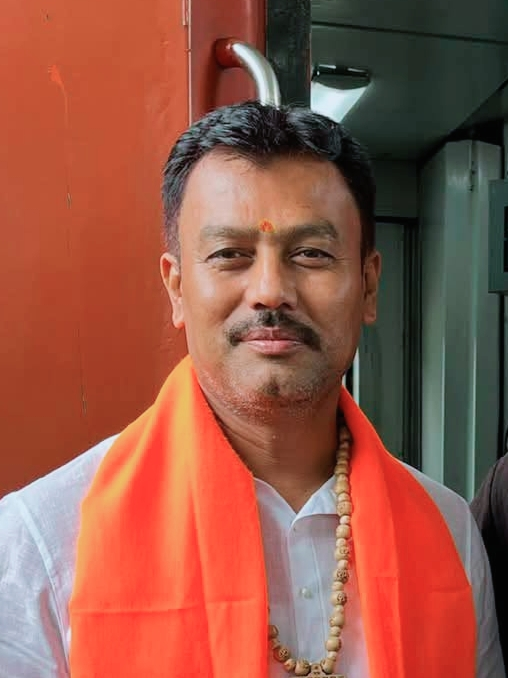
- Ray in 2026

Member of the West Bengal Legislative Assembly
- Incumbent
- Assumed office 4 May 2026
- Preceded by: Udayan Guha
- Constituency: Dinhata

Personal details
- Born: Dinhata, Cooch Behar, West Bengal 736135
- Party: Bharatiya Janata Party
- Spouse: Bithika Roy
- Children: Debjyoti Roy; Harshita Roy
- Parent(s): Ramkrishna Ray; Sabita Ray
- Occupation: Business; Social Worker
- Profession: Politician

Ajay Ray (Bengali: অজয় রায়) is a politician from Cooch Behar district of West Bengal. He is a member of West Bengal Legislative Assembly, from Dinhata Assembly constituency. He is a member of Bharatiya Janata Party.

== Early life and education ==
Ray is from Cooch Behar district of West Bengal. His qualification is Madhyamik Passed from Dinata Soni Debi Jain High School (H.S) under West Bengal Board of Secondary Education in the year 1993.

== Political career ==
He is a member of West Bengal Legislative Assembly, from Dinhata Assembly constituency.

=== Electoral performance ===
West Bengal Legislative Assembly
Year	Constituency	Party	Votes	%	Opponent	Party	Votes	%	Margin	Result
2026	Dinhata	BJP	1,38,255	51.60	Udayan Guha	AITC	120,808	45.09	17,447	Won

== See also ==
- 2026 West Bengal Legislative Assembly election
- List of chief ministers of West Bengal
- West Bengal Legislative Assembly
