= Badalgir =

Coordinates: 26°3′45.0″N 89°37′18.5″E

- Village
- Location in West Bengal, India Badalgir (India)
- Country: India
- State: West Bengal
- District: Cooch Behar
- Sub-division: Dinhata
- Block: Dinhata II

Population (2011)
  - Total: 1,732

Languages
  - Official: Bengali, English
- Time zone: UTC+5:30 (IST)
- PIN: 736168

Badalgir is a village in Cooch Behar district.
