= Kalmati, Cooch Behar =

Kalmati
- Village
- Location in West Bengal, India Kalmati (India)
- Country: India
- State: West Bengal
- District: Cooch Behar
- Sub-division: Dinhata
- Block: Dinhata II

Population (2011)
  - Total: 9,882

Languages
  - Official: Bengali, English
- Time zone: UTC+5:30 (IST)
- PIN: 736176

Kalmati (also spelled as Kalamati) is a village in Cooch Behar district under Dinhata II block in West Bengal, India.
