= Sitai =

- Community development block
- Interactive map of Sitai
- Coordinates: 26.060556°N 89.318333°E
- Country: India
- State: West Bengal
- District: Cooch Behar

Government
  - Type: Representative democracy

Area
  - Total: 160.82 km^{2} (62.09 sq mi)

Population (2011)
  - Total: 110,333
  - Density: 686.07/km^{2} (1,776.9/sq mi)

Languages
  - Official: Bengali, English
- Time zone: UTC+5:30 (IST)
- Lok Sabha constituency: Cooch Behar
- Vidhan Sabha constituency: Sitai
- Website: coochbehar.gov.in

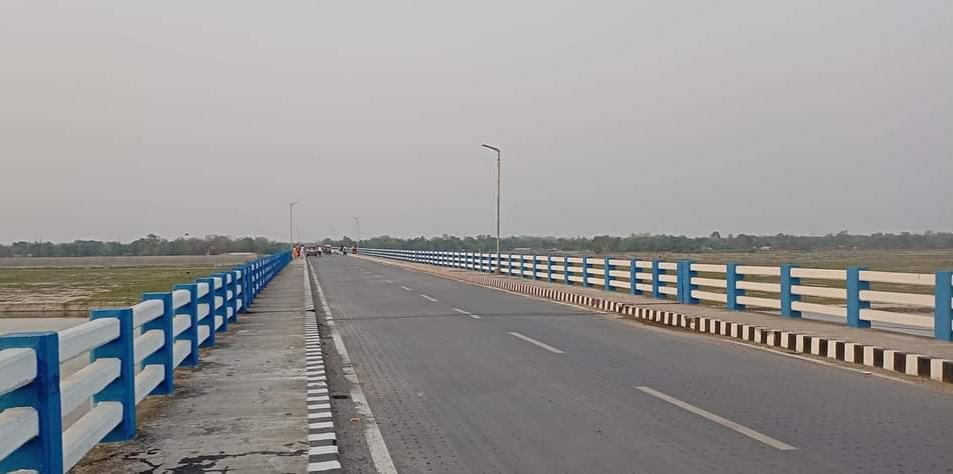
Kamteswari Bridge connecting Sitai with Dinhata.

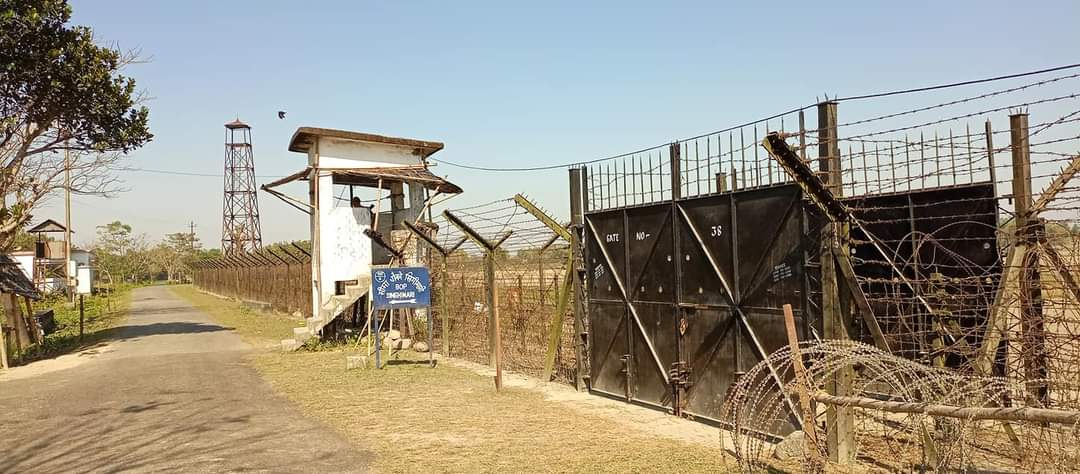
Indo-Bangladesh Border at Sitai .

Sitai is a community development block (CD block) that forms an administrative division in the Dinhata subdivision of the Cooch Behar district in the Indian state of West Bengal.

== Geography ==
Sitai is located at 26°03′38″N 89°19′06″E.

Topographically Cooch Behar district is generally plain land which is low and marshy at some places. “Considering the nature of general surface configuration, relief and drainage pattern, distribution of different types of soil, climatic condition, the formation of geology and forest tracts, the district Koch Bihar falls under Barind Tract. The physiology of this area consists of alluvial soil, generally blackish brown in colour and composed of sand, clay and silt. The soils are loose and sandy throughout the district.” The Himalayan formations in the north end beyond the boundaries of this district. There are no hills/ mountains here. It has a large network of rivers flowing from north-west to south and south-east. The Teesta flows through Mekhliganj CD block before entering Bangladesh. The Jaldhaka and its connected river-streams form a large catchment area in the district. It virtually divides the district into two unequal parts and meets the Brahmaputra in Bangladesh. The Himalayan rivers flowing through Cooch Behar district change courses from time to time. In 1876, W.W. Hunter mentioned the Dharla and the Torsha as the same stream with two names. However, since the advent of the 20th century, these are two different streams meeting the Brahmaputra in Bangladesh.

The hill-streams of Cooch Behar carry debris and silt from the Himalayas and are shallow. During the monsoons the speed of flow of the rivers almost doubles and the rivers overflow the banks causing floods and devastation. The Singimari and Giridhari/ Girdari are the major rivers causing floods in the Sitai CD block.

The Sitai CD block is bounded by the Sitalkuchi and Cooch Behar I CD blocks on the north, the Dinhata I CD block on the east, the Lalmonirhat Sadar Upazila in Lalmonirhat District of Bangladesh on the south and the Aditmari Upazila of Lalmonirhat District of Bangladesh on the west.

The Sitai CD block has an area of 160.82 km^{2}. It has 1 panchayat samity, 5 gram panchayats, 81 gram sansads (village councils), 53 mouzas and 53 inhabited villages. Sitai police station serves this block. Headquarters of this CD block is at Sitai.

Gram panchayats of Sitai block/ panchayat samiti are: Adabari Ghat, Brahmattar Chhatra, Chamta, Sitai I and Sitai II.

Community development blocks in Cooch Behar district

== Demographics ==
=== Population ===
According to the 2011 Census of India, the Sitai CD block had a total population of 110,333, all of which were rural. There were 56,016 (51%) males and 54,317 (49%) females. There were 15,424 persons in the age range of 0 to 6 years. The Scheduled Castes numbered 72,924 (66.09%) and the Scheduled Tribes numbered 215 (0.19%).

According to the 2001 census, Sitai block had a total population of 96,335, out of which 49,196 were males and 47,139 were females. Sitai block registered a population growth of 11.76 per cent during the 1991-2001 decade.

Large villages (with 4,000+ population) in the Sitai CD block are (2011 census figures in brackets): Brahmottra Chatra (5,863), Konachatra (4,369), Kesaribari (6,507), Dhumerkhata (5,992), Bharali (7,062), Sitai (4,949) and Chamta (9,469).

Other villages in the Sitai CD block include (2011 census figures in brackets): Bara Adabari (1571).

=== Literacy ===
According to the 2011 census, the total number of literate persons in the Sitai CD block was 59,595 (62.79% of the population over 6 years) out of which males numbered 33,323 (69.17% of the male population over 6 years) and females numbered 26,272 (56.21% of the female population over 6 years). The gender disparity (the difference between female and male literacy rates) was 12.96%.

See also – List of West Bengal districts ranked by literacy rate

Literacy in CD blocks of
Cooch Behar district
Cooch Behar Sadar subdivision
Cooch Behar I – 76.56%
Cooch Behar II – 81.39%
Dinhata subdivision
Dinhata I – 73.23%
Dinhata II – 72.33%
Sitai – 62.79%
Mathabhanga subdivision
Sitalkuchi – 70.34%
Mathabhanga I – 71.51%
Mathabhanga II – 72.68%
Tufanganj subdivision
Tufanganj I – 73.69%
Tufanganj II – 75.75%
Mekhliganj subdivision
Mekhliganj – 69.34%
Haldibari – 69.22%
2011 Census: CD Block Wise

Primary Census Abstract Data

=== Language and religion ===
Religion in Sitai CD block (2011)
| Hinduism | 70.62% |
| Islam | 29.26% |
| Other or not stated | 0.12% |

In the 2011 Census of India, Hindus numbered 77,918 and formed 70.62% of the population of Sitai CD block. Muslims numbered 32,282 and formed 29.26% of the population. Christians numbered 62 and formed 0.06% of the population. Others numbered 71 and formed 0.06% of the population.

Bengali is the predominant language, spoken by 99.71% of the population.

== Rural poverty ==
Based on a study of the per capita consumption in rural and urban areas, using central sample data of NSS 55th Round 1999-2000, Cooch Behar district had a rural poverty ratio of 25.62%.

According to a World Bank report, as of 2012, 20-26% of the population of Cooch Behar, Birbhum, Nadia and Hooghly districts were below poverty line, marginally higher than the level of poverty in West Bengal, which had an average 20% of the population below poverty line.

== Economy ==
=== Livelihood ===
Livelihood
in Sitai CD block
1. Cultivators (42.0%)
2. Agricultural labourers (44.9%)
3. Household industries (1.67%)
4. Other Workers (11.4%)

In the Sitai CD block in 2011, among the class of total workers, cultivators numbered 21,141 and formed 41.96%, agricultural labourers numbered 22,635 and formed 44.92%, household industry workers numbered 843 and formed 1.67% and other workers numbered 5,768 and formed 11.45%. Total workers numbered 50,387 and formed 45.67% of the total population, and non-workers numbered 59,946 and formed 54.33% of the population.

Note: In the census records a person is considered a cultivator, if the person is engaged in cultivation/ supervision of land owned by self/government/institution. When a person who works on another person's land for wages in cash or kind or share, is regarded as an agricultural labourer. Household industry is defined as an industry conducted by one or more members of the family within the household or village, and one that does not qualify for registration as a factory under the Factories Act. Other workers are persons engaged in some economic activity other than cultivators, agricultural labourers and household workers. It includes factory, mining, plantation, transport and office workers, those engaged in business and commerce, teachers, entertainment artistes and so on.

=== Infrastructure ===
There are 53 inhabited villages in the Sitai CD block, as per the District Census Handbook, Cooch Behar, 2011. All 53 villages have electricity and drinking water supply. 15 villages (28.30%) have post offices. 50 villages (94.34%) have telephones (including landlines, public call offices and mobile phones). 30 villages (56.60%) have pucca (paved) approach roads and 10 villages (18.87%) have transport communication (includes bus service, rail facility and navigable waterways). 5 villages (9.43%) have agricultural credit societies and 4 villages (7.55%) have banks.

=== Agriculture ===
Agriculture is the primary mode of living in the district. The entire Cooch Behar district has fertile soil and around half of the cultivated land in the district is cropped twice or more. Paddy (rice) and jute are the largest producing crops, followed by potatoes, vegetables and pulses. There are 23 tea gardens on glided slopes. There are some coconut, areca nut and betel leaf plantations. 77.6% of the land holdings are marginal.

In 2012-13, there were 3 fertiliser depots, 1 seed store and 20 fair price shops in the Sitai CD block.

In 2012–13, the Sitai CD block produced 21,907 tonnes of Aman paddy, the main winter crop, from 10,581 hectares, 12,115 tonnes of Boro paddy (spring crop) from 3,911 hectares, 976 tonnes of Aus paddy (summer crop) from 817 hectares, 120 tonnes of wheat from 65 hectares, 1,266 tonnes of maize from 520 hectares, 35,715 tonnes of jute from 2,830 hectares and 13,264 tonnes of potatoes from 623 hectares. It also produced pulses and oilseeds.

In 2012-13, the total area irrigated in the Sitai CD block was 2,724 hectares, out of which 50 hectares were irrigated by private canal water, 120 hectares by tank water, 362 hectares by river lift irrigation, 80 hectares by deep tube wells, 1,722 hectares by shallow tube wells, 110 hectares by open dug wells, 280 hectares by other means.

=== Pisciculture ===
Being a river-bound district, pisciculture is an important economic activity in the Cooch Behar district. Almost all the rivers originating in the Himalayas have a lot of fish. The net area under effective pisciculture in 2010-11 in the Sitai CD block was 175.50 hectares. 9,595persons were engaged in the profession and approximate annual production was 8,142 quintals.

=== Banking ===
In 2012-13, Sitai CD block had offices of 3 commercial banks and 1 gramin bank.

== Transport ==
Sitai CD block has 4 ferry services and 2 originating/ terminating bus routes. The nearest railway station at Dinhata is 27 kilometres (17 mi) from block headquarters & one have to take a car to reach there crossing the Jaldhaka River . The Mathabhanga - Sitalkuchi - Sitai Railway line is a long pending demand of the local people since 2000. The 45 kilometres (28 mi) proposed railway line if completed will give Sitai access to Kolkata is a easier way than the current scenarios

== Education ==
In 2012-13, Sitai CD block had 69 primary schools with 13,401 students, 7 middle schools with 2,843 students, 4 high schools with 4,900 students and 4 higher secondary schools with 5,928 students. Sitai CD block had 255 institutions for special and non-formal education with 7,405 students.

See also – Education in India

According to the 2011 census, in the Sitai CD block, among the 53 inhabited villages, 4 villages did not have schools, 12 villages had two or more primary schools, 14 villages had at least 1 primary and 1 middle school and 8 villages had at least 1 middle and 1 secondary school.

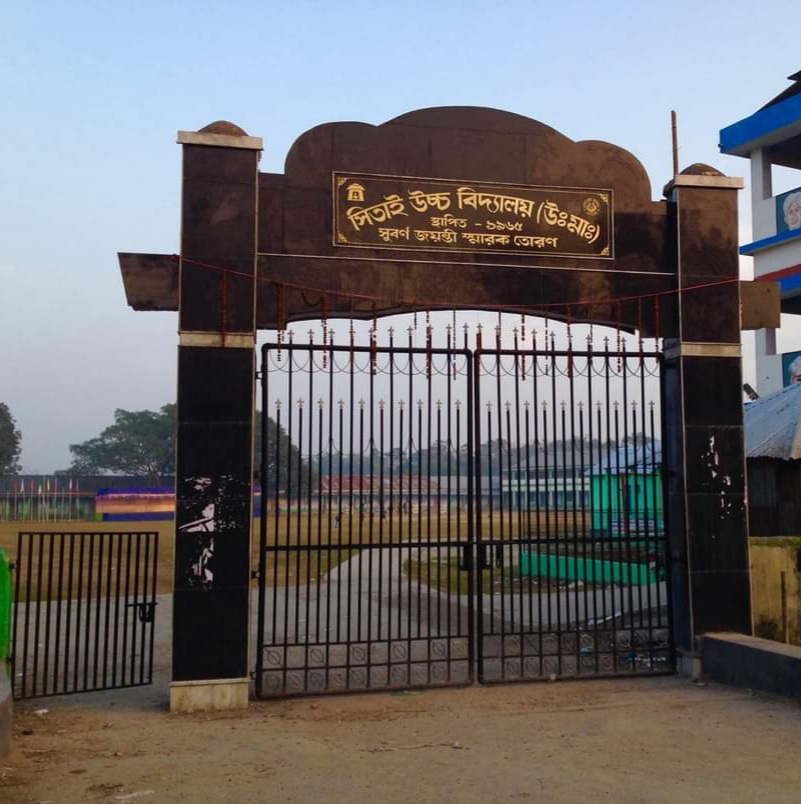
The main entrance Gate of Sitai High School renovated in 2015 on the occasion of the Golden Jubilee Celebration.

Sitai High School, founded in 1965, plays an iconic role in providing the education to the learners of the block.

== Healthcare ==
In 2013, Sitai CD block had 1 block primary health centre and 2 primary health centres with total 38 beds and 4 doctors (excluding private bodies). It had 17 family welfare subcentres. 5,995 patients were treated indoor and 42,103 patients were treated outdoor in the hospitals, health centres and subcentres of the CD block.

Sitai Rural Hospital, with 30 beds at Sitaihati, is the major government medical facility in the Sitai CD block. There are primary health centres at Nakarjan (with 4 beds) and Adabari (PO Kisamat Adabari) (with 4 beds).
