= Nisith Pramanik =

Indian politician

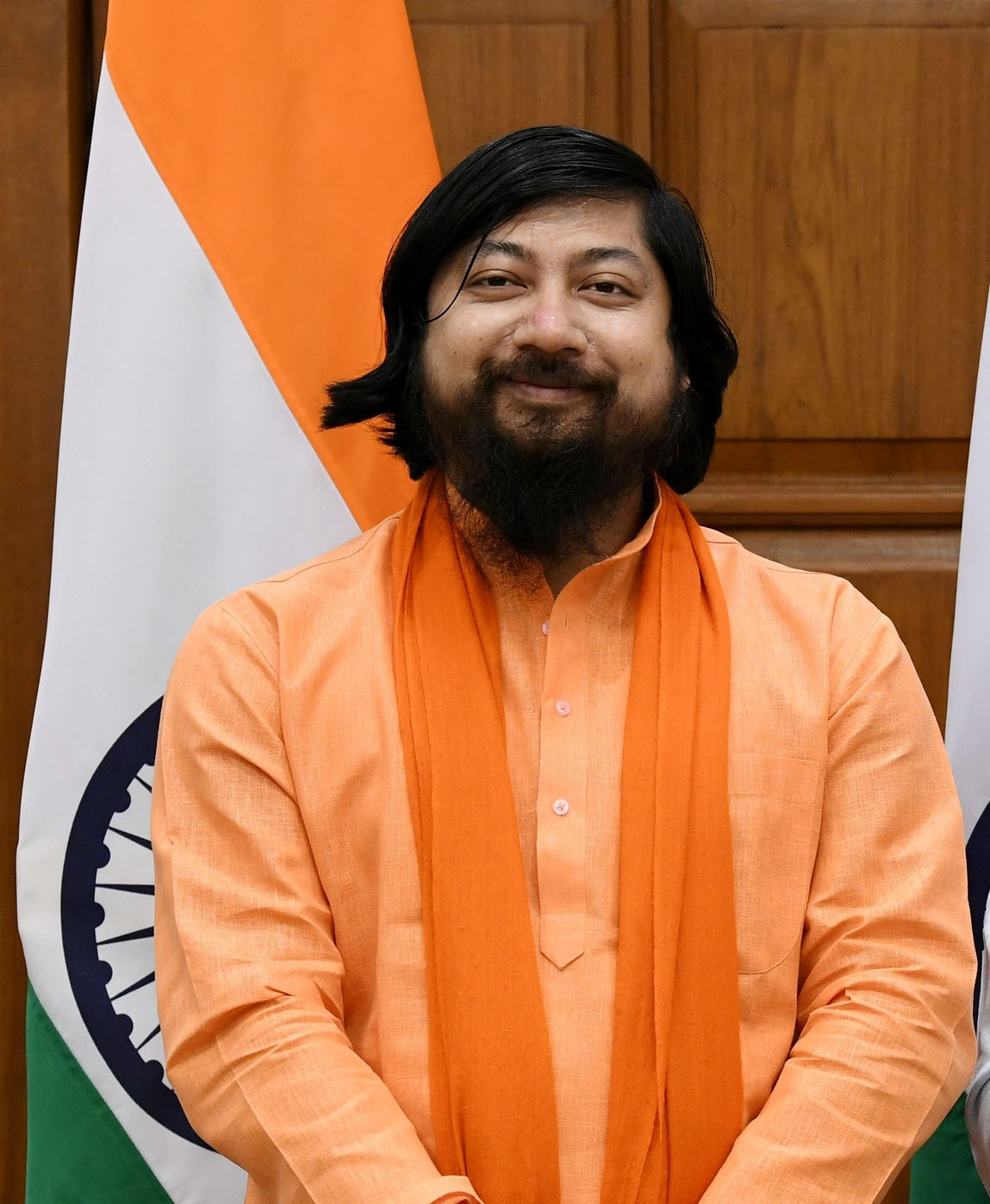
- Pramanik in 2021

Cabinet Minister, Government of West Bengal
- Incumbent
- Assumed office 9 May 2026
- Governor: R. N. Ravi
- Chief Minister: Suvendu Adhikari
- Department: North Bengal Development, Water Resources Investigation and Development
- Preceded by: Udayan Guha
- In office 9 May 2026 – 9 June 2026
- Department: Youth Affairs and Sports
- Preceded by: Aroop Biswas
- Succeeded by: Indranil Khan

Minister of State for Home Affairs, Government of India
- In office 7 July 2021 – 11 June 2024
- Prime Minister: Narendra Modi
- Cabinet Minister: Amit Shah
- Preceded by: G. Kishan Reddy
- Succeeded by: Bandi Sanjay Kumar

Union Minister of State for Youth Affairs and Sports, Government of India
- In office 7 July 2021 – 11 June 2024
- Prime Minister: Narendra Modi
- Minister: Anurag Thakur
- Preceded by: Kiren Rijiju (as MOS (I/C))
- Succeeded by: Raksha Khadse

Member of West Bengal Legislative Assembly
- Incumbent
- Assumed office 4 May 2026
- Preceded by: Sushil Barman
- Constituency: Mathabhanga
- In office 2 May 2021 – 12 May 2021
- Preceded by: Udayan Guha
- Succeeded by: Udayan Guha
- Constituency: Dinhata

Member of Parliament, Lok Sabha
- In office 23 May 2019 – 4 June 2024
- Preceded by: Parthapratim Roy
- Succeeded by: Jagadish Chandra Barma Basunia
- Constituency: Cooch Behar

Personal details
- Born: 17 January 1986 (age 40) Dinhata, Cooch Behar, India
- Party: Bharatiya Janata Party (2019–present)
- Other political affiliations: All India Trinamool Congress (until February 2019)
- Spouse: Priyanka Pramanik
- Children: 2
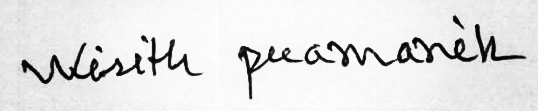
- Signature

Nisith Pramanik (born 17 January 1986) is an Indian politician from West Bengal who has served as the Union Minister of State, Ministry of Home Affairs and Union Minister of State, Ministry of Youth Affairs and Sports from 2021 to 2024 and a speaker of the Lok Sabha represented Cooch Behar, West Bengal from 2021 to 2024 as a member of the Bharatiya Janata Party. He was also a member of the West Bengal Legislative Assembly in 2021 from Dinhata Assembly constituency. He was a member of the Trinamool Congress until 2019.

== Early life and education ==
Nisith Pramanik was born on 17 January 1986 in Dinhata, located in Cooch Behar district of West Bengal state, India. His parents' ancestral home was in Harinathpur of Palashbari Upazila under Gaibandha district in Bangladesh. In 1968, his family migrated from Bangladesh and settled permanently in Dinhata, Cooch Behar. He passed class 10th from Bhetaguri Lal Bahadur Sastri Vidyapith Dinhata under the State Board in 2001. He was an assistant teacher at a primary school. He is married to Priyanka Pramanik, with whom he has two sons.

== Political career ==
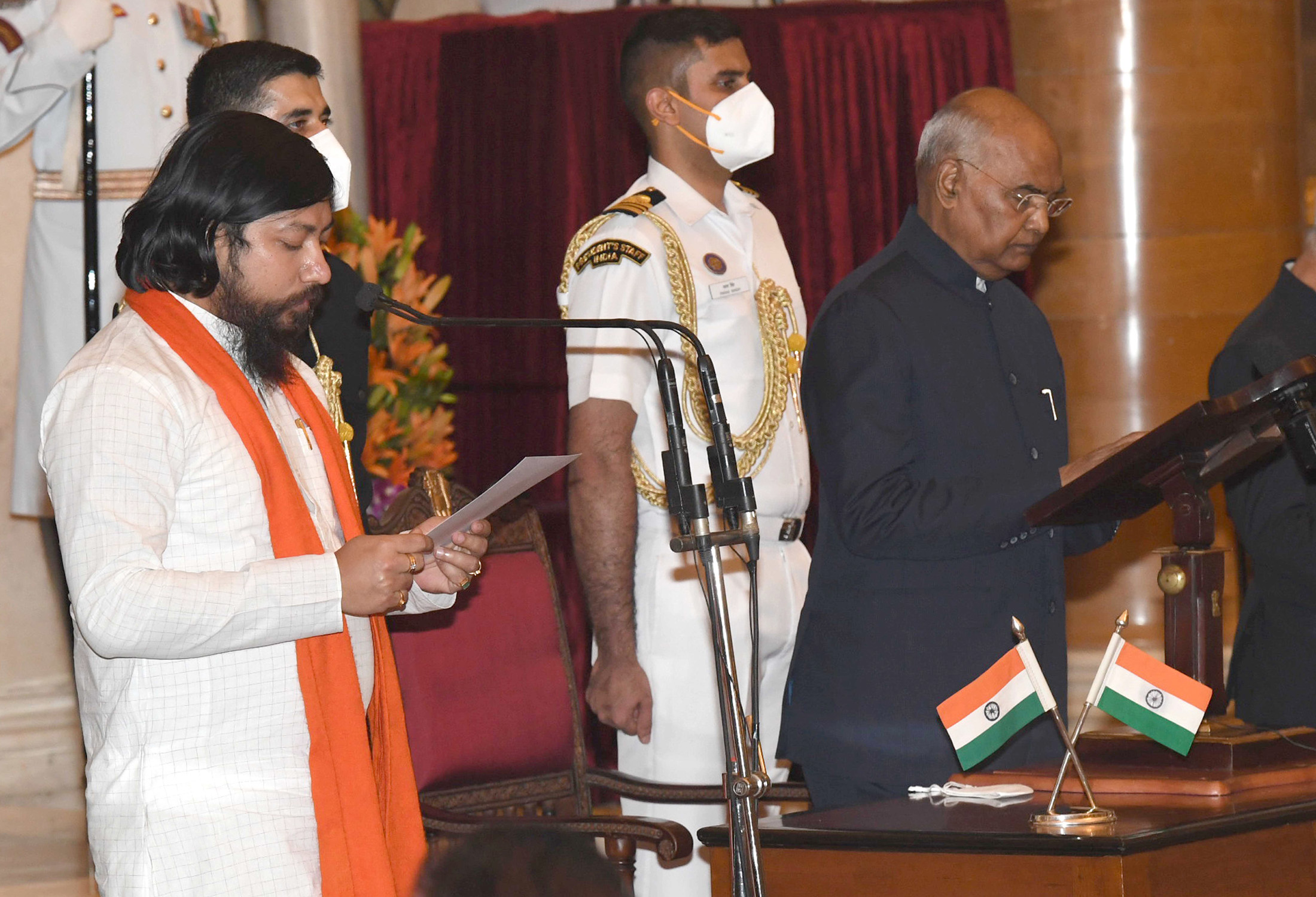
President Shri Ram Nath Kovind administering the oath as Minister of State to Shri Nisith Pramanik, at a Swearing-in Ceremony at Rashtrapati Bhavan in New Delhi on July 7, 2021.

He was a member of All India Trinamool Congress (AITC) before joining the BJP in March 2019. In July 2021, he became the Minister of Home Affairs and Minister of State, Ministry of Youth Affairs and Sports in the Second Modi ministry after the Cabinet reshuffle. As of 2021, at the age of 35 he became the youngest minister in the Union Cabinet. Nisith Pramanik has been entrusted with the North Bengal Development as well as Sports and Youth Welfare portfolios in the newly formed Bengal government led by Suvendu Adhikari. A key BJP leader from North Bengal and former Union minister, Pramanik has played a significant role in strengthening the party's organisational base across the region. His appointment is seen as strategically important as the BJP looks to consolidate its influence in North Bengal while also focusing on youth engagement, sports infrastructure, and regional development initiatives.

== Electoral performance ==
=== Lok Sabha ===
Year	Constituency	Party	Votes	in %	Opponent	Party	Votes	in %	Margin	Margin in %	Results
2019	Cooch Behar	BJP	7,31,594	47.98	Paresh Chandra Adhikary	AITC	6,77,363	44.43	54,231	3.55	Won
2024	Cooch Behar	BJP	7,49,125	46.16	Jagadish Chandra Barma Basunia	AITC	7,88,375	48.57	-39,250	-2.41	Lost

=== Legislative Assembly ===
Year	Constituency	Party	Votes	in %	Opponent	Party	Votes	in %	Margin	Margin in %	Results
2021	Dinhata	BJP	1,16,035	47.60	Udayan Guha	AITC	1,15,978	47.58	57	0.02	Won
2026	MathaBhanga	BJP	1,43,340	59.27	Sablu Barman	AITC	86,250	35.56	57,090	23.31	Won

== Allegations ==
In July 2021, his nationality created debate in the Indian political circle after Congress Rajya Sabha MP Ripun Bora wrote a letter to the Prime Minister alleging Pramanik was a Bangladeshi national to the Prime Minister and requested an investigation into his nationality. Leader of the Opposition in Rajya Sabha, Mallikarjun Kharge, also questioned his citizenship, while TMC Rajya Sabha MP Sukhendu Sekhar Roy also alleged he is a Bangladeshi, citing his Wikipedia page as a reference. The Leader of the Rajya Sabha, BJP MP Piyush Goyal, however, called the allegations baseless.
