= Sahebganj, Cooch Behar =

Sahebganj
- Village
- Location in West Bengal, India Sahebganj (India)
- Coordinates: 26.11407°N 89.58438°E
- Country: India
- State: West Bengal
- District: Cooch Behar

Population (2011)
  - Total: 6,304
- Time zone: UTC+5:30 (IST)
- PIN: 736176
- Telephone/STD code: 03581
- Vehicle registration: WB
- Lok Sabha constituency: Cooch Behar
- Vidhan Sabha constituency: Dinhata
- Website: coochbehar.gov.in

Sahebganj is a village in the Dinhata II CD block in the Dinhata subdivision of the Cooch Behar district in the state of West Bengal, India.

== Geography ==
Places in the Tufanganj and Dinhata subdivisions (except Sitai CD block) in Cooch Behar district
CT: census town, M: municipal town, R: rural/ urban centre, H: historical/ religious centre
Owing to space constraints in the small map, the actual locations in a larger map may vary slightly

=== Location ===
Sahebganj is located at 26.11407°N 89.58438°E.

=== Area overview ===
The map alongside shows the eastern part of the district. In Tufanganj subdivision 6.97% of the population lives in the urban areas and 93.02% lives in the rural areas. In Dinhata subdivision 5.98% of the population lives in the urban areas and 94.02% lives in the urban areas. The entire district forms the flat alluvial flood plains of mighty rivers.

Note: The map alongside presents some of the notable locations in the subdivisions. All places marked in the map are linked in the larger full screen map.

== Civic administration ==
=== Police station ===
There is a police station at Sahebganj.

=== CD block HQ ===
The headquarters of the Dinhata II CD block are located at Sahebganj.

== Demographics ==
As per the 2011 Census of India, Sahebganj had a total population of 6,304. There were 3,279 (52%) males and 3,025 (48%) females. There were 698 persons in the age range of 0 to 6 years. The total number of literate people in Sahebganj was 4,338 (77.38% of the population over 6 years).
