= Gobra Chhara Nayarhat =

Nayarhat Gram Panchayet
- Village
- Gobrachhara Nayarhat Gram Panchayet
- Country: India
- State: West Bengal
- District: Cooch Behar
- Community development block: Dinhata II

Government
  - Prodhan: Aswini KR Roy
- Time zone: UTC+5:30 (IST)
- Postal code: 736135
- Area code: 03581
- Vehicle registration: WB 64

Gobra Chhara Nayarhat is a GP under Dinhata - II block of Cooch Behar district of West Bengal. There are 23 villages under the GP. There is a Gramin Hospital and several health centres in the GP. Nayarhat High School (H.S.) and Abutara High school (H.S.) are the two higher secondary schools situated in the GP.

The prodhan of the GP is Mr. Aswini Kumar Roy of village KARALA (KISHANGANJ).
