= Dinhata College =

College in Cooch Behar, West Bengal, India

Coordinates: 26.145918°N 89.464271°E

- দিনহাটা কলেজ
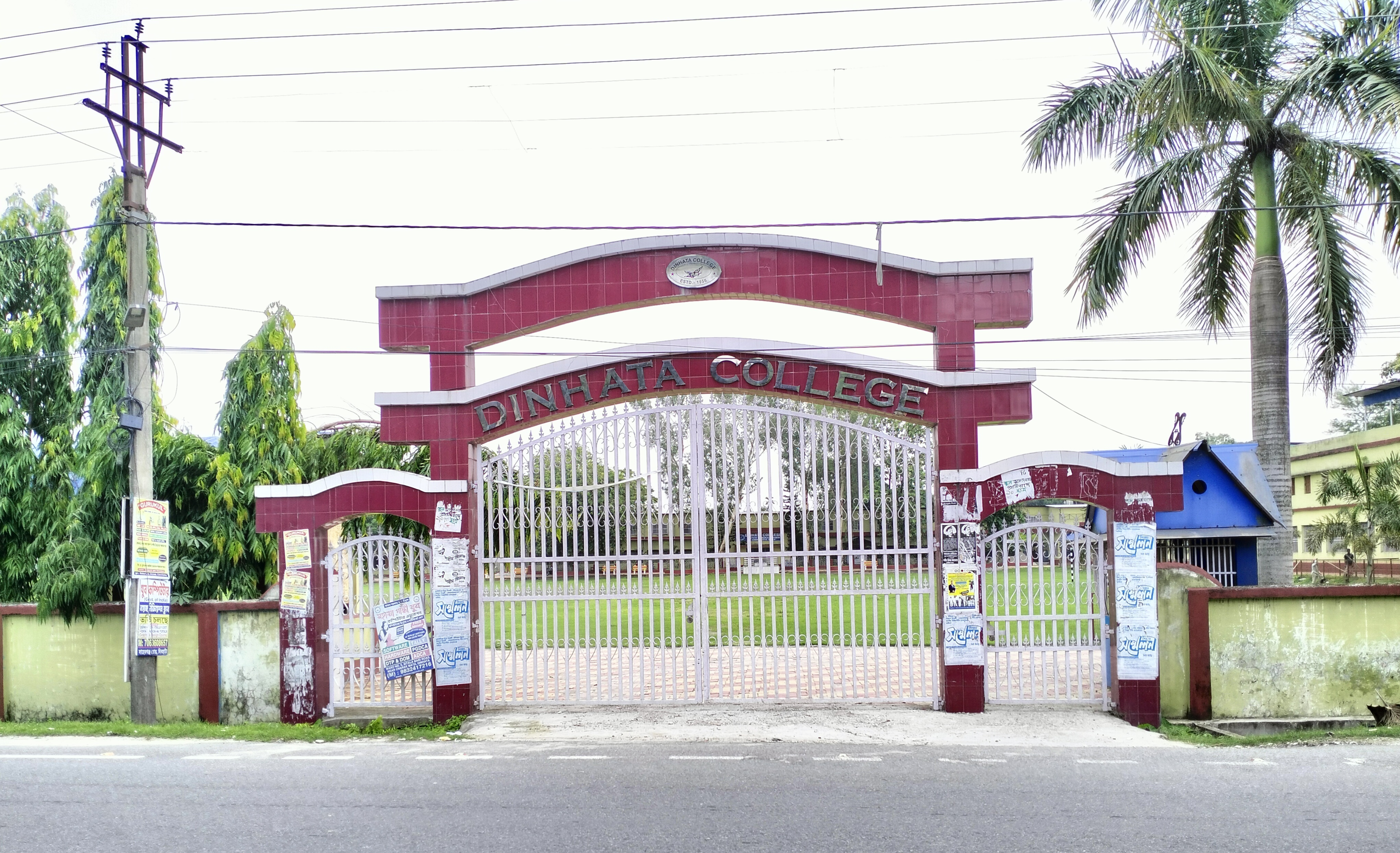
- Main gate of the college.
- Motto: Useful Education for All
- Type: Undergraduate college Public college
- Established: 1956; 70 years ago
- Affiliations: Cooch Behar Panchanan Barma University
- President: Udayan Guha
- Principal: Dr. Abdul Awal
- Administrative staff: 65
- Undergraduates: 5110
- Location: Dinhata, West Bengal, 736135, India
- Campus: Urban
- Language: English, Bengali
- Website: www.dinhatacollege.ac.in

Dinhata College (Bengali: দিনহাটা কলেজ) is a government–aided general degree college established in 1956, is one of the oldest college in Dinhata, West Bengal, India. It offers undergraduate courses in arts, commerce and sciences. The campus is in the Cooch Behar district. It is affiliated to Cooch Behar Panchanan Barma University (formerly affiliated to University of North Bengal).

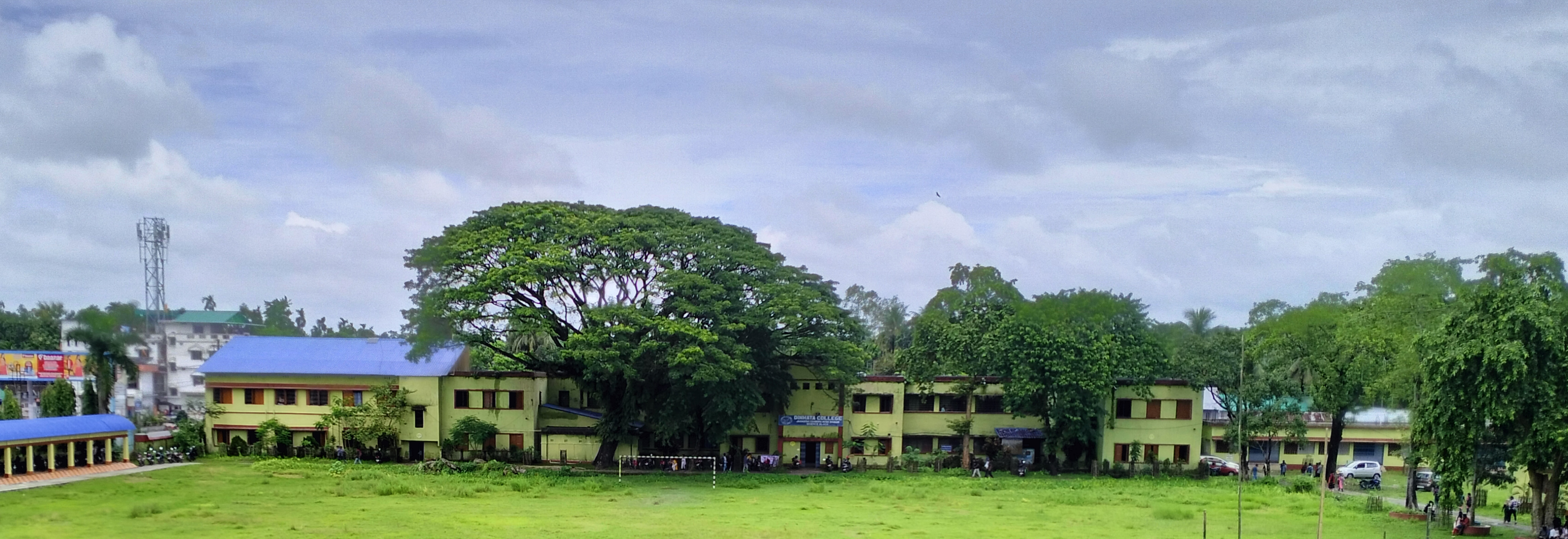
Science Building, Dinhata College

== Accreditation ==
The college is recognized by the University Grants Commission (UGC). And accredited by the National Assessment and Accreditation Council in first cycle.

=== Affiliation ===
University	Start	End
University of Calcutta	1956	1962
University of North Bengal	1962	2015
Cooch Behar Panchanan Barma University	2015	present

== Courses offered ==
Courses offered as per the approval of the University
SL.	Streams	Subjects	Intake
1	Arts	Bengali	729
2	Arts	English	354
3	Arts	History	709
4	Arts	Philosophy	709
5	Arts	Political Science	709
6	Arts	Economics	265
7	Arts	Geography	80
8	Arts	Sanskrit	372
9	Arts	Sociology	372
10	Arts	Physical Education	79
11	Science	Physics	122
12	Science	Chemistry	88
13	Science	Mathematics	140
14	Science	Botany	61
15	Science	Zoology	61
16	Commerce	Accountancy	260

== See also ==
- List of institutions of higher education in West Bengal
- Education in India
- Education in West Bengal
