= Sitai, Cooch Behar =

Sitai
- Village
- Location in West Bengal, India Sitai (India)
- Coordinates: 26.051556°N 89.320333°E
- Country: India
- State: West Bengal
- District: Cooch Behar

Population (2011)
  - Total: 4,949
- Time zone: UTC+5:30 (IST)
- PIN: 736167
- Telephone/STD code: 03581
- Vehicle registration: WB
- Lok Sabha constituency: Cooch Behar
- Vidhan Sabha constituency: Sitai
- Website: coochbehar.gov.in

Sitai is a village and gram panchayat in the Sitai CD block in the Dinhata subdivision of the Cooch Behar district in the state of West Bengal, India.

== Geography ==
Places in the Mathabhanga, Mekhliganj subdivisions and Sitai CD block in Dinhata subdivision of Cooch Behar district
CT: census town, R: rural/ urban centre, M: Municipal town
Owing to space constraints in the small map, the actual locations in a larger map may vary slightly

=== Location ===
Sitai is located at 26.051556°N 89.320333°E.

=== Area overview ===
The map alongside shows the western part of the district. In Dinhata subdivision 5.98% of the population lives in the urban areas and 94.02% lives in the urban areas. In Mekhliganj subdivision 9.91% of the population lives in the urban areas and 90.09% lives in the rural areas. In Mathabhanga subdivision 3.67% of the population, the lowest in the district, lives in the urban areas and 96.35% lives in the rural areas. The entire district forms the flat alluvial flood plains of mighty rivers.

Note: The map alongside presents some of the notable locations in the subdivisions. All places marked in the map are linked in the larger full screen map.

=== Sagardighi bridge ===
The Sagardighi Bridge across the Mansai River has been constructed, linking Sitai and Dinhata.

== Civic administration ==
=== Police station ===
Sitai police station has jurisdiction over Sitai CD block. It covers an area of 156.82 km^{2}.

=== CD block HQ ===
The headquarters of the Sitai CD block are located at Sitai village.

== Demographics ==
As per the 2011 Census of India, Sitai had a total population of 4,949. There were 2,538 (51%) males and 2,411 (49%) females. There were 657 persons in the age range of 0 to 6 years. The total number of literate people in Sitai was 2,468 (57.50% of the population over 6 years).

== Healthcare ==
Sitai Rural Hospital, with 30 beds at Sitaihati, is the major government medical facility in the Sitai CD block.
