= Dinhata Assembly constituency =

Dinhata
- Constituency No. 7 for the West Bengal Legislative Assembly
- Interactive Map Outlining Dinhata Assembly Constituency

Constituency details
- Country: India
- Region: East India
- State: West Bengal
- District: Cooch Behar
- Lok Sabha constituency: Cooch Behar (SC)
- Established: 1951
- Total electors: 278,074
- Reservation: None

Member of Legislative Assembly
- 18th West Bengal Legislative Assembly
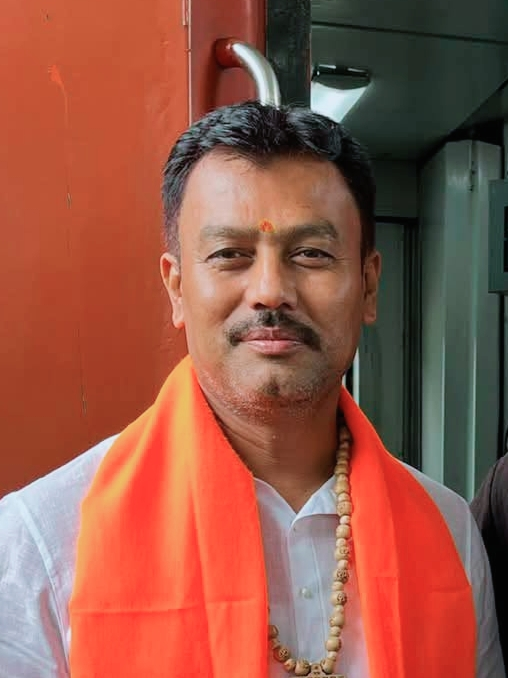
- Incumbent Ajay Ray
- Party: Bharatiya Janata Party
- Elected year: 2026
- Preceded by: Udayan Guha

Most Successful parties from Dinhata assembly
1. All India Forward Bloc (8 times) (42.1%)
2. Indian National Congress (5 times) (26.3%)
3. All India Trinamool Congress (3 times) (15.8%)
4. Bharatiya Janata Party (2 times) (10.5%)
5. Forward Bloc (Socialist) (1 time) (5.26%)

Dinhata Assembly constituency is an assembly constituency in Cooch Behar district in the Indian state of West Bengal.

== Overview ==
As per orders of the Delimitation Commission, No. 7 Dinhata Assembly constituency covers Dinhata municipality, Dinhata II community development block, and Bhetaguri I, Dinhata Gram I, Dinhata Gram II and Putimari I gram panchayats of Dinhata I community development block.

Dinhata Assembly constituency is part of No. 1 Cooch Behar (Lok Sabha constituency) (SC).

== Members of the Legislative Assembly ==
Year	Name	Party
1951	Satish Chandra Roy Singha	Indian National Congress
1957	Bhawani Prasanna Talukdar	Indian National Congress
1962	Kamal Guha	All India Forward Bloc
1967	Kamal Guha	All India Forward Bloc
1969	Animesh Mukharjee	Indian National Congress
1971	Jogesh Chandra Sarkar	Indian National Congress
1972	Jogesh Chandra Sarkar	Indian National Congress
1977	Kamal Guha	All India Forward Bloc
1982	Kamal Guha	All India Forward Bloc
1987	Kamal Guha	All India Forward Bloc
1991	Kamal Guha	All India Forward Bloc
1996	Kamal Guha	Forward Bloc (Socialist)
2001	Kamal Guha	All India Forward Bloc
2006	Ashok Mandal	All India Trinamool Congress
2011	Udayan Guha	All India Forward Bloc
2016	Udayan Guha	All India Trinamool Congress
2021	Nisith Pramanik	Bharatiya Janata Party
2021^	Udayan Guha	All India Trinamool Congress
2026	Ajay Ray	Bharatiya Janata Party

- ^ by-election.

== Election results ==
Vote share of Winning candidates
2026	51.60%
2021 (By-poll)	84.15%
2021	47.60%
2016	45.04%
2011	50.52%
2006	45.55%
2001	53.05%
1996	49.58%
1991	52.54%
1987	55.04%
1982	57.88%
1977	56.32%
1972	58.50%
1971	45.14%
1969	53.48%
1967	55.01%
1962	60.77%
1957	31.24%
1957	24.62%
1952	33.80%
1952	32.97%

=== 2026 ===
In the 2026 West Bengal Legislative Assembly election, Ajay Ray of BJP defeated his nearest rival Udayan Guha of TMC by 17,447 votes.

2026 West Bengal Legislative Assembly election: Dinhata
Party	Candidate	Votes	%	±%
BJP	Ajay Ray	138,255	51.6	▲35.4
AITC	Udayan Guha	120,808	45.09	▼30.99
AIFB	Bikas Mandal	3,042	1.14	▼0.38
INC	Harihar Roy Singha	1,608	0.6	▼3.61
IND	Prabir Kumar Roy Sarkar	1,166	0.44	New entry
IND	Pampa Ray	506	0.19	New entry
SUCI(C)	Ajijul Hoque	432	0.16	New entry
IND	Animesh Barman	294	0.11	New entry
NOTA	Nota	1,814	0.68	▲0.08
Majority		17,447	6.51	▼59.88
Turnout		267,925	96.35	▲25.11
Registered electors		278,074		▼9.07
BJP gain from AITC		Swing	33.19	

=== 2021 bypoll ===
Bye-election, 2021: Dinhata
Party	Candidate	Votes	%	±%
AITC	Udayan Guha	189,575	84.15	+36.57
BJP	Ashok Mandal	25,486	11.31	−36.29
AIFB	Abdur Rouf	6,290	2.79	+0.30
NOTA	None of the above	3,935	1.75	+1.12
Majority		1,64,089	72.84	+72.82
Turnout		2,25,447	75.42	
AITC gain from BJP		Swing		

=== 2021 ===
2021 West Bengal Legislative Assembly election: Dinhata
Party	Candidate	Votes	%	±%
BJP	Nisith Pramanik	116,035	47.60	
AITC	Udayan Guha	115,978	47.58	
AIFB	Abdur Rouf	6,069	2.49	
NOTA	None of the above	1,537	0.63	
Majority		57	0.02	
Turnout		243,751	81.45	
BJP gain from AITC		Swing		

=== 2016 ===
2016 West Bengal Legislative Assembly election: Dinhata
Party	Candidate	Votes	%	±%
AITC	Udayan Guha	100,732	45.04	
AIFB	Akshay Thakur	78,939	35.30	
BJP	Sachindra Nath Adhikari	25,598	11.45	
BSP	Debendra Nath Roy	5,842	2.61	
Independent	Dr. Md. Fazle Haque	4,010	1.79	
WPOI	Aminal Hoque	2,220	0.99	
Independent	Sabitri Basuniya (Roy)	2,170	0.97	
Independent	Anita Barman	777	0.35	
SUCI(C)	Pradip Roy	730	0.33	
NOTA	NOTA	2,619	1.17	
Majority		21,793	9.74	
Turnout		183,022	81.83	
Swing to AITC from AIFB		Swing		

=== 2011 ===
Udayan Guha, the Forward Bloc MLA from Dinhata, joined Trinamool Congress on 1 October 2015.

. In the 2011 election, Udayan Guha of AIFB defeated his nearest rival Dr. Md Fazle Haque Independent.

2011 West Bengal Legislative Assembly election: Dinhata
Party	Candidate	Votes	%	±%
AIFB	Udayan Guha	93,050	50.52	+7.45
IND	Fazle Haque	63,024	34.22	
NCP	Amiya Kumar Sarkar	13,093	7.11	
BSP	Niranjan Barman	4,135	2.25	
BJP	Sudhansu Kumar Roy	3,964	2.15	
Majority		30,026	16.30	
Turnout		1,84,186	82.96	
AIFB gain from AITC		Swing	+7.45	

The outgoing Trinamool Congress MLA, Ashok Mondal, was publicly expelled by Mamata Banerjee for campaigning for Dr. Md. Fazle Haque, dissident Congress leader and MLA from Sitai. Dr. Md. Fazle Haque, contesting as an independent candidate, was a rebel congress leader.

1. Nationalist Congress Party did not contest this seat in 2006.

=== 2006 ===
2006 West Bengal Legislative Assembly election: Dinhata
Party	Candidate	Votes	%	±%
AITC	Ashok Mandal	66,774	45.55	
AIFB	Udayan Guha	63,144	43.07	
Independent	Hitendra Kumar Nag	6,362	4.34	
IPFB	Makbul Hossain Sarkar	5,843	3.99	
BSP	Debendra Nath Roy	2,812	1.92	
Independent	Anarul Sekh	1,666	1.14	
Majority		3,630	2.48	
Turnout				
Swing to AITC from AIFB		Swing		

=== 2001 ===
In the 2001 election, Kamal Guha of AIFB defeated his nearest rival Dipak Sengupta of AITC

West Bengal assembly elections, 2001: Dinhata constituency
Party	Candidate	Votes	%	±%
AIFB	Kamal Kanti Guha	72,887	53.05	+7.45
AITC	Dipak Sengupta	53,167	38.70	
BJP	Madan Mohan Goswami	4,768	3.47	
BSP	Debasish Barman	2,271	1.65	
NCP	Jiban Krishna Saha	1,729	1.26	
Independent	Dinesh Chandra Karji	1,424	1.04	
Independent	Kabita Das	1,152	0.84	
Turnout		137,398	78.07	
Swing to AIFB from Forward Bloc (Socialist)		Swing	+7.45	

=== 1996 ===
1996 West Bengal Legislative Assembly election: Dinhata
Party	Candidate	Votes	%	±%
FB(S)	Kamal Guha	70,531	49.58	
AIFB	Dipak Sen Gupta	37,520	26.37	
INC	Kamal Dey Sarkar	29,899	21.02	
BJP	Jogesh Chandra Ray	3,875	2.72	
Independent	Md. Jamser Byapari	445	0.31	
Majority		33,011	23.21	
Turnout		145,521	87.10	
Swing to Forward Bloc (Socialist) from AIFB		Swing		

=== 1991 ===
1991 West Bengal Legislative Assembly election: Dinhata
Party	Candidate	Votes	%	±%
AIFB	Kamal Kanti Guha	64,530	52.54	
INC	Aldke Nandy	45,929	37.39	
BJP	Amal Bhowmik	11,268	9.17	
BSP	Mrinal Kanti Roy	870	0.71	
AMB	Jashohari Barman	228	0.19	
Majority		18,601	15.15	
Turnout		124,869	83.69	
AIFB hold		Swing		

=== 1987 ===
1987 West Bengal Legislative Assembly election: Dinhata
Party	Candidate	Votes	%	±%
AIFB	Kamal Guha	57,339	55.04	
INC	Alok Kumar Nandy	46,425	44.57	
Independent	Monohari Barman	404	0.39	
Majority		10,914	10.47	
Turnout		105,618	84.20	
AIFB hold		Swing		

=== 1982 ===
1982 West Bengal Legislative Assembly election: Dinhata
Party	Candidate	Votes	%	±%
AIFB	Kamal Guha	53,460	57.88	
INC	Ram Krishna Pal	38,627	41.82	
Independent	Shyamal Kumar Roy	281	0.30	
Majority		14,833	16.06	
Turnout		94,166	86.46	
AIFB hold		Swing		

=== 1977 ===
1977 West Bengal Legislative Assembly election: Dinhata
Party	Candidate	Votes	%	±%
AIFB	Kamal Kanti Guha	33,660	56.32	
INC	Alok Kumar Nandi	12,443	20.82	
JP	Sadhan Basu	6,912	11.57	
Independent	Gogesh Chandra Sarkar	6,751	11.30	
Majority		21,217	35.50	
Turnout		60,926	62.54	
Swing to AIFB from INC		Swing		

=== 1972 ===
1972 West Bengal Legislative Assembly election: Dinhata
Party	Candidate	Votes	%	±%
INC	Jogesh Chandra Sarkar	30,404	58.50	
AIFB	Kamal Guha	20,712	39.85	
Independent	Ram Chandra Saha	855	1.65	
Majority		9,692	18.65	
Turnout		53,331	62.13	
INC hold		Swing		

=== 1971 ===
1971 West Bengal Legislative Assembly election: Dinhata
Party	Candidate	Votes	%	±%
INC	Jogesh Chandra Sarkar	24,249	45.14	
AIFB	Kamal Kanti Guha	21,823	40.63	
CPI(M)	Mani Gopal Roy	4,929	9.18	
INC(O)	Jahiruddin Mia	2,714	5.05	
Majority		2,426	4.51	
Turnout		56,184	66.27	
INC hold		Swing		

=== 1969 ===
1969 West Bengal Legislative Assembly election: Dinhata
Party	Candidate	Votes	%	±%
INC	Animesh Mukharjee	29,764	53.48	
AIFB	Kamal Kanti Guha	24,516	44.05	
PBI	Charu Chanura Mandal	882	1.58	
Independent	Harendra Kumar Roy	490	0.88	
Majority		5,248	9.43	
Turnout		57,082	71.81	
Swing to INC from AIFB		Swing		

=== 1967 ===
1967 West Bengal Legislative Assembly election: Dinhata
Party	Candidate	Votes	%	±%
AIFB	K. K. Guha	29,371	55.01	
INC	U. C. Mandal	23,206	43.46	
SWA	K. K. R. Singha	818	1.53	
Majority		6,165	11.55	
Turnout		56,238	72.72	
AIFB hold		Swing		

=== 1962 ===
1962 West Bengal Legislative Assembly election: Dinhata
Party	Candidate	Votes	%	±%
AIFB	Kamal Kanti Guha	26,807	60.77	
INC	Umesh Chandra Mandal	16,385	37.14	
Independent	Mahesh Chandra Singh	921	2.09	
Majority		10,422	23.63	
Turnout		46,139	46.83	
AIFB win (new seat)				

=== 1957 ===
1957 WB Legislative Assembly election: Dinhata (SC) (Double-member constituency)
Party	Candidate	Votes	%	±%
INC	Umesh Chandra Mandal	41,495	31.24	
INC	Bhawani Prasanna Talukdar	32,707	24.62	
FBL(MG)	Kamal Kanti Guha	24,226	18.24	
FBL(MG)	Bejoy Kumar Roy	21,624	16.28	
Independent	Harsh Chandra Roy Sarkar	7,148	5.38	
Independent	Barindra Kumar Ghosh	5,621	4.23	
Majority		8,481	6.38	
Turnout		132,821	101.26	

=== 1952 ===
1952 WB Legislative Assembly election: Dinhata (Double-member constituency)
Party	Candidate	Votes	%	±%
INC	Satish Chandra Roy Singha	24,388	33.80	
INC	Umesh Chandra Mandal	23,786	32.97	
Independent	Harish Chandra Roy Sarkar	9,489	13.15	
FBL(MG)	Probodh Chandra Pal	6,236	8.64	
CPI	Tarani Kanta Barman	5,498	7.62	
KMPP	Amulya Charan Pal	2,755	3.82	
Majority		14,297	19.82	
Turnout		72,152	73.59	
