= Forward Bloc (Socialist) =

- Abbreviation: FB(S)
- Founded: 1992
- Split from: All India Forward Bloc
- Merged into: All India Forward Bloc
- Headquarters: Jalpaiguri, West Bengal
- Ideology: Socialism
- Political position: Left-wing

Forward Bloc (Socialist), a break-away group from the All India Forward Bloc. The party was primarily based in northern West Bengal. FB(S) was formed in 1992 as a result of a split led by Kamal Guha against the transfer of the Tin Bigha Corridor to Bangladesh.

In the Lok Sabha elections 1996 FB(S) had launched two candidates from West Bengal. Hiten Barman from Cooch Behar got 145,078 votes (15.56%) and Mihir Kumar Roy got 27,607 votes (3.09%) in Jalpaiguri. In the state Legislative Assembly election in West Bengal 1996, FB(S) had launched 20 candidates, who together got 123,316 votes. One candidate got elected, Kamal Guha from Dinhata (70,531 votes, 49.58%).

In the Lok Sabha elections 1998 FB(S) was with the Indian National Congress. The party launched one candidate in Cooch Behar, north West Bengal, supported by Congress. The candidate, Gobinda Roy, came second with 272,974 votes (30.16%). Later FB(S) and AIFB were reunited.
