= Kamal Guha =

Indian politician (1928–2007)

Kamal Kanti Guha

Minister for Agriculture, Agriculture Marketing & Public Health Engineering, Government of West Bengal
- In office 1977–2006

Member of West Bengal Legislative Assembly
- In office 1977–2006
- Constituency: Dinhata
- In office 1962–1969
- Constituency: Dinhata

Personal details
- Born: 20 January 1928 Dacca, Bengal Presidency, British India
- Died: 6 August 2007 (aged 79) Cooch Behar, West Bengal, India
- Party: All India Forward Bloc
- Education: Bachelor with Honours
- Alma mater: University of Calcutta; Presidency University
- Profession: Politician, social worker

Kamal Guha (1928–2007) was an Indian politician. He was an All India Forward Bloc leader and member of the Left Front cabinet in the Indian state of West Bengal for over two decades.

== Early life ==
Kamal Guha was born at Dinhata on 20 January 1928. He graduated from Dinhata High School, and passed Intermediate Arts from Victoria College (now Acharya Brojendra Nath Seal College) in Cooch Behar, which was then affiliated with the University of Calcutta. Guha was inspired by Subhas Chandra Bose at a very young age. He decided to join the Forward Bloc when he was still a student. Guha is one of the childhood friend of Hussain Muhammad Ershad, former president of Bangladesh.

== Political career ==
Guha was first elected to the Dinhata seat of the West Bengal Legislative Assembly in the 1962 West Bengal Legislative Assembly election. He was re-elected to this seat in 1967, but lost in 1969. He was re-elected in 1977, holding the seat through the 1982, 1987, 1991, 1996, and 2001 elections. In 1977, 1982, 1987, and 2001 he was a cabinet member. His various portfolios included agriculture, agriculture marketing and public health engineering. He chose not to run for re-election in the 2006 election.

Guha was a driving force behind the expansion of the Forward Bloc party in West Bengal. In the late 1980s, he took up the cause of people living the India–Bangladesh enclaves. In 1992, he was expelled by his party because of disagreements over handing over the Tin Bigha corridor to Bangladesh. He formed a splinter party, Forward Bloc (Socialist), and won the 1996 election against the official Left Front candidate. He returned to the Forward Bloc for the 2001 election.

Guha was seen as an anti-Communist Party of India (Marxist) (CPI(M)) voice within the Left Front. He was firmly against the state government's market-driven farm policy. In 2002, he stated publicly that he felt that "indiscriminate recruitment of CPI(M) cadres by government departments and frequent increase in their salary has made the West Bengal government bankrupt."

Guha died on 6 August 2007. In a memorial, Forward Bloc leader Debabrata Biswas said that Guha was a "leader of the people and always fought for the rights of the toiling masses."
