= Dinhata subdivision =

- Subdivision
- Interactive map of Dinhata subdivision
- Coordinates: 26.13°N 89.47°E
- Country: India
- State: West Bengal
- District: Cooch Behar
- Headquarters: Dinhata

Languages
  - Official: Bengali
  - Additional official: English
- Time zone: UTC+5:30 (IST)
- Postal code: 736135
- ISO 3166 code: IN-WB
- Vehicle registration: WB-64
- Website: dinhata.in

Dinhata subdivision is a subdivision of the Cooch Behar district in the state of West Bengal, India.

== Subdivisions ==
Cooch Behar district is divided into the following administrative subdivisions:

Subdivision	Headquarters	Area km^{2}	Population (2011)	Rural Population % (2011)	Urban Population % (2011)
Mekhliganj	Mekhliganj	459.78	282,750	90.09	9.91
Mathabhanga	Mathabhanga	896.26	654,831	96.35	3.65
Cooch Behar Sadar	Cooch Behar	754.84	748,394	77.92	22.08
Tufanganj	Tufanganj	586.44	456,319	93.02	6.97
Dinhata	Dinhata	692.02	676,792	94.02	5.98
Cooch Behar district	Cooch Behar	3,387.00	2,819,026	89.73	10.27

Places in the Tufanganj and Dinhata subdivisions (except Sitai CD block) in Cooch Behar district
CT: census town, M: municipal town, R: rural/ urban centre, H: historical/ religious centre
Owing to space constraints in the small map, the actual locations in a larger map may vary slightly

=== Administrative units ===
Dinhata subdivision has 2 police stations, 3 community development blocks, 3 panchayat samitis, 33 gram panchayats, 302 mouzas, 300 inhabited villages, 1 municipality and 1 census town. The municipality is: Dinhata. The census town is: Bhangri Pratham Khanda. The subdivision has its headquarters at Dinhata.

== Police stations ==
The police stations in the Dinhata subdivision have the following features and jurisdiction:

Police Station	Area covered km^{2}	International border	Inter-state border km	Municipal Town	CD block
Dinhata	514	n/a	-	Dinhata	Dinhata I
Dinhata Women	-	-	-	-	-
Sahebganj	n/a	n/a	-	-	Dinhata II ?
Sitai	156.82	n/a	-	-	Sitai

=== Blocks ===
Community development blocks in the Dinhata subdivision are:

CD block	Headquarters	Area km^{2}	Population (2011)	SC %	ST %	Literacy rate %	Census Towns
Dinhata I	Dinhata	279.67	286,269	43.97	0.41	73.23	1
Dinhata II	Sahebganj	246.98	244,066	43.78	0.51	72.33	-
Sitai	Sitai	160.82	110,333	66.09	0.19	62.79	-

== Gram panchayats ==
The subdivision contains 33 gram panchayats under 3 community development blocks:

- Dinhata I block consists of 16 gram panchayats, viz. Bara Atia bari–I, Dinhata Village–II, Gosanimari–II, Putimari–I, Bara Atiabari–II, Gitaldaha–I, Matalhat, Putimari–II, Bara Soulmari, Gitaldaha–II, Okrabari, BHETAGURI–I, Dinhata Village–I, Gosanimari–I, Petla and Bhetaguri–II.
- Dinhata II block consists of 12 gram panchayats, viz. Bamanhat–I, –II, Kishamat Dasgram, Sukarukuthi, Bamanhat–II, Chowdhurihat, Najirhat–I, Barasakdal, Gobra Chhara Nayarhat Najirhat–II, Burirhat–I and Sahebganj.
- Sitai block consists of five gram panchayats, viz. Adabari, Chamta, Sitai–II, Brahmottar–Chatra and Sitai–I.

== Education ==
Given in the table below is a comprehensive picture of the education scenario in Cooch Behar district, with data for the year 2012–13.

Subdivision	Primary School		Middle School		High School		Higher Secondary School		General College, Univ		Technical / Professional Instt		Non-formal Education	
Subdivision	Institution	Student	Institution	Student	Institution	Student	Institution	Student	Institution	Student	Institution	Student	Institution	Student
Mekhliganj	216	24,210	52	27,782	4	4,012	21	27,680	2	2858	1	55	456	25,387
Mathabhanga	432	52,235	80	52,338	14	113,452	42	61,315	4	3,910	8	578	1,171	70,179
Cooch Behar Sadar	441	61,375	47	15,322	33	35,204	56	59,614	6	8,934	29	3,749	1,195	61,733
Tufanganj	310	31,205	72	45,231	46	17,510	30	38,274	2	2,871	3	275	950	36,293
Dinhata	431	42,213	46	14,723	27	31,836	29	44,946	1	3,492	4	381	1,228	1,950
Cooch Behar district	1,830	211,247	297	154,943	94	102,014	178	231,829	15	22,065	45	5,038	5,000	223,323

Note: Primary schools include junior basic schools; middle schools, high schools and higher secondary schools include madrasahs; technical schools include junior technical schools, junior government polytechnics, industrial technical institutes, industrial training centres, nursing training institutes etc.; technical and professional colleges include engineering colleges, medical colleges, para-medical institutes, management colleges, teachers training and nursing training colleges, law colleges, art colleges, music colleges etc. Special and non-formal education centres include sishu siksha kendras, madhyamik siksha kendras, centres of Rabindra mukta vidyalaya, recognised Sanskrit tols, institutions for the blind and other handicapped persons, Anganwadi centres, reformatory schools etc.

=== Educational institution ===
The following institution is located in Dinhata subdivision:

- Dinhata College was established in 1956 at Dinhata.

== Healthcare ==
The table below (all data in numbers) presents an overview of the medical facilities available and patients treated in the hospitals, health centres and sub-centres in 2013 in Cooch Behar district, with data for the year 2012–13.:

Subdivision	Health & Family Welfare Deptt, WB				Other State Govt Deptts	Local bodies	Central Govt Deptts / PSUs	NGO / Private Nursing Homes	Total	Total Number of Beds	Total Number of Doctors*	Indoor Patients	Outdoor Patients
Subdivision	Hospitals	Rural Hospitals	Block Primary Health Centres	Primary Health Centres	Other State Govt Deptts	Local bodies	Central Govt Deptts / PSUs	NGO / Private Nursing Homes	Total	Total Number of Beds	Total Number of Doctors*	Indoor Patients	Outdoor Patients
Mekhliganj	1	1	1	5	-	-	-	1	9	255	32	23,850	185,720
Mathabhanga	1	-	2	7	-	-	-	3	13	297	45	44,730	712,513
Cooch Behar Sadar	4	-	2	7	1	-	2	9	25	1,030	115	96,233	560,813
Tufanganj	1	-	2	5	1	-	-	3	12	266	38	46,232	560,813
Dinhata	1	-	3	7	-	-	-	3	14	429	50	62,943	624,514
Cooch Behar district	8	1	10	31	2	-	2	19	73	2,277	280	273,988	3,145,902

.* Excluding nursing homes.

=== Medical facilities ===
Medical facilities in the Dinhata subdivision are as follows:

Hospitals: (Name, location, beds)

- Dinhata Subdivisional Hospital, Dinhata M, 180 beds

Rural Hospitals: (Name, CD block, location, beds)

- Bamanhat Rural Hospital, Dinhata II CD block, Bamanhat, 30 beds
- Sitai Rural Hospital, Sitai CD block, Sitaihat, 30 beds

Block Primary Health Centres: (Name, CD block, location, beds)

- Gosanimari Block Primary Health Centre, Dinhata I CD block, Gosanimari, 30 beds

Primary Health Centres : (CD block-wise)(CD block, PHC location, beds)

- Dinhata I CD block: Okrabari (6)
- Dinhata II CD block: Kisamath (Dasgram) (4), Tharaikhana (2), Nayerhat (10), Najirkhana (6)
- Sitai CD block: Nakarjan (4), Adabari (PO Kisamat Adabari) (4)

== Legislative segments ==
As per order of the Delimitation Commission in respect of the delimitation of constituencies in the West Bengal, the Dinhata municipality, Dinhata–II block and Bhetaguri–I, Dinhata Village–I, Dinhata Village–II and Putimari–I gram panchayats of Dinhata–I block together will constitute the Dinhata assembly constituency of West Bengal. The other twelve gram panchayats of Dinhata–I block, viz. Bara Atiabari–I, Gosanimari–II, Bara Atiabari–II, Gitaldaha–I, Matalhat, Putimari–II, Bara Soulmari, Gitaldaha–II, Okrabari, Gosanimari–I, Petla and Bhetaguri–II will form the Sitai assembly constituency along with the whole area under Sitai block. Sitai constituency will be reserved for Scheduled castes (SC) candidates. Both constituencies will be part of Cooch Behar (Lok Sabha constituency), which will be reserved for SC candidates.
