= Udayan Guha =

Indian politician

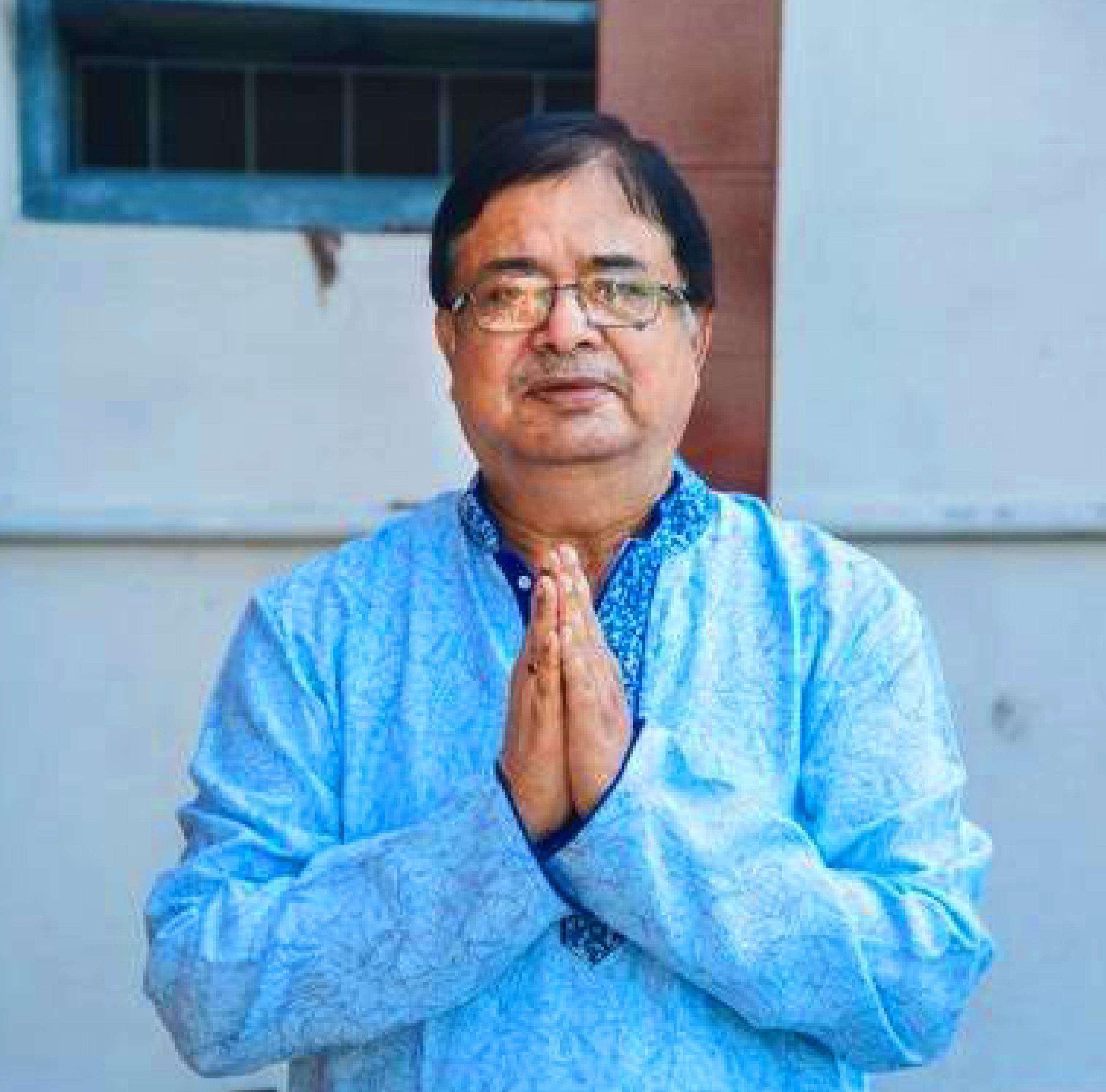

Cabinet Minister, Government of West Bengal
- In office 3 August 2022 – 4 May 2026
- Governor: La. Ganesan (additional charge); C. V. Ananda Bose; R. N. Ravi
- Chief Minister: Mamata Banerjee
- Ministry/Department: Department of North Bengal Development, Government of West Bengal
- Succeeded by: Nisith Pramanik

Member of the West Bengal Legislative Assembly
- In office 20 May 2011 – 2 May 2021
- Preceded by: Ashok Mondal
- Succeeded by: Nisith Pramanik
- Constituency: Dinhata
- Majority: 164,089
- In office 2 November 2021 – 4 May 2026
- Preceded by: Nisith Pramanik
- Succeeded by: Ajay Ray
- Constituency: Dinhata

Personal details
- Born: 3 January 1955 (age 71)
- Party: Trinamool Congress (2015–present) All India Forward Bloc (1991–2015)
- Children: 1
- Parent: Kamal Guha (father)
- Occupation: Politician

Udayan Guha (born 3 January 1955) is an Indian politician who previously served as Cabinet Minister for Department of North Bengal Development of the Government of West Bengal from 2022 till 2026. He is a three-term member of the West Bengal Legislative Assembly from Dinhata.

He represented the Dinhata from 2011 to 2021. In 2021 by-election for Dinhata, he won again with a record margin of 164,088 votes.

He is from the All India Trinamool Congress and previously from the All India Forward Bloc. In 2026 West Bengal Legislative Assembly election Guha was defeated in the Dinhata constituency by BJP candidate Ajay Ray.He was arrested on 17th june 2026 for various reasons such as cut money, abas yojna corruption,etc.
