= Dinhata =

- City
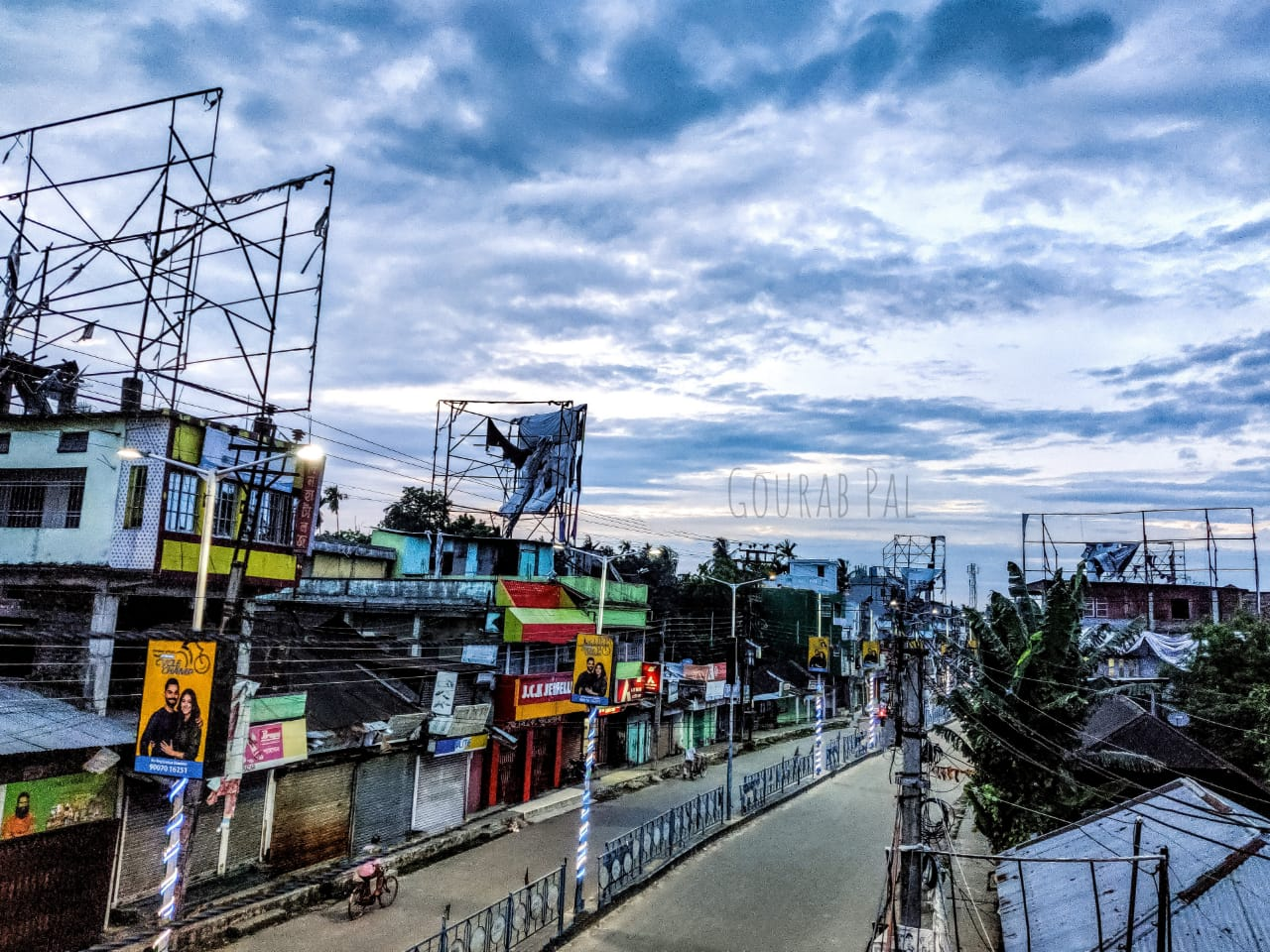

- Location in West Bengal, India Dinhata (India) Dinhata (Asia)
- Coordinates: 26.13°N 89.47°E
- Country: India
- State: West Bengal
- District: Cooch Behar

Government
  - Type: Municipality
  - Body: Dinhata Municipality

Area
  - Total: 4.55 km^{2} (1.76 sq mi)
- Elevation: 36 m (118 ft)

Population (2011)
  - Total: 36,124
  - Density: 7,940/km^{2} (20,600/sq mi)

Languages
  - Official: Bengali
  - Additional official: English
  - Local dialect: Kuchbihari
- Time zone: UTC+5:30 (IST)
- PIN: 736135
- Telephone code: 03581
- Vehicle registration: WB-64
- Lok Sabha constituency: Cooch Behar (SC)
- Vidhan Sabha constituency: Dinhata, Sitai (SC)
- Website: dinhata.in

Dinhata (Bengali pronunciation: [dinɦaʈa]), is a city and a municipality in Cooch Behar district in the state of West Bengal, India. It is the headquarters of the Dinhata subdivision. Apart from the city area, Dinhata consists of 3 blocks.

== Geography ==
Places in the Tufanganj and Dinhata subdivisions (except Sitai CD block) in Cooch Behar district
CT: census town, M: municipal town, R: rural/ urban centre, H: historical/ religious centre
Owing to space constraints in the small map, the actual locations in a larger map may vary slightly

=== Location ===
Dinhata is located at 26.13°N 89.47°E. It has an average elevation of 36 metres (118 feet).

According to the District Census Handbook 2011, Koch Bihar, Dinhata covered an area of 4.55 km^{2}.

=== Area overview ===
The map alongside shows the eastern part of the district. In Tufanganj subdivision 6.97% of the population lives in the urban area and 93.02% in the rural areas. In Dinhata subdivision 5.98% of the population lives in the urban areas and 94.02% lives in the rural areas. The entire district forms the flat alluvial flood plains of mighty rivers.

Note: The map alongside presents some of the notable locations in the subdivisions. All places marked in the map are linked in the larger full screen map.

== Demographics ==
As per 2011 Census of India Dinhata had a total population of 36,124 of which 18,344 (51%) were males and 17,780 (49%) were females. Population in the age range 0–6 years was 2,485. The total number of literate persons in Dinhata was 30,487 (91.61% of the population over 6 years).

For information regarding language and religion see Dinhata I#Language and religion and Dinhata II#Language and religion

As of 2001 India census, Dinhata had a population of 34,303. Males constitute 51% of the population and females 49%. Dinhata has an average literacy rate of 80%, higher than the national average of 59.5%: male literacy is 84% and, female literacy is 75%. In Dinhata, 9% of the population is under 6 years of age.

== Civic administration ==
=== Police station ===
Dinhata police station has jurisdiction over Dinhata municipal area and Dinhata I CD block.

=== CD block HQ ===
The headquarters of the Dinhata I CD block are located at Dinhata town.

=== Municipality ===
The total number of wards in the municipality are 16.

== Education ==
Dinhata College was established in 1956. Affiliated with the Cooch Behar Panchanan Barma University, it offers courses in arts, science and commerce.

A regional station of the Central Tobacco Research Institute, India is located in this town.

== Healthcare ==
Dinhata Subdivisional Hospital at Dinhata functions with 180 beds.

== Transport ==
Dinhata Railway Station serves the city of Dinhata, the station lies under Alipurduar railway division of Northeast Frontier Railway.

== Notable people ==
- GM Quader, former Bangladeshi commerce minister
- Hossain Mohammad Ershad, former President of Bangladesh
- Hossain Mokbul Shahriar, Bangladeshi politician
- Merina Rahman, Bangladeshi MP
- Mozammel Hossain Lalu, Bangladeshi politician
- Saad Ershad, Bangladeshi businessman
- Kamal Guha, former Agriculture Minister of the Government of West Bengal
- Dipak Sen Gupta, Freedom fighter and one of the leading participants of Goa Freedom Movement from West Bengal in 1955, former Member of West Bengal Legislative Assembly for 4 consecutive terms and Chairman of Dinhata Municipality
- Udayan Guha, MLA from Dinhata constituency in West Bengal Legislative Assembly

== Gallery ==
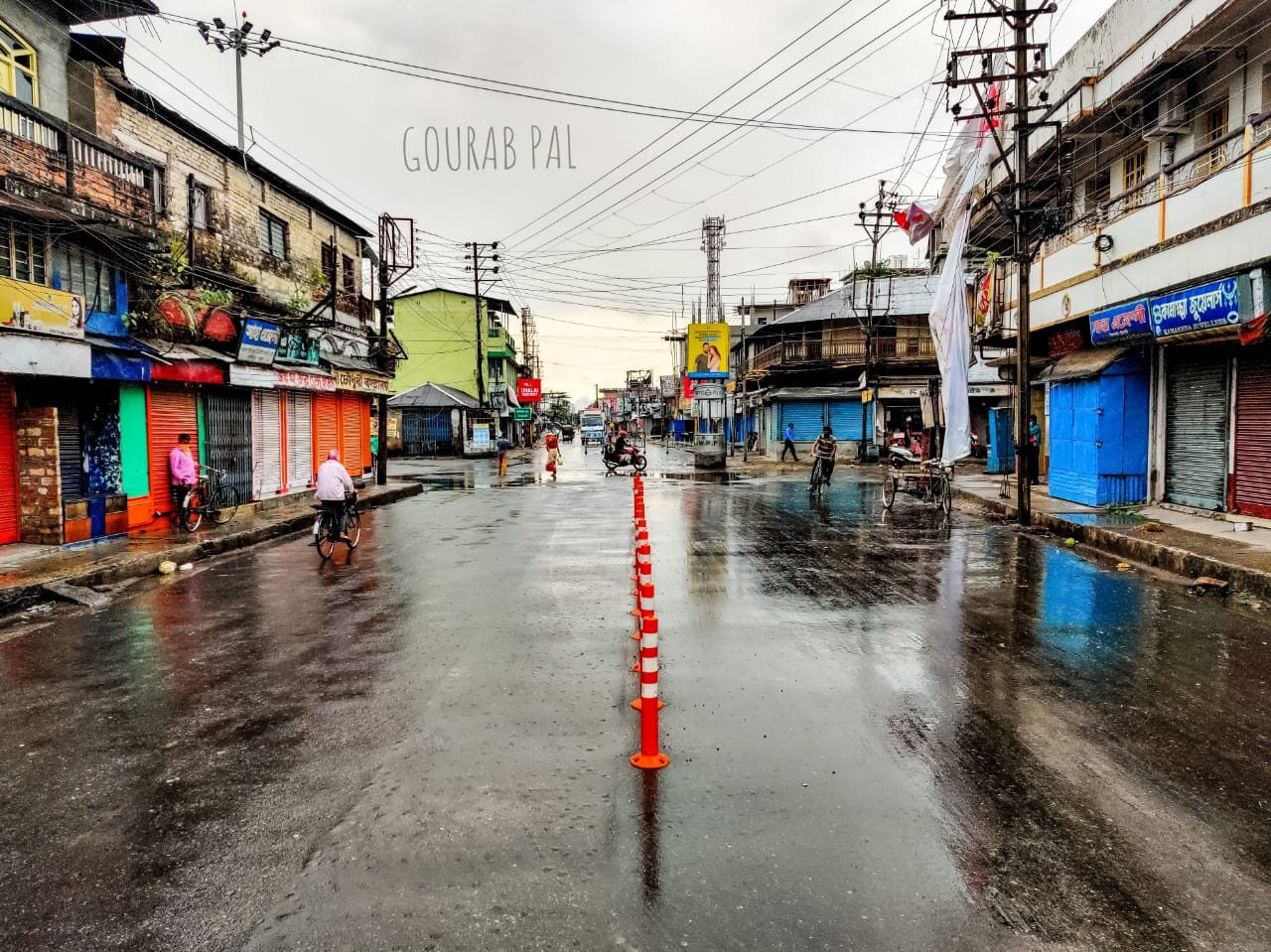
Chowpathi

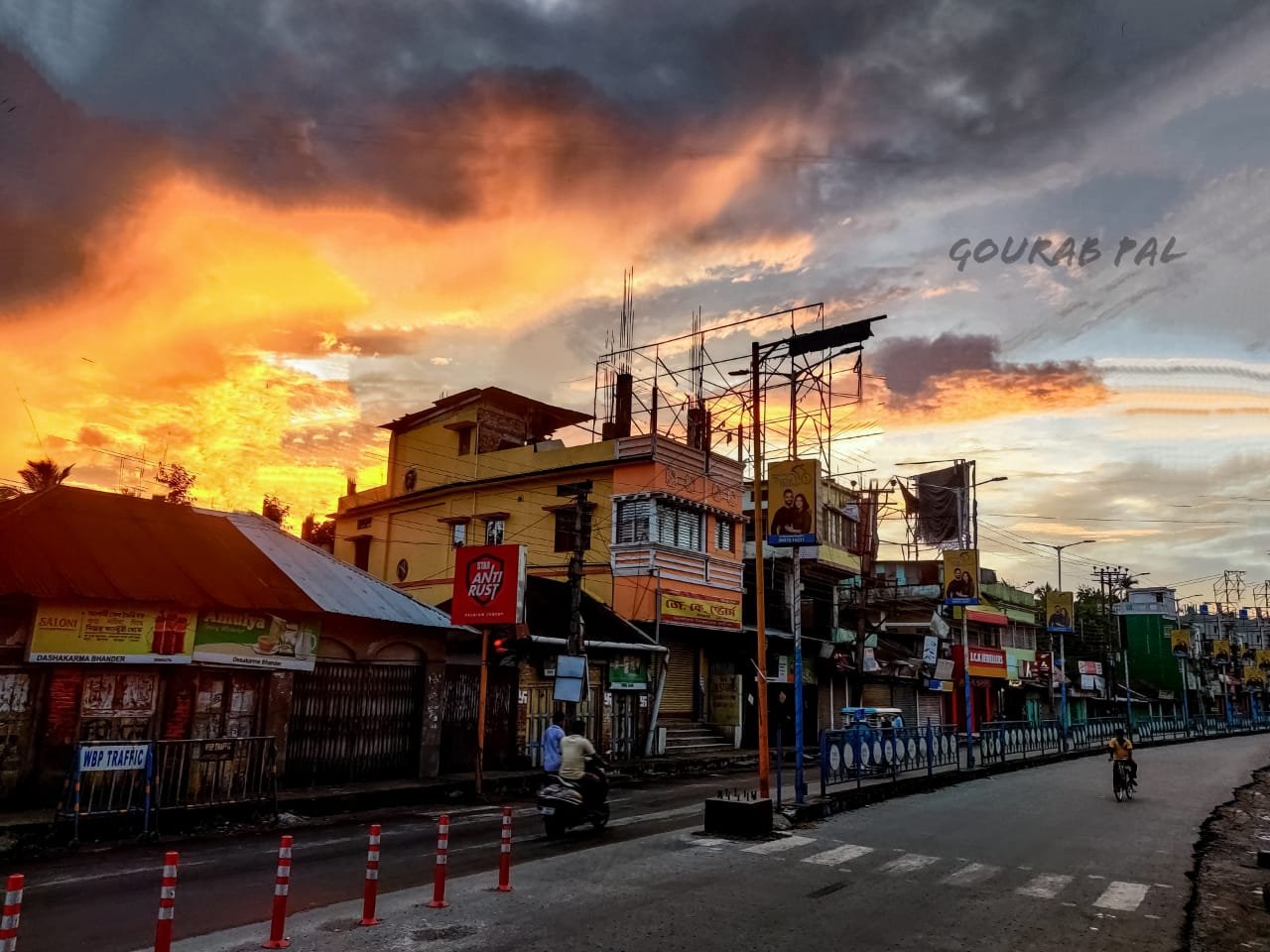
Dinhata Main Road

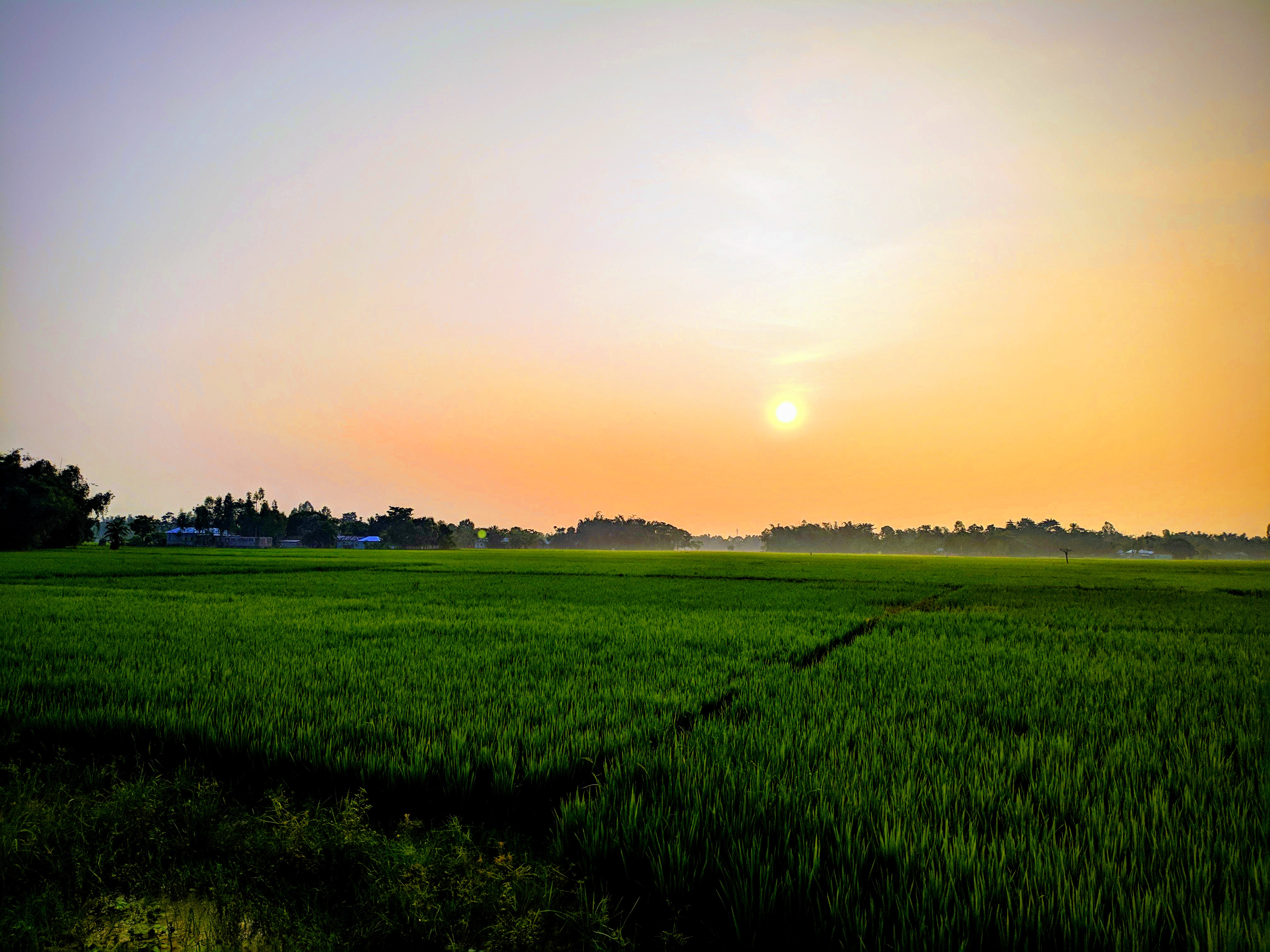
Dinhata's Village Side

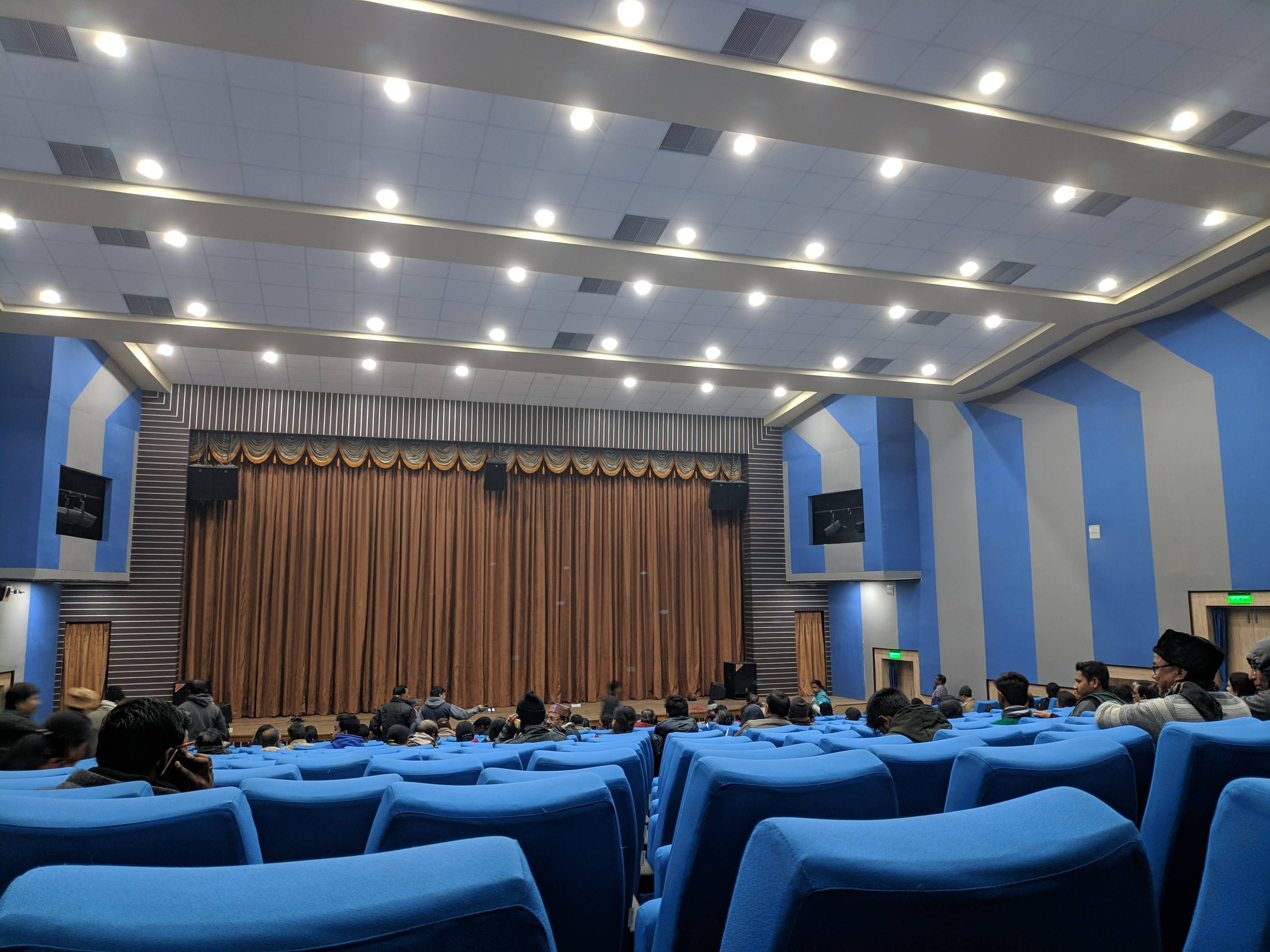
Inside picture of Nripendra Narayan Memorial Hall (Smriti Sadan)

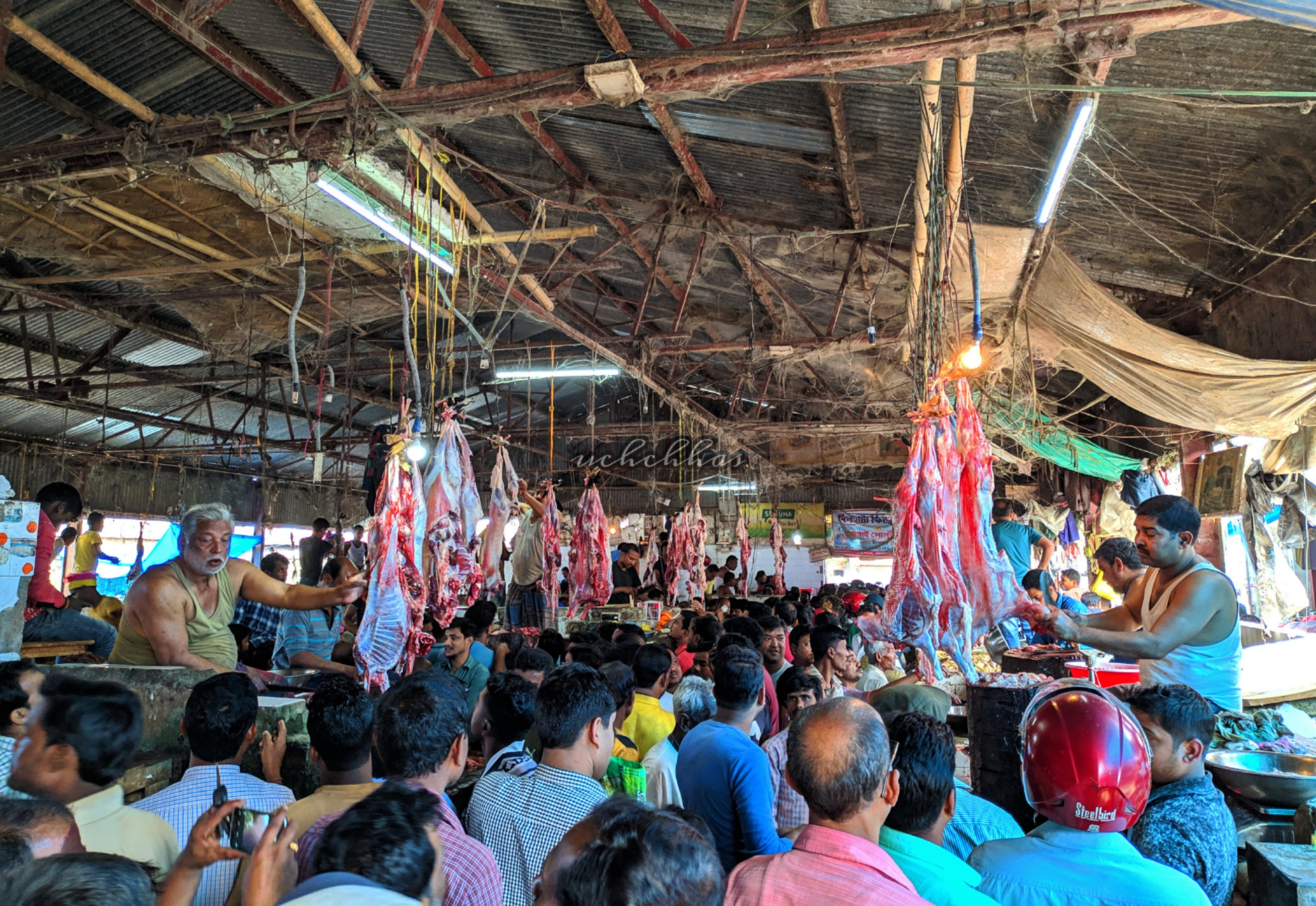
Its a new meat and fish market

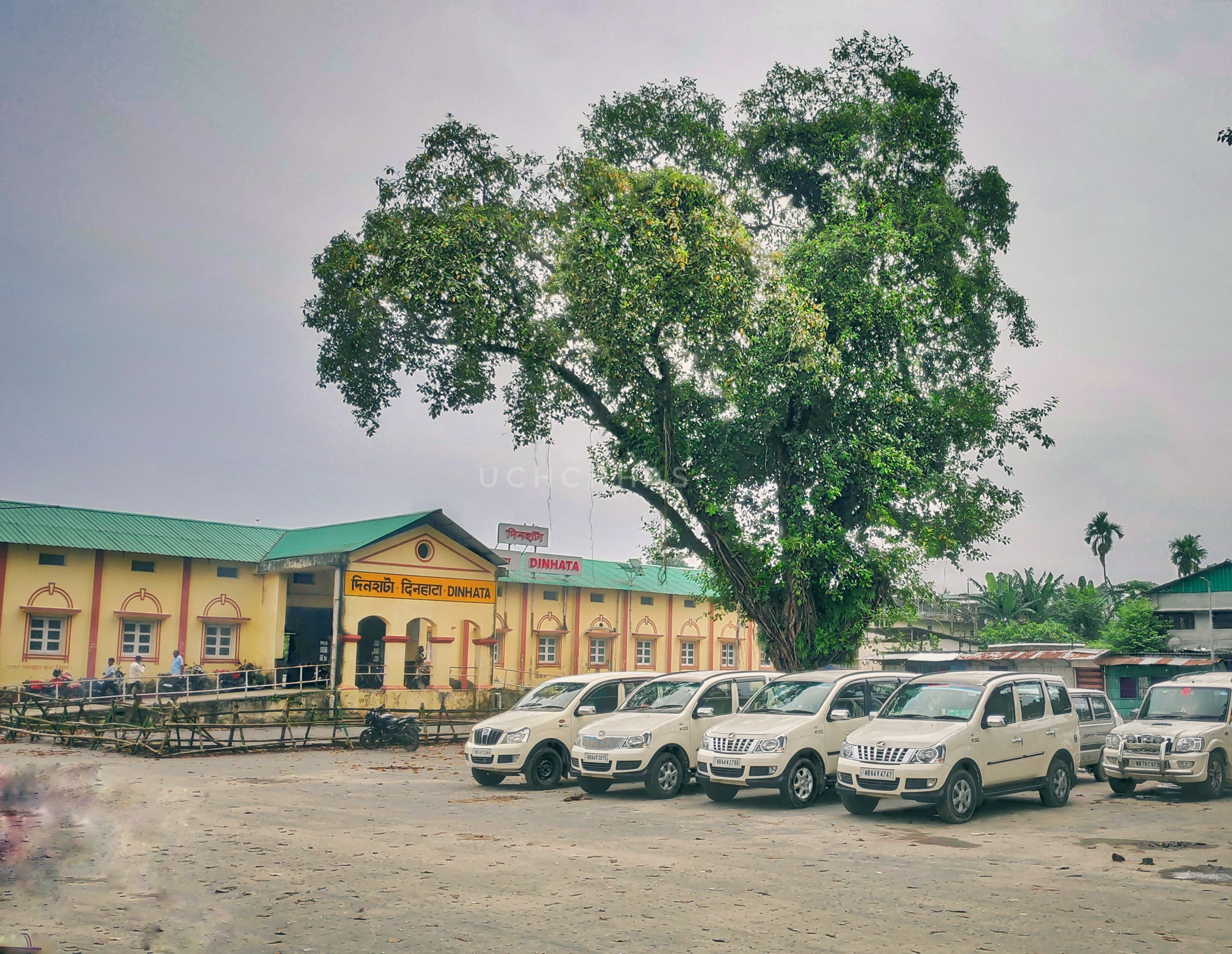
Dinhata Railway Station

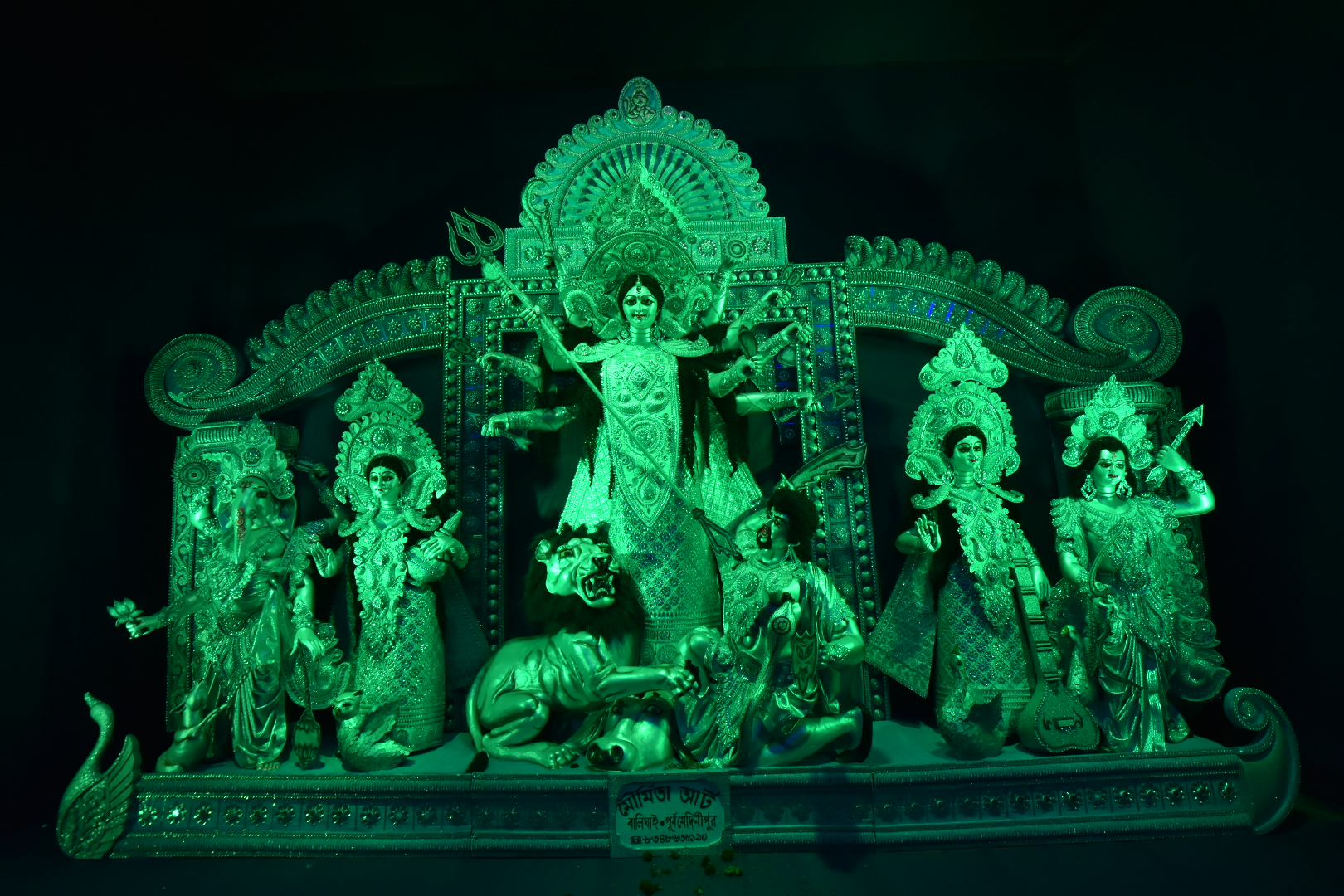
Dinhata's Durga Puja

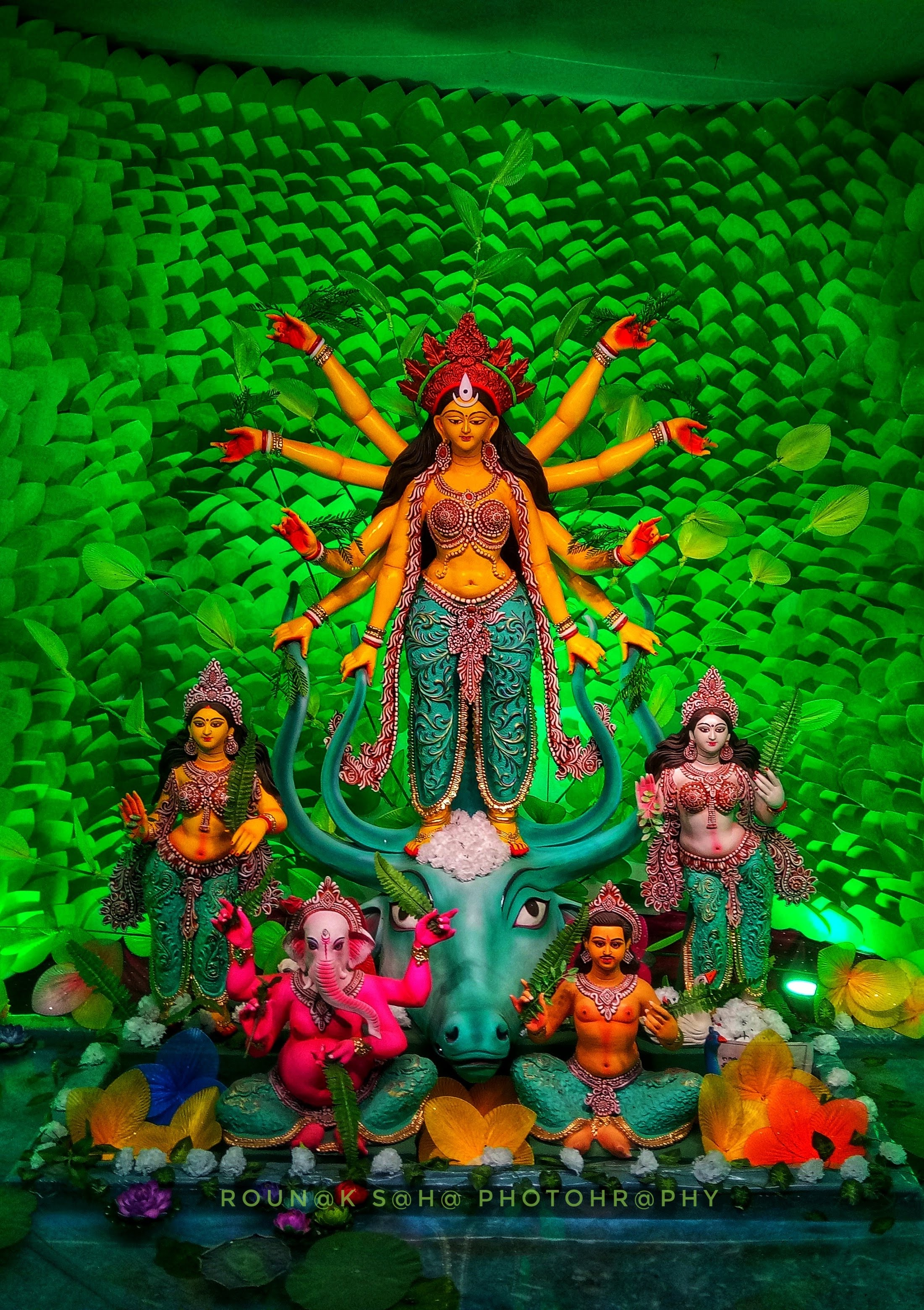
Dinhata's Durga Puja

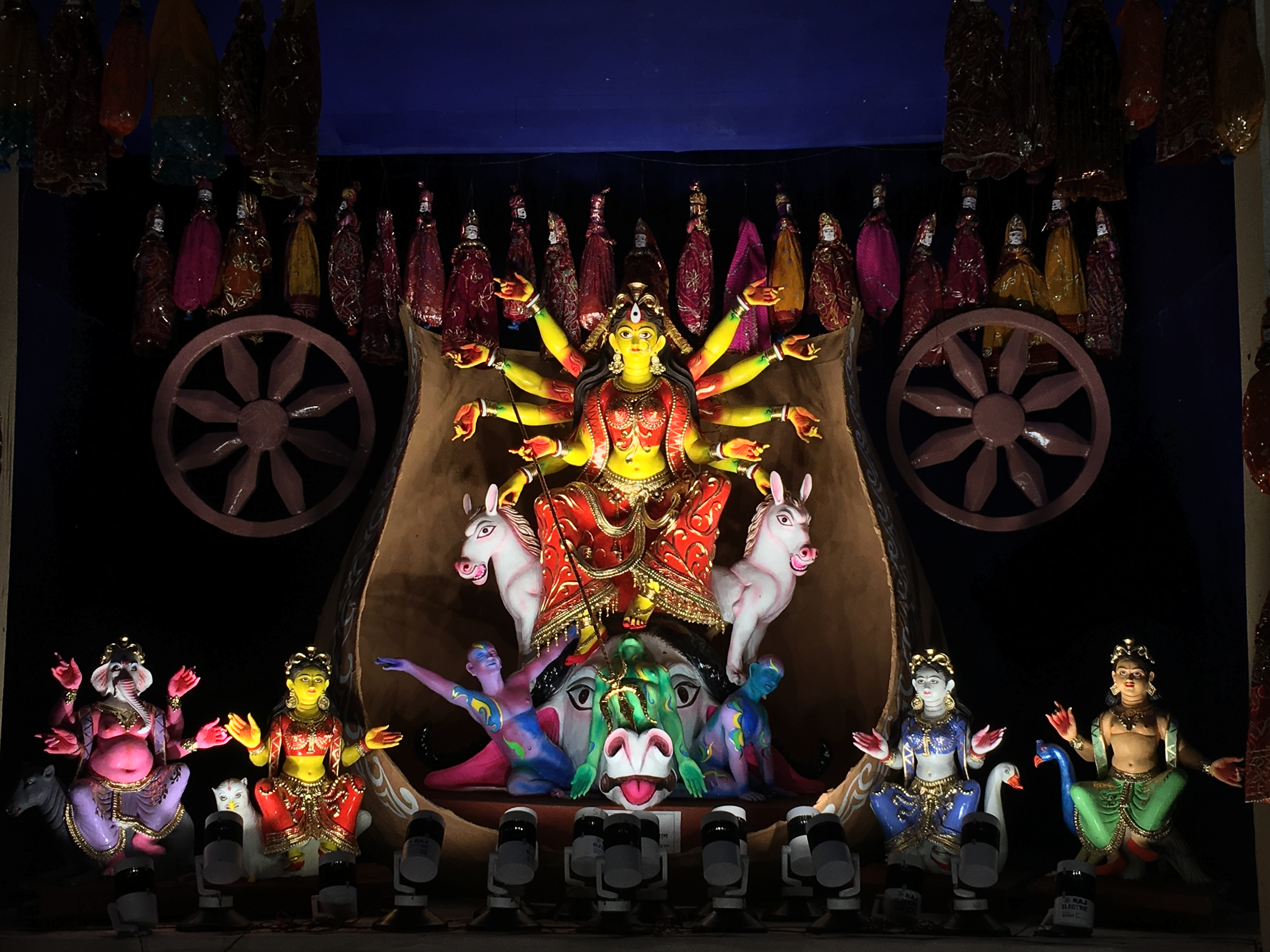
Durga Puja of Dinhata

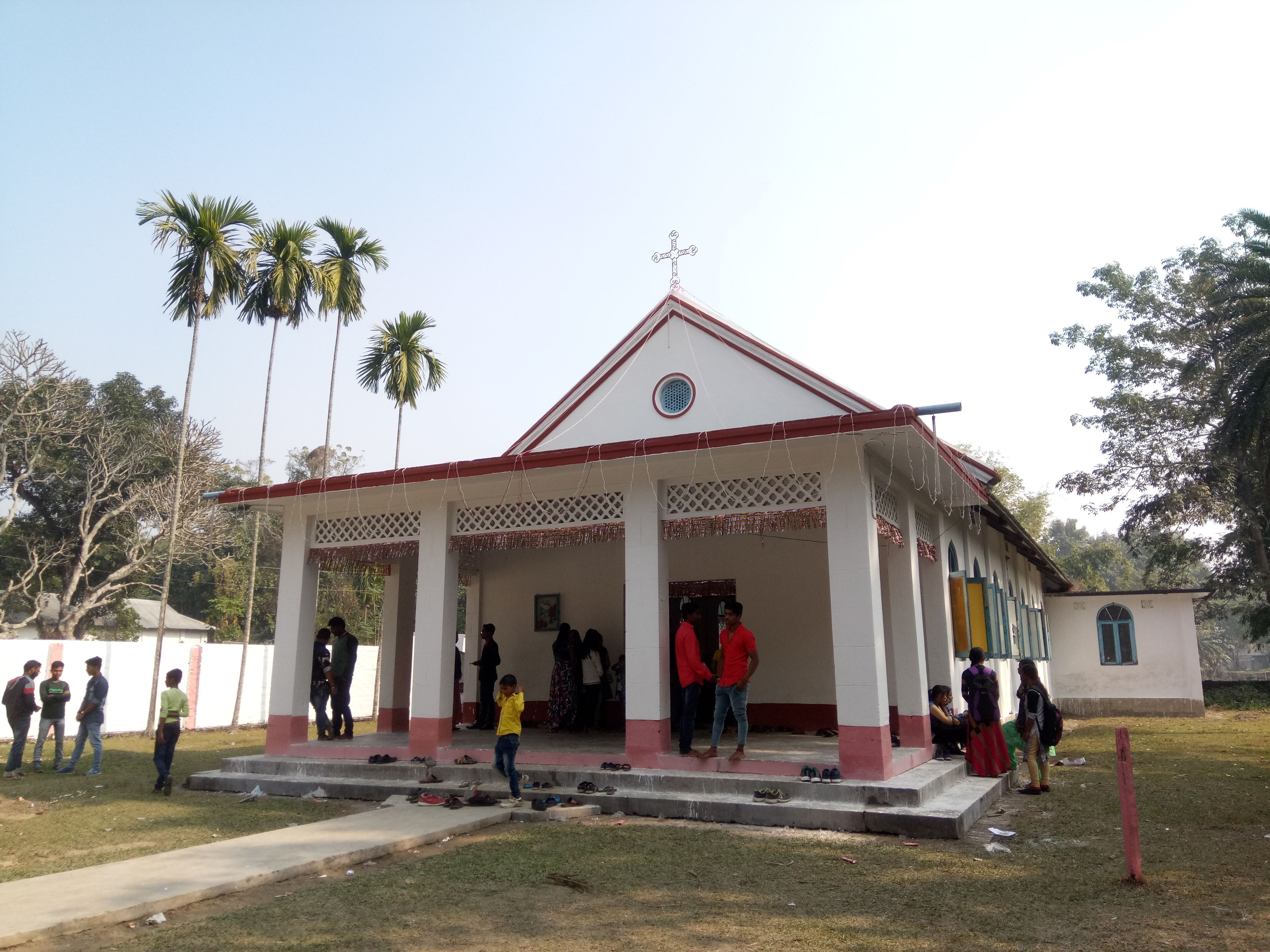
Church Of Dinhata

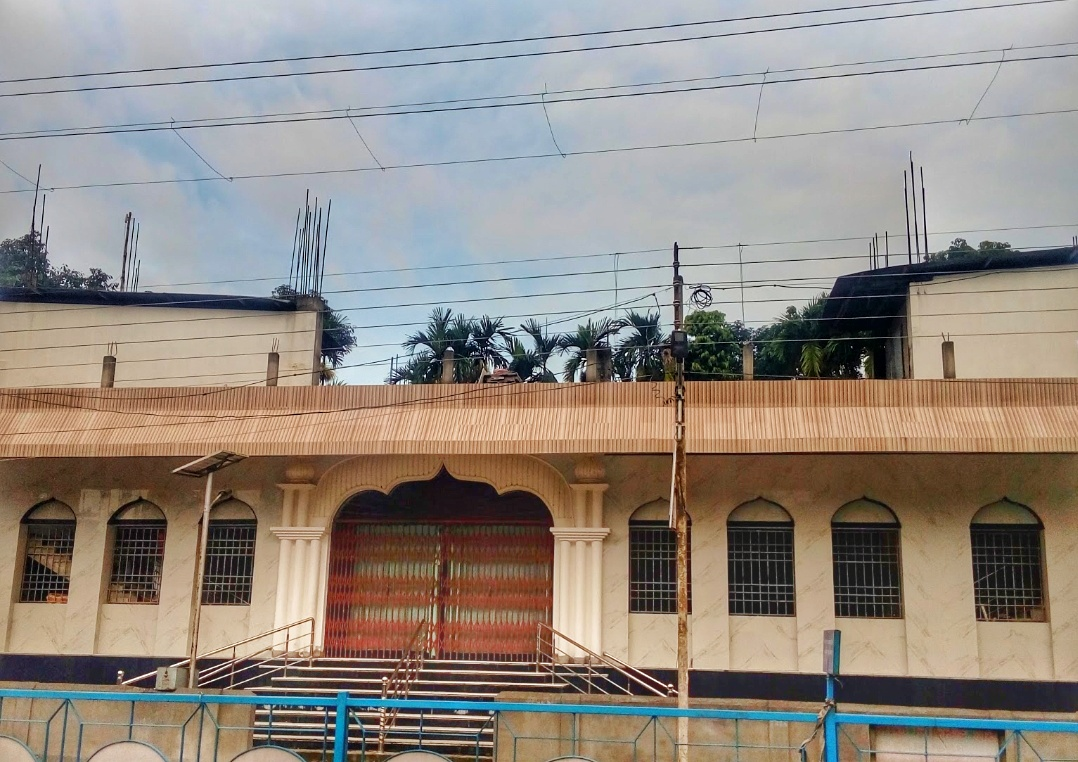
Jam E masjid, A mosque Of Dinhata

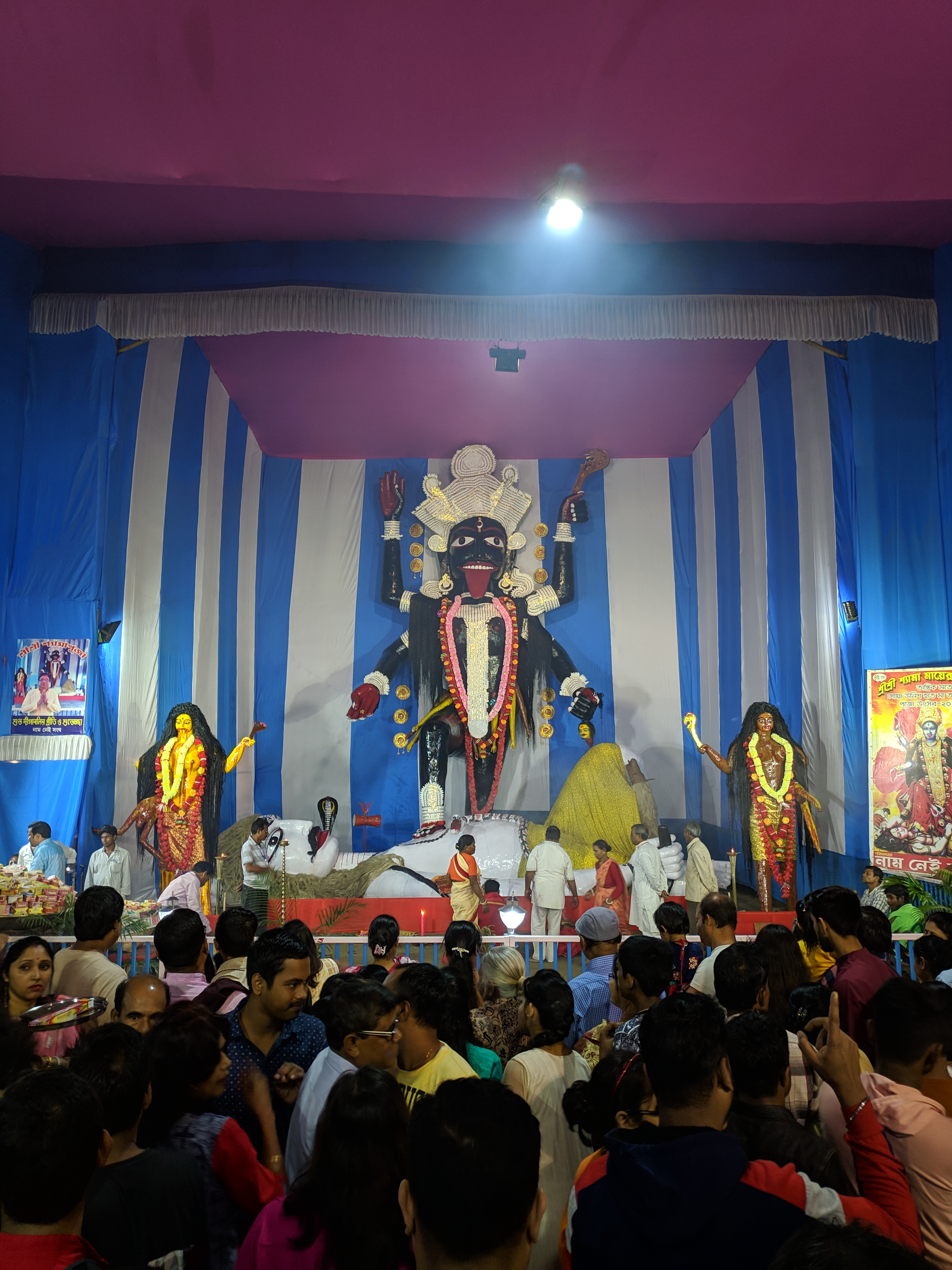
The Biggest Kali goddess Idol of Dinhata

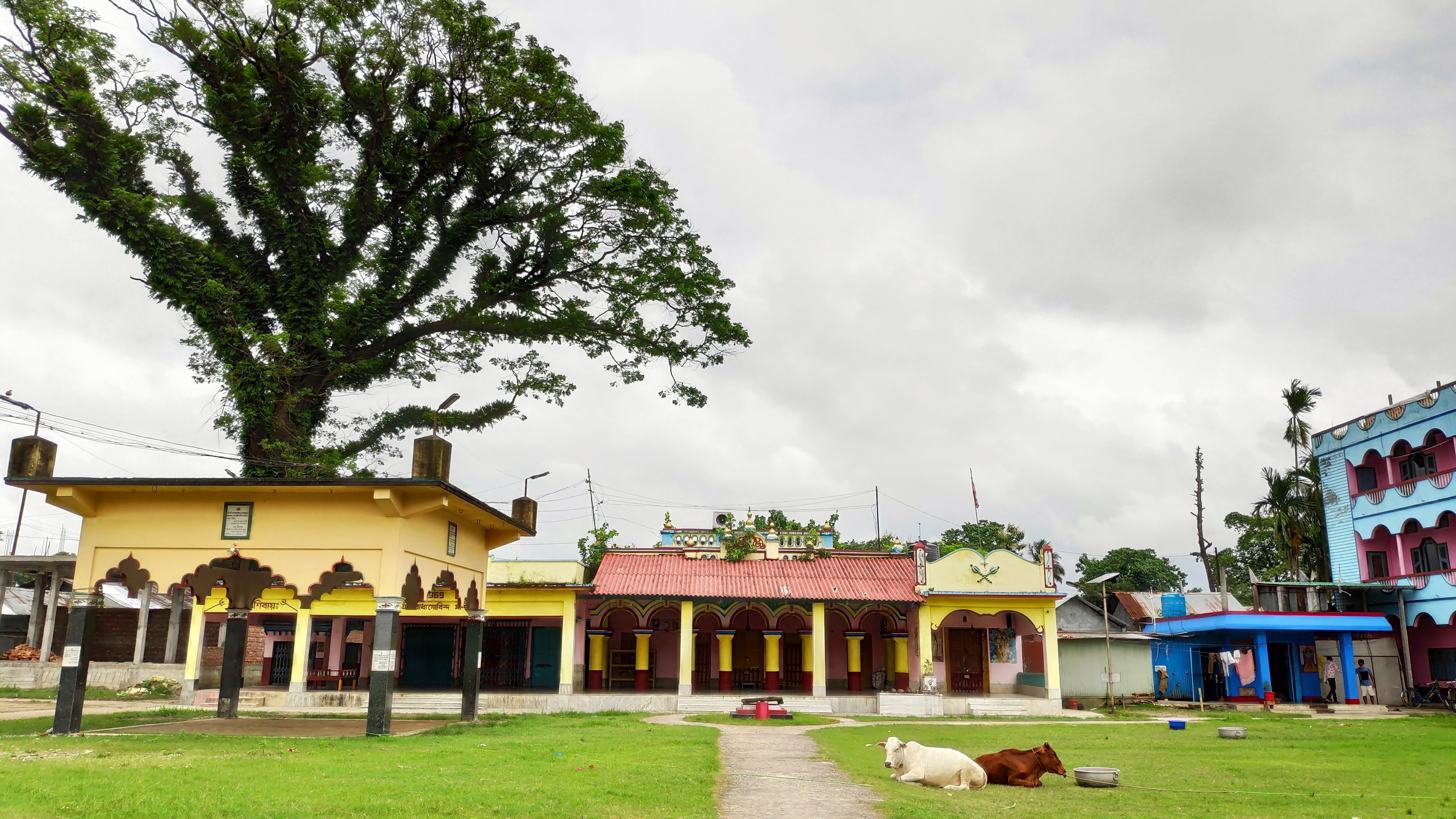
Ma Mahamaya Path Temple Of Dinhata

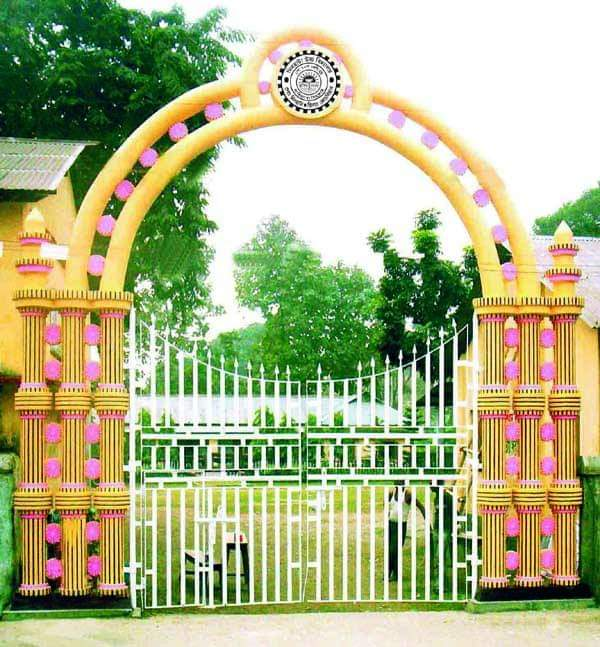
dinhata high school. it was established in 1890

== See also ==
- Coochbehar
- Jalpaiguri
- Basirhat
- Malda
- Siliguri
- Alipurduar
