= Dinhata II =

- Community development block
- Interactive map of Dinhata II
- Coordinates: 26.1230700°N 89.6143800°E
- Country: India
- State: West Bengal
- District: Cooch Behar

Government
  - Type: Representative democracy

Area
  - Total: 246.98 km^{2} (95.36 sq mi)

Population (2011)
  - Total: 244,066
  - Density: 988.20/km^{2} (2,559.4/sq mi)

Languages
  - Official: Bengali, English
- Time zone: UTC+5:30 (IST)
- Lok Sabha constituency: Cooch Behar
- Vidhan Sabha constituency: Dinhata
- Website: coochbehar.gov.in

Dinhata II is a community development block (CD block) that forms an administrative division in the Dinhata subdivision of the Cooch Behar district in the Indian state of West Bengal.

== Geography ==
Sahebganj, one of the constituent panchayats of the block, is located at 26°07′23″N 89°36′52″E.

Topographically Cooch Behar district is generally plain land which is low and marshy at some places. “Considering the nature of general surface configuration, relief and drainage pattern, distribution of different types of soil, climatic condition, the formation of geology and forest tracts, the district Koch Bihar falls under Barind Tract. The physiology of this area consists of alluvial soil, generally blackish brown in colour and composed of sand, clay and silt. The soils are loose and sandy throughout the district.” The Himalayan formations in the north end beyond the boundaries of this district. There are no hills/ mountains here. It has a large network of rivers flowing from north-west to south and south-east. The Teesta flows through Mekhliganj CD block before entering Bangladesh. The Jaldhaka and its connected river-streams form a large catchment area in the district. It virtually divides the district into two unequal parts and meets the Brahmaputra in Bangladesh. The Himalayan rivers flowing through Cooch Behar district change courses from time to time. In 1876, W.W. Hunter mentioned the Dharla and the Torsha as the same stream with two names. However, since the advent of the 20th century, these are two different streams meeting the Brahmaputra in Bangladesh.

The hill-streams of Cooch Behar carry debris and silt from the Himalayas and are shallow. During the monsoons the speed of flow of the rivers almost doubles and the rivers overflow the banks causing floods and devastation. The Singimari, Dharla and Baniadaha are the major rivers causing floods in the Dinhata I and II CD blocks.

The Dinhata II CD block is bounded by the Cooch Behar I CD block on the north, the Bhurungamari Upazila in Kurigram District of Bangladesh on the east, the Phulbari Upazila in Kurigram District of Bangladesh on the south and Dinhata I CD block on the west.

The Dinhata II CD block has an area of 246.98 km^{2}. It has 1 panchayat samity, 12 gram panchayats, 185 gram sansads (village councils), 119 mouzas and 119 inhabited villages. Dinhata police station serves this block. Headquarters of this CD block is at Sahebganj.

Gram panchayats of Dinhata II block/ panchayat samiti are: Bamanhat I, Bamanhat II, Bara Sakdal, Burirhat I, Burirhat II, Chowdhuryhat, Gobrachhara Nayarhat, Kismat Dasgram, Nazirhat I, Nazirhat II, Sahebganj and Sukrurkuthi.

Community development blocks in Cooch Behar district

== Demographics ==
=== Population ===
According to the 2011 Census of India, the Dinhata II CD block had a population of 244,066, all of which were rural. There were 126,633 (52%) males and 117,403 (48%) females. There were 29,659 persons in the age range of 0 to 6 years. The Scheduled Castes numbered 106,859 (43.78%) and the Scheduled Tribes numbered 1,237 (0.51%).

According to the 2001 census, Dinhata II block had a population of 205,391, out of which 104,443 were males and 100,948 were females. Dinhata II block registered a population growth of 9.4 per cent during the 1991-2001 decade.

Large villages (with 4,000+ population) in the Dinhata II CD block are (2011 census figures in brackets): Kismat Dasagram (6,841), Karala (4,600), Nadina (6,051), Bara Shakdal (8,035), Tiadaha (5,513), Sahebganj (6,304), Kalamati (9,882), Jaygir Balabari (4,701), Lauchapra (7,667), Patharsan (4,394), Sadialer Kuthi (4,057), Nagarerbari (6,695), Chanderkuthi (4,460), Shukarur Kuthi (5,945) and Tharaikhana (5,406).

Other villages in the Dinhata II CD block include (2011 census figures in brackets): Rakhalmari (3,843) and Kochabari (3,839).

=== Literacy ===
According to the 2011 census, the total number of literate persons in the Dinhata II CD block was 155,074 (72.33% of the population over 6 years) out of which males numbered 86,950 (78.09% of the male population over 6 years) and females numbered 68,124 (66.10% of the female population over 6 years). The gender disparity (the difference between female and male literacy rates) was 12.00%.

See also – List of West Bengal districts ranked by literacy rate

Literacy in CD blocks of
Cooch Behar district
Cooch Behar Sadar subdivision
Cooch Behar I – 76.56%
Cooch Behar II – 81.39%
Dinhata subdivision
Dinhata I – 73.23%
Dinhata II – 72.33%
Sitai – 62.79%
Mathabhanga subdivision
Sitalkuchi – 70.34%
Mathabhanga I – 71.51%
Mathabhanga II – 72.68%
Tufanganj subdivision
Tufanganj I – 73.69%
Tufanganj II – 75.75%
Mekhliganj subdivision
Mekhliganj – 69.34%
Haldibari – 69.22%
2011 Census: CD Block Wise

Primary Census Abstract Data

=== Language and religion ===
Religion in Dinhata II CD block (2011)
Hinduism	63.11%
Islam	36.68%
Other or not stated	0.21%

In the 2011 Census of India, Hindus numbered 154,042 and formed 63.11% of the population of Dinhata II CD block. Muslims numbered 89,530 and formed 36.68% of the population. Christians numbered 210 and formed 0.09% of the population. Others numbered 284 and formed 0.12% of the population.

Bengali is the predominant language, spoken by 98.69% of the population.

== Rural poverty ==
Based on a study of the per capita consumption in rural and urban areas, using central sample data of NSS 55th Round 1999–2000, Cooch Behar district had a rural poverty ratio of 25.62%.

According to a World Bank report, as of 2012, 20-26% of the population of Cooch Behar, Birbhum, Nadia and Hooghly districts were below poverty line, marginally higher than the level of poverty in West Bengal, which had an average 20% of the population below poverty line.

== Economy ==
=== Livelihood ===
Livelihood
in Dinhata II CD block
1. Cultivators (33.5%)
2. Agricultural labourers (51.1%)
3. Household industries (1.34%)
4. Other Workers (14.1%)

In the Dinhata II CD block in 2011, among the class of total workers, cultivators numbered 32,463 and formed 33.51%, agricultural labourers numbered 49,468 and formed 51.06%, household industry workers numbered 1,294 and formed 1.34% and other workers numbered 13,652 and formed 14.09%. Total workers numbered 96,877 and formed 39.69% of the total population, and non-workers numbered 147,189 and formed 60.31% of the population.

Note: In the census records a person is considered a cultivator, if the person is engaged in cultivation/ supervision of land owned by self/government/institution. When a person who works on another person's land for wages in cash or kind or share, is regarded as an agricultural labourer. Household industry is defined as an industry conducted by one or more members of the family within the household or village, and one that does not qualify for registration as a factory under the Factories Act. Other workers are persons engaged in some economic activity other than cultivators, agricultural labourers and household workers. It includes factory, mining, plantation, transport and office workers, those engaged in business and commerce, teachers, entertainment artistes and so on.

=== Infrastructure ===
There are 119 inhabited villages in the Dinhata II CD block, as per the District Census Handbook, Cooch Behar, 2011. 100% villages have power supply. 117 villages (98.32%) have drinking water supply. 29 villages (24.37%) have post offices. 98 villages (83.25%) have telephones (including landlines, public call offices and mobile phones). 53 villages (44.54%) have pucca (paved) approach roads and 25 villages (25.01%) have transport communication (includes bus service, rail facility and navigable waterways). 4 villages (3.36%) have agricultural credit societies and 17 villages (14.29%) have banks.

=== Agriculture ===
Agriculture is the primary mode of living in the district. The entire Cooch Behar district has fertile soil and around half of the cultivated land in the district is cropped twice or more. Paddy (rice) and jute are the largest producing crops, followed by potatoes, vegetables and pulses. There are 23 tea gardens on glided slopes. There are some coconut, areca nut and betel leaf plantations. 77.6% of the land holdings are marginal.

In 2012–13, there were 35 fertiliser depots, 1 seed store and 50 fair price shops in the Dinhata II CD block.

In 2012–13, the Dinhata II CD block produced 37,928 tonnes of Aman paddy, the main winter crop, from 18,715 hectares, 11,964 tonnes of Boro paddy (spring crop) from 4,048 hectares, 1,199 tonnes of wheat from 633 hectares, 295 tonnes of maize from 121 hectares, 117,481 tonnes of jute from 9,361 hectares and 71,631 tonnes of potatoes from 2,109 hectares. It also produced pulses and oilseeds.

In 2012–13, the total area irrigated in the Dinhata II CD block was 6,415 hectares, out of which 40 hectares were irrigated by private canal water, 40 hectares by tank water, 601 hectares by river lift irrigation, 238 hectares by deep tube wells, 4,254 hectares by shallow tube wells, 77 hectares by open dug wells, 1,165 hectares by other means.

=== Pisciculture ===
Being a river-bound district, pisciculture is an important economic activity in the Cooch Behar district. Almost all the rivers originating in the Himalayas have a lot of fish. The net area under effective pisciculture in 2010–11 in the Dinhata II CD block was 451.55 hectares. 18,525persons were engaged in the profession and approximate annual production was 23,697 quintals.

=== Banking ===
In 2012–13, Dinhata II CD block had offices of 9 commercial banks and 3 gramin banks.

== Transport ==
Dinhata II CD block has 5 originating/ terminating bus routes.

The terminus station of the broad gauge Alipurduar-Bamanhat branch line, Bamanhat railway station, is in this block.

== Education ==
In 2012–13, Dinhata II CD block had 171 primary schools with 11,082 students, 13 middle schools with 4,223 students, 11 high schools with 12,302 students and 9 higher secondary schools with 15,062 students. Dinhata II CD block had 435 institutions for special and non-formal education with 10,223 students. Dinhata municipal area has 1 general degree college with 3,492 students and 3 technical/ professional institutions with 295 students (outside the block).

See also – Education in India

According to the 2011 census, in the Dinhata II CD block, among the 119 inhabited villages, 4 villages did not have schools, 60 villages had two or more primary schools, 38 villages had at least 1 primary and 1 middle school and 20 villages had at least 1 middle and 1 secondary school.

== Healthcare ==
In 2013, Dinhata II CD block had 1 block primary health centre and 4 primary health centres with total 56 beds and 5 doctors (excluding private bodies). It had 36 family welfare subcentres. 7,396 patients were treated indoor and 54,075 patients were treated outdoor in the hospitals, health centres and subcentres of the CD block.

Bamanhat Rural Hospital, with 30 beds at Bamanhat, is the major government medical facility in the Dinhata II CD block. There are primary health centres at Kisamath (Dasgram) (with 4 beds), Tharaikhana (with 2 beds), Nayerhat (with 10 beds) and Najirkhana (with 6 beds).
