= Haripur =

Haripur can refer to:

== Bangladesh ==
- Haripur, Bangladesh

== India ==
- Haripur or Haripuram, a village in Srikakulam district, Andhra Pradesh
- Haripur, Bardhaman, a town in Bardhaman district, West Bengal
- Haripur, Chanditala-I, a village in Hooghly district, West Bengal
- Haripur, Cooch Behar, a village in Cooch Behar district, West Bengal
- Haripur, Bhopal, a village in Madhya Pradesh
- Mahua Dabra Haripura, Uttarakhand
- Haripur, Raebareli, a village in Raebareli district, Uttar Pradesh
- Haripur, historical site of Mayurbhanj, Odisha

== Nepal ==
- Haripur, Sarlahi
- Haripur, Sunsari
- Haripur, Saptari

== Pakistan ==
- Haripur District, a district
- Haripur, Pakistan, a city
