= Baikunthpur =

Baikunthpur or Baikunthapur may refer to several places in India:

- Baikunthpur, Chhattisgarh
  - Baikunthpur, Chhattisgarh Assembly constituency
- Baikunthpur, Madhya Pradesh
- Baikunthapur, Cooch Behar district, West Bengal, India
- Baikunthapur, Paschim Medinipur, West Bengal, India
- Baikunthpur, Gopalganj district, India, in Bihar
  - Baikunthpur, Bihar Assembly constituency

== See also ==
- Baikunthpur Assembly constituency (disambiguation)
- Vaikuntha, or Vishnuloka, the abode of Vishnu in Hinduism
