= Cooch Behar II =

- Community development block
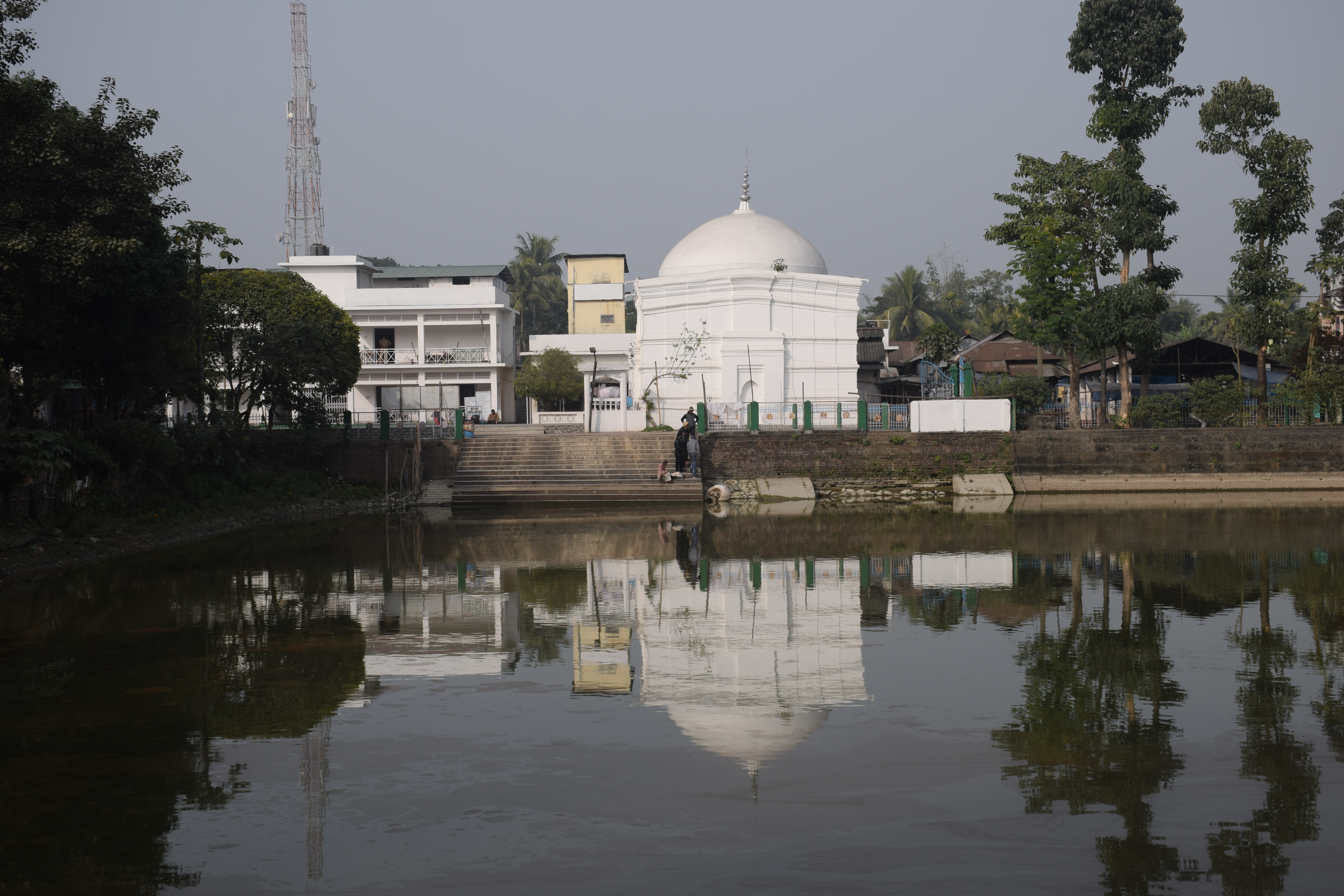
- Baneswar Shiva temple

- Coordinates: 26.36°N 89.46°E
- Country: India
- State: West Bengal
- District: Cooch Behar

Government
  - Type: Representative democracy

Area
  - Total: 385.38 km^{2} (148.80 sq mi)

Population (2011)
  - Total: 343,901
  - Density: 892.37/km^{2} (2,311.2/sq mi)

Languages
  - Official: Bengali, English
- Time zone: UTC+5:30 (IST)
- Lok Sabha constituency: Cooch Behar
- Vidhan Sabha constituency: Cooch Behar Uttar
- Website: coochbehar.gov.in

Cooch Behar II is a community development block (CD block) that forms an administrative division in the Cooch Behar Sadar subdivision of the Cooch Behar district in the Indian state of West Bengal.

== Geography ==
Khagrabari, one of the constituent panchayats of the block, is located at 26°22′N 89°28′E.

Topographically Cooch Behar district is generally plain land which is low and marshy at some places. “Considering the nature of general surface configuration, relief and drainage pattern, distribution of different types of soil, climatic condition, the formation of geology and forest tracts, the district Koch Bihar falls under Barind Tract. The physiology of this area consists of alluvial soil, generally blackish brown in colour and composed of sand, clay and silt. The soils are loose and sandy throughout the district.” The Himalayan formations in the north end beyond the boundaries of this district. There are no hills/ mountains here. It has a large network of rivers flowing from north-west to south and south-east. The Teesta flows through Mekhliganj CD block before entering Bangladesh. The Jaldhaka and its connected river-streams form a large catchment area in the district. It virtually divides the district into two unequal parts and meets the Brahmaputra in Bangladesh. The Himalayan rivers flowing through Cooch Behar district change courses from time to time. In 1876, W.W. Hunter mentioned the Dharla and the Torsha as the same stream with two names. However, since the advent of the 20th century, these are two different streams meeting the Brahmaputra in Bangladesh.

The hill-streams of Cooch Behar carry debris and silt from the Himalayas and are shallow. During the monsoons the speed of flow of the rivers almost doubles and the rivers overflow the banks causing floods and devastation. The Raidak I and II, Gadadhar, Kaljani, Torsha and Ghargharia are the major rivers causing floods in the Cooch Behar I and II CD blocks.

The Cooch Behar II CD block is bounded by the Falakata and Alipurduar I CD blocks in Alipurduar district on the north, the Tufanganj I CD block on the east, the Cooch Behar I CD block on the south, the Mathabhanga II CD block on the west.

The Cooch Behar II CD block has an area of 385.38 km^{2}. It has 1 panchayat samity, 13 gram panchayats, 257 gram sansads (village councils), 115 mouzas, 111 inhabited villages and 5 census towns. Cooch Behar police station serves this block. Headquarters of this CD block is at Kalarayerkuthi.

Community development blocks in Cooch Behar district

Gram panchayats of Cooch Behar II block/ panchayat samiti are: Ambari, Baneswar, Bararangras, Chakchaka, Dhandhingguri, Gopalpur, Khagrabari, Khapaidanga, Madhupur, Marichbari Kholta, Patlakhawa, Pundibari and Takagachh Rajarhat.

== Demographics ==
=== Population ===
According to the 2011 Census of India, the Cooch Behar II CD block had a total population of 343,901, of which 289,917 were rural and 53,984 were urban. There were 179,591 (52%) males and 164,310 (48%) females. There were 38,828 persons in the age range of 0 to 6 years. The Scheduled Castes numbered 154,656 (44.97%) and the Scheduled Tribes numbered 3,429 (1.00%).

According to the 2001 census, Cooch Behar II block had a total population of 298,163, out of which 154,011 were males and 144,152 were females. Cooch Behar II block registered a population growth of 16.06 per cent during the 1991-2001 decade.

Census towns in the Cooch Behar II CD block are (2011 census figures in brackets. Baneswar (4,841), Khagrabari (23,122), Baisguri (5,021), Chakchaka (8,582) and Takagachh (12,414) .

Large villages (with 4,000+ population) in the Cooch Behar II CD block are (2011 census figures in brackets): Basdaha Natibari (4,385), Sajherpar Ghoramara (5,844), Khagribari (6,226), Singimari Paschimpar (4,545), Chhat Singimari (4,432), Sakunibala (5,751), Kalarayerkuthi (20,739), Bararangras (8,049), Gopalpur (18,297), Marichbari (13,370), Kholta (14,110), Ambari (8,926), Kaljani (9,887), Kalapani (5,480), Kaminirghat (4,688), Mahishbathan Pratham Khanda (4,840), Sidheswari (4,467), Pestharjhar (5,536) and Khapaidanga (9,839).

Other villages in the Cooch Behar II CD block include (2011 census figures in brackets): Haripur (995), Baikunthapur (1,053).

=== Literacy ===
According to the 2011 census, the total number of literate persons in the Cooch Behar II CD block was 248,311 (81.39% of the population over 6 years) out of which males numbered 138,097 (86.43% of the male population over 6 years) and females numbered 110,214 (75.85% of the female population over 6 years). The gender disparity (the difference between female and male literacy rates) was 10.58%.

See also – List of West Bengal districts ranked by literacy rate

Literacy in CD blocks of
Cooch Behar district
Cooch Behar Sadar subdivision
Cooch Behar I – 76.56%
Cooch Behar II – 81.39%
Dinhata subdivision
Dinhata I – 73.23%
Dinhata II – 72.33%
Sitai – 62.79%
Mathabhanga subdivision
Sitalkuchi – 70.34%
Mathabhanga I – 71.51%
Mathabhanga II – 72.68%
Tufanganj subdivision
Tufanganj I – 73.69%
Tufanganj II – 75.75%
Mekhliganj subdivision
Mekhliganj – 69.34%
Haldibari – 69.22%
2011 Census: CD Block Wise

Primary Census Abstract Data

=== Language and religion ===
Religion in Cooch Behar II CD block (2011)
Hinduism	81.85%
Islam	17.64%
Other or not stated	0.51%

In the 2011 Census of India, Hindus numbered 281,472 and formed 81.85% of the population of Cooch Behar II CD block. Muslims numbered 60,658 and formed 17.64% of the population. Christians numbered 608 and formed 0.18% of the population. Others numbered 1,163 and formed 0.34% of the population.

Languages of Cooch Behar II CD block (2011)
1. Bengali (93.9%)
2. 'Other' Bengali (1.92%)
3. Hindi (1.85%)
4. Rajbongshi (1.23%)
5. Others (1.06%)

At the time of the 2011 census, 93.49% of the population spoke Bengali, 1.85% Hindi and 1.23% Rajbongshi as their first language. 1.92% were recorded as speaking 'Other' under Bengali.

== Rural poverty ==
Based on a study of the per capita consumption in rural and urban areas, using central sample data of NSS 55th Round 1999–2000, Cooch Behar district had a rural poverty ratio of 25.62%.

According to a World Bank report, as of 2012, 20-26% of the population of Cooch Behar, Birbhum, Nadia and Hooghly districts were below poverty line, marginally higher than the level of poverty in West Bengal, which had an average 20% of the population below poverty line.

== Economy ==
=== Livelihood ===
Livelihood
in Cooch Behar II CD block
1. Cultivators (21.4%)
2. Agricultural labourers (33.8%)
3. Household industries (3.04%)
4. Other Workers (41.9%)

In the Cooch Behar II CD block in 2011, among the class of total workers, cultivators numbered 27,400 and formed 21.35%, agricultural labourers numbered 43,329 and formed 33.77%, household industry workers numbered 3,895 and formed 3.04% and other workers numbered 53,699 and formed 41.85%. Total workers numbered 128,323 and formed 37.31% of the total population, and non-workers numbered 215,578 and formed 62.69% of the population.

Note: In the census records a person is considered a cultivator, if the person is engaged in cultivation/ supervision of land owned by self/government/institution. When a person who works on another person's land for wages in cash or kind or share, is regarded as an agricultural labourer. Household industry is defined as an industry conducted by one or more members of the family within the household or village, and one that does not qualify for registration as a factory under the Factories Act. Other workers are persons engaged in some economic activity other than cultivators, agricultural labourers and household workers. It includes factory, mining, plantation, transport and office workers, those engaged in business and commerce, teachers, entertainment artistes and so on.

=== Infrastructure ===
There are 111 inhabited villages in the Cooch Behar II CD block, as per the District Census Handbook, Cooch Behar, 2011. All the villages have power supply and drinking water supply. 27 villages (24.32%) have post offices. 84 villages (75.68%) have telephones (including landlines, public call offices and mobile phones). 55 villages (49.55%) have pucca (paved) approach roads and 29 villages (26.13%) have transport communication (includes bus service, rail facility and navigable waterways). 11 villages (9.91%) have agricultural credit societies and 7 villages (6.31%) have banks.

=== Agriculture ===
Agriculture is the primary mode of living in the district. The entire Cooch Behar district has fertile soil and around half of the cultivated land in the district is cropped twice or more. Paddy (rice) and jute are the largest producing crops, followed by potatoes, vegetables and pulses. There are 23 tea gardens on glided slopes. There are some coconut, areca nut and betel leaf plantations. 77.6% of the land holdings are marginal.

In 2012–13, there were 120 fertiliser depots, 1 seed store and 75 fair price shops in the Cooch Behar II CD block.

In 2012–13, the Cooch Behar II CD block produced 55,399 tonnes of Aman paddy, the main winter crop, from 24,464 hectares, 540 tonnes of Boro paddy (spring crop) from 274 hectares, 810 tonnes of Aus paddy (summer crop) from 428 hectares, 486 tonnes of wheat from 227 hectares, 80 tonnes of maize from 33 hectares, 80,756 tonnes of jute from 6,476 hectares and 89,263 tonnes of potatoes from 3,097 hectares. It also produced pulses and oilseeds.

In 2012–13, the total area irrigated in the Cooch Behar II CD block was 6,575 hectares, out of which 55 hectares were irrigated by private canal water, 1,640 hectares by tank water, 899 hectares by river lift irrigation, 230 hectares by deep tube wells, 2,520 hectares by shallow tube wells, 111 hectares by open dug wells, 1,120 hectares by other means.

=== Pisciculture ===
Being a river-bound district, pisciculture is an important economic activity in the Cooch Behar district. Almost all the rivers originating in the Himalayas have a lot of fish. The net area under effective pisciculture in 2010–11 in the Cooch Behar II CD block was 290.50 hectares. 17,863 persons were engaged in the profession and approximate annual production was 17,345 quintals.

=== Banking ===
In 2012–13, Cooch Behar II CD block had offices of 9 commercial banks and 8 gramin banks.

== Transport ==
Cooch Behar II CD block has 4 ferry services and 7 originating/ terminating bus routes.

The New Jalpaiguri–New Bongaigaon section of the Barauni–Guwahati line passes through this block and there are stations at New Baneswar, Pundibari and Sajerpar.

The New Mal-Changrabandha-New Cooch Behar line passes through this block and there is a station at Chapaguri.

The Alipurduar-Bamanhat branch line passes through this block and there is a station at Baneswar.

== Education ==
In 2012–13, Cooch Behar II CD block had 210 primary schools with 25,009 students, 18 middle schools with 6,350 students, 11 high schools with 14,726 students and 22 higher secondary schools with 24,754 students. Cooch Behar II CD block had 1 general degree college with 386 students, 5 technical/ professional institutions with 974 students and 529 institutions for special and non-formal education with 27,892 students.

See also – Education in India

According to the 2011 census, in the Cooch Behar II CD block, among the 111 inhabited villages, 3 villages did not have schools, 58 villages had two or more primary schools, 48 villages had at least 1 primary and 1 middle school and 22 villages had at least 1 middle and 1 secondary school.

Uttar Banga Krishi Vishwavidyalaya initially started functioning as a satellite campus of Bidhan Chandra Krishi Vishwavidyalaya and was formally established in 2001 at Pundibari.

Baneswar Sarathibala Mahavidyalaya was established at Baneswar in 2009.

== Culture ==
The Cooch Behar II CD block has several heritage temples.

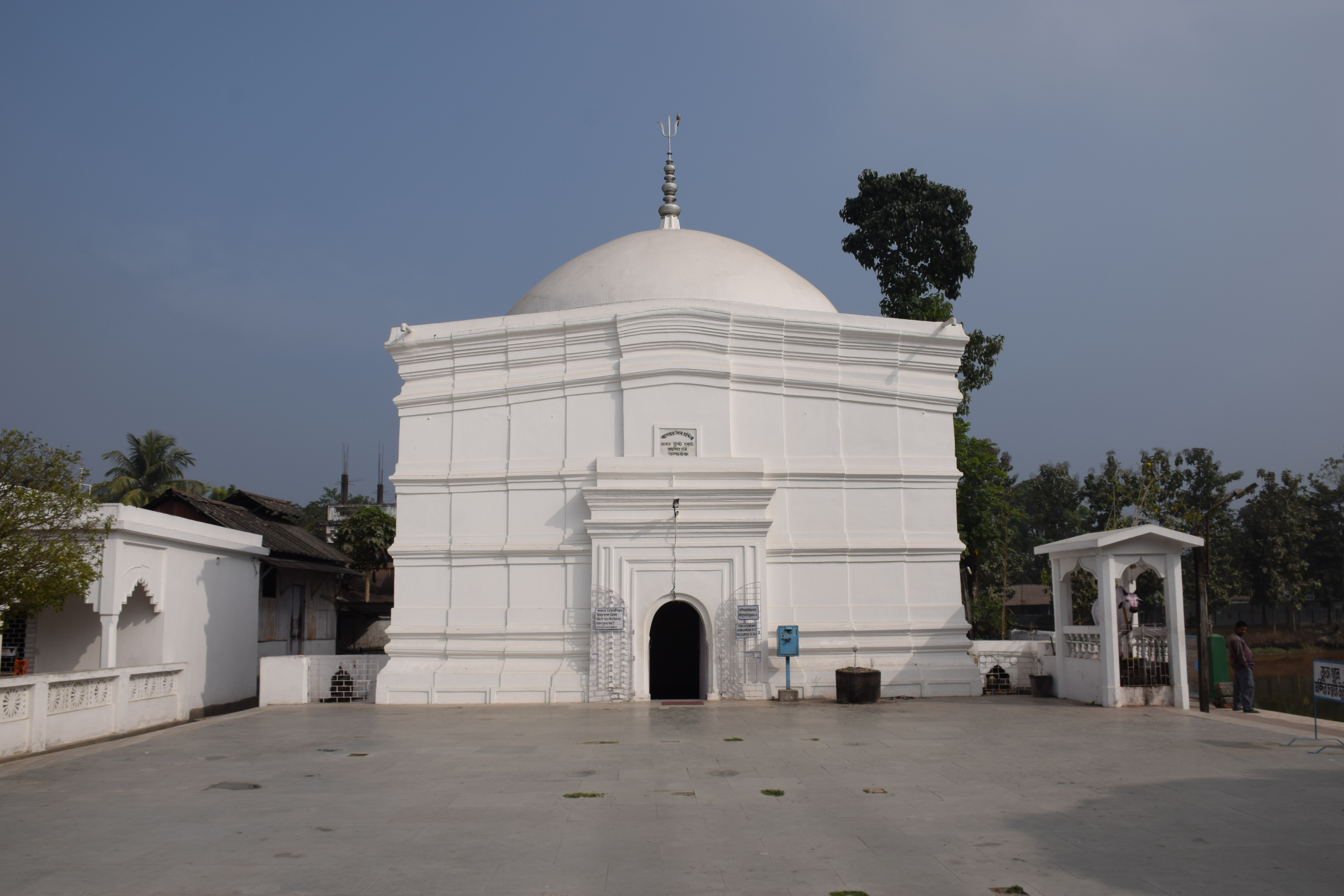
Baneswar: Baneswar Shiva temple, squarish with dome, is believed to have been built in ancient times

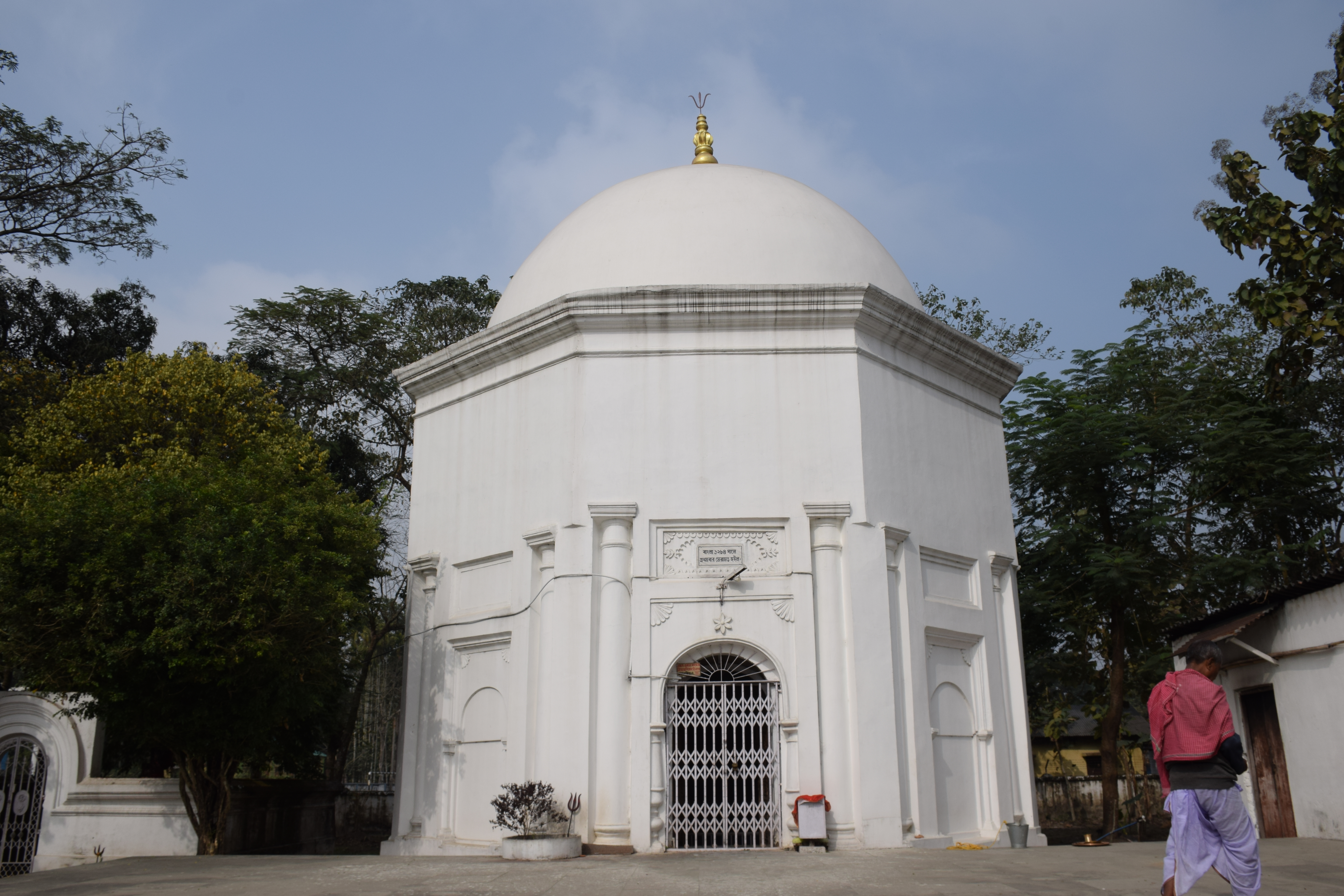
Sidheswari: Unusual octagonal temple of Siddheswari Devi, built in end 19th-early 20th century

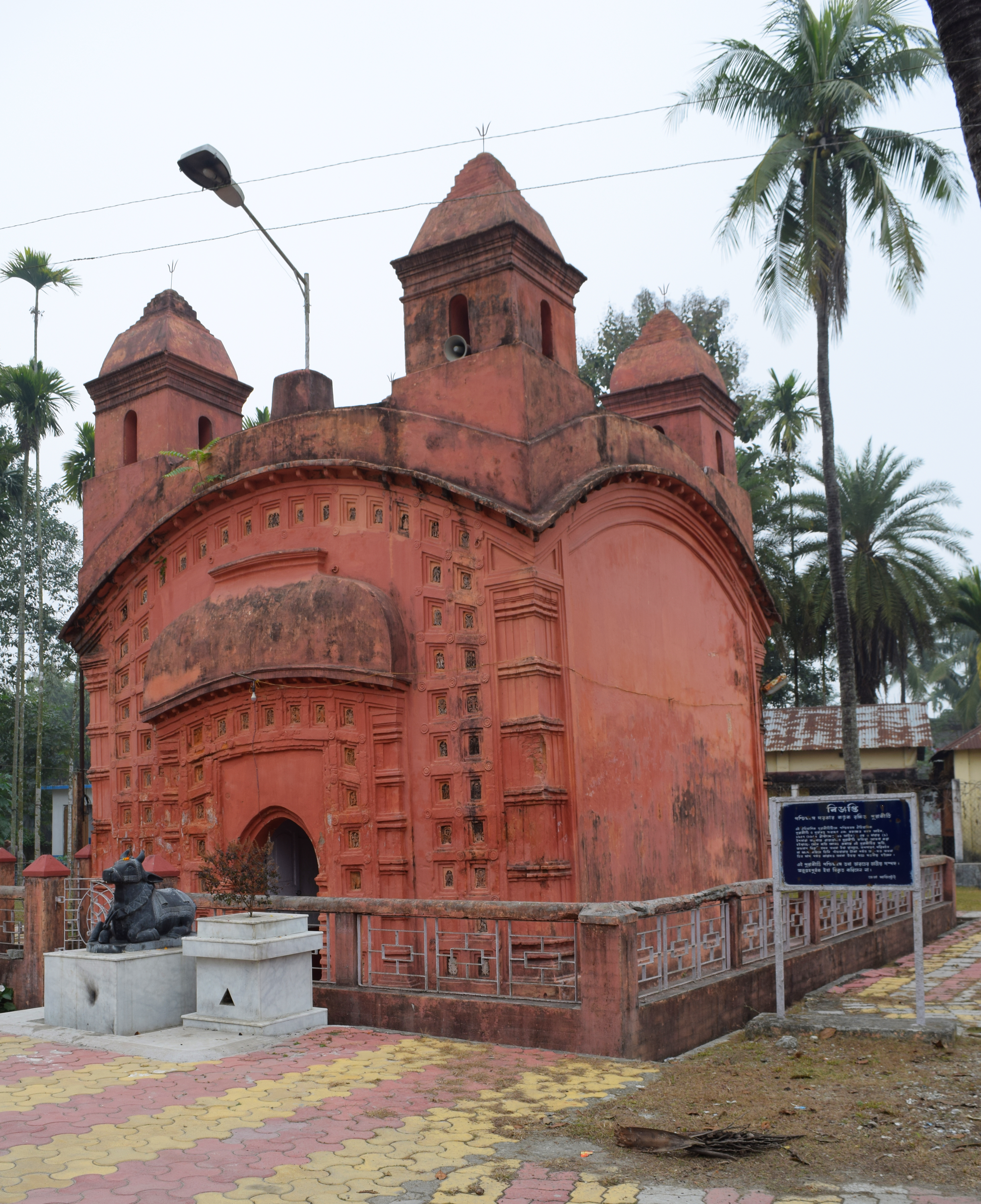
Dhaliabari: Siddheswari Shiva temple, rare North Bengal temple with terracotta work

== Healthcare ==
In 2013, Cooch Behar II CD block had 1 hospital, 1 block primary health centre, 5 primary health centres, 1 institution other than Health Department, 1 central government institution and 2 NGO/private nursing homes with total 228 beds and 16 doctors (excluding private bodies). It had 52 family welfare subcentres. 10,176 patients were treated indoor and 80,409 patients were treated outdoor in the hospitals, health centres and subcentres of the CD block.

Pundibari Rural Hospital, with 30 beds at Pundibari, is the major government medical facility in the Cooch Behar II CD block. There are primary health centres at Patlakhawa (with 6 beds), Bokalir Math (with 4 beds), Gopalpur (with 10 beds) and Kaljani (with 4 beds)
