= Suktabari =

Suktabari (Bengali: সুকটাবাড়ি) is a Gram panchayat in the Cooch Behar I (community development block) of Cooch Behar Sadar subdivision of Cooch Behar district in West Bengal state, India.

== Education ==
- Suktabari Ekramia High Madrasah
- Suktabari State High Madrasah

== See also ==
- Dudher Kuthi Dewan Bosh
- Suktabari Ekramia High Madrasah
- Suktabari State High Madrasah
