= Gudam Maharaniganj =

- Village
- Location in West Bengal, India Gudam Maharaniganj (India)
- Coordinates: 26.2911°N 89.4528°E
- Country: India
- State: West Bengal
- District: Cooch Behar

Population (2011)
  - Total: 1,639
- Time zone: UTC+5:30 (IST)
- PIN: 736170
- Telephone/STD code: 03582
- Vehicle registration: WB
- Lok Sabha constituency: Cooch Behar
- Vidhan Sabha constituency: Cooch Behar Dakshin
- Website: coochbehar.gov.in

Gudam Maharaniganj is a village in the Cooch Behar I CD block in the Cooch Behar Sadar subdivision of the Cooch Behar district in West Bengal, India

== Geography ==
Places in the Cooch Behar Sadar subdivision in Cooch Behar district
CT: census town, M: municipal town, R: rural/ urban centre, H: historical/ religious centre
Owing to space constraints in the small map, the actual locations in a larger map may vary slightly

=== Location ===
Gudam Maharaniganj is located at 26.2911°N 89.4528°E.

=== Area overview ===
The map alongside shows the north-central part of the district. It has the highest level of urbanisation in an overwhelming rural district. 22.08% of the population of the Cooch Behar Sadar subdivision lives in the urban areas and 77.92% lives in the rural areas. The entire district forms the flat alluvial flood plains of mighty rivers.

Note: The map alongside presents some of the notable locations in the subdivision. All places marked in the map are linked in the larger full screen map.

== Demographics ==
As per the 2011 Census of India, Gudam Maharaniganj had a total population of 1,639. There were 836 (51%) males and 803 (49%) females. There were 167 persons in the age range of 0 to 6 years. The total number of literate people in Gudam Maharaniganj was 1,137 (77.24% of the population over 6 years).

== Culture ==
The mazar named Torsha Pirdham and a mosque here are famous.

A Pir used to be engaged in religious activities in the early years of the 18th century on the banks of the Torsha River near where the railway bridge now stands. He is said to have certain supernatural powers. It is said that Maharaja Harendra Narayan of the Cooch Behar State was an admirer of his but the Torsha Pir did not show any special respect for him. The Maharaja donated around 7 bighas of land for the upkeep of the place where the Torsha Pir lived. Attracted by him, many people converted to Islam. There now is a mazar at the place.
