= Baikunthapur =

- Village
- Location in West Bengal, India Baikunthapur (India)
- Coordinates: 26.36973°N 89.49972°E
- Country: India
- State: West Bengal
- District: Cooch Behar

Population (2011)
  - Total: 1,053
- Time zone: UTC+5:30 (IST)
- PIN: 736156
- Telephone/STD code: 03582
- Vehicle registration: WB
- Lok Sabha constituency: Cooch Behar
- Vidhan Sabha constituency: Cooch Behar Uttar
- Website: coochbehar.gov.in

Baikunthapur is a village in the Cooch Behar II CD block in the Cooch Behar Sadar subdivision of the Cooch Behar district in West Bengal, India.

== Geography ==
Places in the Cooch Behar Sadar subdivision in Cooch Behar district
CT: census town, M: municipal town, R: rural/ urban centre, H: historical/ religious centre
Owing to space constraints in the small map, the actual locations in a larger map may vary slightly

=== Location ===
Baikunthapur is located at 26.36973°N 89.49972°E.

Baikunthapur is 4 kilometres (2.5 mi) south-east of Sidheswari village.

=== Area overview ===
The map alongside shows the north-central part of the district. It has the highest level of urbanisation in an overwhelming rural district. 22.08% of the population of the Cooch Behar Sadar subdivision lives in the urban areas and 77.92% lives in the rural areas. The entire district forms the flat alluvial flood plains of mighty rivers.

Note: The map alongside presents some of the notable locations in the subdivision. All places marked in the map are linked in the larger full screen map.

== Demographics ==
As per the 2011 Census of India, Baikunthapur had a total population of 1,053. There were 549 (52%) males and 504 (48%) females. There were 118 persons in the age range of 0 to 6 years. The total number of literate people in Haripur was 795 (85.03% of the population over 6 years).

== Culture ==
The temple of Baikunthanth is situated around the place where the Damodardebdham once stood. It is a simple tin-roofed temple. There are ashtadhatu idols of Krishna and Balarama in the temple. The village was once home to many noble men.
