= Ghughumari =

- Village
- Location in West Bengal, India Ghughumari (India)
- Coordinates: 26.285752°N 89.470259°E
- Country: India
- State: West Bengal
- District: Cooch Behar

Population (2011)
  - Total: 13,764
- Time zone: UTC+5:30 (IST)
- PIN: 736170
- Telephone/STD code: 03582
- Vehicle registration: WB
- Lok Sabha constituency: Cooch Behar
- Vidhan Sabha constituency: Cooch Behar Dakshin
- Website: coochbehar.gov.in

Ghughumari is a village and a gram panchayat in the Cooch Behar I CD block in the Cooch Behar Sadar subdivision of the Cooch Behar district in the state of West Bengal, India.

== Geography ==
Places in the Cooch Behar Sadar subdivision in Cooch Behar district
CT: census town, M: municipal town, R: rural/ urban centre, H: historical/ religious centre
Owing to space constraints in the small map, the actual locations in a larger map may vary slightly

=== Location ===
Ghughumari is located at 26.285752°N 89.470259°E.

=== Area overview ===
The map alongside shows the north-central part of the district. It has the highest level of urbanisation in an overwhelming rural district. 22.08% of the population of the Cooch Behar Sadar subdivision lives in the urban areas and 77.92% lives in the rural areas. The district forms the flat alluvial flood plains of mighty rivers.

Note: The map alongside presents some of the notable locations in the subdivision. All places marked in the map are linked in the larger full screen map.

== Civic administration ==
The headquarters of the Cooch Behar I CD block are located at Ghughumari.

== Demographics ==
As per the 2011 Census of India, Ghughumari had a total population of 13,764. There were 7,019 (51%) males and 6,745 (49%) females. There were 1,704 persons in the age range of 0 to 6 years. The total number of literate people in Ghughumari was 9,146 (75.84% of the population over 6 years).

== Handicrafts ==
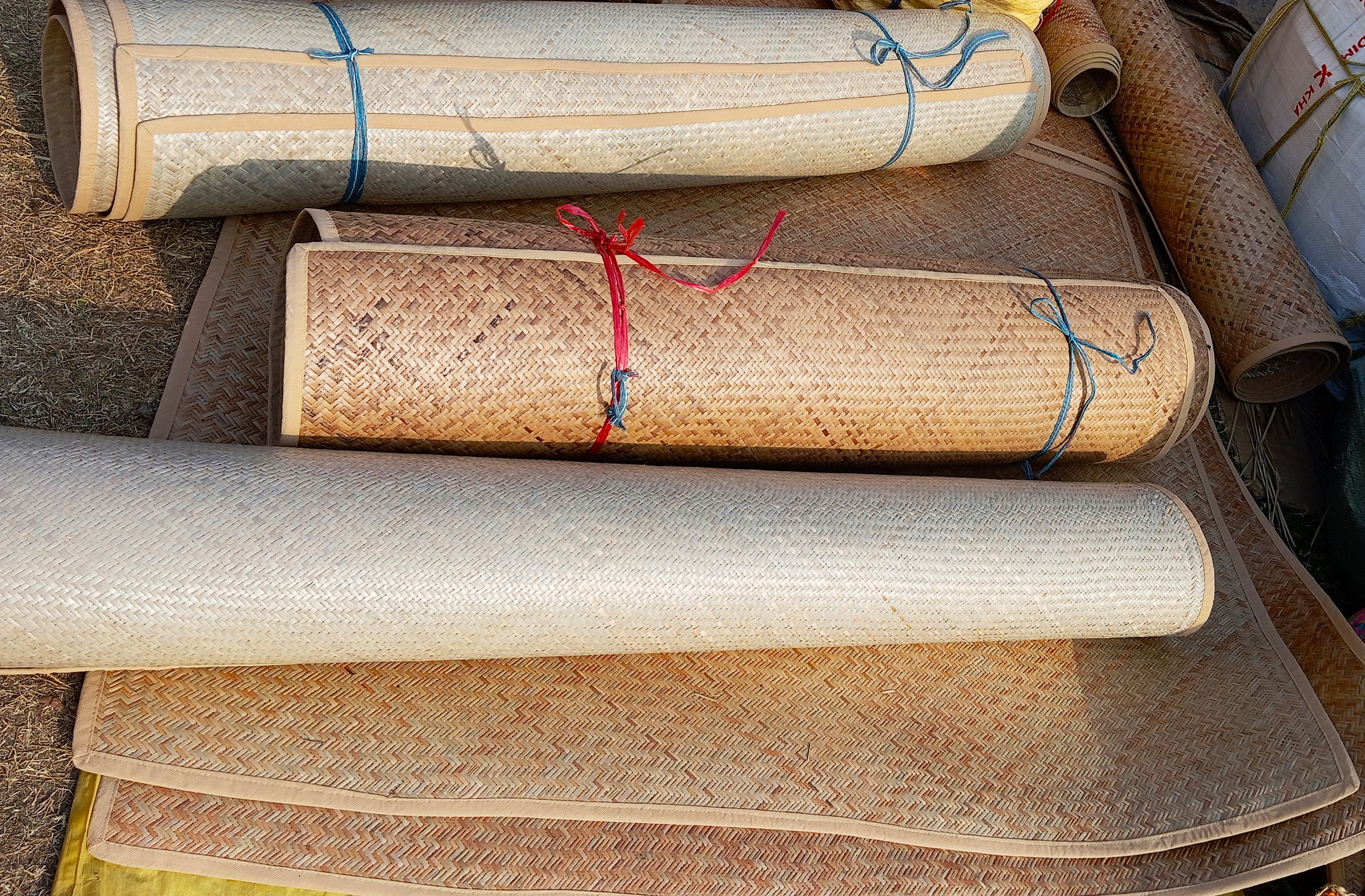
Shital Pati from Ghughumari, Cooch Behar, West Bengal.

There are about 14,000 families weaving pati or sitalpati in and around Ghughumari. After the partition of Bengal in 1947, a number of families migrated from Tangail, now in Bangladesh, and settled in this area. They brought the age-old tradition of weaving pati and that helped them survive. Generally, men are engaged in growing the plants and extracting the fibre, and the women are engaged in weaving.
