= Haripur, Cooch Behar =

Haripur
- Village
- Location in West Bengal, India Haripur (India)
- Coordinates: 26.36873°N 89.36792°E
- Country: India
- State: West Bengal
- District: Cooch Behar

Population (2011)
  - Total: 995
- Time zone: UTC+5:30 (IST)
- PIN: 736165
- Telephone/STD code: 03582
- Vehicle registration: WB
- Lok Sabha constituency: Cooch Behar
- Vidhan Sabha constituency: Cooch Behar Uttar
- Website: coochbehar.gov.in

Haripur is a village in the Cooch Behar II CD block in the Cooch Behar Sadar subdivision of the Cooch Behar district in West Bengal, India

== Geography ==
Places in the Cooch Behar Sadar subdivision in Cooch Behar district
CT: census town, M: municipal town, R: rural/ urban centre, H: historical/ religious centre
Owing to space constraints in the small map, the actual locations in a larger map may vary slightly

=== Location ===
Haripur is located at 26.36873°N 89.36792°E.

Haripur is 1.6 kilometres (0.99 mi) west of Madhupur Satra and is on the banks of the Torsha River.

=== Area overview ===
The map alongside shows the north-central part of the district. It has the highest level of urbanisation in an overwhelming rural district. 22.08% of the population of the Cooch Behar Sadar subdivision lives in the urban areas and 77.92% lives in the rural areas. The entire district forms the flat alluvial flood plains of mighty rivers.

Note: The map alongside presents some of the notable locations in the subdivision. All places marked in the map are linked in the larger full screen map.

== Demographics ==
As per the 2011 Census of India, Haripur had a total population of 995. There were 523 (53%) males and 472 (47%) females. There were 119 persons in the age range of 0 to 6 years. The total number of literate people in Haripur was 667 (76.14% of the population over 6 years).

== Culture ==
The Harihar Mahadev temple is a squarish brick-built structure, that has sunk considerably because of an earthquake. Devotees have to descend 8 ft, stepping over 8 stairs to reach the Shiva linga in the garbhagriha or the sanctum sanctorum of the temple. A tin shed has been built over the entrance door to prevent rainwater from entering the temple. The temple now measures 4.6 metres (15 ft) in height. The original height must have been around 7.8 metres (26 ft). The temple is a 5 metres (16 ft) square. The temple is estimated to have been built in the 18th century by the Cooch Behar State rulers. There are some stone decorations in the walls, which seem to be of an earlier period, but these may have been brought from other temples.
