= Pundibari =

- Village
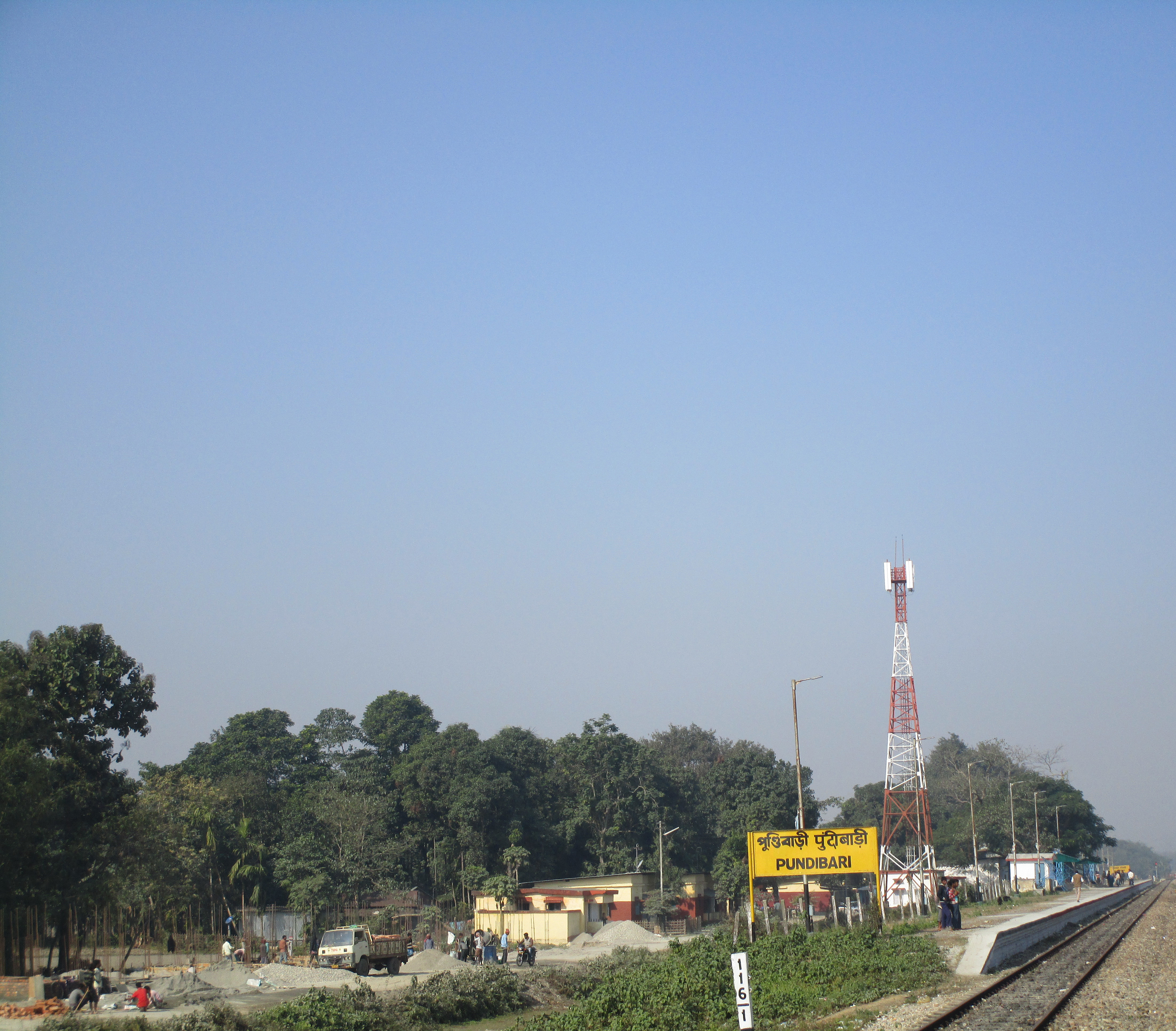
- Pundibari Station Nameplate

- Location in West Bengal, India Pundibari (India) Pundibari (Asia)
- Coordinates: 26.408888°N 89.382372°E
- Country: India
- State: West Bengal
- District: Cooch Behar

Languages
  - Official: Bengali
  - Additional official: English
- Time zone: UTC+5:30 (IST)
- PIN: 736165
- Vehicle registration: WB
- Nearest city: coochbehar
- Website: coochbehar.nic.in

Pundibari is a village in the Cooch Behar II CD block in the Cooch Behar Sadar subdivision of the Cooch Behar district of West Bengal, India.

== Geography ==
Places in the Cooch Behar Sadar subdivision in Cooch Behar district
CT: census town, M: municipal town, R: rural/ urban centre, H: historical/ religious centre
Owing to space constraints in the small map, the actual locations in a larger map may vary slightly

=== Location ===
Pundibari is located at 26.408890°N 89.382388°E. It is the headquarters of Cooch Behar–II Community Development Block under Cooch Behar Sadar subdivision of the district.

=== Area overview ===
The map alongside shows the north-central part of the district. It has the highest level of urbanisation in an overwhelming rural district. 22.08% of the population of the Cooch Behar Sadar subdivision lives in the urban areas and 77.92% lives in the rural areas. The entire district forms the flat alluvial flood plains of mighty rivers.

Note: The map alongside presents some of the notable locations in the subdivision. All places marked in the map are linked in the larger full screen map.

== Civic administration ==
=== Police station ===
There is a police station at Pundibari.

== Transport ==
The Pundibari railway station is on the New Jalpaiguri–New Bongaigaon section of the Barauni–Guwahati line.

== Education ==
Uttar Banga Krishi Vishwavidyalaya initially started functioning as a satellite campus of Bidhan Chandra Krishi Vishwavidyalaya and was formally established in 2001.

== Healthcare ==
Pundibari Rural Hospital, with 30 beds at Pundibari, is the major government medical facility in the Cooch Behar II CD block.
