= Baikunthpur Assembly constituency =

Baikunthpur Assembly constituency may refer to:

- Baikunthpur, Bihar Assembly constituency, an assembly constituency in Gopalganj district in the state of Bihar
- Baikunthpur, Chhattisgarh Assembly constituency

== See also ==
- Baikunthpur (disambiguation)
