= Chakchaka =

- Census Town
- Location in West Bengal, India Chakchaka (India)
- Coordinates: 26.3327°N 89.4789°E
- Country: India
- State: West Bengal
- District: Cooch Behar

Area
  - Total: 4.4936 km^{2} (1.7350 sq mi)

Population (2011)
  - Total: 8,582
  - Density: 1,910/km^{2} (4,946/sq mi)
- Time zone: UTC+5:30 (IST)
- PIN: 736156
- Telephone/STD code: 03582
- Vehicle registration: WB
- Lok Sabha constituency: Cooch Behar
- Vidhan Sabha constituency: Cooch Behar Dakshin
- Website: coochbehar.gov.in

Chakchaka is a census town and gram panchayat in the Cooch Behar II CD block in the Cooch Behar Sadar subdivision of the Cooch Behar district in the state of West Bengal, India.

== Geography ==
Places in the Cooch Behar Sadar subdivision in Cooch Behar district
CT: census town, M: municipal town, R: rural/ urban centre, H: historical/ religious centre
Owing to space constraints in the small map, the actual locations in a larger map may vary slightly

=== Location ===
Chakchaka is located at 26.3327°N 89.4789°E.

=== Area overview ===
The map alongside shows the north-central part of the district. It has the highest level of urbanisation in an overwhelming rural district. 22.08% of the population of the Cooch Behar Sadar subdivision lives in the urban areas and 77.92% lives in the rural areas. The entire district forms the flat alluvial flood plains of mighty rivers.

Note: The map alongside presents some of the notable locations in the subdivision. All places marked in the map are linked in the larger full screen map.

== Demographics ==
As per the 2011 Census of India, Chakchaka had a total population of 8,582. There were 4,426 (52%) males and 4,156 (48%) females. There were 769 persons in the age range of 0 to 6 years. The total number of literate people in Chakchaka was 7,051 (90.25% of the population over 6 years).

== Infrastructure ==
According to the District Census Handbook 2011, Koch Bihar, Chakchaka covered an area of 4.4936 km^{2}. Among the civic amenities, the protected water supply involved overhead tank, tap water from treated sources and hand pumps. It had 826 electric connections. Among the medical facilities, it had 2 maternity and child welfare centres, 1 charitable hospital/ nursing home. Among the educational facilities, it had 6 primary schools, 1 middle school, 1 secondary school, the nearest general degree college is at Cooch Behar 4 km away.
