= Kharimala Khagrabari =

- Census Town
- Location in West Bengal, India Kharimala Khagrabari (India) Kharimala Khagrabari (Asia)
- Coordinates: 26.3248°N 89.48475°E
- Country: India
- State: West Bengal
- District: Cooch Behar

Area
  - Total: 3.8 km^{2} (1.5 sq mi)

Population (2011)
  - Total: 7,844
  - Density: 2,100/km^{2} (5,300/sq mi)

Languages
  - Official: Bengali
  - Additional official: English
- Time zone: UTC+5:30 (IST)
- Vehicle registration: WB
- Website: coochbehar.nic.in

Kharimala Khagrabari is a census town in the Cooch Behar I CD block in the Cooch Behar Sadar subdivision of the Cooch Behar district in the Indian state of West Bengal.

== Geography ==
Places in the Cooch Behar Sadar subdivision in Cooch Behar district
CT: census town, M: municipal town, R: rural/ urban centre, H: historical/ religious centre
Owing to space constraints in the small map, the actual locations in a larger map may vary slightly

=== Location ===
Kharimala Khagrabari is located at 26.3248°N 89.48475°E.

=== Area overview ===
The map alongside shows the north-central part of the district. It has the highest level of urbanisation in an overwhelming rural district. 22.08% of the population of the Cooch Behar Sadar subdivision lives in the urban areas and 77.92% lives in the rural areas. The entire district forms the flat alluvial flood plains of mighty rivers.

Note: The map alongside presents some of the notable locations in the subdivision. All places marked in the map are linked in the larger full screen map.

== Demographics ==
As per the 2011 Census of India, Kharimala Khagrabari had a total population of 7,844. There were 3,936 (50%) males and 3,906 (50%) females. There were 666 persons in the age range of 0 to 6 years. The total number of literate people in Kharimala Khagribari was 6,461 (90.01% of the population over 6 years).

As of the 2001 India census, Kharimala Khagrabari had a population of 7214. Males and females each constituted 50% of the population. Kharimala Khagrabari had an average literacy rate of 77%, higher than the national average of 59.5%; male literacy was 81%, and female literacy was 73%. In Kharimala Khagrabari, 10% of the population was under 6 years of age.

== Infrastructure ==
According to the District Census Handbook 2011, Koch Bihar, Kharimala Khagrabari covered an area of 3.8 km^{2}. Among the civic amenities, it had 7 km roads with open drains, the protected water supply involved overhead tank, hand pump, and an uncovered well. It had 1,100 electric connections, 70 road lighting points. Among the medical facilities the nearest dispensary/ health centre was 2 km away, it had 7 medicine shops in town. Among the educational facilities it had 3 primary schools, 1 middle schools, 3 secondary schools, 3 senior secondary schools, the nearest general degree college at Cooch Behar 2 km away. Among the social, cultural and recreational facilities, it had 1 orphanage, 1 public library, 1 reading room. Important commodities it produced were handloom and bidis. It had the branch of 1 agricultural credit society.
