= Baisguri =

- Census Town
- Location in West Bengal, India Baisguri (India)
- Coordinates: 26.3437°N 89.4739°E
- Country: India
- State: West Bengal
- District: Cooch Behar

Area
  - Total: 1.5618 km^{2} (0.6030 sq mi)

Population (2011)
  - Total: 5,021
  - Density: 3,215/km^{2} (8,327/sq mi)
- Time zone: UTC+5:30 (IST)
- PIN: 736156
- Telephone/STD code: 03582
- Vehicle registration: WB
- Lok Sabha constituency: Cooch Behar
- Vidhan Sabha constituency: Cooch Behar Dakshin
- Website: coochbehar.gov.in

Baisguri is a census town in the Cooch Behar II CD block in the Cooch Behar Sadar subdivision of the Cooch Behar district in the state of West Bengal, India.

== Geography ==
Places in the Cooch Behar Sadar subdivision in Cooch Behar district
CT: census town, M: municipal town, R: rural/ urban centre, H: historical/ religious centre
Owing to space constraints in the small map, the actual locations in a larger map may vary slightly

=== Location ===
Baisguri is located at 26.3437°N 89.4739°E.

=== Area overview ===
The map alongside shows the north-central part of the district. In an overwhelming rural district, 22.08% of the population of the Cooch Behar Sadar subdivision lives in the urban areas and 77.92% lives in the rural areas. The entire district forms the flat alluvial flood plains of mighty rivers.

Note: The map alongside presents some of the notable locations in the subdivision. All places marked in the map are linked in the larger full screen map.

== Demographics ==
As per the 2011 Census of India, Baisguri had a total population of 5,021. There were 2,577 (51%) males and 2,444 (49%) females. There were 518 persons in the age range of 0 to 6 years. The total number of literate people in Baisguri was 3,844 (85.37% of the population over 6 years).

== Infrastructure ==
According to the District Census Handbook 2011, Koch Bihar, Baisguri covered an area of 1.5618 km^{2}. Among the civic amenities, the protected water supply involved overhead tank, tap water from treated sources, hand pumps. It had 483 electric connections. Among the medical facilities it had 1 hospital. Among the educational facilities it had 2 primary schools, 2 middle schools, 1 secondary school, 1 senior secondary school. It had the branch offices of 1 nationalised bank, 1 non- agricultural credit society.
