= Khagrabari =

- Census Town
- Location in West Bengal, India Khagrabari (India) Khagrabari (Asia)
- Coordinates: 26.36°N 89.46°E
- Country: India
- State: West Bengal
- District: Cooch Behar

Area
  - Total: 5.69 km^{2} (2.20 sq mi)

Population (2011)
  - Total: 23,122
  - Density: 4,060/km^{2} (10,500/sq mi)

Languages
  - Official: Bengali
  - Additional official: English
- Time zone: UTC+5:30 (IST)
- Vehicle registration: WB
- Website: coochbehar.nic.in

Khagrabari is a census town in the Cooch Behar II CD block in the Cooch Behar Sadar subdivision of the Cooch Behar district in the Indian state of West Bengal.

== Geography ==
Places in the Cooch Behar Sadar subdivision in Cooch Behar district
CT: census town, M: municipal town, R: rural/ urban centre, H: historical/ religious centre
Owing to space constraints in the small map, the actual locations in a larger map may vary slightly

=== Location ===
Khagrabari is located at 26.36°N 89.46°E.

=== Area overview ===
The map below shows the north-central part of the district. It has the highest level of urbanisation in an overwhelmingly rural district. 22.08% of the population of the Cooch Behar Sadar subdivision lives in the urban area and 77.92% in rural areas. The entire district forms the flat alluvial flood plains of mighty rivers.

Note: The map alongside presents some of the notable locations in the subdivision. All places marked in the map are linked in the larger full screen map.

== Demographics ==
As per the 2011 Census of India, Khagrabari had a total population of 23,122. There were 11,733 (51%) males and 11,389 (49%) females. There were 2,110 persons in the age range of 0 to 6 years. The total number of literate people in Khagrabari was 18,606 (88.55% of the population over 6 years).

As of 2001 India census, Khagrabari had a population of 19,762. Males constitute 51% of the population and females 49%. Khagrabari has an average literacy rate of 76%, higher than the national average of 59.5%: male literacy is 82%, and female literacy is 71%. In Khagrabari, 11% of the population is under 6 years of age.

== Infrastructure ==
According to the District Census Handbook 2011, Koch Bihar, Khagrabari covered an area of 5.69 km^{2}. Among the civic amenities, it had 35 km roads with open drains, the protected water supply involved overhead tank, tap water from treated sources.. It had 2,246 electric connections. Among the medical facilities it had 1 nursing home, 7 medicine shop. Among the educational facilities it had 14 primary schools, 3 middle schools, 3 secondary schools, 2 senior secondary schools, the nearest general degree college at Cooch Behar 5 km away. It had 1 non-formal education centre (Sarva Shiksha Abhiyan). Among the social, recreational and cultural facilities it had 1 cinema theatre, 3 auditorium/ community halls, 1 public library and 1 reading room. Three important commodities it produced were rice, fodder, atta. It had the branch offices of 1 nationalised bank, 1 non- agricultural credit society.
