= Sidheswari =

- Village
- Location in West Bengal, India Sidheswari (India)
- Coordinates: 26.38673°N 89.51272°E
- Country: India
- State: West Bengal
- District: Cooch Behar

Population (2011)
  - Total: 4,467
- Time zone: UTC+5:30 (IST)
- PIN: 736133
- Telephone/STD code: 03582
- Vehicle registration: WB
- Lok Sabha constituency: Cooch Behar
- Vidhan Sabha constituency: Cooch Behar Uttar
- Website: coochbehar.gov.in

Sidheswari is a village in the Cooch Behar II CD block in the Cooch Behar Sadar subdivision of the Cooch Behar district in West Bengal, India

== Geography ==
Places in the Cooch Behar Sadar subdivision in Cooch Behar district
CT: census town, M: municipal town, R: rural/ urban centre, H: historical/ religious centre
Owing to space constraints in the small map, the actual locations in a larger map may vary slightly

=== Location ===
Sidheswari is located at 26.38673°N 89.51272°E.

=== Area overview ===
The map alongside shows the north-central part of the district. It has the highest level of urbanisation in an overwhelming rural district. 22.08% of the population of the Cooch Behar Sadar subdivision lives in the urban areas and 77.92% lives in the rural areas. The entire district forms the flat alluvial flood plains of mighty rivers.

Note: The map alongside presents some of the notable locations in the subdivision. All places marked in the map are linked in the larger full screen map.

== Demographics ==
As per the 2011 Census of India, Sidheswari had a total population of 4,467. There were 2,327 (52%) males and 2,140 (48%) females. There were 496 persons in the age range of 0 to 6 years. The total number of literate people in Sidheswari was 3,382 (85.17% of the population over 6 years).

== Transport ==
New Baneswar railway station, on the New Jalpaiguri–New Bongaigaon section of the Barauni–Guwahati line, is about 1.6 kilometres (0.99 mi) from Sidheswari.

== Culture ==
The temple of Sidheswari Devi is a brick-built structure having an unusual octagonal shape with a dome on top of it. It has a height of 9.3 metres (31 ft). There is a raised platform in front of the temple. The internal distance from one corner of the temple to another is around 2.5 metres (8 ft 2 in). The 15.5 centimetres (6.1 in) tall idol of Sidheswari Devi in the garbhagriha is made of ashtadhatu. The four-handed goddess is worshipped as a form of goddess Kali. According to Madho Sarup Vats, of the Archaeological Survey, the temple is an example of British architectural influence. He particularly points out the pillars in the structure. The temple seems to have been built by the Maharajas of Cooch Behar State in end 19th century or early 20th century.

== Sidheswari temple picture gallery ==
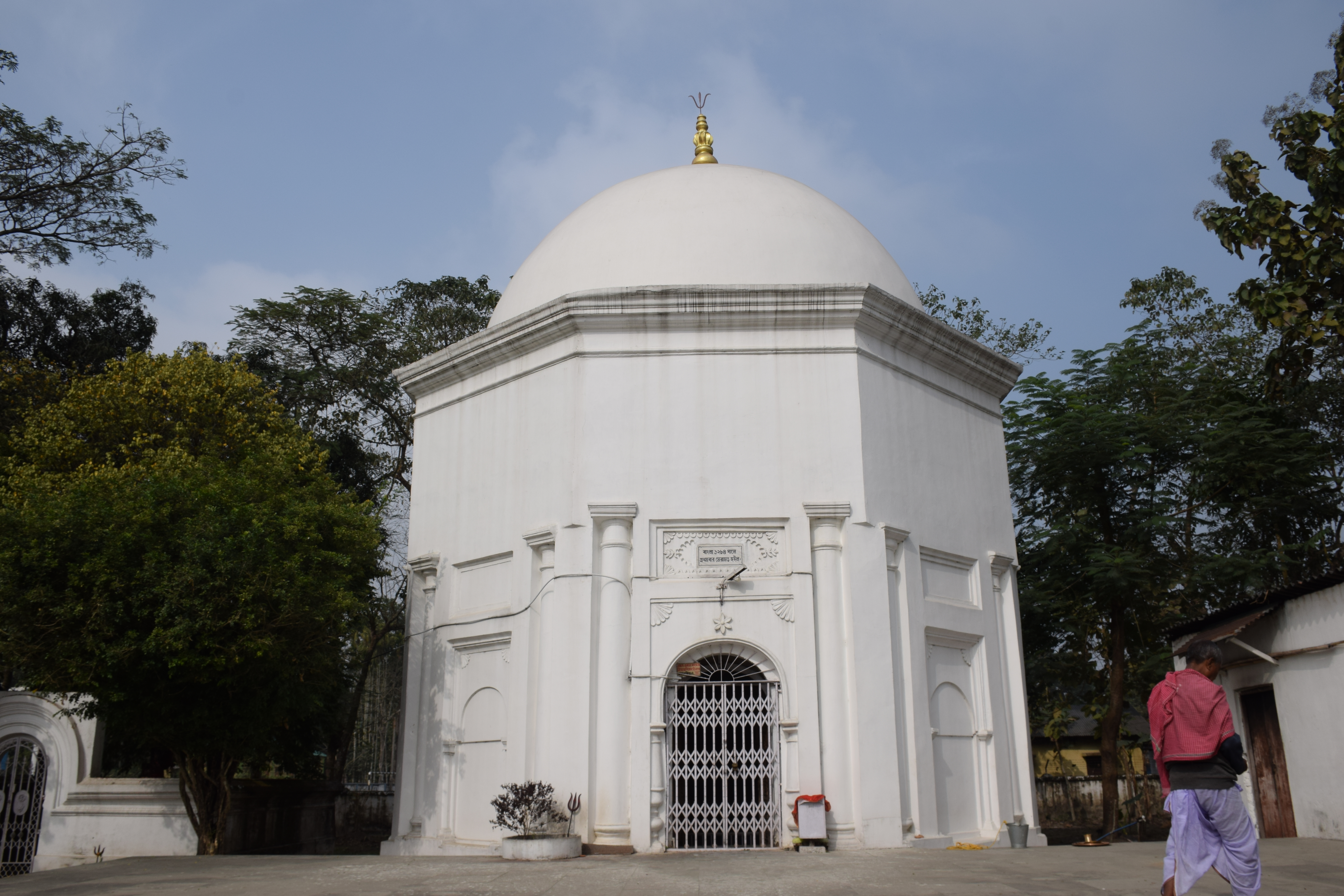

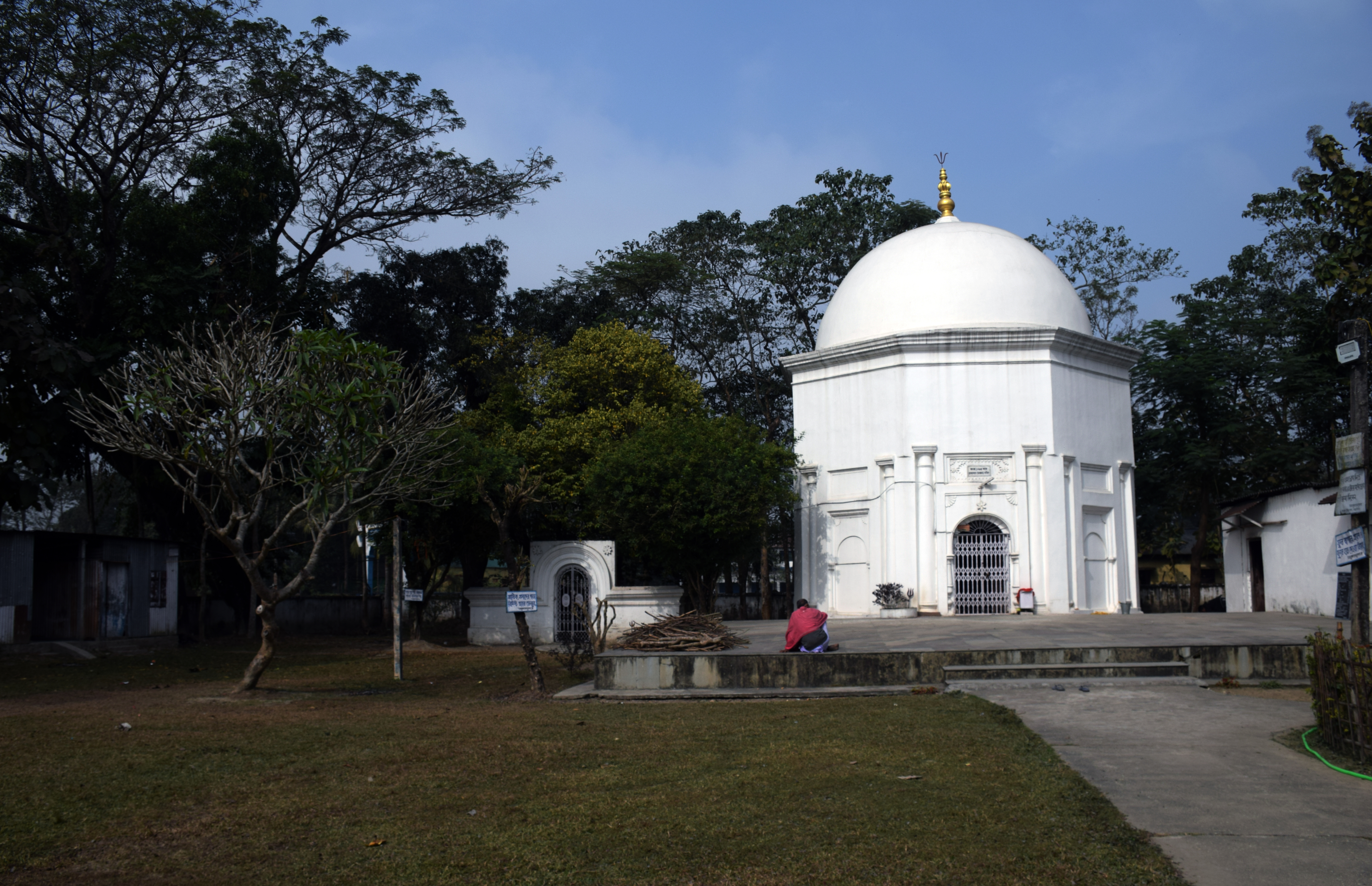

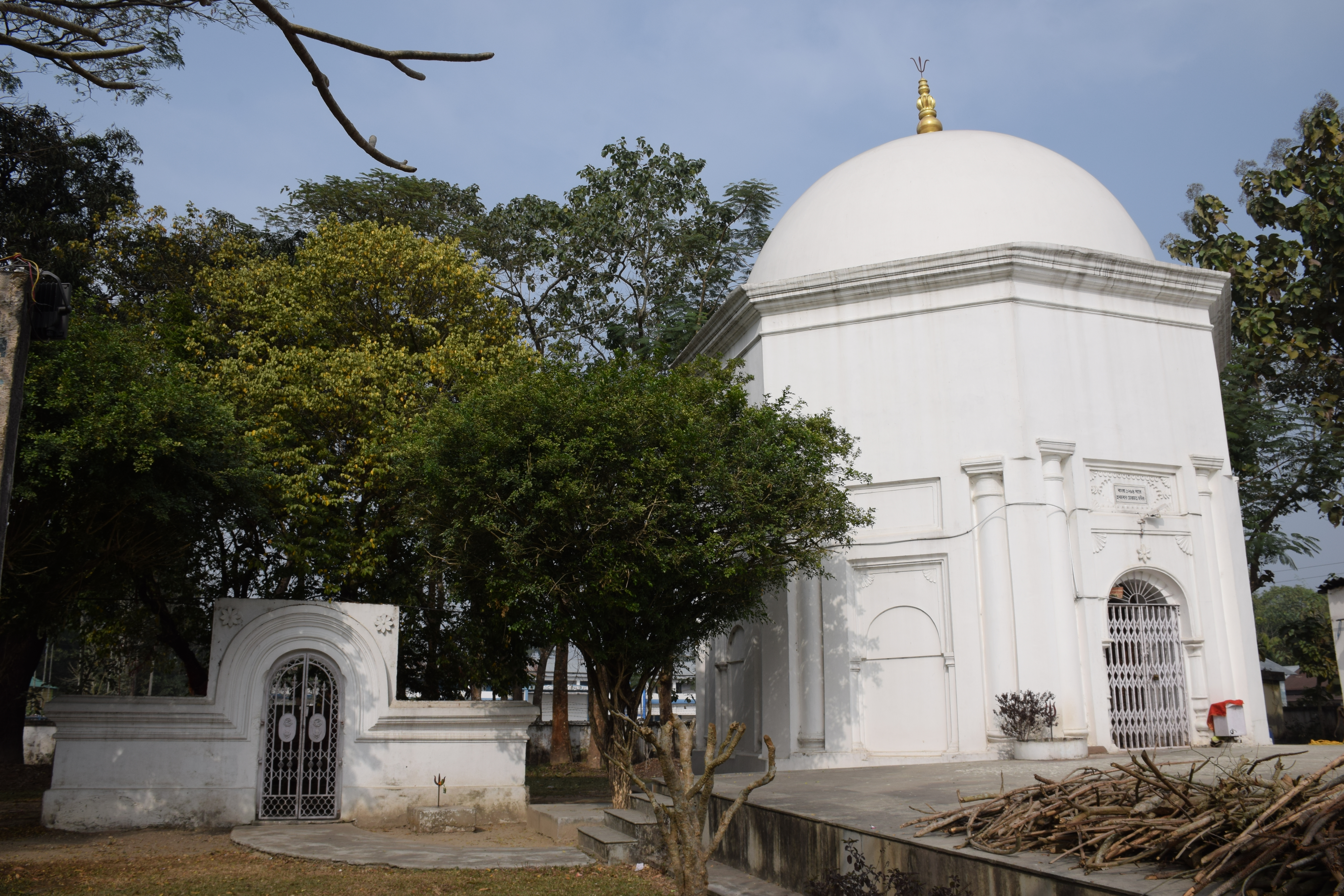
