= Dudher Kuthi Dewan Bosh =

- Village
- Location in West Bengal, India
- Coordinates: 26.302658°N 89.400958°E
- Country: India
- State: West Bengal
- District: Cooch Behar

Languages
  - Official: Bengali, English
- Time zone: UTC+5:30 (IST)
- PIN: 736170
- Lok Sabha constituency: Cooch Behar
- Vidhan Sabha constituency: Cooch Behar Dakshin

Dudher Kuthi Dewan Bosh is a village under the gram panchayat of Suktabari in the Cooch Behar I division of Cooch Behar Sadar subdivision of Cooch Behar district in West Bengal, India.
