= Guriahati =

- Census Town
- Location in West Bengal, India Guriahati (India) Guriahati (Asia)
- Coordinates: 26.3096°N 89.48659°E
- Country: India
- State: West Bengal
- District: Cooch Behar

Area
  - Total: 5.1 km^{2} (2.0 sq mi)

Population (2011)
  - Total: 21,064
  - Density: 4,100/km^{2} (11,000/sq mi)

Languages
  - Official: Bengali
  - Additional official: English
- Time zone: UTC+5:30 (IST)
- Vehicle registration: WB
- Website: coochbehar.nic.in

Guriahati is a census town in the Cooch Behar I CD block in the Cooch Behar Sadar subdivision of the Cooch Behar district in the Indian state of West Bengal.

== Geography ==
Places in the Cooch Behar Sadar subdivision in Cooch Behar district
CT: census town, M: municipal town, R: rural/ urban centre, H: historical/ religious centre
Owing to space constraints in the small map, the actual locations in a larger map may vary slightly

=== Location ===
Guriahati is located at 26.3096°N 89.48659°E.

=== Area overview ===
The map alongside shows the north-central part of the district. It has the highest level of urbanisation in an overwhelming rural district. 22.08% of the population of the Cooch Behar Sadar subdivision lives in the urban areas and 77.92% lives in the rural areas. The entire district forms the flat alluvial flood plains of mighty rivers.

Note: The map alongside presents some of the notable locations in the subdivision. All places marked in the map are linked in the larger full screen map.

== Demographics ==
As of 2011 Indian Census, Guriahati had a total population of 21,064, of which 10,647 were males and 10,417 were females. Population within the age group of 0 to 6 years was 2,051. The total number of literates in Guriahati was 16,348, which constituted 77.6% of the population with male literacy of 81.3% and female literacy of 73.9%. The effective literacy rate of 7+ population of Guriahati was 86.0%, of which male literacy rate was 90.2% and female literacy rate was 81.7%. The Scheduled Castes and Scheduled Tribes population was 4,735 and 35 respectively. Guriahati had 5122 households in 2011.

As of 2001 India census, Guriahati had a population of 18,896. Males constitute 51% of the population and females 49%. Guriahati has an average literacy rate of 73%, higher than the national average of 59.5%: male literacy is 78%, and female literacy is 67%. In Guriahati, 11% of the population is under 6 years of age.

== Infrastructure ==
According to the District Census Handbook 2011, Koch Bihar, Guriahati covered an area of 5.1 km^{2}. Among the civic amenities, it had 42 km roads with open drains, the protected water supply involved overhead tank, and tap water from untreated sources. It had 5,400 electricity connections and 702 road lighting points. Among the medical facilities it had 1 dispensary/ health centre, 9 medicine shops. Among the educational facilities it had 18 primary schools, 3 middle schools, 2 secondary schools, 1 senior secondary school, the nearest general degree college at Cooch Behar 1 km away. Three important commodities it produced were jute, handloom and bidis. It had the branch of 1 nationalised bank.
