= Takagachh =

- Census Town
- Location in West Bengal, India Takagachh (India)
- Coordinates: 26.3312°N 89.4322°E
- Country: India
- State: West Bengal
- District: Cooch Behar

Area
  - Total: 3.1417 km^{2} (1.2130 sq mi)

Population (2011)
  - Total: 12,418
  - Density: 3,952.6/km^{2} (10,237/sq mi)
- Time zone: UTC+5:30 (IST)
- PIN: 736179
- Telephone/STD code: 03582
- Vehicle registration: WB
- Lok Sabha constituency: Cooch Behar
- Vidhan Sabha constituency: Cooch Behar Dakshin
- Website: coochbehar.gov.in

Takagachh is a census town in the Cooch Behar II CD block in the Cooch Behar Sadar subdivision of the Cooch Behar district in the state of West Bengal, India.

== Geography ==
Places in the Cooch Behar Sadar subdivision in Cooch Behar district
CT: census town, M: municipal town, R: rural/ urban centre, H: historical/ religious centre
Owing to space constraints in the small map, the actual locations in a larger map may vary slightly

=== Location ===
Takagachh is located at 26.3312°N 89.4322°E.

=== Area overview ===
The map alongside shows the north-central part of the district. It has the highest level of urbanisation in an overwhelming rural district. 22.08% of the population of the Cooch Behar Sadar subdivision lives in the urban areas and 77.92% lives in the rural areas. The entire district forms the flat alluvial flood plains of mighty rivers.

Note: The map alongside presents some of the notable locations in the subdivision. All places marked in the map are linked in the larger full screen map.

== Demographics ==
As per the 2011 Census of India, Takagachh had a population of 12,418. There were 6,375 (51%) males and 6,043 (49%) females. There were 1,343 persons in the age range of 0 to 6 years. The number of literate people in Takagachh was 8,428 (76.10% of the population over 6 years).

== Infrastructure ==
According to the District Census Handbook 2011, Koch Bihar, Takagachh covered an area of 3.1417 km^{2}. Among the civic amenities, the protected water supply involved overhead tank, tap water from treated sources, hand pumps. It had 3,218 electric connections. Among the medical facilities it had 1 dispensary/ health centre. Among the educational facilities it had 6 primary schools.
