= Haripuram =

- Village
- Interactive map of Haripuram
- Location in Andhra Pradesh, India Haripuram (India)
- Coordinates: 18.8500°N 84.5167°E
- Country: India
- State: Andhra Pradesh
- District: Srikakulam
- Talukas: Mandasa

Population
  - Total: 2,673

Languages
  - Official: Telugu
- Time zone: UTC+5:30 (IST)
- PIN: 532243
- Telephone code: 918947
- Lok Sabha constituency: Palasa

Haripuram is a village in Mandasa mandal of Srikakulam district, Andhra Pradesh, India.

== Geography ==
Haripur or Haripuram is located at 18.8500°N 84.5167°E. It has an average elevation of 44 meters (147 feet). Haripuram is a village in Mandasa Mandal in Srikakulam District in Andhra Pradesh State in India. And 657 km distance from its State Main City Hyderabad. Near By towns are Sompeta (10.8 km), Kanchili (14.1 km), Palasa (16.4 km), Vajrapukotturu (22.5 km). The nearest railway station is Mandasa Road. It is one km away from Haripuram on Chennai- Howrah main line falling under East Coast Rail Zone.

== Demographics ==
According to Indian census, 2001, the demographic details of Haripuram village is as follows:

- Total Population: 2,673 in 630 Households
- Male Population: 1,337 and Female Population: 1,336
- Children Under 6-years of age: 333 (Boys - 177 and Girls - 156)
- Total Literates: 1,700
