= Haripur, Bhopal =

Haripur
- village
- Location within Madhya Pradesh Location within India
- Coordinates: 23.805212°N 77.368469°E
- Country: India
- State: Madhya Pradesh
- District: Bhopal
- Tehsil: Berasia

Population (2011)
  - Total: 639
- Time zone: UTC+5:30 (IST)
- ISO 3166 code: IN-MP
- Census code: 482140

Haripur is a village in the Bhopal district of Madhya Pradesh, India. It is located in the Berasia tehsil.

== Demographics ==
According to the 2011 census of India, Haripur has 105 households. The effective literacy rate (i.e. the literacy rate of population excluding children aged 6 and below) is 37.4%.

Demographics (2011 Census)
| | Total | Male | Female |
|---|---|---|---|
| Population | 639 | 353 | 286 |
| Children aged below 6 years | 131 | 66 | 65 |
| Scheduled caste | 29 | 13 | 16 |
| Scheduled tribe | 0 | 0 | 0 |
| Literates | 190 | 142 | 48 |
| Workers (all) | 392 | 214 | 178 |
| Main workers (total) | 5 | 4 | 1 |
| Main workers: Cultivators | 2 | 2 | 0 |
| Main workers: Agricultural labourers | 1 | 1 | 0 |
| Main workers: Household industry workers | 0 | 0 | 0 |
| Main workers: Other | 2 | 1 | 1 |
| Marginal workers (total) | 387 | 210 | 177 |
| Marginal workers: Cultivators | 135 | 99 | 36 |
| Marginal workers: Agricultural labourers | 238 | 104 | 134 |
| Marginal workers: Household industry workers | 14 | 7 | 7 |
| Marginal workers: Others | 0 | 0 | 0 |
| Non-workers | 247 | 139 | 108 |
