= Baikunthpur, Madhya Pradesh =

Baikunthpur
- Town
- Location in Madhya Pradesh, India Baikunthpur (India)
- Coordinates: 24°43′41″N 81°24′36″E
- Country: India
- State: Madhya Pradesh
- District: Rewa District
- ISO 3166 code: IN-MP

Baikunthpur is a town and a nagar panchayat in Rewa district in the state of Madhya Pradesh, India. It is about 25 kilometers from Rewa.

== Demographics ==
As of 2001 India census, Baikunthpur had a population of 9,301. Males constitute 52% of the population and females 48%. Baikunthpur has an average literacy rate of 59%, lower than the national average of 59.5%; with 61% of the males and 39% of females literate. 18% of the population is under 6 years of age.
