= Haripur, Raebareli =

Haripur
- Village
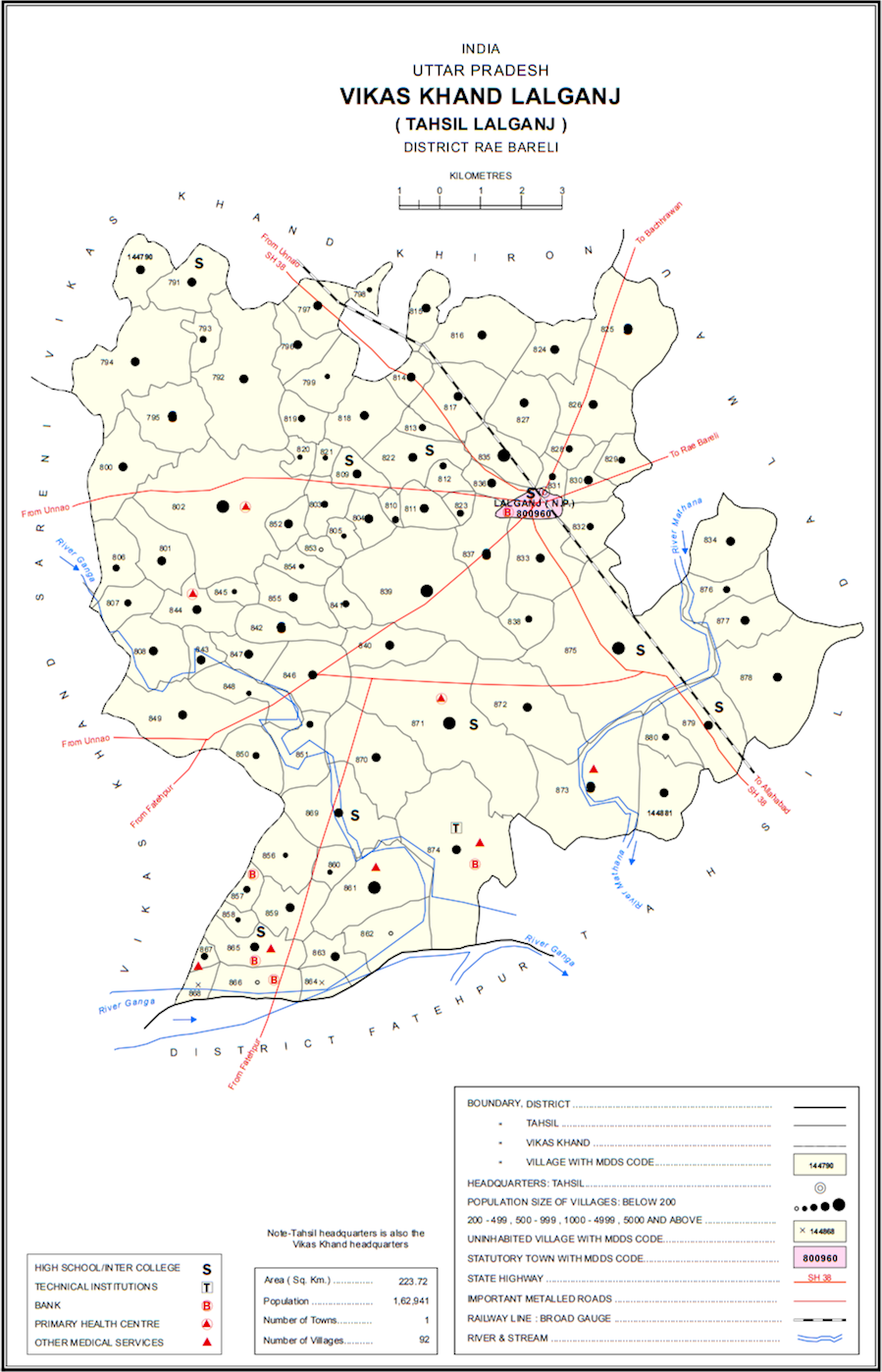
- Map showing Haripur (#809) in Lalganj CD block

- Location in Uttar Pradesh, India
- Coordinates: 26.173174°N 80.935477°E
- Country: India
- State: Uttar Pradesh
- District: Raebareli

Area
  - Total: 1.273 km^{2} (0.492 sq mi)

Population (2011)
  - Total: 1,527
  - Density: 1,200/km^{2} (3,107/sq mi)

Languages
  - Official: Hindi
- Time zone: UTC+5:30 (IST)
- Vehicle registration: UP-35

Haripur is a village in Lalganj block of Rae Bareli district, Uttar Pradesh, India. It is located 3 km from Lalganj, the block and tehsil headquarters. As of 2011, it has a population of 1,527 people, in 270 households. It has 1 primary school and no healthcare facilities, and it does not host a permanent market or a weekly haat. It belongs to the nyaya panchayat of Mubarakpur.

The 1951 census recorded Haripur as comprising 4 hamlets, with a total population of 450 people (219 male and 231 female), in 81 households and 63 physical houses. The area of the village was given as 300 acres. 57 residents were literate, 55 male and 2 female. The village was listed as belonging to the pargana of Khiron and the thana of Sareni.

The 1961 census recorded Haripur as comprising 4 hamlets, with a total population of 574 people (290 male and 284 female), in 82 households and 71 physical houses. The area of the village was given as 300 acres.

The 1981 census recorded Haripur as having a population of 896 people, in 127 households, and having an area of 127.08 hectares. The main staple foods were listed as wheat and rice.

The 1991 census recorded Haripur as having a total population of 1,044 people (515 male and 529 female), in 159 households and 159 physical houses. The area of the village was listed as 127 hectares. Members of the 0-6 age group numbered 219, or 21% of the total; this group was 59% male (129) and 41% female (90). Members of scheduled castes made up 24% of the village's population, while no members of scheduled tribes were recorded. The literacy rate of the village was 52% (330 men and 213 women). 226 people were classified as main workers (218 men and 8 women), while 2 people were classified as marginal workers (both women); the remaining 816 residents were non-workers. The breakdown of main workers by employment category was as follows: 94 cultivators (i.e. people who owned or leased their own land); 53 agricultural labourers (i.e. people who worked someone else's land in return for payment); 0 workers in livestock, forestry, fishing, hunting, plantations, orchards, etc.; 0 in mining and quarrying; 0 household industry workers; 13 workers employed in other manufacturing, processing, service, and repair roles; 1 construction worker; 12 employed in trade and commerce; 10 employed in transport, storage, and communications; and 43 in other services.
