= Dhaliabari =

- Census Town
- Location in West Bengal, India Dhaliabari (India)
- Coordinates: 26.280752°N 89.471759°E
- Country: India
- State: West Bengal
- District: Cooch Behar

Area
  - Total: 2.8024 km^{2} (1.0820 sq mi)

Population (2011)
  - Total: 4,383
  - Density: 1,564/km^{2} (4,051/sq mi)
- Time zone: UTC+5:30 (IST)
- PIN: 736170
- Telephone/STD code: 03582
- Vehicle registration: WB
- Lok Sabha constituency: Cooch Behar
- Vidhan Sabha constituency: Cooch Behar Dakshin
- Website: coochbehar.gov.in

Dhaliabari is a census town in the Cooch Behar I CD block in the Cooch Behar Sadar subdivision of the Cooch Behar district in the state of West Bengal, India.

== Geography ==
Places in the Cooch Behar Sadar subdivision in Cooch Behar district
CT: census town, M: municipal town, R: rural/ urban centre, H: historical/ religious centre
Owing to space constraints in the small map, the actual locations in a larger map may vary slightly

=== Location ===
Dhaliabari is located at 26.280752°N 89.471759°E.

=== Area overview ===
The map alongside shows the north-central part of the district. It has the highest level of urbanisation in an overwhelming rural district. 22.08% of the population of the Cooch Behar Sadar subdivision lives in the urban areas and 77.92% lives in the rural areas. The entire district forms the flat alluvial flood plains of mighty rivers.

Note: The map alongside presents some of the notable locations in the subdivision. All places marked in the map are linked in the larger full screen map.

== Demographics ==
As per the 2011 Census of India, Dhaliabari had a total population of 4,383, with 2,265 (52%) males and 2,118 (48%) females. There were 453 persons in the age range of 0 to 6 years. The total number of literate people in Dhaliabari was 3,112 (79.19% of the population over 6 years).

== Infrastructure ==
According to the District Census Handbook 2011, Koch Bihar, Dhaliabari covered an area of 2.8024 km^{2}. Among the civic amenities, it had 2 km roads, the protected water supply involved tap water from untreated sources. It had 500 electricity connections, 35 road lighting points. Among the medical facilities it had 1 family welfare centre, 1 medicine shop. Among the educational facilities it had 1 primary school, 1 middle school, 1 secondary school, 1 senior secondary school, the nearest general degree college at Cooch Behar 6 km away. Three important commodities it produced were sitalpati, paddy, jute. It had the branch of 1 non-agricultural credit society.

== Culture ==
The pancharatna Siddhanath Shiva temple at Dhaliabari is unique because of the attachment of some terracotta panels. It is probably the only temple in Cooch Behar district, and among the exceptional few in the northern part of West Bengal, to have some terracotta panels. There are four towers at the four corners of the curved roof, but the larger central tower is missing. The temple is 9.1 metres (30 ft) high and has a square base of 6.4 metres (21 ft).

The temple has a mihrab, normally found in mosques. There are two possibilities for this: an attempt was made to convert it to a mosque during the short Muslim rule in the 18th century or it was included by the Muslim artisans as a matter of regular practice. Muslim architectural influence in Hindu temples is not totally unknown. Apart from the main Siddhanath Shiva Linga, Narayana-shila is also worshipped in this temple.

There is some controversy regarding the construction of the Siddhanath Shiva temple. According to Madho Sarup Vats, of the Archaeological Survey, the temple was built during the rule of Raja Upendra Narayan (1714-1763) of the Cooch Behar State. However, historian Harendra Narayan Choudhury opined that the temple construction was initiated during the period of Raja Harendra Narayan (1780-1839) and completed by his son Raja Shivendra Narayan (1796-1849). In 1808, Dr. Buchanan Hamilton, also submitted a report. It can be said that Raja Upendra Narayan built the temple, and Raja Harendra Narayan and Raja Shivendra Narayan may have renovated it.

The Siddhanath Shiva temple is a state protected monument.

== Siddhanath Shiva temple picture gallery ==
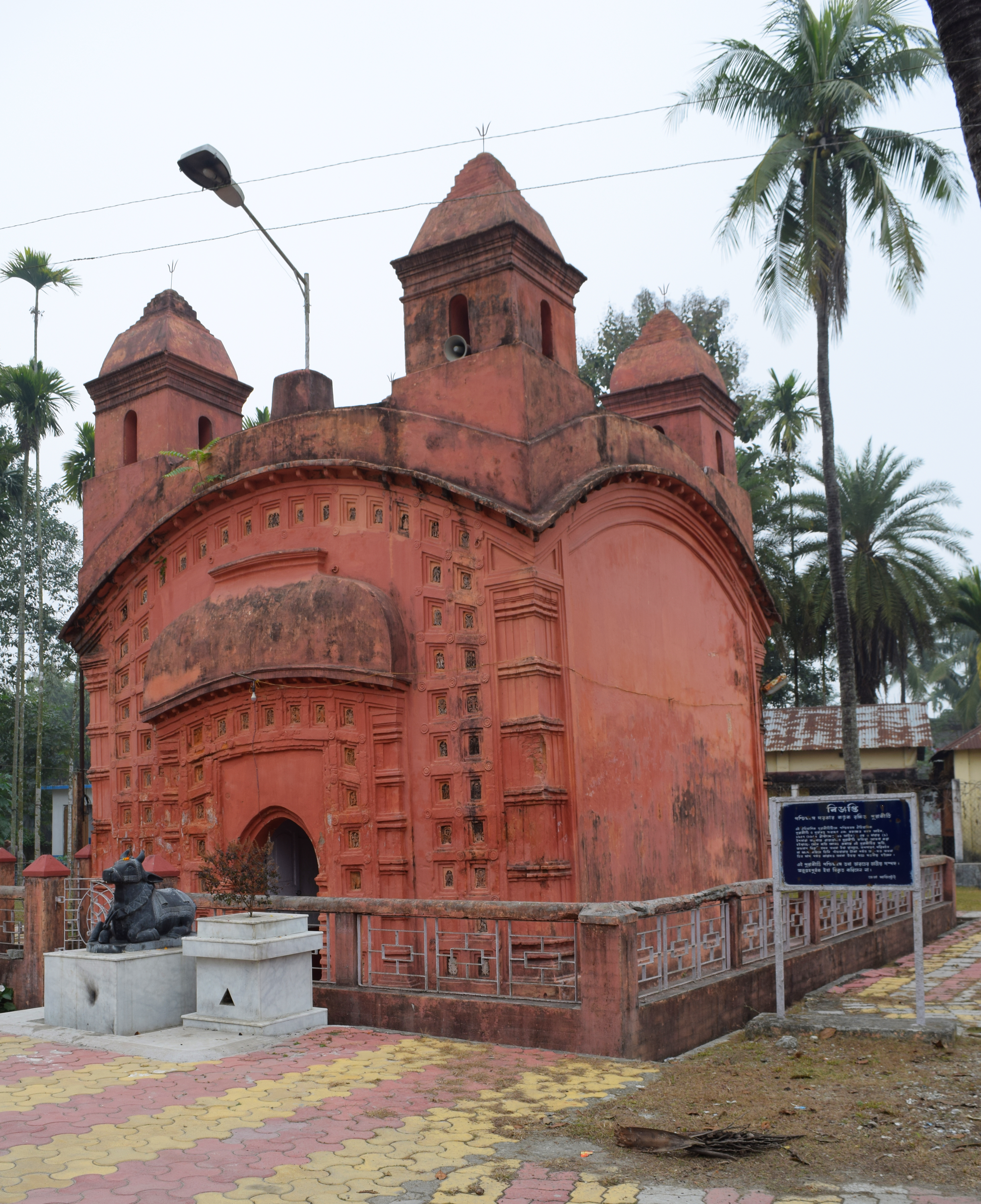

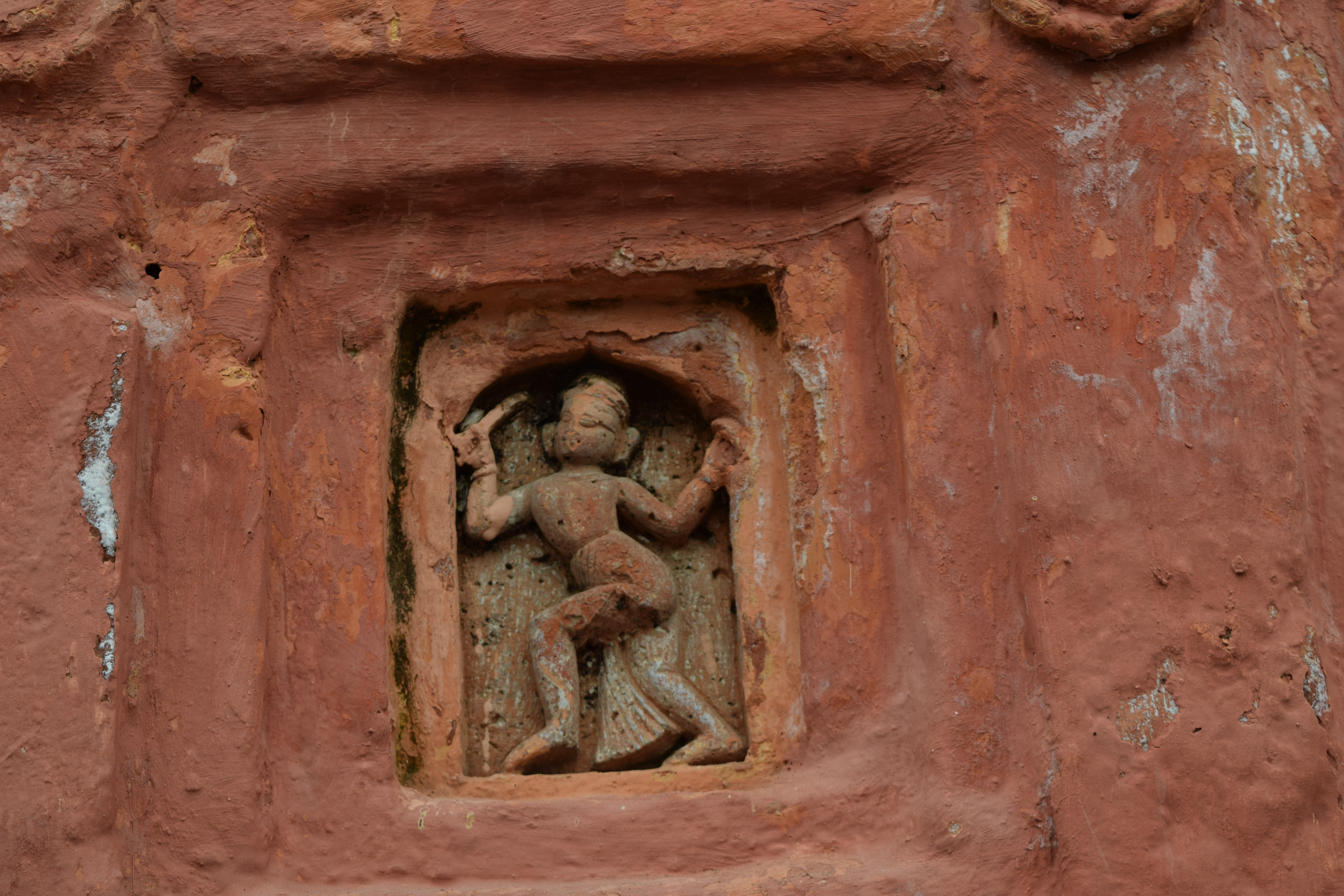

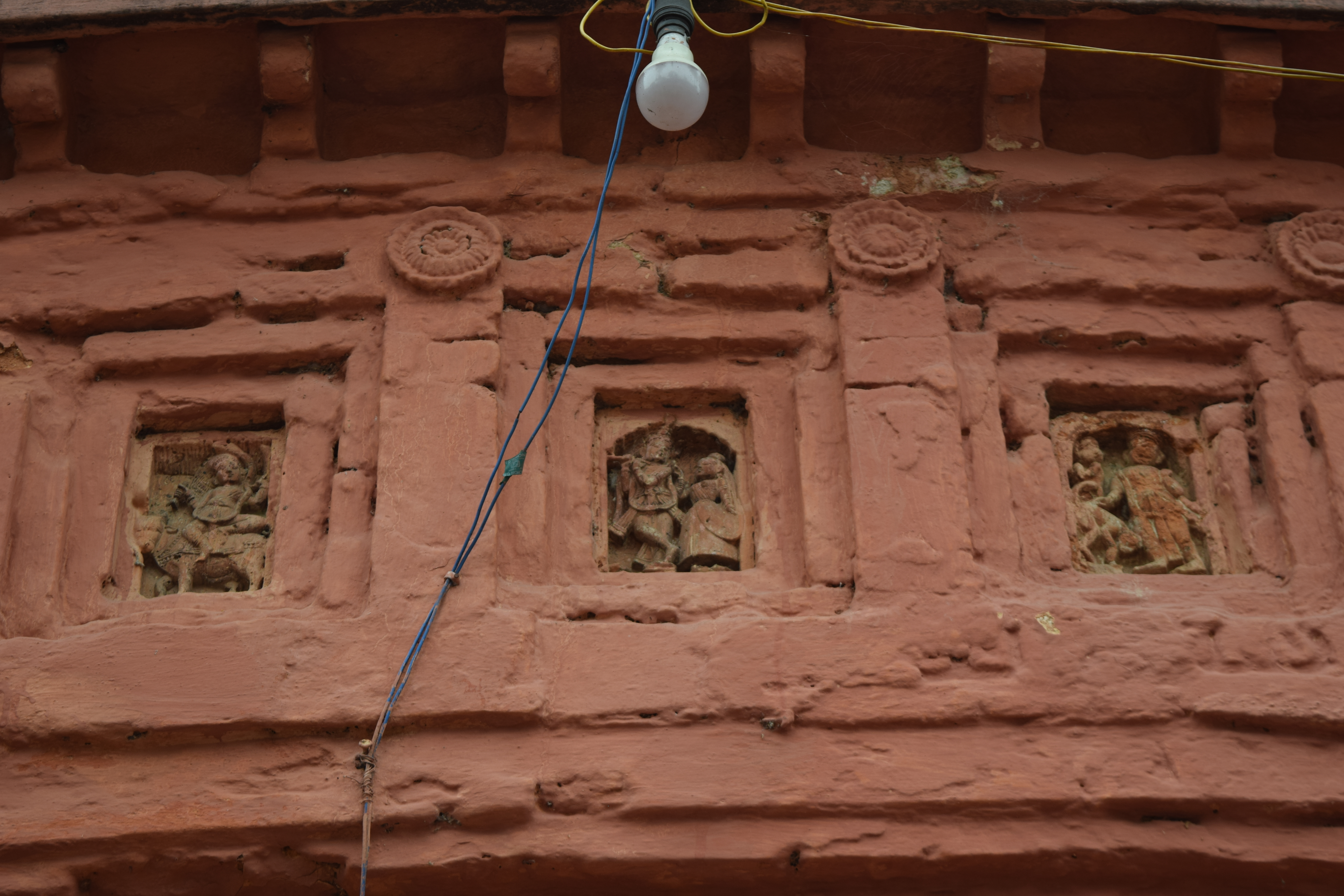

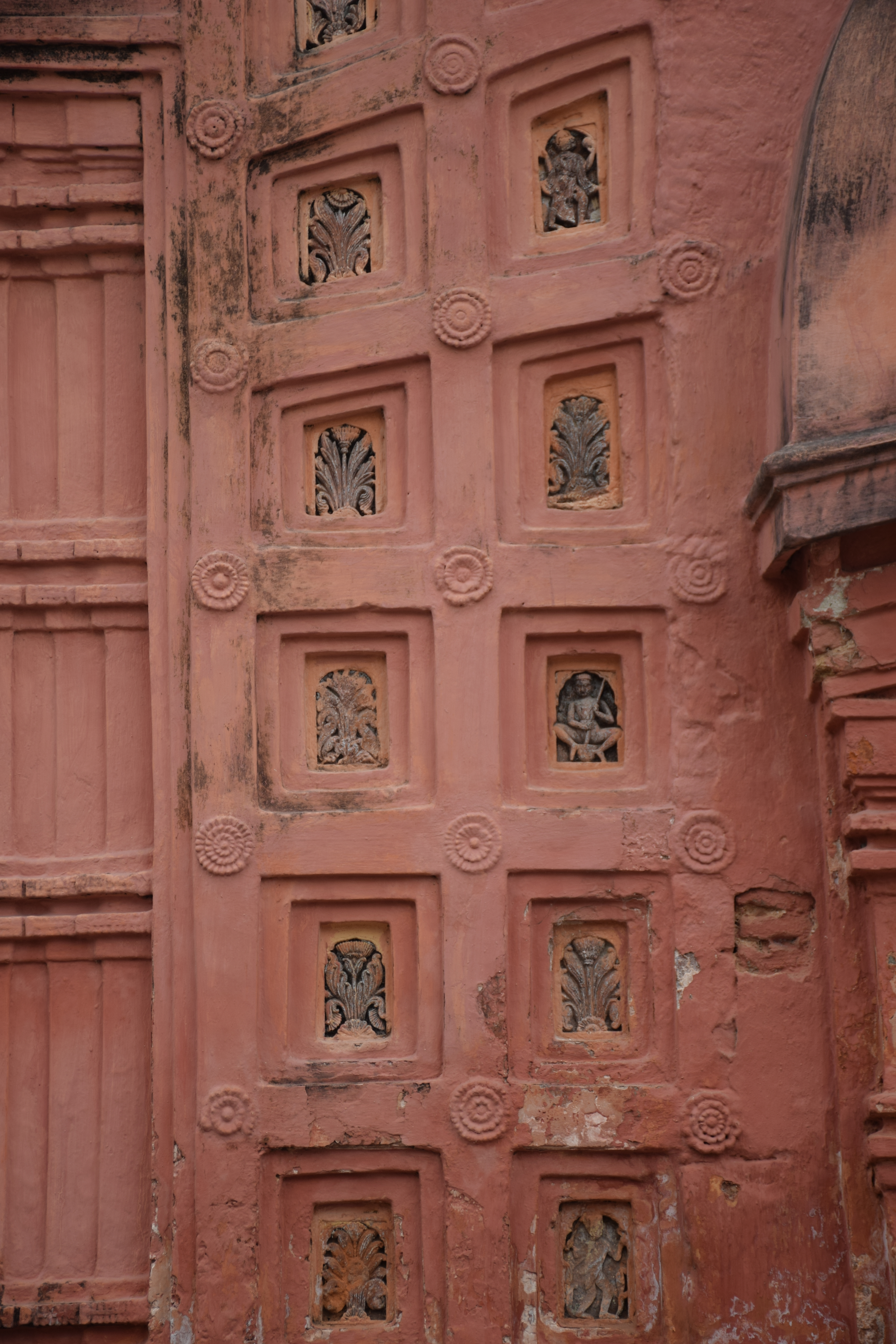
