= Haripur, Bangladesh =

Town in the Barisal Division of Bangladesh

Coordinates: 23°6′0″N 90°59′0″E

Haripur is a town in the Barisal Division of Bangladesh. It is located at 23°6'0N 90°59'0E with an altitude of 3 metres (9.8 ft). Most of its people are Muslim. There are many mosques here and most men like to attend on Fridays. The weather is almost always damp but sunny which leads to dried up mud and slippery surfaces.

There is another village named Haripur in Chatmohar Upazila of Pabna District in Bangladesh.
