= Cooch Behar I =

- Community development block
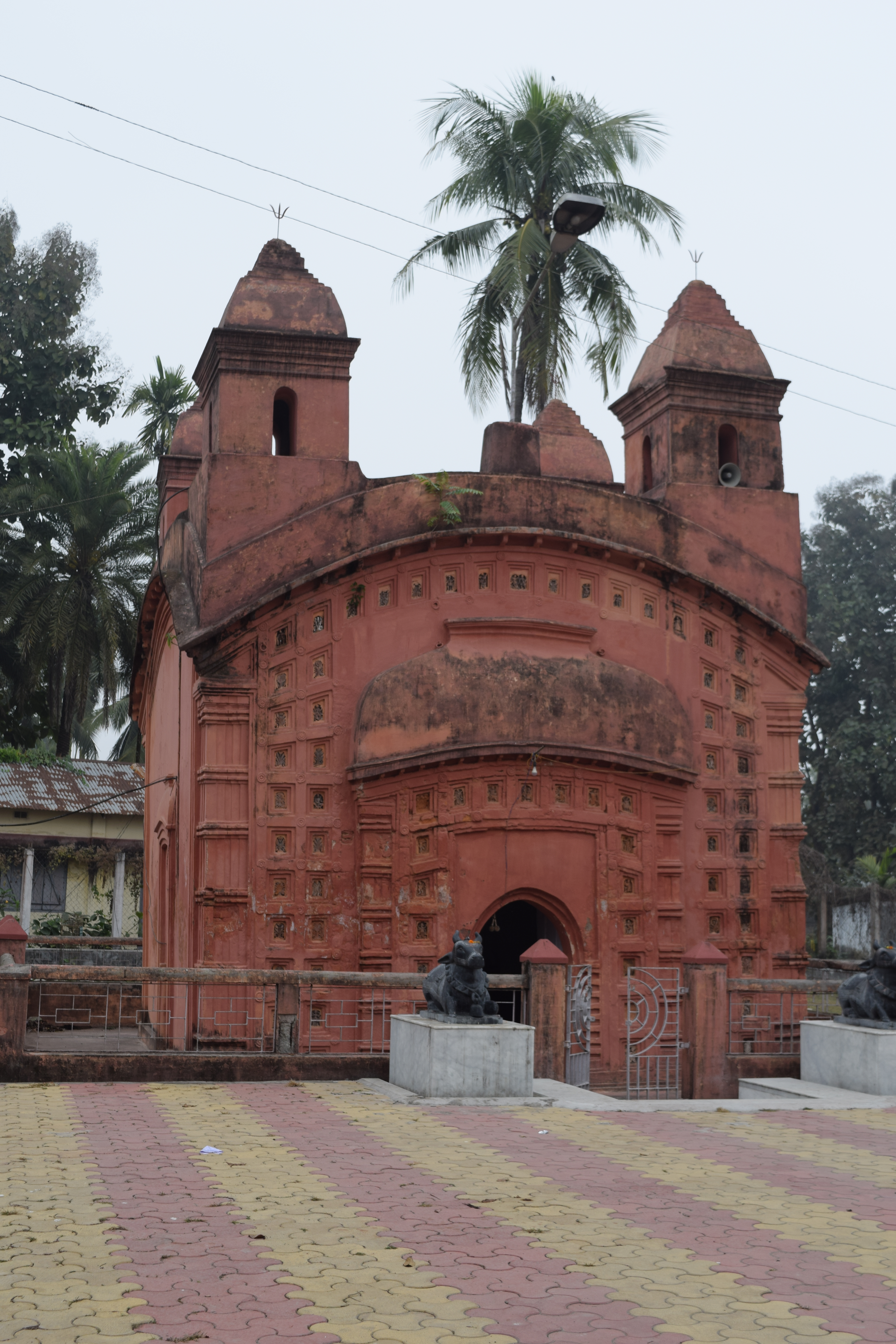
- Siddhanath Shiva temple at Dhaliabari

- Coordinates: 26.3097000°N 89.4862590°E
- Country: India
- State: West Bengal
- District: Cooch Behar

Government
  - Type: Representative democracy

Area
  - Total: 361.17 km^{2} (139.45 sq mi)

Population (2011)
  - Total: 326,558
  - Density: 904.17/km^{2} (2,341.8/sq mi)

Languages
  - Official: Bengali, English
- Time zone: UTC+5:30 (IST)
- Lok Sabha constituency: Cooch Behar
- Vidhan Sabha constituency: Cooch Behar Dakshin, Natabari
- Website: coochbehar.gov.in

Cooch Behar I is a community development block (CD block) that forms an administrative division in the Cooch Behar Sadar subdivision of the Cooch Behar district in the Indian state of West Bengal.

== Geography ==
Guriahati, one of the constituent panchayats of the block, is located at 26°18′35″N 89°29′11″E.

Topographically, Cooch Behar district is generally plain land which is low and marshy at some places. “Considering the nature of general surface configuration, relief and drainage pattern, distribution of different types of soil, climatic condition, the formation of geology and forest tracts, the district Koch Bihar falls under Barind Tract. The physiology of this area consists of alluvial soil, generally blackish brown in colour and composed of sand, clay and silt. The soils are loose and sandy throughout the district.” The Himalayan formations in the north end beyond the boundaries of this district. There are no hills/ mountains here. It has a large network of rivers flowing from north-west to south and south-east. The Teesta flows through Mekhliganj CD block before entering Bangladesh. The Jaldhaka and its connected river-streams form a large catchment area in the district. It virtually divides the district into two unequal parts and meets the Brahmaputra in Bangladesh. The Himalayan rivers flowing through Cooch Behar district change courses from time to time. In 1876, W.W. Hunter mentioned the Dharla and the Torsha as the same stream with two names. However, since the advent of the 20th century, these are two different streams meeting the Brahmaputra in Bangladesh.

The hill-streams of Cooch Behar carry debris and silt from the Himalayas and are shallow. During the monsoons, the speed of flow of the rivers almost doubles and the rivers overflow their banks, causing floods and devastation. The Raidak I and II, Gadadhar, Kaljani, Torsha and Ghargharia are the major rivers causing floods in the Cooch Behar I and II CD blocks.

The Cooch Behar I CD block is bounded by the Mathabhanga II and Cooch Behar II CD blocks on the north, the Tufanganj I CD block on the east, the Dinhata II, Dinhata I and Sitai CD blocks on the south, the Sitalkuchi CD block on the west.

The Cooch Behar I CD block has an area of 361.17 km^{2}. It has 1 panchayat samity, 15 gram panchayats, 240 gram sansads (village councils), 144 mouzas, 142 inhabited villages and 3 census towns. Cooch Behar police station serves this block. Headquarters of this CD block is at Ghughumari.

Community development blocks in Cooch Behar district

Gram panchayats of Cooch Behar I block/ panchayat samiti are: Chandamari, Chikirhat, Dawaguri, Dewanhat, Falimari, Ghugumari, Guriahati I, Guriahati II, Haribhanga, Jiranpur, Moamari, Panishala, Patchhara, Putimari Fuleswari and Suktabari.

== Demographics ==
=== Population ===
According to the 2011 Census of India, the Cooch Behar I CD block had a total population of 326,558, of which 293,267 were rural and 33,291 were urban. There were 168,185 (52%) males and 158,373 (48%) females. There were 40,683 persons in the age range of 0 to 6 years. The Scheduled Castes numbered 129,873 (38.77%) and the Scheduled Tribes numbered 1,225 (0.38%).

According to the 2001 census, Cooch Behar I block had a total population of 284,564, out of which 146,298 were males and 138,266 were females. Cooch Behar I block registered a population growth of 14.79 per cent during the 1991-2001 decade.

Census towns in the Cooch Behar I CD block are (2011 census figures in brackets. Kharimala Khagrabari (7,844), Guriahati (21,064) and Dhaliabari (4,383).

Large villages (with 4,000+ population) in the Cooch Behar I CD block are (2011 census figures in brackets): Dauaguri (6,216), Chhat Guriahati (4,169), Ghughumari (13,764), Paschim Moamari (6,024), Mainaguri Dighalhati (4.049), Dudher Kuthidewanbas (7,758), Kalabarighat (4,361), Rajpur (4,355), Chandamari (7,678), Putimari Phuleswari (4,059), Patchhara (10,074), Haldimohan (5,146), Hari Bhanga (6,736), Pushnadanga (4,281), Dewan Hatmoamari (7,460), Panisala (8,332) and Nawabganj Balasi (10,004).

Other villages in the Cooch Behar I CD block include (2011 census figures in brackets): Jiranpur (2,934) and Gudam Maharaniganj (1,639).

=== Literacy ===
According to the 2011 census, the total number of literate persons in the Cooch Behar I CD block was 218,872 (76.56% of the population over 6 years) out of which males numbered 121,165 (82.29% of the male population over 6 years) and females numbered 97,707 (69.97% of the female population over 6 years). The gender disparity (the difference between female and male literacy rates) was 12.33%.

See also – List of West Bengal districts ranked by literacy rate

Literacy in CD blocks of
Cooch Behar district
Cooch Behar Sadar subdivision
Cooch Behar I – 76.56%
Cooch Behar II – 81.39%
Dinhata subdivision
Dinhata I – 73.23%
Dinhata II – 72.33%
Sitai – 62.79%
Mathabhanga subdivision
Sitalkuchi – 70.34%
Mathabhanga I – 71.51%
Mathabhanga II – 72.68%
Tufanganj subdivision
Tufanganj I – 73.69%
Tufanganj II – 75.75%
Mekhliganj subdivision
Mekhliganj – 69.34%
Haldibari – 69.22%
2011 Census: CD Block Wise

Primary Census Abstract Data

=== Language and religion ===
Religion in Cooch Behar I CD block (2011)
Hinduism	66.00%
Islam	33.17%
Other or not stated	0.17%

In the 2011 Census of India, Hindus numbered 215,521 and formed 66.00% of the population of Cooch Behar I CD block. Muslims numbered 110,078 and formed 33.71% of the population. Christians numbered 541 and formed 0.17% of the population. Others numbered 418 and formed 0.13% of the population.

Languages of Cooch Behar I CD block (2011)
1. Bengali (95.7%)
2. Rajbongshi (2.20%)
3. 'Other' Bengali (0.90%)
4. Others (1.16%)

At the time of the 2011 census, 95.74% of the population spoke Bengali and 2.20% Rajbongshi as their first language. 0.90% were recorded as speaking 'Other' under Bengali.

== Rural poverty ==
Based on a study of the per capita consumption in rural and urban areas, using central sample data of NSS 55th Round 1999–2000, Cooch Behar district had a rural poverty ratio of 25.62%.

According to a World Bank report, as of 2012, 20-26% of the population of Cooch Behar, Birbhum, Nadia and Hooghly districts were below the poverty line, marginally higher than the level of poverty in West Bengal, which had an average 20% of the population below poverty line.

== Economy ==
=== Livelihood ===
Livelihood
in Cooch Behar I CD block
1. Cultivators (27.9%)
2. Agricultural labourers (32.4%)
3. Household industries (5.44%)
4. Other Workers (34.3%)

In the Cooch Behar I CD block in 2011, among the class of total workers, cultivators numbered 37,485 and formed 27.85%, agricultural labourers numbered 43,565 and formed 32.37%, household industry workers numbered 7,315 and formed 5.44% and other workers numbered 46,208 and formed 34.34%. Total workers numbered 134,573 and formed 41.21% of the total population, and non-workers numbered 191,985 and formed 58.79% of the population.

Note: In the census records a person is considered a cultivator, if the person is engaged in cultivation/ supervision of land owned by self/government/institution. When a person who works on another person's land for wages in cash or kind or share, is regarded as an agricultural labourer. Household industry is defined as an industry conducted by one or more members of the family within the household or village, and one that does not qualify for registration as a factory under the Factories Act. Other workers are persons engaged in some economic activity other than cultivators, agricultural labourers and household workers. It includes factory, mining, plantation, transport and office workers, those engaged in business and commerce, teachers, entertainment artistes and so on.

=== Infrastructure ===
There are 142 inhabited villages in the Cooch Behar I CD block, as per the District Census Handbook, Cooch Behar, 2011. 100% villages have power supply. 100% villages have drinking water supply. 30 villages (21.13%) have post offices. 141 villages (99.30%) have telephones (including landlines, public call offices and mobile phones). 93 villages (65.49%) have pucca (paved) approach roads and 76 villages (53.52%) have transport communication (includes bus service, rail facility and navigable waterways). 16 villages (11.27%) have agricultural credit societies and 10 villages (7.04%) have banks.

=== Agriculture ===
Agriculture is the primary mode of living in the district. The entire Cooch Behar district has fertile soil and around half of the cultivated land in the district is cropped twice or more. Paddy (rice) and jute are the largest producing crops, followed by potatoes, vegetables and pulses. There are 23 tea gardens on glided slopes. There are some coconut, areca nut and betel leaf plantations. 77.6% of the land holdings are marginal.

In 2012–13, there were 51 fertiliser depots, 2 seed stores and 64 fair price shops in the Cooch Behar I CD block.

In 2012–13, the Cooch Behar I CD block produced 38,493 tonnes of Aman paddy, the main winter crop, from 19,142 hectares, 36,211 tonnes of Boro paddy (spring crop) from 9,871 hectares, 298 tonnes of Aus paddy (summer crop) from 175 hectares, 8,576 tonnes of wheat from 3,413 hectares, 183 tonnes of maize from 75 hectares, 164,563 tonnes of jute from 11,899 hectares, 91,495 tonnes of potatoes from 3,265 hectares and 1,255 tonnes of sugar cane from 12 hectares. It also produced pulses and oilseeds.

In 2012–13, the total area irrigated in the Cooch Behar I CD block was 5,121 hectares, out of which 200 hectares were irrigated by private canal water, 355 hectares by tank water, 814 hectares by river lift irrigation, 314 hectares by deep tube wells, 2,304 hectares by shallow tube wells, 97 hectares by open dug wells, 1,037 hectares by other means.

=== Pisciculture ===
Being a river-bound district, pisciculture is an important economic activity in the Cooch Behar district. Almost all the rivers originating in the Himalayas have a lot of fish. The net area under effective pisciculture in 2010–11 in the Cooch Behar I CD block was 410.88 hectares. 12,875 persons were engaged in the profession and approximate annual production was 24,063 quintals.

=== Banking ===
In 2012–13, Cooch Behar I CD block had offices of 32 commercial banks and 8 gramin banks.

== Transport ==
Cooch Behar I CD block has 8 ferry services and 11 originating/ terminating bus routes.

The broad gauge Alipurduar-Bamanhat branch line passes through this block and there are stations at Dewanhat and Bhetaguri.

== Education ==
In 2012–13, Cooch Behar I CD block had 195 primary schools with 24,014 students, 29 middle schools with 8,972 students, 21 high schools with 19,600 students and 20 higher secondary schools with 18,990 students. Cooch Behar I CD block had 1 general degree college with 800 students, 5 technical/ professional institutions with 379 students and 624 institutions for special and non-formal education with 29,714 students.

See also – Education in India

According to the 2011 census, among the 142 inhabited villages in the Cooch Behar I CD block 13 villages did not have schools, 74 villages had two or more primary schools, 63 villages had at least 1 primary and 1 middle school and 45 villages had at least 1 middle and 1 secondary school.

Dewanhat Mahavidyalaya was established in 2007 at Dewanhat.

== Healthcare ==
In 2013, Cooch Behar I CD block had 1 block primary health centre, 2 primary health centres and 1 NGO/private nursing home with total 66 beds and 7 doctors (excluding private bodies). It had 46 family welfare subcentres. 11,213 patients were treated indoor and 340,811 patients were treated outdoor in the hospitals, health centres and subcentres of the CD block.

Dewanhat Rural Hospital, with 30 beds at Dewanhat, is the major government medical facility in the Cooch Behar I CD block. There are primary health centres at Putimari Phuleswari (PO Patpushu) (with 10 beds) and Chilkirhat (with 6 beds).
