= Uttar Banga Krishi Viswavidyalaya =

Public Agricultural University in West Bengal

Uttar Banga Krishi Vishwavidyalaya
- Motto: Where wisdom is free
- Type: Public Agricultural University
- Established: 1 February 2001; 25 years ago
- Accreditation: ICAR
- Academic affiliations: UGC; AIU
- Budget: ₹66.98 crore (US$7.0 million) (2024–25 est.)
- Chancellor: Governor of West Bengal
- Vice-Chancellor: Debabrata Basu
- Academic staff: 131 (2025)
- Students: 886 (2025)
- Undergraduates: 690 (2025)
- Doctoral students: 196 (2025)
- Location: Pundibari, Cooch Behar, West Bengal, India; 26°24′16″N 89°23′02″E
- Campus: Rural
- Colours: Green
- Website: www.ubkv.ac.in

Uttar Banga Krishi Vishwavidyalaya (English: North Bengal Agricultural University) is a public state agricultural university in Pundibari about 11 km north-west of Cooch Behar, West Bengal, India. It offers degree courses in Agricultural Engineering, Agriculture and Horticulture. It was established in 2001 by an Act of the West Bengal legislature.

== Academics ==
=== Courses ===
Uttar Banga Krishi Viswavidyalaya offers the following courses:

- Undergraduate: B.Sc in Agriculture, B.Sc in Horticulture, and B.Tech in Agricultural Engineering.
- Postgraduate: M.Sc in Agriculture, M.Sc in Horticulture, and M.Sc in Forestry
- Doctor of Philosophy: Ph.D. in Agriculture, Ph.D. in Horticulture, and Ph.D. in Forestry

=== Admission ===
Students are admitted each year in the undergraduate courses of the university (B.Sc in Agriculture and Horticulture) on the basis of their performance in the higher secondary (10+2) examination. One has to take the WBJEE examination for admission in the B.Tech Agricultural Engineering course. For admission in postgraduate and doctoral level courses, one has to take an entrance examination either conducted by the university or by a national agency like ICAR, UGC, etc.

=== Central Library ===
There is a central library at the main campus of the university at Pundibari. It has collections of more than 25000 books. There are also small unit libraries at different research stations of the university.

=== Ranking and Accreditation ===
Uttar Banga Krishi Viswavidyalaya holds 55th rank in the ICAR agricultural university ranking list 2019, India.

Uttar Banga Krishi Viswavidyalaya was ranked 40th in India by the NIRF (National Institutional Ranking Framework) in the architecture ranking in 2024.

University rankings

Architecture – India
- NIRF (2024): 40

== Organisation and Administration ==
=== Governance ===
The chancellor of the university is the Governor of West Bengal. The vice-chancellor of the Uttar Banga Krishi Vishwavidyalaya is the chief executive officer of the university. Debabrata Basu is the current vice-chancellor.

=== Faculties and Departments ===
Departments of the Uttar Banga Krishi Viswavidyalaya are organized into three faculties.

Faculties	Departments and Centres
Faculty of Agriculture	Agricultural Economics
Faculty of Agriculture	Agricultural Entomology
Faculty of Agriculture	Agricultural Extension
Faculty of Agriculture	Agricultural Statistics
Faculty of Agriculture	Agronomy
Faculty of Agriculture	Biochemistry
Faculty of Agriculture	Genetics and Plant Breeding
Faculty of Agriculture	Plant Pathology
Faculty of Agriculture	Soil Science and Agricultural Chemistry
Faculty of Agriculture	Seed Science and Technology
Faculty of Horticulture	Pomology and Post Harvest Technology
Faculty of Horticulture	Vegetable and Spice Crops
Faculty of Horticulture	Floriculture, Medicinal and Aromatic Plants
Faculty of Horticulture	Plantation Crops and Processing
Faculty of Horticulture	Forestry
Faculty of Technology	Agricultural engineering

=== Directorate of Extension Education ===
There are five Krishi Vigyan Kendras (KVK) under this university:

- Cooch Behar Krishi Vigyan Kendra at the Pundibari, Cooch Behar
- Darjeeling Krishi Vigyan Kendra at the Kalimpong, Darjeeling
- Dakshin Dinajpur Krishi Vigyan Kendra at the Majhian, Dakshin Dinajpur
- Uttar Dinajpur Krishi Vigyan Kendra at the Chopra, Uttar Dinajpur
- Malda Krishi Vigyan Kendra at the Ratua, Malda

=== Farm Facilities ===
Uttar Banga Krishi Viswavidyalaya has a well-developed Agricultural Experimental Farm of about 300 acres at Pundibari, Cooch Behar, West Bengal.
