= Cooch Behar Sadar subdivision =

- Subdivision
- Interactive map of Cooch Behar Sadar subdivision
- Coordinates: 26.19°N 89.26°E
- Country: India
- State: West Bengal
- District: Cooch Behar
- Headquarters: Cooch Behar

Languages
  - Official: Bengali, English
- Time zone: UTC+5:30 (IST)
- ISO 3166 code: IN-WB
- Vehicle registration: WB
- Website: wb.gov.in

Cooch Behar Sadar subdivision is a subdivision of the Cooch Behar district in the state of West Bengal, India.

== Subdivisions ==
Cooch Behar district is divided into the following administrative subdivisions:

Subdivision	Headquarters	Area km^{2}	Population (2011)	Rural Population % (2011)	Urban Population % (2011)
Mekhliganj	Mekhliganj	459.78	282,750	90.09	9.91
Mathabhanga	Mathabhanga	896.26	654,831	96.35	3.65
Cooch Behar Sadar	Cooch Behar	754.84	748,394	77.92	22.08
Tufanganj	Tufanganj	586.44	456,319	93.02	6.97
Dinhata	Dinhata	692.02	676,792	94.02	5.98
Cooch Behar district	Cooch Behar	3,387.00	2,819,026	89.73	10.27

Places in the Cooch Behar Sadar subdivision in Cooch Behar district
CT: census town, M: municipal town, R: rural/ urban centre, H: historical/ religious centre
Owing to space constraints in the small map, the actual locations in a larger map may vary slightly

=== Administrative units ===
Cooch Behar Sadar subdivision has 1 police station, 2 community development blocks, 2 panchayat samitis, 28 gram panchayats, 259 mouzas, 253 inhabited villages, 1 municipality and 8 census towns. The municipality is: Cooch Behar. The census towns are: Kharimala Khagrabari, Guriahati, Dhaliabari, Baneswar, Khagrabari, Baisguri, Chakchaka and Takagachh. The subdivision has its headquarters at Cooch Behar.

== Police stations ==
Police stations in the Darjeeling Sadar subdivision have the following features and jurisdiction:

Police Station	Area covered km^{2}	International border	Inter-state border km	Municipal Town	CD block
Kotwali	747.47	-	-	Cooch Behar	Cooch Behar I, Cooch Behar II
Pundibari	n/a	-	-	-	n/a
Sadar Women	n/a	-	-	-	n/a

=== Blocks ===
Community development blocks in the Cooch Behar Sadar subdivision are:

CD block	Headquarters	Area km^{2}	Population (2011)	SC %	ST %	Literacy rate %	Census Towns
Cooch Behar I	Ghughumari	361.17	326,558	38.77	0.38	76.56	3
Cooch Behar II	Kalarayerkuthi	385.38	343,901	44.97	1.00	81.39	5

== Gram panchayats ==
The subdivision contains 28 gram panchayats under 2 community development blocks:

- Cooch Behar I block consists of 15 gram panchayats, viz. Chandamari, Falimari, Haribhanga, Patchhara, Chilkirhat, Ghughumari, Jiranpur, Putimari–Fuleswari, Dauaguri, Guriahati–I, Moyamari, Deoanhat, Guriahati–II, Panisala and Suktabari.
- Cooch Behar II block consists of 13 gram panchayats, viz. Ambari, Dhangdhinguri, Madhupur, Takagachh–Rajarhat, Baneswar, Gopalpur, Marichbari–Kholta, Bararangras, Khagrabari, Patlakhawa, Chakchaka, Khapaidanga and Pundibari.

== Education ==
The table below presents a comprehensive picture of the education scenario in Cooch Behar district, with data for the year 2012–13.

Subdivision	Primary School		Middle School		High School		Higher Secondary School		General College, Univ		Technical / Professional Instt		Non-formal Education	
Subdivision	Institution	Student	Institution	Student	Institution	Student	Institution	Student	Institution	Student	Institution	Student	Institution	Student
Mekhliganj	216	24,210	52	27,782	4	4,012	21	27,680	2	2858	1	55	456	25,387
Mathabhanga	432	52,235	80	52,338	14	113,452	42	61,315	4	3,910	8	578	1,171	70,179
Cooch Behar Sadar	441	61,375	47	15,322	33	35,204	56	59,614	6	8,934	29	3,749	1,195	61,733
Tufanganj	310	31,205	72	45,231	46	17,510	30	38,274	2	2,871	3	275	950	36,293
Dinhata	431	42,213	46	14,723	27	31,836	29	44,946	1	3,492	4	381	1,228	1,950
Cooch Behar district	1,830	211,247	297	154,943	94	102,014	178	231,829	15	22,065	45	5,038	5,000	223,323

Note: Primary schools include junior basic schools; middle schools, high schools and higher secondary schools include madrasahs; technical schools include junior technical schools, junior government polytechnics, industrial technical institutes, industrial training centres, nursing training institutes etc.; technical and professional colleges include engineering colleges, medical colleges, para-medical institutes, management colleges, teachers training and nursing training colleges, law colleges, art colleges, music colleges etc. Special and non-formal education centres include sishu siksha kendras, madhyamik siksha kendras, centres of Rabindra mukta vidyalaya, recognised Sanskrit tols, institutions for the blind and other handicapped persons, Anganwadi centres, reformatory schools etc.

=== Educational institutions ===
The following institutions are located in Cooch Behar Sadar subdivision:

- Cooch Behar Panchanan Barma University was established at Cooch Behar in 2012.
- Uttar Banga Krishi Vishwavidyalaya initially started functioning as a satellite campus of Bidhan Chandra Krishi Vishwavidyalaya and was formally established in 2001 at Pundibari.
- Cooch Behar Government Engineering College was established in 2016 at Cooch Behar.
- Acharya Brojendra Nath Seal College (formerly Victoria College) was established in 1888 at Cooch Behar.
- Cooch Behar College was established at Cooch Behar in 1970.
- Thakur Panchanan Mahila Mahavidyalaya was established at Cooch Behar in 1981.
- Dewanhat Mahavidyalaya was established in 2007 at Dewanhat.
- Baneswar Sarathibala Mahavidyalaya was established at Baneswar in 2009.

== Healthcare ==
The table below (all data in numbers) presents an overview of the medical facilities available and patients treated in the hospitals, health centres and sub-centres in 2013 in Cooch Behar district, with data for the year 2012–13.:

Subdivision	Health & Family Welfare Deptt, WB				Other State Govt Deptts	Local bodies	Central Govt Deptts / PSUs	NGO / Private Nursing Homes	Total	Total Number of Beds	Total Number of Doctors*	Indoor Patients	Outdoor Patients
Subdivision	Hospitals	Rural Hospitals	Block Primary Health Centres	Primary Health Centres	Other State Govt Deptts	Local bodies	Central Govt Deptts / PSUs	NGO / Private Nursing Homes	Total	Total Number of Beds	Total Number of Doctors*	Indoor Patients	Outdoor Patients
Mekhliganj	1	1	1	5	-	-	-	1	9	255	32	23,850	185,720
Mathabhanga	1	-	2	7	-	-	-	3	13	297	45	44,730	712,513
Cooch Behar Sadar	4	-	2	7	1	-	2	9	25	1,030	115	96,233	560,813
Tufanganj	1	-	2	5	1	-	-	3	12	266	38	46,232	560,813
Dinhata	1	-	3	7	-	-	-	3	14	429	50	62,943	624,514
Cooch Behar district	8	1	10	31	2	-	2	19	73	2,277	280	273,988	3,145,902

.* Excluding nursing homes.

=== Medical facilities ===
Medical facilities in the Cooch Behar Sadar subdivision are as follows:

Hospitals: (Name, location, beds)

- M.J.N. Hospital (District Hospital), Cooch Behar M, 400 beds
- Cooch Behar Jail Hospital, Cooch Behar M, 10 beds
- Cooch Behar Police Hospital, Cooch Behar M, 30 beds
- J.D.Hospital (TB), Cooch Behar II, 120 beds
- New Cooch Behar Railway Hospital, Cooch Behar II, 2 beds

Rural Hospitals: (Name, CD block, location, beds)

- Dewanhat Rural Hospital, Cooch Behar I CD block, Dewanhat, 30 beds
- Pundibari Rural Hospital, Cooch Behar II block, Pundibari, 30 beds

Primary Health Centres : (CD block-wise)(CD block, PHC location, beds)

- Cooch Behar I CD block: Putimari Phuleswari (PO Patpushu) (10), Chilkirhat (6)
- Cooch Behar II CD block: Patlakhawa (6), Bokalir Math (4), Gopalpur (10), Kaljani (4)

== Legislative segments ==
As per order of the Delimitation Commission in respect of the delimitation of constituencies in the West Bengal, the area under Cooch Behar–II block will constitute the Cooch Behar Uttar assembly constituency of West Bengal. The Cooch Behar municipality and nine gram panchayats of Cooch Behar–I block, viz. Chandamari, Chilkirhat, Falimari, Ghughumari, Haribhanga, Moyamari, Patchhara, Putimari–Fuleswari and Sutkabari will form the Cooch Behar Dakshin assembly constituency. The other six gram panchayats of Cooch Behar–I block, viz. Jiranpur, Dauaguri, Guriahati–I, Deoanhat, Guriahati–II and Panisala will be part of Natabari assembly constituency. Cooch Behar Uttar constituency will be reserved for Scheduled castes (SC) candidates. All these three assembly constituencies will be part of Cooch Behar (Lok Sabha constituency), which will be reserved for SC candidates.
