= Nakkatigachhi =

Nakkatigachh
- Village
- Location in West Bengal, India Nakkatigachh (India)
- Coordinates: 26.2705°N 89.6556°E
- Country: India
- State: West Bengal
- District: Cooch Behar

Population (2011)
  - Total: 4,243
- Time zone: UTC+5:30 (IST)
- PIN: 736159
- Telephone/STD code: 03582
- Vehicle registration: WB
- Lok Sabha constituency: Alipurduars
- Vidhan Sabha constituency: Tufanganj
- Website: coochbehar.gov.in

Nakkatigachhi is a village in the Tufanganj I CD block in the Tufanganj subdivision of the Cooch Behar district in West Bengal, India

== Geography ==
Places in the Tufanganj and Dinhata subdivisions (except Sitai CD block) in Cooch Behar district
CT: census town, M: municipal town, R: rural/ urban centre, H: historical/ religious centre
Owing to space constraints in the small map, the actual locations in a larger map may vary slightly

=== Location ===
Nakkatgachhi is located at 26.2705°N 89.6556°E.

=== Area overview ===
The map alongside shows the eastern part of the district. In Tufanganj subdivision 6.97% of the population lives in the urban areas and 93.02% lives in the rural areas. In Dinhata subdivision 5.98% of the population lives in the urban areas and 94.02% lives in the urban areas. The entire district forms the flat alluvial flood plains of mighty rivers.

Note: The map alongside presents some of the notable locations in the subdivisions. All places marked in the map are linked in the larger full screen map.

== Demographics ==
As per the 2011 Census of India, Nakkatigachh had a total population of 4,243. There were 2,213 (52%) males and 2,030 (48%) females. There were 488 persons in the age range of 0 to 6 years. The total number of literate people in Nakkatagachhi was 2,495 (66.44% of the population over 6 years).

== Culture ==
As per local beliefs, Sukladwaj or Chilarai, (1510-1571), younger brother of Nara Narayan, of the Koch dynasty, had established an idol of Sandeswar Shiva in this village. However, it is not clear as to whether he built a temple. Some opinions point to Maharaja Pran Narayan or Najirdeo Khagendra Narayan as builders of the temple, and yet others think that the temple was built by Chilarai, and later modified/ improved upon by Pran Narayan and Khagendra Narayan. It is also possible that the temple was so badly damaged that Khagendra Narayan rebuilt it. The present brick-built temple with a sheet ‘charchala’ is not more than 200–250 years old, but remnants of a broken temple indicate of there being an earlier temple in the traditional Cooch Behar style. The Shiva linga continues to be worshipped daily and this temple is under the Cooch Behar Debuttor Sangstha.
