= Bara Kodali =

- Village
- Location in West Bengal, India Bara Kodali (India)
- Coordinates: 26.3045°N 89.7119°E
- Country: India
- State: West Bengal
- District: Cooch Behar

Population (2011)
  - Total: 5,008
- Time zone: UTC+5:30 (IST)
- Telephone/STD code: 03582
- Vehicle registration: WB
- Lok Sabha constituency: Alipurduars
- Vidhan Sabha constituency: Tufangana
- Website: coochbehar.gov.in

Bara Kodali is a village and a gram panchayat in the Tufanganj II CD block in the Tufanganj subdivision of the Cooch Behar district in West Bengal, India.

== Geography ==
Places in the Tufanganj and Dinhata subdivisions (except Sitai CD block) in Cooch Behar district
CT: census town, M: municipal town, R: rural/ urban centre, H: historical/ religious centre
Owing to space constraints in the small map, the actual locations in a larger map may vary slightly

=== Location ===
Bara Kodali is located at 26.3045°N 89.7119°E.

Bara Kodali I and Bara Kodali II are gram panchayats in the Tufanganj II CD block.

=== Area overview ===
The map alongside shows the eastern part of the district. In Tufanganj subdivision 6.97% of the population lives in the urban areas and 93.02% lives in the rural areas. In Dinhata subdivision 5.98% of the population lives in the urban areas and 94.02% in the urban areas. The district forms the flat alluvial flood plains of mighty rivers.

Note: The map alongside presents some of the notable locations in the subdivisions. All places marked in the map are linked in the larger full screen map.

== Demographics ==
As per the 2011 Census of India, Bara Kodali had a total population of 5,008. There were 2,574 (51%) males and 2,435 (49%) females. There were 535 persons in the age range of 0 to 6 years. The total number of literate people in Bara Kodali was 3,346 (74.79% of the population over 6 years).

== Culture ==
Dameswar Shiv Mandir is housed in a small structure with a tin roof. The Shiva linga is worshipped as Great Mahadev. Locals believe that the Shiva linga was established here by Sukladwaj or Chilarai, (1510–1571), younger brother of Nara Narayan, of the Koch dynasty . However, there is no trace of the original temple. It is under the Cooch Behar Debuttor Sangstha.
