= Andaranfulbari =

- Village
- Location in West Bengal, India Andaranfulbari (India)
- Coordinates: 26.3345°N 89.6599°E
- Country: India
- State: West Bengal
- District: Cooch Behar

Population (2011)
  - Total: 18,261
- Time zone: UTC+5:30 (IST)
- PIN: 736160
- Telephone/STD code: 03582
- Vehicle registration: WB
- Lok Sabha constituency: Cooch Behar, Alipurduars
- Vidhan Sabha constituency: Natabari, Tufanganj
- Website: coochbehar.gov.in

Andaranfulbari (also spelled Andaran Phulbari) is a village and a gram panchayat in the Tufanganj I CD block in the Tufanganj subdivision of the Cooch Behar district in West Bengal, India.

== Geography ==
Places in the Tufanganj and Dinhata subdivisions (except Sitai CD block) in Cooch Behar district
CT: census town, M: municipal town, R: rural/ urban centre, H: historical/ religious centre
Owing to space constraints in the small map, the actual locations in a larger map may vary slightly

=== Location ===
Andaranfubari is located at 26.3345°N 89.6599°E.

Andaranfulbari I and Andaranfulbari II are gram panchayats in the Tufanganj I CD block.

=== Area overview ===
The map alongside shows the eastern part of the district. In the Tufanganj subdivision 6.97% of the population lives in urban areas and 93.02% in rural areas. In the Dinhata subdivision 5.98% of the population lives in the urban areas and 94.02% lives in the urban areas. The entire district forms the flat alluvial flood plains of mighty rivers.

Note: The map alongside presents some notable locations in the subdivisions. All places marked in the map are linked in the larger full screen map.

== Demographics ==
As per the 2011 Census of India, Andaran Phulbari had a total population of 18,261. There were 9,445 (52%) males and 8,816 (48%) females. There were 1,725 persons in the age range of 0 to 6 years. The total number of literate people in Andaran Phulbari was 12,820 (77.53% of the population over 6 years).

== Historical ruins ==
The ruins of an old fort, known as Chilarair Kot, are located here. Sukladwaj or Chilarai, (1510–1571), younger brother of Nara Narayan, of the Koch dynasty, had established the fort.

According to historian Harendranth Chowdhury, Chilarai lived in a wood or bamboo built complex in the fort well protected by high walls. Possibly it earlier was a mecha ghar, a temporary structure built of wood or bamboo, to engage in warfare, in the 16-17th century, close to a highway. Chilarai had built several such mecha ghars along the road to Assam for use in warfare against the king of Assam. Chilarai was very fond of the mecha ghar at Andaran Fulbari, on the banks of the Raidak River. It is said that the name of the place earlier was only Fulbari, and the prefix was added because the fort housed the andar mahal (family quarters) of Chilarai.

There is no trace of the structures built of wood or bamboo, but the remains of the surrounding protection walls are still there. The earthen surrounding walls were strengthened at the base with lime and brickbats. It is 7 feet high and 6 feet wide, but it is believed to have been higher in the earlier days. In the north and south it is 270 feet long, and in the east and west it is 210 feet long. There is a 5 feet gap in the east, which possibly was the entrance. The andar mahal probably had a separate entrance. The land inside the fort measures 56,700 square feet (5,270 m^{2}).

Chilarai had once hidden the Assamese Vaishnavism preacher Sankardev in his fort, to protect him from the wrath of his elder brother, Nara Narayan. Chilarai was possibly influenced by the sage at Andaran Fulbari and later converted to Vaishnavism. It may be mentioned here that although Narayana was the family deity of the Koch dynasty they followed Shaktism and were worshippers of goddess Kamteswari.

The ruins of another fort, known as Chilarair Bara Kot, is there at Kamat Phulbari, 2.4 kilometres (1.5 mi) away.
