= Fulbari, Bangladesh =

Fulbari
- Village
- Interactive map of Fulbari
- Coordinates: 23°14′N 89°57′E
- Country: Bangladesh
- Division: Dhaka Division
- District: Madaripur District
- Upazila: Rajoir Upazila

Area
  - Total: 1.4 sq mi (3.6 km^{2})

Population
  - Total: 2,500
  - Density: 2,100/sq mi (800/km^{2})
- Time zone: UTC+6 (Bangladesh Time)

Fulbari is a village in Madaripur District, Bangladesh, part of Rajoir Upazila. The village covers an area of 2.5 km^{2}, and is bordered by the villages of Gojaria, Mridhabari, Mohismari, and chamta.

Fulbari under Rajoir Union parishad was established in 1870. The village consists of one wards. The village has one primary school, Ten Temples, one Post primary school, and few community schools.
