= Kamat Phulbari =

- Census Town
- Location in West Bengal, India Kamat Phulbari (India)
- Coordinates: 26.3037°N 89.6685°E
- Country: India
- State: West Bengal
- District: Cooch Behar

Area
  - Total: 2.53 km^{2} (0.98 sq mi)

Population (2011)
  - Total: 5,339
  - Density: 2,110/km^{2} (5,470/sq mi)
- Time zone: UTC+5:30 (IST)
- PIN: 736159
- Telephone/STD code: 03582
- Vehicle registration: WB
- Lok Sabha constituency: Cooch Behar
- Vidhan Sabha constituency: Tufanganj
- Website: coochbehar.gov.in

Kamat Phulbari is a census town in the Tufanganj I CD block in the Cooch Behar Sadar subdivision of the Cooch Behar district in the state of West Bengal, India.

== Geography ==
Places in the Tufanganj and Dinhata subdivisions (except Sitai CD block) in Cooch Behar district
CT: census town, M: municipal town, R: rural/ urban centre, H: historical/ religious centre
Owing to space constraints in the small map, the actual locations in a larger map may vary slightly

=== Location ===
Kamat Phulbari is located at 26.3037°N 89.6685°E.

=== Area overview ===
The map alongside shows the eastern part of the district. In Tufanganj subdivision 6.97% of the population lives in the urban areas and 93.02% lives in the rural areas. In Dinhata subdivision 5.98% of the population lives in the urban areas and 94.02% in the urban areas. The entire district forms the flat alluvial flood plains of mighty rivers.

Note: The map alongside presents some of the notable locations in the subdivisions. All places marked in the map are linked in the larger full screen map.

== Demographics ==
As per the 2011 Census of India, Kamat Phulbarii had a total population of 5,339. There were 2,743 (51%) males and 2,596 (49%) females. There were 493 persons in the age range of 0 to 6 years. The total number of literate people in Kamat Phulbari was 3,667 (75.67% of the population over 6 years).

== Infrastructure ==
According to the District Census Handbook 2011, Koch Bihar, Kamat Phulbari (P) covered an area of 2.53 km^{2}. Among the civic amenities, it had 25 km roads with open drains, the protected water supply involved overhead tank, tap water from treated sources, hand pumps. It had 700 electric connections, 24 electric light points. Among the medical facilities it had 1 dispensary/ health centre, 5 medicine shops. Among the educational facilities it had 2 primary schools, 2 middle schools, 1 high school, 1 higher secondary school, the nearest general degree college at Tufanganj 2 km away. It had 1 non-formal education centre (Sarva Shiksha Abhiyan). One important commodity it produced was handloom items.

== Historical ruins ==
The ruins of an old fort, known as Chilarair Bara Kot, are located here. Sukladwaj or Chilarai, (1510-1571), younger brother of Nara Narayan, of the Koch dynasty, had established the fort.

It was a large fort with an earthen surrounding wall having lime and brickbat base. At present it is 8 feet high and 6 feet wide. There is a 5 feet gap in the eastern wall, which possibly was the entrance. One can see brick pieces lying all over the place leading to the conclusion that structures were brick-built. Some bricks are also stored at some places. The fort was located on a piece of land higher than that of the surrounding areas. It was protected by the Kharkharia and Chakchakia rivers on three sides. From the bricks found at the place, the architectural style and other factors, it is presumed that the fort was built in the middle of the 16th century, at around the same time when Chilarair Kot came up at Andaranfulbari, 2.4 kilometres (1.5 mi) away.
