= Boxirhat =

Boxirhat may refer to:

- Boxirhat Ward
- Boxirhat railway station
