= Airani Chitalia =

- Village
- Location in West Bengal, India Airani Chitalia (India)
- Coordinates: 26.3375°N 89.5529°E
- Country: India
- State: West Bengal
- District: Cooch Behar

Population (2011)
  - Total: 5,036
- Time zone: UTC+5:30 (IST)
- PIN: 736156
- Telephone/STD code: 03582
- Vehicle registration: WB
- Lok Sabha constituency: Cooch Behar
- Vidhan Sabha constituency: Natabari
- Website: coochbehar.gov.in

Airani Chitalia is a village in the Tufanganj I CD block in the Tufanganj subdivision of the Cooch Behar district in West Bengal, India

== Geography ==
Places in the Tufanganj and Dinhata subdivisions (except Sitai CD block) in Cooch Behar district
CT: census town, M: municipal town, R: rural/ urban centre, H: historical/ religious centre
Owing to space constraints in the small map, the actual locations in a larger map may vary slightly

=== Location ===
Airani Chitalia is located at 26.3375°N 89.5529°E.

=== Area overview ===
The map alongside shows the eastern part of the district. In Tufanganj subdivision 6.97% of the population lives in the urban areas and 93.02% lives in the rural areas. In Dinhata subdivision 5.98% of the population lives in the urban areas and 94.02% lives in the urban areas. The entire district forms the flat alluvial flood plains of mighty rivers.

Note: The map alongside presents some of the notable locations in the subdivisions. All places marked in the map are linked in the larger full screen map.

== Demographics ==
As per the 2011 Census of India, Airani Chitalia had a total population of 5,036. There were 2,604 (52%) males and 2,432 (48%) females. There were 546 persons in the age range of 0 to 6 years. The total number of literate people in Airan Chitalia was 3,669 (81.71% of the population over 6 years).

== Culture ==
Among the temples of Airani Chitalia, the temple of Chandithakurani is famous. The original temple was erected by a Nazir of the Cooch Behar State (possibly by Khagendra Narayan). In those days the village was called Chithalia Dalbari. The original temple seems to have been destroyed long ago and a new one came up in its place. The present temple is a tin-roofed structure.
