= Arghya Roy Pradhan =

Indian politician

Chairman of Changrabandha Development Authority
- Incumbent
- Assumed office 2017

Member of the West Bengal Legislative Assembly for Mekliganj
- In office 2016–2021
- Preceded by: Paresh Chandra Adhikary
- Succeeded by: Paresh Chandra Adhikary

Member of the West Bengal Legislative Assembly for Tufanganj
- In office 2011–2016
- Preceded by: Alaka Barman
- Succeeded by: Fazal Karim Miah

Personal details
- Born: 1 May 1971 (age 55)
- Party: Bharatiya Janata Party
- Children: 1
- Relatives: Lt Ashoke Roy Pradhan
- Occupation: Politician

Arghya Roy Pradhan is an Indian Politician who currently serves as Chairman of Changrabandha Development Authority. He is basically from the state of West Bengal. He is a two term member of the West Bengal Legislative Assembly.

== Constituency ==
He represented the Tufanganj from 2011-2016 and Mekliganj in 2016.

== Political Party ==
Argha was member of Forward Block. He joined Trinamool Congress before 2004 Lok Sabha election with his father Amar Roy Pradhan. He is from the All India Trinamool Congress.

== Personal life ==
His father Amar Roy Pradhan was an eight time Member of the Indian Parliament from Cooch Behar. His wife Purabi Roy Prodhan is the president of Haldibari town block Trinamool Congress and also councillor of Haldibari Municipality.
