= Bakshirhat =

- Town
- Location in West Bengal, India Bakshirhat (India)
- Coordinates: 26.328199°N 89.758893°E
- Country: India
- State: West Bengal
- District: Cooch Behar
- Time zone: UTC+5:30 (IST)
- PIN: 736131 (Bakshirhat)
- Telephone/STD code: 03582
- Vehicle registration: WB
- Lok Sabha constituency: Alipurduars
- Vidhan Sabha constituency: Tufanganj
- Website: coochbehar.gov.in

Bakshirhat is a Town in the Tufanganj II CD block in the Tufanganj subdivision of the Cooch Behar district in the state of West Bengal, India.

== Geography ==
Places in the Tufanganj and Dinhata subdivisions (except Sitai CD block) in Cooch Behar district
CT: census town, M: municipal town, R: rural/ urban centre, H: historical/ religious centre
Owing to space constraints in the small map, the actual locations in a larger map may vary slightly

=== Location ===
Bakshirhat is located at 26.328199°N 89.758893°E.

Bakshirhat is not identified in 2011 census record as a separate inhabited place but the place has a post office and a police station by that name. Census maps do not show Bakshirhat police station, but it is mentioned in Cooch Behar police records. Google maps show both Chhota Laukuthi and Bakshirhat as adjacent places. (Please see references given below)

=== Area overview ===
The map alongside shows the eastern part of the district. In Tufanganj subdivision, 6.97% of the population lives in the urban areas and 93.02% in the rural areas. In Dinhata subdivision 5.98% of the population lives in the urban areas and 94.02% in the urban areas. The entire district forms the flat alluvial flood plains of mighty rivers.

Note: The map alongside presents some of the notable locations in the subdivisions. All places marked in the map are linked in the larger full screen map.

== Civic administration ==
=== Police station ===
There is a police station at Bakshirhat.

== Transport ==
There is a station Boxirhat Railway Station on the New Cooch Behar-Golokganj branch line. Apart from local connections, there are trains such as Siliguri-Dhubri DEMU which passes through the Dooars.

== Education ==
Bakshirhat Mahavidyalaya was established in 2005. Affiliated with the Cooch Behar Panchanan Barma University, it offers honours courses in Bengali, English, Sanskrit, philosophy, history and geography, and a general course in arts.

== Healthcare ==
Bakshirhat Block Primary Health Centre, with 10 beds at Bakshirhat, is the major government medical facility in the Tufanganj II CD block.
