= Bhuchungmari =

- Village
- Location in West Bengal, India Bhuchungmari (India)
- Coordinates: 26.3935°N 89.5707°E
- Country: India
- State: West Bengal
- District: Cooch Behar

Population (2011)
  - Total: 1,541
- Time zone: UTC+5:30 (IST)
- Telephone/STD code: 03582
- Vehicle registration: WB
- Lok Sabha constituency: Cooch Behar
- Vidhan Sabha constituency: Natabari
- Website: coochbehar.gov.in

Bhuchungmari is a village in the Tufanganj I CD block in the Tufanganj subdivision of the Cooch Behar district in West Bengal, India

== Geography ==
Places in the Tufanganj and Dinhata subdivisions (except Sitai CD block) in Cooch Behar district
CT: census town, M: municipal town, R: rural/ urban centre, H: historical/ religious centre
Owing to space constraints in the small map, the actual locations in a larger map may vary slightly

=== Location ===
Bhuchungmari is located at 26.3935°N 89.5707°E.

=== Area overview ===
The map alongside shows the eastern part of the district. In Tufanganj subdivision 6.97% of the population lives in the urban areas and 93.02% lives in the rural areas. In Dinhata subdivision 5.98% of the population lives in the urban areas and 94.02% lives in the urban areas. The entire district forms the flat alluvial flood plains of mighty rivers.

Note: The map alongside presents some of the notable locations in the subdivisions. All places marked in the map are linked in the larger full screen map.

== Demographics ==
As per the 2011 Census of India, Bhuchungmari had a total population of 1,541. There were 792 (51%) males and 748 (49%) females. There were 211 persons in the age range of 0 to 6 years. The total number of literate people in Bhuchungmari was 955 (71.80% of the population over 6 years).

== Culture ==
The Balarama temple is a simple structure with bell metal idols inside. Along with the worship of Balarama, Krishna, Ganesha and Narugopal are also worshipped. Special festivities mark Rath Yatra, Janmastami and Dolyatra. Although it is a broken temple it is under the Cooch Behar Debuttor Sangstha. The ruins of the earlier temple is there just opposite the existing temple.
