= Amar Roy Pradhan =

Indian politician (1930–2013)

Amar Roy Pradhan MP

Member of the Indian Parliament for Cooch Behar
- In office 1977–2004
- Preceded by: Benoy Krishna Daschowdhury
- Succeeded by: Hiten Barman

Member of the Legislative Assembly for Mekliganj
- In office 1962–1971
- Preceded by: Prasanta Chatterjee
- Succeeded by: Mihir Kumar Roy

Personal details
- Born: 15 August 1930 Barashashi, Dinajpur District, Bengal Presidency, British India (now in Bangladesh)
- Died: 3 July 2013 (aged 82) Jalpaiguri, West Bengal
- Party: All India Forward Bloc
- Spouse: Lt Santilata Roy Pradhan
- Children: Lt Ashoke Roy Pradhan and Arghya Roy Pradhan
- Education: Undergraduate
- Occupation: Member of Parliament
- Profession: Politician, Social Worker

Amar Roy Pradhan or Amarendra Nath Roy Pradhan (15 August 1930 – 3 July 2013) was an Indian politician from All India Forward Bloc party. He remained MP from Cooch Behar Lok Sabha constituency eight times from 1977 to 1999, prior to which he was member of West Bengal Legislative Assembly MLA from Mekhliganj thrice (1962–1971).

== Early life and background ==
Amarendra Nath Roy Pradhan was born on 15 August 1930 to Talendranath Roy Pradhan at Barashashi, Dinajpur District (now in Bangladesh). He studied at Victoria College, Cooch Behar (then affiliated with University of Calcutta), followed by A.C. College, Jalpaiguri, West Bengal.

== Career ==
Pradhan started his political career at state-level, and was elected to the West Bengal Legislative Assembly from Mekhliganj three times, 1962, 1967 and 1977.

He was elected to the Lok Sabha from Cooch Behar Lok Sabha constituency eight consecutive times from 1977 to 1999.

He also published a number of books, including Upeksit Uttarbange, Sona Sonapat, Garibi Hatao Ekti Slogan Matra (all in Bengali), and Forward towards Mighty Peasants Struggle, and Rule of Jungle (English).

== Death ==
He died on 3 July 2013 at a nursing home in Jalpaiguri, at the age of 82. He was survived by two sons. His wife Santilata Roy Pradhan died prior to him. Arghya Roy Pradhan, his younger son, became a Trinamool Congress MLA in West Bengal state assembly from the Tufanganj constituency in 2011.
