= Chhota Laukuthi =

- Census Town
- Location in West Bengal, India Chhota Laukuthi (India)
- Coordinates: 26.331199°N 89.771893°E
- Country: India
- State: West Bengal
- District: Cooch Behar

Area
  - Total: 0.6863 km^{2} (0.2650 sq mi)

Population (2011)
  - Total: 5,480
  - Density: 7,980/km^{2} (20,700/sq mi)
- Time zone: UTC+5:30 (IST)
- PIN: 736131 (Bakshirhat)
- Telephone/STD code: 03582
- Vehicle registration: WB
- Lok Sabha constituency: Alipurduars
- Vidhan Sabha constituency: Tufanganj
- Website: coochbehar.gov.in

Chhota Laukuthi is a census town in the Tufanganj II CD block in the Tufanganj subdivision of the Cooch Behar district in the state of West Bengal, India.

== Geography ==
Places in the Tufanganj and Dinhata subdivisions (except Sitai CD block) in Cooch Behar district
CT: census town, M: municipal town, R: rural/ urban centre, H: historical/ religious centre
Owing to space constraints in the small map, the actual locations in a larger map may vary slightly

=== Location ===
Chhota Laukuthi is located at 26.331199°N 89.771893°E.

The 2011 census record does not identify Bakshirhat as a separate inhabited place but the place has a post office and a police station by that name. Census maps do not show Bakshirhat police station, but it is mentioned in Cooch Behar police records. Google maps show both Chhota Laukuthi and Bakshirhat as adjacent places.

=== Area overview ===
The map alongside shows the eastern part of the district. In Tufanganj subdivision 6.97% of the population lives in the urban area and 93.02% in rural areas. In Dinhata subdivision 5.98% of the population lives in the urban areas and 94.02% lives in the urban areas. The entire district forms the flat alluvial flood plains of mighty rivers.

Note: The map alongside presents some of the notable locations in the subdivisions. All places marked in the map are linked in the larger full screen map.

== Civic administration ==
=== CD block HQ ===
The headquarters of the Tufanganj II CD block are located at Chhota Laukuthi.

== Demographics ==
As per the 2011 Census of India, Chhota Laukuthi had a total population of 5,480. There were 2,791 (51%) males and 2,689 (49%) females. There were 622 persons in the age range of 0 to 6 years. The total number of literate people in Chhota Laukuthi was 3,986 (82.05% of the population over 6 years).

== Infrastructure ==
According to the District Census Handbook 2011, Koch Bihar, Chota Laukuthi covered an area of 0.6863 km^{2}. Among the civic amenities, it had 33 km roads with open drains, the protected water supply involved tank/pond/lake, hand pumps. It had 450 electric connections, 40 electric light points. Among the medical facilities the nearest dispensary/ health centre was 3 km away, it had 4 medicine shops in the town. Among the educational facilities it had 2 primary schools, 3 middle schools, 1 high school, 1 higher secondary school.
