= Chamta =

- Village
- Location in West Bengal, India Chamta (India)
- Coordinates: 26.3075°N 89.6539°E
- Country: India
- State: West Bengal
- District: Cooch Behar

Population (2011)
  - Total: 8,190
- Time zone: UTC+5:30 (IST)
- PIN: 736159
- Telephone/STD code: 03582
- Vehicle registration: WB
- Lok Sabha constituency: Alipurduars
- Vidhan Sabha constituency: Tufanganj
- Website: coochbehar.gov.in

Chamta is a village in the Tufanganj I CD block in the Tufanganj subdivision of the Cooch Behar district in West Bengal, India

== Geography ==
Places in the Tufanganj and Dinhata subdivisions (except Sitai CD block) in Cooch Behar district
CT: census town, M: municipal town, R: rural/ urban centre, H: historical/ religious centre
Owing to space constraints in the small map, the actual locations in a larger map may vary slightly

=== Location ===
Chamta is located at 26.3075°N 89.65399°E.

=== Area overview ===
The map alongside shows the eastern part of the district. In Tufanganj subdivision 6.97% of the population lives in the urban areas and 93.02% lives in the rural areas. In Dinhata subdivision 5.98% of the population lives in the urban areas and 94.02% lives in the urban areas. The entire district forms the flat alluvial flood plains of mighty rivers.

Note: The map alongside presents some of the notable locations in the subdivisions. All places marked in the map are linked in the larger full screen map.

== Demographics ==
As per the 2011 Census of India, Chamta had a total population of 8,190. There were 4,240 (52%) males and 3,950 (48%) females. There were 885 persons in the age range of 0 to 6 years. The total number of literate people in Chamta was 5,529 (75.69% of the population over 6 years).

== Culture ==
There is a small temple with char-chala tin roof, wherein a triangular stone covered with vermillion is worshipped as Devi Ghurneswari, a form of goddess Kali. A trishula representing Bhairava is also worshipped. The temple draws devotees in large numbers on festive occasions. According to local legend, a cow/ buffalo used to come regularly and offer milk to the stone-piece lying under a banyan tree. Information about the incident reached Maharaja Harendra Narayan (1780-1839) of Cooch Behar State. He had a temple built; however, the present one seems to be a later construction.
