= Mekliganj Assembly constituency =

Mekliganj (SC)
- Constituency No. 1 for the West Bengal Legislative Assembly
- Interactive Map Outlining Mekliganj Assembly Constituency

Constituency details
- Country: India
- Region: East India
- State: West Bengal
- District: Cooch Behar
- Lok Sabha constituency: Jalpaiguri (SC)
- Established: 1951
- Total electors: 224,781
- Reservation: SC

Member of Legislative Assembly
- 18th West Bengal Legislative Assembly
- Incumbent Dadhiram Ray
- Party: Bharatiya Janata Party
- Elected year: 2026

Most Successful parties from Mekliganj (SC) assembly
1. All India Forward Block (12 times) (66.7%)
2. Indian National Congress (3 times) (16.7%)
3. All India Trinamool Congress (2 times) (11.1%)
4. Bharatiya Janata Party (1 time) (5.55%)

Mekliganj (SC) Assembly constituency is an assembly constituency in Cooch Behar district in the Indian state of West Bengal. It is reserved for scheduled castes.

== Overview ==
As per orders of the Delimitation Commission, No. 1 Mekliganj Assembly constituency (SC) covers Mekliganj municipality, Mekliganj community development block, Haldibari municipality and Haldibari community development block.

Mekliganj Assembly constituency is part of No. 3 Jalpaiguri (Lok Sabha constituency) (SC).

== Members of the Legislative Assembly ==
| Year | Name | Party |
|---|---|---|
| 1951 | Prasanta Chatterjee | Indian National Congress |
| 1957 | Prasanta Chatterjee | Indian National Congress |
| 1962 | Amar Roy Pradhan | All India Forward Bloc |
| 1967 | Amar Roy Pradhan | All India Forward Bloc |
| 1969 | Amar Roy Pradhan | All India Forward Bloc |
| 1971 | Mihir Kumar Roy | All India Forward Bloc |
| 1972 | Madhu Sudan Roy | Indian National Congress |
| 1977 | Sada Kanta Roy | All India Forward Bloc |
| 1982 | Sada Kanta Roy | All India Forward Bloc |
| 1987 | Sada Kanta Roy | All India Forward Bloc |
| 1991 | Paresh Chandra Adhikary | All India Forward Bloc |
| 1996 | Ramesh Roy | All India Forward Bloc |
| 2001 | Paresh Chandra Adhikary | All India Forward Bloc |
| 2006 | Paresh Chandra Adhikary | All India Forward Bloc |
| 2011 | Paresh Chandra Adhikary | All India Forward Bloc |
| 2016 | Arghya Roy Pradhan | All India Trinamool Congress |
| 2021 | Paresh Chandra Adhikary | All India Trinamool Congress |
| 2026 | Dadhiram Ray | Bharatiya Janata Party |

== Election results ==
Vote share of Winning candidates
| 2026 | 54.42% |
| 2021 | 49.98% |
| 2016 | 41.35% |
| 2011 | 48.89% |
| 2006 | 46.80% |
| 2001 | 51.18% |
| 1996 | 32.42% |
| 1991 | 50.33% |
| 1987 | 52.18% |
| 1982 | 52.07% |
| 1977 | 45.30% |
| 1972 | 57.72% |
| 1971 | 43.89% |
| 1969 | 52.38% |
| 1967 | 64.01% |
| 1962 | 63.69% |
| 1957 | 43.46% |
| 1951 | 45.69% |

=== 2026 ===
2026 West Bengal Legislative Assembly election: Mekliganj
| Party | Candidate | Votes | % | ±% |
|---|---|---|---|---|
| BJP | Dadhiram Ray | 119,109 | 54.42 | |
| AITC | Adhikary Paresh Chandra | 89,525 | 40.91 | |
| AIFB | Kamal Kumar Roy | 2,386 | 1.09 | |
| NOTA | None of the above | 2,126 | 0.97 | |
| SUCI(C) | Hiten Barman | 1,392 | 0.64 | |
| INC | Ila Rani Roy | 1,288 | 0.59 | ▼26.15 |
| IND | 6 Independent Candidates | 3,033 | 1.39 | |
| Majority | | 29,584 | 13.51 | |
| Swing to BJP from AITC | | Swing | | |

=== 2021 ===
2021 West Bengal Legislative Assembly election: Mekliganj
| Party | Candidate | Votes | % | ±% |
|---|---|---|---|---|
| AITC | Paresh Chandra Adhikary | 99,338 | 49.98 | |
| BJP | Dadhiram Ray | 84,653 | 42.59 | |
| AIFB | Gobinda Chandra Roy | 6,853 | 3.45 | |
| NOTA | None of the Above | 2,447 | 1.23 | |
| IND | 2 Independent Candidates | 1,466 | 0.74 | |
| OTH | 4 Other Party Candidates | 3,987 | 2.01 | |
| Majority | | 14,685 | 7.39 | |
| Turnout | | 198,744 | 87.76 | |
| AITC hold | | Swing | | |

=== 2016 ===
2016 West Bengal Legislative Assembly election: Mekliganj
| Party | Candidate | Votes | % | ±% |
|---|---|---|---|---|
| AITC | Arghya Roy Pradhan | 74,823 | 41.35 | |
| AIFB | Paresh Chandra Adhikary | 68,186 | 37.68 | |
| BJP | Dadhiram Ray | 23,355 | 12.91 | |
| BSP | Jyotish Roy | 5,650 | 3.12 | |
| NOTA | None of the Above | 2,333 | 1.29 | |
| IND | 2 Independent Candidates | 1,869 | 1.03 | |
| OTH | 3 Other Party Candidates | 4,744 | 2.62 | |
| Majority | | 6,637 | 3.67 | |
| Turnout | | 180,960 | 89.28 | |
| Swing to AITC from AIFB | | Swing | | |

=== 2011 ===
2011 West Bengal Legislative Assembly election: Mekliganj (SC)
| Party | Candidate | Votes | % | ±% |
|---|---|---|---|---|
| AIFB | Adhikary Paresh Chandra | 72,040 | 48.89 | |
| INC | Jayanta Kumar Ray | 39,408 | 26.74 | |
| IND | Sunil Chandra Ray | 23,540 | 15.97 | |
| BJP | Subhash Barman | 3,713 | 2.52 | |
| BSP | Jyotish Roy | 3,359 | 2.28 | |
| SUCI(C) | Pramila Roy | 2,593 | 1.76 | |
| IND | Purnendu Roy | 1,474 | 1.00 | |
| AMB | Ratan Barman | 1,230 | 0.83 | |
| Majority | | 32,632 | 22.15 | |
| Turnout | | 147,357 | 86.59 | |
| AIFB hold | | Swing | | |

=== 2006 ===
2006 West Bengal Legislative Assembly election: Mekliganj (SC)
| Party | Candidate | Votes | % | ±% |
|---|---|---|---|---|
| AIFB | Paresh Chandra Adhikary | 67,491 | 46.80 | |
| AITC | Sunil Chandra Roy | 39,490 | 27.38 | |
| INC | Jayanta Kumar Roy | 23,092 | 16.01 | |
| IND | Pramila Roy (Barman) | 4,943 | 3.43 | |
| BSP | Jyotish Roy | 2,895 | 2.01 | |
| IND | Bijoy Kumar Roy | 2,807 | 1.95 | |
| IND | Ananta Kumar Barman | 2,110 | 1.46 | |
| AMB | Ratan Barman | 1,401 | 0.97 | |
| Majority | | 28,001 | 19.42 | |
| Turnout | | 144,229 | | |
| AIFB hold | | Swing | | |

=== 2001 ===
2001 West Bengal Legislative Assembly election: Mekliganj (SC)
| Party | Candidate | Votes | % | ±% |
|---|---|---|---|---|
| AIFB | Paresh Chandra Adhikary | 65,351 | 51.18 | |
| AITC | Ramesh Roy | 48,318 | 37.84 | |
| BJP | Prafulla Deb Adhikary | 6,436 | 5.04 | |
| IND | Jogesh Ch. Roy | 3,373 | 2.64 | |
| IND | Pramila Roy | 2,434 | 1.91 | |
| AMB | Nayan Chand Barman | 1,784 | 1.40 | |
| Majority | | 17,033 | 13.34 | |
| Turnout | | 127,708 | 85.51 | |
| AIFB hold | | Swing | | |

=== 1996 ===
1996 West Bengal Legislative Assembly election: Mekliganj (SC)
| Party | Candidate | Votes | % | ±% |
|---|---|---|---|---|
| AIFB | Ramesh Roy | 40,982 | 32.42 | |
| INC | Sunil Chandra Ray | 38,999 | 30.85 | |
| FB(S) | Adhikary Paresh | 27,644 | 21.87 | |
| BJP | Satish Chandra Ray | 12,109 | 9.58 | |
| BSP | Anil Roy | 2,508 | 1.98 | |
| AMB | Nayan Chand Barman | 2,332 | 1.84 | |
| IND | Abiram Roy | 1,839 | 1.45 | |
| Majority | | 1,983 | 1.57 | |
| Turnout | | 133,096 | 90.62 | |
| AIFB hold | | Swing | | |

=== 1991 ===
1991 West Bengal Legislative Assembly election: Mekliganj (SC)
| Party | Candidate | Votes | % | ±% |
|---|---|---|---|---|
| AIFB | Paresh Chandra Adhikary | 56,032 | 50.33 | |
| INC | Mani Bhusan Roy | 34,838 | 31.29 | |
| BJP | Girinath Roy | 14,084 | 12.65 | |
| BSP | Gopal Chandra Roy | 3,407 | 3.06 | |
| IND | Abiram Roy | 1,897 | 1.70 | |
| AMB | Nayan Chand Barman | 631 | 0.57 | |
| IND | Bhupendra Nath Roy Basunia | 444 | 0.40 | |
| Majority | | 21,194 | 19.04 | |
| Turnout | | 115,071 | 83.17 | |
| AIFB hold | | Swing | | |

=== 1987 ===
1987 West Bengal Legislative Assembly election: Mekliganj (SC)
| Party | Candidate | Votes | % | ±% |
|---|---|---|---|---|
| AIFB | Sada Kanta | 48,071 | 52.18 | |
| INC | Madhu Sudan Roy | 39,034 | 42.37 | |
| IND | Gopal Chandra Roy | 2,381 | 2.58 | |
| SUCI(C) | Abiram Roy | 1,683 | 1.83 | |
| BJP | Jadu Nath Sarkar | 961 | 1.04 | |
| Majority | | 9,037 | 9.81 | |
| Turnout | | 93,777 | 79.07 | |
| AIFB hold | | Swing | | |

=== 1982 ===
1982 West Bengal Legislative Assembly election: Mekliganj (SC)
| Party | Candidate | Votes | % | ±% |
|---|---|---|---|---|
| AIFB | Sada Kanta Roy | 40,958 | 52.07 | |
| IC(S) | Niren Chowdhury | 28,528 | 36.27 | |
| SUCI(C) | Arun Roy | 6,426 | 8.17 | |
| IND | Sibendra Nath Roy | 1,628 | 2.07 | |
| IND | Manindra Nath Roy | 1,114 | 1.42 | |
| Majority | | 12,430 | 15.80 | |
| Turnout | | 80,807 | 77.71 | |
| AIFB hold | | Swing | | |

=== 1977 ===
1977 West Bengal Legislative Assembly election: Mekliganj (SC)
| Party | Candidate | Votes | % | ±% |
|---|---|---|---|---|
| AIFB | Sada Kant Roy | 21,339 | 45.30 | |
| INC | Madhusudan Roy | 12,622 | 26.80 | |
| JP | Pranhari Singha Sarker | 8,901 | 18.90 | |
| IND | Subhash Chandra Maitra | 2,578 | 5.47 | |
| SUCI(C) | Kanailal Mallick | 1,661 | 3.53 | |
| Majority | | 8,717 | 18.50 | |
| Turnout | | 47,925 | 51.75 | |
| Swing to AIFB from INC | | Swing | | |

=== 1972 ===
1972 West Bengal Legislative Assembly election: Mekliganj (SC)
| Party | Candidate | Votes | % | ±% |
|---|---|---|---|---|
| INC | Madhusudan Roy | 25,816 | 57.72 | |
| AIFB | Amarendranath Roy Prodhan | 18,233 | 40.77 | |
| IND | Sudhangshu Kumar Sarkar | 675 | 1.51 | |
| Majority | | 7,583 | 16.95 | |
| Turnout | | 45,990 | 59.47 | |
| Swing to INC from AIFB | | Swing | | |

=== 1971 ===
1971 West Bengal Legislative Assembly election: Mekliganj (SC)
| Party | Candidate | Votes | % | ±% |
|---|---|---|---|---|
| AIFB | Mihir Kumar Ray | 19,880 | 43.89 | |
| INC | Mani Bhushan Roy | 15,982 | 35.29 | |
| CPI(M) | Kshir Prasad Barman | 3,996 | 8.82 | |
| INC(O) | Tara Prasanna Ray Basunta | 3,745 | 8.27 | |
| IND | Sudhangshu Kumar Roy Sarkar | 1,687 | 3.72 | |
| Majority | | 3,898 | 8.60 | |
| Turnout | | 47,666 | 62.44 | |
| AIFB hold | | Swing | | |

=== 1969 ===
1969 West Bengal Legislative Assembly election: Mekliganj
| Party | Candidate | Votes | % | ±% |
|---|---|---|---|---|
| AIFB | Amarendra Nath Roy Prouhan | 25,678 | 52.38 | |
| INC | Madhusudan Roy | 22,823 | 46.56 | |
| PBI | Sibendra Nath Roy | 522 | 1.06 | |
| Majority | | 2,855 | 5.82 | |
| Turnout | | 50,430 | 69.65 | |
| AIFB hold | | Swing | | |

=== 1967 ===
1967 West Bengal Legislative Assembly election: Mekliganj (SC)
| Party | Candidate | Votes | % | ±% |
|---|---|---|---|---|
| AIFB | A. N. R. Prodhan | 31,402 | 64.01 | |
| INC | M. Roy | 16,753 | 34.15 | |
| SWA | T. Roy Basunia | 905 | 1.84 | |
| Majority | | 14,649 | 29.86 | |
| Turnout | | 51,497 | 71.84 | |
| AIFB hold | | Swing | | |

=== 1962 ===
1962 West Bengal Legislative Assembly election: Makliganj
| Party | Candidate | Votes | % | ±% |
|---|---|---|---|---|
| AIFB | Amarendra Nath Roy Prohan | 17,592 | 63.69 | |
| INC | Satyendra Prasanna Chattopadhyay | 10,030 | 36.31 | |
| Majority | | 7,562 | 27.38 | |
| Turnout | | 29,021 | 49.64 | |
| Swing to AIFB from INC | | Swing | | |

=== 1957 ===
1957 West Bengal Legislative Assembly election: Mekliganj
| Party | Candidate | Votes | % | ±% |
|---|---|---|---|---|
| INC | Satyendra Prasanna Chatterjee | 9,493 | 43.46 | |
| FBM | Amarendra Nath Roy Prodhan | 7,003 | 32.06 | |
| IND | Mukunda Mohan Singha Sarkar | 3,344 | 15.31 | |
| IND | Monoranjan Guha Roy | 1,173 | 5.37 | |
| HM | Debabrata Singha | 831 | 3.80 | |
| Majority | | 2,490 | 11.40 | |
| Turnout | | 21,844 | 49.46 | |
| INC hold | | Swing | | |

=== 1951 ===
1951 West Bengal Legislative Assembly election: Mekliganj
| Party | Candidate | Votes | % | ±% |
|---|---|---|---|---|
| INC | Satyendra Prasanna Chatterjee | 7,748 | 45.69 | |
| IND | Mukunda Mohan Sarkar | 7,175 | 42.31 | |
| IND | Amal Kumar Sen | 2,036 | 12.01 | |
| Majority | | 573 | 3.38 | |
| Turnout | | 16,959 | 32.36 | |
| INC win (new seat) | | | | |
