= Maruganj =

Coordinates: 24°17′N 83°26′E

- village
- Interactive map of Maruganj
- Country: India
- State: West Bengal

Languages
  - Official: Bengali, English
- Time zone: UTC+5:30 (IST)

Maruganj is a village and grampanchyat of Tufanganj subdivision, Cooch Behar district in West Bengal, India, located on National Highway 31. This area is mostly known for its brick field lots of brick fields available here and so many people come here to work as a workers.

== Amenities ==
It has a higher secondary school and several primary schools. It is served by "Maradanga Railway Station". Maruganj also has a bank, as well as a crematorium which was renovated in 2024.
