= Tufanganj II =

Tufanganj-II
- Community development block
- Interactive map of Tufanganj-II
- Coordinates: 26.397399°N 89.811298°E
- Country: India
- State: West Bengal
- District: Cooch Behar

Government
  - Type: Representative democracy

Area
  - Total: 265.69 km^{2} (102.58 sq mi)

Population (2011)
  - Total: 186,726
  - Density: 702.80/km^{2} (1,820.2/sq mi)

Languages
  - Official: Rajbanshi(Bengali), Bengali, English
- Time zone: UTC+5:30 (IST)
- Lok Sabha constituency: Alipurduars
- Vidhan Sabha constituency: Tufanganj
- Website: coochbehar.gov.in

Tufanganj-II is a community development block (CD block) that forms an administrative division in Tufanganj subdivision of Cooch Behar district in the Indian state of West Bengal.

== Geography ==
Falimari, a constituent panchayat of the block, is located at 26.397399°N 89.811298°E.

Topographically Cooch Behar district is generally plain land which is low and marshy at some places. “Considering the nature of general surface configuration, relief and drainage pattern, distribution of different types of soil, climatic condition, the formation of geology and forest tracts, the district Koch Bihar falls under Barind Tract. The physiology of this area consists of alluvial soil, generally blackish brown in colour and composed of sand, clay and silt. The soils are loose and sandy throughout the district.” The Himalayan formations in the north end beyond the boundaries of this district. There are no hills/ mountains here. It has a large network of rivers flowing from north-west to south and south-east. The Teesta flows through Mekhliganj CD block before entering Bangladesh. The Jaldhaka and its connected river-streams form a large catchment area in the district. It virtually divides the district into two unequal parts and meets the Brahmaputra in Bangladesh. The Himalayan rivers flowing through Cooch Behar district change courses from time to time. In 1876, W.W. Hunter mentioned the Dharla and the Torsha as the same stream with two names. However, since the advent of the 20th century, these are two different streams meeting the Brahmaputra in Bangladesh.

The hill-streams of Cooch Behar carry debris and silt from the Himalayas and are shallow. During the monsoons the speed of flow of the rivers almost doubles and the rivers overflow the banks causing floods and devastation. The Raidak I and II, and Sankosh are the major rivers causing floods in the Tufanganj I and II CD blocks.

The Tufanganj II CD block is bounded by the Alipurduar II and Kumargram CD blocks in Alipurduar district on the north, the Gossaigaon Revenue Circle/ Tehsil in Kokrajhar district and Agamoni revenue circle/tehsil in Dhubri district of Assam on the east, the Tufanganj I CD block on the south and west.

The Tufanganj II CD block has an area of 265.69 km^{2}. It has 1 panchayat samity, 11 gram panchayats, 141 gram sansads (village councils), 54 mouzas, 53 inhabited villages and 1 census towns. Bakshirhat police station serves this block. Headquarters of this CD block is at Chhota Laukuthi.

There are 11 Gram Panchayats under Tufanganj-II Development Block/Panchayat Samity. Gram panchayats of Tufanganj II block/ Panchayat samity are: Barokodali I, Barokodali II, Bhanukumari I, Bhanukumar II, Falimari, Mahiskuchi I, Mahiskuchi II, Rampur I, Rampur II, Salbari I and Salbari II.

Community development blocks in Cooch Behar district

== Demographics ==
=== Population ===
According to the 2011 Census of India, the Tufanganj II CD block had a population of 186,726, of which 181,246 were rural and 5,480 were urban. There were 96,222 (52%) males and 90,504 (48%) females. There were 21,429 persons in the age range of 0 to 6 years. The Scheduled Castes numbered 100,378 (53.76%) and the Scheduled Tribes numbered 3,966 (2.12%).

According to the 2001 census, Tufanganj II block had a population of 167,428, out of which 85,249 were males and 82,179 were females. Tufanganj II block registered a population growth of 13.60 per cent during the 1991-2001 decade.

Census towns in the Tufanganj II CD block are (2011 census figures in brackets): Chhota Laukuthi (5,480).

Large villages (with 4,000+ population) in the Tufanganj II CD block are (2011 census figures in brackets): Rampur (18,270), Najiran Deutikhada (4,340), Jaldhoa (5,042), Singimari (4,459), Takoamari (4,346), Rasikbil (4,223), Bara Salbari (8,224), Salbari (9,415), Basraja Pratham Khanda (6,251), Mahiskuchi (7,192), Falimari (11,385), Bhanukumari (14,340), Dhldabri (4,582), Bhandijalas (5,002), Bara Kodali (5,009), Nakarkhana (4,169), Bala Kuthi (5,424), Mansai (6,046) and Debgram (4,242).

Other villages in the Tufanganj II CD block include (2011 census figures in brackets): Jhingapuni (3,277).

=== Literacy ===
According to the 2011 census, the total number of literate persons in the Tufanganj II CD block was 125,207 (75.75% of the population over 6 years) out of which males numbered 70,041 (82.12% of the male population over 6 years) and females numbered 55,166 (68.95% of the female population over 6 years). The gender disparity (the difference between female and male literacy rates) was 13.17%.

See also – List of West Bengal districts ranked by literacy rate

Literacy in CD blocks of
Cooch Behar district
Cooch Behar Sadar subdivision
Cooch Behar I – 76.56%
Cooch Behar II – 81.39%
Dinhata subdivision
Dinhata I – 73.23%
Dinhata II – 72.33%
Sitai – 62.79%
Mathabhanga subdivision
Sitalkuchi – 70.34%
Mathabhanga I – 71.51%
Mathabhanga II – 72.68%
Tufanganj subdivision
Tufanganj I – 73.69%
Tufanganj II – 75.75%
Mekhliganj subdivision
Mekhliganj – 69.34%
Haldibari – 69.22%
2011 Census: CD Block Wise

Primary Census Abstract Data

=== Language and religion ===
Religion in Tufanganj II CD block (2011)
Hinduism	85.60%
Islam	14.15%
Other or not stated	0.25%

In the 2011 Census of India, Hindus numbered 159,830 and formed 85.60% of the population of Tufanganj II CD block. Muslims numbered 26,416 and formed 14.15% of the population. Christians numbered 194 and formed 0.10% of the population. Others numbered 286 and formed 0.15% of the population.

Languages of Tufanganj II CD block (2011)
1. Bengali (92.3%)
2. 'Other' Bengali (4.91%)
3. Rajbongshi (1.24%)
4. Others (1.59%)

At the time of the 2011 census, 92.26% of the population spoke Bengali and 1.24% Rajbongshi as their first language. 4.91% were recorded as speaking 'Other' under Bengali.

== Rural poverty ==
Based on a study of the per capita consumption in rural and urban areas, using central sample data of NSS 55th Round 1999-2000, Cooch Behar district had a rural poverty ratio of 25.62%.

According to a World Bank report, as of 2012, 20-26% of the population of Cooch Behar, Birbhum, Nadia and Hooghly districts were below poverty line, marginally higher than the level of poverty in West Bengal, which had an average 20% of the population below poverty line.

== Economy ==
=== Livelihood ===
Livelihood
in Tufanganj II CD block
1. Cultivators (28.7%)
2. Agricultural labourers (33.8%)
3. Household industries (5.77%)
4. Other Workers (31.7%)

In the Tufanganj II CD block in 2011, among the class of total workers, cultivators numbered 21,309 and formed 28.70%, agricultural labourers numbered 25,114 and formed 33.82%, household industry workers numbered 4,582 and formed 5.77% and other workers numbered 23,550 and formed 31.72%. Total workers numbered 74,255 and formed 39.77% of the total population, and non-workers numbered 112,471 and formed 60.23% of the population.

Note: In the census records a person is considered a cultivator, if the person is engaged in cultivation/ supervision of land owned by self/government/institution. When a person who works on another person's land for wages in cash or kind or share, is regarded as an agricultural labourer. Household industry is defined as an industry conducted by one or more members of the family within the household or village, and one that does not qualify for registration as a factory under the Factories Act. Other workers are persons engaged in some economic activity other than cultivators, agricultural labourers and household workers. It includes factory, mining, plantation, transport and office workers, those engaged in business and commerce, teachers, entertainment artistes and so on.

=== Infrastructure ===
There are 53 inhabited villages in the Tufanganj II CD block, as per the District Census Handbook, Cooch Behar, 2011. 100% villages have power supply. 52 villages (98.11%) have drinking water supply. 21 villages (39.62%) have post offices. 50 villages (94.34%) have telephones (including landlines, public call offices and mobile phones). 30 villages (56.60%) have pucca (paved) approach roads and 26 villages (49.06%) have transport communication (includes bus service, rail facility and navigable waterways). 4 villages (7.55%) have agricultural credit societies and 7 villages (13.21%) have banks.

=== Agriculture ===
Agriculture is the primary mode of living in the district. The entire Cooch Behar district has fertile soil and around half of the cultivated land in the district is cropped twice or more. Paddy (rice) and jute are the largest producing crops, followed by potatoes, vegetables and pulses. There are 23 tea gardens on glided slopes. There are some coconut, areca nut and betel leaf plantations. 77.6% of the land holdings are marginal.

In 2012-13, there were 51 fertiliser depots, 1 seed store and 32 fair price shops in the Tufanganj II CD block.

In 2012–13, the Tufanganj II CD block produced 37,813 tonnes of Aman paddy, the main winter crop, from 16,422 hectares, 13,548 tonnes of Boro paddy (spring crop) from 4,069 hectares, 418 tonnes of Aus paddy (summer crop) from 272 hectares, 4,329 tonnes of wheat from 1,616 hectares, 34,588 tonnes of jute from 3,179 hectares and 23,813 tonnes of potatoes from 799 hectares. It also produced pulses and oilseeds.

In 2012-13, the total area irrigated in the Tufanganj II CD block was 4,305 hectares, out of which 50 hectares were irrigated by private canal water, 490 hectares by tank water, 358 hectares by river lift irrigation, 172 hectares by deep tube wells, 2,184 hectares by shallow tube wells, 501 hectares by open dug wells, 550 hectares by other means.

=== Pisciculture ===
Being a river-bound district, pisciculture is an important economic activity in the Cooch Behar district. Almost all the rivers originating in the Himalayas have a lot of fish. The net area under effective pisciculture in 2010-11 in the Tufanganj II CD block was 182.49 hectares. 12,375 persons were engaged in the profession and approximate annual production was 17,845 quintals.

=== Banking ===
In 2012-13, Tufanganj II CD block had offices of 2 commercial banks and 5 gramin banks.

== Transport ==
Tufanganj II CD block has 8 ferry services and 5 originating/ terminating bus routes.

The New Cooch Behar-Golokganj branch line passes through this block and there are stations at Tufanganj and Bakshirhat.

== Education ==
In 2012-13, Tufanganj II CD block had 143 primary schools with 13,101 students, 32 middle schools with 21,905 students, 6 high schools with 6,991 students and 10 higher secondary schools with 13,299 students. Tufanganj II CD block had 1 general degree college with 904 students and 381 institutions for special and non-formal education with 14,210 students.

See also – Education in India

According to the 2011 census, in the Tufanganj II CD block, among the 53 inhabited villages, 1 village did not have a school, 35 villages had two or more primary schools, 23 villages had at least 1 primary and 1 middle school and 12 villages had at least 1 middle and 1 secondary school.

Bakshirhat Mahavidyalaya was established in 2005 at Bakshirhat.

== Healthcare ==
In 2013, Tufanganj II CD block had 1 block primary health centre and 2 primary health centres with total 24 beds and 5 doctors (excluding private bodies). It had 32 family welfare subcentres. 8,469 patients were treated indoor and 37,192patients were treated outdoor in the hospitals, health centres and subcentres of the CD block.

Bakshirhat Block Primary Health Centre, with 10 beds at Bakshirhat, is the major government medical facility in the Tufanganj II CD block. There are primary health centres at Salbari (with 4 beds) and Rampur (with 10 beds).
