= Natabari, Cooch Behar =

Natabari
- Village
- Location in West Bengal, India Natabari (India)
- Coordinates: 26.4145°N 89.5947°E
- Country: India
- State: West Bengal
- District: Cooch Behar

Population (2011)
  - Total: 6,113
- Time zone: UTC+5:30 (IST)
- PIN: 736156
- Telephone/STD code: 03582
- Vehicle registration: WB
- Lok Sabha constituency: Cooch Behar
- Vidhan Sabha constituency: Natabari
- Website: coochbehar.gov.in

Natabari is a village and a gram panchayat in the Tufanganj I CD block in the Tufanganj subdivision of the Cooch Behar district in the state of West Bengal, India.

== Geography ==
Places in the Tufanganj and Dinhata subdivisions (except Sitai CD block) in Cooch Behar district
CT: census town, M: municipal town, R: rural/ urban centre, H: historical/ religious centre
Owing to space constraints in the small map, the actual locations in a larger map may vary slightly

=== Location ===
Natabari is located at 26.4145°N 89.5947°E.

Natabari I and Natabari II are gram panchayats in Tufanganj I CD block.

=== Area overview ===
The map alongside shows the eastern part of the district. In the Tufanganj subdivision 6.97% of the population lives in the urban areas and 93.02% lives in the rural areas. In the Dinhata subdivision 5.98% of the population lives in the urban areas and 94.02% lives in the urban areas. The entire district forms the flat alluvial flood plains of mighty rivers.

Note: The map alongside presents some of the notable locations in the subdivisions. All places marked on the map are linked in the larger full screen map.

== Demographics ==
As per the 2011 Census of India, Natabari had a total population of 6,113. There were 3,189 (52%) males and 2,924 (48%) females. There were 715 persons in the age range of 0 to 6 years. The total number of literate people in Natabari was 4,314 (79.92% of the population over 6 years).

== Healthcare ==
Natabari Rural Hospital, with 30 beds at Natabari, is the major government medical facility in the Tufanganj I CD block.
