= Dadhiram Ray =

Indian politician in West Bengal

Member of the West Bengal Legislative Assembly
- Incumbent
- Assumed office 4 May 2026
- Preceded by: Paresh Chandra Adhikary
- Constituency: Mekliganj

Personal details
- Party: Bharatiya Janata Party
- Spouse: Papri Acharya
- Children: Hardik Roy; Debparna Roy
- Parent: Dhiren Ray
- Occupation: Social Worker; Farmer
- Profession: Politician

Dadhiram Ray, (Bengali: দধিরাম রায়) is an Indian politician from Cooch Behar district of West Bengal. He is a member of West Bengal Legislative Assembly, from Mekliganj Assembly constituency. He is a member of Bharatiya Janata Party.

== Early life and education ==
Ray is from Cooch Behar district of West Bengal. His qualification is H.S Passed under West Bengal Council of Higher Secondary Education in the year 2003.

== Political career ==
He is a member of West Bengal Legislative Assembly, from Mekliganj Assembly constituency.

=== Electoral performance ===
West Bengal Legislative Assembly
Year	Constituency	Party	Votes	%	Opponent	Party	Votes	%	Margin	Result
2026	Mekliganj	BJP	1,19,109	54.42	Paresh Adhikary	AITC	89,525	40.91	29,584	Won

== See also ==
- 2026 West Bengal Legislative Assembly election
- List of chief ministers of West Bengal
- West Bengal Legislative Assembly
