= Paresh Chandra Adhikary =

Indian politician

Minister of State For School Education, Government of West Bengal
- In office 10 May 2021 – 3 August 2022
- Minister: Bratya Basu
- Governor: Jagdeep Dhankhar
- Chief Minister: Mamata Banerjee
- Department: School and Higher Education
- Succeeded by: Satyajit Barman

Member of the West Bengal Legislative Assembly
- In office 2 May 2021 – 4 May 2026
- Preceded by: Arghya Roy Pradhan
- Succeeded by: Dadhiram Ray
- Constituency: Mekliganj
- In office 1991–1996
- Preceded by: Sada Kanta Roy
- Succeeded by: Ramesh Roy
- In office 2001–2016
- Preceded by: Ramesh Roy
- Succeeded by: Arghya Roy Pradhan

Chairman of Rogi Kalyan Samiti, Mekhliganj Sub-divisional Hospital
- Incumbent
- Assumed office 5 August 2022

Personal details
- Party: Trinamool Congress (2018–present)
- Other political affiliations: All India Forward Bloc (till 2018)
- Education: Mekhliganj High School
- Profession: Politician

Paresh Chandra Adhikary is an Indian politician from West Bengal. He was a five-time member of the West Bengal Legislative Assembly from Mekliganj Assembly constituency. After serving for four terms representing the All India Forward Bloc, he was last elected representing the All India Trinamool Congress in May 2021.

== Early life ==
Adhikary hails from Mekliganj, Cooch Behar district. His father's name is Dutta Narayan Adhikary. He passed Higher Secondary Examination from Mekhliganj High School, West Bengal Board of Secondary Education in 1970.

== Career ==
Adhikary became MLA for the first time in 1991 after winning the Forward Bloc ticket. Although he lost the 1996 assembly elections, he continued to win for the Forward Bloc in 2001, 2006 and 2011. He was the Acting Food Minister of the Left Front Government in West Bengal from 2006 to 2011.

In August 2018, he left the Forward Bloc and joined the Trinamool Congress. In the 2019 Lok Sabha elections, he contested from Cooch Behar Lok Sabha on Trinamul Congress ticket. But Adhikary lost to BJP candidate Nisith Pramanik.

In the 2021 assembly elections, he won the Mekhliganj assembly seat again and became the MLA and Chief Minister Mamata Banerjee made him the state minister for Department of School Education in the State. In August 2022, he was dropped from her cabinet after the Court case regarding the appointment of the daughter of the minister as a teacher.

== Controversy ==
On 17 May 2022, Justice Abhijit Gangopadhyay of Calcutta High Court directed CBI to interrogate Adhikary for alleged appointment of his daughter Ankita Adhikary as a teacher in a government aided school. The court also urged Chief Minister and Governor Jagdeep Dhankhar to remove Adhikary from the post of Minister.
