= Malati Rava Roy =

Indian politician

- মালতী রাভা রায়

Minister of State(Independent Charge), Government of West Bengal
- Incumbent
- Assumed office 01 June 2026
- Governor: R. N. Ravi
- Chief Minister: Suvendu Adhikari
- Departments: Minister of Women, Child Development and Social Welfare; Department of Self Help Group & Self Employment

Member of the West Bengal Legislative Assembly
- Incumbent
- Assumed office 4 May 2021
- Preceded by: Fazal Karim Miah
- Constituency: Tufanganj

Personal details
- Party: Bharatiya Janata Party
- Spouse: Indra Mohan Rava
- Children: Anirban Jyoti Rava
- Education: North Bengal University
- Occupation: Social Work; Farming
- Profession: Politician

Malati Rava Roy (Bengali: মালতী রাভা রায়) is an Indian politician from West Bengal. She is a member of West Bengal Legislative Assembly, from Tufanganj Assembly constituency. She is a member of the Bharatiya Janata Party.

== Early life and education ==
Roy is from Kotwali, Cooch Behar district of West Bengal. She has done Bachelor of Arts from Alipurduar College under the North Bengal University in the year 1986.

== Political career ==
She is a member of the West Bengal Legislative Assembly. On 1 June 2026, she took oath as a Minister of State (Independent Charge), along with two other members.

=== Electoral performance ===
West Bengal Legislative Assembly
Year	Constituency	Party	Votes	%	Opponent	Party	Votes	%	Margin	Result
2021	Tufanganj	BJP	1,14,503	54.69	Pranab Kumar Dey	AITC	83,305	39.79	31,198	Won
2026	Tufanganj	BJP	1,22,525	53.08	Shibsankar Paul	AITC	96,068	41.62	26,457	Won

== See also ==
- 2026 West Bengal Legislative Assembly election
- List of chief ministers of West Bengal
- West Bengal Legislative Assembly
- 18th West Bengal Assembly
