= Tufanganj I =

- Community development block
- Interactive map of Tufanganj I
- Coordinates: 26.415833°N 89.595833°E
- Country: India
- State: West Bengal
- District: Cooch Behar

Government
  - Type: Representative democracy

Area
  - Total: 317.00 km^{2} (122.39 sq mi)

Population (2011)
  - Total: 248,595
  - Density: 784.21/km^{2} (2,031.1/sq mi)

Languages
  - Official: Bengali, English
- Time zone: UTC+5:30 (IST)
- Lok Sabha constituency: Alipurduars, Cooch behar
- Vidhan Sabha constituency: Tufanganj, Natabari
- Website: coochbehar.gov.in

Tufanganj I is a community development block (CD block) that forms an administrative division in the Tufanganj subdivision of the Cooch Behar district in the Indian state of West Bengal.

== Geography ==
Natabari, a constituent panchayat of the block, is located at 26°24′57″N 89°35′45″E.

Topographically Cooch Behar district is generally plain land which is low and marshy at some places. “Considering the nature of general surface configuration, relief and drainage pattern, distribution of different types of soil, climatic condition, the formation of geology and forest tracts, the district Koch Bihar falls under Barind Tract. The physiology of this area consists of alluvial soil, generally blackish brown in colour and composed of sand, clay and silt. The soils are loose and sandy throughout the district.” The Himalayan formations in the north end beyond the boundaries of this district. There are no hills/ mountains here. It has a large network of rivers flowing from north-west to south and south-east. The Teesta flows through Mekhliganj CD block before entering Bangladesh. The Jaldhaka and its connected river-streams form a large catchment area in the district. It virtually divides the district into two unequal parts and meets the Brahmaputra in Bangladesh. The Himalayan rivers flowing through Cooch Behar district change courses from time to time. In 1876, W.W. Hunter mentioned the Dharla and the Torsha as the same stream with two names. However, since the advent of the 20th century, these are two different streams meeting the Brahmaputra in Bangladesh.

The hill-streams of Cooch Behar carry debris and silt from the Himalayas and are shallow. During the monsoons the speed of flow of the rivers almost doubles and the rivers overflow the banks causing floods and devastation. The Raidak I and II, and Sankosh are the major rivers causing floods in the Tufanganj I and II CD blocks.

The Tufanganj I CD block is bounded by the Alipurduar II CD block in Alipurduar district on the north, the Tufanganj II CD block and Agamoni revenue circle/tehsil in Dhubri district of Assam on the east, the Dinhata II CD block and Bhurungamari Upazila in Kurigram District of Bangladesh on the south, the Cooch Behar I and Cooch Behar II CD blocks on the west.

The Tufanganj I CD block has an area of 317.00 km^{2}. It has 1 panchayat samity, 14 gram panchayats, 192 gram sansads (village councils), 73 mouzas, 72 inhabited villages and 1 census towns. Tufangnj police station serves this block. Headquarters of this CD block is at Tufanganj.

Gram panchayats of Tufanganj I block/ panchayat samiti are: Andaran Fulbari I, Andaran Fulbari II, Balabhut, Balarampur I, Balarampur II, Chilakhana I, Chilakhana II, Deocharai, Dhalpal I, Dhalpal II, Maruganj, Nakkatigachh, Natabari I and Natabari II.

Community development blocks in Cooch Behar district

== Demographics ==
=== Population ===
According to the 2011 Census of India, the Tufanganj I CD block had a total population of 248,595, of which 243,256 were rural and 5,339 were urban. There were 128,415 (52%) males and 120,180 (48%) females. There were 29,090 persons in the age range of 0 to 6 years. The Scheduled Castes numbered 115,000 (46.26%) and the Scheduled Tribes numbered 378 (0.15%).

According to the 2001 census, Tufanganj I block had a total population of 222,993, out of which 113,825 were males and 109,164 were females. Tufanganj I block registered a population growth of 16.47 per cent during the 1991-2001 decade.

Census towns in the Tufanganj I CD block are (2011 census figures in brackets): Kamat Phulbari (P) (5,339).

Large villages (with 4,000+ population) in the Tufanganj I CD block are (2011 census figures in brackets): Natabari (6,113), Chhat Rampur Dwitiya Khanda (5,773), Dhalpal (7,319), Charaljani (6,534), Airani Chitalia (5,036), Jaigir Chilakhaa (8,712), Andaran Phulbari (P), Ghogarkuthi Pratham Khanda (10,826), Chilakhana (9,263), Maradanga (8,775), Balarampur (34,113), Deocharai (7,849), Chamta (8,190), Dwiparpar (5,256), Nakkatigachhi (4,243), Jhaljhali (4,072), Krishnapur (5,740), Balabhut (10,008) and Jhaukuthi (4,273).

Other villages in the Tufanganj I CD block include (2011 census figures in brackets): Dhadial (3,870) and Bhuchungmari (1,541).

=== Literacy ===
According to the 2011 census, the number of literate persons in the Tufanganj I CD block was 161,744 (73.69% of the population over 6 years) out of which males numbered 90,476 (79.78% of the male population over 6 years) and females numbered 71,268 (67.17% of the female population over 6 years). The gender disparity (the difference between female and male literacy rates) was 12.61%.

See also – List of West Bengal districts ranked by literacy rate

Literacy in CD blocks of
Cooch Behar district
Cooch Behar Sadar subdivision
Cooch Behar I – 76.56%
Cooch Behar II – 81.39%
Dinhata subdivision
Dinhata I – 73.23%
Dinhata II – 72.33%
Sitai – 62.79%
Mathabhanga subdivision
Sitalkuchi – 70.34%
Mathabhanga I – 71.51%
Mathabhanga II – 72.68%
Tufanganj subdivision
Tufanganj I – 73.69%
Tufanganj II – 75.75%
Mekhliganj subdivision
Mekhliganj – 69.34%
Haldibari – 69.22%
2011 Census: CD Block Wise

Primary Census Abstract Data

=== Language and religion ===
Religion in Tufanganj I CD block (2011)
Hinduism	69.85%
Islam	29.79%
Other or not stated	0.36%

In the 2011 Census of India, Hindus numbered 173,652 and formed 69.85% of the population of Tufanganj I CD block. Muslims numbered 74,065 and formed 29.79% of the population. Christians numbered 577 and formed 0.23% of the population. Others numbered 301 and formed 0.12% of the population.

Languages of Tufanganj I CD block (2011)
1. Bengali (95.5%)
2. 'Other' Bengali (2.39%)
3. Rajbongshi (1.73%)
4. Others (0.40%)

At the time of the 2011 census, 95.48% of the population spoke Bengali and 1.73% Rajbongshi as their first language. 2.39% were recorded as speaking 'Other' under Bengali.

== Rural poverty ==
Based on a study of the per capita consumption in rural and urban areas, using central sample data of NSS 55th Round 1999-2000, Cooch Behar district had a rural poverty ratio of 25.62%.

According to a World Bank report, as of 2012, 20-26% of the population of Cooch Behar, Birbhum, Nadia and Hooghly districts were below poverty line, marginally higher than the level of poverty in West Bengal, which had an average 20% of the population below poverty line.

== Economy ==
=== Livelihood ===
Livelihood
in Tufanganj I CD block
1. Cultivators (24.7%)
2. Agricultural labourers (35.0%)
3. Household industries (9.94%)
4. Other Workers (30.4%)

In the Tufanganj I CD block in 2011, among the class of total workers, cultivators numbered 24,856 and formed 24.69%, agricultural labourers numbered 35,176 and formed 34.95%, household industry workers numbered 10,007 and formed 9.94% and other workers numbered 30,618 and formed 30.42%. Total workers numbered 100,657 and formed 40.49% of the total population, and non-workers numbered 147,938 and formed 59.51% of the population.

Note: In the census records a person is considered a cultivator, if the person is engaged in cultivation/ supervision of land owned by self/government/institution. When a person who works on another person's land for wages in cash or kind or share, is regarded as an agricultural labourer. Household industry is defined as an industry conducted by one or more members of the family within the household or village, and one that does not qualify for registration as a factory under the Factories Act. Other workers are persons engaged in some economic activity other than cultivators, agricultural labourers and household workers. It includes factory, mining, plantation, transport and office workers, those engaged in business and commerce, teachers, entertainment artistes and so on.

=== Infrastructure ===
There are 72 inhabited villages in the Tufanganj I CD block, as per the District Census Handbook, Cooch Behar, 2011. All of the villages have power supply and drinking water supply. 31 villages (43.06%) have post offices. 48 villages (66.67%) have telephones (including landlines, public call offices and mobile phones). 33 villages (45.83%) have pucca (paved) approach roads and 24 villages (33.33%) have transport communication (includes bus service, rail facility and navigable waterways). 9 villages (12.50%) have agricultural credit societies and 7 villages (9.72%) have banks.

=== Agriculture ===
Agriculture is the primary mode of living in the district. The entire Cooch Behar district has fertile soil and around half of the cultivated land in the district is cropped twice or more. Paddy (rice) and jute are the largest producing crops, followed by potatoes, vegetables and pulses. There are 23 tea gardens on glided slopes. There are some coconut, areca nut and betel leaf plantations. 77.6% of the land holdings are marginal.

In 2012-13, there were 89 fertiliser depots, 1 seed store and 49 fair price shops in the Tufanganj I CD block.

In 2012–13, the Tufanganj I CD block produced 41,806 tonnes of Aman paddy, the main winter crop, from 18,986 hectares, 15,895 tonnes of Boro paddy (spring crop) from 5,412 hectares, 1,880 tonnes of Aus paddy (summer crop) from 1,122 hectares, 7,344 tonnes of wheat from 2,876 hectares, 1,617 tonnes of maize from 664 hectares, 83,866 tonnes of jute from 7,787 hectares, 68,042 tonnes of potatoes from 1,799 hectares and 77,903 tonnes of sugar cane from 745 hectares. It also produced pulses and oilseeds.

In 2012-13, the total area irrigated in the Tufanganj I CD block was 5,545 hectares, out of which 90 hectares were irrigated by private canal water, 1,565 hectares by tank water, 689 hectares by river lift irrigation, 200 hectares by deep tube wells, 2,160 hectares by shallow tube wells, 91 hectares by open dug wells, 750 hectares by other means.

=== Pisciculture ===
Being a river-bound district, pisciculture is an important economic activity in the Cooch Behar district. Almost all the rivers originating in the Himalayas have a lot of fish. The net area under effective pisciculture in 2010-11 in the Tufanganj I CD block was 297.06 hectares. 12,250 persons were engaged in the profession and approximate annual production was 19,904 quintals.

=== Banking ===
In 2012-13, Tufanganj I CD block had offices of 7 commercial banks and 6 gramin banks.

== Transport ==
Tufanganj I CD block has 24 ferry services and 8 originating/ terminating bus routes.

The New Cooch Behar-Golokganj branch line passes through this block and there are stations at Tufanganj and Bakshirhat.

== Education ==
In 2012-13, Tufanganj I CD block had 153 primary schools with 15,782 students, 27 middle schools with 18,005 students, 9 high schools with 9,576 students and 14 higher secondary schools with 18,266 students. Tufanganj I CD block had 524 institutions for special and non-formal education with 20,223 students. Tufanganj municipal area had 1 general degree college with 1,967 students and 3 technical/ professional institutions with 275 students (outside the CD block).

See also – Education in India

According to the 2011 census, in the Tufanganj I CD block, among the 72 inhabited villages, 4 villages did not have schools, 40 villages had two or more primary schools, 25 villages had at least 1 primary and 1 middle school and 16 villages had at least 1 middle and 1 secondary school.

== Healthcare ==
In 2013, Tufanganj I CD block had 1 block primary health centre and 3 primary health centres with total 58 beds and 6 doctors (excluding private bodies). It had 41 family welfare subcentres. 8,542 patients were treated indoor and 51,169 patients were treated outdoor in the hospitals, health centres and subcentres of the CD block.

Natabari Rural Hospital, with 30 beds at Natabari, is the major government medical facility in the Tufanganj I CD block. There are primary health centres at Dewchari (with 10 beds), Moradanga (with 10 beds and Balarampur (with 4 beds).
