= Fazal Karim Miah =

Indian politician

Member of the West Bengal Legislative Assembly
- In office 2016–2021
- Preceded by: Arghya Roy Pradhan
- Succeeded by: Malati Rava Roy
- Constituency: Tufanganj

Personal details
- Born: August 2, 1951 (age 74) Cooch Behar district, West Bengal
- Party: All India Trinamool Congress
- Occupation: Politician

Fazal Karim Miah is an Indian politician from the state of West Bengal. He was formerly a member of the West Bengal Legislative Assembly.

== Early life and background ==
Miah was born on 2 August 1951 to Piaruddin Miah and his wife, who belonged to a Bengali Sunni Muslim family. He completed his education at the Dhalpai Junior High School in Cooch Behar.

== Political career ==
Miah worked at a government-funded school before entering politics at an old age. Miah competed and won in the 2016 West Bengal elections where he represented the All India Trinamool Congress in the Tufanganj constituency.
