= Boxirhat railway station =

Railway station in West Bengal, India

Boxirhat Railway Station

General information
- Location: Bala Kuthi mouza (JL No - 104), Tufanganj II Block, PS - Boxirhat, Dist - Coochbehar State: West Bengal; India
- Coordinates: 26.328199°N 89.758893°E
- Elevation: 38 metres (125 ft)
- System: Indian Railways station
- Line: New Cooch Behar-Golokganj branch line
- Platforms: 1
- Tracks: 2

Construction
- Structure type: At grade
- Parking: yes

Other information
- Station code: BXHT
- Zone(s): North East Frontier Railway
- Division(s): Alipurduar

History
- Former names: Eastern Bengal Railway
Location
- Location within West Bengal Location within India

Boxirhat railway station serves the areas of Bakshirhat lying in Cooch Behar district in the Indian state of West Bengal. The station lies in New Cooch Behar-Golokganj branch line under Alipurduar railway division of Northeast Frontier Railway zone.
