= Tufanganj =

- Subdivisional Town
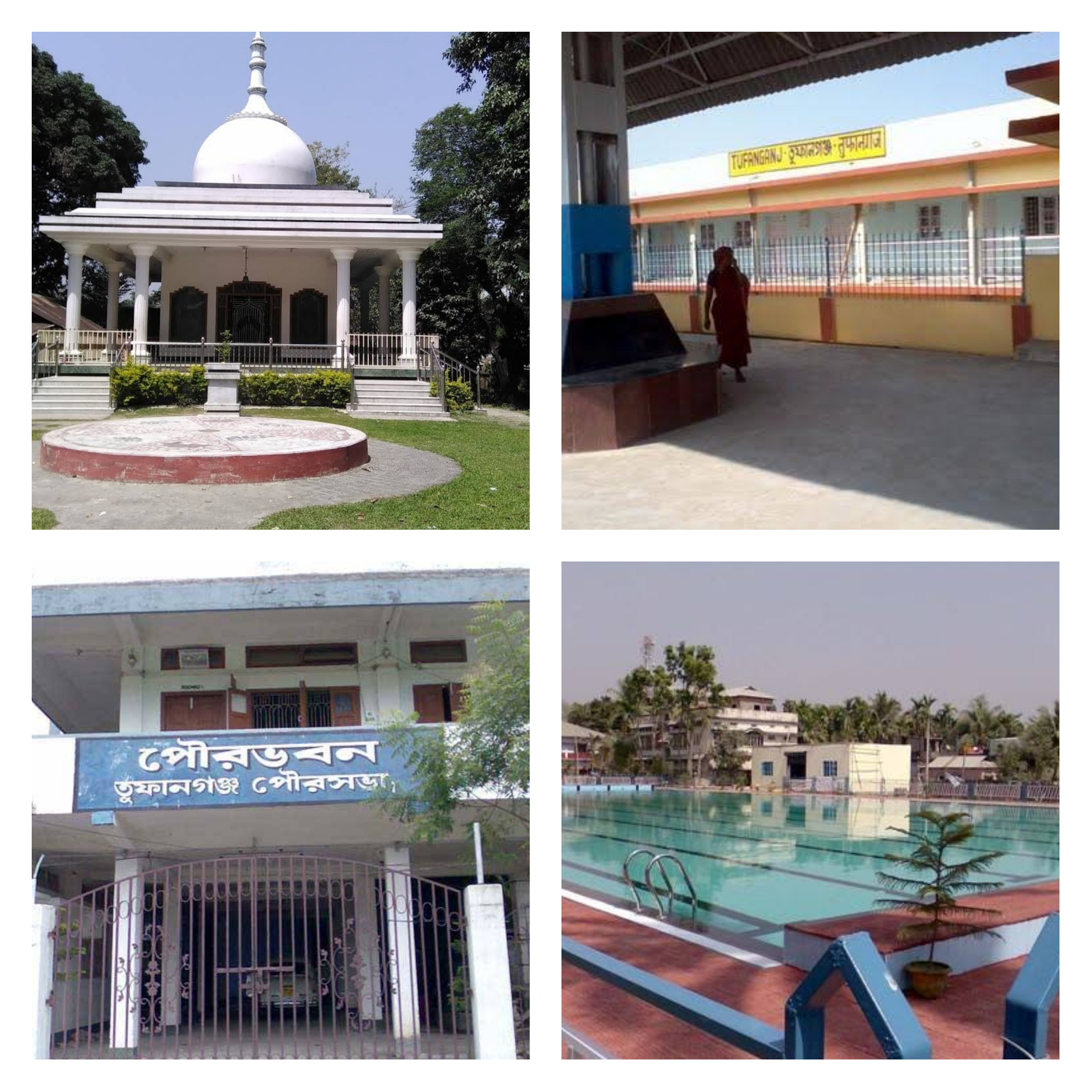
- Tufanganj Town

- Location in West Bengal, India Tufanganj (India) Tufanganj (Asia)
- Coordinates: 26.3345°N 89.6699°E
- Country: India
- State: West Bengal
- District: Cooch Behar
- Established: 1890

Government
  - Type: Municipality
  - Body: Tufanganj Municipality

Area
  - Total: 2.49 km^{2} (0.96 sq mi)
- Elevation: 70 m (230 ft)

Population (2011)
  - Total: 20,998
  - Density: 8,430/km^{2} (21,800/sq mi)

Languages
  - Official: Bengali
  - Additional official: English
- Time zone: UTC+5:30 (IST)
- Postal code: 736159/736160
- Vehicle registration: WB 63/64
- Lok Sabha constituency: Alipurduars (SC)
- Vidhan Sabha constituency: Tufanganj
- Website: coochbehar.nic.in

Tufanganj (Bengali pronunciation: [tufanɡɔnd͡ʒ]), is a town and a municipality of Cooch Behar district in the Indian state of West Bengal. It is the headquarters of the Tufanganj subdivision.

== Civic administration ==
=== Police station ===
Tufanganj police station has jurisdiction over Tufanganj municipal area and Tufanganj I CD block.

=== CD block HQ ===
The headquarters of the Tufanganj I CD block are located at Tufanganj town.

== Culture ==
Tufanganj is rich in Bengali culture. There is an old Community Hall where various cultural programs happens throughout the year. It is one of the centers for Bhawaiya song and dance. Durga Puja is celebrated in a grand way here. Tufanganj Devibari Durga Puja is the oldest Durga Puja in Tufanganj. Tufanganj Madan Mohan Bari Temple is famous for devotees.

=== Dol Mela ===
Tufanganj has a long-standing tradition of organizing the Dol Mela during Dol Purnima, celebrated in the March-April season. This fair lasts for 14-15 days. Madan Mohan/Lord Krishna worshiped during these days.

== Demographics ==
As per 2011 Census of India Tufanganj had a total population of 20,998 of which 10,684 (51%) were males and 10,314 (49%) were females. Population in the age range 0–6 years was 1,619. The total number of literate persons in Tufanganj was 17,727 (91.48% of the population over 6 years).

As of 2001 India census, Tufanganj had a population of 19,293. Males constitute 51% of the population and females 49%. Tufanganj has an average literacy rate of 82%, higher than the national average of 59.5%: male literacy is 86%, and female literacy is 77%. In Tufanganj, 9% of the population is under 6 years of age.

== Education ==
=== Colleges ===
Tufanganj Mahavidyalaya was established in 1971. Affiliated with the Cooch Behar Panchanan Barma University, it offers honours courses in Bengali, English, Sanskrit, philosophy, History, geography, Political science,, Economics, Botany, Zoology, Chemistry and general courses in arts, science and commerce.

Tufanganj Government Polytechnic is a Diploma in Engineering Institute, which was established in 2014. Affiliated to WBSCTE.Civil, Mechanical and Survey are the main domains. It is located in Chamta, Tufanganj.

For learning technical working skills and experience, Tufanganj Government ITI here.

=== Schools ===
==== CBSE ====
- JAWAHAR NAVODAYA VIDYALAYA

==== CISCE ====
- Sister Nivedita Convent School

=== WBBSE ===
- Nripendra Narayan Memorial High School / Tufanganj NNM High School
- Tufanganj Andaranfulbari Harirdham High School
- Tufanganj Angadevi Girls' High School
- Tufanganj Iladevi Girls' High School
- Tufanganj Newtown Netaji Vidyalaya (H.S)
- Tufanganj Vivekananda Vidyalaya

== Geography ==
Places in the Tufanganj and Dinhata subdivisions (except Sitai CD block) in Cooch Behar district
CT: census town, M: municipal town, R: rural/ urban centre, H: historical/ religious centre
Owing to space constraints in the small map, the actual locations in a larger map may vary slightly

The river Raidak flows beside the town to the east.

According to the District Census Handbook 2011, Koch Bihar, Tufanganj covered an area of 2.49 km^{2}.

=== Area overview ===
The map alongside shows the eastern part of the district. In Tufanganj subdivision, 6.97% of the population lives in the urban areas and 93.02% in rural areas. In Dinhata subdivision 5.98% of the population lives in the urban areas and 94.02% lives in the urban areas. The entire district forms the flat alluvial flood plains of mighty rivers.

Note: The map alongside presents some of the notable locations in the subdivisions. All places marked in the map are linked in the larger full screen map.

=== Municipal Area ===
Tufanganj Municipality was established in 1983 and is located near the Assam border, making it a vital administrative and cultural hub in the Cooch Behar District of West Bengal. Comprising 12 wards, the municipality is known for fostering a good lifestyle and well-being for its residents. With a strong focus on culture and community, it provides efficient services that contribute to the overall development of the area. The municipality's dedication to maintaining infrastructure, sanitation, and public amenities ensures a high standard of living for its people.

== Healthcare ==
Tufanganj Subdivisional Hospital functions with 100 beds and Tufanganj Mental Hospital has 30 beds. Tufanganj Mental Hospital is one of the biggest and finest mental hospital in North Bengal. Tufanganj has also a veterinary hospital.

== Sports ==
Outdoor competitions are organized by the Tufanganj Municipality. The town has one outdoor stadium that is maintained by Sub-divisional Sports Association and one national level swimming pool.

== Transport ==
Tufanganj has two bus stands. The New Tufanganj Bus Stand, located near Kalibari, is the primary transportation hub, offering services from NBSTC (North Bengal State Transport Corporation) to various destinations in Cooch Behar district and Siliguri. The Old Tufanganj Bus Stand, though less modern, still serves local commuters with basic facilities and provides connections to nearby towns and some long-distance routes like Siliguri. Both bus stands ensure vital connectivity for the town and surrounding areas.

Tufanganj Railway Station is located in the Cooch Behar district of West Bengal, India, on the New Cooch Behar - Golakganj section. It is a small railway station that serves as an important connectivity point for the local population, connecting Tufanganj with major towns and cities in the region. The station falls under the jurisdiction of the Northeast Frontier Railway Zone (NFR). It is primarily used by passengers traveling along this route, with regular services catering to both short-distance and long-distance travel. The station is equipped with basic facilities, including platforms, waiting areas, and ticketing services. Tufanganj plays a vital role in facilitating transportation in the region, especially for those heading towards New Cooch Behar or crossing into neighboring Assam.

Tufanganj is well-connected to several airports in the region. The nearest is Cooch Behar Airport, about 30 km away, offering limited domestic flights to Kolkata. Additionally, Rupsi Airport in Assam, approximately 50 km away, provides domestic flights, primarily connecting to Guwahati/Kolkata. These airports provide essential air travel options for Tufanganj and the surrounding areas.

== Notable people ==
- Abbasuddin Ahmed (Bhawaiya Singer)
- Ananta Saha (Cricketer)
- Shib Sankar Paul (Cricketer)
