= Tufanganj subdivision =

- Subdivision
- Interactive map of Tufanganj subdivision
- Coordinates: 26.32°N 89.67°E
- Country: India
- State: West Bengal
- District: Cooch Behar
- Headquarters: Tufanganj

Languages
  - Official: Bengali, English
- Time zone: UTC+5:30 (IST)
- ISO 3166 code: ISO 3166-2:IN
- Vehicle registration: WB
- Website: wb.gov.in

Tufanganj subdivision is a subdivision of the Cooch Behar district in the state of West Bengal, India.

== Subdivisions ==
Cooch Behar district is divided into the following administrative subdivisions:

Subdivision	Headquarters	Area km^{2}	Population (2011)	Rural Population % (2011)	Urban Population % (2011)
Mekhliganj	Mekhliganj	459.78	282,750	90.09	9.91
Mathabhanga	Mathabhanga	896.26	654,831	96.35	3.65
Cooch Behar Sadar	Cooch Behar	754.84	748,394	77.92	22.08
Tufanganj	Tufanganj	586.44	456,319	93.02	6.97
Dinhata	Dinhata	692.02	676,792	94.02	5.98
Cooch Behar district	Cooch Behar	3,387.00	2,819,026	89.73	10.27

Places in the Tufanganj and Dinhata subdivisions (except Sitai CD block) in Cooch Behar district
CT: census town, M: municipal town, R: rural/ urban centre, H: historical/ religious centre
Owing to space constraints in the small map, the actual locations in a larger map may vary slightly

=== Administrative units ===
Tufanganj subdivision has 2 police stations, 2 community development blocks, 2 panchayat samitis, 25 gram panchayats, 127 mouzas, 125 inhabited villages, 1 municipality and 2 census towns. The municipality is: Tufanganj. The census towns are: Kamat Phulbari (P) and Chhota Laukuthi. The subdivision has its headquarters at Tufanganj.

== Police stations ==
Police stations in the Tufanganj subdivision have the following features and jurisdiction:

Police Station	Area covered km^{2}	International border	Inter-state border km	Municipal Town	CD block
Tufanganj	320.75	n/a	n/a	Tufanganj	Tufanganj I
Bakshirhat	257.22	n/a	-	-	Tufanganj II

=== Blocks ===
Community development blocks in the Tufanganj subdivision are:

CD block	Headquarters	Area km^{2}	Population (2011)	SC %	ST %	Literacy rate %	Census Towns
Tufanganj I	Tufanganj	317.00	248,595	46.26	0.15	73.69	1
Tufanganj II	Chhota Laukuthi	265.69	186,726	53.76	2.12	75.75	1

== Gram Panchayats ==
The subdivision contains 25 gram panchayats under 2 community development blocks:

- Tufanganj I block consists of 14 gram panchayats, viz. Andaran–Fulbari–I, Balabhut, Dhalpal–I, Natabari–I, Andaran–Fulbari–II, Chilkhana–I, Dhalpal–II, Natabari–II, Balarampur–I, Chilkhana–II, Maruganj, Balarampur–II, Deocharai and Nakkatigachh.
- Tufanganj II block consists of 11 gram panchayats, viz. Barokodali–I, Bhanukumari–II, Mahiskuchi–II, Salbari–I, Barokodali–II, Falimari, Rampur–I, Salbari–II, Bhanukumari–I, Mahiskuchi–I and Rampur–II.

== Education ==
Given in the table below is a comprehensive picture of the education scenario in Cooch Behar district, with data for the year 2012-13.

Subdivision	Primary School		Middle School		High School		Higher Secondary School		General College, Univ		Technical / Professional Instt		Non-formal Education	
Subdivision	Institution	Student	Institution	Student	Institution	Student	Institution	Student	Institution	Student	Institution	Student	Institution	Student
Mekhliganj	216	24,210	52	27,782	4	4,012	21	27,680	2	2858	1	55	456	25,387
Mathabhanga	432	52,235	80	52,338	14	113,452	42	61,315	4	3,910	8	578	1,171	70,179
Cooch Behar Sadar	441	61,375	47	15,322	33	35,204	56	59,614	6	8,934	29	3,749	1,195	61,733
Tufanganj	310	31,205	72	45,231	46	17,510	30	38,274	2	2,871	3	275	950	36,293
Dinhata	431	42,213	46	14,723	27	31,836	29	44,946	1	3,492	4	381	1,228	1,950
Cooch Behar district	1,830	211,247	297	154,943	94	102,014	178	231,829	15	22,065	45	5,038	5,000	223,323

Note: Primary schools include junior basic schools; middle schools, high schools and higher secondary schools include madrasahs; technical schools include junior technical schools, junior government polytechnics, industrial technical institutes, industrial training centres, nursing training institutes etc.; technical and professional colleges include engineering colleges, medical colleges, para-medical institutes, management colleges, teachers training and nursing training colleges, law colleges, art colleges, music colleges etc. Special and non-formal education centres include sishu siksha kendras, madhyamik siksha kendras, centres of Rabindra mukta vidyalaya, recognised Sanskrit tols, institutions for the blind and other handicapped persons, Anganwadi centres, reformatory schools etc.

=== Educational institutions ===
The following institutions are located in Tufanganj subdivision:

- Tufanganj Mahavidyalaya was established in 1971 at Tufanganj.
- Bakshirhat Mahavidyalaya was established in 2005 at Bakshirhat.

== Healthcare ==
The table below (all data in numbers) presents an overview of the medical facilities available and patients treated in the hospitals, health centres and sub-centres in 2013 in Cooch Behar district, with data for the year 2012-13.:

Subdivision	Health & Family Welfare Deptt, WB				Other State Govt Deptts	Local bodies	Central Govt Deptts / PSUs	NGO / Private Nursing Homes	Total	Total Number of Beds	Total Number of Doctors*	Indoor Patients	Outdoor Patients
Subdivision	Hospitals	Rural Hospitals	Block Primary Health Centres	Primary Health Centres	Other State Govt Deptts	Local bodies	Central Govt Deptts / PSUs	NGO / Private Nursing Homes	Total	Total Number of Beds	Total Number of Doctors*	Indoor Patients	Outdoor Patients
Mekhliganj	1	1	1	5	-	-	-	1	9	255	32	23,850	185,720
Mathabhanga	1	-	2	7	-	-	-	3	13	297	45	44,730	712,513
Cooch Behar Sadar	4	-	2	7	1	-	2	9	25	1,030	115	96,233	560,813
Tufanganj	1	-	2	5	1	-	-	3	12	266	38	46,232	560,813
Dinhata	1	-	3	7	-	-	-	3	14	429	50	62,943	624,514
Cooch Behar district	8	1	10	31	2	-	2	19	73	2,277	280	273,988	3,145,902

.* Excluding nursing homes.

=== Medical facilities ===
Medical facilities in the Tufanganj subdivision are as follows:

Hospitals: (Name, location, beds)

- Tufanganj Subdivisional Hospital, Tufanganj M, 100 beds
- Tufanganj Mental Hospital, Tufanganj

Rural Hospitals: (Name, CD block, location, beds)

- Natabari Rural Hospital, Tufanganj I CD block, Natabari, 30 beds

Block Primary Health Centres: (Name, CD block, location, beds)

- Bakshirhat Block Primary Health Centre, Tufanganj II CD block, Bakshirhat, 10 beds

Primary Health Centres : (CD block-wise)(CD block, PHC location, beds)

- Tufanganj I CD block: Dewchari (10), Moradanga (10), Balarampur (4)
- Tufanganj II CD block: Salbari (4), Rampur (10)

== Legislative segments ==
As per order of the Delimitation Commission in respect of the delimitation of constituencies in the West Bengal, the Tufanganj municipality, Tufanganj–II block and Andaran–Fulbari–I, Balabhut, Dhalpal–I and Nakkatigachh gram panchayats of Tufanganj–I block together will constitute the Tufanganj assembly constituency of West Bengal. The other ten gram panchayats of Tufanganj–I block, viz. Natabari–I, Andaran–Fulbari–II, Chilkhana–I, Dhalpal–II, Natabari–II, Balarampur–I, Chilkhana–II, Maruganj, Balarampur–II and Deocharai will be part of the Natabari assembly constituency. Natabari constituency will be part of Cooch Behar (Lok Sabha constituency), which will be reserved for Scheduled castes (SC) candidates. Tufanganj constituency will be part of Alipurduars (Lok Sabha constituency), which will be reserved for Scheduled tribes (ST) candidates.
