= Tufanganj Assembly constituency =

Tufanganj
- Constituency No. 9 for the West Bengal Legislative Assembly
- Interactive Map Outlining Tufanganj Assembly Constituency

Constituency details
- Country: India
- Region: East India
- State: West Bengal
- District: Cooch Behar
- Lok Sabha constituency: Alipurduars (ST)
- Established: 1951
- Total electors: 238,111
- Reservation: None

Member of Legislative Assembly
- 18th West Bengal Legislative Assembly
- Incumbent Malati Rava Roy
- Party: Bharatiya Janata Party
- Elected year: 2026

Most Successful parties from Tufanganj assembly
1. Communist Party of India (Marxist) (7 times) (38.9%)
2. Indian National Congress (6 times) (33.3%)
3. All India Trinamool Congress (2 times) (11.1%)
4. Bharatiya Janata Party (2 times) (11.1%)
5. Communist Party of India (1 time) (5.55%)

Tufanganj Assembly constituency is an assembly constituency in Cooch Behar district in the Indian state of West Bengal.

== Overview ==
As per orders of the Delimitation Commission, No. 9 Tufanganj Assembly constituency covers Tufanganj municipality, Tufanganj II community development block, and Andaran Fulbari I, Balabhut, Dhalpal I, Nakkatigachh gram panchayats of Tufanganj I community development block.

Tufanganj Assembly constituency is part of No. 2 Alipurduars (Lok Sabha constituency) (ST).

== Members of the Legislative Assembly ==
Year	Name	Party
1952	Jatindra Nath Singha Sarkar	Indian National Congress
1957	Jatindra Nath Singha Sarkar	Indian National Congress
1962	Jiban Krishna Dey	Communist Party of India
1967	Sankar Sen Ishore	Indian National Congress
1969	Akshay Kumar Barma	Indian National Congress
1971	Sisir Isore	Indian National Congress
1972	Sisir Isore	Indian National Congress
1977	Manindra Nath Barma	Communist Party of India (Marxist)
1982	Manindra Nath Barma	Communist Party of India (Marxist)
1987	Manindra Nath Barma	Communist Party of India (Marxist)
1991	Debendranath Barman	Communist Party of India (Marxist)
1996	Puspa Chandra Das	Communist Party of India (Marxist)
2001	Puspa Chandra Das	Communist Party of India (Marxist)
2006	Alaka Barman	Communist Party of India (Marxist)
2011	Arghya Roy Pradhan	All India Trinamool Congress
2016	Fazal Karim Miah	All India Trinamool Congress
2021	Malati Rava Roy	Bharatiya Janata Party
2026	Malati Rava Roy	Bharatiya Janata Party

== Election results ==
=== 2026 ===
In the 2026 West Bengal Legislative Assembly election, Malati Rava Roy of BJP defeated her nearest rival Shibsankar Paul of TMC by 26,457 votes.

2026 West Bengal Legislative Assembly election: Tufanganj
Party	Candidate	Votes	%	±%
BJP	Malati Rava Roy	122,525	53.08	▼1.61
AITC	Shibsankar Paul	96,068	41.62	▲1.83
CPI(M)	Dhananjoy Rava	4,863	2.11	New entry
INC	Debendranath Barma	1,658	0.72	▼2.13
IND	Bibhas Dakua	974	0.42	New entry
AJUP	Kabir Hossain	970	0.42	New entry
IND	Prafulla Prodhan	822	0.36	New entry
IND	Pramath Sarkar	631	0.27	New entry
KPP(U)	Maheswar Gayen	497	0.22	New entry
SUCI(C)	Bhola Saha	400	0.17	▼0.06
NOTA	Nota	1,421	0.62	▼0.37
Majority		26,457	11.46	▼3.44
Turnout		230,829	96.94	▲7.58
Registered electors		238,111		▲1.62
BJP hold		Swing	1.72	

=== 2021 ===
In the 2021 West Bengal Legislative Assembly election, Malati Rava Roy of BJP defeated her nearest rival Pranab Kumar Dey of TMC.

2021 West Bengal Legislative Assembly election: Tufanganj
Party	Candidate	Votes	%	±%
BJP	Malati Rava Roy	114,503	54.69	
AITC	Pranab Kumar Dey	83,305	39.79	
INC	Rabin Roy	5,973	2.85	
NOTA	None of the above	2,069	0.99	
Majority		31,198	14.9	
Turnout		209,378	89.36	
BJP gain from AITC		Swing		

=== 2016 ===
In the 2016 West Bengal Legislative Assembly election, Fazal Karim Miah of TMC defeated his nearest rival Shyamal Chowdhury of Congress.

2016 West Bengal Legislative Assembly election: Tufanganj constituency
Party	Candidate	Votes	%	±%
AITC	Fazal Karim Miah	85,052	44.21	Winner
INC	Shyamal Chowdhury	69,782	36.27	
BJP	Bivas Sen Ishore	30,048	15.62	
Independent	Manoj Kumar Mandal	1,958	1.02	
KPP	Nubash Barman	1,744	0.91	
SUCI(C)	Santana Datta	1,320	0.69	
None of the Above	None of the Above	2,498	1.30	
Majority		15,270	7.94	
Turnout		1,92,402	90.09	
AITC hold		Swing		

=== 2011 ===
In the 2011 West Bengal Legislative Assembly election, Arghya Roy Pradhan of TMC defeated his nearest rival Dhananjoy Rava of CPI(M).

2011 West Bengal Legislative Assembly election: Tufanganj constituency
Party	Candidate	Votes	%	±%
AITC	Arghya Roy Pradhan	73,721	45.02	Winner
CPI(M)	Dhanonjoy Rava	67,539	41.24	
BJP	Bimal Kumar Sarkar	17,220	10.52	
Independent	Shiben Barman	2,817	1.72	
Independent	Ganesh Dakua	2,463	1.50	
Majority		6,182	3.78	
Turnout		1,63,760	89.37	
AITC gain from CPI(M)		Swing		

=== 2006 ===
In the 2006 state assembly elections, Alaka Barman of CPI(M) won the 9 Tufanganj (SC) Assembly seat defeating her nearest rival Malati Rava (Ray) of BJP. Contests in most years were multi cornered but only winners and runners are being mentioned. Puspa Chandra Das of CPI(M) defeated Sachindra Chandra Das representing Trinamool Congress in 2001 and representing Congress in 1996. Debendranath Barman of CPI(M) defeated Mahesh Chandra Barman of Congress in 1991. Manindranath Barma of CPI(M) defeated Sisir Isore of Congress in 1987, Sankar Sen Ishore of Congress in 1982 and Surendra Narayan Roy Kungar of Congress in 1977.

=== 1972 ===
During 1967 to 1972 Tufanganj was a reserved seat for SC. Sisir Isore of Congress won in 1972 and 1971. Akshay Kumar Barma of Congress won in 1969. I.S.Sen of Congress won in 1967. In 1962 and 1957, it was an open seat. Jiban Krishna Dey of CPI won in 1962. Jatindra Nath Sinha Sarker of Congress won in 1957.
