= 2019 Indian general election in West Bengal =

Indian political election in West Bengal

- 11 April 2019 to 19 May 2019

All 42 West Bengal seats in the Lok Sabha
- Opinion polls
- Turnout: 81.76% (▼0.46 pp)
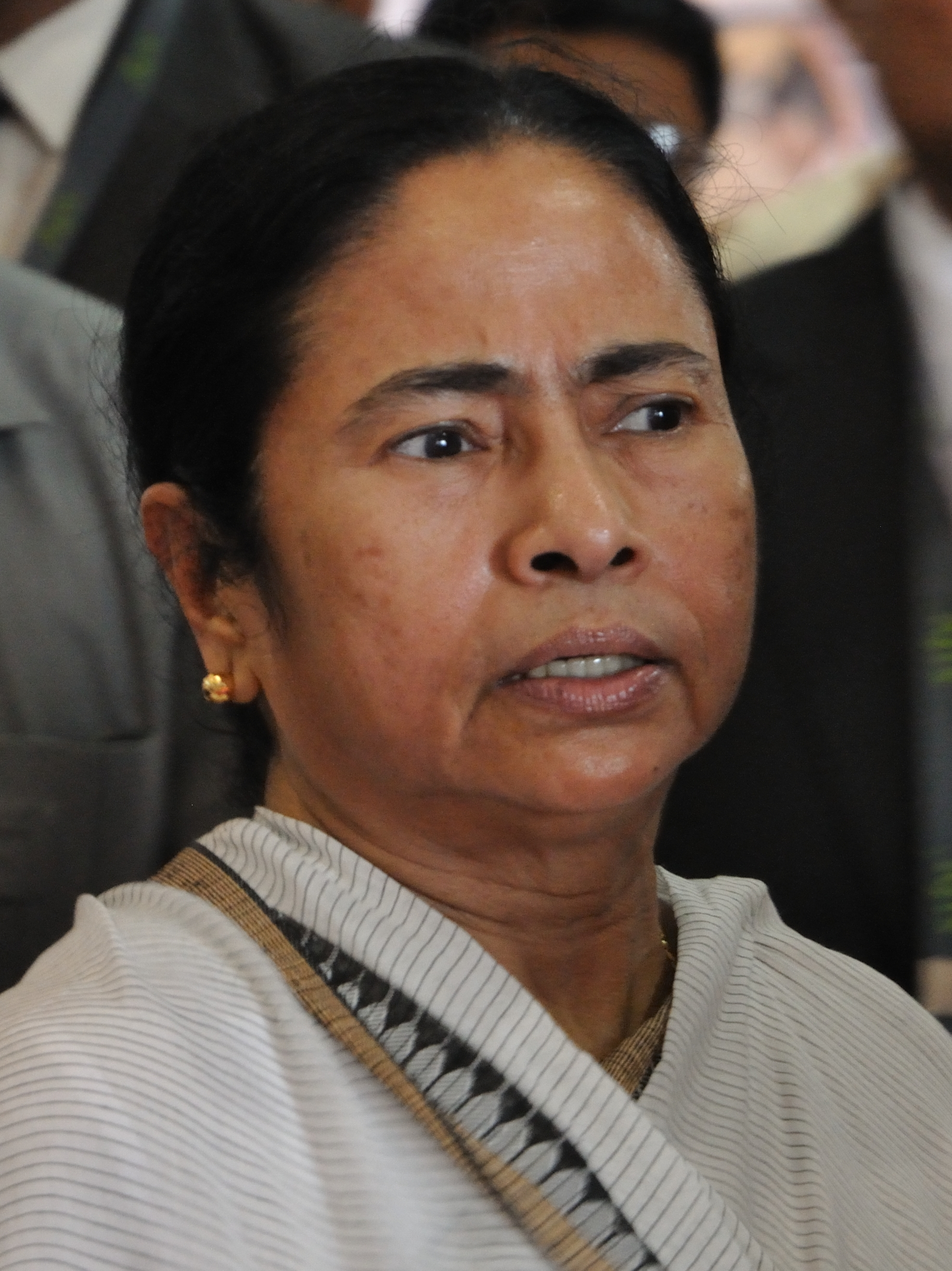

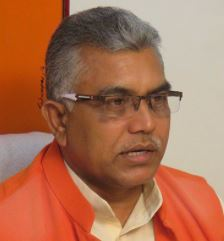

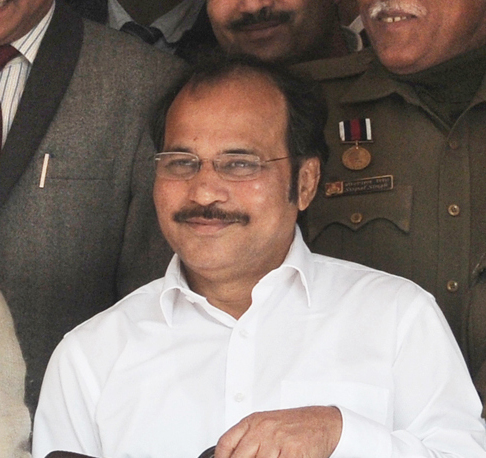
	First party	Second party	Third party
Leader	Mamata Banerjee	Dilip Ghosh	Adhir Ranjan Chowdhury
Party	AITC	BJP	INC
Alliance		NDA	UPA
Leader since	1998	2014	2015
Leader's seat	Did not contest	Medinipur (won)	Baharampur (won)
Last election	39.8%, 34 seats	17%, 2 seats	9.7%, 4 seats
Seats won	22	18	2
Seat change	▼12	▲16	▼2
Popular vote	24,757,345	23,028,517	3,210,491
Percentage	43.69%	40.64%	5.67%
Swing	▲3.48 pp	▲22.76 pp	▼4.03 pp
- West Bengal

Prime Minister before election
Narendra Modi
BJP
Prime Minister after election
Narendra Modi
BJP

The 2019 Indian general election were held in India between April and May 2019 to constitute the 17th Lok Sabha.

== Parties and alliances ==
Party/Alliance Name		Flag	Electoral symbol	Leader	Seats contested
All India Trinamool Congress				Mamata Banerjee	42
Bharatiya Janata Party				Dilip Ghosh	42
Indian National Congress				Adhir Ranjan Chaudhary	40
LF	Communist Party of India (Marxist)			Biman Bose	31
LF	Revolutionary Socialist Party			Manoj Bhattacharya	4
LF	All India Forward Bloc			Debabrata Biswas	3
LF	Communist Party of India			Swapan Banerjee	3
Socialist Unity Centre of India (Communist)				Provash Ghosh	42

== Surveys and polls ==
=== Vote share ===
Date published	Polling agency					Lead
Date published	Polling agency	AITC	Left Front	UPA	NDA	Lead
Jan 2019	Republic TV - C Voter	43.7%	14.4%	9.6%	31.8%	11.9%

=== Seat projections ===
Poll Type	Date published	Polling agency					Lead
Poll Type	Date published	Polling agency	AITC	UPA	Left Front	NDA	Lead
Exit poll		ABP - Nielson	24	2	0	16	8
Exit poll		Times Now - VMR	28	2	1	11	17
Exit poll		Republic TV- Jan Ki Baat	29	2	0	11	18
Exit poll		India Today - AxisMyIndia	19–22	0–1	0	19-23	1
Exit poll		NewsX - CNX	26	2	0	14	8
Exit poll		News24 - Today's Chanakya	23	1	0	18	5
Opinion poll	06 Apr 2019	India TV - CNX	28	1	1	12	16
Opinion poll	05 Apr 2019	Republic TV - Jan ki Baat	25	3	1	13	12
Opinion poll	Mar 2019	ABP News- Nielsen	31	3	–	8	23
Opinion poll	Jan 2019	Spick Media	30	4	0	8	22
Opinion poll	Jan 2019	Republic TV - C Voter	34	1	0	7	27
Opinion poll	Nov 2018	Spick Media	32	4	1	5	27
Opinion poll	Nov 2018	ABP News - C Voter	32	1	–	9	23

== Candidates ==
=== Trinamool Congress ===
On 12 March 2019, party president Mamata Banerjee announced the party candidates for the election. 41% of the candidates were women. Notable exclusions from the list were the party's general secretary Subrata Bakshi and Sugata Bose. Bose did not get permission from Harvard University, where he is a professor, to contest the election. Notable inclusions were Bengali actresses Mimi Chakraborty and Nusrat Jahan.

=== List of candidates ===
Constituency		AITC		BJP		INC		Left Front	
#	Name	Party	Candidate	Party	Candidate	Party	Candidate	Party	Candidate
1	Cooch Behar (SC)	AITC	Paresh Adhikary	BJP	Nisith Pramanik	INC	Priya Roy Choudhury	AIFB	Gobinda Chandra Roy
2	Alipurduars (ST)	AITC	Dasrath Tirkey	BJP	John Barla	INC	Mohan Lal Basumuta	RSP	Mili Oraon
3	Jalpaiguri (SC)	AITC	Bijoy Chandra Barman	BJP	Jayanta Ray	INC	Mani Kumar Darnal	CPM	Bhagirath Chandra Roy
4	Darjeeling	AITC	Amar Singh Rai	BJP	Raju Singh Bisht	INC	Shankar Malakar	CPM	Saman Pathak
5	Raiganj	AITC	Kanaia Lal Agarwal	BJP	Deboshree Chaudhary	INC	Deepa Dasmunshi	CPM	Mohammed Salim
6	Balurghat	AITC	Arpita Ghosh	BJP	Sukanta Majumdar	INC	Sadik Sarkar	RSP	Ranen Barman
7	Maldaha Uttar	AITC	Mausam Noor	BJP	Khagen Murmu	INC	Isha Khan Choudhury	CPM	Biswanath Ghosh
8	Maldaha Dakshin	AITC	Moazzem Hossain	BJP	Sreerupa Chaudhury	INC	Abu Hasem Khan Ch.		
9	Jangipur	AITC	Khalilur Rehman	BJP	Mafuja Khatun	INC	Abhijit Mukherjee	CPM	Md. Zulfikar Ali
10	Baharampur	AITC	Apurba Sarkar	BJP	Krishna Juardar Arya	INC	Adhir Ranjan Ch.	RSP	Id Mohammad
11	Murshidabad	AITC	Abu Taher Khan	BJP	Humayun Kabir	INC	Abu Hena	CPM	Badaruddoza Khan
12	Krishnanagar	AITC	Mahua Moitra	BJP	Kalyan Chaubey	INC	Intaj Ali Shah	CPM	Shantanu Jha
13	Ranaghat (SC)	AITC	Rupaali Biswas	BJP	Jagannath Sarkar	INC	Minati Biswas	CPM	C. A. Rama Biswas
14	Bangaon (SC)	AITC	Mamata Bala Thakur	BJP	Shantanu Thakur	INC	Sourav Prasad	CPM	Alokesh Das
15	Barrackpur	AITC	Dinesh Trivedi	BJP	Arjun Singh	INC	Mohammad Alam	CPM	Gargi Chatterjee
16	Dum Dum	AITC	Sougata Roy	BJP	Samik Bhattacharya	INC	Saurav Saha	CPM	Nepaldev Bhattacharya
17	Barasat	AITC	Kakoli Ghosh Dastidar	BJP	Mrinal Kanthi Debnath	INC	Subrota (Rashu) Dutta	AIFB	Haripada Biswas
18	Basirhat	AITC	Nusrat Jahan	BJP	Sayantan Basu	INC	Quazi Abdur Rahim	CPI	Pallab Sengupta
19	Jaynagar (SC)	AITC	Pratima Mondal	BJP	Ashok Kandari	INC	Tapan Mondal	RSP	Subhas Naskar
20	Mathurapur (SC)	AITC	Ch. Mohan Jatua	BJP	Shyamaprasad Halder	INC	Krittibas Sardar	CPM	Sarat Chandra Haldar
21	Diamond Harbour	AITC	Abhishek Banerjee	BJP	Nilanjan Roy	INC	Soumya Aich Roy	CPM	Fuad Halim
22	Jadavpur	AITC	Mimi Chakraborty	BJP	Anupam Hazra			CPM	Bikash Bhattacharya
23	Kolkata Dakshin	AITC	Mala Roy	BJP	Chandra Kumar Bose	INC	Mita Chakraborty	CPM	Nandini Mukherjee
24	Kolkata Uttar	AITC	Sudip Bandyopadhyay	BJP	Rahul Sinha	INC	Syed Shahid Imam	CPM	Kaninika Bose (Ghosh)
25	Howrah	AITC	Prasun Banerjee	BJP	Rantideb Sen Gupta	INC	Suvra Ghosh	CPM	Sumitro Adhikary
26	Uluberia	AITC	Sajda Ahmed	BJP	Joy Banerjee	INC	Shoma Ranisree Roy	CPM	Maksuda Khatun
27	Sreerampur	AITC	Kalyan Banerjee	BJP	Debajit Sarkar	INC	Debabrata Biswas	CPM	C. A. Tirthankar Ray
28	Hooghly	AITC	Ratna De (Nag)	BJP	Locket Chatterjee	INC	Pratul Saha	CPM	Pradip Saha
29	Arambagh (SC)	AITC	Aparupa Poddar	BJP	Tapan Roy	INC	Jyoti Das	CPM	Sakti Mohan Malik
30	Tamluk	AITC	Dibyendu Adhikari	BJP	Siddhartha Naskar	INC	Lakshman Seth	CPM	Sk. Ibrahim Ali
31	Contai	AITC	Sisir Adhikari	BJP	Debasish Samant	INC	Dipak Kumar Das	CPM	Paritosh Pattanayak
32	Ghatal	AITC	Dev	BJP	Bharati Ghosh	INC	Khandakar Md. Saifullah	CPI	Tapan Ganguli
33	Jhargram (ST)	AITC	Birbaha Soren	BJP	Kunar Hembram	INC	Jagyeswar Hembram	CPM	Deblina Hembram
34	Medinipur	AITC	Manas Bhunia	BJP	Dilip Ghosh	INC	Sambhunath Chatterjee	CPI	Biplab Bhatta
35	Purulia	AITC	Mriganko Mahato	BJP	Jyotirmay Mahato	INC	Nepal Mahato	AIFB	Bir Singh Mahato
36	Bankura	AITC	Subrata Mukherjee	BJP	Subhas Sarkar			CPM	Dr. Amiya Patra
37	Bishnupur (SC)	AITC	Shyamal Santra	BJP	Saumitra Khan	INC	Narayan Chandra Khan	CPM	Sunil Khan
38	Bardhaman Purba (SC)	AITC	Sunil Kumar Mandal	BJP	Paresh Chandra Das	INC	Siddhartha Majumdar	CPM	Iswar Chandra Das
39	Bardhaman-Durgapur	AITC	Mamtaz Sanghamita	BJP	S. S. Ahluwalia	INC	Ranajit Mukherjee	CPM	Abhas Ray Chaudhuri
40	Asansol	AITC	Moon Moon Sen	BJP	Babul Supriyo	INC	Biswarup Mondal	CPM	Gouranga Chatterjee
41	Bolpur (SC)	AITC	Asit Kumar Mal	BJP	Ram Prashad Das	INC	Abhijit Saha	CPM	Ram Chandra Dome
42	Birbhum	AITC	Satabdi Roy	BJP	Dudh Kumar Mondal	INC	Imam Hossain	CPM	Md. Rezaul Karim

== Results ==
=== Results by alliance or party ===
22	18	2
AITC	BJP	INC

Vote Share (By alliance)
1. AITC (43.3%)
2. BJP (40.2%)
3. LF (7.44%)
4. INC (5.61%)
5. Others (2.50%)

Party Name		Popular vote			Seats		
Party Name		Votes	%	±pp	Contested	Won	+/−
AITC		24,757,345	43.28	▲3.93	42	22	▼12
BJP		23,028,517	40.25	▲23.41	42	18	▲16
INC		3,210,491	5.61	▼3.97	40	2	▼2
LF							
LF	CPI(M)	3,594,283	6.28	▼16.43	31	0	▼2
LF	AIFB	239,312	0.42	▼1.72	3	0	Steady
LF	CPI	227,695	0.40	▼1.93	3	0	Steady
LF	RSP	208,275	0.36	▼2.07	4	0	Steady
LF	Total	4,269,565	7.46	▼22.15	41	0	▼2
Others		836,107	1.46	Steady	184	0	Steady
IND		541,801	0.95		112	0	Steady
NOTA		546,788	0.96	Steady			
Total		57,206,976	100%	-	461	42	-

=== Constituency-wise Results ===
Constituency		Winner				Runner Up				Margin	%
#	Name	Candidate	Party	Votes	%	Candidate	Party	Votes	%	Margin	%
1	Cooch Behar	Nisith Pramanik	BJP	731,594	47.96	Paresh Adhikary	AITC	677,363	44.40	54,231	3.56
2	Alipurduars	John Barla	BJP	750,804	54.36	Dasrath Tirkey	AITC	506,815	36.69	243,989	17.67
3	Jalpaiguri	Jayanta Kumar Roy	BJP	760,145	50.63	Bijoy Chandra Barman	AITC	576,141	38.37	184,004	12.26
4	Darjeeling	Raju Bista	BJP	750,067	59.08	Amar Singh Rai	AITC	336,624	26.51	413,443	32.57
5	Raiganj	Debasree Chaudhuri	BJP	511,652	40.03	Kanaia Lal Agarwal	AITC	451,078	35.29	60,574	4.74
6	Balurghat	Sukanta Majumdar	BJP	539,317	45.01	Arpita Ghosh	AITC	506,024	42.23	33,293	2.78
7	Maldaha Uttar	Khagen Murmu	BJP	509,524	37.59	Mausam Noor	AITC	425,236	31.37	84,288	6.22
8	Maldaha Dakshin	Abu Hasem Khan Ch.	INC	444,270	34.71	Sreerupa Chaudhury	BJP	436,048	34.07	8,222	0.64
9	Jangipur	Khalilur Rahaman	AITC	562,838	43.14	Mafuja Khatun	BJP	317,056	24.30	245,782	18.84
10	Baharampur	Adhir Ranjan Ch.	INC	591,106	45.43	Apurba Sarkar	AITC	510,410	39.23	80,696	6.20
11	Murshidabad	Abu Taher Khan	AITC	604,346	41.56	Abu Hena	INC	377,929	25.99	226,417	15.57
12	Krishnanagar	Mahua Moitra	AITC	614,872	44.99	Kalyan Chaubey	BJP	551,654	40.37	63,218	4.62
13	Ranaghat	Jagannath Sarkar	BJP	783,253	52.75	Rupali Biswas	AITC	549,825	37.03	233,428	15.72
14	Bangaon	Shantanu Thakur	BJP	687,622	48.81	Mamata Thakur	AITC	576,028	40.89	111,594	7.92
15	Barrackpore	Arjun Singh	BJP	472,994	42.82	Dinesh Trivedi	AITC	458,137	41.47	14,857	1.35
16	Dum Dum	Saugata Roy	AITC	512,062	42.51	Samik Bhattacharya	BJP	459,060	38.11	53,002	4.40
17	Barasat	Kakoli Dastidar	AITC	648,444	46.44	Mrinal Kanti Debnath	BJP	538,275	38.55	110,169	7.89
18	Basirhat	Nusrat Jahan	AITC	782,078	54.55	Sayantan Basu	BJP	431,709	30.11	350,369	24.44
19	Jaynagar	Pratima Mondal	AITC	761,202	56.12	Ashok Kandary	BJP	444,427	32.77	316,775	23.35
20	Mathurapur	Ch. Mohan Jatua	AITC	726,828	51.84	Shyamaprasad Halder	BJP	522,854	37.29	203,974	14.55
21	Diamond Harbour	Abhishek Banerjee	AITC	791,127	56.13	Nilanjan Roy	BJP	470,533	33.39	320,594	22.74
22	Jadavpur	Mimi Chakraborty	AITC	688,472	47.90	Anupam Hazra	BJP	393,233	27.36	295,239	20.54
23	Kolkata Dakshin	Mala Roy	AITC	573,119	47.48	Chandra Kumar Bose	BJP	417,927	34.62	155,192	12.86
24	Kolkata Uttar	Sudip Bandyopadhyay	AITC	474,891	49.95	Rahul Sinha	BJP	347,796	36.59	127,095	13.36
25	Howrah	Prasun Banerjee	AITC	576,711	47.17	Rantidev Sengupta	BJP	473,016	38.69	103,695	8.48
26	Uluberia	Sajda Ahmed	AITC	694,945	53.00	Joy Banerjee	BJP	479,586	36.58	215,359	16.42
27	Sreerampur	Kalyan Banerjee	AITC	637,707	45.48	Debjit Sarkar	BJP	539,171	38.45	98,536	7.03
28	Hooghly	Locket Chatterjee	BJP	671,448	46.03	Ratna De Nag	AITC	598,086	41.00	73,362	5.03
29	Arambagh	Aparupa Poddar	AITC	649,929	44.14	Tapan Kumar Ray	BJP	648,787	44.06	1,142	0.08
30	Tamluk	Dibyendu Adhikari	AITC	724,433	50.07	Sidharthashankar Naskar	BJP	534,268	36.92	190,165	13.15
31	Kanthi	Sisir Adhikari	AITC	711,872	49.96	Debasis Samanta	BJP	600,204	42.12	111,668	7.84
32	Ghatal	Deepak Adhikari	AITC	717,959	48.21	Bharati Ghosh	BJP	609,986	40.96	107,973	7.25
33	Jhargram	Kunar Hembram	BJP	626,583	44.53	Birbaha Saren	AITC	614,816	43.69	11,767	0.84
34	Medinipur	Dilip Ghosh	BJP	685,433	48.60	Manas Bhunia	AITC	596,481	42.29	88,952	6.31
35	Purulia	Jyotirmay Mahato	BJP	668,107	49.28	Mriganko Mahato	AITC	463,375	34.18	204,732	15.10
36	Bankura	Subhas Sarkar	BJP	675,319	49.20	Subrata Mukherjee	AITC	500,986	36.50	174,333	12.70
37	Bishnupur	Saumitra Khan	BJP	657,019	46.23	Shyamal Santra	AITC	578,972	40.74	78,047	5.49
38	Bardhaman Purba	Sunil Kumar Mondal	AITC	640,834	44.51	Paresh Chandra Das	BJP	551,523	38.31	89,311	6.20
39	Bardhaman Durgapur	S. S. Ahluwalia	BJP	598,376	41.75	Mamtaz Sanghamita	AITC	595,937	41.58	2,439	0.17
40	Asansol	Babul Supriyo	BJP	633,378	51.16	Moon Moon Sen	AITC	435,741	35.19	197,637	15.97
41	Bolpur	Asit Kumar Mal	AITC	699,171	47.83	Ram Prasad Das	BJP	592,769	40.55	106,402	7.28
42	Birbhum	Satabdi Roy	AITC	654,077	45.11	Dudh Kumar Mondal	BJP	565,153	38.97	88,924	6.14

=== Constituency wise alliance or party votes ===
#	Constituency					
#	Constituency	TMC	NDA	UPA	Left	Margin
1	Cooch Behar	677,363	731,594	28,215	46,648	54,231
2	Alipurduars	506,815	750,804	27,427	54,010	243,989
3	Jalpaiguri	576,141	760,145	28,488	76,054	184,004
4	Darjeeling	336,624	750,067	65,186	50,524	413,443
5	Raiganj	451,078	511,652	83,662	183,039	60,574
6	Balurghat	506,024	539,317	36,783	72,990	33,293
7	Maldaha Uttar	425,236	509,524	305,270	50,401	84,288
8	Maldaha Dakshin	351,353	436,048	444,270	—N/a	8,222
9	Jangipur	562,838	317,056	255,836	95,501	245,782
10	Baharampur	510,410	143,038	591,147	13,362	80,696
11	Murshidabad	604,346	247,809	377,929	180,793	226,417
12	Krishnanagar	614,872	551,654	38,305	120,222	63,218
13	Ranaghat	549,825	783,254	23,297	97,771	233,428
14	Bangaon	576,028	687,622	22,618	90,122	1,11,594
15	Barrackpore	458,137	472,994	15,746	117,456	14,857
16	Dum Dum	512,062	459,060	29,097	167,590	53,002
17	Barasat	648,444	538,275	37,277	124,068	109,983
18	Basirhat	782,078	431,709	104,183	68,316	350,369
19	Jaynagar|	761,206	444,427	18,758	67,913	316,775
20	Mathurapur	726,828	522,854	32,324	92,417	203,974
21	Diamond Harbour	791,127	470,533	19,828	93,941	320,594
22	Jadavpur	688,472	393,233	—N/a	302,264	295,239
23	Kolkata Dakshin	573,119	417,927	42,618	140,275	155,192
24	Kolkata Uttar	474,891	347,796	26,093	71,080	127,095
25	Howrah	576,711	473,016	32,107	105,547	103,695
26	Uluberia	694,945	479,586	27,568	81,314	215,359
27	Sreerampur	637,707	539,171	32,509	152,281	98,536
28	Hooghly	598,086	671,448	25,374	121,588	73,362
29	Arambagh	649,929	648,787	25,128	100,520	1,142
30	Tamluk	724,433	534,268	16,001	136,129	190,165
31	Kanthi	711,872	600,204	16,851	76,185	1,11,668
32	Ghatal	717,959	609,986	32,793	97,062	1,07,973
33	Jhargram	614,816	626,583	20,754	75,680	11,767
34	Medinipur	596,481	685,433	20,807	62,319	88,952
35	Purulia	463,375	668,107	84,477	68,464	204,732
36	Bankura	500,986	675,319	20,472	100,282	174,333
37	Bishnupur	578,972	657,019	17,932	102,615	78,047
38	Bardhaman Purba	640,834	551,523	38,472	175,920	89,311
39	Bardhaman-Durgapur	595,937	598,376	38,516	161,329	2,439
40	Asansol	435,741	633,378	21,038	87,608	197,637
41	Bolpur	699,172	592,769	30,112	91,964	106,402
42	Birbhum	654,070	565,153	75,451	96,763	88,924

== Impact ==
There has been a major political shift from the left to the right in the 2019 general elections in West Bengal. The Statesman says, “Making an aggressive penetration in Bengal for the first time since its inception in 1980, BJP alone has dramatically increased its vote share close to 40 percent this time. Thus, it has virtually made the CPI-M into a mere marginalised political party and at the same time the saffron party set a strong challenge before the Trinamool Congress hardly two years ahead of the Assembly elections scheduled in 2021 in the state.” This obviously is the most important impact of the general elections in the state visible in the voting pattern right across the state, irrespective of who won or lost a particular seat.

== Post-election Union Council of Ministers from West Bengal ==
#	Name	Constituency	Designation	Department	From	To	Party
1	Babul Supriyo	Asansol	MoS	Ministry of Environment, Forest and Climate Change	31 May 2019	7 July 2021	BJP
2	Debasree Chaudhuri	Raiganj	MoS	Minister of Women and Child Development	31 May 2019	7 July 2021	BJP
3	Subhas Sarkar	Bankura	MoS	Ministry of Education	7 July 2021	9 June 2024	BJP
4	John Barla	Alipurduars	MoS	Minister of Minority Affairs	7 July 2021	9 June 2024	BJP
5	Shantanu Thakur	Bangaon	MoS	Minister of Ports, Shipping and Waterways	7 July 2021	9 June 2024	BJP
6	Nisith Pramanik	Cooch Behar	MoS	Ministry of Home Affairs; Minister of Youth Affairs and Sports	7 July 2021	9 June 2024	BJP

== Assembly wise lead of Parties ==
=== Partywise leads ===
2019 Lok Sabha in West Bengal by Assembly Segment

Party		Assembly segments	Position in assembly
AITC+	AITC	164	226
AITC+	Total	164	211
NDA	BJP	121	3
NDA	GJM	Did Not Contest	3
NDA	Total	121	6
UPA	INC	9	44
UPA	Total	9	44
LF	CPI(M)	0	26
LF	RSP	0	3
LF	AIFB	0	2
LF	CPI	0	1
LF	IND	0	1
LF	Total	0	33
Total		294	

=== Assembly seat wise leads ===
Constituency		Winner			Runner Up			Third			Margin
#	Name	Candidate	Party	Votes	Candidate	Party	Votes	Candidate	Party	Votes	Margin
Cooch Behar Lok Sabha constituency
2	Mathabhanga (SC)	Nisith Pramanik	BJP	1,07,063	Paresh Adhikary	AITC	86,188	Gobinda Chandra Roy	AIFB	5,757	20,875
3	Cooch Behar Uttar (SC)	Nisith Pramanik	BJP	1,18,606	Paresh Adhikary	AITC	91,380	Gobinda Chandra Roy	AIFB	9,910	27,226
4	Cooch Behar Dakshin	Nisith Pramanik	BJP	86,431	Paresh Adhikary	AITC	80,410	Gobinda Chandra Roy	AIFB	7,197	6,021
5	Sitalkuchi (SC)	Paresh Adhikary	AITC	1,09,771	Nisith Pramanik	BJP	1,08,541	Gobinda Chandra Roy	AIFB	7,000	1,230
6	Sitai (SC)	Paresh Adhikary	AITC	1,23,130	Nisith Pramanik	BJP	88,469	Piya Roy Chowdhury	INC	4,455	34,661
7	Dinhata	Nisith Pramanik	BJP	1,14,981	Paresh Adhikary	AITC	99,442	Gobinda Chandra Roy	AIFB	6,037	15,539
8	Natabari	Nisith Pramanik	BJP	1,04,543	Paresh Adhikary	AITC	86,018	Gobinda Chandra Roy	AIFB	7,679	18,525
Alipurduars Lok Sabha constituency
9	Tufanganj	John Barla	BJP	98,776	Dasrath Tirkey	AITC	91,290	Mili Oraon	RSP	5,392	7,486
10	Kumargram (ST)	John Barla	BJP	1,16,023	Dasrath Tirkey	AITC	87,210	Mili Oraon	RSP	9,343	28,813
11	Kalchini (ST)	John Barla	BJP	1,11,477	Dasrath Tirkey	AITC	64,045	Mohanlal Basumata	INC	4,860	47,432
12	Alipurduars	John Barla	BJP	1,14,879	Dasrath Tirkey	AITC	77,859	Mili Oraon	RSP	8,455	37,020
13	Falakata (SC)	John Barla	BJP	1,09,280	Dasrath Tirkey	AITC	82,210	Mili Oraon	RSP	10,248	27,070
14	Madarihat (ST)	John Barla	BJP	93,488	Dasrath Tirkey	AITC	49,650	Mili Oraon	RSP	5,586	43,838
21	Nagrakata (ST)	John Barla	BJP	1,03,865	Dasrath Tirkey	AITC	53,621	Mili Oraon	RSP	10,641	50,244
Jalpaiguri Lok Sabha constituency
1	Mekliganj (SC)	Jayanta Kumar Roy	BJP	87,140	Bijoy Chandra Barman	AITC	82,435	Bhagirath Chandra Roy	CPI(M)	8,153	4,705
15	Dhupguri (SC)	Jayanta Kumar Roy	BJP	1,05,729	Bijoy Chandra Barman	AITC	87,963	Bhagirath Chandra Roy	CPI(M)	13,016	17,766
16	Maynaguri (SC)	Jayanta Kumar Roy	BJP	1,10,819	Bijoy Chandra Barman	AITC	96,072	Bhagirath Chandra Roy	CPI(M)	5,916	14,747
17	Jalpaiguri (SC)	Jayanta Kumar Roy	BJP	1,12,147	Bijoy Chandra Barman	AITC	72,962	Bhagirath Chandra Roy	CPI(M)	16,412	39,185
18	Rajganj (SC)	Bijoy Chandra Barman	AITC	94,727	Jayanta Kumar Roy	BJP	90,407	Bhagirath Chandra Roy	CPI(M)	9,926	4,320
19	Dabgram-Fulbari	Jayanta Kumar Roy	BJP	1,50,566	Bijoy Chandra Barman	AITC	64,449	Bhagirath Chandra Roy	CPI(M)	13,408	86,117
20	Mal (ST)	Jayanta Kumar Roy	BJP	1,00,998	Bijoy Chandra Barman	AITC	76,939	Bhagirath Chandra Roy	CPI(M)	9,223	24,059
Darjeeling Lok Sabha constituency
22	Kalimpong	Raju Bista	BJP	96,877	Amar Singh Rai	AITC	34,302	Harka Bahadur Chhetri	JAP	3,362	62,575
23	Darjeeling	Raju Bista	BJP	1,19,428	Amar Singh Rai	AITC	33,604	Shankar Malakar	INC	2,761	85,824
24	Kurseong	Raju Bista	BJP	1,22,393	Amar Singh Rai	AITC	34,796	Shankar Malakar	INC	2,967	87,597
25	Matigara-Naxalbari (SC)	Raju Bista	BJP	1,44,175	Amar Singh Rai	AITC	45,277	Saman Pathak	CPI(M)	14,540	98,898
26	Siliguri	Raju Bista	BJP	1,05,148	Amar Singh Rai	AITC	39,662	Saman Pathak	CPI(M)	13,901	65,486
27	Phansidewa (ST)	Raju Bista	BJP	1,07,115	Amar Singh Rai	AITC	53,854	Shankar Malakar	INC	15,526	53,261
28	Chopra	Amar Singh Rai	AITC	94,298	Raju Bista	BJP	49,521	Shankar Malakar	INC	22,769	44,777
Raiganj Lok Sabha constituency
29	Islampur	Kanaia Lal Agarwal	AITC	60,976	Debasree Chaudhuri	BJP	56,531	Mohammed Salim	CPI(M)	30,479	4,445
30	Goalpokhar	Kanaia Lal Agarwal	AITC	79,682	Debasree Chaudhuri	BJP	31,441	Mohammed Salim	CPI(M)	30,078	48,241
31	Chakulia	Kanaia Lal Agarwal	AITC	59,129	Debasree Chaudhuri	BJP	51,304	Mohammed Salim	CPI(M)	40,348	7,825
32	Karandighi	Debasree Chaudhuri	BJP	82,009	Kanaia Lal Agarwal	AITC	66,045	Mohammed Salim	CPI(M)	30,488	15,964
33	Hemtabad (SC)	Debasree Chaudhuri	BJP	85,738	Kanaia Lal Agarwal	AITC	79,562	Mohammed Salim	CPI(M)	19,248	6,176
34	Kaliaganj (SC)	Debasree Chaudhuri	BJP	1,18,895	Kanaia Lal Agarwal	AITC	62,133	Mohammed Salim	CPI(M)	19,240	56,762
35	Raiganj	Debasree Chaudhuri	BJP	83,944	Kanaia Lal Agarwal	AITC	41,742	Mohammed Salim	CPI(M)	11,429	42,202
Balurghat Lok Sabha constituency
36	Itahar	Arpita Ghosh	AITC	87,506	Sukanta Majumdar	BJP	59,729	Abdus Sadeq Sarkar	INC	13,831	27,777
37	Kushmandi (SC)	Arpita Ghosh	AITC	77,648	Sukanta Majumdar	BJP	76,908	Ranen Barman	RSP	9,522	740
38	Kumarganj	Arpita Ghosh	AITC	81,518	Sukanta Majumdar	BJP	62,759	Ranen Barman	RSP	9,517	18,759
39	Balurghat	Sukanta Majumdar	BJP	81,293	Arpita Ghosh	AITC	42,277	Ranen Barman	RSP	14,816	39,016
40	Tapan (ST)	Sukanta Majumdar	BJP	89,737	Arpita Ghosh	AITC	66,483	Ranen Barman	RSP	12,485	23,254
41	Gangarampur (SC)	Sukanta Majumdar	BJP	92,138	Arpita Ghosh	AITC	70,053	Ranen Barman	RSP	8,802	22,085
42	Harirampur	Arpita Ghosh	AITC	79,978	Sukanta Majumdar	BJP	75,013	Ranen Barman	RSP	9,612	4,965
Maldaha Uttar Lok Sabha constituency
43	Habibpur (ST)	Khagen Murmu	BJP	1,05,630	Mausam Noor	AITC	53,794	Isha Khan Choudhury	INC	11,399	51,836
44	Gazole (SC)	Khagen Murmu	BJP	1,08,351	Mausam Noor	AITC	67,180	Isha Khan Choudhury	INC	18,550	41,171
45	Chanchal	Isha Khan Choudhury	INC	64,338	Mausam Noor	AITC	55,144	Khagen Murmu	BJP	48,987	9,194
46	Harishchandrapur	Mausam Noor	AITC	63,117	Isha Khan Choudhury	INC	60,605	Khagen Murmu	BJP	47,490	2,512
47	Malatipur	Isha Khan Choudhury	INC	64,438	Mausam Noor	AITC	58,794	Khagen Murmu	BJP	35,488	5,644
48	Ratua	Mausam Noor	AITC	76,008	Isha Khan Choudhury	INC	57,913	Khagen Murmu	BJP	55,027	18,095
50	Maldaha	Khagen Murmu	BJP	1,04,825	Mausam Noor	AITC	50,480	Isha Khan Choudhury	INC	27,721	54,345
Maldaha Dakshin Lok Sabha constituency
49	Manikchak	Sreerupa Mitra Chaudhury	BJP	81,809	Abu Hasem Khan Choudhury	INC	51,920	Moazzem Hossain	AITC	47,785	34,024
51	English Bazar	Sreerupa Mitra Chaudhury	BJP	1,32,860	Moazzem Hossain	AITC	38,478	Abu Hasem Khan Choudhury	INC	37,607	94,382
52	Mothabari	Abu Hasem Khan Choudhury	INC	61,393	Sreerupa Mitra Chaudhury	BJP	43,054	Moazzem Hossain	AITC	36,764	18,339
53	Sujapur	Abu Hasem Khan Choudhury	INC	91,168	Moazzem Hossain	AITC	62,558	Sreerupa Mitra Chaudhury	BJP	18,848	28,610
54	Baisnabnagar	Sreerupa Mitra Chaudhury	BJP	81,475	Moazzem Hossain	AITC	55,146	Abu Hasem Khan Choudhury	INC	52,291	29,184
55	Farakka	Abu Hasem Khan Choudhury	INC	76,107	Sreerupa Mitra Chaudhury	BJP	46,886	Moazzem Hossain	AITC	44,528	29,221
56	Samserganj	Abu Hasem Khan Choudhury	INC	73,054	Moazzem Hossain	AITC	65,115	Sreerupa Mitra Chaudhury	BJP	29,071	7,939
Jangipur Lok Sabha constituency
57	Suti	Khalilur Rahaman	AITC	94,911	Mafuja Khatun	BJP	50,957	Abhijit Mukherjee	INC	29,290	43,954
58	Jangipur	Khalilur Rahaman	AITC	79,527	Mafuja Khatun	BJP	66,193	Abhijit Mukherjee	INC	28,934	13,334
59	Raghunathganj	Khalilur Rahaman	AITC	93,156	Abhijit Mukherjee	INC	30,598	Mafuja Khatun	BJP	28,727	62,558
60	Sagardighi	Khalilur Rahaman	AITC	75,374	Mafuja Khatun	BJP	41,967	Abhijit Mukherjee	INC	40,626	33,407
61	Lalgola	Khalilur Rahaman	AITC	65,128	Abhijit Mukherjee	INC	46,588	Mafuja Khatun	BJP	28,172	18,540
65	Nabagram (SC)	Khalilur Rahaman	AITC	76,574	Mafuja Khatun	BJP	51,757	Abhijit Mukherjee	INC	48,089	24,817
66	Khargram (SC)	Khalilur Rahaman	AITC	77,848	Mafuja Khatun	BJP	48,374	Abhijit Mukherjee	INC	31,429	29,474
Baharampur Lok Sabha constituency
67	Burwan (SC)	Adhir Ranjan Chowdhury	INC	65,513	Apurba Sarkar	AITC	61,712	Krishna Joyardar	BJP	29,902	3,801
68	Kandi	Adhir Ranjan Chowdhury	INC	95,290	Apurba Sarkar	AITC	59,419	Krishna Joyardar	BJP	12,592	35,871
69	Bharatpur	Apurba Sarkar	AITC	81,200	Adhir Ranjan Chowdhury	INC	73,511	Krishna Joyardar	BJP	14,395	7,689
70	Rejinagar	Apurba Sarkar	AITC	99,691	Adhir Ranjan Chowdhury	INC	64,309	Krishna Joyardar	BJP	23,041	35,382
71	Beldanga	Apurba Sarkar	AITC	83,992	Adhir Ranjan Chowdhury	INC	80,904	Krishna Joyardar	BJP	18,790	3,088
72	Baharampur	Adhir Ranjan Chowdhury	INC	1,30,190	Apurba Sarkar	AITC	41,129	Krishna Joyardar	BJP	25,165	89,061
74	Nowda	Apurba Sarkar	AITC	82,743	Adhir Ranjan Chowdhury	INC	79,863	Krishna Joyardar	BJP	17,346	2,880
Murshidabad Lok Sabha constituency
62	Bhagabangola	Abu Taher Khan	AITC	93,108	Abu Hena	INC	68,136	Badaruddoza Khan	CPI(M)	25,911	24,972
63	Raninagar	Abu Taher Khan	AITC	94,455	Abu Hena	INC	54,993	Badaruddoza Khan	CPI(M)	33,725	39,462
64	Murshidabad	Humayun Kabir	BJP	80,966	Abu Taher Khan	AITC	77,567	Abu Hena	INC	39,297	3,399
73	Hariharpara	Abu Taher Khan	AITC	87,139	Abu Hena	INC	67,329	Badaruddoza Khan	CPI(M)	22,616	19,810
75	Domkal	Abu Taher Khan	AITC	84,808	Abu Hena	INC	71,112	Badaruddoza Khan	CPI(M)	35,719	13,696
76	Jalangi	Abu Taher Khan	AITC	79,434	Abu Hena	INC	54,757	Humayun Kabir	BJP	34,941	24,677
77	Karimpur	Abu Taher Khan	AITC	87,512	Humayun Kabir	BJP	73,173	Abu Hena	INC	22,097	14,339
Krishnanagar Lok Sabha constituency
78	Tehatta	Kalyan Chaubey	BJP	89,430	Mahua Moitra	AITC	87,369	Shantanu Jha	CPI(M)	18,087	2,061
79	Palashipara	Mahua Moitra	AITC	95,195	Kalyan Chaubey	BJP	59,135	Shantanu Jha	CPI(M)	20,605	36,060
80	Kaliganj	Mahua Moitra	AITC	99,839	Kalyan Chaubey	BJP	62,611	Shantanu Jha	CPI(M)	18,932	37,228
81	Nakashipara	Mahua Moitra	AITC	87,893	Kalyan Chaubey	BJP	82,813	Shantanu Jha	CPI(M)	15,978	5,080
82	Chapra	Mahua Moitra	AITC	1,04,975	Kalyan Chaubey	BJP	55,603	Shantanu Jha	CPI(M)	20,324	49,372
83	Krishnanagar Uttar	Kalyan Chaubey	BJP	1,15,875	Mahua Moitra	AITC	62,324	Shantanu Jha	CPI(M)	10,506	53,551
85	Krishnanagar Dakshin	Kalyan Chaubey	BJP	82,781	Mahua Moitra	AITC	76,057	Shantanu Jha	CPI(M)	15,584	6,724
Ranaghat Lok Sabha constituency
84	Nabadwip	Rupali Biswas	AITC	88,421	Jagannath Sarkar	BJP	84,357	Rama Biswas	CPI(M)	22,368	4,064
86	Shantipur	Jagannath Sarkar	BJP	1,12,599	Rupali Biswas	AITC	77,587	Rama Biswas	CPI(M)	11,628	35,012
87	Ranaghat Uttar Paschim	Jagannath Sarkar	BJP	1,19,000	Rupali Biswas	AITC	74,568	Rama Biswas	CPI(M)	14,121	44,432
88	Krishnaganj (SC)	Jagannath Sarkar	BJP	1,21,236	Rupali Biswas	AITC	83,729	Rama Biswas	CPI(M)	10,131	37,507
89	Ranaghat Uttar Purba (SC)	Jagannath Sarkar	BJP	1,16,837	Rupali Biswas	AITC	73,611	Rama Biswas	CPI(M)	6,633	43,226
90	Ranaghat Dakshin (SC)	Jagannath Sarkar	BJP	1,24,607	Rupali Biswas	AITC	79,676	Rama Biswas	CPI(M)	13,913	44,931
91	Chakdaha	Jagannath Sarkar	BJP	1,01,131	Rupali Biswas	AITC	71,144	Rama Biswas	CPI(M)	18,668	29,987
Bongaon Lok Sabha constituency
92	Kalyani (SC)	Shantanu Thakur	BJP	93,292	Mamata Bala Thakur	AITC	86,236	Alokesh Das	CPI(M)	16,893	7,056
93	Haringhata (SC)	Shantanu Thakur	BJP	94,366	Mamata Bala Thakur	AITC	84,899	Alokesh Das	CPI(M)	13,454	9,467
94	Bagdah (SC)	Shantanu Thakur	BJP	1,09,740	Mamata Bala Thakur	AITC	85,283	Alokesh Das	CPI(M)	6,957	24,457
95	Bongaon Uttar (SC)	Shantanu Thakur	BJP	1,04,558	Mamata Bala Thakur	AITC	76,188	Alokesh Das	CPI(M)	9,868	28,370
96	Bongaon Dakshin (SC)	Shantanu Thakur	BJP	1,05,156	Mamata Bala Thakur	AITC	76,628	Alokesh Das	CPI(M)	8,212	28,528
97	Gaighata (SC)	Shantanu Thakur	BJP	1,09,922	Mamata Bala Thakur	AITC	73,974	Alokesh Das	CPI(M)	11,815	35,948
98	Swarupnagar (SC)	Mamata Bala Thakur	AITC	92,174	Shantanu Thakur	BJP	68,203	Alokesh Das	CPI(M)	22,797	23,971
Barrackpore Lok Sabha constituency
102	Amdanga	Dinesh Trivedi	AITC	98,653	Arjun Singh	BJP	62,087	Gargi Chatterjee	CPI(M)	25,352	36,566
103	Bijpur	Arjun Singh	BJP	58,912	Dinesh Trivedi	AITC	51,016	Gargi Chatterjee	CPI(M)	14,385	7,896
104	Naihati	Arjun Singh	BJP	65,601	Dinesh Trivedi	AITC	64,375	Gargi Chatterjee	CPI(M)	13,361	1,226
105	Bhatpara	Arjun Singh	BJP	64,680	Dinesh Trivedi	AITC	34,973	Gargi Chatterjee	CPI(M)	4,524	29,707
106	Jagaddal	Arjun Singh	BJP	77,733	Dinesh Trivedi	AITC	69,369	Gargi Chatterjee	CPI(M)	18,138	8,364
107	Noapara	Dinesh Trivedi	AITC	78,957	Arjun Singh	BJP	78,431	Gargi Chatterjee	CPI(M)	24,886	526
108	Barrackpore	Arjun Singh	BJP	64,046	Dinesh Trivedi	AITC	60,527	Gargi Chatterjee	CPI(M)	16,708	3,519
Dum Dum Lok Sabha constituency
109	Khardaha	Saugata Roy	AITC	73,767	Samik Bhattacharya	BJP	72,499	Nepaldev Bhattacharya	CPI(M)	20,069	1,268
110	Dum Dum Uttar	Saugata Roy	AITC	83,995	Samik Bhattacharya	BJP	78,346	Nepaldev Bhattacharya	CPI(M)	35,604	5,649
111	Panihati	Saugata Roy	AITC	73,802	Samik Bhattacharya	BJP	64,071	Nepaldev Bhattacharya	CPI(M)	21,770	9,731
112	Kamarhati	Saugata Roy	AITC	63,356	Samik Bhattacharya	BJP	45,631	Nepaldev Bhattacharya	CPI(M)	21,433	17,725
113	Baranagar	Saugata Roy	AITC	70,176	Samik Bhattacharya	BJP	55,481	Nepaldev Bhattacharya	CPI(M)	23,561	14,695
114	Dum Dum	Saugata Roy	AITC	76,526	Samik Bhattacharya	BJP	71,414	Nepaldev Bhattacharya	CPI(M)	22,600	5,112
117	Rajarhat Gopalpur	Samik Bhattacharya	BJP	70,828	Saugata Roy	AITC	70,085	Nepaldev Bhattacharya	CPI(M)	22,212	743
Barasat Lok Sabha constituency
100	Habra	Mrinal Kanti Debnath	BJP	97,310	Kakoli Ghosh Dastidar	AITC	77,858	Haripada Biswas	AIFB	10,115	19,452
101	Ashoknagar	Kakoli Ghosh Dastidar	AITC	93,109	Mrinal Kanti Debnath	BJP	79,592	Haripada Biswas	AIFB	19,423	13,517
115	Rajarhat New Town	Kakoli Ghosh Dastidar	AITC	1,03,343	Mrinal Kanti Debnath	BJP	79,700	Haripada Biswas	AIFB	14,982	23,643
116	Bidhannagar	Mrinal Kanti Debnath	BJP	77,872	Kakoli Ghosh Dastidar	AITC	58,956	Haripada Biswas	AIFB	14,314	18,916
118	Madhyamgram	Kakoli Ghosh Dastidar	AITC	1,06,815	Mrinal Kanti Debnath	BJP	72,379	Haripada Biswas	AIFB	24,652	34,436
119	Barasat	Kakoli Ghosh Dastidar	AITC	93,023	Mrinal Kanti Debnath	BJP	89,433	Haripada Biswas	AIFB	21,033	3,590
120	Deganga	Kakoli Ghosh Dastidar	AITC	1,14,715	Mrinal Kanti Debnath	BJP	40,809	Haripada Biswas	AIFB	19,298	73,906
Basirhat Lok Sabha constituency
99	Baduria	Nusrat Jahan	AITC	96,216	Sayantan Basu	BJP	56,310	Quazi Abdur Rahim	INC	29,289	39,906
121	Haroa	Nusrat Jahan	AITC	1,34,543	Sayantan Basu	BJP	36,995	Quazi Abdur Rahim	INC	17,209	97,548
122	Minakhan (SC)	Nusrat Jahan	AITC	1,18,433	Sayantan Basu	BJP	51,867	Pallab Sengupta	CPI	10,387	66,566
123	Sandeshkhali (ST)	Nusrat Jahan	AITC	1,03,600	Sayantan Basu	BJP	76,688	Pallab Sengupta	CPI	5,545	26,912
124	Basirhat Dakshin	Nusrat Jahan	AITC	1,05,406	Sayantan Basu	BJP	90,506	Quazi Abdur Rahim	INC	13,949	14,900
125	Basirhat Uttar	Nusrat Jahan	AITC	1,27,736	Sayantan Basu	BJP	44,980	Quazi Abdur Rahim	INC	30,408	82,756
126	Hingalganj (SC)	Nusrat Jahan	AITC	95,986	Sayantan Basu	BJP	73,759	Pallab Sengupta	CPI	6,081	22,227
Joynagar Lok Sabha constituency
127	Gosaba (SC)	Pratima Mondal	AITC	1,01,522	Ashok Kandari	BJP	72,236	Subhas Naskar	RSP	3,171	29,286
128	Basanti (SC)	Pratima Mondal	AITC	1,13,384	Ashok Kandari	BJP	56,927	Subhas Naskar	RSP	12,539	56,457
129	Kultali (SC)	Pratima Mondal	AITC	87,106	Ashok Kandari	BJP	78,695	Joy Krishna Halder	SUCI(C)	21,949	8,411
136	Joynagar (SC)	Pratima Mondal	AITC	89,672	Ashok Kandari	BJP	73,095	Joy Krishna Halder	SUCI(C)	7,808	16,577
138	Canning Paschim (SC)	Pratima Mondal	AITC	1,02,402	Ashok Kandari	BJP	77,056	Subhas Naskar	RSP	10,923	25,346
139	Canning Purba	Pratima Mondal	AITC	1,66,897	Ashok Kandari	BJP	23,724	Subhas Naskar	RSP	7,375	1,43,173
141	Magrahat Purba (SC)	Pratima Mondal	AITC	99,951	Ashok Kandari	BJP	62,307	Subhas Naskar	RSP	15,832	37,644
Mathurapur Lok Sabha constituency
130	Patharpratima	Choudhury Mohan Jatua	AITC	1,13,060	Shyama Prasad Halder	BJP	77,281	Sarat Chandra Halder	CPI(M)	17,138	35,779
131	Kakdwip	Choudhury Mohan Jatua	AITC	1,06,230	Shyama Prasad Halder	BJP	80,747	Sarat Chandra Halder	CPI(M)	9,730	25,483
132	Sagar	Choudhury Mohan Jatua	AITC	1,19,070	Shyama Prasad Halder	BJP	87,058	Sarat Chandra Halder	CPI(M)	13,896	32,012
133	Kulpi	Choudhury Mohan Jatua	AITC	90,512	Shyama Prasad Halder	BJP	64,824	Sarat Chandra Halder	CPI(M)	10,560	25,688
134	Raidighi	Choudhury Mohan Jatua	AITC	1,04,261	Shyama Prasad Halder	BJP	91,342	Sarat Chandra Halder	CPI(M)	16,123	12,919
135	Mandirbazar (SC)	Choudhury Mohan Jatua	AITC	93,819	Shyama Prasad Halder	BJP	72,595	Sarat Chandra Halder	CPI(M)	12,496	21,224
142	Magrahat Paschim	Choudhury Mohan Jatua	AITC	99,551	Shyama Prasad Halder	BJP	48,420	Sarat Chandra Halder	CPI(M)	12,429	51,131
Diamond Harbour Lok Sabha constituency
143	Diamond Harbour	Abhishek Banerjee	AITC	1,09,134	Nilanjan Roy	BJP	73,673	Fuad Halim	CPI(M)	16,904	35,461
144	Falta	Abhishek Banerjee	AITC	1,14,689	Nilanjan Roy	BJP	70,912	Fuad Halim	CPI(M)	5,456	43,777
145	Satgachhia	Abhishek Banerjee	AITC	1,11,540	Nilanjan Roy	BJP	86,761	Fuad Halim	CPI(M)	14,943	24,779
146	Bishnupur (SC)	Abhishek Banerjee	AITC	1,17,617	Nilanjan Roy	BJP	73,529	Fuad Halim	CPI(M)	16,642	44,088
155	Maheshtala	Abhishek Banerjee	AITC	98,092	Nilanjan Roy	BJP	69,252	Fuad Halim	CPI(M)	21,276	28,840
156	Budge Budge	Abhishek Banerjee	AITC	1,19,675	Nilanjan Roy	BJP	63,118	Fuad Halim	CPI(M)	9,411	56,557
157	Metiaburuz	Abhishek Banerjee	AITC	1,19,978	Nilanjan Roy	BJP	32,802	Fuad Halim	CPI(M)	9,201	87,176
Jadavpur Lok Sabha constituency
137	Baruipur Purba (SC)	Mimi Chakraborty	AITC	99,719	Anupam Hazra	BJP	72,214	Bikash Ranjan Bhattacharya	CPI(M)	23,793	27,505
140	Baruipur Paschim	Mimi Chakraborty	AITC	94,359	Anupam Hazra	BJP	59,327	Bikash Ranjan Bhattacharya	CPI(M)	30,969	35,032
147	Sonarpur Dakshin	Mimi Chakraborty	AITC	88,354	Anupam Hazra	BJP	73,800	Bikash Ranjan Bhattacharya	CPI(M)	43,550	14,554
148	Bhangar	Mimi Chakraborty	AITC	1,46,723	Bikash Ranjan Bhattacharya	CPI(M)	34,758	Anupam Hazra	BJP	24,963	1,11,965
150	Jadavpur	Mimi Chakraborty	AITC	80,670	Bikash Ranjan Bhattacharya	CPI(M)	68,515	Anupam Hazra	BJP	48,696	12,155
151	Sonarpur Uttar	Mimi Chakraborty	AITC	1,00,167	Anupam Hazra	BJP	67,796	Bikash Ranjan Bhattacharya	CPI(M)	41,159	32,371
152	Tollygunge	Mimi Chakraborty	AITC	77,781	Bikash Ranjan Bhattacharya	CPI(M)	58,816	Anupam Hazra	BJP	45,814	18,965
Kolkata Dakshin Lok Sabha constituency
149	Kasba	Mala Roy	AITC	98,535	Chandra Kumar Bose	BJP	63,894	Nandini Mukherjee	CPI(M)	29,582	34,641
153	Behala Purba	Mala Roy	AITC	89,341	Chandra Kumar Bose	BJP	73,483	Nandini Mukherjee	CPI(M)	32,794	15,858
154	Behala Paschim	Mala Roy	AITC	91,216	Chandra Kumar Bose	BJP	75,051	Nandini Mukherjee	CPI(M)	39,836	16,165
158	Kolkata Port	Mala Roy	AITC	82,102	Chandra Kumar Bose	BJP	45,863	Mita Chakraborty	INC	8,941	36,239
159	Bhabanipur	Mala Roy	AITC	61,137	Chandra Kumar Bose	BJP	57,969	Nandini Mukherjee	CPI(M)	8,700	3,168
160	Rashbehari	Chandra Kumar Bose	BJP	57,976	Mala Roy	AITC	52,555	Nandini Mukherjee	CPI(M)	16,364	5,421
161	Ballygunge	Mala Roy	AITC	97,302	Chandra Kumar Bose	BJP	42,850	Mita Chakraborty	INC	8,591	54,452
Kolkata Uttar Lok Sabha constituency
162	Chowrangee	Sudip Bandyopadhyay	AITC	65,445	Rahul Sinha	BJP	38,885	Syed Shahid Imam	INC	6,439	26,560
163	Entally	Sudip Bandyopadhyay	AITC	89,711	Rahul Sinha	BJP	48,391	Kaninika Bose	CPI(M)	8,137	41,320
164	Beleghata	Sudip Bandyopadhyay	AITC	97,583	Rahul Sinha	BJP	46,681	Kaninika Bose	CPI(M)	10,767	50,902
165	Jorasanko	Rahul Sinha	BJP	51,147	Sudip Bandyopadhyay	AITC	47,265	Kaninika Bose	CPI(M)	6,020	3,882
166	Shyampukur	Rahul Sinha	BJP	48,905	Sudip Bandyopadhyay	AITC	46,735	Kaninika Bose	CPI(M)	13,569	2,170
167	Maniktala	Sudip Bandyopadhyay	AITC	61,134	Rahul Sinha	BJP	60,273	Kaninika Bose	CPI(M)	13,522	861
168	Kashipur-Belgachhia	Sudip Bandyopadhyay	AITC	66,617	Rahul Sinha	BJP	53,025	Kaninika Bose	CPI(M)	14,373	13,592
Howrah Lok Sabha constituency
169	Bally	Prasun Banerjee	AITC	51,951	Rantidev Sengupta	BJP	51,656	Sumitro Adhikary	CPI(M)	13,125	295
170	Howrah Uttar	Rantidev Sengupta	BJP	67,017	Prasun Banerjee	AITC	64,056	Sumitro Adhikary	CPI(M)	6,645	2,961
171	Howrah Madhya	Prasun Banerjee	AITC	87,747	Rantidev Sengupta	BJP	69,673	Sumitro Adhikary	CPI(M)	14,431	18,074
172	Shibpur	Prasun Banerjee	AITC	75,355	Rantidev Sengupta	BJP	66,644	Sumitro Adhikary	CPI(M)	19,933	8,711
173	Howrah Dakshin	Prasun Banerjee	AITC	97,699	Rantidev Sengupta	BJP	73,115	Sumitro Adhikary	CPI(M)	22,033	24,584
174	Sankrail (SC)	Prasun Banerjee	AITC	96,124	Rantidev Sengupta	BJP	75,019	Sumitro Adhikary	CPI(M)	18,445	21,105
175	Panchla	Prasun Banerjee	AITC	1,03,567	Rantidev Sengupta	BJP	69,332	Sumitro Adhikary	CPI(M)	10,809	34,235
Uluberia Lok Sabha constituency
176	Uluberia Purba	Sajda Ahmed	AITC	86,179	Joy Banerjee	BJP	66,391	Maksuda Khatun	CPI(M)	17,353	19,788
177	Uluberia Uttar (SC)	Sajda Ahmed	AITC	82,871	Joy Banerjee	BJP	68,888	Maksuda Khatun	CPI(M)	10,783	13,983
178	Uluberia Dakshin	Sajda Ahmed	AITC	96,445	Joy Banerjee	BJP	71,498	Maksuda Khatun	CPI(M)	10,574	24,947
179	Shyampur	Sajda Ahmed	AITC	1,07,867	Joy Banerjee	BJP	76,573	Maksuda Khatun	CPI(M)	11,693	31,294
180	Bagnan	Sajda Ahmed	AITC	1,09,070	Joy Banerjee	BJP	60,776	Maksuda Khatun	CPI(M)	10,629	48,294
181	Amta	Sajda Ahmed	AITC	1,04,259	Joy Banerjee	BJP	66,785	Maksuda Khatun	CPI(M)	13,763	37,474
182	Udaynarayanpur	Sajda Ahmed	AITC	1,07,926	Joy Banerjee	BJP	68,105	Maksuda Khatun	CPI(M)	6,354	39,821
Sreerampur Lok Sabha constituency
183	Jagatballavpur	Kalyan Banerjee	AITC	1,00,571	Debjit Sarkar	BJP	88,641	Tirthankar Roy	CPI(M)	18,449	11,930
184	Domjur	Kalyan Banerjee	AITC	1,25,410	Debjit Sarkar	BJP	70,377	Tirthankar Roy	CPI(M)	21,674	55,033
185	Uttarpara	Kalyan Banerjee	AITC	75,438	Debjit Sarkar	BJP	71,947	Tirthankar Roy	CPI(M)	34,233	3,491
186	Sreerampur	Debjit Sarkar	BJP	75,326	Kalyan Banerjee	AITC	72,823	Tirthankar Roy	CPI(M)	19,223	2,503
187	Champdani	Kalyan Banerjee	AITC	80,930	Debjit Sarkar	BJP	79,071	Tirthankar Roy	CPI(M)	19,292	1,859
194	Chanditala	Kalyan Banerjee	AITC	88,101	Debjit Sarkar	BJP	70,885	Tirthankar Roy	CPI(M)	24,892	17,216
195	Jangipara	Kalyan Banerjee	AITC	93,958	Debjit Sarkar	BJP	82,026	Tirthankar Roy	CPI(M)	14,927	11,932
Hooghly Lok Sabha constituency
188	Singur	Locket Chatterjee	BJP	93,177	Ratna De Nag	AITC	82,748	Pradip Saha	CPI(M)	17,632	10,429
189	Chandannagar	Ratna De Nag	AITC	71,196	Locket Chatterjee	BJP	68,321	Pradip Saha	CPI(M)	23,460	2,875
190	Chunchura	Locket Chatterjee	BJP	1,16,603	Ratna De Nag	AITC	95,587	Pradip Saha	CPI(M)	22,797	21,016
191	Balagarh (SC)	Locket Chatterjee	BJP	1,10,175	Ratna De Nag	AITC	76,121	Pradip Saha	CPI(M)	15,163	34,054
192	Pandua	Locket Chatterjee	BJP	89,883	Ratna De Nag	AITC	89,181	Pradip Saha	CPI(M)	25,141	702
193	Saptagram	Locket Chatterjee	BJP	94,392	Ratna De Nag	AITC	72,807	Pradip Saha	CPI(M)	9,377	21,585
197	Dhanekhali (SC)	Ratna De Nag	AITC	1,09,842	Locket Chatterjee	BJP	97,480	Pradip Saha	CPI(M)	7,759	12,362
Arambagh Lok Sabha constituency
196	Haripal	Aparupa Poddar	AITC	95,295	Tapan Kumar Ray	BJP	85,731	Sakti Mohan Malik	CPI(M)	20,497	9,564
198	Tarakeswar	Aparupa Poddar	AITC	88,096	Tapan Kumar Ray	BJP	83,753	Sakti Mohan Malik	CPI(M)	15,747	4,343
199	Pursurah	Tapan Kumar Ray	BJP	1,07,759	Aparupa Poddar	AITC	81,917	Sakti Mohan Malik	CPI(M)	10,887	25,842
200	Arambagh (SC)	Aparupa Poddar	AITC	93,883	Tapan Kumar Ray	BJP	89,876	Sakti Mohan Malik	CPI(M)	11,643	4,007
201	Goghat (SC)	Tapan Kumar Ray	BJP	95,284	Aparupa Poddar	AITC	87,217	Sakti Mohan Malik	CPI(M)	14,947	8,067
202	Khanakul	Aparupa Poddar	AITC	96,405	Tapan Kumar Ray	BJP	82,183	Sakti Mohan Malik	CPI(M)	11,825	14,222
232	Chandrakona (SC)	Aparupa Poddar	AITC	1,06,800	Tapan Kumar Ray	BJP	1,03,169	Sakti Mohan Malik	CPI(M)	14,827	3,631
Tamluk Lok Sabha constituency
203	Tamluk	Dibyendu Adhikari	AITC	93,680	Siddhartha Naskar	BJP	87,132	Sheikh Ibrahim Ali	CPI(M)	27,958	6,548
204	Panskura Purba	Dibyendu Adhikari	AITC	79,437	Siddhartha Naskar	BJP	72,057	Sheikh Ibrahim Ali	CPI(M)	21,054	7,380
206	Moyna	Dibyendu Adhikari	AITC	1,00,880	Siddhartha Naskar	BJP	88,497	Sheikh Ibrahim Ali	CPI(M)	12,389	12,383
207	Nandakumar	Dibyendu Adhikari	AITC	97,474	Siddhartha Naskar	BJP	82,116	Sheikh Ibrahim Ali	CPI(M)	24,918	15,358
208	Mahisadal	Dibyendu Adhikari	AITC	96,215	Siddhartha Naskar	BJP	79,299	Sheikh Ibrahim Ali	CPI(M)	21,835	16,916
209	Haldia (SC)	Dibyendu Adhikari	AITC	1,25,296	Siddhartha Naskar	BJP	61,475	Sheikh Ibrahim Ali	CPI(M)	18,355	63,821
210	Nandigram	Dibyendu Adhikari	AITC	1,30,659	Siddhartha Naskar	BJP	62,268	Sheikh Ibrahim Ali	CPI(M)	9,353	68,391
Kanthi Lok Sabha constituency
211	Chandipur	Sisir Adhikari	AITC	99,573	Debasish Samanta	BJP	84,110	Paritosh Pattanayak	CPI(M)	17,119	15,463
212	Patashpur	Sisir Adhikari	AITC	99,048	Debasish Samanta	BJP	84,693	Paritosh Pattanayak	CPI(M)	8,757	14,355
213	Kanthi Uttar	Sisir Adhikari	AITC	1,05,033	Debasish Samanta	BJP	91,959	Paritosh Pattanayak	CPI(M)	11,891	13,074
214	Bhagabanpur	Sisir Adhikari	AITC	1,17,197	Debasish Samanta	BJP	79,806	Paritosh Pattanayak	CPI(M)	11,750	37,391
215	Khejuri (SC)	Sisir Adhikari	AITC	96,506	Debasish Samanta	BJP	90,953	Paritosh Pattanayak	CPI(M)	7,215	5,553
216	Kanthi Dakshin	Sisir Adhikari	AITC	93,792	Debasish Samanta	BJP	74,777	Paritosh Pattanayak	CPI(M)	8,712	19,015
217	Ramnagar	Sisir Adhikari	AITC	1,00,084	Debasish Samanta	BJP	92,318	Paritosh Pattanayak	CPI(M)	10,558	7,766
Ghatal Lok Sabha constituency
205	Panskura Paschim	Bharati Ghosh	BJP	97,528	Deepak Adhikari	AITC	94,683	Tapan Ganguly	CPI	13,074	2,845
226	Sabang	Deepak Adhikari	AITC	94,798	Bharati Ghosh	BJP	88,628	Tapan Ganguly	CPI	19,318	6,170
227	Pingla	Deepak Adhikari	AITC	99,760	Bharati Ghosh	BJP	98,062	Tapan Ganguly	CPI	9,893	1,698
229	Debra	Bharati Ghosh	BJP	84,618	Deepak Adhikari	AITC	80,599	Tapan Ganguly	CPI	21,636	4,019
230	Daspur	Deepak Adhikari	AITC	99,246	Bharati Ghosh	BJP	89,306	Tapan Ganguly	CPI	17,569	9,940
231	Ghatal (SC)	Deepak Adhikari	AITC	1,03,331	Bharati Ghosh	BJP	97,465	Tapan Ganguly	CPI	8,156	5,866
235	Keshpur (SC)	Deepak Adhikari	AITC	1,44,990	Bharati Ghosh	BJP	52,916	Tapan Ganguly	CPI	7,297	92,074
Jhargram Lok Sabha constituency
220	Nayagram (ST)	Kunar Hembram	BJP	84,316	Birbaha Soren	AITC	80,978	Deblina Hembram	CPI(M)	7,305	3,338
221	Gopiballavpur	Kunar Hembram	BJP	89,034	Birbaha Soren	AITC	82,205	Deblina Hembram	CPI(M)	6,128	6,829
222	Jhargram	Kunar Hembram	BJP	83,812	Birbaha Soren	AITC	82,169	Deblina Hembram	CPI(M)	9,571	1,643
233	Nayagram	Kunar Hembram	BJP	91,328	Birbaha Soren	AITC	84,517	Deblina Hembram	CPI(M)	10,343	6,811
234	Salboni	Birbaha Soren	AITC	1,12,431	Kunar Hembram	BJP	1,03,706	Deblina Hembram	CPI(M)	11,024	8,725
237	Binpur (ST)	Birbaha Soren	AITC	76,197	Kunar Hembram	BJP	73,138	Deblina Hembram	CPI(M)	10,301	3,059
238	Bandwan (ST)	Kunar Hembram	BJP	98,039	Birbaha Soren	AITC	95,069	Deblina Hembram	CPI(M)	20,707	2,970
Medinipur Lok Sabha constituency
218	Egra	Dilip Ghosh	BJP	1,09,509	Manas Bhunia	AITC	1,00,815	Biplab Bhatta	CPI	8,977	8,694
219	Dantan	Dilip Ghosh	BJP	92,413	Manas Bhunia	AITC	85,724	Biplab Bhatta	CPI	5,883	6,689
223	Keshiary (ST)	Dilip Ghosh	BJP	1,00,032	Manas Bhunia	AITC	89,158	Biplab Bhatta	CPI	7,545	10,874
224	Kharagpur Sadar	Dilip Ghosh	BJP	93,425	Manas Bhunia	AITC	48,293	Sambhunath Chatterjee	INC	8,274	45,132
225	Narayangarh	Dilip Ghosh	BJP	97,324	Manas Bhunia	AITC	88,574	Biplab Bhatta	CPI	11,568	8,750
228	Kharagpur	Manas Bhunia	AITC	89,677	Dilip Ghosh	BJP	80,210	Biplab Bhatta	CPI	10,116	9,467
236	Medinipur	Dilip Ghosh	BJP	1,10,372	Manas Bhunia	AITC	93,731	Biplab Bhatta	CPI	9,987	16,641
Purulia Lok Sabha constituency
239	Balarampur	Jyotirmay Singh Mahato	BJP	1,00,419	Mriganko Mahato	AITC	64,950	Nepal Mahata	INC	6,709	35,469
240	Baghmundi	Jyotirmay Singh Mahato	BJP	1,00,312	Mriganko Mahato	AITC	47,604	Nepal Mahata	INC	29,518	52,708
241	Joypur	Jyotirmay Singh Mahato	BJP	88,087	Mriganko Mahato	AITC	56,343	Nepal Mahata	INC	26,989	31,744
242	Purulia	Jyotirmay Singh Mahato	BJP	1,02,749	Mriganko Mahato	AITC	66,252	Bir Singh Mahato	AIFB	9,994	36,497
243	Manbazar (ST)	Mriganko Mahato	AITC	93,897	Jyotirmay Singh Mahato	BJP	83,314	Bir Singh Mahato	AIFB	13,440	10,583
244	Kashipur	Jyotirmay Singh Mahato	BJP	91,079	Mriganko Mahato	AITC	74,925	Bir Singh Mahato	AIFB	7,368	16,154
245	Para (SC)	Jyotirmay Singh Mahato	BJP	1,00,056	Mriganko Mahato	AITC	58,814	Bir Singh Mahato	AIFB	9,048	41,242
Bankura Lok Sabha constituency
246	Raghunathpur (SC)	Subhas Sarkar	BJP	1,09,832	Subrata Mukherjee	AITC	67,199	Amiya Patra	CPI(M)	11,566	42,633
247	Saltora (SC)	Subhas Sarkar	BJP	89,073	Subrata Mukherjee	AITC	74,017	Amiya Patra	CPI(M)	13,648	15,056
248	Chhatna	Subhas Sarkar	BJP	95,661	Subrata Mukherjee	AITC	64,479	Amiya Patra	CPI(M)	11,132	31,182
249	Ranibandh (ST)	Subhas Sarkar	BJP	93,956	Subrata Mukherjee	AITC	78,142	Amiya Patra	CPI(M)	16,538	15,814
250	Raipur (ST)	Subhas Sarkar	BJP	83,774	Subrata Mukherjee	AITC	80,423	Amiya Patra	CPI(M)	11,418	3,351
251	Taldangra	Subhas Sarkar	BJP	87,826	Subrata Mukherjee	AITC	70,558	Amiya Patra	CPI(M)	20,569	17,268
252	Bankura	Subhas Sarkar	BJP	1,12,080	Subrata Mukherjee	AITC	65,304	Amiya Patra	CPI(M)	15,143	46,776
Bishnupur Lok Sabha constituency
253	Barjora	Saumitra Khan	BJP	91,736	Shyamal Santra	AITC	80,116	Sunil Khan	CPI(M)	23,171	11,620
254	Onda	Saumitra Khan	BJP	1,06,788	Shyamal Santra	AITC	80,415	Sunil Khan	CPI(M)	8,866	26,373
255	Bishnupur	Saumitra Khan	BJP	89,806	Shyamal Santra	AITC	66,988	Sunil Khan	CPI(M)	13,753	22,818
256	Kotulpur (SC)	Saumitra Khan	BJP	97,907	Shyamal Santra	AITC	88,808	Sunil Khan	CPI(M)	14,081	9,099
257	Indas (SC)	Saumitra Khan	BJP	98,184	Shyamal Santra	AITC	84,591	Sunil Khan	CPI(M)	12,106	13,593
258	Sonamukhi (SC)	Saumitra Khan	BJP	98,983	Shyamal Santra	AITC	75,148	Sunil Khan	CPI(M)	11,070	23,835
259	Khandaghosh (SC)	Shyamal Santra	AITC	1,02,494	Saumitra Khan	BJP	71,500	Sunil Khan	CPI(M)	19,451	30,994
Bardhaman Purba Lok Sabha constituency
261	Raina (SC)	Sunil Kumar Mondal	AITC	1,13,180	Paresh Chandra Das	BJP	58,331	Ishwar Chandra Das	CPI(M)	33,510	54,849
262	Jamalpur (SC)	Sunil Kumar Mondal	AITC	81,941	Paresh Chandra Das	BJP	78,257	Ishwar Chandra Das	CPI(M)	26,007	3,684
264	Kalna (SC)	Sunil Kumar Mondal	AITC	86,357	Paresh Chandra Das	BJP	82,724	Ishwar Chandra Das	CPI(M)	19,661	3,633
265	Memari	Sunil Kumar Mondal	AITC	86,282	Paresh Chandra Das	BJP	81,383	Ishwar Chandra Das	CPI(M)	28,780	4,899
268	Purbasthali Dakshin	Sunil Kumar Mondal	AITC	1,00,240	Paresh Chandra Das	BJP	78,332	Ishwar Chandra Das	CPI(M)	17,836	21,908
269	Purbasthali Uttar	Sunil Kumar Mondal	AITC	85,174	Paresh Chandra Das	BJP	82,469	Ishwar Chandra Das	CPI(M)	26,763	2,705
270	Katwa	Paresh Chandra Das	BJP	89,175	Sunil Kumar Mondal	AITC	87,316	Ishwar Chandra Das	CPI(M)	23,211	1,859
Bardhaman–Durgapur Lok Sabha constituency
260	Bardhaman Dakshin	Mamtaz Sanghamita	AITC	85,301	S. S. Ahluwalia	BJP	83,963	Abhas Roy Chowdhury	CPI(M)	18,848	1,338
263	Monteshwar	Mamtaz Sanghamita	AITC	95,202	S. S. Ahluwalia	BJP	67,166	Abhas Roy Chowdhury	CPI(M)	23,435	28,036
266	Bardhaman Uttar (SC)	Mamtaz Sanghamita	AITC	1,08,663	S. S. Ahluwalia	BJP	80,617	Abhas Roy Chowdhury	CPI(M)	25,373	28,046
267	Bhatar	Mamtaz Sanghamita	AITC	99,383	S. S. Ahluwalia	BJP	72,919	Abhas Roy Chowdhury	CPI(M)	21,427	26,464
274	Galsi (SC)	S. S. Ahluwalia	BJP	93,177	Mamtaz Sanghamita	AITC	83,556	Abhas Roy Chowdhury	CPI(M)	21,712	9,621
276	Durgapur Purba	S. S. Ahluwalia	BJP	90,455	Mamtaz Sanghamita	AITC	63,864	Abhas Roy Chowdhury	CPI(M)	28,297	26,591
277	Durgapur Paschim	S. S. Ahluwalia	BJP	1,09,153	Mamtaz Sanghamita	AITC	59,642	Abhas Roy Chowdhury	CPI(M)	22,011	49,511
Asansol Lok Sabha constituency
275	Pandabeswar	Babul Supriyo	BJP	70,296	Moon Moon Sen	AITC	64,275	Gouranga Chatterjee	CPI(M)	11,583	6,021
278	Raniganj	Babul Supriyo	BJP	92,882	Moon Moon Sen	AITC	61,172	Gouranga Chatterjee	CPI(M)	18,436	31,710
279	Jamuria	Babul Supriyo	BJP	76,051	Moon Moon Sen	AITC	57,999	Gouranga Chatterjee	CPI(M)	15,549	18,052
280	Asansol Dakshin	Babul Supriyo	BJP	1,11,021	Moon Moon Sen	AITC	57,201	Gouranga Chatterjee	CPI(M)	14,394	53,820
281	Asansol Uttar	Babul Supriyo	BJP	98,020	Moon Moon Sen	AITC	77,706	Gouranga Chatterjee	CPI(M)	9,843	20,314
282	Kulti	Babul Supriyo	BJP	1,05,176	Moon Moon Sen	AITC	55,825	Gouranga Chatterjee	CPI(M)	5,987	49,351
283	Barabani	Babul Supriyo	BJP	79,281	Moon Moon Sen	AITC	61,406	Gouranga Chatterjee	CPI(M)	11,761	17,875
Bolpur Lok Sabha constituency
271	Ketugram	Asit Kumar Mal	AITC	1,02,679	Ram Prasad Das	BJP	75,165	Ram Chandra Dome	CPI(M)	14,034	27,514
272	Mangalkot	Asit Kumar Mal	AITC	1,05,397	Ram Prasad Das	BJP	76,170	Ram Chandra Dome	CPI(M)	13,211	29,227
273	Ausgram (SC)	Asit Kumar Mal	AITC	95,460	Ram Prasad Das	BJP	80,592	Ram Chandra Dome	CPI(M)	18,391	14,868
286	Bolpur	Asit Kumar Mal	AITC	1,06,172	Ram Prasad Das	BJP	90,560	Ram Chandra Dome	CPI(M)	14,076	15,612
287	Nanoor (SC)	Asit Kumar Mal	AITC	1,08,717	Ram Prasad Das	BJP	90,986	Ram Chandra Dome	CPI(M)	14,129	17,731
288	Labhpur	Asit Kumar Mal	AITC	94,515	Ram Prasad Das	BJP	90,712	Ram Chandra Dome	CPI(M)	8,217	3,803
290	Mayureswar	Ram Prasad Das	BJP	87,260	Asit Kumar Mal	AITC	85,501	Ram Chandra Dome	CPI(M)	9,773	1,759
Birbhum Lok Sabha constituency
284	Dubrajpur (SC)	Dudh Kumar Mondal	BJP	95,466	Satabdi Roy	AITC	80,954	Rezaul Karim	CPI(M)	7,159	14,512
285	Suri	Dudh Kumar Mondal	BJP	1,00,228	Satabdi Roy	AITC	91,097	Rezaul Karim	CPI(M)	10,120	9,131
289	Sainthia (SC)	Dudh Kumar Mondal	BJP	97,010	Satabdi Roy	AITC	96,795	Rezaul Karim	CPI(M)	8,041	215
291	Rampurhat	Dudh Kumar Mondal	BJP	98,174	Satabdi Roy	AITC	85,049	Rezaul Karim	CPI(M)	13,666	13,125
292	Hansan	Satabdi Roy	AITC	91,351	Dudh Kumar Mondal	BJP	61,441	Rezaul Karim	CPI(M)	20,040	29,910
293	Nalhati	Satabdi Roy	AITC	89,970	Dudh Kumar Mondal	BJP	62,589	Imam Hossain	INC	20,276	27,381
294	Murarai	Satabdi Roy	AITC	1,18,210	Dudh Kumar Mondal	BJP	48,807	Rezaul Karim	CPI(M)	18,251	69,403

=== Postal ballot wise leads ===

Party		Leads in 2019
AITC+	Trinamool Congress	2
NDA	Bharatiya Janata Party	39
LF	CPI(M)	1
Total		42

== Region-Wise Results ==
District	Seats								
District	Seats	AITC		BJP		INC		CPI(M)	
East Bengal (Ganges Delta Region)	10	7	▼3	3	▲3	0	Steady	0	Steady
North Bengal	8	3	▲1	3	▲3	2	▼2	0	▼2
Northern Hills	4	0	▼3	4	▲3	0	Steady	0	Steady
West Bengal (Rarh Region)	10	3	▼7	7	▲7	0	Steady	0	Steady
South Bengal	10	9	▼1	1	Steady	0	Steady	0	Steady
Total	42	22	▼12	18	▲16	2	▼2	0	▼2

== See also ==
- Politics of West Bengal
- 2014 Indian general election in West Bengal
- 2021 West Bengal Legislative Assembly election
- 2024 Indian general election in West Bengal
- 2026 West Bengal Legislative Assembly election
