= Bikash Ranjan Bhattacharya =

Indian politician

Member of Parliament, Rajya Sabha
- In office 3 April 2020 – 2 April 2026
- President: Ramnath Kovind; Droupadi Murmu
- Chairman of the House: Venkaiah Naidu; Jagdeep Dhankhar; C. P. Radhakrishnan
- Preceded by: Ritabrata Banerjee
- Succeeded by: Rahul Sinha
- Constituency: West Bengal

36th Mayor of Kolkata
- In office 5 July 2005 – 16 June 2010
- Deputy: Kalyan Mukherjee
- Preceded by: Subrata Mukherjee
- Succeeded by: Sovan Chatterjee
- Constituency: Ward No. 100

Personal details
- Born: 27 November 1951 (age 74) Kolkata, West Bengal
- Party: Communist Party of India (Marxist)
- Education: Asutosh College (B.Sc.); University of Calcutta (LL.B)
- Profession: Politician, Lawyer

Bikash Ranjan Bhattacharya (Bengali: বিকাশ রঞ্জন ভট্টাচার্য; born 27 November 1951) is an Indian politician and lawyer. He served as a Member of Parliament, Rajya Sabha from the Communist Party of India (Marxist). He served as the CPI(M) parliamentary party leader in Rajya Sabha from 3 July 2024 until 3 May 2025. He served as Mayor of Kolkata from 2005 to 2010, heading the Kolkata Municipal Corporation, led by the Left Front in the state of West Bengal.

== Early life ==
Bhattacharya hails from the Kalighat region of Kolkata. He was born into a Bengali Brahmin refugee family to Nityaranjan Bhattacharyya and Avarani Bhattacharyya. He went to Kalighat High School, and then joined Asutosh College for his Bachelor of Science degree. He completed his LL.B. from University of Calcutta. He was later recruited as a school teacher, however, he left that job to join the legal profession.

== Legal career ==
Bhattacharya is a Senior Advocate and leads various notable cases like "Saradha", "Narada sting operation", "Teachers Recruitment Scam" among other cases. He is practicing in Supreme Court of India, Calcutta High Court and other courts.

He has served as the Advocate General of Tripura for 5 years between 1998 and 2003. He was once offered the position of a justice at Calcutta High Court but he passed on that appointment.

He also acts as the principal legal mind of his party and defends party members implicated in political cases.

== Political career ==
Bhattacharya joined the Communist Party of India (Marxist) as a student and was active Students' Federation of India.

He was arrested in the 1970s for participating in students' movement and spent some time in prison.

He took over the reins of the Kolkata Municipal Corporation in 2005 and continued as Mayor of Kolkata in 2010. He was elected from Ward No. 100, Kolkata Municipal Corporation in 2005, defeating influential Trinamool Congress (TMC) leader Partha Chatterjee.

As Mayor of Kolkata, he undertook several projects, including sewerage systems in the city, and provided birth certificates to street children. He faced frequent opposition from the TMC government .

He fought from the Jadavpur Lok Sabha constituency in 2019 Indian general election in West Bengal for CPI(M) in which he faced defeat and received third position behind Mimi Chakraborty of Trinamool Congress party and Anupam Hazra of the Bharatiya Janata Party. He was the only of candidate of his party in West Bengal to retain his security deposit.

He had been elected to Rajya Sabha from West Bengal in 2020 and took oath on 22 July. Earlier in 2017, he contested for a Rajya Sabha seat in West Bengal, however, his nomination was disqualified due to technical issues.

He was elected as the President of All India Lawyers' Union, lawyers' organisation of Communist Party of India (Marxist) in 2017. He currently serves as a special invited member of CPI(M) West Bengal State Committee.

He served as the CPI(M) parliamentary party leader in Rajya Sabha.

He fought from the Jadavpur assembly constituency in 2026 West Bengal Assembly election in West Bengal for CPI(M) in which he faced defeat and received third position getting just 17.81 % behind Sarbori Mukherjee of BJP and Debabrata Majumdar of AITC.

== Personal life ==
Bhattacharyya married to Ibha Bhattacharyya on 31 May 1976 and the couple has a son. Ibha Bhattacharyya is a consultant dietician. He has five brothers and one sister. Bhattacharya, in spite of hailing from a Brahmin family, is an avowed atheist. In 2015, Bhattacharya generated news by publicly consuming beef in an event held in Dharmatala to protest the Dadri lynching incident.
