= Jyotirmay =

Jyotirmay is a masculine given name. Notable people with the name include:

- Jyotirmay Bhattacharya, Indian judge
- Jyotirmay Singh Mahato, Politician from West Bengal, India
