= Kalyan Mukherjee =

Kalyan Mukherjee may refer to:

- Kalyan Mukherjea, authority on Indian classical music
- Kalyan Mukherjee (politician)
