= Badaruddoza Khan =

Indian politician

Member of the Indian Parliament for Murshidabad
- In office 2014–2019
- Preceded by: Abdul Mannan Hossain
- Succeeded by: Abu Taher Khan

Personal details
- Born: 8 April 1954 (age 72) Notun Kharibona village, Murshidabad, West Bengal, India
- Party: Communist Party of India (Marxist)
- Spouse: Sahanaj Begam
- Children: 1 son & 1 Daughter
- Education: Calcutta University -(B.Sc., B.Ed.)

Badaruddoza Khan is a member of the Communist Party of India (Marxist) and has won the 2014 Indian general elections from the Murshidabad (Lok Sabha constituency).

Badaruddoza Khan graduated in science from the University of Calcutta in 1976 and completed B.Ed. in 1979. He served Gudhia High School in Murshidabad district.

He was involved in politics from his younger days. He has been president of the West Bengal state committee of All Bengal Teachers Association (ABTA) since 2012. He was a member of the West Bengal Board of Secondary Education during 2007–2012.

In 2014 general election he contested and won from the Murshidabad constituency with a slim margin of 18,453 votes. He contested again from Murshidabad for CPI(M) in the 2019 Indian general election but lost to TMC's Abu Taher, receiving only 11.63% votes, hence losing his security deposit.
