= Nagmoti =

1983 film by Gautam Chattopadhyay

- Bengali: নাগমতী
- Directed by: Gautam Chattopadhyay
- Screenplay by: Gautam Chattopadhyay
- Produced by: Sibaprasad Sen
- Starring: Atanu Roy; Joy Banerjee; Sreela Majumdar
- Cinematography: Vivek Banerjee
- Edited by: Bulu Ghosh
- Music by: Gautam Chattopadhyay
- Production company: Shubhalakshmi Production
- Release date: 1983
- Running time: 115 mins
- Country: India
- Language: Bengali

Nagmoti is a 1983 Indian Bengali film directed by Gautam Chattopadhyay and produced by Sibaprasad Sen, starring Atanu Roy, Joy Banerjee and Sreela Majumdar in the lead roles. The screenplay and the musical score were also written by Gautam Chattopadhyay. The cinematographer of the film was Vivek Banerjee. The Director of audiography was Durga Das Mitra. The editor of the film was Bulu Ghosh.

The film won the Silver Lotus Award (Rajat Kamal) for the Best Bengali Film of 1982 at the 30th National Film Awards in 1983 for "its absorbing portrayal of an ethnic group".

The story of Nagmoti focuses on a floating nomadic community of snake-worshipping gypsies known as "Bede" in the Ganges river delta, southeast of Kolkata, of the densely riverine southern Bengal. They strongly believe that their divine mission is to spread the glory of their deity, the Goddess Bishahari, the snake goddess.

== Plot ==
Mahabbat, the bonded labourer of the landlord, runs into Shankini, the young Bede girl who feels quite suffocated in her own community. Love inspires them to seek a new, stable and natural home. The matriarchal Bede community is ruled under the severe vigilance of Asmani. She is critical of everyone outside their community. Shankini and Mahabbat plan to flee from their respective prisons. In the process of executing their plan they become the victims of contradictions. Shankini is exorcised due to he actions. After having submitted to the ritual as a tactical move on her part, she resumes her struggle for freedom with a renewed zeal. They are chased by both the communities. In a separate incident, Zulfikar, a speechless Bede kills Asmani and runs away with the youngest girl of the Bede community. Finally the deliverance is brought by the snake goddess Bishahari.

== Cast ==
The main cast consists of:

- Joy Banerjee
- Sreela Majumdar
- Atanu Roy
- Alpana Gupta
- Gita Karmakar
- Gopa Sengupta
- Ananda Mukhopadhyay
- Jharina

== Soundtrack ==
All music is written and composed by Gautam Chattopadhyay.

Track listing

No.	Title	Singer(s)	Length
1.	"Doriyay Ailo Tufan"	Paban Das Baul	3:37

== Present state ==
Only a rare and delicate 35 mm print of Nagmoti is available now. It is available to Bishu Chattopadhyay, brother of Gautam Chattopadhyay and founder-member of Moheener Ghoraguli, who currently lives in San Francisco.
