= Nandini Mukherjee =

Indian computer science academic

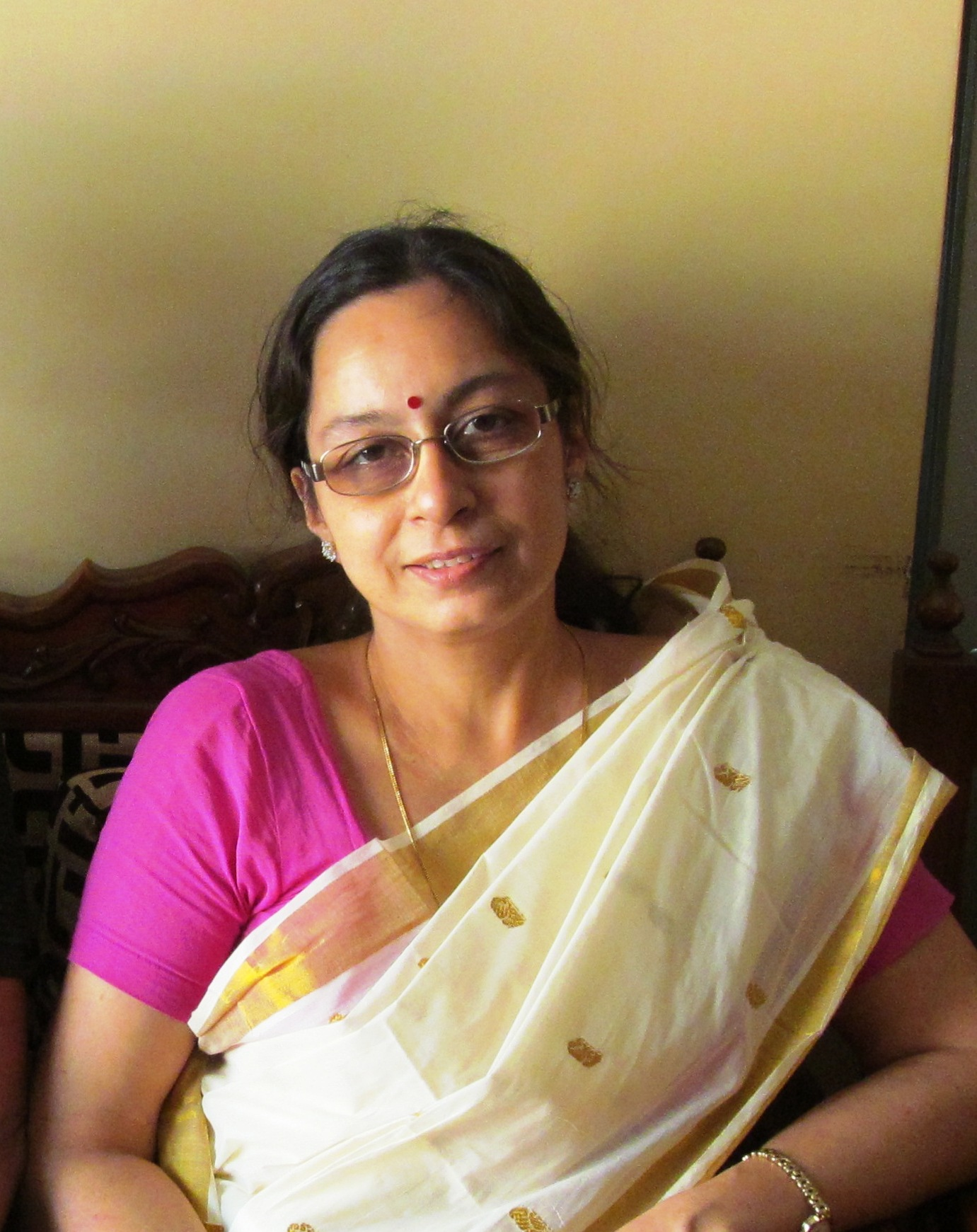
- Born: Nandini Mukhopadhyay
- Education: Kamala Girls' High School; Patha Bhavan, Kolkata
- Alma mater: IIEST, Shibpur (B.Eng.); Jadavpur University (M.Eng.); University of Manchester (Ph.D.)
- Political party: Communist Party of India (Marxist)
- Scientific career
- Fields: Internet of Things; Wireless Sensor Networks; Cloud Computing; High performance parallel computing
- Workplaces: Jadavpur University
- Thesis: On the effectiveness of feedback-guided parallelisation (1999)
- Doctoral advisor: John Gurd

Nandini Mukherjee (née Mukhopadhyay) is an Indian computer scientist and politician. She is a professor of department of computer science and engineering of Jadavpur University, Kolkata, India.

== Education ==
Mukherjee took her Madhyamik examination from Kamala Girls' High School. She studied for her higher secondary examinations from Patha Bhavan, Kolkata. She earned her Bachelor of Engineering degree from the department of computer science and technology of Bengal Engineering College under Calcutta University, Shibpur in 1987. She get a job at ORG Systems Private Ltd Kolkata as a system engineer. She earned her Master of Engineering degree from the department of computer science and engineering, Jadavpur University, in 1991. In 1996 she was awarded the prestigious Commonwealth scholarship for her PhD from the school of computer science at the University of Manchester, in the UK, finishing in 1999.

She has a PhD from the University of Manchester. Her areas of research were in the fields of parallel computing, grid computing and wireless sensor networks (WSN).

== Teaching career ==
After graduating in 1987 with a BE in computer science and engineering from Bengal Engineering College, Shibpur she joined ORG systems private ltd as a graduate engineer trainee. Mukherjee began teaching in the computer science and engineering department at Jadavpur University in 1992. As of 2016 she was the director of the university's school of mobile computing.

In 2001 she went to Newcastle University to research high-performance computing.

By May 2024, she had published over 250 research papers.

She supervised research projects funded by different agencies of the Government of India. Mukherjee leads a collaborative research project to investigate the application of mobile computing and wireless sensor networks to Indian rural health systems.

== Political career ==
Mukherjee was involved with the Students' Federation of India in her college days. Later on she associated with the movement for self-reliance in science and technology through the Forum of Scientists, Engineers and Technologists (FOSET) and the Vigyan Mancha.

She is secretary of the West Bengal Free Software Mancha (FSMWB). She is active in the All India Democratic Women's Association, and is a state secretariat member of the All India Peace and Solidarity Organisation (AIPSO). In 2011 she contested the by-elections from Bhawanipore Assembly constituency.

Mukherjee is joint secretary of the Jadavpur University Teachers' Association (JUTA) and an active member of the West Bengal College and University Teachers' Association (WBCUTA). She was an elected teacher's representative in the executive council of Jadavpur University. Mukherjee is involved in the All India Democratic Women's Association (AIDWA). She is a state secretariat member of the All India Peace and Solidarity Organisation (AIPSO).

She was the Left Front CPI(M) candidate in the Bhawanipore by-elections in 2011. She contested in the Lok Sabha election of 2014 from the South Kolkata Constituency as the Left Front Nominated CPI(M) candidate. She again ran unsuccessfully in the Lok Sabha election of 2019 from the Kolkata Dakshin constituency and received 1,40,275 votes.
