= Ram Chandra Dome =

Indian politician (born 1959)

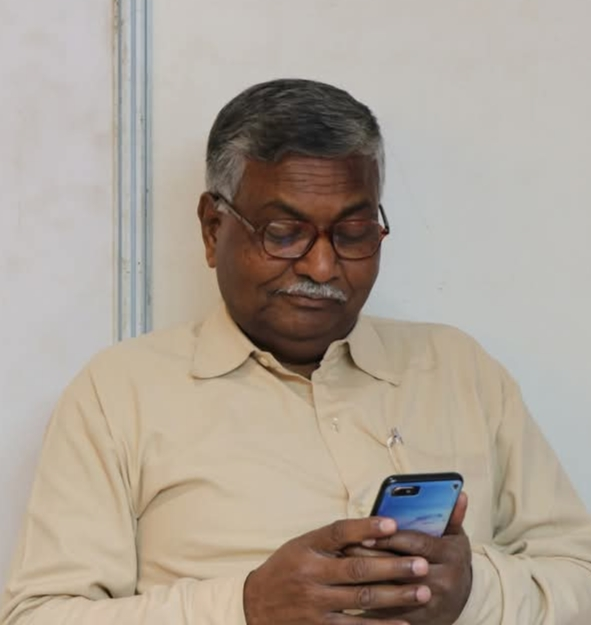

Member of the Polit Bureau of the Communist Party of India (Marxist)
- Incumbent
- Assumed office 10 April 2022
- Preceded by: Biman Bose

Member of Parliament, Lok Sabha
- In office 2009-2014
- Preceded by: Somnath Chatterjee
- Succeeded by: Anupam Hazra
- Constituency: Bolpur
- In office 1989-2009
- Preceded by: Gadadhar Saha
- Succeeded by: Satabdi Roy
- Constituency: Birbhum

Chief Whip, Lok Sabha, CPI(M)
- In office 2009-2014
- Preceded by: Santasri Chatterjee
- Succeeded by: Jitendra Choudhury

General Secretary, Dalit Shoshan Mukti Mancha
- Incumbent
- Assumed office 2018
- Preceded by: Position established

Personal details
- Born: 8 February 1959 (age 67) Chilla village, Birbhum district, West Bengal, India
- Party: CPI(M)
- Spouse: Bandana Dome (Das)
- Children: 1 daughter
- As of 24 Dec, 2022

Ram Chandra Dome (born 8 February 1959, Chilla village) is an Indian politician and a Politburo member of the Communist Party of India (Marxist). A doctor by profession, he was elected to the Lok Sabha for seven consecutive terms. He is the first member from the scheduled castes to be inducted in the Politburo of the CPI(M). He has also been serving as the national general secretary of Dalit Shoshan Mukti Mancha, CPI(M)'s frontal organisation for backward castes, since 2018.

== Early political life ==
Dome's engagement with people's movements began when he joined SFI in the 1970s. He later participated in the youth movement and became central committee member of DYFI. He also took part in peasant movements and joined CPI (M) as a whole-timer in 1977.

Along with his hectic political work, Dome makes sure he takes out time to continue charitable medical practice for the needy and the weaker sections of the society.

He was elected to the Lok Sabha from Birbhum constituency in West Bengal for the first time in 1989.

== Political career ==
He continued to represent Birbhum constituency in 1991, 1996, 1998, 1999 and 2004. In 2009, he was elected to the Lok Sabha from Bolpur constituency.

Dome has been a member of parliamentary committee for Ministry of Health and Family Welfare during 1990–1991. He also served as a member of parliamentary committee for Ministry of Human Resource Development from 1991 to 2004.

During 1996–1997, he was a member of the estimates committee and committee on MP Local Area Development Scheme (MPLAD) from 2006 to 2008.

He was a member of Lok Sabha from 1989 to 2009 and was associated with the ministry of Health and Family Welfare.

He was the Chief Whip of Communist Party of India (Marxist) in the Lok Sabha from 2009 to 2014. He also served as a member of parliamentary committee for railways from 2009 to 2014.

He has also been the Chairman of Sriniketan Santiniketan Development Authority in Bolpur, West Bengal. He also served as member of the court of Viswa-Bharati University and the governing body of Indian Council of Medical Research.

Dome has been elected to the state committee and was elected as district secretary of the CPI(M) Birbhum district committee in 2012. He was elected to the central committee and the West Bengal state secretariat in 2015.

Dome was elected as the national general secretary of Dalit Shoshan Mukti Mancha, CPI(M)'s frontal organisation for backward castes, in 2018. He was re-elected in 2022.

He was included in the Politburo in 2022 and is the first member belonging to the scheduled castes on the top decision*-making body on CPI(M).

He contested from Bolpur constituency in 2014 and 2019 and lost. He was also defeated from the Suri Assembly Constituency in 2016 West Bengal Legislative Assembly election.

During 2018 Panchayat elections he was attacked by the Trinamool Congress and was left bloodied and injured while leading a procession with candidates for filing nomination at Nalhati BDO office in Birbhum.

== Personal life ==
Dome has been married to Bandana Dome née Das since 1987. The couple has one daughter. They currently reside in Suri, Birbhum.
