= Sunil Kumar Mondal =

Indian politician

Member of Parliament, Lok Sabha
- In office 2014–2024
- Preceded by: Anup Kumar Saha
- Constituency: Bardhaman Purba

Member of West Bengal Legislative Assembly
- In office 2011–2014
- Preceded by: Mehbub Mondal
- Succeeded by: Sital Kartabya
- Constituency: Galsi

Personal details
- Born: 16 May 1958 (age 68) Rameshwarpur, West Bengal
- Party: All India Trinamool Congress (2014-2024); All India Forward bloc (1985-2014)
- Spouse: Kajali Mondal
- Children: 2 [Dr. Soumitra Mondal, Souvik Mondal]
- Education: University of Burdwan -(B.A., B.Ed)
- Profession: Teacher

Sunil Kumar Mondal is an Indian politician and was a member of parliament to the 16th Lok Sabha from Bardhaman Purba (Lok Sabha constituency), West Bengal. He won the 2014 Indian general election being an All India Trinamool Congress candidate.

While still a Forward bloc MLA from Galsi (Vidhan Sabha constituency) he had voted for the Trinamool Congress candidate during the Rajya Sabha election in February 2014. Subsequently, he joined the Trinamool Congress.
