= John Barla =

Indian politician

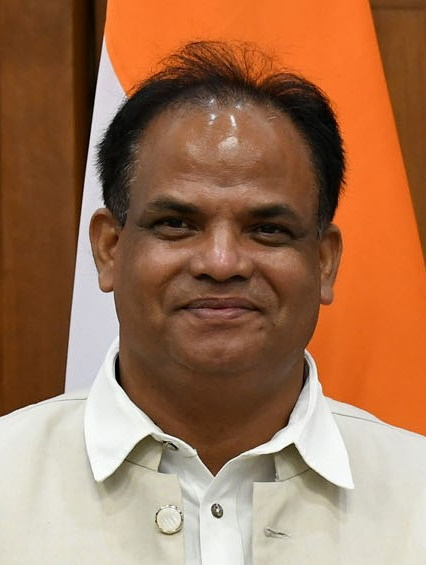

Minister of State for Minority Affairs
- In office 8 July 2021 – 11 June 2024
- Prime Minister: Narendra Modi
- Minister: Smriti Irani
- Preceded by: Kiren Rijiju

Member of Parliament, Lok Sabha
- In office 23 May 2019 – 4 June 2024
- Preceded by: Dasrath Tirkey
- Succeeded by: Manoj Tigga
- Constituency: Alipurduars

Personal details
- Born: 8 August 1975 (age 50) Lakhipara, West Bengal, India
- Party: Trinamool Congress (2025–present); Bharatiya Janata Party (2014–2025)
- Spouse: Late Mahima Barla
- Occupation: Politician, garden Worker
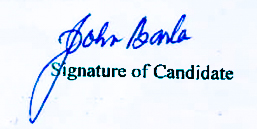
- Signature

John Barla is an Indian politician. He was elected to the Lok Sabha, lower house of the Parliament of India from Alipurduars, West Bengal in the 2019 Indian general election as a member of the Bharatiya Janata Party. From 7 July 2021 to 11 June 2024, he served as the Union Minister of State in the Ministry of Minority Affairs.

== Political career ==
He used to work in the tea gardens of Alipurduar district at the age of 14. After that, he started to raise the voice for the welfare of the tea workers. In May 2019, in the 2019 Lok Sabha election, he defeated Dasrath Tirkey of Trinamool Congress by more than 2 lakh votes from Alipurduar. On 8 July 2021, he was made the Minister of State for Minority Affairs during the cabinet reshuffle in the Narendra Modi cabinet. In 2022 he was arrested after he breached the elections code of conduct. In June 2024 he was replaced and his predecessor Kiren took over as successor. He joined Trinamool Congress on 15 May 2025 in the presence of West Bengal Pradesh President Subrata Bakshi, Central Treasurer of AITC and Minister Aroop Biswas and State Vice President Jayaprakash Mazumder.
