= Aparupa Poddar =

Indian politician (born 1986)

Aparupa Poddar Afrin Ali

Member of Parliament, Lok Sabha
- In office 16 May 2014 – 4 June 2024
- Preceded by: Sakti Mohan Malik
- Succeeded by: Mitali Bag
- Constituency: Arambagh

Personal details
- Born: Aparupa Poddar; 8 January 1986 (age 40) Serampore, West Bengal, India
- Party: All India Trinamool Congress
- Spouse: Mohd. Shakir Ali
- Children: 3
- Education: Hooghly Mohsin College The University of Burdwan (M.A.) Dr. B.R. Ambedkar Open University, Hyderabad (LL.B) (LL.M)

Afrin Ali née Aparupa Poddar (born 8 January 1986) is an Indian politician and a member of parliament to the 16th 17th Lok Sabha from Arambagh (Lok Sabha constituency), West Bengal. She won the 2014 & 2019 Indian general election as an All India Trinamool Congress candidate.

== Controversies ==
The allegations relating to the first controversy, regarding financial corruption, were confirmed to be true on 5 October 2017, when she confessed that she had taken a bribe from Narada News boss Mathew Samuel as part of Narada sting operation.

The allegations regarding the second controversy are regarding her religion. Born into a Hindu family and named Aparupa Poddar at birth, she married a Muslim man. She then stood for election from a parliamentary constituency which is reserved for those belonging to the scheduled castes. The Bharatiya Janata Party lodged a complaint with the Election Commission seeking cancellation of her candidature on the plea that she had converted to Islam and hence she did not belong to a scheduled caste. Aparupa Poddar then claimed, that she had changed her name but not her religion.

On 30 June 2026, her husband Shakir Ali was arrested by National Investigative Agency from Rishra residence.
