= Khalilur Rahaman =

Member of the 17th Lok Sabha

Member of Parliament, Lok Sabha
- Incumbent
- Assumed office 24 May 2019
- Preceded by: Abhijit Mukherjee
- Constituency: Jangipur

Personal details
- Born: September 1, 1960 (age 66) Shamshergunj Suti Dhulian, West Bengal, India
- Party: Nationalist Citizens Party of India (2026–present)
- Other political affiliations: Trinamool Congress (2019–2026)

Khalilur Rahaman (born 1 September 1960) is an Indian politician and managing director of Nur Bidi Works Pvt. Ltd. and leader of Nationalist Citizens Party of India.

== Career ==
He contested the Parliamentary Election in India 2019 from Jangipur Loksabha. He was elected to the Lok Sabha, lower house of the Parliament of India from Jangipur, West Bengal in the 2019 & 2024 Indian general election as a member of the TMC party.
