= Sukanta Majumdar =

Indian politician and botanist (born 1979)

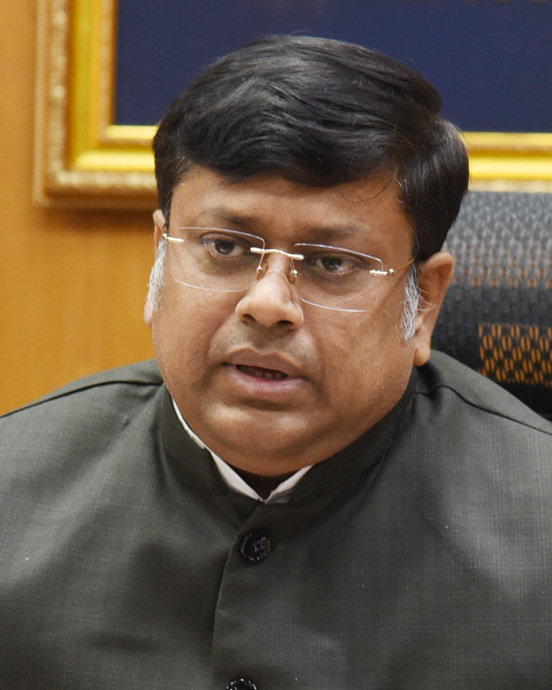
- Majumdar in 2026

Union Minister of State for Education
- Incumbent
- Assumed office 10 June 2024 Serving with Jayant Chaudhary
- Minister: Dharmendra Pradhan; Pralhad Joshi (additional charge)
- Preceded by: Subhash Sarkar

3rd Union Minister of State for Development of North Eastern Region
- Incumbent
- Assumed office 10 June 2024
- Minister: Jyotiraditya Scindia
- Preceded by: B.L. Verma

10th State President of Bharatiya Janata Party, West Bengal
- In office 21 September 2021 – 2 July 2025
- National President: J. P. Nadda
- Preceded by: Dilip Ghosh
- Succeeded by: Samik Bhattacharya

Member of Parliament, Lok Sabha
- Incumbent
- Assumed office 19 June 2019
- Preceded by: Arpita Ghosh
- Constituency: Balurghat, West Bengal
- Majority: 10,386

Personal details
- Born: 29 December 1979 (age 46) Balurghat, West Bengal, India
- Party: Bharatiya Janata Party
- Spouse: Koyel Chowdhury (m. 2008)
- Children: 2
- Education: M.Sc., B.Ed., Ph.D. (Botany)
- Alma mater: University of North Bengal
- Occupation: Politician
- Profession: Teacher
- As of May, 2019

Sukanta Majumdar (born 29 December 1979) is an Indian politician. He was elected to the Lok Sabha, lower house of the parliament of India from Balurghat, West Bengal in the 2024 Indian general election. He served the 10th state president of Bharatiya Janata Party, West Bengal. From 20 September 2021 to July 2025, he served as the president of the Bharatiya Janata Party in West Bengal.

== Early life and education ==
Majumdar was born on 30 December 1979 at Balurghat, Dakshin Dinajpur, West Bengal. He completed his schooling at Khadimpur High School in Balurghat. He pursued higher education at the University of North Bengal, where he obtained a Ph.D. in Botany. His academic background includes an M.Sc. and B.Ed. degree. He has published more than 15 scientific papers in national and international journals.

== Political career ==
Majumdar is a member of the Bharatiya Janata Party (BJP). He was elected as the Member of Parliament for the Balurghat constituency in the 2019 general elections, defeating the Trinamool Congress candidate Arpita Ghosh by a margin of over 33,000 votes. In September 2021 he succeeded Dilip Ghosh as the President of the BJP's West Bengal unit. In June 2024, he was appointed as the Union Minister of State for Education and the Union Minister of State for the Development of North Eastern Region in the Third Modi ministry.

== Personal life ==
Majumdar is married to Koyel Chowdhury, and they have two daughters. His father, Sushanta Kumar Majumdar, was a government employee, and his mother, Nibedita Majumdar, was a primary school teacher.

== See also ==
- Bharatiya Janata Party
- Balurghat Lok Sabha constituency
- Third Modi ministry
- Education in India
- Northeast India
