= Abu Taher Khan =

Indian politician

Member of Parliament, Lok Sabha
- Incumbent
- Assumed office 24 May 2019
- Preceded by: Badaruddoza Khan
- Constituency: Murshidabad

Member of the West Bengal Legislative Assembly
- In office 13 May 2001 – 23 May 2019
- Preceded by: Jayanta Kumar Biswas
- Succeeded by: Sahina Mumtaz Begum
- Constituency: Naoda

Personal details
- Born: 23 November 1964 (age 61) Naoda, West Bengal, India
- Party: Nationalist Citizens Party of India (2026–present)
- Other political affiliations: Trinamool Congress (2019–2026); Indian National Congress (1992–2019)

Abu Taher Khan (born 23 November 1964) is an Indian politician, agriculturalist and social worker from Murshidabad. He was former Legislator and is the current Member of Parliament from the Murshidabad representing the Nationalist Citizens Party of India.

== Early life and education ==
Khan was born in 1963 to Bengali Muslim parents in Naoda, Murshidabad district. His father was Barkatullah Khan and his mother was Sabijan Bewa. In 1980, he passed his 8th/Madhyamik under the West Bengal Board of Secondary Education from Hareknagar MMCVP in Beldanga. Khan married Tanuja Khanum, and has two sons. The family also have a home in New Delhi, the country's capital. He is one of prominent leaders of Murshidabad, West Bengal.

== Career ==
Khan's political career began when he ran as an Indian National Congress candidate for the Naoda (Vidhan Sabha constituency) during the 2001 West Bengal Legislative Assembly elections. Khan kept this seat for 18 years, as he was able to win the elections of 2006, 2011 and 2016.

In 2019, Khan gave up his seat at the West Bengal Legislative Assembly to contest the 2019 Indian general election for the entire Murshidabad as an All India Trinamool Congress candidate. He successfully won the seat, defeating Abu Hena by 226417 votes, and officially became a Member of the Indian Parliament.

== Political career ==
He contested the 2024 Lok Sabha election from the Trinamool Congress from 11No. Murshidabad Lok Sabha constituency and won to became first time Member of Parliament.

=== 2026 Rebellion ===
In June 2026, almost immediately after the massive Trinamool Congress defeat, around 20 MPs of TMC allegedly declared rebellion from their Party, and presented their written wish to join Bhartiya Janata Party. This group was led by Kakoli Ghosh.

Later, on 14 June 20 MPs, including Khan, signed a formal letter declaring their split from Trinamool Congress as to merge with the Nationalist Citizen Party of India (NCPI). They formally submitted the letter to Lok Sabha Speaker Om Birla.

The total strength of TMC in Lok Sabha had been 28, so that a number of 20 MPS made it eligible for splitting from the Party, as per the Indian Defection laws, so as to escape the anti-defection disqualification.
