= Subhas Sarkar =

Indian Doctor and politician

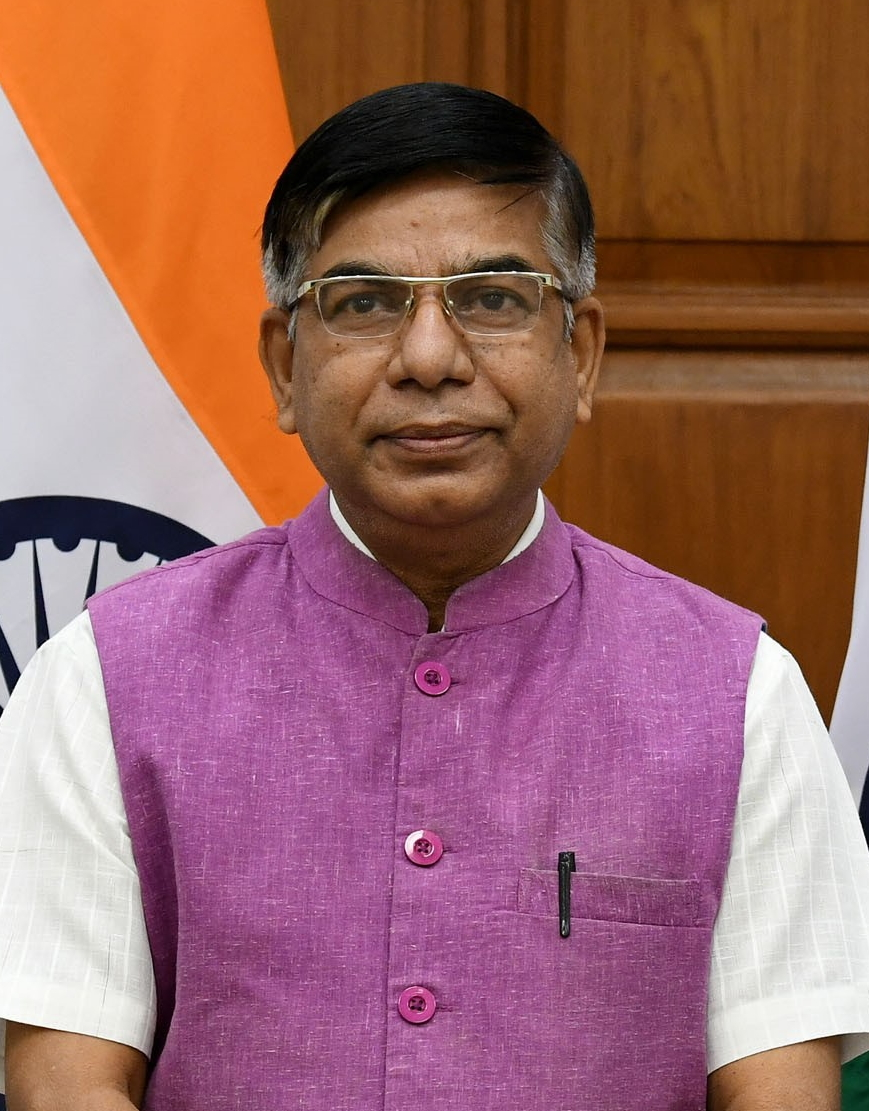
- Sarkar in 2021

Union Minister of State for Education, Government of India
- In office 8 July 2021 – 11 June 2024
- Prime Minister: Narendra Modi
- Minister: Dharmendra Pradhan
- Preceded by: Sanjay Dhotre
- Succeeded by: Sukanta Majumdar

Member of Parliament, Lok Sabha
- In office 23 May 2019 – 4 June 2024
- Preceded by: Moonmoon Sen
- Succeeded by: Arup Chakraborty
- Constituency: Bankura, West Bengal

Personal details
- Born: 25 November 1953 (age 72) Bankura, West Bengal, India
- Citizenship: India
- Party: Bharatiya Janata Party
- Spouse: Chandana Sarkar
- Education: University of Calcutta
- Occupation: Politician
- Profession: Doctor
- Known for: Vice President of BJP West Bengal
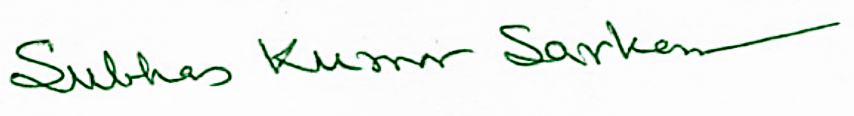
- Signature
- Website: On Twitter

Subhas Sarkar (born 25 November 1953) is an Indian gynecologist and politician. He was elected to the Lok Sabha, lower house of the Parliament of India from Bankura, West Bengal in the 2019 Indian general election as a member of the Bharatiya Janata Party. He served the constituency from 2019 to 2024. He has already served as the Union Minister of State in the Ministry of Education (India) in the Second Modi ministry.

== Political career ==
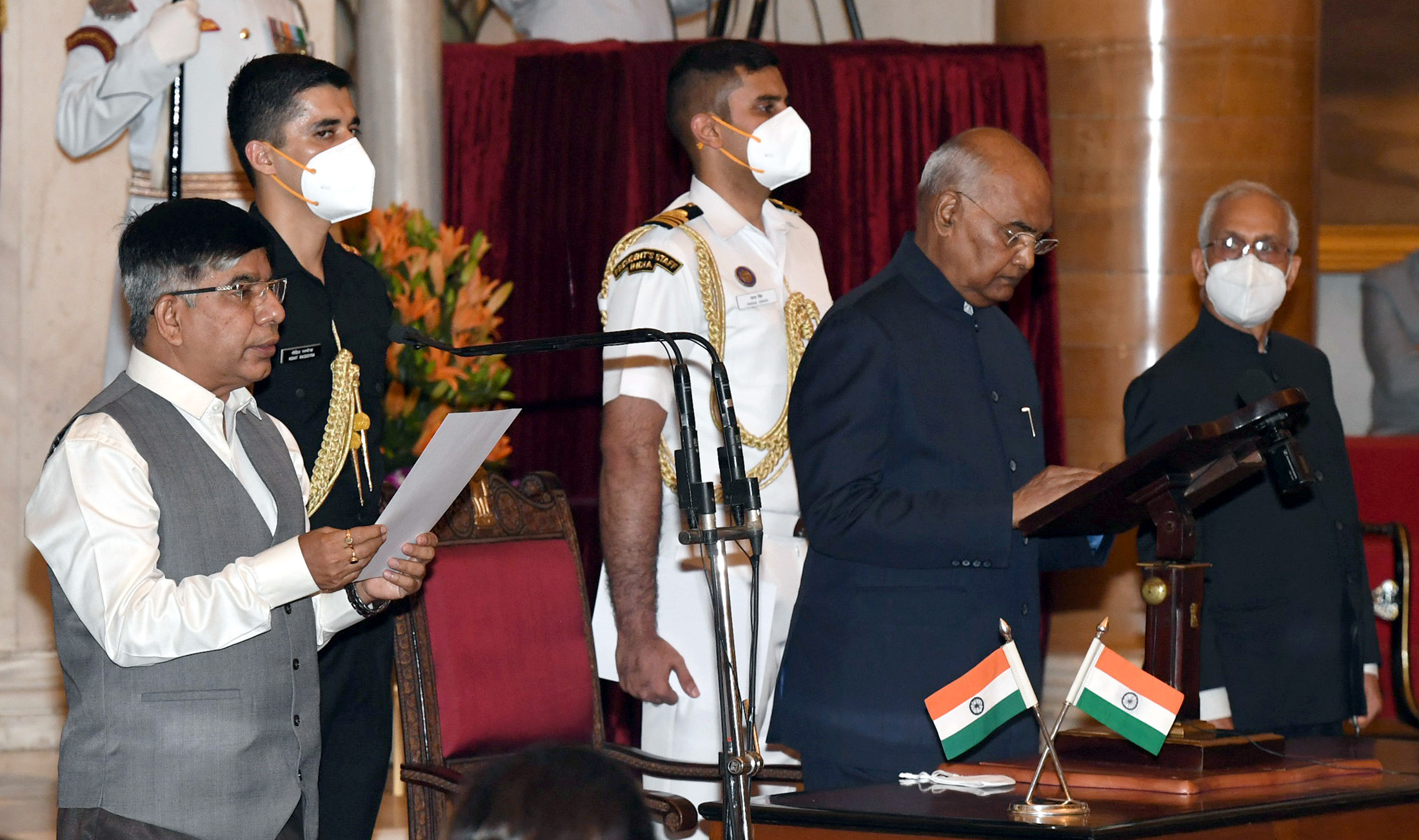
The President, Shri Ram Nath Kovind administering the oath as Minister of State to Subhas Sarkar, at a Swearing-in Ceremony, at Rashtrapati Bhavan, in New Delhi on July 7, 2021.

He contested from Bankura as Bharatiya Janata Party candidate in 2019 Indian general election and defeated a veteran politician and Bengal Minister Subrata Mukherjee of All India Trinamool Congress by over 1 lakh votes. On 8 July 2021, he was made the Minister of State for Education during the cabinet reshuffle in the Narendra Modi cabinet.
