= Dasrath Tirkey =

Indian politician

Member of Parliament, Lok Sabha
- In office 2014–2019
- Preceded by: Manohar Tirkey
- Succeeded by: John Barla
- Constituency: Alipurduars

Personal details
- Born: 9 February 1967 (age 59)
- Party: Bharatiya Janata Party (2020–present)
- Other political affiliations: Trinamool Congress (2014–2019); Revolutionary Socialist Party (India) (till 2014)
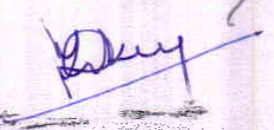
- Signature

Dasrath Tirkey is an Indian politician. He was a member of the All India Trinamool Congress and won the 2014 Indian general elections from the Alipurduars (Lok Sabha constituency). In 2019, he lost the election.

Three Left Front MLAs, Dasarath Tirkey and Ananta Deb Adhikari of RSP(I) and Sunil Mandal of All India Forward Bloc joined TMC in February 2014. He joined Bhartiya Janata Party in 2020.

While in RSP, Dasrath Tirkey was MLA for three consecutive terms in 2001, 2006 and 2011 elections, from Kumargram assembly seat. He was elected M.P. before he completed his last term as MLA.
