= Mriganko Mahato =

Indian politician

Dr. Mriganko Mahato

Member of the India Parliament for Purulia
- In office 16 May 2014 – 23 May 2019
- Preceded by: Narahari Mahato
- Succeeded by: Jyotirmoy Singh Mahato

Personal details
- Born: 12 January 1963 (age 63) Purulia, West Bengal
- Party: Trinamool Congress
- Spouse: Aparajita Mahato
- Children: 2
- Education: Kolkata Medical College
- Alma mater: Calcutta University
- Profession: Medical Practitioner

Dr. Mriganko Mahato is a member of the All India Trinamool Congress and has won the 2014 Indian general elections from the Purulia (Lok Sabha constituency).

An Ophthalmologist by profession he was associated with Purulia District Hospital. He was a student of Ramkrishna Mission Schools at Purulia and Narendrapur.
