= Bijoy Chandra Barman =

Indian politician

Chairman of Rogi Kalyan Samiti, Jalpaiguri Sadar Hospital
- Incumbent
- Assumed office 20 September 2021

Chairman of Siliguri Jalpaiguri Development Authority
- In office 3 June 2019 – 18 August 2021
- Preceded by: Sourav Chakraborty
- Succeeded by: Sourav Chakraborty

Member of Parliament, Lok Sabha
- In office 2014–2019
- Preceded by: Mahendra Kumar Roy
- Succeeded by: Jayanta Kumar Roy
- Constituency: Jalpaiguri

Personal details
- Born: 1 May 1957 (age 69)
- Party: All India Trinamool Congress
- Education: Jalpaiguri Law College, University of North Bengal
- Profession: Politician

Bijoy Chandra Barman is an Indian politician who served as Chairman of Siliguri Jalpaiguri Development Authority and a former member of parliament to the 16th Lok Sabha from Jalpaiguri (Lok Sabha constituency), West Bengal. He won the 2014 Indian general election being an All India Trinamool Congress candidate.
