= Saman Pathak =

Indian politician

Member of Parliament, Rajya Sabha
- In office 2006–2012
- Constituency: West Bengal

Saman Pathak, a politician from Communist Party of India (Marxist), is a Member of the Parliament of India representing West Bengal in the Rajya Sabha, the upper house of the Indian Parliament.
