= Joy Banerjee =

Indian actor and politician (1963–2025)

- Born: 23 May 1963; Kolkata, West Bengal, India
- Died: 25 August 2025 (aged 62); Kolkata, West Bengal, India
- Occupations: Actor; Politician
- Years active: 1982–2021
- Notable work: Nagmoti (1983); Chopper (1987)
- Political party: Bharatiya Janata Party
- Spouse: Ananya Banerjee

Joy Banerjee (23 May 1963 – 25 August 2025) was an Indian actor and politician. As an actor he is known for his work in Bengali cinema. He made his debut as an actor opposite Debashree Roy in Aparupa (1982) directed by Bidesh Sarkar. He was critically applauded for his role in Chopper (1986) directed by Nabyendu Chatterjee.

== Early life ==
Banerjee was born on 23 May 1963. His father Satyaranjan Banerjee was an Indian police officer. His mother was Manju Banerjee. Her paternal grandfather Naliniranjan Banerjee was a civil engineer.

== Career ==
Banerjee made his acting debut opposite Debashree Roy in Aparupa (1982) directed by Bidesh Sarkar. He was critically applauded for his role in Chopper (1987) directed by Nabyendu Chatterjee. He featured in Sukhen Das' Milan Tithi. He appeared in Hirak Jayanti (1990) which was a major box office success. He contested the 2014 Lok Sabha elections from Birbhum, West Bengal on BJP ticket against TMC sitting MP and Tollywood actress Satabdi Roy. He also contested the 2019 Lok Sabha Election from Uluberia as BJP candidate against TMC sitting MP Sajda Ahmed. In November 2021, the actor officially declared that he would not represent BJP anymore.

Joy Banerjee was admitted to a private hospital in Kolkata on 15 August 2025 after experiencing acute respiratory problems. He was diagnosed with Chronic Obstructive Pulmonary Disease (COPD) and placed on ventilator support as his condition worsened. He died on 25 August 2025, in Kolkata, at approximately 11:35 a.m., at the age of 62 (though some media outlets reported 63). He is survived by his wife and mother.

== Comments on Chinese products ==
Banerjee urged people in June 2020 to abandon Chinese products and threatened that all those who fail to do so "should be beaten up and their homes ransacked." He also said, "A lesson should be taught to China. And this should start with a boycott of Chinese goods. We're all supposed to boycott everything that is Chinese. Those who still use it should abstain from doing so. Otherwise, their legs should be broken and their home should be ransacked instantly".
