= Abhijit Mukherjee =

Indian politician (born 1960)

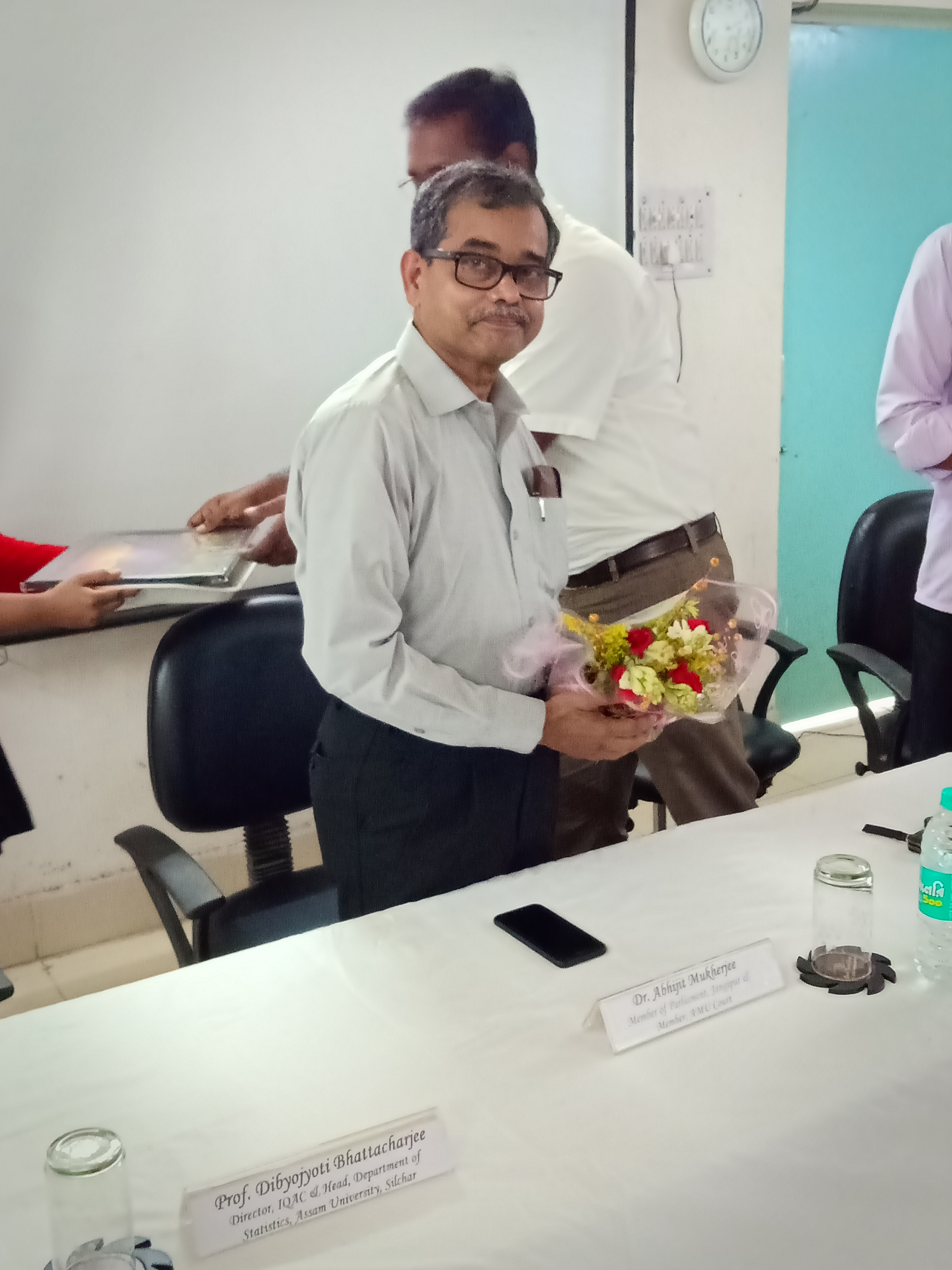
- Mukherjee in 2020

Member of Parliament, Lok Sabha
- In office 13 October 2012 – 23 May 2019
- Preceded by: Pranab Mukherjee
- Succeeded by: Khalilur Rahaman
- Constituency: Jangipur, West Bengal

Member of West Bengal Legislative Assembly
- In office 13 May 2011 – 18 October 2012
- Preceded by: Dipak Chatterjee
- Succeeded by: Dipak Chatterjee
- Constituency: Nalhati

Personal details
- Born: 2 January 1960 (age 66) Hooghly, West Bengal, India
- Party: Indian National Congress (since 2025; 2011–2021)
- Other political affiliations: All India Trinamool Congress (2021–2025)
- Spouse: Chitralekha Mukherjee (m. 1984)
- Children: 2
- Parents: Pranab Mukherjee; Suvra Mukherjee
- Education: Jadavpur University (B.E)
- Occupation: Chartered engineer; social worker; politician
- Website: http://www.abhijitmukherjee.in

Abhijit Mukherjee (born 2 January 1960) is an Indian politician who served as Member of Parliament (MP) from the Jangipur Lok Sabha constituency in the Indian state of West Bengal.

Mukherjee won the 2012 Jangipur Lok Sabha constituency by-election by 2,536 votes defeating his nearest CPI(M) rival Muzaffar Hussain after a tough fight. The seat was vacated by his father President Pranab Mukherjee after he was elected as the President.

Mukherjee was re elected to Lok Sabha from Jangipur in 2014. He lost the 2019 election to TMC candidate Khalilur Rahaman.

== Early years ==
Abhijit Mukherjee was born on 2 January 1960 in Hoogly in West Bengal. He is the son of late Pranab Mukherjee (the former President of India) and late Suvra Mukherjee. His grandfather, Kamada Kinkar Mukherjee, was active in the Indian independence movement and was a member of West Bengal Legislative Council between 1952 and 1964 as a representative of the Indian National Congress. Mukherjee graduated with a B.E. in Mechanical Engineering from the Jadavpur University in 1984.

== Professional career ==
Mukherjee has worked as a corporate executive for firms like the Bharat Heavy Electricals Limited, Maruti Udyog Limited and the Steel Authority of India Limited. He was General Manager in charge of Corporate Social Responsibility [CSR] in the Steel Authority of India Limited.

== Political career ==
Mukherjee began his political career as a state legislator in 2011. Following his father's election to the presidency, he contested the by-election for the Jangipur Seat in the Lok Sabha and won. He was re-elected in the 2014 Indian general election in a four cornered contest and retained his seat in Jangipur Constituency of Dist : Murshidabad, West Bengal. He was one of the four Members of Parliament in the Lok Sabha from West Bengal in 2014 of the Indian National Congress. In the 2019 General elections to the Lok Sabha, he lost to his rival candidate from TMC.

On 5 July 2021, he joined Trinamool Congress after resigning from Indian National Congress. He rejoined INC in February 2025.

== Controversy ==
In 2012, Mukherjee was criticized for describing the women participants of the anti-rape protests as "highly dented and painted". He later withdrew and apologised for his statements.
