= Sakti Mohan Malik =

Indian politician

Sakti Mohan Malik Teacher

Member of the Indian Parliament for Arambagh
- In office 2009–2014
- Preceded by: Anil Basu
- Succeeded by: Aparupa Poddar (Afrin Ali)

Personal details
- Born: 3 June 1959 (age 67). Chandibati, Hooghly, West Bengal.
- Citizenship: India
- Party: Communist Party of India (Marxist).
- Spouse: Mrs. Pabitra Malik
- Children: 1 son & 1 daughter.
- Parent(s): Mr. Kunjabehari Malik (father), Mrs. Kattayani Malik (mother)
- Education: University of Burdwan.
- Profession: Teacher, politician.
- Committees: Member of several committees

Sakti Mohan Malik is an Indian Politician and was Member of Parliament of the 15th Lok Sabha of India. He represented the Arambagh constituency of West Bengal and is a member of the Communist Party of India (Marxist) political party. Do not confuse Sakti Mohan Malik with J. Mohan Malik, a professor at Asia-Pacific Center for Security Studies, USA.

== Early life and education ==
Sakti Malik was born in Chandibati, Hooghly, (West Bengal). Malik was educated in University of Burdwan and attained BEd & MA degrees from the university. After completing his education, he became a teacher.

== Political career ==
Sakti Malik was a first time MP. He succeeded Anil Basu from his own party who was elected seven straight terms to Lok Sabha (8th to 14th) from the same constituency.

== Posts held ==
| # | From | To | Position |
|---|---|---|---|
| 01 | 2009 | 2014 | Member, 15th Lok Sabha |
| 02 | 2009 | 2014 | Member, Committee on Commerce |
| 03 | 2010 | 2014 | Member, Committee on Urban Development |

== See also ==
- 15th Lok Sabha
- Politics of India
- Parliament of India
- Government of India
- Communist Party of India (Marxist)
- Arambagh (Lok Sabha constituency)
