= Jayanta Kumar Roy =

Indian politician

Member of Parliament, Lok Sabha
- Incumbent
- Assumed office 23 May 2019
- Preceded by: Bijoy Chandra Barman
- Constituency: Jalpaiguri

Personal details
- Born: 3 February 1968 (age 58) Lataguri, West Bengal, India
- Party: Bharatiya Janata Party
- Spouse: Debjani Roy (m. 1992)
- Children: 2
- Parent(s): Hemendra Narayan Roy, Jaya Roy

Jayanta Kumar Roy (born 3 February 1968) is an Indian politician. He has been elected to the Lok Sabha, lower house of the Parliament of India from Jalpaiguri, West Bengal in the 2019 Indian general election and 2024 Indian general election as a member of the Bharatiya Janata Party.

== Personal life ==
Roy was born to Hemendra Narayan Roy and Jaya Roy on 3 February 1968 in Lataguri in Jalpaiguri district of West Bengal. A qualified physician, Roy did MBBS and MD from North Bengal Medical College. He married Debjani Roy on 22 January 1992, with whom he has a son and a daughter.
