= Kamala Girls' High School =

Location
- P-512, Kavi Bharati Sarani, Lake Rd; Ballygunge, Kolkata, West Bengal, 700029; India; 22.5148044°N 88.3578825°E

Information
- Established: 1932
- Gender: Girl
- Language: Bengali, English

Kamala Girls' High School is a girls' school situated in Southern Avenue, Vivekananda Park, South Kolkata, West Bengal, India, affiliated to the West Bengal Board of Secondary Education for Madhyamik Pariksha (10th Board exams), and to the West Bengal Council of Higher Secondary Education for Higher Secondary Examination (12th Board exams). The founder of the school is Mrs. Kamala Basu in 1932. It is a government-sponsored school, aided by West Bengal Government.

== Notable alumni ==
- Indrani Dutta, actress
- Tanusree Chakraborty, actress

== See also ==
- Education in India
- List of schools in India
- Education in West Bengal
- List of schools in West Bengal
