= Jyotirmay Singh Mahato =

Politician from West Bengal, India

- জোতির্ময় সিং মাহাতো

Member of Parliament, Lok Sabha
- Incumbent
- Assumed office 23 May 2019
- Preceded by: Mriganko Mahato
- Constituency: Purulia

Personal details
- Born: 2 May 1985 (age 41) Patradih,Jhalda Purulia, West Bengal, India
- Party: Bharatiya Janata Party
- Education: LL.B.
- Alma mater: Rourkela Law College; Sambalpur University
- Profession: Agriculturist
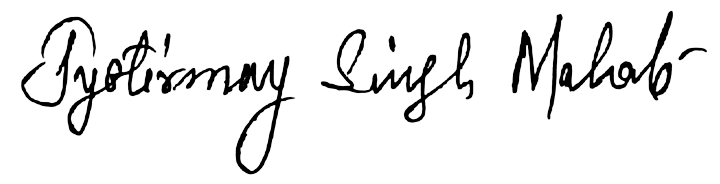
- Signature
- Parliamentary committee memberships: 13 September 2019 - incumbent : Standing Committee on Personnel, Public Grievances, Law and Justice; 9 October 2019 - incumbent : Committee on Subordinate Legislation; 9 October 2019 - incumbent : Consultative Committee, Ministry of Youth Affairs and Sports; 2024 - Standing Committee on Home Affairs

Jyotirmay Singh Mahato is an Indian politician. He was elected to the Lok Sabha, lower house of the Parliament of India from Purulia, West Bengal in 2019 & 2024 as a member of the Bharatiya Janata Party. His village name is Patradih in Purulia District. He is also serving as one of the State General Secretary of West Bengal unit of BJP from June 2020.
