= Kalyan Mukherjee (politician) =

Indian politician

Kalyan Mukherjee (Bengali: কল্যাণ মুখার্জি) was the deputy mayor of Kolkata Municipal Corporation (KMC) in the city of Kolkata, West Bengal, India. He was elected as a councillor from a ward in the North Kolkata. He is a member of the Revolutionary Socialist Party which is a part of the Left Front. As Deputy Mayor, Kalyan Mukherjee maintains the portfolio of Water Supply in Ships, Agency & Stores, Mayor in Council.
