= Anupam Hazra =

Indian politician

Member of Parliament, Lok Sabha
- In office 2014–2019
- Preceded by: Ram Chandra Dome
- Succeeded by: Asit Kumar Mal
- Constituency: Bolpur

National Secretary of Bharatiya Janata Party
- Incumbent
- Assumed office 2020

Personal details
- Born: 30 May 1982 (age 44)
- Party: Bharatiya Janata Party (2019–present)
- Other political affiliations: Trinamool Congress (before 2019)
- Education: Assam University (doctorate)
- Profession: Teacher

Anupam Hazra (born 30 May 1982) is currently serving as National Secretary of the Bharatiya Janata Party (BJP) since 2020. He is a former Member of Parliament, Lok Sabha of Trinamool Congress from Bolpur Lok Sabha constituency, West Bengal.

Hazra is a social work (MSW) educator, author, researcher and a development professional from Bolpur-Santiniketan, West Bengal, India. He completed his doctoral research on rural sanitation management (Swachh Bharat) and qualified for the National Eligibility Test for consecutively four times and awarded a junior research fellowship by the University Grants Commission, Government of India.

So far, he has authored four books and contributed over 100 research articles to different international and national social science journals across the globe. His books on different developmental issues are still among the best-sellers.

== Family background ==
Hazra was born on 30 May 1982, in a lower middle-class scheduled caste rural Bengali family in West Bengal. He is the first child of Shri. Debnath Hazra and Smt. Manju Hazra. He grew up in the rich cultural environment of Santiniketan and completed his education at Rabindranath Tagore's Visva Bharati University. His father is currently a retired government employee, and his mother is a homemaker. His younger brother is currently teaching at a University based out of West Bengal.

== Political career ==
=== Member of Parliament (2014-2019) ===
Hailing from a non-political and academic family, Hazra started his political career as a Member of Parliament from the Bolpur Lok Sabha constituency in West Bengal in 2014, by defeating the then-prominent CPI(M) leader Ram Chandra Dome with a whopping margin of over 2.5 Lakh votes. During his tenure, he has been a member of the Standing Committee on Information & Technology (IT) as well as a member of the Consultative Committee of the Ministry of Steel & Mining. Additionally, Hazra was also in the forum for promoting sanitation and was an advisor to the Indian Council of Food & Agriculture.

As a Member of Parliament, Hazra led several parliamentary delegations to foreign countries like Australia, the United Kingdom (UK), Germany, South Korea, Israel, Palestine, Jordan, Cambodia, Bangladesh and some more countries as well.

In March 2018, he represented India as an ambassador for peace with a team of parliamentarians and politicians at the Universal Peace Summit organised by the Universal Peace Federation in Seoul, South Korea.

=== National Secretary of Bharatiya Janata Party (BJP) ===
In 2020, Hazra was appointed as the National Secretary (Rashtriya Mantri) of the Bharatiya Janata Party (BJP). He has been the co-in-charge (Saha-Prabhari) of the Bihar BJP from 2020 to 2022.

In 2023, the national president of the Bharatiya Janata Party, Shri Jagat Prakash Nadda inducted him into his core team as the national secretary (Rashtriya Mantri) of the party for the second consecutive time.

== Books ==
- Sustaining Development in North-East India | Book Link
- India's Social Sector and Millennium Development Goals: Issues, Challenges and Policy Measures | Book Link
- Human Development and Disparities: Issues and Concerns for Northeast India | Book Link
- Rural India And The Emerging Developmental Challenges | Book Link

== Articles/Research papers ==
1. Hazra, A (2009) 'Tackling The Global Threat of Climate Change', Journal of Social Welfare; Vol. 56, No. 3 ISSN 0037-8038
2. Hazra, A (2009) 'Displacements: An Emerging Global Concern', Kurukshetra, A Journal of Rural Development Vol. 57, No. 8 ISSN 0023-5660
3. Hazra, A (2009) 'Food for All - Still a Distant Dream' Kurukshetra, A Journal of Rural Development Vol. 57, No. 11 ISSN 0023-5660
4. Hazra, A (2009) 'Educational Status of Women in India', Journal of Social Welfare Vol. 56, No. 6 ISSN 0037-8038
5. Hazra, A (2009) 'Gender Disparity in Education' Yojana, Ministry of Information and Broadcasting Vol. 53 ISSN 0971-8400
6. Hazra, A (2009) 'The Ignored Indians' Man and Development Vol. 32, No, 3 ISSN 0258-0438
7. Hazra, A (2009) 'Corruption and Development: Exploring The Dynamics' Social Action Vol. 59, No. 4 ISSN 0037-7627
8. Hazra, A (2010) 'State of Health in India The Current Scenario' Kurukshetra, A Journal of Rural Development Vol. 58, No. 4. ISSN 0023-5660
9. Hazra, A (2010) 'Development at the cost of Human life?' Social Action Vol. 60, No. 2 ISSN 0037-7627
10. JOURNAL ON Social ECONOMICS Consortium for Teaching, Research, Learning and Development, USA Spring 2010 An Analysis of Scarcity in a State of Surplus Page 37 ISBN 0-9703797-7-3
11. JOURNAL ON SOCIOLOGY Consortium for Teaching, Research, Learning and Development, USA Spring 2010, Gender Budgeting: The Emerging Framework For Raising Women Voices Page 99 ISBN 0-9703797-5-7
12. Hazra, A (2010) 'Migration: Still A Survival Strategy for Rural India' Kurukshetra, A Journal of Rural Development Vol. 59, No. 2 ISSN 0023-5660
13. Hazra, A (2013) 'Rural India and the Emerging Developmental Challenges', Mittal Publications, New Delhi ISBN 8183244661
14. Hazra, A (2014) 'Sustaining Development in North-East India: Emerging Issues, Challenges and Policy Measures', Concept Publishing Pvt. Ltd., New Delhi
