= 2004 Indian general election in West Bengal =

Indian political election in West Bengal

- 10 May 2004

All 42 West Bengal seats in the Lok Sabha
- Registered: 47,437,431
- Turnout: 77.7% (▲2.65 pp)
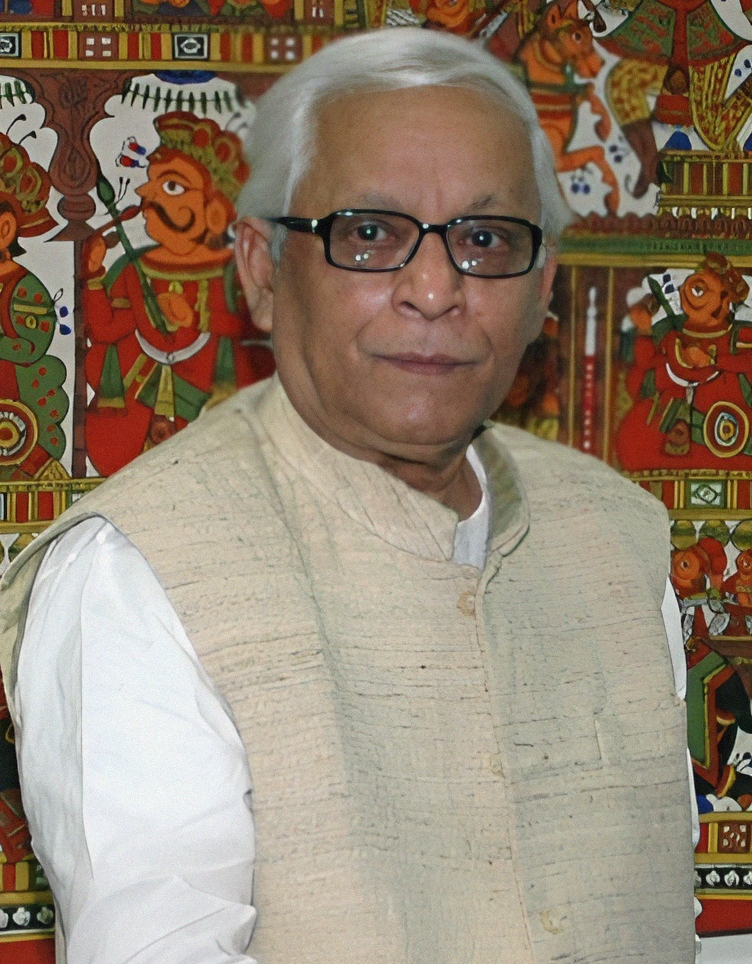

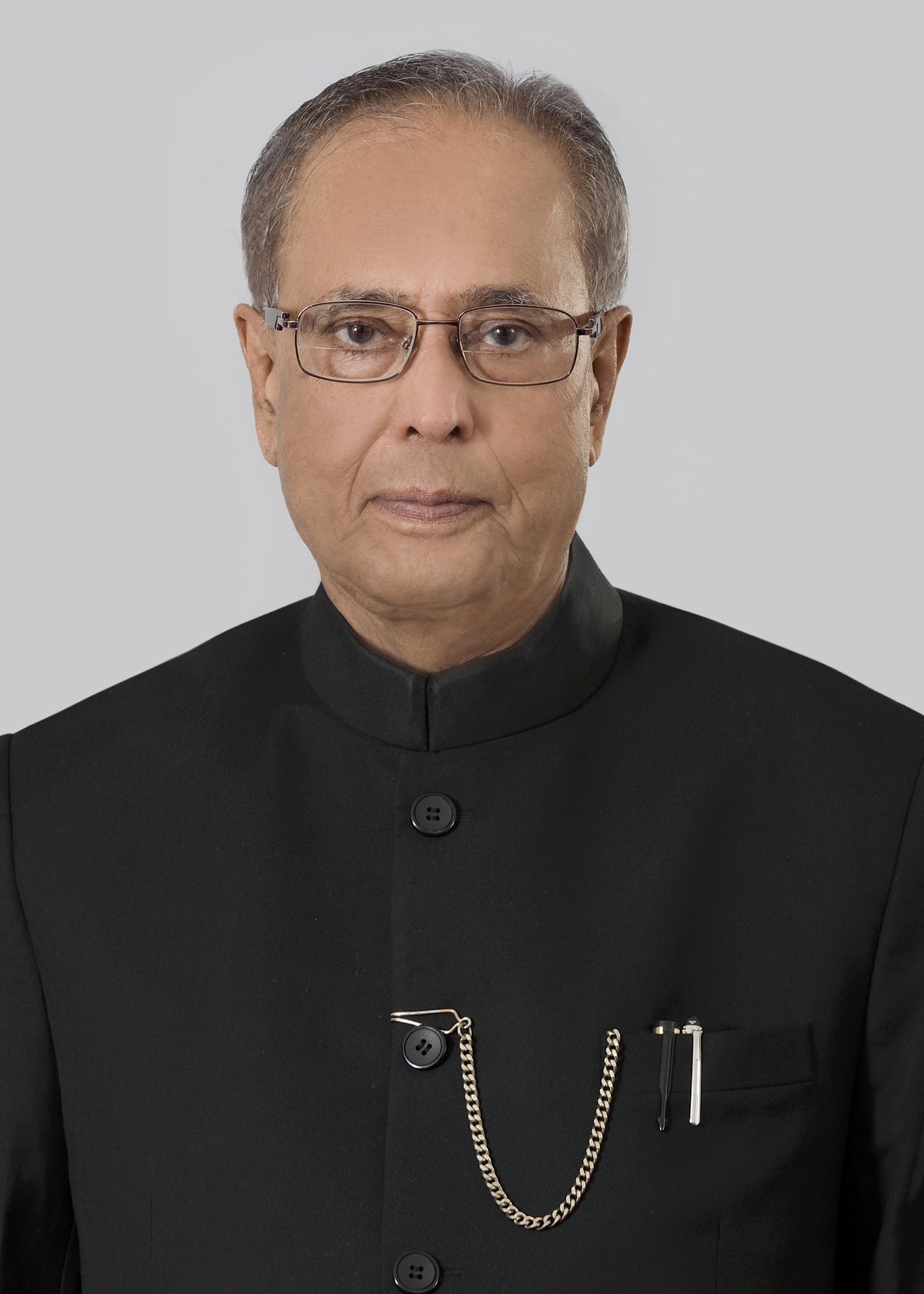

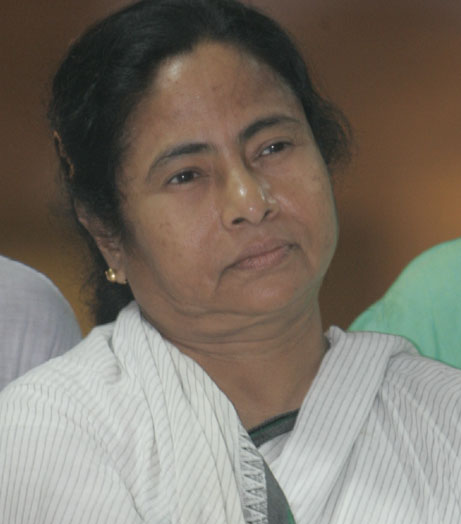
	First party	Second party	Third party
Leader	Buddhadeb Bhattacharjee	Pranab Mukherjee	Mamata Banerjee
Party	CPI(M)	INC	AITC
Alliance	LF	INC+ (post poll UPA)	NDA
Leader since	2000	2000	1998
Leader's seat	Did not contest	Jangipur	Kolkata South
Last election	35.57%, 21 seats	13.29%, 3 seats	26.04%, 8 seats
Seats won	26	6	1
Seat change	▲5	▲3	▼7
Popular vote	14,271,042	5,385,754	7,786,178
Percentage	38.57%	14.56%	21.04%
Swing	▲3.01 pp	▲1.27 pp	▼5.01 pp
Alliance seats	35	6	1
Prime minister before election
Atal Bihari Vajpayee
BJP
Prime minister after election
Manmohan Singh
INC

The 2004 Indian general election were held in Indian state West Bengal in 2004 to elect all 42 seats of Lok Sabha in the state. The election took place on 10 May 2004 and a turnout of 77.7% was recorded.

The Communist Party of India (Marxist) led Left Front had an overwhelming victory in the state by winning 35 seats. On the national level, Indian National Congress became the single largest party and formed the new government with its allies and taking external support from Left Front and other parties.

== Schedule ==
The election schedule was declared by Election Commission of India on 29 February 2004.

Poll event	Date
Notification date	16 April
Last date for filing nomination	23 April
Scrutiny of nomination	24 April
Last Date for withdrawal of nomination	26 April
Date of poll	10 May
Date of counting of votes	13 May

== Parties and alliances ==
Left Front

No.	Party	Flag	Symbol	Leader	Seats contested
1.	Communist Party of India (Marxist)			Buddhadeb Bhattacharjee	32
2.	Revolutionary Socialist Party			Manoj Bhattacharya	4
3.	All India Forward Bloc			Debabrata Biswas	3
4.	Communist Party of India			Swapan Banerjee	3

Other Left Front members that didn't fielded candidates in the election but supported the alliance were Biplobi Bangla Congress, Democratic Socialist Party, Marxist Forward Bloc, West Bengal Socialist Party, Revolutionary Communist Party of India and other left front parties.

United Progressive Alliance

No.	Party	Flag	Symbol	Leader	Seats contested
1.	Indian National Congress			Pranab Mukherjee	37
2.	Party of Democratic Socialism			Samir Putatundu	2
3.	Jharkhand Mukti Morcha			N/A	1
4.	Independent	—	—	N/A	2

Gorkha National Liberation Front supported the Congress candidate in Darjeeling constituency.

National Democratic Alliance

No.	Party	Flag	Symbol	Leader	Seats contested
1.	All India Trinamool Congress			Mamata Banerjee	29
2.	Bharatiya Janata Party			Tathagata Roy	13

== List of Candidates ==
Constituency		Left Front		NDA		UPA	
#	Name	Party	Candidate	Party	Candidate	Party	Candidate
1	Cooch Behar (SC)	AIFB	Hiten Barman	AITC	Girindra Nath Barman	INC	Sailen Barma
2	Alipurduars (ST)	RSP	Joachim Baxla	BJP	Manoj Tigga	INC	Ratan Lal Baraik
3	Jalpaiguri	CPM	Minati Sen	AITC	Parash Dutta	INC	Dipak Krishna Bhowmik
4	Darjeeling	CPM	Moni Thapa	BJP	Dr. G. S. Yonzone	INC	Dawa Narbula
5	Raiganj	CPM	Minati Ghosh	AITC	Zainal Abedin	INC	Priya Ranjan Dasmunsi
6	Balurghat (SC)	RSP	Ranen Barman	BJP	Manomohan Ray	INC	Dipti Barman
7	Malda	CPM	Pranab Das	BJP	Badsha Alam	INC	A. B. A. Ghani Khan
8	Jangipur	CPM	Abul Hasnat Khan	AITC	Mohammad Shish	INC	Pranab Mukherjee
9	Murshidabad	CPM	Moinul Hassan Ahamed	AITC	Mohammad Ali	INC	Abdul Mannan Hossain
10	Berhampore	RSP	Promothes Mukherjee	BJP	Tapas Kumar Chatterjee	INC	Adhir Ranjan Chowdhury
11	Krishnagar	CPM	Jyotirmoyee Sikdar	BJP	Satyabrata Mookherjee	INC	Asim Kumar Saha
12	Nabadwip (SC)	CPM	Alokesh Das	AITC	Nilima Nag (Mallick)	INC	Howladar Nripendra Nath
13	Barasat	AIFB	Subrata Bose	AITC	Ranjit Kumar Panja	INC	Prabir Banerjee
14	Basirhat	CPI	Ajay Chakraborty	AITC	Sujit Bose	INC	Syed Md. Nizamuddin
15	Joynagar (SC)	RSP	Sanat Kumar Mandal	BJP	Asit Baran Thakur	IND	Tarun Kanti Naskar
16	Mathurapur (SC)	CPM	Basudeb Barman	AITC	Radhika Pramanik	INC	Manoranjan Halder
17	Diamond Harbour	CPM	Samik Lahiri	AITC	Saugata Roy	INC	Daulat Ali Sheikh
18	Jadavpur	CPM	Sujan Chakraborty	AITC	Krishna Bose	INC	Prof. Omprakash Mishra
19	Barrackpore	CPM	Tarit Baran Topdar	AITC	Arjun Singh	INC	Debi Ghosal
20	Dum Dum	CPM	Amitava Nandy	BJP	Tapan Sikdar	INC	Tapas Majumder
21	Calcutta North West	CPM	Sudhangshu Seal	AITC	Subrata Mukherjee	IND	Sudip Bandyopadhyay
22	Calcutta North East	CPM	Md. Salim	AITC	Ajit Kumar Panja	INC	Moushumi Chatterjee
23	Calcutta South	CPM	Rabin Deb	AITC	Mamata Banerjee	INC	Nafisa Ali
24	Howrah	CPM	Swadesh Chakraborty	AITC	Bikram Sarkar	INC	Sultan Singh
25	Uluberia	CPM	Hannan Mollah	AITC	Rajib Banerjee	INC	Kazi Abdul Rajjak
26	Serampore	CPM	Santasri Chatterjee	AITC	Akbar Ali Khondkar	INC	Kesto Mukherjee
27	Hooghly	CPM	Rupchand Pal	AITC	Indrani Mukherjee	INC	Asok Kumar Das
28	Arambagh	CPM	Anil Basu	BJP	Swapan Kumar Nandi	INC	Datta Pradip
29	Panskura	CPI	Gurudas Dasgupta	AITC	Hema Choubey	INC	Nazim Ahmed
30	Tamluk	CPM	Lakshman Seth	AITC	Suvendu Adhikari	INC	Sudarsan Panja
31	Contai	CPM	Prasanta Pradhan	AITC	Nitish Sengupta	INC	Kshitindra Mohan Sahoo
32	Midnapore	CPI	Prabodh Panda	BJP	Rahul Sinha	INC	Narayan Chandra Paria
33	Jhargram (ST)	CPM	Rupchand Murmu	AITC	Nityananda Hembram	JMM	Mongal Soren
34	Purulia	AIFB	Bir Singh Mahato	AITC	Niyati Mahato	INC	Santiram Mahato
35	Bankura	CPM	Basudeb Acharia	AITC	Deb Prasad Kundu	PDS	Natabar Bagdi
36	Vishnupur (SC)	CPM	Susmita Bauri	AITC	Janardan Saha	INC	Achintya Majhi
37	Durgapur (SC)	CPM	Sunil Khan	BJP	Shib Narayan Saha	INC	Dhibar Shova
38	Asansol	CPM	Bikash Chowdhury	AITC	Moloy Ghatak	INC	Tapas Banerjee
39	Burdwan	CPM	Nikhilananda Sar	BJP	Anindya Gopal Mitra	INC	Champak Garai
40	Katwa	CPM	Mahboob Zahedi	AITC	Ahmed Sultan	PDS	Saifuddin Choudhury
41	Bolpur	CPM	Somnath Chatterjee	AITC	Dr. Nirmal Kumar Maji	INC	Dhananjoy Ghosh
42	Birbhum (SC)	CPM	Ram Chandra Dome	BJP	Arjun Saha	INC	Gopal Chandra Das

== Results ==
=== Results by Party/Alliance ===
Alliance/ Party		Popular vote			Seats		
Alliance/ Party		Votes	%	±pp	Contested	Won	+/−
LF	CPI(M)	1,42,71,042	38.57	▲3.00	32	26	▲5
LF	RSP	16,58,787	4.48	▲0.23	4	3	Steady
LF	CPI	14,84,152	4.01	▲0.54	3	3	Steady
LF	AIFB	13,52,423	3.66	▲0.21	3	3	▲1
LF	Total	1,87,66,404	50.72	▲3.98	42	35	▲6
NDA	AITC	77,86,178	21.04	▼5.00	29	1	▼7
NDA	BJP	29,83,950	8.06	▼3.07	13	0	▼2
NDA	Total	1,07,70,128	29.10	▼8.07	42	1	▼9
UPA	INC	53,85,754	14.56	▲1.27	37	6	▲3
UPA	PDS	81,999	0.22	Steady	2	0	Steady
UPA	JMM	56,429	0.15	▲0.09	1 + 1	0	Steady
UPA	IND	1,72,750	0.47	Steady	2	0	Steady
UPA	Total	56,96,932	15.40	Steady	42 + 1	6	Steady
Others		7,33,549	2.00	Steady	84	0	Steady
IND		10,33,220	2.79	▲0.90	144	0	Steady
Total		3,70,00,233	100%	-	355	42	-

=== Results by constituency ===
Constituency		Winner				Runner Up				Margin	%
#	Name	Candidate	Party	Votes	%	Candidate	Party	Votes	%	Margin	%
1	Cooch Behar (SC)	Hiten Barman	AIFB	490,982	51.54	Girindra Nath Barman	AITC	264,413	27.76	226,569	23.79
2	Alipurduars (ST)	Joachim Baxla	RSP	384,252	45.70	Manoj Tigga	BJP	239,128	28.44	145,124	17.26
3	Jalpaiguri	Minati Sen	CPM	424,163	47.65	Parash Dutta	AITC	243,558	27.36	180,605	20.29
4	Darjeeling	Dawa Narbula	INC	396,973	44.70	Moni Thapa	CPM	295,557	33.28	101,416	11.42
5	Raiganj	Priya Ranjan Dasmunsi	INC	421,904	45.98	Minati Ghosh	CPM	382,757	41.71	39,147	4.27
6	Balurghat (SC)	Ranen Barman	RSP	415,298	44.87	Manomohan Ray	BJP	344,152	37.18	71,146	7.69
7	Malda	A. B. A. Ghani Khan Ch.	INC	412,913	48.63	Pranab Das	CPM	301,805	35.54	111,108	13.09
8	Jangipur	Pranab Mukherjee	INC	431,647	48.88	Abul Hasnat Khan	CPM	394,787	44.70	36,860	4.17
9	Murshidabad	Abdul Mannan Hossain	INC	461,895	45.86	Moinul Hassan Ahamed	CPM	446,415	44.32	15,480	1.54
10	Berhampore	Adhir Ranjan Chowdhury	INC	508,095	51.24	Promothes Mukherjee	RSP	409,194	41.27	98,901	9.97
11	Krishnagar	Jyotirmoyee Sikdar	CPM	397,561	42.73	Satyabrata Mookherjee	BJP	377,174	40.54	20,387	2.19
12	Nabadwip (SC)	Alokesh Das	CPM	560,176	47.56	Nilima Nag (Mallick)	AITC	550,185	46.71	9,991	0.85
13	Barasat	Subrata Bose	AIFB	520,384	45.13	Ranjit Kumar Panja	AITC	508,224	44.07	12,160	1.05
14	Basirhat	Ajay Chakraborty	CPI	462,605	50.97	Sujit Bose	AITC	280,521	30.91	182,084	20.06
15	Joynagar (SC)	Sanat Kumar Mandal	RSP	450,043	55.81	Asit Baran Thakur	BJP	219,522	27.22	230,521	28.59
16	Mathurapur (SC)	Basudeb Barman	CPM	440,862	48.56	Radhika Ranjan Pramanik	AITC	358,834	39.53	82,028	9.04
17	Diamond Harbour	Samik Lahiri	CPM	430,890	51.51	Saugata Roy	AITC	277,106	33.13	153,784	18.38
18	Jadavpur	Sujan Chakraborty	CPM	505,396	49.44	Krishna Bose	AITC	415,728	40.67	89,668	8.77
19	Barrackpore	Tarit Baran Topdar	CPM	443,048	55.77	Arjun Singh	AITC	277,977	34.99	165,071	20.78
20	Dum Dum	Amitava Nandy	CPM	619,325	49.61	Tapan Sikdar	BJP	521,073	41.74	98,252	7.87
21	Calcutta North West	Sudhangshu Seal	CPM	151,772	42.15	Subrata Mukherjee	AITC	108,768	30.20	43,004	11.94
22	Calcutta North East	Md. Salim	CPM	284,427	50.00	Ajit Kumar Panja	AITC	210,647	37.03	73,780	12.97
23	Calcutta South	Mamata Banerjee	AITC	393,561	50.93	Rabin Deb	CPM	295,132	38.19	98,429	12.74
24	Howrah	Swadesh Chakrabortty	CPM	489,444	53.69	Dr. Bikram Sarkar	AITC	242,507	26.60	246,937	27.09
25	Uluberia	Hannan Mollah	CPM	424,749	49.88	Rajib Banerjee	AITC	272,634	32.02	152,115	17.86
26	Serampore	Santasri Chatterjee	CPM	404,082	42.70	Akbar Ali Khandoker	AITC	384,395	40.62	19,687	2.08
27	Hooghly	Rupchand Pal	CPM	496,890	53.72	Indrani Mukherjee	AITC	329,924	35.67	166,966	18.05
28	Arambagh	Anil Basu	CPM	744,464	77.16	Swapan Kumar Nandi	BJP	151,962	15.75	592,502	61.41
29	Panskura	Gurudas Dasgupta	CPI	541,513	61.92	Hema Choubey	AITC	262,035	29.96	279,478	31.96
30	Tamluk	Seth Lakshman Chandra	CPM	507,228	48.99	Adhikari Suvendu	AITC	449,848	43.45	57,380	5.54
31	Contai	Prasanta Pradhan	CPM	464,743	50.15	Nitish Sengupta	AITC	405,553	43.76	59,190	6.39
32	Midnapore	Prabodh Panda	CPI	480,034	52.84	Rahul (Biswajit) Sinha	BJP	319,274	35.14	160,760	17.70
33	Jhargram (ST)	Rupchand Murmu	CPM	509,045	64.01	Nityananda Hembram	AITC	157,702	19.83	351,343	44.18
34	Purulia	Bir Singh Mahato	AIFB	341,057	48.99	Shantiram Mahato	INC	195,339	28.06	145,718	20.93
35	Bankura	Acharia Basudeb	CPM	417,798	60.07	Deb Prasad Kundu (Tara)	AITC	187,469	26.96	230,329	33.12
36	Vishnupur (SC)	Susmita Bauri	CPM	518,507	64.28	Janardan Saha	AITC	186,678	23.14	331,829	41.14
37	Durgapur (SC)	Sunil Khan	CPM	505,250	59.61	Shib Narayan Saha	BJP	227,742	26.87	277,508	32.74
38	Asansol	Bikash Chowdhury	CPM	369,832	51.00	Ghatak Moloy	AITC	245,514	33.85	124,318	17.14
39	Burdwan	Nikhilananda Sar	CPM	673,091	67.51	Anindya Gopal Mitra	BJP	201,740	20.23	471,351	47.28
40	Katwa	Mahboob Zahedi	CPM	494,716	51.20	Ahmed Sultan	AITC	351,367	36.36	143,349	14.84
41	Bolpur	Chatterjee Somnath	CPM	504,836	65.56	Dr. Nirmal Kumar Maji	AITC	194,531	25.26	310,305	40.30
42	Birbhum (SC)	Ram Chandra Dome	CPM	372,294	51.42	Gopal Chandra Das	INC	180,682	24.95	191,612	26.46

== Bye-Elections Held ==
Constituency			Winner				Runner Up				Margin
No.	Name	Date	Candidate	Party	Votes	%	Candidate	Party	Votes	%	Margin
38	Asansol	5 September 2005	Bansa Gopal Chowdhury	CPI(M)	410,740	61.33	Moloy Ghatak	AITC	180,799	27.00	229,941
38	Asansol	5 September 2005	The Asansol Lok Sabha bypoll was held following the death of the incumbent MP, Bikash Chowdhury.								
40	Katwa	16 September 2006	Abu Ayesh Mondal	CPI(M)	541,496	60.32	Susanta Ghosh	AITC	356,162	39.68	185,334
40	Katwa	16 September 2006	The Katwa Lok Sabha bypoll was held following the death of the incumbent MP, Mahboob Zahedi.								
34	Purulia	October 2006	Narahari Mahato	AIFB	378,501	53.03	Shantiram Mahato	INC	291,468	40.84	87,033
34	Purulia	October 2006	The Purulia Lok Sabha bypoll was held following the resignation of the incumbent MP, Birsingh Mahato.								
7	Malda	October 2006	Abu Hasem Khan Choudhury	INC	437,161	50.67	Sailen Sarkar	CPI(M)	353,770	41.00	83,391
7	Malda	October 2006	The Malda Lok Sabha bypoll was held following the death of the incumbent MP.								

== Assembly Segment wise lead ==
Party	Assembly segments	Position in Assembly (as of 2006 election)
Communist Party of India (Marxist)	168	176
Indian National Congress	35	21
Trinamool Congress	28	30
Revolutionary Socialist Party	20	20
Communist Party of India	20	8
All India Forward Bloc	15	23
Bharatiya Janata Party	7	0
Others	1	16
Total	294	

== Post-election Union Council of Ministers from West Bengal ==
#	Name	Constituency	Designation	Department	From	To	Party
1	Pranab Mukherjee	Jangipur	Cabinet Minister	Ministry of Defence	23 May 2004	24 Oct 2006	INC
1	Pranab Mukherjee	Jangipur	Cabinet Minister	Ministry of External Affairs	24 Oct 2006	22 May 2009	INC
1	Pranab Mukherjee	Jangipur	Cabinet Minister	Ministry of Finance (Additional Charge)	24 Jan 2009	22 May 2009	INC
2	Priya Ranjan Dasmunsi	Raiganj	Cabinet Minister	Ministry of Water Resources	23 May 2004	18 Nov 2005	INC
2	Priya Ranjan Dasmunsi	Raiganj	Cabinet Minister	Ministry of Parliamentary Affairs	1 Nov 2005	6 Apr 2008	INC
2	Priya Ranjan Dasmunsi	Raiganj	Cabinet Minister	Ministry of Information & Broadcasting	18 Nov 2005	11 Nov 2008	INC
2	Priya Ranjan Dasmunsi	Raiganj	Cabinet Minister	Minister without portfolio	11 Nov 2008	22 May 2009	INC

== See also ==
- 2004 Indian general election
- 2001 West Bengal Legislative Assembly election
- 2006 West Bengal Legislative Assembly election
