= 2009 Indian general election in West Bengal =

- 30 April, 7 May and 13 May

All 42 West Bengal seats in the Lok Sabha
- Turnout: 81.42% (▲3.38 pp)
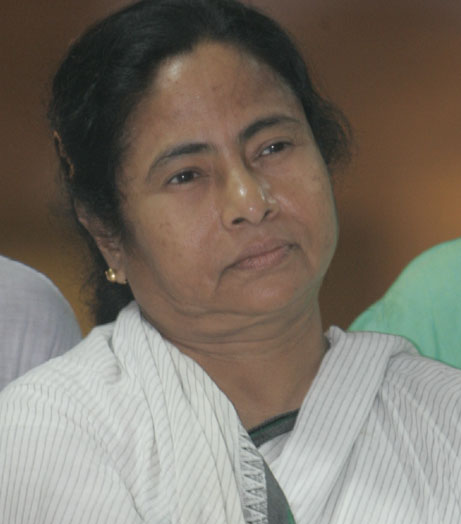

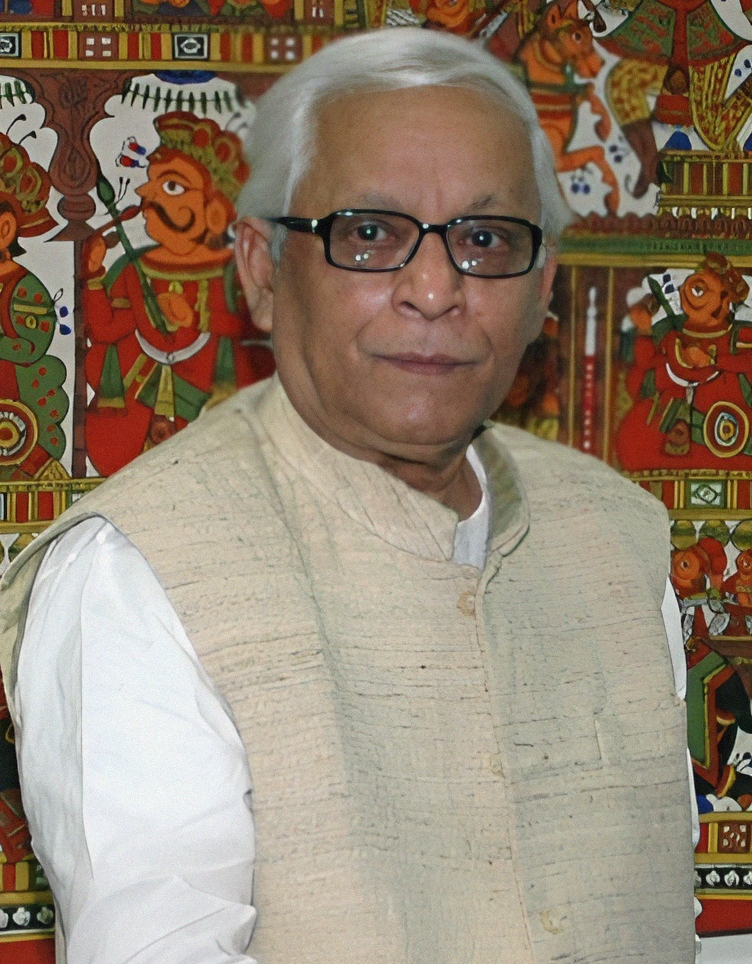

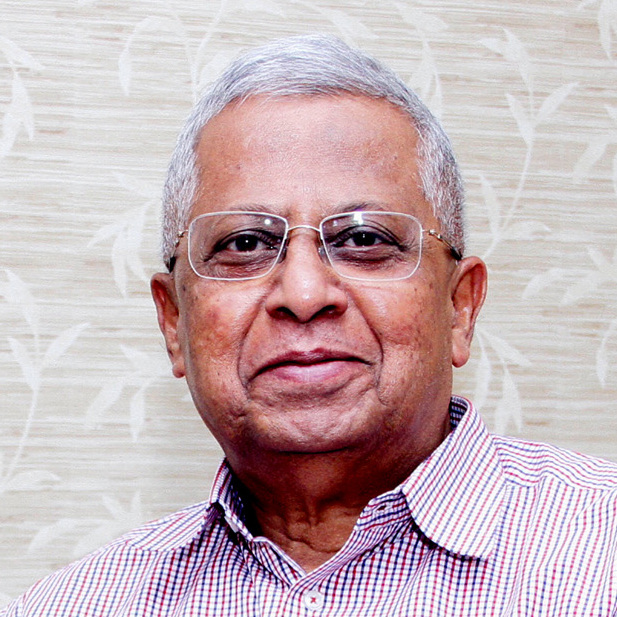
	First party	Second party	Third party
Leader	Mamata Banerjee	Buddhadeb Bhattacharya	Tathagata Roy
Party	AITC	CPI(M)	BJP
Alliance	UPA	TF	NDA
Leader since	1998	2000	2002
Leader's seat	Kolkata Dakshin	Did not contest	Kolkata Uttar (lost)
Last election	21.04%, 1 seat	41.81%, 40 seats	8.06%, 0 seat
Seats won	19	9	1
Seat change	▲18	▼17	▲1
Popular vote	13,321,553	14,144,667	3,513,121
Percentage	31.2%	33.1%	10.16%
Swing			▲2.1 pp
Alliance seats	26	15	1
- Seatwise Result Map of the 2009 general election in West Bengal

- Alliance wise Result of the 2009 general election in West Bengal
Prime Minister before election
Manmohan Singh
INC
Elected Prime Minister
Manmohan Singh
INC

The Indian general election, 2009 in West Bengal were held for 42 seats with the state going to polls in the last three phases of the general elections. There was pre-poll alliance in the state between the Indian National Congress and the Trinamool Congress against the Left Front. Indian National Congress contested on 14 seats across the state whereas the Trinamool Congress contested on 27 seats and SUCI(C) contested one seat. The alliance was largely successful as the Trinamool Congress, the Congress and the SUCI(C) won 19, 6 and 1 seat respectively, dislodging the Left Front, which won only 15 seats out of 42.

== Parties and alliances ==
Left Front
Party	Flag	Symbol	Leader	Seats
Communist Party of India (Marxist)			Biman Bose	32
Revolutionary Socialist Party			Manoj Bhattacharya	4
All India Forward Bloc			Debabrata Biswas	3
Communist Party of India			Swapan Banerjee	3
Total				42

United Progressive Alliance
Party	Flag	Symbol	Leader	Seats
Trinamool Congress			Mamata Banerjee	27
Indian National Congress			Pranab Mukherjee	14
Socialist Unity Centre of India (Communist)			Nihar Mukherjee	1
Total				42

National Democratic Alliance
Party	Flag	Symbol	Leader	Seats
Bharatiya Janata Party			Tathagata Roy	42

== Candidate List ==
Constituency		UPA		Left Front		NDA	
#	Name	Party	Candidate	Party	Candidate	Party	Candidate
1	Cooch Behar (SC)	AITC	Arghya Roy Pradhan	AIFB	Nripendra Nath Roy	BJP	Bhabendra Nath Barman
2	Alipurduars (ST)	AITC	Paban Kumar Lakra	RSP	Manohar Tirkey	BJP	Manoj Tigga
3	Jalpaiguri (SC)	INC	Sukhbilas Barma	CPM	Mahendra Kumar Roy	BJP	Dwipendra Nath Pramanik
4	Darjeeling	INC	Dawa Narbula	CPM	Jibesh Sarkar	BJP	Jaswant Singh
5	Raiganj	INC	Deepa Dasmunsi	CPM	Bireswar Lahiri	BJP	Gopesh Chandra Sarkar
6	Balurghat	AITC	Biplab Mitra	RSP	Prasanta Majumdar	BJP	Subhash Chandra Barman
7	Maldaha Uttar	INC	Mausam Noor	CPM	Sailen Sarkar	BJP	Amlan Bhaduri
8	Maldaha Dakshin	INC	Abu Hasem Khan	CPM	Abdur Razzaque	BJP	Dipak Kumar Chowdhury
9	Jangipur	INC	Pranab Mukherjee	CPM	Mriganka Bhattacharya	BJP	Debashish Majumdar
10	Baharampur	INC	Adhir Chowdhury	RSP	Promothes Mukherjee	BJP	Bidyut Kumar Halder
11	Murshidabad	INC	Abdul Mannan Hossain	CPM	Anisur Rahman	BJP	Nirmal Kumar Saha
12	Krishnanagar	AITC	Tapas Paul	CPM	Jyotirmoyee Sikdar	BJP	Satyabrata Mookherjee
13	Ranaghat (SC)	AITC	Sucharu Ranjan Haldar	CPM	Basudeb Barman	BJP	Sukalyan Ray
14	Bangaon (SC)	AITC	Gobinda Naskar	CPM	Dr. Asim Bala	BJP	Krishnapada Majumder
15	Barrackpur	AITC	Dinesh Trivedi	CPM	Tarit Baran Topdar	BJP	Prabhakar Tewari
16	Dum Dum	AITC	Sougata Roy	CPM	Amitava Nandy	BJP	Tapan Sikdar
17	Barasat	AITC	Kakoli Ghosh Dastidar	AIFB	Sudin Chattopadhyay	BJP	Bratin Sengupta
18	Basirhat	AITC	Haji Nurul Islam	CPI	Ajay Chakraborty	BJP	Swapan Kumar Das
19	Jaynagar (SC)	IND	Tarun Mandal (Note: SUCI(C) candidate contested as Independent)	RSP	Nimai Barman	BJP	Nirode Chandra Halder
20	Mathurapur (SC)	AITC	Ch. Mohan Jatua	CPM	Animesh Naskar	BJP	Binay Kumar Biswas
21	Diamond Harbour	AITC	Somen Mitra	CPM	Samik Lahiri	BJP	Abhijit Das (Bobby)
22	Jadavpur	AITC	Kabir Suman	CPM	Dr. Sujan Chakraborty	BJP	Sanat Bhattacharya
23	Kolkata Dakshin	AITC	Mamata Banerjee	CPM	Rabin Deb	BJP	Jyotsna Banerjee
24	Kolkata Uttar	AITC	Sudip Bandyopadhyay	CPM	Mohammed Salim	BJP	Tathagata Roy
25	Howrah	AITC	Ambica Banerjee	CPM	Swadesh Chakrabortty	BJP	Polly Mukherjee
26	Uluberia	AITC	Sultan Ahmed	CPM	Hannan Mollah	BJP	Rahul Chakrabarty
27	Sreerampur	AITC	Kalyan Banerjee	CPM	Santasri Chatterjee	BJP	Debabrata Chowdhury
28	Hooghly	AITC	Dr. Ratna De (Nag)	CPM	Rupchand Pal	BJP	Dr. Chuni Lal Chakraborty
29	Arambagh (SC)	INC	Sambhu Nath Malik	CPM	Sakti Mohan Malik	BJP	Murari Bera
30	Tamluk	AITC	Suvendu Adhikari	CPM	Lakshman Chandra Seth	BJP	Rajyashree Chaudhuri
31	Kanthi	AITC	Sisir Kumar Adhikari	CPM	Prasanta Pradhan	BJP	Amalesh Mishra
32	Ghatal	AITC	Noor Alam Chowdhury	CPI	Gurudas Dasgupta	BJP	Matilal Khatua
33	Jhargram (ST)	INC	Amrit Hansda	CPM	Dr. Pulin Bihari Baske	BJP	Nabendu Mahali
34	Medinipur	AITC	Dipak Kumar Ghosh	CPI	Prabodh Panda	BJP	Pradip Patnaik
35	Purulia	INC	Santiram Mahato	AIFB	Narahari Mahato	BJP	Sayantan Basu
36	Bankura	INC	Subrata Mukherjee	CPM	Basudeb Acharia	BJP	Rahul Sinha
37	Bishnupur (SC)	AITC	Seuli Saha	CPM	Susmita Bauri	BJP	Jayanta Mondal
38	Bardhaman Purba (SC)	AITC	Ashoke Biswas	CPM	Dr Anup Kumar Saha	BJP	Sankar Haldar
39	Bardhaman-Durgapur	INC	Nargis Begam	CPM	Saidul Haque	BJP	Syed Ali Afzal Chand
40	Asansol	AITC	Moloy Ghatak	CPM	Bansa Gopal Chowdhury	BJP	Suryya Ray
41	Bolpur (SC)	INC	Asit Kumar Mal	CPM	Ram Chandra Dome	BJP	Arjun Saha
42	Birbhum	AITC	Satabdi Roy	CPM	Braja Mukherjee	BJP	Tapas Mukherjee

=== Party/Alliance Seat Wise Matrix ===
Alliance and Party
Alliance and Party		UPA		
Alliance and Party		TMC	INC	SUC
LF				
LF	CPI(M)	20	12	—N/a
LF	RSP	2	1	1
LF	AIFB	2	1	—N/a
LF	CPI	3	—N/a	—N/a
Total		42		

== Results by alliance or party ==
Alliance/ Party		Popular vote			Seats		
Alliance/ Party		Votes	%	±pp	Contested	Won	+/−
UPA	AITC	13,321,553	31.18	▲10.06	27	19	▲18
UPA	INC	5,749,051	13.45	▼1.16	14	6	–
UPA	SUCI(C)	446,200	1.04	New	1	1	▲1
UPA	Total	19,516,804	45.67		42	26	
LF	CPI(M)	14,144,667	33.10	▼5.61	32	9	▼17
LF	RSP	1,520,772	3.56	▼0.94	4	2	▼1
LF	CPI	1,538,211	3.60	▼0.43	3	2	▼1
LF	AIFB	1,299,507	3.04	▼0.63	3	2	▼1
LF	Total	18,503,157	43.30	▼7.44	42	15	▼20
BJP		2,625,182	6.14	▼1.95	42	1	▲1
IND		1,314,613	3.08			0	
Total			100%	–		42	–

== Elected MPs ==
Constituency		Winner				Runner Up				Margin	%
#	Name	Candidate	Party	Votes	%	Candidate	Party	Votes	%	Margin	%
1	Cooch Behar	Nripendra Nath Roy	AIFB	500,677	44.66	Arghya Roy Pradhan	AITC	466,928	41.65	33,749	3.01
2	Alipurduars	Manohar Tirkey	RSP	384,890	41.22	Paban Kumar Lakra	AITC	272,068	29.14	112,822	12.08
3	Jalpaiguri	Mahendra Kumar Roy	CPM	469,613	45.54	Sukhbilas Barma	INC	381,242	36.97	88,371	8.57
4	Darjeeling	Jaswant Singh	BJP	497,649	51.50	Jibesh Sarkar	CPM	244,360	25.29	253,289	26.21
5	Raiganj	Deepa Dasmunsi	INC	451,776	50.29	Bireswar Lahiri	CPM	346,573	38.58	105,203	11.71
6	Balurghat	Prasanta Majumdar	RSP	388,444	44.38	Biplab Mitra	AITC	383,339	43.79	5,105	0.59
7	Maldaha Uttar	Mausam Noor	INC	440,264	47.78	Sailen Sarkar	CPM	380,123	41.25	60,141	6.53
8	Maldaha Dakshin	A. Hasem Khan Choudhury	INC	443,377	53.45	Abdur Razzaque	CPM	307,097	37.02	136,280	16.43
9	Jangipur	Pranab Mukherjee	INC	506,749	54.24	Mriganka Bhattacharya	CPM	378,600	40.52	128,149	13.72
10	Baharampur	Adhir Ranjan Chowdhury	INC	541,920	56.91	Promothes Mukherjee	RSP	354,943	37.28	186,977	19.63
11	Murshidabad	Abdul Mannan Hossain	INC	496,348	47.21	Anisur Rahman	CPM	460,701	43.82	35,647	3.39
12	Krishnanagar	Tapas Paul	AITC	443,679	42.43	Jyotirmoyee Sikdar	CPM	366,293	35.03	77,386	7.40
13	Ranaghat	Sucharu Ranjan Haldar	AITC	575,058	50.13	Basudeb Barman	CPM	473,235	41.25	101,823	8.88
14	Bangaon	Gobinda Chandra Naskar	AITC	546,596	50.69	Asim Bala	CPM	453,770	42.08	92,826	8.61
15	Barrackpore	Dinesh Trivedi	AITC	428,699	49.28	Tarit Baran Topdar	CPM	372,675	42.84	56,024	6.44
16	Dum Dum	Sougata Roy	AITC	458,988	47.04	Amitava Nandy	CPM	438,510	44.94	20,478	2.10
17	Barasat	Kakoli Ghosh Dastidar	AITC	522,530	50.95	Sudin Chattopadhyay	AIFB	399,629	38.97	122,901	11.98
18	Basirhat	Haji Nurul Islam	AITC	479,650	46.20	Ajay Chakraborty	CPI	419,267	40.38	60,383	5.82
19	Joynagar	Tarun Mandal	IND	446,200	48.72	Nimai Barman	RSP	392,495	42.86	53,705	5.86
20	Mathurapur	Choudhury Mohan Jatua	AITC	565,505	53.95	Animesh Naskar	CPM	435,542	41.55	129,963	12.40
21	Diamond Harbour	Somendra Nath Mitra	AITC	564,612	53.56	Samik Lahiri	CPM	412,923	39.17	151,689	14.39
22	Jadavpur	Kabir Suman	AITC	540,667	49.84	Sujan Chakraborty	CPM	484,400	44.65	56,267	5.19
23	Kolkata Dakshin	Mamata Banerjee	AITC	576,045	57.19	Rabin Deb	CPM	356,474	35.39	219,571	21.80
24	Kolkata Uttar	Sudip Bandyopadhyay	AITC	460,646	52.50	Mohammed Salim	CPM	351,368	40.05	109,278	12.45
25	Howrah	Ambica Banerjee	AITC	477,449	48.04	Swadesh Chakraborty	CPM	440,057	44.27	37,392	3.77
26	Uluberia	Sultan Ahmed	AITC	514,193	50.92	Hannan Mollah	CPM	415,257	41.12	98,936	9.80
27	Sreerampur	Kalyan Banerjee	AITC	569,725	52.68	Santasri Chatterjee	CPM	432,535	40.00	137,190	12.68
28	Hooghly	Ratna De	AITC	574,022	49.37	Rupchand Pal	CPM	492,499	42.36	81,523	7.01
29	Arambagh	Sakti Mohan Malik	CPM	630,254	54.18	Sambhu Nath Malik	INC	428,696	36.85	201,558	17.33
30	Tamluk	Suvendu Adhikari	AITC	637,664	55.54	Lakshman Chandra Seth	CPM	464,706	40.47	172,958	15.07
31	Kanthi	Sisir Adhikari	AITC	606,712	53.96	Prasanta Pradhan	CPM	477,609	42.48	129,103	11.48
32	Ghatal	Gurudas Dasgupta	CPI	625,923	53.50	Noor Alam Chowdhury	AITC	478,739	40.92	147,184	12.58
33	Jhargram	Pulin Bihari Baske	CPM	545,231	56.89	Amrit Hansda	INC	252,886	26.39	292,345	30.50
34	Medinipur	Prabodh Panda	CPI	493,021	47.29	Dipak Kumar Ghosh	AITC	445,004	42.69	48,017	4.60
35	Purulia	Narahari Mahato	AIFB	399,201	44.13	Santiram Mahato	INC	379,900	42.00	19,301	2.13
36	Bankura	Basudeb Acharia	CPM	469,223	47.66	Subrata Mukherjee	INC	361,421	36.71	107,802	10.95
37	Bishnupur	Susmita Bauri	CPM	541,075	51.33	Seuli Saha	AITC	411,709	39.06	129,366	12.27
38	Bardhaman Purba	Anup Kumar Saha	CPM	531,987	47.31	Ashoke Biswas	AITC	472,568	42.03	59,419	5.28
39	Burdwan - Durgapur	Sheikh Saidul Haque	CPM	573,399	50.52	Nargis Begum	INC	465,162	40.98	108,237	9.54
40	Asansol	Bansa Gopal Chowdhury	CPM	435,161	48.69	Moloy Ghatak	AITC	362,205	40.53	72,956	8.16
41	Bolpur	Ram Chandra Dome	CPM	538,383	49.91	Asit Kumar Mal	INC	411,501	38.14	126,882	11.77
42	Birbhum	Satabdi Roy	AITC	486,553	47.82	Braja Mukherjee	CPM	425,034	41.77	61,519	6.05

== Post-election Union Council of Ministers from West Bengal ==
#	Name	Constituency	Designation	Department	From	To	Party
1	Pranab Mukherjee	Jangipur	Cabinet Minister	Finance	23 May 2009	26 June 2012	INC
2	Mamata Banerjee	Kolkata Dakshin	Cabinet Minister	Railways	23 May 2009	19 May 2011	AITC
3	Dinesh Trivedi	Barrackpore	MoS	Health and Family Welfare	28 May 2009	12 July 2011	AITC
3	Dinesh Trivedi	Barrackpore	Cabinet Minister	Railways	12 July 2011	19 March 2012	AITC
4	Mukul Roy	Rajya Sabha	MoS	Shipping	28 May 2009	20 March 2012	AITC
4	Mukul Roy	Rajya Sabha	MoS	Railways	19 May 2011	12 July 2011	AITC
4	Mukul Roy	Rajya Sabha	Cabinet Minister	Railways	20 March 2012	22 September 2012	AITC
5	Saugata Roy	Dum Dum	MoS	Urban Development	28 May 2009	22 September 2012	AITC
6	Sisir Adhikari	Kanthi	MoS	Rural Development	28 May 2009	22 September 2012	AITC
7	Sultan Ahmed	Uluberia	MoS	Tourism	28 May 2009	22 September 2012	AITC
8	Choudhury Mohan Jatua	Mathurapur	MoS	Information and Broadcasting	28 May 2009	22 September 2012	AITC
9	Sudip Bandyopadhyay	Kolkata Uttar	MoS	Health and Family Welfare	12 July 2011	22 September 2012	AITC
10	Adhir Ranjan Chowdhury	Baharampur	MoS	Railways	28 October 2012	26 May 2014	INC
11	Abu Hasem Khan Choudhury	Maldaha Dakshin	MoS	Health and Family Welfare	28 October 2012	26 May 2014	INC
12	Deepa Dasmunsi	Raiganj	MoS	Urban Development	28 October 2012	26 May 2014	INC

== Party wise lead ==
Party	Assembly segments	Position in Assembly (as of 2011 election)
Trinamool Congress	135	184
Communist Party of India (Marxist)	71	40
Indian National Congress	49	42
Revolutionary Socialist Party	10	7
Communist Party of India	10	2
All India Forward Bloc	8	11
Bharatiya Janata Party	5	0
Bahujan Samaj Party	1	0
Others	5	8
Total	294	

== Analysis ==
=== Assembly segments wise lead of Parties ===
Party	Assembly segments	Constituencies	Position in Assembly (as of 2011 election)	Constituencies
INC + AITC	184	2 - Mathabhanga (SC), 8 - Natabari, 17 - Jalpaiguri (SC), 28 - Chopra, 29 - Islampur, 30 - Goalpokhar, 31 - Chakulia, 32 - Karandighi, 33 - Hemtabad (SC), 34 - Kaliaganj (SC), 35 - Raiganj, 36 - Itahar, 40 - Tapan (ST), 42 - Harirampur, 44 - Gazole (SC), 45 - Chanchal, 46 - Harischandrapur, 47 - Malatipur, 48 - Ratua, 50 - Maldaha (SC), 49 - Manikchak, 51 - Englishbazar, 52 - Mothabari, 53 - Sujapur, 54 - Baisnabnagar, 55 - Farakka, 56 - Samserganj, 57 - Suti, 58 - Jangipur, 59 - Raghunathganj, 60 - Sagardighi, 61 - Lalgola, 65 - Nabagram (SC), 66 - Khargram (SC), 67 - Burwan (SC), 68 - Kandi, 69 - Bharatpur, 70 - Rejinagar, 71 - Beldanga, 72 - Baharampur, 74 - Naoda, 62 - Bhagabangola, 63 - Raninagar, 64 - Murshidabad, 73 - Hariharpara, 75 - Domkal, 77 - Karimpur, 78 - Tehatta, 79 - Palashipara, 80 - Kaliganj, 81 - Nakashipara, 82 - Chapra, 83 - Krishnanagar Uttar, 85 - Krishnanagar Dakshin, 84 - Nabadwip, 86 - Santipur, 87 - Ranaghat Uttar paschim, 88 - Krishnaganj (SC), 89 - Ranaghat Uttar Purba (SC), 90 - Ranaghat Dakshin (SC), 91 - Chakdaha, 93 - Haringhata (SC), 94 - Bagda (SC), 95 - Bangaon Uttar (SC), 96 - Bangaon Dakshin (SC), 97 - Gaighata (SC), 98 - Swarupnagar (SC), 102 - Amdanga, 104 - Naihati, 105 - Bhatpara, 106 - Jagatdal, 107 - Noapara, 109 - Khardaha, 111 - Panihati, 112 - Kamarhati, 114 - Dum dum, 117 - Rajarhat gopalpur, 100 - Habra, 101 - Ashoknagar, 115 - Rajarhat new town, 116 - Bidhannagar, 118 - Madhyamgram, 119 - Barasat, 120 - Deganga, 99 - Baduria, 121 - Haroa, 122 - Minakhan (SC), 123 - Sandeshkhali (ST), 124 - Basirhat Dakshin, 125 - Basirhat Uttar, 130 - Patharpratima, 131 - Kakdwip, 132 - Sagar, 133 - Kulpi, 134 - Raidighi, 135 - Mandirbazar (SC), 142 - Magrahat paschim, 143 - Diamond harbour, 144 - Falta, 145 - Satgachhia, 146 - Bishnupur (SC), 155 - Maheshtala, 156 - Budge budge, 157 - Metiaburuz, 137 - Baruipur Purba (SC), 140 - Baruipur paschim, 147 - Sonarpur Dakshin, 148 - Bhangar, 151 - Sonarpur Uttar, 149 - Kasba, 153 - Behala Purba, 154 - Behala paschim, 158 - Kolkata port, 159 - Bhabanipur, 160 - Rashbehari, 161 - Ballygunge, 162 - Chowrangee, 163 - Entally, 164 - Beleghata, 165 - Jorasanko, 166 - Shyampukur, 167 - Maniktola, 168 - Kashipur-belgachhia, 171 - Howrah madhya, 172 - Shibpur, 173 - Howrah Dakshin, 174 - Sankrail (SC), 175 - Panchla, 176 - Uluberia Purba, 177 - Uluberia Uttar (SC), 178 - Uluberia Dakshin, 179 - Shyampur, 180 - Bagnan, 181 - Amta, 182 - Udaynarayanpur, 183 - Jagatballavpur, 184 - Domjur, 185 - Uttarpara, 186 - Sreerampur, 187 - Champdani, 194 - Chanditala, 188 - Singur, 189 - Chandannagar, 190 - Chunchura, 191 - Balagarh (SC), 193 - Saptagram, 196 - Haripal, 203 - Tamluk, 204 - Panskura Purba, 206 - Moyna, 207 - Nandakumar, 208 - Mahishadal, 209 - Haldia (SC), 210 - Nandigram, 211 - Chandipur, 212 - Patashpur, 213 - Kanthi Uttar, 214 - Bhagabanpur, 215 - Khejuri (SC), 216 - Kanthi Dakshin, 217 - Ramnagar, 205 - Panskura paschim, 230 - Daspur, 218 - Egra, 224 - Kharagpur sadar, 236 - Medinipur, 239 - Balarampur, 240 - Baghmundi, 241 - Joypur, 242 - Purulia, 252 - Bankura, 264 - Kalna (SC), 268 - Purbasthali Dakshin, 270 - Katwa, 260 - Burdwan Dakshin, 281 - Asansol Uttar, 282 - Kulti, 283 - Barabani, 285 - Suri, 289 - Sainthia (SC), 291 - Rampurhat, 292 - Hansan, 293 - Nalhati, 294 - Murarai	228	
Left Front	100	1 - Mekliganj (SC), 3 - Cooch behar Uttar (SC), 4 - Cooch behar Dakshin, 5 - Sitalkuchi (SC), 6 - Sitai (SC), 7 - Dinhata, 9 - Tufanganj, 10 - Kumargram (ST), 12 - Alipurduars, 13 - Falakata (SC), 21 - Nagrakata (ST), 15 - Dhupguri (SC), 16 - Maynaguri (SC), 18 - Rajganj (SC), 19 - Dabgram-phulbari, 20 - Mal (ST), 25 - Matigara-naxalbari (SC), 26 - Siliguri, 27 - Phansidewa (ST), 37 - Kushmandi (SC), 38 - Kumarganj, 39 - Balurghat, 41 - Gangarampur (SC), 43 - Habibpur (ST), 76 - Jalangi, 92 - Kalyani (SC), 103 - Bijpur, 108 - Barrackpur, 110 - Dum dum Uttar, 113 - Baranagar, 126 - Hingalganj (SC), 128 - Basanti (SC), 139 - Canning Purba, 150 - Jadavpur, 152 - Tollyganj, 169 - Bally, 170 - Howrah Uttar, 195 - Jangipara, 192 - Pandua, 197 - Dhanekhali (SC), 198 - Tarakeswar, 199 - Pursurah, 200 - Arambag (SC), 201 - Goghat (SC), 202 - Khanakul, 232 - Chandrakona (SC), 226 - Sabang, 227 - Pingla, 229 - Debra, 231 - Ghatal (SC), 235 - Keshpur (SC), 220 - Nayagram (ST), 221 - Gopiballavpur, 222 - Jhargram, 233 - Garbeta, 234 - Salboni, 237 - Binpur (ST), 238 - Bandwan (ST), 219 - Dantan, 223 - Keshiary (ST), 225 - Narayangarh, 228 - Kharagpur, 243 - Manbazar (ST), 244 - Kashipur, 245 - Para (SC), 246 - Raghunathpur (SC), 247 - Saltora (SC), 248 - Chhatna, 249 - Ranibandh (ST), 250 - Raipur (ST), 251 - Taldangra, 253 - Barjora, 254 - Onda, 255 - Bishnupur, 256 - Katulpur (SC), 257 - Indus (SC), 258 - Sonamukhi (SC), 259 - Khandaghosh (SC), 261 - Raina (SC), 262 - Jamalpur (SC), 265 - Memari, 269 - Purbasthali Uttar, 263 - Monteswar, 266 - Burdwan Uttar (SC), 267 - Bhatar, 274 - Galsi (SC), 276 - Durgapur Purba, 277 - Durgapur paschim, 275 - Pandabeswar, 278 - Raniganj, 279 - Jamuria, 280 - Asnsol Dakshin, 271 - Ketugram, 272 - Mangalkot, 273 - Ausgram (SC), 286 - Bolpur, 287 - Nanoor (SC), 288 - Labhpur, 290 - Mayureswar, 284 - Dubrajpur (SC)	62	1 - Mekliganj (SC), 3 - Cooch behar Uttar (SC), 4 - Cooch behar Dakshin, 7 - Dinhata, 10 - Kumargram (ST), 14 - Madarihat, 15 - Dhupguri (SC), 16 - Maynaguri (SC), 20 - Mal (ST), 31 – Chakulia, 32 – Karandighi, 33 – Hemtabad, 37 - Kushmandi (SC), 43 - Habibpur (ST), 46 – Harishchandrapur, 47 – Malatipur, 56 – Samserganj, 62 – Bhagabangola, 65 – Nabagram, 69 – Bharatpur, 73 – Hariharpara, 75 – Domkal, 76 - Jalangi, 77 – Karimpur, 78 – Tehatta, 79 – Palashipara, 123 – Sandeshkhali (SC), 124 – Basirhat Dakshin, 125 – Basirhat Uttar, 126 - Hingalganj (SC), 128 - Basanti (SC), 129 – Kultali (SC), 139 - Canning Purba, 148 – Bhagrar, 192 - Pandua, 201 - Goghat (SC), 232 - Chandrakona (SC), 227 - Pingla, 235 - Keshpur (SC), 233 - Garbeta, 237 - Binpur (ST), 238 - Bandwan (ST), 219 - Dantan, 223 - Keshiary (ST), 225 - Narayangarh, 228 - Kharagpur, 241 – Joypur, 249 - Ranibandh (ST), 250 - Raipur (ST), 251 - Taldangra, 259 - Khandaghosh (SC), 261 - Raina (SC), 263 - Monteswar, 266 - Burdwan Uttar (SC), 274 - Galsi (SC), 275 - Pandabeswar, 279 - Jamuria, 272 - Mangalkot, 273 - Ausgram (SC), 284 - Dubrajpur (SC), 289 – Sainthia (SC), 290 - Mayureshwar
Bharatiya Janata Party	5	11 - Kalchini (ST), 14 - Madarihat (ST), 22 - Kalimpong, 23 - Darjeeling, 24 - Kurseong	0	NA
Others	5	127 - Gosaba (SC), 129 - Kultali (SC), 136 - Joynagar (SC), 138 - Canning paschim (SC), 141 - Magrahat Purba (SC)	3	22 - Kalimpong, 23 - Darjeeling, 24 - Kurseong
Total	294			

=== Postal Ballot wise lead of Parties ===
Party	No. of Constituencies
All India Trinamool Congress	2
Left Front	38
Bharatiya Janata Party	1
Indian National Congress	1
Total	42

== See also ==
- 2011 West Bengal Legislative Assembly election
- 2006 West Bengal Legislative Assembly election
