= Elections in West Bengal =

Elections in West Bengal, a state in India are conducted in accordance with the Constitution of India. The West Bengal Legislative Assembly creates laws regarding the conduct of local body elections unilaterally while any changes by the state legislature to the conduct of state level elections need to be approved by the Parliament of India. In addition, the state legislature may be dismissed by the Parliament according to Article 356 of the Indian Constitution and President's rule may be imposed.

== Lok Sabha elections ==
General election results in West Bengal
2009 election	2014 election	2019 election	2024 election

Election Year	Lok Sabha	1st Party	2nd Party	3rd Party	4th Party	Others	Total Seats
1951–52	1st	INC 24	CPI 5	RSP 2	BJS 2	HMS 1	34
1957	2nd	INC 23	CPI 6	MFB 2	PSP 2	Ind 3	36
1962	3rd	INC 22	CPI 9	AIFB 1	RSP 1	LSS 1, Ind 2	36
1967	4th	INC 14	CPI(M) 5	CPI 5	BAC 5	AIFB 2, PSP 1, SSP 1, Ind 7	40
1971	5th	CPI(M) 20	INC 13	CPI 3	RSP 1	BAC 1, PSP 1, Ind 1	40
1977	6th	CPI(M) 17	BLD 15	INC 3	RSP 3	AIFB 3, Ind 1	42
1980	7th	CPI(M) 28	RSP 4	INC 4	CPI 3	AIFB 3	42
1984	8th	CPI(M) 18	INC 16	RSP 3	CPI 3	AIFB 2	42
1989	9th	CPI(M) 27	RSP 4	INC 4	CPI 3	AIFB 3, GNLF 1	42
1991	10th	CPI(M) 27	INC 5	RSP 4	CPI 3	AIFB 3	42
1996	11th	CPI(M) 23	INC 9	RSP 4	CPI 3	AIFB 3	42
1998	12th	CPI(M) 24	AITC 7	RSP 4	CPI 3	AIFB 2, INC 1, BJP 1	42
1999	13th	CPI(M) 21	AITC 8	CPI 3	INC 3	RSP 3, AIFB 2, BJP 2	42
2004	14th	CPI(M) 26	INC 6	CPI 3	AIFB 3	RSP 3, AITC 1	42
2009	15th	AITC 19	CPI(M) 9	INC 6	CPI 2	AIFB 2, RSP 2, BJP 1, SUCI (C) 1	42
2014	16th	AITC 34	INC 4	CPI(M) 2	BJP 2		42
2019	17th	AITC 22	BJP 18	INC 2			42
2024	18th	AITC 29	BJP 12	INC 1			42

== Legislative Assembly elections ==
Legislative Assembly election results
2001 election	2006 election	2011 election	2016 election	2021 election	2026 election

Election Year	1st Party		2nd Party		3rd Party		4th Party		Others	Total Seats	Remarks
Election Year	Party	Seats	Party	Seats	Party	Seats	Party	Seats	Others	Total Seats	Remarks
1952	INC	150	CPI	28	KMPP	15	AIFB	11	34	238	INC forms
1957	INC	152	CPI	46	PSP	21	AIFB	8	25	252	INC hold
1962	INC	157	CPI	50	AIFB	13	RSP	9	23	252	INC hold
1967	INC	127	CPI(M)	43	BC	34	CPI	16	60	280	INC hold
1969	CPI(M)	80	INC	55	BC	33	CPI	30	82	280	CPI(M) gain from INC
1971	CPI(M)	113	INC(R)	105	CPI	13	SUCI	7	56	294	CPI(M) hold
1972	INC(R)	216	CPI	35	CPI(M)	14	RSP	3	26	294	INC (R) gain from CPI (M)
1977	CPI(M)	178	JP	29	AIFB	25	INC(R)	20	42	294	CPI (M) gain from INC (R)
1982	CPI(M)	174	INC(I)	49	AIFB	28	RSP	19	24	294	CPI (M) hold
1987	CPI(M)	187	INC(I)	40	AIFB	26	RSP	18	23	294	CPI (M) hold
1991	CPI(M)	182	INC	43	AIFB	29	RSP	18	22	294	CPI (M) hold
1996	CPI(M)	153	INC	82	AIFB	21	RSP	18	20	294	CPI (M) hold
2001	CPI(M)	143	AITC	60	INC	26	AIFB	25	40	294	CPI (M) hold
2006	CPI(M)	176	AITC	30	AIFB	23	INC	21	44	294	CPI (M) hold
2011	AITC	184	INC	42	CPI(M)	40	AIFB	11	17	294	TMC gain from CPI (M)
2016	AITC	211	INC	44	CPI(M)	26	BJP	3	10	294	TMC hold
2021	AITC	215	BJP	77	AISF	1	GJM	1	0	294	TMC hold
2026	BJP	208	AITC	80	INC	2	AJUP	2	2	294	BJP gain from TMC

Year	Term	Chief Minister	Winning party/Coalition
1952	1st	Bidhan Chandra Roy	Indian National Congress
1957	2nd	Bidhan Chandra Roy	Indian National Congress
1962	3rd	Prafulla Chandra Sen	Indian National Congress
1967	4th	Ajoy Kumar Mukherjee (Note: Part of the United Front till November 1967.)	Bangla Congress
1967	4th	Prafulla Chandra Ghosh (Note: Part of the Progressive Democratic Front led by INC from November 1967.)	Independent
1969	5th	Ajoy Kumar Mukherjee	Bangla Congress
1971	6th	Ajoy Kumar Mukherjee	Indian National Congress
1972	7th	Siddhartha Shankar Ray	Indian National Congress
1977	8th	Jyoti Basu	Communist Party of India (Marxist)
1982	9th	Jyoti Basu	Communist Party of India (Marxist)
1987	10th	Jyoti Basu	Communist Party of India (Marxist)
1991	11th	Jyoti Basu	Communist Party of India (Marxist)
1996	12th	Jyoti Basu	Communist Party of India (Marxist)
2001	13th	Buddhadeb Bhattacharjee	Communist Party of India (Marxist)
2006	14th	Buddhadeb Bhattacharjee	Communist Party of India (Marxist)
2011	15th	Mamata Banerjee	All India Trinamool Congress
2016	16th	Mamata Banerjee	All India Trinamool Congress
2021	17th	Mamata Banerjee	All India Trinamool Congress
2026	18th	Suvendu Adhikari	Bharatiya Janata Party
