= 2014 Indian general election in West Bengal =

- 17 April, 24 April, 30 April, 7 May, 12 May

All 42 West Bengal seats in the Lok Sabha
- Turnout: 82.2% (▲0.8 pp)
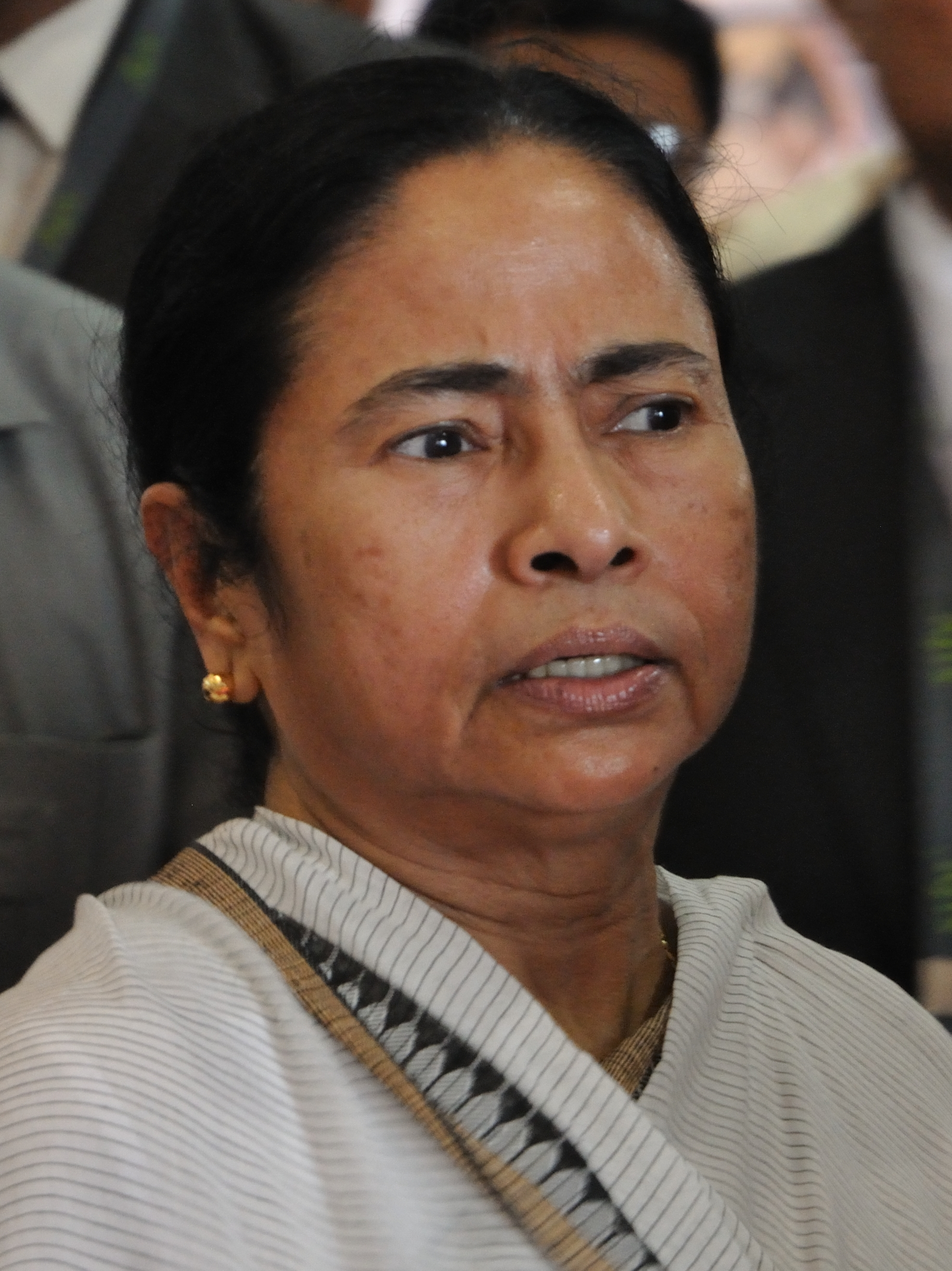

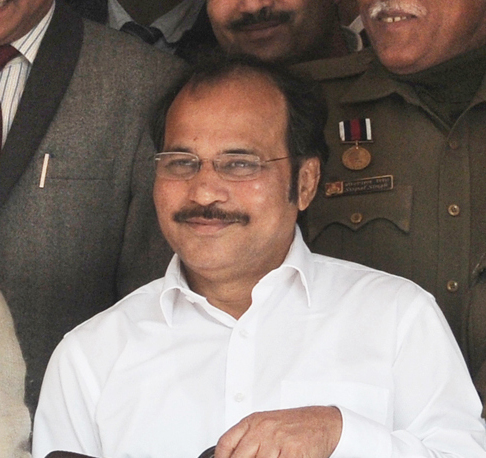

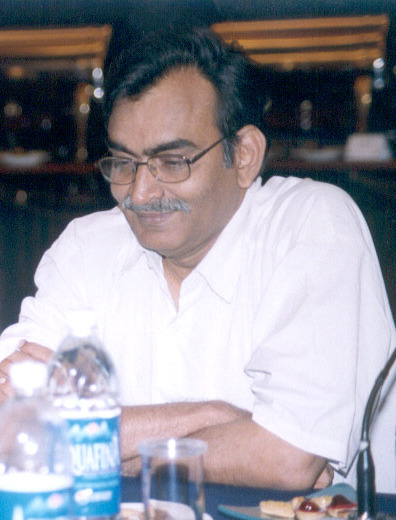

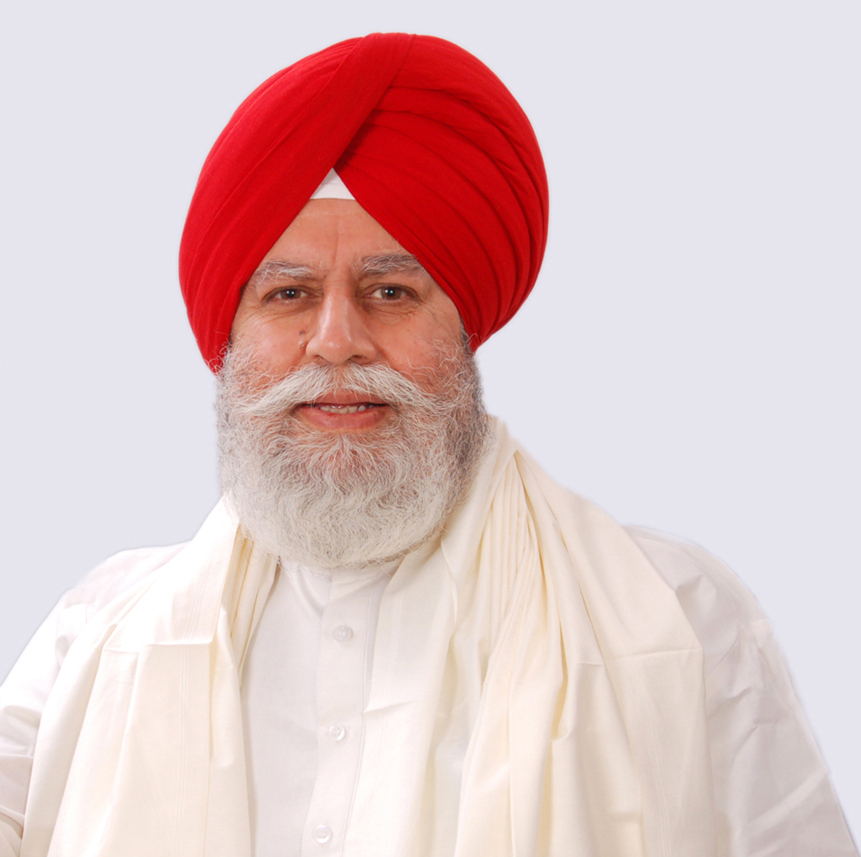
	First party	Second party
Leader	Mamata Bannerjee	Adhir Ranjan Chowdhury
Party	AITC	INC
Alliance	TMC+	UPA
Leader's seat	Did not contest (Note: Was the sitting MLA from Bhabanipur and was also the Chief Minister of West Bengal.)	Baharampur (won)
Last election	31.2%, 19 seats	13.5%, 6 seats
Seats won	34	4
Seat change	▲15	▼2
Popular vote	20,313,280	4,946,581
Percentage	39.8%	9.7%
Swing	▲8.1 pp	▼10.1 pp
	Third party	Fourth party
Leader	Surjya Kanta Mishra	S. S. Ahluwalia
Party	CPI(M)	BJP
Alliance	LF	NDA
Leader's seat	Did not contest (Note: Was the sitting MLA from Narayangarh and the Leader of Opposition in the West Bengal Legislative Assembly.)	Darjeeling (won)
Last election	33.1%, 15 seats	6.1%, 1 seat
Seats won	2	2
Seat change	▼13	▲1
Popular vote	11,720,997	8,691,765
Percentage	23%	17%
Swing	▼3.9 pp	▲10.9 pp
- Seatwise Result Map of the 2014 general election in West Bengal

Prime Minister before election
Manmohan Singh
INC
Prime Minister after election
Narendra Modi
BJP

The 2014 Indian general election in West Bengal was held for 42 seats in the Lok Sabha.

== Parties and alliances ==
Party/Alliance Name		Flag	Electoral symbol	Leader	Seats contested
All India Trinamool Congress				Mamata Banerjee	42
Indian National Congress				Adhir Ranjan Chowdhury	42
Bharatiya Janata Party				S. S. Ahluwalia	42
LF	Communist Party of India (Marxist)			Biman Bose	32
LF	Revolutionary Socialist Party			Manoj Bhattacharya	4
LF	All India Forward Bloc			Debabrata Biswas	3
LF	Communist Party of India			Swapan Banerjee	3
Socialist Unity Centre of India (Communist)				Provash Ghosh	37

== List of major parties' candidates in West Bengal for 2014 ==
Constituency		AITC		Left Front		INC		BJP	
#	Name	Party	Candidate	Party	Candidate	Party	Candidate	Party	Candidate
1	Cooch Behar (SC)	AITC	Renuka Sinha	AIFB	Dipak Kumar Roy	INC	Keshab Chandra Ray	BJP	Hem Chandra Barman
2	Alipurduars (ST)	AITC	Dasrath Tirkey	RSP	Manohar Tirkey	INC	Joseph Munda	BJP	Birendra Bara Oraon
3	Jalpaiguri (SC)	AITC	Bijoy Chandra Barman	CPM	Mahendra Roy	INC	Sukhbilas Barma	BJP	Satyalal Sarkar
4	Darjeeling	AITC	Bhaichung Bhutia	CPM	Saman Pathak	INC	Sujay Ghatak	BJP	S. S. Ahluwalia
5	Raiganj	AITC	Satya R. Dasmunshi	CPM	Mohammed Salim	INC	Deepa Dasmunsi	BJP	Nimu Bhowmik
6	Balurghat	AITC	Arpita Ghosh	RSP	Bimalendu Sarkar	INC	Om Prakash Mishra	BJP	Bishwapriya Roy Ch.
7	Maldaha Uttar	AITC	Soumitra Roy	CPM	Khagen Murmu	INC	Mausam Noor	BJP	Subhaskrishna Goswami
8	Maldaha Dakshin	AITC	Md Moazzem Hossain	CPM	Abul Hasnat Khan	INC	Abu Hasem Khan	BJP	Bishnupada Roy
9	Jangipur	AITC	Haji Nurul Islam	CPM	Muzaffar Hussain	INC	Abhijit Mukherjee	BJP	Samrat Ghosh
10	Baharampur	AITC	Indranil Sen	RSP	Promothes Mukherjee	INC	Adhir Ranjan	BJP	Debesh Kumar Adhikary
11	Murshidabad	AITC	Mohammad Ali	CPM	Badaruddoza Khan	INC	Abdul Mannan	BJP	Sujit Kumar Ghosh
12	Krishnanagar	AITC	Tapas Paul	CPM	Santanu Jha	INC	Razia Ahmed	BJP	Satyabrata Mookherjee
13	Ranaghat (SC)	AITC	Tapas Mandal	CPM	Archana Biswas	INC	Pratap Kanti Ray	BJP	Dr. Suprabhat Biswas
14	Bangaon (SC)	AITC	Kapil Krishna Thakur	CPM	Debesh Das	INC	Ila Mondal	BJP	K.D. Biswas
15	Barrackpur	AITC	Dinesh Trivedi	CPM	Subhashini Ali	INC	Samrat Topadar	BJP	Rumesh Kumar Handa
16	Dum Dum	AITC	Sougata Roy	CPM	Asim Dasgupta	INC	Dhananjoy Moitra	BJP	Tapan Sikdar
17	Barasat	AITC	Kakoli Ghosh Dastidar	AIFB	Mortaza Hossain	INC	Bratin Sengupta	BJP	P. C. Sorcar Jr.
18	Basirhat	AITC	Idris Ali	CPI	Nurul Sekh	INC	Abdur Rahim Kazi	BJP	Samik Bhattacharya
19	Jaynagar (SC)	AITC	Pratima Mondal	RSP	Subhas Naskar	INC	Arnab Roy	BJP	Krishnapada Majumdar
20	Mathurapur (SC)	AITC	Ch. Mohan Jatua	CPM	Rinku Naskar	INC	Manoranjan Halder	BJP	Tapan Naskar
21	Diamond Harbour	AITC	Abhishek Banerjee	CPM	Dr. Abul Hasnat	INC	Qamaruzzaman Qamar	BJP	Abhijit Das Bobby
22	Jadavpur	AITC	Sugata Bose	CPM	Sujan Chakraborty	INC	Samir Aich	BJP	Sarup Prasad Ghosh
23	Kolkata Dakshin	AITC	Subrata Bakshi	CPM	Nandini Mukherjee	INC	Mala Roy	BJP	Tathagata Roy
24	Kolkata Uttar	AITC	Sudip Bandyopadhyay	CPM	Rupa Bagchi	INC	Somen Mitra	BJP	Rahul Sinha
25	Howrah	AITC	Prasun Banerjee	CPM	Srideep Bhattacharya	INC	Manoj Kumar Pandey	BJP	George Baker
26	Uluberia	AITC	Sultan Ahmed	CPM	Sabiruddin Molla	INC	Asit Mitra	BJP	Ranjit Kishore Mahanty
27	Sreerampur	AITC	Kalyan Banerjee	CPM	Tirthankar Roy	INC	Abdul Mannan	BJP	Bappi Lahiri
28	Hooghly	AITC	Dr. Ratna De (Nag)	CPM	Pradip Saha	INC	Pritam Ghosh	BJP	Chandan Mitra
29	Arambagh (SC)	AITC	Aparupa Poddar	CPM	Sakti Mohan Malik	INC	Sambhu Nath Malik	BJP	Madhusudan Bag
30	Tamluk	AITC	Suvendu Adhikari	CPM	Sk. Ibrahim Ali	INC	Sk. Anwar Ali	BJP	Badsha Alam
31	Kanthi	AITC	Sisir Kumar Adhikari	CPM	Tapas Sinha	INC	Kunal Banerjee	BJP	Kamalendu Pahari
32	Ghatal	AITC	Dev Adhikari	CPI	Santosh Rana	INC	Manas Bhunia	BJP	Md. Alam
33	Jhargram (ST)	AITC	Uma Saren	CPM	Pulin Bihari Baske	INC	Anita Hansda	BJP	Bikash Mudi
34	Medinipur	AITC	Sandhya Roy	CPI	Prabodh Panda	INC	Dr. Bimal Raj	BJP	Prabhakar Tiwari
35	Purulia	AITC	Mriganko Mahato	AIFB	Narahari Mahato	INC	Nepal Mahata	BJP	Bikash Banerjee
36	Bankura	AITC	Moon Moon Sen	CPM	Basudeb Acharia	INC	Nilmadhab Gupta	BJP	Subhas Sarkar
37	Bishnupur (SC)	AITC	Saumitra Khan	CPM	Susmita Bauri	INC	Narayan Chandra Khan	BJP	Dr. Jayanta Mondal
38	Bardhaman Purba (SC)	AITC	Sunil Kumar Mondal	CPM	Ishwar Chandra Das	INC	Chandana Majhi	BJP	Santosh Roy
39	Bardhaman-Durgapur	AITC	Mamtaz Sanghamita	CPM	Sheikh Saidul Haque	INC	Pradip Agasthi	BJP	Debasree Chaudhuri
40	Asansol	AITC	Dola Sen	CPM	Bansa Gopal Ch.	INC	Indrani Mishra	BJP	Babul Supriyo
41	Bolpur (SC)	AITC	Anupam Hazra	CPM	Ram Chandra Dome	INC	Tapan Kumar Saha	BJP	Kamini Mohan Sarkar
42	Birbhum	AITC	Satabdi Roy	CPM	Qamre Elahi	INC	Syed Siraj Jimmi	BJP	Joy Banerjee

== Results ==
2	4	2	34
BJP	INC	CPI(M)	AITC

=== Results by alliance or party ===
Alliance/ Party		Popular vote			Seats		
Alliance/ Party		Votes	%	±pp	Contested	Won	+/−
AITC		20,316,262	39.35	▲8.17	42	34	▲15
INC		4,946,911	9.58	▼3.87	42	4	▼2
BJP		8,692,297	16.84	▲10.70	42	2	▲1
LF	CPI(M)	11,723,166	22.71	▼10.39	32	2	▼7
LF	RSP	1,255,794	2.43	▼1.13	4	0	▼2
LF	CPI	1,202,785	2.33	▼1.27	3	0	▼2
LF	AIFB	1,106,038	2.14	▼0.90	3	0	▼2
LF	Total	15,287,783	29.61	▼13.69	42	2	▼13
Others		1,344,281	2.60	Steady	221	0	Steady
IND		473,000	0.92	▼2.16	83	0	
NOTA		571,294	1.11	New entry			
Total		51,631,828	100%	–	472	42	–

== Results by constituency ==
Constituency		Winner				Runner Up				Margin	%
#	Name	Candidate	Party	Votes	%	Candidate	Party	Votes	%	Margin	%
1	Cooch Behar	Renuka Sinha	AITC	526,499	39.50	Dipak Kumar Roy	AIFB	439,392	32.96	87,107	6.54
2	Alipurduars	Dasrath Tirkey	AITC	362,453	29.58	Manohar Tirkey	RSP	341,056	27.84	21,397	1.74
3	Jalpaiguri	Bijoy Chandra Barman	AITC	494,773	37.93	Mahendra Kumar Roy	CPM	425,167	32.60	69,606	5.33
4	Darjeeling	S. S. Ahluwalia	BJP	488,257	42.73	Bhaichung Bhutia	AITC	291,018	25.47	197,239	17.26
5	Raiganj	Md. Salim	CPM	317,515	28.64	Deepa Dasmunsi	INC	315,881	28.50	1,634	0.14
6	Balurghat	Arpita Ghosh	AITC	409,641	38.52	Bimalendu Sarkar	RSP	302,677	28.46	106,964	10.06
7	Maldaha Uttar	Mausam Noor	INC	388,609	33.41	Khagen Murmu	CPM	322,904	27.76	65,705	5.65
8	Maldaha Dakshin	Abu Hasem Choudhury	INC	380,291	34.81	Bishnupada Roy	BJP	216,180	19.79	164,111	15.02
9	Jangipur	Abhijit Mukherjee	INC	378,201	33.79	Muzaffar Hussain	CPM	370,040	33.06	8,161	0.73
10	Baharampur	Adhir Ranjan Chowdhury	INC	583,549	50.54	Indranil Sen	AITC	226,982	19.66	356,567	30.88
11	Murshidabad	Badaruddoza Khan	CPM	426,947	33.13	Abdul Mannan	INC	408,494	31.70	18,453	1.43
12	Krishnanagar	Tapas Paul	AITC	438,789	35.14	Santanu Jha	CPM	367,534	29.43	71,255	5.71
13	Ranaghat	Tapas Mandal	AITC	590,451	43.62	Archana Biswas	CPM	388,684	28.71	201,767	14.91
14	Bangaon	Kapil Krishna Thakur	AITC	551,213	42.92	Debesh Das	CPM	404,612	31.50	146,601	11.42
15	Barrackpore	Dinesh Trivedi	AITC	479,206	45.53	Subhashini Ali	CPM	272,433	25.88	206,773	19.65
16	Dum Dum	Saugata Roy	AITC	483,244	42.62	Asim Dasgupta	CPM	328,310	28.96	154,934	13.66
17	Barasat	Kakoli Ghosh Dastidar	AITC	525,387	41.36	Mortaza Hossain	AIFB	352,246	27.73	173,141	13.63
18	Basirhat	Idris Ali	AITC	492,326	38.64	Nurul Huda	CPI	382,667	30.03	109,659	8.61
19	Joynagar	Pratima Mondal	AITC	494,746	41.60	Subhas Naskar	RSP	386,362	32.49	108,384	9.11
20	Mathurapur	Ch. Mohan Jatu	AITC	630,262	49.58	Rinku Naskar	CPM	491,494	38.66	138,768	10.92
21	Diamond Harbour	Abhishek Banerjee	AITC	508,481	40.31	Abul Hasnat	CPM	437,183	34.66	71,298	5.65
22	Jadavpur	Sugata Bose	AITC	584,244	45.83	Sujan Chakraborty	CPM	459,041	36.01	125,203	9.82
23	Kolkata Dakshin	Subrata Bakshi	AITC	431,715	36.95	Tathagata Roy	BJP	295,376	25.28	136,339	11.67
24	Kolkata Uttar	Sudip Bandyopadhyay	AITC	343,687	35.94	Rahul Sinha	BJP	247,461	25.88	96,226	10.06
25	Howrah	Prasun Banerjee	AITC	488,461	43.39	Srideep Bhattacharya	CPM	291,505	25.89	196,956	17.50
26	Uluberia	Sultan Ahmed	AITC	570,785	48.08	Sabiruddin Molla	CPM	369,563	31.13	201,222	16.95
27	Sreerampur	Kalyan Banerjee	AITC	514,933	39.88	Tirthankar Ray	CPM	362,407	28.07	152,526	11.81
28	Hooghly	Ratna De	AITC	614,312	45.47	Pradip Saha	CPM	425,228	31.48	189,084	13.99
29	Arambagh	Aparupa Poddar	AITC	748,764	54.94	Sakti Mohan Malik	CPM	401,919	29.49	346,845	25.45
30	Tamluk	Suvendu Adhikari	AITC	716,928	53.57	Sk. Ibrahim Ali	CPM	470,447	35.15	246,481	18.42
31	Kanthi	Sisir Adhikari	AITC	676,749	52.36	Tapas Sinha	CPM	447,259	34.61	229,490	17.75
32	Ghatal	Deepak Adhikari	AITC	685,696	50.14	Santosh Rana	CPI	424,805	31.06	260,891	19.08
33	Jhargram	Uma Saren	AITC	674,504	53.63	Pulin Bihari Baske	CPM	326,621	25.97	347,883	27.66
34	Medinipur	Sandhya Roy	AITC	580,441	45.95	Prabodh Panda	CPI	395,313	31.30	185,128	14.65
35	Purulia	Mriganko Mahato	AITC	468,277	38.81	Narahari Mahato	AIFB	314,400	26.06	153,877	12.75
36	Bankura	Moon Moon Sen	AITC	483,455	39.10	Basudeb Acharia	CPM	384,949	31.13	98,506	7.97
37	Bishnupur	Saumitra Khan	AITC	578,870	45.51	Susmita Bauri	CPM	429,185	33.74	149,685	11.77
38	Bardhaman Purba	Sunil Kumar Mondal	AITC	574,560	43.49	Iswar Chandra Das	CPM	460,181	34.83	114,379	8.66
39	Burdwan–Durgapur	Mamtaz Sanghamita	AITC	554,521	41.64	Sk. Saidul Haque	CPM	447,190	33.58	107,331	8.06
40	Asansol	Babul Supriyo	BJP	419,983	36.75	Dola Sen	AITC	349,503	30.58	70,480	6.17
41	Bolpur	Anupam Hazra	AITC	630,693	48.33	Ram Chandra Dome	CPM	394,581	30.23	236,112	18.10
42	Birbhum	Satabdi Roy	AITC	460,568	36.10	Qamre Elahi	CPM	393,305	30.80	67,263	5.30

== Post-election Union Council of Ministers from West Bengal ==
#	Name	Constituency	Designation	Department	From	To	Party
1	S. S. Ahluwalia	Darjeeling	MoS	Parliamentary Affairs	5 July 2016	3 September 2017	BJP
1	S. S. Ahluwalia	Darjeeling	MoS	Agriculture and Farmers' Welfare	5 July 2016	3 September 2017	BJP
1	S. S. Ahluwalia	Darjeeling	MoS	Drinking Water and Sanitation	3 September 2017	14 May 2018	BJP
1	S. S. Ahluwalia	Darjeeling	MoS	Electronics and Information Technology	14 May 2018	30 May 2019	BJP
2	Babul Supriyo	Asansol	MoS	Urban Development; Housing and Urban Poverty Alleviation	9 November 2014	12 July 2016	BJP
2	Babul Supriyo	Asansol	MoS	Heavy Industries and Public Enterprises	12 July 2016	30 May 2019	BJP

== Party wise lead ==
Party	Assembly segments	Position in Assembly (as of 2016 election)
Trinamool Congress	214	211
Indian National Congress	28	44
Communist Party of India (Marxist)	22	26
Bharatiya Janata Party	24	3
Revolutionary Socialist Party	3	3
Communist Party of India	2	2
All India Forward Bloc	1	1
Others	0	4
Total	294	

== Analysis ==
According to DNA newspaper's analysis: "BJP emerged as a potential force in West Bengal where it is traditionally considered weak.". While BJP won only 2 seats, BJP candidates for the first time, returned runner-up in 3 seats and it also got 16.8% vote share - BJP's best performance so far surpassing its previous best of 11.66% in 1991 elections. However. Trinamool Congress dominated the election winning 34 seats. The CPI-M led Left Front was decimated winning only 2 seats as the BJP made inroads in its vote share. It was also argued that, ""resurgence of the Left can never be ruled out"

=== Assembly segments wise lead of Parties ===
Party	Assembly segments	Constituencies	Position in Assembly (as of 2016 election)	Constituencies
All India Trinamool Congress	214		211	
Left Front	29		32	
Bharatiya Janata Party	23		3	
Indian National Congress	28		44	
Others	0		4	
Total			294	

=== Postal Ballot wise lead of Parties ===
Party	No. of Constituencies
Communist Party of India (Marxist)	23
Trinamool Congress	16
Bharatiya Janata Party	2
Indian National Congress	1
Total	42

Region	Total seats	All India Trinamool Congress	Bharatiya Janata Party	Indian National Congress	Communist Party of India (Marxist)	Others
Ganges Delta	10	10	00	00	00	00
North Bengal	8	01	01	04	02	00
Northern Hills	4	03	00	00	00	00
Rarh Bengal	10	10	00	00	00	00
South Bengal	10	10	01	00	00	00
Total	42	34	02	04	02	00
