= Samar Mukherjee =

Samar Mukherjee may refer to:

- Samar Mukherjee (Howrah politician)
- Samar Mukherjee (Malda politician)
