= Madhurjya Haldar =

Indian politician (born 1934)

Member of Parliament, Lok Sabha
- In office 1971–1977
- Preceded by: Kansari Halder
- Succeeded by: Mukunda Ram Mandal
- Constituency: Mathurapur, West Bengal

Personal details
- Born: 1 January 1934 Enayetpur, P.O. Ghateswar, 24 Parganas, Bengal Presidency, British India
- Party: Communist Party of India (Marxist)

Madhurjya Haldar (born 1 January 1934) is an Indian politician belonging to the Communist Party of India (Marxist) and was elected from Mathurapur, West Bengal to the Lok Sabha, lower house of the Parliament of India.
