= Kulpi Assembly constituency =

Constituency of the West Bengal Legislative Assembly, in India

Kulpi
- Constituency No. 133 for the West Bengal Legislative Assembly
- Interactive Map Outlining Kulpi Assembly Constituency

Constituency details
- Country: India
- Region: East India
- State: West Bengal
- District: South 24 Parganas
- Lok Sabha constituency: Mathurapur
- Established: 1951
- Total electors: 220,060
- Reservation: None

Member of Legislative Assembly
- 18th West Bengal Legislative Assembly
- Incumbent Barnali Dhara
- Party: AITC
- Alliance: AITC+
- Elected year: 2026

Kulpi Assembly constituency is a Legislative Assembly constituency of South 24 Parganas district in the Indian State of West Bengal.

== Overview ==
As per order of the Delimitation Commission in respect of the Delimitation of constituencies in the West Bengal, Kulpi Assembly constituency is composed of the following:

- Kulpi community development block

Kulpi Assembly constituency is a part of No. 20 Mathurapur Lok Sabha constituency.

== Members of the Legislative Assembly ==
Year	Name	Party
1952	Nalini Kanta Halder	Kisan Mazdoor Praja Party
1952	Pran Krishna Kumar	Bharatiya Jana Sangh
1957	Hansdwhaj Dhara	Indian National Congress
1962	Hrishikesh Halder	Independent politician
1967	N.K. Halder	Indian National Congress
1969	Murari Mohan Halder	Bangla Congress
1971	Mukunda Ram Mondal	Communist Party of India (Marxist)
1972	Santosh Kumar Mondal	Indian National Congress
1977	Krishnadhan Halder	Communist Party of India (Marxist)
1982	Krishnadhan Halder	Communist Party of India (Marxist)
1987	Krishnadhan Halder	Communist Party of India (Marxist)
1991	Krishnadhan Halder	Communist Party of India (Marxist)
1996	Shakuntala Paik	Communist Party of India (Marxist)
2001	Jogaranjan Halder	Trinamool Congress
2006	Sakuntala Paik	Communist Party of India (Marxist)
2011	Jogaranjan Halder	Trinamool Congress
2016	Jogaranjan Halder	Trinamool Congress
2021	Jogaranjan Halder	Trinamool Congress
2026	Barnali Dhara	Trinamool Congress

== Election results ==
Vote share of Winning candidates
2026	43.94%
2021	50.01%
2016	49.65%
2011	53.75%
2006	45.58%
2001	49.03%
1996	49.47%
1991	48.66%
1987	51.93%
1982	57.55%
1977	44.99%
1972	64.76%
1971	24.36%
1969	50.52%
1967	53.62%
1962	46.84%
1957	53.29%
1951	21.95%
1951	15.19%

=== 2026 ===
2026 West Bengal Legislative Assembly election: Kulpi
Party	Candidate	Votes	%	±%
AITC	Barnali Dhara	91,266	43.94	▼6.07
BJP	Abani Naskar	80,883	38.94	▲6.44
ISF	Abdul Malek Molla	30,052	14.47	▼1.04
NOTA	None of the above	1,378	0.66	▼0.21
Majority		10,383	5.0	▼12.51
Turnout		207,706	95.85	▲8.12
AITC hold		Swing		

=== 2021 ===
2021 West Bengal Legislative Assembly election: Kulpi
Party	Candidate	Votes	%	±%
AITC	Jogaranjan Halder	96,577	50.01	▲0.36
BJP	Pranab Kumar Mallik	62,759	32.5	▲27.52
ISF	Siraj Uddin Gazi	29,961	15.51	
NOTA	None of the above	1,685	0.87	
Majority		33,818	17.51	
Turnout		193,130	87.73	
AITC hold		Swing		

=== 2016 ===
2016 West Bengal Legislative Assembly election: Kulpi
Party	Candidate	Votes	%	±%
AITC	Jogaranjan Halder	84,036	49.65	▼4.10
CPI(M)	Rejaul Haque Khan	72,581	42.88	▲1.94
BJP	Nabendu Sundar Naskar	8,434	4.98	▲2.44
BSP	Arup Kumar Halder	1,324	0.78	▼0.24
NOTA	None of the above	1,311	0.77	New entry
SUCI(C)	Ranajit Singha	1,077	0.64	New entry
LJP	Sabir Hossen Chaprasi	503	0.30	New entry
Majority		11,455	6.77	▼6.04
Turnout		1,69,266	86.84	▲0.23
AITC hold		Swing		

=== 2011 ===
2011 West Bengal Legislative Assembly election: Kulpi
Party	Candidate	Votes	%	±%
AITC	Jogaranjan Halder	76,693	53.75	
CPI(M)	Shakuntala Paik	58,414	40.94	
BJP	Swapan Halder	3,624	2.54	
PDCI	Syed Sadrul Anam	1,523	1.07	
BSP	Arup Kumar Halder	1,451	1.02	
Independent	Bidhan Naskar	978	0.69	
Majority		18,279	12.81	
Turnout		1,42,683	86.61	
AITC gain from CPI(M)		Swing		

=== 2006 ===
2006 West Bengal Legislative Assembly election: Kulpi (SC)
Party	Candidate	Votes	%	±%
CPI(M)	Sakuntala Paik	51,396	45.58	
AITC	Jagaranjan Haldar	49,665	44.04	
INC	Krittibas Sardar	8,012	7.10	
Independent	Joydev Jantuya	2,148	1.91	
BSP	Nandadulal Mondal	1,028	0.91	
Majority		1,731	1.54	
Turnout		112,768		
Swing to CPI(M) from AITC		Swing		

=== 2001 ===
2001 West Bengal Legislative Assembly election: Kulpi (SC)
Party	Candidate	Votes	%	±%
AITC	Jagaranjan Haldar	51,045	49.03	
CPI(M)	Sakuntala Paik	46,966	45.11	
SP	Kirttibas Sardar	2,682	2.58	
BJP	Subhash Saha	2,172	2.09	
Independent	Bhola Nath Mondal	1,244	1.19	
Majority		4,079	3.92	
Turnout		104,113	73.01	
Swing to AITC from CPI(M)		Swing		

=== 1996 ===
1996 West Bengal Legislative Assembly election: Kulpi (SC)
Party	Candidate	Votes	%	±%
CPI(M)	Sakuntala Paik	53,779	49.47	
INC	Kirtibas Sarder	51,566	47.43	
BJP	Subhas Saha	1,769	1.63	
Independent	Bhola Nath Mondal	875	0.80	
Independent	Dhananjay Haldar	411	0.38	
Independent	Jogaranjan Halder	315	0.29	
Majority		2,213	2.04	
Turnout		109,811	82.40	
CPI(M) hold		Swing		

=== 1991 ===
1991 West Bengal Legislative Assembly election: Kulpi (SC)
Party	Candidate	Votes	%	±%
CPI(M)	Krishnadhan Halder	44,295	48.66	
INC	Jogaranjan Halder	40,669	44.67	
BJP	Lal Mohan Saha	3,861	4.24	
Independent	Bhola Nath Mondal	1,862	2.05	
Independent	Dilip Patra	216	0.24	
Independent	Manas Kumar Khamaru	133	0.15	
Majority		3,626	3.99	
Turnout		92,931	76.80	
CPI(M) hold		Swing		

=== 1987 ===
1987 West Bengal Legislative Assembly election: Kulpi (SC)
Party	Candidate	Votes	%	±%
CPI(M)	Krishnadhan Halder	39,002	51.93	
INC	Kirtibas Sardar	31,377	41.77	
SUCI	Samir Sekhar Naiya	2,649	3.53	
IUML	Sujit Roy	1,781	2.37	
Independent	Haldar Panchanan	301	0.40	
Majority		7,625	10.16	
Turnout		76,262	71.48	
CPI(M) hold		Swing		

=== 1982 ===
1982 West Bengal Legislative Assembly election: Kulpi (SC)
Party	Candidate	Votes	%	±%
CPI(M)	Krishandhan Halder	40,681	57.55	
INC	Santosh Kumar Mandal	28,974	40.99	
SUCI	Anukul Mandal	1,035	1.46	
Majority		11,707	16.56	
Turnout		71,954	77.38	
CPI(M) hold		Swing		

=== 1977 ===
1977 West Bengal Legislative Assembly election: Kulpi (SC)
Party	Candidate	Votes	%	±%
CPI(M)	Krishnadhan Halder	21,844	44.99	
INC	Santosh Kumar Mondal	14,360	29.58	
JP	Nalini Kanta Halder	12,345	25.43	
Majority		7,484	15.41	
Turnout		49,335	57.25	
Swing to CPI(M) from INC		Swing		

=== 1972 ===
1972 West Bengal Legislative Assembly election: Kulpi (SC)
Party	Candidate	Votes	%	±%
INC	Santosh Kumar Mandal	31,067	64.76	
SUCI	Sasanka Sekhar Naiya	15,555	32.42	
INC(O)	Ramesh Haldar	1,218	2.54	
Independent	Makhan Chandra Baidya	135	0.28	
Majority		15,512	32.34	
Turnout		49,058	64.15	
Swing to INC from CPI(M)		Swing		

=== 1971 ===
1971 West Bengal Legislative Assembly election: Kulpi (SC)
Party	Candidate	Votes	%	±%
CPI(M)	Mukunda Ram Mondal	11,752	24.36	
INC(O)	Santosh Kumar Mondal	9,800	20.31	
Bangla Congress	Murari Mohan Haldar	9,758	20.23	
SUCI	Sasankasekhar Naiya	8,559	17.74	
Independent	Kartick Mondal	7,620	15.79	
Independent	Makhan Chandra Baidya	755	1.56	
Majority		1,952	4.05	
Turnout		52,321	69.69	
Swing to CPI(M) from INC		Swing		

=== 1969 ===
1969 West Bengal Legislative Assembly election: Kulpi (SC)
Party	Candidate	Votes	%	±%
Bangla Congress	Murari Mohan Halder	25,207	50.52	
INC	N. K. Halder	22,742	45.58	
Independent	Nalini Kanta Halder	1,950	3.91	
Majority		2,465	4.94	
Turnout		50,990	70.06	
Swing to Bangla Congress from INC		Swing		

=== 1967 ===
1967 West Bengal Legislative Assembly election: Kulpi (SC)
Party	Candidate	Votes	%	±%
INC	N. K. Haldar	29,682	53.62	
Bangla Congress	P. Kumar	25,679	46.38	
Majority		4,003	7.24	
Turnout		57,064	77.87	
INC hold		Swing		

=== 1962 ===
1962 West Bengal Legislative Assembly election: Kulpi
Party	Candidate	Votes	%	±%
Independent	Hrishikesh Halder	23,339	46.84	
INC	Hansadhwaj Dhara	22,722	45.60	
SUCI	Nalini Kanta Pramanik	2,900	5.82	
Independent	Sudha Sindhu Purkait	343	0.69	
Independent	Amalendu Bandyopadhyay	311	0.62	
Independent	Golam Rabbani Baidya	216	0.43	
Majority		617	1.24	
Turnout		51,814	70.53	
Swing to Independent from INC		Swing		

=== 1957 ===
1957 West Bengal Legislative Assembly election: Kulpi
Party	Candidate	Votes	%	±%
INC	Hansadhwaj Dhara	22,948	53.29	
PSP	Hrishikesh Haider	18,403	42.74	
Independent	Makhan Chandra Baidya	1,708	3.97	
Majority		4,545	10.55	
Turnout		43,059	67.07	

=== 1951 ===
1951 West Bengal Legislative Assembly election: Kulpi
Party	Candidate	Votes	%	±%
KMPP	Nalini Kanta Halder	23,270	21.95	
ABJS	Prankrishna Kumar	16,101	15.19	
KMPP	Sushil Krishna Sarder	14,191	13.39	
Independent	Ahammad Jalaluddin	12,135	11.45	
INC	Hansadwaj Dhara	10,171	9.60	
INC	Sudhangshu Bhushan Mandal	10,168	9.59	
ABJS	Makhan Lal Paik	10,023	9.46	
Independent	Sudhasindhu Purkait	5,135	4.84	
Independent	Charu Chandra Das	4,799	4.53	
Majority		7,169	6.76	
Turnout		105,993		
