= Mukunda Ram Mandal =

Indian politician (born 1947)

Member of Parliament, Lok Sabha
- In office 1977–1984
- Preceded by: Madhurjya Haldar
- Succeeded by: Manoranjan Halder
- Constituency: Mathurapur, West Bengal

Personal details
- Born: 22 November 1947 (age 78) Dhanurhat Village, Panchnan P.O. 24 Parganas, West Bengal, India
- Party: Communist Party of India (Marxist)

Mukunda Ram Mandal (born 22 November 1947) is an Indian politician belonging to the Communist Party of India (Marxist) and was elected for two terms from Mathurapur, West Bengal to the Lok Sabha, lower house of the Parliament of India. He was earlier a member of the West Bengal legislative assembly.
