= Ratua Assembly constituency =

Ratua
- Constituency No. 48 for the West Bengal Legislative Assembly
- Interactive Map Outlining Ratua Assembly Constituency

Constituency details
- Country: India
- Region: East India
- State: West Bengal
- District: Malda
- Lok Sabha constituency: Maldaha Uttar
- Established: 1951
- Total electors: 282,451
- Reservation: None

Member of Legislative Assembly
- 18th West Bengal Legislative Assembly
- Incumbent Samar Mukherjee
- Party: Democratic Trinamool Congress
- Elected year: 2026

Ratua Assembly constituency is an assembly constituency in Malda district in the Indian state of West Bengal.

== Overview ==
As per orders of the Delimitation Commission, No. 48 Ratua Assembly constituency covers Ratua I community development block and Araidanga, Paranpur, Pukuria and Sambalpur gram panchayats of Ratua II community development block.

Ratua Assembly constituency is part of No. 7 Maldaha Uttar (Lok Sabha constituency). It was earlier part of Raiganj (Lok Sabha constituency).

== Members of the Legislative Assembly ==
Election	Name	Party
1951	Mohammad Sayeed Mia	Indian National Congress
1957	Sourindra Mohan Mishra	Indian National Congress
1957	Dhaneswar Saha	Indian National Congress
1962	Dhaneswar Saha	Indian National Congress
1967	Sourindra Mohan Mishra	Indian National Congress
1969	Mohammad Ali	Independent politician
1971	Nirendra Chandra Sinha	Indian National Congress
1972	Nirendra Chandra Sinha	Indian National Congress
1977	Mohammad Ali	Communist Party of India (Marxist)
1982	Samar Mukherjee	Indian National Congress
1987	Mumtaz Begum	Communist Party of India (Marxist)
1991	Mumtaz Begum	Communist Party of India (Marxist)
1996	Samar Mukherjee	Indian National Congress
2001	Sailen Sarkar	Communist Party of India (Marxist)
2006	Sailen Sarkar	Communist Party of India (Marxist)
2011	Samar Mukherjee	Indian National Congress
2016	Samar Mukherjee	Indian National Congress
2021	Samar Mukherjee	Trinamool Congress
2026	Samar Mukherjee	Trinamool Congress

== Election results ==
=== 2026 ===
2026 West Bengal Legislative Assembly election: Ratua
Party	Candidate	Votes	%	±%
AITC	Samar Mukherjee	106,834	45.82	−13.81
BJP	Abhishek Singhania	74,272	31.86	+6.75
INC	Md. Mottakin Alam	31,525	13.52	+6.14
CPI(M)	Jahur Alam	13,026	5.59	
NOTA	None of the above	1,447	0.62	−0.32
Majority		32,562	13.96	−20.56
Turnout		233,138	94.32	+16.73
AITC hold		Swing		

=== 2021 ===
In the 2021 election, Samar Mukherjee of Trinamool Congress defeated his nearest rival, Abhishek Singhania of BJP.

2021 West Bengal Legislative Assembly election: Ratua
Party	Candidate	Votes	%	±%
AITC	Samar Mukherjee	130,674	59.63	
BJP	Abhishek Singhania	55,024	25.11	+11.29
INC	Najema Khatun	16,173	7.38	−44.48
Independent	Payel Khatun	8,628	3.94	
WPOI	Arafat Ali	2,102	0.96	−1.34
NOTA	None of the above	2,051	0.94	
Majority		75,650	34.52	
Turnout		219,148	77.59	
AITC gain from INC		Swing		

=== 2016 ===
In the 2016 election, Samar Mukherjee of Congress defeated his nearest rival, Shehnaz Quadery of Trinamool Congress.

West Bengal assembly elections, 2016: Ratua constituency
Party	Candidate	Votes	%	±%
INC	Samar Mukherjee	96,517	51.86	+3.52
AITC	Shehnaz Quadery	53,312	28.62	
BJP	Sanjay Kumar Saha	25,746	13.82	+11.59
WPOI	Arafat Ali	4,290	2.30	
NOTA	None of the above	2,181	1.17	
Independent	Emdadul Haque	1,572	0.84	
BSP	Md. Kabatulla	1,531	0.82	
BMP	Sekh Alamin	1,029	0.55	
Turnout		186,248	77.75	−2.65
INC hold		Swing		

=== 2011 ===
In the 2011 election, Samar Mukherjee of Congress defeated his nearest rival Sailen Sarkar of CPI(M).

West Bengal assembly elections, 2011: Ratua constituency
Party	Candidate	Votes	%	±%
INC	Samar Mukherjee	74,936	48.34	+3.63#
CPI(M)	Sailen Sarkar	68,075	43.92	−4.45
Independent	Imadul Hoque	5,068	3.27	
BJP	Dilip Agorwalla	3,457	2.23	
Independent	Ashoke Kumar Saha	1,856		
Independent	Ataur	1,622		
Turnout		155,014	80.40	
INC gain from CPI(M)		Swing	+8.08#	

.# Swing based on Congress+Trinamool Congress vote percentage in 2011.

=== 2006 ===
In the 2006 and 2001 state assembly elections, Sailen Sarkar of CPI(M) won the Ratua assembly seat defeating Asit Bose and Samar Mukherjee, both of Congress, respectively. Contests in most years were multi cornered but only winners and runners are being mentioned. Samar Mukherjee of Congress defeated Mozammel Haque of CPI(M) in 1996. Mumtaz Begum of CPI(M) defeated Biswanath Guha and Niren Chandra Sinha, both of Congress, in 1991 and 1987 respectively. Samar Mukherjee of Congress defeated Mohammad Ali of CPI(M) in 1982. Mohammad Ali of CPI(M) defeated Niren Chandra Sinha of Congress in 1977.

=== 1972 ===
Nirendra Chandra Sinha of Congress won in 1972 and 1971. Mohammad Ali, Independent, won in 1969. Sourindra Mohan Mishra of Congress won in 1967. Dhanswar Saha of Congress won the Ratua seat in 1962. Ratua was a joint seat in 1957. Sourindra Mohan Mishra and Dhaneswar Saha, both of Congress, won in 1957. In independent India's first election in 1951, Md. Sayeed Mia of Congress won the Ratua seat.
