= Anup Kumar Saha (Bardhaman Purba MP) =

Indian politician

Doctor Anup Kumar Saha

Member of Parliament, Lok Sabha
- In office 2009–2014
- Preceded by: New constituency
- Succeeded by: Sunil Kumar Mondal
- Constituency: Bardhaman Purba

Personal details
- Born: 23 January 1956 (age 70) Harda Paschim Medinipur, West Bengal
- Party: CPI(M)
- Profession: Politician

Anup Kumar Saha (born 23 January 1956) is an Indian politician from West Bengal. He is a former Member of Parliament in the 15th Lok Sabha in 2009.

Saha is from Purba Bardhaman. He is the son of the late Rabindranath Saha. He did his MBBS and MS (surgery).

He won the 2009 Indian general election in West Bengal from Bardhaman Purba Lok Sabha constituency representing the Communist Party of India (Marxist). He polled 5,31,987 votes and defeated his nearest rival, Ashoke Biswas of the All India Trinamool Congress, by a margin of 59,419 votes.
