= Jogaranjan Halder =

Indian politician

Member of the West Bengal Legislative Assembly
- In office 2011–2026
- Preceded by: Sakuntala Paik
- Succeeded by: Barnali Dhara
- Constituency: Kulpi
- In office 2001–2006
- Succeeded by: Sakuntala Paik
- Constituency: Kulpi

Personal details
- Party: AITC
- Profession: Politician

Jogaranjan Halder is an Indian politician member of All India Trinamool Congress. He is an MLA, elected from the Kulpi constituency in the 2001 West Bengal state assembly election. In 2011, 2016 and 2021 assembly election he was re-elected from the same constituency.
