= Samar Mukherjee (Malda politician) =

Indian politician

- সমর মুখার্জি

Member of West Bengal Legislative Assembly
- In office 1982–1987
- Preceded by: Mohammad Ali
- Succeeded by: Mumtaz Begum
- Constituency: Ratua
- In office 1996–2001
- Preceded by: Mumtaz Begum
- Succeeded by: Sailen Sarkar
- Constituency: Ratua
- Incumbent
- Assumed office 13 May 2011
- Preceded by: Sailen Sarkar
- Constituency: Ratua

Personal details
- Born: March 1, 1943 (age 83)
- Party: Indian National Congress (Before 2021), Trinamool Congress (until 2026); Democratic Trinamool Congress (from 2026)
- Education: Malda College
- Profession: Politician, Teacher

Samar Mukherjee (born 1 March 1943) is an Indian politician from West Bengal. He is a member of the West Bengal Legislative Assembly from Ratua Assembly constituency in Malda district. He won the 2021 West Bengal Legislative Assembly election representing the All India Trinamool Congress. politicians

== Early life and education ==
Mukherjee is from Ratua, Malda district, West Bengal. He is the son of late Kshitish Mukherjee. He studied Class 10 in 1961 at Katahdiara High School, and passed the examinations conducted by West Bengal Board of Secondary Education. Later he did, Pre University course in 1964 at Malda College, University of North Bengal. He is a retired teacher.

== Career ==
Mukherjee won from Ratua Assembly constituency representing All India Trinamool Congress in the 2021 West Bengal Legislative Assembly election. He polled130,674 votes and defeated his nearest rival, Abhishek Singhania of the Bharatiya Janata Party, by a margin of 75,650 votes. Earlier, he won the 2016 West Bengal Legislative Assembly election defeating Shehnaz Quadery of All India Trinamool Congress, by a margin of 43,275 votes.
