= Jyotirmoyee Sikdar =

Indian athlete and politician (born 1969)

Member of Parliament, Lok Sabha
- In office 2004–2009
- Preceded by: Satyabrata Mookherjee
- Succeeded by: Tapas Paul
- Constituency: Krishnanagar

Personal details
- Born: 11 December 1969 (age 56) Nadia, West Bengal
- Party: Bharatiya Janata Party (2020)
- Other political affiliations: Communist Party of India (Marxist) (2004-2009)
- Spouse: Avtar Singh (m. 1994)
- Children: Avrajyoti Singh
- Parent: Gurudas Sikdar (father) Niharbala Sikdar (mother)
- Education: Debagram D.K girls school, Debagram S.A Vidyapith
- Sports career
Medal record
Women's athletics
Asian Games
Gold medal – first place	1998 Bangkok	800 m
Gold medal – first place	1998 Bangkok	1500 m
Silver medal – second place	1998 Bangkok	4 × 400 m relay
Representing India
Asian Championships
Gold medal – first place	1995 Jakarta	800 m
Silver medal – second place	1995 Jakarta	4×400 m
Silver medal – second place	1998 Fukuoka	4×400 m
Bronze medal – third place	1998 Fukuoka	800 m
Bronze medal – third place	1998 Fukuoka	1500 m

Jyotirmoyee Sikdar (born 11 December 1969) is an Indian politician and former sportswoman. She served as member of parliament of the Communist Party of India (Marxist) from the Krishnagar constituency in the 14th Lok Sabha. She was defeated in the 2009 Indian general election by the actor turned politician Tapas Paul of the Trinamool Congress. She had been reportedly inactive in politics following her defeat. In 2020 she joined Bharatiya Janata Party .

She was a middle-distance runner and won the 800 metres at the 1995 Asian Athletics Championships. She went on to win the bronze medal in 800 m and 1500 m events in the 1998 Asian Athletics Championships and gold medal in both the events in the Asian Games in Bangkok in 1998. She is a recipient of the Arjuna Award in 1995 and the Major Dhyan Chand Khel Ratna award for the year 1998–1999. She was awarded the Padma Shri in 2003.

== Personal life ==
Sikdar was born on 11 December 1969 to Gurudas Sikdar and Nihar Sikdar in Debagram of Nadia district in West Bengal. She studied till Higher Secondary. Sikdar married Avtar Singh on 9 February 1994, with whom she has a son.

== Achievements ==
Year	Competition	Venue	Position	Notes
Representing India
1998	Asian Championships	Fukuoka, Japan	3rd	800 m
1998	Asian Championships	Fukuoka, Japan	3rd	1500 m
1998	Asian Games	Bangkok, Thailand	1st	800 m
1998	Asian Games	Bangkok, Thailand	1st	1500 m
1995	Asian Championships	Jakarta, Indonesia	1st	800 m
