= Kansari Halder =

Indian politician (1910–1997)

Member of Parliament
- In office 1957–1962
- Constituency: Diamond Harbour

Member of Parliament
- In office 1967–1972
- Constituency: Mathurapur

Member of Legislative Assembly
- In office 1972–1977
- Constituency: Sonarpur

Personal details
- Born: 28 September 1910 Vill. Andaria, South 24 Parganas (then 24 Parganas)
- Died: 29 August 1997 (aged 86) Calcutta, West Bengal, India
- Party: Communist Party of India

Kansari Halder (1910–1997) was an Indian politician, belonging to the Communist Party of India. He earned fame as a leader of and for his active participation in the Tebhaga movement.

== Early life ==
Born in a Poundra family, the son of Narendra Krishna Halder Jashodarani Haldar, he was born at village Andaria on 26 September 1910. He was educated at Ripon College and Bangabasi College in Kolkata. While still a student he was arrested in 1930 for his participation in the Civil Disobedience Movement. He remained with the Congress till 1941, when he joined the Communist Party of India.

== Tebhaga movement ==
Kansari Halder provided leadership to the peasant movement that developed in the 1940s in Kakdwip-Sundarbans area of 24 Parganas and later became well known as the Tebhaga movement. Many people were killed in police-public face-off. Although he was convicted to death sentence in the Chandanpiri case in the Kakdwip area the police could not get him as he had gone underground. In 1957, he was elected to the Lok Sabha while he was still convicted. He was later acquitted.

== Electoral performance ==
He was elected to the Lok Sabha in 1957 from Diamond Harbour, was reelected to the Lok Sabha in 1967 from Mathurapur, and was elected to the West Bengal Legislative Assembly in 1972 from Sonarpur.

== Death ==
Kansari Halder spent the later years of his life in poverty. He died on 29 August 1997.
