= Mathurapur Lok Sabha constituency =

Lok Sabha constituency in West Bengal

Coordinates: 22°07′13″N 88°23′39″E

Mathurapur WB-20
- Lok Sabha constituency
- Interactive Map Outlining Mathurapur Lok Sabha Constituency

Constituency details
- Country: India
- Region: East India
- State: West Bengal
- Assembly constituencies: Patharpratima; Kakdwip; Sagar; Kulpi; Raidighi; Mandirbazar; Magrahat Paschim
- Established: 1962–Present
- Total electors: 1,649,953
- Reservation: SC

Member of Parliament
- 18th Lok Sabha
- Incumbent Bapi Halder
- Party: NCPI
- Alliance: NDA
- Elected year: 2024

Mathurapur Lok Sabha constituency is one of the 543 Parliamentary constituencies in India. The constituency centres on Mathurapur in West Bengal. All the seven legislative assembly segments of No. 20 Mathurapur Lok Sabha constituency are in South 24 Parganas district. The seat is reserved for Scheduled Castes.

== Legislative Assembly Segments ==
Parliamentary constituencies in West Bengal - 1. Cooch Behar, 2. Alipurduars, 3. Jalpaiguri, 4. Darjeeling, 5. Raiganj, 6. Balurghat, 7. Maldaha Uttar, 8. Maldaha Dakshin, 9. Jangipur, 10. Baharampur, 11. Murshidabad, 12. Krishnanagar, 13. Ranaghat, 14. Bangaon, 15. Barrackpore, 16. Dum Dum, 17. Barasat, 18. Basirhat, 19. Jaynagar, 20. Mathurapur, 21. Diamond Harbour, 22. Jadavpur, 23. Kolkata Dakshin, 24. Kolkata Uttar, 25. Howrah, 26. Uluberia, 27. Serampore, 28. Hooghly, 29. Arambagh, 30. Tamluk, 31, Kanthi, 32. Ghatal, 33. Jhargram, 34. Medinipur, 35. Purulia, 36. Bankura, 37. Bishnupur, 38. Bardhaman Purba, 39. Bardhaman Durgapur, 40. Asansol, 41. Bolpur, 42. Birbhum

As per order of the Delimitation Commission in respect of the Delimitation of constituencies in the West Bengal, Mathurapur Lok Sabha constituency is composed of the following legislative assembly segments from 2009:

#	Name	District	Member	Party	2024 Lead
130	Patharpratima	South 24 Parganas	Samir Kumar Jana	AITC	AITC
131	Kakdwip	South 24 Parganas	Dipankar Jana	BJP	AITC
132	Sagar	South 24 Parganas	Sumanta Mandal	BJP	AITC
133	Kulpi	South 24 Parganas	Barnali Dhara	AITC	AITC
134	Raidighi	South 24 Parganas	Tapas Mondal	AITC	AITC
135	Mandirbazar (SC)	South 24 Parganas	Joydeb Halder	AITC	AITC
142	Magrahat Paschim	South 24 Parganas	Shamim Ahamad Molla	AITC	AITC

== Members of Parliament ==
Year	Member	Party
1962	Purnendu Sekhar Naskar	Indian National Congress
1967	Kansari Halder	Communist Party of India
1971	Madhurjya Haldar	Communist Party of India (Marxist)
1977	Mukunda Ram Mandal	Communist Party of India (Marxist)
1980	Mukunda Ram Mandal	Communist Party of India (Marxist)
1982^	Nirmal Sinha	Communist Party of India (Marxist)
1984	Manoranjan Halder	Indian National Congress
1989	Radhika Ranjan Pramanik	Communist Party of India (Marxist)
1991	Radhika Ranjan Pramanik	Communist Party of India (Marxist)
1996	Radhika Ranjan Pramanik	Communist Party of India (Marxist)
1998	Radhika Ranjan Pramanik	Communist Party of India (Marxist)
1999	Radhika Ranjan Pramanik	Communist Party of India (Marxist)
2004	Basudeb Barman	Communist Party of India (Marxist)
2009	Choudhury Mohan Jatua	Trinamool Congress
2014	Choudhury Mohan Jatua	Trinamool Congress
2019	Choudhury Mohan Jatua	Trinamool Congress
2024	Bapi Halder	Trinamool Congress
2026 (Note: Switched to NCPI as part of AITC Rebels in Lok Sabha.)	Bapi Halder	Nationalist Citizens Party of India

== Election results ==
=== General Election 2024 ===
2024 Indian general elections: Mathurapur
Party	Candidate	Votes	%	±%
AITC	Bapi Halder	755,731	50.52	−1.32
BJP	Ashok Purkait	5,54,674	37.08	−0.21
AISF	Ajay Kumar Das	87,606	5.86	
CPI(M)	Sarat Chandra Halder	61,100	4.08	−2.51
SUCI(C)	Biswanath Sardar	4,534	0.3	
BSP	Pankaj Kumar Halder	4,257	0.28	
PDS	Bappa Das	1,209	0.08	
NOTA	None of the above	8,631	0.58	
Majority		2,01,057		
Turnout		1477,742		
AITC hold		Swing		

=== General Election 2019 ===
2019 Indian general elections: Mathurapur
Party	Candidate	Votes	%	±%
AITC	Choudhury Mohan Jatua	726,828	51.84	+2.26
BJP	Shyama Prasad Halder	522,854	37.29	+32.08
CPI(M)	Dr. Sarat Chandra Halder	92,417	6.59	−32.08
INC	Krittibas Sardar	32,324	2.31	−1.43
NOTA	None of the above	6,910	0.49	
Majority		203,974	14.55	
Turnout		1,402,019	84.86	
AITC hold		Swing		

=== General Election 2014 ===
2014 Indian general election: Mathurapur
Party	Candidate	Votes	%	±%
AITC	Choudhury Mohan Jatua	6,27,761	49.58	−5.37
CPI(M)	Rinku Naskar	4,89,325	38.67	+5.88
BJP	Tapan Naskar	66,538	5.21	+2.59
INC	Manoranjan Halder	47,376	3.74	
SUCI(C)	Purna Chandra Naiya	10,203	0.81	
NOTA	None Of The Above	9,342	0.74	−−−
Majority		1,38,436	10.94	−1.46
Turnout		12,70,985	85.37	
AITC hold		Swing		

=== General Election 2009 ===
2009 Indian general election: Mathurapur
Party	Candidate	Votes	%	±%
AITC	Choudhury Mohan Jatua	5,65,505	54.95	
CPI(M)	Animesh Naskar	4,35,542	41.55	
BJP	Binay Kumar Biswas	27,432	2.62	
IND	Biresh Chandra Mandal	7,621	0.73	
BSP	Sachindra Nath Naskar	5,165	0.49	
Majority		1,29,963	12.39	
Turnout		10,48,827	85.45	
AITC gain from CPI(M)		Swing		

2009 Indian general election West Bengal summary
Party	Seats won	Seat change	Vote percentage
Trinamool Congress	19	▲18	31.8
Indian National Congress	6	▲0	13.45
Socialist Unity Centre of India (Communist)	1	▲1	NA
Communist Party of India (Marxist)	9	▼17	33.1
Communist Party of India	2	▼1	3.6
Revolutionary Socialist Party	2	▼1	3.56
Forward bloc	2	▼1	3.04
Bharatiya Janata Party	1	▲1	6.14

=== General Elections 1962-2004 ===
Most of the contests were multi-cornered. However, only winners and runners-up are mentioned below:

Year	Winner		Runner-up	
	Candidate	Party	Candidate	Party
1962	Purnendu Sekhar Naskar	Indian National Congress	Kansari Halder	Communist Party of India
1967	Kansari Halder	Communist Party of India	Purnendu Sekhar Naskar	Indian National Congress
1972	Madhurjya Haldar	Communist Party of India (Marxist)	Bimalendu Sekhar Naskar	Indian National Congress
1977	Mukundaram Mandal	Communist Party of India (Marxist)	Purnendu Sekhar Naskar	Indian National Congress
1980	Mukundaram Mandal	Communist Party of India (Marxist)	Bimlendu Sekhar Naskar	Indian National Congress
1984	Manoranjan Halder	Indian National Congress	Nirmal Sinha	Communist Party of India (Marxist)
1989	Radhika Ranjan Pramanick	Communist Party of India (Marxist)	Manoranjan Halder	Indian National Congress
1991	Radhika Ranjan Pramanick	Communist Party of India (Marxist)	Manoranjan Halder	Indian National Congress
1996	Radhika Ranjan Pramanick	Communist Party of India (Marxist)	Sujit Patwari	Indian National Congress
1998	Radhika Ranjan Pramanick	Communist Party of India (Marxist)	Jogaranjan Halder	All India Trinamool Congress
1999	Radhika Ranjan Pramanick	Communist Party of India (Marxist)	Gobinda Chandra Naskar	All India Trinamool Congress
2004	Basudeb Barman	Communist Party of India (Marxist)	Radhika Ranjan Pramanick	All India Trinamool Congress

== See also ==
- Mathurapur
- List of constituencies of the Lok Sabha
