= Radhika Ranjan Pramanik =

Indian politician (1932–2020)

Member of Parliament, Lok Sabha
- In office 1989–2004
- Preceded by: Manoranjan Halder
- Succeeded by: Basudeb Barman
- Constituency: Mathurapur, West Bengal

Personal details
- Born: 18 December 1932 Nalkora, 24 Parganas, Bengal Presidency, British India
- Died: 13 December 2020 (aged 87) Bidhannagar, North 24 Parganas, West Bengal, India
- Party: Communist Party of India (Marxist) (till 2003); Trinamool Congress (2003–2020)
- Spouse: Mrs. Monjulika Pramanik (Married in 1958)
- Children: 4 sons and 2 daughters

Radhika Ranjan Pramanik (18 December 1932 – 13 December 2020) was an Indian politician belonging to the Trinamool Congress and was elected for five terms from Mathurapur, West Bengal to the Lok Sabha, lower house of the Parliament of India. He was earlier a member of the West Bengal Legislative Assembly from Magrahat Purba. He was expelled from the Communist Party of India (Marxist) after he accused the party of encouraging corruption. Later, he joined Trinamool Congress.
