= Manoranjan Halder =

Indian politician

Member of Parliament, Lok Sabha
- In office 1984–1989
- Preceded by: Mukunda Ram Mandal
- Succeeded by: Radhika Ranjan Pramanick
- Constituency: Mathurapur, West Bengal

Personal details
- Born: 1 January 1944 24 Parganas, Bengal Presidency, British India
- Party: Indian National Congress
- Spouse: Sandhya Halder
- Children: 2 sons

Manoranjan Halder is an Indian politician belonging to the Indian National Congress who was elected from Mathurapur, West Bengal to the Lok Sabha, lower house of the Parliament of India in 1984.
