= Basudeb Barman =

Indian politician (born 1935)

Member of the Indian Parliament for Mathurapur
- In office 2004–2009
- Preceded by: Radhika Ranjan Pramanick
- Succeeded by: C M Jatua
- Constituency: Mathurapur

Personal details
- Born: 5 October 1935 (age 90) Nadia, West Bengal
- Party: CPI(M)
- Spouse: Bharati Barman
- Children: 1 son and 1 daughter
- As of 17 September, 2006

Basudeb Barman (born 5 October 1935) was a member of the 14th Lok Sabha of India. He represented the Mathurapur constituency of West Bengal and is a member of the Communist Party of India (Marxist) (CPI(M)) party.

Mr. Barman completed M.Sc. (Tech) in Applied Chemistry at the University of Calcutta. Mr. Barman was a professor at the University of Calcutta teaching Energy technology at the Department of Chemical Engineering. He has also been the Vice-Chancellor of Kalyani University.

He was nominated by the Left Front to contest the 2009 Lok Sabha election from Ranaghat (Lok Sabha constituency).
