= Dawa Narbula =

Indian politician

Member of parliament, Lok Sabha
- In office 2004–2009
- Preceded by: S. P. Lepcha
- Succeeded by: Jaswant Singh
- Constituency: Darjeeling

Personal details
- Born: 16 December 1935 (age 90) Darjeeling, West Bengal
- Party: INC
- Spouse: Peden Lhamu
- Children: 3 daughters
- As of 17 September, 2006

Dawa Narbula (born 16 December 1935) was a member of the 14th Lok Sabha of India. He represented the Darjeeling constituency of West Bengal and is a member of the Indian National Congress (INC) political party.

He was elected to the West State Assembly from Kurseong in 1977.
