= Choudhury Mohan Jatua =

Indian politician

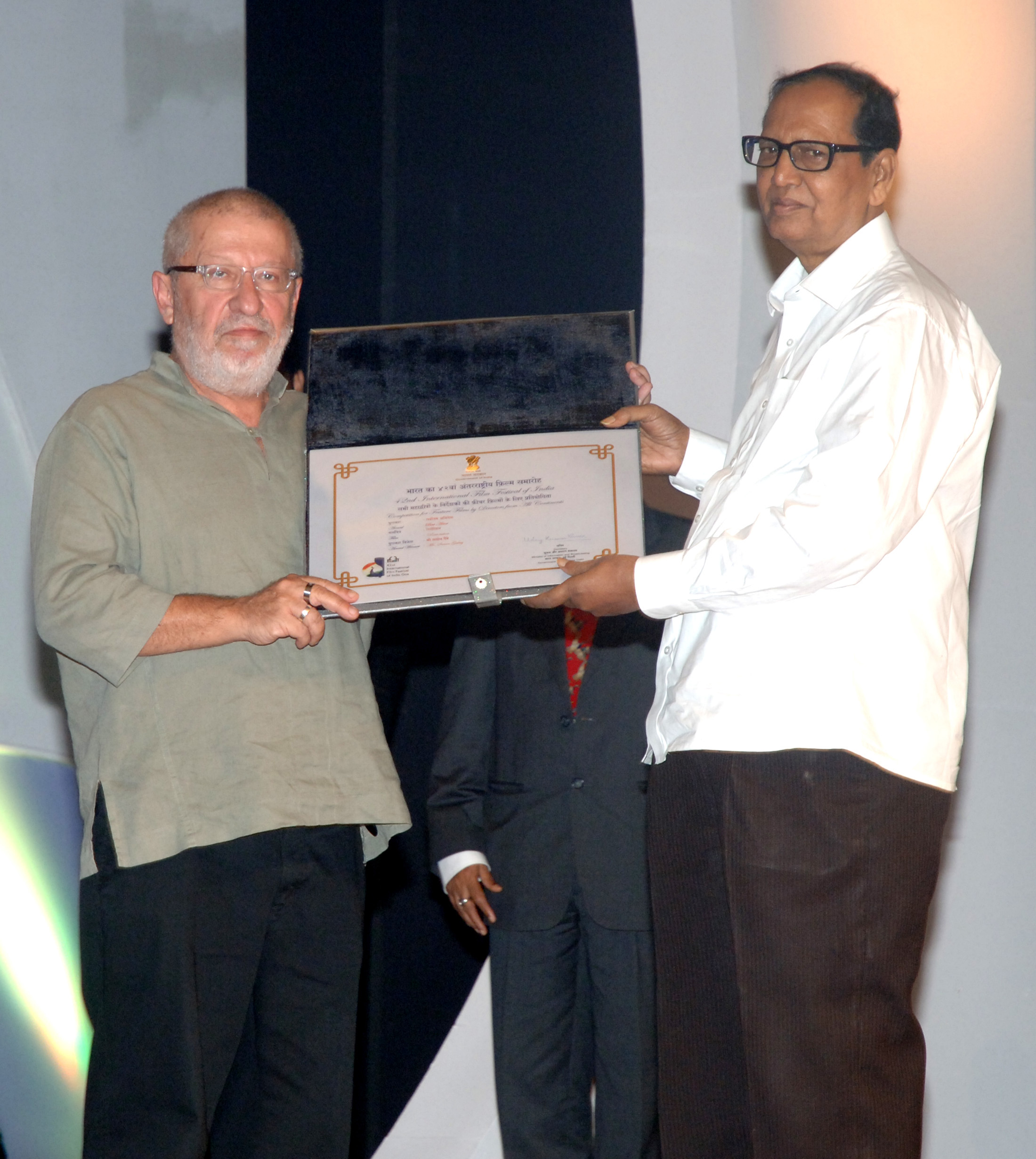
- Jatua, at IFFI 2011

Member of Parliament, Lok Sabha
- In office 16 May 2009 – 4 June 2024
- Preceded by: Basudeb Barman
- Succeeded by: Bapi Halder
- Constituency: Mathurapur

Union Minister of State for Information & Broadcasting, Government of India
- In office 22 May 2009 – 22 September 2012

Member of the West Bengal Legislative Assembly for Mandirbazar
- In office 13 May 2001 – 11 May 2006
- Preceded by: Nikunja Paik
- Succeeded by: Dr. Tapati Saha

Personal details
- Born: 9 June 1938 (age 88) Nagendrapur, South 24 Parganas, Bengal Presidency, British India
- Party: Trinamool Congress
- Spouse: Arati Jatua
- Children: 1 Son & 2 Daughters
- Profession: Social worker, Politician

Choudhury Mohan Jatua is an Indian politician. He was the Union Minister of State for Information and Broadcasting from May 2009 to September 2012. He was elected to the 15th Lok Sabha from Mathurapur.

Jatua is a post graduate in commerce from Calcutta University. A former additional deputy inspector general of police of West Bengal, he became a legislator, in 2001, by winning from the Mandirbazar constituency on a Trinamool Congress ticket.
