= Swadesh Chakraborty =

Indian politician (1943–2024)

Member of Parliament, Lok Sabha
- In office 1999-2009
- Preceded by: Bikram Sarkar
- Succeeded by: Ambica Banerjee
- Constituency: Howrah

Personal details
- Born: 22 December 1943 Khulna, Bengal Province, British India
- Died: 2 December 2024 (aged 80) Howrah, West Bengal, India
- Party: CPI(M)
- Spouse: Puspa Chakraborty
- Children: 1 daughter
- As of 17 September, 2006

Swadesh Chakraborty (22 December 1943 – 2 December 2024) was an Indian politician who was a member of the 14th Lok Sabha of India. He represented the Howrah constituency of West Bengal and was a member of the Communist Party of India (Marxist) (CPI(M)) political party. Chakraborty was the Mayor of Howrah Municipal Corporation. He died on 2 December 2024, at the age of 80.
