= Samik Lahiri =

Indian politician

Member of Parliament, Lok Sabha
- In office 1996–2009
- Preceded by: Amal Dutta
- Succeeded by: Somendra Nath Mitra
- Constituency: Diamond Harbour

Personal details
- Born: 27 January 1967 (age 59) Purnea, Bihar
- Party: Communist Party of India (Marxist)
- As of 17 September, 2006

Samik Lahiri (born 27 January 1967) is an Indian politician and a senior member of the Communist Party of India (Marxist) from West Bengal. Lahiri was a member of the 11th to 14th Lok Sabha, representing the Diamond Harbour constituency of West Bengal from 1996 to 2009. He served as the Secretary of CPI(M), S24 Parganas District Committee, till 2023. He also serves as the editor of the Ganashakti, a Bengali daily newspaper of the CPI(M) in West Bengal.
