= Barnali Dhara =

Indian politician (born 1975)

Barnali Dhara (born 1975) is an Indian politician from West Bengal. She is a member of the West Bengal Legislative Assembly from Kulpi Assembly constituency in South 24 Parganas district, representing the All India Trinamool Congress.

Dhara is from Kulpi, South 24 Parganas district, West Bengal. She married Malay Kumar Dhara, a primary school teacher. She is the chairman of the Krishi Nirbhar Agri FPC limited. She studied till Class 10 at Nischintapur R.D. High School, Kulpi and passed the Madhyamik examinations conducted by the West Bengal Board of Secondary Education in 1991. She declared assets worth Rs.94 lakhs in her affidavit to the Election Commission of India.

== Career ==
Dhara won the Kulpi Assembly constituency representing the All India Trinamool Congress in the 2026 West Bengal Legislative Assembly election. She polled 91,266 votes and defeated her nearest rival, Abani Naskar of the Bharatiya Janata Party, by a margin of 10,383 votes.
