= Sailen Sarkar =

Indian politician

Minister of State for Municipal Affairs and Urban Development
- In office 1982–1987

Minister of Food Processing
- In office 2001–2006

Minister for Environment and Parliamentary Affairs
- In office 2006–2011

Personal details
- Born: 18 July 1940 Barisal
- Died: 31 December 2013 (aged 73) Malda
- Party: Communist Party of India (Marxist)
- Spouse: Swati Sarkar
- Children: No children

Sailen Sarkar (18 July 1940 —31 December 2013) was a Communist Party of India (Marxist) politician, a minister in the state government, five-time legislator and a CPI(M) secretariat member.

== Early days ==
Born at Barisal, now in Bangladesh, on 18 July 1940, he was a teacher in early life. In 1956, he joined the movement against the merger of Bengal and Bihar. He acquired the membership of the undivided Communist Party of India in 1960.

== Electoral achievements ==
Sailen Sarkar was elected, on CPI(M) tickets, to the West Bengal Legislative Assembly from English Bazar in 1977, 1982 and 1987.

During this period he served as minister of state for municipal affairs and urban development in the Left Front ministry in West Bengal from 1982 to 1987.

He was elected from Ratua in 2001 and 2006.

He was cabinet minister of food processing from 2001 to 2006, and cabinet minister for environment and parliamentary affairs from 2006 to 2011.

The Statesman wrote, "Sarkar contested in Parliamentary elections four times but did not succeed. In 1991, he lost by a hairline margin of 1,820 votes against redoubtable Congress leader, Mr Ghani Khan Choudhury."

He was the district CPI(M) secretary in the nineties and was the CPI(M) secretariat member till his last day.

== Family and death ==
His wife, Swati Sarkar, died a year earlier and he was survived by his siblings. Sailen Sarkar died at a nursing home in Malda town on 31 December 2013 after a brief illness. He was 73.

State tourism minister, Krishnendu Narayan Choudhury showed his respect with a floral tribute and said: "Sarkar was dedicated to his party and sacrificed immensely for Left Front politics. His service as a responsible minister would be remembered always."

The Maldah Uttar MP, Mausam Noor showed her respect with a floral tribute and said: "Sarkar always maintained a congenial relationship with Opposition parties. He was a perfect combination of an able political leader and a successful administrator."

State social welfare minister and district Trinamul Congress president, Sabitri Mitra, sent her condolences to Sarkar's family.
