= Jalpaiguri Lok Sabha constituency =

Lok Sabha Constituency in West Bengal

Coordinates: 26°31′N 88°44′E

Jalpaiguri WB-3
- Lok Sabha constituency
- Interactive Map Outlining Jalpaiguri Lok Sabha Constituency

Constituency details
- Country: India
- Region: East India
- State: West Bengal
- Assembly constituencies: Mekliganj; Dhupguri; Maynaguri; Jalpaiguri; Rajganj; Dabgram-Phulbari; Mal
- Established: 1961
- Total electors: 18,85,963 (2024)
- Reservation: SC

Member of Parliament
- 18th Lok Sabha
- Incumbent Jayanta Kumar Roy
- Party: BJP
- Alliance: NDA
- Elected year: 2024

Jalpaiguri Lok Sabha constituency is one of the 543 parliamentary constituencies in India. The constituency centres on Jalpaiguri in West Bengal. While six assembly segments of No. 3 Jalpaiguri Lok Sabha constituency are in Jalpaiguri district, one assembly segment is in Cooch Behar district. The constituency has reserved for Scheduled castes (SC) since 2008.

== Assembly segments ==
Parliamentary constituencies in West Bengal - 1. Cooch Behar, 2. Alipurduars, 3. Jalpaiguri, 4. Darjeeling, 5. Raiganj, 6. Balurghat, 7. Maldaha Uttar, 8. Maldaha Dakshin, 9. Jangipur, 10. Baharampur, 11. Murshidabad, 12. Krishnanagar, 13. Ranaghat, 14. Bangaon, 15. Barrackpore, 16. Dum Dum, 17. Barasat, 18. Basirhat, 19. Jaynagar, 20. Mathurapur, 21. Diamond Harbour, 22. Jadavpur, 23. Kolkata Dakshin, 24. Kolkata Uttar, 25. Howrah, 26. Uluberia, 27. Serampore, 28. Hooghly, 29. Arambagh, 30. Tamluk, 31, Kanthi, 32. Ghatal, 33. Jhargram, 34. Medinipur, 35. Purulia, 36. Bankura, 37. Bishnupur, 38. Bardhaman Purba, 39. Bardhaman Durgapur, 40. Asansol, 41. Bolpur, 42. Birbhum

As per order of the Delimitation Commission in respect of the delimitation of constituencies in the West Bengal, parliamentary constituency no. 3 Jalpaiguri, reserved for Scheduled castes (SC), is composed of the following segments from 2009:

#	Name	District	Member	Party	2024 Lead
1	Mekliganj (SC)	Cooch Behar	Dadhiram Ray	BJP	AITC
15	Dhupguri (SC)	Jalpaiguri	Naresh Roy	BJP	BJP
16	Maynaguri (SC)	Jalpaiguri	Dalim Chandra Roy	BJP	BJP
17	Jalpaiguri (SC)	Jalpaiguri	Ananta Deb Adhikari	BJP	BJP
18	Rajganj (SC)	Jalpaiguri	Dinesh Sarkar	BJP	AITC
19	Dabgram-Phulbari	Jalpaiguri	Shikha Chatterjee	BJP	BJP
20	Mal (ST)	Jalpaiguri	Sukra Munda	BJP	AITC

== Members of Parliament ==
Year	Name	Party
1962	Nalini Ranjan Ghosh	Indian National Congress
1967	B.N.Katham	Indian National Congress
1971	Tuna Oraon	Indian National Congress
1977	Khagendra Nath Dasgupta	Independent
1980	Subodh Sen	Communist Party of India (Marxist)
1984	Manik Sanyal	Communist Party of India (Marxist)
1989	Manik Sanyal	Communist Party of India (Marxist)
1991	Jitendra Nath Das	Communist Party of India (Marxist)
1996	Jitendra Nath Das	Communist Party of India (Marxist)
1998	Minati Sen	Communist Party of India (Marxist)
1999	Minati Sen	Communist Party of India (Marxist)
2004	Minati Sen	Communist Party of India (Marxist)
2009	Mahendra Kumar Roy	Communist Party of India (Marxist)
2014	Bijoy Chandra Barman	Trinamool Congress
2019	Jayanta Kumar Roy	Bharatiya Janata Party
2024	Jayanta Kumar Roy	Bharatiya Janata Party

== Election results ==
=== General election 2024 ===
2024 Indian general elections: Jalpaiguri
Party	Candidate	Votes	%	±%
BJP	Jayanta Kumar Roy	766,568	48.58	▼2.07
AITC	Nirmal Chandra Roy	679,875	43.07	▲4.68
CPI(M)	Debraj Barman	74,092	4.69	▼0.38
NOTA	None of the above	16,848	1.07	
Independent	Shipra Roy Hakim	9,907	0.63	New entry
Majority		86,693		
Turnout		15,78,389	83.66	▼2.85
BJP hold		Swing		

=== General election 2019 ===
2019 Indian general election: Jalpaiguri
Party	Candidate	Votes	%	±%
BJP	Jayanta Kumar Roy	760,145	50.65	+33.63
AITC	Bijoy Chandra Barman	576,141	38.39	+0.39
CPI(M)	Bhagirath Chandra Roy	76,054	5.07	−27.58
INC	Mani Kumar Darnal	28,488	1.90	−4.83
BSP	Jiban Krishna Majumder	8,134	0.54	−0.39
AMB	Khushi Ranjan Mondal	2,205	0.15	−0.07
Samajwadi Jan Parishad	Ranjit Kumar Roy	1,899	0.13	
Kamtapur People's Party (United)	Subal Chandra Roy	2,685	0.18	
SUCI(C)	Haribhakta Sardar	4,692	0.31	
Independent	Sachimohan Barman	3,413	0.23	
Independent	Subhash Biswas	10,857	0.72	
Independent	Harekrishna Sarkar	6,095	0.41	
Majority		184,004	12.26	
Turnout		1,501,379	86.51	
BJP gain from AITC		Swing	+16.62	

=== General election 2014 ===
2014 Indian general elections: Jalpaiguri
Party	Candidate	Votes	%	±%
AITC	Bijoy Chandra Barman	494,773	38.00	+38.00
CPI(M)	Mahendra Kumar Roy	425,167	32.65	−12.89
BJP	Satyalal Sarkar	221,593	17.02	+7.87
INC	Sukhbilas Barma	87,588	6.73	−30.24
BSP	Kshitish Chandra Mandal	12,147	0.93	
SUCI(C)	Haribhakta Sardar	9,283	0.71	
Independent	Subhas Biswas	8,545	0.66	
RPI	Harekrishna Sarkar	7,636	0.59	
RJP	Haripada Barman	6,608	0.51	
BMP	Dilip Sarkar	4,900	0.38	
RJSP	Dhritiman Roy	4,501	0.35	
AMB	Dhirendra Nath Roy	2,835	0.22	
None of the Above	None of the Above	16,541	1.27	−−−
Majority		69,606	5.35	−3.22
Turnout		13,02,117	85.02	
AITC gain from CPI(M)		Swing		

=== General election 2009 ===
General Election, 2009: Jalpaiguri
Party	Candidate	Votes	%	±%
CPI(M)	Mahendra Kumar Roy	469,613	45.54	
INC	Sukhbilas Barma	381,242	36.97	
BJP	Dwipendra Nath Pramanik	94,373	9.15	
NCP	Dr. Dhirendra Nath Das	25,308	2.45	
Independent	Hari Bhakta Sardar	19,295	1.87	
BSP	Santi Kumar Sarkar	14,802	1.44	
Independent	Prithwiraj Roy	8,271	0.80	
SWJP	Satyen Prasad Roy	6,471	0.52	
Independent	Chinmay Sarkar	6,206	0.60	
AMB	Pabitra Moitra	5,709	0.55	
Majority		88,371		
Turnout		1,031,290	82.36	
CPI(M) hold		Swing		

=== General elections 1962-2004 ===
Most of the contests were multi-cornered. However, only winners and runners-up are mentioned below:

Year	Winner		Runner-up	
Year	Candidate	Party	Candidate	Party
1962	Nalini Ranjan Ghosh	Indian National Congress	Saroj Kumar Chakraborty	Revolutionary Socialist Party
1967	B.N.Katham	Indian National Congress	A.H. Besterwitch	Independent
1971	Tuna Oraon	Indian National Congress	Birsen Kujar	Communist Party of India (Marxist)
1977	Khagendra Nath Dasgupta	Independent	Maya Ray	Indian National Congress
1980	Subodh Sen	Communist Party of India (Marxist)	Sriram Singh	Indian National Congress (I)
1984	Manik Sanyal	Communist Party of India (Marxist)	Arun Moitra	Indian National Congress
1989	Manik Sanyal	Communist Party of India (Marxist)	Sriram Singh	Indian National Congress
1991	Jitendra Nath Das	Communist Party of India (Marxist)	Tushar Kanti Choudhuri	Indian National Congress
1996	Jitendra Nath Das	Communist Party of India (Marxist)	Deb Prasad Roy	Indian National Congress
1998	Minati Sen	Communist Party of India (Marxist)	Kalyan Chakraborty	Trinamool Congress
1999	Minati Sen	Communist Party of India (Marxist)	Kalyan Chakraborty	All India Trinamool Congress
2004	Minati Sen	Communist Party of India (Marxist)	Parash Datta	All India Trinamool Congress
2009	Mahendra Kumar Roy	Communist Party of India (Marxist)	Sukhbilas Barma	Indian National Congress
2014	Bijoy Chandra Barman	All India Trinamool Congress	Mahendra Kumar Roy	Communist Party of India (Marxist)
2019	Jayanta Kumar Roy	Bharatiya Janata Party	Bijoy Chandra Barman	All India Trinamool Congress

== See also ==
- List of constituencies of the Lok Sabha
