= Ananta Deb Adhikari =

Ananta Deb Adhikari may refers to:

- Ananta Deb Adhikari (Jalpaiguri MLA)
- Ananta Deb Adhikari (Maynaguri MLA)
