= Anupam Sen (politician) =

Indian physician and politician

MLA of Jalpaiguri Vidhan Sabha Constituency
- In office 1991–2001
- Preceded by: Nirmal Kumar Bose
- Succeeded by: Gobinda Roy
- In office 1971–1977
- Preceded by: Naresh Chandra Chakraborty
- Succeeded by: Nirmal Kumar Bose

Personal details
- Born: 1925/26
- Died: 7 September 2015
- Party: All India Trinamool Congress

Anupam Sen (1920s-2015) was an Indian physician and politician belonging to All India Trinamool Congress. He was elected as MLA of Jalpaiguri Vidhan Sabha Constituency in West Bengal Legislative Assembly in 1971, 1972, 1991 and 1996. He died on 7 September 2015 at the age of 89.
