= Debaprasad Roy =

Indian politician

Member of West Bengal Legislative Assembly
- In office 8 May 2006 – 18 April 2011
- Preceded by: Gobinda Roy
- Succeeded by: Sukhbilas Barma
- Constituency: Jalpaiguri Assembly constituency
- In office 10 May 2011 – 4 April 2016
- Succeeded by: Sourav Chakraborty
- Constituency: Alipurduars Assembly constituency
- Preceded by: Nirmal Das

Member of Parliament, Rajya Sabha
- In office 1 August 1984 – 30 May 1990
- Succeeded by: Ashoke Kumar Sen
- Constituency: West Bengal

Personal details
- Born: Jalpaiguri, West Bengal, India
- Party: Indian National Congress
- Education: University of North Bengal
- Profession: Politician

Debaprasad Roy, popularly known as Mithuda, is an Indian politician from Jalpaiguri. He was served as Member of Rajya Sabha from 1984 to 1990 and later he served as Member of the West Bengal Legislative Assembly from 2006 to 2016, representing the Jalpaiguri and Alipurduars Assembly constituencies.

== See also ==
- 2006 West Bengal Legislative Assembly election
- West Bengal Legislative Assembly
