= Ramsai =

- Village
- Location in West Bengal, India Ramsai (India)
- Coordinates: 26.72°N 88.85°E
- Country: India
- State: West Bengal
- District: Jalpaiguri

Government
  - Type: Gram panchayat

Population (2011)
  - Total: 1,974

Languages
  - Official: Bengali, English
- Time zone: UTC+5:30 (IST)
- PIN: 735219
- Lok Sabha constituency: Jalpaiguri
- Vidhan Sabha constituency: Maynaguri

Ramsai is a forest village within Ramsai Wildlife (Gorumara National Park) in the Maynaguri CD block of the Jalpaiguri district in the state of West Bengal, India.
