= Kaushik Roy (politician) =

Indian politician

Member of the West Bengal Legislative Assembly
- In office 2 May 2021 – 4 May 2026
- Preceded by: Ananta Deb Adhikari
- Succeeded by: Dalim Chandra Roy
- Constituency: Maynaguri

Personal details
- Party: BJP
- Profession: Politician

Kaushik Roy is an Indian politician from BJP. In May 2021, he was elected as the member of the West Bengal Legislative Assembly from Maynaguri.

== Career ==
Roy is from Maynaguri, Jalpaiguri district. His father's name is Nayan Chandra Roy. He passed Higher Secondary from West Bengal Council of Higher Secondary Education Year 2001 and D.El.Ed West Bengal Board of Primary Education Year 2015. He contested in 2021 West Bengal Legislative Assembly election from Maynaguri Vidhan Sabha and won the seat on 2 May 2021.
