= Birendra Nath Katham =

Indian politician

Member of Parliament, Lok Sabha
- In office 1967–1971
- Preceded by: Nalini Ranjan Ghosh
- Succeeded by: Tuna Oraon
- Constituency: Jalpaiguri
- In office 1952–1957
- Succeeded by: Upendra Nath Barman
- Constituency: Cooch Behar

Personal details
- Born: January 1906 Kathambari, Jalpaiguri, Bengal Presidency, British India
- Party: Indian National Congress
- Spouse: Puspa Rani Katham

Birendra Nath Katham is an Indian politician. He was elected to the Lok Sabha, lower house of the Parliament of India as a member of the Indian National Congress.
