= Ananta Deb Adhikari (Maynaguri MLA) =

Indian politician

1st Chairman of Maynaguri Municipality
- In office 23 February 2022 – 6 November 2025
- Preceded by: position established
- Succeeded by: Manoj Roy

Member of Chairman Board (Administrative Board), North Bengal State Transport Corporation
- Incumbent
- Assumed office 20 May 2021

President of Rogi Kalyan Samiti, Maynaguri Rural Hospital
- Incumbent
- Assumed office 2020

Member of the West Bengal Legislative Assembly
- In office 14 May 2011 – 4 May 2021
- Preceded by: Bachchamohan Roy
- Succeeded by: Kaushik Roy
- Constituency: Maynaguri

Personal details
- Party: All India Trinamool Congress (2014-Present); Revolutionary Socialist Party (India) (before 2014)
- Occupation: Politician

Ananta Deb Adhikari is an Indian politician from West Bengal, India who had served as 1st Chairman of Maynaguri Municipality, and currently as President of Rogi Kalyan Samiti, Maynaguri Rural Hospital and Board Member of NBSTC. He is a former member of the West Bengal Legislative Assembly representing the Maynaguri (Vidhan Sabha constituency) three times. He was the leader of first Maynaguri Municipality election in 2022 . He was the first Chairman of Maynaguri municipality.

== Political career ==
Adhikari is a member of the All India Trinamool Congress.

Adhikari represents the Maynaguri (Vidhan Sabha constituency). In 2014 (By-Election) Adhikari won the Maynaguri (Vidhan Sabha constituency) on an All India Trinamool Congress ticket. In 2011 Adhikari won the Maynaguri seat on a Revolutionary Socialist Party (RSP) ticket.

State Legislative Assembly
Preceded by Bachchamohan Roy; Revolutionary Socialist Party (RSP)	Member of the West Bengal Legislative Assembly from Maynaguri Assembly constituency 2011 –	Incumbent
