= Jotindra Nath Roy =

Indian politician (died 2019)

MLA of Rajganj Vidhan Sabha Constituency
- In office 1991–2006
- Preceded by: Dhirendra Nath Roy
- Succeeded by: Mahendra Kumar Roy

Personal details
- Born: 1934/35
- Died: 23 April 2019
- Party: Communist Party of India (Marxist)

Jotindra Nath Roy was an Indian politician. He was elected as MLA of Goalpokhar Vidhan Sabha Constituency in West Bengal Legislative Assembly in 1991, 1996 and 2001. He died on 23 April 2019 at the age of 84.
