= Tuna Oraon =

Indian politician (born 1931)

Member of Parliament, Lok Sabha
- In office 1971-1977
- Preceded by: B.N.Katham
- Succeeded by: Khagendra Nath Dasgupta
- Constituency: Jalpaiguri, West Bengal

Personal details
- Born: 4 January 1931 Domba, Ranchi, Bihar, British India
- Party: Indian National Congress
- Spouse: Gangawati Debi Oraon
- Children: 4 sons and 2 daughters

Tuna Oraon (born 4 January 1931) was an Indian politician belonging to the Indian National Congress. He was elected to the Lok Sabha, lower house of the Parliament of India from Jalpaiguri in 1971.
