= Jalpaiguri Assembly constituency =

Jalpaiguri (SC)
- Constituency No. 17 for the West Bengal Legislative Assembly
- Interactive Map Outlining Jalpaiguri (SC) Assembly Constituency

Constituency details
- Country: India
- Region: East India
- State: West Bengal
- District: Jalpaiguri
- Lok Sabha constituency: Jalpaiguri (SC)
- Established: 1951
- Total electors: 251,217
- Reservation: SC

Member of Legislative Assembly
- 18th West Bengal Legislative Assembly
- Incumbent Ananta Deb Adhikary
- Party: Bharatiya Janata Party
- Elected year: 2026

Most Successful parties from Jalpaiguri (SC) assembly
1. Indian National Congress (11 times) (61.1%)
2. All India Forward Bloc (4 times) (22.2%)
3. Communist Party of India (1 time) (5.55%)
4. All India Trinamool Congress (1 time) (5.55%)
5. Bharatiya Janata Party (1 time) (5.55%)

Jalpaiguri (SC) is an assembly constituency in Jalpaiguri district in the Indian state of West Bengal. It is reserved for scheduled castes.

== Overview ==
As per orders of the Delimitation Commission, No. 17 Jalpaiguri Assembly constituency (SC) covers Jalpaiguri municipality, and Arabinda, Bahadur, Boalmari Nandanpur, Garalbari, Kharia, Kharija Berubari I, Kharija Berubari II, Mondalghat, Nagar Berubari and South Berubari gram panchayats of Jalpaiguri community development block,

Jalpaiguri Assembly constituency is part of No. 3 Jalpaiguri (Lok Sabha constituency) (SC).

== Members of the Legislative Assembly ==
Year	Name	Party
1951	Khagendra Nath Dasgupta	Indian National Congress
1957	Khagendra Nath Dasgupta	Indian National Congress
1962	Khagendra Nath Dasgupta	Indian National Congress
1967	Khagendra Nath Dasgupta	Indian National Congress
1969	Naresh Chandra Chakraborty	Communist Party of India
1971	Anupam Sen	Indian National Congress
1972	Anupam Sen	Indian National Congress
1977	Nirmal Kumar Bose	All India Forward Bloc
1982	Nirmal Kumar Bose	All India Forward Bloc
1987	Nirmal Kumar Bose	All India Forward Bloc
1991	Anupam Sen	Indian National Congress
1996	Anupam Sen	Indian National Congress
2001	Gobinda Roy	All India Forward Bloc
2006	Debaprasad Roy	Indian National Congress
2011	Sukhbilas Barma	Indian National Congress
2016	Sukhbilas Barma	Indian National Congress
2021	Pradip Kumar Barma	All India Trinamool Congress
2026	Ananta Deb Adhikari	Bharatiya Janata Party

== Election results ==
=== 2026 ===
In the 2026 West Bengal Legislative Assembly election, Ananta Deb Adhikary of BJP defeated his nearest rival Krishna Das of TMC by 68,805 votes.

2026 West Bengal Legislative Assembly election: Jalpaiguri (SC)
Party	Candidate	Votes	%	±%
BJP	Ananta Deb Adhikary	142,987	60.11	▲18.18
AITC	Krishna Das	74,182	31.19	▼11.15
CPI(M)	Debraj Barman	11,324	4.76	New entry
INC	Sudipta Mohanta	2,617	1.1	▼9.62
IND	Sujit Mandal	1,322	0.56	New entry
IND	Debendranath Roy	705	0.3	New entry
SUCI(C)	Jashoda Barman	511	0.21	▼0.19
BSP	Bedodyuti Roy	385	0.16	▼0.55
IND	Ambalika Roy	342	0.14	New entry
IND	Tumpa Das	230	0.1	New entry
KPP(U)	Manabendra Roy	183	0.08	New entry
IND	Ujjal Sarkar	172	0.07	New entry
GSD	Bilash Sarkar	163	0.07	New entry
AMB	Iswar Barai	125	0.05	▼0.4
NOTA	Nota	2,608	1.1	▼0.4
Majority		68,805	28.92	▲28.51
Turnout		237,856	94.68	▲8.61
Registered electors		251,217		▼4.3
BJP gain from AITC		Swing	14.66	

=== 2021 ===
2021 West Bengal Legislative Assembly election: Jalpaiguri (SC) constituency
Party	Candidate	Votes	%	±%
AITC	Pradip Kumar Barma	95,668	42.34	
BJP	Sujit Singha	94,727	41.93	
INC	Sukhbilas Barma	24,228	10.72	
NOTA	None of the above	3,381	1.5	
Majority		941	0.41	
Turnout		225,933	86.07	

=== 2016 ===
2016 West Bengal Legislative Assembly election: Jalpaiguri (SC) constituency
Party	Candidate	Votes	%	±%
INC	Sukhbilas Barma	94553		
AITC	Dharitri Mohan Roy	89396		
BJP	Tapan Roy	16029		
Turnout				

=== 2011 ===
In the 2011 elections, Sukh Bilas Barma of Congress defeated his nearest rival Gobinda Chandra Roy of AIFB.

West Bengal assembly elections, 2011: Jalpaiguri (SC) constituency
Party	Candidate	Votes	%	±%
INC	Sukhbilas Barma	86,273	48.64	−2.37#
AIFB	Gobinda Chandra Roy	75,222	42.41	−1.32
BJP	Sisir Kanti Mondal	6,108	3.44	
BSP	Jiban Krishna Majumder	3,213		
Independent	Laxmi Kanta Roy	2,773		
SUCI(C)	Haribhakta Sardar	1,930		
AMB	Mahadeb Chandra Das	1,844		
Turnout		177,363	85.43	
INC hold		Swing	-1.05#	

.# Swing calculated on Congress+Trinamool Congress vote percentages taken together in 2006.

=== 2006 ===
In the 2006 state assembly elections, Deba Prasad Roy of Congress won the Jalpaiguri assembly seat defeating his nearest rival Gobinda Roy of Forward Bloc. Contests in most years were multi cornered but only winners and runners are being mentioned. In 2001, Gobinda Roy of Forward Bloc defeated Anupam Sen representing Trinamool Congress. Anupam Sen representing Congress defeated of Sudhansu Majumdar of Forward Bloc in 1996 and Nirmal Kumar Bose of Forward Bloc in 1991, Nirmal Kumar Bose of Forward Bloc defeated Anupam Sen of Congress in 1987 and 1982, and Devendra Mohan Sarkar of Janata Party in 1977.

=== 1972 ===
Anupam Sen of Congress won in 1972 and 1971. Naresh Chandra Chakraborty of CPI won in 1969. Khagendra Nath Dasgupta of Congress won in 1967 and 1962. Prior to that Jalpaiguri was a joint seat. Sarojendra Deb Raikut and Khagendra Nath Dasgupta, both of Congress, won in 1957. In independent India's first election in 1951, Ashrumati Devi and Khagendra Nath Dasgupta, both of Congress, won.
