= Jalpesh Temple =

Hindu temple in West Bengal, India

Coordinates: 26°31′32″N 88°52′01″E

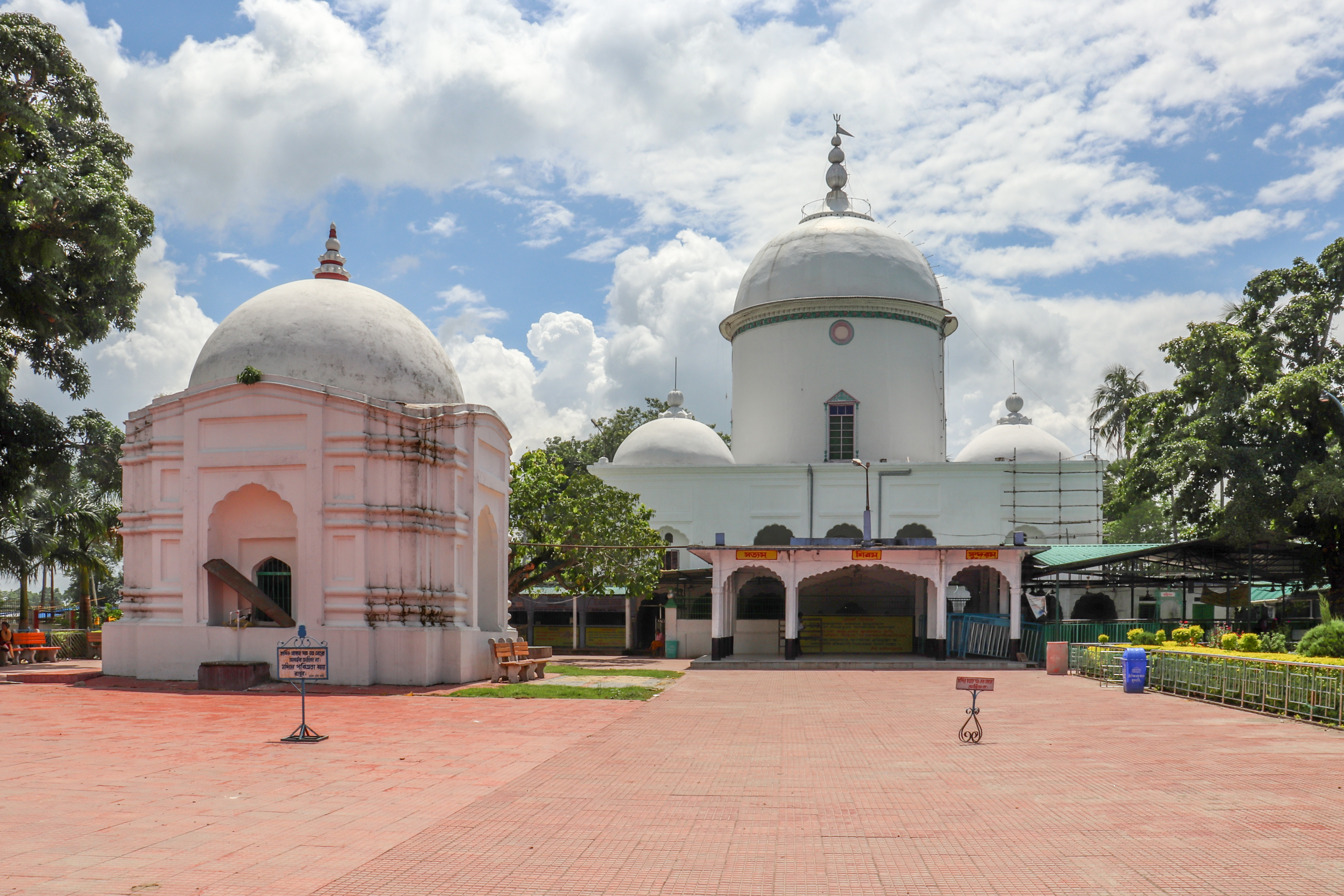

Religion
- Affiliation: Hinduism
- District: Jalpaiguri
- Deity: Shiva
- Festival: Maha Shivaratri
- Governing body: Jalpesh Temple Board of Trustees

Location
- Location: Mainaguri
- State: West Bengal
- Country: India
- Interactive map of Jalpesh Temple

Architecture
- Creator: Biswa Singha
- Established: 1524; 1563 (reconstruction); 1653 (Reconstructed by Raja Pran Narayana); 30 January 1899 (Restoration by Queen Jagadeswari Devi)

Jalpesh Temple (Rangpuri: zolpeś mondir, Bengali: jolpeś mondir) is an important Hindu temple dedicated to the Bhramari Saktipitha's Bhairava as Jalpesh. The worshiped in this temple is Bhairava as Jalpesh, a form of Shiva – one of Hinduism's trinity of supreme divinity. The temple is located on the banks of the Jarda river, 7–8 km from Mainaguri town in the Indian state of West Bengal.

== History ==
Bishwa Singha, father of Maharaja Nara Narayan of Cooch Behar, founded the Jalpesh temple in 1524. Later he rebuilt the temple in 1563. Again after 100 years, King Pran Narayan rebuilt this temple in 1663.

During the reign of King Lakshmi Narayan of Cooch Behar, Mahidev Raikut declared his independence in 1621 AD, refusing to obedience to the Koch dynasty. Since then the temple was under the supervision of Raikats of Baikunthapur. It was restored on 30 January 1899 by Rani Jagadeswari Devi, wife of King Jagendra Deva Raikut.

An earthquake occurred in Jalpaiguri district on 26 April 2015 at 11:41 AM (IST). The duration of the earthquake was 58 seconds. Initially, the magnitude of the tremor was 7.5 on the Richter scale, but it was finally 7.8. University of North Bengal's meteorologist Subir Sarkar said that the magnitude of the earthquake in Jalpaiguri was 6.9 on the Richter scale. The earthquake caused numerous cracks in the walls and spire of the ancient Jalpesh temple.

== Deity ==
The worshipped deity in the temple is Bhairava as Jalpesh. Inside the temple there is a Shivalinga called 'Anadi'.

== Festivals and fairs ==
The main festival celebrated in this temple is Mahashivratri. Pilgrims come in July–August and February–March to worship Lord Shiva. Shravani Mela is held in the temple during the month of Shravan. Ever since the construction of the temple in the 17th century, a famous fair started here on the occasion of Shiva Ratri. The fair is one of the oldest fairs in West Bengal. Hundreds of thousands of people gather for the fair. Before India's independence, elephants were sold at these fairs. People from Nepal, Bhutan, Bangladesh and other nearby states come here for the fair.

== Jalpesh Temple gallery ==
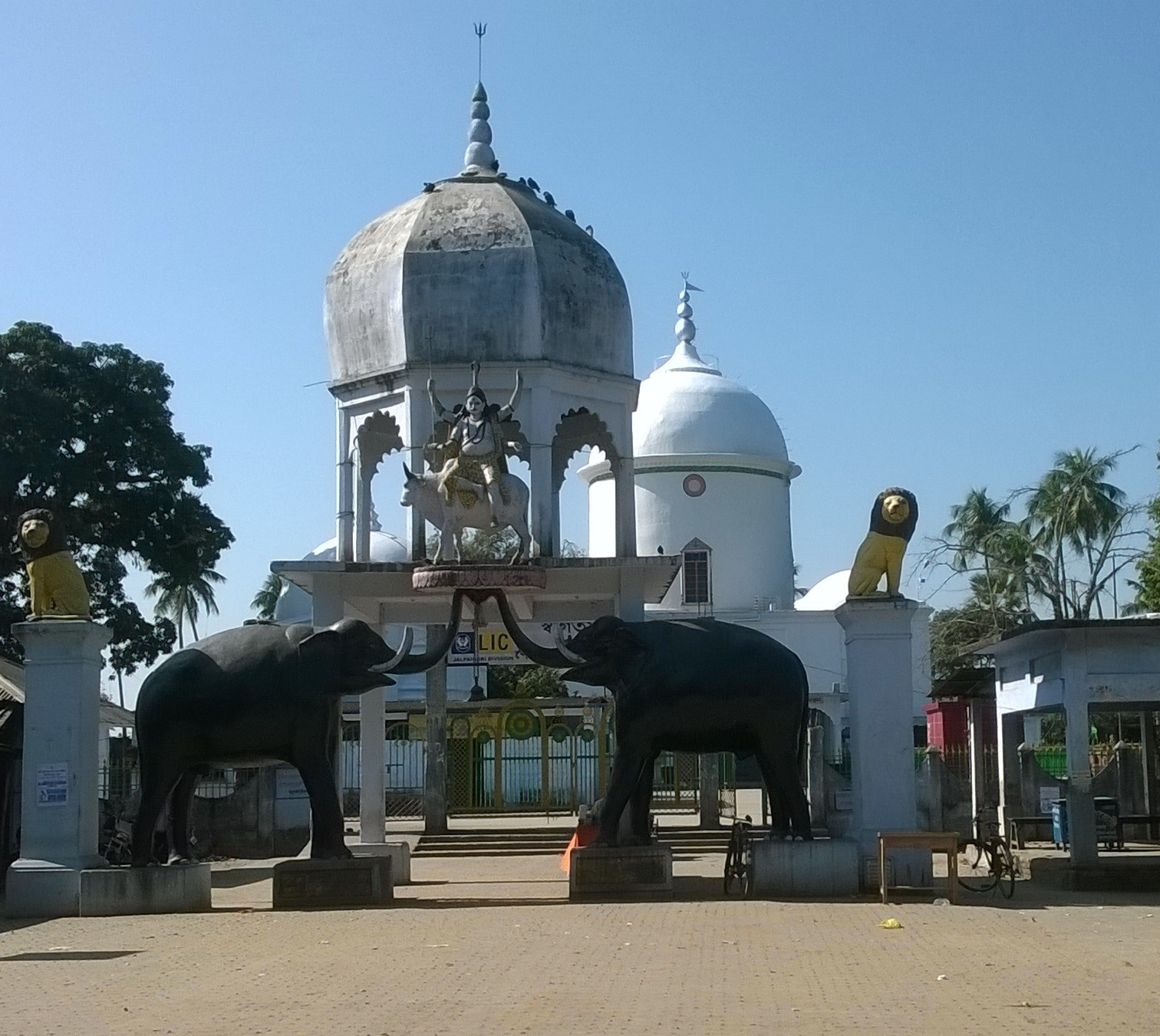

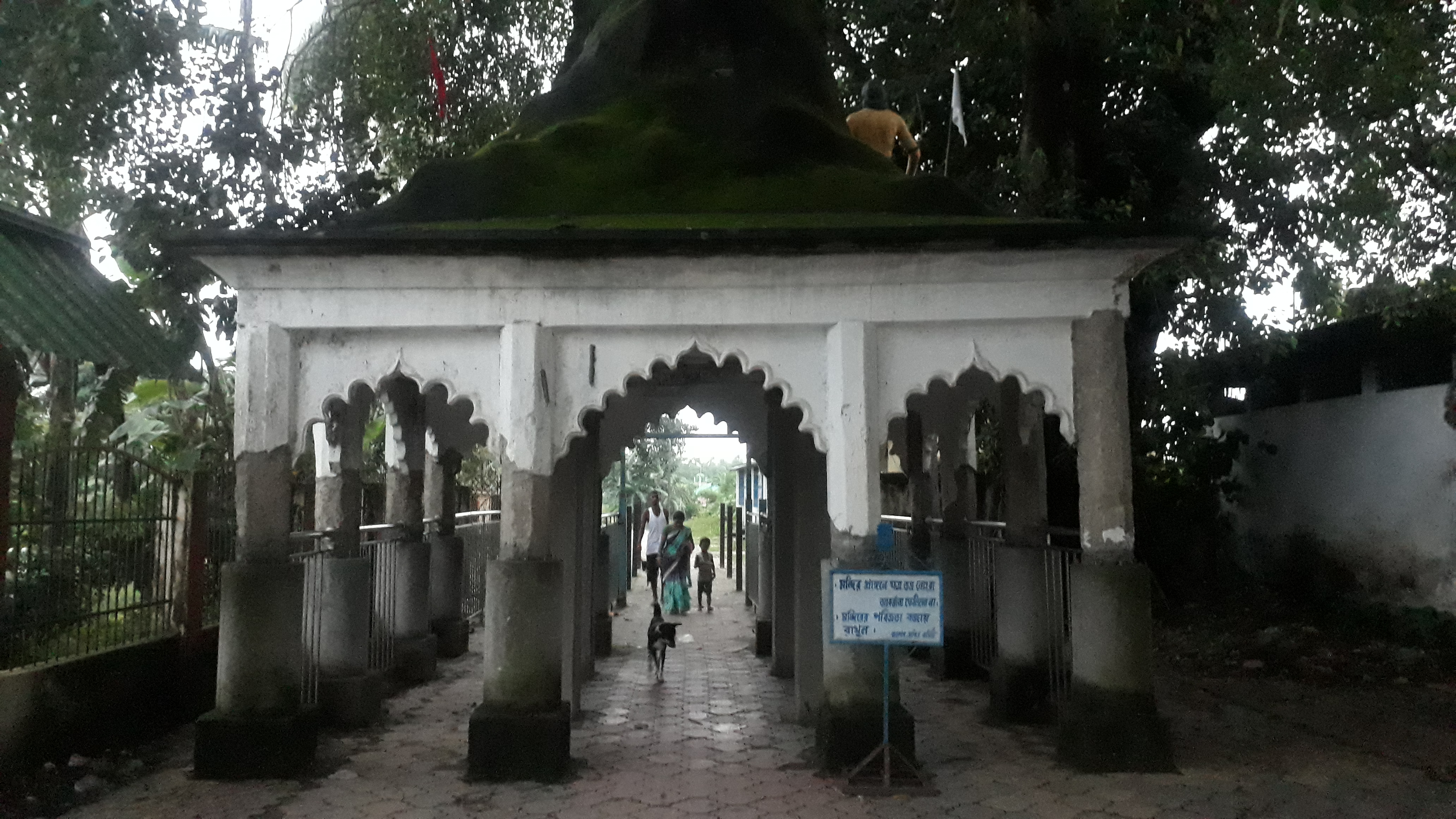

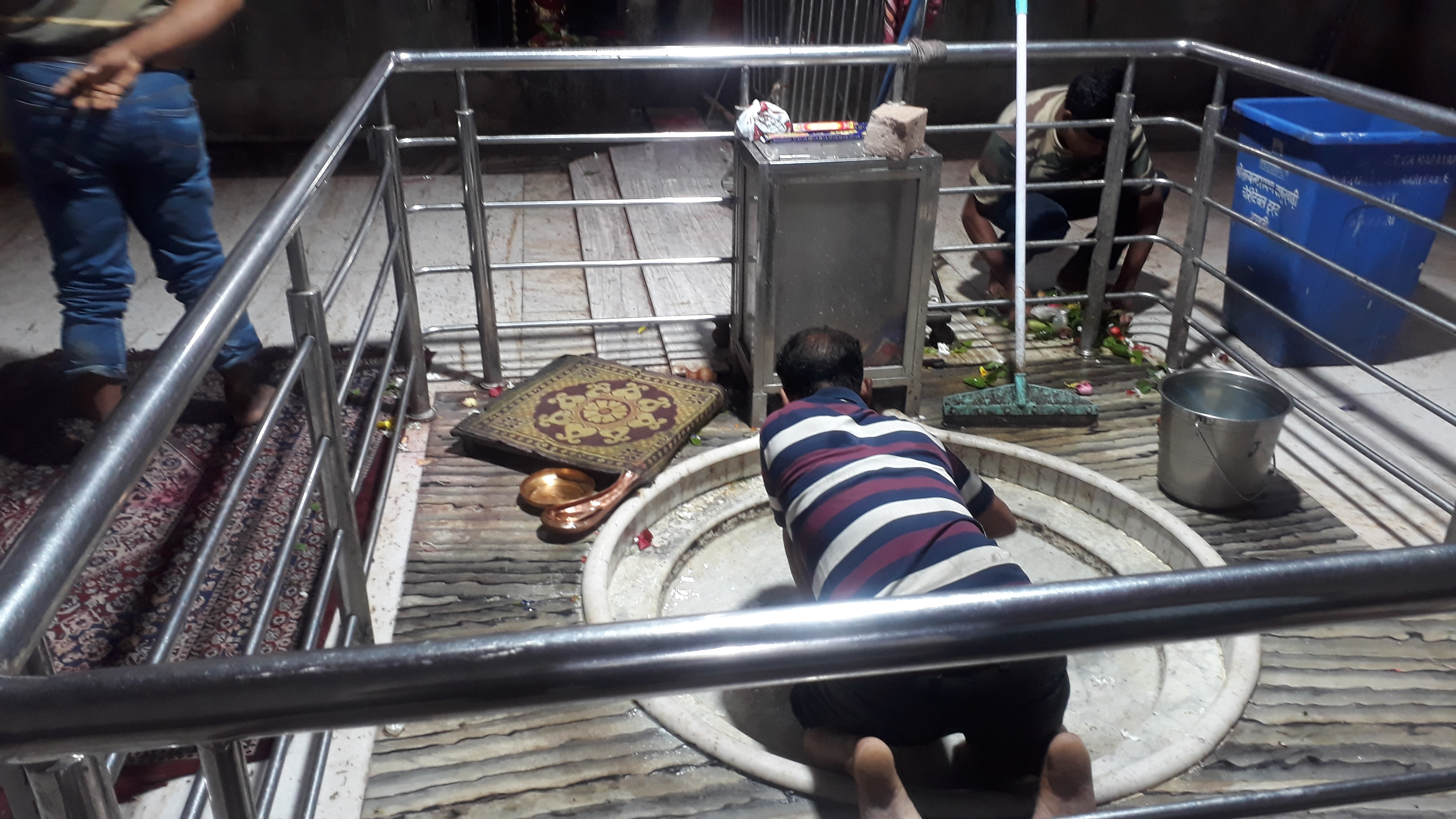
