= Maynaguri Municipality =

Type
- Type: Municipality

History
- Founded: 6 July 2021; 4 years ago

Leadership
- Chairman: Manoj Roy, AITC
- Vice Chairman: Somesh Sanyal, AITC

Structure
- Seats: 17
- Political groups: Government (17) AITC (16) IND (1)

Elections
- Last election: 2022
- Next election: 2027

Website
- www.maynagurimunicipality.in

Maynaguri Municipality is the civic body that governs Mainaguri town of Jalpaiguri district, West Bengal, India.

== Current members ==
Maynaguri Municipality has a total of 17 members or councillors, who are directly elected after a term of 5 years. The council is led by the Chairperson. The latest elections were held on 12 February 2022. The current chairman of Maynaguri Municipality is Manoj Roy of the Trinamool Congress. The current vice chairman is Somesh Sanyal Sarkar of the Trinamool Congress.

Chairperson: Manoj Roy
Deputy Chairperson: Somesh Sanyal
Ward No.	Name of Councillor	Party	Remarks
1	Rimpa Roy	Trinamool Congress	
2	Barnali Barai	Trinamool Congress	
3	Mousumi Sen	Trinamool Congress	
4	Somesh Sanyal	Trinamool Congress	
5	Ananta Deb Adhikari	Trinamool Congress	
6	Barun Ghosh	Trinamool Congress	
7	Rita Das	Trinamool Congress	
8	Produth Biswas	Trinamool Congress	
9	Gobinda Paul	Trinamool Congress	
10	Chandana Roy	Trinamool Congress	
11	Manoj Roy	Trinamool Congress	
12	Tuhin Kanti Choudhary	Independent	
13	Rina Biswas	Trinamool Congress	
14	Kalyan Saha	Trinamool Congress	
15	Amitabh Chakraborty	Trinamool Congress	
16	Lalita Roy	Trinamool Congress	
17	Supriya Das	Trinamool Congress	

== Chairperson List ==
- Manoj Roy - current
- Ananta Deb Adhikari
