= Jatileswar Temple =

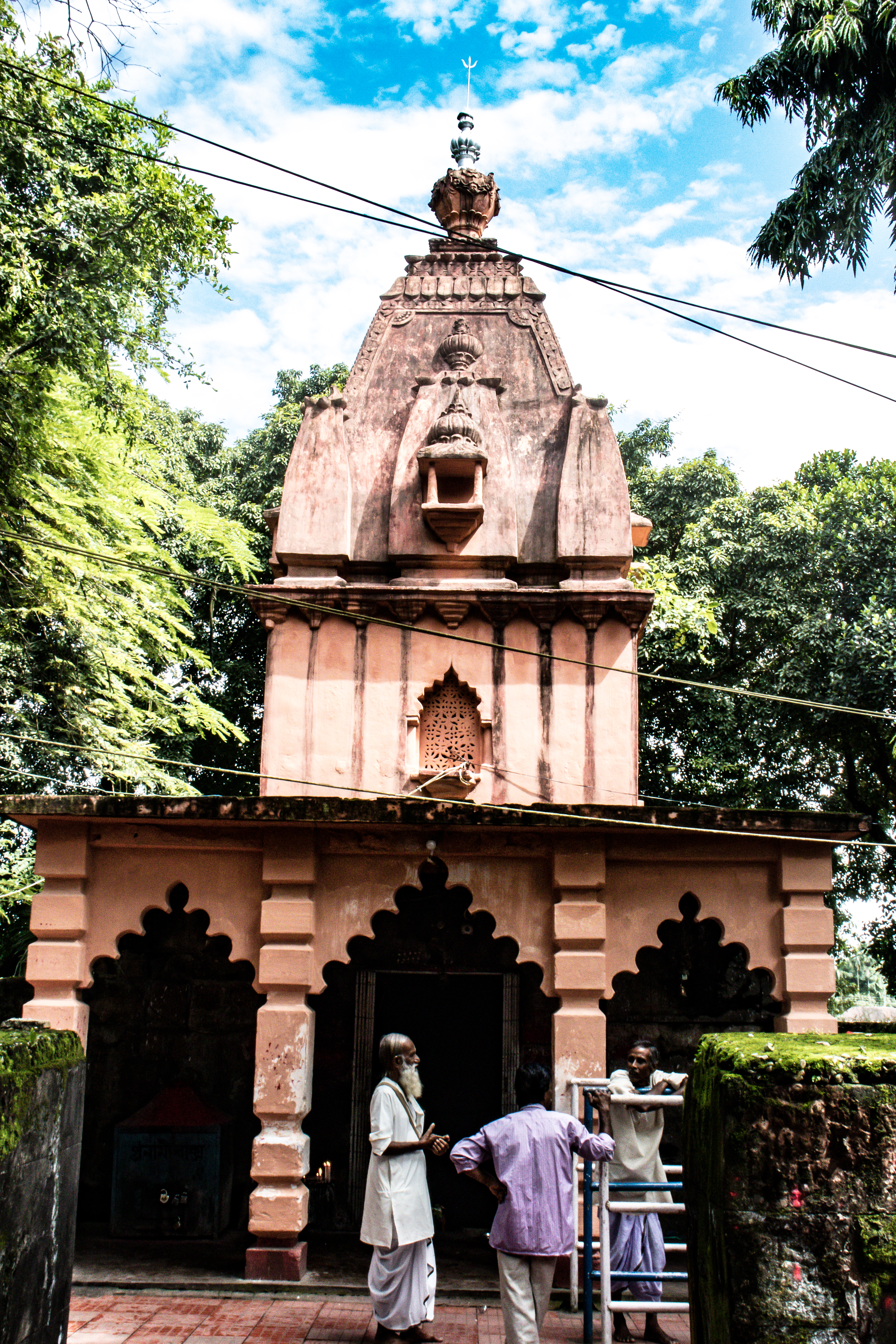

Religion
- Affiliation: Hinduism
- District: Jalpaiguri
- Deity: Shiva
- Festival: Maha Shivaratri

Location
- Location: Mainaguri
- State: West Bengal
- Country: India
- Interactive map of Jatileswar Temple

Architecture
- Creator: Gupta Rulers
- Established: 320 AD - 600 AD

Jatileswar Temple (Bengali: জটিলেশ্বর মন্দির) is a Hindu temple dedicated to Lord Shiva. The temple located in Maynaguri of the Jalpaiguri district in the Indian state of West Bengal.

== History ==
The temple of Purbba Dehar was built by the feudal chief of Gupta kingdom around 320 AD to 600 AD.

== Protection ==
It is under the protection of the Archaeological Survey of India. The government of West Bengal had declared the temple of Purbba Dehar as an archaeological site and the place now has been reserved under the State Protected Monuments.

== Tourism ==
The Jalpaiguri Sadar Subdivision administration is focusing on developing a spiritual tourism circuit, with Jatileswar Temple as a key highlight. Plans include enhancing infrastructure and registering tourist guides and vehicles to ensure visitor safety and transparency. Improvements are underway for the 12.5 km road from Bodaganj to Gazaldoba, linking to the Bhorer Alo tourist hub.
