= Minati Sen =

Indian politician

Member of parliament, Lok Sabha
- In office 1998–2009
- Preceded by: Jitendra Nath Das
- Succeeded by: Mahendra Kumar Roy
- Constituency: Jalpaiguri

Personal details
- Born: October 2, 1943 Dinajpur, Bangladesh
- Died: May 3, 2025 Jalpaiguri, West Bengal
- Party: CPI(M)
- Spouse: Ashish Kumar Sen
- Children: 2 sons Arup Darsan Sen, Abhishek Sen
- As of 17 September, 2006

Minati Sen (2 October 1943 – 3 May 2025) was a member of the 14th Lok Sabha of India. She represented the Jalpaiguri constituency of West Bengal and is a member of the Communist Party of India (Marxist) (CPI(M)) political party.

== Positions held ==
1998

Elected to 12th Lok Sabha

1998–1999

Member, Committee on External Affairs and its Sub-Committee-II

Member, Consultative Committee, Ministry of Human Resource Development

1999

Re-elected to 13th Lok Sabha (2nd term)

1999–2004

Member, Committee on External Affairs

2000–2004

Member, Consultative Committee, Ministry of Human Resource Development

2002–2004

Member, Committee on Empowerment of women

2004

Re-elected to 14th Lok Sabha (3rd term)

Member, Committee on Empowerment of Women

Member, Committee on Water Resources

Member, Consultative Committee on Social Justice and Empowerment

16 August 2006 onwards

Member, Committee on Empowerment of Women

== Social and Cultural Activities ==
Since college days, she actively participated in various cultural activities, such as theatre, debate and other co-curricular activities; organised blood donation camps, rehabilitation programmes and rendered much support to socially and economically deprived women through "Ganatantrik Mahila Samiti".
