= Pradip Kumar Barma =

Indian politician

- thumb

Member of the West Bengal Legislative Assembly
- In office 2 May 2021 – 3 May 2026
- Preceded by: Sukhbilas Barma
- Succeeded by: Ananta Deb Adhikari
- Constituency: Jalpaiguri

Personal details
- Party: AITC
- Education: Nil Ratan Sircar Medical College and Hospital
- Profession: Doctor gynecologist & Politician

Pradip Kumar Barma is an Indian politician from AITC. In May 2021, he was elected as the member of the West Bengal Legislative Assembly from Jalpaiguri.

== Career ==
Barma is from Jalpaiguri district. His father's name is Kalisankar Barma. He passed MBBS from Nil Ratan Sircar Medical College and Hospital, in 1981. He contested in 2021 West Bengal Legislative Assembly election from Jalpaiguri Vidhan Sabha and won the seat on 2 May 2021.
