= Rajganj Assembly constituency =

West Bengal Legislative Assembly constituency

Rajganj (SC)
- Constituency No. 18 for the West Bengal Legislative Assembly
- Interactive Map Outlining Rajganj (SC) Assembly Constituency

Constituency details
- Country: India
- Region: East India
- State: West Bengal
- District: Jalpaiguri
- Lok Sabha constituency: Jalpaiguri (SC)
- Established: 1967
- Total electors: 231,186
- Reservation: SC

Member of Legislative Assembly
- 18th West Bengal Legislative Assembly
- Incumbent Dinesh Sarkar
- Party: Bharatiya Janata Party
- Elected year: 2026

Most Successful parties from Rajganj (SC) assembly
1. Communist Party of India (Marxist) (7 times) (43.8%)
2. All India Trinamool Congress (4 times) (25.0%)
3. Indian National Congress (3 times) (18.8%)
4. Samyukta Socialist Party (1 time) (6.25%)
5. Bharatiya Janata Party (1 time) (6.25%)

Rajganj (SC) is an assembly constituency in Jalpaiguri district in the Indian state of West Bengal. It is reserved for scheduled castes.

== Overview ==
As per orders of the Delimitation Commission, No. 18 Rajganj Assembly constituency (SC) covers Binnaguri, Kukurjan, Majhiali, Mantadari, Panikauri, Sannyasikata, Sikarpur and Sukhani gram panchayats of Rajganj community development block, and Baropatia Nutanabos, Belakoba, Paharpur and Patkata gram panchayats of Jalpaiguri community development block.

Rajganj Assembly constituency is part of No. 3 Jalpaiguri (Lok Sabha constituency) (SC).

== Members of the Legislative Assembly ==
| Election | Name | Party Affiliation |
|---|---|---|
| 1967 | B.N.R.Hakim | Samyukta Socialist Party |
| 1969 | Kiran Chandra Roy | Indian National Congress |
| 1971 | Bhagwan Singh Roy | Indian National Congress |
| 1972 | Mrigendra Narayan Roy | Indian National Congress |
| 1977 | Dhirendra Nath Roy | Communist Party of India (Marxist) |
| 1982 | Dhirendra Nath Roy | Communist Party of India (Marxist) |
| 1987 | Dhirendra Nath Roy | Communist Party of India (Marxist) |
| 1991 | Jotindra Nath Roy | Communist Party of India (Marxist) |
| 1996 | Jotindra Nath Roy | Communist Party of India (Marxist) |
| 2001 | Jotindra Nath Roy | Communist Party of India (Marxist) |
| 2006 | Mahendra Kumar Roy | Communist Party of India (Marxist) |
| **2009** | Khageswar Roy | All India Trinamool Congress |
| 2011 | Khageswar Roy | All India Trinamool Congress |
| 2016 | Khageswar Roy | All India Trinamool Congress |
| 2021 | Khageswar Roy | All India Trinamool Congress |
| 2026 | Dinesh Sarkar | Bharatiya Janata Party |

Bolded year= Bye Election

== Election results ==
=== 2026 ===
In the 2026 West Bengal Legislative Assembly election, Dinesh Sarkar of BJP defeated his nearest rival Swapna Barman of TMC by 21,477 votes. Former MLA Khageswar Roy publicly claimed he had "lost to money," alleging that someone had paid to have his name dropped from the candidate list. He also criticized the choice of Swapna Barman, stating she had "never worked for the TMC" and give guarantee the party would lose the seat.

2026 West Bengal Legislative Assembly election: Rajganj (SC)
| Party | Candidate | Votes | % | ±% |
|---|---|---|---|---|
| **BJP** | **Dinesh Sarkar** | **114,657** | **51.1** | **▲9.91** |
| AITC | Swapna Barman | 93,180 | 41.53 | ▼6.97 |
| CPI(M) | Kharendra Nath Roy | 6,371 | 2.84 | ▼2.77 |
| IND | Sanjib Roy | 1,594 | 0.71 | New entry |
| INC | Tushar Kanti Roy | 1,460 | 0.65 | New entry |
| BSP | Radha Mandal | 1,232 | 0.55 | ▼0.15 |
| SUCI(C) | Ananta Kumar Roy | 1,054 | 0.47 | ▼0.27 |
| IND | Prakash Chandra Roy | 999 | 0.45 | New entry |
| IND | Swapna Barman | 932 | 0.42 | New entry |
| IND | Bapi Roy | 625 | 0.28 | New entry |
| IND | Kunal Roy | 338 | 0.15 | New entry |
| AMB | Harendranath Roy | 308 | 0.14 | ▼0.25 |
| KPP(U) | Jagadish Chandra Roy | 307 | 0.14 | ▼0.72 |
| NOTA | Nota | 1,322 | 0.59 | ▼0.88 |
| Majority | | 21,477 | 9.87 | ▲2.26 |
| Turnout | | 224,379 | 97.06 | ▲8.69 |
| Registered electors | | 231,186 | | ▼5.31 |
| BJP **gain** from AITC | | Swing | 8.44 | |

=== 2021 ===
2021 West Bengal Legislative Assembly election: Rajganj
| Party | Candidate | Votes | % | ±% |
|---|---|---|---|---|
| **AITC** | **Khageswar Roy** | **104,641** | **48.5** | |
| BJP | Supen Roy | 88,868 | 41.19 | |
| CPI(M) | Ratan Ray | 12,108 | 5.61 | |
| NOTA | None of the above | 3,175 | 1.47 | |
| Majority | | 15,773 | 7.31 | |
| Turnout | | 215,755 | 88.37 | |

=== 2011 ===
In the 2011 elections, Khageshwar Roy of Trinamool Congress defeated his nearest rival Amulya Chandra Roy of CPI(M).

West Bengal assembly elections, 2011: Rajganj (SC) constituency
| Party | Candidate | Votes | % | ±% |
|---|---|---|---|---|
| AITC | Khageswar Roy | 74,546 | 46.64 | |
| CPI(M) | Amulya Chandra Roy | 67,526 | 42.25 | |
| BJP | Supen Roy | 8,038 | 5.03 | |
| JMM | Paresh Chandra Roy | 7,104 | 4.44 | |
| BSP | Santi Kishore Barari | 2,624 | | |
| Turnout | | 159,838 | 89.61 | |
| AITC **hold** | | Swing | | |

=== 2009 ===
In the 2009 bye-elections, caused by the election of sitting MLA Mahendra Kumar Roy from Jalpaiguri (Lok Sabha constituency), Khageswar Roy of Trinamool Congress won the Rajganj (SC) seat.

In the 2006 state assembly elections, Mahendra Kumar Roy of CPI(M) won the Rajganj (SC) assembly seat defeating his nearest rival Khageswar Roy of Trinamool Congress. Contests in most years were multi cornered but only winners and runners are being mentioned. Jotindra Nath Roy of CPI(M) defeated Khageswar Roy of Trinamool Congress in 2001, and Ajit Kumar Roy of Congress in 1996 and 1991. Dhirendra Nath Roy of CPI(M) defeated Birendra Das of Congress in 1987, Jiban Kumar Ray of Congress in 1982 and Monomohan Roy of Janata Party in 1977.

=== 1972 ===
Mrigendra Narayan Roy of Congress won in 1972. Bhagwan Singh Roy of Congress won in 1971. Kiran Chandra Roy of Congress won in 1969. B.N.R.Hakim of SSP won in 1967.
