= Somra Lakra =

Indian politician

Member of the West Bengal Legislative Assembly
- In office 2001–2011
- Preceded by: Jagannath Oraon
- Succeeded by: Bulu Chik Baraik
- Constituency: Mal

Personal details
- Party: CPIM
- Profession: Politician

Somra Lakra is an Indian politician from West Bengal. He was elected two times as a Member of the Legislative Assembly from Mal, as a member of the CPIM, in the 2001 and 2006 elections.
