= Jitendra Nath Das =

Indian politician

Member of Parliament, Lok Sabha
- In office 1991-1998
- Preceded by: Manik Sanyal
- Succeeded by: Minati Sen
- Constituency: Jalpaiguri, West Bengal

Personal details
- Born: 30 November 1938 Khagchhara, Pabna District, Bengal Presidency, British India
- Party: CPI(M)
- Spouse: Minati Das

Jitendra Nath Das was an Indian politician belonging to the Communist Party of India (Marxist). He was elected to the Lok Sabha, lower house of the Parliament of India from Jalpaiguri in 1991 and 1996.
