= N. R. Ghosh =

Indian politician

Nalini Ranjan Ghosh

Member of Parliament, Lok Sabha
- In office 1962-1967
- Succeeded by: Birendra Nath Katham
- Constituency: Jalpaiguri

Personal details
- Party: Indian National Congress

Nalini Ranjan Ghosh (Bengali: নলিনী রঞ্জন ঘোষ) was an Indian politician. In the 1958 by-election, he was elected to the Lok Sabha from the Cooch Behar constituency. In 1962, he was elected to the Lok Sabha from the Jalpaiguri constituency. Ghosh was a member of the Indian National Congress party.
