= Khagendra Nath Dasgupta =

Indian politician

Cabinet Minister, Government of West Bengal
- In office 1952-1967

Member of West Bengal Legislative Assembly
- In office 1951–1969
- Succeeded by: Naresh Chandra Chakraborty
- Constituency: Jalpaiguri

Member of Parliament, Lok Sabha
- In office 1977–1980
- Preceded by: Tuna Oraon
- Succeeded by: Subodh Sen
- Constituency: Jalpaiguri

Personal details
- Born: 6 July 1898 Jalpaiguri, Bengal Presidency, British India (now Jalpaiguri, West Bengal, India)
- Died: 15 June 1985 (aged 86)
- Party: Indian National Congress; Janata Party
- Spouse: Aruna Dasgupta
- Children: 3
- Education: Rajshahi College

Khagendra Nath Dasgupta was an independence activist, minister in the West Bengal government, Leader of the Opposition in West Bengal Vidhan Sabha and Member of the Lok Sabha.

== Early life ==
Khagendra Nath Dasgupta was born on 6 July 1898 at Jalpaiguri to Ishan Chandra Dasgupta. He graduated from Rajshahi College. He joined a revolutionary party early in life and was a member of it from 1913 to 1920. After the special session of the Congress in Kolkata, he joined the non-cooperation movement in 1920. He organised the Congress Party in Jalpiaguri and was sent to jail several times.

He was elected Commissioner of Japaiguri Municipality in 1924 and thrice thereafter. In the 1937 Bengal elections, Khagendra Nath Dasgupta won as a Congress candidate from the Jalpaiguri-cum-Siliguri constituency.

== Post-Independence ==
He was elected to the West Bengal Vidhan Sabha from Jalpaiguri in 1951, 1957, 1962 and 1967.

He was Minister, Public Works and Buildings, in 1952, Public Works and Building and Housing in 1957, Public Works in 1962, and for a short duration in 1968. He was leader of the opposition during United Front regime in 1967.

He won the election to the 6th Lok Sabha as a Janata Party candidate (recorded as independent in election records) in 1977. He retired from active politics in 1980. He died on 15 June 1985.
