= Subodh Sen =

Indian politician

Member of Parliament, Lok Sabha
- In office 1980–1984
- Preceded by: Khagendra Nath Dasgupta
- Succeeded by: Manik Sanyal
- Constituency: Jalpaiguri, West Bengal

Personal details
- Born: 29 December 1917 Faridpur District, Bengal Presidency, British India
- Died: 7 October 1989 (aged 72)
- Party: CPI(M)

Subodh Sen (1917–1989) was an Indian politician belonging to the Communist Party of India (Marxist). His parents were Nirendra Binod Sen and Labbanya Sen. He was elected to the Lok Sabha, lower house of the Parliament of India from Jalpaiguri in 1980.
