= Mal Assembly constituency =

Mal (ST)
- Constituency No. 20 for the West Bengal Legislative Assembly
- Interactive Map Outlining Mal (ST) Assembly Constituency

Constituency details
- Country: India
- Region: East India
- State: West Bengal
- District: Jalpaiguri
- Lok Sabha constituency: Jalpaiguri (SC)
- Established: 1951
- Total electors: 238,092
- Reservation: ST

Member of Legislative Assembly
- 18th West Bengal Legislative Assembly
- Incumbent Sukra Munda
- Party: Bharatiya Janata Party
- Elected year: 2026

Most Successful parties from Mal (ST) assembly
1. Communist Party of India (Marxist) (8 times) (42.2%)
2. Indian National Congress (7 times) (36.8%)
3. All India Trinamool Congress (2 times) (10.5%)
4. Communist Party of India (1 time) (5.26%)
5. Bharatiya Janata Party (1 time) (5.26%)

Mal (ST) is a West Bengal Legislative Assembly constituency in Jalpaiguri district in the Indian state of West Bengal. It is reserved for scheduled tribes.

== Overview ==
As per orders of the Delimitation Commission, No. 20 Mal Assembly constituency covers Mal municipality and Mal community development block,

Mal Assembly constituency is part of No. 3 Jalpaiguri (Lok Sabha constituency) (SC).

== Members of the Legislative Assembly ==
Year	Member	Party
1951	Sasadhar Kar	Indian National Congress
1951	Munda Antoni Topno	Indian National Congress
1957	Mangru Bhagat	Communist Party of India
1957	Budhu Bhagat	Indian National Congress
1962	Barendra Krishna Bhowmick	Indian National Congress
1967	Antony Topno	Indian National Congress
1969	Antony Topno	Indian National Congress
1971	Antony Topno	Indian National Congress
1972	Antony Topno	Indian National Congress
1977	Mohanlal Oraon	Communist Party of India (Marxist)
1982	Mohanlal Oraon	Communist Party of India (Marxist)
1987	Mohanlal Oraon	Communist Party of India (Marxist)
1991	Jagannath Oraon	Communist Party of India (Marxist)
1996	Jagannath Oraon	Communist Party of India (Marxist)
2001	Somra Lakra	Communist Party of India (Marxist)
2006	Somra Lakra	Communist Party of India (Marxist)
2011	Bulu Chik Baraik	Communist Party of India (Marxist)
2016	Bulu Chik Baraik	All India Trinamool Congress
2021	Bulu Chik Baraik	All India Trinamool Congress
2026	Sukra Munda	Bharatiya Janata Party

== Election results ==
Vote share of Winning candidates
2026	49.94%
2021	46.46%
2016	44.28%
2011	39.69%
2006	48.09%
2001	51.50%
1996	54.79%
1991	55.59%
1987	57.09%
1982	64.33%
1977	42.97%
1972	61.81%
1971	32.65%
1969	56.96%
1967	54.34%
1962	52.08%
1957 (Seat-1)	22.92%
1957 (Seat-2)	21.70%
1952 (Seat-1)	28.61%
1952 (Seat-2)	28.15%

=== 2026 ===
2026 West Bengal Legislative Assembly election: Mal (ST)
Party	Candidate	Votes	%	±%
BJP	Sukra Munda	112,095	49.94	▲6.04
AITC	Bulu Chik Baraik	96,603	43.04	▼3.42
CPI(M)	Manu Oraon	5,831	2.6	▼2.52
INC	Rakesh Kujur	2,886	1.29	▼35.7
IND	Chandan Lohara	1,490	0.66	New entry
SUCI(C)	Shibnath Oraon	1,111	0.49	▼0.92
IND	Manju Kerketta (Baraik)	818	0.36	New entry
IND	Dipika Sabar	600	0.27	New entry
NOTA	Nota	3,019	1.35	▼0.85
Majority		15,492	6.9	▲4.34
Turnout		224,453	94.27	▲10.83
Registered electors		238,092		▼6.84
BJP gain from AITC		Swing	4.73	

=== 2021 ===
2021 West Bengal Legislative Assembly election: Mal (ST)
Party	Candidate	Votes	%	±%
AITC	Bulu Chik Baraik	99,086	46.46	▲2.18
BJP	Mahesh Bagey	93,621	43.90	▲28.57
CPI(M)	Manu Oraon	10,929	5.12	▼29.53
NOTA	None of the above	4,699	2.20	▼0.03
SUCI(C)	Gita Oraon	3,008	1.41	▲0.08
IND	Bablu Majhi	1,912	0.90	
Majority		5,465	2.56	▼7.07
Turnout		213,255	83.44	▼0.82
AITC hold		Swing		

=== 2016 ===
2016 West Bengal Legislative Assembly election: Mal (ST)
Party	Candidate	Votes	%	±%
AITC	Bulu Chik Baraik	84,877	44.28	
CPI(M)	Augustus Kerketta	66,415	34.65	▼5.04
BJP	Mahesh Bage	29,380	15.33	▲12.13
NOTA	None of the above	4,273	2.23	
BSP	Anjali Malo	4,168	2.17	▼0.37
SUCI(C)	Jyotish Minj	2,553	1.33	
Majority		18,462	9.63	▲6.93
Turnout		191,666	84.26	▼1.39
AITC gain from CPI(M)		Swing		

=== 2011 ===
2011 West Bengal Legislative Assembly election: Mal (ST)
Party	Candidate	Votes	%	±%
CPI(M)	Bulu Chik Baraik	62,037	39.69	▼8.40
INC	Hiraman Oraon	57,821	36.99	▼2.82
JMM	Ganga Beck	21,756	13.92	
IND	Shibani Oraon	5,724	3.66	
BJP	Baliram Ekka	5,006	3.20	
BSP	Anjali Malo	3,976	2.54	
Majority		4,216	2.70	▼5.58
Turnout		156,320	85.65	
CPI(M) hold		Swing		

=== 2006 ===
2006 West Bengal Legislative Assembly election: Mal (ST)
Party	Candidate	Votes	%	±%
CPI(M)	Somra Lakra	56,173	48.09	▼3.41
INC	Turi Kol Munda	46,498	39.81	▲0.66
AITC	Rabin Tirkey	6,842	5.86	
IND	Rita Kandulna (Munda)	6,773	5.80	
Majority		9,675	8.28	▼4.07
Turnout		116,801		
CPI(M) hold		Swing		

=== 2001 ===
2001 West Bengal Legislative Assembly election: Mal (ST)
Party	Candidate	Votes	%	±%
CPI(M)	Somra Lakra	53,683	51.50	▼3.29
INC	Shyam Bhagat	40,811	39.15	▼1.16
BJP	Kapil Kumar Tamba	9,752	9.35	▲6.03
Majority		12,872	12.35	▼2.13
Turnout		104,306	73.07	▼11.44
CPI(M) hold		Swing		

=== 1996 ===
1996 West Bengal Legislative Assembly election: Mal (ST)
Party	Candidate	Votes	%	±%
CPI(M)	Jagannath Oraon	60,559	54.79	▼0.80
INC	Turi Kule Munda	44,550	40.31	▲4.62
BJP	Phanindra Lal Mutsuddy	3,672	3.32	▼2.99
IND	Mahabir Orao	1,743	1.58	
Majority		16,009	14.48	▼5.42
Turnout		115,504	84.51	▲10.48
CPI(M) hold		Swing		

=== 1991 ===
1991 West Bengal Legislative Assembly election: Mal (ST)
Party	Candidate	Votes	%	±%
CPI(M)	Jagannath Oraon	51,351	55.59	▼1.50
INC	Shyam Bhagat	32,968	35.69	▲1.25
BJP	Sukman Tirkey	5,828	6.31	
IND	Subrata Oraon	1,898	2.05	
IND	Soma Uraon	326	0.35	
Majority		18,383	19.90	▼2.75
Turnout		96,449	74.03	▲7.59
CPI(M) hold		Swing		

=== 1987 ===
1987 West Bengal Legislative Assembly election: Mal (ST)
Party	Candidate	Votes	%	±%
CPI(M)	Mohanlal Oraon	39,564	57.09	▼7.24
INC	Aao Kalandi	23,869	34.44	▼1.23
IND	Birya Lakra	2,866	4.14	
IND	Somra Oraon	2,224	3.21	
IND	Sukman Tirkey	578	0.83	
IND	Arjun Oraon	201	0.29	
Majority		15,695	22.65	▼6.01
Turnout		72,642	66.44	▼8.95
CPI(M) hold		Swing		

=== 1982 ===
1982 West Bengal Legislative Assembly election: Mal (ST)
Party	Candidate	Votes	%	±%
CPI(M)	Mohanlal Oraon	43,409	64.33	▲21.36
INC	Sukman Tirkey	24,071	35.67	▲12.27
Majority		19,338	28.66	▲9.09
Turnout		71,449	75.39	▲19.40
CPI(M) hold		Swing		

=== 1977 ===
1977 West Bengal Legislative Assembly election: Mal (ST)
Party	Candidate	Votes	%	±%
CPI(M)	Mohan Lal Oraon	17,099	42.97	▲4.78
INC	Antani Topno	9,314	23.40	▼38.41
JP	Birendra Nath Katham	6,530	16.41	
CPI	Prem Oraon	4,816	12.10	
IND	Gyan Prokas Tete	2,038	5.12	
Majority		7,785	19.57	▼4.05
Turnout		41,763	55.99	▼3.31
CPI(M) gain from INC		Swing		

=== 1972 ===
1972 West Bengal Legislative Assembly election: Mal (ST)
Party	Candidate	Votes	%	±%
INC	Antoni Topno	25,939	61.81	▲29.16
CPI(M)	Jagga Nath Oraon	16,030	38.19	▲14.67
Majority		9,909	23.62	▲14.49
Turnout		44,552	59.30	▼2.42
INC hold		Swing		

=== 1971 ===
1971 West Bengal Legislative Assembly election: Mal (ST)
Party	Candidate	Votes	%	±%
INC	Antoni Toppno	13,383	32.65	▼24.31
CPI(M)	Jagarnath Oraon	9,640	23.52	
CPI	Arjun Oraon	9,006	21.97	▼8.40
PSP	Guruchanran Oraon	3,349	8.17	▼2.69
RSP	Elcio Minz	3,068	7.49	
IND	Aplu Oraon	1,687	4.12	
INC(O)	Sukhoo Bhagat	854	2.08	
Majority		3,743	9.13	▼17.46
Turnout		44,894	61.72	▲0.57
INC hold		Swing		

=== 1969 ===
1969 West Bengal Legislative Assembly election: Mal (ST)
Party	Candidate	Votes	%	±%
INC	Antoni Topno	22,706	56.96	▲2.62
CPI	Arjun Oraon	12,105	30.37	▲4.30
PSP	Guru Charan Oraon	4,330	10.86	▼8.73
LKD	Sukhoo Bhagat	400	1.00	
NDF	Tejaram Bhagat	320	0.80	
Majority		10,601	26.59	▼1.68
Turnout		42,089	61.15	▼2.59
INC hold		Swing		

=== 1967 ===
1967 West Bengal Legislative Assembly election: Mal (ST)
Party	Candidate	Votes	%	±%
INC	A. Topna	22,095	54.34	▲2.26
CPI	A. Oraon	10,600	26.07	▼0.25
PSP	M. Bhakat	7,965	19.59	▼2.01
Majority		11,495	28.27	▲2.51
Turnout		43,976	63.74	▲6.18
INC hold		Swing		

=== 1962 ===
1962 West Bengal Legislative Assembly election: Mal
Party	Candidate	Votes	%	±%
INC	Barendra Krishna Bhowmik	18,528	52.08	
CPI	Debaprosad Ghose	9,364	26.32	
PSP	Ghanashyam Misra	7,683	21.60	
Majority		9,164	25.76	
Turnout		38,336	57.56	
INC win (new seat)				

=== 1957 ===
1957 West Bengal Legislative Assembly election: Mal (ST)
Party	Candidate	Votes	%	±%
INC	Budhu Bhagat	23,424	22.92	
CPI	Mangru Bhagat	22,177	21.70	
PSP	Ghanashyam Misra	21,728	21.26	
INC	Sasadhar Kar	20,215	19.78	
IND	Birendra Nath Katham	8,482	8.30	
IND	Joynam Munda	3,505	3.43	
IND	Chandra Sekhar Chowdhuri	2,654	2.60	
Majority		1,247	1.22	
Turnout		102,185	100.55	
INC gain from CPI		Swing		
INC hold		Swing		

=== 1952 ===
1952 West Bengal Legislative Assembly election: Western Duars
Party	Candidate	Votes	%	±%
INC	Munda Antoni Topno	17,111	28.61	
INC	Sasadhar Kar	16,836	28.15	
Socialist	Ganashyam Misra	7,938	13.27	
KMPP	Devendra Mohan Sarkar	6,652	11.12	
Socialist	Jainu	6,398	10.70	
KMPP	Uraon Sukra Bhagat	4,878	8.16	
Majority		275	0.46	
Turnout		59,813	67.67	
INC win (new seat)				
