= Mahendra Kumar Roy =

Indian politician

Member of the Indian Parliament for Jalpaiguri
- In office 2009–2014
- Preceded by: Minati Sen
- Succeeded by: Bijoy Chandra Barman

MLA
- In office 2006–2009
- Preceded by: Jotindra Nath Roy
- Succeeded by: Khageswar Roy
- Constituency: Rajganj

Personal details
- Born: 31 December 1955 (age 70)
- Party: CPI(M)
- Spouse: Diba Roy
- Profession: School Teacher

Mahendra Kumar Roy (born 31 December 1955) was a member of the 15th Lok Sabha. He was elected on a CPI(M) ticket from the Jalpaiguri Lok Sabha constituency.

The son of the late Harendra Kumar Roy and the late Nanibala Roy, he was born at Goriapara village in Jalpaiguri district. He has a B.A. and B.Ed. from A.C. College and A.C. Training College, Jalpaiguri.

He started his political activities at the village level. He was in the gram panchayat during 1978–1988, was a member of the Panchyat Samiti 1993–1998, and a member of Jalpaiguri Zila Parishad 1998–2003. He was elected to the West Bengal assembly from the Rajganj Vidhan Sabha constituency in 2006.
