= Manik Sanyal =

Indian politician

Member of Parliament, Lok Sabha
- In office 1984-1991
- Preceded by: Subodh Sen
- Succeeded by: Jitendra Nath Das
- Constituency: Jalpaiguri, West Bengal

Personal details
- Born: 6 December 1935 Jalpaiguri, Bengal Presidency, British India
- Died: 28 July 2017 (aged 81)
- Party: CPI(M)
- Spouse: Ranu Sanyal
- Children: Jaydip Sanyal
- Parent: Charu Chandra Sanyal (father)

Manik Sanyal (b. 1935 - d. 2017) was an Indian politician belonging to the Communist Party of India (Marxist). He was elected to the Lok Sabha, lower house of the Parliament of India, from Jalpaiguri in 1984 and 1989.
