= Bulu Chik Baraik =

Indian politician

Minister Of State (Independent Charge) Government of West Bengal
- In office 2021–2026
- Governor: Jagdeep Dhankhar; La. Ganesan; C. V. Ananda Bose
- Chief Minister: Mamata Banerjee
- Department: •Backward Classes Welfare •Tribal Development

Member of West Bengal Legislative assembly
- In office 13 May 2011 – 5 May 2026
- Preceded by: Somra Lakra
- Succeeded by: Sukra Munda
- Constituency: Mal

Personal details
- Party: All India Trinamool Congress
- Other political affiliations: CPI(M) (before 2016)
- Parent: Firu Chik Baraik (father)
- Occupation: Staff in Tea Garden, Politician
- As of 29 November 2019

Bulu Chik Baraik is an Indian politician and West Bengal Legislative Assembly member from Mal. He was elected as member of state legislative assembly in 2016 as All India Trinamool Congress Candidate. In 2011, he was elected as member of state legislative assembly as Communist Party of India (Marxist) Candidate.

He was appointed the Minister of State (Independent Charge), Government of West Bengal for the Backward Classes Welfare Department and Tribal Department under the Third Banerjee Ministry.

== Early life ==
He was a worker at Rungamatee Tea Estate in Jalpaiguri district. His father was Firu Chik Baraik.

== Career ==
In 2011, he won election of Mal Assembly as a Communist Party of India (Marxist) candidate. In 2016, he won the election as a Trinamool Congress Candidate. He was appointed Minister of State (Independent charge) of Backward Class Welfare and Tribal development.
