= Bachchamohan Roy =

Indian politician

Member of the West Bengal Legislative Assembly
- In office 1996–2011
- Preceded by: Nityananda Adhikari
- Succeeded by: Ananta Deb Adhikari
- Constituency: Mainaguri

Personal details
- Party: RSP
- Profession: Politician

Bachchamohan Roy was an Indian politician from West Bengal. He was elected as a Member of the Legislative Assembly in 1996, 2001 and 2006 from Mainaguri constituency, as a member of the Revolutionary Socialist Party (India).
