= Khageswar Roy =

Indian politician

Member of the West Bengal Legislative Assembly
- In office 2009 – 4 May 2026
- Preceded by: Mahendra Kumar Roy
- Succeeded by: Dinesh Sarkar
- Constituency: Rajganj

Personal details
- Party: All India Trinamool Congress
- Profession: Politician

Khageswar Roy is an Indian politician from Trinamool Congress and also founding member with Kalyan Chakravarti, Kalyan Hor, Mridul Ghoshwami, Baban Paul, Purna prava Barman, and others in Jalpaiguri district. He has served as a member of the West Bengal Legislative Assembly from Rajganj from 2009 to 4 May 2026. He also served as Chairman of Jalpaiguri district All India Trinamool Congress until 2022. After that Mahua Gope succeeded as a new President of Jalpaiguri District TMC Unit.

== Career ==
Roy is from Rajganj, Jalpaiguri district. His father's name is Ramkamal Roy. He passed Higher Secondary Education from West Bengal Board of Secondary Education in 1972 from Belakoba High School. He contested 2021 West Bengal Legislative Assembly election from Rajganj Vidhan Sabha and won the seat on 2 May 2021.
