= Mainaguri =

Maynaguri
- Town
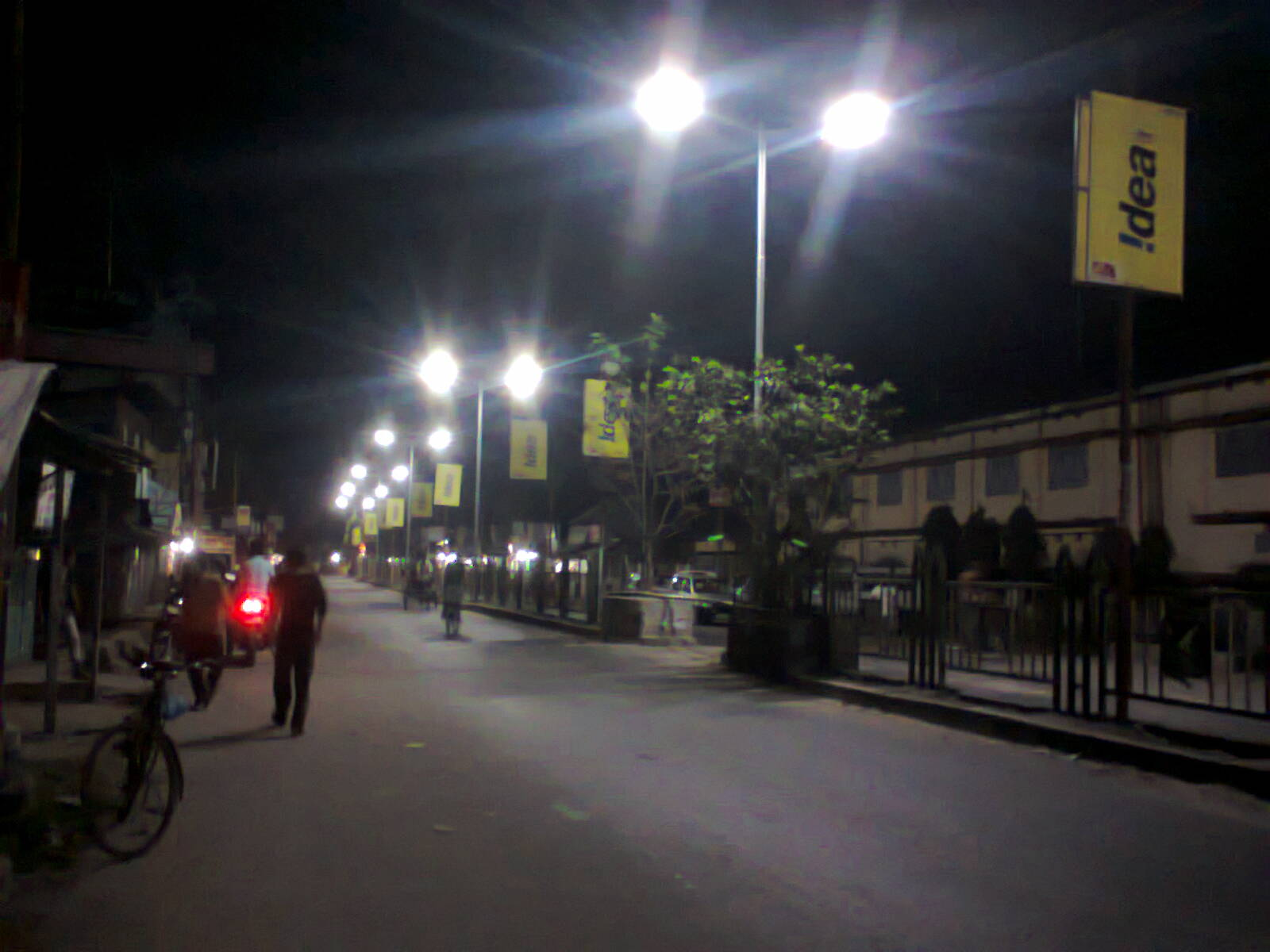
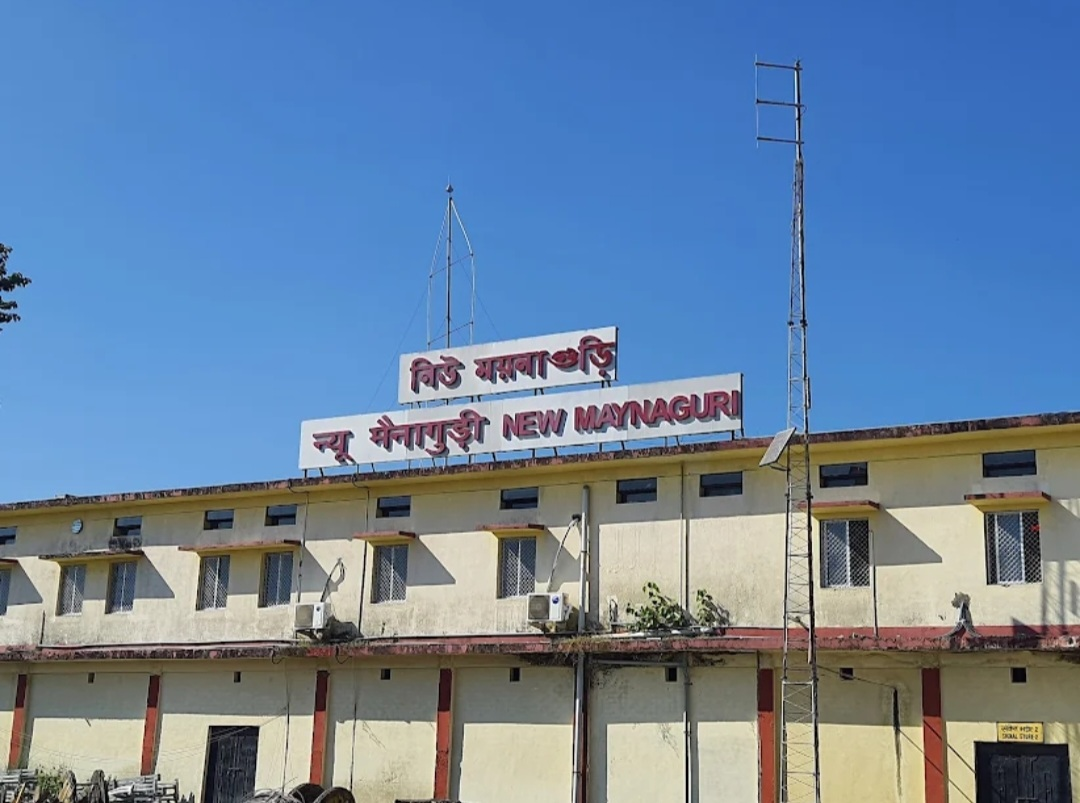
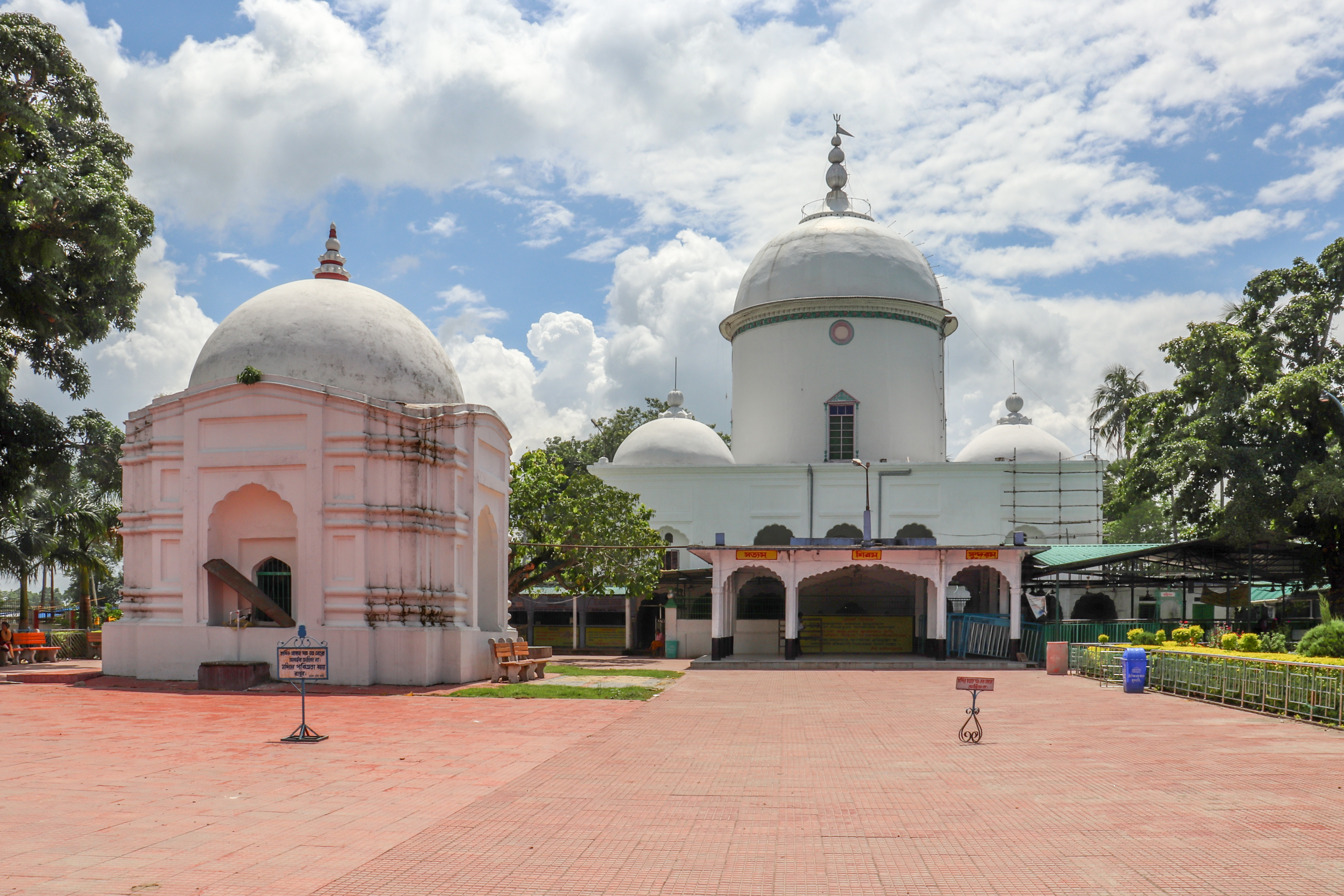
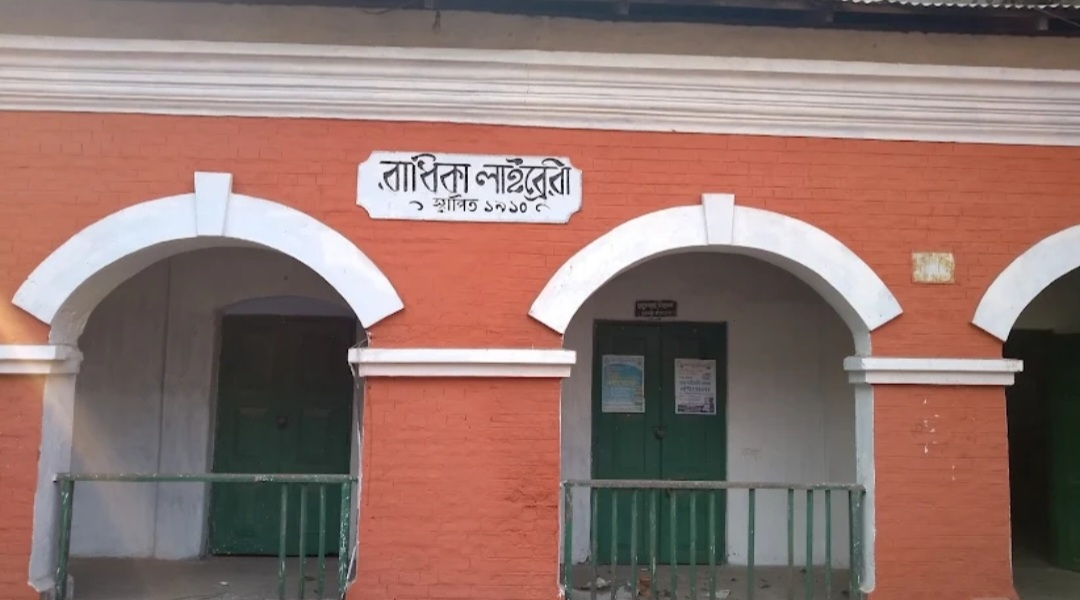
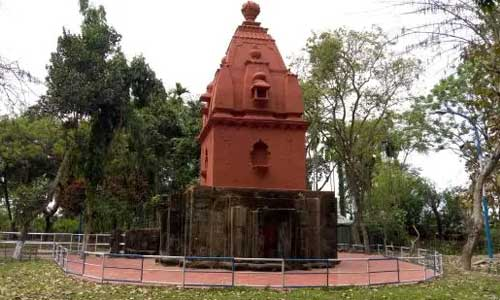
- Clockwise from top: Night view of the town, Jalpesh Temple, Jatileswar Temple, Radhika Library, New Maynaguri railway station
- Nickname: Gateway of Dooars
- Location in West Bengal, India Maynaguri (India) Maynaguri (Asia)
- Coordinates: 26°33′57″N 88°49′17″E
- Country: India
- State: West Bengal
- District: Jalpaiguri
- Named for: Myna

Government
  - Type: Municipality
  - Body: Maynaguri Municipality
  - Chairman: Manoj Roy
  - Vice Chairman: Somesh Sanyal (Jhulan)

Area
  - Total: 12.38 km^{2} (4.78 sq mi)
- Elevation: 84 m (276 ft)

Population (2011)
  - Total: 45,045
  - Density: 3,639/km^{2} (9,424/sq mi)

Languages
  - Official: Bengali
  - Additional official: English
- Time zone: UTC+5:30 (IST)
- PIN: 735224
- Lok Sabha constituency: Jalpaiguri
- Vidhan Sabha constituency: Maynaguri
- Website: www.maynagurimunicipality.in

Mainaguri (also spelled Maynaguri) is a town and a municipality in the Jalpaiguri Sadar subdivision of the Jalpaiguri district in the state of West Bengal, India. The town is located on the banks of the Jarda River. It is known as the "Gateway of the Dooars" and is a regionally significant tourist destination for Jalpesh Temple of Lord Shiva and nearby Gorumara National Park.

== Civic administration ==
Mainaguri is mainly governed by Maynaguri Municipality. Mainaguri covers 17 wards spread across Madhabdanga-I and Maynaguri panchayats and parts of Khagrabari-I and Domohoni-I panchayats of Maynaguri CD block.

=== Police station ===
Mainaguri police has jurisdiction over Mainaguri town and Maynaguri CD block.

=== CD block HQ ===
Headquarters of Maynaguri CD block is at Mainaguri.

== Culture ==
=== Festivals ===
Various festivals are celebrated throughout the year. Kali Puja of Mainaguri is renowned. It also celebrates Eid and Christmas Day with similar pompousness.

=== Sports and entertainment ===
Mainaguri has a famous playground (Known as Mainaguri Football Ground) where several football tournaments are held every year.

Other than that several fairs like Boishakhi Mela, Mela during Durga Puja, book fair, one yearly cultural function organised by local clubs is also held. This ground is an inseparable part of the people of Mainaguri.

== Demographics ==
According to the 2011 Census of India, Mainaguri had a total population of 30,490 of which 15,487 (51%) were males and 15,003 (49%) were females. There were 2,951 persons in the age range of 0 to 6 years. The total number of literate people in Mainaguri was 24,408 (88.63% of the population over 6 years).

As of 2001 India census, Mainaguri had a population of 27,086. Males constitute 51% of the population and females 49%. Mainaguri has an average literacy rate of 75%, higher than the national average of 59.5%: male literacy is 80%, and female literacy is 70%. In Mainaguri, 11% of the population is under 6 years of age.

In 2021, Maynaguri municipality was formed comprising Maynaguri census town and Madhabdanga-I and Maynaguri panchayats and parts of Khagrabari-I and Domohoni-I panchayats of Maynaguri block. The population of the new municipality was 45,045.

=== Languages ===
Languages spoken in Mainaguri Town (2011)
1. Bengali (96.2%)
2. Hindi (3.10%)
3. Nepali (0.40%)
4. Others (0.30%)

== Geography ==
Places and tea estates in Jalpaiguri Sadar subdivision (including Rajganj, Jalpaiguri, Maynaguri and Dhupguri CD blocks) in Jalpaiguri district
CT: census town, R: rural/ urban centre, N: neighbourhood, C: cantonment, NP: national park/ wildlife sanctuary, TE: tea estate
Abbreviations used in names – TG for Tea Garden (town/village), TE for Tea Estate, JRS: junction railway station
Owing to space constraints in the small map, the actual locations in a larger map may vary slightly

=== Municipality ===
Maynaguri, earlier a census town was created a municipality on 6 July 2021.

=== Area overview ===
The map alongside shows the alluvial floodplains south of the outer foothills of the Himalayas. The area is mostly flat, except for low hills in the Northern portions. It is a primarily rural area with 62.01% of the population living in rural areas and a moderate 37.99% living in the urban areas. Tea gardens in the Dooars and Terai regions produce 226 million kg or over a quarter of India's total tea crop. Some tea gardens were identified in the 2011 census as census towns or villages. Such places are marked in the map as CT (census town) or R (rural/ urban centre). Specific tea estate pages are marked TE.

Note: The map alongside presents some of the notable locations in the subdivision. All places marked in the map are linked in the larger full screen map.

=== Location ===
Mainaguri is located at 26.57°N 88.82°E. It has an average elevation of 84 metres (275 feet).

Mainaguri is about 10 km north-east of Jalpaiguri and 50 km from Siliguri. Local attractions include Jalpesh Temple, Gorumara National Park and Chapramari Wildlife Sanctuary. The nearest airport is Civil Enclave Bagdogra, and the nearest railway station is New Mainaguri.

Five roads connect Mainaguri with

1. Siliguri, Jalpaiguri (West)
2. Alipurduar, Cooch Behar (East)
3. Changrabandha, Mathabhanga (South)
4. Malbazar, Lataguri (North)
5. Ramsai (North-west).

== Healthcare ==
Maynaguri Rural Hospital, with 60 beds at Mainaguri, is the major government medical facility in the Maynaguri CD block.

== Infrastructure ==
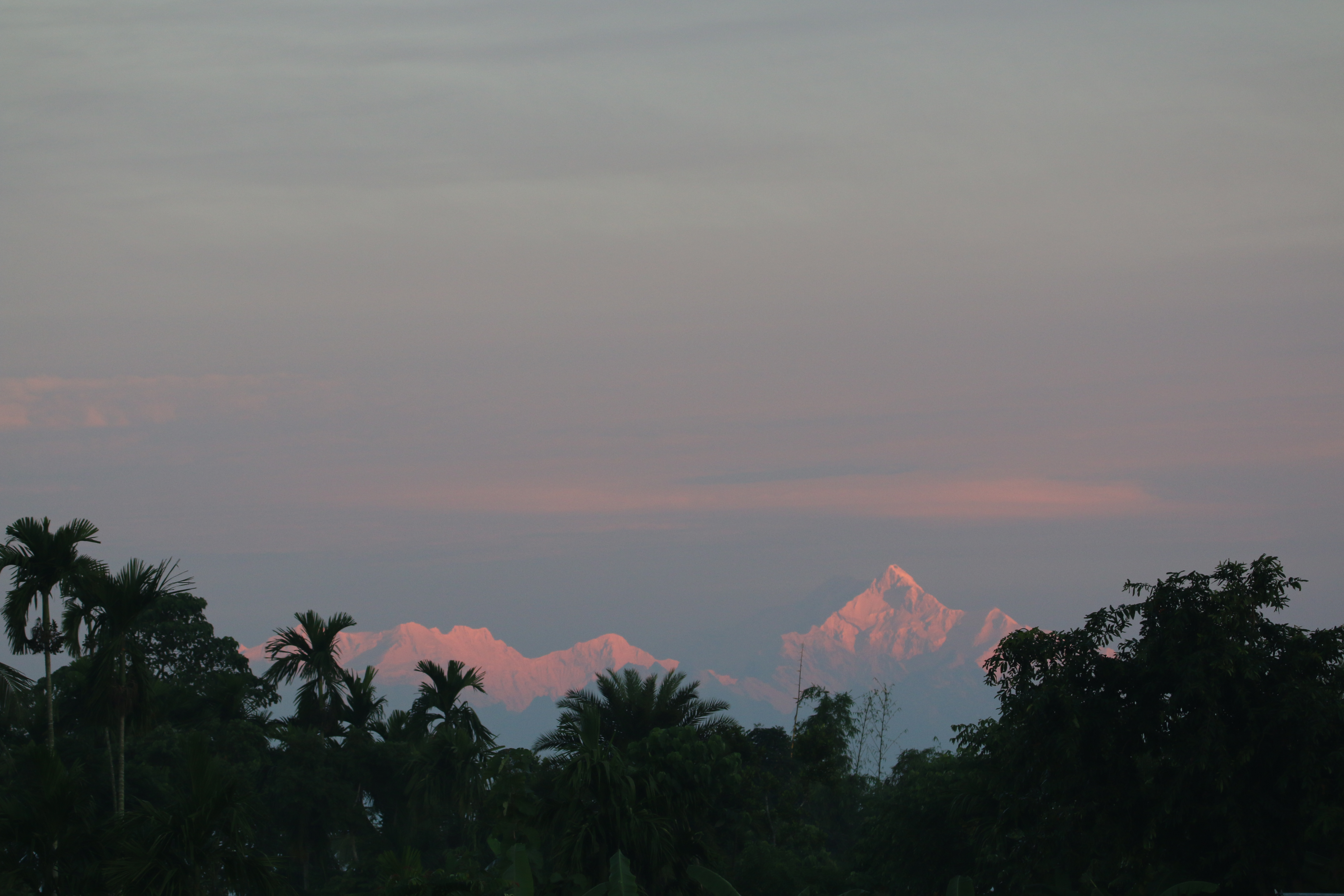
A view of Himalayan Range

According to the District Census Handbook 2011, Jalpaiguri, Mainaguri covered an area of 12.38 km^{2}. Among the civic amenities, it had 28 km roads with open drains, the protected water supply involved overhead tanks, uncovered wells. It had 3,458 domestic electric connections, 518 road lighting points. Among the medical facilities it had 1 hospital, 3 dispensaries/ health centres, 30 medicine shops. Among the educational facilities it had 12 primary schools, 5 middle schools, 5 secondary schools, 5 senior secondary schools. It had 4 recognised shorthand, typewriting and vocational training centre, 24 non-formal education centres (Sarva Shiksha Abhiyan), 1 special school for the disabled. Among the social, recreational and cultural facilities it had 1 cinema theatre, 1 auditorium/ community hall, 1 public library. Three important commodities it produced were: furniture, jute yarn, tea. It had branches of 4 nationalised banks, 2 private commercial bank and 1 cooperative bank.

- Radhika Library, has been operating here since 1910. Radhikanath Nandi who was the Deputy Collector of the Khasmahal office at Mainaguri, helped to begin the library. At the beginning, 1 anna was decided as the monthly fees of the library. It used to be a rural library. It was upgraded as town library on 1 March 1983. It has more than 14,000 books and around 600 members.

== Education ==
- Manoranjan Saha Memorial B.Ed. College, was established in 2010. Also known as Maynaguri B.ed College. It is affiliated by WBUTTEPA and approved by National Council for Teacher Education. This college offers B.ed & D.El.Ed Courses.
- Maynaguri College, was established in 1999; affiliated with North Bengal University.
- Maynaguri Government Polytechnic College, was established in 2015. This college approved by AICTE and affiliated by WBSCTE. This college offers Diploma in Engineering & Technology courses(10+3) in Civil Engineering, Survey Engineering and Instrumentation & Control Engineering with 60 intake capacity of each stream.

== Places of interest ==
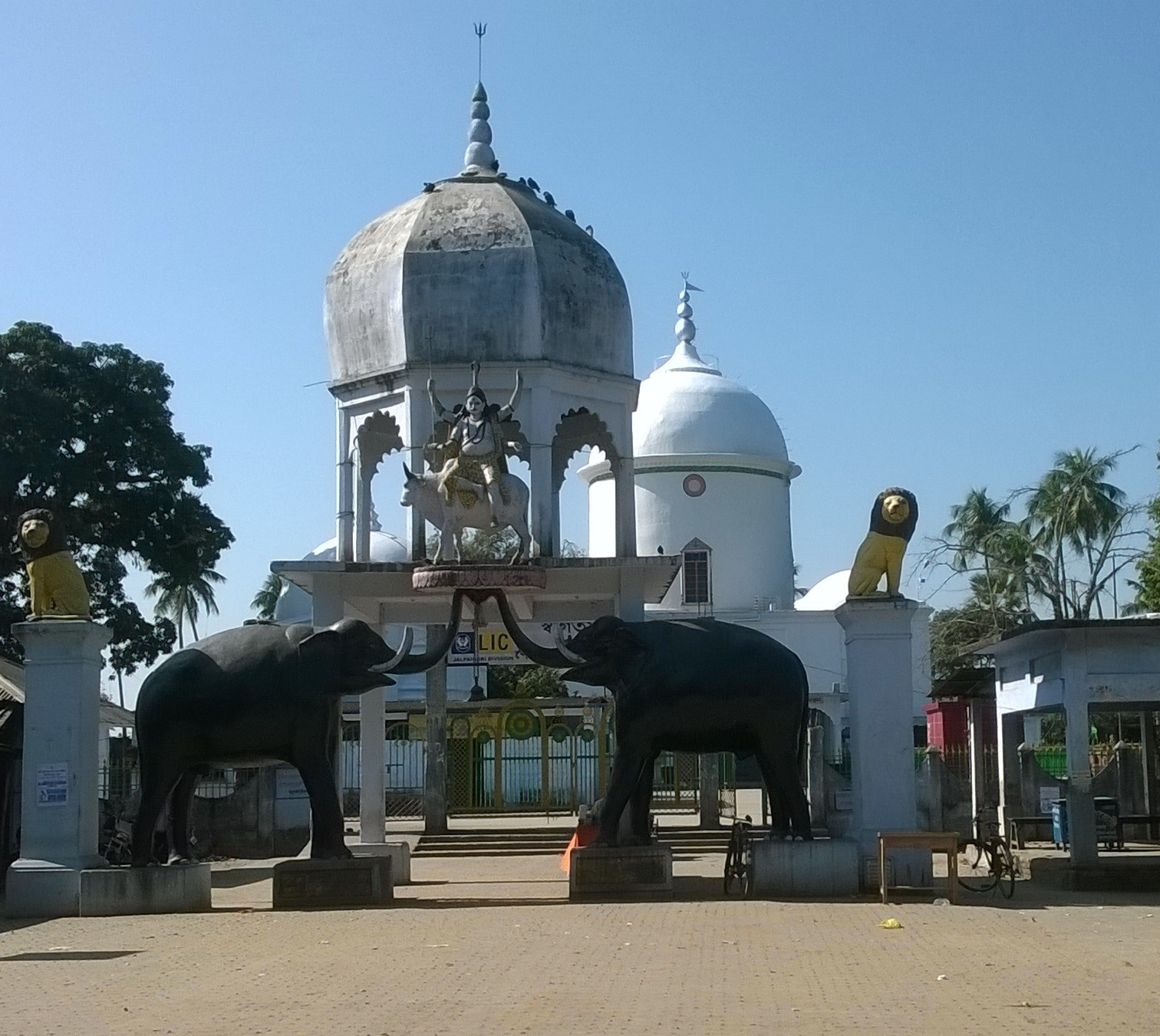
Jalpesh Temple of Lord Shiva

=== Jalpesh Temple ===
The Jalpesh Temple is approximately 3 kilometres from away Mainaguri 26°31′32″N 88°52′1″E, and is dedicated to Lord Jalpeshwar (Siva). The temple was built in a style akin to Islamic architecture. Inside the temple, there is a Shivling called 'Anadi'. Mahashivaratri is the main festival celebrated in this temple, which is 126 feet high and 120 feet wide. Pilgrims come during Sravani Mela in July–August and during the fair of Jalpesh Mela in February–March to offer special puja to Siva. After worshipping, devotees, whose number reach approximately 1.2 million, collect water from River Teesta and walk barefoot 15 kilometres to the temple.

Jalpesh Temple was founded by Bisu Singh of Cooch Behar in A.D. 1524. His son, Maharaja Narayan, rebuilt the temple in A.D. 1563. Pran Narayan in turn rebuilt the temple in A.D. 1663

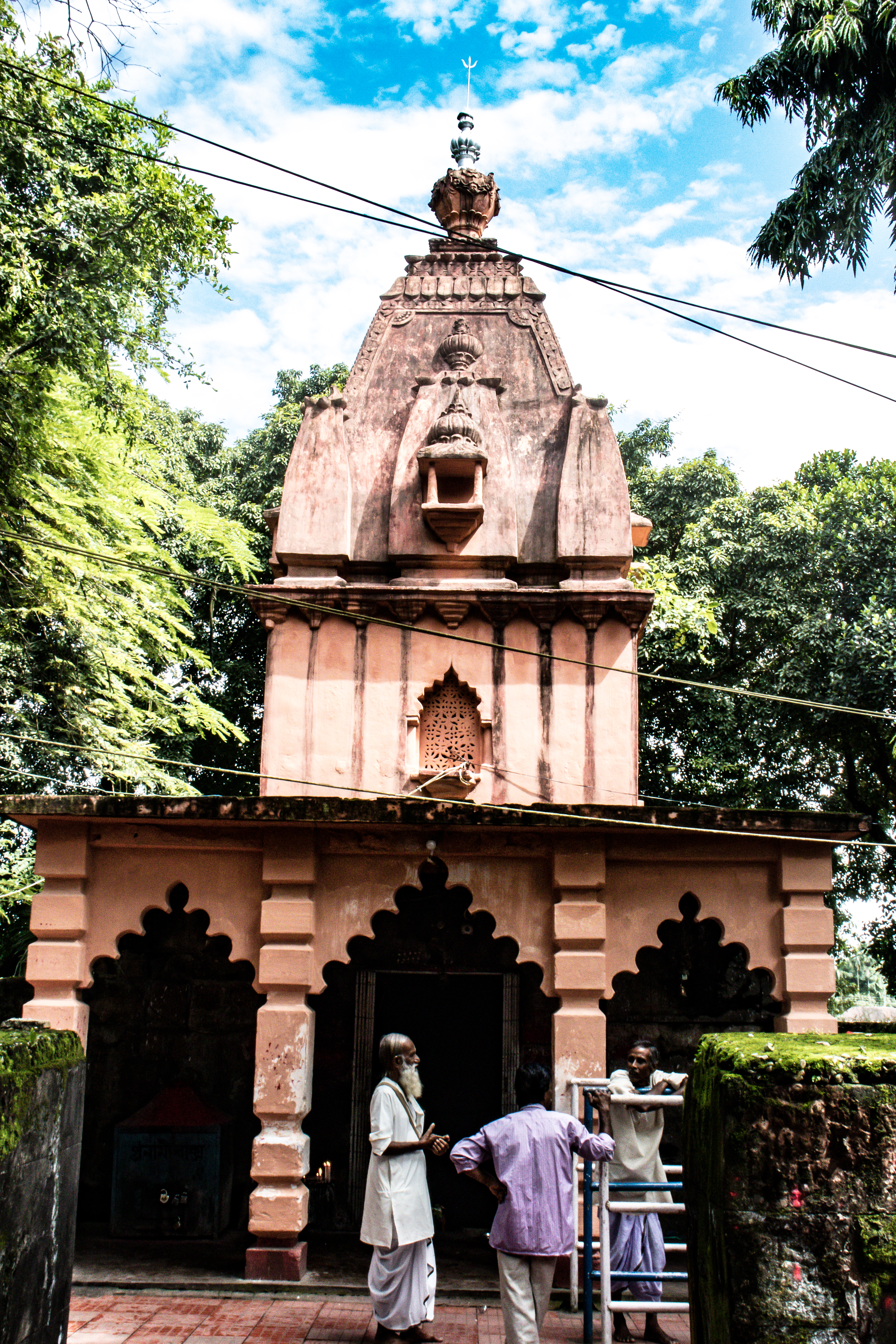
Jatileswar Temple of Lord Shiva

=== Jatileswar Temple ===
The Jatileswar Temple is located in Purbba Dehar about 10 km from the Maynaguri town of Jalpaiguri district. It is situated on the western side of Jaldhaka River to the highway connecting Maynaguri with Dhupguri. The location of the Temple is about halfway between the two towns. About 8 km after Maynaguri on National Highway 31, you will reach Husludanga crossing. Leave the National Highway and take the right-hand road to Husludanga which is a small village. From here a small village road to your right will take you to the Jatileswar Temple.

The temple in the Dooars area of North Bengal is one of the oldest temples in the region. It has religious as well as historic significance. The main temple was built during the time of the Gupta rulers of Bengal around 320 AD to 600 AD. The temple is dedicated to Jatileswar or Lord Shiva.

It is under the protection of the Archaeological Survey of India. The government of West Bengal had declared the temple of Purbba Dehar as an archaeological site and the place now has been reserved under the State Protected Monuments.

=== Other places ===
- Ramsai Wildlife (Gorumara National Park)

== Transport ==
Road:

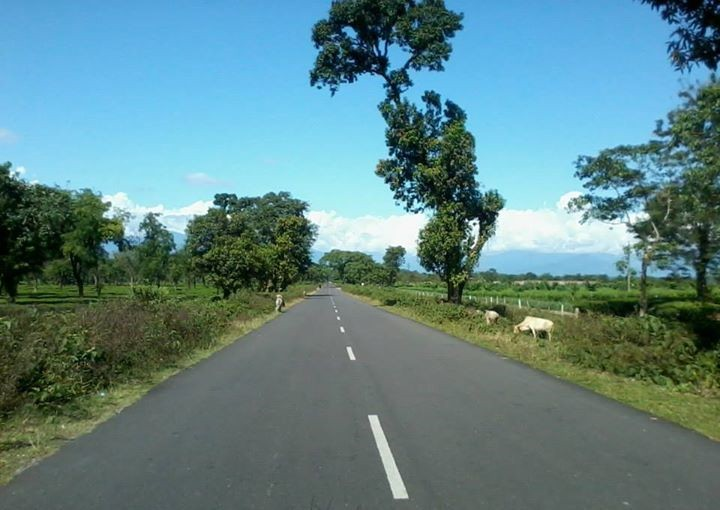
National Highway 27 (India)

The main mode of transport in the area is roadways. Most of the places are well connected by roads and to rest of India. National Highway 27 (India) is the main highway of the area. Regular bus services provided by North Bengal State Transport Corporation and Assam State Transport Corporation and other private parties run between all important places of the area. Share jeeps and maxi-taxies are quite popular in the area.

Rail:

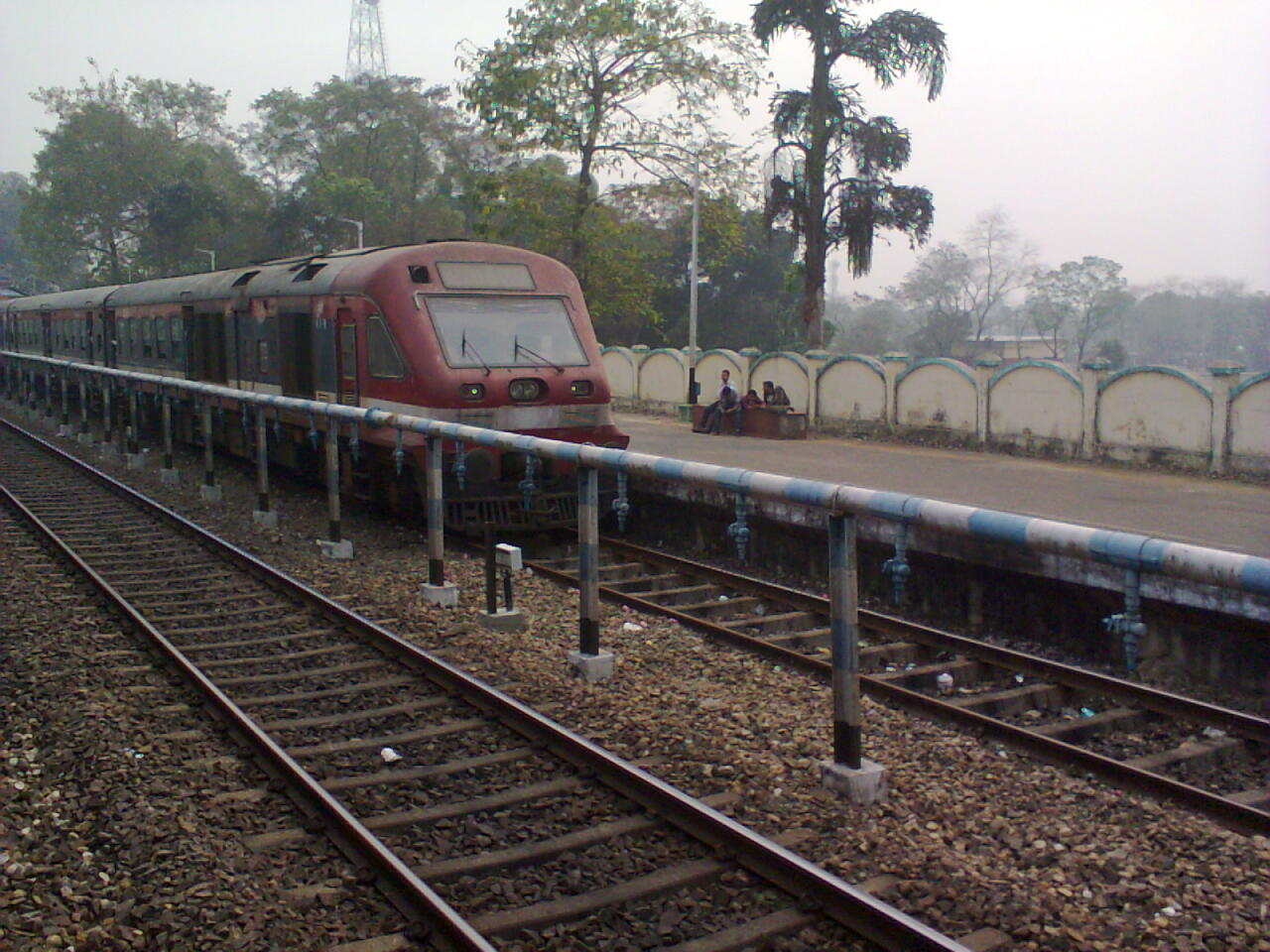
A DMU train @ New Maynaguri

Mainaguri lies in the Northeast Frontier Railway zone of the Indian Railways. There are railway links to the rest of the country directly and via Kolkata. The major railway junction of New Jalpaiguri (Code:NJP) is 45 km from the town. New Mainaguri railway station (NMX) serves the town directly. Another rail station of this city is Maynaguri Road Railway Station (MYGD). It is about 5 km from the city. Maynaguri Road station is an important station of Malbazar-Changrabandha. Previously it was known as Doars railway. Mainaguri Road station is also 'Y' connected with New Maynaguri and New Domohoni rail station.
