= Dinesh Sarkar =

Indian politician

Member of the West Bengal Legislative Assembly
- Incumbent
- Assumed office 4 May 2026
- Preceded by: Khageswar Roy
- Constituency: Rajganj

Personal details
- Party: Bharatiya Janata Party
- Profession: Politician

Dinesh Sarkar is an Indian politician from West Bengal. He won in the 2026 West Bengal Legislative Assembly election from Rajganj, as a member of the Bharatiya Janata Party.
