= Maynaguri Assembly constituency =

Maynaguri (SC)
- Constituency No. 16 for the West Bengal Legislative Assembly
- Interactive Map Outlining Maynaguri (SC) Assembly Constituency

Constituency details
- Country: India
- Region: East India
- State: West Bengal
- District: Jalpaiguri
- Lok Sabha constituency: Jalpaiguri (SC)
- Established: 1951
- Total electors: 259,205
- Reservation: SC

Member of Legislative Assembly
- 18th West Bengal Legislative Assembly
- Incumbent Dalim Chandra Roy
- Party: Bharatiya Janata Party
- Elected year: 2026

Most Successful parties from Maynaguri (SC) assembly
1. Revolutionary Socialist Party (8 times) (42.1%)
2. Indian National Congress (5 times) (26.3%)
3. Bangla Congress (2 times) (10.5%)
4. All India Trinamool Congress (2 times) (10.5%)
5. Bharatiya Janata Party (2 times) (10.5%)

Maynaguri (SC) Assembly constituency is an assembly constituency in Jalpaiguri district in the Indian state of West Bengal. It is reserved for scheduled castes.

== Overview ==
As per orders of the Delimitation Commission, No. 16 Maynaguri Assembly constituency (SC) covers Mainaguri municipality and Maynaguri community development block,

Maynaguri Assembly constituency is part of No. 3 Jalpaiguri (Lok Sabha constituency) (SC).

== Members of the Legislative Assembly ==
Year	Name	Party
1951	Surendra Nath Roy	Indian National Congress
1957	Jaineswar Roy	Indian National Congress
1962	Kamini Mohan Roy	Indian National Congress
1967	Jaineswar Roy	Bangla Congress
1969	Jaineswar Roy	Bangla Congress
1971	Bijoy Krishna Mohanta	Indian National Congress
1972	Bijoy Krishna Mohanta	Indian National Congress
1977	Tarak Bandhu Roy	Revolutionary Socialist Party
1982	Tarak Bandhu Roy	Revolutionary Socialist Party
1987	Tarak Bandhu Roy	Revolutionary Socialist Party
1991	Nityananda Adhikari	Revolutionary Socialist Party
1996	Bachchamohan Roy	Revolutionary Socialist Party
2001	Bachchamohan Roy	Revolutionary Socialist Party
2006	Bachchamohan Roy	Revolutionary Socialist Party
2011	Ananta Deb Adhikari	Revolutionary Socialist Party
2014^	Ananta Deb Adhikari	All India Trinamool Congress
2016	Ananta Deb Adhikari	All India Trinamool Congress
2021	Kaushik Roy	Bharatiya Janata Party
2026	Dalim Chandra Roy	Bharatiya Janata Party

- ^ by-election

== Election results ==
=== 2026 ===
In the 2026 West Bengal Legislative Assembly election, Dalim Chandra Roy of BJP defeated his nearest rival Rammohan Ray of TMC by 56,503 votes.

2026 West Bengal Legislative Assembly election: Maynaguri (SC)
Party	Candidate	Votes	%	±%
BJP	Dalim Chandra Roy	147,403	58.62	▲9.78
AITC	Rammohan Ray	90,900	36.15	▼7.64
RSP	Sudeb Ray	2,793	1.11	▼1.33
IND	Ratna Roy	1,829	0.73	New entry
INC	Jogen Sarkar	959	0.38	▼4.05
IND	Sujan Mandal	941	0.37	New entry
BSP	Priyanka Sarkar	903	0.36	▼0.3
MPI	Adhir Chandra Barman	746	0.3	New entry
IND	Ramchandra Roy	695	0.28	New entry
KPP(U)	Dipak Roy	674	0.27	▼0.94
IND	Vishnu Das	612	0.24	New entry
IND	Tapati Roy Mallick	304	0.12	New entry
SUCI(C)	Shyamal Ray	299	0.12	▼0.2
AMB	Suparna Sarkar	259	0.1	▼0.21
NOTA	Nota	2,130	0.85	▼0.46
Majority		56,503	22.47	▲17.42
Turnout		251,447	97.01	▲7.67
Registered electors		259,205		▼1.91
BJP hold		Swing	8.71	

=== 2021 ===
2021 West Bengal Legislative Assembly election: Maynaguri
Party	Candidate	Votes	%	±%
BJP	Kaushik Roy	115,306	48.84	
AITC	Manoj Roy	103,395	43.79	
RSP	Naresh Chandra Roy	5,760	2.44	
Kamatapur People’s Party	Biswanath Roy	2,868	1.21	
NOTA	None of the above	3,095	1.31	
Majority		11,911	5.05	
Turnout		236,093	89.34	
BJP gain from AITC		Swing		

=== 2016 ===
2016 West Bengal Legislative Assembly election: Maynaguri (SC) constituency
Party	Candidate	Votes	%	±%
AITC	Ananta Deb Adhikari	100,837	47.85	−3.88
RSP	Chaya Dey (Roy)	65,930	31.29	−3.86
BJP	Biswajit Roy	30,742	14.59	
NOTA	None of the above	4,368	2.07	+0.46
KPPU	Kausik Roy	3,856	1.83	
BSP	Amit Kumar Sarkar	1,818	0.86	
CPI(ML)L	Rupeswar Ray	1,701	0.81	−0.28
AMB	Binay Sarkar	1,476	0.70	
Turnout		210,728	89.04	−9.06
AITC hold		Swing		

=== 2014 bypoll ===
In the 2014 by election, Ananta Deb Adhikari of All India Trinamool Congress defeated Dinabandhu Roy (Palu) of Revolutionary Socialist Party by 31,790 votes. The former RSP MLA switched over to Trinamool Congress and had to face election again.

2014 West Bengal Legislative Assembly bye-election: Maynaguri (SC) constituency
Party	Candidate	Votes	%	±%
AITC	Ananta Deb Adhikari	99,185	51.73	+12.36
RSP	Dinabandhu Roy (Paltu)	67,395	35.15	−13.56
Independent	Animes Roy	10,938	5.90	
INC	Puranjan Sarker	8,488	4.43	
NOTA	None of the above	3,141	1.61	
Rashtriya Janadhikar Suraksha Party	Mohit Kumar Roy	2,242	1.17	
CPI(ML)L	Rupeswar Ray	2,082	1.09	
SUCI(C)	Suresh Chandra Roy	1,406	0.73	
Turnout		194,877	98.10	+10.16
AITC gain from RSP		Swing		

=== 2011 ===
In the 2011 elections, Ananta Deb Adhikari of RSP defeated his nearest rival Juthika Roy Basunia of Trinamool Congress.

West Bengal assembly elections, 2011: Maynaguri (SC) constituency
Party	Candidate	Votes	%	±%
RSP	Ananta Deb Adhikari	84,887	48.71	
AITC	Juthika Roy Basunia	68,611	39.37	
BJP	Bibhas Chandra Paul	6,309	3.62	
Independent	Bharani Roy	5,100	2.93	
Independent	Dinesh Sinha	4,892	2.81	
CPI(ML)L	Haripada Ray Lashkar	2,259		
BSP	Santi Kumar Sarkar	2,218		
Turnout		174,276	87.84	
RSP hold		Swing		

# Trinamool Congress did not contest this seat in 2006.

=== 2006 ===
In the 2006, 2001 and 1996 state assembly elections, Bachchamohan Roy of RSP won the Maynaguri assembly seat (SC) defeating his nearest rivals Gokul Kumar Roy of BJP, Purnaprabha Barman of Trinamool Congress and Manmatha Ray Basunia of Congress respectively. Contests in most years were multi cornered but only winners and runners are being mentioned. Nityananda Adhikary of RSP defeated Manamatha Ray Basunia of Congress in 1991. Tarak Bandhu Roy of RSP defeated Manmatha Ray Basunia of Congress in 1987, Mridulendra Deb Rakshit of ICS in 1982 and Bhabendra Nath Roy Hakim of Janata Party in 1977.

=== 1972 ===
Bijoy Krishna Mohanta of Congress won in 1972 and 1971. Jajneswar Roy of Congress won in 1969 and 1967. Kamini Mohan Roy of Congress won in 1962. Janjneswar Roy of Congress won in 1957. In independent India's first election in 1951, Surendra Nath Roy of Congress won from Mainaguri. Jajneswar Roy and Mangaldas Bhagat, both of Congress, won from the Central Duars joint seat.
