= Sukhbilas Barma =

Indian politician

Member of West Bengal Legislative Assembly
- In office 10 May 2011 – 27 March 2021
- Preceded by: Debaprasad Roy
- Succeeded by: Pradip Kumar Barma
- Constituency: Jalpaiguri

Personal details
- Party: Indian National Congress
- Profession: Politician

Sukhbilas Barma is an Indian politician and former IAS officer. He served as a Member of the West Bengal Legislative Assembly from 2011 to 2021, representing the Jalpaiguri Assembly constituency as a member of the Indian National Congress party.

== See also ==
- 2011 West Bengal Legislative Assembly election
- West Bengal Legislative Assembly
