= Dalim Chandra Roy =

Indian politician

Member of the West Bengal Legislative Assembly
- Incumbent
- Assumed office 4 May 2026
- Preceded by: Kaushik Roy
- Constituency: Maynaguri

Personal details
- Party: Bharatiya Janata Party
- Profession: Politician, Businessman

Dalim Chandra Roy is an Indian politician from West Bengal. He won in the 2026 West Bengal Legislative Assembly election from Maynaguri, as a member of the Bharatiya Janata Party.
