= Ananta Deb Adhikari (Jalpaiguri MLA) =

Indian politician

Member of the West Bengal Legislative Assembly
- Incumbent
- Assumed office 4 May 2026
- Preceded by: Pradip Kumar Barma
- Constituency: Jalpaiguri

Personal details
- Party: Bharatiya Janata Party
- Education: University of North Bengal
- Profession: Politician, Advocate

Ananta Deb Adhikari is an Indian politician from West Bengal. He won in the 2026 West Bengal Legislative Assembly election from Jalpaiguri, as a member of the Bharatiya Janata Party.
