= Gobinda Roy =

Indian politician

Gobinda Roy is an Indian politician belonging to All India Forward Bloc. He is currently serving as the Chairman of West Bengal committee of the party. He is also the National President of All India Agragami Kisan Sabha and previously he was the West Bengal State Secretary of the peasants organisation. He represented Jalpaiguri Assembly constituency in West Bengal Legislative Assembly from 2001 to 2006.
