= Murshidabad Lok Sabha constituency =

Lok Sabha constituency in West Bengal

Coordinates: 24°11′N 88°16′E

Murshidabad WB-11
- Lok Sabha constituency
- Interactive Map Outlining Murshidabad Lok Sabha Constituency

Constituency details
- Country: India
- Region: East India
- State: West Bengal
- Assembly constituencies: Bhagabangola; Raninagar; Murshidabad; Hariharpara; Domkal; Jalangi; Karimpur
- Established: 1951
- Total electors: 18,88,097 (2024)
- Reservation: None

Member of Parliament
- 18th Lok Sabha
- Incumbent Abu Taher Khan
- Party: NCPI
- Alliance: NDA
- Elected year: 2024

Murshidabad Lok Sabha constituency is a parliamentary constituency in Murshidabad district, West Bengal, India. While six assembly segments of No. 11 Murshidabad Lok Sabha constituency are in Murshidabad district, one assembly segment is in Nadia district.

The most successful party in the Lok Sabha elections
1. Communist Party of India (Marxist) (47.0%)
2. Indian National Congress (23.5%)
3. Others (29.4%)
4. 0.00%

== Assembly segments ==
Parliamentary constituencies in West Bengal – 1. Cooch Behar, 2. Alipurduars, 3. Jalpaiguri, 4. Darjeeling, 5. Raiganj, 6. Balurghat, 7. Maldaha Uttar, 8. Maldaha Dakshin, 9. Jangipur, 10. Baharampur, 11. Murshidabad, 12. Krishnanagar, 13. Ranaghat, 14. Bangaon, 15. Barrackpore, 16. Dum Dum, 17. Barasat, 18. Basirhat, 19. Jaynagar, 20. Mathurapur, 21. Diamond Harbour, 22. Jadavpur, 23. Kolkata Dakshin, 24. Kolkata Uttar, 25. Howrah, 26. Uluberia, 27. Serampore, 28. Hooghly, 29. Arambagh, 30. Tamluk, 31, Kanthi, 32. Ghatal, 33. Jhargram, 34. Medinipur, 35. Purulia, 36. Bankura, 37. Bishnupur, 38. Bardhaman Purba, 39. Bardhaman Durgapur, 40. Asansol, 41. Bolpur, 42. Birbhum

As per the order of the Delimitation Commission in respect of the delimitation of constituencies in West Bengal, parliamentary constituency no. 11 Murshidabad is composed of the following segments since 2009:

#	Name	District	Member	Party	2024 Lead
62	Bhagabangola	Murshidabad	Reyat Hossain Sarkar	AITC	AITC
63	Raninagar	Murshidabad	Julfikar Ali	INC	CPI(M)
64	Murshidabad	Murshidabad	Gouri Shankar Ghosh	BJP	BJP
73	Hariharpara	Murshidabad	Niamot Sheikh	AITC	AITC
75	Domkal	Murshidabad	Mohammad Mostafijur Rahaman	CPI(M)	AITC
76	Jalangi	Murshidabad	Babar Ali	AITC	AITC
77	Karimpur	Nadia	Samarendra Nath Ghosh	BJP	AITC

In 2004 Murshidabad Lok Sabha constituency was composed of the following assembly segments:Lalgola (assembly constituency no. 55), Bhagabangola (assembly constituency no. 56), Murshidabad (assembly constituency no. 58), Jalangi (assembly constituency no. 59), Domkal (assembly constituency no. 60), Hariharpara (assembly constituency no. 62), Karimpur (assembly constituency no. 69)

== Members of the Parliament ==
Year	Member	Party
1952	Muhammed Khuda Bukhsh	Indian National Congress
1957	Muhammed Khuda Bukhsh	Indian National Congress
1962	Syed Badrudduja	Independent Democratic Party
1967	Syed Badrudduja	Independent Democratic Party
1971	Abu Taleb Chowdhury	Independent
1977	Kazim Ali Meerza	Janata Party
1980	Syed Masudal Hossain	Communist Party of India (Marxist)
1984	Syed Masudal Hossain	Communist Party of India (Marxist)
1989	Syed Masudal Hossain	Communist Party of India (Marxist)
1991	Syed Masudal Hossain	Communist Party of India (Marxist)
1996	Syed Masudal Hossain	Communist Party of India (Marxist)
1998	Moinul Hassan	Communist Party of India (Marxist)
1999	Moinul Hassan	Communist Party of India (Marxist)
2004	Abdul Mannan Hossain	Indian National Congress
2009	Abdul Mannan Hossain	Indian National Congress
2014	Badaruddoza Khan	Communist Party of India (Marxist)
2019	Abu Taher Khan	Trinamool Congress
2024	Abu Taher Khan	Trinamool Congress
2026 (Note: Switched to NCPI as part of AITC Rebels in Lok Sabha.)	Abu Taher Khan	Nationalist Citizens Party of India

== Election results ==
Vote share of Winning candidates
2024	44.27%
2019	41.57%
2014	33.13%
2009	47.21%
2004	45.86%
1999	47.30%
1998	49.96%
1996	45.40%
1991	48.36%
1989	45.58%
1984	47.05%
1980	50.30%
1977	40.05%
1971	34.38%
1967	48.32%
1962	47.01%
1957	41.93%
1952	66.90%

=== 2024 ===
2024 Indian general elections: Murshidabad
Party	Candidate	Votes	%	±%
AITC	Abu Taher Khan	682,442	44.27	▲2.70
CPI(M)	Mohammed Salim	5,18,227	33.62	▲21.18
BJP	Gouri Shankar Ghosh	2,92,031	18.94	▲1.89
SDPI	Md. Taiedul Islam	3,293	0.21	▲0.21
Majority		1,64,215	10.65	▼5.02
Turnout		15,39,112 (Note: does not include postal ballots)	81.52	▼2.77
AITC hold		Swing		

=== 2019 ===
2019 Indian general elections: Murshidabad
Party	Candidate	Votes	%	±%
AITC	Abu Taher Khan	604,346	41.57	▲19.56
INC	Abu Hena	3,77,929	26.00	▼5.72
BJP	Humayun Kabir	2,47,809	17.05	▲9.15
CPI(M)	Badaruddoza Khan	1,80,793	12.44	▼21.33
NOTA	None of the above	15,025	1.03	
Majority		2,26,417	15.57	
Turnout		14,54,192	84.29	
AITC gain from CPI(M)		Swing		

=== 2014 ===
2014 Indian general election: Murshidabad
Party	Candidate	Votes	%	±%
CPI(M)	Badaruddoza Khan	426,947	33.13	
INC	Abdul Mannan Hossain	408,494	31.70	
AITC	Ali Mohammad	289,027	22.43	
BJP	Sujit Kumar Ghosh	101,069	7.84	
AIUDF	Md. Najmul Hoque	11,333	0.88	
SUCI(C)	Kamarujjaman Khandekar (Bakul)	8,378	0.65	
SDPI	Masudul Islam	6,010	0.47	
BSP	Jitendra Nath Halder	5,722	0.44	
IUML	Abdul Bari	5,383	0.42	
WPOI	Md. Khodabox Sekh	6,445	0.50	
Independent	Asim Kumar Das	4,539	0.35	
AMB	Swapan Kumar Mandal	4,260	0.33	
NOTA	None of the Above	10,156	0.79	
Majority		18,453	1.43	
Turnout		1,287,763	85.16	
Swing to CPI(M) from INC		Swing		

=== 2009 ===
General Election, 2009: Murshidabad
Party	Candidate	Votes	%	±%
INC	Abdul Mannan Hossain	496,348	47.21%	
CPI(M)	Anisur Rahman	460,701	43.82%	
BJP	Nirmal Kumar Saha	42,290	4.02%	
Independent	Santwana Halder (Saha)	11,991	1.14%	
Independent	Khadija Banu	9,090	0.86%	
Independent	Dr.Sukumar Ghosh	8,204	0.78%	
BSP	Chitta Ranjan Mondal	7,913	0.75%	
Independent	Mehdi Alam	5,897	0.56%	
AUDF	Jaforulla Molla	5,630	0.54%	
Independent	Chandan Kr. Mondal	1,970	0.19%	
SP	Md. Sahazamal	1,349	0.13%	
Majority		35,647	3.39%	
Turnout		1,051,383	88.14%	
INC hold		Swing		

=== 2004 ===
2004 Indian general election: Murshidabad
Party	Candidate	Votes	%	±%
INC	Abdul Mannan Hossain	461,895	45.86	
CPI(M)	Moinul Hassan Ahamed	446,415	44.32	
AITC	Ali Mohammad	43,716	4.34	
Independent	Khadija Banu	13,686	1.36	
PBRML	Abdur Rashid Mondal	10,446	1.04	
BSP	Abdul Hannan Seikh	10,013	0.99	
Independent	Babita Haldar	7,503	0.74	
Independent	Dinesh Mandal	4,793	0.48	
INL	Md. Sahabuddin	4,550	0.45	
SP	Syed Nawab Jani Meerza	4,204	0.42	
Majority		15,480	1.54	
Turnout				
Swing to INC from CPI(M)		Swing		

=== 1999 ===
1999 Indian general election: Murshidabad
Party	Candidate	Votes	%	±%
CPI(M)	Moinul Hassan	391,366	47.30%	
INC	Abdul Mannan Hossain	268,006	32.39%	
AITC	Sagir Hossain	142,275	17.20%	
Independent	Khadija Banu	11,773	1.42%	
IUML	Moulana Md. Abdul Bari	6,220	0.75%	
BSP	Sandhya Mondal	3,289	0.40%	
NCP	Nripendra Nath Mandal	2,178	0.26%	
SUCI	Nasrat Ali Mandal	921	0.11%	
RJD	Uttam Halder	859	0.10%	
INL	Rezwan meerza	508	0.06%	
Majority		123,360	14.8	
Turnout		9,26,375	77.33%	23
CPI(M) hold		Swing		

=== 1998 ===
1998 Indian general election: Murshidabad
Party	Candidate	Votes	%	±%
CPI(M)	Moinul Hassan	463,401	49.96	+4.56
INC	Anarul Hossain Khan	272,935	29.42	
AITC	Sagir Hossain	149,061	16.07	
Independent	Abdus Salam	19,054	2.05	
Independent	Saimuddin Sarkar	16,254	1.75	
IUML	Mondal Kader	5,542	0.60	
JP	Nripendra Nath Mandal	1,351	0.15	
Majority		190,466	20.3	
Turnout		9,39,684	81.4%	
CPI(M) hold		Swing		

=== 1996 ===
1996 Indian general election: Murshidabad
Party	Candidate	Votes	%	±%
CPI(M)	Masudal Hossain Syed	452,273	45.40	
INC	Anarul Hossain Khan	415,088	41.70	
BJP	Amulya Mondol	60,339	6.10	
Independent	Abdus Salam	23,734	2.40	
Independent	Sarkar Gopinath	8,559	0.90	
AIMIM	Ansari Mohammad Ali	5,153	0.50	
Independent	Sakta Roy	3,118	0.30	
IUML	Abbas Ali	2,363	0.20	
AMB	Narendra Nath Biawas	1,379	0.10	
Independent	Joynal Abedin	537	0.10	
Majority		37,185	3.70	
Turnout		9,96,549	87.60	
CPI(M) hold		Swing		

=== 1991 ===
1991 Indian general election: Murshidabad
Party	Candidate	Votes	%	±%
CPI(M)	Masudal Hossain Syed	382,003	48.36	
INC	Ali Hossain Mondal	269,402	34.10	
BJP	Amulya Kr. Mondal	86,868	11.00	
Independent	Abdus Salam	19,598	2.48	
CPI(M-L)	Wasique Bahadur	10,847	1.37	
Independent	Sk. Mohammad Jajangir	7,890	1.00	
JP	Mokaddim Shaikh	4,531	0.57	
BSP	Joydhor Dhirendra	4,473	0.57	
IUML	Biswas Abdul Latif	2,649	0.34	
DDP	Ram Garib Majhi	1,671	0.21	
Majority		112,601	14.26	
Turnout		806,098	81.01	
CPI(M) hold		Swing		

=== 1989 ===
1989 Indian general election: Murshidabad
Party	Candidate	Votes	%	±%
CPI(M)	Masudal Hossain Syed	368,860	45.58	
INC	Azizur Rahman	312,316	38.60	
Independent	Sarkar Saimuddin	46,450	5.74	
BJP	Shyamal Gupta	33,601	4.15	
Independent	Abdus Salam	21,582	2.67	
IUML	Abdul Latif	14,377	1.78	
CPI(M-L)	Shekhar Dutta	10,205	1.26	
AMB	Madhab Kumar Sardar	1,795	0.22	
Majority		56,544	6.99	
Turnout		820,706	83.20	
CPI(M) hold		Swing		

=== 1984 ===
1984 Indian general election: Murshidabad
Party	Candidate	Votes	%	±%
CPI(M)	Syed Musudal Hossain	316,571	47.05	
INC	Azizur Rahman	310,309	46.12	
BJP	Shyamal Gupta	19,542	2.90	
SUCI(C)	Mosharaf Hossain	19,371	2.88	
IUML	Sarkar Saimuddin	4,431	0.66	
Independent	Santosh Sarkar	2,605	0.39	
Majority		6,262	0.93	
Turnout		684,106	84.86	
CPI(M) hold		Swing		

=== 1980 ===
1980 Indian general election: Murshidabad
Party	Candidate	Votes	%	±%
CPI(M)	Masudal Hassain Syed	291,325	50.30	
INC(I)	Abdus Sattar	222,570	38.43	
SUCI(C)	Abu Raihan Biswas	27,544	4.76	
Independent	Gopal Gosh	10,864	1.88	
IUML	A. K. M. Hassan Uzzaman	10,609	1.83	
JP	Syed Kazim Ali Merza	8,779	1.52	
Independent	Barin Ray	3,920	0.68	
Independent	Prince Scientist Bose	3,568	0.62	
Majority		68,755	11.87	
Turnout		591,337	80.31	
Swing to CPI(M) from JP		Swing		

=== 1977 ===
1977 Indian general election: Murshidabad
Party	Candidate	Votes	%	±%
JP	Syed Kazim Ali Meerza	140,927	40.05	
INC	Azizur Rahman	104,838	29.79	
Independent	Md. Serajul Islam	69,697	19.81	
SUCI(C)	Samsujjoha Biswas	28,480	8.09	
Independent	Barindra Nath Ray	4,596	1.31	
Independent	A. K. Hazikul Alam	3,377	0.96	
Majority		36,089	10.26	
Turnout		363,744	61.96	
Swing to JP from Independent		Swing		

=== 1971 ===
1971 Indian general election: Murshidabad
Party	Candidate	Votes	%	±%
Independent	Chowdhury Abu Taleb	93,716	34.38	
Independent	Syed Badrudduja	73,334	26.90	
Independent	Syed Kazim Ali Meerza	45,307	16.62	
ABJS	Krishnadas Chattopadhyay	43,641	16.01	
SSP	Sailendra Nath Adhicary	16,607	6.09	
Majority		20,382	7.48	
Turnout		287,999	57.75	
Independent hold		Swing		

=== 1967 ===
1967 Indian general election: Murshidabad
Party	Candidate	Votes	%	±%
Independent	S. Badrudduja	141,402	48.32	
INC	M. K. Bukhsh	126,436	43.21	
ABJS	K. Chattopadhyay	24,781	8.47	
Majority		14,966	5.11	
Turnout		306,654	63.87	
Independent hold		Swing		

=== 1962 ===
1962 Indian general election: Murshidabad
Party	Candidate	Votes	%	±%
Independent	Syed Badrudduja	102,067	47.01	
INC	Abdus Sattar	82,231	37.88	
HM	Ananda Gopal Chattopadhyaya	22,443	10.34	
Independent	Arup Kumar Acharyya	10,362	4.77	
Majority		19,836	9.13	
Turnout		226,548	46.57	
Swing to Independent from INC		Swing		

=== 1957 ===
1957 Indian general election: Murshidabad
Party	Candidate	Votes	%	±%
Independent		85,041	41.93	
PSP	Abu K. M. Zakaria	80,646	39.76	
Independent	Biswanath Roy	37,135	18.31	
Majority		4,395	2.17	
Turnout		202,822	47.95	
INC hold		Swing		

=== 1951 ===
1951–52 Indian general election: Murshidabad
Party	Candidate	Votes	%	±%
INC	Muhammed Khuda Bukhsh	124,892	66.90	
Independent	Dhirendra Nath Rai	52,661	28.21	
Independent	Dwijapada Sarkar	9,131	4.89	
Majority		72,231	38.69	
Turnout		186,684	49.07	
INC win (new seat)				

== See also ==
- Murshidabad
- List of constituencies of the Lok Sabha
- 1972 Murshidabad by-election
