= Murshidabad Assembly constituency =

Murshidabad
- Constituency No. 64 for the West Bengal Legislative Assembly
- Interactive Map Outlining Murshidabad Assembly Constituency

Constituency details
- Country: India
- Region: East India
- State: West Bengal
- District: Murshidabad
- Lok Sabha constituency: Murshidabad
- Established: 1951
- Total electors: 268,221
- Reservation: None

Member of Legislative Assembly
- 18th West Bengal Legislative Assembly
- Incumbent Gouri Shankar Ghosh
- Party: BJP
- Alliance: NDA
- Elected year: 2026

Murshidabad Assembly constituency is an assembly constituency in Murshidabad district in the Indian state of West Bengal.

Most Successful parties from Murshidabad assembly
1. Indian National Congress (9 times) (50.0%)
2. All India Forward Bloc (5 times) (27.8%)
3. Independent politician (2 times) (11.1%)
4. Bharatiya Janata Party (2 times) (11.1%)

== Overview ==
As per orders of the Delimitation Commission, No. 64 Murshidabad Assembly constituency covers Murshidabad municipality, Jiaganj Azimganj municipality and Murshidabad Jiaganj community development block

Murshidabad Assembly constituency is part of No. 11 Murshidabad Lok Sabha constituency.

== Members of the Legislative Assembly ==
Year	Name	Party
1951	Durgapada Sinha	Indian National Congress
1957	Durgapada Sinha	Indian National Congress
1962	Birendra Narayan Roy	Independent politician
1967	S.K.A. Mirza	Indian National Congress
1969	Mohammad Idris Ali	Indian National Congress
1971	Mohammad Idris Ali	Indian National Congress
1972	Mohammad Idris Ali	Indian National Congress
1977	Chhaya Ghosh	All India Forward Bloc
1982	Chhaya Ghosh	All India Forward Bloc
1987	Abdul Mannan Hossain	Indian National Congress
1991	Chhaya Ghosh	All India Forward Bloc
1996	Mazammel Haque	Independent politician
2001	Chhaya Ghosh	All India Forward Bloc
2006	Bivas Chakraborty	All India Forward Bloc
2011	Shaoni Singha Roy	Indian National Congress
2016	Shaoni Singha Roy	Indian National Congress
2021	Gouri Shankar Ghosh	Bharatiya Janata Party
2026	Gouri Shankar Ghosh	Bharatiya Janata Party

== Election results ==
=== 2026 ===
2026 West Bengal Legislative Assembly election: Murshidabad
Party	Candidate	Votes	%	±%
BJP	Gouri Shankar Ghosh	114,443	48.18	▲6.32
AITC	Shaoni Singha Roy	82,922	34.91	▼5.87
INC	Ali Siddiqui	16,124	6.79	▼5.79
AIFB	Abdul Mannan	9,074	3.82	
AJUP	Mir Hasnat Ali	7,899	3.33	
SUCI(C)	Milia Sajem	2,247	0.95	
NOTA	None of the above	1,442	0.61	▼0.66
Majority		31,521	13.27	▲12.19
Turnout		237,534	95.52	▲10.06
BJP hold		Swing		

=== 2021 ===
West Bengal assembly elections, 2021: Murshidabad
Party	Candidate	Votes	%	±%
BJP	Gouri Shankar Ghosh	95,967	41.86	▲29.91
AITC	Shaoni Singha Roy	93,476	40.78	▲6.26
INC	Sheikh Nejauddin	28,835	12.58	▼34.44
Independent	Bellal Sk	2,278	0.99	
NOTA	None of the above	2,904	1.27	
Majority		2,491	1.08	
Turnout		229,231	85.46	
BJP gain from INC		Swing		

=== 2016 ===
West Bengal assembly elections, 2016: Murshidabad
Party	Candidate	Votes	%	±%
INC	Shaoni Singha Roy	94,579	47.02	▲0.99
AITC	Ashim Krishna Bhatta	69,440	34.52	New
BJP	Gouri Shankar Ghosh	24,031	11.95	▲5.88
AIFB	Bivas Chakraborty	5,066	2.52	▼39.63
NOTA	None of the Above	2,966	1.47	New
Majority		25,139	12.5	▲8.62
Turnout		2,01,150	85.58	▼1.34
INC hold		Swing	{{{swing}}}	

=== 2011 ===
In the 2011 election, Shaoni Singha Roy of Congress defeated her nearest rival Bibhas Chakraborty of Forward Bloc.

West Bengal assembly elections, 2011: Murshidabad constituency
Party	Candidate	Votes	%	±%
INC	Shaoni Singha Roy	75,441	46.03	
AIFB	Bibhas Chakraborty	69,089	42.15	−6.83
BJP	Ranajit Kumar Das	9,946	6.07	
Independent	Shyamal Krishna Das	4,495		
PDS	Md. Kashimuddin Shaikh	2,753		
SUCI	Gulshenara Iva	2,169		
Turnout		163,893	87.11	
INC gain from AIFB		Swing		

.# Congress did not contest the seat in 2006.

=== 2006 ===
In the 2006 state assembly elections, Bivas Chakraborty of Forward Bloc won the Murshidabad assembly seat defeating his nearest rival Joyanta Roy of IPFB. Contests in most years were multi cornered but only winners and runners are being mentioned. Chhaya Ghosh of Forward Bloc defeated Abdul Mannan Hossain, Independent, in 2001. Mazammel Haque, Independent, defeated Abdul Ohab Mondal of Congress in 1996, Chhaya Ghosh of Forward Bloc defeated Asak Ali of Congress in 1991. Abdul Mannan Hossain of Congress defeated Madan Mohan Ray, Independent, in 1987. Chhaya Ghosh of Forward Bloc defeated Dedar Bakshi of ICS in 1982 and Syed Nawab Jani Meerza of Janata Party in 1977.

=== 2001 ===
2001 West Bengal Legislative Assembly election: Murshidabad
Party	Candidate	Votes	%	±%
AIFB	Chhaya Ghosh	69,572	46.85	
Independent	Mannan Hossain	46,578	31.37	
Party for Democratic Socialism	Mozammel Haque	15,748	10.61	
AITC	Sagir Hossain	5,915	3.98	
BJP	Nimai Majumder	4,492	3.03	
Majority		22,994	15.48	
Turnout		148,493	79.59	
AIFB hold		Swing		

=== 1972 ===
Mohammad Idris Ali of Congress won in 1972, 1971 and 1969. S.K.A.Mirza of Congress won in 1967. Birendra Narayan Ray, Independent, won in 1962. Durgapada Sinha of Congress won in 1957 and in independent India's first election in 1951.
