= Moinul Hassan =

Member of the Parliament of India (born 1958)

- মইনুল হাসান

Member of Parliament, Rajya Sabha
- In office April 3, 2006 – April 2, 2012
- Succeeded by: Nadimul Haque
- Constituency: West Bengal

Member of Parliament, Lok Sabha
- In office 12 March 1998 – 16 May 2004
- Preceded by: Masudal Hossain Syed
- Succeeded by: Abdul Mannan Hossain
- Constituency: Murshidabad

Personal details
- Born: January 3, 1958 (age 68) Berhampore, West Bengal, India
- Party: Trinamool Congress (2018–present); Communist Party of India (Marxist) (1976–2018) (resigned and then expelled)
- Profession: Politician, social worker, writer

Moinul Hassan is a writer and politician from TMC and was a member of CPI(M) State Committee. He was a Member of the Parliament of India representing West Bengal in the Rajya Sabha, the upper house of the Indian Parliament.

== Political career ==
On 2 September 2015, while leading a political rally of CPI (M) at Berhampur, he was physically attacked by the police and local Trinamool Congress goons for opposing the Trinamool government.

During 2016 Assembly Polls he strongly advocated for an unified movement with secular anti-mamata forces in West Bengal. He joined All India Trinamool Congress on 21 July 2018.

== Books published ==
In Bengali:

- Muslim Samaj and Present Times (two parts), 2003
- Muslim Samaj: Kayekti Prasangik Alochona, 2003
- Pakisthan: Pratibeshir Andermahal, 2004
- Muslim Samaje Sangsker Andolan, 2005
- Indology: Past, Present and future, 2005
- China: Ekti Antarborty Pratibedan Edited
- Islam and Contemporary World, 2009
- Marx theke Gramsci, 2015
- Jukti, Torko, Bitarka, 2016
- Moulabad Sampradayikota Itihas Rachona Eboing Ei Samay (Foreword by Prof Irfan Habib), 2016
- Bangali Musolman Jibon O Sangoskriti, 2015
- Priyojoneshu, 2017
- Dharmo O Marxbad, 2018
