= Abdul Mannan Hossain =

Indian politician (1952–2017)

Member of Parliament, Lok Sabha
- In office 2004-2014
- Preceded by: Moinul Hassan
- Succeeded by: Badaruddoza Khan
- Constituency: Murshidabad

Legislator at West Bengal Legislative Assembly
- In office 1987-1991
- Preceded by: Chhaya Ghosh
- Succeeded by: Chhaya Ghosh
- Constituency: Murshidabad

Personal details
- Born: 15 October 1952 Murshidabad, West Bengal, India
- Died: 14 November 2017 (aged 65) Kolkata
- Party: Trinamool Congress (2014-2017); Indian National Congress (1981-2014)
- Spouse: Bulbul Begum
- Children: 2 sons (Abdul Soumik Hossain, Rajib Hossain) and 2 daughters

Abdul Mannan Hossain (1952–2017) was an Trinamool Congress and Indian National Congress politician. He was Vidhan Sabha member and Lok Sabha member.

== Early life ==
Abdul Mannan Hossain, son of Abdul Gafur and Khurma Beebi, was born on 15 October 1952 at Sealmara in Murshidabad district.

He graduated from R.K.N. College and became an educationist.

In 1971, he married Bulbul Begum they have two sons Rajib Hossain and Sowmik Hossain and two daughters.

== Political career ==
He was Zilla Parishad member in 1982–1984.

He was elected to the West Bengal State Assembly in 1987 from Murshidabad (Vidhan Sabha constituency).

He was elected to the Lok Sabha in 2004 and 2009 from Murshidabad (Lok Sabha constituency).

He joined the All India Trinamool Congress in September 2014.
