= Abu Raihan Biswas =

Indian politician (c.1940–2019)

West Bengal Legislative Assembly
- In office 1972–1977
- Preceded by: Aftabuddin Ahmed
- Succeeded by: Shaikh Imaijuddin
- Constituency: Hariharpara

Personal details
- Born: c. 1940
- Died: 29 December 2019 (aged 79)
- Party: Socialist Unity Centre of India

Abu Raihan Biswas (c. 1940 – 29 December 2019) was an Indian teacher and politician from West Bengal belonging to Socialist Unity Centre of India. He was a legislator of the West Bengal Legislative Assembly.

== Biography ==
Biswas was a high school teacher. He was elected as a member of the West Bengal Legislative Assembly from Hariharpara in 1972.

Biswas also contested from Hariharpara in 1977 and he lost to Shaikh Imaijuddin. He took part in 7th Lok Sabha election from Murshidabad but did not win.

Biswas died on 29 December 2019 at the age of 79.
