= 1972 Murshidabad by-election =

1972 Murshidabad Lok Sabha seat by-election
Candidate	Muhammad Khoda Baksh	S. Badrudduja
Party	INC	Independent

In March 15, 1972 a by-election was held in for the Murshidabad seat in the Lok Sabha (lower house of the parliament of India). The by-election was called after the death of the sitting Member of Parliament Chowdhury Abu Taleb.

The election was won by Muhammad Khoda Baksh of the Indian National Congress (I).
