= Mahua Moitra =

Indian politician (born 1974)

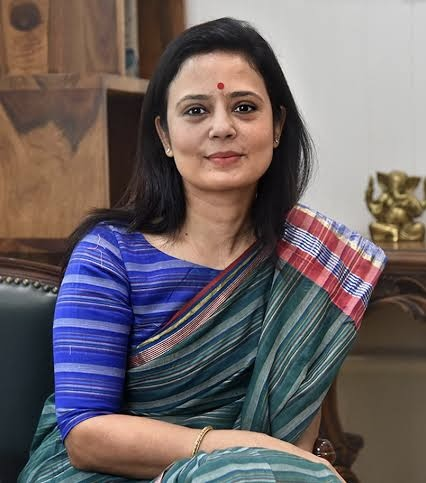
- Moitra in 2024

Member of Parliament, Lok Sabha
- Incumbent
- Assumed office 4 June 2024
- Preceded by: Herself
- Constituency: Krishnanagar, West Bengal
- In office 23 May 2019 – 8 December 2023
- Preceded by: Tapas Paul
- Succeeded by: Herself
- Constituency: Krishnanagar, West Bengal

Member of West Bengal Legislative Assembly
- In office 28 May 2016 – 23 May 2019
- Preceded by: Samaredranath Ghosh
- Succeeded by: Bimalendu Sinha Roy
- Constituency: Karimpur

Personal details
- Born: 12 October 1974 (age 52) Labac, Assam, India
- Party: Trinamool Congress (until 2026); Mamata All India Trinamool Congress (from 2026)
- Other political affiliations: Indian National Congress (2008–2010)
- Spouses: Lars Brorson (divorced); Pinaki Misra (m. 2025)
- Education: Mount Holyoke College
- Occupation: Investment banker; politician

Mahua Moitra (Bengali pronunciation: [mohua moi̯tro]; born 12 October 1974) is an Indian politician and former investment banker. She is known for her fiery speeches in the Parliament of India. She won the 2019 Indian general election as a Trinamool Congress (TMC) party candidate from Krishnanagar and served as a Member of Parliament, Lok Sabha from 2019 to 2023 until being expelled. She was re-elected to parliament in the 2024 Indian general election.

Moitra served as a member of the West Bengal Legislative Assembly representing Karimpur from 2016 to 2019, and served as the general secretary and national spokesperson of the AITC. On 13 November 2023, Moitra was appointed AITC District President of Krishnanagar (Nadia North). She was an investment banker at JPMorgan Chase before entering politics. Moitra was disqualified and expelled from the Lok Sabha on 8 December 2023 following the recommendation of the Lok Sabha Ethics Committee in a cash-for-query case for sharing her login and password of the NIC portal.

Moitra has been a strong supporter of the Muslim minority rights in India. In 2019, Moitra was one of the fierce opponents of the Citizenship (Amendment) Act (CAA) claiming that the law unfairly targeted the Muslim community. Along with the Indian Union Muslim League (IUML), Moitra moved the Supreme Court challenging the validity of the CAA. In 2026, Moitra petitioned the Calcutta High Court to advocate for Muslims' rights of animal sacrifice.

Moitra has been one of the most vocal critics of Bharatiya Janata Party (BJP). BJP leaders charge Moitra and her party, TMC, with Muslim appeasement, pointing to her silence on the issue of violence against Hindus in Bangladesh. Earlier in 2017, Moitra filed a police complaint against a BJP leader for insulting her during a TV debate, but the court rejected those charges.

== Early life and education ==
Moitra was born to Dwipendra Lal Moitra on 12 October 1974 in Labac in the Cachar district of Assam. She hails from a Bengali Hindu Brahmin family and has a sister.

Moitra earned Bachelor of Arts in economics and mathematics in 1998 from Mount Holyoke College South Hadley in Massachusetts, United States.

== Career ==
=== Corporate career ===
Moitra worked as an investment banker for JPMorgan Chase in New York City and as vice-president in its London office.

=== Political career ===
She quit her position as vice-president at JPMorgan Chase in London in 2009 to enter Indian politics. Subsequently, she joined the Indian Youth Congress, the youth wing of the Indian National Congress party where she was one of the trusted hands of Rahul Gandhi in the project "Aam Admi Ka Sipahi". In 2010, she moved to the All India Trinamool Congress party. She was elected from the Karimpur constituency in Nadia district, West Bengal in the Legislative Assembly elections held in 2016. She has been elected as a member of parliament to the 17th Lok Sabha from Krishnanagar, West Bengal.

On 13 November 2021, she was appointed TMC party's Goa in-charge to prepare the party for contesting the 2022 Goa Legislative Assembly election.

She won the Lok Sabha elections of 2024 by a margin of 56,705 votes and returned to parliament with a decisive victory.

In May 2026, Moitra, along with fellow Trinamool Congress MP Kirti Azad, announced her association with the Cockroach Janta Party, a satirical online political movement formed in response to controversial remarks by Chief Justice of India Surya Kant.

=== 2026 MPs Rebellion ===
Following the 2026 Assembly Elections, 20 out of the 28 Members of Parliament from Trinamool Congress decided to leave Mamata Banerjee and the Trinamool Congress. They formed a new group and decided to merge with a relatively little known National Party, the Nationalist Citizens Party of India and presented a representation in this regards to Lok Sabha Speaker Om Birla on 14 June 2026.

After this major split in the Trinamool Congress, only 8 Lok Sabha MPs remained loyal to Mamata Banerjee. The loyalist MPs included Abhishek Banerjee, Mahua Moitra, Saugata Roy, Kalyan Banerjee, Kirti Azad, Pratima Mondal and Sajda Ahmed.

The event is still unfolding.

== Political issues ==
=== Citizenship Amendment Act (CAA) 2019 ===
In December 2019, Moitra was one of the most vocal political opponents of the Citizenship (Amendment) Act, 2019 (CAA) in India, as she believed that the law violates the secular principles of the Indian Constitution and was unfair to Muslims. According to the CAA, the minorities from Pakistan, Bangladesh and Afghanistan and facing religious persecution including Hindu, Sikh, Buddhist, Jain, Parsi and Christian, will be given Indian citizenship, though the act does not provide such privilege to Muslims, as those countries are Muslim majority states. Along with the Indian Union Muslim League (IUML), Moitra moved the Supreme Court challenging the validity of the Citizenship Amendment Act.

=== Constitutional issues in 2021 ===
In 2021, Moitra criticised the judiciary and the current government in the parliament, targeting the former chief justice Ranjan Gogoi, who was accused of sexual harassment, and had accepted the nomination to the Rajya Sabha after his retirement. Her speech caused an uproar in the house, with members of the ruling party calling it 'objectionable' and violating parliamentary rules for mentioning a person in "high authority". Opposition members supported the speech because it was based on facts in the public record. BJP leaders Nishikant Dubey and P. P. Chaudhary moved a privilege notice against her and speaker Om Birla had her statements expunged.

=== R. G. Kar Medical College Rape Case (2024) ===
In August 2024, rape and murder of female medical student in Kolkata at the R. G. Kar Medical College and Hospital in West Bengal, the ruling TMC government was widely criticised for lapses regarding the security and safety of women in the state. The Indian Medical Association and BJP accused the Bengal government of being involved in the vandalism by "TMC goons" to destroy evidence. However, Moitra denied the allegations that her party was involved in any cover-up, calling such claims as incorrect.

=== Violence against Hindus in Bangladesh (2024 - 2025) ===
In December 2025, there were many protests in Kolkata in response to the lynching of Dipu Das in Bangladesh, who was a Hindu garment factory worker, who was burnt alive by a Muslim mob. Many BJP leaders, such as Suvendu Adhikari, strongly condemned it. Moitra and her party, TMC maintained silence on the lynching of Dipu Das and the violence against Hindus in Bangladesh which was severely criticised by the BJP.

=== Support for TMC candidate, Jahangir Khan (2026) ===
In April 2026, during the 2026 West Bengal state elections, police officer Ajay Pal Sharma issued a stern warning and visited the house of TMC candidate Jahangir Khan, who was accused of threatening voters in the Falta Assembly constituency. According to several reports, Khan's supporters threatened local women with gang rape. TMC and Moitra supported Jahangir Khan and blamed Sharma for intimidating their party workers.

=== Muslim's rights for animal sacrifice on Eid 2026 ===
In May 2026, Mahua Moitra came out in support of Muslim's rights for animal sacrifice on Eid and challenged the recent curbs on cattle slaughter by the Bengal BJP government. On 13 May 2026, the BJP state government enforced the Animal Slaughter Control Act, 1950, restricting the slaughter of cattle without a fitness certificate. The notification also prohibited the slaughter of animals, including cows and buffaloes, in public places. Moita opposed this notification, arguing that it would adversely affect Muslims observing Eid, and moved a petition before the Calcutta High Court against it. Moitra also asserted that Muslims' animal sacrifice should be exempted from the Animal Cruelty Act 1960. Further, Moitra opposed the restrictions on cow slaughter, arguing that the Muslim community should be allowed to freely sacrifice any cattle in public as per their customs.

=== Other issues ===
In June 2019, Moitra pointed out "seven early signs of fascism", which she said were present in India under Narendra Modi's government. She said that constitution on which every MP had sworn to protect was under threat. On 7 April 2022, Moitra argued in the parliament that the Criminal Procedure (Identification) Bill, 2022 is even more intrusive than colonial surveillance laws in India.

Moitra has supported Rahul Gandhi in his attacks on industrialist Gautam Adani, and businesses of the Adani Group. She has raised concerns regarding the international reports on the Adani Group.

In October 2025, Moitra faced criticism after replying "I agree" to post shared on X that described Indians in derogatory and racist terms. The response was criticised by the Bhartiya Janta Party in West Bengal. Moitra later responded by calling the reply "a mistake."

On 19 August 2026, a court issued an arrest warrant against Moitra for making sentences against the Hindu community that hurt the religious sentiments.

The case pertains to the following sections -

- Section 79 - Insulting the modesty of a woman.
- Section 196 - Promoting enmity between different groups.
- Section 299 - Deliberately outraging religious feelings.
- Section 351 - Criminal Indimidation.
- Section 353(2) - Promoting or delivering hate speech.

of the Bhartiya Nyaya Sanhita.

== Ethics based Expulsion from Parliament (2023) ==
In October 2023, BJP MP from Jharkhand Nishikant Dubey and Supreme Court advocate Jai Anant Dehadrai sent a complaint to CBI with an FIR against Moitra and submitted a copy to the speaker Om Birla and their Ethics Committee in Lok Sabha. They accused Moitra of having received money from Darshan Hiranandani to ask parliamentary questions targeting Adani. On 19 October 2023, Hiranandani turned approver, and submitted an affidavit.

Moitra denied these allegations and stated that she welcomes any kind of enquiry from CBI and parliamentary ethics committee. Moitra admitted that she had shared her NIC portal login details with Hiranandani who was a friend and other people related to her own office, but denied accepting cash for any query raised in the Parliament. She claimed that Hiranandani made these allegations either under duress or for reward.

In November 2023, the parliamentary ethics panel recommended her dismissal from Lok Sabha on grounds that she had received gifts and favours from Hiranandani. On 8 December 2023, the Lok Sabha voted to expel Moitra from the membership of the house as per the recommended in report by the Parliamentary Committee on Ethics. Moitra approached the Supreme Court challenging her expulsion. She was re-elected to parliament in the 2024 Indian general election.

== Lawsuits ==
In January 2017, Babul Supriyo, then a BJP leader, asked Moitra whether she was intoxicated in a national television debate, and Moitra filed a police complaint against Supriyo for allegedly insulting her modesty, and demanded his arrest. In the debate, Supriyo had said, ‘Mahua, are you on mohua?’ (mahua flowers are also used for alcohol). The Calcutta High Court dismissed the charge sheet filed by Kolkata Police against Supriyo for allegedly trying to outrage the modesty of Mohua Moitra, "holding no such offence was committed by the accused." A few days later, Babul Supriyo sent legal notice to Moitra for allegedly defaming him by accusing him of being involved in the Rose Valley ponzi firm scam.

In 2020, she filed a defamation suit against Zee Media and the company also filed a counter lawsuit for defamation against her for apparently making derogatory statements against the channel while addressing reporters. She was granted bail and put on trial by a Delhi Court. She later won the case and the charges against her were dismissed while the case she had filed has remained pending.

On 5 July 2022 at the India Today Conclave East, while reacting to a film poster showing goddess Kali smoking a cigarette, Moitra said, "Kaali to me is a meat-eating, alcohol-accepting goddess. You have the freedom to imagine your goddess. There are some places where whiskey is offered to gods and in some other places it would be blasphemy." Police complaints were filed against her by the Bengal BJP in Kolkata and five districts of West Bengal, as well as in Bhopal, Madhya Pradesh. Her party All India Trinamool Congress distanced itself and issuing a statement — "Her views expressed on Goddess Kali have been made in her personal capacity and are not endorsed by the party."

== Personal life ==
Moitra was married to Danish financier Lars Brorson, with whom she later divorced. She was in a relationship with advocate Jai Anant Dehadrai for about three years.

In May 2025, Moitra married Odisha's BJD ex-MP Pinaki Misra in Germany.

Lok Sabha
Preceded by Tapas Paul	Member of Parliament for Krishnanagar; 2019	Incumbent
State Legislative Assembly
Preceded by Samaredranath Ghosh	Member of the West Bengal Legislative Assembly from Karimpur Assembly constituency 2016 – 2019	Succeeded by Bimalendu Sinha Roy
Party political offices
Preceded by Office established	In charge All India Trinamool Congress, Goa; 13 November 2021 – 4 May 2022	Succeeded by Kirti Azad
