= Karimpur Assembly constituency =

Karimpur
- Constituency No. 77 for the West Bengal Legislative Assembly
- Interactive Map Outlining Karimpur Assembly Constituency

Constituency details
- Country: India
- Region: East India
- State: West Bengal
- District: Nadia
- Lok Sabha constituency: Murshidabad
- Established: 1951
- Total electors: 251,039
- Reservation: None

Member of Legislative Assembly
- 18th West Bengal Legislative Assembly
- Incumbent Samarendranath Ghosh
- Party: BJP
- Alliance: NDA
- Elected year: 2026

Karimpur Assembly constituency is an assembly constituency in Nadia district in the Indian state of West Bengal.

== Overview ==
In line with the Delimitation Commission, No. 77 Karimpur Assembly constituency is composed of Karimpur I community development block and Dhoradaha I, Dhoradaha II, Murutia, Natidanga I, Natidanga II and Rahamatpur gram panchayats of Karimpur II CD Block.

Karimpur Assembly constituency is part of No. 11 Murshidabad Lok Sabha constituency.

== Members of the Legislative Assembly ==
Year	Name	Party
1951	Haripada Chattopadhyay	Kisan Mazdoor Praja Party
1957	Bijoy Lal Chattopadhyay	Indian National Congress
1962	Smarajit Bandopadhyay	Indian National Congress
1967	Nalinaksha Sanyal	Bangla Congress
1969	Nalinaksha Sanyal	Indian National Congress
1971	Samarendra Nath Sanyal	Communist Party of India (Marxist)
1972	Arabinda Mandal	Indian National Congress
1977	Samarendra Nath Sanyal	Communist Party of India (Marxist)
1982	Chitta Ranjan Biswas	Communist Party of India (Marxist)
1987	Chitta Ranjan Biswas	Communist Party of India (Marxist)
1991	Chitta Ranjan Biswas	Communist Party of India (Marxist)
1996	Chitta Ranjan Biswas	Communist Party of India (Marxist)
2001	Prafulla Kumar Bhowmick	Communist Party of India (Marxist)
2006	Prafulla Kumar Bhowmick	Communist Party of India (Marxist)
2011	Samarendranath Ghosh	Communist Party of India (Marxist)
2016	Mahua Moitra	Trinamool Congress
2019^	Bimalendu Sinha Roy	Trinamool Congress
2021	Bimalendu Sinha Roy	Trinamool Congress
2026	Samarendranath Ghosh	Bharatiya Janata Party

- ^ denotes by-election

== Election results ==
Vote share of Winning candidates
2026	43.68%
2021	50.07%
2019^	50.43%
2016	45.24%
2011	46.17%
2006	47.18%
2001	46.82%
1996	47.56%
1991	47.63%
1987	55.04%
1982	54.86%
1977	43.36%
1972	60.98%
1971	47.65%
1969	33.72%
1967	68.95%
1962	47.30%
1957	55.99%
1951	48.44%

=== 2026 ===
2026 West Bengal Legislative Assembly election: Karimpur
Party	Candidate	Votes	%	±%
BJP	Samarendranath Ghosh	105,234	43.68	+4.25
AITC	Soham Chakraborty	95,049	39.45	−10.62
CPI(M)	Prabhas Majumdar	19,334	8.03	+0.27
INC	Pooja Roy Chowdhury	10,854	4.51	
AJUP	Samsun Nahar Khatun Sekh	5,733	2.38	
NOTA	None of the above	1,140	0.47	−0.13
Majority		10,185	4.23	−6.41
Turnout		240,916	94.92	+6.68
BJP gain from AITC		Swing		

=== 2021 ===
West Bengal legislative Assembly elections, 2021: Karimpur
Party	Candidate	Votes	%	±%
AITC	Bimalendu Sinha Roy	110,911	50.07	
BJP	Samarendranath Ghosh	87,336	39.43	
CPI(M)	Pravas Majumdar	17,185	7.76	
NOTA	None of the above	1,328	0.6	
Majority		23,575	10.64	
Turnout		221,506	88.24	

=== 2019 ===
Bye-election, 2019: Karimpur
Party	Candidate	Votes	%	±%
AITC	Bimalendu Sinha Roy	1,03,278	50.43	+5.19
BJP	Jayprakash Majumdar	79,368	38.75	+27.16
CPI(M)	Golam Rabbi	18,627	9.09	−28.20
NOTA	None of the above	1,568	0.77	+0.05
Majority		23,910	11.68	+4.09
Turnout		2,04,807	84.72	−4.00
Registered electors		2,40,000		

Due to Mahua Moitra resignation as MLA, By poll was held. Bimalendu Sinha Roy won by 24,119 votes

=== 2016 ===
2016 West Bengal Legislative Assembly election: Karimpur
Party	Candidate	Votes	%	±%
AITC	Mahua Moitra	90,989	45.24	
CPI(M)	Samarendranath Ghosh	75,000	37.29	
BJP	Subhasis Bhattacharyya (Ananda)	23,302	11.59	
SS	Mahitosh Sarkar	4,554	2.26	
WPOI	Sahabuddin Mandal	2,140	1.06	
BSP	Jitendra Nath Halder	1,769	0.88	
NOTA	None of the Above	1,449	0.72	
SUCI(C)	Azad Rahaman	1,104	0.55	
IUML	Rejaul Sekh	799	0.40	
Majority		15,989	7.95	
Turnout		201,106	88.53	
Swing to AITC from CPI(M)		Swing		

=== 2011 ===
2011 West Bengal Legislative Assembly election: Karimpur
Party	Candidate	Votes	%	±%
CPI(M)	Samarendranath Ghosh	82,244	46.17	
AITC	Dr. Ramendra Nath Sarkar	77,159	43.32	
BJP	Indrajit Mondal	8,098	4.55	
Independent	Rajib Sekh	3,626	2.04	
BSP	Swapan Kumar Biswas	2,628	1.48	
Independent	Bikash Chandra Biswas	2,054	1.15	
IUML	Rejaul Sekh	1,446	0.81	
PDCI	Abdulla Biswas	863	0.48	
Majority		5,085	2.85	
Turnout		178,118	90.62	
CPI(M) hold		Swing		

=== 2006 ===
2006 West Bengal Legislative Assembly election: Karimpur
Party	Candidate	Votes	%	±%
CPI(M)	Prafulla Kumar Bhowmick	74,036	47.18	
INC	Arabinda Mandal	54,161	34.51	
AITC	Chira Ranjan Mandal	20,298	12.93	
Independent	Azad Sekh	5,158	3.29	
BSP	Jitendranath Halder	3,286	2.09	
Majority		19,875	12.67	
Turnout		156,939		
CPI(M) hold		Swing		

=== 2001 ===
2001 West Bengal Legislative Assembly election: Karimpur
Party	Candidate	Votes	%	±%
CPI(M)	Prafulla Kumar Bhowmick	62,398	46.82	
AITC	Chira Ranjan Mondal	55,580	41.71	
BJP	Tapan Baran Mitra	11,137	8.36	
Independent	Azad Seikh	4,147	3.11	
Majority		6,818	5.11	
Turnout		133,537	80.68	
CPI(M) hold		Swing		

=== 1996 ===
1996 West Bengal Legislative Assembly election: Karimpur
Party	Candidate	Votes	%	±%
CPI(M)	Chittaranjan Biswas	64,561	47.56	
INC	Chira Ranjan Mandal	44,215	32.57	
BJP	Nabakumar Mondal	24,865	18.32	
Independent	Asutosh Pal	1,181	0.87	
Independent	Iman Mondal	342	0.25	
Independent	Sudhansu Kumar Biswas	299	0.22	
AIIC(T)	Tamesh Pal	291	0.21	
Majority		20,346	14.99	
Turnout		138,370	86.94	
CPI(M) hold		Swing		

=== 1991 ===
1991 West Bengal Legislative Assembly election: Karimpur
Party	Candidate	Votes	%	±%
CPI(M)	Chitta Ranjan Biswas	53,349	47.63	
INC	Chira Ranjan Mandal	33,316	29.74	
BJP	Karuan Kumar Saha	22,892	20.44	
JP	Abdur Rashid Biswas	1,372	1.22	
Independent	Dhanapati Mandal	581	0.52	
Independent	Rakebuddin Mandal	498	0.44	
Majority		20,033	17.89	
Turnout		114,221	81.94	
CPI(M) hold		Swing		

=== 1987 ===
1987 West Bengal Legislative Assembly election: Karimpur
Party	Candidate	Votes	%	±%
CPI(M)	Biswas Chittaranjan (Anandapally)	51,941	55.04	
INC	Arabinda Mandal	41,865	44.37	
Independent	Chittaranjan Biswas (Rahamatpur Colony)	556	0.59	
Majority		10,076	10.67	
Turnout		96,303	85.08	
CPI(M) hold		Swing		

=== 1982 ===
1982 West Bengal Legislative Assembly election: Karimpur
Party	Candidate	Votes	%	±%
CPI(M)	Chittaranjan Biswas	46,135	54.86	
INC	Arabinda Mandal	37,961	45.14	
Majority		8,174	9.72	
Turnout		85,585	88.16	
CPI(M) hold		Swing		

=== 1977 ===
1977 West Bengal Legislative Assembly election: Karimpur
Party	Candidate	Votes	%	±%
CPI(M)	Samarendra Nath Sanyal	23,905	43.36	
INC	Arabindra Mandal	12,147	22.03	
JP	Naresh Narayan Biswas	8,769	15.90	
Independent	Nalinaksha Sanyal	4,208	7.63	
Independent	Sudhansu Sekhar Biswas	3,348	6.07	
IUML	Hazi Abuzar Ghaffari Mondal	2,757	5.00	
Majority		11,758	21.33	
Turnout		56,178	72.81	
Swing to CPI(M) from INC		Swing		

=== 1972 ===
1972 West Bengal Legislative Assembly election: Karimpur
Party	Candidate	Votes	%	±%
INC	Arabinda Mandal	27,557	60.98	
CPI(M)	Samarendra Nath Sanyal	16,019	35.45	
Independent	Kazi Saidul Islam Biswas	1,611	3.57	
Majority		11,538	25.53	
Turnout		46,463	63.26	
Swing to INC from CPI(M)		Swing		

=== 1971 ===
1971 West Bengal Legislative Assembly election: Karimpur
Party	Candidate	Votes	%	±%
CPI(M)	Samarendra Nath Sanyal	22,489	47.65	
INC	Nalinaksha Sanyal	11,143	23.61	
WBSML	Hazi Abuzar Ghaffari Mondal	9,649	20.44	
Bangla Congress	Sunil Ranjan Biswas	2,704	5.73	
INC(O)	Naresh Narayan Biswas	1,212	2.57	
Majority		11,346	24.04	
Turnout		50,000	69.17	
Swing to CPI(M) from INC		Swing		

=== 1969 ===
1969 West Bengal Legislative Assembly election: Karimpur
Party	Candidate	Votes	%	±%
INC	Nalinaksha Sanyal	16,248	33.72	
CPI(M)	Samarendra Nath Sanyal	16,198	33.61	
Independent	Sankardas Banerji	14,506	30.10	
PBI	Mohan Kali Biswas	1,235	2.56	
Majority		50	0.11	
Turnout		49,704	73.96	
Swing to INC from Bangla Congress		Swing		

=== 1967 ===
1967 West Bengal Legislative Assembly election: Karimpur
Party	Candidate	Votes	%	±%
Bangla Congress	N. Sanyal	32,144	68.95	
INC	S. Banerjee	10,436	22.39	
Independent	N. N. Biswas	4,038	8.66	
Majority		21,708	46.56	
Turnout		50,357	75.39	
Swing to Bangla Congress from INC		Swing		

=== 1962 ===
1962 West Bengal Legislative Assembly election: Karimpur
Party	Candidate	Votes	%	±%
INC	Samarajit Bandyopadhyay	18,342	47.30	
Independent	Nalinaksha Sanyal	15,790	40.72	
Independent	Biswanath Agarwalla	3,254	8.39	
ABJS	Sahadeb Biswas	1,389	3.58	
Majority		2,552	6.58	
Turnout		41,958	54.25	
INC hold		Swing		

=== 1957 ===
1957 West Bengal Legislative Assembly election: Karimpur
Party	Candidate	Votes	%	±%
INC	Bijoy Lal Chattopadhyay	17,035	55.99	
Independent	Satyendra Nath Choudhury	5,714	18.78	
PSP	Haripada Chattopadhyay	3,359	11.04	
Independent	Mrigendra Mohan Ray	2,683	8.82	
Independent	Lakshmi Narayan Biswas	1,078	3.54	
Independent	Nirendra Nath Roy	555	1.82	
Majority		11,321	37.21	
Turnout		30,424	51.14	
Swing to INC from KMPP		Swing		

=== 1951 ===
1951 West Bengal Legislative Assembly election: Karimpur
Party	Candidate	Votes	%	±%
KMPP	Haripada Chatterjee	9,050	48.44	
INC	Tarak Das Bandopadhya	7,832	41.92	
Independent	Nirendra Nath Roy	1,247	6.67	
Independent	Haran Chandra Sarkar	553	2.96	
Majority		1,218	6.52	
Turnout		18,682	34.33	
KMPP win (new seat)				
