= Hariharpara Assembly constituency =

Hariharpara
- Constituency No. 73 for the West Bengal Legislative Assembly
- Interactive Map Outlining Hariharpara Assembly Constituency

Constituency details
- Country: India
- Region: East India
- State: West Bengal
- District: Murshidabad
- Lok Sabha constituency: Murshidabad
- Established: 1951
- Total electors: 247,421
- Reservation: None

Member of Legislative Assembly
- 18th West Bengal Legislative Assembly
- Incumbent Niamot Sheikh
- Party: Democratic Trinamool Congress
- Elected year: 2026

Hariharpara Assembly constituency is an assembly constituency in Murshidabad district in the Indian state of West Bengal.

== Overview ==
As per orders of the Delimitation Commission Hariharpara Vidhan Sabha constituency covers Hariharpara community development block and Chhaighari and Madanpur gram panchayats of Berhampore community development block.

This constituency is part of No. 11 Murshidabad (Lok Sabha constituency).

== Members of the Legislative Assembly ==
Year	Name	Party
1951	Haji A. Hameed	Indian National Congress
1957	Haji A. Hameed	Indian National Congress
1962	Abdul Latif	Indian National Congress
1967	S. Ahmed	Indian National Congress
1969	Aftabuddin Ahmed	Progressive Muslim League
1971	Aftabuddin Ahmed	Independent politician
1972	Abu Raihan Biswas	Socialist Unity Centre of India (Communist)
1977	Shaikh Imajuddin	Indian National Congress
1982	Shaikh Imajuddin	Indian National Congress
1987	Mozammel Haque	Communist Party of India (Marxist)
1991	Mozammel Haque	Communist Party of India (Marxist)
1996	Mozammel Haque	Communist Party of India (Marxist)
2001	Niamot Sheikh	Independent politician
2006	Insar Ali Biswas	Communist Party of India (Marxist)
2011	Insar Ali Biswas	Communist Party of India (Marxist)
2016	Niamot Sheikh	Trinamool Congress
2021	Niamot Sheikh	Trinamool Congress
2026	Niamot Sheikh	Trinamool Congress

== Election results ==
=== 2026 ===
West Bengal assembly elections, 2026: Hariharpara constituency
Party	Candidate	Votes	%	±%
AITC	Niamot Sheikh	80,338	34.14	−13.37
AJUP	Bijoy Sekh	67,673	28.76	
BJP	Tanmay Biswas	32,057	13.62	+5.11
CPI(M)	Jamir Molla	30,055	12.77	
INC	Mousumi Begum	13,076	5.56	−35.44
SUCI(C)	Abu Syeed Khandoker	3,624	1.54	
IUML	Riyajul Islam Khan	2,725	1.16	
NOTA	None of the above	1,300	0.55	+0.03
Majority		12,665	5.38	−1.13
Turnout		235,296	95.78	+8.45
AITC hold		Swing		

=== 2021 ===
West Bengal assembly elections, 2021: Hariharpara constituency
Party	Candidate	Votes	%	±%
AITC	Niamot Sheikh	102,660	47.51	
INC	Alamgir Mir (Palash)	88,594	41.0	
BJP	Tanmoy Biswas	18,378	8.51	
NOTA	None of the above	1,117	0.52	
Majority		14,066	6.51	
Turnout		216,075	87.33	
AITC hold		Swing		

=== 2016 ===
In the 2016 election, Niamot Sheikh of Trinamool Congress defeated his nearest rival Alamgir Mir of Congress.

West Bengal assembly elections, 2016: Hariharpara constituency
Party	Candidate	Votes	%	±%
AITC	Niamot Sheikh	71,502	37.77	▲6.09
INC	Alamgir Mir (Palash)	66,499	35.13	New
CPI(M)	Insar Ali Biswas	39,057	20.63	▼14.93
BJP	Tulsi Prasad Sukul	5,394	2.85	▲0.05
SUCI(C)	Golam Mostafa	2,804	1.48	New
IUML	Asgar Ali Sheikh	1,382	0.73	New
NOTA	None of the Above	1,159	0.61	New
Majority		5,003	2.64	▼1.24
Turnout		1,89,291	86.71	▼3.58
AITC gain from CPI(M)		Swing	▲5.05	

=== 2011 ===
In the 2011 election, Insar Ali Biswas of CPI(M) defeated his nearest rival Niamot Sheikh of Trinamool Congress.

West Bengal assembly elections, 2011: Hariharpara constituency
Party	Candidate	Votes	%	±%
CPI(M)	Insar Ali Biswas	58,293	35.56	−9.58
AITC	Niamot Sheikh	51,935	31.68	−14.63#
Independent/Adhir Ranjan Chowdhury supported	Alamgir Mir (Palash)	44,982	27.44	
BJP	Bishnu Charan Sikdar	4,583	2.80	
SDPI	Masudul Islam	1,929		
Independent	Sufal Haldar	1,351		
MLKSC	Sattar Sekh	846		
Turnout		163,919	90.37	
CPI(M) hold		Swing	+5.05#	

Alamgir Mir, contesting as an independent, was a rebel Congress candidate, supported by the Baharampur MP, Adhir Chowdhury.

.# Swing calculated on Congress+Trinamool Congress vote percentages in 2006 taken together.

=== 2006 ===
In the 2006 state assembly elections Insar Ali Biswas of CPI(M) won the Hariharpara assembly seat defeating his nearest rival Niamot Sheikh of Congress. Contests in most years were multi cornered but only winners and runners are being mentioned. Niamot Sheikh, Independent, defeated Nizamuddin of CPI(M) in 2001. Mozammel Haque of CPI(M) defeated Mannan Hossain of Congress in 1996, Khaanarul Hossain of Congress in 1991, and Shaikh Imajuddin of Congress in 1987. Shaikh Imajuddin of Congress defeated Mozammel Haque of CPI(M) in 1982 and Abu Raihan Biswas of SUC in 1977.

=== 1972 ===
Abu Raihan Biswas of SUC won in 1972. Aftabuddin Ahmed, Independent, won in 1971. Aftabuddin Ahmed of Progressive Muslim League won in 1969. S.Ahmed of Congress won in 1967. Abdul Latif of Congress won in 1962. Haji A. Hameed of Congress won in 1957 and in independent India's first election in 1951.
