= Institute of Mass Communication Film and Television Studies =

- Type: Private
- Established: 2002; 24 years ago
- Affiliations: University of Kalyani; UGC
- President: Pabitra Sarkar
- Location: 261, 12, Prince Anwar Shah Rd, Rajendra Prasad Colony, Tollygunge, Kolkata-700033, West Bengal; 22.5013753°N 88.3518965°E
- Website: imcfts.com
- Location within Kolkata Location within India

The Institute of Mass Communication Film and Television Studies (IMCFTS) is an institute of mass communication, journalism and film studies in Prince Anwar Shah Road, Kolkata. It is affiliated with Kalyani University and is approved by the University Grants Commission.

== Institutional objective ==
The institution was created by Pabitra Sarkar (ex-vice chancellor of Rabindra Bharati University and Vice-Chairman, West Bengal State Council for Higher Education) in the year 2002 in Kolkata, West Bengal. It is primarily a non-profit organization whose main aim is to provide education in the fields of journalism and mass communication, coupled with film studies, as per the institute's stated objective.

== Courses offered ==
- MA in Mass Communication and Community Journalism (2 years)
- B.A. (Honors) in Media Studies
- PG diploma in Mass Communication and Journalism (1 year)
- PG diploma in Film and Television Studies (production-based)
- Practical Training FaCilities on Journalism
- Videography and Non-linear Editing Training
- Event Management and PR (Public Relations) Course

== Governing body ==
The governing body consists of people from the West Bengal council of Higher Education, Calcutta University, Jadavpur University, Netaji Subhas Open University, Visva Bharati University, Doordarshan etc. The details are available on the website of the institute.

== Memberships ==
The institute has an institutional membership with British Council, India and associate membership with the Indus Foundation, USA.

== Recent development ==
From 2011, a new batch of MA in Mass Communication and Community Journalism has been started in the institute. The course is actually of 2010 but due to delays in getting the Kalyani University clearance, the launching of the course had to be postponed.

== See also ==
- List of institutions of higher education in West Bengal
- Education in India
- Education in West Bengal
- Jadavpur University
- Kalyani University
- Netaji Subhas Open University
- University Grants Commission
- Viswa Bharati University
