= Jalangi Assembly constituency =

Jalangi
- Constituency No. 76 for the West Bengal Legislative Assembly
- Interactive Map Outlining Jalangi Assembly Constituency

Constituency details
- Country: India
- Region: East India
- State: West Bengal
- District: Murshidabad
- Lok Sabha constituency: Murshidabad
- Established: 1951
- Total electors: 261,258
- Reservation: None

Member of Legislative Assembly
- 18th West Bengal Legislative Assembly
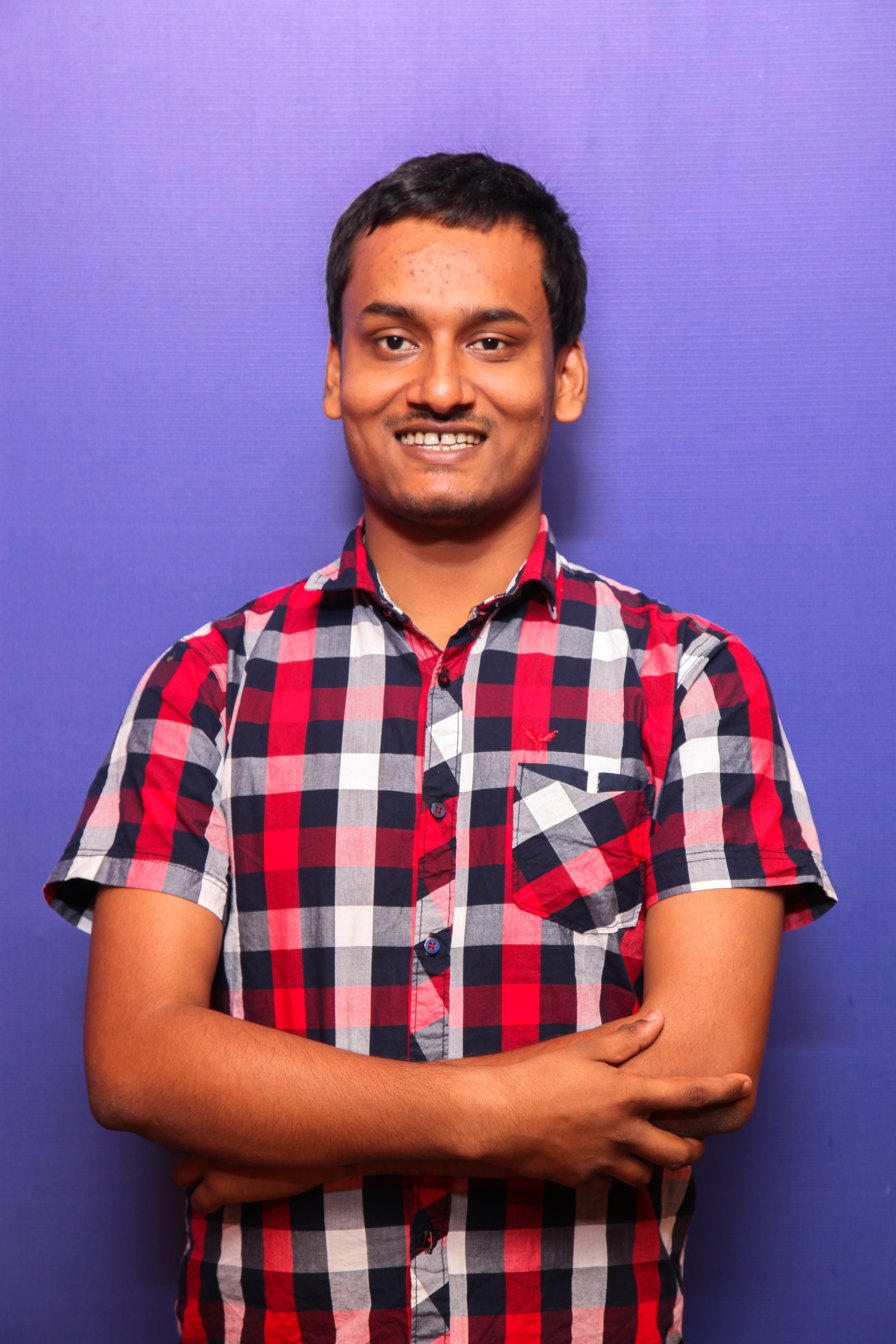
- Incumbent Babar Ali
- Party: Mamata All India Trinamool Congress
- Elected year: 2026

Jalangi Assembly constituency is an assembly constituency in Murshidabad district in the Indian state of West Bengal.

== Overview ==
As per orders of the Delimitation Commission, No. 76 Jalangi Assembly constituency covers Jalangi community development block, and Katlamari I, Katlamari II, Rajapur and Raninagar II gram panchayats of Raninagar II community development block.

Jalangi Assembly constituency is part of No. 11 Murshidabad (Lok Sabha constituency).

== Members of the Legislative Assembly ==
Election Year	Member	Party
Jalangi
1951	A.M.A. Zaman	Indian National Congress
1957	Golam Soleman	Indian National Congress
1962	Abdul Bari Moktar	Independent
1967	Azizur Rahman	Indian National Congress
1969	Azizur Rahman	Indian National Congress
1971	Prafulla Kumar Sarkar	Bharatiya Jana Sangh
1972	Prafulla Kumar Sarkar	Bharatiya Jana Sangh
1977	Atahar Rahman	Communist Party of India (Marxist)
1982	Atahar Rahman	Communist Party of India (Marxist)
1987	Atahar Rahman	Communist Party of India (Marxist)
1991	Yunus Ali Sarkar	Communist Party of India (Marxist)
1996	Yunus Ali Sarkar	Communist Party of India (Marxist)
2001	Yunus Ali Sarkar	Communist Party of India (Marxist)
2006	Yunus Ali Sarkar	Communist Party of India (Marxist)
2011	Abdur Razzak	Communist Party of India (Marxist)
2016	Abdur Razzak	Communist Party of India (Marxist)
2021	Abdur Razzak	Trinamool Congress
2026	Babar Ali	Trinamool Congress

== Election results ==
=== 2026 ===
2026 West Bengal Legislative Assembly election: Jalangi
Party	Candidate	Votes	%	±%
AITC	Babar Ali	88,684	35.01	▼20.73
CPI(M)	Yunus Ali Sarkar	67,168	26.52	▲6.46
BJP	Naba Kumar Sarkar	51,693	20.41	▲0.71
INC	Abdur Razzak	36,430	14.38	
AJUP	Habibur Rahaman	4,753	1.88	
NOTA	None of the above	1,345	0.53	▼0.62
Majority		21,516	8.49	▼27.19
Turnout		253,306	96.29	▲11.25
AITC hold		Swing		

=== 2021 ===
In the 2021 election, Abdur Razzak of Trinamool Congress defeated his nearest rival Saiful Islam Molla of CPI(M).

West Bengal assembly elections,2021: Jalangi constituency
Party	Candidate	Votes	%	±%
AITC	Abdur Razzak	123,840	55.74	
CPI(M)	Saiful Islam Molla	44,564	20.06	
BJP	Chandan Mandal	43,773	19.7	
Independent	Rafika Sultana	4,189	1.89	
NOTA	None of the above	2,551	1.15	
Majority		79,276	35.68	
Turnout		222,167	85.04	
AITC gain from CPI(M)		Swing		

=== 2016 ===
In the 2016 election, Abdur Razzak of CPI(M) defeated his nearest rival Alok Das of Trinamool Congress.

West Bengal assembly elections, 2016: Jalangi constituency
Party	Candidate	Votes	%	±%
CPI(M)	Abdur Razzak	96,250	50.25	▲0.70
AITC	Alok Das	70,983	37.06	▲9.54
BJP	Chandan Mondal	14,050	7.34	▲2.80
NOTA	None of the above	2,445	1.28	▲1.28
Majority		25,267	13.19	▼8.84
Turnout		191,526	83.87	▼5.23
CPI(M) hold		Swing		

=== 2011 ===
In the 2011 election, Abdur Razzak of CPI(M) defeated his nearest rival Idris Ali of Trinamool Congress.

West Bengal assembly elections, 2011: Jalangi constituency
Party	Candidate	Votes	%	±%
CPI(M)	Abdur Razzak	85,144	49.55	−1.61
AITC	Idris Ali	47,283	27.52	−18.72#
Independent	Samsuzzoha Biswas	25,834	15.03	
BJP	Naba Kumar Sarkar	7,796	4.54	
MLKSC	Abdul Haque Mondal	1,639	0.95	
Independent	Hashim Biswas	1,616	0.94	
BSP	Manindranath Sarkar	1,119	0.65	
JD(U)	Sirajul Shah	889	0.52	
AMB	Jogesh Chandra Sarkar	514	0.30	
Majority		37,861	22.03	
Turnout		171,834	89.1	
CPI(M) hold		Swing	+17.11#	

Samsuzzoha Biswas, contesting as an independent candidate, was a rebel Congress candidate supported by the Baharampur MP, Adhir Chowdhury.

.# Swing calculated on Congress+Trinamool Congress vote percentages taken together in 2006

=== 2006 ===
In the 2006, 2001, 1996 and 1991 state assembly elections Yunus Ali Sarkar of CPI(M) won the Jalangi assembly seat defeating his nearest rivals Subrata Saha of Congress in 2006 and 2001, Samsuzzoha Biswas of Congress in 1996, and Ranjit Haldar of Congress in 1991. Contests in most years were multi cornered but only winners and runners are being mentioned. Atahar Rahman of CPI(M) defeated Abdul Bari Biswas of Congress in 1987, Azizur Rahman of ICS in 1982, and Ranjit Kumar Haldar, Independent in 1977.

=== 1972 ===
Prafulla Kumar Sarkar of Bharatiya Jana Sangh won in 1972 and 1971. Azizur Rahman of Congress won in 1969 and 1967. Abdul Bari Moktar, Independent, won in 1962. Golam Soleman of Congress won in 1957. In independent India's first election in 1951, A.M.A.Zaman of Congress won the Jalangi seat.
