= Samarendranath Ghosh =

Indian politician in West Bengal

Member of the West Bengal Legislative Assembly
- Incumbent
- Assumed office 4 May 2026
- Preceded by: Bimalendu Sinha Roy
- Constituency: Karimpur

Personal details
- Party: Bharatiya Janata Party
- Profession: Politician

Samarendranath Ghosh is an Indian politician from West Bengal.He is currently serving as the Member of West Bengal Legislative Assembly from Karimpur since 4 May 2026.He is a member of Bhartiya Janata Party.

== Career ==
Ghosh hails from Kechuadanga village, Nadia district. His father's name is Late Santosh Ghosh. He passed from Krishnath College of Baharampur and served as a school teacher. He was a member of West Bengal Legislative Assembly since 2011-16 elected from Karimpur Assembly constituency under the banner of Communist Party of India (Marxist). In 2026 West Bengal Legislative Assembly election Ghosh was re-elected from Karimpur Assembly constituency as a member of Bharatiya Janata Party.
