= Abdur Razzak (Murshidabad politician) =

Indian politician

Member of the West Bengal Legislative Assembly
- In office 13 May 2011 – 5 May 2026
- Preceded by: Yunus Ali Sarkar
- Succeeded by: Babar Ali
- Constituency: Jalangi

Personal details
- Party: Trinamool Congress

Abdur Razzak (born 1958) is an Indian politician from West Bengal. He is a member of the West Bengal Legislative Assembly from Jalangi Assembly constituency in Murshidabad district. He won the 2021 West Bengal Legislative Assembly election representing the All India Trinamool Congress. He quits TMC after not getting ticket for WBLA in 2026.

== Early life and education ==
Razzak is from Jalangi, Murshidabad district, West Bengal. He is the son of late Kaifatulla Mandal. He completed his BEd in 1993 and later did his MA in 1994 at University of Calcutta.

== Career ==
Razzak won from Jalangi Assembly constituency representing All India Trinamool Congress in the 2021 West Bengal Legislative Assembly election. He polled 123,840 votes and defeated his nearest rival, Saiful Islam Molla of Communist Party of India (Marxist), by a margin of 79,276 votes. He first became an MLA winning the 2011 West Bengal Legislative Assembly election representing Communist Party of India (Marxist) from Jalangi. He retained it for the second term winning the 2016 West Bengal Legislative Assembly election also on Communist Party of India (Marxist) ticket. Later, he shifted to Trinamool Congress and won the third term in 2021 Assembly election.
