= Shaoni Singha Roy =

Indian politician (born 1973)

Member of West Bengal Legislative Assembly
- In office 2011–2021
- Preceded by: Bivas Chakraborty
- Succeeded by: Gouri Shankar Ghosh
- Constituency: Murshidabad

Personal details
- Born: 1973 (age 52–53) West Bengal
- Party: Trinamool Congress (2021–present); Indian National Congress (until 2021)
- Occupation: Politician

Shaoni Singha Roy (born 1973) is an Indian politician from West Bengal. She is a former two time member of the West Bengal Legislative Assembly from Murshidabad Assembly constituency in Murshidabad district. She won in 2011 and retained the seat in the 2016 West Bengal Legislative Assembly election representing the Indian National Congress.

== Early life and education ==
Roy is from Murshidabad, West Bengal. She married Debashish Singha Roy, a doctor. She completed her BSc in 1993 at Gurudas College which is affiliated with Calcutta University.

== Career ==
Roy won from Murshidabad Assembly constituency representing the Indian National Congress in the 2016 West Bengal Legislative Assembly election. She polled 94,579 votes and defeated her nearest rival, Ashim Krishna Bhatta of the Trinamool Congress, by a margin of 25,139 votes. She first became an MLA winning the 2011 West Bengal Legislative Assembly election, also on a Congress ticket. In 2011, she polled 75,441 votes and defeated her nearest rival, Bibhas Chakraborty of All India Forward Bloc, by a margin of 6,352 votes. She shifted to Trinamool Congress before the 2021 election and contested on a Trinamool ticket but lost the 2021 West Bengal Legislative Assembly election to Gouri Shankar Ghosh of the Bharatiya Janata Party, by a margin of 2491 votes.
