= University of Kalyani =

Public university in Kalyani, West Bengal, India

- কল্যাণী বিশ্ববিদ্যালয়
- Other name: Kalyani University
- Type: Public research university
- Established: 1960; 66 years ago
- Accreditation: NAAC
- Academic affiliations: UGC; AIU; AICTE
- Budget: ₹113.65 crore (US$12 million) (FY2025–26 est.)
- Chancellor: Governor of West Bengal
- Vice-Chancellor: Kallol Paul
- Academic staff: 226 (2023)
- Students: 6,113 (2023)
- Undergraduates: 744 (2023)
- Postgraduates: 4,654 (2023)
- Doctoral students: 713 (2023)
- Location: Kalyani, West Bengal, India; 22°59′11″N 88°26′44″E
- Campus: Urban 400 acres (160 ha)
- Acronym: KU
- Colours: Shocking Pink; Black
- Website: www.klyuniv.ac.in

The University of Kalyani, established in 1960, is a collegiate public research university located in Kalyani, West Bengal, India. It is administered by the Government of West Bengal, affiliated with the University Grants Commission (UGC), and accredited by the National Assessment and Accreditation Council (NAAC) with an "A" grade. The university offers academic programs at the undergraduate, postgraduate, and doctoral levels.

== History ==
The university was established on 1 November 1960 by 'The Kalyani University Act 1960' of the Government of West Bengal. The University of Kalyani is a State University and its activities are guided by 'The Kalyani University Act, 1981 (amended up to 2001)', enacted by the Government of West Bengal. The Act is supplemented by 'Statutes', 'Ordinances', 'Regulations' and 'Rules'. This act replaced 'The Kalyani University (Temporary Suppression) Act, 1978', which in turn replaced 'The Kalyani University Act, 1960'. The University Grants Commission accorded recognition to the university.

== Campus ==
The university is placed in an Urban areas setting touching the boundaries of some green Rural areas. The eastern bank of the Ganges is only 2000 meters from the University and its serene background is only 50 km from Kolkata. It is close to Kalyani Ghoshpara railway station, 10 minutes walking distance to Administration Building from the station, and the other campuses are around it. During the Second World War this land was under the control of the American army who maintained an Army depot here. Few roadways and other constructions are still there to prove that past history. The Campus spans over a huge area of 400 acres (largest State University of West Bengal based on area).

== Organisation and administration ==
=== Governance ===
The Vice-chancellor is the chief executive officer and the principal academic and administrative head of the university. The Vice-chancellor is appointed by the Governor of West Bengal in the capacity of Chancellor, in accordance with the provisions of The Kalyani University Act.

As of 17 December 2024, Kallol Paul is the Vice-chancellor of the university.

List of Vice-Chancellors
No.	Name	Tenure
1	Sachindranath Das Gupta	01.11.1960 – 31.10.1968
2	Sushil Kumar Mukherjee	02.11.1968 – 14.10.1970
3	Karunnaketan Sen	14.11.1970 – 05.09.1974
4	Debkumar Choudhuri	06.09.1974 – 19.12.1974
5	Pratul Chandra Mukherjee	01.03.1975 – 30.06.1976
6	Tara Bhusan Mukherjee	01.07.1976 – 07.11.1978
7	Subimal Kumar Mukherjee	08.11.1978 – 02.11.1979
8	Sitangsu Mookerjee	05.06.1980 – 18.06.1986
9	Santosh Kumar Sarkar	19.06.1986 – 28.02.1988
10	Kalyan Kumar Dasgupta	01.03.1988 – 17.08.1992
11	Ashis Kumar Roy	18.08.1992 – 31.07.1995
12	Basudeb Barman	01.08.1995 – 31.01.2000
13	Nityananda Saha	01.02.2000 – 10.03.2005
14	Arabinda Kumar Das	01.09.2005 – 22.10.2009
15	Alok Kumar Banerjee	23.10.2009 – 08.02.2013
16	Dilip Kumar Mohanta	09.02.2013 – 07.11.2013
17	Rattan Lal Hangloo	08.11.2013 – 22.12.2015
18	Malayendu Saha	23.12.2015 – 19.12.2016
19	Sankar Kumar Ghosh	20.12.2016 – 19.12.2020
20	Manas Kumar Sanyal	20.12.2020 – 30.05.2023
21	Amalendu Bhunia (Authorised)	31.05.2023 – 16.12.2024
22	Kallol Paul	17.12.2024 – present

=== Faculties and Departments ===
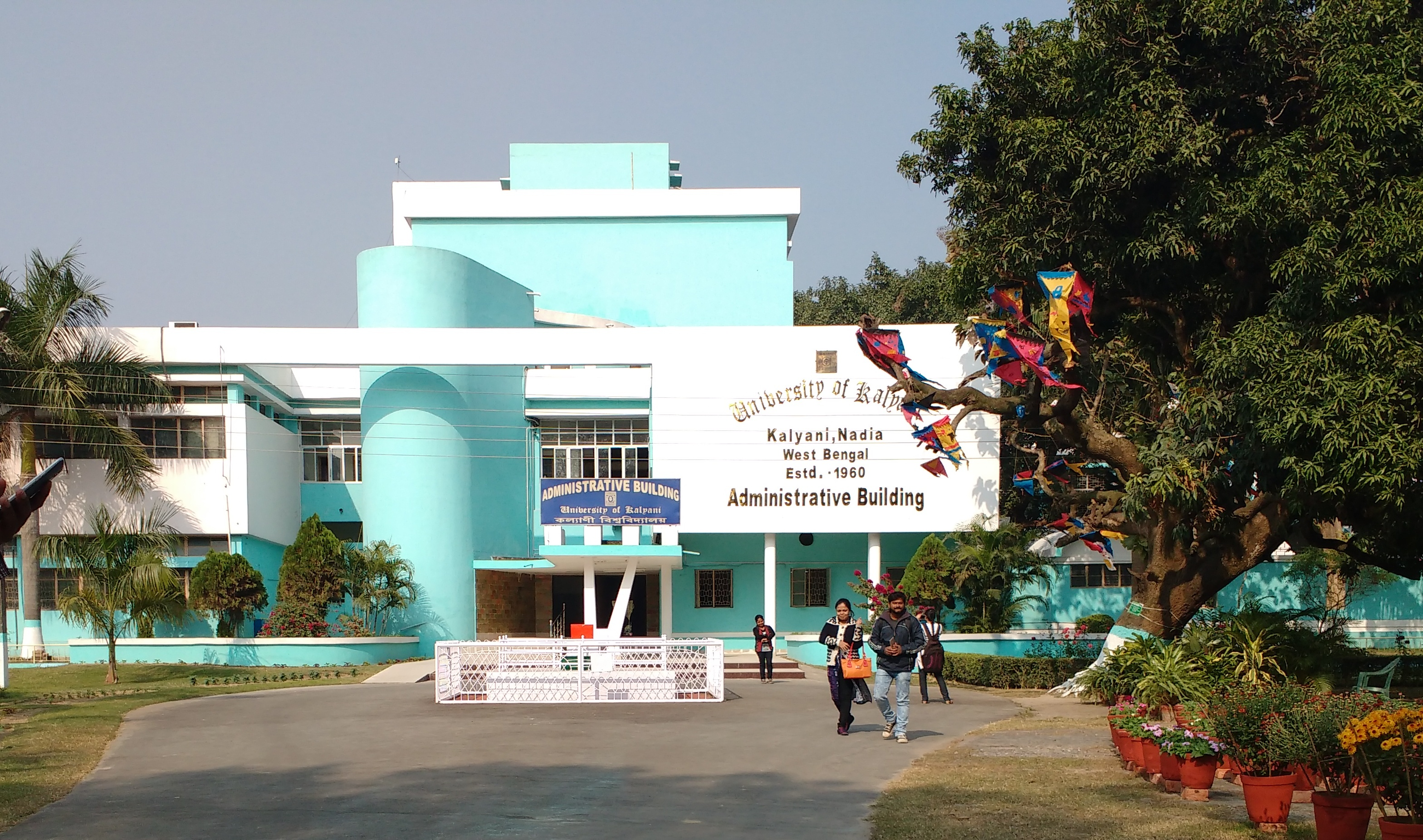
Administrative Building, University of Kalyani

The University of Kalyani has 37 departments organized into 6 faculty councils.

Faculty	Department
Faculty of Science	Mathematics
Faculty of Science	Physics
Faculty of Science	Chemistry
Faculty of Science	Botany
Faculty of Science	Biochemistry & Biophysics
Faculty of Science	Ecological Studies
Faculty of Science	Geography
Faculty of Science	Microbiology
Faculty of Science	Molecular Biology & Biotechnology
Faculty of Science	Environmental Science
Faculty of Science	Statistics
Faculty of Science	Zoology
Faculty of Science	Physiology
Faculty of Science	Food and Nutrition
Faculty of Engineering, Technology & Management	Computer Science and Engineering
Faculty of Engineering, Technology & Management	Engineering and Technological Studies: Information Technology; Electronics and Communication Engineering; Electronics and Instrumentation Engineering
Faculty of Engineering, Technology & Management	Business administration
Faculty of Arts & Commerce	Bengali
Faculty of Arts & Commerce	English
Faculty of Arts & Commerce	Hindi
Faculty of Arts & Commerce	Modern language
Faculty of Arts & Commerce	Sanskrit
Faculty of Arts & Commerce	Economics
Faculty of Arts & Commerce	History
Faculty of Arts & Commerce	Political science
Faculty of Arts & Commerce	Philosophy
Faculty of Arts & Commerce	Rural Developmental Studies
Faculty of Arts & Commerce	Library & Information science
Faculty of Arts & Commerce	Folklore
Faculty of Arts & Commerce	Sociology
Faculty of Arts & Commerce	Commerce
Faculty of Arts & Commerce	Visual arts
School of Interdisciplinary Studies	Nanoscience and Nanotechnology
School of Interdisciplinary Studies	Data science
School of Interdisciplinary Studies	Genomic Science
Faculty of Education	Lifelong Learning & Extension
Faculty of Education	Physical education
Faculty of Education	Education

=== Centers ===
Research centers
- Bioinformatics Infrastructure Facility Center
- Center for Information Resource Management (CIRM)
- ENVIS Center on Environmental Biotechnology
- Centre for Bengali Diaspora
- Centre for Women Studies
- Centre for Cultural Studies
- S N Bose Innovation Centre

== Affiliated Colleges ==
This university is providing academic guidance and leadership to 57 affiliated colleges and 7 others recognized institutes (as of 1 January 2020). Colleges are independent from the university but they follow the Course Curriculum of the university. Colleges are headed by the Principal and Professors, Teachers of the colleges are appointed via West Bengal College Service Commission (WBCSC). Colleges have responsibility for admitting Undergraduates and organising their classes. Here are names of total 64 affiliated colleges/other recognized institutes :

=== Govt./Govt.-Aided General Degree Colleges ===
1. Asannagar Madan Mohan Tarkalankar College
2. Berhampore College
3. Berhampore Girls' College
4. Bethuadahari College
5. Chakdaha College
6. Chapra Bangaljhi Mahavidyalaya
7. Domkal Girls' College
8. Dr. B.R. Ambedkar College
9. Dukhulal Nibaran Chandra College
10. Dumkal College
11. Dwijendralal College
12. Haringhata Mahavidyalaya
13. Hazi A.K. Khan College
14. Jalangi Mahavidyalaya
15. Jangipur College
16. Jatindra Rajendra Mahavidyalaya
17. Kalyani Mahavidyalaya
18. Kanchrapara College
19. Kandi Raj College
20. Karimpur Pannadevi College
21. Krishnagar Government College
22. Krishnagar Women's College
23. Lalgola College
24. Murshidabad Adarsha Mahavidyalaya
25. Muzaffar Ahmed Mahavidyalaya
26. Nabadwip Vidyasagar College
27. Nabagram Amar Chand Kundu College
28. Nagar College
29. Nur Mohammad Smriti Mahavidyalaya
30. Panchthupi Haripada Gouribala College
31. Plassey College
32. Pritilata Waddedar Mahavidyalaya
33. Prof. Sayed Nurul Hasan College
34. Raja Birendra Chandra College
35. Ranaghat College
36. Rani Dhanya Kumari College
37. Sagardighi Kamada Kinkar Smriti Mahavidyalaya
38. Santipur College
39. Srikrishna College
40. Sripat Singh College
41. Sewnarayan Rameswar Fatepuria College
42. Subhas Chandra Bose Centenary College
43. Sudhiranjan Lahiri Mahavidyalaya
44. Tehatta Government College
45. Muragacha Government College
46. Government General Degree College, Kaliganj
47. Government General Degree College, Chapra

=== Self-financed General Degree Colleges ===
1. Institute of Mass Communication Film & Television Studies
2. G.D. College, Shaikpara

=== Govt.-aided B.P.Ed. College ===
1. Union Christian Training College

=== Self-financed B. P. Ed. Colleges ===
1. Prabharani Institute of Education
2. Sunil Dhar Memorial B.P.Ed. College

=== Self-financed Law Colleges ===
1. Bimal Chandra College of Law
2. J.R.S.E.T. College of Law
3. Mohammad Abdul Bari Institute of Juridical Science
4. S. K. Acharya Institute of Juridical Science

=== Other Recognized Institutes ===
1. Central Sericultural Research and Training Institute
2. G.D. Paramedical College
3. Kalyani Technology Academy
4. Tagore School of Rural Development and Agricultural Management
5. Dr. K.R. Adhikary College of Optometry & Paramedical Technology
6. Monarch College of Art and Technology
7. Susrijo Institute of Paramedical Technology and Optometry
8. Susrijo Institute of Agricultural Science, Technology and Management

== Academics ==
=== Accreditation ===
In 2015, University of Kalyani has been awarded A grade (CGPA 3.12) by the NAAC.

=== Achievements ===
Hepatitis C nosode was developed by Rajesh Shah with a group of Molecular Biologists at the University of Kalyani, where it was demonstrated that the nosode sourced from Hepatitis C virus could produce anti-Cancer effect on cell lines in a laboratory model. This was one big achievement by the Biologists in the field.

=== Rankings ===
University rankings

General – international
- QS (Asia) (2024): 801+

General – India
- NIRF (Overall) (2024): 151-200
- NIRF (Universities) (2024): 151-200

University of Kalyani has ranked 801+ in the QS Asia Ranking 2024. The university has ranked 151-200 band among universities in India by the National Institutional Ranking Framework (NIRF) in 2024 and in the 151-200 band overall.

== Notable students ==
- Koushik Kar, Indian actor
- Alokesh Das, Indian politician
- Bimalendu Sinha Roy, Indian politician
- Braja Kishore Goswami, Indian politician
- Jagannath Sarkar, Indian politician
- Nimai Chandra Saha, vice-chancellor of the University of Burdwan
- Suman Kumar Dhar, Indian molecular biologist
- Babar Ali, academic
- Humayun Kabir, Indian politician
- Ramendra Nath Biswas, Indian politician
- Swadhin Kumar Mandal, Indian chemist and professor
- Mihir Kanti Chaudhuri, Indian chemist
- Susmita Bose, Indian-American biomaterials scientist and professor
- Syed Mustafa Siraj, writer

== See also ==
- List of institutions of higher education in West Bengal
- Education in India
- Education in West Bengal
