= Swadhin Kumar Mandal =

Indian chemist

- Born: West Bengal, India
- Education: University of Kalyani; Indian Institute of Science; University of California, Riverside; University of Göttingen
- Known for: Studies on catalysis and drug development
- Awards: 2020 Bessel Prize, Alexander von Humboldt Foundation, Germany 2018 Shanti Swarup Bhatnagar Prize
- Scientific career
- Fields: Organometallic chemistry
- Workplaces: Carbon Solutions, Inc. California; Indian Institute of Science Education and Research, Kolkata
- Doctoral advisor: S. S. Krishnamurthy; Robert C. Haddon; Herbert W. Roesky

Swadhin Kumar Mandal (Bengali: স্বাধীন কুমার মন্ডল) is a Bengali Indian organometallic chemist and a professor at the department of chemical sciences of the Indian Institute of Science Education and Research, Kolkata. Mandal, an Alexander von Humboldt Fellow, is known for his studies in the fields of catalysis, new drug development and material chemistry. The Council of Scientific and Industrial Research, the apex agency of the Government of India for scientific research, awarded him the Shanti Swarup Bhatnagar Prize for Science and Technology, one of the highest Indian science awards, for his contributions to chemical sciences in 2018. (Note: Long link - please select award year to see details). In 2020, he was awarded the Friedrich Wilhelm Bessel Research Award (https://www.humboldt-foundation.de/en/apply/sponsorship-programmes/friedrich-wilhelm-bessel-research-award)by Alexander von Humboldt (AvH) Foundation, Germany in recognition of his outstanding research accomplishments. In 2022, he was awarded the Erna and Jakob Michael visiting professorship at the Weizmann Institute of Science, Israel. In 2021, he was elected as a fellow of the Indian Academy of Sciences (FASc) and in 2024, he was elected as a fellow of the Indian National Science Academy (FNA).

== Biography ==
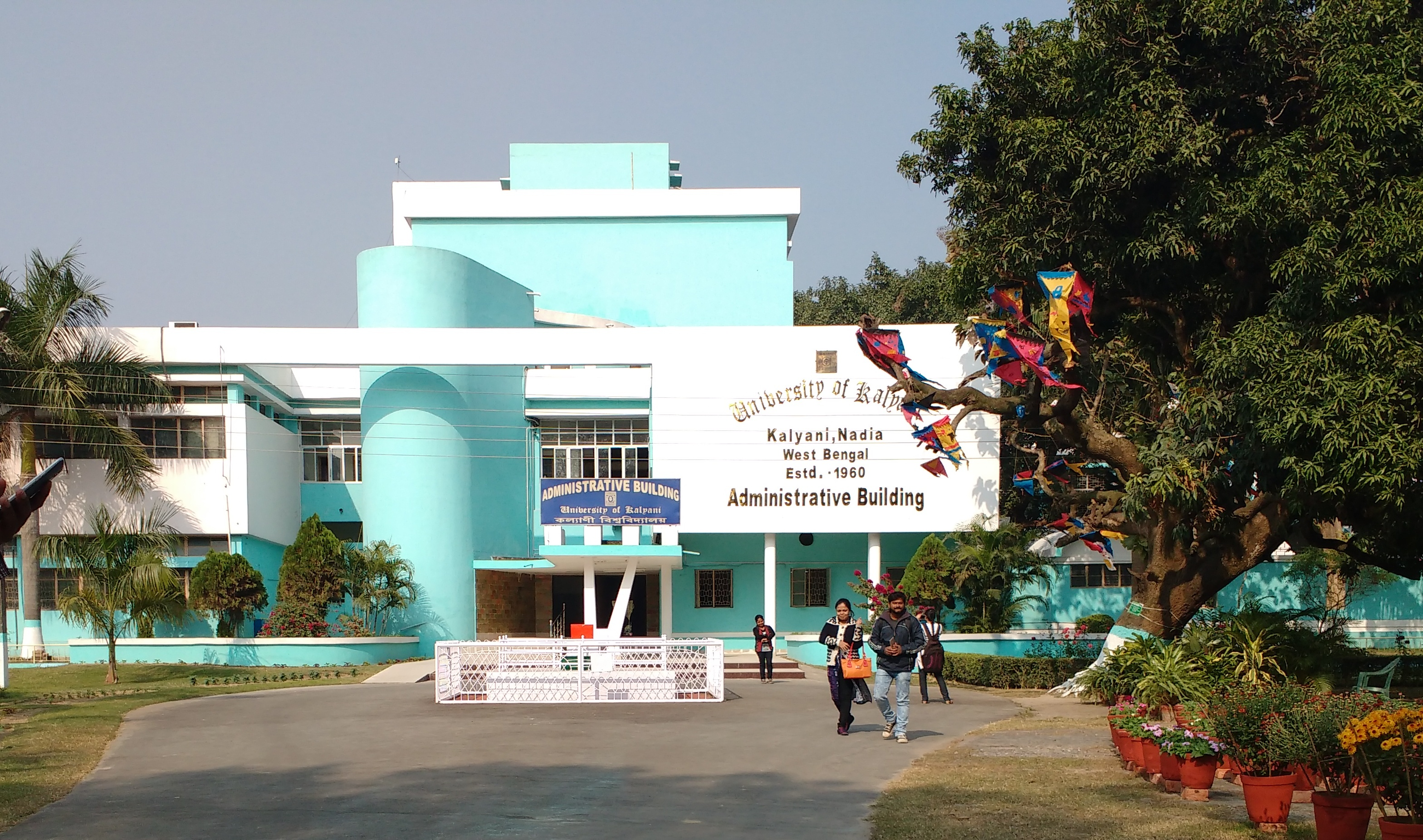
Kalyani University

Swadhin Kumar Mandal, born on 15 August 1973 in the Indian state of West Bengal, graduated with honors in chemistry from the University of Kalyani in 1993 and followed it up with a master's degree from the same university in 1996. Subsequently, he enrolled for doctoral studies at the Indian Institute of Science under the guidance of Setharampattu Seshaiyer Krishnamurthy and after securing a PhD in 2002, he moved to the US to do the post-doctoral studies, under Robert C. Haddon of the University of California at Riverside (2002–2006); later, he worked at the laboratory of Herbert W. Roesky of the University of Göttingen (2006–2007), holding an Alexander von Humboldt fellowship. During his stay in the US. he also worked at Carbon Solutions, Inc. California, and on his return to India, he joined the Indian Institute of Science Education and Research, Kolkata (IISER Kolkata) where he holds the position of a professor. At IISER, he heads a laboratory, Swadhin K. Mandal's Sensitive Lab where he hosts several doctoral and post-doctoral researchers.

Mandal focuses his research on designing dual catalyst for hydroamination and has published a number of articles. (Note: Please see Selected bibliography section) ResearchGate, an online repository of scientific articles has listed 85 of them. The Council of Scientific and Industrial Research awarded him the Shanti Swarup Bhatnagar Prize, one of the highest Indian science awards in 2018.

== Selected bibliography ==
- Mandal, Swadhin K.; Datta, Ayan; Govindarajan, R.; Vijaykumar, Gonela; Vardhanapu, Pavan K.; Hota, Pradip Kumar; Bhattacharjee, Rameswar; Sau, Samaresh Chandra (30 November 2018). "Transforming atmospheric CO2 into alternative fuels: a metal-free approach under ambient conditions". Chemical Science. 10 (6): 1879–1884. doi:10.1039/C8SC03581D. ISSN 2041-6539. PMC 6371756. PMID 30842857.
- P, Sreejyothi; Sau, Samaresh Chandra; Vardhanapu, Pavan K.; Mandal, Swadhin K. (17 August 2018). "Halo-Bridged Abnormal NHC Palladium(II) Dimer for Catalytic Dehydrogenative Cross-Coupling Reactions of Heteroarenes". The Journal of Organic Chemistry. 83 (16): 9403–9411. doi:10.1021/acs.joc.8b01053. ISSN 0022-3263. PMID 30015486. S2CID 51637722.
- Bhunia, Mrinal; Vijaykumar, Gonela; Adhikari, Debashis; Mandal, Swadhin K. (4 December 2017). "Highly Active Carbene Potassium Complexes for the Ring-Opening Polymerization of ε-Caprolactone". Inorganic Chemistry. 56 (23): 14459–14466. doi:10.1021/acs.inorgchem.7b01892. ISSN 0020-1669. PMID 29144126.
- Sau, Samaresh Chandra; Bhattacharjee, Rameswar; Vardhanapu, Pavan K.; Vijaykumar, Gonela; Datta, Ayan; Mandal, Swadhin K. (2016). "Metal-Free Reduction of CO2 to Methoxyborane under Ambient Conditions through Borondiformate Formation". Angewandte Chemie International Edition. 55 (48): 15147–15151. doi:10.1002/anie.201609040. ISSN 1521-3773. PMID 27860175.
- Pariyar, Anand; Vijaykumar, Gonela; Bhunia, Mrinal; Dey, Suman Kr.; Singh, Santosh K.; Kurungot, Sreekumar; Mandal, Swadhin K. (13 May 2015). "Switching Closed-Shell to Open-Shell Phenalenyl: Toward Designing Electroactive Materials". Journal of the American Chemical Society. 137 (18): 5955–5960. Bibcode:2015JAChS.137.5955P. doi:10.1021/jacs.5b00272. ISSN 0002-7863. PMID 25933051.

== See also ==
- Drug development
- Catalysis
