= A. M. A. Zaman =

Indian politician

Janab A.M.A. Zaman was an Indian politician and trade unionist. As of 1936 he served as councillor in the Calcutta Municipal Corporation. He won the Hooghly labour seat in the 1936–1937 Bengal Legislative Assembly election. At the time he belonged to the Congress Socialist Party, but he was known for shifting party affiliations frequently.

A.M.A. Zaman was involved in different trade unions. He was a leader of Jute mill workers during the struggle for independence. Whereas many other leaders hailed from the bhadralok, upper classes, A.M.A. Zaman hailed from a working-class background and had been a jute mill worker himself. In the midst of the 1936–1937 labour unrest he founded a jute mill workers union, which was registered in 1936. In July 1937 A.M.A. Zaman was convicted of rioting at a strike in the Wellington Jute Mills in Rishra, but thousands of Hooghly workers turned to the streets to demand his release. A.M.A. Zaman was one of the key speakers of the mass labour rally in Calcutta of 29 July 1937. In December 1937 he was elected general secretary of the Bengal Provincial Trade Union Congress. However, his influence in Hooghly decreased as sardars and babus disseminated a rumour that he had taken a bribe from mill management.

A.M.A. Zaman left the CSP in 1939, after which the party ceased to be influential in Hooghly District. He belonged to the grouping that opposed Indrajit Gupta's influence in the BPTUC.

A.M.A. Zaman was re-elected from the Hooghly-cum-Serampore Registered Factories, Labour seat in the Bengal Legislative Assembly in the 1946 election. He belonged to the Indian National Congress during this period.

After Independence, A.M.A. Zaman won the Jalangi constituency seat of the West Bengal Legislative Assembly in the 1951 election as an Indian National Congress candidate. As of 1956 he served as Parliamentary Secretary for the Labour Department.

He was the founding president of the Shiva Glass Employees Union during his tenure as legislator.
