= Berhampore Girls' College =

College in West Bengal, India

- Type: Undergraduate college
- Established: 1946; 80 years ago
- Affiliations: University of Kalyani
- Principal: Dr. Hena Sinha
- Location: Berhampore, West Bengal, 742101, India; 24°05′28.10″N 88°15′05.83″E
- Campus: Urban
- Website: berhamporegirlscollege.ac.in
- Location within West Bengal Location within India

Berhampore Girls' College is a women's college in Berhampore, in Murshidabad district, in the state of West Bengal in India. It is affiliated to the University of Kalyani.

== Departments ==
Faculties and Departments
Faculty	Departments
Science	Chemistry, Physics, Mathematics, Botany, Zoology, Physiology, Computer Science, Environmental Science, Geography
Arts	Bengali, English, Sanskrit, History, Political Science, Philosophy, Economics, Sociology, Physical Education

== Accreditation ==
The college is recognized by the University Grants Commission (UGC). It was accredited by the National Assessment and Accreditation Council (NAAC), and awarded B grade, an accreditation that has since then expired. In 2025, it was awarded A grade accredition from the NAAC, after the college scored 3.2 in their assessment.

== See also ==
{{columns-list|colwidth=22em|

- List of institutions of higher education in West Bengal
- Education in India
- Education in West Bengal
- Berhampore College
