= Mihir Kanti Chaudhuri =

Indian inorganic chemist (1947–2024)

- Born: 21 July 1947; Assam Province, British India
- Died: 13 December 2024 (aged 77)
- Education: Kalyani University; IIT Kharagpur; Ruhr University Bochum
- Known for: Studies on dioxygen complexes and fluorine compounds
- Awards: 1989 Shanti Swarup Bhatnagar Prize; 1998 P. Natrajan Endowment Award; 2002 Chemito Award; 2005 ICS S. S. Sandhu Award
- Scientific career
- Fields: Inorganic chemistry
- Workplaces: North Eastern Hill University; Tezpur University; IIT Guwahati

Mihir Kanti Chaudhuri (21 July 1947 – 13 December 2024) was an Indian inorganic chemist and a vice-chancellor of Tezpur University. He is known for his studies on the synthesis of dioxygen complexes and fluorine compounds of metals and non metals and was an elected fellow of the Indian National Science Academy, and the Indian Academy of Sciences. The Council of Scientific and Industrial Research, the apex agency of the Government of India for scientific research, awarded him the Shanti Swarup Bhatnagar Prize for Science and Technology, one of the highest Indian science awards, in 1989, for his contributions to chemical sciences.

== Biography ==
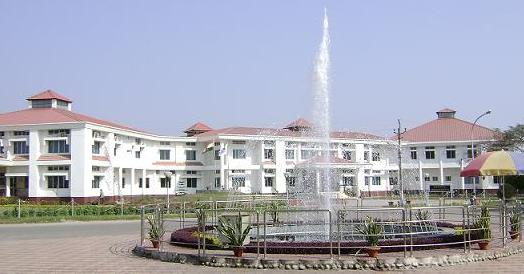
Tezpur University

M. K. Chaudhuri, born on 21 July 1947 in the northeast Indian state of Assam, obtained a master's degree from Kalyani University before securing his PhD from the Indian Institute of Technology, Kharagpur in 1973. Moving to Germany, he completed Dr rer. net. from Ruhr University Bochum in 1975 and returned to India to join the North Eastern Hill University as a professor at the department of chemistry. Later, he moved to the Indian Institute of Technology, Guwahati as the head of the chemistry department where he served as the dean of student affairs as well as the dean of research and development. In May 2007, he was appointed the vice chancellor of Tezpur University. On completion of his five-year term, he was reappointed the vice-chancellor in 2012 and held the position until May 2017.

Chaudhuri's researches have been focused on the synthesis of dioxygen complexes and fluorine compounds of metals and non-metals. He has published a number of articles in peer-reviewed journals (Note: Please see Selected bibliography section) and Indian Academy of Sciences have listed 88 of them in their online repository. Under his leadership, Tezpur University have developed into a major centre of learning in India and received the Visitor's Award for the Best University from the President of India in 2016. He has been associated with the Department of Science and Technology, Council of Scientific and Industrial Research and the University Grants Commission of India as well as the state and union government bodies as an expert committee member and has organized many refresher courses and seminars at the university and outside. He was also a member of the Indo-US Higher Education Dialogue of 2014 and the Inspire program on Mathematics of the Department of Science and Technology.

Chaudhuri died on 13 December 2024, at the age of 77.

== Awards and honors ==
The Indian Academy of Sciences elected him as their fellow in 1988 and the Council of Scientific and Industrial Research awarded him the Shanti Swarup Bhatnagar Prize, one of the highest Indian science awards, in 1989. He became an elected fellow of the Indian National Science Academy in 1991 and received P. Natrajan Endowment Award in 1998. He is also a recipient of the Chemito Award (2002) and S. S. Sandhu Award of Indian Chemical Society (2005). In 2017 he received honorary D.Sc degree from Kalyani University and University of Science and Technology, Meghalaya.

== Selected bibliography ==
- Chaudhuri, Mihir K.; Dehury, Sanjay K.; Dhar, Siddhartha S.; Sinha, Upasana B. (2004). "The economic synthesis of pyridinium fluorochromate(VI), C5H5NH[CrO3F] (PFC), and solvent-free oxidation of organic substrates with PFC". Synthetic Communications. 34 (22): 4077–4087. doi:10.1081/SCC-200036584. S2CID 98552998.
- Kantam, M. Lakshmi; Neeraja, V.; Kavita, B.; Neelima, B.; Chaudhuri, Mihir K.; Hussain, Sahid (2005). "Cu(acac)2 immobilized in ionic liquids: a recoverable and reusable catalytic system for aza-michael reactions". Advanced Synthesis & Catalysis. 347 (6): 763–766. doi:10.1002/adsc.200404361.
- Chaudhuri, M. K.; Dehury, S. K.; Hussain, S.; Duarah, A.; Gogoi, N. (2006). "The selective solid-phase oxidation of alcohols and other organic substrates by 3,5-dimethylpyrazolium fluorochromate". Organic Preparations and Procedures International. 38 (3): 331–336. doi:10.1080/00304940609355994. S2CID 96752977.
- Chaudhuri, Mihir K.; Hussain, Sahid; Bharadwaj, Saitanya K.; Kalita, Harjyoti (2007). "Borax as an efficient metal-free catalyst for hetero-michael reactions in an aqueous medium". European Journal of Organic Chemistry. 2007 (2): 374–378. doi:10.1002/ejoc.200600691.
- Bharadwaj, Saitanya K.; Hussain, Sahid; Kar, Manoranjan; Chaudhuri, Mihir K. (2008). "Acid phosphate-impregnated titania-catalyzed nitration of aromatic compounds with nitric acid". Applied Catalysis A: General. 343 (1–2): 62–67. Bibcode:2008AppCA.343...62B. doi:10.1016/j.apcata.2008.03.024.

== See also ==
- Dioxygen
