= Bimalendu Sinha Roy =

Indian politician

Member of the West Bengal Legislative Assembly
- Incumbent
- Assumed office 28 November 2019
- Preceded by: Mahua Moitra
- Constituency: Karimpur

Personal details
- Born: 1958 (age 67–68)
- Party: Trinamool Congress
- Education: Kalyani University
- Occupation: Teacher, Politician

Bimalendu Singha Roy is an Indian teacher and politician from West Bengal. Representing the Trinamool Congress, he won the 2021 West Bengal Legislative Assembly election from Karimpur Assembly constituency.

== Biography ==
Roy was born in 1958. He graduated from Krishnagar Government College in English. He completed postgraduate studies in English from Kalyani University in 1982.

Roy joined Muragachha High School in 1985. He became the headmaster of this institution in 2000. He retired from his job in 2016.

Roy received Shiksharatna from West Bengal Government in 2013. He received Rashtrapati Award in 2017.

Roy was elected as a member of the West Bengal Legislative Assembly from Karimpur on 28 November 2019.
