= Gouri Shankar Ghosh =

Indian politician (born 1972)

Cabinet Minister, Government of West Bengal
- Incumbent
- Assumed office 1 June 2026
- Governor: R. N. Ravi
- Chief Minister: Suvendu Adhikari
- Departments: Backward Classes Welfare *Mass Education Extension and Library Services

Member of the West Bengal Legislative Assembly
- Incumbent
- Assumed office 2 May 2021
- Preceded by: Shaoni Singha Roy
- Constituency: Murshidabad

Personal details
- Born: 10 September 1972 (age 54)
- Party: Bharatiya Janata Party
- Education: M.A. (Political Science)
- Alma mater: Rabindra Bharati University
- Profession: Businessman, Politician

Gouri Shankar Ghosh (born 10 September 1972) is an Indian politician from the Bharatiya Janata Party (BJP). He has served as a member of the West Bengal Legislative Assembly from the Murshidabad constituency since 2021. He was re-elected in the 2026 West Bengal Legislative Assembly election and was later inducted into the West Bengal Cabinet as a minister in the BJP-led state government.

== Political career ==
On 1 June 2026, he was sworn in as a Cabinet Minister of West Bengal, along with twelve other members.
