= Chhaya Ghosh =

Indian politician (1940–2010)

Chhaya Ghosh (15 August 1940 – 12 February 2010) was a minister in the Indian state of West Bengal and was a Forward Bloc leader.

== Political career ==
She was elected to the West Bengal state assembly from Murshidabad (Vidhan Sabha constituency) in 1977, 1982, 1991 and 2001. She was minister for relief from 1991 to 1996, and of the agricultural marketing department from 2001 to 2005.

== Later life ==
A former school teacher at MMC Girls School, she was brought into politics by Hemanta Bose. At the end of her life she broke with the Forward Block. For the 2006 state assembly elections, Forward Bloc denied her a ticket. She joined the Janabadi Forward Bloc.

She died of age-related problems on 12 February 2010. Her lawyer husband predeceased her. She left behind two daughters.
