= Niamot Sheikh =

Indian politician

- নিয়ামত শেখ

Member of the West Bengal Legislative Assembly
- Incumbent
- Assumed office 2016
- Leader: Mamata Banarjee
- Preceded by: Insar Ali Biswas
- Constituency: Hariharpara

Personal details
- Born: Gajdharpara, Berhampore
- Citizenship: Indian
- Party: All India Trinamool Congress (until 2026); Democratic Trinamool Congress (from 2026)
- Education: Gajdharpara Primary School (4 Pass)
- Occupation: Politician, businessman

Niamot Sheikh (Bengali: নিয়ামত শেখ) is an Indian Bengali businessman and politician from the state of West Bengal. He is a current member of the West Bengal Legislative Assembly from the Hariharpara (Vidhan Sabha constituency), Murshidabad.
