= Indian People's Forward Bloc =

- Secretary: Chhaya Ghosh
- Founder: Jayanta Roy
- Founded: 2006
- Split from: All India Forward Bloc
- Ideology: Liberalism; Democratic Socialism populism
- Political position: Left-wing
- Colours: Red
- ECI status: Dissolved
- Alliance: Congress+ (2006)

Indian People's Forward Bloc (IPFB) was a political party in West Bengal, India. The party emerged through a split in the All India Forward Bloc. The party was led by Jayanta Roy, former AIFB Rajya Sabha member, and Chhaya Ghosh, former West Bengal Minister of Agriculture. Ahead of the 2006 legislative election, IPFB reached an alliance with the Indian National Congress, although no IPFB candidate got elected.
