= Chowdhury Abu Taleb =

Indian politician

Chowdhury Abu Taleb (dead 1971) was an Indian politician. He was elected to the Fifth Lok Sabha from the Murshidabad seat in the 1971 Indian general election. An Indian Union Muslim League leader, he stood as an independent. He obtained 93,716 votes (34.38% of the votes in the constituency). He died in 1971, some two months after becoming a parliamentarian.
