= Babar Ali (teacher) =

Indian teacher, headmaster at 16

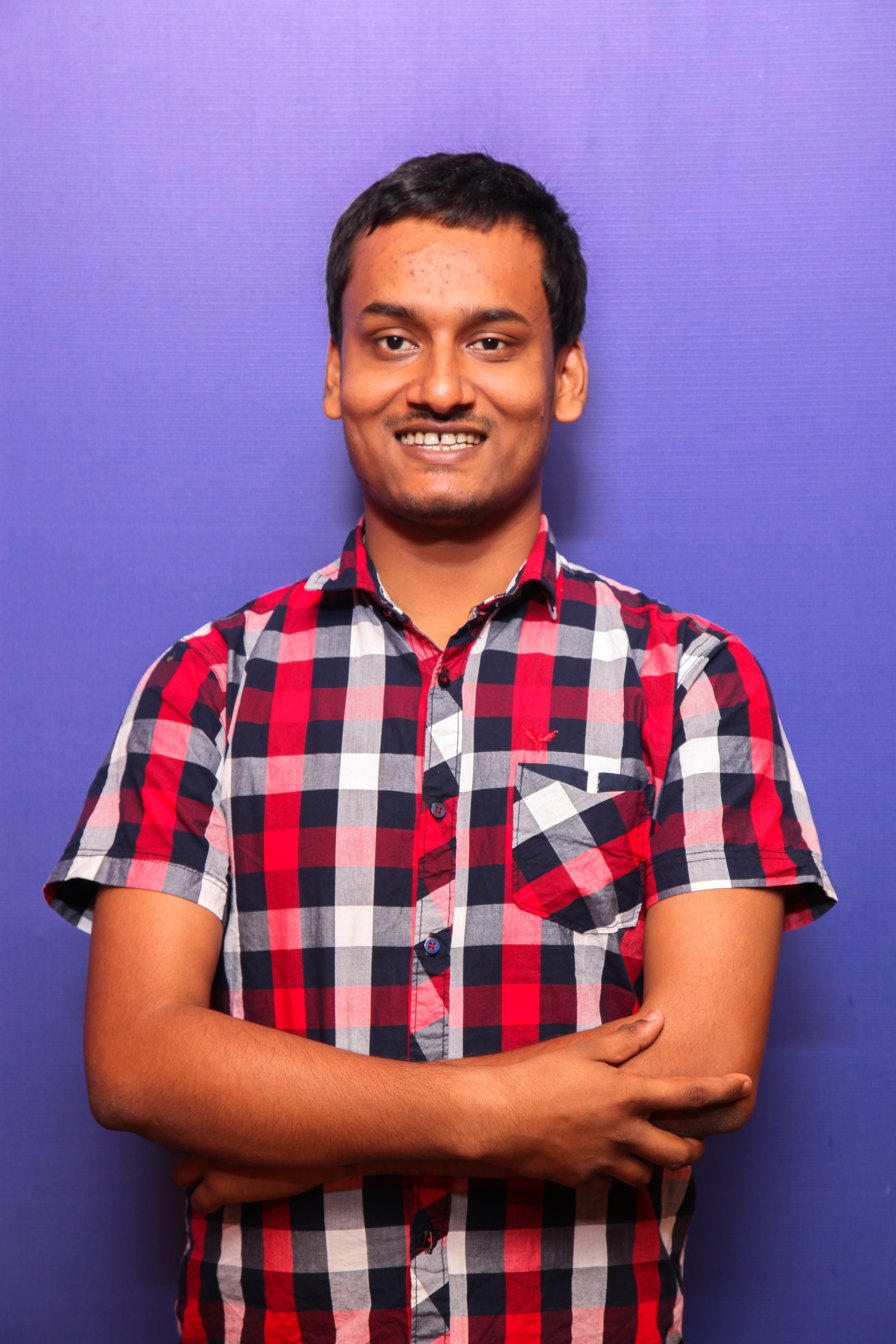
- Babar Ali in 2015

Member of the West Bengal Legislative Assembly
- Incumbent
- Assumed office 14 May 2026
- Preceded by: Abdur Razzak
- Constituency: Jalangi

Personal details
- Born: 18 March 1993 (age 33) Murshidabad, West Bengal, India
- Citizenship: Indian
- Party: Mamata All India Trinamool Congress (from 2026)
- Parent: Md Nasiruddin; Banuara Bibi
- Occupation: Educationist & Politician
- Awards: Real Heroes Award 2009 by CNN IBN
- Website: www.babarali.in

Babar Ali (born 18 March 1993) is a teacher and politician from Murshidabad in West Bengal. He was called the "youngest headmaster in the world" by BBC in October 2009, at the age of sixteen.

== Career ==
He had begun teaching at nine years of age, mostly as a game, and then decided to continue teaching other children at a larger scale.

That the school is tuition-free makes it affordable for the poor in this economically deprived area, so that the school has been recognised to have helped increase literacy rates in the area. In Murshidabad there had been no governmental or private schools. Pupils come from nearby villages and walk up to four kilometres in order to attend their lessons.

Babar Ali succeeded in having his school recognized by the local authorities when he realised that this would entitle its pupils to the portion of free rice given to pupils at the end of the month by the government.

== Political career ==
In 2026, Babar Ali joined the TMC and contested the West Bengal Legislative Assembly election from the Jalangi Assembly constituency.

He won the election with 88,684 votes, defeating four-time former MLA and CPI(M) candidate Ianus Ali Sarkar by a margin of 21,516 votes.

In June 2026, Babar Ali was also appointed as the State General Secretary of the All India Trinamool Congress (AITC).

== Honor and recognition ==
In 2009, Babar Ali won a prize from the program Real Heroes of the Indian English news channel CNN IBN for his work and was awarded the NDTV ‘Indian of the Year’ award and LITERACY HERO AWARD, BY ROTARY INDIA LITERACY MISSION and recently featured in ‘FORBES ASIA’ in their 30 under 30 list as a ‘SOCIAL ENTREPRENEUR’, also recognised as the Literacy hero by international literacy association in their "30 under 30" list, Also received Education leadership award by BBC knowledge, His story became a part of the syllabus for the PUC English textbook for Govt. of Karnataka, and also in curriculum across the globe. He was featured on Aamir Khan's TV show Satyamev Jayate in July 2012, and is regularly invited to speak at various conferences and forums all over the world. Babar is also a TED Fellow and an INK FELLOW AND INK Conference speaker and Wired fellow, Babar graduated from Berhampur Krishnath College (under Kalyani University in West Bengal, India) in English Honours, and Completed his M.A. in English & History.

== Legacy ==
The Karnataka government has included Babar's story in the prescribed 1st PUC English Text Book in its State Board i.e. KSEAB. His story is also in the main course book for Class 10 by NCERT in the CBSE. Former President of India Shri Ramnath Kovind mentioned Babar Ali and his work in his speech addressing the nation on 25 January 2020.
