= Syed Masudal Hossain =

Indian politician

Member of the Lok Sabha
- In office 1980–1998
- Constituency: Murshidabad

Personal details
- Born: 14 August 1939 (age 86) Murshidabad district, West Bengal
- Party: Communist Party of India (Marxist)
- Spouse: Nargis Sattar

Syed Masudal Hossain was an Indian politician and the member of the 11th Lok Sabha who represented Murshidabad parliamentary constituency of West Bengal State. He was born on 14 August 1939 in Beniagram area of Murshidabad district of West Bengal, and was associated with Communist Party of India (Marxist). Syed was also re-elected as the member of parliament during the 7th, 8th, 9th, 10th and 11th general elections (Lok Sabha) of the India.
